= 1930 International Lawn Tennis Challenge Europe Zone =

International tennis competition

The Europe Zone was one of the two regional zones of the 1930 International Lawn Tennis Challenge.

24 teams entered the Europe Zone, with the winner going on to compete in the Inter-Zonal Final against the winner of the America Zone. Italy defeated Japan in the final, and went on to face the United States in the Inter-Zonal Final.

== Draw ==
First Round; 19 April–6 May
Norway
bye
Austria
bye
Italy
bye
Egypt
bye
Great Britain	3
Germany	2
Poland	3
Romania	2
Switzerland	0
Australia	5
Ireland	4
Monaco	1
Greece	2
India	3
Hungary	0
Japan	4
Spain	4
Belgium	1
Yugoslavia	5
Sweden	0
bye
Czechoslovakia
bye
Denmark
bye
Netherlands
bye
Finland

Second Round; 9–20 May
Oslo, Norway (clay)
Norway	0
Austria	5
Rome, Italy (clay)
Italy	5
Egypt	0
Torquay, England (clay)
Great Britain	5
Poland	0
Dublin, Ireland (grass)
Australia	4
Ireland	1
London, England (clay)
India	0
Japan	5
Zagreb, Yugoslavia
Spain	5
Yugoslavia	0
Prague, Czechoslovakia
Czechoslovakia	3
Denmark	2
Amsterdam, Netherlands (clay)
Netherlands	4
Finland	1

Quarterfinals; 30 May–9 June
Vienna, Austria
Austria	2
Italy	3
Eastbourne, England (grass)
Great Britain	1
Australia	4
Barcelona, Spain (clay)
Japan	4
Spain	1
Scheveningen, Netherlands (clay)
Czechoslovakia	3
Netherlands	2

Semifinals; 14–16 June
Milan, Italy (clay)
Italy	3
Australia	2
Prague, Czechoslovakia
Japan	3
Czechoslovakia	2

Final; 11–13 July
Genoa, Italy (clay)
Italy	3
Japan	2

== First round ==
=== Great Britain vs. Germany ===
Great Britain
3
Queen's Club, London, England
24–26 April 1930
Clay

Germany
2

			1	2	3	4	5
1	(United Kingdom) (Germany)	Bunny Austin; Heinz Landmann	3; 6	6; 8	7; 5	6; 4	4; 6
2	(United Kingdom) (Germany)	Harry Lee; Daniel Prenn	4; 6	9; 7	3; 6	2; 6
3	(United Kingdom) (Germany)	Ian Collins / Colin Gregory; Walter Dessart / Heinrich Kleinschroth	6; 2	6; 4	6; 3
4	(United Kingdom) (Germany)	Bunny Austin; Daniel Prenn	6; 3	6; 4	7; 5
5	(United Kingdom) (Germany)	Harry Lee; Heinz Landmann	5; 7	6; 3	6; 2	6; 3

=== Poland vs. Romania ===
Poland
3
Warsaw, Poland
2–5 May 1930

Romania
2

			1	2	3	4	5
1	(Poland) (Romania)	Maksymilian Stolarow; Nicolae Mișu	3; 6	6; 4	4; 6	1; 6
2	(Poland) (Romania)	Ignacy Tłoczyński; Ghica Poulieff	6; 3	7; 5	6; 4
3	(Poland) (Romania)	Jerzy Stolarow / Maksymilian Stolarow; Nicolae Mișu / Ghica Poulieff	6; 1	2; 6	3; 6	5; 7
4	(Poland) (Romania)	Ignacy Tłoczyński; Nicolae Mișu	6; 3	7; 9	7; 5	4; 6	6; 0
5	(Poland) (Romania)	Maksymilian Stolarow; Ghica Poulieff	3; 6	6; 1	6; 2	7; 9	6; 3

=== Switzerland vs. Australia ===
Switzerland
0
Zürich, Switzerland
2–4 May 1930

Australia
5

			1	2	3	4	5
1	(Switzerland) (Australia)	Hector Chiesa; Edgar Moon	6; 3	2; 6	1; 6	1; 6
2	(Switzerland) (Australia)	Charles Aeschlimann; Jack Crawford	0; 6	3; 6	1; 6
3	(Switzerland) (Australia)	Charles Aeschlimann / Jean Wuarin; Harry Hopman / James Willard	6; 2	4; 6	2; 6	3; 6
4	(Switzerland) (Australia)	Hector Chiesa; Jack Crawford	4; 6	8; 10	3; 6
5	(Switzerland) (Australia)	Charles Aeschlimann; Edgar Moon	6; 3	1; 6	4; 6	3; 6

=== Ireland vs. Monaco ===
Ireland
4
Fitzwilliam Lawn Tennis Club, Dublin, Ireland
3–6 May 1930
Grass

Monaco
1

			1	2	3	4	5
1	(Republic of Ireland) (Monaco)	Edward McGuire; René Gallèpe	2; 6	5; 7	5; 7
2	(Republic of Ireland) (Monaco)	George Lyttleton-Rogers; Vladimir Landau	6; 1	6; 4	6; 2
3	(Republic of Ireland) (Monaco)	Vincent Allman-Smith / George Lyttleton-Rogers; René Gallèpe / Vladimir Landau	6; 1	6; 1	6; 4
4	(Republic of Ireland) (Monaco)	Edward McGuire; Vladimir Landau	13; 11	0; 6	2; 6	6; 4	6; 1
5	(Republic of Ireland) (Monaco)	George Lyttleton-Rogers; René Gallèpe	2; 6	8; 6	6; 2	11; 9

=== Greece vs. India ===
Greece
2
Athens, Greece
19–22 April 1930

India
3

			1	2	3	4	5
1	(Greece) (India)	Orestis Garangiotis; Janmeja Charanjiva	5; 7	6; 1	2; 6	4; 6
2	(Greece) (India)	Augustos Zerlendis; Hira-Lal Soni	6; 3	4; 6	7; 5	6; 1
3	(Greece) (India)	Max Balli / Orestis Garangiotis; Janmeja Charanjiva / Hira-Lal Soni	2; 6	6; 3	1; 6	7; 9
4	(Greece) (India)	Augustos Zerlendis; Janmeja Charanjiva	6; 4	6; 2	3; 6	6; 4
5	(Greece) (India)	Orestis Garangiotis; Hira-Lal Soni	9; 11	4; 6	7; 5	4; 6

=== Hungary vs. Japan ===
Hungary
0
Budapest, Hungary
2–4 May 1930

Japan
4

			1	2	3	4	5
1	(Hungary) (Japan)	Imre Takáts; Yoshiro Ota	1; 6	4; 6	0; 6
2	(Hungary) (Japan)	Béla von Kehrling; Takeichi Harada	6; 2	3; 6	6; 8	2; 6
3	(Hungary) (Japan)	Pál Aschner / Béla von Kehrling; Tamio Abe / Takeichi Harada	2; 6	2; 6	6; 3	4; 6
4	(Hungary) (Japan)	Imre Takáts; Hyotaro Sato	4; 6	3; 6	3; 6
5	(Hungary) (Japan)	Béla von Kehrling; Yoshiro Ota	4; 6	6; 4	7; 5	6; 6		not completed

=== Belgium vs. Spain ===
Belgium
1
Royal Beerschot Athletic Club, Antwerp, Belgium
2–4 May 1930

Spain
4

			1	2	3	4	5
1	(Belgium) (Spain)	André Lacroix; Enrique Maier	6; 3	1; 6	6; 2	2; 6	3; 6
2	(Belgium) (Spain)	Andre Ewbank; Antonio Juanico	6; 3	7; 5	2; 6	2; 6	6; 1
3	(Belgium) (Spain)	Léopold de Borman / Andre Ewbank; Enrique Maier / Ricardo Saprissa	1; 6	6; 4	6; 1	6; 8	3; 6
4	(Belgium) (Spain)	Andre Ewbank; Enrique Maier	2; 6	1; 6	1; 6
5	(Belgium) (Spain)	André Lacroix; Antonio Juanico	3; 6	3; 6	5; 7

=== Yugoslavia vs. Sweden ===
Yugoslavia
5
Beograd Tennis Klub, Belgrade, Yugoslavia
2–4 May 1930
Clay

Sweden
0

			1	2	3	4	5
1	(Kingdom of Yugoslavia) (Sweden)	Krešimir Friedrich; Harry Ramberg	6; 3	1; 6	6; 4	5; 7	6; 4
2	(Kingdom of Yugoslavia) (Sweden)	Franjo Šefer; John Söderström	4; 6	6; 3	6; 1	6; 0
3	(Kingdom of Yugoslavia) (Sweden)	Ivan Radović / Franjo Šefer; Harry Ramberg / John Söderström	6; 3	6; 1	5; 7	6; 2
4	(Kingdom of Yugoslavia) (Sweden)	Franjo Šefer; Harry Ramberg	6; 0	3; 1				retired
5	(Kingdom of Yugoslavia) (Sweden)	Krešimir Friedrich; John Söderström	6; 3	6; 2	6; 2

== Second round ==
=== Norway vs. Austria ===
Norway
0
Oslo, Norway
16–19 May 1930
Clay

Austria
5

			1	2	3	4	5
1	(Norway) (Austria)	Torleif Torkildsen; Hermann von Artens	4; 6	3; 6	4; 6
2	(Norway) (Austria)	Jack Nielsen; Franz-Wilhelm Matejka	2; 6	1; 6	0; 6
3	(Norway) (Austria)	Rolf Christoffersen / Jack Nielsen; Hermann von Artens / Franz-Wilhelm Matejka	2; 6	4; 6	3; 6
4	(Norway) (Austria)	Jack Nielsen; Hermann von Artens	6; 0	1; 6	1; 6	5; 7
5	(Norway) (Austria)	Torleif Torkildsen; Franz-Wilhelm Matejka	1; 6	2; 6	1; 6

=== Italy vs. Egypt ===
Italy
5
Rome, Italy
9–11 May 1930
Clay

Egypt
0

			1	2	3	4	5
1	(Italy) (Egypt)	Giorgio de Stefani; Jacques Grandguillot	6; 2	6; 1	6; 2
2	(Italy) (Egypt)	Uberto De Morpurgo; Loutfalla Wahid	6; 1	6; 4	6; 2
3	(Italy) (Egypt)	Placido Gaslini / Uberto De Morpurgo; A. Riches / Nicolas Zahar	5; 7	8; 6	6; 1	3; 6	7; 5
4	(Italy) (Egypt)	Giorgio de Stefani; A. Riches	6; 0	6; 2	6; 0
5	(Italy) (Egypt)	Uberto De Morpurgo; Jacques Grandguillot	6; 4	6; 1	6; 2

=== Great Britain vs. Poland ===
Great Britain
5
Abbey Park Gardens, Torquay, England
10–12 May 1930
Clay

Poland
0

			1	2	3	4	5
1	(United Kingdom) (Poland)	Harry Lee; Ignacy Tłoczyński	6; 1	6; 4	6; 2
2	(United Kingdom) (Poland)	Nigel Sharpe; Maksymilian Stolarow	6; 3	6; 4	6; 1
3	(United Kingdom) (Poland)	Ian Collins / Colin Gregory; Ignacy Tłoczyński / Przemyslaw Warminski	6; 0	6; 0	6; 0
4	(United Kingdom) (Poland)	Harry Lee; Maksymilian Stolarow	6; 4	6; 2	8; 6
5	(United Kingdom) (Poland)	Nigel Sharpe; Ignacy Tłoczyński	6; 2	6; 1	6; 1

=== Ireland vs. Australia ===
Ireland
1
Fitzwilliam Lawn Tennis Club, Dublin, Ireland
15–17 May 1930
Grass

Australia
4

			1	2	3	4	5
1	(Republic of Ireland) (Australia)	Edward McGuire; Jack Crawford	1; 6	2; 6	4; 6
2	(Republic of Ireland) (Australia)	George Lyttleton-Rogers; Edgar Moon	6; 4	6; 2	3; 6	2; 6	10; 12
3	(Republic of Ireland) (Australia)	Vincent Allman-Smith / George Lyttleton-Rogers; Harry Hopman / James Willard	4; 6	2; 6	2; 6
4	(Republic of Ireland) (Australia)	George Lyttleton-Rogers; Jack Crawford	6; 3	3; 6	7; 5	2; 6	6; 3
5	(Republic of Ireland) (Australia)	Edward McGuire; Edgar Moon	2; 6	5; 7	6; 3	6; 8

=== Japan vs. India ===
Japan
5
Royal Botanic Society Lawn Tennis Club, London, England
15–17 May 1930
Clay

India
0

			1	2	3	4	5
1	(Japan) (India)	Yoshiro Ota; Atri-Madan Mohan	6; 2	7; 5	6; 4
2	(Japan) (India)	Takeichi Harada; Janmeja Charanjiva	6; 3	6; 3	6; 1
3	(Japan) (India)	Tamio Abe / Takeichi Harada; Janmeja Charanjiva / Hira-Lal Soni	5; 7	4; 6	6; 2	6; 2	6; 2
4	(Japan) (India)	Yoshiro Ota; Hira-Lal Soni	6; 1	6; 4	6; 0
5	(Japan) (India)	Hyotaro Sato; Atri-Madan Mohan	10; 8	6; 1	6; 2

=== Yugoslavia vs. Spain ===
Yugoslavia
0
Zagreb, Yugoslavia
17–20 May 1930

Spain
5

			1	2	3	4	5
1	(Kingdom of Yugoslavia) (Spain)	Franjo Šefer; Enrique Maier	3; 6	4; 6	3; 6
2	(Kingdom of Yugoslavia) (Spain)	Krešimir Friedrich; Antonio Juanico	0; 6	1; 6	3; 6
3	(Kingdom of Yugoslavia) (Spain)	Franjo Kukuljević / Ivan Radović; Enrique Maier / José María Tejada	0; 6	11; 9	7; 5	4; 6	0; 6
4	(Kingdom of Yugoslavia) (Spain)	Franjo Kukuljević; Enrique Maier	1; 6	3; 6	2; 6
5	(Kingdom of Yugoslavia) (Spain)	Franjo Šefer; Antonio Juanico	13; 11	4; 6	2; 6	3; 6

=== Czechoslovakia vs. Denmark ===
Czechoslovakia
3
Prague, Czechoslovakia
16–18 May 1930

Denmark
2

			1	2	3	4	5
1	(Czechoslovakia) (Denmark)	Roderich Menzel; Erik Worm	6; 2	6; 2	4; 6	6; 2
2	(Czechoslovakia) (Denmark)	Jan Koželuh; Einer Ulrich	6; 0	2; 6	5; 7	6; 3	5; 7
3	(Czechoslovakia) (Denmark)	Roderich Menzel / Friedrich Rohrer; Einer Ulrich / Erik Worm	6; 3	1; 6	6; 4	4; 6	7; 9
4	(Czechoslovakia) (Denmark)	Roderich Menzel; Einer Ulrich	6; 2	6; 2	6; 1
5	(Czechoslovakia) (Denmark)	Jan Koželuh; Erik Worm	7; 5	6; 2	10; 8

=== Netherlands vs. Finland ===
Netherlands
4
Amsterdam, Netherlands
16–18 May 1930
Clay

Finland
1

			1	2	3	4	5
1	(Netherlands) (Finland)	Hendrik Timmer; Bo Grotenfelt	6; 1	6; 1	6; 0
2	(Netherlands) (Finland)	Arthur Diemer-Kool; Arne Grahn	6; 8	6; 8	4; 6
3	(Netherlands) (Finland)	Arthur Diemer-Kool / Hendrik Timmer; Arne Grahn / Runar Granholm	6; 4	6; 1	6; 2
4	(Netherlands) (Finland)	Hendrik Timmer; Arne Grahn	6; 1	6; 3	6; 2
5	(Netherlands) (Finland)	Arthur Diemer-Kool; Bo Grotenfelt	6; 2	6; 0	6; 0

== Quarterfinals ==
=== Austria vs. Italy ===
Austria
2
Vienna, Austria
6–8 June 1930

Italy
3

			1	2	3	4	5
1	(Austria) (Italy)	Hermann von Artens; Placido Gaslini	8; 6	6; 2	6; 2
2	(Austria) (Italy)	Franz-Wilhelm Matejka; Uberto De Morpurgo	2; 6	2; 6	3; 6
3	(Austria) (Italy)	Hermann von Artens / Franz-Wilhelm Matejka; Placido Gaslini / Uberto De Morpurgo	11; 9	6; 8	1; 6	6; 1	4; 6
4	(Austria) (Italy)	Franz-Wilhelm Matejka; Placido Gaslini	6; 3	6; 4	7; 5
5	(Austria) (Italy)	Hermann von Artens; Uberto De Morpurgo	2; 6	2; 6	2; 6

=== Great Britain vs. Australia ===
Great Britain
1
Devonshire Park Lawn Tennis Club, Eastbourne, England
6–9 June 1930
Grass

Australia
4

			1	2	3	4	5
1	(United Kingdom) (Australia)	Harry Lee; Jack Crawford	6; 3	2; 6	6; 4	2; 6	2; 6
2	(United Kingdom) (Australia)	Colin Gregory; Harry Hopman	6; 8	4; 6	7; 9
3	(United Kingdom) (Australia)	Ian Collins / Colin Gregory; Jack Crawford / Harry Hopman	8; 6	10; 8	6; 2
4	(United Kingdom) (Australia)	Harry Lee; Harry Hopman	3; 6	6; 4	9; 7	2; 6	4; 6
5	(United Kingdom) (Australia)	Colin Gregory; Jack Crawford	2; 6	5; 7	8; 6	3; 6

=== Spain vs. Japan ===
Spain
1
Exposición de Barcelona, Barcelona, Spain
7–9 June 1930
Clay

Japan
4

			1	2	3	4	5
1	(Spain) (Japan)	Antonio Juanico; Yoshiro Ota	1; 6	6; 3	2; 6	2; 6
2	(Spain) (Japan)	Enrique Maier; Takeichi Harada	6; 3	2; 6	0; 6	4; 6
3	(Spain) (Japan)	Enrique Maier / Francisco Sindreu; Tamio Abe / Takeichi Harada	2; 6	6; 4	6; 4	6; 4
4	(Spain) (Japan)	Antonio Juanico; Takeichi Harada	0; 6	3; 6	3; 6
5	(Spain) (Japan)	Enrique Maier; Yoshiro Ota	1; 6	1; 6	1; 6

=== Netherlands vs. Czechoslovakia ===
Netherlands
2
Scheveningen, Netherlands
30 May–1 June 1930
Clay

Czechoslovakia
3

			1	2	3	4	5
1	(Netherlands) (Czechoslovakia)	Hendrik Timmer; Jan Koželuh	6; 1	6; 3	6; 1
2	(Netherlands) (Czechoslovakia)	Arthur Diemer-Kool; Roderich Menzel	3; 6	3; 6	2; 6
3	(Netherlands) (Czechoslovakia)	Arthur Diemer-Kool / Hendrik Timmer; Jan Koželuh / Roderich Menzel	9; 7	2; 6	1; 6	6; 3	4; 6
4	(Netherlands) (Czechoslovakia)	Hendrik Timmer; Roderich Menzel	8; 6	6; 0	4; 6	7; 5
5	(Netherlands) (Czechoslovakia)	Arthur Diemer-Kool; Jan Koželuh	4; 6	6; 4	3; 6	3; 6

== Semifinals ==
=== Italy vs. Australia ===
Italy
3
Milan, Italy
14–16 June 1930
Clay

Australia
2

			1	2	3	4	5
1	(Italy) (Australia)	Giorgio de Stefani; Harry Hopman	6; 3	3; 6	7; 5	6; 2
2	(Italy) (Australia)	Uberto De Morpurgo; Jack Crawford	5; 7	6; 2	6; 4	3; 6	6; 4
3	(Italy) (Australia)	Placido Gaslini / Uberto De Morpurgo; Harry Hopman / James Willard	7; 9	7; 9	6; 4	4; 6
4	(Italy) (Australia)	Uberto De Morpurgo; Harry Hopman	8; 6	2; 6	6; 4	1; 6	6; 1
5	(Italy) (Australia)	Giorgio de Stefani; Jack Crawford	4; 6	3; 6	2; 6

=== Czechoslovakia vs. Japan ===
Czechoslovakia
2
Prague, Czechoslovakia
14–16 June 1930

Japan
3

			1	2	3	4	5
1	(Czechoslovakia) (Japan)	Roderich Menzel; Takeichi Harada	9; 11	6; 3	7; 5	6; 1
2	(Czechoslovakia) (Japan)	Jan Koželuh; Yoshiro Ota	4; 6	6; 4	4; 6	5; 7
3	(Czechoslovakia) (Japan)	Jan Koželuh / Roderich Menzel; Tamio Abe / Takeichi Harada	6; 1	5; 7	6; 8	7; 9
4	(Czechoslovakia) (Japan)	Jan Koželuh; Takeichi Harada	2; 6	3; 6	3; 6
5	(Czechoslovakia) (Japan)	Roderich Menzel; Yoshiro Ota	6; 2	4; 6	6; 3	6; 3

== Final ==
=== Italy vs. Japan ===
Italy
3
Genoa, Italy
11–13 July 1930
Clay

Japan
2

			1	2	3	4	5
1	(Italy) (Japan)	Uberto De Morpurgo; Takeichi Harada	4; 6	3; 6	5; 7
2	(Italy) (Japan)	Giorgio de Stefani; Yoshiro Ota	6; 3	6; 4	4; 6	6; 4
3	(Italy) (Japan)	Uberto De Morpurgo / Giorgio de Stefani; Tamio Abe / Takeichi Harada	8; 6	9; 7	6; 8	2; 6	6; 1
4	(Italy) (Japan)	Giorgio de Stefani; Takeichi Harada	2; 6	5; 7	5; 7
5	(Italy) (Japan)	Uberto De Morpurgo; Yoshiro Ota	6; 0	6; 2	6; 1
