= 1929 International Lawn Tennis Challenge Europe Zone =

International tennis competition

The Europe Zone was one of the two regional zones of the 1929 International Lawn Tennis Challenge.

24 teams entered the Europe Zone, with the winner going on to compete in the Inter-Zonal Final against the winner of the America Zone. Germany defeated Great Britain in the final, and went on to face the United States in the Inter-Zonal Final.

== Draw ==
First round 29 March–12 May
Italy
bye
Ireland
bye
Spain
bye
Germany
bye
Denmark	4
Chile	1
Greece	4
Yugoslavia	1
Belgium	4
Romania	1
Austria	2
Czechoslovakia	3
Hungary	4
Norway	1
Monaco	3
Switzerland	2
Finland	1
Egypt	4
Netherlands	w/o
Portugal
bye
Sweden
bye
South Africa
bye
Poland
bye
Great Britain

Second round 10–19 May
Dublin, Ireland (grass)
Italy	5
Ireland	0
Barcelona, Spain (clay)
Spain	1
Germany	4
Copenhagen, Denmark
Denmark	4
Greece	1
Prague, Czechoslovakia
Belgium	0
Czechoslovakia	3
Budapest, Hungary
Hungary	3
Monaco	2
The Hague, Netherlands (clay)
Egypt	1
Netherlands	4
Saltsjöbaden, Sweden (clay)
Sweden	0
South Africa	5
Warsaw, Poland (clay)
Poland	0
Great Britain	5

Quarterfinals; 5–9 June
Hamburg, Germany
Italy	2
Germany	3
Copenhagen, Denmark
Denmark	1
Czechoslovakia	4
Budapest, Hungary
Hungary	3
Netherlands	2
Bournemouth, England (grass)
Great Britain	5
South Africa	0

Semifinals; 14–21 June
Prague, Czechoslovakia
Germany	4
Czechoslovakia	1
Budapest, Hungary (clay)
Hungary	2
Great Britain	3

Final; 12–14 July
Berlin, Germany (clay)
Germany	3
Great Britain	2

== First round ==
=== Denmark vs. Chile ===
Denmark
4
Copenhagen, Denmark
4–6 May 1929

Chile
1

			1	2	3	4	5
1	(Denmark) (Chile)	Povl Henriksen; Luis Torralva Ponsa	8; 6	7; 5	7; 5
2	(Denmark) (Chile)	Einer Ulrich; Domingo Torralva Ponsa	6; 2	6; 4	7; 5
3	(Denmark) (Chile)	Povl Henriksen / Einer Ulrich; Domingo Torralva Ponsa / Luis Torralva Ponsa	6; 2	6; 3	6; 4
4	(Denmark) (Chile)	Povl Henriksen; Domingo Torralva Ponsa	5; 7	7; 5	6; 4	6; 4
5	(Denmark) (Chile)	Einer Ulrich; Luis Torralva Ponsa	5; 7	4; 6	6; 8

=== Greece vs. Yugoslavia ===
Greece
4
Athens, Greece
4–6 May 1929

Yugoslavia
1

			1	2	3	4	5
1	(Greece) (Kingdom of Yugoslavia)	Augustos Zerlendis; Krešimir Friedrich	6; 3	6; 0	6; 2
2	(Greece) (Kingdom of Yugoslavia)	Costas Efstratiadis; Franjo Šefer	6; 2	7; 5	3; 6	6; 3
3	(Greece) (Kingdom of Yugoslavia)	I. Georgiadis / Augustos Zerlendis; Krešimir Friedrich / Franjo Šefer	6; 3	6; 3	6; 3
4	(Greece) (Kingdom of Yugoslavia)	Costas Efstratiadis; Krešimir Friedrich	1; 6	3; 6	4; 6
5	(Greece) (Kingdom of Yugoslavia)	Augustos Zerlendis; Franjo Šefer	6; 4	7; 5	6; 4

=== Belgium vs. Romania ===
Belgium
4
Brussels, Belgium
4–6 May 1929

Romania
1

			1	2	3	4	5
1	(Belgium) (Romania)	André Lacroix; Nicolae Mișu	6; 2	6; 4	3; 6	6; 3
2	(Belgium) (Romania)	Andre Ewbank; Gheorghe Lupu	6; 2	4; 6	6; 2	6; 4
3	(Belgium) (Romania)	Andre Ewbank / André Lacroix; Laszlo Dorner / Gheorghe Lupu	7; 5	6; 2	6; 1
4	(Belgium) (Romania)	André Lacroix; Gheorghe Lupu	8; 6	6; 4	6; 3
5	(Belgium) (Romania)	Andre Ewbank; Nicolae Mișu	2; 6	4; 6	8; 6	3; 6

=== Austria vs. Czechoslovakia ===
Austria
2
Vienna, Austria
26–28 April 1929

Czechoslovakia
3

			1	2	3	4	5
1	(Austria) (Czechoslovakia)	Franz-Wilhelm Matejka; Jan Koželuh	6; 3	7; 5	6; 1
2	(Austria) (Czechoslovakia)	Hermann von Artens; Roderich Menzel	3; 6	4; 6	2; 6
3	(Austria) (Czechoslovakia)	Hermann von Artens / Franz-Wilhelm Matejka; Jan Koželuh / Pavel Macenauer	4; 6	5; 7	2; 6
4	(Austria) (Czechoslovakia)	Franz-Wilhelm Matejka; Roderich Menzel	10; 8	6; 3	6; 1
5	(Austria) (Czechoslovakia)	Hermann von Artens; Jan Koželuh	4; 6	3; 6	10; 8	4; 6

=== Norway vs. Hungary ===
Norway
1
Oslo, Norway
10–12 May 1929
Clay

Hungary
4

			1	2	3	4	5
1	(Norway) (Hungary)	Jack Nielsen; Imre Takáts	1; 6	1; 6	5; 7
2	(Norway) (Hungary)	Jack Nielsen; Béla von Kehrling	9; 11	6; 1	2; 6	2; 6
3	(Norway) (Hungary)	Jack Nielsen / Torleif Torkildsen; Béla von Kehrling / Jenő Péteri	4; 6	4; 6	1; 6
4	(Norway) (Hungary)	Torleif Torkildsen; Imre Takáts	1; 6	6; 1	6; 1	6; 2
5	(Norway) (Hungary)	Torleif Torkildsen; Béla von Kehrling	1; 6	2; 6	1; 6

=== Monaco vs. Switzerland ===
Monaco
3
Monte Carlo, Monaco
29–31 Mar 1929

Switzerland
2

			1	2	3	4	5
1	(Monaco) (Switzerland)	René Gallèpe; Charles Aeschlimann	7; 5	3; 6	5; 7	6; 3	5; 7
2	(Monaco) (Switzerland)	Vladimir Landau; Jean Wuarin	4; 6	6; 3	6; 2	6; 2
3	(Monaco) (Switzerland)	René Gallèpe / Vladimir Landau; Charles Aeschlimann / Jean Wuarin	4; 6	6; 4	6; 4	3; 6	8; 6
4	(Monaco) (Switzerland)	Vladimir Landau; Charles Aeschlimann	2; 6	1; 6	2; 6
5	(Monaco) (Switzerland)	René Gallèpe; Jean Wuarin	6; 3	6; 8	6; 4	6; 4

=== Finland vs. Egypt ===
Finland
1
Helsinki, Finland
4–7 May 1929

Egypt
4

			1	2	3	4	5
1	(Finland) (Egypt)	Runar Granholm; Loutfalla Wahid	6; 4	6; 4	6; 3
2	(Finland) (Egypt)	Arne Grahn; Jacques Grandguillot	6; 1	4; 6	2; 6	7; 5	4; 6
3	(Finland) (Egypt)	Arne Grahn / Bo Grotenfelt; Jacques Grandguillot / Nicolas Zahar	5; 7	2; 6	3; 6
4	(Finland) (Egypt)	Runar Granholm; Jacques Grandguillot	6; 2	6; 3	3; 6	5; 7	2; 6
5	(Finland) (Egypt)	Arne Grahn; Loutfalla Wahid	6; 3	0; 6	2; 6	3; 6

== Second round ==
=== Ireland vs. Italy ===
Ireland
0
Fitzwilliam Lawn Tennis Club, Dublin, Ireland
16–18 May 1929
Grass

Italy
5

			1	2	3	4	5
1	(Republic of Ireland) (Italy)	George Lyttleton-Rogers; Uberto De Morpurgo	6; 8	1; 6	7; 5	2; 6
2	(Republic of Ireland) (Italy)	Edward McGuire; Giorgio de Stefani	4; 6	6; 4	6; 8	6; 4	6; 8
3	(Republic of Ireland) (Italy)	Noel Galway Holmes / George Lyttleton-Rogers; Alberto del Bono / Uberto De Morpurgo	4; 6	5; 7	5; 7
4	(Republic of Ireland) (Italy)	George Lyttleton-Rogers; Giorgio de Stefani	6; 4	5; 7	2; 6	5; 7
5	(Republic of Ireland) (Italy)	Edward McGuire; Uberto De Morpurgo	0; 6	7; 5	4; 6	2; 6

=== Spain vs. Germany ===
Spain
1
Societat Sportiva Pompeya, Barcelona, Spain
11–13 May 1929
Clay

Germany
4

			1	2	3	4	5
1	(Spain) (Germany)	Enrique Maier; Hans Moldenhauer	1; 6	2; 6	3; 6
2	(Spain) (Germany)	Francisco Sindreu; Daniel Prenn	3; 6	7; 5	4; 6	6; 4	4; 6
3	(Spain) (Germany)	Enrique Maier / José María Tejada; Hans Moldenhauer / Daniel Prenn	3; 6	6; 1	5; 7	1; 6
4	(Spain) (Germany)	José María Tejada; Hans Moldenhauer	0; 6	2; 6	3; 6
5	(Spain) (Germany)	Enrique Maier; Heinrich Kleinschroth	7; 5	3; 6				retired

=== Denmark vs. Greece ===
Denmark
4
Copenhagen, Denmark
17–19 May 1929

Greece
1

			1	2	3	4	5
1	(Denmark) (Greece)	Einer Ulrich; Augustos Zerlendis	6; 3	6; 8	5; 7	15; 17
2	(Denmark) (Greece)	Povl Henriksen; Georgios Zafiropoulos	6; 4	6; 4	6; 1
3	(Denmark) (Greece)	Povl Henriksen / Einer Ulrich; Georgios Zafiropoulos / Augustos Zerlendis	6; 2	6; 4	6; 3
4	(Denmark) (Greece)	Einer Ulrich; Georgios Zafiropoulos	6; 3	6; 4	6; 2
5	(Denmark) (Greece)	Povl Henriksen; Augustos Zerlendis	6; 0	7; 5	6; 4

=== Czechoslovakia vs. Belgium ===
Czechoslovakia
3
Prague, Czechoslovakia
10–12 May 1929

Belgium
0

			1	2	3	4	5
1	(Czechoslovakia) (Belgium)	Roderich Menzel; André Lacroix	6; 3	6; 1	6; 1
2	(Czechoslovakia) (Belgium)	Jan Koželuh; Andre Ewbank	7; 5	12; 10	6; 4
3	(Czechoslovakia) (Belgium)	Jan Koželuh / Pavel Macenauer; Andre Ewbank / André Lacroix	6; 2	6; 3	6; 4
4	(Czechoslovakia) (Belgium)	Josef Maleček; André Lacroix	3; 6	6; 3	0; 1			not completed
5	(Czechoslovakia) (Belgium)	Roderich Menzel; Andre Ewbank						not played

=== Hungary vs. Monaco ===
Hungary
3
Budapest, Hungary
14–16 May 1929

Monaco
2

			1	2	3	4	5
1	(Hungary) (Monaco)	Imre Takáts; René Gallèpe	6; 3	1; 6	9; 7	8; 6
2	(Hungary) (Monaco)	Béla von Kehrling; Vladimir Landau	6; 4	6; 4	6; 2
3	(Hungary) (Monaco)	Béla von Kehrling / Jenő Péteri; René Gallèpe / Vladimir Landau	4; 6	6; 3	2; 6	8; 10
4	(Hungary) (Monaco)	Béla von Kehrling; René Gallèpe	6; 0	6; 3	6; 1
5	(Hungary) (Monaco)	Imre Takáts; Vladimir Landau	3; 6	2; 6	3; 6

=== Netherlands vs. Egypt ===
Netherlands
4
The Hague, Netherlands
17–19 May 1929
Clay

Egypt
1

			1	2	3	4	5
1	(Netherlands) (Egypt)	Arthur Diemer-Kool; Jacques Grandguillot	2; 6	6; 1	10; 8	4; 6	1; 6
2	(Netherlands) (Egypt)	Hendrik Timmer; Loutfalla Wahid	3; 6	6; 2	6; 1	6; 2
3	(Netherlands) (Egypt)	Arthur Diemer-Kool / Hendrik Timmer; Rene Danon / Nicolas Zahar	9; 7	6; 8	6; 4	6; 1
4	(Netherlands) (Egypt)	Hendrik Timmer; Jacques Grandguillot	7; 5	6; 0	3; 6	6; 2
5	(Netherlands) (Egypt)	Arthur Diemer-Kool; Nicolas Zahar	2; 6	8; 6	6; 2	6; 1

=== Sweden vs. South Africa ===
Sweden
0
Saltsjöbaden, Sweden
17–19 May 1929
Clay

South Africa
5

			1	2	3	4	5
1	(Sweden) (South Africa)	Sune Malmström; Louis Raymond	2; 6	3; 6	2; 6
2	(Sweden) (South Africa)	Curt Östberg; Colin Robbins	2; 6	1; 6	1; 6
3	(Sweden) (South Africa)	Henning Müller / Curt Östberg; Norman Farquharson / Louis Raymond	6; 8	2; 6	2; 6
4	(Sweden) (South Africa)	Curt Östberg; Louis Raymond	5; 7	0; 6	0; 6
5	(Sweden) (South Africa)	Sune Malmström; Colin Robbins	8; 6	8; 10	7; 9	4; 6

=== Poland vs. Great Britain ===
Poland
0
Warsaw, Poland
10–12 May 1929
Clay

Great Britain
5

			1	2	3	4	5
1	(Poland) (United Kingdom)	Andrzej Tarnowski; Bunny Austin	1; 6	1; 6	1; 6
2	(Poland) (United Kingdom)	Maksymilian Stolarow; Pat Hughes	5; 7	1; 6	2; 6
3	(Poland) (United Kingdom)	Jan Loth / Maksymilian Stolarow; Gordon Crole-Rees / Cyril Eames	1; 6	4; 6	3; 6
4	(Poland) (United Kingdom)	Maksymilian Stolarow; Bunny Austin	1; 6	9; 11	5; 7
5	(Poland) (United Kingdom)	Andrzej Tarnowski; Pat Hughes	1; 6	0; 6	5; 7

== Quarterfinals ==
=== Germany vs. Italy ===
Germany
3
Hamburg, Germany
7–9 June 1929

Italy
2

			1	2	3	4	5
1	(Germany) (Italy)	Heinz Landmann; Giorgio de Stefani	3; 6	6; 4	6; 3	3; 6	6; 3
2	(Germany) (Italy)	Hans Moldenhauer; Uberto De Morpurgo	5; 7	6; 3	6; 3	3; 6	6; 2
3	(Germany) (Italy)	Hans Moldenhauer / Daniel Prenn; Alberto del Bono / Uberto De Morpurgo	6; 8	3; 6	3; 6
4	(Germany) (Italy)	Heinz Landmann; Uberto De Morpurgo	4; 6	0; 6	5; 7
5	(Germany) (Italy)	Hans Moldenhauer; Giorgio de Stefani	6; 3	3; 6	5; 7	6; 4	6; 3

=== Denmark vs. Czechoslovakia ===
Denmark
1
Copenhagen, Denmark
5–7 June 1929

Czechoslovakia
4

			1	2	3	4	5
1	(Denmark) (Czechoslovakia)	Povl Henriksen; Roderich Menzel	7; 9	2; 6	3; 6
2	(Denmark) (Czechoslovakia)	Einer Ulrich; Jan Koželuh	4; 6	5; 7	6; 1	6; 2	6; 2
3	(Denmark) (Czechoslovakia)	Povl Henriksen / Einer Ulrich; Jan Koželuh / Pavel Macenauer	1; 6	6; 4	4; 6	2; 6
4	(Denmark) (Czechoslovakia)	Einer Ulrich; Roderich Menzel	5; 7	5; 7	2; 6
5	(Denmark) (Czechoslovakia)	Povl Henriksen; Jan Koželuh	7; 5	2; 6	2; 6	4; 6

=== Hungary vs. Netherlands ===
Hungary
3
Budapest, Hungary
7–9 June 1929

Netherlands
2

			1	2	3	4	5
1	(Hungary) (Netherlands)	Béla von Kehrling; Arthur Diemer-Kool	6; 2	6; 1	6; 2
2	(Hungary) (Netherlands)	Imre Takáts; Hendrik Timmer	5; 7	7; 5	6; 8	6; 1	6; 4
3	(Hungary) (Netherlands)	Béla von Kehrling / Imre Takáts; Arthur Diemer-Kool / Hendrik Timmer	6; 1	2; 6	6; 4	3; 6	2; 6
4	(Hungary) (Netherlands)	Imre Takáts; Arthur Diemer-Kool	2; 6	2; 6	4; 6
5	(Hungary) (Netherlands)	Béla von Kehrling; Hendrik Timmer	8; 6	6; 3	3; 6	6; 3

=== Great Britain vs. South Africa ===
Great Britain
5
West Hants Lawn Tennis Club, Bournemouth, England
6–8 June 1929
Grass

South Africa
0

			1	2	3	4	5
1	(United Kingdom) (South Africa)	Bunny Austin; Louis Raymond	8; 6	6; 1	2; 6	6; 3
2	(United Kingdom) (South Africa)	Colin Gregory; Colin Robbins	6; 1	6; 1	6; 4
3	(United Kingdom) (South Africa)	Ian Collins / Colin Gregory; Norman Farquharson / Louis Raymond	2; 6	6; 3	6; 2	6; 1
4	(United Kingdom) (South Africa)	Bunny Austin; Colin Robbins	6; 0	6; 4	6; 1
5	(United Kingdom) (South Africa)	Colin Gregory; Louis Raymond	6; 4	6; 1	6; 2

== Semifinals ==
=== Czechoslovakia vs. Germany ===
Czechoslovakia
1
Prague, Czechoslovakia
19–21 June 1929

Germany
4

			1	2	3	4	5
1	(Czechoslovakia) (Germany)	Pavel Macenauer; Hans Moldenhauer	3; 6	4; 6	6; 8
2	(Czechoslovakia) (Germany)	Roderich Menzel; Heinz Landmann	6; 3	6; 3	3; 6	0; 6	6; 4
3	(Czechoslovakia) (Germany)	Jan Koželuh / Pavel Macenauer; Hans Moldenhauer / Daniel Prenn	2; 6	2; 6	3; 6
4	(Czechoslovakia) (Germany)	Roderich Menzel; Hans Moldenhauer	4; 6	6; 8	4; 6
5	(Czechoslovakia) (Germany)	Pavel Macenauer; Daniel Prenn	3; 6	5; 7	5; 7

=== Hungary vs. Great Britain ===
Hungary
2
Budapest, Hungary
14–16 June 1929
Clay

Great Britain
3

			1	2	3	4	5
1	(Hungary) (United Kingdom)	Béla von Kehrling; Colin Gregory	5; 7	7; 5	5; 7	6; 2	6; 3
2	(Hungary) (United Kingdom)	Imre Takáts; Bunny Austin	4; 6	2; 6	2; 6
3	(Hungary) (United Kingdom)	Pál Aschner / Béla von Kehrling; Ian Collins / Colin Gregory	2; 6	6; 4	2; 6	3; 6
4	(Hungary) (United Kingdom)	Béla von Kehrling; Bunny Austin	3; 6	6; 4	6; 2	6; 2
5	(Hungary) (United Kingdom)	Imre Takáts; Colin Gregory	1; 6	0; 6	3; 6

== Final ==
=== Germany vs. Great Britain ===
Germany
3
Rot-Weiss Tennis Club, Berlin, Germany
12–14 July 1929
Clay

Great Britain
2

			1	2	3	4	5
1	(Germany) (United Kingdom)	Daniel Prenn; Colin Gregory	6; 3	6; 3	6; 2
2	(Germany) (United Kingdom)	Hans Moldenhauer; Bunny Austin	6; 4	6; 2	6; 3
3	(Germany) (United Kingdom)	Heinrich Kleinschroth / Heinz Landmann; Ian Collins / Colin Gregory	4; 6	2; 6	0; 6
4	(Germany) (United Kingdom)	Hans Moldenhauer; Colin Gregory	0; 6	2; 6	3; 6
5	(Germany) (United Kingdom)	Daniel Prenn; Bunny Austin	4; 6	6; 2	6; 4	4; 6	5; 1	retired
