= Vollmar =

Vollmar may refer to:

- Fritz Vollmar (born 1926), Swiss Director General of the World Wildlife Fund and the World Scout Foundation
- Heinz Vollmar (1936–1987), German football player
- Jocelyn Vollmar (born 1925), American ballerina
- Klausbernd Vollmar (born 1946), German scientific psychologist
- Georg von Vollmar (1850–1922), German socialist politician
- Folmar of Karden (also spelled Vollmar), (circa 1135–1189), Archbishop of Trier
- King Goldemar (King Vollmar), dwarf king from German mythology

== See also ==
- Volmar
- Vollmer
- Folmar (disambiguation)
