= 1929 International Lawn Tennis Challenge America Zone =

The America Zone was one of the two regional zones of the 1929 International Lawn Tennis Challenge.

5 teams entered the America Zone, with the winner going on to compete in the Inter-Zonal Final against the winner of the Europe Zone. The United States defeated Cuba in the final, and went on to face Germany in the Inter-Zonal Final.

== Draw ==
Quarterfinals; 16–18 May
Montreal, Canada (grass)
United States	5
Canada	0
Japan
bye
bye
Cuba
bye
Mexico

Semifinals; 17–25 May
Chevy Chase, MD, United States (clay)
United States	4
Japan	1
Havana, Cuba (clay)
Cuba	4
Mexico	1

Final; 30 May–1 June
Detroit, MI, United States (clay)
United States	5
Cuba	0

== Quarterfinals ==
=== Canada vs. United States ===
Canada
0
Mount Royal Tennis Club, Montreal, Canada
16–18 May 1929
Grass

United States
5

			1	2	3	4	5
1	(Canada) (United States)	Willard Crocker; John Van Ryn	7; 9	2; 6	3; 6
2	(Canada) (United States)	Jack Wright; John Hennessey	3; 6	6; 4	1; 6	5; 7
3	(Canada) (United States)	Arthur Ham / Jack Wright; John Hennessey / John Van Ryn	1; 6	1; 6	6; 1	2; 6
4	(Canada) (United States)	Jack Wright; John Van Ryn	1; 6	0; 6	1; 6
5	(Canada) (United States)	Willard Crocker; Wilmer Allison	6; 2	4; 6	7; 9	6; 4	2; 6

== Semifinals ==
=== United States vs. Japan ===
United States
4
Chevy Chase Lawn Tennis Club, Chevy Chase, MD, United States
23–25 May 1929
Clay

Japan
1

			1	2	3	4	5
1	(United States) (Japan)	John Van Ryn; Tamio Abe	6; 2	4; 6	6; 3	6; 2
2	(United States) (Japan)	John Hennessey; Yoshiro Ota	6; 2	6; 2	6; 3
3	(United States) (Japan)	John Hennessey / John Van Ryn; Tamio Abe / Yoshiro Ota	6; 3	6; 4	6; 2
4	(United States) (Japan)	John Van Ryn; Yoshiro Ota	4; 6	7; 5	6; 2	4; 6	5; 7
5	(United States) (Japan)	John Hennessey; Tamio Abe	8; 6	6; 1	3; 6	6; 1

=== Cuba vs. Mexico ===
Cuba
4
Havana, Cuba
17–20 May 1929
Clay

Mexico
1

			1	2	3	4	5
1	(Cuba) (Mexico)	Vicente Banet; Ignacio de la Borbolla	6; 2	6; 3	8; 6
2	(Cuba) (Mexico)	Gustavo Vollmer; Ricardo Tapia	6; 2	6; 3	6; 1
3	(Cuba) (Mexico)	Ricardo Morales / Germán Upmann; Robert Kinsey / Alfonso Unda	2; 6	12; 10	4; 6	3; 6
4	(Cuba) (Mexico)	Gustavo Vollmer; Ignacio de la Borbolla	6; 3	6; 3	8; 6
5	(Cuba) (Mexico)	Vicente Banet; Ricardo Tapia	6; 3	2; 6	9; 7	6; 3

== Final ==
=== United States vs. Cuba ===
United States
5
Detroit Tennis Club, Detroit, MI, United States
30 May–1 June 1929
Clay

Cuba
0

			1	2	3	4	5
1	(United States) (Cuba)	John Hennessey; Ricardo Morales	6; 0	6; 3	6; 4
2	(United States) (Cuba)	John Van Ryn; Gustavo Vollmer	6; 0	6; 1	6; 1
3	(United States) (Cuba)	Wilmer Allison / John Van Ryn; Ricardo Morales / Germán Upmann	6; 2	6; 0	6; 1
4	(United States) (Cuba)	Wilmer Allison; Gustavo Vollmer	6; 3	6; 2	6; 5
5	(United States) (Cuba)	George Lott; Germán Upmann	6; 4	6; 3	6; 3
