= Volmer =

Volmer may refer to:

== People ==
=== Surname ===
- Arvo Volmer (born 1962), Estonian conductor
- Hardi Volmer (born 1957), Estonian film director, puppet theatre set decorator and musician
- Joost Volmer (born 1974), Dutch footballer
- Max Volmer (1885–1965), German physical chemist
- Peeter Volmer (1940–2002), Estonian baritone singer and actor
- Priit Volmer (born 1978), Estonian opera singer
- Ron Volmer (born 1935), American water polo player who competed in the 1960 Summer Olympics

=== Given name ===
- Volmer Otzen (1899–1979), Danish diver
- Volmer Thomsen (1917–2000), Danish gymnast

== Fictional characters ==
- Rhonda Volmer, in the HBO series Big Love

== Places ==
- Volmer, Alberta, an unincorporated community in Alberta, Canada

== See also ==
- Volmerswerth, a borough in western Düsseldorf, Germany
- Vollmer
