= John Söderström =

Swedish tennis player

- Country (sports): Sweden
- Born: 8 August 1889 Stockholm, Sweden
- Died: 5 June 1982 (aged 92)

Team competitions
- Davis Cup: 1R (Europe) (1930)

John 'Jotte' Söderström (born 8 August 1889) was a Swedish tennis player who was active in the 1920s and 1930s.

== Tennis career ==
Söderström won the Swedish National Indoor singles championships in 1923 and the indoor doubles championship, with Ingvar Garell, in 1927. He also won the Swedish National Outdoor doubles championship, in partnership with Charles Wennergren, in 1916.

Söderström was a member of the Swedish Davis Cup team who played against Yugoslavia during the 1930 Davis Cup competition. The match was played on clay courts at the Beograd Tennis Klub in Belgrade, Yugoslavia and Söderström lost his singles matches, against Franjo Šefer and Krešimir Friedrich, in four sets and straight sets respectively, as well as his doubles match partnering Harry Ramberg.

== See also ==
- List of Sweden Davis Cup team representatives
