= Volmar =

Volmar is a given name and a surname of Germanic origin, and may refer to:

- Volmar (monk), 12th century monk
- King Volmar, a dwarf king from German mythology
- Doug Volmar (born 1945), American ice hockey player
- Isaak Volmar, Baron, lawyer, aide in the Holy Roman Empire delegation at Münster which negotiated the 1648 Peace of Westphalia
- Joseph Simon Volmar, Swiss painter
- Volmar Wikström, Finnish wrestler

== See also ==
- Vollmar
- Vollmer
