= A650 =

A650 may refer to:

- Breda A650, a type of subway car
- A650 road (Great Britain)
- Belle Poule (A 650), a French naval schooner
- Bundesautobahn 650, a German federal motorway
