= Juan Weiss =

Cuban tennis player

- Country (sports): Cuba
- Born: Sancti Spíritus, Cuba
- Died: 29 October 2001 (aged 80)

Singles

Grand Slam singles results
- US Open: 3R (1948)
Medal record
Central American and Caribbean Games
Silver medal – second place	1950 Guatemala City	Men's doubles

Juan Weiss (died 29 October 2001) was a Cuban tennis player.

Born in Sancti Spíritus, Weiss competed for Cuba in five Davis Cup ties between 1949 and 1955. He also represented his country at the 1950 Central American and Caribbean Games in Guatemala City and was a silver medalist partnering Lorenzo Nodarse in the doubles event.

Weiss, who reached the third round of the 1948 U.S. National Championships, emigrated to the United States with his family in the early 1960s to escape communism.

== See also ==
- List of Cuba Davis Cup team representatives
