= 1930 International Lawn Tennis Challenge America Zone =

The America Zone was one of the two regional zones of the 1930 International Lawn Tennis Challenge.

Four teams entered the America Zone, with the winner going on to compete in the Inter-Zonal Final against the winner of the Europe Zone. The United States defeated Mexico in the final, and went on to face Italy in the Inter-Zonal Final.

== Draw ==
Semifinals; 15–17 May
Philadelphia, PA, United States (clay)
United States | 5
Canada | 0
Cuba
Mexico | w/o

Final; 22–24 May
Chevy Chase, MD, United States (clay)
United States | 5
Mexico | 0

== Semifinals ==
=== United States vs. Canada ===
United States
5
Philadelphia Country Club, Philadelphia, PA, United States
15–17 May 1930
Clay

Canada
0

| | | | 1 | 2 | 3 | 4 | 5 |
|---|---|---|---|---|---|---|---|
| 1 | (United States) (Canada) | John Van Ryn; Jack Wright | 6; 2 | 6; 2 | 3; 6 | 6; 2 |
| 2 | (United States) (Canada) | George Lott; Marcel Rainville | 6; 2 | 6; 2 | 8; 6 |
| 3 | (United States) (Canada) | Wilmer Allison / John Van Ryn; Willard Crocker / Jack Wright | 6; 0 | 6; 4 | 6; 2 |
| 4 | (United States) (Canada) | John Doeg; Jack Wright | 6; 2 | 6; 3 | 6; 2 |
| 5 | (United States) (Canada) | Wilmer Allison; Marcel Rainville | 6; 2 | 6; 2 | 7; 5 |

== Final ==
=== United States vs. Mexico ===
United States
5
Chevy Chase Lawn Tennis Club, Chevy Chase, MD, United States
22–24 May 1930
Clay

Mexico
0

| | | | 1 | 2 | 3 | 4 | 5 |
|---|---|---|---|---|---|---|---|
| 1 | (United States) (Mexico) | Wilmer Allison; Ricardo Tapia | 6; 3 | 3; 6 | 6; 8 | 6; 2 | 7; 5 |
| 2 | (United States) (Mexico) | George Lott; Ignacio de la Borbolla | 6; 0 | 6; 0 | 6; 0 |
| 3 | (United States) (Mexico) | Wilmer Allison / John Van Ryn; Manuel Llano / Alfonso Unda | 6; 0 | 6; 1 | 6; 3 |
| 4 | (United States) (Mexico) | John Doeg; Federico Sendel | 6; 1 | 6; 0 | 6; 2 |
| 5 | (United States) (Mexico) | John Van Ryn; Ricardo Tapia | 6; 2 | 6; 3 | 6; 1 |
