= Ellerstadt =

- Municipality
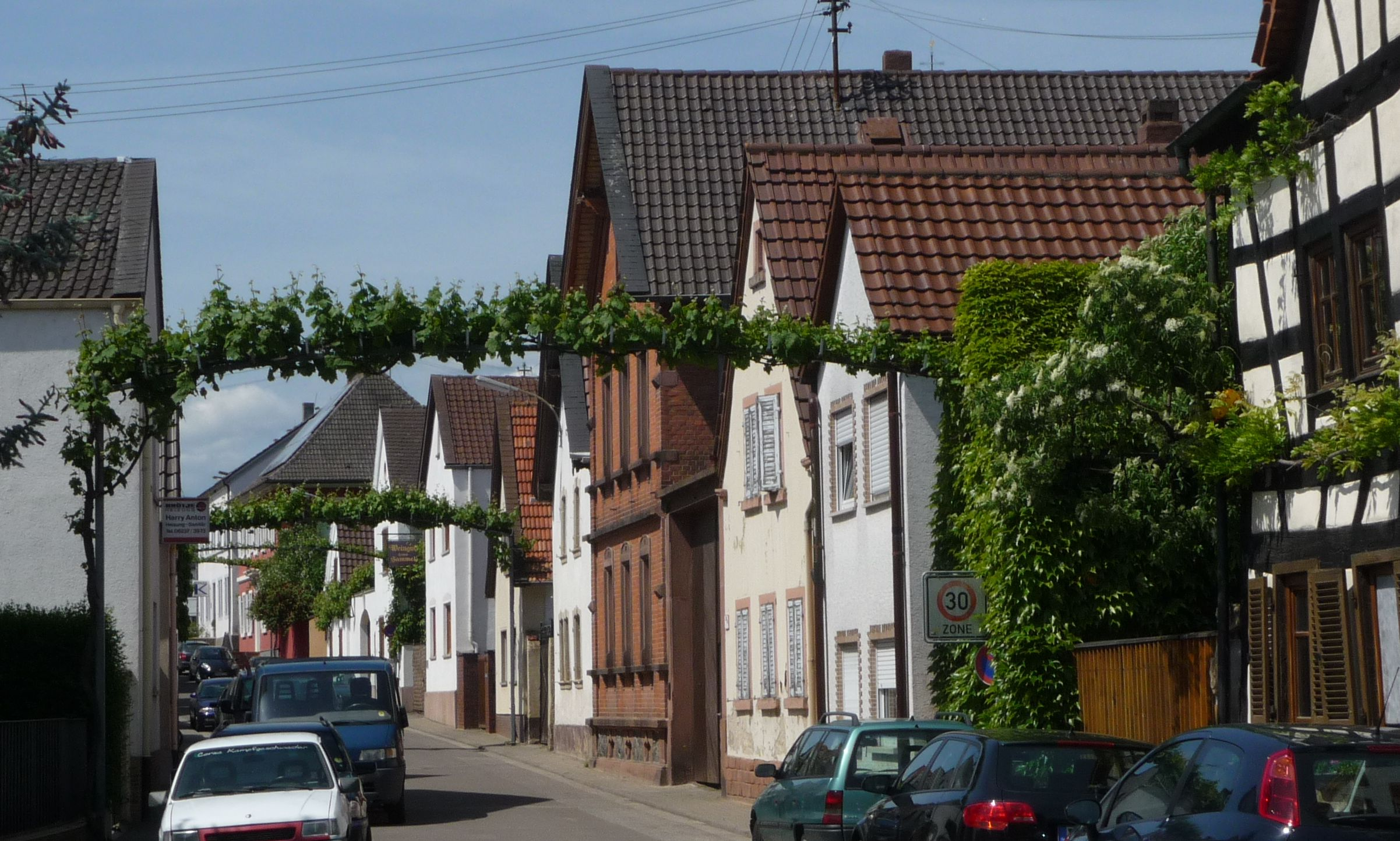

- Coat of arms

- Location of Ellerstadt within Bad Dürkheim district
- Interactive map of Ellerstadt
- Location within Germany Location within Rhineland-Palatinate
- Coordinates: 49°27′42″N 08°15′33″E
- Country: Germany
- State: Rhineland-Palatinate
- District: Bad Dürkheim
- Municipal assoc.: Wachenheim an der Weinstraße

Government
  - Mayor (2019–24): Elke Stachowiak (FW)

Area
  - Total: 6.34 km^{2} (2.45 sq mi)
- Elevation: 98–126 m (322–413 ft)

Population (2025-12-31)
  - Total: 2,459
  - Density: 388/km^{2} (1,000/sq mi)
- Time zone: UTC+01:00 (CET)
  - Summer (DST): UTC+02:00 (CEST)
- Postal codes: 67158
- Dialling codes: 06237
- Vehicle registration: DÜW
- Website: www.ellerstadt.de

Ellerstadt is an Ortsgemeinde – a municipality belonging to a Verbandsgemeinde, a kind of collective municipality – in the Bad Dürkheim district in Rhineland-Palatinate, Germany.

== Geography ==
=== Location ===
The municipality lies on the Upper Rhine Plain in the Rhine-Neckar urban agglomeration. It belongs to the Verbandsgemeinde of Wachenheim, whose seat is in the like-named town. The Akaziensiedlung (“Acacia Housing Estate”), which belongs to Ellerstadt, lies in the north of the main centre right at the limit shared with Birkenheide's built-up area.

=== Neighbouring municipalities ===
These are Birkenheide, Fußgönheim and Gönnheim.

== History ==
That the area was settled as early as Roman times is proved by three Roman stone coffins with glasses and urns that were found on the southern outskirts in 1822.

It is believed that by the 5th century, Ellerstadt was a Frankish settlement.

On 19 December 783, Ellerstadt had its first documentary mention: Documented is the donation of a part of the settlement of "Alaridestath" to Lorsch Abbey by the free Frank Hubertus. Further donations from Ellerstadt were mentioned in 863, 873 and 908 or 909 to Lorsch and in 985 to Weißenburg Monastery in Lower Alsace in what is now the French town of Wissembourg. For the year 1190, there is evidence through Lorsch Abbey of Comital-Palatine rights in Ellerstadt from the former Weißenburg Monastery estate's holdings and the "Vogtei". There was also still an Imperial estate, which was granted loyal followers, such as the Count of Hohenfels and the Knight of Bolanden.

Of great importance became the Lords of Flersheim, who beginning in 1482 acquired ownership of the Ellerstadt holdings. In 1548, the Flersheims owned two-thirds of the village and the Lords of Affenstein the other third. In 1570, Friedrich von Flersheim obtained from Emperor Maximilian II leave to hold yearly horse and livestock markets, always on 1 May and 19 November. These are no longer held. The Flersheims not only held control of the market (with all attendant rights) but also the blood court rights along with the court itself, thereby making them lords over the villagers’ very lives. Their Weistum of 1555, the municipality's oldest document dealing with its people's litigation and criminal cases (a Weistum – cognate with English wisdom – was a legal pronouncement issued by men learned in law in the Middle Ages and early modern times), was time and again publicly read out. After the Flersheims found themselves the only lordly fiefholders in the village after a settlement with the Affensteins in 1577, they held this status for only 78 years, dying out in 1655. In 1707, Ellerstadt belonged to Casimir Kolb von Wartenberg and was part of the Imperial county that was of an Imperially immediate nature. The impoverished Wartenbergs eventually sold their rights out in 1789 to the Counts of Sickingen.

In 1793 and 1794, French Revolutionary troops brought woe to the municipality. Houses were plundered and the inhabitants were forced to do labour. The seizure of all noble lands on the Rhine’s left bank also affected the Count of Sickingen. There were no longer any great landowners or free peasants. After Napoleon’s downfall and the Congress of Vienna, the Palatinate was incorporated into the Kingdom of Bavaria. It belonged to the Landeskommissariat of Neustadt, Court District of Frankenthal.

In 1939, the old Bezirksamt (“Regional Amt”) of Neustadt became the Neustadt district. Since administrative reform early in 1969, Ellerstadt has belonged to the Verbandsgemeinde of Wachenheim, and since the dissolution of the Neustadt district, it has belonged to the Bad Dürkheim district.

Winegrowing was playing a role in Ellerstadt as early as the 8th century, as told by the Lorsch donation document. Since 1886, it has been mainly Blauer Portugieser vines that have been planted. Gewürztraminer, which even Bismarck procured from Ellerstadt, has a mostly low yield and is only to be found in scattered spots, even though the soils in the municipality are especially well suited to it. In 1903, out of the municipality's area of 634 ha, 117 ha was given over to winegrowing, 357 to cropraising and gardening and 70 to “forests and woodlands”. Fruitgrowing played an important rôle until the last decade, with peach growing beginning in 1867. Known well beyond the region is the variety Ellerstadter Rote (“Ellerstadt Red”). Since 1925, however, more and more sour cherries have been being grown.

Whereas there might have been only a handful of people living here at the time of the first documentary mention, this had grown to 24 to 30 families by 1548, and by 1614 this had reached 60 to 70. In 1722, on the street where now runs the Rhein-Haardt railway, there was not a single house; in 1910, there were 767.

The sharp growth over the last few decades owes itself not least of all to the Rhein-Haardt railway. In the 1920s, the 1,000 mark was breached. By 1970, this had grown to a population of 1,400. In 1980, the figure had risen to 2,000, and come completion of the planned new development area, the population figure will rise to roughly 2,500.

== Politics ==
=== Municipal council ===
The council is made up of 16 council members, who were elected at the municipal election held on 7 June 2009, and the honorary mayor as chairman.

The municipal election held on 7 June 2009 yielded the following results:

	SPD	CDU	FDP	GRÜNE	FWG	Total
2009	6	3	0	1	6	16 seats
2004	7	3	1	1	4	16 seats

=== Mayor ===
The municipality's mayor (Ortsbürgermeister) is Elke Stachowiak, elected in 2019.

=== Coat of arms ===
The German blazon reads: In Silber auf grünem Grund ein bewurzelter grüner Eller- oder Erlenbaum mit stilisierten Blättern, dessen Stamm von zwei Wappenschildern beseitet wird, rechts von Blau und Silber und Rot geteilt, links in Silber ein roter Balken, begleitet oben von zwei, unten von einer roten Kugel.

The municipality's arms might in English heraldic language be described thus: Argent on a mount in base vert a rooted alder of the same, its stock flanked with two inescutcheons, the dexter tierced in fess azure, argent and gules, and the sinister argent a fess gules between three roundles of the same.

== Economy and infrastructure ==
The municipality, whose economic base is agricultural, earns its livelihood mainly through winegrowing, and in a smaller measure through fruitgrowing. Some of the population is employed at BASF in nearby Ludwigshafen.

=== Transport ===
Ellerstadt lies on the Bad Dürkheim–Ludwigshafen railway line of the Rhein-Haardtbahn, line 9 (in the VRN, formerly RHB), a narrow-gauge line that runs on one track through Ellerstadt on one of the streets. There are two halts, Ellerstadt Ost and Ellerstadt West. The municipality belongs to the Verkehrsverbund Rhein-Neckar (VRN).

Between Ellerstadt and the Akaziensiedlung (“Acacia Housing Estate”) runs the Autobahn A 650 (Bad Dürkheim–Ludwigshafen).

== Famous people ==
- Manfred Geis (b. 1949), politician
