= Wachenheim =

- Town
- Coat of arms

- Location of Wachenheim within Bad Dürkheim district
- Interactive map of Wachenheim
- Location within Germany Location within Rhineland-Palatinate
- Coordinates: 49°26′28″N 8°10′48″E
- Country: Germany
- State: Rhineland-Palatinate
- District: Bad Dürkheim
- Municipal assoc.: Wachenheim

Government
  - Mayor (2019–24): Torsten Bechtel (CDU)

Area
  - Total: 24.97 km^{2} (9.64 sq mi)
- Elevation: 141 m (463 ft)

Population (2025-12-31)
  - Total: 4,393
  - Density: 175.9/km^{2} (455.7/sq mi)
- Time zone: UTC+01:00 (CET)
  - Summer (DST): UTC+02:00 (CEST)
- Postal codes: 67157
- Dialling codes: 06322
- Vehicle registration: DÜW
- Website: www.wachenheim.de

Wachenheim an der Weinstraße (German pronunciation: [ˈvaxn̩ˌhaɪm ʔan deːɐ̯ ˈvaɪnˌʃtʁaːsə], lit. 'Wachenheim on the Wine Route'; formerly called Wachenheim an der Haardt, lit. 'Wachenheim on the Haardt') is a small town in the Bad Dürkheim district in Rhineland-Palatinate, Germany, roughly 1 km south of Bad Dürkheim and 20 km west of Ludwigshafen. It is known above all else for its various businesses in the field of winegrowing, and in particular for Sekt.

== Geography ==
=== Location ===
Wachenheim lies in the Middle Haardt at the eastern edge of the Palatinate Forest and is also the seat of the eponymous Verbandsgemeinde, to which also belong the neighbouring places of Friedelsheim, Gönnheim and Ellerstadt, themselves also characterized by winegrowing and also partly by fruitgrowing.

== History ==
=== Antiquity ===
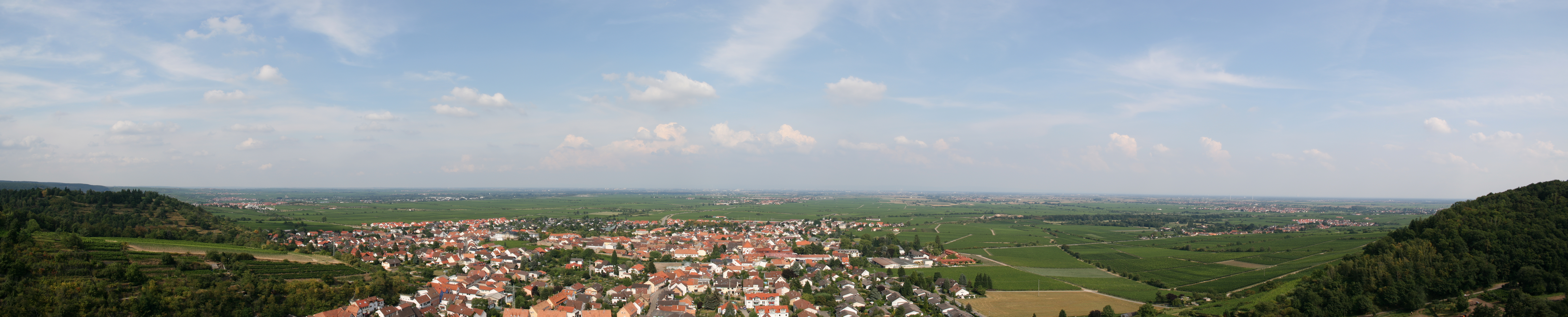
Panorama: view from the lookout tower at the Wachtenburg

The first traces of settlement in the Wachenheim area come from the early Iron Age (550 BC to 1). At this time, Celts were settling in the Upper Rhine Plain area. About 60 BC, Germanic tribes, presumably the Nemetes, pushed into the region and drove the Celts out. The Romans intervened in the disputes between the Germanic peoples and the Celts, and after their victory over Ariovistus (57 BC) subdued the Nemetes and ruled the region for the next 400 years. Under Roman influence, crop farming was improved and also fruitgrowing and winegrowing began. Supposedly running through what is now Wachenheim's municipal area was a Roman road: from Mußbach along the Haardt and through Rhenish Hesse to Bingen.

After a brief invasion by the Huns about AD 450, the Alamanni advanced into the area, although by the late 5th century, they were being driven out of the region by the Franks.

=== Middle Ages ===
Wachenheim's first documentary mention – as Wackenheim – dates from Carolingian times and is found in the Lorsch codex. There, on 30 March 766, the donation of a Wachenheim vineyard is noted.

In the 11th century, Wachenheim's lords were the Salians. The town passed on Emperor Heinrich V's death to the House of Hohenstaufen. From this time comes the castle complex, which nowadays is only ruins, but which at one time belonged to a system of castles planned and built by the Hohenstaufens.

On 24 June 1341, Wachenheim was granted town rights by Emperor Louis the Bavarian. In 1436, Emperor Ruprecht III's (1398–1410) son, Duke Stephen built a mint, which was in operation until 1471. In that year, Wachenheim, after hitherto having been under Duke Louis the Black's ownership, was taken over by Frederick I, Elector Palatine. At the time of this conquest, Wachenheim Castle was burnt down and mostly destroyed, with only partial reconstruction taking place later. The castle and town weathered the War of the Bavarian-Palatine Succession, emerging relatively unscathed. During the German Peasants' War, the castle was used by marauding peasants as a base for their raids.

=== Modern times ===
During the Thirty Years' War, Wachenheim was occupied beginning in 1621 by Spanish troops, who were driven out in 1631 by Swedish troops under King Gustav II Adolf. After the Swedes' defeat in 1634, little is known about the years that followed. There are, however, indications that the townsfolk had to flee several times to the nearby Hardenburg (castle) near Dürkheim.

Even after the Thirty Years' War, the region was time and again beset with war. One of the highlights was the Nine Years' War (known in Germany as the Pfälzischer Erbfolgekrieg, or War of the Palatine Succession, 1688–1697), in the course of which Wachenheim was completely burnt down.

In the 18th century, Wachenheim was newly built and was developing favourably when along came the turmoil of the French Revolution with its attendant hardships and destruction. In 1794, French troops invaded the village and plundered it. Thereafter, and until 1815, Wachenheim belonged to the Department of Mont-Tonnerre (or Donnersberg in German), the Arrondissement of Speyer and the Canton of Durkheim (without the umlaut) in the French Empire. After Napoleon's downfall, the Palatinate on the Rhine's left bank, and thereby Wachenheim as well, was governed by the Kingdom of Bavaria beginning in 1816. In both the Franco-Prussian War and the First World War, Wachenheim was spared further destruction and was occupied by France at the end of the latter war, until the French pulled out of the Rhineland on 1 July 1930.

Late in the Second World War, on 18 March 1945, parts of the Old Town were destroyed by several Allied air raids, as parts of the German Army Command had stopped in town.

== Politics ==
=== Town council ===
The council is made up of 20 council members, who were elected at the municipal election held on 7 June 2009, and the honorary mayor as chairman.

The municipal election held on 7 June 2009 yielded the following results:

	SPD	CDU	FDP	WGR	Total
2009	4	7	2	7	20 seats
2004	4	4	1	11	20 seats

=== Mayors ===
- Torsten Bechtel (CDU), since 21 June 2009
- Arnold Nagel (FWG), 1979–2009

=== Coat of arms ===
The town's arms might be described thus: Quarterly, first and fourth sable a lion rampant armed, langued and crowned gules, second and third bendy lozengy argent and azure, in a chief of the second, a letter W of the first.

As early as 1390, the town of Wachenheim used a seal with the quarterly composition charged with the Palatine Lion and the Bavarian "bendy lozengy" pattern (that is, slanted diamond shapes of alternating tinctures formed out of two sets of bends, or slanted stripes, each set at a different angle), although alongside this, another coat of arms, this one with the escutcheon party per pale (divided down the middle), but also showing the Palatine Lion and the Bavarian "bendy lozengy" pattern, is also known. On the dexter (armsbearer's right, viewer's left) side appears the lion already holding a W. Both coats are found alongside each other.

The current composition is first known from 1739 in a seal. The lion holding the W was adopted again in 1748 in the so-called small seal, only this time by himself.

This coat, along with the quarterly shield as the great seal, prevailed in the time that followed, and the Royal conferral acceded to Wachenheim's wish to be allowed to bear both coats, albeit with a chief added to the great arms with a black W. The chief's tincture was originally argent (silver); this has since become gules (red).

Approval for the arms came from King Ludwig I of Bavaria and was issued on 7 October 1845.

=== Town partnerships ===
Wachenheim fosters partnerships with the following places:

- Cuisery, Saône-et-Loire, France
- (Germany) Pegau, Leipzig, Saxony
- (Germany) Schwetzingen, Rhein-Neckar-Kreis, Baden-Württemberg (wine sponsorship)
- (Germany) Neuburg an der Donau, Neuburg-Schrobenhausen, Bavaria (wine sponsorship)

== Culture and sightseeing ==
=== Buildings ===
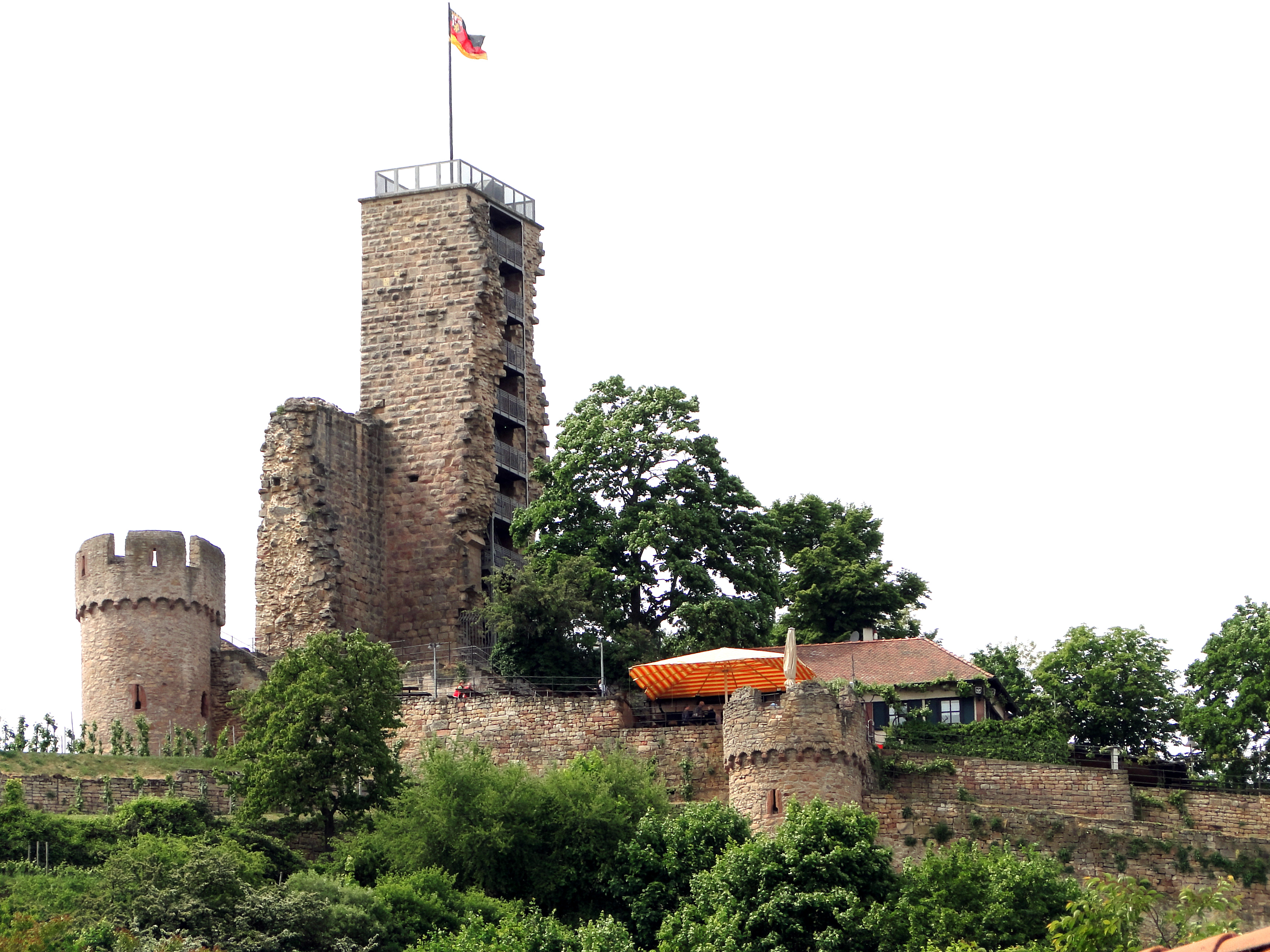
The Wachtenburg ruins, Wachenheim's landmark

- Wachtenburg – The Wachtenburg castle ruins, owing to the view over the Upper Rhine Plain is also known as the "Balcony of the Palatinate". From here, one can see the Rhine Valley, the Odenwald and, on a clear day, the Black Forest. The Wachtenburg, lying above the town, has its roots in the 12th century and was all but destroyed in the 15th century. In 1689, a half of the keep was blown up by French troops. Since 1984, the Förderkreis zur Erhaltung der Ruine Wachtenburg e. V. ("Promotional Circle for Maintaining the Wachtenburg Ruins") has been working on the care and restoration of these ruins. The castle is a popular outing destination for hikers, who can drop into the castle inn also found there.
- Villa rustica – The villa rustica is a Roman country seat unearthed in the 1970s during the Flurbereinigung. The foundation walls were reconstructed and convey an impression of the size of the complex that once existed.
- Villa Wolf – The Villa Wolf is a country villa from the mid-19th century. It was completed in 1843 to plans by Karlsruhe architect Friedrich Eisenlohr. An extensive estate complex and a garden with impressive tree growth round out the whole of the estate.
- Saint George's Church – St. Georgs Kirche was used, until the new Catholic church was built in 1989, by both Catholics and Protestants as a simultaneous church. The sharing came about in the course of the Electorate of the Palatinate church division in 1707. The Catholics got the quire and an outbuilding, and the Protestants got the nave.
- Town Wall – Soon after town rights were granted in 1341, Wachenheim was fortified with a town wall. The roughly 1 200 m-long wall encloses the historical town centre and is shaped like a clothes iron. The town wall was about 9 m high and at the foot 1.5 m thick. In the north and the south stood town gates. Today, the town wall's course is still easy to make out and in places outside the town centre can also be viewed. In the town centre itself, however, the town wall has been widely incorporated into other structures and only parts can be directly seen.
- Schloss Wachenheim – The Schloss houses the Sekt cellar named after it, the Sektkellerei Schloss Wachenheim. The Schloss is located at Kommerzienrat-Wagner-Straße 1 and represents an extensive winemaking estate in a landscaped park. It was built in 1730, although later buildings were built about 100 years after this, and some even as late as the 20th century.

=== Parks ===
- Kurpfalz-Park

The Kurpfalz-Park ("Electoral Palatinate Park"), lying in the Palatinate Forest on the Rotsteig, houses many kinds of animals, some of which are displayed in game reserves. Besides this there is the only summertime toboggan run in the Palatinate, along with other sources of entertainment, among which are a bird of prey show, a Kasperle theatre, a Kurpfalz-Express and many others.

=== Jewish graveyard ===
The Jewish graveyard on Römerweg is the oldest one in the region and a cultural monument.

== Economy and infrastructure ==
=== Winegrowing ===
The town is characterized by winegrowing and tourism. By land area, it is one of the Palatinate's biggest winegrowing centres. In June, the town's biggest event is held, the Burg- und Weinfest (“Castle and Wine Festival”).

=== Established businesses ===
- Dr. Bürklin-Wolf winery
- Sektkellerei Schloss Wachenheim
- Die Zunft Aktiengesellschaft

One peculiarity is the candle manufacturer Eyrich, which has been running since 1966. It is the only company in this business in the Palatinate.

=== Transport ===
Through Wachenheim runs the German Wine Route, which used to be the same road as Bundesstraße 271. To relieve the traffic load, a bypass road was built in the 1990s that runs east of Wachenheim, linking Bad Dürkheim with Neustadt an der Weinstraße.

The town also has a halt on the single-tracked Pfälzische Nordbahn (Neustadt–Monsheim), at which Regionalbahn trains stop according to Rhineland-Palatinate timetabling.

== Famous people ==
=== Sons and daughters of the town ===
- Isaac Rice (1850–1915), entrepreneur and chess playermusical director in Speyer
- Hans Hüttig (1894–1980), Nazi SS concentration camp commandant
- Godfrey Morse (1846–1911), German-American lawyer
- Heiko Vogel (born 1975), German football manager
