= Hardenstein Castle =

Coordinates: 51°25′16″N 7°18′04″E

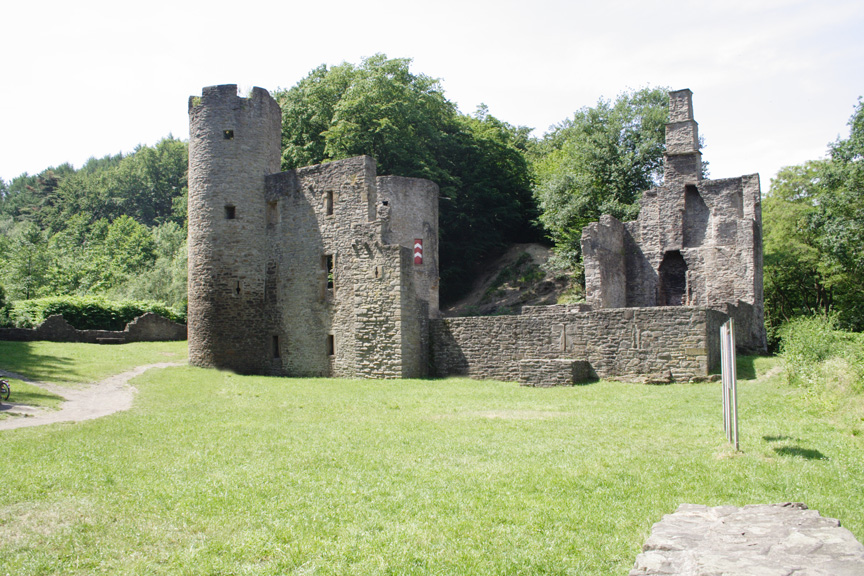
Hardenstein in 2006

Hardenstein Castle (German: Burg Hardenstein) is a ruined castle in North Rhine-Westphalia, Germany. The remains lie east of Herbede on the Ruhr River, surrounded by mountains, and are not easily accessible. Nearby ruins show that the castle was once part of an important mining centre, probably dating to the Middle Ages; the earliest records, from the 16th century, support this. The castle features in the legend of the Nibelungs.

The castle's association with mining led to a legend that King Goldemar, a dwarf or kobold, dwelled there. One version of the story, recorded by Thomas Keightley in 1850, says that King Goldemar lived with Neveling von Hardenberg at the castle. For three years, he brought the inhabitants good luck until a curious man tried to see his footprints by casting tares and ashes about. Goldemar cut the man up, roasted his body, boiled his head and legs, and ate him. He was gone the next day, vowing through a note that the house would be as unlucky as it had been lucky while he lived there.
