= Wachenheim (Verbandsgemeinde) =

Municipality in Rhineland-Palatinate, Germany

- Verbandsgemeinde
- Location of Wachenheim within Bad Dürkheim district
- Interactive map of Wachenheim
- Location within Germany Location within Rhineland-Palatinate
- Coordinates: 49°26′N 8°11′E
- Country: Germany
- State: Rhineland-Palatinate
- District: Bad Dürkheim
- Seat: Wachenheim
- Subdivisions: 4 municipalities

Area
  - Total: 42.01 km^{2} (16.22 sq mi)

Population (2025-12-31)
  - Total: 9,882
  - Density: 235.2/km^{2} (609.2/sq mi)
- Time zone: UTC+01:00 (CET)
  - Summer (DST): UTC+02:00 (CEST)
- Website: www.vg-wachenheim.de

Wachenheim is a Verbandsgemeinde ("collective municipality") in the district of Bad Dürkheim, Rhineland-Palatinate, Germany. The seat of the Verbandsgemeinde is in Wachenheim.

The Verbandsgemeinde Wachenheim consists of the following Ortsgemeinden ("local municipalities"):

1. Ellerstadt
2. Friedelsheim
3. Gönnheim
4. Wachenheim
