= Heinrich Vollmer (winery) =

Winery in Germany

Coordinates: 49°27′31″N 8°15′04″E

Weingut Heinrich Vollmer

Weingut Heinrich Vollmer is a German winery situated in Ellerstadt/Palatinate.

== History ==
Heinrich Vollmer, born 1948 in Durbach/Baden, was designated for the takeover of the fatherly farm, which also included some vineyards. Already at the age of eight years Heinrich Vollmer was introduced to the winegrower's craft. At the age of 15 years he took part in the exchange program of the GFY (German French youth work) and worked during four years as a trainee on the renowned vineyard Bouchard Père et Fils in Montrachet in French Burgundy. After his return in 1968 discrepancies occurred between him and his father about the future management of the estate and Heinrich Vollmer moved to the Palatinate region. In 1972, he acquired a vineyard in Ellerstadt and built up one of the biggest German privately held vineyards. In springtime 1987, Vollmer was sentenced by the district court of Neustadt/Weinstrasse to 72 days of custody or 72 daily rates of 100 Deutsche Mark and the immediate removal of his Cabernet Sauvignon vines. At that time, the cultivation of these vines was not permitted in Germany due to the contemporary law. The accusation was dropped during the second hearing. After that, Heinrich Vollmer built up the first German experimental plant originated for Cabernet Sauvignon grapes in cooperation with the land research institution of Rhineland-Palatinate. Today, the Cabernet Sauvignon vines that have been removed in 1987, are growing at Bodega Enrique Vollmer, the Argentine vineyard of Heinrich Vollmer in the Uco valley southwest of Mendoza, Argentina.

In the wine cellar of the winery, about 450,000 litres of white wines as well as 450,000 litres of red wines are produced annually. Private wine connoisseurs count to the established clientele of Heinrich Vollmer as well as wine traders, restaurants, retail shops (Rewe, Tengelmann, Edeka) and airlines (German Lufthansa, Condor). Since 1987 Heinrich Vollmer also owns and operates a vineyard in Argentina, Bodega Enrique Vollmer.

== Wines/Grapes ==
On account of his French winegrower's education, French grape varieties belong to Heinrich Vollmer's specialities, among them Cabernet Sauvignon, Saint Laurent, Pinot blanc, Pinot gris, Pinot noir, Sauvignon blanc, Chardonnay and Auxerrois. But also the traditional German sorts of Riesling, Dornfelder and Portugieser grapes are cultivated. The vineyard traditionally focuses on selective vintage and careful processing of the grapes. The production of the white wines takes place in modern high-grade steel tanks, while the red wines are fermented traditionally on the must and further developed in wooden barrels. The "great wines" mature up to 18 months in Barrique barrels in the cellar of the Ellerstadt estate. The winery Heinrich Vollmer cultivates currently 104 hectares of vineyards all around Ellerstadt/Palatinate in the sites of Dürkheimer Feuerberg, Deidesheimer Hofstück, Ellerstadter Bubeneck and Ellerstadter Kirchenstück. These are partly in the possession of the wine-growing estate and are leased to the other part by a specially founded producer's community.

== Awards ==
Since foundation of the wine-growing estate Heinrich Vollmer, numerous awards were acquired, just recently a gold medal for the 2009th ALTUM Cabernet Sauvignon dry Barrique and for the 2010th Pinot Gris dry.
