= 1929 International Lawn Tennis Challenge =

1929 edition of the International Lawn Tennis Challenge

Details
- Duration: 29 March – 28 July 1929
- Edition: 24th
- Teams: 29

Champion
- Winning nation: France

The 1929 International Lawn Tennis Challenge was the 24th edition of what is now known as the Davis Cup. 24 teams would enter the Europe Zone, while five would enter the America Zone. Egypt and Monaco participated for the first time.

The United States defeated Germany in the Inter-Zonal play-off, but would lose to France in the challenge round, giving France their third straight title. The final was played 26–28 July at Stade Roland Garros in Paris.

== America Zone ==
=== Draw ===
Quarterfinals; 16–18 May
Montreal, Canada (grass)
United States | 5
Canada | 0
Japan
bye
bye
Cuba
bye
Mexico

Semifinals; 17–25 May
Chevy Chase, MD, United States (clay)
United States | 4
Japan | 1
Havana, Cuba (clay)
Cuba | 4
Mexico | 1

Final; 30 May–1 June
Detroit, MI, United States (clay)
United States | 5
Cuba | 0

=== Final ===
United States vs. Cuba

United States
5
Detroit Tennis Club, Detroit, Michigan
30 May–1 June 1929
Clay

Cuba
0

| | | | 1 | 2 | 3 | 4 | 5 |
|---|---|---|---|---|---|---|---|
| 1 | (United States) (Cuba) | John Hennessey; Ricardo Morales | 6; 0 | 6; 3 | 6; 4 |
| 2 | (United States) (Cuba) | John Van Ryn; Gustavo Vollmer | 6; 0 | 6; 1 | 6; 1 |
| 3 | (United States) (Cuba) | Wilmer Allison / John Van Ryn; Ricardo Morales / Germán Upmann | 6; 2 | 6; 0 | 6; 1 |
| 4 | (United States) (Cuba) | Wilmer Allison; Gustavo Vollmer | 6; 3 | 6; 2 | 6; 5 |
| 5 | (United States) (Cuba) | George Lott; Germán Upmann | 6; 4 | 6; 3 | 6; 3 |

== Europe Zone ==
=== Draw ===
First round 29 March–12 May
Italy
bye
Ireland
bye
Spain
bye
Germany
bye
Denmark | 4
Chile | 1
Greece | 4
Yugoslavia | 1
Belgium | 4
Romania | 1
Austria | 2
Czechoslovakia | 3
Hungary | 4
Norway | 1
Monaco | 3
Switzerland | 2
Finland | 1
Egypt | 4
Netherlands | w/o
Portugal
bye
Sweden
bye
South Africa
bye
Poland
bye
Great Britain

Second round 10–19 May
Dublin, Ireland (grass)
Italy | 5
Ireland | 0
Barcelona, Spain (clay)
Spain | 1
Germany | 4
Copenhagen, Denmark
Denmark | 4
Greece | 1
Prague, Czechoslovakia
Belgium | 0
Czechoslovakia | 3
Budapest, Hungary
Hungary | 3
Monaco | 2
The Hague, Netherlands (clay)
Egypt | 1
Netherlands | 4
Saltsjöbaden, Sweden (clay)
Sweden | 0
South Africa | 5
Warsaw, Poland (clay)
Poland | 0
Great Britain | 5

Quarterfinals; 5–9 June
Hamburg, Germany
Italy | 2
Germany | 3
Copenhagen, Denmark
Denmark | 1
Czechoslovakia | 4
Budapest, Hungary
Hungary | 3
Netherlands | 2
Bournemouth, England (grass)
South Africa | 0
Great Britain | 5

Semifinals; 14–21 June
Prague, Czechoslovakia
Germany | 4
Czechoslovakia | 1
Budapest, Hungary (clay)
Hungary | 2
Great Britain | 3

Final; 12–14 July
Berlin, Germany (clay)
Germany | 3
Great Britain | 2

=== Final ===
Germany vs. Great Britain

Germany
3
Rot-Weiss Tennis Club, Berlin, Germany
12–14 July 1929
Clay

Great Britain
2

| | | | 1 | 2 | 3 | 4 | 5 |
|---|---|---|---|---|---|---|---|---|
| 1 | (Germany) (United Kingdom) | Daniel Prenn; Colin Gregory | 6; 3 | 6; 3 | 6; 2 |
| 2 | (Germany) (United Kingdom) | Hans Moldenhauer; Bunny Austin | 6; 4 | 6; 2 | 6; 3 |
| 3 | (Germany) (United Kingdom) | Heinrich Kleinschroth / Heinz Landmann; Ian Collins / Colin Gregory | 4; 6 | 2; 6 | 0; 6 |
| 4 | (Germany) (United Kingdom) | Hans Moldenhauer; Colin Gregory | 0; 6 | 2; 6 | 3; 6 |
| 5 | (Germany) (United Kingdom) | Daniel Prenn; Bunny Austin | 4; 6 | 6; 2 | 6; 4 | 4; 6 | 5; 1 | retired |

== Inter-zonal final ==
Germany vs. United States

Germany
0
Rot-Weiss Tennis Club, Berlin, Germany
19–21 July 1929
Clay

United States
5

| | | | 1 | 2 | 3 | 4 | 5 |
|---|---|---|---|---|---|---|---|
| 1 | (Germany) (United States) | Hans Moldenhauer; Bill Tilden | 2; 6 | 4; 6 | 4; 6 |
| 2 | (Germany) (United States) | Daniel Prenn; Frank Hunter | 6; 3 | 3; 6 | 4; 6 | 3; 6 |
| 3 | (Germany) (United States) | Hans Moldenhauer / Daniel Prenn; Wilmer Allison / John Van Ryn | 11; 9 | 2; 6 | 4; 6 | 3; 6 |
| 4 | (Germany) (United States) | Daniel Prenn; Bill Tilden | 1; 6 | 4; 6 | 1; 6 |
| 5 | (Germany) (United States) | Hans Moldenhauer; Frank Hunter | 3; 6 | 6; 1 | 4; 6 | 6; 4 | 1; 6 |

== Challenge round ==
France vs. United States

France
3
Stade Roland Garros, Paris, France
26–28 July 1929
Clay

United States
2

| | | | 1 | 2 | 3 | 4 | 5 |
|---|---|---|---|---|---|---|---|
| 1 | (France) (United States) | Henri Cochet; Bill Tilden | 6; 3 | 6; 1 | 6; 2 |
| 2 | (France) (United States) | Jean Borotra; George Lott | 6; 1 | 3; 6 | 6; 4 | 7; 5 |
| 3 | (France) (United States) | Jean Borotra / Henri Cochet; Wilmer Allison / John Van Ryn | 1; 6 | 6; 8 | 4; 6 |
| 4 | (France) (United States) | Jean Borotra; Bill Tilden | 6; 4 | 1; 6 | 4; 6 | 5; 7 |
| 5 | (France) (United States) | Henri Cochet; George Lott | 6; 1 | 3; 6 | 6; 0 | 6; 3 |

== See also ==
- 1929 Wightman Cup
