= Friedelsheim =

- Municipality
- Coat of arms

- Location of Friedelsheim within Bad Dürkheim district
- Interactive map of Friedelsheim
- Location within Germany Location within Rhineland-Palatinate
- Coordinates: 49°26′48″N 08°13′23″E
- Country: Germany
- State: Rhineland-Palatinate
- District: Bad Dürkheim
- Municipal assoc.: Wachenheim an der Weinstraße

Government
  - Mayor (2019–24): Peter Fleischer

Area
  - Total: 4.16 km^{2} (1.61 sq mi)
- Elevation: 117 m (384 ft)

Population (2025-12-31)
  - Total: 1,429
  - Density: 344/km^{2} (890/sq mi)
- Time zone: UTC+01:00 (CET)
  - Summer (DST): UTC+02:00 (CEST)
- Postal codes: 67159
- Dialling codes: 06322
- Vehicle registration: DÜW
- Website: www.friedelsheim.de

Friedelsheim is an Ortsgemeinde – a municipality belonging to a Verbandsgemeinde, a kind of collective municipality – in the Bad Dürkheim district in Rhineland-Palatinate, Germany.

== Geography ==
=== Location ===
The winegrowing centre lies in the eastern Palatinate (Vorderpfalz). It belongs to the Verbandsgemeinde of Wachenheim, whose seat is in the like-named town.

== History ==
The Lorscher Codex contains the first known documentary mention of Friedelsheim. The mention outlines a June 24 770 donation made by Wacko to the Monastery of Saint Nazarius in Lorsch, Germany.

== Politics ==
=== Municipal council ===
The council is made up of 16 council members, who were elected at the municipal election held on 7 June 2009, and the honorary mayor as chairman.

The municipal election held on 7 June 2009 yielded the following results:

	SPD	CDU	FDP	FWG	Total
2009	4	5	1	6	16 seats
2004	4	4	3	5	16 seats

=== Coat of arms ===
The German blazon reads: Eine vor blauem Hintergrund abgebildete silberne Burg mit offenem Tor und drei Türmen mit spitzen roten Dächern, gekrönt von je einer goldenen Wetterfahne.

The municipality's arms might in English heraldic language be described thus: Azure a castle argent with an open gate and three towers each with a pointed roof gules crowned by a weathervane Or.

The arms are based on an old municipal seal, first known to have been used in 1698. The arms were officially conferred on 17 September 1853.

== Culture and sightseeing ==
=== Regular events ===
- On the third Sunday in August, the Friedelsheimer Weinkerwe – the wine fair – is held.
- On the second day of Advent, a Christmas market is held at the Protestant church.

== Economy and infrastructure ==
=== Transport ===
The Autobahn A 650 to Ludwigshafen links Friedelsheim to the national highway network. Towards Bad Dürkheim runs Bundesstraße 37.

The Rhein-Haardtbahn, a narrow-gauge railway running from Mannheim to Bad Dürkheim, also affords a link to the rail network.

== Famous people ==
=== Sons and daughters of the town ===
- Christian Philipp Koester (1784–1851), painter and restorer
- Jakob Latscha (1849–1912), businessman
- Ethelbert Stauffer (1902–1979), theologian
