= List of Cuba Davis Cup team representatives =

This is a list of tennis players who have represented the Cuba Davis Cup team in an official Davis Cup match. Cuba have taken part in the competition since 1924.

== Players ==
Player	W-L (Total)	W-L (Singles)	W-L (Doubles)	Ties	Debut
José Agüero	2 – 15	2 – 9	0 – 6	8	1935
Ernesto Alfonso	3 – 1	0 – 0	3 – 1	4	2014
Vicente Banet	4 – 10	4 – 8	0 – 2	7	1924
Randy Blanco	9 – 6	6 – 2	3 – 4	8	2013
Jorge Catala	1 – 2	1 – 2	0 – 0	3	1998
Raul Chacon	1 – 3	0 – 0	1 – 3	4	1925
Ricardo Chile	18 – 11	12 – 10	6 – 1	17	2000
Jose-Antonio Cobas-Martinez	2 – 1	1 – 1	1 – 0	3	2001
Jorge Córdova	0 – 1	0 – 1	0 – 0	1	1997
Roberto Cruz Ramos	1 – 3	0 – 0	1 – 3	4	2013
Luis-Javier Cuellar-Contreras	0 – 3	0 – 1	0 – 2	2	2007
Antonio Daly	0 – 1	0 – 1	0 – 0	1	1948
William Dorantes Sanchez	9 – 11	9 – 11	0 – 0	20	2009
Yasier Estrada	3 – 4	1 – 1	2 – 3	9	2015
Joffre Etcheverry	0 – 3	0 – 3	0 – 0	3	1935
Favel-Antonio Freyre-Perdomo	5 – 4	0 – 3	5 – 1	8	2004
Orlando Garrido	5 – 16	4 – 12	1 – 4	9	1950
Reynaldo Garrido	5 – 13	4 – 9	1 – 4	8	1951
Eddy Gonzalez-Gonzalez	1 – 2	1 – 2	0 – 0	3	2003
Wilfredo Henry-Torriente	0 – 2	0 – 1	0 – 1	2	1987
Omar Hernandez Moreno	7 – 10	5 – 7	2 – 3	13	2014
Edgar Hernandez-Perez	9 – 9	8 – 9	1 – 0	15	2004
Raul Karman	0 – 4	0 – 2	0 – 2	2	1957
Kerlin Leon-Zamora	0 – 2	0 – 2	0 – 0	2	2000
Denilson Martinez	1 – 4	0 – 0	1 – 4	6	2017
Sandor Martínez	22 – 17	4 – 9	18 – 8	29	1998
Yanquiel Medina-Sobrino	1 – 0	1 – 0	0 – 0	1	2002
Adolfo Minoso	0 – 3	0 – 2	0 – 1	1	1958
Ricardo Morales	4 – 12	2 – 7	2 – 5	7	1929
Lázaro Navarro	25 – 14	16 – 6	9 – 8	19	1995
Lorenzo Nodarse	1 – 4	0 – 3	1 – 1	4	1933
Jesus Pardo	0 – 1	0 – 1	0 – 0	1	1949
Rogelio Paris	5 – 11	4 – 7	1 – 4	6	1924
Armando Pérez	5 – 7	3 – 7	2 – 0	6	1994
Yoan Perez	4 – 0	0 – 0	4 – 0	5	2019
Juan Pino	34 – 29	21 – 17	13 – 12	26	1987
Maikol Ponte	2 – 2	2 – 2	0 – 0	4	2019
Arturo Randin	1 – 2	0 – 1	1 – 1	2	1933
Osmel Rivera Granja	15 – 14	10 – 7	5 – 7	18	2016
Cristian Rodríguez	0 – 1	0 – 0	0 – 1	1	2016
David Rodriguez	1 – 0	0 – 0	1 – 0	1	2018
Tomas Rodriguez-Sanchez	1 – 0	1 – 0	0 – 0	1	1988
Guillermo Sanchez-Villalba	0 – 1	0 – 0	0 – 1	1	1924
Alexander Tabares	1 – 1	1 – 1	0 – 0	2	1994
Mario Tabares	22 – 26	15 – 17	7 – 9	16	1987
Osviel Turino	2 – 2	0 – 2	2 – 0	3	2019
Germán Upmann	0 – 3	0 – 1	0 – 2	2	1929
Gustavo Vollmer	2 – 5	2 – 4	0 – 1	3	1929
Juan Weiss	0 – 9	0 – 4	0 – 5	5	1949
Ignacio Zayas	0 – 1	0 – 1	0 – 0	1	1924
