= Vollmer =

Vollmer is a family name. Notable people with the name include:

- Adolph Friedrich Vollmer (1806–1875), German landscape and marine painter and graphic artist
- Andy Vollmer (born 1953), American lawyer and SEC General Counsel
- Antje Vollmer (1943–2023), German politician
- April Vollmer (born 1951), American artist and educator
- Asher Vollmer (born 1989), American indie video game developer
- August Vollmer (1876–1955), American police chief
- Brian Vollmer (born 1955), Canadian singer
- Clyde Vollmer (1921–2006), American baseball player
- Dana Vollmer (born 1987), American swimmer
- Edward Vollmer (1877–1939), American politician
- Erika Vollmer (1925–2021), German tennis player
- Erwin Vollmer (1884–1884), German painter and sculptor
- Friedrich Vollmer (1867–1923), German classical philologist
- Grace Vollmer (1884–1977), American painter
- Gerhard Vollmer (born 1943), German physicist and philosopher
- Günter Vollmer (1917–2004), German officer and Knight's Cross recipient
- Günther Vollmer (1902–1945), German jurist and member of the Nazi party
- Gustavo Vollmer (died 1954), Cuban tennis player
- Gustavo J. Vollmer (1923–2014), Venezuelan industrialist, philanthropist and scouting figure
- Hans Vollmer (1878–1969), German art historian and encyclopedist
- Heinrich Vollmer (1885–1961), German small-arms designer
- Henry Vollmer (1867–1930), American politician
- Herb Vollmer (1895–1961), American water polo player
- Jana Vollmer (born 1973), German beach volleyball player
- Joan Vollmer (1923–1951), American poet
- Jörg Vollmer (born 1957), German general
- Joseph Vollmer (1871–1955), German automobile and tank designer and engineer
- Judith Vollmer (born 1951), American poet and editor
- Jürgen Vollmer (born 1939), German photographer
- Lisa Vollmer (1937–2022), German social worker and politician
- Lula Vollmer (1889–1955), American writer, dramatist, playwright
- Matthew Vollmer (born 1974), American writer, editor, and academic
- Patrick M. Vollmer (born 1969), House of Lords Librarian
- Ralf Vollmer (born 1962), German footballer
- Richard W. Vollmer, Jr. (1926–2003), American judge
- Ruth Vollmer (1903–1982), German-American conceptual artist
- Sebastian Vollmer (born 1984), American football player
- Tiffany Vollmer (born 1973), American voice actress
- Tim Vollmer (born 1946), American discus thrower

== See also ==
- Peter Vollmer, fictional American neo-Nazi from the Twilight Zone episode He's Alive
- Vollmer Building, historic building in Genesee, Idaho
- Vollmer House, historic house in San Francisco, California
- Vollmer Peak, a mountain in the Berkeley Hills
- Heinrich Vollmer (winery) in Germany
- Hiram Price/Henry Vollmer House in Davenport, Iowa
- Craigmont, Idaho, city formed in 1920 after the merging of Vollmer and Ilo
- Volmer (disambiguation)
