= Germán Upmann =

Cuban tennis player (1910–1998)

- Full name: Germán Upmann Machin
- Country (sports): Cuba
- Born: 14 November 1910; Havana, Cuba
- Died: 1 September 1998 (aged 87); Havana, Cuba

Singles

Grand Slam singles results
- US Open: 2R (1929)
Medal record
Central American and Caribbean Games
Silver medal – second place	1930 Havana	Men's doubles

Germán Upmann Machin (14 November 1910 — 1 September 1998) was a Cuban tennis player.

Upmann, who was born in Havana, is a descendant of German banker Hermann Dietrich Upmann, best known for creating the H. Upmann brand of cigars.

In 1929 he featured in two Davis Cup ties for Cuba, the first against Mexico at home in Havana and the second away in Detroit against the United States. He also competed in the main draw of the U.S. National Championships that year and fell in the second round to Jack Mooney.

At the 1930 Central American and Caribbean Games, Upmann won a silver medal for Cuba, partnering Gustavo Vollmer in the men's doubles event.

== See also ==
- List of Cuba Davis Cup team representatives
