= Gönnheim =

- Municipality
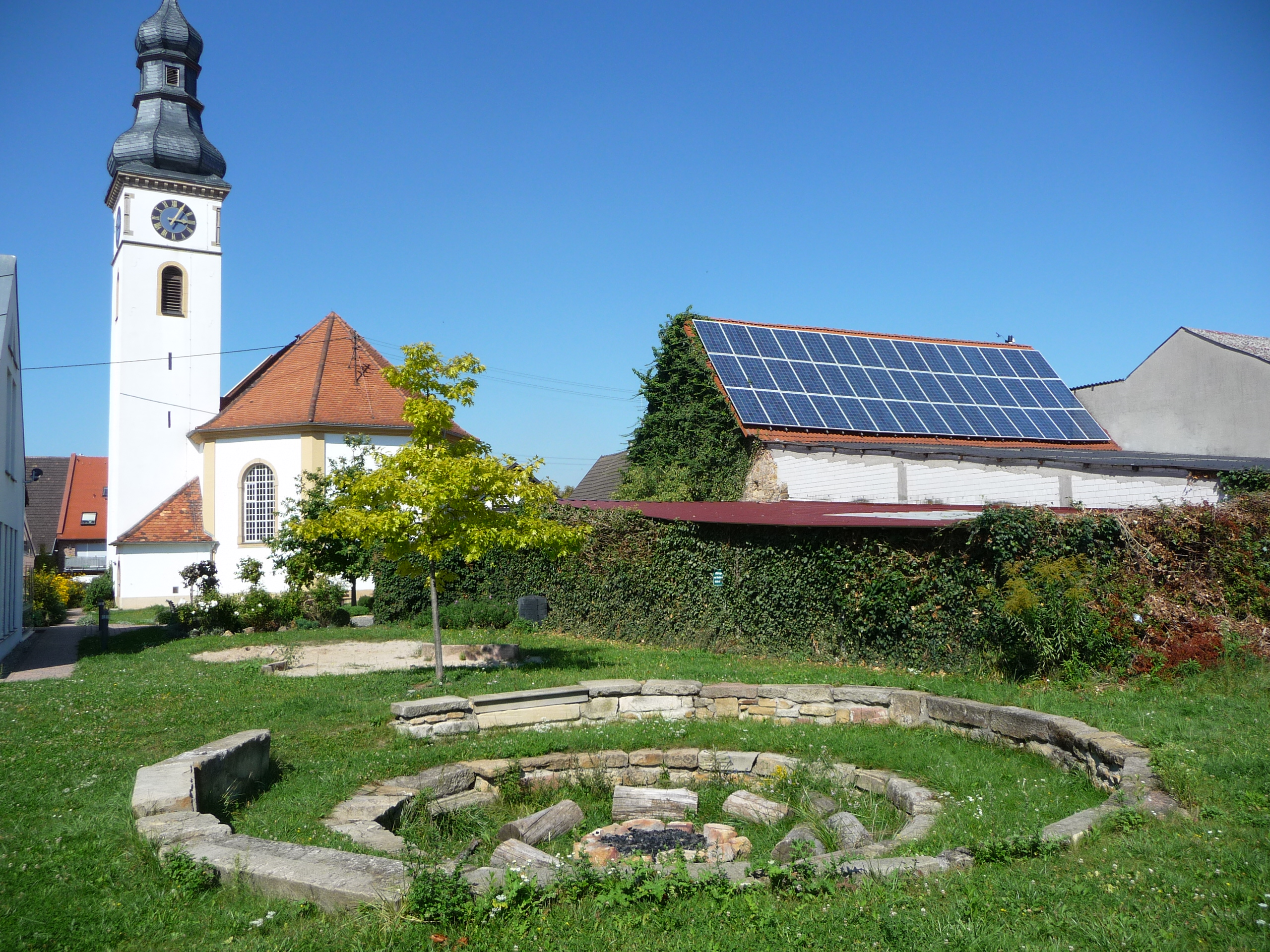
- Protestant church

- Coat of arms

- Location of Gönnheim within Bad Dürkheim district
- Interactive map of Gönnheim
- Location within Germany Location within Rhineland-Palatinate
- Coordinates: 49°26′53″N 08°14′18″E
- Country: Germany
- State: Rhineland-Palatinate
- District: Bad Dürkheim
- Municipal assoc.: Wachenheim an der Weinstraße

Government
  - Mayor (2019–24): Wolfram Meinhardt

Area
  - Total: 6.54 km^{2} (2.53 sq mi)
- Elevation: 109 m (358 ft)

Population (2025-12-31)
  - Total: 1,601
  - Density: 245/km^{2} (634/sq mi)
- Time zone: UTC+01:00 (CET)
  - Summer (DST): UTC+02:00 (CEST)
- Postal codes: 67161
- Dialling codes: 06322
- Vehicle registration: DÜW
- Website: www.goennheim.de

Gönnheim is an Ortsgemeinde – a municipality belonging to a Verbandsgemeinde, a kind of collective municipality – in the Bad Dürkheim district in Rhineland-Palatinate, Germany.

== Geography ==
=== Location ===
The winegrowing centre lies between the Haardt range and the Rhine. It belongs to the Verbandsgemeinde of Wachenheim, whose seat is in the like-named town.

== History ==
In 771, Gönnheim had its first documentary mention as Ginningheim.

=== Population development ===
Gönnheim's population rose from 124 in 1521 to 184 in 1592.

== Politics ==
=== Municipal council ===
The council is made up of 16 council members, who were elected by proportional representation at the municipal election held on 7 June 2009, and the honorary mayor as chairman.

The municipal election held on 7 June 2009 yielded the following results:

	SPD	CDU	FWG	GöLi	Total
2009	5	2	6	3	16 seats
2004	5	3	5	3	16 seats

=== Coat of arms ===
The German blazon reads: In Silber auf grünem Boden der heilige Martin in blauem Harnisch auf einem nach links schreitenden goldbezäumten und -behuftem Schimmel reitend, seinen roten Mantel durch ein silbernes Schwert mit einem am Boden sitzenden Bettler mit goldenem Lendenschurz teilend.

The municipality's arms might in English heraldic language be described thus: Argent on ground vert Saint Martin proper armoured azure mounted on a steed passant sinister of the field bridled and unguled Or, in his dexter hand a sword of the first bendwise sinister cutting his cloak gules, on the ground a beggar proper wearing a loincloth of the fourth sitting sinister and arms reaching up.

On 15 May 1845, King Ludwig I of Bavaria officially approved the arms.

=== Town partnerships ===
Gönnheim fosters a partnership with the following place:

- (Germany) Marktl am Inn, Altötting, Bavaria

== Culture and sightseeing ==
=== Regular events ===
Every year on the first weekend in July, the Gönnheimer Weintage (“Gönnheim Wine Days”) are held, and on the last weekend in August is the church consecration festival, locally known as the Martinskerwe (“Martin’s kermis”).

== Economy and infrastructure ==
=== Transport ===
The Rhein-Haardtbahn, a narrow-gauge railway running from Mannheim to Bad Dürkheim, links Gönnheim to the rail network.
