= Priit Volmer =

Estonian opera singer (born 1978)

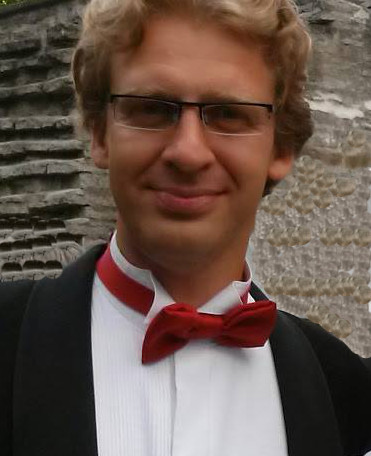
Priit Volmer

Priit Volmer (born 6 September 1978) is an Estonian opera singer (bass).

Volmer was born in Tartu. His father was singer and actor Peeter Volmer. In 2000, he graduated from Estonian Academy of Music and Theatre in singing speciality.

1998–2000, he was an opera chorus artist in Vanemuine Theatre, and 2000–2004 in Estonian National Opera. 2004–2013, he was a soloist in Estonian National Opera. Since 2016, he is working again in Estonian National Opera.

Awards:

- 2005: Theatre Prize of Harjumaa
- 2008: Marje and Kuldar Sink Prize for Young Singer
- 2008 and 2017: Colleague Prize of Estonian National Opera
- 2013 and 2017: Estonian National Opera SEB Audience Award
- 2013: Estonian Theatre annual award

== Opera roles ==
- Mityukha (Modest Mussorgsky's Boris Godunov)
- Third Tramp (Carl Orff's Die Kluge)
- Vagabond (Der Mond)
- Adolf Eichmann (Erkki-Sven Tüür's Wallenberg)
- Heinrich der Vogler (Richard Wagner's Lohengrin)
- Bass (To the Distant Beloved)
- Don Pasquale (Gaetano Donizetti's Don Pasquale)
- La Voce (Bass) (Mozart's Idomeneo)
- l'Arbre/La Fauteuil/Wing Chair's Shadow (Bass) (Maurice Ravel's Ma mère l′oye/L'enfant et les sortilèges (adaptation))
- Ferrando (Bass) (Giuseppe Verdi's Il trovatore)
