= Lorenzo Nodarse =

Cuban tennis player (1909–1994)

- Country (sports): Cuba
- Born: 1 April 1909; Havana, Cuba
- Died: 20 May 1994 (aged 85); Texas City, Texas, U.S.
Medal record
Central American and Caribbean Games
Silver medal – second place	1935 San Salvador	Mixed doubles
Silver medal – second place	1938 Panama City	Men's doubles
Silver medal – second place	1950 Guatemala City	Men's doubles

Lorenzo Nodarse (1 April 1909 – 20 May 1994) was a Cuban tennis player.

Born in Havana, Nodarse featured in four Davis Cup ties for Cuba during the 1930s and was a three-time silver medalist at the Central American and Caribbean Games.

Nodarse, a trained lawyer, served as a Davis Cup referee and Cuban sports commissioner in his career post-tennis. He left communist Cuba for the United States, settling in Texas City.

== See also ==
- List of Cuba Davis Cup team representatives
