= Peeter Volmer =

Estonian singer and actor

Jaan-Peeter Volmer (12 February 1940 in Tartu – 7 November 2002 in Pärnu) son of Leonid Volmer and Terese Adele Mugasto) was an Estonian singer (baritone) and actor.

From 1958 until 1962, he studied medicine at Tartu State University. From 1964 until 1968, he studied singing at Tartu Music School. From 1962 until 1977, he performed with the Vanemuine theatre's choir. From 1980 until 1999, he worked at Endla Theatre. He has also played in several films (e.g. Perekond Männard, 1960).

He was the father of the opera singer Priit Volmer. Peeter was made famous by Perekond Männard a famous Estonian film in which he played the character Ilmar Männard in 1960.

== Career ==
Peeter Volmer is an Estonian actor, director, and singer known for his versatile career in theater, film, and television. He began his acting journey in the 1980s, becoming a prominent figure in the Estonian theater scene. Volmer has performed with numerous prestigious theaters, including the Estonian Drama Theatre and Vanemuine Theatre, showcasing his talent in both classic and contemporary productions. In addition to acting, he has directed various theatrical performances, further establishing his reputation in the performing arts. Volmer has also appeared in several Estonian films and television series, gaining recognition for his distinctive roles. Alongside his acting and directing career, Volmer is an accomplished singer, having released multiple albums and performed in various musical productions throughout Estonia.

== Opera and Acting roles ==
- Miguel (Prokofiev's "Kihlus kloostris", 1962)
- Gardefeu (Offenbach's "Pariisi elu", 1964)
- Semyon (Kabalevsky's "Kevad laulab", 1964)
- The Lictor and the messenger (Shakespeare's "Coriolanus", 1964)
- Count (Strauss' "On The Beautiful Blue Danube", 1965)
- Jakob (1965)
- Count Ceprano (Verdi's "Rigoletto", 1966)
- Eerik (Undi's "This World or Another", 1966)
- Amada (Hajiyev's Cuba, "My love!", 1966)
- Laur (Vinter's "Spring", 1967)
- Pali (J. Strauss's "Gypsy Baron", 1968)
- Eerik (Salynski's "Men's Tale", 1968)
- Church Servant (Puccini's "Tosca", 1969)
- Dancairo (Bizet's "Carmen", 1970)
- Bartholomew (Tubina Barbara's Von Tisenhusen", 1971)
- Bogdanowitsch and Danilo (Lehantrri's "Un Widow", 1971)
- Timka, driver (In the backyard of "LUTs and Liives", 1974)
- The Waiter (Anouilh's "Wildcat", 1985)
- Alexander Petrovich (Tolstoy's "The Light Shines in the Darkness", 1987)
- Launola ("The Howling Miller of Paasilinn and Cross-country," 1988)
- Madis (Kitzberg's "Kaval-Ants and The Devil", 1988)
- Pivos (Kanderi's "Zorbas", 1989)
- La Ramalge (Molialgre's "Don Juan", 1990)
- Laane, a native peasant (Jakobson's "Arthur and Anna, or People of Old and New Times", 1991)
- Arno's father (Lutsu's "Spring", 1996)
- Blue Jacket (Smuuli's "Kihnu Yank", 1997)
