= Klausbernd Vollmar =

German scientific psychologist

- Born: 22 November 1946 (age 79)
- Occupation: Scientific psychologist

Klausbernd Vollmar (born 22 November 1946) is a German scientific psychologist (Diplompsychologe) specializing in the language of symbols in dreams, art and advertisements.

Vollmar was born in Remscheid, Germany. He studied German literature, linguistics, philosophy and geography at the Ruhr-University in Germany and McGill University in Montreal. After his degrees he was awarded a research scholarship by the Canada Council at McGill University. He worked as editor in chief of different papers and magazines, as director (theatre and films) and for the Goethe-Institut (the international German culture institution) in Finland.

In the 1970s he returned to university to study psychology. He was a student of the countess Olga von Ungern-Sternberg (a direct student of C. G. Jung). He undertook anthropological studies in Asia and the Arctic, about which he wrote in his novel “Wasserberg and his Arctic Diary.

Later he ran bookshops in Cologne, worked in the publication department of the Findhorn community, Scotland and was a member of an English Gurdjieff group.

Since the end of the 1980s he has lived on the Norfolk coast, writing mostly non-fiction books for international publishing houses and working for radio and television. His main subject is the language of symbols, dreams and the impact of colour on our lives. Besides that he is known as a specialist for the Arctic. He published several articles about the concept of the north and the picture of the Inuit in literature and film.

His books are translated in 15 languages. Apart from the books about creativity and personal development he wrote the German standard encyclopedia of symbols in dreams and the first German encyclopedia of colour in history, art and printing.

== Works ==
English books

- Journey through the Chakras (Gateway/Bath)
- Little Giant Encyclopedia of Dreams (Sterling/New York)
- The Secret of the Enneagrams (Element/Shaftesbury)
- The Enneagram Workbook (Sterling/New York)

Dreams and symbols

- Quickfinder Traumdeutung (zusammen mit K. Lenz, Gräfe und Unzer, München 2008) ISBN 978-3-8338-0759-6
- Traumdeutung - Der große GU-Kompass (Gräfe und Unzer Vlg., zusammen mit K. Lenz), ISBN 3-7742-5698-5,8. Auflage 2008
- Besser schlafen – besser träumen (Königsfurt Vlg.) ISBN 978-3-89875-195-7
- Das Buch der Traumdeutung (Heyne Tb.), ISBN 3-453-70051-1
- Kurs in Traumdeutung – Professionell Träume deuten Schritt für Schritt (zusammen mit K. Lenz, Königsfurt), ISBN 978-3-89875 -126-1
- Das Buch der Traumdeutung (Königsfurt Vlg.), ISBN 3-89875-110-4
- Klausbernd Vollmars Welt der Symbole - Lexikon (Königsfurt Vlg.), ISBN 978-3-89875-087-5, auch als:
- Symbole von A-Z (Moewig Vlg.), ISBN 3-8118-1028-6
- Die Weisheit der Träume - Symbolsprache verstehen, nutzen (Heyne Vlg.), ISBN 3-453-70004-X
- Das Arbeitsbuch zur Traumdeutung (Neue Erde)
- Das Arbeitsbuch zur Traumdeutung (Iris Bücher/Schors, Amsterdam), ISBN 90-76274-28-2
- Traumdeutung – Personen; Methoden und Begriffe von A-Z (Königsfurt), ISBN 978-3-89875-125-4
- Kurs in Traumdeutung – Professionell Träume deuten Schritt für Schritt (mit K. Lenz, Königsfurt),ISBN 978-3-89875-126-1
- Die Weisheit der Träume - Symbolsprache verstehen, nutzen (Heyne Vlg.), ISBN 3-453-70004-X
- Träume als Wegzeichen auf der Reise des Lebens - Eine praktische Einführung in die Welt der Traumsymbole (Iris Bücher/Schors, Amsterdam), ISBN 90-76274-57-6
- Helfende Träume - Mit Träumen Probleme lösen und Beziehungen beleben (Iris Bücher/Schors, Amsterdam) ISBN 90-76274-47-9
- Sich erfolgreich träumen - Die DreamCreativityâ-Methode (Königsfurt Vlg.), ISBN 3-933939- 07-0
- Traum und Traumdeutung erleben und verstehen (Königsfurt Vlg.), ISBN 3-933939-01-1
- Handbuch der Traumsymbole (Königsfurt Vlg.), ISBN 978-3-89875-155-1 (mit CD-Rom) – seit 2005 als erweiterte Sonderausgabe
- Handbuch der Traum-Symbole (Heyne Vlg.). ISBN 978-3-453-70065-9
- Handbuch der Traumsymbole (Klönigsfurt-Urania Vlg.), ISBN 978-3-89875-201-5
- Ratgeber Traum (Königsfurt Vlg.), ISBN 3-927808-76-8
- Wahre Träume (Königsfurt Vlg.), ISBN 3-927808-54-7
- Träume - erinnern und richtig deuten (Gräfe & Unzer Vlg.) 4 Auflagen, läuft 6/03 aus
- Traumhafte Lösungen (Iris Bücher/Königsfurt Vlg., vergriffen)
- Reise in das Land der Träume (Iris Bücher/Königsfurt Vlg., vergriffen)
- Das kleine Buch der Traumsymbole (Königsfurt Vlg., vergriffen)
- DreamPower - Handbuch für Träumer (Simon & Leutner Vlg., vergriffen)
- Gelebte Träume sind die besten Träume (Königsfurt Vlg., vergriffen)
- Handbuch der Traumsymbole, gekürzte und aktualisierte Sonderausgabe (Königsfurt Vlg., vergriffen)

Colour and creativity

- Das große Handbuch der Farben (Königsfurt), ISBN 3-89875-165-1
- Die faszinierende Welt der Farben – Ein Glossar von A – Z (ars momentum Kunstverlag) ISBN 978-3-938193-41-9
- Das kleine Buch der Farben (Königsfurt-Urania, 2008), ISBN 978-3-89875-196-4
- Das Malbuch zur Welt der Farben (Königsfurt-Urania, Sep. 2008), ISBN 978-3-86826-107-3
- Die Sprache und die Macht der Farbe (ars momentum, Witten 2007), ISBN 978-3-938193-34-1
- Das Malbuch zur Welt der Farben (Königsfurt-Urania, Sep. 2008), ISBN 978-3-86826-107-3
- Das Geheimnis der Farbe Schwarz (Fischer Media/Bern, vergriffen)
- Das Geheimnis der Farbe Weiß (Fischer Media/Bern, vergriffen)
- Farben (Gräfe & Unzer Vlg., vergriffen)
- Das Geheimnis der Farbe Rot (Bauer Vlg., vergriffen)
- Schwarz-Weiß (Goldmann Vlg., vergriffen)
- Sprungbrett zur Kreativität (Integral Vlg. hardcover & Heyne Vlg. pocket book edition) ISBN 978-3-453-70043-7
