= Hans Moldenhauer (tennis) =

German tennis player

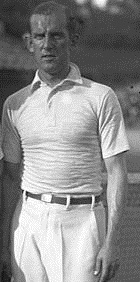
- Country (sports): Germany
- Born: 10 April 1901
- Died: 29 December 1929 (aged 28) Berlin, Germany

Grand Slam singles results
- French Open: 4R (1929)
- Wimbledon: 2R (1929)

Team competitions
- Davis Cup: F (1929)

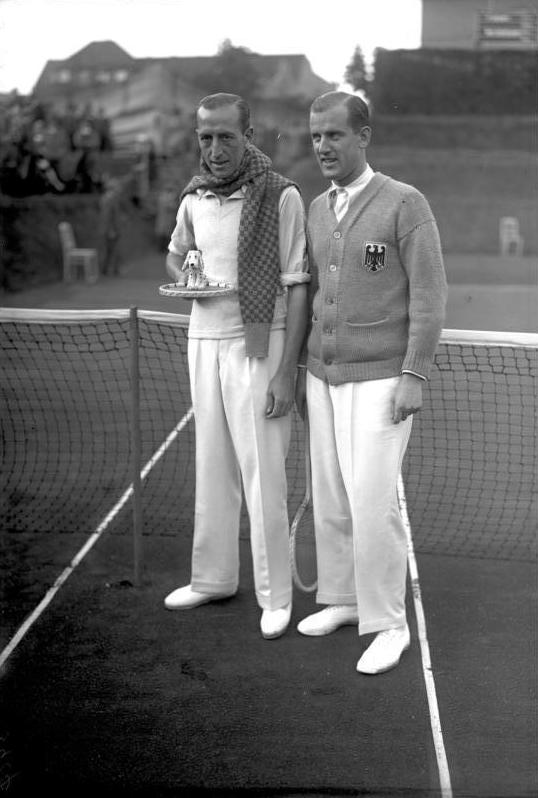
Moldenhauer (right) won in Davis Cup against E. Flaquer

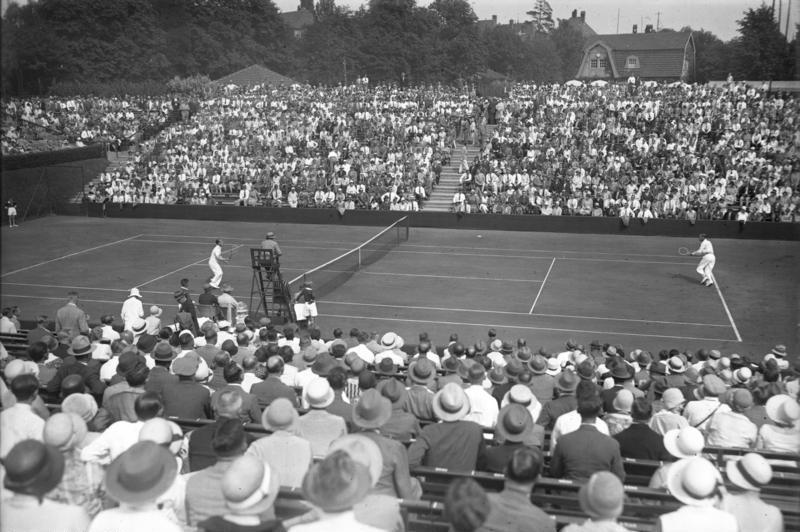
Moldenhauer (right) plays in Davis Cup against Bill Tilden (US). July 1929

Hans Moldenhauer (10 April 1901 – 29 December 1929) was Germany's first major international tennis player, competing in Wimbledon, the Davis Cup, and the French Open, and repeatedly winning the German national Championships both as a single player and in mixed doubles. He died at the age of just 28, when his motor car was hit by a tram in Berlin. He is buried at the Stahnsdorf South-Western Cemetery.

== Career ==
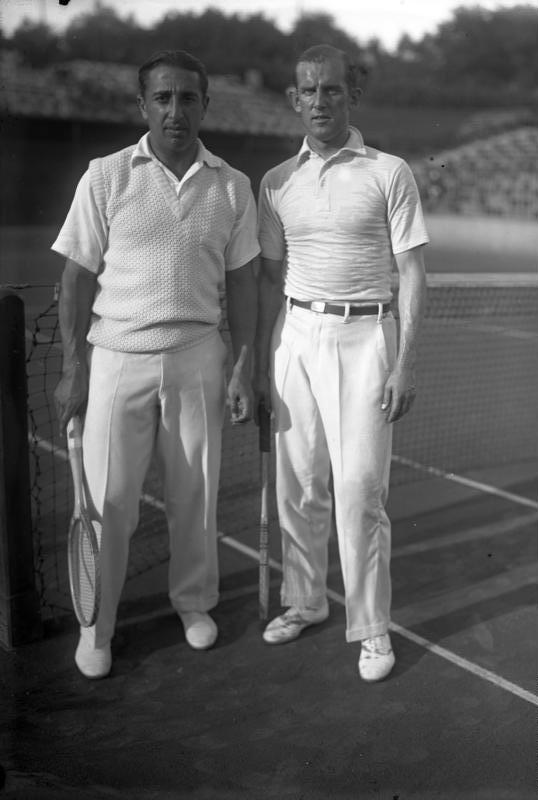
Daniel Prenn (left) and Moldenhauer

Moldenhauer won back-to-back German National Championships in 1926 and 1927, and made his third successive final in 1928 where he lost to Daniel Prenn. He also won the Danish Championship Men's Singles in 1929.

Moldenhauer played 22 times for Germany in the Davis Cup in 1927, 1928, and 1929.

In the 1929 French Championships, entering the tournament as the 16th seed, Moldenhauer was the only German to make the fourth round. His defeat in the fourth round was to the top seed, Henri Cochet.

He competed in the 1929 Wimbledon Championships and reached the second round, where he lost in five sets to fifth seed Umberto De Morpurgo, an Italian whom he had beaten just weeks earlier in an International Lawn Tennis Challenge rubber. That match also went to five sets.

The German team led by Moldenhauer would win that tie against the Italy and also defeated Czechoslovakia in Prague, where Moldenhauer won two rubbers, including the doubles, partnering Prenn. This put Germany into the 1929 European Zone final against Great Britain, which they won 3-2, with Moldenhauer winning a singles rubber over Bunny Austin. They were then whitewashed in the Inter-Zone final by the United States. Moldenhauer lost all three of his rubbers, one of which was against Bill Tilden. It was Moldenhauer's final International Lawn Tennis Challenge appearance, meaning he finished with 14 career wins, from 22 matches.

=== Mixed doubles with Cilly Aussem ===
In 1925, Moldenhauer became German Champion in mixed doubles together with his partner Cilly Aussem, and the pair competed successfully together until December 1929 when Moldenhauer was killed in a car crash. After this incident, Aussem travelled to France together with her mother to recover.

== National singles titles ==
No	Year	Tournament	Opponent	Score
1.	1926	German Championships	(Germany) Walter Dessart	6–2, 6–2, 6–1
2.	1927	German Championships	(Germany) Willy Hannemann	6–2, 4–6, 6–4, 6–4
