= Bundesautobahn 650 =

Federal motorway in Germany

A 650
- Bundesautobahn 650
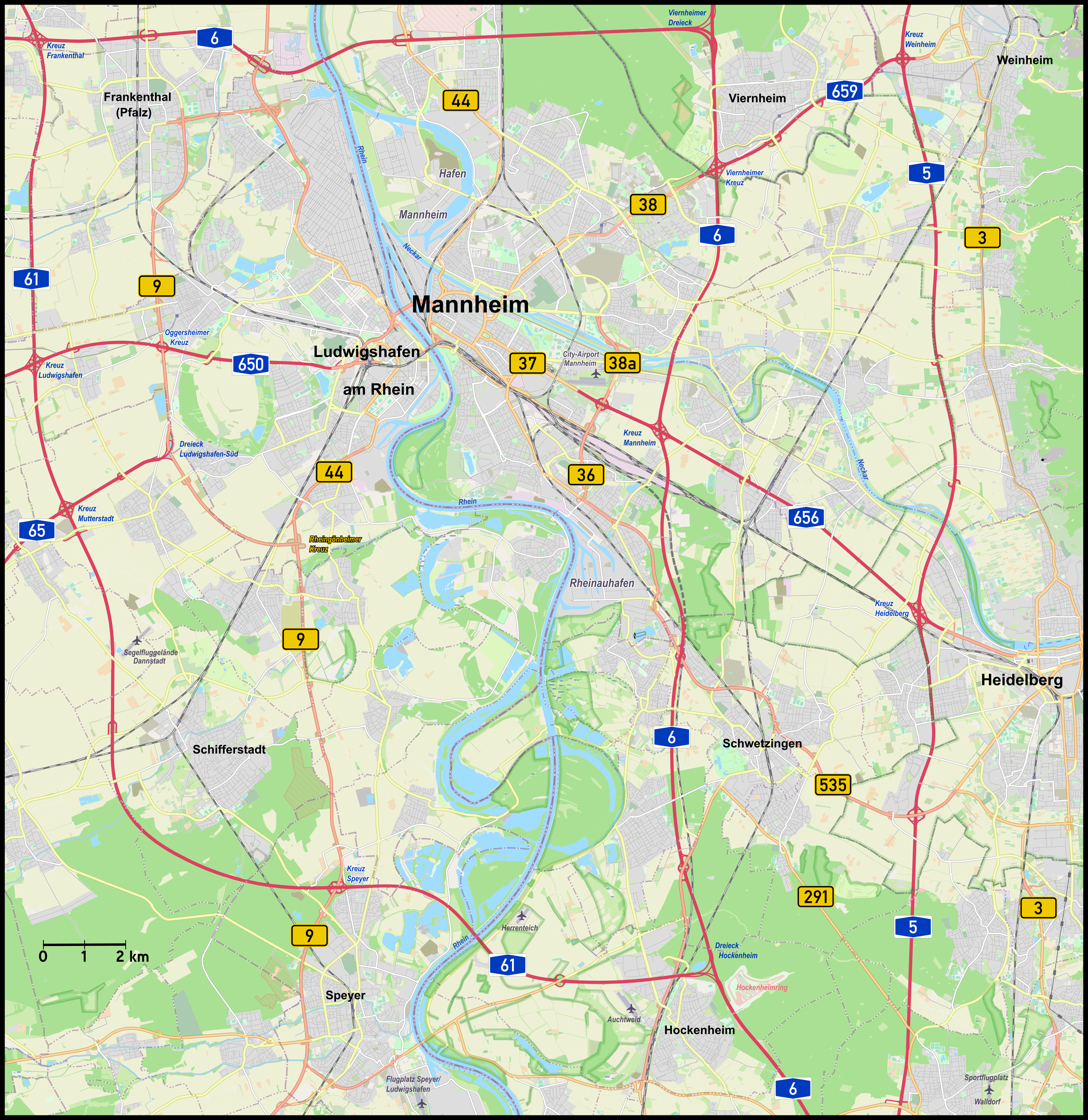
- A650

Route information
- Length: 12 km (7.5 mi)

Location
- Country: Germany
- States: Rhineland-Palatinate

Highway system
- Roads in Germany; Autobahns; List; Federal; List; State; E-roads

Bundesautobahn 650 (translates from German as Federal Motorway 650, short form Autobahn 650, abbreviated as BAB 650 or A 650) is an autobahn in Rhineland-Palatinate, Germany. It runs from Bad Dürkheim-Bruch to Ludwigshafen.

== Exit list ==
Exits are numbered from west to east.

B 37	to Kaiserslautern
1	Bad Dürkheim
2	Bad Dürkheim Süd
(3)	Friedelsheim
(4)	Maxdorf
(5)	Ludwigshafen 4-way interchange A 61
(6)	Ruchheim
(7)	Oggersheimer Kreuz B 9
(8)	Oggersheim-Süd
(9)	Ludwigshafen-Stadt
10	Ludwigshafen-Stadt
11	Ludwigshafen-Zentrum / Mitte
B 37	to Mannheim
