= King Goldemar =

Dwarf from Germanic mythology

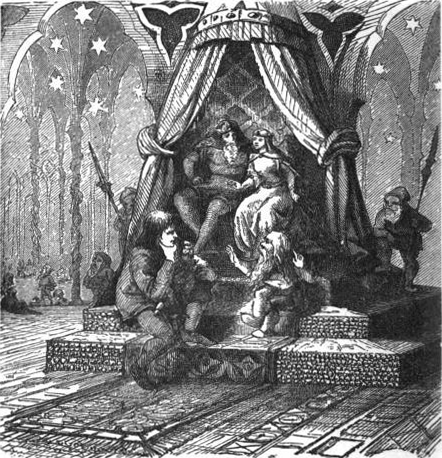
King Goldemar and his queen look on as an old dwarf tells a tale.

King Goldemar (German: [ˈɡɔldəmaːʁ]; also spelled Goldmar, Vollmar, and Volmar; German: [ˈɡɔldmaːʁ, fɔlmaːʁ]) is a dwarf or kobold from Germanic mythology and folklore. By the Middle Ages, Goldemar had become the king of the dwarfs in German belief. In one tale, he runs away with the daughter of a human king. Fragments of an epic poem by Albrecht von Kemenaten called Goldemar survive. The poem tells of Dietrich's encounter with the dwarf king. The king also features in "Der junge König und die Schäferin" ("The Prince and the Shepherdess") by German poet Ludwig Uhland. Goldemar's brothers, Alberich or Elberich and Elbegast, feature in other poems.

== Mythology ==
According to a legend recorded by Thomas Keightley in 1850, King Goldemar was a kobold, a type of house spirit in Germanic belief. Goldemar lived with Neveling von Hardenberg at Castle Hardenstein at the Ruhr River. Goldemar frequently interacted with mortals. He called Neveling his "brother-in-law" and often slept in the same bed with him. He skillfully played the harp, and he enjoyed gambling and throwing dice. He also exposed the misdeeds of the clergy. Goldemar brought good fortune to Neveling's household, demanding only a seat at the table, a stable for his horse, and food for himself and his animal. The spirit refused to be seen, but he would allow mortals to feel him; Keightley says that "[h]is hands were thin like those of a frog, cold and soft to the feel." After King Goldemar had lived with Neveling for three years, a curious person strewed ashes and tares about to try to see the kobold's footprints. Goldemar cut the man to pieces, put them on the fire to roast, and put the head and legs in a pot to boil. He then took the cooked meat to his chambers and ate it with glee. The next day, Goldemar was gone. He left a note over his door saying that the house would be as unlucky as it had been lucky while he lived there. Hardenstein lay in a rich mining area during the Middle Ages, which may account for why the castle became associated with a subterranean sprite like Goldemar.
