= Franjo Šefer =

Austrian-Yugoslavian tennis player (born 1905)

- Country (sports): Yugoslavia
- Born: 1905 Vienna, Austria-Hungary

Singles

Grand Slam singles results
- French Open: 1R (1931), (1932)
- Wimbledon: 1R (1931)

Doubles

Grand Slam doubles results
- Wimbledon: 1R (1931)

Grand Slam mixed doubles results
- Wimbledon: 1R (1931)

Franjo Šefer (Serbian: Фрањо Шефер [frǎːɲo ʃêfer]; German: Francis Schaeffer or Franz Schäffer [frants ˈʃɛfɐ]; born 1905 in Vienna) was a Yugoslav tennis player of Austrian-Jewish descent.

== Early life and family ==
Franjo Šefer was born in 1905 in Vienna to a Jewish family. They moved to Karlovac in 1910, where he made his first steps on the tennis court. Šefer was often trained with another prominent player from Karlovac, Alexander Podvineć. Šefer joined HAŠK, where Krešimir Friedrich and Nikola Antolković played.

== Tennis career ==
Franjo Šefer played for the Kingdom of Yugoslavia Davis Cup team starting in 1928. In 1933 he also became the team captain. Three times in a row he was a champion of Yugoslavia (1929, 1930, 1931). He won seven titles altogether, counting the men's and mixed doubles, and he scored a victory over Franjo Punčec at the international tournament in Bled with 6:4, 6:1.

In addition to the many years he spent at the forefront of the rankings, Šefer supplied the Yugoslav national team its first individual victory in the Davis Cup. It was in Zagreb, the second appearance of the Yugoslav National Team in the Davis Cup against Finland in 1928. Šefer's fourth Davis Cup appearance came in 1930 against Sweden in Belgrade, where he was the real hero of the match, in which he achieved the first Yugoslavian team victory in this competition. He parted ways with the national team in Budapest in the Davis Cup match against Hungary, where he sealed the 3-2 team victory, partnering Punčec and winning the doubles. In coaching, he is credited with discovering Dragutin Mitić, helping him in the early stages and introducing him to the Davis Cup team.

He set to tour India in 1934 and 1935 along with Josip Pallada, Franjo Punčec, and Franjo Kukuljević. In 1935 he won the All-India Lawn Tennis Doubles Championships with Kukuljević, after which he returned to his country to actively play until the beginning of World War II. He won one of his last titles in mixed national doubles in 1939. In the beginning of World War II he emigrated first to the United States and then to Canada, where he died. His last known whereabouts were in Montreal in 1980.

== Works cited ==
=== Primary ===
- Šoškić, Čedomir (2012). Тениски савез Србије Тенис без граници 1922–2012. [Tennis Association of Serbia, Tennis without borders 1922-2012] (PDF) (in Serbian). Belgrade, Serbia: Tennis Association of Serbia. p. 256. Archived from the original (PDF) on 30 December 2013.
- Kramer, Fredi (May–June 2012). "Franjo Schäffer – preteča teniskih mušketira" [Francis Schaffer - a precursor of tennis Musketeers] (PDF). Ha-kol (in Croatian) (125). Zagreb, Croatia: Jewish Community Zagreb: 38. Archived from the original (PDF) on 4 March 2016.

=== Secondary ===
- "All India tennis final". The Straits Times. Singapore, Straits Settlements: Straits Times Press: 14. 12 February 1935.
