= 1930 International Lawn Tennis Challenge =

1930 edition of the International Lawn Tennis Challenge

Details
- Duration: 19 April – 27 July 1930
- Edition: 25th
- Teams: 28

Champion
- Winning nation: France

The 1930 International Lawn Tennis Challenge was the 25th edition of what is now known as the Davis Cup. For the silver anniversary, 24 teams would enter the Europe Zone, while 4 would enter the America Zone.

The United States defeated Italy in the Inter-Zonal play-off, but would lose to France in the Challenge Round, giving France their fourth straight title, in the sixth straight Challenge Round matchup between these teams. The final was played 25–27 July at Stade Roland Garros in Paris.

== America Zone ==
=== Draw ===
Semifinals; 15–17 May
Philadelphia (clay)
United States	5
Canada	0
Cuba
Mexico	w/o

Final; 22–24 May
Chevy Chase, Maryland (clay)
United States	5
Mexico	0

=== Final ===
United States vs. Mexico

United States
5
Chevy Chase Lawn Tennis Club, Chevy Chase, Maryland
22–24 May 1930
Clay

Mexico
0

			1	2	3	4	5
1	(United States) (Mexico)	Wilmer Allison; Ricardo Tapia	6; 3	3; 6	6; 8	6; 2	7; 5
2	(United States) (Mexico)	George Lott; Ignacio de la Borbolla	6; 0	6; 0	6; 0
3	(United States) (Mexico)	Wilmer Allison / John Van Ryn; Manuel Llano / Alfonso Unda	6; 0	6; 1	6; 3
4	(United States) (Mexico)	John Doeg; Federico Sendel	6; 1	6; 0	6; 2
5	(United States) (Mexico)	John Van Ryn; Ricardo Tapia	6; 2	6; 3	6; 1

== Europe Zone ==
=== Draw ===
First Round; 19 April–6 May
Norway
bye
Austria
bye
Italy
bye
Egypt
bye
Great Britain	3
Germany	2
Poland	3
Romania	2
Switzerland	0
Australia	5
Ireland	4
Monaco	1
Greece	2
India	3
Hungary	0
Japan	4
Spain	4
Belgium	1
Yugoslavia	5
Sweden	0
bye
Czechoslovakia
bye
Denmark
bye
Netherlands
bye
Finland

Second Round; 9–20 May
Oslo, Norway (clay)
Norway	0
Austria	5
Rome, Italy (clay)
Italy	5
Egypt	0
Torquay, England (clay)
Great Britain	5
Poland	0
Dublin, Ireland (grass)
Australia	4
Ireland	1
London, England (clay)
India	0
Japan	5
Zagreb, Yugoslavia
Spain	5
Yugoslavia	0
Prague, Czechoslovakia
Czechoslovakia	3
Denmark	2
Amsterdam, Netherlands (clay)
Netherlands	4
Finland	1

Quarterfinals; 30 May–9 June
Vienna, Austria
Austria	2
Italy	3
Eastbourne, England (grass)
Great Britain	1
Australia	4
Barcelona, Spain (clay)
Japan	4
Spain	1
Scheveningen, Netherlands (clay)
Czechoslovakia	3
Netherlands	2

Semifinals; 14–16 June
Milan, Italy (clay)
Italy	3
Australia	2
Prague, Czechoslovakia
Japan	3
Czechoslovakia	2

Final; 11–13 July
Genoa, Italy (clay)
Italy	3
Japan	2

=== Final ===
Italy vs. Japan

Italy
3
Genoa, Italy
11–13 July 1930
Clay

Japan
2

			1	2	3	4	5
1	(Italy) (Japan)	Uberto De Morpurgo; Takeichi Harada	4; 6	3; 6	5; 7
2	(Italy) (Japan)	Giorgio de Stefani; Yoshiro Ota	6; 3	6; 4	4; 6	6; 4
3	(Italy) (Japan)	Uberto De Morpurgo / Giorgio de Stefani; Tamio Abe / Takeichi Harada	8; 6	9; 7	6; 8	2; 6	6; 1
4	(Italy) (Japan)	Giorgio de Stefani; Takeichi Harada	2; 6	5; 7	5; 7
5	(Italy) (Japan)	Uberto De Morpurgo; Yoshiro Ota	6; 0	6; 2	6; 1

== Inter-Zonal Final ==
United States vs. Italy

United States
4
Stade Roland Garros (Paris)
18–20 July 1930
Clay

Italy
1

			1	2	3	4	5
1	(United States) (Italy)	Wilmer Allison; Giorgio de Stefani	4; 6	7; 9	6; 4	8; 6	10; 8
2	(United States) (Italy)	George Lott; Uberto De Morpurgo	3; 6	9; 7	10; 8	6; 3
3	(United States) (Italy)	Wilmer Allison / John Van Ryn; Placido Gaslini / Uberto De Morpurgo	5; 7	6; 2	6; 4	1; 6	6; 3
4	(United States) (Italy)	George Lott; Giorgio de Stefani	6; 3	6; 1	6; 3
5	(United States) (Italy)	Wilmer Allison; Uberto De Morpurgo	5; 7	2; 6	7; 5	4; 6

== Challenge Round ==
France vs. United States

France
4
Stade Roland Garros (Paris)
25–27 July 1930
Clay

United States
1

			1	2	3	4	5
1	(France) (United States)	Jean Borotra; Bill Tilden	6; 2	5; 7	4; 6	5; 7
2	(France) (United States)	Henri Cochet; George Lott	6; 4	6; 2	6; 2
3	(France) (United States)	Jacques Brugnon / Henri Cochet; Wilmer Allison / John Van Ryn	6; 3	7; 5	1; 6	6; 2
4	(France) (United States)	Jean Borotra; George Lott	5; 7	6; 3	2; 6	6; 2	8; 6
5	(France) (United States)	Henri Cochet; Bill Tilden	4; 6	6; 3	6; 1	7; 5

== See also ==
- 1930 Wightman Cup
