= Krešimir Friedrich =

Croatian tennis player, footballer, and lawyer

- Born: 30 July 1898; Koprivnica, Austria-Hungary
- Died: 3 March 1985 (aged 86); Zagreb, Yugoslavia
- Occupation: Lawyer
- Relatives: Dragutin Friedrich (brother)
- Tennis career
- Country (sports): Yugoslavia
- Coach: František Koželuh

Krešimir Friedrich (Croatian pronunciation: [krěʃimir ˈfriːdrix]; 30 July 1898, Koprivnica – 3 March 1985, Zagreb) was a Croatian tennis player, footballer and lawyer from Koprivnica, and a national tennis champion of the Kingdom of Yugoslavia.

== Early life and family ==
Krešimir Friedrich was born in Koprivnica into a family of 11 children, all brothers. He and his brother Ferdo began visiting the local tennis courts in Koprivnica in their youth, frequenting the same club where contemporary painter and eventual fifth-ranked national player and subsequent Davis Cup captain Fedor Malančec trained at the time. They were occasionally hired as ball boys, and thus had a chance to play a bit sometimes.

== Football career ==
Friedrich and his brother Dragutin began playing at the NK Slaven Belupo but soon left for the HAŠK club in 1923 although Krešimir was mostly a reserve player in the latter team.

== Tennis career ==
Friedrich had minor local achievement in the 1920s, including the third place at the VIII HAŠK tournament doubles competition, partnering his brother; the match was won by Ivan Balás and Franz Wilhelm Matejka. In 1930 he won the Ljubljana tournament in doubles and mixed doubles. That same year, he reached third place in the Serbian International Championship in singles and was a runner-up in doubles, pairing with Emil Gabrowitz of Hungary; they only lost to the eventual champions, Franjo Šefer and Ivan Radović.

Friedrich was a national doubles champion in 1928 and 1931 with his brother, Dragutin. He was drafted into the Kingdom of Yugoslavia Davis Cup team in 1929 in Athens, where his team lost to Greece 4 to 1. Friedrich won the only rubber when he defeated Costas Efstratiadis. He was called up twice more, but both meetings resulted in love-match loss for his team. In 1935, in the first international tournament of SK Ilirija in Ljubljana, the Friedrich brothers fell in three straight sets to the well-known duo of Franjo Šefer and Franjo Kukuljević.

He was coached by František Koželuh.

== Works cited ==
=== Primary ===
- Šoškić, Čedomir (2012). Тениски савез Србије Тенис без граница 1922–2012. [Tennis Association of Serbia, Tennis without borders 1922–2012] (PDF) (in Serbian). Belgrade, Serbia: Tennis Association of Serbia. p. 257. Archived from the original (PDF) on 30 December 2013.
- Babović, Milka (2009). "Dragutin Friedrich" (PDF). Zagreb Moj Grad (in Croatian). III (22). Zagreb, Croatia: BIBRA: 15. ISSN 1846-4378. Archived from the original (PDF) on 20 February 2014.

=== Secondary ===
- Kramer, Fredi (2008). Nogometni leksikon [Football Lexicon] (in Croatian). Belgrade, Serbia: Lexicographic Institute.
- "Sport" (PDF). Nova Doba (in Slovenian). VII (98). Celje, Yugoslavia: Milan Četina: 2. 5 September 1925.
- "Tennis" (PDF). Ponedeljek (in Slovenian). IV (22). Ljubljana, Yugoslavia: Adolf Ribikar: 3. 2 June 1930.
- "Nedeljski sport" [Sunday sport] (PDF). Ponedeljski Slovenec (in Slovenian). VIII (22). Ljubljana, Yugoslavia: Konzorcij "Ponedeljskega Slovenca": 4. 3 June 1935.
- Béla Kehrling, ed. (22 October 1930). "Belgrádi Verseny" [Belgrade tournament] (PDF). Tennisz és Golf (in Hungarian). II (19–20). Budapest, Hungary: Bethlen Gábor Irod. és Nyomdai R.T.: 387.
