= Gustavo Vollmer =

Cuban tennis player

- Full name: Gustavo Vollmer-Ravelo
- Country (sports): Cuba
- Died: 29 August 1954 (aged 47)
Medal record
Central American and Caribbean Games
Gold medal – first place	1930 Havana	Men's singles
Silver medal – second place	1930 Havana	Men's doubles
Silver medal – second place	1935 San Salvador	Men's doubles
Bronze medal – third place	1935 San Salvador	Men's singles

Gustavo Vollmer-Ravelo (died 29 August 1954) was a Cuban tennis player. He was of German descent.

Vollmer appeared in three Davis Cup ties for Cuba, against Mexico and the United States in 1929, then Australia in 1932. His two career singles wins both came against Mexican players and he won a set against Harry Hopman when he played Australia.

In Havana in 1930 he won the men's singles competition at the Central American and Caribbean Games.

== See also ==
- List of Cuba Davis Cup team representatives
