= Australia Davis Cup team results (1905–1949) =

National tennis team results

The following article details all results for the Australia Davis Cup team in the period between 1905 and 1949. It does not include ties not completed, for example ties where a walkover occurred. In total, they played 81 Davis Cup ties.

In this period Australia won the Davis Cup on seven occasions (1907, 1908, 1909, 1911, 1914, 1919, and 1939) and were runners-up on eleven occasions (1912, 1920, 1922, 1923, 1924, 1936, 1938, 1946, 1947, 1948, and 1949). They were also qualifying finalists (third place) on five occasions (1905, 1906, 1921, 1925, and 1934).

Please note: Australia assumed all historical records from the Australasia Davis Cup team that competed from 1905 to 1922 and as such, this list includes all these results. At the time, players from New Zealand were eligible to represent this team, however only one player, Anthony Wilding ever did so. From 1923, Australia competed as a standalone nation.

== 1900s ==
=== 1905 ===
Qualifying Semifinals

Australasia
5
Queen's Club, London, England
13–15 July 1905
Grass

Austria
0

			1	2	3	4	5
1	(Australasia) (Austria)	Norman Brookes; Rolf Kinzl	6; 0	6; 1	6; 2
2	(Australasia) (Austria)	Anthony Wilding; Kurt von Wessely	4; 6	6; 3	7; 5	6; 1
3	(Australasia) (Austria)	Norman Brookes / Alfred Dunlop; Rolf Kinzl / Kurt von Wessely	9; 7	6; 2	7; 5
4	(Australasia) (Austria)	Norman Brookes; Kurt von Wessely	6; 0	6; 2	6; 2
5	(Australasia) (Austria)	Anthony Wilding; Rolf Kinzl	6; 3	4; 6	6; 2	6; 4

Qualifying Final

United States
5
Queen's Club, London, England
17–19 July 1905
Grass

Australasia
0

			1	2	3	4	5
1	(United States) (Australasia)	Beals Wright; Norman Brookes	12; 10	5; 7	12; 10	6; 4
2	(United States) (Australasia)	William Larned; Anthony Wilding	6; 3	6; 2	6; 4
3	(United States) (Australasia)	Holcombe Ward / Beals Wright; Norman Brookes / Alfred Dunlop	6; 4	7; 5	5; 7	6; 2
4	(United States) (Australasia)	Beals Wright; Anthony Wilding	6; 3	6; 3
5	(United States) (Australasia)	William Larned; Norman Brookes	14; 12	6; 0	6; 3

=== 1906 ===
Qualifying Final

Australasia
2
Newport Athletic Club, Newport, Wales
7–9 June 1906
Grass

United States
3

			1	2	3	4	5
1	(Australasia) (United States)	Les Poidevin; Holcombe Ward	2; 6	4; 6	5; 7
2	(Australasia) (United States)	Anthony Wilding; Raymond Little	6; 2	8; 6	6; 1
3	(Australasia) (United States)	Les Poidevin / Anthony Wilding; Raymond Little / Holcombe Ward	5; 7	2; 6	4; 6
4	(Australasia) (United States)	Anthony Wilding; Holcombe Ward	6; 3	3; 6	0; 6	6; 4	8; 6
5	(Australasia) (United States)	Les Poidevin; Raymond Little	2; 6	6; 1	5; 7	2; 6

=== 1907 ===
Qualifying Final

Australasia
3
Worple Road, Wimbledon, London, England
13–16 July 1907
Grass

United States
2

			1	2	3	4	5
1	(Australasia) (United States)	Norman Brookes; Beals Wright	6; 4	6; 4	6; 2
2	(Australasia) (United States)	Anthony Wilding; Karl Behr	1; 6	6; 3	3; 6	7; 5	6; 3
3	(Australasia) (United States)	Norman Brookes / Anthony Wilding; Karl Behr / Beals Wright	6; 3	10; 12	6; 4	2; 6	3; 6
4	(Australasia) (United States)	Norman Brookes; Karl Behr	4; 6	6; 4	6; 1	6; 2
5	(Australasia) (United States)	Anthony Wilding; Beals Wright	8; 6	3; 6	3; 6	5; 7

Challenge Round

British Isles
2
Worple Road, Wimbledon, London, England
20–24 July 1907
Grass

Australasia
3

			1	2	3	4	5
1	(United Kingdom) (Australasia)	Arthur Gore; Norman Brookes	5; 7	1; 6	5; 7
2	(United Kingdom) (Australasia)	Herbert Roper Barrett; Anthony Wilding	6; 1	4; 6	3; 6	5; 7
3	(United Kingdom) (Australasia)	Arthur Gore / Herbert Roper Barrett; Norman Brookes / Anthony Wilding	3; 6	4; 6	7; 5	6; 2	13; 11
4	(United Kingdom) (Australasia)	Arthur Gore; Anthony Wilding	3; 6	6; 3	7; 5	6; 2
5	(United Kingdom) (Australasia)	Herbert Roper Barrett; Norman Brookes	2; 6	0; 6	3; 6

=== 1908 ===
Challenge Round

Australasia
3
Albert Ground, Melbourne, Australia
27–30 November 1908
Grass

United States
2

			1	2	3	4	5
1	(Australasia) (United States)	Norman Brookes; Fred Alexander	5; 7	9; 7	6; 2	4; 6	6; 3
2	(Australasia) (United States)	Anthony Wilding; Beals Wright	6; 3	5; 7	3; 6	1; 6
3	(Australasia) (United States)	Norman Brookes / Anthony Wilding; Fred Alexander / Beals Wright	6; 4	6; 2	5; 7	2; 6	6; 4
4	(Australasia) (United States)	Norman Brookes; Beals Wright	6; 0	6; 3	5; 7	2; 6	10; 12
5	(Australasia) (United States)	Anthony Wilding; Fred Alexander	6; 3	6; 4	6; 1

=== 1909 ===
Challenge Round

Australasia
5
Double Bay Grounds, Sydney, Australia
27–30 November 1909
Grass

United States
0

			1	2	3	4	5
1	(Australasia) (United States)	Norman Brookes; Maurice McLoughlin	6; 2	6; 2	6; 4
2	(Australasia) (United States)	Anthony Wilding; Melville Long	6; 2	7; 5	6; 1
3	(Australasia) (United States)	Norman Brookes / Anthony Wilding; Melville Long / Maurice McLoughlin	12; 10	9; 7	6; 3
4	(Australasia) (United States)	Norman Brookes; Melville Long	6; 4	7; 5	8; 6
5	(Australasia) (United States)	Anthony Wilding; Maurice McLoughlin	3; 6	8; 6	6; 2	6; 3

== 1910s ==
=== 1911 ===
Challenge Round

Australasia
4
Lancaster Park, Christchurch, New Zealand
1–3 January 1912
Grass

United States
0

			1	2	3	4	5
1	(Australasia) (United States)	Norman Brookes; Beals Wright	6; 4	2; 6	6; 3	6; 3
2	(Australasia) (United States)	Rodney Heath; William Larned	2; 6	6; 1	7; 5	6; 2
3	(Australasia) (United States)	Norman Brookes / Alfred Dunlop; Maurice McLoughlin / Beals Wright	6; 4	5; 7	7; 5	6; 4
4	(Australasia) (United States)	Norman Brookes; Maurice McLoughlin	6; 4	3; 6	4; 6	6; 3	6; 4
5	(Australasia) (United States)	Rodney Heath; Beals Wright						not played

=== 1912 ===
Challenge Round

Australasia
2
Albert Ground, Melbourne, Australia
28–30 November 1912
Grass

British Isles
3

			1	2	3	4	5
1	(Australasia) (United Kingdom)	Norman Brookes; James Cecil Parke	6; 8	3; 6	7; 5	2; 6
2	(Australasia) (United Kingdom)	Rodney Heath; Charles Dixon	7; 5	4; 6	4; 6	4; 6
3	(Australasia) (United Kingdom)	Norman Brookes / Alfred Dunlop; Alfred Beamish / James Cecil Parke	6; 4	6; 1	7; 5
4	(Australasia) (United Kingdom)	Norman Brookes; Charles Dixon	6; 2	6; 4	6; 4
5	(Australasia) (United Kingdom)	Rodney Heath; James Cecil Parke	3; 6	4; 6	4; 6

=== 1913 ===
Qualifying Quarterfinals

United States
4
West Side Tennis Club, New York, NY, United States
6–9 June 1913
Grass

Australasia
1

			1	2	3	4	5
1	(United States) (Australasia)	Maurice McLoughlin; Horace Rice	6; 1	6; 3	6; 3
2	(United States) (Australasia)	Richard Norris Williams; Stanley Doust	6; 4	6; 4	1; 6	7; 5
3	(United States) (Australasia)	Harold Hackett / Maurice McLoughlin; Stanley Doust / Alfred Jones	6; 2	2; 6	7; 5	2; 6	7; 9
4	(United States) (Australasia)	Maurice McLoughlin; Stanley Doust	6; 4	6; 4	6; 2
5	(United States) (Australasia)	Richard Norris Williams; Horace Rice	1; 6	4; 6	9; 7	6; 1	6; 2

=== 1914 ===
Qualifying Quarterfinals

Australasia
5
Onwentsia Club, Lake Forest, IL, United States
23–25 July 1914
Grass

Canada
0

			1	2	3	4	5
1	(Australasia) (Canada)	Norman Brookes; Bernard Schwengers	6; 2	6; 3	6; 2
2	(Australasia) (Canada)	Anthony Wilding; Robert Powell	6; 1	6; 2	6; 2
3	(Australasia) (Canada)	Norman Brookes / Anthony Wilding; Robert Powell / Bernard Schwengers	6; 4	6; 3	6; 4
4	(Australasia) (Canada)	Norman Brookes; Robert Powell	6; 0	6; 1	6; 3
5	(Australasia) (Canada)	Anthony Wilding; Bernard Schwengers	7; 5	6; 3	6; 1

Qualifying Semifinals

Australasia
5
Allegheny County Club, Pittsburgh, PA, United States
30 July–1 August 1914
Grass

Germany
0

			1	2	3	4	5
1	(Australasia) (Germany)	Norman Brookes; Otto Froitzheim	10; 8	6; 1	6; 2
2	(Australasia) (Germany)	Anthony Wilding; Oscar Kreuzer	6; 2	6; 2	6; 4
3	(Australasia) (Germany)	Norman Brookes / Anthony Wilding; Otto Froitzheim / Oscar Kreuzer	6; 1	6; 1	6; 2
4	(Australasia) (Germany)	Norman Brookes; Oscar Kreuzer	6; 4	6; 2	6; 8	6; 2
5	(Australasia) (Germany)	Anthony Wilding; Otto Froitzheim	6; 3	6; 4	6; 2

Qualifying Final

Australasia
3
Longwood Cricket Club, New York, NY, United States
6–8 August 1914
Grass

Great Britain
2

			1	2	3	4	5
1	(Australasia) (United Kingdom)	Norman Brookes; James Cecil Parke	6; 2	4; 6	6; 3	1; 6	7; 5
2	(Australasia) (United Kingdom)	Anthony Wilding; Arthur Lowe	6; 3	6; 1	16; 14
3	(Australasia) (United Kingdom)	Norman Brookes / Anthony Wilding; Theodore Mavrogordato / James Cecil Parke	6; 1	6; 0	6; 4
4	(Australasia) (United Kingdom)	Norman Brookes; Arthur Lowe						w/o
5	(Australasia) (United Kingdom)	Anthony Wilding; James Cecil Parke						w/o

Challenge Round

United States
2
West Side Tennis Club, New York, NY, United States
13–15 August 1914
Grass

Australasia
3

			1	2	3	4	5
1	(United States) (Australasia)	Richard Norris Williams; Anthony Wilding	5; 7	2; 6	3; 6
2	(United States) (Australasia)	Maurice McLoughlin; Norman Brookes	17; 15	6; 3	6; 3
3	(United States) (Australasia)	Thomas Bundy / Maurice McLoughlin; Norman Brookes / Anthony Wilding	3; 6	6; 8	7; 9
4	(United States) (Australasia)	Richard Norris Williams; Norman Brookes	1; 6	2; 6	10; 8	3; 6
5	(United States) (Australasia)	Maurice McLoughlin; Anthony Wilding	6; 2	6; 3	2; 6	6; 2

=== 1919 ===
Challenge Round

Australasia
4
Double Bay Grounds, Sydney, Australia
16–21 January 1920
Grass

Great Britain
1

			1	2	3	4	5
1	(Australasia) (United Kingdom)	James Anderson; Algernon Kingscote	5; 7	2; 6	4; 6
2	(Australasia) (United Kingdom)	Gerald Patterson; Arthur Lowe	6; 4	6; 3	2; 6	6; 3
3	(Australasia) (United Kingdom)	Norman Brookes / Gerald Patterson; Alfred Beamish / Algernon Kingscote	6; 0	6; 0	6; 2
4	(Australasia) (United Kingdom)	Gerald Patterson; Algernon Kingscote	6; 4	6; 4	8; 6
5	(Australasia) (United Kingdom)	James Anderson; Arthur Lowe	6; 4	5; 7	6; 3	4; 6	12; 10

== 1920s ==
=== 1920 ===
Challenge Round

Australasia
0
Domain Cricket Club, Auckland, New Zealand
30 December 1920–1 January 1921
Grass

United States
5

			1	2	3	4	5
1	(Australasia) (United States)	Norman Brookes; Bill Tilden	8; 10	4; 6	6; 1	4; 6
2	(Australasia) (United States)	Gerald Patterson; Bill Johnston	3; 6	1; 6	1; 6
3	(Australasia) (United States)	Norman Brookes / Gerald Patterson; Bill Johnston / Bill Tilden	6; 4	4; 6	0; 6	4; 6
4	(Australasia) (United States)	Gerald Patterson; Bill Tilden	7; 5	2; 6	3; 6	3; 6
5	(Australasia) (United States)	Norman Brookes; Bill Johnston	7; 5	5; 7	3; 6	3; 6

=== 1921 ===
Qualifying First round

Canada
0
Toronto Lawn Tennis Club, Toronto, Ontario
23–27 July 1921
Clay

Australasia
5

			1	2	3	4	5
1	(Canada) (Australasia)	Henri Laframboise; James Anderson	6; 4	5; 7	0; 6	2; 6
2	(Canada) (Australasia)	Paul Bennett; John Hawkes	6; 8	4; 6	4; 6
3	(Canada) (Australasia)	Paul Bennett / George Holmes; James Anderson / Clarence Todd	2; 6	3; 6	1; 6
4	(Canada) (Australasia)	Paul Bennett; James Anderson	3; 6	0; 6	2; 6
5	(Canada) (Australasia)	Henri Laframboise; Clarence Todd	2; 6	2; 6	8; 6	2; 6

Qualifying Quarterfinals

Australasia
3
Allegheny County Club, Pittsburgh, Pennsylvania
4–6 August 1921
Grass

Great Britain
2

			1	2	3	4	5
1	(Australasia) (United Kingdom)	James Anderson; Max Woosnam	6; 4	6; 2	6; 4
2	(Australasia) (United Kingdom)	John Hawkes; Gordon Lowe	4; 6	4; 6	1; 6
3	(Australasia) (United Kingdom)	James Anderson / Clarence Todd; Noel Turnbull / Max Woosnam	4; 6	9; 7	4; 6	6; 2	6; 4
4	(Australasia) (United Kingdom)	James Anderson; Gordon Lowe	6; 2	6; 3	3; 6	6; 2
5	(Australasia) (United Kingdom)	John Hawkes; Max Woosnam	3; 6	6; 0	9; 7	3; 6	3; 6

Qualifying Semifinals

Australasia
5
Mayfield Country Club, Cleveland, Ohio
19–21 August 1921
Grass

Denmark
0

			1	2	3	4	5
1	(Australasia) (Denmark)	James Anderson; Vagn Ingerslev	6; 0	6; 1	7; 5
2	(Australasia) (Denmark)	Norman Peach; Erik Tegner	7; 5	6; 2	6; 4
3	(Australasia) (Denmark)	James Anderson / Clarence Todd; Povl Henriksen / Erik Tegner	6; 0	6; 2	6; 1
4	(Australasia) (Denmark)	James Anderson; Erik Tegner	6; 0	6; 2	6; 1
5	(Australasia) (Denmark)	Norman Peach; Vagn Ingerslev	3; 6	6; 2	6; 0	3; 6	6; 2

Qualifying Final

Japan
4
Newport Casino, Newport, Rhode Island
22–27 August 1921
Grass

Australasia
1

			1	2	3	4	5
1	(Japan) (Australasia)	Zenzo Shimizu; James Anderson	6; 4	7; 5	6; 4
2	(Japan) (Australasia)	Ichiya Kumagae; John Hawkes	3; 6	2; 6	8; 6	6; 2	6; 3
3	(Japan) (Australasia)	Ichiya Kumagae / Zenzo Shimizu; James Anderson / Clarence Todd	6; 4	4; 6	6; 8	0; 6
4	(Japan) (Australasia)	Zenzo Shimizu; John Hawkes	4; 6	6; 2	6; 3	6; 2
5	(Japan) (Australasia)	Ichiya Kumagae; James Anderson	3; 6	6; 4	2; 6	7; 5	6; 2

=== 1922 ===
Qualifying First round

Australasia
4
Yorkshire Lawn Tennis Club, Scarborough, England
22–24 June 1922
Grass

Belgium
0

			1	2	3	4	5
1	(Australasia) (Belgium)	Gerald Patterson; Jean Washer	6; 3	6; 4	6; 4
2	(Australasia) (Belgium)	James Anderson; Georges Watson	6; 2	6; 1	6; 2
3	(Australasia) (Belgium)	James Anderson / Pat O'Hara Wood; Jean Washer / Georges Watson	6; 1	6; 2	4; 6	7; 9	7; 5
4	(Australasia) (Belgium)	James Anderson; Jean Washer	6; 4	6; 3	6; 2
5	(Australasia) (Belgium)	Gerald Patterson; Georges Watson						not played

Qualifying Quarterfinals

Australasia
5
Roehampton Lawn Tennis Club, London, England
14–15 July 1922
Clay

Czechoslovakia
0

			1	2	3	4	5
1	(Australasia) (Czechoslovakia)	Gerald Patterson; Friedrich Rohrer	6; 1	6; 3	3; 6	6; 2
2	(Australasia) (Czechoslovakia)	James Anderson; Karel Ardelt	7; 5	6; 4	6; 4
3	(Australasia) (Czechoslovakia)	Gerald Patterson / Rupert Wertheim; Karel Ardelt / Friedrich Rohrer	9; 7	6; 0	6; 3
4	(Australasia) (Czechoslovakia)	Gerald Patterson; Karel Ardelt	6; 3	6; 2	2; 6	6; 2
5	(Australasia) (Czechoslovakia)	James Anderson; Friedrich Rohrer	4; 6	6; 4	6; 3	6; 0

Qualifying Semifinals

Australasia
4
Longwood Cricket Club, Boston, MA, United States
10–14 August 1922
Grass

France
1

			1	2	3	4	5
1	(Australasia) (France)	Gerald Patterson; André Gobert	4; 6	3; 6	6; 3	6; 4	6; 3
2	(Australasia) (France)	Pat O'Hara Wood; Henri Cochet	4; 6	6; 3	0; 6	9; 7	3; 6
3	(Australasia) (France)	Pat O'Hara Wood / Gerald Patterson; Henri Cochet / André Gobert	6; 0	6; 8	4; 6	6; 3	10; 8
4	(Australasia) (France)	Gerald Patterson; Henri Cochet	6; 2	2; 6	6; 4	6; 2
5	(Australasia) (France)	Pat O'Hara Wood; André Gobert	2; 6	6; 2	6; 1	6; 4

Qualifying Final

Australasia
4
Germantown Cricket Club, Philadelphia, PA, United States
17–19 August 1922
Grass

Spain
1

			1	2	3	4	5
1	(Australasia) (Spain)	Gerald Patterson; Manuel de Gomar	6; 3	8; 6	6; 4
2	(Australasia) (Spain)	Pat O'Hara Wood; Manuel Alonso Areizaga	6; 2	6; 3	2; 6	6; 8	1; 6
3	(Australasia) (Spain)	Pat O'Hara Wood / Gerald Patterson; Manuel Alonso Areizaga / Manuel de Gomar	6; 3	6; 3	6; 4
4	(Australasia) (Spain)	Gerald Patterson; Manuel Alonso Areizaga	8; 6	6; 2	6; 2
5	(Australasia) (Spain)	Pat O'Hara Wood; Manuel de Gomar	6; 8	3; 6	6; 0	6; 4	6; 1

Challenge Round

United States
4
West Side Tennis Club, New York, NY, United States
1–5 September 1922
Grass

Australasia
1

			1	2	3	4	5
1	(United States) (Australasia)	Bill Tilden; Gerald Patterson	7; 5	10; 8	6; 0
2	(United States) (Australasia)	Bill Johnston; James Anderson	6; 1	6; 2	6; 3
3	(United States) (Australasia)	Vincent Richards / Bill Tilden; Pat O'Hara Wood / Gerald Patterson	4; 6	0; 6	3; 6
4	(United States) (Australasia)	Bill Tilden; James Anderson	6; 4	5; 7	3; 6	6; 4	6; 2
5	(United States) (Australasia)	Bill Johnston; Gerald Patterson	6; 2	6; 2	6; 1

=== 1923 ===
America Zone Semifinals

Hawaii
1
Orange Lawn Tennis Club, Orange, NJ, United States
26–28 July 1923
Grass

Australia
4

			1	2	3	4	5
1	(Hawaii) (Australia)	Bowie Detrick; James Anderson	1; 6	3; 6	3; 6
2	(Hawaii) (Australia)	William Eklund; John Hawkes	2; 6	1; 6	4; 6
3	(Hawaii) (Australia)	Bowie Detrick / William Eklund; James Anderson / John Hawkes	0; 6	6; 8	5; 7
4	(Hawaii) (Australia)	Bowie Detrick; John Hawkes	3; 6	1; 6	1; 6
5	(Hawaii) (Australia)	William Eklund; Richard Schlesinger	6; 4	4; 6	6; 1	6; 4

America Zone Final

Australia
4
South Side Tennis Club, Chicago, IL, United States
9–12 August 1923
Grass

Japan
1

			1	2	3	4	5
1	(Australia) (Japan)	James Anderson; Zenzo Shimizu	6; 0	6; 3	6; 3
2	(Australia) (Japan)	John Hawkes; Masanosuke Fukuda	6; 3	6; 4	6; 3
3	(Australia) (Japan)	James Anderson / John Hawkes; Seiichiro Kashio / Zenzo Shimizu	6; 1	6; 2	6; 2
4	(Australia) (Japan)	John Hawkes; Zenzo Shimizu	4; 6	6; 3	6; 2	1; 6	4; 6
5	(Australia) (Japan)	James Anderson; Masanosuke Fukuda	6; 1	3; 6	6; 2	6; 1

Inter-Zonal Final

Australia
4
Longwood Cricket Club, Boston, MA, United States
16–18 August 1923
Grass

France
1

			1	2	3	4	5
1	(Australia) (France)	James Anderson; René Lacoste	7; 5	6; 3	6; 4
2	(Australia) (France)	John Hawkes; Jacques Brugnon	6; 2	6; 1	7; 5
3	(Australia) (France)	James Anderson / John Hawkes; Jacques Brugnon / René Lacoste	6; 8	6; 3	6; 3	6; 8	9; 7
4	(Australia) (France)	James Anderson; Pierre Hirsch	7; 5	6; 2	6; 0
5	(Australia) (France)	Ian McInnes; René Lacoste	2; 6	1; 6	2; 6

Challenge Round

United States
4
West Side Tennis Club, New York, NY, United States
31 August–3 September 1923
Grass

Australia
1

			1	2	3	4	5
1	(United States) (Australia)	Bill Johnston; James Anderson	6; 4	2; 6	6; 2	5; 7	2; 6
2	(United States) (Australia)	Bill Tilden; John Hawkes	6; 4	6; 2	6; 1
3	(United States) (Australia)	Bill Tilden / Richard Norris Williams; James Anderson / John Hawkes	17; 15	11; 13	2; 6	6; 3	6; 2
4	(United States) (Australia)	Bill Johnston; John Hawkes	6; 0	6; 2	6; 1
5	(United States) (Australia)	Bill Tilden; James Anderson	6; 2	6; 3	1; 6	7; 5

=== 1924 ===
America Zone Quarterfinals

Australia
5
Crescent Athletic Club, Brooklyn, NY, United States
31 July–1 August 1924
Grass

China
0

			1	2	3	4	5
1	(Australia) (China)	Gerald Patterson; Wei Wing Lock	6; 1	6; 2	6; 2
2	(Australia) (China)	Pat O'Hara Wood; Paul Kong	6; 0	6; 1	6; 2
3	(Australia) (China)	Pat O'Hara Wood / Gerald Patterson; Huang Ching / Wei Wing Lock	6; 1	6; 2	6; 0
4	(Australia) (China)	Gerald Patterson; Paul Kong	6; 0	6; 0	6; 2
5	(Australia) (China)	Pat O'Hara Wood; Wei Wing Lock	6; 0	6; 0	6; 2

America Zone Semifinals

Australia
5
Baltimore Country Club, Baltimore, MD, United States
7–9 August 1924
Grass

Mexico
0

			1	2	3	4	5
1	(Australia) (Mexico)	Gerald Patterson; Manuel Llano	6; 0	6; 1	6; 2
2	(Australia) (Mexico)	Pat O'Hara Wood; Ignacio de la Borbolla	6; 3	6; 0	9; 7
3	(Australia) (Mexico)	Pat O'Hara Wood / Gerald Patterson; Ignacio de la Borbolla / Francisco Gerdes	6; 4	6; 4	6; 0
4	(Australia) (Mexico)	Gerald Patterson; Ignacio de la Borbolla	6; 2	6; 2	6; 1
5	(Australia) (Mexico)	Pat O'Hara Wood; Francisco Gerdes	6; 1	6; 2	6; 1

America Zone Final

Australia
5
Agawam Hunt Club, Providence, RI, United States
14–16 August 1924
Grass

Japan
0

			1	2	3	4	5
1	(Australia) (Japan)	Gerald Patterson; Zenzo Shimizu	7; 5	11; 9	6; 4
2	(Australia) (Japan)	Pat O'Hara Wood; Sunao Okamoto	6; 4	2; 6	6; 4	2; 6	6; 1
3	(Australia) (Japan)	Pat O'Hara Wood / Gerald Patterson; Takeichi Harada / Sunao Okamoto	7; 5	6; 2	6; 4
4	(Australia) (Japan)	Gerald Patterson; Sunao Okamoto	7; 5	6; 1	6; 4
5	(Australia) (Japan)	Pat O'Hara Wood; Zenzo Shimizu	6; 4	6; 4	6; 2

Inter-Zonal Final

Australia
3
Longwood Cricket Club, Boston, MA, United States
4–6 September 1924
Grass

France
2

			1	2	3	4	5
1	(Australia) (France)	Gerald Patterson; René Lacoste	3; 6	2; 6	8; 10
2	(Australia) (France)	Pat O'Hara Wood; Jean Borotra	1; 6	6; 4	1; 6	6; 4	6; 2
3	(Australia) (France)	Pat O'Hara Wood / Gerald Patterson; Jacques Brugnon / René Lacoste	6; 4	6; 4	6; 2
4	(Australia) (France)	Pat O'Hara Wood; René Lacoste	10; 8	1; 6	1; 6	5; 7
5	(Australia) (France)	Gerald Patterson; Jean Borotra	6; 3	6; 1	6; 3

Challenge Round

United States
5
Germantown Cricket Club, Philadelphia, PA, United States
11–13 September 1924
Grass

Australia
0

			1	2	3	4	5
1	(United States) (Australia)	Bill Tilden; Gerald Patterson	6; 4	6; 2	6; 2
2	(United States) (Australia)	Vincent Richards; Pat O'Hara Wood	6; 3	6; 2	6; 4
3	(United States) (Australia)	Bill Johnston / Bill Tilden; Pat O'Hara Wood / Gerald Patterson	5; 7	6; 3	6; 4	6; 1
4	(United States) (Australia)	Bill Tilden; Pat O'Hara Wood	6; 2	6; 1	6; 1
5	(United States) (Australia)	Vincent Richards; Gerald Patterson	6; 3	7; 5	6; 4

=== 1925 ===
America Zone
Semifinals

Canada
0
Mount Royal Tennis Club, Montreal, Canada
13–15 August 1925
Grass

Australia
5

			1	2	3	4	5
1	(Canada) (Australia)	Willard Crocker; James Anderson	1; 6	3; 6	2; 6
2	(Canada) (Australia)	Jack Wright; Gerald Patterson	7; 5	6; 3	3; 6	1; 6	3; 6
3	(Canada) (Australia)	Willard Crocker / Jack Wright; John Hawkes / Gerald Patterson	0; 6	2; 6	4; 6
4	(Canada) (Australia)	Jack Wright; James Anderson	2; 6	4; 6	1; 6
5	(Canada) (Australia)	Willard Crocker; Gerald Patterson	4; 6	9; 11	4; 6

America Zone
Final

Australia
4
Longwood Cricket Club, Boston, MA, United States
20–22 August 1925
Grass

Japan
1

			1	2	3	4	5
1	(Australia) (Japan)	Gerald Patterson; Zenzo Shimizu	6; 1	6; 4	6; 2
2	(Australia) (Japan)	James Anderson; Takeichi Harada	6; 4	3; 6	6; 3	6; 1
3	(Australia) (Japan)	John Hawkes / Gerald Patterson; Takeichi Harada / Zenzo Shimizu	6; 1	6; 2	9; 7
4	(Australia) (Japan)	Gerald Patterson; Takeichi Harada	2; 6	6; 3	1; 6	5; 7
5	(Australia) (Japan)	John Hawkes; Masanosuke Fukuda	6; 1	6; 3	6; 0

Inter-Zonal
Final

France
3
West Side Tennis Club, Forest Hills, NY, United States
4–5 September 1925
Grass

Australia
1

			1	2	3	4	5
1	(France) (Australia)	René Lacoste; Gerald Patterson	3; 6	4; 6	2; 6
2	(France) (Australia)	Jean Borotra; James Anderson	6; 4	6; 3	8; 6
3	(France) (Australia)	Jean Borotra / René Lacoste; John Hawkes / Gerald Patterson	6; 4	3; 6	6; 4	1; 6	10; 8
4	(France) (Australia)	Jean Borotra; Gerald Patterson	4; 6	6; 4	6; 1	6; 3
5	(France) (Australia)	René Lacoste; James Anderson						not played

=== 1928 ===
Europe Zone
First Round

Italy
4
Genoa, Italy
4–9 May 1928
Clay

Australia
1

			1	2	3	4	5
1	(Italy) (Australia)	Uberto De Morpurgo; Jack Crawford	7; 5	6; 3	6; 2
2	(Italy) (Australia)	Giorgio de Stefani; Gerald Patterson	1; 6	3; 6	3; 6
3	(Italy) (Australia)	Placido Gaslini / Uberto De Morpurgo; Harry Hopman / Gerald Patterson	6; 3	6; 4	1; 6	1; 6	6; 2
4	(Italy) (Australia)	Uberto De Morpurgo; Gerald Patterson	1; 6	6; 4	6; 3	2; 6	6; 1
5	(Italy) (Australia)	Giorgio de Stefani; Harry Hopman	7; 5	8; 6	10; 8

== 1930s ==
=== 1930 ===
Europe Zone
First round

Switzerland
0
Zürich, Switzerland
2–4 May 1930

Australia
5

			1	2	3	4	5
1	(Switzerland) (Australia)	Hector Chiesa; Edgar Moon	6; 3	2; 6	1; 6	1; 6
2	(Switzerland) (Australia)	Charles Aeschlimann; Jack Crawford	0; 6	3; 6	1; 6
3	(Switzerland) (Australia)	Charles Aeschlimann / Jean Wuarin; Harry Hopman / James Willard	6; 2	4; 6	2; 6	3; 6
4	(Switzerland) (Australia)	Hector Chiesa; Jack Crawford	4; 6	8; 10	3; 6
5	(Switzerland) (Australia)	Charles Aeschlimann; Edgar Moon	6; 3	1; 6	4; 6	3; 6

Europe Zone
Second round

Ireland
1
Fitzwilliam Lawn Tennis Club, Dublin, Ireland
15–17 May 1930
Grass

Australia
4

			1	2	3	4	5
1	(Republic of Ireland) (Australia)	Edward McGuire; Jack Crawford	1; 6	2; 6	4; 6
2	(Republic of Ireland) (Australia)	George Lyttleton-Rogers; Edgar Moon	6; 4	6; 2	3; 6	2; 6	10; 12
3	(Republic of Ireland) (Australia)	Vincent Allman-Smith / George Lyttleton-Rogers; Harry Hopman / James Willard	4; 6	2; 6	2; 6
4	(Republic of Ireland) (Australia)	George Lyttleton-Rogers; Jack Crawford	6; 3	3; 6	7; 5	2; 6	6; 3
5	(Republic of Ireland) (Australia)	Edward McGuire; Edgar Moon	2; 6	5; 7	6; 3	6; 8

Europe Zone
Quarterfinals

Great Britain
1
Devonshire Park Lawn Tennis Club, Eastbourne, England
6–9 June 1930
Grass

Australia
4

			1	2	3	4	5
1	(United Kingdom) (Australia)	Harry Lee; Jack Crawford	6; 3	2; 6	6; 4	2; 6	2; 6
2	(United Kingdom) (Australia)	Colin Gregory; Harry Hopman	6; 8	4; 6	7; 9
3	(United Kingdom) (Australia)	Ian Collins / Colin Gregory; Jack Crawford / Harry Hopman	8; 6	10; 8	6; 2
4	(United Kingdom) (Australia)	Harry Lee; Harry Hopman	3; 6	6; 4	9; 7	2; 6	4; 6
5	(United Kingdom) (Australia)	Colin Gregory; Jack Crawford	2; 6	5; 7	8; 6	3; 6

Europe Zone
Semifinals

Italy
3
Milan, Italy
14–16 June 1930
Clay

Australia
2

			1	2	3	4	5
1	(Italy) (Australia)	Giorgio de Stefani; Harry Hopman	6; 3	3; 6	7; 5	6; 2
2	(Italy) (Australia)	Uberto De Morpurgo; Jack Crawford	5; 7	6; 2	6; 4	3; 6	6; 4
3	(Italy) (Australia)	Placido Gaslini / Uberto De Morpurgo; Harry Hopman / James Willard	7; 9	7; 9	6; 4	4; 6
4	(Italy) (Australia)	Uberto De Morpurgo; Harry Hopman	8; 6	2; 6	6; 4	1; 6	6; 1
5	(Italy) (Australia)	Giorgio de Stefani; Jack Crawford	4; 6	3; 6	2; 6

=== 1932 ===
America Zone
NCA Semifinals

Cuba
0
Ferroviario Tennis Club, Havana, Cuba
13–15 May 1932

Australia
5

			1	2	3	4	5
1	(Cuba) (Australia)	Ricardo Morales; Jack Crawford	3; 6	1; 6	5; 7
2	(Cuba) (Australia)	Gustavo Vollmer; Harry Hopman	2; 6	1; 6	6; 4	1; 6
3	(Cuba) (Australia)	Ricardo Morales / Gustavo Vollmer; Jack Crawford / Harry Hopman	6; 4	4; 6	6; 8	4; 6
4	(Cuba) (Australia)	Ricardo Morales; Harry Hopman	2; 6	2; 6	4; 6
5	(Cuba) (Australia)	Gustavo Vollmer; Clifford Sproule	1; 6	1; 6	4; 6

America Zone
NCA Final

United States
5
Philadelphia Country Club, Philadelphia, PA, United States
27–30 May 1932
Clay

Australia
0

			1	2	3	4	5
1	(United States) (Australia)	Frank Shields; Harry Hopman	6; 4	6; 1	6; 2
2	(United States) (Australia)	Ellsworth Vines; Jack Crawford	6; 2	6; 4	2; 6	6; 4
3	(United States) (Australia)	Wilmer Allison / John Van Ryn; Jack Crawford / Harry Hopman	6; 0	6; 4	5; 7	7; 5
4	(United States) (Australia)	Frank Shields; Jack Crawford	6; 4	7; 5	4; 6	3; 6	6; 2
5	(United States) (Australia)	Ellsworth Vines; Harry Hopman	6; 2	9; 11	6; 4	6; 4

=== 1933 ===
Europe Zone
Second Round

Norway
0
Oslo, Norway
12–14 May 1933
Clay

Australia
5

			1	2	3	4	5
1	(Norway) (Australia)	Johan Haanes; Jack Crawford	1; 6	3; 6	3; 6
2	(Norway) (Australia)	Finn-Trygve Smith; Vivian McGrath	1; 6	1; 6	3; 6
3	(Norway) (Australia)	Johan Haanes / Ragnar Hagen; Jack Crawford / Don Turnbull	2; 6	3; 6	1; 6
4	(Norway) (Australia)	Finn-Trygve Smith; Adrian Quist	5; 7	6; 4	1; 6	0; 6
5	(Norway) (Australia)	Johan Haanes; Vivian McGrath	5; 7	5; 7	2; 6

Europe Zone
Quarterfinals

Australia
3
Queen's Club, London, England
10–13 June 1933
Grass

South Africa
2

			1	2	3	4	5
1	(Australia) (South Africa)	Jack Crawford; Vernon Kirby	8; 6	6; 1	6; 3
2	(Australia) (South Africa)	Vivian McGrath; Colin Robbins	7; 5	6; 4	4; 6	10; 8
3	(Australia) (South Africa)	Jack Crawford / Vivian McGrath; Norman Farquharson / Vernon Kirby	4; 6	4; 6	4; 6
4	(Australia) (South Africa)	Vivian McGrath; Vernon Kirby	8; 6	0; 6	4; 6	2; 6
5	(Australia) (South Africa)	Jack Crawford; Colin Robbins	6; 4	6; 1	6; 0

Europe Zone
Semifinals

Australia
3
Stade Roland Garros, Paris, France
17–19 June 1933
Clay

Japan
2

			1	2	3	4	5
1	(Australia) (Japan)	Jack Crawford; Ryosuke Nunoi	6; 2	4; 6	6; 3	4; 6	7; 5
2	(Australia) (Japan)	Vivian McGrath; Jiro Sato	9; 7	1; 6	4; 6	6; 4	7; 5
3	(Australia) (Japan)	Jack Crawford / Adrian Quist; Ryosuke Nunoi / Jiro Sato	7; 5	7; 9	6; 3	3; 6	6; 3
4	(Australia) (Japan)	Vivian McGrath; Ryosuke Nunoi	4; 6	4; 6	8; 6	5; 7
5	(Australia) (Japan)	Jack Crawford; Jiro Sato	6; 3	3; 6	1; 6	6; 1	2; 6

Europe Zone
Final

Great Britain
3
Centre Court, All England Club, Wimbledon, England
13–15 July 1933
Grass

Australia
2

			1	2	3	4	5
1	(United Kingdom) (Australia)	Bunny Austin; Jack Crawford	6; 4	2; 6	2; 6	3; 6
2	(United Kingdom) (Australia)	Fred Perry; Vivian McGrath	6; 2	6; 4	6; 2
3	(United Kingdom) (Australia)	Pat Hughes / Fred Perry; Adrian Quist / Don Turnbull	7; 5	6; 4	3; 6	6; 3
4	(United Kingdom) (Australia)	Bunny Austin; Vivian McGrath	6; 4	7; 5	6; 3
5	(United Kingdom) (Australia)	Harry Lee; Jack Crawford	6; 8	5; 7	4; 6

=== 1934 ===
Europe Zone
Quarterfinals

Australia
4
Devonshire Park Lawn Tennis Club, Eastbourne, England
7–9 June 1934
Grass

Japan
1

			1	2	3	4	5
1	(Australia) (Japan)	Vivian McGrath; Jiro Yamagishi	2; 6	7; 5	6; 2	6; 4
2	(Australia) (Japan)	Jack Crawford; Jiro Fujikura	6; 3	6; 3	11; 9
3	(Australia) (Japan)	Jack Crawford / Adrian Quist; Hideo Nishimura / Jiro Yamagishi	6; 1	6; 0	4; 6	9; 7
4	(Australia) (Japan)	Don Turnbull; Jiro Yamagishi	6; 4	7; 5	9; 7
5	(Australia) (Japan)	Vivian McGrath; Jiro Fujikura	4; 6	7; 5	2; 6	6; 8

Europe Zone
Semifinals

France
2
Stade Roland Garros, Paris, France
15–17 June 1934
Clay

Australia
3

			1	2	3	4	5
1	(France) (Australia)	Christian Boussus; Vivian McGrath	3; 6	6; 0	8; 6	2; 6	2; 6
2	(France) (Australia)	André Merlin; Jack Crawford	4; 6	6; 4	6; 4	6; 2
3	(France) (Australia)	Jean Borotra / Jacques Brugnon; Jack Crawford / Adrian Quist	3; 6	4; 6	7; 5	6; 4	3; 6
4	(France) (Australia)	Christian Boussus; Jack Crawford	6; 2	2; 6	6; 4	4; 6	0; 6
5	(France) (Australia)	André Merlin; Vivian McGrath	4; 6	6; 2	6; 3	6; 0

Europe Zone
Final

Czechoslovakia
2
Prague, Czechoslovakia
13–15 July 1934
Clay

Australia
3

			1	2	3	4	5
1	(Czechoslovakia) (Australia)	Roderich Menzel; Vivian McGrath	10; 8	6; 2	8; 6
2	(Czechoslovakia) (Australia)	Ladislav Hecht; Jack Crawford	4; 6	2; 6	2; 6
3	(Czechoslovakia) (Australia)	Ladislav Hecht / Roderich Menzel; Jack Crawford / Adrian Quist	4; 6	3; 6	4; 6
4	(Czechoslovakia) (Australia)	Roderich Menzel; Jack Crawford	6; 4	6; 4	2; 6	8; 6
5	(Czechoslovakia) (Australia)	Ladislav Hecht; Vivian McGrath	6; 3	2; 6	1; 6	5; 7

Inter-Zonal
Final

United States
3
Centre Court, All England Club, Wimbledon, England
21–25 July 1934
Grass

Australia
2

			1	2	3	4	5
1	(United States) (Australia)	Frank Shields; Jack Crawford	1; 6	2; 6	10; 12
2	(United States) (Australia)	Sidney Wood; Vivian McGrath	5; 7	4; 6	6; 1	7; 9
3	(United States) (Australia)	George Lott / Lester Stoefen; Jack Crawford / Adrian Quist	6; 4	6; 4	2; 6	6; 4
4	(United States) (Australia)	Sidney Wood; Jack Crawford	6; 3	9; 7	4; 6	4; 6	6; 2
5	(United States) (Australia)	Frank Shields; Vivian McGrath	6; 4	6; 2	6; 4

=== 1935 ===
Europe Zone
First Round

Australia
3
Devonshire Park Lawn Tennis Club, Eastbourne, England
12–14 May 1935
Grass

New Zealand
0

			1	2	3	4	5
1	(Australia) (New Zealand)	Jack Crawford; Eskell Andrews	6; 4	6; 4	7; 5
2	(Australia) (New Zealand)	Vivian McGrath; Alan Stedman	6; 3	6; 2	8; 6
3	(Australia) (New Zealand)	Jack Crawford / Adrian Quist; Cam Malfroy / Alan Stedman	6; 3	4; 6	6; 1	6; 4
4	(Australia) (New Zealand)	Jack Crawford; Alan Stedman	14; 12	17; 15	4; 3			not completed
5	(Australia) (New Zealand)	Vivian McGrath; Eskell Andrews						not played

Europe Zone
Quarterfinals

France
2
Stade Roland Garros, Paris, France
8–10 June 1935
Clay

Australia
3

			1	2	3	4	5
1	(France) (Australia)	André Merlin; Jack Crawford	4; 6	6; 4	3; 6	3; 6
2	(France) (Australia)	Christian Boussus; Vivian McGrath	6; 4	4; 6	8; 6	6; 1
3	(France) (Australia)	Marcel Bernard / Jean Borotra; Jack Crawford / Adrian Quist	3; 6	6; 4	8; 10	4; 6
4	(France) (Australia)	Christian Boussus; Jack Crawford	6; 2	4; 6	4; 6	6; 3	7; 9
5	(France) (Australia)	André Merlin; Vivian McGrath	6; 4	5; 7	6; 3	6; 4

Europe Zone
Semifinals

Germany
4
Rot-Weiss Tennis Club, Berlin, Germany
14–16 June 1935
Clay

Australia
1

			1	2	3	4	5
1	(Germany) (Australia)	Gottfried von Cramm; Jack Crawford	6; 3	7; 5	6; 2
2	(Germany) (Australia)	Henner Henkel; Vivian McGrath	4; 6	6; 2	6; 0	6; 2
3	(Germany) (Australia)	Hans Denker / Kay Lund; Jack Crawford / Adrian Quist	1; 6	9; 11	3; 6
4	(Germany) (Australia)	Gottfried von Cramm; Vivian McGrath	6; 3	4; 6	6; 3	4; 6	6; 2
5	(Germany) (Australia)	Henner Henkel; Jack Crawford	2; 6	6; 3	9; 7	4; 6	6; 4

=== 1936 ===
America Zone
Final

United States
2
Germantown Cricket Club, Philadelphia, PA, United States
30 May–1 June 1936
Grass

Australia
3

			1	2	3	4	5
1	(United States) (Australia)	Wilmer Allison; Adrian Quist	3; 6	7; 5	4; 6	1; 6
2	(United States) (Australia)	Don Budge; Jack Crawford	6; 2	6; 3	4; 6	1; 6	13; 11
3	(United States) (Australia)	Don Budge / Gene Mako; Jack Crawford / Adrian Quist	6; 4	6; 2	4; 6	5; 7	4; 6
4	(United States) (Australia)	Wilmer Allison; Jack Crawford	6; 4	3; 6	6; 4	2; 6	2; 6
5	(United States) (Australia)	Don Budge; Adrian Quist	6; 2	6; 2	6; 4

Inter-Zonal
Final

Australia
4
No. 1 Court, All England Club, Wimbledon, England
18–21 July 1936
Grass

Germany
1

			1	2	3	4	5
1	(Australia) (Germany)	Jack Crawford; Henner Henkel	6; 2	6; 2				retired
2	(Australia) (Germany)	Adrian Quist; Gottfried von Cramm	6; 4	4; 6	6; 4	4; 6	9; 11
3	(Australia) (Germany)	Jack Crawford / Vivian McGrath; Gottfried von Cramm / Henner Henkel	6; 4	4; 6	6; 4	6; 4
4	(Australia) (Germany)	Vivian McGrath; Henner Henkel	6; 3	5; 7	6; 4	6; 4
5	(Australia) (Germany)	Jack Crawford; Hans Denker	6; 3	6; 1	6; 4

Challenge
Round

Great Britain
3
Centre Court, All England Club, Wimbledon, England
25–28 July 1936
Grass

Australia
2

			1	2	3	4	5
1	(United Kingdom) (Australia)	Bunny Austin; Jack Crawford	4; 6	6; 3	6; 1	6; 1
2	(United Kingdom) (Australia)	Fred Perry; Adrian Quist	6; 1	4; 6	7; 5	6; 2
3	(United Kingdom) (Australia)	Pat Hughes / Raymond Tuckey; Jack Crawford / Adrian Quist	4; 6	6; 2	5; 7	8; 10
4	(United Kingdom) (Australia)	Bunny Austin; Adrian Quist	4; 6	6; 3	5; 7	2; 6
5	(United Kingdom) (Australia)	Fred Perry; Jack Crawford	6; 2	6; 3	6; 3

=== 1937 ===
America Zone
Semifinals

Mexico
0
Club Deportivo Chapultepec, Mexico City, Mexico
30 April–2 May 1937
Clay

Australia
5

			1	2	3	4	5
1	(Mexico) (Australia)	Esteban Reyes; Adrian Quist	3; 6	1; 6	3; 6
2	(Mexico) (Australia)	Ricardo Tapia; Vivian McGrath	2; 6	4; 6	4; 6
3	(Mexico) (Australia)	Daniel Hernández / Alfonso Unda; Jack Crawford / Adrian Quist	2; 6	3; 6	3; 6
4	(Mexico) (Australia)	Esteban Reyes; John Bromwich	2; 6	2; 6	5; 7
5	(Mexico) (Australia)	Ricardo Tapia; Adrian Quist	2; 6	4; 6	6; 4	3; 6

America Zone
Final

United States
5
West Side Tennis Club, Forest Hills, NY, United States
29–31 May 1937
Grass

Australia
0

			1	2	3	4	5
1	(United States) (Australia)	Don Budge; Jack Crawford	6; 1	6; 3	6; 2
2	(United States) (Australia)	Bryan Grant; John Bromwich	6; 2	7; 5	6; 1
3	(United States) (Australia)	Don Budge / Gene Mako; Jack Crawford / Vivian McGrath	7; 5	6; 1	8; 6
4	(United States) (Australia)	Don Budge; John Bromwich	6; 2	6; 3	5; 7	6; 1
5	(United States) (Australia)	Bryan Grant; Jack Crawford	6; 0	6; 2	7; 5

=== 1938 ===
America Zone
Semifinals

Australia
5
Rockhill Tennis Club, Kansas City, MO, United States
29–31 July 1938
Clay

Mexico
0

			1	2	3	4	5
1	(Australia) (Mexico)	Adrian Quist; Daniel Hernández	6; 1	7; 5	6; 4
2	(Australia) (Mexico)	John Bromwich; Eugenio Tapia	6; 4	6; 4	6; 4
3	(Australia) (Mexico)	John Bromwich / Adrian Quist; Daniel Hernández / Eugenio Tapia	6; 1	6; 0	6; 3
4	(Australia) (Mexico)	Adrian Quist; Eugenio Tapia	6; 1	6; 1	6; 4
5	(Australia) (Mexico)	Leonard Schwartz; Daniel Hernández	6; 4	6; 1	6; 2

America Zone
Final

Australia
3
Mount Royal Tennis Club, Montreal, Canada
12–14 August 1938
Grass

Japan
1

			1	2	3	4	5
1	(Australia) (Japan)	John Bromwich; Jiro Yamagishi	0; 6	6; 3	5; 7	4; 6
2	(Australia) (Japan)	Adrian Quist; Fumiteru Nakano	6; 3	4; 6	9; 7	6; 1
3	(Australia) (Japan)	John Bromwich / Adrian Quist; Fumiteru Nakano / Jiro Yamagishi	6; 2	6; 4	6; 3
4	(Australia) (Japan)	Adrian Quist; Jiro Yamagishi	6; 4	6; 4	2; 6	9; 7
5	(Australia) (Japan)	John Bromwich; Fumiteru Nakano	1; 6	6; 1	4; 6	12; 12		not completed

Inter-Zonal
Final

Australia
5
Longwood Cricket Club, Boston, MA, United States
18–20 August 1938
Grass

Germany
0

			1	2	3	4	5
1	(Australia) (Germany)	John Bromwich; Henner Henkel	6; 2	6; 3	6; 3
2	(Australia) (Germany)	Adrian Quist; Georg von Metaxa	6; 3	6; 2	6; 1
3	(Australia) (Germany)	John Bromwich / Adrian Quist; Henner Henkel / Georg von Metaxa	6; 2	6; 1	6; 4
4	(Australia) (Germany)	Adrian Quist; Henner Henkel	6; 1	6; 0	8; 6
5	(Australia) (Germany)	John Bromwich; Georg von Metaxa	6; 3	6; 2	6; 1

Challenge
Round

United States
3
Germantown Cricket Club, Philadelphia, PA, United States
3–5 September 1938
Grass

Australia
2

			1	2	3	4	5
1	(United States) (Australia)	Bobby Riggs; Adrian Quist	4; 6	6; 0	8; 6	6; 1
2	(United States) (Australia)	Don Budge; John Bromwich	6; 2	6; 3	4; 6	7; 5
3	(United States) (Australia)	Don Budge / Gene Mako; John Bromwich / Adrian Quist	6; 0	3; 6	4; 6	2; 6
4	(United States) (Australia)	Don Budge; Adrian Quist	8; 6	6; 1	6; 2
5	(United States) (Australia)	Bobby Riggs; John Bromwich	4; 6	6; 4	0; 6	2; 6

=== 1939 ===
America Zone
Quarterfinals

Mexico
0
Club Deportivo Chapultepec, Mexico City, Mexico
30 June–2 July 1939
Clay

Australia
5

			1	2	3	4	5
1	(Mexico) (Australia)	Daniel Hernández; John Bromwich	0; 6	0; 6	0; 6
2	(Mexico) (Australia)	Eugenio Tapia; Adrian Quist	1; 6	4; 6	2; 6
3	(Mexico) (Australia)	Daniel Hernández / Eugenio Tapia; John Bromwich / Adrian Quist	6; 8	0; 6	1; 6
4	(Mexico) (Australia)	Daniel Hernández; Adrian Quist	9; 11	3; 6	2; 6
5	(Mexico) (Australia)	Eugenio Tapia; John Bromwich	1; 6	3; 6	1; 6

America Zone
Semifinals

Australia
5
Long Beach Tennis Club, Long Beach, CA, United States
14–16 July 1939
Grass

Philippines
0

			1	2	3	4	5
1	(Australia) (Philippines)	Adrian Quist; Amado Sánchez	6; 1	6; 2	6; 2
2	(Australia) (Philippines)	John Bromwich; Felicisimo Ampon	8; 6	9; 7	6; 3
3	(Australia) (Philippines)	John Bromwich / Adrian Quist; Felicisimo Ampon / Amado Sánchez	7; 5	6; 4	6; 2
4	(Australia) (Philippines)	John Bromwich; Amado Sánchez	6; 1	6; 1	6; 3
5	(Australia) (Philippines)	Adrian Quist; Felicisimo Ampon	7; 5	6; 4	6; 3

America Zone
Final

Cuba
0
Seabright Lawn Tennis Club, Rumson, NJ, United States
10–12 August 1939
Grass

Australia
5

			1	2	3	4	5
1	(Cuba) (Australia)	José Agüero; John Bromwich	6; 8	0; 6	2; 6
2	(Cuba) (Australia)	Ricardo Morales; Adrian Quist	0; 6	2; 6	2; 6
3	(Cuba) (Australia)	Ricardo Morales / Lorenzo Nodarse; John Bromwich / Adrian Quist	1; 6	0; 6	3; 6
4	(Cuba) (Australia)	Ricardo Morales; John Bromwich	6; 8	6; 8	1; 6
5	(Cuba) (Australia)	José Agüero; Adrian Quist	1; 6	0; 6	0; 6

- Australia received direct entry into the Inter-Zonal Final when Americas Inter-Zonal Final opponents, Brazil, withdrew from competition.

Inter-Zonal
Final

Australia
4
Longwood Cricket Club, Boston, MA, United States
24–26 August 1939
Grass

Yugoslavia
1

			1	2	3	4	5
1	(Australia) (Kingdom of Yugoslavia)	Adrian Quist; Dragutin Mitić	6; 0	6; 4	6; 3
2	(Australia) (Kingdom of Yugoslavia)	John Bromwich; Franjo Punčec	2; 6	6; 8	6; 0	2; 6
3	(Australia) (Kingdom of Yugoslavia)	John Bromwich / Adrian Quist; Franjo Kukuljević / Franjo Punčec	6; 2	6; 3	6; 3
4	(Australia) (Kingdom of Yugoslavia)	John Bromwich; Dragutin Mitić	6; 1	6; 3	6; 2
5	(Australia) (Kingdom of Yugoslavia)	Adrian Quist; Franjo Kukuljević	6; 2	6; 3	6; 4

Challenge
Round

United States
2
Merion Cricket Club, Haverford, PA, United States
2–5 September 1939
Grass

Australia
3

			1	2	3	4	5
1	(United States) (Australia)	Bobby Riggs; John Bromwich	6; 4	6; 0	7; 5
2	(United States) (Australia)	Frank Parker; Adrian Quist	6; 3	2; 6	6; 4	1; 6	7; 5
3	(United States) (Australia)	Joe Hunt / Jack Kramer; John Bromwich / Adrian Quist	7; 5	2; 6	5; 7	2; 6
4	(United States) (Australia)	Bobby Riggs; Adrian Quist	1; 6	4; 6	6; 3	6; 3	4; 6
5	(United States) (Australia)	Frank Parker; John Bromwich	0; 6	3; 6	1; 6

== 1940s ==
=== 1946 ===
Challenge
Round

Australia
0
Kooyong Stadium, Melbourne, Australia
26–30 December 1946
Grass

United States
5

			1	2	3	4	5
1	(Australia) (United States)	John Bromwich; Ted Schroeder	6; 3	1; 6	2; 6	6; 0	3; 6
2	(Australia) (United States)	Dinny Pails; Jack Kramer	6; 8	2; 6	7; 9
3	(Australia) (United States)	John Bromwich / Adrian Quist; Jack Kramer / Ted Schroeder	2; 6	5; 7	4; 6
4	(Australia) (United States)	John Bromwich; Jack Kramer	6; 8	4; 6	4; 6
5	(Australia) (United States)	Dinny Pails; Gardnar Mulloy	3; 6	3; 6	4; 6

=== 1947 ===
America Zone
Final

Canada
0
Mount Royal Tennis Club, Montreal, Canada
8–10 August 1947
Grass

Australia
5

			1	2	3	4	5
1	(Canada) (Australia)	Henri Rochon; Dinny Pails	1; 6	4; 6	2; 6
2	(Canada) (Australia)	Brendan Macken; Geoff Brown	4; 6	4; 6	1; 6
3	(Canada) (Australia)	Edgar Lanthier / Gordon MacNeil; John Bromwich / Colin Long	2; 6	1; 6	0; 6
4	(Canada) (Australia)	Brendan Macken; Dinny Pails	4; 6	2; 6	2; 6
5	(Canada) (Australia)	Henri Rochon; Geoff Brown	3; 6	7; 9	2; 6

Inter-Zonal
Final

Australia
4
Mount Royal Tennis Club, Montreal, Canada
14–16 August 1947
Grass

Czechoslovakia
1

			1	2	3	4	5
1	(Australia) (Czechoslovakia)	John Bromwich; Vladimír Černík	6; 1	6; 1	6; 1
2	(Australia) (Czechoslovakia)	Dinny Pails; Jaroslav Drobný	3; 6	4; 6	6; 4	4; 6
3	(Australia) (Czechoslovakia)	John Bromwich / Colin Long; Vladimír Černík / Jaroslav Drobný	6; 2	6; 2	6; 2
4	(Australia) (Czechoslovakia)	John Bromwich; Jaroslav Drobný	6; 2	7; 5	6; 4
5	(Australia) (Czechoslovakia)	Dinny Pails; Vladimír Černík	6; 3	4; 6	3; 6	6; 2	6; 3

Challenge
Round

United States
4
West Side Tennis Club, Forest Hills, NY, United States
30 August–1 September 1947
Grass

Australia
1

			1	2	3	4	5
1	(United States) (Australia)	Jack Kramer; Dinny Pails	6; 2	6; 1	6; 2
2	(United States) (Australia)	Ted Schroeder; John Bromwich	6; 4	5; 7	6; 3	6; 4
3	(United States) (Australia)	Jack Kramer / Ted Schroeder; John Bromwich / Colin Long	4; 6	6; 2	2; 6	4; 6
4	(United States) (Australia)	Ted Schroeder; Dinny Pails	6; 3	8; 6	4; 6	9; 11	10; 8
5	(United States) (Australia)	Jack Kramer; John Bromwich	6; 3	6; 2	6; 2

=== 1948 ===
America Zone
Semifinals

Cuba
0
Havana, Cuba
23–25 July 1948

Australia
5

			1	2	3	4	5
1	(Cuba) (Australia)	Joffre Etcheverry; Adrian Quist	1; 6	0; 6	0; 6
2	(Cuba) (Australia)	José Agüero; Bill Sidwell	3; 6	1; 6	4; 6
3	(Cuba) (Australia)	José Agüero / Ricardo Morales; Colin Long / Bill Sidwell	5; 7	2; 6	3; 6
4	(Cuba) (Australia)	José Agüero; Adrian Quist	3; 6	4; 6	3; 6
5	(Cuba) (Australia)	Antonio Daly; Bill Sidwell	1; 6	1; 6	3; 6

America Zone
Final

Mexico
1
Centro Deportivo Chapultepec, Mexico City, Mexico
6–8 August 1948
Clay

Australia
4

			1	2	3	4	5
1	(Mexico) (Australia)	Armando Vega; Bill Sidwell	6; 2	6; 8	6; 3	4; 6	5; 7
2	(Mexico) (Australia)	Gustavo Palafox; Adrian Quist	4; 6	1; 6	4; 6
3	(Mexico) (Australia)	Gustavo Palafox / Armando Vega; Geoff Brown / Colin Long	0; 6	2; 6	2; 6
4	(Mexico) (Australia)	Armando Vega; Adrian Quist	9; 7	6; 4	6; 2
5	(Mexico) (Australia)	Francisco Guerrero Arcocha; Bill Sidwell	1; 6	4; 6	2; 6

Inter-Zonal
Final

Australia
3
Longwood Cricket Club, Boston, MA, United States
19–22 August 1948
Grass

Czechoslovakia
2

			1	2	3	4	5
1	(Australia) (Czechoslovakia)	Adrian Quist; Vladimír Černík	6; 2	13; 11	6; 0
2	(Australia) (Czechoslovakia)	Bill Sidwell; Jaroslav Drobný	6; 3	6; 2	9; 11	14; 12
3	(Australia) (Czechoslovakia)	Geoff Brown / Colin Long; Vladimír Černík / Jaroslav Drobný	8; 10	6; 4	3; 6	4; 6
4	(Australia) (Czechoslovakia)	Adrian Quist; Jaroslav Drobný	8; 6	6; 3	16; 18	3; 6	5; 7
5	(Australia) (Czechoslovakia)	Bill Sidwell; Vladimír Černík	7; 5	6; 4	6; 2

Challenge
Round

United States
5
West Side Tennis Club, Forest Hills, NY, United States
4–6 September 1948
Grass

Australia
0

			1	2	3	4	5
1	(United States) (Australia)	Frank Parker; Bill Sidwell	6; 4	6; 4	6; 4
2	(United States) (Australia)	Ted Schroeder; Adrian Quist	6; 3	4; 6	6; 0	6; 0
3	(United States) (Australia)	Gardnar Mulloy / Bill Talbert; Colin Long / Bill Sidwell	8; 6	9; 7	2; 6	7; 5
4	(United States) (Australia)	Ted Schroeder; Bill Sidwell	6; 2	6; 1	6; 1
5	(United States) (Australia)	Frank Parker; Adrian Quist	6; 2	6; 2	6; 3

=== 1949 ===
America Zone
Semifinals

Canada
1
Mount Royal Tennis Club Montreal, Canada
21–23 July 1949
Grass

Australia
4

			1	2	3	4	5
1	(Canada) (Australia)	Brendan Macken; Bill Sidwell	3; 6	7; 5	6; 3	5; 7	8; 6
2	(Canada) (Australia)	Henri Rochon; Frank Sedgman	4; 6	2; 6	2; 6
3	(Canada) (Australia)	Brendan Macken / Walter Stohlberg; John Bromwich / Frank Sedgman	3; 6	2; 6	2; 6
4	(Canada) (Australia)	Brendan Macken; Frank Sedgman	2; 6	2; 6	0; 6
5	(Canada) (Australia)	Lorne Main; Bill Sidwell	6; 8	6; 4	4; 6	1; 6

America Zone
Final

Australia
5
Wilmington Country Club, Wilmington, DE, United States
29–31 July 1949
Grass

Mexico
0

			1	2	3	4	5
1	(Australia) (Mexico)	Frank Sedgman; Armando Vega	12; 10	4; 6	6; 4	1; 6	6; 3
2	(Australia) (Mexico)	John Bromwich; Rolando Vega	6; 0	6; 2	6; 1
3	(Australia) (Mexico)	John Bromwich / Frank Sedgman; Armando Vega / Rolando Vega	6; 0	6; 4	6; 2
4	(Australia) (Mexico)	John Bromwich; Armando Vega	6; 0	6; 1	6; 4
5	(Australia) (Mexico)	Bill Sidwell; Miguel Ángel Reyes-Varela	6; 2	6; 2	6; 1

Inter-Zonal
Final

Australia
5
Westchester Country Club, Rye, NY, United States
12–15 August 1949
Grass

Italy
0

			1	2	3	4	5
1	(Australia) (Italy)	Bill Sidwell; Giovanni Cucelli	6; 2	6; 4	2; 6	6; 2
2	(Australia) (Italy)	Frank Sedgman; Marcello del Bello	6; 0	6; 4	6; 4
3	(Australia) (Italy)	John Bromwich / Frank Sedgman; Marcello del Bello / Giovanni Cucelli	2; 6	6; 2	6; 2	6; 1
4	(Australia) (Italy)	Bill Sidwell; Marcello del Bello	6; 1	6; 1	6; 0
5	(Australia) (Italy)	Frank Sedgman; Giovanni Cucelli	1; 6	6; 1	6; 2	6; 2

Challenge
Round

United States
4
West Side Tennis Club, Forest Hills, NY, United States
26–28 August 1949
Grass

Australia
1

			1	2	3	4	5
1	(United States) (Australia)	Ted Schroeder; Bill Sidwell	6; 1	5; 7	4; 6	6; 2	6; 3
2	(United States) (Australia)	Pancho Gonzales; Frank Sedgman	8; 6	6; 4	9; 7
3	(United States) (Australia)	Gardnar Mulloy / Bill Talbert; John Bromwich / Bill Sidwell	6; 3	6; 4	8; 10	7; 9	7; 9
4	(United States) (Australia)	Ted Schroeder; Frank Sedgman	6; 4	6; 3	6; 3
5	(United States) (Australia)	Pancho Gonzales; Bill Sidwell	6; 1	6; 3	6; 3

== See also ==
- Australia Davis Cup team results (1950–1979)
- Australia Davis Cup team results (1980–2009)
- Australia Davis Cup team results (2010–current)
