= 1925 International Lawn Tennis Challenge America Zone =

International tennis competition

The America Zone was one of the two regional zones of the 1925 International Lawn Tennis Challenge.

9 teams entered the America Zone, with the winner going on to compete in the Inter-Zonal Final against the winner of the Europe Zone. Australia defeated Japan in the final, and went on to face France in the Inter-Zonal Final.

== Draw ==
First Round; 4–6 July
Havana, Cuba (clay)
Spain	5
Cuba	0

Quarterfinals; 16–19 July

Semifinals; 13–15 August

Final; 20–22 August

== First round ==
=== Cuba vs. Spain ===
Cuba
0
Vedado Tennis Club, Havana, Cuba
4–6 July 1925
Clay

Spain
5

			1	2	3	4	5
1	(Cuba) (Spain)	Vicente Banet; Manuel Alonso Areizaga	4; 6	1; 6	1; 6
2	(Cuba) (Spain)	Rogelio Paris; Eduardo Flaquer	3; 6	3; 6	2; 6
3	(Cuba) (Spain)	Raúl Chacón / Rogelio Paris; José María Alonso Areizaga / Manuel Alonso Areizaga	6; 8	4; 6	6; 8
4	(Cuba) (Spain)	Rogelio Paris; Manuel Alonso Areizaga	1; 6	0; 6	3; 6
5	(Cuba) (Spain)	Vicente Banet; Eduardo Flaquer	1; 6	0; 6	0; 6

== Quarterfinals ==
=== Mexico vs. Spain ===
Mexico
0
Club Tenis Reforma, Mazatlán, Mexico
16–19 July 1925
Clay

Spain
5

			1	2	3	4	5
1	(Mexico) (Spain)	Ignacio de la Borbolla; Eduardo Flaquer	2; 6	4; 6	4; 6
2	(Mexico) (Spain)	Claude Butlin; Manuel Alonso Areizaga	2; 6	1; 6	2; 6
3	(Mexico) (Spain)	Claude Butlin / Ignacio de la Borbolla; José María Alonso Areizaga / Manuel Alonso Areizaga	4; 6	2; 6	5; 7
4	(Mexico) (Spain)	Claude Butlin; Eduardo Flaquer	12; 10	4; 6	1; 6	5; 7
5	(Mexico) (Spain)	Ignacio de la Borbolla; Manuel Alonso Areizaga	4; 6	4; 6	2; 6

== Semifinals ==
=== Canada vs. Australia ===
Canada
0
Mount Royal Tennis Club, Montreal, Canada
13–15 August 1925
Grass

Australia
5

			1	2	3	4	5
1	(Canada) (Australia)	Willard Crocker; James Anderson	1; 6	3; 6	2; 6
2	(Canada) (Australia)	Jack Wright; Gerald Patterson	7; 5	6; 3	3; 6	1; 6	3; 6
3	(Canada) (Australia)	Willard Crocker / Jack Wright; John Hawkes / Gerald Patterson	0; 6	2; 6	4; 6
4	(Canada) (Australia)	Jack Wright; James Anderson	2; 6	4; 6	1; 6
5	(Canada) (Australia)	Willard Crocker; Gerald Patterson	4; 6	9; 11	4; 6

=== Japan vs. Spain ===
Japan
3
Baltimore Country Club, Baltimore, MD, United States
13–15 August 1925
Grass

Spain
2

			1	2	3	4	5
1	(Japan) (Spain)	Takeichi Harada; Eduardo Flaquer	6; 2	6; 4	6; 0
2	(Japan) (Spain)	Zenzo Shimizu; Manuel Alonso Areizaga	5; 7	0; 6	6; 3	3; 6
3	(Japan) (Spain)	Takeichi Harada / Zenzo Shimizu; José María Alonso Areizaga / Manuel Alonso Areizaga	6; 2	6; 3	2; 6	8; 10	6; 3
4	(Japan) (Spain)	Takeichi Harada; Manuel Alonso Areizaga	2; 6	6; 4	6; 3	6; 4
5	(Japan) (Spain)	Zenzo Shimizu; Eduardo Flaquer	6; 3	0; 6	3; 6	4; 6

== Final ==
=== Australia vs. Japan ===
Australia
4
Longwood Cricket Club, Boston, MA, United States
20–22 August 1925
Grass

Japan
1

			1	2	3	4	5
1	(Australia) (Japan)	Gerald Patterson; Zenzo Shimizu	6; 1	6; 4	6; 2
2	(Australia) (Japan)	James Anderson; Takeichi Harada	6; 4	3; 6	6; 3	6; 1
3	(Australia) (Japan)	John Hawkes / Gerald Patterson; Takeichi Harada / Zenzo Shimizu	6; 1	6; 2	9; 7
4	(Australia) (Japan)	Gerald Patterson; Takeichi Harada	2; 6	6; 3	1; 6	5; 7
5	(Australia) (Japan)	John Hawkes; Masanosuke Fukuda	6; 1	6; 3	6; 0
