= 1924 International Lawn Tennis Challenge America Zone =

International tennis competition

The America Zone was one of the two regional zones of the 1924 International Lawn Tennis Challenge.

6 teams entered the America Zone, with the winner going on to compete in the Inter-Zonal Final against the winner of the Europe Zone. Australia defeated Japan in the final, and went on to face France in the Inter-Zonal Final.

== Draw ==
Quarterfinals; 24 July–1 August
Mexico
bye
Brooklyn, NY, United States (grass)
China | 0
Australia | 5
Ottawa, Canada (clay)
Canada | 3
Cuba | 2
bye
Japan

Semifinals; 7–10 August
Baltimore, MD, United States (grass)
Mexico | 0
Australia | 5
Montreal, Canada (grass)
Canada | 1
Japan | 4

Final; 14–16 August
Providence, RI, United States (grass)
Australia | 5
Japan | 0

== Quarterfinals ==
=== Australia vs. China ===
Australia
5
Crescent Athletic Club, Brooklyn, NY, United States
31 July–1 August 1924
Grass

China
0

| | | | 1 | 2 | 3 | 4 | 5 |
|---|---|---|---|---|---|---|---|
| 1 | (Australia) (China) | Gerald Patterson; Wei Wing Lock | 6; 1 | 6; 2 | 6; 2 |
| 2 | (Australia) (China) | Pat O'Hara Wood; Paul Kong | 6; 0 | 6; 1 | 6; 2 |
| 3 | (Australia) (China) | Pat O'Hara Wood / Gerald Patterson; Huang Ching / Wei Wing Lock | 6; 1 | 6; 2 | 6; 0 |
| 4 | (Australia) (China) | Gerald Patterson; Paul Kong | 6; 0 | 6; 0 | 6; 2 |
| 5 | (Australia) (China) | Pat O'Hara Wood; Wei Wing Lock | 6; 0 | 6; 0 | 6; 2 |

=== Canada vs. Cuba ===
Canada
3
Ottawa, Canada
24–26 July 1924
Clay

Cuba
2

| | | | 1 | 2 | 3 | 4 | 5 |
|---|---|---|---|---|---|---|---|
| 1 | (Canada) (Cuba) | Jack Wright; Rogelio Paris | 8; 10 | 6; 3 | 6; 2 | 0; 6 | 3; 6 |
| 2 | (Canada) (Cuba) | Willard Crocker; Ignacio Zayas | 6; 1 | 6; 2 | 6; 2 |
| 3 | (Canada) (Cuba) | Willard Crocker / Jack Wright; Vicente Banet / Guillermo Sanchez-Villalba | 7; 5 | 7; 5 | 6; 2 |
| 4 | (Canada) (Cuba) | Jack Wright; Vicente Banet | 6; 4 | 4; 6 | 0; 6 | 6; 3 | 4; 6 |
| 5 | (Canada) (Cuba) | Willard Crocker; Rogelio Paris | 6; 3 | 7; 5 | 6; 3 |

== Semifinals ==
=== Australia vs. Mexico ===
Australia
5
Baltimore Country Club, Baltimore, MD, United States
7–9 August 1924
Grass

Mexico
0

| | | | 1 | 2 | 3 | 4 | 5 |
|---|---|---|---|---|---|---|---|
| 1 | (Australia) (Mexico) | Gerald Patterson; Manuel Llano | 6; 0 | 6; 1 | 6; 2 |
| 2 | (Australia) (Mexico) | Pat O'Hara Wood; Ignacio de la Borbolla | 6; 3 | 6; 0 | 9; 7 |
| 3 | (Australia) (Mexico) | Pat O'Hara Wood / Gerald Patterson; Ignacio de la Borbolla / Francisco Gerdes | 6; 4 | 6; 4 | 6; 0 |
| 4 | (Australia) (Mexico) | Gerald Patterson; Ignacio de la Borbolla | 6; 2 | 6; 2 | 6; 1 |
| 5 | (Australia) (Mexico) | Pat O'Hara Wood; Francisco Gerdes | 6; 1 | 6; 2 | 6; 1 |

=== Canada vs. Japan ===
Canada
1
Mount Royal Tennis Club, Montreal, Canada
7–10 August 1924
Grass

Japan
4

| | | | 1 | 2 | 3 | 4 | 5 |
|---|---|---|---|---|---|---|---|
| 1 | (Canada) (Japan) | Jack Wright; Sunao Okamoto | 6; 8 | 4; 6 | 5; 7 |
| 2 | (Canada) (Japan) | Willard Crocker; Zenzo Shimizu | 6; 4 | 5; 7 | 4; 6 | 6; 0 | 1; 6 |
| 3 | (Canada) (Japan) | Willard Crocker / Jack Wright; Takeichi Harada / Sunao Okamoto | 7; 5 | 6; 4 | 6; 3 |
| 4 | (Canada) (Japan) | Willard Crocker; Sunao Okamoto | 2; 6 | 7; 9 | 6; 4 | 2; 6 |
| 5 | (Canada) (Japan) | Jack Wright; Zenzo Shimizu | 6; 4 | 3; 6 | 4; 6 | 0; 6 |

== Final ==
=== Australia vs. Japan ===
Australia
5
Agawam Hunt Club, Providence, RI, United States
14–16 August 1924
Grass

Japan
0

| | | | 1 | 2 | 3 | 4 | 5 |
|---|---|---|---|---|---|---|---|
| 1 | (Australia) (Japan) | Gerald Patterson; Zenzo Shimizu | 7; 5 | 11; 9 | 6; 4 |
| 2 | (Australia) (Japan) | Pat O'Hara Wood; Sunao Okamoto | 6; 4 | 2; 6 | 6; 4 | 2; 6 | 6; 1 |
| 3 | (Australia) (Japan) | Pat O'Hara Wood / Gerald Patterson; Takeichi Harada / Sunao Okamoto | 7; 5 | 6; 2 | 6; 4 |
| 4 | (Australia) (Japan) | Gerald Patterson; Sunao Okamoto | 7; 5 | 6; 1 | 6; 4 |
| 5 | (Australia) (Japan) | Pat O'Hara Wood; Zenzo Shimizu | 6; 4 | 6; 4 | 6; 2 |
