= 1938 International Lawn Tennis Challenge America Zone =

The America Zone was one of the two regional zones of the 1938 International Lawn Tennis Challenge.

4 teams entered the America Zone, with the winner going on to compete in the Inter-Zonal Final against the winner of the Europe Zone. Australia defeated Japan in the final, and went on to face Germany in the Inter-Zonal Final.

== Draw ==
Semifinals; 28–31 July
Kansas City, MO, United States (clay)
Australia | 5
Mexico | 0
Montreal, Canada (grass)
Canada | 0
Japan | 5

Final; 12–14 August
Montreal, Canada (grass)
Australia | 3
Japan | 1

== Semifinals ==
=== Australia vs. Mexico ===
Australia
5
Rockhill Tennis Club, Kansas City, MO, United States
29–31 July 1938
Clay

Mexico
0

| | | | 1 | 2 | 3 | 4 | 5 |
|---|---|---|---|---|---|---|---|
| 1 | (Australia) (Mexico) | Adrian Quist; Daniel Hernández | 6; 1 | 7; 5 | 6; 4 |
| 2 | (Australia) (Mexico) | John Bromwich; Eugenio Tapia | 6; 4 | 6; 4 | 6; 4 |
| 3 | (Australia) (Mexico) | John Bromwich / Adrian Quist; Daniel Hernández / Eugenio Tapia | 6; 1 | 6; 0 | 6; 3 |
| 4 | (Australia) (Mexico) | Adrian Quist; Eugenio Tapia | 6; 1 | 6; 1 | 6; 4 |
| 5 | (Australia) (Mexico) | Leonard Schwartz; Daniel Hernández | 6; 4 | 6; 1 | 6; 2 |

=== Canada vs. Japan ===
Canada
0
Mount Royal Tennis Club, Montreal, Canada
28–30 July 1938
Grass

Japan
5

| | | | 1 | 2 | 3 | 4 | 5 |
|---|---|---|---|---|---|---|---|
| 1 | (Canada) (Japan) | Ross Wilson; Fumiteru Nakano | 2; 6 | 3; 6 | 2; 6 |
| 2 | (Canada) (Japan) | Bob Murray; Jiro Yamagishi | 1; 6 | 3; 6 | 3; 6 |
| 3 | (Canada) (Japan) | Laird Watt / Ross Wilson; Fumiteru Nakano / Jiro Yamagishi | 3; 6 | 6; 3 | 3; 6 | 5; 7 |
| 4 | (Canada) (Japan) | Douglas Cameron; Jiro Yamagishi | 4; 6 | 1; 6 | 0; 6 |
| 5 | (Canada) (Japan) | Bob Murray; Fumiteru Nakano | 4; 6 | 3; 6 | 0; 6 |

== Final ==
=== Australia vs. Japan ===
Australia
3
Mount Royal Tennis Club, Montreal, Canada
12–14 August 1938
Grass

Japan
1

| | | | 1 | 2 | 3 | 4 | 5 |
|---|---|---|---|---|---|---|---|---|
| 1 | (Australia) (Japan) | John Bromwich; Jiro Yamagishi | 0; 6 | 6; 3 | 5; 7 | 4; 6 |
| 2 | (Australia) (Japan) | Adrian Quist; Fumiteru Nakano | 6; 3 | 4; 6 | 9; 7 | 6; 1 |
| 3 | (Australia) (Japan) | John Bromwich / Adrian Quist; Fumiteru Nakano / Jiro Yamagishi | 6; 2 | 6; 4 | 6; 3 |
| 4 | (Australia) (Japan) | Adrian Quist; Jiro Yamagishi | 6; 4 | 6; 4 | 2; 6 | 9; 7 |
| 5 | (Australia) (Japan) | John Bromwich; Fumiteru Nakano | 1; 6 | 6; 1 | 4; 6 | 12; 12 | | not completed |
