= 1937 International Lawn Tennis Challenge America Zone =

The America Zone was one of the two regional zones of the 1937 International Lawn Tennis Challenge.

4 teams entered the America Zone, with the winner going on to compete in the Inter-Zonal Final against the winner of the Europe Zone. The United States defeated Australia in the final, and went on to face Germany in the Inter-Zonal Final.

== Draw ==
Semifinals; 30 April–2 May
Mexico City, Mexico (clay)
Australia	5
Mexico	0
San Francisco, CA, United States (clay)
United States	5
Japan	0

Final; 29–31 May
Forest Hills, NY, United States (grass)
Australia	0
United States	5

== Semifinals ==
=== Mexico vs. Australia ===
Mexico
0
Club Deportivo Chapultepec, Mexico City, Mexico
30 April–2 May 1937
Clay

Australia
5

			1	2	3	4	5
1	(Mexico) (Australia)	Esteban Reyes; Adrian Quist	3; 6	1; 6	3; 6
2	(Mexico) (Australia)	Ricardo Tapia; Vivian McGrath	2; 6	4; 6	4; 6
3	(Mexico) (Australia)	Daniel Hernández / Alfonso Unda; Jack Crawford / Adrian Quist	2; 6	3; 6	3; 6
4	(Mexico) (Australia)	Esteban Reyes; John Bromwich	2; 6	2; 6	5; 7
5	(Mexico) (Australia)	Ricardo Tapia; Adrian Quist	2; 6	4; 6	6; 4	3; 6

=== United States vs. Japan ===
United States
5
Lakeside Country Club, San Francisco, CA, United States
30 April–2 May 1937
Clay

Japan
0

			1	2	3	4	5
1	(United States) (Japan)	Don Budge; Fumiteru Nakano	6; 1	6; 1	6; 0
2	(United States) (Japan)	Frank Parker; Jiro Yamagishi	6; 3	2; 6	8; 6	6; 1
3	(United States) (Japan)	Don Budge / Gene Mako; Fumiteru Nakano / Jiro Yamagishi	6; 0	6; 1	6; 4
4	(United States) (Japan)	Frank Parker; Fumiteru Nakano	6; 0	6; 3	6; 2
5	(United States) (Japan)	Don Budge; Jiro Yamagishi	6; 2	6; 2	6; 4

== Final ==
=== United States vs. Australia ===
United States
5
West Side Tennis Club, Forest Hills, NY, United States
29–31 May 1937
Grass

Australia
0

			1	2	3	4	5
1	(United States) (Australia)	Don Budge; Jack Crawford	6; 1	6; 3	6; 2
2	(United States) (Australia)	Bryan Grant; John Bromwich	6; 2	7; 5	6; 1
3	(United States) (Australia)	Don Budge / Gene Mako; Jack Crawford / Vivian McGrath	7; 5	6; 1	8; 6
4	(United States) (Australia)	Don Budge; John Bromwich	6; 2	6; 3	5; 7	6; 1
5	(United States) (Australia)	Bryan Grant; Jack Crawford	6; 0	6; 2	7; 5
