= 1951 Davis Cup America Zone =

International tennis competition

The America Zone was one of the two regional zones of the 1951 Davis Cup.

5 teams entered the America Zone, with the winner going on to compete in the Inter-Zonal Final against the winner of the Europe Zone. The United States defeated Canada in the final, and went on to face Sweden in the Inter-Zonal Final.

== Draw ==
Quarterfinals; 20–22 July
Louisville, KY, United States (grass)
Japan	0
United States	5
Mexico
bye
bye
Cuba
bye
Canada

Semifinals; 3–5 August
Rye, NY, United States (grass)
United States	5
Mexico	0
Montreal, Canada (grass)
Cuba	0
Canada	5

Final; 10–12 August
Montreal, Canada (grass)
United States	5
Canada	0

== Quarterfinals ==
=== United States vs. Japan ===
United States
5
Louisville Boat Club, Louisville, KY, United States
20–22 July 1951
Grass

Japan
0

			1	2	3	4	5
1	(United States) (Japan)	Dick Savitt; Fumiteru Nakano	7; 5	6; 3	6; 2
2	(United States) (Japan)	Herbie Flam; Jiro Kumamaru	7; 5	6; 0	7; 5
3	(United States) (Japan)	Bill Talbert / Tony Trabert; Goro Fujikura / Fumiteru Nakano	6; 0	6; 2	10; 8
4	(United States) (Japan)	Tony Trabert; Fumiteru Nakano	6; 4	7; 5	6; 0
5	(United States) (Japan)	Dick Savitt; Jiro Kumamaru	6; 4	6; 2	3; 6	6; 1

== Semifinals ==
=== United States vs. Mexico ===
United States
5
Westchester Country Club, Rye, NY, United States
3–5 August 1951
Grass

Mexico
0

			1	2	3	4	5
1	(United States) (Mexico)	Art Larsen; Armando Vega	7; 5	6; 3	4; 6	7; 5
2	(United States) (Mexico)	Herbie Flam; Mario Llamas	6; 1	6; 2	6; 4
3	(United States) (Mexico)	Herbie Flam / Vic Seixas; Armando Vega / Rolando Vega	6; 4	6; 2	6; 0
4	(United States) (Mexico)	Herbie Flam; Rolando Vega	6; 3	6; 3	6; 3
5	(United States) (Mexico)	Vic Seixas; Mario Llamas	6; 3	8; 6	6; 1

=== Canada vs. Cuba ===
Canada
5
Mount Royal Tennis Club, Montreal, Canada
3–5 August 1951
Grass

Cuba
0

			1	2	3	4	5
1	(Canada) (Cuba)	Lorne Main; José Agüero	6; 4	6; 0	7; 5
2	(Canada) (Cuba)	Brendan Macken; Juan Weiss	3; 6	6; 4	6; 1	6; 4
3	(Canada) (Cuba)	Lorne Main / Henri Rochon; José Agüero / Juan Weiss	6; 4	6; 0	6; 4
4	(Canada) (Cuba)	Henri Rochon; Orlando Garrido	6; 1	6; 3	6; 2
5	(Canada) (Cuba)	Brendan Macken; Reynaldo Garrido	6; 2	6; 4	6; 2

== Final ==
=== Canada vs. United States ===
Canada
0
Mount Royal Tennis Club, Montreal, Canada
10–12 August 1951
Grass

United States
5

			1	2	3	4	5
1	(Canada) (United States)	Lorne Main; Tony Trabert	1; 6	2; 6	3; 6
2	(Canada) (United States)	Brendan Macken; Dick Savitt	3; 6	1; 6	3; 6
3	(Canada) (United States)	Brendan Macken / Henri Rochon; Budge Patty / Tony Trabert	4; 6	3; 6	2; 6
4	(Canada) (United States)	Henri Rochon; Art Larsen	2; 6	1; 6	3; 6
5	(Canada) (United States)	Lorne Main; Budge Patty	3; 6	3; 6	2; 6
