= 1939 International Lawn Tennis Challenge America Zone =

International tennis competition

The America Zone was one of the two regional zones of the 1939 International Lawn Tennis Challenge.

7 teams entered the America Zone: 6 teams entered the North & Central America Zone, while 1 team entered the South America Zone. The winner of each sub-zone would play against each other to determine who moved to the Inter-Zonal Final to compete against the winner of the Europe Zone.

Australia defeated Cuba in the North & Central America Zone final, and then received a walkover in the Americas Inter-Zonal final after Brazil, the only team in the South America Zone, withdrew. Australia went on to face Yugoslavia in the Inter-Zonal Final.

== North & Central America Zone ==
=== Draw ===
Quarterfinals; 30 June–23 July
Philippines
bye
Mexico City, Mexico (clay)
Australia	5
Mexico	0
Havana, Cuba (clay)
Canada	1
Cuba	4
bye
Japan

Semifinals; 14–16 July
Long Beach, CA, United States (grass)
Philippines	0
Australia	5
Cuba	w/o
Japan (Note: Japan withdrew from the competition after their top player, Jiro Yamagishi, joined the Imperial Japanese Navy.)

Final; 10–12 August
Rumson, NJ, United States (grass)
Australia	5
Cuba	0

=== Quarterfinals ===
==== Mexico vs. Australia ====
Mexico
0
Club Deportivo Chapultepec, Mexico City, Mexico
30 June–2 July 1939
Clay

Australia
5

			1	2	3	4	5
1	(Mexico) (Australia)	Daniel Hernández; John Bromwich	0; 6	0; 6	0; 6
2	(Mexico) (Australia)	Eugenio Tapia; Adrian Quist	1; 6	4; 6	2; 6
3	(Mexico) (Australia)	Daniel Hernández / Eugenio Tapia; John Bromwich / Adrian Quist	6; 8	0; 6	1; 6
4	(Mexico) (Australia)	Daniel Hernández; Adrian Quist	9; 11	3; 6	2; 6
5	(Mexico) (Australia)	Eugenio Tapia; John Bromwich	1; 6	3; 6	1; 6

==== Cuba vs. Canada ====
Cuba
4
Hotel Nacional, Havana, Cuba
21–23 July 1939
Clay

Canada
1

			1	2	3	4	5
1	(Cuba) (Canada)	Ricardo Morales; Bruce Hall	6; 1	6; 2	6; 2
2	(Cuba) (Canada)	José Agüero; Ellis Tarshis	5; 7	7; 5	3; 6	4; 6
3	(Cuba) (Canada)	Ricardo Morales / Lorenzo Nodarse; Philip Pearson / William Pedlar	9; 7	4; 6	6; 4	4; 6	6; 1
4	(Cuba) (Canada)	Ricardo Morales; Ellis Tarshis	6; 2	6; 4	3; 6	0; 6	6; 4
5	(Cuba) (Canada)	José Agüero; Bruce Hall	4; 6	6; 4	6; 0	6; 4

=== Semifinals ===
==== Australia vs. Philippines ====
Australia
5
Long Beach Tennis Club, Long Beach, CA, United States
14–16 July 1939
Grass

Philippines
0

			1	2	3	4	5
1	(Australia) (Philippines)	Adrian Quist; Amado Sánchez	6; 1	6; 2	6; 2
2	(Australia) (Philippines)	John Bromwich; Felicisimo Ampon	8; 6	9; 7	6; 3
3	(Australia) (Philippines)	John Bromwich / Adrian Quist; Felicisimo Ampon / Amado Sánchez	7; 5	6; 4	6; 2
4	(Australia) (Philippines)	John Bromwich; Amado Sánchez	6; 1	6; 1	6; 3
5	(Australia) (Philippines)	Adrian Quist; Felicisimo Ampon	7; 5	6; 4	6; 3

=== Final ===
==== Cuba vs. Australia ====
Cuba
0
Seabright Lawn Tennis Club, Rumson, NJ, United States
10–12 August 1939
Grass

Australia
5

			1	2	3	4	5
1	(Cuba) (Australia)	José Agüero; John Bromwich	6; 8	0; 6	2; 6
2	(Cuba) (Australia)	Ricardo Morales; Adrian Quist	0; 6	2; 6	2; 6
3	(Cuba) (Australia)	Ricardo Morales / Lorenzo Nodarse; John Bromwich / Adrian Quist	1; 6	0; 6	3; 6
4	(Cuba) (Australia)	Ricardo Morales; John Bromwich	6; 8	6; 8	1; 6
5	(Cuba) (Australia)	José Agüero; Adrian Quist	1; 6	0; 6	0; 6

== Americas Inter-Zonal Final ==
Australia defeated Brazil by walkover.
