= 1932 International Lawn Tennis Challenge America Zone =

Sporting event

The America Zone was one of the two regional zones of the 1932 International Lawn Tennis Challenge.

8 teams entered the America Zone: 5 teams competed in the North & Central America Zone, while 3 teams competed in the South America Zone. The winner of each sub-zone would play against each other to determine who moved to the Inter-Zonal Final to compete against the winner of the Europe Zone.

The United States defeated Australia in the North & Central America Zone final, and Brazil, as the only competing team in the South America Zone, received a walkover. In the Americas Inter-Zonal Final, the United States defeated Brazil and went on to face Germany in the Inter-Zonal Final.

== North & Central America Zone ==
Quarterfinals; 28–30 April
Chevy Chase, MD, United States (clay)
United States	5
Canada	0
Mexico
bye
bye
Australia
bye
Cuba

Semifinals; 13–15 May
New Orleans, LA, United States (clay)
United States	5
Mexico	0
Havana, Cuba
Australia	5
Cuba	0

Final; 27–30 May
Philadelphia, PA, United States (clay)
United States	5
Australia	0

=== Quarterfinals ===
==== United States vs. Canada ====
United States
5
Chevy Chase Lawn Tennis Club, Chevy Chase, MD, United States
28–30 April 1932
Clay

Canada
0

			1	2	3	4	5
1	(United States) (Canada)	Wilmer Allison; Marcel Rainville	6; 2	6; 4	6; 2
2	(United States) (Canada)	Ellsworth Vines; Jack Wright	8; 6	3; 6	6; 4	4; 6	6; 2
3	(United States) (Canada)	Wilmer Allison / John Van Ryn; Marcel Rainville / Jack Wright	6; 2	6; 1	6; 2
4	(United States) (Canada)	Frank Shields; Jack Wright	8; 6	6; 1	8; 10	6; 1
5	(United States) (Canada)	Ellsworth Vines; Marcel Rainville	6; 3	6; 3	6; 4

=== Semifinals ===
==== United States vs. Mexico ====
United States
5
New Orleans Country Club, New Orleans, LA, United States
13–15 May 1932
Clay

Mexico
0

			1	2	3	4	5
1	(United States) (Mexico)	Ellsworth Vines; Alfonso Unda	6; 1	6; 2	6; 4
2	(United States) (Mexico)	Wilmer Allison; Ricardo Tapia	6; 2	6; 3	6; 4
3	(United States) (Mexico)	Wilmer Allison / John Van Ryn; Ricardo Tapia / Alfonso Unda	6; 1	6; 2	3; 6	9; 7
4	(United States) (Mexico)	Ellsworth Vines; Ricardo Tapia	6; 4	5; 7	10; 12	8; 6	6; 3
5	(United States) (Mexico)	Frank Shields; Eduardo Mestre	6; 0	6; 1	6; 0

==== Cuba vs. Australia ====
Cuba
0
Ferroviario Tennis Club, Havana, Cuba
13–15 May 1932

Australia
5

			1	2	3	4	5
1	(Cuba) (Australia)	Ricardo Morales; Jack Crawford	3; 6	1; 6	5; 7
2	(Cuba) (Australia)	Gustavo Vollmer; Harry Hopman	2; 6	1; 6	6; 4	1; 6
3	(Cuba) (Australia)	Ricardo Morales / Gustavo Vollmer; Jack Crawford / Harry Hopman	6; 4	4; 6	6; 8	4; 6
4	(Cuba) (Australia)	Ricardo Morales; Harry Hopman	2; 6	2; 6	4; 6
5	(Cuba) (Australia)	Gustavo Vollmer; Clifford Sproule	1; 6	1; 6	4; 6

=== Final ===
==== United States vs. Australia ====
United States
5
Philadelphia Country Club, Philadelphia, PA, United States
27–30 May 1932
Clay

Australia
0

			1	2	3	4	5
1	(United States) (Australia)	Frank Shields; Harry Hopman	6; 4	6; 1	6; 2
2	(United States) (Australia)	Ellsworth Vines; Jack Crawford	6; 2	6; 4	2; 6	6; 4
3	(United States) (Australia)	Wilmer Allison / John Van Ryn; Jack Crawford / Harry Hopman	6; 0	6; 4	5; 7	7; 5
4	(United States) (Australia)	Frank Shields; Jack Crawford	6; 4	7; 5	4; 6	3; 6	6; 2
5	(United States) (Australia)	Ellsworth Vines; Harry Hopman	6; 2	9; 11	6; 4	6; 4

== South America Zone ==
Semifinals
Brazil	w/o
Chile
bye
Paraguay

Final
Brazil	w/o
Paraguay

== Americas Inter-Zonal Final ==
=== United States vs. Brazil ===
United States
5
West Side Tennis Club, Forest Hills, NY, United States
9–11 June 1932
Clay

Brazil
0

			1	2	3	4	5
1	(United States) (Brazil)	Wilmer Allison; Nelson Cruz	6; 3	6; 2	6; 3
2	(United States) (Brazil)	Frank Shields; Ricardo Pernambuco	6; 1	6; 3	0; 6	6; 4
3	(United States) (Brazil)	Wilmer Allison / John Van Ryn; Ricardo Pernambuco / Ultimo Simone	6; 1	6; 1	6; 2
4	(United States) (Brazil)	Wilmer Allison; Ricardo Pernambuco	6; 1	6; 2	6; 0
5	(United States) (Brazil)	John Van Ryn; Ultimo Simone	6; 2	6; 0	6; 0
