= 1948 Davis Cup America Zone =

International tennis competition

The America Zone was one of the two regional zones of the 1948 Davis Cup.

4 teams entered the America Zone, with the winner going on to compete in the Inter-Zonal Final against the winner of the Europe Zone. Australia defeated Mexico in the final, and went on to face Czechoslovakia in the Inter-Zonal Final.

== Draw ==
Semifinals; 8–25 July
Havana, Cuba
Australia | 5
Cuba | 0
Montreal, Canada (grass)
Canada | 1
Mexico | 4

Final; 6–8 August
Mexico City, Mexico (clay)
Australia | 4
Mexico | 1

== Semifinals ==
=== Cuba vs. Australia ===
Cuba
0
Havana, Cuba
23–25 July 1948

Australia
5

| | | | 1 | 2 | 3 | 4 | 5 |
|---|---|---|---|---|---|---|---|
| 1 | (Cuba) (Australia) | Joffre Etcheverry; Adrian Quist | 1; 6 | 0; 6 | 0; 6 |
| 2 | (Cuba) (Australia) | José Agüero; Bill Sidwell | 3; 6 | 1; 6 | 4; 6 |
| 3 | (Cuba) (Australia) | José Agüero / Ricardo Morales; Colin Long / Bill Sidwell | 5; 7 | 2; 6 | 3; 6 |
| 4 | (Cuba) (Australia) | José Agüero; Adrian Quist | 3; 6 | 4; 6 | 3; 6 |
| 5 | (Cuba) (Australia) | Antonio Daly; Bill Sidwell | 1; 6 | 1; 6 | 3; 6 |

=== Canada vs. Mexico ===
Canada
1
Mount Royal Tennis Club, Montreal, Canada
8–10 July 1948
Grass

Mexico
4

| | | | 1 | 2 | 3 | 4 | 5 |
|---|---|---|---|---|---|---|---|
| 1 | (Canada) (Mexico) | Henri Rochon; Francisco Guerrero Arcocha | 6; 2 | 7; 5 | 6; 4 |
| 2 | (Canada) (Mexico) | Brendan Macken; Armando Vega | 4; 6 | 1; 6 | 3; 6 |
| 3 | (Canada) (Mexico) | Brendan Macken / James Macken; Gustavo Palafox / Armando Vega | 2; 6 | 3; 6 | 4; 6 |
| 4 | (Canada) (Mexico) | Henri Rochon; Armando Vega | 2; 6 | 1; 6 | 3; 6 |
| 5 | (Canada) (Mexico) | Walter Stohlberg; Francisco Guerrero Arcocha | 10; 12 | 1; 6 | 2; 6 |

== Final ==
=== Mexico vs. Australia ===
Mexico
1
Centro Deportivo Chapultepec, Mexico City, Mexico
6–8 August 1948
Clay

Australia
4

| | | | 1 | 2 | 3 | 4 | 5 |
|---|---|---|---|---|---|---|---|
| 1 | (Mexico) (Australia) | Armando Vega; Bill Sidwell | 6; 2 | 6; 8 | 6; 3 | 4; 6 | 5; 7 |
| 2 | (Mexico) (Australia) | Gustavo Palafox; Adrian Quist | 4; 6 | 1; 6 | 4; 6 |
| 3 | (Mexico) (Australia) | Gustavo Palafox / Armando Vega; Geoff Brown / Colin Long | 0; 6 | 2; 6 | 2; 6 |
| 4 | (Mexico) (Australia) | Armando Vega; Adrian Quist | 9; 7 | 6; 4 | 6; 2 |
| 5 | (Mexico) (Australia) | Francisco Guerrero Arcocha; Bill Sidwell | 1; 6 | 4; 6 | 2; 6 |
