= 1938 International Lawn Tennis Challenge Europe Zone =

Tennis tournament results

Details
- Duration: 29 April 1938 – 31 July 1938
- Teams: 21
- Categories: 1938 Europe Zone; 1938 America Zone

Champion
- Winning nation: Germany; Qualified for: 1938 Inter-Zonal Final

The Europe Zone was one of the two regional zones of the 1938 International Lawn Tennis Challenge.

21 teams entered the Europe Zone, with the winner going on to compete in the Inter-Zonal Final against the winner of the America Zone. Germany defeated Yugoslavia in the final, and went on to face Australia in the Inter-Zonal Final.

== Draw ==
First Round; 29 April–10 May
Germany
bye
Norway
bye
Hungary
bye
New Zealand
bye
Monaco
bye
Netherlands	2
France	3
Poland	5
Denmark	0
Ireland	1
Italy	4
Great Britain	3
Romania	2
Yugoslavia	3
Czechoslovakia	2
bye
Sweden
bye
Switzerland
bye
India
bye
Austria
bye
Greece
bye
Belgium

Second Round; 5–23 May
Berlin, Germany (clay)
Germany	5
Norway	0
Hungary	w/o
New Zealand
Marseille, France (clay)
Monaco	0
France	5
Milan, Italy (clay)
Poland	2
Italy	3
Zagreb, Yugoslavia (clay)
Great Britain	0
Yugoslavia	5
Stockholm, Sweden (clay)
Sweden	4
Switzerland	1
India	w/o
Austria (Note: The tie between Austria and India was abandoned following the German annexation of Austria in March 1938.)
Athens, Greece
Greece	0
Belgium	5

Quarterfinals; 26–31 May
Budapest, Hungary
Germany	3
Hungary	1
Paris, France (clay)
France	4
Italy	1
Zagreb, Yugoslavia (clay)
Yugoslavia	3
Sweden	1
Brussels, Belgium
India	1
Belgium	3

Semifinals; 21–23 July
Berlin, Germany (clay)
Germany	3
France	2
Brussels, Belgium
Yugoslavia	5
Belgium	0

Final; 29–31 July
Berlin, Germany (clay)
Germany	3
Yugoslavia	2

== First round ==
=== Netherlands vs. France ===
Netherlands vs. France matches

Netherlands
2
Scheveningen, Netherlands
5–7 May 1938
Clay

France
3

			1	2	3	4	5
1	(Netherlands) (France)	Hans van Swol; Bernard Destremau	6; 3	6; 0	8; 6
2	(Netherlands) (France)	Tod Hughan; Yvon Petra	3; 6	2; 6	2; 6
3	(Netherlands) (France)	Tod Hughan / Hans van Swol; Henri Bolelli / Yvon Petra	6; 8	1; 6	6; 1	7; 5	6; 2
4	(Netherlands) (France)	Hans van Swol; Yvon Petra	0; 6	3; 6	2; 6
5	(Netherlands) (France)	Tod Hughan; Bernard Destremau	4; 6	2; 6	2; 6

=== Poland vs. Denmark ===
Poland
5
Kraków, Poland
5–7 May 1938

Denmark
0

			1	2	3	4	5
1	(Poland) (Denmark)	Józef Hebda; Helge Plougmann	6; 2	6; 2	6; 1
2	(Poland) (Denmark)	Ignacy Tłoczyński; Finn Bekkevold	6; 2	6; 3	6; 2
3	(Poland) (Denmark)	Józef Hebda / Ignacy Tłoczyński; Niels Korner / Einer Ulrich	6; 2	6; 3	6; 8	6; 3
4	(Poland) (Denmark)	Ignacy Tłoczyński; Helge Plougmann	6; 0	6; 2	6; 1
5	(Poland) (Denmark)	Józef Hebda; Finn Bekkevold	6; 4	7; 5	6; 1

=== Ireland vs. Italy ===
Ireland
1
Fitzwilliam Lawn Tennis Club, Dublin, Ireland
5–7 May 1938
Grass

Italy
4

			1	2	3	4	5
1	(Republic of Ireland) (Italy)	George Lyttleton-Rogers; Giorgio de Stefani	7; 5	2; 6	6; 3	6; 2
2	(Republic of Ireland) (Italy)	George McVeagh; Vanni Canepele	0; 6	2; 6	0; 6
3	(Republic of Ireland) (Italy)	George Lyttleton-Rogers / George McVeagh; Ferruccio Quintavalle / Valentino Taroni	3; 6	6; 4	1; 6	2; 6
4	(Republic of Ireland) (Italy)	Hector Ryan; Giorgio de Stefani	2; 6	2; 6	2; 6
5	(Republic of Ireland) (Italy)	George Lyttleton-Rogers; Vanni Canepele	7; 5	3; 6	6; 1	3; 6	1; 6

=== Great Britain vs. Romania ===
Great Britain
3
Royal Hall Grounds, Harrogate, England
7–10 May 1938
Clay

Romania
2

			1	2	3	4	5
1	(United Kingdom) (Romania)	Jimmy Jones; Cristea Caralulis	3; 6	6; 3	2; 6	6; 8
2	(United Kingdom) (Romania)	Ronald Shayes; Arnulf Schmidt	6; 3	6; 2	6; 2
3	(United Kingdom) (Romania)	Donald Butler / Frank Wilde; Cristea Caralulis / Arnulf Schmidt	8; 6	7; 5	6; 2
4	(United Kingdom) (Romania)	Jimmy Jones; Arnulf Schmidt	3; 6	1; 6	6; 0	6; 2	6; 8
5	(United Kingdom) (Romania)	Ronald Shayes; Cristea Caralulis	6; 3	6; 0	6; 3

=== Yugoslavia vs. Czechoslovakia ===
Yugoslavia
3
Zagreb, Yugoslavia
29 April–1 May 1938

Czechoslovakia
2

			1	2	3	4	5
1	(Kingdom of Yugoslavia) (Czechoslovakia)	Franjo Punčec; Ladislav Hecht	7; 5	6; 3	6; 3
2	(Kingdom of Yugoslavia) (Czechoslovakia)	Josip Palada; Roderich Menzel	2; 6	2; 6	1; 6
3	(Kingdom of Yugoslavia) (Czechoslovakia)	Dragutin Mitić / Franjo Punčec; František Cejnar / Roderich Menzel	9; 11	6; 3	7; 9	2; 6
4	(Kingdom of Yugoslavia) (Czechoslovakia)	Franjo Punčec; Roderich Menzel	3; 6	6; 1	6; 1	6; 2
5	(Kingdom of Yugoslavia) (Czechoslovakia)	Dragutin Mitić; František Cejnar	3; 6	7; 5	4; 6	6; 2	2; 1	retired

== Second round ==
=== Germany vs. Norway ===
Germany
5
Berlin, Germany
20–22 May 1938
Clay

Norway
0

			1	2	3	4	5
1	(Germany) (Norway)	Georg von Metaxa; Johan Haanes	2; 6	5; 7	6; 2	6; 3	7; 5
2	(Germany) (Norway)	Henner Henkel; Fritz Jenssen	6; 0	6; 0	6; 1
3	(Germany) (Norway)	Henner Henkel / Georg von Metaxa; Johan Haanes / Fritz Jenssen	6; 1	6; 2	6; 3
4	(Germany) (Norway)	Georg von Metaxa; Fritz Jenssen	6; 1	6; 0	6; 0
5	(Germany) (Norway)	Rolf Göpfert; Johan Haanes	6; 3	8; 6	6; 2

=== France vs. Monaco ===
France
5
Municipal Park Stadium, Marseille, France
21–23 May 1938
Clay

Monaco
0

			1	2	3	4	5
1	(France) (Monaco)	Bernard Destremau; Gaston Médécin	6; 3	6; 0	6; 1
2	(France) (Monaco)	Yvon Petra; Aleco Noghès	6; 1	6; 1	6; 0
3	(France) (Monaco)	Henri Bolelli / Pierre Pellizza; Vladimir Landau / Gaston Médécin	6; 2	6; 1	6; 3
4	(France) (Monaco)	Henri Bolelli; Aleco Noghès	6; 1	6; 1	6; 2
5	(France) (Monaco)	Pierre Pellizza; Gaston Médécin	6; 2	6; 1	3; 6	6; 4

=== Italy vs. Poland ===
Italy
3
Milan, Italy
19–21 May 1938
Clay

Poland
2

			1	2	3	4	5
1	(Italy) (Poland)	Vanni Canepele; Józef Hebda	6; 1	7; 9	6; 2	7; 9	6; 2
2	(Italy) (Poland)	Giorgio de Stefani; Ignacy Tłoczyński	8; 6	6; 4	2; 6	2; 6		retired
3	(Italy) (Poland)	Ferruccio Quintavalle / Valentino Taroni; Czesław Spychała / Ignacy Tłoczyński	11; 9	2; 6	6; 4	3; 6	7; 5
4	(Italy) (Poland)	Valentino Taroni; Józef Hebda	3; 6	6; 3	1; 6	4; 6
5	(Italy) (Poland)	Vanni Canepele; Ignacy Tłoczyński	6; 2	6; 1	2; 6	6; 2

=== Yugoslavia vs. Great Britain ===
Yugoslavia
5
Zagreb, Yugoslavia
20–22 May 1938
Clay

Great Britain
0

			1	2	3	4	5
1	(Kingdom of Yugoslavia) (United Kingdom)	Dragutin Mitić; Donald Butler	6; 3	6; 1	6; 4
2	(Kingdom of Yugoslavia) (United Kingdom)	Franjo Punčec; Ronald Shayes	6; 4	4; 6	6; 2	6; 4
3	(Kingdom of Yugoslavia) (United Kingdom)	Dragutin Mitić / Franjo Punčec; Donald Butler / Frank Wilde	7; 5	6; 3	3; 6	5; 7	6; 3
4	(Kingdom of Yugoslavia) (United Kingdom)	Dragutin Mitić; Ronald Shayes	6; 2	6; 3	11; 9
5	(Kingdom of Yugoslavia) (United Kingdom)	Franjo Punčec; Donald Butler	6; 3	6; 2	3; 6	6; 3

=== Sweden vs. Switzerland ===
Sweden
4
Tennisstadion, Stockholm, Sweden
20–22 May 1938
Clay

Switzerland
1

			1	2	3	4	5
1	(Sweden) (Switzerland)	Kalle Schröder; Hector Fisher	8; 6	6; 2	6; 0
2	(Sweden) (Switzerland)	Nils Rohlsson; Boris Maneff	1; 6	4; 6	6; 2	1; 6
3	(Sweden) (Switzerland)	Nils Rohlsson / Kalle Schröder; Hector Fisher / Boris Maneff	6; 2	5; 7	6; 4	7; 5
4	(Sweden) (Switzerland)	Kalle Schröder; Boris Maneff	3; 6	1; 6	6; 2	6; 4	6; 2
5	(Sweden) (Switzerland)	Nils Rohlsson; Hector Fisher	3; 6	4; 6	6; 4	6; 3	6; 1

=== Greece vs. Belgium ===
Greece
0
Athens, Greece
5–7 May 1938

Belgium
5

			1	2	3	4	5
1	(Greece) (Belgium)	Lazaros Stalios; André Lacroix	1; 6	2; 6	1; 6
2	(Greece) (Belgium)	Georgios Nikolaides; Charles Naeyaert	1; 6	4; 6	7; 9
3	(Greece) (Belgium)	Georgios Nikolaides / Lazaros Stalios; Léopold de Borman / André Lacroix	2; 6	1; 6	1; 6
4	(Greece) (Belgium)	Lazaros Stalios; Charles Naeyaert	4; 6	3; 6	2; 6
5	(Greece) (Belgium)	Georgios Nikolaides; Pierre Geelhand de Merxem	4; 6	3; 6	3; 6

== Quarterfinals ==
=== Hungary vs. Germany ===
Hungary
1
Budapest, Hungary
26–28 May 1938

Germany
3

			1	2	3	4	5
1	(Hungary) (Germany)	György Dallos; Henner Henkel	4; 6	9; 11	0; 6
2	(Hungary) (Germany)	Emil Gábori; Georg von Metaxa	7; 5	6; 4	4; 6	2; 6	7; 5
3	(Hungary) (Germany)	József Asbóth / György Dallos; Henner Henkel / Georg von Metaxa	7; 5	1; 6	6; 8	3; 6
4	(Hungary) (Germany)	György Dallos; Georg von Metaxa	2; 6	6; 3	3; 6	2; 6
5	(Hungary) (Germany)	Emil Gábori; Henner Henkel	1; 6					not completed

=== France vs. Italy ===
France
4
Stade Roland Garros, Paris, France
27–29 May 1938
Clay

Italy
1

			1	2	3	4	5
1	(France) (Italy)	Yvon Petra; Valentino Taroni	6; 0	6; 2	6; 3
2	(France) (Italy)	Bernard Destremau; Vanni Canepele	3; 6	6; 0	6; 2	7; 5
3	(France) (Italy)	Henri Bolelli / Pierre Pellizza; Ferruccio Quintavalle / Valentino Taroni	9; 7	6; 3	6; 4
4	(France) (Italy)	Bernard Destremau; Valentino Taroni	6; 8	7; 5	4; 6	2; 6
5	(France) (Italy)	Pierre Pellizza; Renato Bossi	4; 6	6; 4	5; 7	6; 3	7; 5

=== Yugoslavia vs. Sweden ===
Yugoslavia
3
Zagreb, Yugoslavia
29–31 May 1938
Clay

Sweden
1

			1	2	3	4	5
1	(Kingdom of Yugoslavia) (Sweden)	Josip Palada; Kalle Schröder	5; 7	6; 1	2; 6	8; 6	3; 6
2	(Kingdom of Yugoslavia) (Sweden)	Franjo Punčec; Nils Rohlsson	6; 2	6; 3	6; 2
3	(Kingdom of Yugoslavia) (Sweden)	Franjo Kukuljević / Franjo Punčec; Nils Rohlsson / Kalle Schröder	6; 3	9; 7	6; 3
4	(Kingdom of Yugoslavia) (Sweden)	Josip Palada; Nils Rohlsson	7; 5	7; 5	6; 1
5	(Kingdom of Yugoslavia) (Sweden)	Franjo Punčec; Kalle Schröder						not played

=== Belgium vs. India ===
Belgium
3
Brussels, Belgium
26–28 May 1938

India
1

			1	2	3	4	5
1	(Belgium) (India)	Charles Naeyaert; Ghaus Mohammad Khan	7; 5	6; 2	3; 6	1; 6	7; 9
2	(Belgium) (India)	André Lacroix; Subba Sawhney	6; 4	6; 3	4; 6	6; 3
3	(Belgium) (India)	Léopold de Borman / André Lacroix; Ghaus Mohammad Khan / Subba Sawhney	4; 6	3; 6	6; 3	7; 5	6; 4
4	(Belgium) (India)	André Lacroix; Ghaus Mohammad Khan	7; 5	0; 6	2; 6	7; 5	6; 3
5	(Belgium) (India)	Pierre Geelhand de Merxem; Subba Sawhney						not played

== Semifinals ==
=== Germany vs. France ===
Germany
3
Rot-Weiss Tennis Club, Berlin, Germany
21–23 July 1938
Clay

France
2

			1	2	3	4	5
1	(Germany) (France)	Henner Henkel; Yvon Petra	4; 6	6; 1	11; 9	6; 2
2	(Germany) (France)	Georg von Metaxa; Bernard Destremau	6; 4	7; 5	5; 7	5; 7	6; 3
3	(Germany) (France)	Henner Henkel / Georg von Metaxa; Jean Lesueur / Yvon Petra	4; 6	6; 4	2; 6	10; 8	6; 4
4	(Germany) (France)	Georg von Metaxa; Yvon Petra	7; 9	6; 8	4; 6
5	(Germany) (France)	Hans Redl; Bernard Destremau	8; 6	4; 6	4; 6	2; 6

=== Belgium vs. Yugoslavia ===
Belgium
0
Brussels, Belgium
21–23 July 1938

Yugoslavia
5

			1	2	3	4	5
1	(Belgium) (Kingdom of Yugoslavia)	Jacques Van den Eynde; Franjo Punčec	6; 2	0; 6	1; 6	2; 6
2	(Belgium) (Kingdom of Yugoslavia)	André Lacroix; Josip Palada	4; 6	1; 6	2; 6
3	(Belgium) (Kingdom of Yugoslavia)	Léopold de Borman / Pierre Geelhand de Merxem; Franjo Kukuljević / Dragutin Mitić	3; 6	3; 6	6; 3	8; 10
4	(Belgium) (Kingdom of Yugoslavia)	André Lacroix; Franjo Punčec	4; 6	1; 6	2; 6
5	(Belgium) (Kingdom of Yugoslavia)	Jacques Van den Eynde; Josip Palada	3; 6	3; 6	1; 6

== Final ==
=== Germany vs. Yugoslavia ===
Germany
3
Rot-Weiss Tennis Club, Berlin, Germany
29–31 July 1938
Clay

Yugoslavia
2

			1	2	3	4	5
1	(Germany) (Kingdom of Yugoslavia)	Henner Henkel; Franjo Punčec	1; 6	5; 7	3; 6
2	(Germany) (Kingdom of Yugoslavia)	Georg von Metaxa; Josip Palada	1; 6	6; 4	6; 1	3; 6	12; 10
3	(Germany) (Kingdom of Yugoslavia)	Henner Henkel / Georg von Metaxa; Franjo Kukuljević / Franjo Punčec	1; 6	7; 9	7; 5	6; 4	6; 4
4	(Germany) (Kingdom of Yugoslavia)	Henner Henkel; Josip Palada	6; 3	7; 5	6; 1
5	(Germany) (Kingdom of Yugoslavia)	Hans Redl; Franjo Kukuljević	4; 6	3; 6	2; 6
