= Canadian Covered Court Championships =

Defunct tennis tournament
- Tour: ILTF World Circuit
- Founded: 1920
- Abolished: 1936
- Location: Montreal, Quebec, Canada
- Venue: Montreal Indoor Tennis Club
- Surface: Wood / indoor

The Canadian Covered Court Championships was an indoor wood court tennis tournament first held in October 1920, at the Montreal Indoor Tennis Club, Montreal, Canada. The initial edition of the tournament – and all subsequent editions held before World War Two – featured only two events: men’s singles and men’s doubles. The event ran annually until 1936.

== History ==
This tournament from 1920 to 1925 was mainly attended by Canadian players. The event was not staged in 1926.

In 1927 it was revived and from this season started to feature American players. In 1935 tournament was won by Bob Murray. The event ended the following year in 1936. A new indoor successor tournament would not be reestablished until 1973 with the Canadian Indoor Tennis Championships.

== Records ==
Singles

- Most titles: (Canada) Willard Crocker & (United States) George Lott (4).
- Most finals: (Canada) Willard Crocker (6)
- Most consecutive titles: (Canada) Willard Crocker & (United States) George Lott (2) twice
- Most consecutive finals: (Canada) Willard Crocker (3)
