= 1938 International Lawn Tennis Challenge =

1938 edition of the International Lawn Tennis Challenge

Details
- Duration: 29 April – 5 September 1938
- Edition: 33rd
- Teams: 24

Champion
- Winning nation: United States

The 1938 International Lawn Tennis Challenge was the 33rd edition of what is now known as the Davis Cup. 21 teams entered the Europe Zone, while 4 entered the Americas Zone.

Australia defeated Japan in the Americas Zone final, while in the Europe Zone final Germany defeated Yugoslavia. Australia defeated Germany in the Inter-Zonal play-off, but were defeated in the Challenge Round by defending champions the United States. The final was played at the Germantown Cricket Club in Philadelphia, Pennsylvania, United States on 3–5 September.

== America Zone ==
=== Draw ===
Semifinals; 28–31 July
Kansas City, MO, United States (clay)
Australia	5
Mexico	0
Montreal, Canada (grass)
Canada	0
Japan	5

Final; 12–14 August
Montreal, Canada (grass)
Australia	3
Japan	1

=== Final ===
Australia vs. Japan

Australia
3
Mount Royal Tennis Club, Montreal, Canada
12–14 August 1938
Grass

Japan
1

			1	2	3	4	5
1	(Australia) (Japan)	John Bromwich; Jiro Yamagishi	0; 6	6; 3	5; 7	4; 6
2	(Australia) (Japan)	Adrian Quist; Fumiteru Nakano	6; 3	4; 6	9; 7	6; 1
3	(Australia) (Japan)	John Bromwich / Adrian Quist; Fumiteru Nakano / Jiro Yamagishi	6; 2	6; 4	6; 3
4	(Australia) (Japan)	Adrian Quist; Jiro Yamagishi	6; 4	6; 4	2; 6	9; 7
5	(Australia) (Japan)	John Bromwich; Fumiteru Nakano	1; 6	6; 1	4; 6	12; 12		not completed

== Europe Zone ==
=== Draw ===
First Round; 29 April–10 May
Germany
bye
Norway
bye
Hungary
bye
New Zealand
bye
Monaco
bye
Netherlands	2
France	3
Poland	5
Denmark	0
Ireland	1
Italy	4
Great Britain	3
Romania	2
Yugoslavia	3
Czechoslovakia	2
bye
Sweden
bye
Switzerland
bye
India
bye
Austria
bye
Greece
bye
Belgium

Second Round; 5–23 May
Berlin, Germany (clay)
Germany	5
Norway	0
Hungary	w/o
New Zealand
Marseille, France (clay)
Monaco	0
France	5
Milan, Italy (clay)
Poland	2
Italy	3
Zagreb, Yugoslavia (clay)
Great Britain	0
Yugoslavia	5
Stockholm, Sweden (clay)
Sweden	4
Switzerland	1
India	w/o
Austria (Note: The tie between Austria and India was abandoned following the German annexation of Austria in March 1938.)
Athens, Greece
Greece	0
Belgium	5

Quarterfinals; 26–31 May
Budapest, Hungary
Germany	3
Hungary	1
Paris, France (clay)
France	4
Italy	1
Zagreb, Yugoslavia (clay)
Yugoslavia	3
Sweden	1
Brussels, Belgium
India	1
Belgium	3

Semifinals; 21–23 July
Berlin, Germany (clay)
Germany	3
France	2
Brussels, Belgium
Yugoslavia	5
Belgium	0

Final; 29–31 July
Berlin, Germany (clay)
Germany	3
Yugoslavia	2

=== Final ===
Germany vs. Yugoslavia

Germany
3
Rot-Weiss Tennis Club, Berlin, Germany
29–31 July 1938
Clay

Yugoslavia
2

			1	2	3	4	5
1	(Germany) (Kingdom of Yugoslavia)	Henner Henkel; Franjo Punčec	1; 6	5; 7	3; 6
2	(Germany) (Kingdom of Yugoslavia)	Georg von Metaxa; Josip Palada	1; 6	6; 4	6; 1	3; 6	12; 10
3	(Germany) (Kingdom of Yugoslavia)	Henner Henkel / Georg von Metaxa; Franjo Kukuljević / Franjo Punčec	1; 6	7; 9	7; 5	6; 4	6; 4
4	(Germany) (Kingdom of Yugoslavia)	Henner Henkel; Josip Palada	6; 3	7; 5	6; 1
5	(Germany) (Kingdom of Yugoslavia)	Hans Redl; Franjo Kukuljević	4; 6	3; 6	2; 6

== Inter-Zonal Final ==
Australia vs. Germany

Australia
5
Longwood Cricket Club, Boston, MA, United States
18–20 August 1938
Grass

Germany
0

			1	2	3	4	5
1	(Australia) (Germany)	John Bromwich; Henner Henkel	6; 2	6; 3	6; 3
2	(Australia) (Germany)	Adrian Quist; Georg von Metaxa	6; 3	6; 2	6; 1
3	(Australia) (Germany)	John Bromwich / Adrian Quist; Henner Henkel / Georg von Metaxa	6; 2	6; 1	6; 4
4	(Australia) (Germany)	Adrian Quist; Henner Henkel	6; 1	6; 0	8; 6
5	(Australia) (Germany)	John Bromwich; Georg von Metaxa	6; 3	6; 2	6; 1

== Challenge Round ==
United States vs. Australia

United States
3
Germantown Cricket Club, Philadelphia, PA, United States
3–5 September 1938
Grass

Australia
2

			1	2	3	4	5
1	(United States) (Australia)	Bobby Riggs; Adrian Quist	4; 6	6; 0	8; 6	6; 1
2	(United States) (Australia)	Don Budge; John Bromwich	6; 2	6; 3	4; 6	7; 5
3	(United States) (Australia)	Don Budge / Gene Mako; John Bromwich / Adrian Quist	6; 0	3; 6	4; 6	2; 6
4	(United States) (Australia)	Don Budge; Adrian Quist	8; 6	6; 1	6; 2
5	(United States) (Australia)	Bobby Riggs; John Bromwich	4; 6	6; 4	0; 6	2; 6

== See also ==
- 1938 Wightman Cup
