= José Agüero (Cuban tennis player) =

Cuban tennis player

- Country (sports): Cuba
Medal record
Central American and Caribbean Games
Gold medal – first place	1946 Barranquilla	Men's doubles
Silver medal – second place	1938 Panama City	Men's doubles
Silver medal – second place	1946 Barranquilla	Men's singles

José Agüero is a Cuban former tennis player.

Agüero had an intermittent Davis Cup career, featuring in a total of eight ties between 1935 and 1952. In 1946 he was runner-up to Mexico's Anselmo Puente in the singles event at the Central American and Caribbean Games in Barranquilla, but won a gold medal in the doubles, partnering Ricardo Morales.

== See also ==
- List of Cuba Davis Cup team representatives
