= Jack Wright (tennis) =

Canadian tennis player

- Country (sports): Canada
- Born: November 11, 1901 Nelson, British Columbia, Canada
- Died: September 21, 1949 (aged 47) Vancouver, British Columbia, Canada

Singles
- Career record: 53-23
- Career titles: 6
- Highest ranking: No. 3 (1927)

Doubles
- Career titles: 4

John Andrew Wright M.D., C.M. (November 11, 1901 – September 21, 1949) was a Canadian tennis player and physician and surgeon. He won the singles title at the Canadian Open in 1927, 1929 and 1931.

His tennis game was characterized by a powerful service and groundstrokes.

== Tennis career ==
=== Tournament play ===
Wright captured the Canadian Open tennis tournament singles title three times, in 1927, 1929, and 1931. He won the doubles title four times with his Davis Cup teammate Willard Crocker in 1923, 1925, and 1929, and once with Marcel Rainville, in 1931.

At one point in 1927 he was ranked third in the world, the highest ranking achieved by a Canadian singles player until Milos Raonic in 2016. Wright was also Canada's top ranked tennis player for five years (1926 to 1929 and 1931).

In the 1929 Canadian Open Championships, he defeated two prominent American players in the semifinal and final in four-set matches, John Doeg and Frank Shields. These two players would contest the final of the U.S. Open Tennis Championships the following season, Doeg defeating Shields, and were ranked as the US No. 1 and No. 2 players for 1930 by the USLTA.

Wright competed in the U.S. National Championship for singles tennis five times and reached the round of 16 twice, in 1924 and 1927, losing to Bill Tilden and Bill Johnston respectively. He lost in the first round of Wimbledon in 1929, to Wilbur Coen in four sets, in his only appearance there.

Wright once had a win over Bill Tilden in two very long straight sets.

=== Davis Cup ===
Wright played 14 Davis Cup ties for Canada, over 11 years. He had 6 wins against 20 losses in singles and went 3 and 11 in doubles.

Wright's most famous Davis Cup singles win occurred in 1927, when he defeated Japan's Takeichi Harada, then ranked No. 3 in the world, in three straight sets.

In 1932, he lost a close five-set Davis Cup match to Ellsworth Vines, who won at both Wimbledon and the U.S. Championships that year.

== Medical career ==
Jack Wright served in WWII as a captain in the Royal Canadian Medical Corps and the Canadian Scottish Regiment in Normandy and France. He died in Vancouver, British Columbia in 1949.

== Honours ==
Wright was inducted into the Canada's Sports Hall of Fame in 1955 and the Canadian Olympic Hall of Fame in 1972. He was inducted into the McGill Redmen Hall of Fame in 2000.

In a Canadian newspaper poll in 1950, he was ranked Canada's top tennis player of the first half of the 20th century.
