= Willard Crocker =

Canadian tennis player

- Full name: Willard Frederick Crocker
- Country (sports): Canada
- Born: 21 July, 1900 Newton, Massachusetts, United States
- Died: 7 February, 1964 Montreal, Quebec, Canada
- Turned pro: 1921 (amateur tour)
- Retired: 1931

Singles
- Career record: 60-18
- Career titles: 15

Grand Slam singles results
- Wimbledon: 2R (1929)
- US Open: 3R (1924)

Willard Frederick Crocker (21 July 1898 – 7 February 1964) was a Canadian National singles and doubles tennis champion and Canadian Davis Cup player. He was active from 1921 to 1931 and won 15 singles titles.

== Career ==
Born in Newton, Massachusetts, Crocker studied at Tufts University and then moved to Montreal to attend McGill University medical school in 1920. He remained a Montreal resident thereafter. He became a Canadian citizen and represented Canada in Davis Cup play from 1923.

Crocker won the 1925 Canadian Championships defeating American Wallace Scott in a long four sets final. He captured three doubles crowns as well, in 1923, 1925, and 1929, all partnering his Davis Cup and McGill Redmen teammate Jack Wright.

Crocker competed in the United States National Championship twice, in 1923 and 1924, reaching the Round of 16 in his second appearance. He reached the second round in his only appearance at the Wimbledon Championships, defeating Briton Jack Harrison in straight sets before falling to another British player, John Olliff.

He captured the Canadian Covered Court Championships for singles in 1922, 1923, 1925 ( defeating Jack Wright in a five set final). In the 1929 tournament, he defeated prominent U.S. player Fritz Mercur in the semifinal before losing the final to J. Gilbert Hall in four sets in the final. He was doubles champion in the event three times, partnering Wright, in 1922, 1925, and 1926. He was also Ontario and Quebec provincial champion, in both singles and doubles, in both 1923 and 1925.

Crocker was ranked No. 2 singles player in Canada from 1926 to 1929.

In Davis Cup, Crocker won 5 of 16 matches he played in singles and 3 of 8 in doubles, in ties played from 1923 to 1930. Canada's best result during Crocker's time with the team was defeating Cuba to reach the America Zone final, in 1927, where they lost to Japan 2–3.

Crocker attended McGill University, studying medicine and later English, and captained the tennis team in 1920 when he captured both the singles and doubles Canadian intercollegiate championships. He was team president when again won the singles crown in 1923.

Crocker was inducted posthumously into the Canadian Amateur Sports Hall of Fame in addition to the Canadian Tennis Hall of Fame in 1991. He was inducted into the McGill Redmen Hall of Fame in 1999. He died in Montreal on 7 February 1964.

== Sources ==
- ITF Men's Circuit profile page
- Davis Cup player profile page
- McGill Redmen Hall of Fame inductee page
