= Ricardo Tapia =

Mexican tennis player (1909–1996)

- Full name: Ricardo Tapia Acuña
- Country (sports): Mexico
- Born: 27 September 1909; Mexico City, Mexico
- Died: 2 April 1996 (aged 86)

Singles

Grand Slam singles results
- US Open: 1R (1928)
Medal record
Central American and Caribbean Games
Gold medal – first place	1935 San Salvador	Men's doubles
Silver medal – second place	1930 Havana	Men's singles
Bronze medal – third place	1930 Havana	Men's doubles

Ricardo Tapia Acuña (27 September 1909 – 2 April 1996) was a Mexican tennis player.

The son of a doctor, Tapia was born in Mexico City and competed on the international tour in the 1920s and 1930s. After his tennis career he followed his father into medicine and was a noted otolaryngologist.

Tapia represented Mexico in the Davis Cup between 1928 and 1937, appearing in a total of eight ties. Often coming up against a strong United States team, he has the unenviable record of not registering a win from either his 15 singles rubbers or three doubles rubbers.

His sister María was Mexico's top women's player of her era.

== See also ==
- List of Mexico Davis Cup team representatives
