= Zenzo Shimizu =

Japanese tennis player (1891–1977)

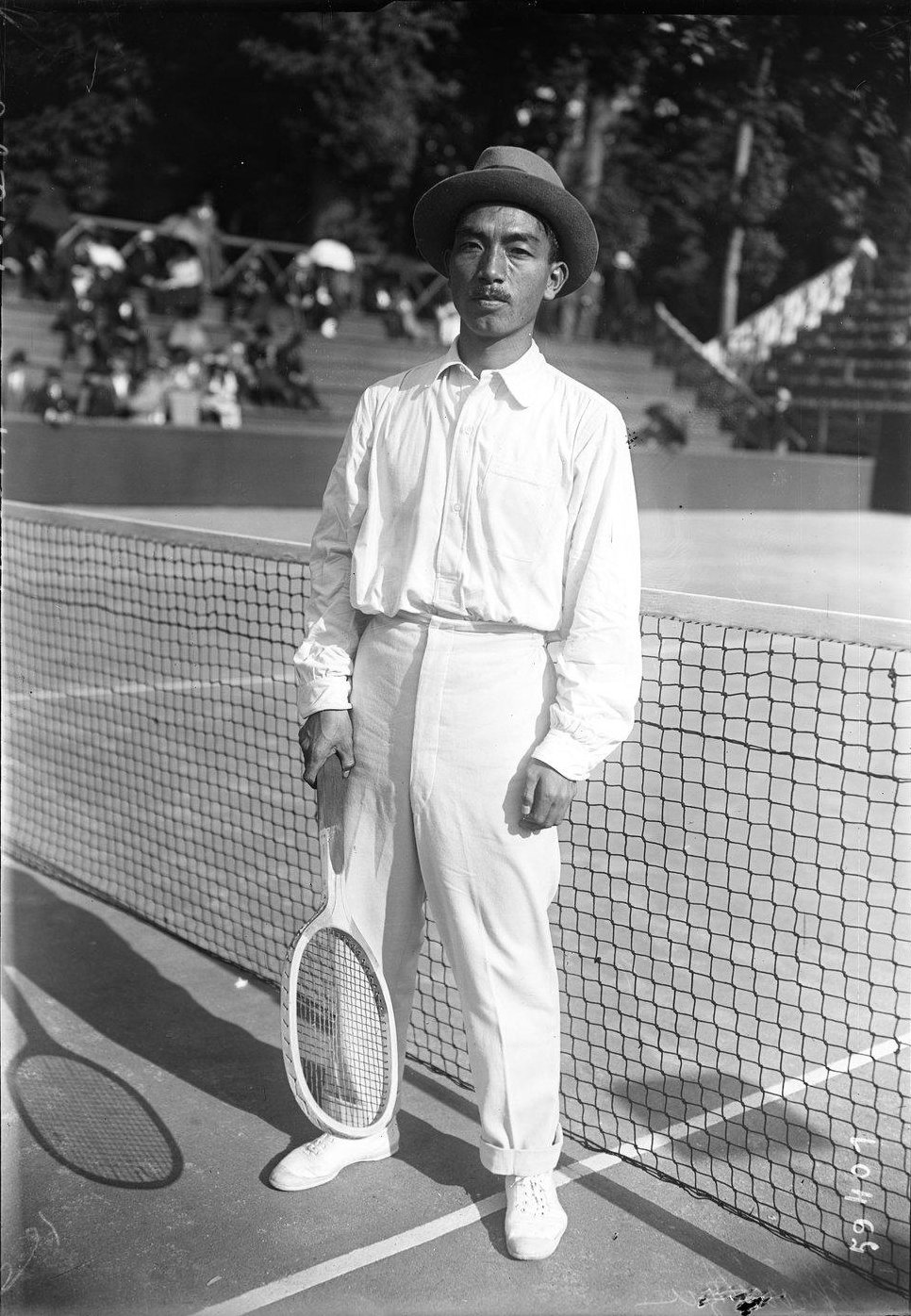
- Country (sports): Japan
- Born: 25 March 1891 Misato, Gunma, Japan
- Died: 12 April 1977 (aged 86) Osaka, Japan
- Turned pro: 1920 (amateur tour)
- Retired: 1924
- Plays: Right-handed (one-handed backhand)
- College: Tokyo Higher Commerce School

Singles
- Career record: 109–34 (76.2%)
- Career titles: 10
- Highest ranking: No. 4 (1921, A. Wallis Myers)

Grand Slam singles results
- Wimbledon: F (1920^{(AC)})
- US Open: QF (1922)

Other tournaments
- WHCC: QF (1920)

Team competitions
- Davis Cup: F (1921^{Ch})

Zenzo Shimizu (清水 善造, Shimizu Zenzō; 25 March 1891 – 12 April 1977), also spelt Zenzo Shimidzu, was a Japanese tennis player.

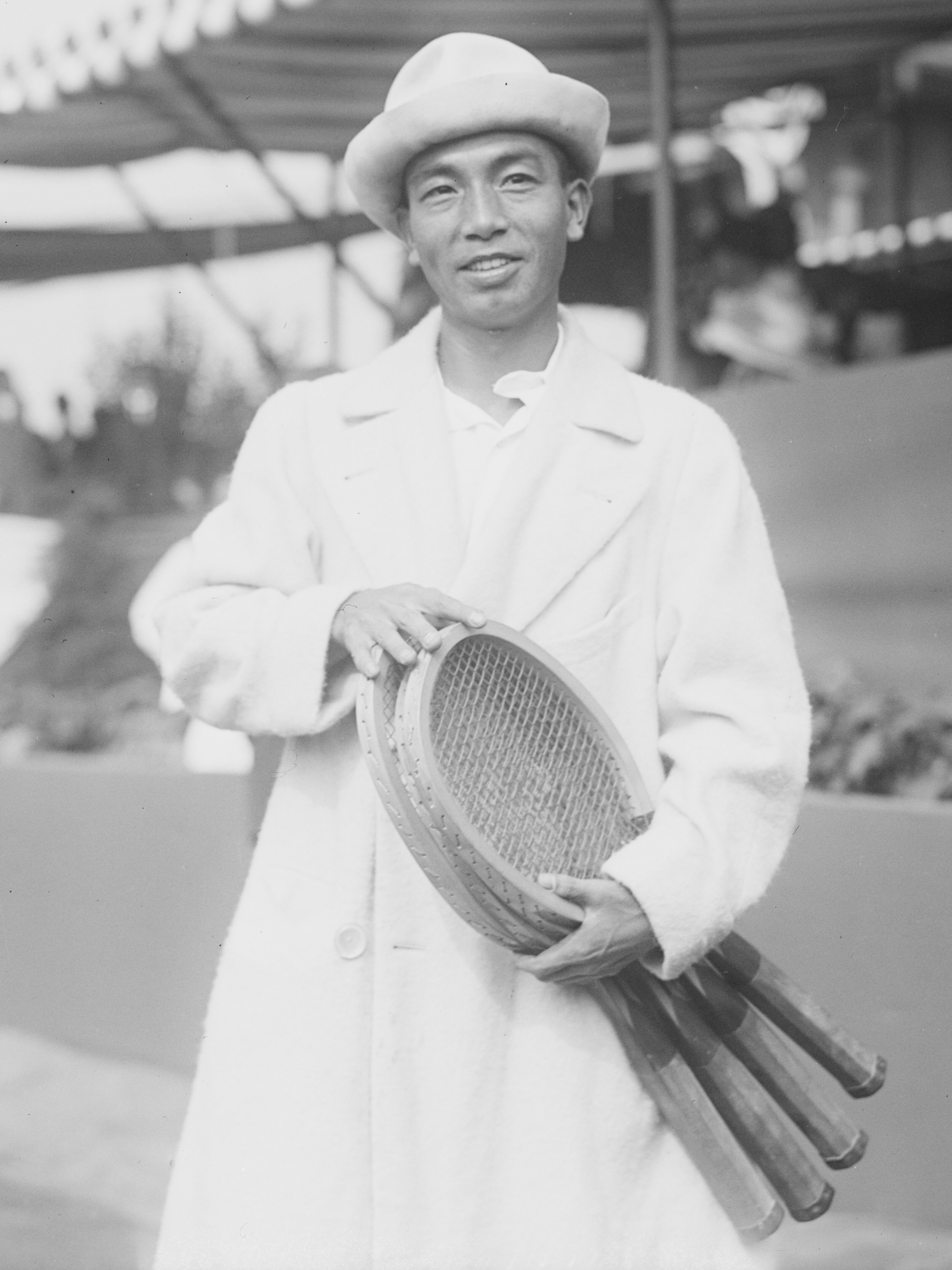
Zenzo Shimizu in the 1920s

Shimizu graduated from the Tokyo Higher Commerce School (now Hitotsubashi University). In 1912, he started to work for Mitsui & Co. He married the daughter of Sohōka. He resided in Calcutta and New York. In 1929 he was transferred to Mitsui Life Insurance Co., became the manager of Kobe Branch, in 1945 the director thereof and thereafter was expelled from his official position after World War II. He was running a trading company in Kobe thereafter. In 1965 he collapsed from a stroke. In 1977 he died in Osaka at the age of 86.

While having this educational background and career he reached the All-Comers final of the Wimbledon Championships in 1920, where he lost to Bill Tilden 4–6, 4–6, 11–13. At the 1921 Wimbledon Championships he reached the semifinal which he lost to Manuel Alonso in five sets. He also was a member of Japan's Davis Cup team that finished second to United States in 1921. In 1921 he won the singles title at the London Championships by defeating Mohammed Sleem in the final in straight sets. He established the earliest period of Japanese tennis together with Ichiya Kumagae (accurately speaking, Kumagai).

Shimizu was ranked World No. 4 by A. Wallis Myers of The Daily Telegraph in 1921.

Zenzo Shimizu (清水善三) (the same pronunciation but different Kanji comparing with Zenzo of this article, 善造) who is an ex-actor is his grandson.

== Playing style ==
Shimizu was mainly a baseline player. His forehand grip was described as 'faulty' but nevertheless his passing shots, which he hit low and with topspin, were judged as excellent. Shimizu's backhand was orthodox and played with force from the baseline. His service was hit at shoulder height with precision and reverse twist but without great speed. His forehand volleys were comparatively weak but his backhand volleys and his smash were first-class. In his book The Art of Lawn Tennis Bill Tilden describes Shimuzu as a baseline player and marvelous court coverer with an uncanny accuracy in his shots. In comparing Shimuzu to his countryman Kumagae he states that Shimizu had a superior backhand and low volleying skills but lacked Kumagae's forehand drive and had a weaker service. Their high volleying skills and overheads were judged equal.

== Career finals (15) ==
=== Titles (10) ===
- 1913: Bengal Championships
- 1916: Bengal Championships (2)
- 1918: Bengal Championships (3)
- 1918: Western India Championships
- 1919: Bengal Championships (4)
- 1920: Bengal Championships (5)
- 1920: North London Championships
- 1920: Sheffield and Hallamshire Championships
- 1921: London Championships
- 1922: Greenwich Tennis Club Invitation

=== Runners-Up (5) ===
- 1914: Bengal Championships
- 1916: Western India Championships
- 1919: Western India Championships
- 1920: Kent Championships
- 1922: U.S. Clay Court Championships
