= Takeichi Harada =

Japanese tennis player (1899–1978)

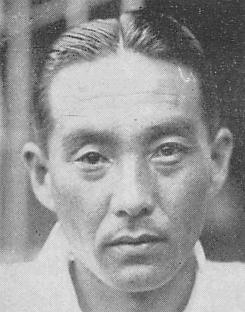
- Takeichi Harada c. 1934
- Country (sports): Japan
- Born: 16 May 1899 Osaka, Japan
- Died: 12 June 1978 (aged 79) Kurashiki, Japan
- Turned pro: 1924 (amateur tour)

Singles
- Career titles: 5
- Highest ranking: No. 7 (1926, A. Wallis Myers)

Grand Slam singles results
- Australian Open: 1R (1932)
- French Open: 3R (1930)
- Wimbledon: 3R (1924, 1930)
- US Open: 3R (1925, 1927)

Other tournaments
- Olympic Games: QF (1924)

Doubles
- Olympic Games: 2R (1924)

Team competitions
- Davis Cup: F (1926, 1927)

Takeichi Harada (原田 武一, Harada Takeichi; 16 May 1899 – 12 June 1978) was an amateur tennis player from Japan who competed in the 1920s and 1930s, including the 1924 Summer Olympics.

Harada was also ranked World No. 10 by Myers and the U.S. No. 3 in 1925. He was ranked World No. 7 in 1926 by A. Wallis Myers of The Daily Telegraph.

In 1923 he won the All-Japan Championships singles title. Harada moved to the United States to continue his studies at the Harvard University. In 1926 he won the Jamaican International Championships. In 1929 he won the All-Japan Championships singles and doubles.

He was coached by Harry Cowles.

== Personal life ==
Takeichi Harada was married and his first child was born in 1929. He was the head manager of a mall in Tokyo. In 1925 he was awarded the AAF World Trophy by the Amateur Athletic Foundation for his merits in tennis.
