= Daniel Hernández (tennis) =

Mexican tennis player

- Country (sports): Mexico
- Height: 1.7 m (5 ft 7 in)
Medal record
Central American and Caribbean Games
Gold medal – first place	1938 Panama City	Men's doubles
Bronze medal – third place	1938 Panama City	Mixed doubles

Daniel Hernández was a Mexican tennis player active in the 1930s.

Between 1935 and 1939, Hernández appeared in six Davis Cup ties for Mexico. He competed twice against top American player Don Budge and won his only two singles rubbers in his debut tie against Cuba.

Hernández was a men's doubles gold medalist at the 1938 Central American and Caribbean Games in Panama City, partnering Esteban Reyes. He also won a bronze medal for Mexico in the mixed doubles.

== See also ==
- List of Mexico Davis Cup team representatives
