= Fumiteru Nakano =

Japanese tennis player (1915–1989)

- Country (sports): Japan
- Born: 13 January 1915 Mizunami, Gifu, Japan
- Died: 30 December 1989 (aged 74) (Note: Death date is according to Japanese Tennis Association. According to the Davis Cup website the death date is 20 January 1990.)

Singles

Grand Slam singles results
- French Open: 4R (1938)
- Wimbledon: 3R (1937, 1938)
- US Open: 4R (1937)

Doubles

Grand Slam doubles results
- Wimbledon: QF (1937)

Fumiteru Nakano (中野文照, Nakanō Fumiteru; Japanese pronunciation: [nakano ɸɯmiteɾɯ]; 13 January 1915 – 30 December 1989) was a male tennis player from Japan who was active from the 1930s until the 1950s.

== Career ==
Nakano reached the fourth round of the men's singles at the 1938 French Championships, a feat that would not be achieved again by a Japanese man until 2013. (Note: In 2013 Kei Nishikori equalled Nakano's achievement of a Japanese male player reaching the fourth round in the singles at Roland Garros.) In July he was eliminated in the semifinals of the Queen's Club Championships by eventual winner Don Budge. In the fourth round he lost in three straight sets to Frantisek Cejnar from Czechoslovakia. In September of the same year he also reached the fourth round of the U.S National Championships in which he was defeated in four sets by Bobby Riggs. Together with his countryman Jiro Yamagishi he reached the quarterfinal of the men's doubles at the 1937 Wimbledon Championships. The two won the Maidstone Club's invitational tournament later the same month. They also clinched the doubles title of the Pacific Coast Men's Doubles Championship at the La Jolla Beach and Tennis Club. In August he reached the quarterfinal of the Newport Casino Invitational falling to Frank Parker. As a result, he became the third ranked player of Japan that year.

In 1947 and 1948 he won the singles title at the All Japan Championships and he was ranked the No.1 player in Japan in 1939, 1947 and 1948. In 1951 he was still active and reached the semifinals of the Calcutta international tournament and the quarterfinal of the U.S. Men's Clay Court Championships.

Between 1937 and 1952 he played in five ties for the Japanese Davis Cup team. The best team result during that period was reaching the final of the Americas Zone in 1938 against Australia. Nakano had a Davis Cup match record of three wins, 10 losses and one unfinished match against John Bromwich. He also represented Japan in the 1940 International Athletic Meet in Tokyo, which was a substitute for the 1940 Summer Olympics originally scheduled to take place in Japan.

== Personal life ==
Fumiteru Nakano studied at the Hosei University of Tokyo.

== See also ==
- List of Japan Davis Cup team representatives
