= Jiro Yamagishi =

Japanese tennis player (1912–1977)

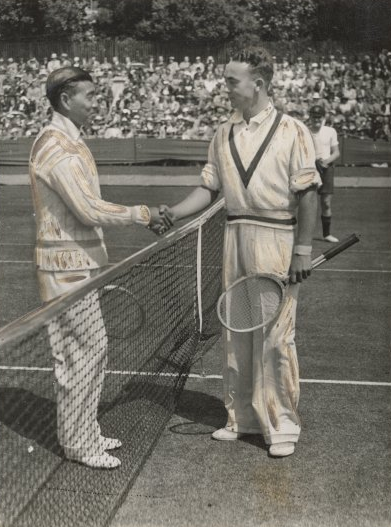
- Yamagishi and Vivian McGrath at the 1934 Davis Cup.
- Country (sports): Japan
- Born: 23 May 1912 Moji, Japan
- Died: 30 January 1997 (aged 84)
- Turned pro: 1932 (amateur tour)
- Retired: 1953

Singles
- Career record: 102-34 (75%)
- Career titles: 11
- Highest ranking: No. 8 (1938, A. Wallis Myers)

Grand Slam singles results
- French Open: 2R (1935)
- Wimbledon: 4R (1934)
- US Open: 4R (1937)

Grand Slam doubles results
- Wimbledon: QF (1937)

Grand Slam mixed doubles results
- Wimbledon: QF (1937)

Jiro Yamagishi (山岸二郎, Yamagishi Jirō; 23 May 1912 – 30 January 1997) was an amateur tennis player from Japan who competed primarily in the 1930s. He was ranked World No 8 in 1938.

== Career ==
He played his first tournament at the U.S. Clay Court Championships in June 1932. He competed in the Wimbledon Championships in 1934, 1935 and 1937. In the singles event his best result was reaching the fourth round in 1934, losing to eventual finalist Jack Crawford. In 1937 he made it to the quarterfinal of the doubles competition, partnering Fumiteru Nakano, and the mixed doubles event, with Betty Nuthall.

Yamagishi won his first singles title at the Surrey Championships in 1934 in all Japanese final against Hideo Nishimura he was a finalist at the Kent Championships the same year but then went on to win the title twice in 1935 and 1937.

Between 1934 and 1938 he was a part of the Japanese Davis Cup team and played in six ties, compiling a record of eight wins and ten losses. In 1934 he was the roommate of Jiro Sato on board the ship sailing to Europe for the Davis Cup match against Australia in the second round of the 1934 Davis Cup. On 5 April 1934 at 11:30 p.m. he discovered that Sato was missing and had committed suicide by jumping overboard. In 1935 he won the Northern Championships at Manchester and the East of England Championships at Felixstowe on grass.

In October 1937 he was narrowly defeated in three sets by World no. 1 Don Budge at the Pacific Coast Championships in Berkeley. He won his final singles title at the Japan International Championships on clay in Tokyo in October 1938 which was his third at the event (1933–34). He played his last tournament at the Newport Casino Invitational in August 1953 losing to Ken Rosewall in straight sets.

He was ranked No. 8 in the world by A. Wallis Myers of The Daily Telegraph in 1938.

In a 1934 article Fred Perry compared Yamagishi's playing style to Sato and stated that his service was superior to Sato's.
