= Ricardo Morales (tennis) =

Cuban tennis player

- Country (sports): Cuba
- Born: February 1, 1907 Havana, Cuba
- Died: February 28, 2007 (aged 100) Jacksonville, Florida, US
- Turned pro: 1928 (amateur)
- Retired: 1943

Singles
- Career titles: 4

Grand Slam singles results
- US Open: 1R 1928

Team competitions
- Davis Cup: 1929 (0-6); 1932 (3-6); 1933 (6-8)

Ricardo Morales (February 1, 1907 – February 28, 2007) was a Cuban professional tennis player.

== Career ==
Morales competed on the Caribbean Circuit during the 1920s and 1930s. He played his first tournament at the 1928 U.S. National Championships. In 1933 he won the first of three titles at the Cuban International Championships, also known as the Havana International, the other titles coming in 1936 and 1939.

Morales was also a finalist at the Bahamas International Championships in 1936, a finalist at the Jamaican International Championships in 1937, and a finalist at the Cuban Indoor Championships in 1943. He played his last tournament at the Cuban International where he reached the final for the fourth time before retiring.

In team tennis, he was part of the Cuba Davis Cup team, and took part in such tournaments as the 1929 Davis Cup, 1932 International Lawn Tennis Challenge, and 1933 Davis Cup.
