= Mount Royal Tennis Club =

Coordinates: 45.5153°N 73.6433°W

The Mount Royal Tennis Club has been the most-used venue for Canada hosting Davis Cup ties. It has been the country's most prominent grass court Davis Cup venue.

The MRTC has played host to 28 Davis Cup ties between 1923 and 1964. All but the last of these ties was played on grass courts—the 1964 tie was played on clay. Only three other Davis Cup ties played in Canada have ever been on grass, one held at the Toronto Cricket, Skating and Curling Club in 1952, one at the Victoria Lawn Tennis Club on Vancouver Island in 1956, and one held at the Hollyburn Country Club in Vancouver in 1992.

As of 2009, the club has been operating for 102 years.
