= Tadeusz Nowicki =

Tadeusz Nowicki may refer to:

- Tadeusz Nowicki (tennis)
- Tadeusz Nowicki (industrialist)
