= Ergis =

Ergis may refer to:

- Ergis (company), or Ergis Spółka Akcyjna, Polish chemical company that processes plastics and manufactures PVC, PET and PE products
- Ergis Mersini (born 1988), Albanian footballer

== See also ==
- Ergi (disambiguation)
