= 1979 Nations Cup (tennis) =

- Date: 7–14 May
- Edition: 3rd
- Category: Grand Prix circuit
- Draw: 8 teams
- Prize money: $250,000
- Surface: Clay / outdoor
- Location: Düsseldorf, West Germany
- Venue: Rochusclub

Champions
- Australia
| ← 1978 · | Nations Cup | · 1980 → |

The 1979 Nations Cup, also known by its sponsored name Ambre Solaire Nations Cup, was a men's team tennis tournament played on outdoor clay courts. It was the third edition of the World Team Cup and was part of the 1979 Grand Prix circuit. It took place at the Rochusclub in Düsseldorf in Germany from 7 May through 14 May 1979. Total prize money was $250,000 and in total 44,500 people attended the event. Spain were the defending champions but did not compete that year. Australia defeated Italy in the final, which was delayed by one day due to rain, to win the title for the first time.

The draw consisted of eight teams divided over two round-robin groups. The two best ranked teams from each group proceeded to the semifinals. Each match consisted of two singles and a doubles.

== Players ==
=== Section A ===
Argentina

- Ricardo Cano
- José Luis Clerc

United Kingdom

- Mark Cox
- John Lloyd
- Buster Mottram

Italy

- Corrado Barazzutti
- Paolo Bertolucci
- Adriano Panatta

Spain

- José Higueras
- Manuel Orantes

=== Section B ===
Australia

- John Alexander
- Phil Dent
- Kevin Warwick

Germany

- Rolf Gehring
- Uli Pinner
- Andreas Maurer
- Werner Zirngibl

Mexico

- Marcello Lara
- Emilio Montano
- Raúl Ramírez

United States

- Arthur Ashe
- Eddie Dibbs
- Stan Smith
- Harold Solomon

== Round robin ==
=== Section A ===
==== Standings ====
| Pos. | Country | Points | Matches | Sets |
|---|---|---|---|---|
| 1 | Italy | 3–0 | 7–1 | 14–5 |
| 2 | Argentina | 2–1 | 5–4 | 12–9 |
| 3 | Spain | 1–2 | 3–6 | 8–12 |
| 4 | Great Britain | 0–3 | 2–6 | 5–13 |

==== Italy vs. Spain ====
Italy
3
Düsseldorf, Germany
May 1979
Clay

Spain
0

| | | | 1 | 2 | 3 |
|---|---|---|---|---|---|
| 1 | (Italy) (Spain) | Adriano Panatta; Manuel Orantes | 7; 6 | 6; 0 |
| 2 | (Italy) (Spain) | Paolo Bertolucci; José Higueras | 6; 3 | 6; 4 |
| 3 | (Italy) (Spain) | Paolo Bertolucci / Adriano Panatta; José Higueras / Manuel Orantes | 7; 5 | 6; 2 |

==== Argentina vs. Great Britain ====
Argentina
2
Düsseldorf, Germany
May 1979
Clay

Great Britain
1

| | | | 1 | 2 | 3 |
|---|---|---|---|---|---|
| 1 | (Argentina) (United Kingdom) | Ricardo Cano; John Lloyd | 6; 4 | 7; 5 |
| 2 | (Argentina) (United Kingdom) | José Luis Clerc; Buster Mottram | 6; 3 | 7; 5 |
| 3 | (Argentina) (United Kingdom) | Ricardo Cano / José Luis Clerc; Mark Cox / John Lloyd | 2; 6 | 2; 6 |

==== Spain vs. Great Britain ====
Spain
2
Düsseldorf, Germany
May 1979
Clay

Great Britain
1

| | | | 1 | 2 | 3 |
|---|---|---|---|---|---|
| 1 | (Spain) (United Kingdom) | José Higueras; John Lloyd | 6; 2 | 6; 4 |
| 2 | (Spain) (United Kingdom) | Manuel Orantes; Buster Mottram | 5; 7 | 6; 1 | 1; 6 |
| 3 | (Spain) (United Kingdom) | José Higueras / Manuel Orantes; John Lloyd / Buster Mottram | 6; 4 | 6; 3 |

==== Italy vs. Argentina ====
Italy
2
Düsseldorf, Germany
May 1979
Clay

Argentina
1

| | | | 1 | 2 | 3 |
|---|---|---|---|---|---|
| 1 | (Italy) (Argentina) | Adriano Panatta; Ricardo Cano | 4; 6 | 6; 3 | 6; 1 |
| 2 | (Italy) (Argentina) | Corrado Barazzutti; José Luis Clerc | 6; 7 | 0; 6 |
| 3 | (Italy) (Argentina) | Paolo Bertolucci / Adriano Panatta; Ricardo Cano / José Luis Clerc | 6; 4 | 6; 7 | 6; 3 |

==== Italy vs. Great Britain ====
Italy
2
Düsseldorf, Germany
May 1979
Clay

Great Britain
0

| | | | 1 | 2 | 3 |
|---|---|---|---|---|---|
| 1 | (Italy) (United Kingdom) | Paolo Bertolucci; John Lloyd | 6; 1 | 6; 4 |
| 2 | (Italy) (United Kingdom) | Corrado Barazzutti; Buster Mottram | 2; 6 | 7; 5 | 6; 2 |
| 3 | (Italy) (United Kingdom) |

==== Argentina vs. Spain ====
Argentina
2
Düsseldorf, Germany
May 1979
Clay

Spain
1

| | | | 1 | 2 | 3 |
|---|---|---|---|---|---|
| 1 | (Argentina) (Spain) | Ricardo Cano; José Higueras | 2; 6 | 2; 6 |
| 2 | (Argentina) (Spain) | José Luis Clerc; Manuel Orantes | 6; 4 | 4; 6 | 6; 3 |
| 3 | (Argentina) (Spain) | Ricardo Cano / José Luis Clerc; José Higueras / Manuel Orantes | 6; 2 | 6; 2 |

=== Section B ===
==== Standings ====
| Pos. | Country | Points | Matches | Sets |
|---|---|---|---|---|
| 1 | Australia | 3–0 | 7–2 | 15–9 |
| 2 | United States | 2–1 | 6–3 | 14–8 |
| 3 | Germany | 1–2 | 3–6 | 8–13 |
| 4 | Mexico | 0–3 | 2–7 | 9–16 |

==== Australia vs. Germany ====
Australia
2
Düsseldorf, Germany
May 1979
Clay

Germany
1

| | | | 1 | 2 | 3 |
|---|---|---|---|---|---|
| 1 | (Australia) (Germany) | Kim Warwick; Rolf Gehring | 2; 6 | 2; 6 |
| 2 | (Australia) (Germany) | John Alexander; Uli Pinner | 6; 1 | 6; 3 |
| 3 | (Australia) (Germany) | John Alexander / Phil Dent; Uli Pinner / Werner Zirngibl | 6; 2 | 1; 6 | 6; 2 |

==== USA vs. Mexico ====
United States
3
Düsseldorf, Germany
May 1979
Clay

Mexico
0

| | | | 1 | 2 | 3 |
|---|---|---|---|---|---|
| 1 | (United States) (Mexico) | Eddie Dibbs; Marcello Lara | 4; 6 | 6; 2 | 6; 3 |
| 2 | (United States) (Mexico) | Harold Solomon; Raúl Ramírez | 7; 5 | 6; 0 |
| 3 | (United States) (Mexico) | Arthur Ashe / Stan Smith; Marcello Lara / Raúl Ramírez | 3; 6 | 6; 4 | 7; 5 |

==== Australia vs. USA ====
Australia
3
Düsseldorf, Germany
May 1979
Clay

United States
0

| | | | 1 | 2 | 3 |
|---|---|---|---|---|---|
| 1 | (Australia) (United States) | Kim Warwick; Eddie Dibbs | 6; 2 | 6; 2 |
| 2 | (Australia) (United States) | John Alexander; Arthur Ashe | 4; 6 | 6; 3 | 6; 2 |
| 3 | (Australia) (United States) | John Alexander / Phil Dent; Arthur Ashe / Stan Smith | 4; 6 | 7; 6 | 7; 6 |

==== Germany vs. Mexico ====
Germany
2
Düsseldorf, Germany
May 1979
Clay

Mexico
1

| | | | 1 | 2 | 3 |
|---|---|---|---|---|---|
| 1 | (Germany) (Mexico) | Uli Pinner; Raúl Ramírez | 7; 5 | 4; 6 | 7; 5 |
| 2 | (Germany) (Mexico) | Rolf Gehring; Emilio Montano | 7; 6 | 6; 3 |
| 3 | (Germany) (Mexico) | Rolf Gehring / Werner Zirngibl; Emilio Montano / Raúl Ramírez | 6; 4 | 4; 6 | 0; 6 |

==== USA vs. Germany ====
United States
3
Düsseldorf, Germany
May 1979
Clay

Germany
0

| | | | 1 | 2 | 3 |
|---|---|---|---|---|---|
| 1 | (United States) (Germany) | Eddie Dibbs; Rolf Gehring | 6; 3 | 6; 2 |
| 2 | (United States) (Germany) | Harold Solomon; Uli Pinner | 7; 6 | 6; 4 |
| 3 | (United States) (Germany) | Arthur Ashe / Stan Smith; Andreas Maurer / Werner Zirngibl | 6; 0 | 6; 3 |

==== Australia vs. Mexico ====
Australia
2
Düsseldorf, Germany
May 1979
Clay

Mexico
1

| | | | 1 | 2 | 3 |
|---|---|---|---|---|---|
| 1 | (Australia) (Mexico) | John Alexander; Raúl Ramírez | 6; 3 | 1; 6 | 7; 6 |
| 2 | (Australia) (Mexico) | Phil Dent; Marcello Lara | 6; 3 | 4; 6 | 6; 4 |
| 3 | (Australia) (Mexico) | John Alexander / Phil Dent; Marcello Lara / Raúl Ramírez | 3; 6 | 6; 4 | 6; 7 |

== Semifinal ==
=== Australia vs. Argentina ===
Australia
2
Düsseldorf, Germany
May 1979
Clay

Argentina
1

| | | | 1 | 2 | 3 |
|---|---|---|---|---|---|
| 1 | (Australia) (Argentina) | Kevin Warwick; Ricardo Cano | 1; 6 | 3; 6 |
| 2 | (Australia) (Argentina) | John Alexander; José Luis Clerc | 4; 6 | 7; 6 | 7; 5 |
| 3 | (Australia) (Argentina) | John Alexander / Phil Dent; Ricardo Cano / José Luis Clerc | 6; 0 | 6; 0 |

=== Italy vs. USA ===
Italy
3
Düsseldorf, Germany
May 1979
Clay

United States
0

| | | | 1 | 2 | 3 |
|---|---|---|---|---|---|
| 1 | (Italy) (United States) | Adriano Panatta; Eddie Dibbs | 6; 3 | 6; 0 |
| 2 | (Italy) (United States) | Corrado Barazzutti; Arthur Ashe | 6; 2 | 6; 2 |
| 3 | (Italy) (United States) | Paolo Bertolucci / Adriano Panatta; Arthur Ashe / Stan Smith | 6; 4 | 6; 4 |

== Final ==
=== Australia vs. Italy ===
Australia
2
Düsseldorf, Germany
14 May 1979
Clay

Italy
1

| | | | 1 | 2 | 3 |
|---|---|---|---|---|---|
| 1 | (Australia) (Italy) | John Alexander; Corrado Barazzutti | 6; 2 | 6; 0 |
| 2 | (Australia) (Italy) | Phil Dent; Adriano Panatta | 3; 6 | 3; 6 |
| 3 | (Australia) (Italy) | John Alexander / Phil Dent; Paolo Bertolucci / Adriano Panatta | 6; 3 | 7; 6 |

== See also ==
- 1979 Davis Cup
