= 2007 ARAG World Team Cup =

2007 World Team Cup
- Date: 20–26 May
- Edition: 29th
- Category: World Team Cup
- Surface: Clay / outdoor
- Location: Düsseldorf, Germany
- Venue: Rochusclub

Champions
- Argentina
- World Team Cup

The 2007 ARAG World Team Cup was a tennis tournament play on outdoor clay courts. It was the 29th edition of the World Team Cup, and was part of the 250 series of the 2007 ATP Tour. It took place at the Rochusclub in Düsseldorf, Germany, from 20 May through 26 May 2007.

Croatia were the defending champions but they didn't participate in this edition. Argentina defeated Czech Republic in the final, by two rubbers to one for their third title.

== Blue group ==
=== Standings ===
Pos.	Country	Points	Matches	Sets
1.	Czech Republic	3 – 0	7 – 2	15 – 5
2.	Spain	2 – 1	6 – 3	13 – 7
3.	Germany	1 – 2	4 – 5	8 – 11
4.	Belgium	0 – 3	1 – 8	4 – 17

=== Germany vs. Belgium ===
Germany
3
Düsseldorf, Germany
20 May 2007
clay

Belgium
0

			1	2	3
1	(Germany) (Belgium)	Philipp Kohlschreiber; Olivier Rochus	6; 3	1; 6	6; 1
2	(Germany) (Belgium)	Florian Mayer; Kristof Vliegen	6; 3	6; 4
3	(Germany) (Belgium)	Michael Kohlmann / Alexander Waske; Olivier Rochus / Steve Darcis	7^{7} 6^{5}	7; 5

=== Czech Republic vs. Spain ===
Czech Republic
2
Düsseldorf, Germany
21 May 2007
clay

Spain
1

			1	2	3
1	(Czech Republic) (Spain)	Tomáš Berdych; David Ferrer	1; 6	3; 6
2	(Czech Republic) (Spain)	Jan Hájek; Tomeu Salvà	6; 2	6; 4
3	(Czech Republic) (Spain)	Tomáš Berdych / Martin Damm; David Ferrer / Tomeu Salvà	5; 7	6; 3	10; 8

=== Germany vs. Spain ===
Germany
1
Düsseldorf, Germany
23 May 2007
clay

Spain
2

			1	2	3
1	(Germany) (Spain)	Philipp Kohlschreiber; David Ferrer	3; 6	5; 7
2	(Germany) (Spain)	Florian Mayer; Nicolás Almagro	4; 6	4; 6
3	(Germany) (Spain)	Michael Kohlmann / Alexander Waske; Nicolás Almagro / Tomeu Salvà	7; 6	6; 3

=== Belgium vs. Czech Republic ===
Belgium
1
Düsseldorf, Germany
23 May 2007
clay

Czech Republic
2

			1	2	3
1	(Belgium) (Czech Republic)	Olivier Rochus; Tomáš Berdych	3; 6	0; 6
2	(Belgium) (Czech Republic)	Kristof Vliegen; Jan Hájek	6; 7	4; 6
3	(Belgium) (Czech Republic)	Steve Darcis / Olivier Rochus; Tomáš Berdych / Martin Damm	6; 4	3; 6	10; 7

=== Germany vs. Czech Republic ===
Germany
0
Düsseldorf, Germany
25 May 2007
clay

Czech Republic
3

			1	2	3
1	(Germany) (Czech Republic)	Philipp Kohlschreiber; Tomáš Berdych	3; 6	2; 6
2	(Germany) (Czech Republic)	Florian Mayer; Jan Hájek	6^{5} 7^{7}	2; 6
3	(Germany) (Czech Republic)	Benjamin Becker / Michael Kohlmann; Tomáš Berdych / Martin Damm	4; 6	4; 6

=== Belgium vs. Spain ===
Belgium
0
Düsseldorf, Germany
25 May 2007
clay

Spain
3

			1	2	3
1	(Belgium) (Spain)	Olivier Rochus; David Ferrer	3; 6	4; 6
2	(Belgium) (Spain)	Kristof Vliegen; Nicolás Almagro	2; 6	1; 6
3	(Belgium) (Spain)	Steve Darcis / Olivier Rochus; David Ferrer / Tomeu Salvà	3; 6	6; 3	8; 10

== Red group ==
=== Standings ===
Pos.	Country	Points	Matches	Sets
1.	Argentina	2 – 1	6 – 3	13 – 8
2.	Chile	2 – 1	4 – 5	9 – 12
3.	Sweden	1 – 2	4 – 5	12 – 11
4.	United States	1 – 2	4 – 5	9 – 12

=== Argentina vs. Sweden ===
Argentina
2
Düsseldorf, Germany
20 May 2007
clay

Sweden
1

			1	2	3
1	(Argentina) (Sweden)	Juan Ignacio Chela; Robin Söderling	1; 6	4; 6
2	(Argentina) (Sweden)	José Acasuso; Jonas Björkman	6^{4} 7^{7}	7^{10} 6^{8}	6; 4
3	(Argentina) (Sweden)	Agustín Calleri / Juan Ignacio Chela; Jonas Björkman / Thomas Johansson	6; 4	4; 6	10; 6

=== United States vs. Chile ===
United States
1
Düsseldorf, Germany
21 May 2007
clay

Chile
2

			1	2	3
1	(United States) (Chile)	James Blake; Fernando González	4; 6	5; 7
2	(United States) (Chile)	Mardy Fish; Nicolás Massú	4; 6	6^{1} 7^{7}
3	(United States) (Chile)	Mike Bryan / Bob Bryan; Jorge Aguilar / Julio Peralta	6; 1	6; 2

=== United States vs. Argentina ===
United States
2
Düsseldorf, Germany
22 May 2007
clay

Argentina
1

			1	2	3
1	(United States) (Argentina)	James Blake; Agustín Calleri	2; 6	6; 3	6; 4
2	(United States) (Argentina)	Mardy Fish; José Acasuso	5; 7	4; 6
3	(United States) (Argentina)	Mike Bryan / Bob Bryan; Agustín Calleri / Juan Ignacio Chela	6; 2	6; 1

=== Chile vs. Sweden ===
Chile
2
Düsseldorf, Germany
22 & 23 May 2007
clay

Sweden
1

			1	2	3
1	(Chile) (Sweden)	Nicolás Massú; Jonas Björkman	7; 5	6; 7	6; 0
2	(Chile) (Sweden)	Fernando González; Robin Söderling	4; 6	7; 5	6; 4
3	(Chile) (Sweden)	Fernando González / Nicolás Massú; Jonas Björkman / Thomas Johansson	7; 5	3; 6	7; 10

=== Sweden vs. United States ===
Sweden
2
Düsseldorf, Germany
24 May 2007
clay

United States
1

			1	2	3
1	(Sweden) (United States)	Thomas Johansson; Mike Bryan	6; 3	6; 3
2	(Sweden) (United States)	Robin Söderling; James Blake	6; 3	6; 3
3	(Sweden) (United States)	Thomas Johansson / Robin Söderling; Bob Bryan / Mike Bryan	2; 6	1; 6

=== Argentina vs. Chile ===
Argentina
3
Düsseldorf, Germany
24 May 2007
clay

Chile
0

			1	2	3
1	(Argentina) (Chile)	Juan Ignacio Chela; Fernando González	6; 3	7; 5
2	(Argentina) (Chile)	José Acasuso; Nicolás Massú	6; 3	6; 4
3	(Argentina) (Chile)	Agustín Calleri / Sebastián Prieto; Jorge Aguilar / Julio Peralta	6; 4	7; 5

== Final ==
=== Argentina vs. Czech Republic ===
Argentina
2
Düsseldorf, Germany
26 May 2007
clay

Czech Republic
1

			1	2	3
1	(Argentina) (Czech Republic)	Juan Ignacio Chela; Tomáš Berdych	6; 3	3; 6	6^{5} 7^{7}
2	(Argentina) (Czech Republic)	Agustín Calleri; Jan Hájek	6; 3	6; 1
3	(Argentina) (Czech Republic)	José Acasuso / Agustín Calleri; Tomáš Berdych / Martin Damm	2; 6	6; 4	10; 4
