= 2003 ARAG World Team Cup =

2003 World Team Cup
- Date: 18–24 May
- Edition: 25th
- Category: World Team Cup
- Surface: Clay / outdoor
- Location: Düsseldorf, Germany
- Venue: Rochusclub

Champions
- Chile
- World Team Cup

The 2003 ARAG World Team Cup was a tennis tournament played on outdoor clay courts. It was the 25th edition of the World Team Cup and was part of the International Series of the 2003 ATP Tour. It took place at the Rochusclub in Düsseldorf in Germany from May 18 through May 24, 2003.

Argentina were the defending champions but were eliminated in the round robin stage.

Chile defeated the Czech Republic in the final to win the title for the first time.

== Players ==
=== Red group ===
Australia

- Wayne Arthurs (# 22 Doubles)
- Lleyton Hewitt (# 1)
- Mark Philippoussis (# 67)
- Todd Reid (# 298)

Czech Republic

- Jiří Novák (# 10)
- Radek Štěpánek (# 24 Doubles)

Spain

- Àlex Corretja (# 17)
- Carlos Moyá (# 4)
- Fernando Vicente (# 52)

United States

- James Blake (# 25)
- Mardy Fish (# 51)
- Todd Martin (# 93)
- Graydon Oliver (# 44 Doubles)

=== Blue group ===
Argentina

- Lucas Arnold (# 46 Doubles)
- Gastón Gaudio (# 29)
- David Nalbandian (# 13)

Chile

- Fernando González (# 23)
- Nicolás Massú (# 83)
- Marcelo Ríos (# 43)

Germany

- Tomas Behrend (# 101)
- Lars Burgsmüller (# 98)
- Michael Kohlmann (# 51 Doubles)
- Rainer Schüttler (# 11)

Sweden

- Jonas Björkman (# 8 Doubles)
- Thomas Enqvist (# 97)
- Magnus Norman (# 82)

== Round robin ==
=== Red group ===
==== Standings ====
Pos.	Country	Points	Matches	Sets
1	Czech Republic	3–0	6–3	13–8
2	Australia	1–2	5–4	11–7
3	Spain	1–2	4–5	10–11
4	United States	1–2	3–6	7–13

==== Spain vs. United States ====
Spain
1
Düsseldorf, Germany
18 May 2003
Clay

United States
2

			1	2	3
1	(Spain) (United States)	Carlos Moyá; James Blake	7^{7} 6^{2}	7; 5
2	(Spain) (United States)	Àlex Corretja; Todd Martin	3; 6	4; 6
3	(Spain) (United States)	Àlex Corretja / Fernando Vicente; James Blake / Mardy Fish	2; 6	6^{9} 7^{11}

==== Australia vs. Czech Republic ====
Australia
1
Düsseldorf, Germany
18 May 2003
Clay

Czech Republic
2

			1	2	3
1	(Australia) (Czech Republic)	Lleyton Hewitt; Jiří Novák	6; 3	6; 2
2	(Australia) (Czech Republic)	Wayne Arthurs; Radek Štěpánek	6^{1} 7^{7}	3; 6
3	(Australia) (Czech Republic)	Wayne Arthurs / Lleyton Hewitt; Jiří Novák / Radek Štěpánek	4; 6	4; 6

==== Spain vs. Czech Republic ====
Spain
1
Düsseldorf, Germany
20 May 2003
Clay

Czech Republic
2

			1	2	3
1	(Spain) (Czech Republic)	Àlex Corretja; Radek Štěpánek	6; 4	6; 4
2	(Spain) (Czech Republic)	Carlos Moyá; Jiří Novák	6; 4	6^{5} 7^{7}	2; 6
3	(Spain) (Czech Republic)	Àlex Corretja / Carlos Moyá; Jiří Novák / Radek Štěpánek	3; 6	4; 6

==== Australia vs. United States ====
Australia
3
Düsseldorf, Germany
20 May 2003
Clay

United States
0

			1	2	3
1	(Australia) (United States)	Lleyton Hewitt; James Blake	6; 3	6; 3
2	(Australia) (United States)	Wayne Arthurs; Todd Martin	7^{7} 6^{4}	7; 5
3	(Australia) (United States)	Wayne Arthurs / Todd Reid; Mardy Fish / Graydon Oliver	6; 4	6; 2

==== Spain vs. Australia ====
Spain
2
Düsseldorf, Germany
22 May 2003
Clay

Australia
1

			1	2	3
1	(Spain) (Australia)	Carlos Moyá; Lleyton Hewitt	2; 6	6; 3	3; 6
2	(Spain) (Australia)	Àlex Corretja; Wayne Arthurs	3; 6	7; 5	7; 5
3	(Spain) (Australia)	Àlex Corretja / Fernando Vicente; Mark Philippoussis / Todd Reid	6; 1	6; 1

==== Czech Republic vs. United States ====
Czech Republic
2
Düsseldorf, Germany
22 May 2003
Clay

United States
1

			1	2	3
1	(Czech Republic) (United States)	Jiří Novák; James Blake	5; 7	6; 4	3; 6
2	(Czech Republic) (United States)	Radek Štěpánek; Todd Martin	6; 2	7; 5
3	(Czech Republic) (United States)	Jiří Novák / Radek Štěpánek; James Blake / Mardy Fish	6; 3	4; 6	6; 1

=== Blue group ===
==== Standings ====
Pos.	Country	Points	Matches	Sets
1	Chile	3–0	8–1	17–3
2	Argentina	2–1	6–3	12–9
3	Germany	1–2	4–5	9–13
4	Sweden	0–3	0–9	4–17

==== Argentina vs. Sweden ====
Argentina
3
Düsseldorf, Germany
19 May 2003
Clay

Sweden
0

			1	2	3
1	(Argentina) (Sweden)	David Nalbandian; Jonas Björkman	6; 2	6; 2
2	(Argentina) (Sweden)	Gastón Gaudio; Thomas Enqvist	4; 6	6; 4	7^{7} 6^{4}
3	(Argentina) (Sweden)	Lucas Arnold / David Nalbandian; Jonas Björkman / Thomas Enqvist	6^{2} 7^{7}	7^{7} 6^{4}	6; 2

==== Germany vs. Chile ====
Germany
1
Düsseldorf, Germany
19 May 2003
Clay

Chile
2

			1	2	3
1	(Germany) (Chile)	Lars Burgsmüller; Fernando González	4; 6	6^{6} 7^{8}
2	(Germany) (Chile)	Tomas Behrend; Marcelo Ríos	3; 6	7; 5	7^{7} 6^{2}
3	(Germany) (Chile)	Michael Kohlmann / Rainer Schüttler; Fernando González / Nicolás Massú	6; 1	2; 6	0; 6

==== Argentina vs. Germany ====
Argentina
3
Düsseldorf, Germany
21 May 2003
Clay

Germany
0

			1	2	3
1	(Argentina) (Germany)	David Nalbandian; Rainer Schüttler	6; 4	7; 5
2	(Argentina) (Germany)	Gastón Gaudio; Tomas Behrend	6; 2	6; 4
3	(Argentina) (Germany)	Lucas Arnold / David Nalbandian; Lars Burgsmüller / Michael Kohlmann	6; 2	0; 6	6; 2

==== Chile vs. Sweden ====
Chile
3
Düsseldorf, Germany
21 May 2003
Clay

Sweden
0

			1	2	3
1	(Chile) (Sweden)	Nicolás Massú; Thomas Enqvist	6; 2	6; 3
2	(Chile) (Sweden)	Fernando González; Magnus Norman	6; 2	6; 3
3	(Chile) (Sweden)	Fernando González / Nicolás Massú; Jonas Björkman / Magnus Norman	6; 4	6; 2

==== Germany vs. Sweden ====
Germany
3
Düsseldorf, Germany
23 May 2003
Clay

Sweden
0

			1	2	3
1	(Germany) (Sweden)	Rainer Schüttler; Magnus Norman	6; 1	6; 3
2	(Germany) (Sweden)	Lars Burgsmüller; Thomas Enqvist	5; 7	6; 4	6; 4
3	(Germany) (Sweden)	Tomas Behrend / Michael Kohlmann; Thomas Enqvist / Magnus Norman	6^{5} 7^{7}	5; 0		retired

==== Argentina vs. Chile ====
Argentina
0
Düsseldorf, Germany
23 May 2003
Clay

Chile
3

			1	2	3
1	(Argentina) (Chile)	David Nalbandian; Fernando González	4; 6	5; 7
2	(Argentina) (Chile)	Gastón Gaudio; Marcelo Ríos	3; 6	3; 6
3	(Argentina) (Chile)	Lucas Arnold / David Nalbandian; Fernando González / Nicolás Massú	3; 6	0; 1		retired

== Final ==
=== Czech Republic vs. Chile ===
Czech Republic
1
Düsseldorf, Germany
24 May 2003
Clay

Chile
2

			1	2	3
1	(Czech Republic) (Chile)	Jiří Novák; Fernando González	6^{4} 7^{7}	6^{5} 7^{7}
2	(Czech Republic) (Chile)	Radek Štěpánek; Marcelo Ríos	6; 3	7^{7} 6^{5}
3	(Czech Republic) (Chile)	Jiří Novák / Radek Štěpánek; Fernando González / Nicolás Massú	4; 6	2; 6

== See also ==
- Davis Cup
- Hopman Cup
