= 2004 World Team Cup =

- Date: 16–22 May
- Edition: 26th
- Category: World Team Cup
- Surface: Clay / outdoor
- Location: Düsseldorf, Germany
- Venue: Rochusclub

Champions
- Chile
- World Team Cup

The 2004 ARAG World Team Cup was a tennis tournament play on outdoor clay courts. It was the 26th edition of the World Team Cup, and was part of the 2004 ATP Tour. It took place at the Rochusclub in Düsseldorf, Germany, from 16 May through 21 May 2004.

Chile were the defending champions, and they won the title again, defeating Australia in the final by two rubbers to one.

== Squads ==
=== Blue group ===
Australia

- Wayne Arthurs (# 12 Doubles)
- Paul Hanley (# 8 Doubles)
- Lleyton Hewitt (# 12)
- Mark Philippoussis (# 18)

Argentina

- Lucas Arnold Ker (# 27 Doubles)
- Juan Ignacio Chela (# 23)
- Gastón Gaudio (# 44)
- Mariano Zabaleta (# 31)

Netherlands

- Sjeng Schalken (# 15)
- John van Lottum (# 96)
- Martin Verkerk (# 19)

United States

- Bob Bryan (# 1 Doubles)
- Mike Bryan (# 1 Doubles)
- Robby Ginepri (# 39)
- Vince Spadea (# 28)

=== Red group ===
Chile

- Adrián García (# 122)
- Fernando González (# 16)
- Nicolás Massú (# 11)

Czech Republic

- Jiří Novák (# 14)
- Radek Štěpánek (# 59)

Germany

- Tommy Haas (# 114)
- Nicolas Kiefer (# 34)
- Rainer Schüttler (# 7)

Spain

- Galo Blanco (# 93)
- Àlex Corretja (# 94)
- Albert Costa (# 27)
- Feliciano López (# 24)

- Rankings are as of May 17, 2004.

== Round robin ==
=== Blue group ===
==== Standings ====
Pos.	Country	Points	Matches	Sets
1.	Australia	3	7–2	15–9
2.	Argentina	2	6–3	14–12
3.	United States	1	4–5	12–12
4.	Netherlands	0	1–8	8–16

==== Australia vs. United States ====
Australia
2
Düsseldorf, Germany
17 May 2004
clay

United States
1

			1	2	3
1	(Australia) (United States)	Mark Philippoussis; Vince Spadea	6^{1} 7^{7}	6; 3	7^{7} 6^{4}
2	(Australia) (United States)	Lleyton Hewitt; Robby Ginepri	7; 5	6^{1} 7^{7}	6; 4
3	(Australia) (United States)	Wayne Arthurs / Paul Hanley; Bob Bryan / Mike Bryan	2; 6	4; 6

==== Netherlands vs. Argentina ====
Netherlands
0
Düsseldorf, Germany
17 May 2004
clay

Argentina
3

			1	2	3
1	(Netherlands) (Argentina)	Sjeng Schalken; Juan Ignacio Chela	3; 6	7; 5	5; 7
2	(Netherlands) (Argentina)	Martin Verkerk; Gastón Gaudio	6; 4	2; 6	4; 6
3	(Netherlands) (Argentina)	John van Lottum / Martin Verkerk; Lucas Arnold Ker / Mariano Zabaleta	6; 3	3; 6	3; 6

==== Australia vs. Netherlands ====
Australia
3
Düsseldorf, Germany
19 May 2004
clay

Netherlands
0

			1	2	3
1	(Australia) (Netherlands)	Mark Philippoussis; Sjeng Schalken	4; 6	7^{7} 6^{5}	7; 5
2	(Australia) (Netherlands)	Lleyton Hewitt; Martin Verkerk	1; 6	7^{7} 6^{2}	7; 5
3	(Australia) (Netherlands)	Wayne Arthurs / Paul Hanley; John van Lottum / Martin Verkerk	6; 4	7^{7} 6^{5}

==== Argentina vs. United States ====
Argentina
2
Düsseldorf, Germany
19 May 2004
clay

United States
1

			1	2	3
1	(Argentina) (United States)	Juan Ignacio Chela; Vince Spadea	6; 3	3; 6	6; 4
2	(Argentina) (United States)	Mariano Zabaleta; Robby Ginepri	6^{5} 7^{7}	6; 3	7; 5
3	(Argentina) (United States)	Lucas Arnold Ker / Gastón Gaudio; Bob Bryan / Mike Bryan	7; 5	1; 6	3; 6

==== Australia vs. Argentina ====
Australia
2
Düsseldorf, Germany
21 May 2004
clay

Argentina
1

			1	2	3
1	(Australia) (Argentina)	Lleyton Hewitt; Gastón Gaudio	3; 6	7; 5	6^{5} 7^{7}
2	(Australia) (Argentina)	Mark Philippoussis; Mariano Zabaleta	4; 6	6; 3	7; 5
3	(Australia) (Argentina)	Wayne Arthurs / Paul Hanley; Lucas Arnold Ker / Juan Ignacio Chela	6; 3	6; 4

==== Netherlands vs. United States ====
Netherlands
1
Düsseldorf, Germany
21 May 2004
clay

United States
2

			1	2	3
1	(Netherlands) (United States)	Martin Verkerk; Vince Spadea	7^{7} 6^{5}	6; 2
2	(Netherlands) (United States)	John van Lottum; Robby Ginepri	5; 7	7^{8} 6^{6}	1; 6
3	(Netherlands) (United States)	Sjeng Schalken / Martin Verkerk; Bob Bryan / Mike Bryan	3; 6	0; 6

=== Red group ===
==== Standings ====
Pos.	Country	Points	Matches	Sets
1.	Chile	3	7–2	13–7
2.	Germany	2	5–4	11–8
3.	Czech Republic	1	5–4	11–8
4.	Spain	0	1–8	3–15

==== Germany vs. Spain ====
Germany
2
Düsseldorf, Germany
16 May 2004
clay

Spain
1

			1	2	3
1	(Germany) (Spain)	Rainer Schüttler; Feliciano López	6; 3	6; 4
2	(Germany) (Spain)	Tommy Haas; Albert Costa	6^{3} 7^{7}	2; 6
3	(Germany) (Spain)	Nicolas Kiefer / Rainer Schüttler; Albert Costa / Àlex Corretja	6; 2	6; 3

==== Chile vs. Czech Republic ====
Chile
2
Düsseldorf, Germany
16 May 2004
clay

Czech Republic
1

			1	2	3
1	(Chile) (Czech Republic)	Nicolás Massú; Jiří Novák	6^{6} 7^{8}	0; 6
2	(Chile) (Czech Republic)	Fernando González; Radek Štěpánek	6; 3	6; 4
3	(Chile) (Czech Republic)	Fernando González / Nicolás Massú; Jiří Novák / Radek Štěpánek	4; 6	6; 2	6; 2

==== Germany vs. Czech Republic ====
Germany
2
Düsseldorf, Germany
18 May 2004
clay

Czech Republic
1

			1	2	3
1	(Germany) (Czech Republic)	Rainer Schüttler; Jiří Novák	6; 4	6; 3
2	(Germany) (Czech Republic)	Nicolas Kiefer; Radek Štěpánek	7^{7} 6^{4}	6; 3
3	(Germany) (Czech Republic)	Nicolas Kiefer / Rainer Schüttler; Jiří Novák / Radek Štěpánek	5; 7	2; 6

==== Chile vs. Spain ====
Chile
3
Düsseldorf, Germany
18 May 2004
clay

Spain
0

			1	2	3
1	(Chile) (Spain)	Nicolás Massú; Albert Costa	4; 1			retired
2	(Chile) (Spain)	Fernando González; Àlex Corretja	6; 4	3; 6	6; 2
3	(Chile) (Spain)	Adrián García / Nicolás Massú; Àlex Corretja / Feliciano López	6; 3	6; 3

==== Chile vs. Germany ====
Chile
2
Düsseldorf, Germany
20 May 2004
clay

Germany
1

			1	2	3
1	(Chile) (Germany)	Nicolás Massú; Rainer Schüttler	6; 4	4; 6	6; 2
2	(Chile) (Germany)	Fernando González; Tommy Haas	6; 4	7^{7} 6^{4}
3	(Chile) (Germany)	Adrián García / Nicolás Massú; Tommy Haas / Rainer Schüttler	5; 7	2; 6

==== Spain vs. Czech Republic ====
Spain
0
Düsseldorf, Germany
20 May 2004
clay

Czech Republic
3

			1	2	3
1	(Spain) (Czech Republic)	Feliciano López; Jiří Novák	6^{3} 7^{7}	1; 6
2	(Spain) (Czech Republic)	Albert Costa; Radek Štěpánek	4; 6	3; 6
3	(Spain) (Czech Republic)	Galo Blanco / Àlex Corretja; Jiří Novák / Radek Štěpánek	0; 6	1; 6

== Final ==
=== Chile vs. Australia ===
Chile
2
Düsseldorf, Germany
22 May 2004
clay

Australia
1

			1	2	3
1	(Chile) (Australia)	Nicolás Massú; Mark Philippoussis	6; 3	6; 1
2	(Chile) (Australia)	Fernando González; Lleyton Hewitt	7; 5	6; 2
3	(Chile) (Australia)	Adrián García / Nicolás Massú; Wayne Arthurs / Paul Hanley	4; 6	4; 6
