= 2011 Power Horse World Team Cup =

Tennis tournament

2011 World Team Cup
- Date: 15–21 May
- Edition: 33rd
- Category: 250 series
- Surface: Clay / outdoor
- Location: Düsseldorf, Germany
- Venue: Rochusclub

Champions
- Germany
- World Team Cup

The 2011 Power Horse World Team Cup was a tennis tournament played on outdoor clay courts. It was the 33rd edition of the World Team Cup, and was part of the 250 series of the 2011 ATP World Tour. It took place at the Rochusclub in Düsseldorf, Germany. After ARAG discontinued sponsorship for the event and organizers failed to find a new sponsor, the 2011 edition of the tournament was cancelled. However a new sponsor (Power Horse) was found in January 2011, and so the 2011 edition of the Cup took place between May 15–21.

Leading the team roster, the defending champions, Argentina, also won in 2007, 2002 and 1980. They were joined by 4-time champions Sweden, Spain and United States, 3-time champions Germany (one additional title by West Germany), one-time champions Serbia (also a part of the 1990 winning team Yugoslavia), 4-time runners-up Russia and newcomers Kazakhstan.

Argentina won all the matches in the Red Group reaching the final where they were joined by Germany winner of Blue Group with a 2–1 record.

Germany won the Cup with a 2–1 win against Argentina, the double match being decisive where Philipp Petzschner and Philipp Kohlschreiber defeated Juan Ignacio Chela and Máximo González 6–3, 7–6^{(7–5)}.

== Points ==
World Team Cup
Match type	1st round	2nd round	3rd round	Finals	Points	Bonus	Total
Singles 1	35	35	35	95	200	50	250
Singles 2	25	25	25	50	125	50	175
Deciding match (doubles)	35	35	35	95	200	50	250
Dead rubber (doubles)	10	10	10	20	50		50

- Players who only play the finals will be awarded points from the previous round.
- Players must win all 4 matches and be part of the winning team in order to earn the Bonus Points.

== Prize money ==
Stage	Singles	Doubles ^{1}
Winning Team (First Place)	€260,000	€10,700
Finalist (Second Place)	€168,000	€9,000
Third Place	€75,000	€6,200
Fourth Place	€75,000	€3,500
Fifth Place	€50,000	€1,800
Sixth Place	€50,000	€950
Seventh Place	€29,000	–
Eight Place	€29,000	–

- Places are decided with the Player Winning the Most Total Doubles Matches

== Players ==
=== Red Group ===
United States

- Mardy Fish (#11)
- Sam Querrey (#25)
- John Isner (#35)

Argentina

- Juan Mónaco (#37)
- Juan Ignacio Chela (#42)
- Máximo González (#83)

Kazakhstan

- Andrey Golubev (#43)
- Mikhail Kukushkin (#62)

Sweden

- Robin Söderling (#5)
- Christian Lindell (#326)
- Robert Lindstedt (#22 Doubles)
- Simon Aspelin (#61 Doubles)

=== Blue Group ===
Serbia

- Viktor Troicki (#15)
- Janko Tipsarević (#33)
- Nenad Zimonjić (#4 Doubles)
- Dušan Lajović (#295)

Germany

- Florian Mayer (#28)
- Philipp Kohlschreiber (#45)
- Philipp Petzschner (#76)
- Christopher Kas (#47 Doubles)

Spain

- Daniel Gimeno-Traver (#46)
- Marcel Granollers (#52)
- Marc López (#24 Doubles)

Russia

- Mikhail Youzhny (#13)
- Dmitry Tursunov (#76)
- Igor Andreev (#105)
- Victor Baluda (#640)

== Round robin ==
=== Red Group ===
==== Standings ====
Pos.	Country	Points	Matches	Sets
1	Argentina	3–0	8–1	16–2
2	United States	2–1	4–5	10–11
3	Sweden	1–2	4–5	9–12
4	Kazakhstan	0–3	2–7	5–15

==== Argentina vs Kazakhstan ====
Argentina
3
Düsseldorf, Germany
15 May 2011
clay

Kazakhstan
0

			1	2	3
1	(Argentina) (Kazakhstan)	Juan Mónaco; Andrey Golubev	6; 4	6; 0
2	(Argentina) (Kazakhstan)	Juan Ignacio Chela; Mikhail Kukushkin	6; 1	6; 2
3	(Argentina) (Kazakhstan)	Máximo González / Juan Mónaco; Andrey Golubev / Mikhail Kukushkin	6; 4	6; 3

==== United States vs Sweden ====
United States
2
Düsseldorf, Germany
16 May 2011
clay

Sweden
1

			1	2	3
1	(United States) (Sweden)	John Isner; Christian Lindell	6; 4	6; 1
2	(United States) (Sweden)	Sam Querrey; Robin Söderling	7; 5	5; 7	6^{4} 7^{7}
3	(United States) (Sweden)	Mardy Fish / John Isner; Simon Aspelin / Robert Lindstedt	4; 6	7^{7} 6^{5}	10; 4

==== United States vs Kazakhstan ====
United States
2
Düsseldorf, Germany
17–18 May 2011
clay

Kazakhstan
1

			1	2	3
1	(United States) (Kazakhstan)	Mardy Fish; Andrey Golubev	6; 4	6; 2
2	(United States) (Kazakhstan)	Sam Querrey; Mikhail Kukushkin	6; 3	5; 7	5; 7
3	(United States) (Kazakhstan)	Mardy Fish / John Isner; Andrey Golubev / Mikhail Kukushkin	6; 3	7^{12} 6^{10}

==== Argentina vs Sweden ====
Argentina
2
Düsseldorf, Germany
17–18 May 2011
clay

Sweden
1

			1	2	3
1	(Argentina) (Sweden)	Máximo González; Robin Söderling	1; 6	4; 6
2	(Argentina) (Sweden)	Juan Ignacio Chela; Christian Lindell	6; 1	6; 1
3	(Argentina) (Sweden)	Juan Ignacio Chela / Juan Mónaco; Simon Aspelin / Robert Lindstedt	7^{7} 6^{1}	6; 0

==== United States vs Argentina ====
United States
0
Düsseldorf, Germany
19–20 May 2011
clay

Argentina
3

			1	2	3
1	(United States) (Argentina)	Mardy Fish; Juan Mónaco	6^{4} 7^{7}	5; 7
2	(United States) (Argentina)	John Isner; Juan Ignacio Chela	1; 6	6^{1} 7^{7}
3	(United States) (Argentina)	John Isner / Sam Querrey; Máximo González / Juan Mónaco	2; 6	4; 6

==== Kazakhstan vs Sweden ====
Kazakhstan
1
Düsseldorf, Germany
19–20 May 2011
clay

Sweden
2

			1	2	3
1	(Kazakhstan) (Sweden)	Mikhail Kukushkin; Christian Lindell	6; 0	6; 1
2	(Kazakhstan) (Sweden)	Andrey Golubev; Robin Söderling	7^{7} 6^{4}	6^{7} 7^{9}	3; 6
3	(Kazakhstan) (Sweden)	Andrey Golubev / Mikhail Kukushkin; Simon Aspelin / Robert Lindstedt	6^{6} 7^{8}	1; 6

=== Blue Group ===
==== Standings ====
Pos.	Country	Points	Matches	Sets
1	Germany	2–1	6–3	13–9
2	Serbia	2–1	4–5	10–11
3	Russia	1–2	4–5	10–12
4	Spain	1–2	4–5	10–11

==== Serbia vs Germany ====
Serbia
0
Düsseldorf, Germany
15–16 May 2011
clay

Germany
3

			1	2	3
1	(Serbia) (Germany)	Janko Tipsarević; Philipp Kohlschreiber	4; 6	6^{5} 7^{7}
2	(Serbia) (Germany)	Viktor Troicki; Florian Mayer	2; 6	2; 6
3	(Serbia) (Germany)	Janko Tipsarević / Nenad Zimonjić; Christopher Kas / Philipp Petzschner	7; 5	3; 6	[7] [10]

==== Spain vs Russia ====
Spain
1
Düsseldorf, Germany
15–16 May 2011
clay

Russia
2

			1	2	3
1	(Spain) (Russia)	Marcel Granollers; Mikhail Youzhny	3; 6	4; 6
2	(Spain) (Russia)	Daniel Gimeno-Traver; Igor Andreev	5; 7	6; 4	6^{6} 7^{8}
3	(Spain) (Russia)	Marcel Granollers / Marc López; Victor Baluda / Dmitry Tursunov	6; 4	6; 2

==== Germany vs Spain ====
Germany
1
Düsseldorf, Germany
17–18 May 2011
clay

Spain
2

			1	2	3
1	(Germany) (Spain)	Florian Mayer; Marcel Granollers	4; 6	6; 4	6; 2
2	(Germany) (Spain)	Philipp Kohlschreiber; Daniel Gimeno-Traver	4; 6	6; 2	3; 6
3	(Germany) (Spain)	Christopher Kas / Philipp Petzschner; Marcel Granollers / Marc López	6^{7} 7^{9}	3; 6

==== Serbia vs Russia ====
Serbia
2
Düsseldorf, Germany
17–18 May 2011
clay

Russia
1

			1	2	3
1	(Serbia) (Russia)	Dušan Lajović; Igor Andreev	1; 6	7^{8} 6^{6}	6; 4
2	(Serbia) (Russia)	Viktor Troicki; Mikhail Youzhny	6; 3	6; 1
3	(Serbia) (Russia)	Janko Tipsarević / Viktor Troicki; Igor Andreev / Dmitry Tursunov	3; 6	6; 4	[5] [10]

==== Germany vs Russia ====
Germany
2
Düsseldorf, Germany
19–20 May 2011
clay

Russia
1

			1	2	3
1	(Germany) (Russia)	Philipp Petzschner; Igor Andreev	6; 2	6; 4
2	(Germany) (Russia)	Philipp Kohlschreiber; Mikhail Youzhny	2; 6	6; 3	6; 2
3	(Germany) (Russia)	Florian Mayer / Philipp Petzschner; Igor Andreev / Dmitry Tursunov	6^{6} 7^{8}	4; 6

==== Serbia vs Spain ====
Serbia
2
Düsseldorf, Germany
19–20 May 2011
clay

Spain
1

			1	2	3
1	(Serbia) (Spain)	Viktor Troicki; Marcel Granollers	6; 4	6; 4
2	(Serbia) (Spain)	Janko Tipsarević; Daniel Gimeno-Traver	7^{7} 6^{5}	6; 1
3	(Serbia) (Spain)	Dušan Lajović / Nenad Zimonjić; Marcel Granollers / Marc López	3; 6	1; 6

== Final ==
=== Germany vs Argentina ===
Germany
2
Düsseldorf, Germany
21 May 2011
clay

Argentina
1

			1	2	3
1	(Germany) (Argentina)	Florian Mayer; Juan Mónaco	7^{7} 6^{4}	6; 0
2	(Germany) (Argentina)	Philipp Kohlschreiber; Juan Ignacio Chela	4; 6	6^{4} 7^{7}
3	(Germany) (Argentina)	Philipp Petzschner / Philipp Kohlschreiber; Juan Ignacio Chela / Máximo González	6; 3	7^{7} 6^{5}

2011 World Team Cup Champions
(Germany)
Germany
Fifth title

== See also ==
- 2011 Davis Cup World Group
- 2011 Hopman Cup
