= 2006 ARAG World Team Cup =

2006 World Team Cup
- Date: 21–27 May
- Edition: 28th
- Category: World Team Cup
- Surface: Clay / outdoor
- Location: Düsseldorf, Germany

Champions
- Croatia
- World Team Cup

The 2006 ARAG World Team Cup was a tennis tournament play on outdoor clay courts. It was the 28th edition of the World Team Cup, and was part of the 2006 ATP Tour. It took place at the Rochusclub in Düsseldorf, Germany, from 21 through 27 May 2006.

Argentina were the defending champions but they failed to advance beyond the group stage. Croatia defeated Germany in the final, by two rubbers to one for their first title.

== Players ==
=== Red group ===
Croatia

- Ivan Ljubičić (# 4)
- Mario Ančić (# 12)
- Ivo Karlović (# 51)

Chile

- Fernando González (# 9)
- Nicolás Massú (# 35)
- Paul Capdeville (# 124)
- Adrián García (# 197 Doubles)

Spain

- David Ferrer (# 15)
- Fernando Verdasco (# 31)
- Feliciano López (# 46)

United States

- Andy Roddick (# 5)
- James Blake (# 8)
- Robby Ginepri (# 17)
- Bob Bryan (# 1 Doubles)
- Mike Bryan (# 1 Doubles)

=== Blue group ===
Germany

- Nicolas Kiefer (# 13)
- Philipp Kohlschreiber (# 83)
- Alexander Waske (# 38 Doubles)
- Michael Kohlmann (# 53 Doubles)

Czech Republic

- Tomáš Berdych (# 20)
- Robin Vik (# 67)
- Leoš Friedl (# 18 Doubles)

Argentina

- David Nalbandian (# 3)
- Gastón Gaudio (# 10)
- José Acasuso (# 29)
- Sebastián Prieto (# 26 Doubles)

Italy

- Filippo Volandri (# 55)
- Davide Sanguinetti (# 65)

- Rankings are as of May 22, 2006

== Round robin ==
=== Red group ===
==== Standings ====
Pos.	Country	Points	Matches	Sets
1	Croatia	3–0	7–2	14–8
2	Chile	2–1	5–4	11–10
3	Spain	1–2	3–6	9–12
4	United States	0–3	3–6	7–11

==== Chile vs. Spain ====
Chile
3
Düsseldorf, Germany
Sunday, May 21, 2006
Red Clay

Spain
0

			1	2	3
1	(Chile) (Spain)	Nicolás Massú; Fernando Verdasco	6; 2	4; 6	6; 4
2	(Chile) (Spain)	Fernando González; David Ferrer	7; 5	6^{6} 7^{8}	6; 3
3	(Chile) (Spain)	Paul Capdeville / Adrián García; Feliciano López / Fernando Verdasco	6; 3	6; 2

==== Croatia vs. United States of America ====
Croatia
2
Düsseldorf, Germany
Monday, May 22, 2006
Red Clay

United States
1

			1	2	3
1	(Croatia) (United States)	Ivan Ljubičić; James Blake	5; 7	6; 3	7^{7} 6^{4}
2	(Croatia) (United States)	Ivo Karlović; Robby Ginepri	4; 6	6^{1} 7^{7}
3	(Croatia) (United States)	Ivo Karlović / Ivan Ljubičić; Bob Bryan / Mike Bryan	6; 3	7^{7} 6^{5}

==== Croatia vs. Spain ====
Croatia
2
Düsseldorf, Germany
Wednesday, May 24, 2006
Red Clay

Spain
1

			1	2	3
1	(Croatia) (Spain)	Ivan Ljubičić; David Ferrer	2; 6	2; 6
2	(Croatia) (Spain)	Mario Ančić; Feliciano López	7; 5	4; 6	6; 4
3	(Croatia) (Spain)	Ivo Karlović / Ivan Ljubičić; Feliciano López / Fernando Verdasco	6; 3	7^{7} 6^{4}

==== Chile vs. United States of America ====
Chile
2
Düsseldorf, Germany
Wednesday, May 24, 2006
Red Clay

United States
1

			1	2	3
1	(Chile) (United States)	Nicolás Massú; Andy Roddick	4; 2			retired
2	(Chile) (United States)	Paul Capdeville; Robby Ginepri	6; 4	6; 4
3	(Chile) (United States)	Fernando González / Nicolás Massú; Bob Bryan / Mike Bryan	4; 6	5; 7

==== Spain vs. United States of America ====
Spain
2
Düsseldorf, Germany
Friday, May 26, 2006
Red Clay

United States
1

			1	2	3
1	(Spain) (United States)	Fernando Verdasco; Bob Bryan	6; 2	3; 6	6; 1
2	(Spain) (United States)	David Ferrer; Robby Ginepri	6; 3	6; 3
3	(Spain) (United States)	Feliciano López / Fernando Verdasco; Bob Bryan / Mike Bryan	3; 4			retired

==== Chile vs. Croatia ====
Chile
0
Düsseldorf, Germany
Friday, May 26, 2006
Red Clay

Croatia
3

			1	2	3
1	(Chile) (Croatia)	Fernando González; Ivan Ljubičić	5; 7	7^{7} 6^{4}	4; 6
2	(Chile) (Croatia)	Nicolás Massú; Mario Ančić	3; 6	2; 6
3	(Chile) (Croatia)	Paul Capdeville / Adrián García; Mario Ančić / Ivo Karlović	5; 7	6; 4	15; 17

=== Blue group ===
==== Standings ====
Pos.	Country	Points	Matches	Sets
1	Germany	3–0	6–3	15–8
2	Czech Republic	2–1	5–4	14–9
3	Argentina	1–2	4–5	8–12
4	Italy	0–3	3–6	6–14

==== Germany vs. Italy ====
Germany
2
Düsseldorf, Germany
Sunday, May 21, 2006
Red Clay

Italy
1

			1	2	3
1	(Germany) (Italy)	Nicolas Kiefer; Filippo Volandri	7^{12} 6^{10}	6; 3
2	(Germany) (Italy)	Philipp Kohlschreiber; Davide Sanguinetti	6; 3	3; 6	4; 6
3	(Germany) (Italy)	Michael Kohlmann / Alexander Waske; Davide Sanguinetti / Filippo Volandri	6; 4	6; 4

==== Argentina vs. Czech Republic ====
Argentina
1
Düsseldorf, Germany
Monday, May 22, 2006
Red Clay

Czech Republic
2

			1	2	3
1	(Argentina) (Czech Republic)	Gastón Gaudio; Robin Vik	6^{5} 7^{7}	3; 6
2	(Argentina) (Czech Republic)	David Nalbandian; Tomáš Berdych	4; 6	4; 6
3	(Argentina) (Czech Republic)	José Acasuso / Sebastián Prieto; Tomáš Berdych / Leoš Friedl	6; 0	2; 6	10; 3

==== Argentina vs. Germany ====
Argentina
1
Düsseldorf, Germany
Tuesday, May 23, 2006
Red Clay

Germany
2

			1	2	3
1	(Argentina) (Germany)	José Acasuso; Alexander Waske	4; 6	6; 4	7^{7} 6^{1}
2	(Argentina) (Germany)	Gastón Gaudio; Nicolas Kiefer	2; 6	3; 6
3	(Argentina) (Germany)	David Nalbandian / Sebastián Prieto; Michael Kohlmann / Alexander Waske	3; 6	3; 6

==== Czech Republic vs. Italy ====
Czech Republic
2
Düsseldorf, Germany
Tuesday, May 23, 2006
Red Clay

Italy
1

			1	2	3
1	(Czech Republic) (Italy)	Tomáš Berdych; Filippo Volandri	6; 1	6; 4
2	(Czech Republic) (Italy)	Robin Vik; Davide Sanguinetti	6^{7} 7^{9}	6; 2	4; 6
3	(Czech Republic) (Italy)	Tomáš Berdych / Leoš Friedl; Davide Sanguinetti / Filippo Volandri	6; 2	6; 1

==== Argentina vs. Italy ====
Argentina
2
Düsseldorf, Germany
Thursday, May 25, 2006
Red Clay

Italy
1

			1	2	3
1	(Argentina) (Italy)	José Acasuso; Davide Sanguinetti	6; 2	6; 0
2	(Argentina) (Italy)	David Nalbandian; Filippo Volandri	4; 6	5; 7
3	(Argentina) (Italy)	José Acasuso / Sebastián Prieto; Davide Sanguinetti / Filippo Volandri	7^{7} 6^{3}	6; 1

==== Czech Republic vs. Germany ====
Czech Republic
1
Düsseldorf, Germany
Thursday, May 25, 2006
Red Clay

Germany
2

			1	2	3
1	(Czech Republic) (Germany)	Robin Vik; Philipp Kohlschreiber	3; 6	6; 3	1; 6
2	(Czech Republic) (Germany)	Tomáš Berdych; Nicolas Kiefer	6^{5} 7^{7}	6; 3	6; 3
3	(Czech Republic) (Germany)	Tomáš Berdych / Leoš Friedl; Michael Kohlmann / Alexander Waske	4; 6	7^{7} 6^{2}	5; 10

== Final ==
=== Croatia vs. Germany ===
Croatia
2
Düsseldorf, Germany
27 May 2006
Red Clay

Germany
1

			1	2	3
1	(Croatia) (Germany)	Ivo Karlović; Alexander Waske	7^{7} 6^{5}	6; 4
2	(Croatia) (Germany)	Ivan Ljubičić; Nicolas Kiefer	6; 4	6; 4
3	(Croatia) (Germany)	Ivo Karlović / Ivan Ljubičić; Michael Kohlmann / Alexander Waske	6^{3} 7^{7}	3; 6

2006 World Team Cup Champions
(Croatia)
Croatia
First title

== See also ==
- 2006 Davis Cup World Group
- 2006 Hopman Cup
