= 2010 ARAG World Team Cup =

Tennis tournament

2010 World Team Cup
- Date: 16–22 May
- Edition: 32nd
- Category: 250 series
- Surface: Clay / outdoor
- Location: Düsseldorf, Germany
- Venue: Rochusclub

Champions
- Argentina
- World Team Cup

The 2010 ARAG World Team Cup was a tennis tournament played on outdoor clay courts. It was the 32nd edition of the World Team Cup, and was part of the 250 series of the 2010 ATP World Tour. It took place at the Rochusclub in Düsseldorf, Germany, from 16 May through 22 May 2010.

Serbia were the defending champions, but they were eliminated in the round robin stage. Argentina defeated the United States in the final, to win the title for the fourth time.

== Players ==
=== Blue Group ===
Argentina

- Juan Mónaco (# 27)
- Eduardo Schwank (# 52)
- Diego Veronelli (without place)
- Horacio Zeballos (# 47)

France

- Jérémy Chardy (# 44)
- Nicolas Mahut (# 157)
- Paul-Henri Mathieu (# 56)

Germany

- Andreas Beck (# 81)
- Christopher Kas (# 33 Doubles)
- Philipp Kohlschreiber (# 29)
- Florian Mayer (# 48)

Serbia

- Filip Krajinović (# 209)
- Dušan Lajović (# 505)
- Viktor Troicki (# 40)
- Nenad Zimonjić (# 3 Doubles)

=== Red Group ===
Australia

- Carsten Ball (#119)
- Paul Hanley (# 15 Doubles)
- Lleyton Hewitt (# 31)
- Peter Luczak (# 71)

Czech Republic

- Tomáš Berdych (# 16)
- Lukáš Dlouhý (# 5 Doubles)
- Jan Hájek (# 86)

Spain

- Nicolás Almagro (# 18)
- Daniel Gimeno-Traver (# 96)
- Marc López (# 25 Doubles)

United States

- Bob Bryan (# 2 Doubles)
- Mike Bryan (# 2 Doubles)
- Robby Ginepri (# 98)
- John Isner (# 19)
- Sam Querrey (# 22)

== Round robin ==
=== Blue Group ===
==== Standings ====
Pos.	Country	Points	Matches	Sets
1	Argentina	3–0	6–3	13–10
2	France	2–1	5–4	13–9
3	Germany	1–2	4–5	10–11
4	Serbia	0–3	3–6	7–13

==== Germany vs France ====
Germany
1
Düsseldorf, Germany
16–17 May 2010
clay

France
2

			1	2	3
1	(Germany) (France)	Philipp Kohlschreiber; Jérémy Chardy	2; 6	4; 6
2	(Germany) (France)	Andreas Beck; Paul-Henri Mathieu	7^{7} 6^{1}	6^{4} 7^{7}	6; 4
3	(Germany) (France)	Philipp Kohlschreiber / Christopher Kas; Jérémy Chardy / Nicolas Mahut	6; 3	3; 6	[5] [10]

==== Argentina vs Serbia ====
Argentina
2
Düsseldorf, Germany
16–17 May 2010
clay

Serbia
1

			1	2	3
1	(Argentina) (Serbia)	Horacio Zeballos; Filip Krajinović	6; 1	6; 4
2	(Argentina) (Serbia)	Juan Mónaco; Viktor Troicki	1; 6	6; 3	7^{7} 6^{3}
3	(Argentina) (Serbia)	Eduardo Schwank / Horacio Zeballos; Viktor Troicki / Nenad Zimonjić	1; 6	6; 3	[6] [10]

==== Argentina vs Germany ====
Argentina
2
Düsseldorf, Germany
18–19 May 2010
clay

Germany
1

			1	2	3
1	(Argentina) (Germany)	Horacio Zeballos; Philipp Kohlschreiber	3; 6	4; 6
2	(Argentina) (Germany)	Eduardo Schwank; Andreas Beck	7; 6	2; 6	6; 3
3	(Argentina) (Germany)	Juan Mónaco / Horacio Zeballos; Christopher Kas / Philipp Kohlschreiber	6; 2	6; 3

==== France vs Serbia ====
France
2
Düsseldorf, Germany
18–19 May 2010
clay

Serbia
1

			1	2	3
1	(France) (Serbia)	Paul-Henri Mathieu; Dušan Lajović	6; 3	6; 4
2	(France) (Serbia)	Jérémy Chardy; Viktor Troicki	4; 6	2; 6
3	(France) (Serbia)	Jérémy Chardy / Nicolas Mahut; Viktor Troicki / Nenad Zimonjić	7^{7} 6^{4}	6; 2

==== Germany vs. Serbia ====
Germany
2
Düsseldorf, Germany
20–21 May 2010
clay

Serbia
1

			1	2	3
1	(Germany) (Serbia)	Philipp Kohlschreiber; Viktor Troicki	7^{7} 6^{1}	6; 4
2	(Germany) (Serbia)	Andreas Beck; Filip Krajinović	7; 5	6; 4
3	(Germany) (Serbia)	Andreas Beck / Florian Mayer; Nenad Zimonjić / Filip Krajinović	3; 6	6^{4} 7^{7}

==== France vs Argentina ====
France
1
Düsseldorf, Germany
20–21 May 2010
clay

Argentina
2

			1	2	3
1	(France) (Argentina)	Jérémy Chardy; Juan Mónaco	6; 3	6; 4
2	(France) (Argentina)	Paul-Henri Mathieu; Eduardo Schwank	6; 3	3; 6	2; 6
3	(France) (Argentina)	Jérémy Chardy / Nicolas Mahut; Juan Mónaco / Horacio Zeballos	5; 7	6; 3	[8] [10]

=== Red Group ===
==== Standings ====
Pos.	Country	Points	Matches	Sets
1	United States	3–0	6–3	14–8
2	Czech Republic	2–1	5–4	11–10
3	Spain	1–2	4–5	10–12
4	Australia	0–3	3–6	8–14

==== Australia vs USA ====
Australia
1
Düsseldorf, Germany
16–17 May 2010
clay

United States
2

			1	2	3
1	(Australia) (United States)	Peter Luczak; Sam Querrey	7^{7} 6^{4}	6^{3} 7^{7}	3; 6
2	(Australia) (United States)	Lleyton Hewitt; John Isner	6; 2	6; 4
3	(Australia) (United States)	Paul Hanley / Carsten Ball; John Isner / Sam Querrey	7; 5	4; 6	[8] [10]

==== Czech Republic vs Spain ====
Czech Republic
2
Düsseldorf, Germany
16–17 May 2010
clay

Spain
1

			1	2	3
1	(Czech Republic) (Spain)	Jan Hájek; Daniel Gimeno-Traver	6; 2	6; 2
2	(Czech Republic) (Spain)	Tomáš Berdych; Nicolás Almagro	6^{4} 7^{7}	6; 4	6; 3
3	(Czech Republic) (Spain)	Tomáš Berdych / Lukáš Dlouhý; Daniel Gimeno-Traver / Marc López	6^{4} 7^{7}	6; 0	[6] [10]

==== USA vs Spain ====
United States
2
Düsseldorf, Germany
18–19 May 2010
clay

Spain
1

			1	2	3
1	(United States) (Spain)	Robby Ginepri; Nicolás Almagro	3; 6	7; 5	6^{4} 7^{7}
2	(United States) (Spain)	Sam Querrey; Daniel Gimeno-Traver	6; 3	6; 4
3	(United States) (Spain)	Bob Bryan / Mike Bryan; Daniel Gimeno-Traver / Marc López	6; 3	7; 5

==== Czech Republic vs Australia ====
Czech Republic
2
Düsseldorf, Germany
18–19 May 2010
clay

Australia
1

			1	2	3
1	(Czech Republic) (Australia)	Jan Hájek; Peter Luczak	6; 1	6; 2
2	(Czech Republic) (Australia)	Tomáš Berdych; Carsten Ball	6; 3	7^{7} 6^{4}
3	(Czech Republic) (Australia)	Jan Hájek / Lukáš Dlouhý; Carsten Ball / Peter Luczak	3; 6	7; 5	[6] [10]

==== USA vs Czech Republic ====
United States
2
Düsseldorf, Germany
20–21 May 2010
clay

Czech Republic
1

			1	2	3
1	(United States) (Czech Republic)	Sam Querrey; Jan Hájek	6; 3	7; 5
2	(United States) (Czech Republic)	John Isner; Tomáš Berdych	6; 1	1; 6	6^{4} 7^{7}
3	(United States) (Czech Republic)	Bob Bryan / Mike Bryan; Tomáš Berdych / Lukáš Dlouhý	7; 5	7; 5

==== Australia vs Spain ====
Australia
1
Düsseldorf, Germany
20–21 May 2010
clay

Spain
2

			1	2	3
1	(Australia) (Spain)	Lleyton Hewitt; Nicolás Almagro	1; 6	3; 6
2	(Australia) (Spain)	Peter Luczak; Daniel Gimeno-Traver	3; 6	2; 6
3	(Australia) (Spain)	Lleyton Hewitt / Paul Hanley; Daniel Gimeno-Traver / Marc López	3; 6	6; 2	[10] [7]

== Final ==
=== Argentina vs USA ===
Argentina
2
Düsseldorf, Germany
22 May 2010
clay

United States
1

			1	2	3
1	(Argentina) (United States)	Juan Mónaco; Sam Querrey	1; 6	6; 2	6; 3
2	(Argentina) (United States)	Horacio Zeballos; Robby Ginepri	6; 4	6^{7} 7^{9}	7; 5
3	(Argentina) (United States)	Eduardo Schwank / Diego Veronelli; Bob Bryan / Mike Bryan	1; 6	2; 6

== See also ==
- Davis Cup
- Hopman Cup
