= Ergi (disambiguation) =

Ergi is an old Norse word.

Ergi may also refer to:

== Given name ==
- Ergi Borshi (born 1995), Albanian football
- Ergi Dini (1994–2016), Albanian singer, winner of the third season of X Factor Albania
- Ergi Kırkın (born 1999), Turkish tennis player
- Ergi Tırpancı (born 2000), Turkish basketball player

== Other uses ==
- ERGI, or ERG Iserlohn, a roller hockey team from Iserlohn, Germany.

== See also ==
- Ergis (disambiguation)
