= 2012 Power Horse World Team Cup =

Tennis tournament

2012 World Team Cup
- Date: 20–26 May
- Edition: 34th
- Category: World Team Cup
- Draw: 8 teams
- Surface: Clay / outdoor
- Location: Düsseldorf, Germany
- Venue: Rochusclub

Champions
- Serbia
- World Team Cup

The 2012 Power Horse World Team Cup was a tennis tournament played on outdoor clay courts. It was the 34th and final edition of the World Team Cup, and was part of the 2012 ATP World Tour. It took place at the Rochusclub in Düsseldorf, Germany from May 20–26, 2012.

== Points ==
World Team Cup
| Match type | 1st round | 2nd round | 3rd round | Finals | Points | Bonus | Total |
|---|---|---|---|---|---|---|---|
| Singles 1 | 35 | 35 | 35 | 95 | 200 | 50 | 250 |
| Singles 2 | 25 | 25 | 25 | 50 | 125 | 50 | 175 |
| Deciding match (doubles) | 35 | 35 | 35 | 95 | 200 | 50 | 250 |
| Dead rubber (doubles) | 10 | 10 | 10 | 20 | 50 | | 50 |

- Players who only play the finals will be awarded points from the previous round.
- Players must win all 4 matches and be part of the winning team in order to earn the Bonus Points.

== Players ==
The field was announced earlier, with Japan receiving a wild card later on.

=== Red Group ===
Czech Republic

- Tomáš Berdych (#7)
- Radek Štěpánek (#25)
- František Čermák (#21 Doubles)

United States

- Andy Roddick (#27)
- Ryan Harrison (#57)
- James Blake (#98)

Argentina

- Juan Ignacio Chela (#37)
- Carlos Berlocq (#38)
- Leonardo Mayer (#68)
- Juan Pablo Brzezicki (#433)

Japan

- Go Soeda (#61)
- Tatsuma Ito (#70)
- Bumpei Sato (#785)

=== Blue Group ===
Serbia

- Janko Tipsarević (#8)
- Viktor Troicki (#29)
- Nenad Zimonjić (#6 Doubles)
- Miki Janković (#887)

Germany

- Philipp Kohlschreiber (#24)
- Florian Mayer (#28)
- Philipp Petzschner (#93)
- Christopher Kas (#22 Doubles)

Russia

- Alex Bogomolov Jr. (#44)
- Dmitry Tursunov (#86)
- Igor Kunitsyn (#87)

Croatia

- Ivo Karlović (#60)
- Ivan Dodig (#74)
- Lovro Zovko (#89 Doubles)

== Round robin ==
=== Red Group ===
==== Standings ====
| Pos. | Country | Points | Matches | Sets |
|---|---|---|---|---|
| 1 | Czech Republic | 3–0 | 7–2 | 17–8 |
| 2 | Argentina | 2–1 | 7–2 | 16–8 |
| 3 | United States | 1–2 | 2–7 | 6–15 |
| 4 | Japan | 0–3 | 2–7 | 7–15 |

==== Argentina vs United States ====
Argentina
3
Düsseldorf, Germany
20 May 2012
clay

United States
0

| | | | 1 | 2 | 3 |
|---|---|---|---|---|---|
| 1 | (Argentina) (United States) | Carlos Berlocq; Andy Roddick | 6; 2 | 6; 2 |
| 2 | (Argentina) (United States) | Leonardo Mayer; Ryan Harrison | 6; 4 | 5; 7 | 6; 3 |
| 3 | (Argentina) (United States) | Carlos Berlocq / Juan Ignacio Chela; James Blake / Ryan Harrison | 7^{7} 6^{2} | 6; 4 |

==== Czech Republic vs Japan ====
Czech Republic
2
Düsseldorf, Germany
20–21 May 2012
clay

Japan
1

| | | | 1 | 2 | 3 |
|---|---|---|---|---|---|
| 1 | (Czech Republic) (Japan) | Tomáš Berdych; Go Soeda | 6; 1 | 3; 6 | 6; 1 |
| 2 | (Czech Republic) (Japan) | Radek Štěpánek; Tatsuma Ito | 6; 3 | 4; 6 | 4; 6 |
| 3 | (Czech Republic) (Japan) | František Čermák / Radek Štěpánek; Tatsuma Ito / Go Soeda | 6; 2 | 7^{7} 6^{4} |

==== Argentina vs Japan ====
Argentina
3
Düsseldorf, Germany
22–23 May 2012
clay

Japan
0

| | | | 1 | 2 | 3 |
|---|---|---|---|---|---|
| 1 | (Argentina) (Japan) | Carlos Berlocq; Go Soeda | 6; 3 | 6; 4 |
| 2 | (Argentina) (Japan) | Leonardo Mayer; Tatsuma Ito | 6; 4 | 6; 4 |
| 3 | (Argentina) (Japan) | Juan Ignacio Chela / Juan Pablo Brzezicki; Tatsuma Ito / Bumpei Sato | 6^{3} 7^{7} | 6; 1 | 10; 7 |

==== Czech Republic vs United States ====
Czech Republic
3
Düsseldorf, Germany
22–23 May 2012
clay

United States
0

| | | | 1 | 2 | 3 |
|---|---|---|---|---|---|
| 1 | (Czech Republic) (United States) | Tomáš Berdych; Andy Roddick | 6; 1 | 6; 2 |
| 2 | (Czech Republic) (United States) | Radek Štěpánek; James Blake | 6; 2 | 6; 1 |
| 3 | (Czech Republic) (United States) | František Čermák / Radek Štěpánek; Andy Roddick / Ryan Harrison | 7^{7} 6^{5} | 5; 7 | 10; 8 |

==== Czech Republic vs Argentina ====
Czech Republic
2
Düsseldorf, Germany
24–25 May 2012
clay

Argentina
1

| | | | 1 | 2 | 3 |
|---|---|---|---|---|---|
| 1 | (Czech Republic) (Argentina) | Tomáš Berdych; Carlos Berlocq | 6; 1 | 6^{2} 7^{7} | 6; 3 |
| 2 | (Czech Republic) (Argentina) | Radek Štěpánek; Leonardo Mayer | 7^{7} 6^{4} | 5; 7 | 4; 6 |
| 3 | (Czech Republic) (Argentina) | František Čermák / Radek Štěpánek; Carlos Berlocq / Leonardo Mayer | 6; 4 | 4; 6 | 10; 3 |

==== United States vs Japan ====
United States
2
Düsseldorf, Germany
24 May 2012
clay

Japan
1

| | | | 1 | 2 | 3 |
|---|---|---|---|---|---|
| 1 | (United States) (Japan) | Andy Roddick; Go Soeda | 5; 7 | 6^{5} 7^{7} |
| 2 | (United States) (Japan) | Ryan Harrison; Tatsuma Ito | 6; 2 | 7^{7} 6^{5} |
| 3 | (United States) (Japan) | James Blake / Ryan Harrison; Tatsuma Ito / Bumpei Sato | 4; 6 | 6; 0 | 10; 3 |

=== Blue Group ===
==== Standings ====
| Pos. | Country | Points | Matches | Sets |
|---|---|---|---|---|
| 1 | Serbia | 3–0 | 6–3 | 12–7 |
| 2 | Germany | 2–1 | 7–2 | 15–6 |
| 3 | Russia | 1–2 | 3–6 | 7–13 |
| 4 | Croatia | 0–3 | 2–7 | 6–14 |

==== Croatia vs Serbia ====
Croatia
1
Düsseldorf, Germany
20–21 May 2012
clay

Serbia
2

| | | | 1 | 2 | 3 |
|---|---|---|---|---|---|
| 1 | (Croatia) (Serbia) | Lovro Zovko; Janko Tipsarević | 0; 6 | 0; 6 |
| 2 | (Croatia) (Serbia) | Ivan Dodig; Viktor Troicki | 3; 6 | 6^{3} 7^{7} |
| 3 | (Croatia) (Serbia) | Ivan Dodig / Lovro Zovko; Viktor Troicki / Nenad Zimonjić | 7^{7} 6^{5} | 7^{7} 6^{4} |

==== Germany vs Russia ====
Germany
3
Düsseldorf, Germany
20–21 May 2012
clay

Russia
0

| | | | 1 | 2 | 3 |
|---|---|---|---|---|---|
| 1 | (Germany) (Russia) | Philipp Kohlschreiber; Alex Bogomolov Jr. | 6; 0 | 6; 2 |
| 2 | (Germany) (Russia) | Florian Mayer; Igor Andreev | 6; 2 | 7^{9} 6^{7} |
| 3 | (Germany) (Russia) | Christopher Kas / Florian Mayer; Igor Kunitsyn / Dmitry Tursunov | 6; 4 | 3; 6 | 10; 8 |

==== Croatia vs Germany ====
Croatia
0
Düsseldorf, Germany
22–23 May 2012
clay

Germany
3

| | | | 1 | 2 | 3 |
|---|---|---|---|---|---|
| 1 | (Croatia) (Germany) | Lovro Zovko; Philipp Kohlschreiber | 2; 6 | 6^{2} 7^{7} |
| 2 | (Croatia) (Germany) | Ivan Dodig; Florian Mayer | 1; 6 | 1; 6 |
| 3 | (Croatia) (Germany) | Ivan Dodig / Lovro Zovko; Christopher Kas / Philipp Petzschner | 4; 6 | 6; 1 | 3; 10 |

==== Serbia vs Russia ====
Serbia
2
Düsseldorf, Germany
22–23 May 2012
clay

Russia
1

| | | | 1 | 2 | 3 |
|---|---|---|---|---|---|
| 1 | (Serbia) (Russia) | Janko Tipsarević; Alex Bogomolov Jr. | 6; 1 | 6; 3 |
| 2 | (Serbia) (Russia) | Viktor Troicki; Dmitry Tursunov | 6; 3 | 6; 2 |
| 3 | (Serbia) (Russia) | Miki Janković / Nenad Zimonjić; Dmitry Tursunov / Igor Kunitsyn | 5; 7 | 6^{6} 7^{8} |

==== Serbia vs Germany ====
Serbia
2
Düsseldorf, Germany
24–25 May 2012
clay

Germany
1

| | | | 1 | 2 | 3 |
|---|---|---|---|---|---|
| 1 | (Serbia) (Germany) | Janko Tipsarević; Philipp Kohlschreiber | 6; 4 | 3; 6 | 7; 5 |
| 2 | (Serbia) (Germany) | Viktor Troicki; Florian Mayer | 7^{8} 6^{6} | 6; 3 |
| 3 | (Serbia) (Germany) | Miki Janković / Nenad Zimonjić; Christopher Kas / Philipp Petzschner | 4; 6 | 4; 6 |

==== Russia vs Croatia ====
Russia
2
Düsseldorf, Germany
24–25 May 2012
clay

Croatia
1

| | | | 1 | 2 | 3 |
|---|---|---|---|---|---|
| 1 | (Russia) (Croatia) | Alex Bogomolov Jr. Lovro Zovko | 6; 4 | 6; 2 |
| 2 | (Russia) (Croatia) | Igor Kunitsyn; Ivan Dodig | 6^{0} 7^{7} | 4; 6 |
| 3 | (Russia) (Croatia) | Igor Kunitsyn / Dmitri Tursunov; Ivan Dodig / Lovro Zovko | 2; 6 | 6; 3 | 10; 3 |

== Final ==
Czech Republic
0
Düsseldorf, Germany
26 May 2012
clay

Serbia
3

| | | | 1 | 2 | 3 |
|---|---|---|---|---|---|
| 1 | (Czech Republic) (Serbia) | Tomáš Berdych; Janko Tipsarević | 5; 7 | 6^{8} 7^{10} |
| 2 | (Czech Republic) (Serbia) | Radek Štěpánek; Viktor Troicki | 6; 2 | 4; 6 | 3; 6 |
| 3 | (Czech Republic) (Serbia) | Tomáš Berdych / František Čermák; Janko Tipsarević / Nenad Zimonjić | 3; 6 | 1; 6 |
