= 2008 ARAG World Team Cup =

2008 World Team Cup
- Date: 18–24 May
- Edition: 30th
- Category: World Team Cup
- Surface: Clay / outdoor
- Location: Düsseldorf, Germany
- Venue: Rochusclub

Champions
- Sweden
- World Team Cup

The 2008 ARAG World Team Cup was a tennis tournament play on outdoor clay courts. It was the 30th edition of the World Team Cup, and was part of the 250 series of the 2008 ATP Tour. It took place at the Rochusclub in Düsseldorf, Germany, from 18 May through 24 May 2008.

Argentina were the defending champions but they failed to advance beyond the group stage. Sweden defeated Russia in the final, by two rubbers to one for their fourth title. It was also their first title since 1995.

== Blue group ==
=== Standings ===
Pos.	Country	Points	Matches	Sets
1.	Russia	2 – 1	6 – 3	12 – 9
2.	Italy	2 – 1	5 – 4	13 – 9
3.	Germany	1 – 2	3 – 6	8 – 13
4.	Spain	1 – 2	4 – 5	9 – 11

=== Germany vs. Spain ===
Germany
2
Düsseldorf, Germany
May 18, 2008 + 19 May 2008
clay

Spain
1

			1	2	3
1	(Germany) (Spain)	Philipp Kohlschreiber; David Ferrer	6; 1	6; 0
2	(Germany) (Spain)	Denis Gremelmayr; Feliciano López	4; 6	3; 6
3	(Germany) (Spain)	Christopher Kas / Philipp Petzschner; Marcel Granollers / Feliciano López	6^{5} 7^{7}	6; 4	10; 5

=== Russia vs. Italy ===
Russia
2
Düsseldorf, Germany
18 May + 19 May 2008
clay

Italy
1

			1	2	3
1	(Russia) (Italy)	Mikhail Youzhny; Potito Starace	6; 4	5; 7	6; 2
2	(Russia) (Italy)	Igor Andreev; Simone Bolelli	6; 3	6^{2} 7^{7}	6; 3
3	(Russia) (Italy)	Igor Andreev / Dmitry Tursunov; Simone Bolelli / Potito Starace	4; 6	4; 6

=== Germany vs. Italy ===
Germany
1
Düsseldorf, Germany
20 May + 21 May 2008
clay

Italy
2

			1	2	3
1	(Germany) (Italy)	Philipp Kohlschreiber; Potito Starace	6; 2	7^{7} 6^{5}
2	(Germany) (Italy)	Nicolas Kiefer; Simone Bolelli	6^{5} 7^{7}	6; 7
3	(Germany) (Italy)	Christopher Kas / Philipp Petzschner; Potito Starace / Simone Bolelli	6; 2	3; 6	4; 10

=== Spain vs. Russia ===
Spain
2
Düsseldorf, Germany
20 May + 21 May 2008
clay

Russia
1

			1	2	3
1	(Spain) (Russia)	David Ferrer; Mikhail Youzhny	6; 3	6; 3
2	(Spain) (Russia)	Feliciano López; Igor Andreev	6; 4	6; 4
3	(Spain) (Russia)	Marcel Granollers / Feliciano López; Dmitry Tursunov / Mikhail Youzhny	3; 6	4; 6

=== Russia vs. Germany ===
Russia
3
Düsseldorf, Germany
22 May + 23 May 2008
clay

Germany
0

			1	2	3
1	(Russia) (Germany)	Igor Andreev; Philipp Kohlschreiber	6; 4	6; 3
2	(Russia) (Germany)	Dmitry Tursunov; Nicolas Kiefer	6; 4	3; 6	7; 5
3	(Russia) (Germany)	Dmitry Tursunov / Mikhail Youzhny; Christopher Kas / Philipp Petzschner	7^{7} 6^{2}	6; 3

=== Spain vs. Italy ===
Spain
1
Düsseldorf, Germany
22 May + 23 May 2008
clay

Italy
2

			1	2	3
1	(Spain) (Italy)	David Ferrer; Potito Starace	6; 3	3; 6	6; 3
2	(Spain) (Italy)	Feliciano López; Simone Bolelli	4; 6	3; 6
3	(Spain) (Italy)	Marcel Granollers / Feliciano López; Simone Bolelli / Potito Starace	4; 6	6^{4} 7^{7}

== Red group ==
=== Standings ===
Pos.	Country	Points	Matches	Sets
1.	Sweden	3 – 0	8 – 1	16 – 6
2.	United States	2 – 1	4 – 5	10 – 12
3.	Argentina	1 – 2	4 – 5	10 – 10
4.	Czech Republic	0 – 3	2 – 7	7 – 15

=== United States vs. Czech Republic ===
United States
2
Düsseldorf, Germany
18 May + 19 May 2008
clay

Czech Republic
1

			1	2	3
1	(United States) (Czech Republic)	James Blake; Tomáš Berdych	6^{5} 7^{7}	6^{5} 7^{7}
2	(United States) (Czech Republic)	Wayne Odesnik; Ivo Minář	6; 2	6; 1
3	(United States) (Czech Republic)	James Blake / Wayne Odesnik; Tomáš Berdych / Pavel Vízner	0; 6	7; 5	10; 8

=== Argentina vs. Sweden ===
Argentina
1
Düsseldorf, Germany
18 May + 19 May 2008
clay

Sweden
2

			1	2	3
1	(Argentina) (Sweden)	Guillermo Cañas; Robin Söderling	3; 6	1; 6
2	(Argentina) (Sweden)	Juan Ignacio Chela; Thomas Johansson	6; 2	6; 1
3	(Argentina) (Sweden)	Lucas Arnold Ker / Sebastián Prieto; Robin Söderling / Robert Lindstedt	5; 7	2; 6

=== United States vs. Argentina ===
United States
2
Düsseldorf, Germany
20 May + 21 May 2008
clay

Argentina
1

			1	2	3
1	(United States) (Argentina)	James Blake; Guillermo Cañas	7^{7} 6^{5}	6; 4
2	(United States) (Argentina)	Wayne Odesnik; Juan Ignacio Chela	5; 7	1; 6
3	(United States) (Argentina)	Wayne Odesnik / Bobby Reynolds; Lucas Arnold Ker / Sebastián Prieto	6; 3	6^{5} 7^{7}	10; 7

=== Czech Republic vs. Sweden ===
Czech Republic
0
Düsseldorf, Germany
20 May + 21 May 2008
clay

Sweden
3

			1	2	3
1	(Czech Republic) (Sweden)	Tomáš Berdych; Robin Söderling	4; 6	6; 1	3; 6
2	(Czech Republic) (Sweden)	Michal Tabara; Thomas Johansson	2; 6	6; 4	6^{5} 7^{7}
3	(Czech Republic) (Sweden)	Michal Tabara / Pavel Vízner; Robert Lindstedt / Robin Söderling	4; 6	5; 7

=== United States vs. Sweden ===
United States
0
Düsseldorf, Germany
22 May + 23 May 2008
clay

Sweden
3

			1	2	3
1	(United States) (Sweden)	James Blake; Robin Söderling	7; 5	3; 6	0; 6
2	(United States) (Sweden)	Bobby Reynolds; Thomas Johansson	3; 6	6; 2	3; 6
3	(United States) (Sweden)	Wayne Odesnik / Bobby Reynolds; Robert Lindstedt / Robin Söderling	1; 6	2; 6

=== Argentina vs. Czech Republic ===
Argentina
2
Düsseldorf, Germany
22 May + 23 May 2008
clay

Czech Republic
1

			1	2	3
1	(Argentina) (Czech Republic)	Guillermo Cañas; Tomáš Berdych	2; 6	6; 3	3; 6
2	(Argentina) (Czech Republic)	Juan Ignacio Chela; Michal Tabara	6; 0	6; 4
3	(Argentina) (Czech Republic)	Lucas Arnold Ker / Sebastián Prieto; Tomáš Berdych / Pavel Vízner	7^{7} 6^{4}	6; 3

== Final ==
=== Russia vs. Sweden ===
Russia
1
Düsseldorf, Germany
24 May 2008
clay

Sweden
2

			1	2	3
1	(Russia) (Sweden)	Mikhail Youzhny; Robin Söderling	3; 6	1; 6
2	(Russia) (Sweden)	Igor Andreev; Thomas Johansson	2; 6	6; 3	6; 4
3	(Russia) (Sweden)	Dmitry Tursunov / Mikhail Youzhny; Robert Lindstedt / Robin Söderling	6; 4	6^{5} 7^{7}	9; 11
