= 2002 ARAG World Team Cup =

Tennis tournament

The 2002 ARAG World Team Cup was a men's team tennis tournament played on outdoor clay courts. It was the 24th edition of the World Team Cup and was part of the International Series of the 2002 ATP Tour. It took place at the Rochusclub in Düsseldorf in Germany from May 19 through May 25, 2002.

Australia were the defending champions but did not compete that year.

Argentina defeated Russia in the final to win the title for the second time.

== Players ==
=== Red Group ===
Argentina

- José Acasuso (# 95)
- Lucas Arnold (# 34 Doubles)
- Guillermo Cañas (# 16)
- Gastón Etlis (# 36 Doubles)

France

- Arnaud Clément (# 26 Doubles)
- Nicolas Escudé (# 27)

Sweden

- Jonas Björkman (# 15 Doubles)
- Thomas Enqvist (# 22)
- Thomas Johansson (# 8)

United States

- James Blake (# 38)
- Jared Palmer (# 1 Doubles)
- Andy Roddick (# 13)
- Pete Sampras (# 11)

=== Blue Group ===
Germany

- Karsten Braasch (# 44 Doubles)
- Lars Burgsmüller (# 78)
- Tommy Haas (# 2)
- Nicolas Kiefer (# 58)
- Philipp Kohlschreiber (# 426)

United Kingdom

- Tim Henman (# 6)
- Martin Lee (# 96)
- Miles Maclagan (# 1093 Doubles)

Russia

- Andrei Cherkasov (# 537)
- Yevgeny Kafelnikov (# 4)
- Marat Safin (# 5)

Spain

- Galo Blanco (# 91)
- Àlex Corretja (# 21)
- Albert Costa (# 19)

== Round robin ==
=== Red Group ===
==== Standings ====
Pos.	Country	Points	Matches	Sets
1	Argentina	2–1	5–4	11–11
2	Sweden	2–1	6–3	15–10
3	France	1–2	5–4	11–7
4	United States	1–2	2–7	9–14

==== United States vs. France ====
United States
0
Düsseldorf, Germany
19 May 2002
Clay

France
3

			1	2	3
1	(United States) (France)	Andy Roddick; Arnaud Clément	6; 3	4; 6	3; 6
2	(United States) (France)	Pete Sampras; Nicolas Escudé	6^{3} 7^{7}	6; 2	6^{2} 7^{7}
3	(United States) (France)	James Blake / Jared Palmer; Arnaud Clément / Nicolas Escudé	1; 6	1; 6

==== Sweden vs. Argentina ====
Sweden
1
Düsseldorf, Germany
20 May 2002
Clay

Argentina
2

			1	2	3
1	(Sweden) (Argentina)	Thomas Enqvist; José Acasuso	4; 6	6; 1	7^{7} 6^{5}
2	(Sweden) (Argentina)	Thomas Johansson; Guillermo Cañas	2; 6	6; 4	0; 6
3	(Sweden) (Argentina)	Jonas Björkman / Thomas Johansson; Lucas Arnold / Gastón Etlis	3; 6	7^{7} 6^{3}	9; 11

==== United States vs. Argentina ====
United States
2
Düsseldorf, Germany
21 May 2002
Clay

Argentina
1

			1	2	3
1	(United States) (Argentina)	Andy Roddick; José Acasuso	6; 3	6; 2
2	(United States) (Argentina)	Pete Sampras; Guillermo Cañas	7; 5	2; 6	6^{5} 7^{7}
3	(United States) (Argentina)	James Blake / Jared Palmer; Lucas Arnold / Gastón Etlis	7; 5	6; 2

==== Sweden vs. France ====
Sweden
2
Düsseldorf, Germany
21 May 2002
Clay

France
1

			1	2	3
1	(Sweden) (France)	Thomas Enqvist; Nicolas Escudé	6; 4	6; 4
2	(Sweden) (France)	Jonas Björkman; Arnaud Clément	1; 6	6; 4	4; 6
3	(Sweden) (France)	Jonas Björkman / Thomas Enqvist; Arnaud Clément / Nicolas Escudé	6; 3	4; 6	10; 3

==== United States vs. Sweden ====
United States
0
Düsseldorf, Germany
23 May 2002
Clay

Sweden
3

			1	2	3
1	(United States) (Sweden)	James Blake; Thomas Enqvist	6; 4	5; 7	6^{4} 7^{7}
2	(United States) (Sweden)	Pete Sampras; Thomas Johansson	2; 6	7^{7} 6^{3}	6^{5} 7^{7}
3	(United States) (Sweden)	James Blake / Jared Palmer; Jonas Björkman / Thomas Johansson	3; 6	4; 6

==== France vs. Argentina ====
France
1
Düsseldorf, Germany
23 May 2002
Clay

Argentina
2

			1	2	3
1	(France) (Argentina)	Arnaud Clément; José Acasuso	6^{1} 7^{7}	3; 6
2	(France) (Argentina)	Nicolas Escudé; Guillermo Cañas	5; 7	2; 6
3	(France) (Argentina)	Arnaud Clément / Nicolas Escudé; Lucas Arnold / Gastón Etlis	6; 1	6; 4

=== Blue Group ===
==== Standings ====
Pos.	Country	Points	Matches	Sets
1	Russia	2–1	5–4	11–9
2	Spain	2–1	6–3	13–7
3	Great Britain	1–2	4–5	9–10
4	Germany	1–2	3–3	6–11

==== Spain vs. Great Britain ====
Spain
2
Düsseldorf, Germany
19 May 2002
Clay

Great Britain
1

			1	2	3
1	(Spain) (United Kingdom)	Àlex Corretja; Martin Lee	6; 3	6; 4
2	(Spain) (United Kingdom)	Albert Costa; Tim Henman	4; 6	6; 3	6; 2
3	(Spain) (United Kingdom)	Galo Blanco / Àlex Corretja; Martin Lee / Miles Maclagan	3; 6	5; 7

==== Russia vs. Germany ====
Russia
1
Düsseldorf, Germany
20 May 2002
Clay

Germany
2

			1	2	3
1	(Russia) (Germany)	Yevgeny Kafelnikov; Tommy Haas	6^{5} 7^{7}	3; 6
2	(Russia) (Germany)	Marat Safin; Nicolas Kiefer	4; 6	6; 2	6^{5} 7^{7}
3	(Russia) (Germany)	Yevgeny Kafelnikov / Marat Safin; Karsten Braasch / Lars Burgsmüller	6; 1	6; 1

==== Germany vs. Great Britain ====
Germany
1
Düsseldorf, Germany
22 May 2002
Clay

Great Britain
2

			1	2	3
1	(Germany) (United Kingdom)	Nicolas Kiefer; Tim Henman	6^{6} 7^{8}	3; 6
2	(Germany) (United Kingdom)	Lars Burgsmüller; Martin Lee	6; 3	6; 3
3	(Germany) (United Kingdom)	Lars Burgsmüller / Nicolas Kiefer; Martin Lee / Miles Maclagan	4; 6	1; 2		retired

==== Russia vs. Spain ====
Russia
2
Düsseldorf, Germany
22 May 2002
Clay

Spain
1

			1	2	3
1	(Russia) (Spain)	Marat Safin; Àlex Corretja	6; 4	6; 4
2	(Russia) (Spain)	Yevgeny Kafelnikov; Albert Costa	3; 6	6^{6} 7^{8}
3	(Russia) (Spain)	Yevgeny Kafelnikov / Marat Safin; Àlex Corretja / Albert Costa	6^{1} 7^{7}	6; 3	10; 5

==== Spain vs. Germany ====
Spain
3
Düsseldorf, Germany
24 May 2002
Clay

Germany
0

			1	2	3
1	(Spain) (Germany)	Albert Costa; Nicolas Kiefer	6; 2	6; 2
2	(Spain) (Germany)	Àlex Corretja; Philipp Kohlschreiber	6; 3	6; 4
3	(Spain) (Germany)	Àlex Corretja / Albert Costa; Karsten Braasch / Philipp Kohlschreiber	6; 3	6; 2

==== Russia vs. Great Britain ====
Russia
2
Düsseldorf, Germany
24 May 2002
Clay

Great Britain
1

			1	2	3
1	(Russia) (United Kingdom)	Yevgeny Kafelnikov; Tim Henman	2; 6	6^{6} 7^{8}
2	(Russia) (United Kingdom)	Marat Safin; Martin Lee	7; 5	7; 5
3	(Russia) (United Kingdom)	Yevgeny Kafelnikov / Marat Safin; Martin Lee / Miles Maclagan	6; 1	6; 0

== Final ==
=== Russia vs. Argentina ===
Russia
0
Düsseldorf, Germany
25 May 2002
Clay

Argentina
3

			1	2	3
1	(Russia) (Argentina)	Marat Safin; José Acasuso	6; 2	2; 6	0; 3	retired
2	(Russia) (Argentina)	Yevgeny Kafelnikov; Guillermo Cañas	4; 6	2; 6
3	(Russia) (Argentina)	Andrei Cherkasov / Yevgeny Kafelnikov; Lucas Arnold / Gastón Etlis	4; 6	1; 6

== See also ==
- Davis Cup
- Hopman Cup
