= World Team Cup =

Tournament information
- Founded: 1975
- Abolished: 2012
- Editions: 34
- Location: Düsseldorf; Germany
- Venue: Rochusclub
- Category: ATP World Tour 250 series
- Surface: Clay / outdoors
- Draw: 8 teams (round-robin)
- Prize money: US$1,764,700
- Website: World-Team-Cup.com

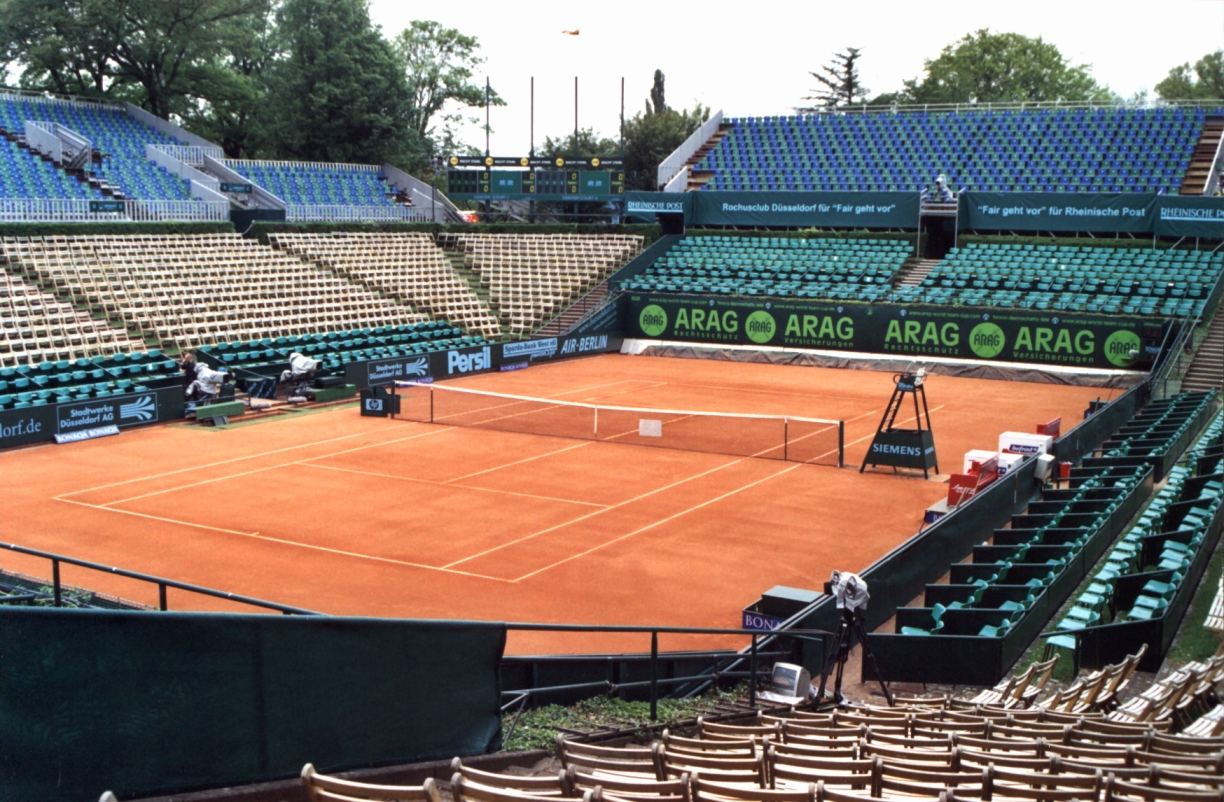
Rochusclub clay court in Düsseldorf, Germany

The World Team Cup was the international men's team championship of the Association of Tennis Professionals (ATP). The inaugural edition of the tournament was contested in 1975 in Kingston, Jamaica and was called the Nations Cup. No tournament was held in 1976 and 1977. From 1978 through 2012 the tournament was held annually in Düsseldorf, Germany. It was generally considered to be second most prestigious men's team competition in tennis after the Davis Cup.

Every year, the eight nations whose top two male players have achieved the highest combined placings in the men's world rankings at the end of the previous year were invited to compete for the cup.

The competition was played on clay courts in Düsseldorf, Germany. The event was generally regarded as the sports highlight of the social scene in the Düsseldorf area. It attracted around 75,000 visitors every year and was televised to over 160 countries.

From 1978 to 1981 the tournament was held under the name "Ambre Solaire Nations Cup", from 1982 until 1986 it was named "Ambre Solaire World Team Cup", from 1987–1999 "Peugeot World Team Cup" and from 2000 the event's main sponsor until 2010 was the ARAG Insurance Group, and its sponsored name was the "ARAG World Team Cup".

After ARAG discontinued sponsorship for the event and organizers failed to find a new sponsor, the 2011 edition of the tournament was initially cancelled. However, a new sponsor — Power Horse — was found in January 2011 and the 2011 edition took place between May 15–21 under the name "Power Horse World Team Cup".

In October 2012 it was announced that the World Team Cup event would be discontinued and replaced by the Power Horse Cup, an ATP 250 tournament in Düsseldorf.

In September 2017 it was announced that there were plans to revive the tournament: the ATP had proposed a 24 team tournament to be played over 10 days at venues around Australia in January, which would offer 1000 ranking points to any player who won all their matches.

In January 2018 it was mooted to start in 2019 or 2020 with the backing from Tennis Australia, In the end, the ATP decided to launch the competition as the ATP Cup, a separate tournament to the World Team Cup, in 2020.

On 7 August 2022, Tennis Australia announced that the ATP Cup would be shut down, to be replaced by a mixed-gender United Cup from 2023.

== Past finals ==
Year	Champions	Runners-up	Score
1975	United States	(United Kingdom) Great Britain	2–1
1976	Not held		
1977	Not held		
1978	Spain	Australia	2–1
1979	Australia	Italy	2–1
1980	Argentina	Italy	3–0
1981	Czechoslovakia	Australia	2–1
1982	United States	Australia	2–0
1983	Spain	Australia	2–1
1984	United States	Czechoslovakia	2–1
1985	United States	Czechoslovakia	2–1
1986	France	Sweden	2–1
1987	Czechoslovakia	United States	2–1
1988	Sweden	United States	2–0
1989	West Germany	Argentina	2–1
1990	(Socialist Federal Republic of Yugoslavia) Yugoslavia	United States	3–0
1991	Sweden	(Socialist Federal Republic of Yugoslavia) Yugoslavia	2–1
1992	Spain	Czech Republic	2–0
1993	United States	Germany	3–0
1994	Germany	Spain	2–1
1995	Sweden	Croatia	2–1
1996	Switzerland	Czech Republic	2–1
1997	Spain	Australia	3–0
1998	Germany	Czech Republic	3–0
1999	Australia	Sweden	2–1
2000	Slovakia	Russia	3–0
2001	Australia	Russia	2–1
2002	Argentina	Russia	3–0
2003	Chile	Czech Republic	2–1
2004	Chile	Australia	2–1
2005	Germany	Argentina	2–1
2006	Croatia	Germany	2–1
2007	Argentina	Czech Republic	2–1
2008	Sweden	Russia	2–1
2009	Serbia	Germany	2–1
2010	Argentina	United States	2–1
2011	Germany	Argentina	2–1
2012	Serbia	Czech Republic	3–0
2020	Serbia	Spain	2–1
2021	Russia	Italy	2–0
2022	(Canada) Canadá	Spain	2–0

== Titles by country ==
Titles won	Country	Years Won	Runners Up
5	United States	1975, 1982, 1984, 1985, 1993 (5)	1987, 1988, 1990, 2010 (4)
5	Germany	1989, 1994, 1998, 2005, 2011 (5)	1993, 2006, 2009 (3)
4	Argentina	1980, 2002, 2007, 2010 (4)	1989, 2005, 2011 (3)
4	Sweden	1988, 1991, 1995, 2008 (4)	1986, 1999 (2)
4	Spain	1978, 1983, 1992, 1997 (4)	1994 (1)
3	Australia	1979, 1999, 2001 (3)	1978, 1981, 1982, 1983, 1997, 2004 (6)
3	Serbia	2009, 2012, 2020 (3)	
2	Czechoslovakia	1981, 1987 (2)	1984, 1985 (2)
2	Chile	2003, 2004 (2)	
1	(Socialist Federal Republic of Yugoslavia) Yugoslavia	1990 (1)	1991 (1)
1	Croatia	2006 (1)	1995 (1)
1	France	1986 (1)	
1	Switzerland	1996 (1)	
1	Slovakia	2000 (1)	
0	Czech Republic		1992, 1996, 1998, 2003, 2007, 2012 (6)
0	Russia		2000, 2001, 2002, 2008 (4)
0	Italy		1979, 1980 (2)
0	(United Kingdom) Great Britain		1975 (1)

== Point distribution ==
World Team Cup
Match type	1st round	2nd round	3rd round	Finals	Points	Bonus	Total
Singles 1	35	35	35	95	200	50	250
Singles 2	25	25	25	50	125	50	175
Deciding match (doubles)	35	35	35	95	200	50	250
Dead rubber (doubles)	10	10	10	20	50		50

- Players who only play the finals will be awarded points from the previous round.
- Players must win all 4 matches and be part of the winning team in order to earn the Bonus Points.

== Fair Play Trophy ==
Presented since 1989, the Fair Play Trophy was awarded by an international jury of tennis journalists and the captains of the competing nations.

Year	Player
1989	(Sweden) Stefan Edberg
1990	(Argentina) Martín Jaite
1991	(Germany) Eric Jelen
1992	(France) Guy Forget
1993	(United States) Pete Sampras
1994	(Sweden) Magnus Gustafsson
1995	(Sweden) Stefan Edberg (2)
1996	(Switzerland) Jakob Hlasek
1997	(Germany) Michael Stich
1998	(Czech Republic) Petr Korda
1999	(Spain) Àlex Corretja
2000	(Australia) Patrick Rafter
2001	(Australia) Patrick Rafter (2)
2002	(United States) Pete Sampras (2)
2003	(United States) Todd Martin
2004	(Netherlands) Sjeng Schalken
2005	(Sweden) Jonas Björkman
2006	(United States) James Blake
2007	(Sweden) Jonas Björkman (2)
2008	(United States) James Blake (2)
2009	(Germany) Rainer Schüttler
2010	(Australia) Lleyton Hewitt
2011	(Germany) Philipp Kohlschreiber
2011	(Sweden) Robin Söderling
2012	(Czech Republic) Tomáš Berdych

== See also ==
- Davis Cup
- ATP Cup
- Fed Cup
- Hopman Cup
