= 2005 World Team Cup =

- Date: 15–21 May
- Edition: 27th
- Category: World Team Cup
- Surface: Clay / outdoor
- Location: Düsseldorf, Germany
- Venue: Rochusclub

Champions
- Germany
- World Team Cup

The 2005 ARAG World Team Cup was a tennis tournament play on outdoor clay courts. It was the 27th edition of the World Team Cup, and was part of the 2005 ATP Tour. It took place at the Rochusclub in Düsseldorf, Germany, from 15 May through 21 May 2005.

Chile were the two time defending champions, but they failed to advance beyond the group stage. Germany won the title, defeating Argentina in the final, by two rubbers to one.

== Squads ==
=== Blue group ===
Germany

- Tommy Haas (# 22)
- Nicolas Kiefer (# 29)
- Florian Mayer (# 54)
- Alexander Waske (# 51 Doubles)

Spain

- David Ferrer (# 20)
- Álex López Morón (# 94 Doubles)
- Tommy Robredo (# 16)
- Santiago Ventura (# 71)

Sweden

- Jonas Björkman (# 1 Doubles)
- Joachim Johansson (# 12)
- Thomas Johansson (# 20)

United States

- Bob Bryan (# 5 Doubles)
- Mike Bryan (# 5 Doubles)
- Jeff Morrison (# 111)
- Vincent Spadea (# 43)

=== Red group ===
Argentina

- Guillermo Cañas (# 10)
- Juan Ignacio Chela (# 33)
- Guillermo Coria (# 9)
- Gastón Gaudio (# 6)

Chile

- Adrián García (# 183)
- Hermes Gamonal (# 258 Doubles)
- Fernando González (# 26)
- Nicolás Massú (# 23)

Czech Republic

- Tomáš Berdych (# 46)
- Jiří Novák (# 27)

France

- Arnaud Clément (# 61 Doubles)
- Sébastien Grosjean (# 24)
- Michaël Llodra (# 9 Doubles)

- Rankings are as of May 16, 2005.

== Round robin ==
=== Blue group ===
==== Standings ====
Pos.	Country	Points	Matches	Sets
1.	Germany	3	6–3	13–8
2.	Spain	2	5–4	11–10
3.	Sweden	1	4–5	10–10
4.	United States	0	3–6	7–13

==== Germany vs. United States ====
Germany
2
Düsseldorf, Germany
15 May 2005
clay

United States
1

			1	2	3
1	(Germany) (United States)	Tommy Haas; Vincent Spadea	6; 4	6; 2
2	(Germany) (United States)	Nicolas Kiefer; Jeff Morrison	6; 2	6; 2
3	(Germany) (United States)	Tommy Haas / Alexander Waske; Bob Bryan / Mike Bryan	7^{7} 6^{4}	6^{5} 7^{7}	5; 7

==== Spain vs. Sweden ====
Spain
2
Düsseldorf, Germany
16 May 2005
clay

Sweden
1

			1	2	3
1	(Spain) (Sweden)	Tommy Robredo; Thomas Johansson	6^{4} 7^{7}	1; 6
2	(Spain) (Sweden)	David Ferrer; Jonas Björkman	6; 4	6; 1
3	(Spain) (Sweden)	Tommy Robredo / Santiago Ventura; Jonas Björkman / Thomas Johansson	6^{6} 7^{8}	6; 3	6; 3

==== Germany vs. Sweden ====
Germany
2
Düsseldorf, Germany
18 May 2005
clay

Sweden
1

			1	2	3
1	(Germany) (Sweden)	Tommy Haas; Joachim Johansson	6; 0	3; 6	6; 3
2	(Germany) (Sweden)	Nicolas Kiefer; Thomas Johansson	4; 6	2; 6
3	(Germany) (Sweden)	Tommy Haas / Alexander Waske; Jonas Björkman / Thomas Johansson	6; 4	6; 4

==== Spain vs. United States ====
Spain
2
Düsseldorf, Germany
18 May 2005
clay

United States
1

			1	2	3
1	(Spain) (United States)	Tommy Robredo; Vincent Spadea	6; 3	2; 6	6; 3
2	(Spain) (United States)	David Ferrer; Jeff Morrison	6; 4	7^{9} 6^{7}
3	(Spain) (United States)	Álex López Morón / Santiago Ventura; Bob Bryan / Mike Bryan	2; 6	3; 6

==== Germany vs. Spain ====
Germany
2
Düsseldorf, Germany
20 May 2005
clay

Spain
1

			1	2	3
1	(Germany) (Spain)	Tommy Haas; Tommy Robredo	6^{4} 7^{7}	4; 6
2	(Germany) (Spain)	Florian Mayer; David Ferrer	3; 6	7^{7} 6^{4}	6; 3
3	(Germany) (Spain)	Tommy Haas / Alexander Waske; Tommy Robredo / Santiago Ventura	7^{7} 6^{3}	6; 3

==== Sweden vs. United States ====
Sweden
2
Düsseldorf, Germany
20 May 2005
clay

United States
1

			1	2	3
1	(Sweden) (United States)	Joachim Johansson; Vincent Spadea	3; 6	4; 6
2	(Sweden) (United States)	Thomas Johansson; Jeff Morrison	6; 1	6; 4
3	(Sweden) (United States)	Jonas Björkman / Thomas Johansson; Bob Bryan / Mike Bryan	6; 4	6; 2

=== Red group ===
==== Standings ====
Pos.	Country	Points	Matches	Sets
1.	Argentina	3	7–2	15–5
2.	Chile	2	4–5	9–10
3.	France	1	4–5	8–10
4.	Czech Republic	0	3–6	6–13

==== Chile vs. Czech Republic ====
Chile
2
Düsseldorf, Germany
15 May 2005
clay

Czech Republic
1

			1	2	3
1	(Chile) (Czech Republic)	Fernando González; Jiří Novák	6; 3	6; 1
2	(Chile) (Czech Republic)	Nicolás Massú; Tomáš Berdych	7^{7} 6^{5}	6; 3
3	(Chile) (Czech Republic)	Adrián García / Hermes Gamonal; Tomáš Berdych / Jiří Novák	4; 6	4; 6

==== Argentina vs. France ====
Argentina
2
Düsseldorf, Germany
16 May 2005
clay

France
1

			1	2	3
1	(Argentina) (France)	Gastón Gaudio; Arnaud Clément	6; 4	6; 4
2	(Argentina) (France)	Guillermo Coria; Michaël Llodra	6; 1	6; 4
3	(Argentina) (France)	Guillermo Cañas / Juan Ignacio Chela; Arnaud Clément / Michaël Llodra	1; 6	4; 6

==== Chile vs. France ====
Chile
2
Düsseldorf, Germany
17 May 2005
clay

France
1

			1	2	3
1	(Chile) (France)	Nicolás Massú; Arnaud Clément	6; 4	6; 4
2	(Chile) (France)	Fernando González; Sébastien Grosjean	6; 4	6; 4
3	(Chile) (France)	Adrián García / Hermes Gamonal; Arnaud Clément / Michaël Llodra	3; 6	1; 6

==== Argentina vs. Czech Republic ====
Argentina
2
Düsseldorf, Germany
17 May 2005
clay

Czech Republic
1

			1	2	3
1	(Argentina) (Czech Republic)	Guillermo Coria; Jiří Novák	6; 3	7; 5
2	(Argentina) (Czech Republic)	Guillermo Cañas; Tomáš Berdych	6; 4	6; 2
3	(Argentina) (Czech Republic)	Juan Ignacio Chela / Gastón Gaudio; Tomáš Berdych / Jiří Novák	1; 6	7^{7} 6^{4}	2; 6

==== Argentina vs. Chile ====
Argentina
3
Düsseldorf, Germany
19 May 2005
clay

Chile
0

			1	2	3
1	(Argentina) (Chile)	Gastón Gaudio; Fernando González	6; 4	6; 2
2	(Argentina) (Chile)	Guillermo Cañas; Nicolás Massú	6; 2	1; 6	6; 3
3	(Argentina) (Chile)	Juan Ignacio Chela / Guillermo Coria; Adrián García / Hermes Gamonal	6; 4	6; 3

==== Czech Republic vs. France ====
Czech Republic
1
Düsseldorf, Germany
19 May 2005
clay

France
2

			1	2	3
1	(Czech Republic) (France)	Jiří Novák; Sébastien Grosjean	6^{5} 7^{7}	3; 6
2	(Czech Republic) (France)	Tomáš Berdych; Michaël Llodra	6; 2	6; 1
3	(Czech Republic) (France)	Tomáš Berdych / Jiří Novák; Arnaud Clément / Michaël Llodra	1; 6	1; 6

== Final ==
=== Argentina vs. Germany ===
Argentina
1
Düsseldorf, Germany
21 May 2005
clay

Germany
2

			1	2	3
1	(Argentina) (Germany)	Guillermo Coria; Florian Mayer	6; 1	6; 1
2	(Argentina) (Germany)	Gastón Gaudio; Tommy Haas	4; 6	3; 6
3	(Argentina) (Germany)	Guillermo Cañas / Guillermo Coria; Tommy Haas / Alexander Waske	1; 6	2; 6
