= 2009 ARAG World Team Cup =

Tennis tournament

2009 World Team Cup
- Date: 17–23 May
- Edition: 31st
- Category: World Team Cup
- Surface: Clay / outdoor
- Location: Düsseldorf, Germany
- Venue: Rochusclub

Champions
- Serbia
- World Team Cup

The 2009 ARAG World Team Cup was a tennis tournament play on outdoor clay courts. It was the 31st edition of the World Team Cup and was part of the 250 series of the 2009 ATP World Tour. It took place at the Rochusclub in Düsseldorf, Germany, from 17 May through 23 May 2009.

Sweden was the defending champions, but they failed to advance beyond the group stage. Serbia defeated Germany in the final, by two rubbers to one for their first title.

== Squads ==
=== Blue group ===
Argentina

- Juan Martín del Potro (# 5)
- Máximo González (# 77)
- Juan Mónaco (# 52)

Italy

- Simone Bolelli (# 59)
- Francesco Piccari (# 406)
- Andreas Seppi (# 54)

Russia

- Igor Andreev (# 27)
- Evgeny Korolev (# 102)
- Dmitry Tursunov (# 23)
- Stanislav Vovk (# 1137)

Serbia

- Janko Tipsarević (# 72)
- Viktor Troicki (# 37)
- Nenad Zimonjić (# 1 Doubles)

=== Red group ===
France

- Jérémy Chardy (# 39)
- Gilles Simon (# 15)
- Jo-Wilfried Tsonga (# 10)

Germany

- Nicolas Kiefer (# 113)
- Philipp Kohlschreiber (# 27)
- Rainer Schüttler (# 29)
- Mischa Zverev (# 53)

Sweden

- Robert Lindstedt (# 16 Doubles)
- Robin Söderling (# 9)
- Andreas Vinciguerra (# 657)

United States

- Mardy Fish (# 57)
- Robby Ginepri (# 102)
- Sam Querrey (# 25)

== Round robin ==
=== Blue group ===
==== Standings ====
| Pos. | Country | Points | Matches | Sets |
|---|---|---|---|---|
| 1. | Serbia | 3-0 | 7-2 | 14-5 |
| 2. | Argentina | 2-1 | 7-2 | 13-5 |
| 3. | Italy | 1-2 | 3-6 | 6-13 |
| 4. | Russia | 0-3 | 1-8 | 4-14 |

==== Russia vs. Italy ====
Russia
1
Düsseldorf, Germany
17–18 May 2009
clay

Italy
2

| | | | 1 | 2 | 3 |
|---|---|---|---|---|---|
| 1 | (Russia) (Italy) | Evgeny Korolev; Andreas Seppi | 6; 4 | 6; 4 |
| 2 | (Russia) (Italy) | Stanislav Vovk; Simone Bolelli | 6^{1} 7^{7} | 2; 6 |
| 3 | (Russia) (Italy) | Evgeny Korolev / Stanislav Vovk; Simone Bolelli / Andreas Seppi | 7^{7} 6^{4} | 3; 6 | 4; 10 |

==== Argentina vs. Serbia ====
Argentina
1
Düsseldorf, Germany
17–18 May 2009
clay

Serbia
2

| | | | 1 | 2 | 3 |
|---|---|---|---|---|---|
| 1 | (Argentina) (Serbia) | Máximo González; Viktor Troicki | 4; 6 | 1; 6 |
| 2 | (Argentina) (Serbia) | Juan Mónaco; Janko Tipsarević | 6; 4 | 7^{10} 6^{8} |
| 3 | (Argentina) (Serbia) | Juan Martín del Potro / Juan Mónaco; Nenad Zimonjić / Viktor Troicki | 6; 4 | 6^{4} 7 | 8; 10 |

==== Russia vs. Serbia ====
Russia
0
Düsseldorf, Germany
19–20 May 2009
clay

Serbia
3

| | | | 1 | 2 | 3 |
|---|---|---|---|---|---|
| 1 | (Russia) (Serbia) | Stanislav Vovk; Janko Tipsarević | 2; 6 | 4; 6 |
| 2 | (Russia) (Serbia) | Evgeny Korolev; Viktor Troicki | 2; 6 | 2; 6 |
| 3 | (Russia) (Serbia) | Evgeny Korolev / Stanislav Vovk; Nenad Zimonjić / Viktor Troicki | 1; 6 | 1; 6 |

==== Argentina vs. Italy ====
Argentina
3
Düsseldorf, Germany
19–20 May 2009
clay

Italy
0

| | | | 1 | 2 | 3 |
|---|---|---|---|---|---|
| 1 | (Argentina) (Italy) | Juan Martín del Potro; Andreas Seppi | 6; 3 | 6; 4 |
| 2 | (Argentina) (Italy) | Máximo González; Simone Bolelli | 6; 3 | 5; 7 | 6; 4 |
| 3 | (Argentina) (Italy) | Máximo González / Juan Martín del Potro; Francesco Piccari / Andreas Seppi | 6; 2 | 6; 3 |

==== Argentina vs. Russia ====
Argentina
3
Düsseldorf, Germany
21–22 May 2009
clay

Russia
0

| | | | 1 | 2 | 3 |
|---|---|---|---|---|---|---|
| 1 | (Argentina) (Russia) | Juan Martín del Potro; Igor Andreev | 6; 3 | 7^{7} 6^{4} |
| 2 | (Argentina) (Russia) | Máximo González; Evgeny Korolev | 6; 3 | 3; 6 | 6; 3 |
| 3 | (Argentina) (Russia) | Máximo González / Juan Martín del Potro; Evgeny Korolev / Dmitry Tursunov | 2; 2 | | | retired |

==== Serbia vs. Italy ====
Serbia
2
Düsseldorf, Germany
21–22 May 2009
clay

Italy
1

| | | | 1 | 2 | 3 |
|---|---|---|---|---|---|
| 1 | (Serbia) (Italy) | Viktor Troicki; Andreas Seppi | 1; 6 | 4; 6 |
| 2 | (Serbia) (Italy) | Janko Tipsarević; Francesco Piccari | 6; 2 | 6; 3 |
| 3 | (Serbia) (Italy) | Nenad Zimonjić / Viktor Troicki; Francesco Piccari / Andreas Seppi | 6; 0 | 7^{7} 6^{5} |

=== Red group ===
==== Standings ====
| Pos. | Country | Points | Matches | Sets |
|---|---|---|---|---|
| 1. | Germany | 3-0 | 7-2 | 15-8 |
| 2. | Sweden | 2-1 | 5-4 | 13-10 |
| 3. | United States | 1-2 | 4-5 | 11-13 |
| 4. | France | 0-3 | 2-7 | 8-16 |

==== Germany vs. USA ====
Germany
2
Düsseldorf, Germany
17–18 May 2009
clay

United States
1

| | | | 1 | 2 | 3 |
|---|---|---|---|---|---|
| 1 | (Germany) (United States) | Rainer Schüttler; Sam Querrey | 6; 2 | 4; 6 | 2; 6 |
| 2 | (Germany) (United States) | Philipp Kohlschreiber; Robby Ginepri | 6^{5} 7^{7} | 7^{7} 6^{4} | 6; 0 |
| 3 | (Germany) (United States) | Nicolas Kiefer / Mischa Zverev; Mardy Fish / Sam Querrey | 4; 6 | 6; 4 | 10; 1 |

==== France vs. Sweden ====
France
1
Düsseldorf, Germany
17–18 May 2009
clay

Sweden
2

| | | | 1 | 2 | 3 |
|---|---|---|---|---|---|
| 1 | (France) (Sweden) | Gilles Simon; Robin Söderling | 6; 4 | 2; 6 | 0; 6 |
| 2 | (France) (Sweden) | Jo-Wilfried Tsonga; Andreas Vinciguerra | 4; 6 | 6; 3 | 6; 4 |
| 3 | (France) (Sweden) | Jérémy Chardy / Jo-Wilfried Tsonga; Robert Lindstedt / Robin Söderling | 2; 6 | 6; 3 | 7; 10 |

==== Germany vs. France ====
Germany
3
Düsseldorf, Germany
19–20 May 2009
clay

France
0

| | | | 1 | 2 | 3 |
|---|---|---|---|---|---|
| 1 | (Germany) (France) | Rainer Schüttler; Gilles Simon | 6; 4 | 6; 4 |
| 2 | (Germany) (France) | Philipp Kohlschreiber; Jo-Wilfried Tsonga | 6^{2} 7^{7} | 6; 3 | 6; 3 |
| 3 | (Germany) (France) | Nicolas Kiefer / Mischa Zverev; Jérémy Chardy / Gilles Simon | 6; 0 | 6; 4 |

==== USA vs. Sweden ====
United States
1
Düsseldorf, Germany
19–20 May 2009
clay

Sweden
2

| | | | 1 | 2 | 3 |
|---|---|---|---|---|---|
| 1 | (United States) (Sweden) | Sam Querrey; Robin Söderling | 2; 6 | 2; 6 |
| 2 | (United States) (Sweden) | Robby Ginepri; Andreas Vinciguerra | 5; 7 | 4; 6 |
| 3 | (United States) (Sweden) | Mardy Fish / Sam Querrey; Robert Lindstedt / Robin Söderling | 2; 6 | 6; 2 | 10; 3 |

==== France vs. USA ====
France
1
Düsseldorf, Germany
21 May 2009
clay

United States
2

| | | | 1 | 2 | 3 |
|---|---|---|---|---|---|
| 1 | (France) (United States) | Gilles Simon; Sam Querrey | 5; 7 | 3; 6 |
| 2 | (France) (United States) | Jo-Wilfried Tsonga; Robby Ginepri | 3; 6 | 6; 2 | 6; 4 |
| 3 | (France) (United States) | Jérémy Chardy / Gilles Simon; Mardy Fish / Sam Querrey | 6; 2 | 4; 6 | 7; 10 |

==== Sweden vs. Germany ====
Sweden
1
Düsseldorf, Germany
21–22 May 2009
clay

Germany
2

| | | | 1 | 2 | 3 |
|---|---|---|---|---|---|
| 1 | (Sweden) (Germany) | Robin Söderling; Rainer Schüttler | 6; 0 | 6; 0 |
| 2 | (Sweden) (Germany) | Andreas Vinciguerra; Philipp Kohlschreiber | 1; 6 | 2; 6 |
| 3 | (Sweden) (Germany) | Robert Lindstedt / Robin Söderling; Nicolas Kiefer / Mischa Zverev | 6^{4} 7^{7} | 6; 4 | 11; 13 |

== Final ==
=== Serbia vs. Germany ===
Serbia
2
Düsseldorf, Germany
23 May 2009
clay

Germany
1

| | | | 1 | 2 | 3 |
|---|---|---|---|---|---|
| 1 | (Serbia) (Germany) | Viktor Troicki; Rainer Schüttler | 6; 4 | 7^{7} 6^{5} |
| 2 | (Serbia) (Germany) | Janko Tipsarević; Philipp Kohlschreiber | 6; 2 | 6; 4 |
| 3 | (Serbia) (Germany) | Nenad Zimonjić / Viktor Troicki; Nicolas Kiefer / Mischa Zverev | 5; 7 | 6; 4 | 7; 10 |
