= Ergis (company) =

Grupa Ergis
- Type: Joint-stock company
- Traded as: EGS:WSE
- ISIN: PLEUFLM00017
- Industry: Chemical industry
- Founded: 1998; 28 years ago
- Headquarters: Warsaw, Poland
- Key people: Tadeusz Nowicki (President)
- Products: LLDPE stretch films, PVC soft insulating and specialist films, rigid PET, PET/PE and PVC films for food and medicines packaging, PET strapping tapes, PVC compounds, flexible laminates for food packaging, PET flakes, BOPP films
- Number of employees: 834 (2016)
- Website: ergis.eu

Ergis Spółka Akcyjna is a Polish chemical company that processes plastics and manufactures PVC, PET and PE products. It is listed on the Warsaw Stock Exchange.

Its products include LLDPE stretch films (including nanoERGIS films), PVC soft insulating and specialist films, rigid PET, PET/PE and PVC films for food and medicines packaging, PET strapping tapes, PVC compounds, flexible laminates for food packaging, PET flakes, BOPP films. The company is headquartered in Warsaw, while its production facilities are located in Wąbrzeźno and Oława (both in Poland).

== Group ==
Ergis S.A. is the parent of the Ergis group, which is a collection of such companies as:

- Rigid Films Division

MKF-Ergis Sp. z o.o. located in Wąbrzeźno (Poland)

MKF-Ergis GmbH located in Berlin (Germany)

Schimanski-Ergis GmbH

- Flexergis Sp. z o.o. – a producer of flexible printed laminates for food packaging located in Nowy Sącz (Poland).
- CS Recycling Sp. z o.o. – a plastic recycling company located in Płock (Poland).
- Numeratis Sp. z o.o. – a company providing accounting, HR and payroll services.
- Transgis Sp. z o.o. – la company providing transport services.

== History ==
The history of Ergis in chronological order:

- 1922 – Establishment of a felt factory in Wąbrzeźno;
- 1950 – Creation of state-owned enterprise Pomorskie Zakłady Tworzyw Sztucznych w Wąbrzeźnie
- 1998
  - Change of name to Ergis Spółka Akcyjna;
  - Creation of the Ergis Group as a result of take-over of Schuepbach-Erg Sp. z o.o. and Delpak Sp. z o.o.;
- 1999 – Merger of Ergis S.A., ZTS Erg, ZTS Erg-Oława S.A. and Cefol-Erg S.A.;
- 2000 – joint venture with Eurofilms, establishment of Eurofilms Polska Grupa Ergis Sp. z o.o.;
- 2003 – Take-over of control of the ERGIS Group by Finergis sp. z o.o. – a company created with the involvement of the DBG EE Fund and the President of the Management Board Tadeusz Nowicki and the Chairman of the Supervisory Board Marek Górski;
- 2006 – IPO of Eurofilms S.A. on the Warsaw Stock Exchange;
- 2007:
  - Take-over of Flexergis sp. z o.o.;
  - Creation of Ergis-Eurofilms S.A. as a result of merger between Ergis S.A. and Eurofilms S.A.;
  - Take-over of MKF-Folien GmbH and Schimanski GmbH;
- 2014 – Change of name to Ergis S.A.
