= Tadeusz Nowicki (tennis) =

Polish tennis player

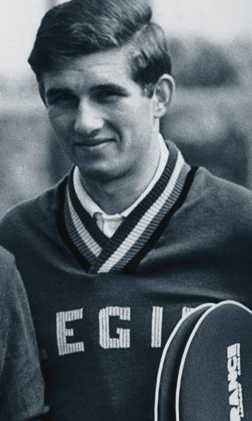
- Full name: Tadeusz Nowicki
- Country (sports): Poland
- Born: 7 August 1946 Łódź, Poland

Singles
- Career record: 15–22
- Career titles: 0

Grand Slam singles results
- French Open: 4R (1971)
- Wimbledon: 1R (1969, 1973, 1974)

Doubles
- Career record: 3–16
- Career titles: 0

Grand Slam doubles results
- French Open: 2R (1971)
- Wimbledon: 2R (1969)

Tadeusz Nowicki (born 7 August 1946) was a professional tennis player from Poland.

== Biography ==
=== Career ===
Born in Łódź, Nowicki was a five time national champion.

He competed regularly at the French Open and Wimbledon Championships. His best performance came at the 1971 French Open, where he made the fourth round with wins over Jim McManus, Vladimir Korotkov and Frew McMillan. In the fourth round, he lost in four sets to eventual finalist Ilie Năstase.

On the Grand Prix circuit, he made it to the semi-final stage once, at Nice in 1973. En route, he defeated a young Björn Borg. He was a quarter-finalist at the 1974 Austrian Open Kitzbühel.

Nowicki had a long Davis Cup career for Poland, featuring 25 ties across 16 years. He was awarded a Davis Cup Commitment Award for his service to the Polish team. He also represented Poland in the 1978 Nations Cup.

=== Coaching ===
A former Davis Cup captain, 1.Bundesliga head coach of OTHC Oberhausen for more than 10 years, head coach of THC im VfL Bochum for more than 30 years and TGF Bochum for many years.

== See also ==
- List of Poland Davis Cup team representatives
