= Tadeusz Nowicki (industrialist) =

Polish industrialist

- Tadeusz Nowicki
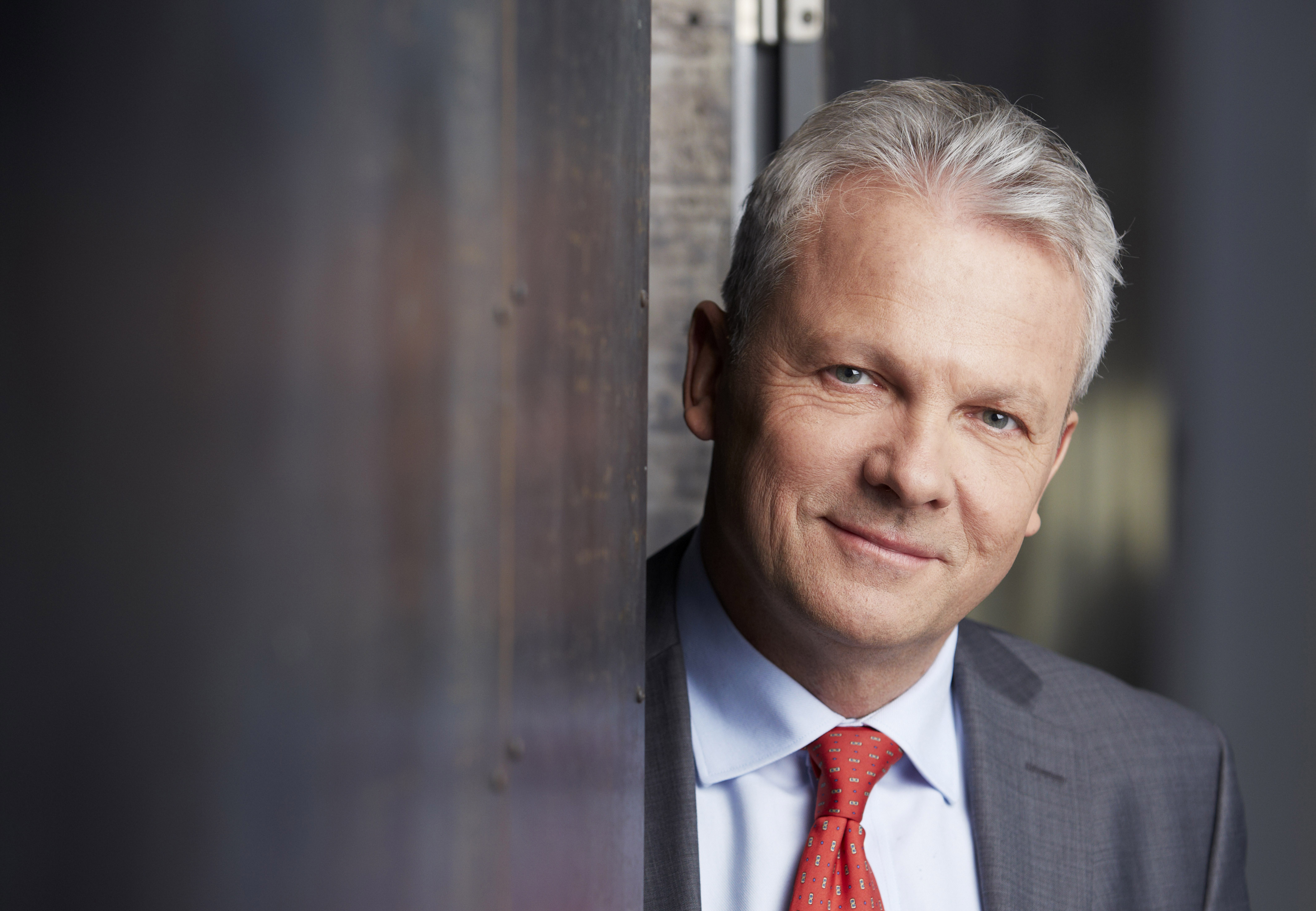
- Born: 1958 (age 67–68)
- Education: Doctor
- Alma mater: Wydział Inżynierii Materiałowej Politechniki Warszawskiej; Ecole Nationale Superieure des Mines
- Occupation: Industrialist

Tadeusz (Thadée) Nowicki (born 1958) is an industrialist who is the founder and president of the ERGIS Group.

Having graduated from Gottwald Secondary School (currently Staszic Secondary School) in Warsaw in 1977, he began studies at the Warsaw University of Technology where he obtained a master's degree in materials science. He was one of the founders and the first Vice-President of the anti-regime students' organization, Independent Students’ Association (NZS), at the Warsaw University of Technology. In 1981, after the introduction of martial law in Poland by Jaruzelski, he was interned along with other members of the opposition in Białołęka until 17 July 1982. In March 1983, he defended his master’s dissertation written in the internment camp, and after suspension of the martial law, with support from the French Le Goff intellectuals committee, was given permission to go to France to prepare his doctorate thesis at École Nationale Supérieure des Mines (Saint Etienne).

Tadeusz Nowicki began his professional career in 1985 as a researcher in the French Ministry of Industry.

Together with J.M. Penisson and M. Biscondi, he conducted an experiment that involved direct observation of atomic positions in grain boundaries in the presence of foreign atoms, using a high-resolution transmission electron microscope.

In 1989, he joined Comptoir Lyon-Alemand, Louyot et Cie, the French leader in precious metals processing, as head of metallurgical research. After a merger with the American group Engelhard Metals, he became Technical Director of the Platinum Division at Engelhard-Clal, responsible for technical issues in factories in Paris, London, and Amsterdam.

In January 1998, he became involved in the reconstruction of industry in Poland and through eight mergers and acquisitions created the ERGIS Group, which has been listed on the Warsaw Stock Exchange since 2006. Together with Marek Górski and Jacek Korpała, he conducted a management buy-out and acquisition of MKF-Folien GmbH based in Berlin and Schimanski GmbH based near Hamburg, which became part of the ERGIS Group, the Polish leader in plastics processing.

Tadeusz Nowicki has inspired and participated in the implementation of a new technology for nano-layer stretch films.

Since 2007, he has been serving as the President of the Management Board of the Polish Union of Plastics Converters (PZPTS/PUPC), a member of the Polish Confederation Lewiatan – main organisation of Polish employers. In 2022, he became Vice-President of European Plastics Converters (EuPC), and in 2025, he was appointed Vice-Chairman of the Main Council of the Lewiatan Confederation.
