= 1978 Nations Cup (tennis) =

- Date: May 8–15
- Edition: 2nd
- Category: Grand Prix circuit
- Draw: 8 teams
- Prize money: £100,000
- Surface: Clay / outdoor
- Location: Düsseldorf, West Germany
- Venue: Rochusclub

Champions
- Spain
- Nations Cup

The 1978 Nations Cup, also known by its sponsored name Ambre Solaire Nations Cup, was a men's team tennis tournament played on outdoor clay courts. It was the second edition of the Nations Cup and the event was part of the 1978 Grand Prix circuit. It took place at the Rochusclub in Düsseldorf in West Germany from 8 May through 15 May 1978. Total prize money was £100,000 and in total 36,000 people attended the event. The United States were the defending champions. Spain defeated Australia in the final, watched by a crowd of nearly 7,000, to win the title for the first time and earn the $60,000 first-prize money.

The draw consisted of eight teams divided over two round-robin groups. The two best ranked teams from each group proceeded to the semifinals. Each match consisted of two singles and a doubles.

== Players ==
=== Section A ===
Chile

- Hans Gildemeister
- Jaime Fillol
- Patricio Cornejo

West Germany

- Rolf Gehring
- Jürgen Fassbender
- Uli Pinner

Italy

- Paolo Bertolucci
- Adriano Panatta
- Antonio Zugarelli

Spain

- José Higueras
- Manuel Orantes

=== Section B ===
Australia

- Phil Dent
- John Newcombe

United Kingdom

- John Lloyd
- Buster Mottram

Poland

- Wojciech Fibak
- Tadeusz Nowicki

United States

- Bob Lutz
- Harold Solomon
- Roscoe Tanner

== Round robin ==
=== Section A ===
==== Standings ====
| Pos. | Country | Points | Matches | Sets |
|---|---|---|---|---|
| 1 | Italy | 3–0 | 6–2 | 13–9 |
| 2 | Spain | 2–1 | 5–4 | 13–10 |
| 3 | Chile | 1–2 | 4–5 | 9–13 |
| 4 | West Germany | 0–3 | 3–6 | 10–13 |

==== Spain vs. West Germany ====
Spain
2
Düsseldorf, West Germany
May 1978
Clay

West Germany
1

| | | | 1 | 2 | 3 |
|---|---|---|---|---|---|
| 1 | (Spain) (West Germany) | Manuel Orantes; Jürgen Fassbender | 7; 5 | 2; 6 | 6; 1 |
| 2 | (Spain) (West Germany) | José Higueras; Uli Pinner | 6; 3 | 6; 3 |
| 3 | (Spain) (West Germany) | Manuel Orantes / José Higueras; Uli Pinner / Jürgen Fassbender | 6; 2 | 5; 7 | 3; 6 |

==== Italy vs. Chile ====
Italy
2
Düsseldorf, West Germany
May 1978
Clay

Chile
1

| | | | 1 | 2 | 3 |
|---|---|---|---|---|---|
| 1 | (Italy) (Chile) | Adriano Panatta; Jaime Fillol | 6; 3 | 6; 1 |
| 2 | (Italy) (Chile) | Paolo Bertolucci; Hans Gildemeister | 6; 3 | 3; 6 | 5; 7 |
| 3 | (Italy) (Chile) | Adriano Panatta / Paolo Bertolucci; Patricio Cornejo / Jaime Fillol | 6; 4 | 6; 4 |

==== Chile vs. West Germany ====
Chile
2
Düsseldorf, West Germany
May 1978
Clay

West Germany
1

| | | | 1 | 2 | 3 |
|---|---|---|---|---|---|
| 1 | (Chile) (West Germany) | Jaime Fillol; Jürgen Fassbender | 6; 4 | 1; 6 | 6; 3 |
| 2 | (Chile) (West Germany) | Hans Gildemeister; Uli Pinner | 4; 6 | 5; 7 |
| 3 | (Chile) (West Germany) | Patricio Cornejo / Jaime Fillol; Jürgen Fassbender / Uli Pinner | 6; 4 | 7; 6 |

==== Italy vs. Spain ====
Italy
2
Düsseldorf, West Germany
May 1978
Clay

Spain
1

| | | | 1 | 2 | 3 |
|---|---|---|---|---|---|
| 1 | (Italy) (Spain) | Adriano Panatta; Manuel Orantes | 7; 6 | 6; 7 | 6; 3 |
| 2 | (Italy) (Spain) | Paolo Bertolucci; José Higueras | 2; 6 | 4; 6 |
| 3 | (Italy) (Spain) | Adriano Panatta / Paolo Bertolucci; Manuel Orantes / José Higueras | 6; 1 | 6; 3 |

==== Italy vs. West Germany ====
Italy
2
Düsseldorf, West Germany
May 1978
Clay

West Germany
1

| | | | 1 | 2 | 3 |
|---|---|---|---|---|---|
| 1 | (Italy) (West Germany) | Adriano Panatta; Jürgen Fassbender | 5; 7 | 4; 6 |
| 2 | (Italy) (West Germany) | Paolo Bertolucci; Rolf Gehring | 6; 4 | 3; 6 | 6; 4 |
| 3 | (Italy) (West Germany) | Adriano Panatta / Paolo Bertolucci; Jürgen Fassbender / Rolf Gehring | 6; 7 | 7; 6 | 7; 6 |

==== Spain vs. Chile ====
Spain
2
Düsseldorf, West Germany
May 1978
Clay

Chile
1

| | | | 1 | 2 | 3 |
|---|---|---|---|---|---|
| 1 | (Spain) (Chile) | Manuel Orantes; Jaime Fillol | 6; 2 | 6; 4 |
| 2 | (Spain) (Chile) | José Higueras; Hans Gildemeister | 6; 4 | 2; 6 | 7; 5 |
| 3 | (Spain) (Chile) | Manuel Orantes / José Higueras; Jaime Fillol / Patricio Cornejo | 6; 4 | 6; 7 | 2; 6 |

=== Section B ===
==== Standings ====
| Pos. | Country | Points | Matches | Sets |
|---|---|---|---|---|
| 1 | United States | 3–0 | 6–3 | 14–6 |
| 2 | Australia | 2–1 | 5–4 | 10–10 |
| 3 | Great Britain | 1–2 | 4–5 | 10–11 |
| 4 | Poland | 0–3 | 3–6 | 7–14 |

==== USA vs. Australia ====
United States
2
Düsseldorf, West Germany
May 1978
Clay

Australia
1

| | | | 1 | 2 | 3 |
|---|---|---|---|---|---|
| 1 | (United States) (Australia) | Roscoe Tanner; Phil Dent | 6; 2 | 7; 6 |
| 2 | (United States) (Australia) | Harold Solomon; John Newcombe | 6; 4 | 6; 4 |
| 3 | (United States) (Australia) | Roscoe Tanner / Bob Lutz; Phil Dent / John Newcombe | 3; 6 | 6; 3 | 3; 6 |

==== Great Britain vs. Poland ====
Great Britain
2
Düsseldorf, West Germany
May 1978
Clay

Poland
1

| | | | 1 | 2 | 3 |
|---|---|---|---|---|---|
| 1 | (United Kingdom) (Poland) | Buster Mottram; Wojciech Fibak | 6; 3 | 2; 6 | 6; 7 |
| 2 | (United Kingdom) (Poland) | John Lloyd; Tadeusz Nowicki | 6; 2 | 6; 2 |
| 3 | (United Kingdom) (Poland) | John Lloyd / Buster Mottram; Wojciech Fibak / Tadeusz Nowicki | 2; 6 | 6; 2 | 7; 6 |

==== USA vs. Poland ====
United States
2
Düsseldorf, West Germany
May 1978
Clay

Poland
1

| | | | 1 | 2 | 3 |
|---|---|---|---|---|---|
| 1 | (United States) (Poland) | Roscoe Tanner; Wojciech Fibak | 6; 2 | 6; 4 |
| 2 | (United States) (Poland) | Harold Solomon; Tadeusz Nowicki | 6; 2 | 6; 2 |
| 3 | (United States) (Poland) | Roscoe Tanner / Bob Lutz; Wojciech Fibak / Tadeusz Nowicki | 6; 7 | 6; 0 | 3; 6 |

==== Australia vs. Great Britain ====
Australia
2
Düsseldorf, West Germany
May 1978
Clay

Great Britain
1

| | | | 1 | 2 | 3 |
|---|---|---|---|---|---|
| 1 | (Australia) (United Kingdom) | Phil Dent; Buster Mottram | 6; 2 | 7; 6 |
| 2 | (Australia) (United Kingdom) | John Newcombe; John Lloyd | 6; 7 | 2; 6 |
| 3 | (Australia) (United Kingdom) | Phil Dent / John Newcombe; John Lloyd / Buster Mottram | 2; 6 | 6; 3 | 7; 5 |

==== USA vs. Great Britain ====
United States
2
Düsseldorf, West Germany
May 1978
Clay

Great Britain
1

| | | | 1 | 2 | 3 |
|---|---|---|---|---|---|
| 1 | (United States) (United Kingdom) | Roscoe Tanner; Buster Mottram | 4; 6 | 6; 7 |
| 2 | (United States) (United Kingdom) | Harold Solomon; John Lloyd | 6; 3 | 6; 0 |
| 3 | (United States) (United Kingdom) | Roscoe Tanner / Bob Lutz; John Lloyd / Buster Mottram | 6; 3 | 7; 5 |

==== Australia vs. Poland ====
Australia
2
Düsseldorf, West Germany
May 1978
Clay

Poland
1

| | | | 1 | 2 | 3 |
|---|---|---|---|---|---|
| 1 | (Australia) (Poland) | Phil Dent; Wojciech Fibak | 0; 6 | 1; 6 |
| 2 | (Australia) (Poland) | John Newcombe; Tadeusz Nowicki | 7; 5 | 6; 1 |
| 3 | (Australia) (Poland) | Phil Dent / John Newcombe; Wojciech Fibak / Tadeusz Nowicki | 6; 2 | 6; 2 |

== Semifinal ==
=== Australia vs. Italy ===
Australia
3
Düsseldorf, Germany
May 1978
Clay

Italy
0

| | | | 1 | 2 | 3 |
|---|---|---|---|---|---|
| 1 | (Australia) (Italy) | Phil Dent; Adriano Panatta | 7; 6 | 5; 4 |
| 2 | (Australia) (Italy) | John Newcombe; Paolo Bertolucci | 6; 3 | 6; 2 |
| 3 | (Australia) (Italy) | John Newcombe / Phil Dent; Paolo Bertolucci / Antonio Zugarelli | 7; 6 | 5; 3 |

=== Spain vs. USA ===
Spain
2
Düsseldorf, Germany
May 1978
Clay

United States
1

| | | | 1 | 2 | 3 |
|---|---|---|---|---|---|
| 1 | (Spain) (United States) | Manuel Orantes; Roscoe Tanner | 6; 4 | 7; 6 |
| 2 | (Spain) (United States) | José Higueras; Harold Solomon | 6; 2 | 6; 2 |
| 3 | (Spain) (United States) | Manuel Orantes / José Higueras; Harold Solomon / Bob Lutz | 6; 2 | 4; 6 | 5; 7 |

== Final ==
=== Spain vs. Australia ===
Spain
2
Düsseldorf, Germany
16 May 1978
Clay

Australia
1

| | | | 1 | 2 | 3 |
|---|---|---|---|---|---|
| 1 | (Spain) (Australia) | José Higueras; John Newcombe | 6; 2 | 6; 3 |
| 2 | (Spain) (Australia) | Manuel Orantes; Phil Dent | 6; 3 | 6; 4 |
| 3 | (Spain) (Australia) | Manuel Orantes / José Higueras; John Newcombe / Phil Dent | 6; 7 | 4; 6 |

== See also ==
- 1978 Davis Cup
