= List of Australia Davis Cup team results =

This is a list of all Australia Davis Cup team results.

== Key ==
Key to Competition result colours
W	F	3rd or SF	ZF or QF	#R	RR	Z#	PO	A	NH

Until 1971: (W) Challenge Round winner; (F) Challenge Round finalist; (3rd) inter-zonal finalist; (ZF) zonal finalist; (#R) rounds 4, 3, 2, 1; (A) absent; (NH) not held.
From 1972: (W) winner; (F) finalist; (SF) semifinalist; (QF) quarterfinalist or zonal finalist; (#R) rounds 4, 3, 2, 1, 1R^{#} (won in World Group playoff) or 1R^{†} (lost in World Group playoff); (QR) Qualifying Round; (RR) round-robin stage; (Z#) Davis Cup Zonal Group (with number indication), (PO) lost in World Group play-off or (PO^{*}) won in World Group playoff; (A) absent; (NH) not held.
To avoid confusion and double counting, these charts are updated at the conclusion of a tournament or when the team's participation has ended.

Key to Match result colours

Win Loss w/o
Challenge Round or Davis Cup Final win Challenge Round or Davis Cup Final loss

== All matches ==
=== 1900s ===
Year	Result	Competition	Date	Surface	Location	Opponent	Score
1905	3rd	Qualifying Rounds, Semifinals	13–15 Jul	Grass	London (GBR) (Note: Queen's Club)	Austria	5–0
1905	3rd	Qualifying Rounds, Final	17–19 Jul	Grass	London (GBR)	United States	0–5
1906	3rd	Qualifying Rounds, Semifinals	—	—	—	Austria	w/o
1906	3rd	Qualifying Rounds, Final	7–9 Jun	Grass	Newport (GBR) (Note: Newport Athletic Club)	United States	2–3
1907	W	Qualifying Rounds, Final	13–16 Jul	Grass	Wimbledon (GBR) (Note: Worple Road)	United States	3–2
1907	W	Challenge Round	20–24 Jul	Grass	Wimbledon (GBR)	British Isles	3–2
1908	W	Challenge Round	27–30 Nov	Grass	Melbourne (AUS) (Note: Albert Ground)	United States	3–2
1909	W	Challenge Round	27–30 Nov	Grass	Sydney (AUS) (Note: Double Bay Grounds)	United States	5–0

=== 1910s ===
Year	Result	Competition	Date	Surface	Location	Opponent	Score
1911	W	Challenge Round	1–3 Jan (1912)	Grass	Christchurch (NZL) (Note: Lancaster Park)	United States	4–0
1912	F	Challenge Round	28–30 Nov	Grass	Melbourne (AUS)	British Isles	2–3
1913	1R	Qualifying Rounds, Quarterfinals	6–9 Jun	Grass	New York (USA) (Note: West Side Tennis Club)	United States	1–4
1914	W	Qualifying Rounds, Quarterfinals	23–25 Jul	Grass	Forest Lake (USA) (Note: Onwentsia)	Canada	5–0
1914	W	Qualifying Rounds, Semifinals	30 Jul–1 Aug	Grass	Pittsburgh (USA) (Note: Allegheny County Club)	Germany	5–0
1914	W	Qualifying Rounds, Final	6–8 Aug	Grass	Boston (USA) (Note: Longwood Cricket Club)	Great Britain	3–2
1914	W	Challenge Round	13–15 Aug	Grass	New York (USA)	United States	3–2
1919	W	Challenge Round	16–21 Jan (1920)	Grass	Sydney (AUS)	Great Britain	4–1

=== 1920s ===
Year	Result	Competition	Date	Surface	Location	Opponent	Score
1920	F	Challenge Round	30 Dec–1 Jan	Grass	Auckland (NZL) (Note: Domain Cricket Club)	United States	0–5
1921	3rd	Qualifying Rounds, First round	23–27 Jul	Clay	Toronto (CAN) (Note: Toronto Lawn Tennis Club)	Canada	5–0
1921	3rd	Qualifying Rounds, Quarterfinals	4–6 Aug	Grass	Pittsburgh (USA)	Great Britain	3–2
1921	3rd	Qualifying Rounds, Semifinals	19–21 Aug	Grass	Cleveland (USA) (Note: Mayfield Country Club)	Denmark	5–0
1921	3rd	Qualifying Rounds, Final	22–27 Aug	Grass	Newport (USA) (Note: Newport Casino)	Japan	1–4
1922	F	Qualifying Rounds, First round	22–24 Jun	Grass	Scarborough (GBR) (Note: Yorkshire Lawn Tennis Club)	Belgium	4–0
1922	F	Qualifying Rounds, Quarterfinal	14–15 Jul	Clay	London (GBR) (Note: Roehampton Lawn Tennis Club)	Czechoslovakia	5–0
1922	F	Qualifying Rounds, Semifinal	10–14 Aug	Grass	Boston (USA)	France	4–1
1922	F	Qualifying Rounds, Final	17–19 Aug	Grass	Philadelphia (USA) (Note: Germantown Cricket Club)	Spain	4–1
1922	F	Challenge Round	1–5 Sep	Grass	Forest Hills (USA)	United States	1–4
1923	F	America Zone, Semifinal	26–28 Jul	Grass	Orange (USA) (Note: Orange Lawn Tennis Club)	Hawaii	4–1
1923	F	America Zone, Final	9–12 Aug	Grass	Chicago (USA) (Note: South Side Tennis Club)	Japan	4–1
1923	F	Inter-zonal Final	16–18 Aug	Grass	Boston (USA)	France	4–1
1923	F	Challenge Round	31 Aug–3 Sep	Grass	Forest Hills (USA)	United States	1–4
1924	F	America Zone, Quarterfinal	31 Jul–1 Aug	Grass	Brooklyn (USA) (Note: Crescent Athletic Club)	China	5–0
1924	F	America Zone, Semifinal	7–9 Aug	Grass	Baltimore (USA) (Note: Baltimore Country Club)	Mexico	5–0
1924	F	America Zone, Final	14–16 Aug	Grass	Providence (USA) (Note: Agawam Hunt Club)	Japan	5–0
1924	F	Inter-zonal Final	4–6 Sep	Grass	Boston (USA)	France	3–2
1924	F	Challenge Round	11–13 Sep	Grass	Philadelphia (USA)	United States	0–5
1925	3rd	America Zone, Quarterfinal	1 Jul	—	—	Hawaii	w/o
1925	3rd	America Zone, Semifinal	13–15 Aug	Grass	Montreal (CAN) (Note: Mount Royal Tennis Club)	Canada	5–0
1925	3rd	America Zone, Final	20–22 Aug	Grass	Boston (USA)	Japan	4–1
1925	3rd	Inter-zonal Final	4–5 Sep	Grass	Forest Hills (USA)	France	1–3
1928	1R	Europe Zone, First Round	4–9 May	Clay	Genoa (ITA)	Italy	1–4

=== 1930s ===
Year	Result	Competition	Date	Surface	Location	Opponent	Score
1930	4R	Europe Zone, First Round	2–4 May	N/A	Zürich (SUI)	Switzerland	5–0
1930	4R	Europe Zone, Second Round	15–17 May	Grass	Dublin (IRE) (Note: Fitzwilliam Lawn Tennis Club)	Ireland	4–1
1930	4R	Europe Zone, Quarterfinals	6–9 Jun	Grass	Eastbourne (GBR) (Note: Devonshire Park Lawn Tennis Club)	Great Britain	4–1
1930	4R	Europe Zone, Semifinals	14–16 Jun	Clay	Milan (ITA)	Italy	2–3
1932	3R	North & Central America Zone, Semifinals	13–15 May	N/A	Havana (CUB) (Note: Ferroviario Tennis Club)	Cuba	5–0
1932	3R	North & Central America Zone, Final	27–30 May	Clay	Philadelphia (USA) (Note: Philadelphia Country Club)	United States	0–5
1933	ZF	Europe Zone, Second Round	12–14 May	Clay	Oslo (NOR)	Norway	5–0
1933	ZF	Europe Zone, Quarterfinals	10–13 Jun	Grass	London (GBR)	South Africa	3–2
1933	ZF	Europe Zone, Semifinals	17–19 Jun	Clay	Paris (FRA) (Note: Stade Roland Garros)	Japan	3–2
1933	ZF	Europe Zone, Final	13–15 Jul	Grass	Wimbledon (GBR) (Note: Centre Court)	Great Britain	2–3
1934	3rd	Europe Zone, Quarterfinals	7–9 Jun	Grass	Eastbourne (GBR)	Japan	4–1
1934	3rd	Europe Zone, Semifinals	15–17 Jun	Clay	Paris (FRA)	France	3–2
1934	3rd	Europe Zone, Final	13–15 Jul	Clay	Prague (TCH)	Czechoslovakia	3–2
1934	3rd	Inter-Zonal Final	21–25 Jul	Grass	Wimbledon (GBR)	United States	2–3
1935	3R	Europe Zone, First Round	12–14 May	Grass	Eastbourne (GBR)	New Zealand	3–0
1935	3R	Europe Zone, Quarterfinals	8–10 Jun	Clay	Paris (FRA)	France	3–2
1935	3R	Europe Zone, Semifinals	14–16 Jun	Clay	Berlin (GER) (Note: Rot-Weiss Tennis Club)	Germany	1–4
1936	F	America Zone, Semifinals	10–12 Apr	—	—	Cuba	w/o
1936	F	America Zone, Final	30 May–1 Jun	Grass	Philadelphia (USA)	United States	3–2
1936	F	Inter-Zonal Final	18–21 Jul	Grass	Wimbledon (GBR) (Note: No. 1 Court (Wimbledon))	Germany	3–2
1936	F	Challenge Round	25–28 Jul	Grass	Wimbledon (GBR)	Great Britain	2–3
1937	ZF	America Zone, Semifinals	30 Apr–2 May	Clay	Mexico City (MEX) (Note: Centro Deportivo Chapultepec)	Mexico	5–0
1937	ZF	America Zone, Final	29–31 May	Grass	Forest Hills (USA)	United States	0–5
1938	F	America Zone, Semifinals	29–31 Jul	Clay	Kansas City (USA) (Note: Rockhill Tennis Club)	Mexico	5–0
1938	F	America Zone, Final	12–14 Aug	Grass	Montreal (CAN)	Japan	3–1
1938	F	Inter-Zonal Final	18–20 Aug	Grass	Boston (USA)	Germany	5–0
1938	F	Challenge Round	3–5 Sep	Grass	Philadelphia (USA)	bUnited States	2–3
1939	W	North & Central America Zone, Quarterfinals	30 Jun–2 Jul	Clay	Mexico City (MEX)	Mexico	5–0
1939	W	North & Central America Zone, Semifinals	14–16 Jul	Grass	Long Beach (USA) (Note: Long Beach Tennis Club)	Philippines	5–0
1939	W	North & Central America Zone, Final	10–12 Aug	Grass	Rumson (USA) (Note: Seabright Lawn Tennis and Cricket Club)	Cuba	5–0
1939	W	Americas Inter-Zonal Final	—	—	—	Brazil	w/o
1939	W	Inter-Zonal Final	24–26 Aug	Grass	Boston (USA)	Yugoslavia	4–1
1939	W	Challenge Round	2–5 Sep	Grass	Haverford (USA) (Note: Merion Cricket Club)	United States	3–2

=== 1940s ===
Year	Result	Competition	Date	Surface	Location	Opponent	Score
1946	F	Challenge Round	26–30 Dec	Grass	Melbourne (AUS) (Note: Kooyong Stadium)	United States	0–5
1947	F	America Zone, Final	8–10 Aug	Grass	Montreal (CAN)	Canada	5–0
1947	F	Inter-Zonal Final	14–16 Aug	Grass	Montreal (CAN)	Czechoslovakia	4–1
1947	F	Challenge Round	30 Aug–1 Sep	Grass	Forest Hills (USA)	United States	1–4
1948	F	America Zone, Semifinals	23–25 Jul	N/A	Havana (CUB)	Cuba	5–0
1948	F	America Zone, Final	6–8 Aug	Clay	Mexico City (MEX)	Mexico	4–1
1948	F	Inter-Zonal Final	19–22 Aug	Grass	Boston (USA)	Czechoslovakia	3–2
1948	F	Challenge Round	4–6 Sep	Grass	Forest Hills (USA)	United States	0–5
1949	F	America Zone, Semifinals	21–23 Jul	Grass	Montreal (CAN)	Canada	4–1
1949	F	America Zone, Final	29–31 Jul	Grass	Wilmington (USA) (Note: Wilmington Country Club)	Mexico	5–0
1949	F	Inter-Zonal Final	12–15 Aug	Grass	Rye (USA) (Note: Westchester Country Club)	Italy	5–0
1949	F	Challenge Round	26–28 Aug	Grass	Forest Hills (USA)	United States	1–4

=== 1950s ===
Year	Result	Competition	Date	Surface	Location	Opponent	Score
1950	W	America Zone, Semifinal	14–16 Jul	Grass	Montreal (CAN)	Canada	5–0
1950	W	America Zone, Final	28–30 Jul	Clay	Mexico City (MEX)	Mexico	4–1
1950	W	Inter-Zonal Final	11–13 Aug	Grass	Rye (USA)	Sweden	3–2
1950	W	Challenge Round	25–27 Aug	Grass	Forest Hills (USA)	United States	4–1
1951	W	Challenge Round	26–28 Dec	Grass	Sydney (AUS) (Note: White City Stadium)	United States	3–2
1952	W	Challenge Round	29–31 Dec	Grass	Adelaide (AUS) (Note: Memorial Drive Park)	United States	4–1
1953	W	Challenge Round	28–31 Dec	Grass	Melbourne (AUS)	United States	3–2
1954	F	Challenge Round	27–29 Dec	Grass	Sydney (AUS)	United States	2–3
1955	W	America Zone, Quarterfinals	15–17 Jul	Clay	Chicago (USA) (Note: Sadde and Cycle Club)	Mexico	5–0
1955	W	America Zone, Semifinals	22–24 Jul	Grass	Louisville (USA) (Note: Louisville Boat Club)	Brazil	4–1
1955	W	America Zone, Final	29–31 Jul	Grass	Montreal (CAN)	Canada	5–0
1955	W	Inter-Zonal Stage, Semifinals	5–7 Aug	Grass	Long Island (USA) (Note: Glen Cove Tennis Club)	Japan	4–0
1955	W	Inter-Zonal Stage, Final	14–16 Aug	Grass	Philadelphia (USA)	Italy	5–0
1955	W	Challenge Round	26–28 Aug	Grass	Forest Hills (USA)	United States	5–0
1956	W	Challenge Round	26–28 Dec	Grass	Adelaide (AUS)	United States	5–0
1957	W	Challenge Round	26–28 Dec	Grass	Melbourne (AUS)	United States	3–2
1958	F	Challenge Round	29–31 Dec	Grass	Brisbane (AUS) (Note: Milton Courts)	United States	2–3
1959	W	North & Central America Zone, Semifinals	18–20 Jul	Clay	Mexico City (MEX)	Mexico	4–1
1959	W	North & Central America Zone, Final	24–26 Jul	Grass	Montreal (CAN)	Canada	5–0
1959	W	America Zone, Final	31 Jul–2 Aug	Grass	Montreal (CAN)	Cuba	5–0
1959	W	Inter-Zonal Stage, Semifinals	24–26 Jul	Grass	Philadelphia (USA)	Italy	4–1
1959	W	Inter-Zonal Stage, Final	14–16 Aug	Grass	Boston (USA)	India	4–1
1959	W	Challenge Round	28–31 Aug	Grass	Forest Hills (USA)	United States	3–2

=== 1960s ===
Year	Result	Competition	Date	Surface	Location	Opponent	Score
1960	W	Challenge Round	26–28 Dec	Grass	Sydney (AUS)	Italy	4–1
1961	W	Challenge Round	26–28 Dec	Grass	Melbourne (AUS)	Italy	5–0
1962	W	Challenge Round	26–28 Dec	Grass	Brisbane (AUS)	Mexico	5–0
1963	F	Challenge Round	26–28 Dec	Grass	Adelaide (AUS)	United States	2–3
1964	W	America Zone, Quarterfinals	17–19 Jul	Clay	Montreal (CAN)	Canada	5–0
1964	W	America Zone, Semifinals	1–3 Aug	Clay	Mexico City (MEX)	Mexico	4–1
1964	W	America Zone, Final	14–16 Aug	Hard	Minneapolis (USA) (Note: Nicolett Tennis Club)	Chile	5–0
1964	W	Inter-Zonal Final	29–31 Aug	Clay	Båstad (SWE) (Note: Båstad Tennis Stadium)	Sweden	5–0
1964	W	Challenge Round	25–28 Sep	Clay	Cleveland (USA) (Note: Harold Clark Courts)	United States	3–2
1965	W	Challenge Round	27–29 Dec	Grass	Sydney (AUS)	Spain	4–1
1966	W	Challenge Round	26–28 Dec	Grass	Melbourne (AUS)	India	4–1
1967	W	Challenge Round	26–28 Dec	Grass	Brisbane (AUS)	Spain	4–1
1968	F	Challenge Round	26–28 Dec	Grass	Adelaide (AUS)	United States	1–4
1969	R2	North & Central America Zone, Final	23–25 May	Clay	Mexico City (MEX)	Mexico	2–3

=== 1970s ===
Year	Result	Competition	Date	Surface	Location	Opponent	Score
1970	4R	Eastern Zone, Quarterfinals	—	—	—	South Korea	w/o
1970	4R	Eastern Zone, Semifinals	3–5 Apr	N/A	Manila (PHI)	Philippines	5–0
1970	4R	Eastern Zone, Final	17–19 Apr	N/A	Tokyo (JPN)	Japan	5–0
1970	4R	Eastern Inter-Zonal Final	3–5 May	N/A	Bangalore (IND)	India	1–3
1971	3R	Eastern Zone, Group A Quarterfinals	27–29 Mar	N/A	Hong Kong (HKG)	Hong Kong	5–0
1971	3R	Eastern Zone, Group A Semifinals	3–5 Apr	N/A	Jakarta (INA)	Indonesia	3–2
1971	3R	Eastern Zone, Group A Final	23–25 Apr	N/A	Tokyo (JPN)	Japan	2–3
1972	SF	Eastern Zone, Group A Semifinals	14–16 Apr	N/A	Seoul (KOR)	South Korea	5–0
1972	SF	Eastern Zone, Group A Final	28–30 Apr	N/A	Tokyo (JPN)	Japan	1–4
1972	SF	Eastern Inter-Zonal Final	16–18 May	N/A	Bangalore (IND)	India	5–0
1972	SF	Inter-Zonal Semifinal	4–7 Aug	Clay	Bucharest (ROU)	Romania	1–4
1973	W	Eastern Zone, Semifinals	20–22 Apr	N/A	Tokyo (JPN)	Japan	4–1
1973	W	Eastern Zone, Final	4–6 May	N/A	Madras (IND)	India	4–0
1973	W	Inter-Zonal Semifinals	16–18 Nov	Grass	Melbourne (AUS)	Czechoslovakia	4–1
1973	W	Inter-Zonal Final	30 Nov–2 Dec	Carpet (i)	Cleveland (USA) (Note: Public Auditorium)	United States	5–0
1974	ZF	Eastern Zone, Semifinals	3–5 May	N/A	Rawalpindi (PAK)	Pakistan	3–0
1974	ZF	Eastern Zone, Final	10–12 May	N/A	Calcutta (IND)	India	2–3
1975	SF	Eastern Zone, Semifinals	10–12 Jan	Grass	Adelaide (AUS) (Note: Memorial Drive Park)	Japan	4–1
1975	SF	Eastern Zone, Final	28 Feb–2 Mar	Grass	Auckland (NZL) (Note: Stanley Street)	New Zealand	4–0
1975	SF	Inter-Zonal Semifinal	26–28 Sep	Clay	Prague (TCH) (Note: Štvanice Stadium)	Czechoslovakia	1–3
1976	SF	Eastern Zone, Semifinals	9–11 Jan	Grass	Hobart (AUS) (Note: Domain Centre)	Indonesia	5–0
1976	SF	Eastern Zone, Final	27 Feb–1 Mar	Grass	Brisbane (AUS)	New Zealand	3–1
1976	SF	Inter-Zonal Semifinals	24–27 Sep	Clay	Rome (ITA) (Note: Foro Italico)	Italy	2–3
1977	W	Eastern Zone, Semifinals	21–23 Jan	Grass	Perth (AUS) (Note: Royal King's Park Tennis Club)	India	5–0
1977	W	Eastern Zone, Final	11–13 Feb	Grass	Auckland (NZL)	New Zealand	4–0
1977	W	Inter-Zonal Semifinals	14–16 Sep	Clay	Buenos Aires (ARG) (Note: Buenos Aires LTC)	Argentina	3–2
1977	W	Inter-Zonal Final	2–4 Dec	Grass	Sydney (AUS)	Italy	3–1
1978	SF	Eastern Zone, Semifinals	20–22 Jan	Clay	Tokyo (JPN) (Note: Denen Coliseum)	Japan	5–0
1978	SF	Eastern Zone, Final	24–26 Feb	Grass	Adelaide (AUS)	New Zealand	4–0
1978	SF	Inter-Zonal Semifinals	6–8 Oct	Carpet (i)	London (GBR) (Note: Crystal Palace National Sports Centre)	Great Britain	2–3
1979	SF	Eastern Zone, Semifinals	9–12 Feb	Clay	Madras (IND) (Note: Madras Gymkhana Club)	India	3–2
1979	SF	Eastern Zone, Final	16–19 Mar	Grass	Christchurch (NZL) (Note: Wilding Park)	New Zealand	3–2
1979	SF	Inter-Zonal Semifinals	5–8 Oct	Grass	Sydney (AUS)	United States	1–4

=== 1980s ===
Year	Result	Competition	Date	Surface	Location	Opponent	Score
1980	SF	Eastern Zone, Semifinals	8–10 Feb	Carpet	Hobart (AUS)	Japan	5–0
1980	SF	Eastern Zone, Semifinals	7–9 Mar	Grass	Brisbane (AUS)	New Zealand	3–1
1980	SF	Inter-Zonal Semifinals	19–21 Sep	Clay	Rome (ITA)	Italy	2–3
1981	SF	World Group, 1st Round	6–8 Mar	Carpet (i)	Lyon (FRA) (Note: Palais des Sports)	France	3–2
1981	SF	World Group, Quarterfinals	10–12 Jul	Clay	Båstad (SWE)	Sweden	3–1
1981	SF	World Group, Semifinals	2–4 Oct	Carpet (i)	Portland (USA) (Note: Memorial Coliseum)	United States	0–5
1982	SF	World Group, 1st Round	5–7 Mar	Clay	Mexico City (MEX) (Note: Estadio Rafael Osuna)	Mexico	3–2
1982	SF	World Group, Quarterfinals	9–11 Jul	Grass	Brisbane (AUS)	Chile	4–1
1982	SF	World Group, Semifinals	1–3 Oct	Carpet (i)	Perth (AUS) (Note: Perth Entertainment Centre)	United States	0–5
1983	W	World Group, 1st Round	6–8 Mar	Grass	Adelaide (AUS)	Great Britain	4–1
1983	W	World Group, Quarterfinals	8–10 Jul	Grass	Brisbane (AUS)	Romania	5–0
1983	W	World Group, Semifinals	30 Sep–2 Oct	Grass	Sydney (AUS)	France	4–1
1983	W	World Group, Final	26–28 Dec	Grass	Melbourne (AUS)	Sweden	3–2
1984	SF	World Group, 1st Round	24–26 Feb	Grass	Perth (AUS)	Yugoslavia	5–0
1984	SF	World Group, Quarterfinals	13–15 Jul	Grass	Brisbane (AUS)	Italy	5–0
1984	SF	World Group, Semifinals	28–30 Sep	Carpet (i)	Portland (USA)	United States	1–4
1985	SF	World Group, 1st Round	8–10 Mar	Clay (i)	Split (YUG)	Yugoslavia	3–2
1985	SF	World Group, Quarterfinals	2–4 Jul	Grass	Sydney (AUS)	Paraguay	3–2
1985	SF	World Group, Semifinals	4–6 Oct	Clay (i)	Malmö (SWE)	Sweden	0–5
1986	W	World Group, 1st Round	7–8 Mar	Hard	Auckland (NZL)	New Zealand	4–1
1986	W	World Group, Quarterfinals	18–20 Jul	Grass	Wimbledon (GBR)	Great Britain	4–1
1986	W	World Group, Semifinals	3–5 Oct	Grass	Brisbane (AUS)	United States	3–1
1986	W	World Group, Final	26–28 Dec	Grass	Melbourne (AUS)	Sweden	3–2
1987	SF	World Group, 1st Round	13–15 Mar	Grass	Adelaide (AUS)	Yugoslavia	4–1
1987	SF	World Group, Quarterfinals	24–26 Jul	Grass	Brisbane (AUS)	Mexico	4–1
1987	SF	World Group, Semifinals	4–6 Oct	Grass	Sydney (AUS)	India	2–3
1988	QF	World Group, 1st Round	5–8 Feb	Clay	Mexico City (MEX)	Mexico	3–2
1988	QF	World Group, Quarterfinals	8–10 Apr	Clay (i)	Clermont-Ferrand (FRA)	France	0–5
1989	1R	World Group, 1st Round	3–5 Feb	Clay (i)	Vienna (AUT)	Austria	0–5
1989	1R	World Group Playoffs	21–24 Jul	Clay	Lima (PER)	Peru	3–2

=== 1990s ===
Year	Result	Competition	Date	Surface	Location	Opponent	Score
1990	F	World Group, 1st Round	4–6 Feb	N/A	Perth (AUS)	France	3–2
1990	F	World Group, Quarterfinals	1–3 Apr	N/A	Brisbane (AUS)	New Zealand	3–2
1990	F	World Group, Semifinals	23–25 Sep	N/A	Sydney (AUS)	Argentina	5–0
1990	F	World Group, Final	30 Nov–2 Dec	N/A	St Petersburg (USA)	United States	2–3
1991	QF	World Group, 1st Round	1–3 Feb	N/A	Perth (AUS)	Belgium	5–0
1991	QF	World Group, Quarterfinals	5–7 May	N/A	Nîmes (FRA)	France	2–3
1992	QF	World Group, 1st Round	2–4 Feb	N/A	Nicosia (CYP)	Yugoslavia	5–0
1992	QF	World Group, Quarterfinals	29–31 Mar	N/A	Lund (SWE)	Sweden	0–5
1993	F	World Group, 1st Round	28–30 Mar	N/A	Melbourne (AUS)	United States	4–1
1993	F	World Group, Quarterfinals	18–20 Jul	N/A	Florence (ITA)	Italy	3–2
1993	F	World Group, Semifinals	26–28 Sep	N/A	Chandigarh (IND)	India	5–0
1993	F	World Group, Final	5–7 Dec	N/A	Düsseldorf (GER)	Germany	1–4
1994	1R^{#}	World Group, 1st Round	25–27 Mar	N/A	Saint Petersburg (RUS)	Russia	1–4
1994	1R^{#}	World Group Playoffs	23–25 Sep	N/A	Christchurch (NZL)	New Zealand	4–1
1995	1R^{†}	World Group, 1st Round	3–6 Feb	Hard	Durban (RSA)	South Africa	2–3
1995	1R^{†}	World Group Playoffs	22–24 Sep	Clay	Budapest (HUN)	Hungary	2–3
1996	Z1/PO^{*}	Asia/Oceania Group I, 1st Round	9–11 Feb	Hard (i)	Melbourne (AUS)	Chinese Taipei	3–0
1996	Z1/PO^{*}	Asia/Oceania Group I, Semifinals	5–7 Apr	Hard	Osaka (JPN)	Japan	5–0
1996	Z1/PO^{*}	World Group Playoffs	20–22 Sep	Clay	Split (CRO)	Croatia	4–1
1997	SF	World Group, 1st Round	7–9 Feb	Grass	Sydney (AUS)	France	4–1
1997	SF	World Group, Quarterfinals	4–6 Apr	Grass	Adelaide (AUS)	Czech Republic	5–0
1997	SF	World Group, Semifinals	19–21 Sep	Hard (i)	Washington, D.C. (USA)	United States	1–4
1998	1R^{#}	World Group, 1st Round	5–7 Apr	Grass	Mildura (AUS)	Zimbabwe	2–3
1998	1R^{#}	World Group Playoffs	27–29 Sep	Hard (i)	Townsville (AUS)	Uzbekistan	5–0
1999	W	World Group, 1st Round	4–6 Apr	Hard (i)	Harare (ZIM)	Zimbabwe	4–1
1999	W	World Group, Quarterfinals	18–20 Jul	Hard	Chestnut Hill (USA)	United States	4–1
1999	W	World Group, Semifinals	26–28 Sep	Grass	Brisbane (AUS)	Russia	4–1
1999	W	World Group, Final	5–7 Dec	Clay (i)	Nice (FRA)	France	3–2

=== 2000s ===
Year	Result	Competition	Date	Surface	Location	Opponent	Score
2000	F	World Group, 1st Round	6–8 Feb	Carpet (i)	Zürich (SUI)	Switzerland	3–2
2000	F	World Group, Quarterfinals	9–11 Apr	Grass	Adelaide (AUS)	Germany	3–2
2000	F	World Group, Semifinals	16–18 Jul	Grass	Brisbane (AUS)	Brazil	5–0
2000	F	World Group, Final	10–12 Dec	Clay (i)	Barcelona (ESP)	Spain	1–3
2001	F	World Group, 1st Round	9–11 Feb	Grass	Perth (AUS)	Ecuador	4–1
2001	F	World Group, Quarterfinals	6–8 Apr	Clay	Florianópolis (BRA)	Brazil	3–1
2001	F	World Group, Semifinals	21–23 Sep	Hard	Sydney (AUS)	Sweden	4–1
2001	F	World Group, Final	30 Nov–2 Dec	Grass	Melbourne (AUS)	France	2–3
2002	1R^{#}	World Group, 1st Round	10–12 Feb	Clay	Buenos Aires (ARG)	Argentina	0–5
2002	1R^{#}	World Group Playoffs	22–24 Sep	Hard	Adelaide (AUS)	India	5–0
2003	W	World Group, 1st Round	9–11 Feb	Clay	Sydney (AUS)	Great Britain	4–1
2003	W	World Group, Quarterfinals	6–8 Apr	Hard (i)	Malmö (SWE)	Sweden	5–0
2003	W	World Group, Semifinals	21–23 Sep	Hard	Melbourne (AUS)	Switzerland	3–2
2003	W	World Group, Final	30 Nov–2 Dec	Grass	Melbourne (AUS)	Spain	3–1
2004	1R^{#}	World Group, 1st Round	8–10 Feb	Hard	Adelaide (AUS)	Sweden	1–4
2004	1R^{#}	World Group Playoffs	26–28 Sep	Grass	Perth (AUS)	Morocco	4–1
2005	QF	World Group, 1st Round	6–8 Mar	Grass	Sydney (AUS)	Austria	5–0
2005	QF	World Group, Quarterfinals	17–19 Jul	Grass	Sydney (AUS)	Argentina	1–4
2006	SF	World Group, 1st Round	12–14 Feb	Clay (i)	Geneva (SUI)	Switzerland	3–2
2006	SF	World Group, Quarterfinals	9–11 Apr	Hard	Melbourne (AUS)	Belarus	5–0
2006	SF	World Group, Semifinals	24–26 Sep	Clay	Buenos Aires (ARG)	Argentina	0–5
2007	R1^{†}	World Group, 1st Round	11–13 Feb	Clay (i)	Liège (BEL)	Belgium	2–3
2007	R1^{†}	World Group Playoffs	23–25 Sep	Clay (i)	Belgrade (SRB)	Serbia	1–4
2008	Z1/PO	Asia/Oceania Group I, 1st Round	8–10 Feb	Hard	Kaohsiung (TPE)	Chinese Taipei	4–1
2008	Z1/PO	Asia/Oceania Group I, Semifinals	13–15 Apr	Hard (i)	Townsville (AUS)	Thailand	5–0
2008	Z1/PO	World Group Playoffs	21–23 Sep	Clay	Antofagasta (CHI)	Chile	2–3
2009	Z1/SF	Asia/Oceania Group I, Quarterfinals	8–10 Mar	Hard	Nonthaburi (THA)	Thailand	3–2
2009	Z1/SF	Asia/Oceania Group I, Semifinals	10–12 May	Hard	Chennai (IND)	India	w/o

=== 2010s ===
Year	Result	Competition	Date	Surface	Location	Opponent	Score
2010	PO	Asia/Oceania Group I, 1st Round	5–7 Mar	Hard	Melbourne (AUS)	Chinese Taipei	5–0
2010	PO	Asia/Oceania Group I, Semifinals	7–9 May	Clay	Brisbane (AUS)	Japan	5–0
2010	PO	World Group Playoffs	19–21 Sep	Hard	Cairns (AUS)	Belgium	2–3
2011	PO	Asia/Oceania Group I, Semifinal	8–10 Jul	Hard (i)	Beijing (CHN)	China	3–1
2011	PO	World Group Playoffs	16–18 Sep	Grass	Sydney (AUS)	Switzerland	2–3
2012	PO	Asia/Oceania Group I, 1st Round	10–12 Feb	Grass	Geelong (AUS)	China	5–0
2012	PO	Asia/Oceania Group I, Semifinals	6–8 Apr	Hard	Brisbane (AUS)	South Korea	5–0
2012	PO	World Group Playoffs	14–16 Sep	Clay	Hamburg (GER)	Germany	2–3
2013	PO^{*}	Asia/Oceania Group I, 1st Round	1–3 Feb	Hard	Kaohsiung (TPE)	Chinese Taipei	5–0
2013	PO^{*}	Asia/Oceania Group I, Semifinals	5–7 Apr	Clay (i)	Namangan (UZB)	Uzbekistan	3–1
2013	PO^{*}	World Group Playoffs	13–15 Sep	Clay (i)	Warsaw (POL)	Poland	4–1
2014	1R^{#}	World Group, 1st Round	31 Jan–2 Feb	Clay (i)	La Roche-sur-Yon (FRA)	France	0–5
2014	1R^{#}	World Group Playoffs	12–14 Sep	Grass	Perth (AUS)	Uzbekistan	5–0
2015	SF	World Group, 1st Round	6–8 Mar	Hard (i)	Ostrava (CZE)	Czech Republic	3–2
2015	SF	World Group Quarterfinals	17–19 Jul	Grass	Darwin (AUS)	Kazakhstan	3–2
2015	SF	World Group Semifinals	18–20 Sep	Hard (i)	Glasgow (GBR)	Great Britain	2–3
2016	1R^{#}	World Group, 1st round	4–6 Mar	Grass	Melbourne (AUS)	United States	1–3
2016	1R^{#}	World Group Playoffs	16–18 Sep	Grass	Sydney (AUS)	Slovakia	3–0
2017	SF	World Group, 1st round	3–5 Feb	Hard	Melbourne (AUS)	Czech Republic	4–1
2017	SF	World Group Quarterfinals	7–9 Apr	Hard	Brisbane (AUS)	United States	3–2
2017	SF	World Group Semifinals	15–17 Sep	Clay (i)	Brussels (BEL)	Belgium	2–3
2018	1R^{†}	World Group, 1st round	2–4 Feb	Hard	Brisbane (AUS)	Germany	1–3
2018	1R^{†}	World Group Playoffs	14–16 Sep	Clay	Graz (AUT)	Austria	1–3
2019	QF	Qualifying round	1–2 Feb	Hard	Adelaide (AUS)	Bosnia and Herzegovina	4–0
2019	QF	Finals, Group D	19 Nov	Hard (i)	Madrid (ESP)	Colombia	3–0
2019	QF	Finals, Group D	20 Nov	Hard (i)	Madrid (ESP)	Belgium	2–1
2019	QF	Finals, Quarterfinals	21 Nov	Hard (i)	Madrid (ESP)	Canada	1–2

=== 2020s ===
Year	Result	Competition	Date	Surface	Location	Opponent	Score
2020–21	RR	Qualifying round	6–7 Mar 2020	Hard	Adelaide (AUS)	Brazil	3–1
2020–21	RR	Finals, Group D	25 Nov 2021	Hard (i)	Turin (ITA) (Note: Pala Alpitour)	Croatia	0–3
2020–21	RR	Finals, Group D	27 Nov 2021	Hard (i)	Turin (ITA)	Hungary	2–1
2022	F	Qualifying round	4–5 Mar 2022	Hard	Sydney (AUS) (Note: Ken Rosewall Arena)	Hungary	3–2
2022	F	Finals, Group C	13 Sep 2022	Hard (i)	Hamburg (GER) (Note: Am Rothenbaum)	Belgium	3–0
2022	F	Finals, Group C	15 Sep 2022	Hard (i)	Hamburg (GER)	France	2–1
2022	F	Finals, Group C	18 Sep 2022	Hard (i)	Hamburg (GER)	Germany	1–2
2022	F	Finals, Quarterfinals	22 Nov 2022	Hard (i)	Málaga (ESP) (Note: Palacio de Deportes José María Martín Carpena)	Netherlands	2–0
2022	F	Finals, Semifinals	25 Nov 2022	Hard (i)	Málaga (ESP)	Croatia	2–1
2022	F	Finals, Final	27 Nov 2022	Hard (i)	Málaga (ESP)	Canada	0–2

== Australia at World Team Cup ==
Year	Result	Round	Venue	Date	Opponent	Score
1990	DNQ					
1991	DNQ					
1992	DNQ					
1993	DNQ					
1994	RR	Group B (4th)	Düsseldorf, Germany (clay)	16–22 May	Spain	1–2
1994	RR	Group B (4th)	Düsseldorf, Germany (clay)	16–22 May	Sweden	0–3
1994	RR	Group B (4th)	Düsseldorf, Germany (clay)	16–22 May	Czech Republic	1–2
1995	RR	Group B (2nd)	Düsseldorf, Germany (clay)	22–28 May	Sweden	0–3
1995	RR	Group B (2nd)	Düsseldorf, Germany (clay)	22–28 May	Germany	2–1
1995	RR	Group B (2nd)	Düsseldorf, Germany (clay)	22–28 May	United States	3–0
1996	DNQ					
1997	F	Group A (1st)	Düsseldorf, Germany (clay)	19–25 May	United States	2–1
1997	F	Group A (1st)	Düsseldorf, Germany (clay)	19–25 May	Czech Republic	2–1
1997	F	Group A (1st)	Düsseldorf, Germany (clay)	19–25 May	Croatia	3–0
1997	F	Final	Düsseldorf, Germany (clay)	25 May	Spain	0–3
1998	RR	Group A (2nd)	Düsseldorf, Germany (clay)	18–24 May	Czech Republic	1–2
1998	RR	Group A (2nd)	Düsseldorf, Germany (clay)	18–24 May	United States	2–1
1998	RR	Group A (2nd)	Düsseldorf, Germany (clay)	18–24 May	Sweden	2–1
1999	W	Group B (1st)	Düsseldorf, Germany (clay)	16–22 May	Slovakia	2–1
1999	W	Group B (1st)	Düsseldorf, Germany (clay)	16–22 May	France	3–0
1999	W	Group B (1st)	Düsseldorf, Germany (clay)	16–22 May	United States	2–1
1999	W	Final	Düsseldorf, Germany (clay)	22 May	Sweden	2–1
2000	RR	Group B (2nd)	Düsseldorf, Germany (clay)	21–27 May	Russia	0–3
2000	RR	Group B (2nd)	Düsseldorf, Germany (clay)	21–27 May	Spain	2–1
2000	RR	Group B (2nd)	Düsseldorf, Germany (clay)	21–27 May	Chile	3–0
2001	W	Group B (1st)	Düsseldorf, Germany (clay)	20–26 May	Spain	2–1
2001	W	Group B (1st)	Düsseldorf, Germany (clay)	20–26 May	Sweden	3–0
2001	W	Group B (1st)	Düsseldorf, Germany (clay)	20–26 May	Germany	1–2
2001	W	Final	Düsseldorf, Germany (clay)	26 May	Russia	2–1
2002	DNQ					
2003	RR	Group A (2nd)	Düsseldorf, Germany (clay)	18 May	Czech Republic	1–2
2003	RR	Group A (2nd)	Düsseldorf, Germany (clay)	20 May	United States	3–0
2003	RR	Group A (2nd)	Düsseldorf, Germany (clay)	22 May	Spain	1–2
2004	F	Group B (1st)	Düsseldorf, Germany (clay)	17 May	United States	2–1
2004	F	Group B (1st)	Düsseldorf, Germany (clay)	19 May	Netherlands	3–0
2004	F	Group B (1st)	Düsseldorf, Germany (clay)	21 May	Argentina	2–1
2004	F	Final	Düsseldorf, Germany (clay)	22 May	Chile	1–2
2005	DNQ					
2006	DNQ					
2007	DNQ					
2008	DNQ					
2009	DNQ					
2010	RR	Red Group (4th)	Düsseldorf, Germany (clay)	16–17 May	United States	1–2
2010	RR	Red Group (4th)	Düsseldorf, Germany (clay)	18–19 May	Czech Republic	1–2
2010	RR	Red Group (4th)	Düsseldorf, Germany (clay)	20–21 May	Spain	1–2
2011	DNQ					
2012	DNQ					

== Australia at ATP Cup ==
Year	Result	Round	Venue	Date	Opponent	Score
2020	SF	Group F (1st)	Pat Rafter Arena, Brisbane	3 Jan	Germany	3–0
2020	SF	Group F (1st)	Pat Rafter Arena, Brisbane	5 Jan	Canada	3–0
2020	SF	Group F (1st)	Pat Rafter Arena, Brisbane	7 Jan	Greece	3–0
2020	SF	Quarterfinals	Ken Rosewall Arena, Sydney	9 Jan	Great Britain	2–1
2020	SF	Semifinals	Ken Rosewall Arena, Sydney	11 Jan	Spain	0–3
2021	RR	Group B (3rd)	Melbourne Park, Melbourne	2 Feb	Spain	0–3
2021	RR	Group B (3rd)	Melbourne Park, Melbourne	3 Feb	Greece	2–1
2022	RR	Group B (2nd)	Ken Rosewall Arena, Sydney	2 Jan	Italy	2–1
2022	RR	Group B (2nd)	Sydney SuperDome, Sydney	4 Jan	Russia	0–3
2022	RR	Group B (2nd)	Ken Rosewall Arena, Sydney	6 Jan	France	2–1
