= 1923 International Lawn Tennis Challenge Europe Zone =

International tennis competition

The Europe Zone was one of the two regional zones of the 1923 International Lawn Tennis Challenge.

For the first time, the competition would be split into two zones: the America Zone and the Europe Zone. This change was necessitated by having more than 16 teams compete for the cup (thus not fitting into one easily workable draw). The past several years had also seen a rise in the number of defaults, as teams from around the globe tried to work out the logistics of playing such an international tournament. Regional zones would help alleviate these problems.

13 teams entered the Europe Zone, with the winner going on to compete in the Inter-Zonal Final against the winner of the America Zone. France defeated Spain in the final, and went on to face Australia in the Inter-Zonal Final.

== Draw ==
First round 15 May–4 June
Netherlands
bye
Italy
bye
Brussels, Belgium (clay)
Great Britain	3
Belgium	2
Spain	w/o
Romania
Bordeaux, France (clay)
France	4
Denmark	1
Dublin, Ireland (grass)
Ireland	3
India	2
Territet, Switzerland
Switzerland	3
Czechoslovakia	2
bye
Argentina

Quarterfinals; 1–23 June
Noordwijk, Netherlands (clay)
Netherlands	5
Italy	0
Manchester, England (grass)
Great Britain	2
Spain	3
Dublin, Ireland (grass)
France	4
Ireland	1
Geneva, Switzerland
Switzerland	4
Argentina	1

Semifinals; 9–15 July
Eastbourne, England (grass)
Netherlands	0
Spain	5
Lyon, France (clay)
France	3
Switzerland	2

Final; 28 July–1 August
Deauville, France (clay)
Spain	2
France	3

== First round ==
=== Belgium vs. Great Britain ===
Belgium
2
Brussels, Belgium
30 May–1 June 1923
Clay

Great Britain
3

			1	2	3	4	5
1	(Belgium) (United Kingdom)	Georges Watson; Randolph Lycett	2; 6	6; 8	2; 6
2	(Belgium) (United Kingdom)	Jean Washer; Brian Gilbert	6; 2	4; 6	6; 2	6; 3
3	(Belgium) (United Kingdom)	Jean Washer / Georges Watson; Leslie Godfree / Randolph Lycett	1; 6	4; 6	1; 6
4	(Belgium) (United Kingdom)	Jean Washer; Randolph Lycett	6; 1	6; 3	6; 4
5	(Belgium) (United Kingdom)	Georges Watson; Brian Gilbert	1; 6	4; 6	1; 6

=== France vs. Denmark ===
France
4
Villa Primrose Athletic Society, Bordeaux, France
15–17 May 1923
Clay

Denmark
1

			1	2	3	4	5
1	(France) (Denmark)	Henri Cochet; Erik Tegner	6; 1	6; 4	1; 6	5; 7	6; 4
2	(France) (Denmark)	René Lacoste; Henning Larsen	4; 6	4; 6	6; 2	8; 6	6; 8
3	(France) (Denmark)	Henri Cochet / Jean-Pierre Samazeuilh; Erik Tegner / Erik Worm	6; 1	7; 5	6; 3
4	(France) (Denmark)	Henri Cochet; Erik Worm	6; 3	8; 6	6; 1
5	(France) (Denmark)	Jean-Pierre Samazeuilh; Erik Tegner	5; 7	6; 1	1; 6	8; 6	6; 4

=== Ireland vs. India ===
Ireland
3
Fitzwilliam Lawn Tennis Club, Dublin, Ireland
1–4 June 1923
Grass

India
2

			1	2	3	4	5
1	(Republic of Ireland) (India)	Cecil Campbell; Sydney Jacob	2; 6	2; 6	3; 6
2	(Republic of Ireland) (India)	D'Arcy McCrea; Hassan Ali Fyzee	7; 5	9; 7	2; 6	6; 3
3	(Republic of Ireland) (India)	Louis Meldon / Simon Scroope; Lewis Deane / Hassan Ali Fyzee	6; 0	3; 6	6; 8	6; 4	6; 8
4	(Republic of Ireland) (India)	Cecil Campbell; Hassan Ali Fyzee	6; 4	7; 5	6; 2
5	(Republic of Ireland) (India)	D'Arcy McCrea; Sydney Jacob	6; 4	6; 2	6; 4

=== Switzerland vs. Czechoslovakia ===
Switzerland
3
Montreux Lawn Tennis Club, Territet, Switzerland
31 May–2 June 1923

Czechoslovakia
2

			1	2	3	4	5
1	(Switzerland) (Czechoslovakia)	Charles Aeschlimann; Ladislav Žemla	7; 5	6; 2	8; 10	6; 3
2	(Switzerland) (Czechoslovakia)	Charles Martin; Friedrich Rohrer	2; 6	6; 3	6; 3	6; 8	6; 2
3	(Switzerland) (Czechoslovakia)	Maurice Ferrier / Guy Sautter; Friedrich Rohrer / Ladislav Žemla	6; 4	4; 6	5; 7	6; 8
4	(Switzerland) (Czechoslovakia)	Charles Aeschlimann; Friedrich Rohrer	4; 6	7; 5	13; 11	3; 6	6; 0
5	(Switzerland) (Czechoslovakia)	Charles Martin; Ladislav Žemla	4; 6	6; 3	3; 6	4; 6

== Quarterfinals ==
=== Netherlands vs. Italy ===
Netherlands
5
Noordwijk, Netherlands
1–3 June 1923
Clay

Italy
0

			1	2	3	4	5
1	(Netherlands) (Italy)	Christiaan van Lennep; Uberto De Morpurgo	6; 1	0; 6	6; 3	6; 2
2	(Netherlands) (Italy)	Arthur Diemer-Kool; Cesare Colombo	6; 2	6; 1	5; 7	6; 4
3	(Netherlands) (Italy)	Arthur Diemer-Kool / Christiaan van Lennep; Mino Balbi Di Robecco / Uberto De Morpurgo	6; 4	6; 4	6; 3
4	(Netherlands) (Italy)	Christiaan van Lennep; Cesare Colombo	6; 2	3; 6	6; 2	6; 3
5	(Netherlands) (Italy)	Arthur Diemer-Kool; Uberto De Morpurgo	7; 5	5; 7	3; 6	6; 4	6; 4

=== Great Britain vs. Spain ===
Great Britain
2
Northern Lawn Tennis Club, Manchester, England
16–19 June 1923
Grass

Spain
3

			1	2	3	4	5
1	(United Kingdom) (Spain)	Randolph Lycett; Eduardo Flaquer	6; 0	6; 1	6; 1
2	(United Kingdom) (Spain)	Patrick Wheatley; Manuel de Gomar	6; 4	8; 10	1; 6	2; 6
3	(United Kingdom) (Spain)	Leslie Godfree / Randolph Lycett; Eduardo Flaquer / Manuel de Gomar	2; 6	3; 6	6; 4	3; 6
4	(United Kingdom) (Spain)	Patrick Wheatley; Eduardo Flaquer	0; 6	4; 6	6; 3	6; 1	11; 9
5	(United Kingdom) (Spain)	Randolph Lycett; Manuel de Gomar	4; 6	1; 6	5; 7

=== Ireland vs. France ===
Ireland
1
Fitzwilliam Lawn Tennis Club, Dublin, Ireland
21–23 June 1923
Grass

France
4

			1	2	3	4	5
1	(Republic of Ireland) (France)	D'Arcy McCrea; Henri Cochet	1; 6	3; 6	11; 13
2	(Republic of Ireland) (France)	Cecil Campbell; Jean Borotra	6; 1	7; 5	6; 0
3	(Republic of Ireland) (France)	Cecil Campbell / Simon Scroope; Jacques Brugnon / René Lacoste	2; 6	3; 6	12; 14
4	(Republic of Ireland) (France)	Cecil Campbell; Henri Cochet	6; 0	5; 7	6; 4	8; 10	6; 8
5	(Republic of Ireland) (France)	D'Arcy McCrea; Jean Borotra	5; 7	6; 1	7; 5	0; 6	2; 6

=== Switzerland vs. Argentina ===
Switzerland
4
Geneva, Switzerland
15–17 June 1923

Argentina
1

			1	2	3	4	5
1	(Switzerland) (Argentina)	Charles Martin; Carlos Caminos	8; 6	6; 4	6; 3
2	(Switzerland) (Argentina)	Charles Aeschlimann; Ronaldo Boyd	8; 6	4; 6	6; 4	6; 4
3	(Switzerland) (Argentina)	Charles Aeschlimann / Guy Sautter; Guillermo Robson / Alfredo Villegas	4; 6	6; 3	9; 7	6; 3
4	(Switzerland) (Argentina)	Charles Martin; Ronaldo Boyd	3; 6	1; 6	9; 7	6; 4	5; 7
5	(Switzerland) (Argentina)	Charles Aeschlimann; Carlos Caminos	6; 3	7; 5	6; 3

== Semifinals ==
=== Spain vs. Netherlands ===
Spain
5
Devonshire Park Lawn Tennis Club, Eastbourne, England
9–11 July 1923
Grass

Netherlands
0

			1	2	3	4	5
1	(Spain) (Netherlands)	Manuel de Gomar; Christiaan van Lennep	6; 4	6; 3	6; 3
2	(Spain) (Netherlands)	Eduardo Flaquer; Marinus van der Feen	4; 6	6; 2	6; 3	6; 0
3	(Spain) (Netherlands)	Eduardo Flaquer / Manuel de Gomar; Cornelis Bryan / Hendrik Timmer	6; 4	6; 3	6; 2
4	(Spain) (Netherlands)	Manuel de Gomar; Marinus van der Feen	6; 3	6; 0	7; 5
5	(Spain) (Netherlands)	Eduardo Flaquer; Christiaan van Lennep	5; 7	6; 3	8; 6	6; 1

=== France vs. Switzerland ===
France
3
Lyon Tennis Club, Lyon, France
13–15 July 1923
Clay

Switzerland
2

			1	2	3	4	5
1	(France) (Switzerland)	Jean-François Blanchy; Charles Aeschlimann	6; 4	6; 2	6; 4
2	(France) (Switzerland)	Henri Cochet; Charles Martin	6; 4	4; 6	6; 3	1; 6	3; 6
3	(France) (Switzerland)	Jean-François Blanchy / Jean-Pierre Samazeuilh; Charles Aeschlimann / Guy Sautter	10; 8	6; 3	2; 6	4; 6	4; 6
4	(France) (Switzerland)	Jean-François Blanchy; Charles Martin	7; 5	6; 3	6; 2
5	(France) (Switzerland)	Henri Cochet; Charles Aeschlimann	1; 6	6; 3	6; 3	5; 7	6; 4

== Final ==
=== France vs. Spain ===
France
3
Sporting Club, Deauville, France
28 July – 1 August 1923
Clay

Spain
2

			1	2	3	4	5
1	(France) (Spain)	René Lacoste; Manuel de Gomar	6; 3	6; 4	5; 7	6; 4
2	(France) (Spain)	Jean-François Blanchy; Eduardo Flaquer	6; 1	6; 2	3; 6	6; 1
3	(France) (Spain)	Jacques Brugnon / Henri Cochet; Eduardo Flaquer / Manuel de Gomar	4; 6	6; 8	13; 11	6; 1	4; 6
4	(France) (Spain)	René Lacoste; Eduardo Flaquer	6; 1	6; 3	6; 2
5	(France) (Spain)	Jean-François Blanchy; Manuel de Gomar	3; 6	6; 2	2; 6	2; 6
