= 1950 Davis Cup =

1950 edition of the Davis Cup

Details
- Duration: 7 April – 27 August 1950
- Edition: 39th
- Teams: 25

Champion
- Winning nation: Australia

The 1950 Davis Cup was the 39th edition of the most important tournament between national teams in men's tennis. 22 teams entered the Europe Zone, and 4 teams entered the America Zone. Play took place on Asian soil for the first time, when the Philippines hosted Pakistan in Manila for their first-round Europe Zone tie.

Australia defeated Mexico in the America Zone final, and Sweden defeated Denmark in the Europe Zone final. Australia defeated Sweden in the Inter-Zonal play-off, and then defeated defending champions the United States in the Challenge Round. The final was played at the West Side Tennis Club in Forest Hills, New York, United States on 25–27 August.

== America Zone ==
=== Draw ===
Semifinals; 7–16 July
Montreal, Canada (grass)
Australia	5
Canada	0
Havana, Cuba
Cuba	0
Mexico	5

Final; 28–30 July
Mexico City, Mexico (clay)
Australia	4
Mexico	1

=== Final ===
Mexico
1
Centro Deportivo Chapultepec, Mexico City, Mexico
28–30 July 1950
Clay

Australia
4

			1	2	3	4	5
1	(Mexico) (Australia)	Armando Vega; Frank Sedgman	6; 2	4; 6	2; 6	6; 4	2; 6
2	(Mexico) (Australia)	Gustavo Palafox; Ken McGregor	6; 4	6; 4	6; 8	3; 6	6; 3
3	(Mexico) (Australia)	Gustavo Palafox / Armando Vega; John Bromwich / Frank Sedgman	4; 6	5; 7	2; 6
4	(Mexico) (Australia)	Gustavo Palafox; Frank Sedgman	4; 6	4; 6	2; 6
5	(Mexico) (Australia)	Armando Vega; John Bromwich	6; 3	0; 6	2; 6	2; 6

== Europe Zone ==
=== Draw ===
First Round; 7 April–9 May
Poland
bye
Israel
bye
Ireland
bye
Monaco
bye
Peru
bye
Philippines	5
Pakistan	0
Norway	w/o
Hungary
Netherlands	1
Sweden	4
Belgium	4
Finland	1
Yugoslavia	5
Austria	0
Great Britain	2
Italy	3
bye
Luxembourg
bye
Denmark
bye
Egypt
bye
France
bye
Switzerland

Second Round; 18–22 May
Warsaw, Poland
Poland	5
Israel	0
Dublin, Ireland (grass)
Ireland	5
Monaco	0
Peru
Philippines	w/o
Oslo, Norway (clay)
Norway	0
Sweden	5
Zagreb, Yugoslavia
Belgium	3
Yugoslavia	2
Mondorf-les-Bains, Luxembourg
Italy	5
Luxembourg	0
Copenhagen, Denmark (clay)
Denmark	3
Egypt	0
Paris, France (clay)
France	4
Switzerland	0

Quarterfinals; 8–18 June
Warsaw, Poland
Poland	3
Ireland	2
Solna, Sweden (clay)
Philippines	0
Sweden	5
Brussels, Belgium
Belgium	2
Italy	3
Copenhagen, Denmark (clay)
Denmark	3
France	2

Semifinals; 13–16 July
Båstad, Sweden (clay)
Poland	0
Sweden	5
Copenhagen, Denmark (clay)
Italy	1
Denmark	4

Final; 28–30 July
Båstad, Sweden (clay)
Sweden	4
Denmark	0

=== Final ===
Sweden vs. Denmark

Sweden
4
Båstad Tennis Stadium, Båstad, Sweden
28–30 July 1950
Clay

Denmark
0

			1	2	3	4	5
1	(Sweden) (Denmark)	Torsten Johansson; Torben Ulrich	6; 1	4; 6	6; 3	6; 1
2	(Sweden) (Denmark)	Sven Davidson; Kurt Nielsen	7; 5	3; 6	6; 2	6; 4
3	(Sweden) (Denmark)	Lennart Bergelin / Sven Davidson; Kurt Nielsen / Torben Ulrich	6; 2	6; 2	6; 2
4	(Sweden) (Denmark)	Torsten Johansson; Kurt Nielsen	3; 6	7; 5	6; 0	4; 6	6; 2
5	(Sweden) (Denmark)	Lennart Bergelin; Torben Ulrich	6; 0	6; 2				not completed

== Inter-Zonal Final ==
Australia vs. Sweden

Australia
3
Westchester Country Club, Rye, NY, United States
11–13 August 1950
Grass

Sweden
2

			1	2	3	4	5
1	(Australia) (Sweden)	Frank Sedgman; Lennart Bergelin	6; 2	2; 6	5; 7	6; 1	3; 6
2	(Australia) (Sweden)	John Bromwich; Torsten Johansson	6; 2	6; 3	6; 0
3	(Australia) (Sweden)	John Bromwich / Frank Sedgman; Lennart Bergelin / Sven Davidson	6; 1	7; 5	7; 5
4	(Australia) (Sweden)	John Bromwich; Lennart Bergelin	3; 6	2; 6	6; 1	9; 7	3; 6
5	(Australia) (Sweden)	Frank Sedgman; Torsten Johansson	6; 4	7; 5	6; 3

== Challenge Round ==
United States vs. Australia

United States
1
West Side Tennis Club, Forest Hills, NY, United States
25–27 August 1950
Grass

Australia
4

			1	2	3	4	5
1	(United States) (Australia)	Tom Brown; Frank Sedgman	0; 6	6; 8	7; 9
2	(United States) (Australia)	Ted Schroeder; Ken McGregor	11; 13	3; 6	4; 6
3	(United States) (Australia)	Gardnar Mulloy / Ted Schroeder; John Bromwich / Frank Sedgman	6; 4	4; 6	2; 6	6; 4	4; 6
4	(United States) (Australia)	Ted Schroeder; Frank Sedgman	2; 6	2; 6	2; 6
5	(United States) (Australia)	Tom Brown; Ken McGregor	9; 11	8; 10	11; 9	6; 1	6; 4
