= Simon Scroope =

Irish tennis player (1876–1958)

- Country (sports): (Republic of Ireland) Ireland
- Born: 10 January 1876 Gort, County Galway, Ireland
- Died: 20 December 1958 (aged 82) Sandymount, Dublin, Ireland

Doubles
- Career record: 1–2 (Davis Cup)
- Davis Cup: QF (1923 Europe Zone)

Simon Frederick Scroope (10 January 1876 – 20 December 1958) was an Irish tennis player.

Born in Gort, County Galway, Scroope was one of 11 children of Henry Scroope, a bank manager from Yorkshire, and Catherine Hackett, the daughter of judge William Hackett. He grew up in Ballina and attended Stonyhurst College.

Scroope was described by the Evening Herald as a player whose game was marked by his "finesse and placing power". He twice won the County Dublin singles title and was a singles runner–up at the Irish Championships. Representing Ireland in the Davis Cup, Scroope participated in their 1923 win over India, then in 1925 partnered with his brother Charles in a doubles tie against Austria in Vienna, for which he was team captain. The tie against Austria was played in front of a hostile home crowd and Scroope was said to have come close to abandoning the fixture over what he perceived as one–sided officiating. He later served as a Davis Cup referee.

A banker by profession, Scroope spent his entire working life with the National Bank of Ireland, serving as manager of branches in Dun Laoghaire and Rathmines, before retiring in 1940 as co–manager of the branch in College Green, Dublin.

== See also ==
- List of Ireland Davis Cup team representatives
