= 1935 International Lawn Tennis Challenge America Zone =

Tennis tournament

The America Zone was one of the two regional zones of the 1935 International Lawn Tennis Challenge.

6 teams entered the America Zone: 4 teams competed in the North & Central America Zone, while 2 teams competed in the South America Zone. The winner of each sub-zone would play against each other to determine who moved to the Inter-Zonal Final to compete against the winner of the Europe Zone.

The United States defeated Mexico in the North & Central America Zone final, and Brazil defeated Uruguay in the South America Zone final. In the Americas Inter-Zonal Final, the United States received a walkover after Brazil withdrew, and went on to face Germany in the Inter-Zonal Final.

== North & Central America Zone ==
=== Draw ===
Semifinals; 3–12 May
Mexico City, Mexico (clay)
Mexico | 5
Cuba | 0
Mexico City, Mexico (clay)
China | 0
United States | 5

Final; 17–19 May
Mexico City, Mexico (clay)
Mexico | 0
United States | 5

=== Semifinals ===
==== Mexico vs. Cuba ====
Mexico
5
Club Deportivo Chapultepec, Mexico City, Mexico
3–5 May 1935
Clay

Cuba
0

| | | | 1 | 2 | 3 | 4 | 5 |
|---|---|---|---|---|---|---|---|
| 1 | (Mexico) (Cuba) | Esteban Reyes; Arturo Randin | 6; 2 | 6; 0 | 6; 3 |
| 2 | (Mexico) (Cuba) | Daniel Hernández; Lorenzo Nodarse | 5; 7 | 6; 3 | 4; 6 | 8; 6 | 6; 2 |
| 3 | (Mexico) (Cuba) | José Llano / Alfonso Unda; José Agüero / Arturo Randin | 6; 4 | 6; 1 | 6; 3 |
| 4 | (Mexico) (Cuba) | Daniel Hernández; José Agüero | 6; 3 | 7; 5 | 3; 6 | 7; 5 |
| 5 | (Mexico) (Cuba) | Esteban Reyes; Joffre Etcheverry | 8; 6 | 6; 1 | 6; 3 |

==== United States vs. China ====
United States
5
Club Deportivo Chapultepec, Mexico City, Mexico
10–12 May 1935
Clay

China
0

| | | | 1 | 2 | 3 | 4 | 5 |
|---|---|---|---|---|---|---|---|
| 1 | (United States) (Taiwan) | Bryan Grant; Guy Cheng | 4; 6 | 6; 3 | 6; 2 | 6; 2 |
| 2 | (United States) (Taiwan) | Don Budge; Kho Sin-Kie | 6; 2 | 6; 1 | 6; 8 | 6; 2 |
| 3 | (United States) (Taiwan) | Don Budge / Gene Mako; Guy Cheng / Kho Sin-Kie | 7; 5 | 6; 2 | 6; 1 |
| 4 | (United States) (Taiwan) | Don Budge; Guy Cheng | 6; 4 | 6; 2 | 6; 1 |
| 5 | (United States) (Taiwan) | Bryan Grant; Kho Sin-Kie | 6; 1 | 6; 4 | 6; 3 |

=== Final ===
==== Mexico vs. United States ====
Mexico
1
Club Deportivo Chapultepec, Mexico City, Mexico
17–19 May 1935
Clay

United States
4

| | | | 1 | 2 | 3 | 4 | 5 |
|---|---|---|---|---|---|---|---|---|
| 1 | (Mexico) (United States) | Esteban Reyes; Bryan Grant | 2; 6 | 3; 6 | 3; 6 |
| 2 | (Mexico) (United States) | Daniel Hernández; Don Budge | 4; 6 | 3; 6 | 4; 6 |
| 3 | (Mexico) (United States) | José Llano / Alfonso Unda; Don Budge / Gene Mako | 0; 6 | 2; 6 | 3; 6 |
| 4 | (Mexico) (United States) | Daniel Hernández; Bryan Grant | 1; 6 | 3; 6 | 0; 6 |
| 5 | (Mexico) (United States) | Esteban Reyes; Gene Mako | 1; 6 | 6; 3 | 8; 6 | 4; 6 | 0; 2 | retired |

== South America Zone ==
=== Draw ===
Final; 26–28 April
Montevideo, Uruguay
Brazil | 3
Uruguay | 2

=== Final ===
==== Uruguay vs. Brazil ====
Uruguay
2
Montevideo, Uruguay
26–28 April 1935

Brazil
3

| | | | 1 | 2 | 3 | 4 | 5 |
|---|---|---|---|---|---|---|---|
| 1 | (Uruguay) (Brazil) | Sebastian Harreguy; Silvio Campos | 6; 4 | 5; 7 | 6; 3 | 4; 6 | 1; 6 |
| 2 | (Uruguay) (Brazil) | Carlos Ponce de León; Ultimo Simone | 6; 2 | 6; 2 | 6; 8 | 6; 1 |
| 3 | (Uruguay) (Brazil) | Ricardo Cat / Eduardo Stanham; Enrique de Freitas / Ultimo Simone | 5; 7 | 6; 4 | 1; 6 | 6; 8 |
| 4 | (Uruguay) (Brazil) | Carlos Ponce de León; Silvio Campos | 6; 4 | 6; 0 | 6; 4 |
| 5 | (Uruguay) (Brazil) | Sebastian Harreguy; Ultimo Simone | 5; 7 | 4; 6 | 4; 6 |

== Americas Inter-Zonal Final ==
=== United States vs. Brazil ===
United States defeated Brazil by walkover.
