= 1925 International Lawn Tennis Challenge =

1925 edition of the International Lawn Tennis Challenge

Details
- Duration: 8 May – 13 September 1925
- Edition: 20th
- Teams: 23

Champion
- Winning nation: United States

The 1925 International Lawn Tennis Challenge was the 20th edition of what is now known as the Davis Cup. Sixteen teams would enter the Europe Zone, while 9 would enter the America Zone. Portugal, Poland and Sweden competed for the first time.

France defeated Australia in the Inter-Zonal play-off, but would fall to the United States in the Challenge Round. The final was played at the Germantown Cricket Club in Philadelphia, Pennsylvania, United States on 11–13 September.

== America Zone ==
=== Draw ===
First Round; 4–6 July
Havana, Cuba (clay)
Spain	5
Cuba	0

Quarterfinals
Canada	w/o
New Zealand
Hawaii
Australia	w/o
Mexico	0
Spain	5
China
Japan	w/o

Semifinals
Canada	0
Australia	5
Spain	2
Japan	3

Finals
Australia	4
Japan	1

=== Final ===
Australia vs. Japan

Australia
4
Longwood Cricket Club, Boston, MA, United States
20–22 August 1925
Grass

Japan
1

			1	2	3	4	5
1	(Australia) (Japan)	Gerald Patterson; Zenzo Shimizu	6; 1	6; 4	6; 2
2	(Australia) (Japan)	James Anderson; Takeichi Harada	6; 4	3; 6	6; 3	6; 1
3	(Australia) (Japan)	John Hawkes / Gerald Patterson; Takeichi Harada / Zenzo Shimizu	6; 1	6; 2	9; 7
4	(Australia) (Japan)	Gerald Patterson; Takeichi Harada	2; 6	6; 3	1; 6	5; 7
5	(Australia) (Japan)	John Hawkes; Masanosuke Fukuda	6; 1	6; 3	6; 0

== Europe Zone ==
=== Draw ===
First round 8–19 May
Budapest, Hungary (clay)
France	4
Hungary	1
Lisbon, Portugal (clay)
Portugal	1
Italy	4
London, England (clay)
Romania	1
Denmark	4
Warsaw, Poland (clay)
Poland	0
Great Britain	5
Vienna, Austria
Austria	4
Ireland	1
Brussels, Belgium
Belgium	2
India	3
Bern, Switzerland
Sweden	3
Switzerland	2
Noordwijk, Netherlands (clay)
Netherlands	3
Czechoslovakia	2

Quarterfinals; 27 May–14 June
Paris, France (clay)
France	5
Italy	0
Copenhagen, Denmark (clay)
Denmark	0
Great Britain	3
Vienna, Austria
Austria	0
India	4
Noordwijk, Netherlands (clay)
Sweden	0
Netherlands	5

Semifinals; 10–14 July
Eastbourne, England (grass)
France	4
Great Britain	0
Noordwijk, Netherlands (clay)
India	1
Netherlands	4

Final; 18–20 July
Noordwijk, Netherlands (clay)
France	4
Netherlands	0

=== Final ===
Netherlands vs. France

Netherlands
0
Noordwijk Club, Noordwijk, Netherlands (clay)
18–20 July 1925
Clay

France
4

			1	2	3	4	5
1	(Netherlands) (France)	Hendrik Timmer; René Lacoste	7; 5	5; 7	2; 6	2; 6
2	(Netherlands) (France)	Arthur Diemer Kool; Jean Borotra	2; 6	4; 6	8; 10
3	(Netherlands) (France)	Arthur Diemer Kool / Christiaan van Lennep; Jacques Brugnon / René Lacoste	2; 6	3; 6	8; 6	4; 6
4	(Netherlands) (France)	Arthur Diemer Kool; René Lacoste	4; 6	4; 6	1; 6
5	(Netherlands) (France)	Hendrik Timmer; Jean Borotra						not played

== Inter-Zonal Final ==
France vs. Australia

France
3
West Side Tennis Club, Forest Hills, NY, United States
4–5 September 1925
Grass

Australia
1

			1	2	3	4	5
1	(France) (Australia)	René Lacoste; Gerald Patterson	3; 6	4; 6	2; 6
2	(France) (Australia)	Jean Borotra; James Anderson	6; 4	6; 3	8; 6
3	(France) (Australia)	Jean Borotra / René Lacoste; John Hawkes / Gerald Patterson	6; 4	3; 6	6; 4	1; 6	10; 8
4	(France) (Australia)	Jean Borotra; Gerald Patterson	4; 6	6; 4	6; 1	6; 3
5	(France) (Australia)	René Lacoste; James Anderson						not played

== Challenge Round ==
United States vs. France

United States
5
Germantown Cricket Club, Philadelphia, PA, United States
11–13 September 1925
Grass

France
0

			1	2	3	4	5
1	(United States) (France)	Bill Tilden; Jean Borotra	4; 6	6; 0	2; 6	9; 7	6; 4
2	(United States) (France)	Bill Johnston; René Lacoste	6; 1	6; 1	6; 8	6; 3
3	(United States) (France)	Vincent Richards / Richard Norris Williams; Jean Borotra / René Lacoste	6; 4	6; 4	6; 3
4	(United States) (France)	Bill Tilden; René Lacoste	3; 6	10; 12	8; 6	7; 5	6; 2
5	(United States) (France)	Bill Johnston; Jean Borotra	6; 1	6; 4	6; 0

== See also ==
- 1925 Wightman Cup
