= 1923 Wightman Cup =

Annual women's team tennis competition

Details
- Duration: 11 – 13 August 1923
- Edition: 1st

Champion
- Winning nation: United States

The 1923 Wightman Cup, named after the founder Hazel Hotchkiss Wightman, was the first edition of the Wightman Cup, the annual women's team tennis competition between the United States and Great Britain. It was held at the West Side Tennis Club in Forest Hills, Queens in New York City in New York in the United States.

The competition was scheduled to start on Friday, 10 August but was postponed until Saturday in observance of a day of mourning for U.S. President Warren G. Harding. As there was no play on Sunday the event was concluded on Monday, 13 August. The inaugural competition was played as the opening match of the newly constructed tennis stadium at the West Side Tennis Club. The United States team won the inaugural cup by winning all seven matches.

== Result ==
United States
7
West Side Tennis Club, Forest Hills, NY, United States
11 and 13 August 1923
Grass

Great Britain
0

			1	2	3
1	(United States) (United Kingdom)	Helen Wills; Kathleen McKane	6; 2	7; 5
2	(United States) (United Kingdom)	Molla Mallory; Mabel Clayton	6; 1	8; 6
3	(United States) (United Kingdom)	Eleanor Goss; Geraldine Beamish	6; 2	7; 5
4	(United States) (United Kingdom)	Helen Wills; Mabel Clayton	6; 2	6; 1
5	(United States) (United Kingdom)	Molla Mallory; Kathleen McKane	6; 2	6; 3
6	(United States) (United Kingdom)	Hazel Hotchkiss Wightman / Eleanor Goss; Kathleen McKane / Phyllis Covell	10; 8	5; 7	6; 4
7	(United States) (United Kingdom)	Molla Mallory / Helen Wills; Geraldine Beamish / Mabel Clayton	6; 2	6; 2

== See also ==
- 1923 Davis Cup
