= 1923 International Lawn Tennis Challenge America Zone =

International tennis competition

The America Zone was one of the two regional zones of the 1923 International Lawn Tennis Challenge.

For the first time, the competition would be split into two zones: the America Zone and the Europe Zone. This change was necessitated by having more than 16 teams compete for the cup (thus not fitting into one easily workable draw). The past several years had also seen a rise in the number of defaults, as teams from around the globe tried to work out the logistics of playing such an international tournament. Regional zones would help alleviate these problems.

4 teams entered the America Zone, with the winner going on to compete in the Inter-Zonal Final against the winner of the Europe Zone. Australia defeated Japan in the final, and went on to face France in the Inter-Zonal Final.

== Draw ==
Semifinals; 26–28 July
Orange, NJ, United States (grass)
Australia	4
Hawaii	1
Montreal, Canada (grass)
Canada	0
Japan	5

Final; 9–12 August
Chicago, IL, United States (grass)
Australia	4
Japan	1

== Semifinals ==
=== Hawaii vs. Australia ===
Hawaii
1
Orange Lawn Tennis Club, Orange, NJ, United States
26–28 July 1923
Grass

Australia
4

			1	2	3	4	5
1	(Hawaii) (Australia)	Bowie Detrick; James Anderson	1; 6	3; 6	3; 6
2	(Hawaii) (Australia)	William Eklund; John Hawkes	2; 6	1; 6	4; 6
3	(Hawaii) (Australia)	Bowie Detrick / William Eklund; James Anderson / John Hawkes	0; 6	6; 8	5; 7
4	(Hawaii) (Australia)	Bowie Detrick; John Hawkes	3; 6	1; 6	1; 6
5	(Hawaii) (Australia)	William Eklund; Richard Schlesinger	6; 4	4; 6	6; 1	6; 4

=== Canada vs. Japan ===
Canada
0
Mount Royal Tennis Club, Montreal, Canada
26–28 July 1923
Grass

Japan
5

			1	2	3	4	5
1	(Canada) (Japan)	Willard Crocker; Zenzo Shimizu	6; 3	7; 9	1; 6	6; 8
2	(Canada) (Japan)	Leroy Rennie; Masanosuke Fukuda	2; 6	0; 6	0; 6
3	(Canada) (Japan)	Willard Crocker / Jack Wright; Seiichiro Kashio / Zenzo Shimizu	1; 6	2; 6	2; 6
4	(Canada) (Japan)	Leroy Rennie; Zenzo Shimizu	2; 6	3; 6	0; 6
5	(Canada) (Japan)	Willard Crocker; Masanosuke Fukuda	2; 6	3; 6	2; 6

== Final ==
=== Australia vs. Japan ===
Australia
4
South Side Tennis Club, Chicago, IL, United States
9–12 August 1923
Grass

Japan
1

			1	2	3	4	5
1	(Australia) (Japan)	James Anderson; Zenzo Shimizu	6; 0	6; 3	6; 3
2	(Australia) (Japan)	John Hawkes; Masanosuke Fukuda	6; 3	6; 4	6; 3
3	(Australia) (Japan)	James Anderson / John Hawkes; Seiichiro Kashio / Zenzo Shimizu	6; 1	6; 2	6; 2
4	(Australia) (Japan)	John Hawkes; Zenzo Shimizu	4; 6	6; 3	6; 2	1; 6	4; 6
5	(Australia) (Japan)	James Anderson; Masanosuke Fukuda	6; 1	3; 6	6; 2	6; 1
