= 1935 International Lawn Tennis Challenge Europe Zone =

International tennis competition

Details
- Duration: 20 July 1934 – 2 September 1934 (Qualifying draw); 10 May 1935 – 14 July 1935 (Main draw)
- Teams: 11 (Main draw)
- Categories: 1935 Europe Zone; 1935 America Zone

Champion
- Winning nation: Australia; Qualified for: 1935 Inter-Zonal Final

The Europe Zone was one of the two regional zones of the 1935 International Lawn Tennis Challenge.

Due to increased political tensions in Europe, entries for the Europe Zone declined sharply, causing the Qualifying Round system to be scrapped. 11 teams entered the Europe Zone, with the winner going on to compete in the Inter-Zonal Final against the winner of the America Zone; 17 teams entering the qualifying rounds. Germany defeated Czechoslovakia in the final, and went on to face the United States in the Inter-Zonal Final.

== Qualifying round ==
=== Draw ===
First round
Warsaw, Poland
Poland	4
Belgium	1

Second round
Warsaw, Poland
Poland	5
Estonia	0
Austria
Greece	w/o
Berlin, Germany
Germany	5
Romania	0
Denmark	w/o
Switzerland
Stockholm, Sweden (clay)
Sweden	3
Ireland	2
Amsterdam, Netherlands (clay)
Monaco	1
Netherlands	4
Budapest, Hungary (clay)
Hungary	3
Norway	2
Yugoslavia	w/o
Spain

Qualifying round
Warsaw, Poland
Poland	5
Greece	0
Copenhagen, Denmark
Germany	5
Denmark	0
Stockholm, Sweden
Sweden	2
Netherlands	3
Budapest, Hungary
Hungary	2
Yugoslavia	3

=== First round ===
==== Poland vs. Belgium ====
Poland
4
Warsaw, Poland
20–22 July 1934

Belgium
1

			1	2	3	4	5
1	(Poland) (Belgium)	Józef Hebda; Charles Naeyaert	0; 6	6; 3	6; 2	8; 6
2	(Poland) (Belgium)	Ignacy Tłoczyński; André Lacroix	6; 3	6; 3	10; 8
3	(Poland) (Belgium)	Maksymilian Stolarow / Ignacy Tłoczyński; Léopold de Borman / André Lacroix	2; 6	4; 6	6; 4	2; 6
4	(Poland) (Belgium)	Ignacy Tłoczyński; Charles Naeyaert	6; 4	10; 8	8; 6
5	(Poland) (Belgium)	Józef Hebda; André Lacroix	6; 0	6; 4	6; 4

=== Second round ===
==== Poland vs. Estonia ====
Poland
5
Warsaw, Poland
3–5 August 1934

Estonia
0

			1	2	3	4	5
1	(Poland) (Estonia)	Ignacy Tłoczyński; Hugo Pukk	6; 4	6; 4	6; 3
2	(Poland) (Estonia)	Kazimierz Tarlowski; Kristian Lasn	6; 2	6; 4	2; 6	6; 4
3	(Poland) (Estonia)	Ignacy Tłoczyński / Ernest Wittmann; Kristian Lasn / Hugo Pukk	6; 3	6; 8	6; 4	1; 6	6; 4
4	(Poland) (Estonia)	Kazimierz Tarlowski; Hugo Pukk	6; 3	6; 4	6; 1
5	(Poland) (Estonia)	Ignacy Tłoczyński; Kristian Lasn	6; 3	6; 2	6; 2

==== Germany vs. Romania ====
Germany
5
Berlin, Germany
17–19 August 1934

Romania
0

			1	2	3	4	5
1	(Germany) (Romania)	Henner Henkel; Arnulf Schmidt	6; 1	6; 1	6; 0
2	(Germany) (Romania)	Gottfried von Cramm; Alexandru Hamburger	6; 1	6; 2	6; 3
3	(Germany) (Romania)	Gottfried von Cramm / Henner Henkel; Alexandru Hamburger / Arnulf Schmidt	6; 1	6; 2	6; 2
4	(Germany) (Romania)	Henner Henkel; Alexandru Hamburger	6; 2	6; 3	6; 3
5	(Germany) (Romania)	Gottfried von Cramm; Arnulf Schmidt	7; 5	6; 4	6; 1

==== Sweden vs. Ireland ====
Sweden
3
Tennisstadion, Stockholm, Sweden
15–17 August 1934
Clay

Ireland
2

			1	2	3	4	5
1	(Sweden) (Republic of Ireland)	Curt Östberg; George Lyttleton-Rogers	4; 6	6; 1	3; 6	5; 7
2	(Sweden) (Republic of Ireland)	Kalle Schröder; George McVeagh	6; 3	6; 2	6; 2
3	(Sweden) (Republic of Ireland)	Curt Östberg / Kalle Schröder; George Lyttleton-Rogers / Edward McGuire	5; 7	6; 2	6; 2	6; 3
4	(Sweden) (Republic of Ireland)	Kalle Schröder; George Lyttleton-Rogers	1; 6	4; 6	4; 6
5	(Sweden) (Republic of Ireland)	Curt Östberg; George McVeagh	6; 3	6; 3	4; 6	6; 3

==== Netherlands vs. Monaco ====
Netherlands
4
Amsterdam, Netherlands
3–5 August 1934
Clay

Monaco
1

			1	2	3	4	5
1	(Netherlands) (Monaco)	Hendrik Timmer; René Gallèpe	5; 7	6; 2	6; 3	6; 4
2	(Netherlands) (Monaco)	Josef Knottenbelt; Vladimir Landau	2; 6	6; 2	5; 7	8; 6	7; 5
3	(Netherlands) (Monaco)	Ody Koopman / Hendrik Timmer; René Gallèpe / Vladimir Landau	4; 6	3; 6	5; 7
4	(Netherlands) (Monaco)	Hendrik Timmer; Vladimir Landau	6; 4	6; 1	6; 4
5	(Netherlands) (Monaco)	Josef Knottenbelt; René Gallèpe	6; 3	4; 6	6; 1	2; 6	6; 4

==== Hungary vs. Norway ====
Hungary
3
Budapest, Hungary
3–5 August 1934
Clay

Norway
2

			1	2	3	4	5
1	(Hungary) (Norway)	Elek Straub; Finn-Trygve Smith	5; 7	5; 7	6; 1	6; 4	6; 2
2	(Hungary) (Norway)	Emil Gábori; Johan Haanes	6; 2	6; 4	9; 11	6; 3
3	(Hungary) (Norway)	Emil Ferenczy / Imre Zichy; Johan Haanes / Finn-Trygve Smith	6; 3	4; 6	6; 4	4; 6	3; 6
4	(Hungary) (Norway)	Elek Straub; Johan Haanes	2; 6	3; 6	3; 6
5	(Hungary) (Norway)	Emil Gábori; Finn-Trygve Smith	6; 3	7; 5	6; 4

=== Qualifying round ===
==== Poland vs. Greece ====
Poland
5
Warsaw, Poland
31 August–2 September 1934

Greece
0

			1	2	3	4	5
1	(Poland) (Greece)	Ignacy Tłoczyński; Kimon Zachos	6; 1	6; 0	6; 2
2	(Poland) (Greece)	Józef Hebda; Lazaros Stalios	6; 3	6; 0	7; 5
3	(Poland) (Greece)	Walenty Bratek / Kazimierz Tarlowski; Lazaros Stalios / Kimon Zachos	7; 5	6; 1	6; 1
4	(Poland) (Greece)	Kazimierz Tarlowski; Kimon Zachos	6; 2	6; 2	6; 3
5	(Poland) (Greece)	Ignacy Tłoczyński; Lazaros Stalios	6; 0	6; 2	6; 2

==== Denmark vs. Germany ====
Denmark
0
Copenhagen, Denmark
24–26 August 1934

Germany
5

			1	2	3	4	5
1	(Denmark) (Germany)	Anker Jacobsen; Henner Henkel	11; 13	3; 6	2; 6
2	(Denmark) (Germany)	Einer Ulrich; Gottfried von Cramm	3; 6	1; 6	2; 6
3	(Denmark) (Germany)	Anker Jacobsen / Einer Ulrich; Gottfried von Cramm / Hans Denker	6; 8	3; 6	5; 7
4	(Denmark) (Germany)	Einer Ulrich; Henner Henkel	2; 6	4; 6	1; 6
5	(Denmark) (Germany)	Anker Jacobsen; Gottfried von Cramm	2; 6	2; 6	0; 6

==== Sweden vs. Netherlands ====
Sweden
2
Tennisstadion, Stockholm, Sweden
24–26 August 1934
Clay

Netherlands
3

			1	2	3	4	5
1	(Sweden) (Netherlands)	Curt Östberg; Josef Knottenbelt	6; 1	6; 1	6; 4
2	(Sweden) (Netherlands)	Kalle Schröder; Hendrik Timmer	0; 6	4; 6	3; 6
3	(Sweden) (Netherlands)	Curt Östberg / Kalle Schröder; Ody Koopman / Hendrik Timmer	4; 6	1; 6	1; 6
4	(Sweden) (Netherlands)	Curt Östberg; Hendrik Timmer	1; 6	3; 6	1; 6
5	(Sweden) (Netherlands)	Kalle Schröder; Josef Knottenbelt	6; 1	7; 5	6; 0

==== Hungary vs. Yugoslavia ====
Hungary
2
Budapest, Hungary
31 August–2 September 1934

Yugoslavia
3

			1	2	3	4	5
1	(Hungary) (Kingdom of Yugoslavia)	Elek Straub; Josip Palada	6; 0	6; 1	6; 4
2	(Hungary) (Kingdom of Yugoslavia)	Emil Gábori; Franjo Punčec	6; 3	1; 6	5; 7	3; 6
3	(Hungary) (Kingdom of Yugoslavia)	Emil Gábori / Imre Zichy; Franjo Punčec / Franjo Šefer	4; 6	4; 6	3; 6
4	(Hungary) (Kingdom of Yugoslavia)	Elek Straub; Franjo Punčec	3; 6	4; 6	5; 7
5	(Hungary) (Kingdom of Yugoslavia)	Emil Gábori; Franjo Šefer	6; 4	6; 4	5; 2			retired

== Main round ==
=== Draw ===
First round 10–14 May
Poland
bye
South Africa
bye
Scheveningen, Netherlands (clay)
Netherlands	0
Japan	5
Prague, Czechoslovakia
Czechoslovakia	4
Yugoslavia	1
Eastbourne, England (grass)
Australia	3
New Zealand	0
bye
France
bye
Germany
bye
Italy

Quarterfinals; 17 May–10 June
Warsaw, Poland
Poland	2
South Africa	3
Prague, Czechoslovakia
Japan	1
Czechoslovakia	4
Paris, France (clay)
Australia	3
France	2
Berlin, Germany
Germany	4
Italy	1

Semifinals; 14–17 June
Prague, Czechoslovakia
South Africa	0
Czechoslovakia	5
Berlin, Germany (clay)
Australia	1
Germany	4

Final; 12–14 July
Prague, Czechoslovakia
Czechoslovakia	1
Germany	4

=== First round ===
==== Netherlands vs. Japan ====
Netherlands
0
Scheveningen, Netherlands
10–12 May 1935
Clay

Japan
5

			1	2	3	4	5
1	(Netherlands) (Japan)	Tod Hughan; Jiro Yamagishi	4; 6	3; 6	1; 6
2	(Netherlands) (Japan)	Hendrik Timmer; Hideo Nishimura	5; 7	6; 2	5; 7	4; 6
3	(Netherlands) (Japan)	Tod Hughan / Ody Koopman; Hideo Nishimura / Jiro Yamagishi	4; 6	0; 6	3; 6
4	(Netherlands) (Japan)	Tod Hughan; Hideo Nishimura	3; 6	6; 4	3; 6	11; 9	2; 6
5	(Netherlands) (Japan)	Diederik Teschmacher; Jiro Yamagishi	1; 6	4; 6	3; 6

==== Czechoslovakia vs. Yugoslavia ====
Czechoslovakia
4
Prague, Czechoslovakia
10–12 May 1935

Yugoslavia
1

			1	2	3	4	5
1	(Czechoslovakia) (Kingdom of Yugoslavia)	Roderich Menzel; Franjo Punčec	6; 3	6; 1	6; 1
2	(Czechoslovakia) (Kingdom of Yugoslavia)	Josef Caska; Josip Palada	2; 6	3; 6	3; 6
3	(Czechoslovakia) (Kingdom of Yugoslavia)	Ladislav Hecht / Roderich Menzel; Franjo Kukuljević / Franjo Punčec	4; 6	4; 6	6; 2	8; 6	6; 2
4	(Czechoslovakia) (Kingdom of Yugoslavia)	Roderich Menzel; Josip Palada	6; 0	6; 1	6; 1
5	(Czechoslovakia) (Kingdom of Yugoslavia)	Josef Caska; Franjo Punčec	6; 4	6; 1	4; 6	6; 0

==== Australia vs. New Zealand ====
Australia
3
Devonshire Park Lawn Tennis Club, Eastbourne, England
12–14 May 1935
Grass

New Zealand
0

			1	2	3	4	5
1	(Australia) (New Zealand)	Jack Crawford; Eskell Andrews	6; 4	6; 4	7; 5
2	(Australia) (New Zealand)	Vivian McGrath; Alan Stedman	6; 3	6; 2	8; 6
3	(Australia) (New Zealand)	Jack Crawford / Adrian Quist; Cam Malfroy / Alan Stedman	6; 3	4; 6	6; 1	6; 4
4	(Australia) (New Zealand)	Jack Crawford; Alan Stedman	14; 12	17; 15	4; 3			not completed
5	(Australia) (New Zealand)	Vivian McGrath; Eskell Andrews						not played

=== Quarterfinals ===
==== Poland vs. South Africa ====
Poland
2
Warsaw, Poland
17–19 May 1935

South Africa
3

			1	2	3	4	5
1	(Poland) (South Africa)	Józef Hebda; Norman Farquharson	4; 6	5; 7	6; 4	6; 0	6; 8
2	(Poland) (South Africa)	Kazimierz Tarlowski; Vernon Kirby	7; 9	7; 9	8; 6	6; 4	6; 2
3	(Poland) (South Africa)	Józef Hebda / Ignacy Tłoczyński; Norman Farquharson / Vernon Kirby	3; 6	2; 6	2; 6
4	(Poland) (South Africa)	Kazimierz Tarlowski; Norman Farquharson	6; 3	1; 6	5; 7	3; 6
5	(Poland) (South Africa)	Józef Hebda; Vernon Kirby	4; 6	6; 4	4; 6	6; 1	6; 2

==== Czechoslovakia vs. Japan ====
Czechoslovakia
4
Prague, Czechoslovakia
7–9 June 1935

Japan
1

			1	2	3	4	5
1	(Czechoslovakia) (Japan)	Josef Caska; Jiro Yamagishi	6; 1	8; 6	6; 3
2	(Czechoslovakia) (Japan)	Roderich Menzel; Hideo Nishimura	6; 2	6; 3	8; 6
3	(Czechoslovakia) (Japan)	Ferenc Maršálek / Roderich Menzel; Hideo Nishimura / Jiro Yamagishi	2; 6	6; 2	6; 2	6; 1
4	(Czechoslovakia) (Japan)	Ladislav Hecht; Jiro Yamagishi	1; 6	4; 6	4; 6
5	(Czechoslovakia) (Japan)	Josef Caska; Hideo Nishimura	6; 2	6; 3	6; 8	6; 4

==== France vs. Australia ====
France
2
Stade Roland Garros, Paris, France
8–10 June 1935
Clay

Australia
3

			1	2	3	4	5
1	(France) (Australia)	André Merlin; Jack Crawford	4; 6	6; 4	3; 6	3; 6
2	(France) (Australia)	Christian Boussus; Vivian McGrath	6; 4	4; 6	8; 6	6; 1
3	(France) (Australia)	Marcel Bernard / Jean Borotra; Jack Crawford / Adrian Quist	3; 6	6; 4	8; 10	4; 6
4	(France) (Australia)	Christian Boussus; Jack Crawford	6; 2	4; 6	4; 6	6; 3	7; 9
5	(France) (Australia)	André Merlin; Vivian McGrath	6; 4	5; 7	6; 3	6; 4

==== Germany vs. Italy ====
Germany
4
Berlin, Germany
8–10 June 1935

Italy
1

			1	2	3	4	5
1	(Germany) (Italy)	Henner Henkel; Giorgio de Stefani	1; 6	3; 6	4; 6
2	(Germany) (Italy)	Gottfried von Cramm; Stefano Mangold	6; 0	6; 4	6; 4
3	(Germany) (Italy)	Gottfried von Cramm / Hans Denker; Ferruccio Quintavalle / Valentino Taroni	4; 6	6; 3	2; 6	6; 3	6; 1
4	(Germany) (Italy)	Henner Henkel; Stefano Mangold	6; 1	6; 8	6; 4	6; 4
5	(Germany) (Italy)	Gottfried von Cramm; Giorgio de Stefani	6; 3	6; 4	5; 7	6; 1

=== Semifinals ===
==== Czechoslovakia vs. South Africa ====
Czechoslovakia
5
Prague, Czechoslovakia
15–17 June 1935

South Africa
0

			1	2	3	4	5
1	(Czechoslovakia) (South Africa)	Roderich Menzel; Norman Farquharson	6; 2	5; 7	6; 3	6; 2
2	(Czechoslovakia) (South Africa)	Josef Caska; Maxwell Bertram	6; 2	6; 4	6; 1
3	(Czechoslovakia) (South Africa)	Ferenc Maršálek / Roderich Menzel; Norman Farquharson / Vernon Kirby	9; 11	6; 4	6; 2	6; 1
4	(Czechoslovakia) (South Africa)	Josef Caska; Norman Farquharson	6; 4	6; 2	6; 0
5	(Czechoslovakia) (South Africa)	Ferenc Maršálek; Maxwell Bertram	6; 1	2; 6	6; 3	3; 6	6; 2

==== Germany vs. Australia ====
Germany
4
Rot-Weiss Tennis Club, Berlin, Germany
14–16 June 1935
Clay

Australia
1

			1	2	3	4	5
1	(Germany) (Australia)	Gottfried von Cramm; Jack Crawford	6; 3	7; 5	6; 2
2	(Germany) (Australia)	Henner Henkel; Vivian McGrath	4; 6	6; 2	6; 0	6; 2
3	(Germany) (Australia)	Hans Denker / Kay Lund; Jack Crawford / Adrian Quist	1; 6	9; 11	3; 6
4	(Germany) (Australia)	Gottfried von Cramm; Vivian McGrath	6; 3	4; 6	6; 3	4; 6	6; 2
5	(Germany) (Australia)	Henner Henkel; Jack Crawford	2; 6	6; 3	9; 7	4; 6	6; 4

=== Final ===
==== Czechoslovakia vs. Germany ====
Czechoslovakia
1
Prague, Czechoslovakia
12–14 July 1935

Germany
4

			1	2	3	4	5
1	(Czechoslovakia) (Germany)	Roderich Menzel; Henner Henkel	7; 5	6; 1	4; 6	2; 6	6; 4
2	(Czechoslovakia) (Germany)	Josef Caska; Gottfried von Cramm	2; 6	4; 6	2; 6
3	(Czechoslovakia) (Germany)	Ferenc Maršálek / Roderich Menzel; Gottfried von Cramm / Kay Lund	3; 6	7; 9	4; 6
4	(Czechoslovakia) (Germany)	Roderich Menzel; Gottfried von Cramm	2; 6	4; 6	6; 3	7; 5	1; 6
5	(Czechoslovakia) (Germany)	Josef Caska; Henner Henkel	6; 2	5; 7	4; 6	0; 6
