= Hawaii Davis Cup team =

Hawaii
- First year: 1923
- Years played: 1
- Ties played (W–L): 1 (0–1)
- Most total wins: William Eklund (1–2)
- Most singles wins: William Eklund (1–1)
- Most doubles wins: Bowie Detrick (0–1); William Eklund (1–1)
- Best doubles team: Bowie Detrick / William Eklund (0–1)
- Most ties played: Bowie Detrick; William Eklund (1)
- Most years played: Bowie Detrick; William Eklund (1)

The Hawaii National Lawn Tennis team represented the Territory of Hawaii in the International Lawn Tennis Challenge (now the Davis Cup). They participated in only one tie, losing 4–1 to Australia in the 1923 America Zone. They entered the tournaments in 1922 and 1925, but withdrew before competing.

== Players ==
Player	W-L (Total)	W-L (Singles)	W-L (Doubles)	Ties	Debut	Ref
Bowie Detrick	0–3	0–2	0–1	1	1923	
William Eklund	1–2	1–1	0–1	1	1923	

== 1923 International Lawn Tennis Challenge ==
=== Bracket ===
Semifinals; 26–28 July
Orange, New Jersey, United States (grass)
Australia	4
Hawaii	1
Montreal, Canada (grass)
Canada	0
Japan	5

Final; 9–12 August
Chicago, United States (grass)
Australia	4
Japan	1

=== International Lawn Tennis Challenge tie ===
Year	Competition	Date	Surface	Venue	Opponent	Score	Result
1923	Americas Zone, Semifinals	26–28 July	Grass	Orange Lawn Tennis Club, Orange (USA)	Australia	1–4	Loss

== See also ==
- Davis Cup
- United States Davis Cup team
