= Christiaan van Lennep =

Dutch tennis player (1887–1955)

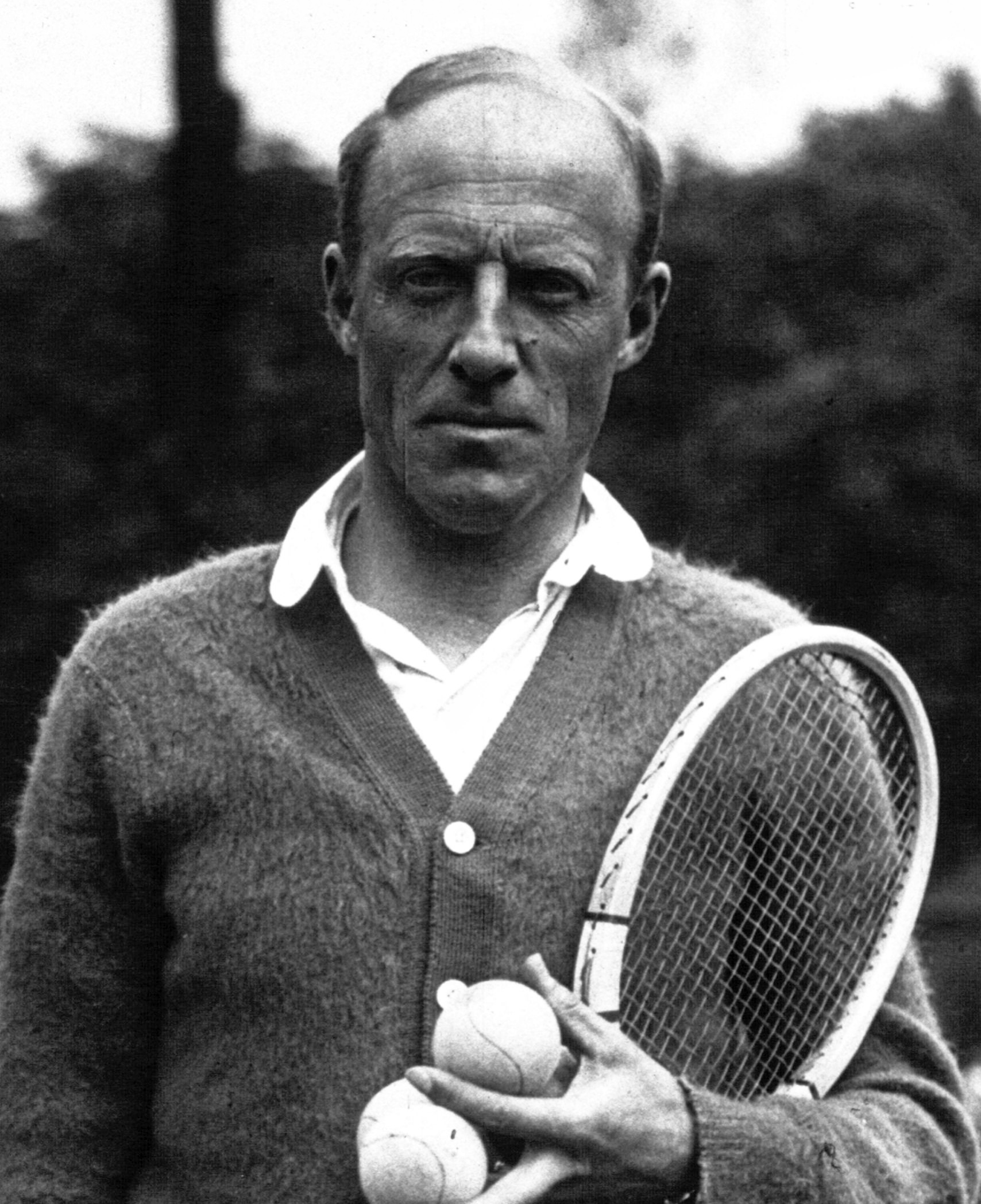
- Country (sports): Netherlands
- Born: 3 January 1887; Hilversum, Netherlands
- Died: 5 December 1955 (aged 68); Rochers de Toveyres, Switzerland
- Retired: 1930
- Plays: Right-handed

Singles

Grand Slam singles results
- French Open: 3R (1927, 1928)
- Wimbledon: 4R (1921)

Doubles

Grand Slam doubles results
- Wimbledon: SF (1926)

Team competitions
- Davis Cup: F^{EU} (1925)

Jonkheer Christiaan van Lennep (Dutch pronunciation: [ˈkrɪstijaːɱ vɑn ˈlɛnɛp]; 3 January 1887 – 5 December 1955) was a Dutch tennis player and multiple Dutch champion.

He won the singles title at the Dutch National Tennis Championships in 1905, 1907, 1919, 1921, 1925 and 1926. He was also a seven times doubles champion.

Van Lennep participated in the singles and doubles events at the 1908 and 1924 Olympics. His best result was reaching the third round in the singles event at the 1924 Olympics in Paris. In the third round, he lost to American Watson Washburn by three sets to one. He reached the final of the singles event at the inaugural British Hard Court Championships, played in Torquay in April 1924, in which Randolph Lycett defeated him in four sets.

He was more successful in international doubles competitions as he reached the semifinal of the 1926 Wimbledon Championships partnering Béla von Kehrling.

Van Lennep played in 12 ties for the Dutch Davis Cup team between 1920 and 1928 and has a won-loss record of 14 to 12.

== Ancestry ==
Ancestors of Christiaan van Lennep

16. Cornelis van Lennep
8. David Jacob van Lennep
17. Cornelia Henrietta van de Poll
4. Jacob van Lennep
18. Christiaan van Orsoy
9. Jonkvrouwe Cornelia Christina van Orsoy
19. Anna Louisa van der Poorten
2. Jonkheer Christiaan van Lennep
20. Nicolaas Willem Roëll
10. Willem Frederik Roëll
21. Anna Sophia Frederica van Gheel van Spanbroek
5. Jonkvrouwe Henrietta Sophia Wilhelmina Roëll
22. Johannes Hop
11. Sara Johanna Hop
23. Maria Henriëtta van der Hoop
1. Christiaan van Lennep
6. Auguste Próspere Küpfer
3. Charlotta Louise Küpfer
7. Charlotte Louise Coblijn
