= West Side Tennis Club =

Tennis club in New York City

Forest Hills Stadium
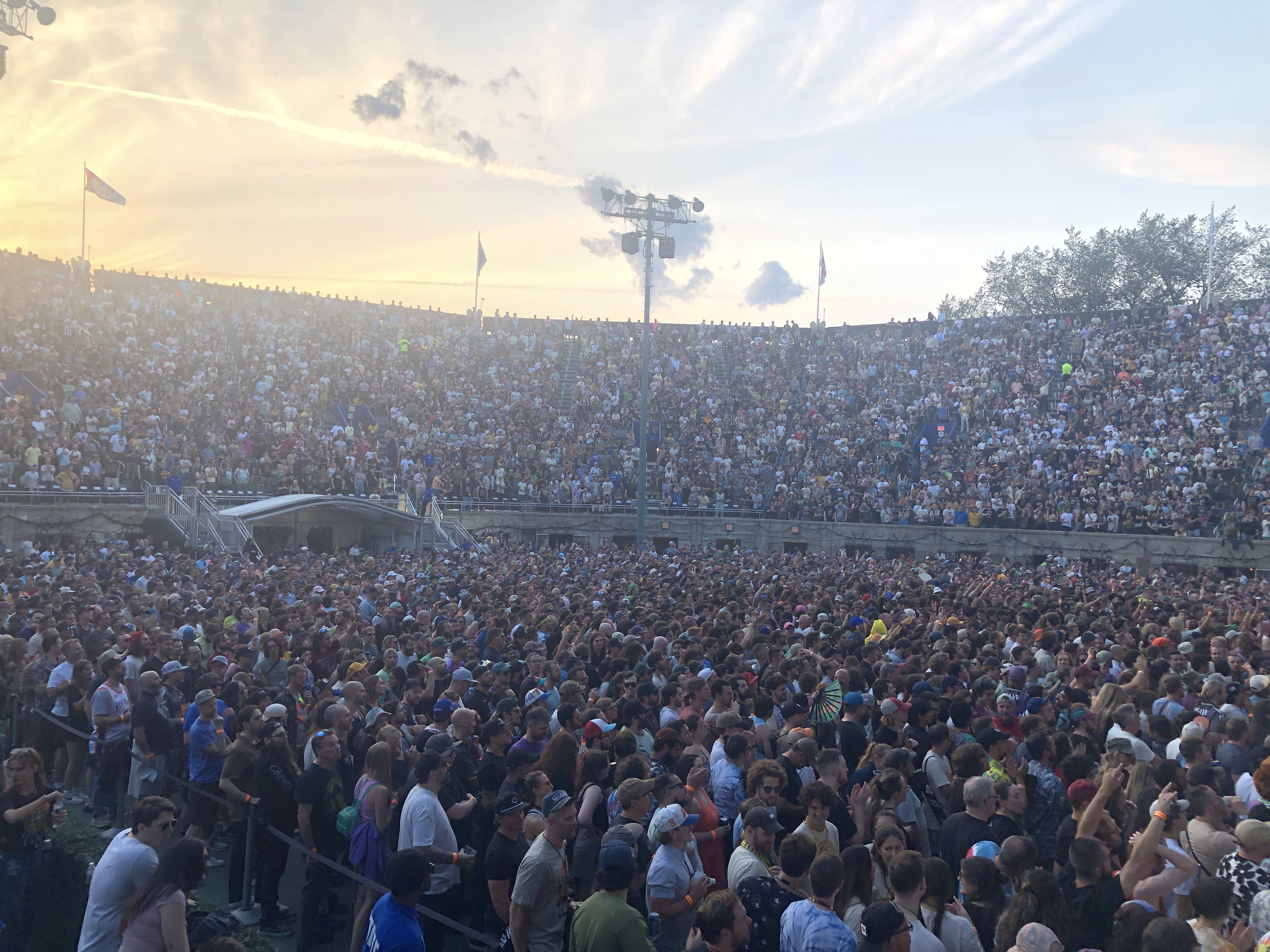
- A concert at Forest Hills on August 2, 2025
- Interactive map of Forest Hills Stadium
- Former names: Forest Hills Tennis Stadium
- Location: One Tennis Place; Forest Hills, Queens, NY, U.S. 11375
- Coordinates: 40.7196°N 73.8487°W
- Public transit: Long Island Rail Road (LIRR) at Forest Hills; New York City Subway: trains at Forest Hills–71st Avenue; New York City Bus: Q23, Q60, Q90, Q64, Q74, QM4, QM11, QM12, QM18, QM42, QM44

Website
- www.foresthillstennis.com

The West Side Tennis Club is a private tennis club located in Forest Hills, a neighborhood in the New York City borough of Queens. The club has 38 tennis courts in all four surfaces (clay court, Har-Tru, grass court and hardcourt), a junior Olympic-size swimming pool and other amenities. It is the home of the Forest Hills Stadium (originally Forest Hills Tennis Stadium), a 14,000 seat outdoor tennis stadium and concert venue.

The club hosted 60 editions of the U.S. National Championships (renamed the US Open Tennis Championships in 1968), first from 1915 to 1920, and then again from 1924 to 1977. In addition, the finals of the Davis Cup were held at the club ten times, more than any other venue. The US Pro tournament was held at the venue eleven times, and another prominent professional tournament, the Tournament of Champions, was held at the venue three times. The West Side Tennis Club was the venue of the Forest Hills Tennis Classic, a now-defunct WTA Tour Tier IV event, and a men's clay courts challenger event, the ATP Challenger Forest Hills, known as the West Side Tennis Club Clay Court Challenger. The Open saw some of its biggest moments and changes while at West Side, including the introduction of seedings in 1927, tiebreakers in 1970, equal prize money for men and women in 1973, and night play in 1975. Currently, the stadium is used as an outdoor concert venue.

== History ==
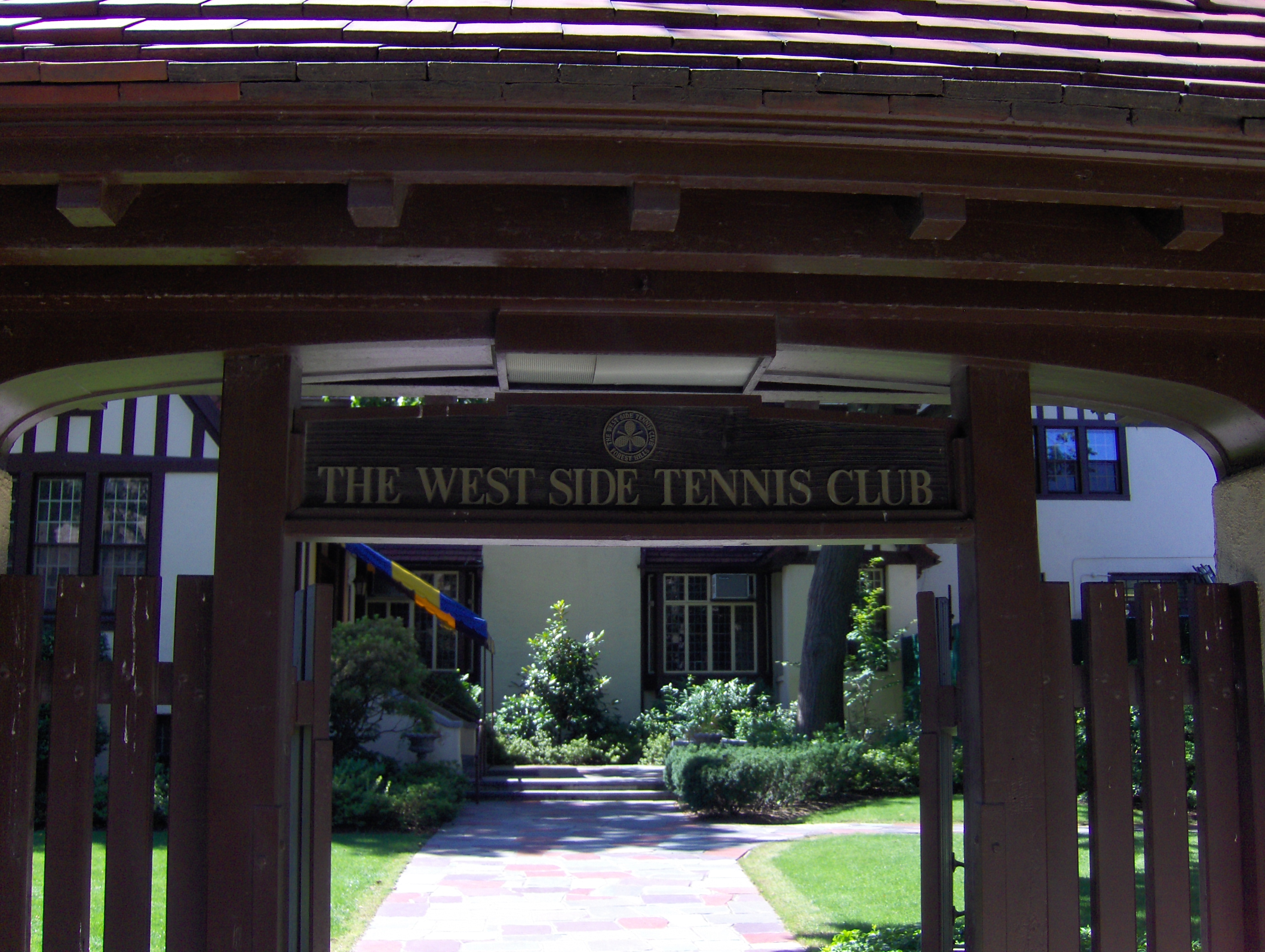
Entrance

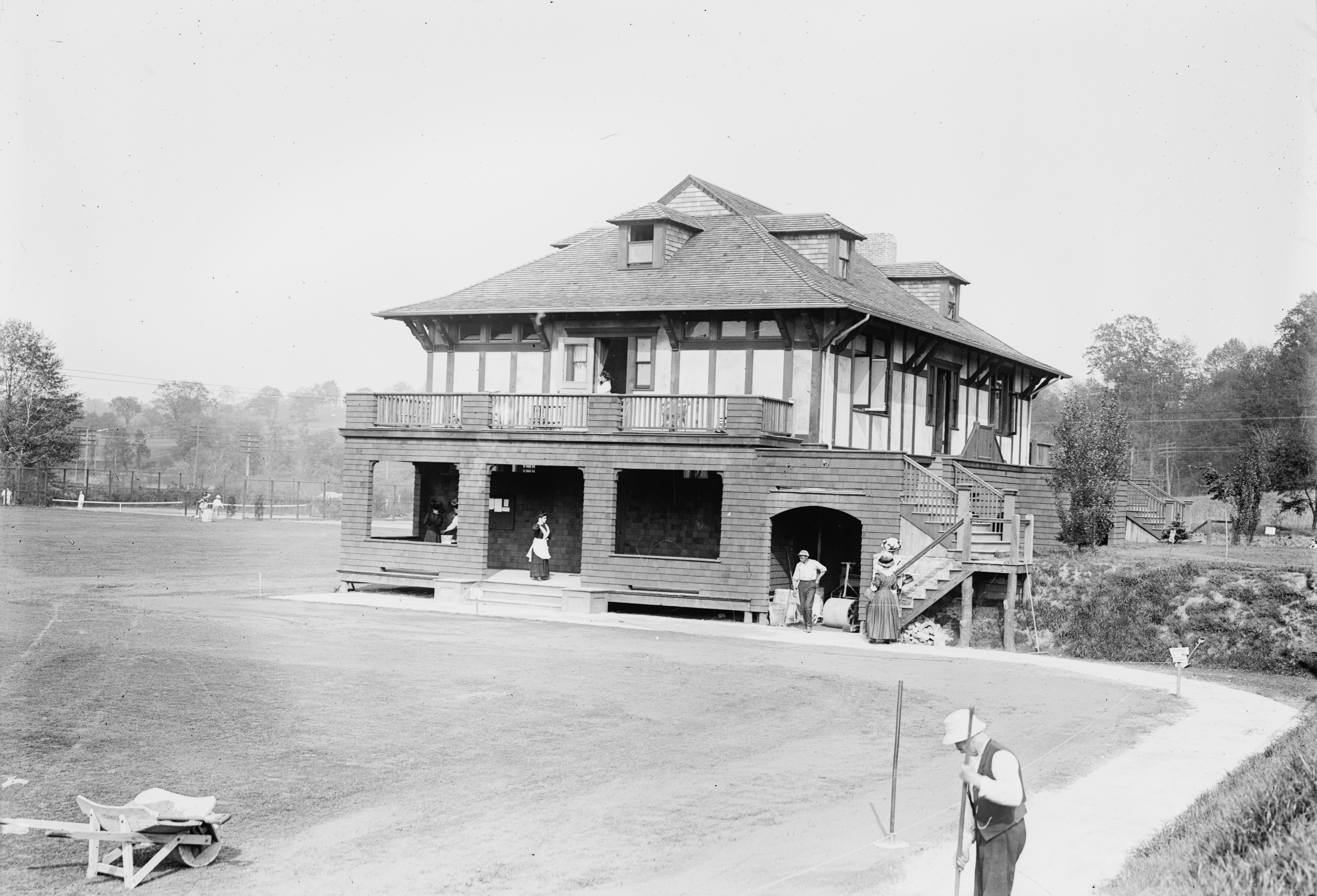
Clubhouse, 1912

The club was founded in 1892 when 13 original members rented land on Central Park West for three clay courts and a small clubhouse. Ten years later, the land had become too valuable, and the club moved to a site near Columbia University with room for eight courts. In 1908, the club moved again to a property at 238th Street and Broadway. The new site covered two city blocks and had 12 grass courts and 15 clay courts.

The club hosted the International Lawn Tennis Challenge (now known as the Davis Cup) in 1911. With crowds in the thousands, the club leadership realized that it would need to expand to a more permanent location. In 1912, a site in Forest Hills, Queens, was purchased. The signature Tudor-style clubhouse was built the next year.

In 1915, the United States Lawn Tennis Association National Championship, later renamed the U.S. Open, moved to West Side. By 1923, the success of the event necessitated the construction of a 14,000-seat horseshoe-shaped stadium that still stands today. The stadium's first event was the 1923 Wightman Cup, a precursor to the final of the International Lawn Tennis Challenge, which saw the U.S. defeat Australia.

Beginning in 1971, the stadium was home to the annual Robert F. Kennedy Memorial Tennis Tournament which was a celebrity pro-am for charity featuring the likes of Chevy Chase, Arnold Schwarzenegger, Carlos Santana, Edward M. Kennedy, Elton John and more throughout the decade.

In 1975, the tournament was switched to Har-Tru clay courts. By 1978, the tournament had outgrown West Side, and the USTA moved the tournament to the new USTA National Tennis Center in Flushing Meadows under USTA President William Hester's leadership. In 2008, the stadium was the site of a women's satellite tournament.

The New York Empire of World TeamTennis announced it would play its home matches, coached by Patrick McEnroe, at the stadium beginning with its inaugural 2016 season. The team relocated to the USTA Billie Jean King National Tennis Center for its second season in 2017.

== Forest Hills Stadium ==
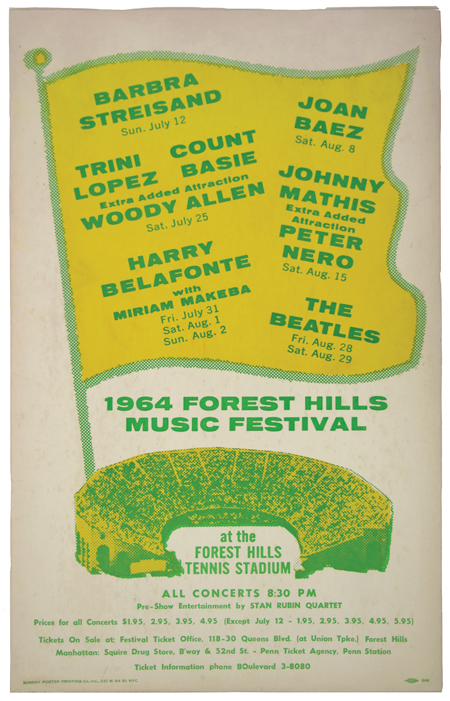
Poster for 1964 concerts at Forest Hills Tennis Stadium, headlining Barbra Streisand, Count Basie, Woody Allen, Johnny Mathis, Harry Belafonte, Peter Nero, and The Beatles.

In addition to hosting the main court for tennis championships, the Forest Hills Stadium has been used as a concert venue. In the 1960s and 1970s, the venue was host to performances by The Beatles, Ray Charles, Bob Dylan, The Monkees with Jimi Hendrix, Diana Ross and The Supremes, Simon & Garfunkel, Frank Sinatra, Barbra Streisand, and The Rolling Stones.

From 1961 to 1971, the stadium was also the location for the Forest Hills Music Festival.

Following the 1978 departure of the Open the stadium fell into such disrepair that by 2011 it was called a "crumbling ruin" and was denied landmark status by the New York City Landmarks Preservation Commission. Fewer concerts were held at the stadium in the 1980s, including The Cars, Peter Gabriel, Genesis, Hall & Oates, and Talking Heads. In 1997, the stadium hosted two festivals: The 92.3 K-Rock Dysfunctional Family Picnic featuring Foo Fighters, Blur, and Echo & The Bunnymen, and the Furthur Festival featuring Bob Weir and RatDog, Mickey Hart and Planet Drum, Bruce Hornsby, and The Black Crowes.

The West Side Tennis Club received an offer in 2010 to raze the stadium and replace it with condominiums.

However, in mid-2013, the stadium re-opened as an outdoor concert venue with Mumford & Sons performing the inaugural concert on August 28. Since then the Forest Hills Stadium has held a regular summer concert series featuring Santana, Zac Brown Band, D'Angelo, Van Morrison, Arctic Monkeys, and others. It is also the summer home of The New York Pops.

From 2013 to 2017, an extensive renovation to revitalize the venue included several significant upgrades. Starting with patching up concrete exterior walls, old seats were removed and replaced by initially 1,200 new seats in 2014. A permanent stage was installed, designed by Mark Fisher, renowned for his sets for Pink Floyd, U2, and the Rolling Stones. A new concourse redesign expanded it to twice its original size for attendees to relax on a grassy court as well as easier access to food and beverage concessions. In addition to reserved seating in the club and bowl were improved seating options for people with disabilities. And after 70 years the central tennis courts were replaced with a standing room general admission floor to accommodate many thousands more people. Unique VIP party lounges were created from unused spaces discovered beneath the stadium after removal of decades-worth of rubble and debris. Plans announced in 2018 to turn the stadium into a year-round venue as a winter village with an ice skating rink have yet to be realized as of 2022.

On October 17, 2025, the mayoral campaign of Zohran Mamdani hosted a rally with 13,000 people at the stadium. Speakers included Bernie Sanders, Alexandria Ocasio-Cortez and Governor Kathy Hochul.

The stadium also has a history of use as a filming location. The Alfred Hitchcock film Strangers on a Train (1951) was filmed in part during the 1950 Davis Cup finals at the West Side Tennis Club on August 25–27, 1950. Several scenes in Wes Anderson's The Royal Tenenbaums (2001) were filmed in and around the stadium, including the "Windswept Fields" meltdown of Richie Tenenbaum which is commemorated by a plaque.

=== Noise complaints ===
Following backlash from residents living near the stadium, a curfew of 10 p.m. was implemented for all shows. In 2014, shortly after the stadium's re-opening, concerts by Brand New and Modest Mouse, Zac Brown Band, and Lil Wayne saw decibel levels above the city's noise code, leading to warnings being issued. A month after meeting with the Environmental Protection Department to discuss strategies for mitigating noise, The Replacements performed over the decibel limit three times during their finale, and the stadium was fined $3,200. In 2015, the stadium spent $500,000 on noise suppression methods including a concrete fence and stairway covers.

An October 2022 concert featuring Yeah Yeah Yeahs and Japanese Breakfast resulted in 62 noise complaints, the highest number recorded for the stadium. In May 2023, the stadium was sued by the Forest Hills Gardens Corporation for violating the neighborhood's residential zoning regulations. In response, West Side Tennis Club and its booker countersued and a judge provided an injunction allowing for Burns Street to remain open for the over 30 concerts that were scheduled at the stadium that summer. The stadium was sued three times in total for noise complaints in 2023.

On March 25, 2025, the Forest Hills Gardens Corporation, a private group that manages the surrounding residential community, refused to give the New York City Police Department (NYPD) access to close the privately owned streets for concerts and denied the stadium permits for summer concerts later in the year. Another group, Concerned Citizens of Forest Hills, led by an attorney who lives in the area, also sued the venue for violating noise limits. Without access to these roads, the NYPD claimed they "would be unable to manage public safety around the stadium" and that "the city had no choice but to revoke the concert permits". However, neither the stadium, nor its management received notice from the NYPD of their permits being revoked. The Queens Chamber of Commerce supported the stadium, denouncing its opponents as "outrageous and unacceptable." On April 15, 2025, it was reported that an agreement was reached to allow concerts to occur there again. In 2026, the city reached a settlement in which it agreed to pay residents $150,000.

Preceded by Worple Road, London; Comain Cricket Club, Auckland; Kooyong Stadium, Melbourne; White City Stadium, Sydney; Milton Courts, Brisbane	Davis Cup; Final Venue; 1914; 1921 • 1922 • 1923; 1947 • 1948 • 1949 • 1950; 1955; 1959	Succeeded by Double Bay Grounds, Sydney; Germantown Cricket Club, Philadelphia; White City Stadium, Sydney; Memorial Drive Park, Adelaide; White City Stadium, Sydney
Preceded by Newport Casino (1881–1914); Germantown Cricket Club (1921–1923)	Home of the U.S. Open; 1915–1920; 1924–1977	Succeeded by Germantown Cricket Club (1921–1923); USTA Billie Jean King National Tennis Center (1978–present)
