= Sweden Davis Cup team =

Davis Cup team representing Sweden

Sweden
- Captain: Robin Söderling
- ITF ranking: 14 (6 December 2021)
- Colors: Yellow and blue
- First year: 1925
- Years played: 87
- Ties played (W–L): 239 (157–82)
- Years in World Group: 33 (57–26)
- Davis Cup titles: 7 (1975, 1984, 1985, 1987, 1994, 1997, 1998)
- Runners-up: 5 (1983, 1986, 1988, 1989, 1996)
- Most total wins: Ulf Schmidt (66–36)
- Most singles wins: Jan-Erik Lundqvist (47–16)
- Most doubles wins: Sven Davidson (23–9)
- Best doubles team: Ulf Schmidt & Jan-Erik Lundqvist (16–8)
- Most ties played: Ulf Schmidt (38)
- Most years played: Jonas Björkman (14)
- Last updated on: 25 March 2020.

The Sweden Davis Cup team represents Sweden in Davis Cup tennis competition and is governed by the Swedish Tennis Association, known in Swedish as Svenska Tennisförbundet.

Sweden is the fifth most successful nation in Davis Cup history, having won the title 7 times, including 6 titles since the creation of the World Group in 1981. Since the abolition of the Challenge Round, Sweden holds the record for most consecutive years in the final with seven years from 1983 to 1989 and have defended the title on two occasions in 1984–85 and 1997–98, a feat only also accomplished by the United States Davis Cup team.

== History ==
As the 26th nation Sweden entered their first competition in 1925. Led by the captain Fredrik Bohnstedt the Swedes defeated the Swiss at LTC Bern. The first nominated team included Sune Malmström, Marcus Wallenberg and Carl-Erik von Braun.

In September 2012, Sweden was relegated from the World Group after being defeated, 0–5, against Belgium, and played in the Europe/Africa Zone Group I in seasons 2013, 2014, and 2015. In 2016, Sweden was relegated to the Europe/Africa Zone Group II, but after a successful 2017 campaign, returned to the Europe/Africa Zone Group I for 2018. In September 2018, Sweden defeated Switzerland in their World Group play-off tie and, as a result, guaranteed themselves a seeding for the February 2019 Qualifying Round for the new-look Davis Cup Finals in 2019.

Sweden failed to advance to the Davis Cup Finals as it lost its World Group play-off, against Colombia, during February 2019. After beating Israel in September 2019, Sweden once again won a place in the 2020 Qualifiers.

== Results and fixtures ==
The following are lists of match results and scheduled matches for the current year.

Win Loss Fixture

=== 2025 ===
2025 Davis Cup Qualifiers first round

Sweden
1
Kungliga Tennishallen, Stockholm, Sweden
31 January–1 February 2025
Hard (i)

Australia
3

			1	2	3
1	(Sweden) (Australia)	Mikael Ymer; Alex de Minaur	5; 7	1; 6
2	(Sweden) (Australia)	Leo Borg; Aleksandar Vukic	4; 6	4; 6
3	(Sweden) (Australia)	Filip Bergevi / André Göransson; Matthew Ebden / John Peers	7^{9} 6^{7}	3; 6	2; 6
4	(Sweden) (Australia)	Leo Borg; John Peers	7; 5	6; 4
5	(Sweden) (Australia)	Mikael Ymer; Aleksandar Vukic				not played

2025 Davis Cup World Group I

Sweden

Sweden
12–14 September 2025

Tunisia

		1	2	3
1	(Sweden) (Tunisia)
2	(Sweden) (Tunisia)
3	(Sweden) (Tunisia)
4	(Sweden) (Tunisia)
5	(Sweden) (Tunisia)

== Players ==
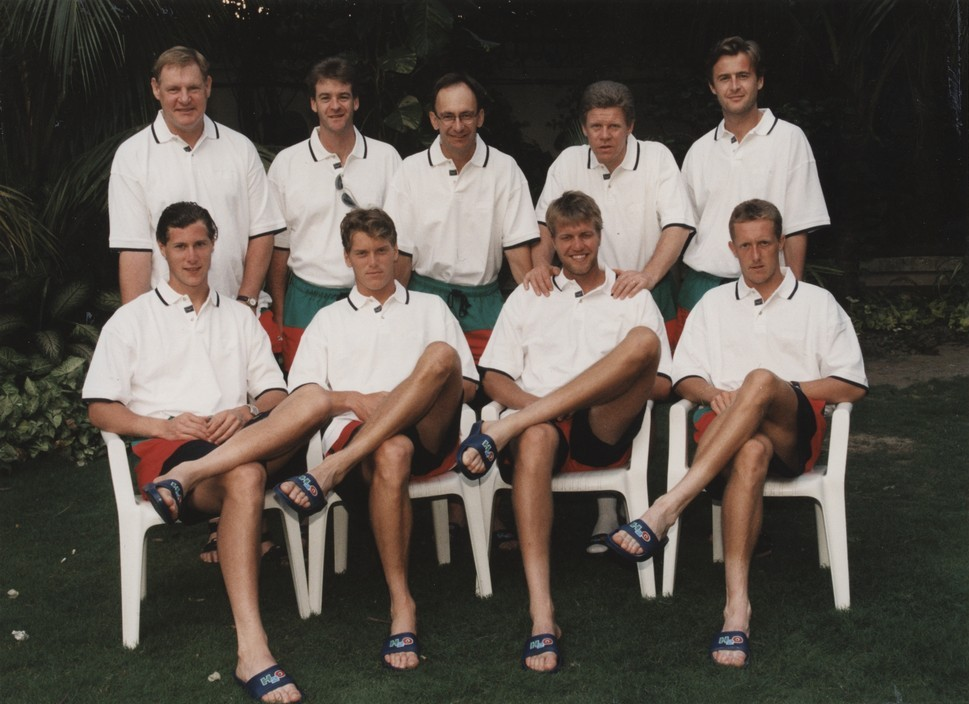
The 1996 team and management after the match against India

=== Current team ===
- Leo Borg (singles)
- Elias Ymer (singles)
- Mikael Ymer (singles)
- Adam Heinonen (singles)
- André Göransson (doubles)
- Filip Bergevi (doubles)

== See also ==
- Davis Cup
- Sweden Billie Jean King Cup team
- Sweden at the Hopman Cup
