= 1923 International Lawn Tennis Challenge =

1923 edition of the International Lawn Tennis Challenge

Details
- Duration: 15 May – 3 September 1923
- Edition: 18th
- Teams: 17

Champion
- Winning nation: United States

The 1923 International Lawn Tennis Challenge was the 18th edition of what is now known as the Davis Cup. For the first time, the competition was split into two zones: the America Zone and the Europe Zone. This change was necessitated by having more than 16 teams compete for the cup (thus not fitting into one easily workable draw). The past several years had also seen a rise in the number of defaults, as teams from around the globe tried to work out the logistics of playing such an international tournament. Regional zones would help alleviate these problems.

The Europe Zone consisted of 13 teams, while the America Zone was made up of 4 teams. Australia, Hawaii, Ireland and Switzerland competed for the first and only time. The winners of the Zones met in an Inter-Zonal play-off, with the winner challenging defending champions the United States for the championship.

Australia defeated France in the Inter-Zonal play-off, but again lost to the United States in the Challenge Round. The final was played at the West Side Tennis Club in New York City on 31 August – 3 September.

== America Zone ==
=== Draw ===
Semifinals; 26–28 July
Orange, NJ, United States (grass)
Australia	4
Hawaii	1
Montreal, Canada (grass)
Canada	0
Japan	5

Final; 9–12 August
Chicago, IL, United States (grass)
Australia	4
Japan	1

=== Final ===
Australia vs. Japan

Australia
4
South Side Tennis Club, Chicago, IL, United States
9–12 August 1923
Grass

Japan
1

			1	2	3	4	5
1	(Australia) (Japan)	James Anderson; Zenzo Shimizu	6; 0	6; 3	6; 3
2	(Australia) (Japan)	John Hawkes; Masanosuke Fukuda	6; 3	6; 4	6; 3
3	(Australia) (Japan)	James Anderson / John Hawkes; Seiichiro Kashio / Zenzo Shimizu	6; 1	6; 2	6; 2
4	(Australia) (Japan)	John Hawkes; Zenzo Shimizu	4; 6	6; 3	6; 2	1; 6	4; 6
5	(Australia) (Japan)	James Anderson; Masanosuke Fukuda	6; 1	3; 6	6; 2	6; 1

== Europe Zone ==
=== Draw ===
First Round; 15 May–4 June
Netherlands
bye
Italy
bye
Brussels, Belgium (clay)
Great Britain	3
Belgium	2
Spain	w/o
Romania
Bordeaux, France (clay)
France	4
Denmark	1
Dublin, Ireland (grass)
Ireland	3
India	2
Territet, Switzerland
Switzerland	3
Czechoslovakia	2
bye
Argentina

Quarterfinals; 1–23 June
Noordwijk, Netherlands (clay)
Netherlands	5
Italy	0
Manchester, England (grass)
Great Britain	2
Spain	3
Dublin, Ireland (grass)
France	4
Ireland	1
Geneva, Switzerland
Switzerland	4
Argentina	1

Semifinals; 9–15 July
Eastbourne, England (grass)
Netherlands	0
Spain	5
Lyon, France (clay)
France	3
Switzerland	2

Final; 28 July–1 August
Deauville, France (clay)
Spain	2
France	3

=== Final ===
France vs. Spain

France
3
Sporting Club, Deauville, France
28 July – 1 August 1923
Clay

Spain
2

			1	2	3	4	5
1	(France) (Spain)	René Lacoste; Manuel de Gomar	6; 3	6; 4	5; 7	6; 4
2	(France) (Spain)	Jean-François Blanchy; Eduardo Flaquer	6; 1	6; 2	3; 6	6; 1
3	(France) (Spain)	Jacques Brugnon / Henri Cochet; Eduardo Flaquer / Manuel de Gomar	4; 6	6; 8	13; 11	6; 1	4; 6
4	(France) (Spain)	René Lacoste; Eduardo Flaquer	6; 1	6; 3	6; 2
5	(France) (Spain)	Jean-François Blanchy; Manuel de Gomar	3; 6	6; 2	2; 6	2; 6

== Inter-Zonal Final ==
Australia vs. France

Australia
4
Longwood Cricket Club, Boston, MA, United States
16–18 August 1923
Grass

France
1

			1	2	3	4	5
1	(Australia) (France)	James Anderson; René Lacoste	7; 5	6; 3	6; 4
2	(Australia) (France)	John Hawkes; Jacques Brugnon	6; 2	6; 1	7; 5
3	(Australia) (France)	James Anderson / John Hawkes; Jacques Brugnon / René Lacoste	6; 8	6; 3	6; 3	6; 8	9; 7
4	(Australia) (France)	James Anderson; Pierre Hirsch	7; 5	6; 2	6; 0
5	(Australia) (France)	Ian McInnes; René Lacoste	2; 6	1; 6	2; 6

== Challenge Round ==
United States vs. Australia

United States
4
West Side Tennis Club, New York, NY, United States
31 August–3 September 1923
Grass

Australia
1

			1	2	3	4	5
1	(United States) (Australia)	Bill Johnston; James Anderson	6; 4	2; 6	6; 2	5; 7	2; 6
2	(United States) (Australia)	Bill Tilden; John Hawkes	6; 4	6; 2	6; 1
3	(United States) (Australia)	Bill Tilden / Richard Norris Williams; James Anderson / John Hawkes	17; 15	11; 13	2; 6	6; 3	6; 2
4	(United States) (Australia)	Bill Johnston; John Hawkes	6; 0	6; 2	6; 1
5	(United States) (Australia)	Bill Tilden; James Anderson	6; 2	6; 3	1; 6	7; 5

== See also ==
- 1923 Wightman Cup
