= 1981 Davis Cup World Group =

- Date: 6 March – 13 December
- Edition: 1st

Champions
- United States
- Davis Cup

The World Group was the highest level of Davis Cup competition in 1981. It was the first edition of the newly formed 16-team World Group and a move to a tiered system including promotion and relegation. The original 16 teams to compete were chosen through the previous year's results, with teams that reached the 1980 Zonal semifinals chosen to compete in the inaugural bracket. The first-round losers would play in the Davis Cup World Group Relegation Play-offs, with the four losers relegated to their respective Zonal competitions the following year and replaced by the four winners of the current year's Zonal competitions.

Czechoslovakia were the defending champions, but were eliminated in the quarterfinals.

The United States won the title, defeating Argentina in the final, 3–1. The final was held at the Riverfront Coliseum in Cincinnati, Ohio, United States from 11 to 13 December. It was the US team's 27th Davis Cup title overall.

== Participating teams ==
Participating teams
Argentina	Australia	Brazil	Czechoslovakia
France	Great Britain	Italy	Japan
Mexico	New Zealand	Romania	South Korea
Sweden	Switzerland	United States	West Germany

=== Draw ===
First round 6–8 March
Munich, West Germany (indoor carpet)
West Germany	2
Argentina	3
Timișoara, Romania (indoor hard)
Romania	3
Brazil	2
Brighton, United Kingdom (indoor carpet)
Great Britain	3
Italy	2
Seoul, South Korea (clay)
South Korea	0
New Zealand	5
Yokohama, Japan (indoor carpet)
Japan	0
Sweden	5
Lyon, France (indoor carpet)
France	2
Australia	3
Zürich, Switzerland (indoor hard)
Switzerland	2
Czechoslovakia	3
Carlsbad, CA, United States (hard)
United States	3
Mexico	2

Quarterfinals; 9–12 July
Timișoara, Romania (hard)
Argentina	3
Romania	2
Christchurch, New Zealand (carpet)
Great Britain	4
New Zealand	1
Båstad, Sweden (clay)
Sweden	1
Australia	3
New York, NY, United States (hard)
Czechoslovakia	1
United States	4

Semifinals; 2–4 October
Buenos Aires, Argentina (clay)
Argentina	5
Great Britain	0
Portland, OR, United States (indoor carpet)
Australia	0
United States	5

Final; 11–13 December
Cincinnati, OH, United States (indoor carpet)
Argentina	1
United States	3

== First round ==
=== West Germany vs. Argentina ===
West Germany
2
Rudi-Sedlmayer-Halle, Munich, West Germany
6–8 March 1981
Carpet (indoors)

Argentina
3

			1	2	3	4	5
1	(West Germany) (Argentina)	Rolf Gehring; Guillermo Vilas	2; 6	3; 6	6; 8
2	(West Germany) (Argentina)	Ulrich Pinner; José Luis Clerc	3; 6	6; 3	6; 4	6; 3
3	(West Germany) (Argentina)	Rolf Gehring / Christoph Zipf; José Luis Clerc / Guillermo Vilas	3; 6	6; 4	4; 6	3; 6
4	(West Germany) (Argentina)	Rolf Gehring; José Luis Clerc	6; 1	4; 6	6; 3	6; 1
5	(West Germany) (Argentina)	Ulrich Pinner; Guillermo Vilas	3; 6	2; 6	6; 3	1; 6

=== Romania vs. Brazil ===
Romania
3
Timișoara, Romania
6–8 March 1981
Hard (indoors)

Brazil
2

			1	2	3	4	5
1	(Romania) (Brazil)	Florin Segărceanu; Carlos Kirmayr	4; 6	7; 5	6; 2	6; 2
2	(Romania) (Brazil)	Andrei Dîrzu; Thomaz Koch	2; 6	4; 6	1; 6
3	(Romania) (Brazil)	Andrei Dîrzu / Florin Segărceanu; Carlos Kirmayr / Thomaz Koch	0; 6	8; 6	6; 4	7; 5
4	(Romania) (Brazil)	Florin Segărceanu; Thomaz Koch	4; 6	6; 3	7; 5	4; 6	6; 0
5	(Romania) (Brazil)	Andrei Dîrzu; Carlos Kirmayr	2; 6	0; 6

=== Great Britain vs. Italy ===
Great Britain
3
Brighton Centre, Brighton, United Kingdom
6–8 March 1981
Carpet (indoors)

Italy
2

			1	2	3	4	5
1	(United Kingdom) (Italy)	Buster Mottram; Adriano Panatta	9; 7	3; 6	6; 3	6; 4
2	(United Kingdom) (Italy)	Richard Lewis; Corrado Barazzutti	4; 6	6; 1	8; 6	7; 9	4; 6
3	(United Kingdom) (Italy)	Andrew Jarrett / Jonathan Smith; Paolo Bertolucci / Adriano Panatta	6; 1	3; 6	6; 3	3; 6	7; 5
4	(United Kingdom) (Italy)	Richard Lewis; Adriano Panatta	4; 6	2; 6	4; 6
5	(United Kingdom) (Italy)	Buster Mottram; Corrado Barazzutti	6; 3	6; 2	6; 2

=== South Korea vs. New Zealand ===
South Korea
0
Jang-Choong Tennis Court, Seoul, South Korea
6–8 March 1981
Clay

New Zealand
5

			1	2	3	4	5
1	(South Korea) (New Zealand)	Jeon Chang-dae; Chris Lewis	3; 6	3; 6	6; 2	1; 6
2	(South Korea) (New Zealand)	Jeon Young-dai; Russell Simpson	1; 6	2; 6	2; 6
3	(South Korea) (New Zealand)	Jeon Young-dai / Kim Bong-suk; Chris Lewis / Russell Simpson	3; 6	2; 6	4; 6
4	(South Korea) (New Zealand)	Jeon Chang-dae; Chris Lewis	1; 6	4; 6	5; 7
5	(South Korea) (New Zealand)	Jeon Young-dai; Russell Simpson	2; 6	6; 8	0; 6

=== Japan vs. Sweden ===
Japan
0
Yokohama Cultural Gymnasium, Yokohama, Japan
6–8 March 1981
Carpet (indoors)

Sweden
5

			1	2	3	4	5
1	(Japan) (Sweden)	Tsuyoshi Fukui; Kjell Johansson	5; 7	2; 6	4; 6
2	(Japan) (Sweden)	Jun Kamiwazumi; Per Hjertquist	3; 6	5; 7	6; 8
3	(Japan) (Sweden)	Kenichi Hirai / Jun Kamiwazumi; Anders Järryd / Hans Simonsson	0; 6	6; 8	2; 6
4	(Japan) (Sweden)	Tsuyoshi Fukui; Per Hjertquist	4; 6	2; 6	0; 6
5	(Japan) (Sweden)	Shigeyuki Nishio; Kjell Johansson	3; 6	6; 3	2; 6	1; 6

=== France vs. Australia ===
France
2
Palais des Sports, Lyon, France
6–8 March 1981
Carpet (indoors)

Australia
3

			1	2	3	4	5
1	(France) (Australia)	Yannick Noah; Peter McNamara	6; 4	6; 8	3; 6	6; 3	3; 6
2	(France) (Australia)	Pascal Portes; Kim Warwick	4; 6	6; 2	9; 7	6; 4
3	(France) (Australia)	Yannick Noah / Pascal Portes; Mark Edmondson / Kim Warwick	3; 6	2; 6	7; 5	4; 6
4	(France) (Australia)	Pascal Portes; Peter McNamara	3; 6	0; 6	2; 6
5	(France) (Australia)	Yannick Noah; Kim Warwick	6; 2	7; 5	10; 8

=== Switzerland vs. Czechoslovakia ===
Switzerland
2
Saalsporthalle, Zurich, Switzerland
6–8 March 1981
Hard (indoors)

Czechoslovakia
3

			1	2	3	4	5
1	(Switzerland) (Czechoslovakia)	Heinz Günthardt; Ivan Lendl	3; 6	5; 7	0; 6
2	(Switzerland) (Czechoslovakia)	Roland Stadler; Tomáš Šmíd	2; 6	1; 6	3; 6
3	(Switzerland) (Czechoslovakia)	Heinz Günthardt / Markus Günthardt; Ivan Lendl / Tomáš Šmíd	6; 3	3; 6	2; 6	6; 3	6; 4
4	(Switzerland) (Czechoslovakia)	Heinz Günthardt; Tomáš Šmíd	5; 7	2; 6	6; 8
5	(Switzerland) (Czechoslovakia)	Roland Stadler; Ivan Lendl	6; 6					retired

=== United States vs. Mexico ===
United States
3
La Costa Resort and Spa, Carlsbad, CA, United States
6–8 March 1981
Hard

Mexico
2

			1	2	3	4	5
1	(United States) (Mexico)	John McEnroe; Jorge Lozano	6; 3	6; 1	6; 3
2	(United States) (Mexico)	Roscoe Tanner; Raúl Ramírez	6; 3	6; 8	3; 6	10; 8	3; 6
3	(United States) (Mexico)	Marty Riessen / Sherwood Stewart; Jorge Lozano / Raúl Ramírez	4; 6	6; 3	7; 9	6; 0	3; 6
4	(United States) (Mexico)	Roscoe Tanner; Jorge Lozano	6; 2	6; 2	6; 3
5	(United States) (Mexico)	John McEnroe; Raúl Ramírez	6; 4	6; 3	6; 0

== Quarterfinals ==
=== Romania vs. Argentina ===
Romania
2
Timișoara, Romania
9–11 July 1981
Hard

Argentina
3

			1	2	3	4	5
1	(Romania) (Argentina)	Andrei Dîrzu; Guillermo Vilas	4; 6	4; 6	3; 6
2	(Romania) (Argentina)	Florin Segărceanu; José Luis Clerc	4; 6	2; 6	0; 6
3	(Romania) (Argentina)	Andrei Dîrzu / Florin Segărceanu; José Luis Clerc / Guillermo Vilas	4; 6	10; 8	6; 3	7; 5
4	(Romania) (Argentina)	Florin Segărceanu; Guillermo Vilas	4; 6	4; 6	6; 3	1; 6
5	(Romania) (Argentina)	Andrei Dîrzu; Ricardo Cano	4; 6	6; 2				retired

=== New Zealand vs. Great Britain ===
New Zealand
1
Wilding Park, Christchurch, New Zealand
9–11 July 1981
Carpet

Great Britain
4

			1	2	3	4	5
1	(New Zealand) (United Kingdom)	Russell Simpson; Richard Lewis	6; 4	6; 4	4; 6	4; 6	6; 8
2	(New Zealand) (United Kingdom)	Chris Lewis; Buster Mottram	6; 4	4; 6	6; 4	7; 9	3; 6
3	(New Zealand) (United Kingdom)	Chris Lewis / Russell Simpson; Andrew Jarrett / Jonathan Smith	3; 6	4; 6	4; 6
4	(New Zealand) (United Kingdom)	Chris Lewis; Richard Lewis	2; 6	2; 6
5	(New Zealand) (United Kingdom)	Russell Simpson; Jonathan Smith	4; 6	11; 9	6; 2

=== Sweden vs. Australia ===
Sweden
1
Båstad Tennis Stadium, Båstad, Sweden
10–12 July 1981
Clay

Australia
3

			1	2	3	4	5
1	(Sweden) (Australia)	Per Hjertquist; Paul McNamee	3; 6	6; 8	1; 6
2	(Sweden) (Australia)	Mats Wilander; Peter McNamara	4; 6	2; 6	1; 6
3	(Sweden) (Australia)	Anders Järryd / Hans Simonsson; Peter McNamara / Paul McNamee	7; 9	3; 6	8; 6	6; 2	6; 2
4	(Sweden) (Australia)	Mats Wilander; Paul McNamee	6; 1	6; 2	4; 6	0; 6	4; 6
5	(Sweden) (Australia)	Per Hjertquist; Peter McNamara	6; 6					not completed

=== United States vs. Czechoslovakia ===
United States
4
USTA National Tennis Center, New York, NY, United States
9–11 July 1981
Hard

Czechoslovakia
1

			1	2	3	4	5
1	(United States) (Czechoslovakia)	John McEnroe; Ivan Lendl	4; 6	12; 14	5; 7
2	(United States) (Czechoslovakia)	Jimmy Connors; Tomáš Šmíd	6; 3	6; 1	6; 2
3	(United States) (Czechoslovakia)	Bob Lutz / Stan Smith; Ivan Lendl / Tomáš Šmíd	9; 7	6; 3	6; 2
4	(United States) (Czechoslovakia)	John McEnroe; Tomáš Šmíd	6; 3	6; 1	6; 4
5	(United States) (Czechoslovakia)	Jimmy Connors; Ivan Lendl	7; 5	6; 4

== Semifinals ==
=== Argentina vs. Great Britain ===
Argentina
5
Buenos Aires Lawn Tennis Club, Buenos Aires, Argentina
2–4 October 1981
Clay

Great Britain
0

			1	2	3	4	5
1	(Argentina) (United Kingdom)	José Luis Clerc; Richard Lewis	6; 4	6; 4	6; 0
2	(Argentina) (United Kingdom)	Guillermo Vilas; Buster Mottram	6; 3	6; 1	6; 1
3	(Argentina) (United Kingdom)	José Luis Clerc / Guillermo Vilas; Andrew Jarrett / Jonathan Smith	8; 6	8; 6	6; 2
4	(Argentina) (United Kingdom)	José Luis Clerc; Buster Mottram	7; 5	6; 4
5	(Argentina) (United Kingdom)	Guillermo Vilas; Richard Lewis	6; 0	6; 3

=== United States vs. Australia ===
United States
5
Memorial Coliseum, Portland, OR, United States
2–4 October 1981
Carpet (indoors)

Australia
0

			1	2	3	4	5
1	(United States) (Australia)	John McEnroe; Mark Edmondson	6; 3	6; 4	6; 2
2	(United States) (Australia)	Roscoe Tanner; Peter McNamara	6; 4	6; 4	4; 6	3; 6	6; 3
3	(United States) (Australia)	Peter Fleming / John McEnroe; Phil Dent / Peter McNamara	8; 6	6; 4	8; 6
4	(United States) (Australia)	John McEnroe; Peter McNamara	9; 7	6; 0
5	(United States) (Australia)	Roscoe Tanner; Mark Edmondson	4; 6	6; 2	6; 3

== Final ==
=== United States vs. Argentina ===
United States
3
Riverfront Coliseum, Cincinnati, United States
11–13 December 1981
Carpet (indoors)

Argentina
1

			1	2	3	4	5
1	(United States) (Argentina)	John McEnroe; Guillermo Vilas	6; 3	6; 2	6; 2
2	(United States) (Argentina)	Roscoe Tanner; José Luis Clerc	5; 7	3; 6	6; 8
3	(United States) (Argentina)	Peter Fleming / John McEnroe; José Luis Clerc / Guillermo Vilas	6; 3	4; 6	6; 4	4; 6	11; 9
4	(United States) (Argentina)	John McEnroe; José Luis Clerc	7; 5	5; 7	6; 3	3; 6	6; 3
5	(United States) (Argentina)	Roscoe Tanner; Guillermo Vilas	11; 10					not completed

== Relegation play-offs ==
The first-round losers played in the Relegation Play-offs. The winners of the play-offs advanced to the 1982 Davis Cup World Group, and the losers were relegated to their respective Zonal Regions.

=== Results summary ===
Date: 2–4 October

Home team	Score	Visiting team	Location	Surface	Ref.
Brazil	2–3	West Germany	São Paulo	Clay	
Italy	4–1	South Korea	Sanremo	Clay	
France	4–1	Japan	Paris	Clay	
Mexico	3–2	Switzerland	Tijuana	Clay	

- France, Italy, Mexico and West Germany remain in the World Group in 1982.
- Brazil, Japan, South Korea and Switzerland are relegated to Zonal competition in 1982.

=== Brazil vs. West Germany ===
Brazil
2
São Paulo, Brazil
2–4 October 1981
Clay

West Germany
3

			1	2	3	4	5
1	(Brazil) (West Germany)	Thomaz Koch; Ulrich Pinner	3; 6	3; 6	2; 6
2	(Brazil) (West Germany)	Carlos Kirmayr; Peter Elter	7; 5	6; 2	3; 6	6; 2
3	(Brazil) (West Germany)	Marcos Hocevar / Carlos Kirmayr; Hans-Dieter Beutel / Christoph Zipf	8; 6	4; 6	3; 6	11; 13
4	(Brazil) (West Germany)	Carlos Kirmayr; Ulrich Pinner	6; 2	11; 13	21; 19	6; 3
5	(Brazil) (West Germany)	Thomaz Koch; Peter Elter	5; 7	5; 7	3; 6

=== Italy vs. South Korea ===
Italy
4
Sanremo, Italy
2–4 October 1981
Clay

South Korea
1

			1	2	3	4	5
1	(Italy) (South Korea)	Corrado Barazzutti; Lee Woo-ryong	6; 0	6; 2	6; 3
2	(Italy) (South Korea)	Adriano Panatta; Kim Choon-ho	6; 4	6; 4	7; 5
3	(Italy) (South Korea)	Paolo Bertolucci / Adriano Panatta; Kim Choon-ho / Song Dong-wook	6; 2	7; 5	6; 4
4	(Italy) (South Korea)	Corrado Barazzutti; Kim Choon-ho	6; 2	6; 8	2; 6	6; 2	1; 6
5	(Italy) (South Korea)	Gianni Ocleppo; Jeon Chang-dae	6; 3	8; 10	6; 3	6; 4

=== France vs. Japan ===
France
4
Stade Roland Garros, Paris, France
2–4 October 1981
Clay

Japan
1

			1	2	3	4	5
1	(France) (Japan)	Gilles Moretton; Tsuyoshi Fukui	6; 1	6; 4				retired
2	(France) (Japan)	Thierry Tulasne; Shinichi Sakamoto	6; 0	6; 0	6; 0
3	(France) (Japan)	Yannick Noah / Christophe Roger-Vasselin; Tsuyoshi Fukui / Toru Yonezawa	8; 6	6; 2	6; 4
4	(France) (Japan)	Christophe Roger-Vasselin; Shinichi Sakamoto	6; 0	6; 4	6; 1
5	(France) (Japan)	Thierry Tulasne; Tsuyoshi Fukui	6; 1	8; 6	6; 3

=== Mexico vs. Switzerland ===
Mexico
3
Tijuana Country Club, Tijuana, Mexico
2–4 October 1981
Clay

Switzerland
2

			1	2	3	4	5
1	(Mexico) (Switzerland)	Raúl Ramírez; Heinz Günthardt	6; 4	6; 2	6; 1
2	(Mexico) (Switzerland)	Jorge Lozano; Roland Stadler	4; 6	6; 4	4; 6	5; 7
3	(Mexico) (Switzerland)	Jorge Lozano / Raúl Ramírez; Heinz Günthardt / Markus Günthardt	3; 6	6; 2	6; 0	6; 1
4	(Mexico) (Switzerland)	Raúl Ramírez; Roland Stadler	6; 1	6; 2	6; 3
5	(Mexico) (Switzerland)	Juan Hernández; Ivan Dupasquier	4; 6	4; 6
