= 1980 Davis Cup Eastern Zone =

International tennis competition

The Eastern Zone was one of the three regional zones of the 1980 Davis Cup.

10 teams entered the Eastern Zone, with 6 teams competing in the preliminary round to join the previous year's semifinalists in the main draw. Japan and India received byes into the quarterfinals, while Australia and New Zealand received byes into the semifinals. The winner of the main draw went on to compete in the Inter-Zonal Zone against the winners of the Americas Zone and Europe Zone.

Australia defeated New Zealand in the final and progressed to the Inter-Zonal Zone.

== Preliminary rounds ==
=== Draw ===
Pre-qualifying round 6–8 October 1979
Chinese Taipei
bye
Philippines
Thailand	w/o
Seoul, South Korea
South Korea	3
Pakistan	2
bye
Indonesia

Preliminary Round; 31 October–11 November 1979
Guam (hard)
Chinese Taipei	3
Thailand	2
Seoul, South Korea
South Korea	5
Indonesia	0

=== First round ===
South Korea vs. Pakistan

South Korea
3
Seoul, South Korea
6–8 October 1979

Pakistan
2

			1	2	3	4	5
1	(South Korea) (Pakistan)	Kim Bong-suk; Saeed Meer	0; 6	4; 6	2; 6
2	(South Korea) (Pakistan)	Jeon Chang-dae; Nadir Ali Khan	6; 0	6; 2	6; 3
3	(South Korea) (Pakistan)	Jeon Chang-dae / Jeon Young-dai; Nadir Ali Khan / Saeed Meer	6; 2	4; 6	6; 2	3; 6	2; 6
4	(South Korea) (Pakistan)	Jeon Young-dai; Nadir Ali Khan	6; 3	6; 1	6; 3
5	(South Korea) (Pakistan)	Jeon Chang-dae; Saeed Meer	6; 1	6; 3	6; 2

=== Qualifying round ===
Chinese Taipei vs. Thailand

Chinese Taipei
3
Guam
31 October–2 November 1979
Hard

Thailand
2

			1	2	3	4	5
1	(Chinese Taipei) (Thailand)	Wu Chang-rung; Supot Meesawat	2; 6	6; 3	4; 6	6; 2	7; 5
2	(Chinese Taipei) (Thailand)	Hsu Huang-jung; Panomkorn Pladchurnil	6; 3	1; 6	7; 5	6; 4
3	(Chinese Taipei) (Thailand)	Hsu Huang-jung / Wu Chang-rung; Supot Meesawat / Panomkorn Pladchurnil	8; 6	11; 9	3; 6	3; 6	6; 8
4	(Chinese Taipei) (Thailand)	Wu Chang-rung; Panomkorn Pladchurnil	6; 2	5; 7	5; 7	12; 10	4; 6
5	(Chinese Taipei) (Thailand)	Hsu Huang-jung; Supot Meesawat	6; 1	2; 6	6; 3	6; 3

South Korea vs. Indonesia

South Korea
5
Seoul, South Korea
9–11 November 1979

Indonesia
0

			1	2	3	4	5
1	(South Korea) (Indonesia)	Jeon Chang-dae; Yustedjo Tarik	6; 3	6; 0	6; 3
2	(South Korea) (Indonesia)	Kim Choon-ho; Atet Wijono	6; 4	6; 3	6; 2
3	(South Korea) (Indonesia)	Jeon Young-dai / Kim Choon-ho; Gondo Widjojo / Atet Wijono	6; 4	4; 6	8; 6	3; 6	6; 4
4	(South Korea) (Indonesia)	Kim Choon-ho; Yustedjo Tarik	6; 4	6; 4	6; 0
5	(South Korea) (Indonesia)	Jeon Chang-dae; Hadiman	6; 1	6; 1	7; 5

== Main draw ==
=== Draw ===
Quarterfinals; 7–10 December 1979
Australia
bye
Taipei, Taiwan (indoor hard)
Japan	5
Chinese Taipei	0
Seoul, South Korea
South Korea	3
India	2
bye
New Zealand

Semifinals; 8–10 February
Hobart, Australia (carpet)
Australia	5
Japan	0
Christchurch, New Zealand (grass)
South Korea	0
New Zealand	5

Final; 7–9 March
Brisbane, Australia (grass)
Australia	3
New Zealand	1

=== Quarterfinals ===
Chinese Taipei vs. Japan

Chinese Taipei
0
Taipei, Taiwan
7–10 December 1979
Hard (indoors)

Japan
5

			1	2	3	4	5
1	(Chinese Taipei) (Japan)	Wu Chang-rung; Shigeyuki Nishio	7; 5	0; 6	3; 6	3; 6
2	(Chinese Taipei) (Japan)	Hsu Huang-jung; Tsuyoshi Fukui	4; 6	2; 6	1; 6
3	(Chinese Taipei) (Japan)	Hsu Huang-jung / Wu Chang-rung; Jun Kamiwazumi / Shinichi Sakamoto	2; 6	2; 6	4; 6
4	(Chinese Taipei) (Japan)	Hsu Huang-jung; Shigeyuki Nishio	2; 6	4; 6	8; 10
5	(Chinese Taipei) (Japan)	Wu Chang-rung; Tsuyoshi Fukui	2; 6	3; 6	4; 6

South Korea vs. India

South Korea
3
Seoul, South Korea
7–9 December 1979

India
2

			1	2	3	4	5
1	(South Korea) (India)	Jeon Chang-dae; Harishanker Krishnan	6; 4	6; 3	6; 2
2	(South Korea) (India)	Kim Choon-ho; Nandan Bal	2; 6	6; 3	4; 6	3; 6
3	(South Korea) (India)	Jeon Young-dai / Kim Choon-ho; Nandan Bal / Sashi Menon	2; 6	6; 8	4; 6
4	(South Korea) (India)	Kim Choon-ho; Harishanker Krishnan	6; 4	8; 6	6; 1
5	(South Korea) (India)	Jeon Young-dai; Nandan Bal	5; 7	6; 3	6; 2	6; 1

=== Semifinals ===
Australia vs. Japan

Australia
5
Domain Centre, Hobart, Australia
8–10 February 1980
Carpet

Japan
0

			1	2	3	4	5
1	(Australia) (Japan)	Mark Edmondson; Tsuyoshi Fukui	6; 2	6; 3	4; 6	6; 3
2	(Australia) (Japan)	Peter McNamara; Shigeyuki Nishio	6; 4	6; 3	6; 0
3	(Australia) (Japan)	Brad Drewett / Mark Edmondson; Jun Kamiwazumi / Shinichi Sakamoto	8; 6	6; 1	6; 2
4	(Australia) (Japan)	Peter McNamara; Tsuyoshi Fukui	7; 5	6; 0	6; 3
5	(Australia) (Japan)	Mark Edmondson; Shigeyuki Nishio	2; 6	6; 0	6; 2	6; 1

New Zealand vs. South Korea

New Zealand
5
Wilding Park, Christchurch, New Zealand
8–10 February 1980
Grass

South Korea
0

			1	2	3	4	5
1	(New Zealand) (South Korea)	Onny Parun; Kim Choon-ho	7; 5	3; 6	6; 2	10; 8
2	(New Zealand) (South Korea)	Chris Lewis; Jeon Young-dai	6; 2	6; 4	6; 0
3	(New Zealand) (South Korea)	Chris Lewis / Russell Simpson; Kim Bong-suk / Kim Choon-ho	6; 1	6; 0	7; 5
4	(New Zealand) (South Korea)	Chris Lewis; Jeon Chang-dae	6; 3	6; 2	6; 0
5	(New Zealand) (South Korea)	Onny Parun; Kim Bong-suk	6; 4	6; 3	6; 1

=== Final ===
Australia vs. New Zealand

Australia
3
Milton Courts, Brisbane, Australia
7–9 March 1980
Grass

New Zealand
1

			1	2	3	4	5
1	(Australia) (New Zealand)	John Alexander; Chris Lewis	7; 5	7; 9	10; 8	4; 6	5; 7
2	(Australia) (New Zealand)	Phil Dent; Onny Parun	6; 2	5; 7	6; 3	3; 6	6; 2
3	(Australia) (New Zealand)	John Alexander / Phil Dent; Chris Lewis / Russell Simpson	6; 2	8; 6	9; 7
4	(Australia) (New Zealand)	Phil Dent; Chris Lewis	6; 4	6; 3	6; 2
5	(Australia) (New Zealand)	John Alexander; Onny Parun						not played
