= 1981 Davis Cup =

1981 edition of the Davis Cup

Details
- Duration: 6 March – 13 December 1981
- Edition: 70th
- Teams: 51

Champion
- Winning nation: United States

The 1981 Davis Cup (also known as the 1981 Davis Cup by NEC for sponsorship purposes) was the 70th edition of the Davis Cup, the most important tournament between national teams in men's tennis. 53 teams would enter the competition, 16 in the World Group, 23 in the Europe Zone, 8 in the Americas Zone, and 6 in the Eastern Zone.

The United States defeated Argentina in the final, held at the Riverfront Coliseum in Cincinnati, Ohio, United States on 11–13 December, to win their 27th title overall.

== Format changes ==
The 1981 tournament marked the introduction of the 16-team World Group and a move to a tiered system including promotion and relegation. The original 16 teams to compete were chosen through the previous year's results, with teams that reached the Zonal semifinals chosen to compete in the inaugural bracket. Teams which lost in the World Group first round would now compete against each other in the World Group Relegation Play-off, with the four losers relegated to their respective Zonal competition the following year. The four winners of the Zonal competitions would now earn promotion into the following year's World Group to replace the relegated teams.

The 16 qualifying teams for the first World Group were: from the 1980 Americas Zone, the North & Central America Zone finalists the United States and Mexico, and the South America Zone finalists Argentina and Brazil; the 1980 Eastern Zone semifinalists Australia, Japan, New Zealand and South Korea; and the semifinalists from the two Europe Zones Czechoslovakia, Great Britain, France, Italy, Romania, Sweden, Switzerland and West Germany.

This year also marked the first year of commercial sponsorship, when Japanese electronics company NEC became the tournament's first Title Sponsor, a partnership that lasted 21 years in total. NEC's partnership also enabled prize money to be given for the first time, with the World Group team competing for a total of US$1 million.

== World Group ==
Participating teams
Argentina	Australia	Brazil	Czechoslovakia
France	Great Britain	Italy	Japan
Mexico	New Zealand	Romania	South Korea
Sweden	Switzerland	United States	West Germany

=== Draw ===
First round 6–8 March
Munich, West Germany (indoor carpet)
West Germany	2
Argentina	3
Timișoara, Romania (indoor hard)
Romania	3
Brazil	2
Brighton, United Kingdom (indoor carpet)
Great Britain	3
Italy	2
Seoul, South Korea (clay)
South Korea	0
New Zealand	5
Yokohama, Japan (indoor carpet)
Japan	0
Sweden	5
Lyon, France (indoor carpet)
France	2
Australia	3
Zürich, Switzerland (indoor hard)
Switzerland	2
Czechoslovakia	3
Carlsbad, CA, United States (hard)
United States	3
Mexico	2

Quarterfinals; 9–12 July
Timișoara, Romania (hard)
Argentina	3
Romania	2
Christchurch, New Zealand (carpet)
Great Britain	4
New Zealand	1
Båstad, Sweden (clay)
Sweden	1
Australia	3
New York City, United States (hard)
Czechoslovakia	1
United States	4

Semifinals; 2–4 October
Buenos Aires, Argentina (clay)
Argentina	5
Great Britain	0
Portland, OR, United States (indoor carpet)
Australia	0
United States	5

Final; 11–13 December
Cincinnati, OH, United States (indoor carpet)
Argentina	1
United States	3

=== Final ===
United States vs. Argentina

United States
3
Riverfront Coliseum, Cincinnati, United States
11–13 December 1981
Carpet (indoors)

Argentina
1

			1	2	3	4	5
1	(United States) (Argentina)	John McEnroe; Guillermo Vilas	6; 3	6; 2	6; 2
2	(United States) (Argentina)	Roscoe Tanner; José Luis Clerc	5; 7	3; 6	6; 8
3	(United States) (Argentina)	Peter Fleming / John McEnroe; José Luis Clerc / Guillermo Vilas	6; 3	4; 6	6; 4	4; 6	11; 9
4	(United States) (Argentina)	John McEnroe; José Luis Clerc	7; 5	5; 7	6; 3	3; 6	6; 3
5	(United States) (Argentina)	Roscoe Tanner; Guillermo Vilas	11; 10					not completed

=== Relegation play-offs ===
Date: 2–4 October

Home team	Score	Visiting team	Location	Surface
Brazil	2–3	West Germany	São Paulo	Clay
Italy	4–1	South Korea	Sanremo	Clay
France	4–1	Japan	Paris	Clay
Mexico	3–2	Switzerland	Tijuana	Clay

- France, Italy, Mexico and West Germany remain in the World Group in 1982.
- Brazil, Japan, South Korea and Switzerland are relegated to Zonal competition in 1982.

== Americas Zone ==
Sub-Zonal Semifinals; 9–11 January
Bogotá, Colombia (clay)
Colombia	3
Canada	2
Caracas, Venezuela (hard)
Venezuela	4
Caribbean/West Indies	1
Lima, Peru (clay)
Peru	1
Chile	4
Guayaquil, Ecuador (clay)
Ecuador	2
Uruguay	3

Sub-Zonal Finals; 13–15 February
Bogotá, Colombia (clay)
Colombia	5
Venezuela	0
Santiago, Chile (clay)
Chile	5
Uruguay	0

Inter-Zonal Final; 6–8 March
Bogotá, Colombia (indoor clay)
Colombia	2
Chile	3

- Chile are promoted to the World Group in 1982.

== Eastern Zone ==
Quarterfinals; 9–11 January
India
bye
Bangkok, Thailand (hard)
Malaysia	0
Thailand	5
Taipei, Taiwan (indoor hard)
Indonesia	4
Chinese Taipei	1
bye
Pakistan

Semifinals; 13–15 February
Bangkok, Thailand (hard)
India	5
Thailand	0
Jakarta, Indonesia (clay)
Indonesia	3
Pakistan	0

Final; 6–8 March
Jakarta, Indonesia (clay)
India	3
Indonesia	2

- India are promoted to the World Group in 1982.

== Europe Zone ==
=== Zone A ===
First round 8–10 May
Spain
bye
Zimbabwe
Algeria	w/o
Poland
bye
Monte Carlo, Monaco (clay)
Morocco	1
Monaco	3
Hungary
bye
Cairo, Egypt (clay)
Egypt	5
Greece	0
Yugoslavia
bye
bye
Israel

Quarterfinals; 10–14 June
Algiers, Algeria (clay)
Spain	5
Algeria	0
Monte Carlo, Monaco (clay)
Poland	2
Monaco	3
Cairo, Egypt (clay)
Hungary	4
Egypt	1
Skopje, Yugoslavia (clay)
Yugoslavia	1
Israel	4

Semifinals; 9–11 July
Lleida, Spain (clay)
Spain	5
Monaco	0
Ramat HaSharon, Israel (hard)
Hungary	3
Israel	2

Final; 25–27 September
Avilés, Spain (clay)
Spain	3
Hungary	2

- Spain are promoted to the World Group in 1982.

=== Zone B ===
First round 8–10 May
Austria
bye
Aarhus, Denmark (clay)
Denmark	5
Portugal	0
Soviet Union
bye
Belgium	w/o
Turkey
Finland
bye
Mondorf-les-Bains, Luxembourg (clay)
Luxembourg	0
Bulgaria	5
Netherlands
bye
Oslo, Norway (clay)
Norway	2
Ireland	3

Quarterfinals; 12–14 June
Salzburg, Austria (clay)
Austria	3
Denmark	2
Jūrmala, Soviet Union (clay)
Soviet Union	4
Belgium	1
Helsinki, Finland (clay)
Finland	3
Bulgaria	2
Eindhoven, Netherlands (clay)
Netherlands	4
Ireland	1

Semifinals; 9–11 July
Pörtschach, Austria (clay)
Austria	0
Soviet Union	4
Helsinki, Finland (clay)
Finland	0
Netherlands	5

Final; 25–27 September
Jūrmala, Soviet Union (clay)
Soviet Union	5
Netherlands	0

- Soviet Union are promoted to the World Group in 1982.
