= 1979 Davis Cup =

1979 edition of the Davis Cup

Details
- Duration: August 1978 – 16 December 1979
- Edition: 68th
- Teams: 49

Champion
- Winning nation: United States

The 1979 Davis Cup was the 68th edition of the Davis Cup, the most important tournament between national teams in men's tennis. 52 teams would enter the competition, 29 in the Europe Zone, 13 in the Americas Zone, and 10 in the Eastern Zone.

Following years of protests from various national sides, South Africa were expelled from the Davis Cup for failing to abandon its apartheid policies. For many years the Davis Cup organisers had been reluctant to let political issues affect the competition, however following several years of defaults by national teams and threats of a boycott, the organisers of the tournament were forced to resolve the political disagreements by expelling the South African side. Canada, Mexico, Venezuela and the Caribbean/West Indies teams had all pulled out of the 1978 tournament, and in 1977 the United States, Great Britain and France had all withdrawn in protest to the continued politicisation of the Cup before eventually re-entering following concessions. South Africa would not be allowed to participate again in the Davis Cup until 1992, when significant progress had been made to bring about the end of apartheid.

The United States defeated Argentina in the Americas Inter-Zonal final, Australia defeated New Zealand in the Eastern Zone final, and Italy and Czechoslovakia were the winners of the two Europe Zones, defeating Great Britain and Sweden respectively.

In the Inter-Zonal Zone, the United States defeated Australia and Italy defeated Czechoslovakia in the semifinals. The United States then defeated Italy in the final to win their 26th title overall and their second consecutive title. The final was held at the Civic Auditorium in San Francisco, United States on 14–16 December.

== Americas Zone ==
=== North & Central America Zone ===
==== Preliminary rounds ====
First Round
Mexico
bye
bye
Canada
Colombia
bye
Nassau, Bahamas
Caribbean/West Indies	2
Venezuela	3

Qualifying Round
Mexico City, Mexico (clay)
Mexico	3
Canada	2
Bogotá, Colombia
Colombia	4
Venezuela	1

==== Main Draw ====
Semifinals; 8–10 December 1978
United States
bye
Mexico City, Mexico (clay)
Mexico	2
Colombia	3

Final; 16–18 March
Cleveland, Ohio, United States (indoor hard)
United States	5
Colombia	0

=== South America Zone ===
==== Preliminary rounds ====
First Round
Argentina
bye
Guayaquil, Ecuador (indoor carpet)
Ecuador	4
Peru	1
Cochabamba, Bolivia (clay)
Bolivia	0
Brazil	5
bye
Uruguay

Qualifying Round
Guayaquil, Ecuador (indoor carpet)
Argentina	4
Ecuador	1
Itu, Brazil
Brazil	4
Uruguay	0

==== Main Draw ====
Semifinals; 8–10 December 1978
Buenos Aires, Argentina (clay)
Argentina	5
Brazil	0
bye
Chile

Final; 16–18 March
Buenos Aires, Argentina (clay)
Argentina	3
Chile	2

=== Americas Inter-Zonal Final ===
United States vs. Argentina

United States
4
Racquet Club of Memphis, Memphis, Tennessee, United States
14–16 September 1979
Carpet (indoors)

Argentina
1

			1	2	3	4	5
1	(United States) (Argentina)	Vitas Gerulaitis; José Luis Clerc	6; 1	7; 5	6; 1
2	(United States) (Argentina)	John McEnroe; Guillermo Vilas	6; 2	6; 3	6; 2
3	(United States) (Argentina)	Bob Lutz / Stan Smith; José Luis Clerc / Guillermo Vilas	2; 6	4; 6	11; 9	6; 4	6; 1
4	(United States) (Argentina)	John McEnroe; José Luis Clerc	6; 2	6; 3
5	(United States) (Argentina)	Vitas Gerulaitis; Guillermo Vilas	7; 9	3; 0				retired

== Eastern Zone ==
=== Preliminary rounds ===
Pre-qualifying round
Philippines
bye
Peshawar, Pakistan
Pakistan	3
South Korea	2
Chinese Taipei	w/o
Malaysia
bye
Indonesia

Preliminary round
Philippines
Pakistan	w/o
Jakarta, Indonesia
Chinese Taipei	0
Indonesia	4

=== Main Draw ===
Quarterfinals; 5–10 December 1978
New Zealand
bye
Kasuga, Japan
Japan	4
Pakistan	1
Ahmedabad, India
Indonesia	1
India	4
bye
Australia

Semifinals; 9–12 February
Christchurch, New Zealand (grass)
New Zealand	3
Japan	0
Madras, India (clay)
India	2
Australia	3

Final; 16–19 March
Christchurch, New Zealand (grass)
New Zealand	2
Australia	3

==== Final ====
New Zealand vs. Australia

New Zealand
2
Wilding Park, Christchurch, New Zealand
16–19 March 1979
Grass

Australia
3

			1	2	3	4	5
1	(New Zealand) (Australia)	Onny Parun; Mark Edmondson	3; 6	6; 3	6; 3	6; 2
2	(New Zealand) (Australia)	Russell Simpson; John Alexander	4; 6	6; 4	5; 7	4; 6
3	(New Zealand) (Australia)	Onny Parun / Russell Simpson; John Alexander / Phil Dent	4; 6	7; 9	3; 6
4	(New Zealand) (Australia)	Russell Simpson; Mark Edmondson	3; 6	2; 6	4; 6
5	(New Zealand) (Australia)	Onny Parun; John Alexander	7; 5	6; 3	6; 3

== Europe Zone ==
=== Zone A ===
==== Preliminary rounds ====
First Round
Poland
bye
Helsinki, Finland
Finland	5
Morocco	0
Italy
bye
Athens, Greece (clay)
Greece	1
Denmark	4
Austria
bye
Cairo, Egypt (clay)
Egypt	5
Portugal	0
Spain
bye
Monte Carlo, Monaco
Monaco	1
Soviet Union	4

Qualifying Round
Warsaw, Poland
Poland	4
Finland	1
Palermo, Italy (clay)
Italy	5
Denmark	0
Vienna, Austria
Austria	5
Egypt	0
Barcelona, Spain
Spain	5
Soviet Union	0

==== Main Draw ====
Quarterfinals; 15–17 June
Hungary
bye
Warsaw, Poland
Poland	1
Italy	4
Vienna, Austria
Austria	1
Spain	3
bye
Great Britain

Semifinals; 13–15 July
Rome, Italy (clay)
Hungary	2
Italy	3
Eastbourne, United Kingdom (grass)
Spain	1
Great Britain	4

Final; 14–16 September
Rome, Italy (clay)
Italy	4
Great Britain	1

==== Final ====
Italy vs. Great Britain

Italy
4
Foro Italico, Rome, Italy
14–16 September 1979
Clay

Great Britain
1

			1	2	3	4	5
1	(Italy) (United Kingdom)	Adriano Panatta; Buster Mottram	0; 6	4; 6	4; 6
2	(Italy) (United Kingdom)	Corrado Barazzutti; John Lloyd	6; 1	6; 4	6; 4
3	(Italy) (United Kingdom)	Corrado Barazzutti / Antonio Zugarelli; Mark Cox / David Lloyd	7; 5	10; 8	6; 1
4	(Italy) (United Kingdom)	Adriano Panatta; John Lloyd	6; 3	6; 2	6; 3
5	(Italy) (United Kingdom)	Corrado Barazzutti; Buster Mottram	8; 6	7; 5

=== Zone B ===
==== Pre-qualifying round ====
Pre-qualifying round
Ankara, Turkey
Turkey	0
Iran	5

==== Preliminary rounds ====
First Round
Amersfoort, Netherlands (clay)
Netherlands	4
Norway	1
bye
France
Geneva, Switzerland
Switzerland	3
Iran	2
bye
Yugoslavia
Israel	w/o
Nigeria
bye
West Germany
Brussels, Belgium
Belgium	5
Ireland	0
bye
Romania

Qualifying Round
Amsterdam, Netherlands (indoor carpet)
Netherlands	2
France	3
Zürich, Switzerland
Switzerland	4
Yugoslavia	1
Augsburg, West Germany
Israel	2
West Germany	3
Brussels, Belgium
Belgium	1
Romania	4

==== Main Draw ====
Quarterfinals; 15–17 June
Czechoslovakia
bye
Paris, France (clay)
France	5
Switzerland	0
Bucharest, Romania (clay)
Romania	4
West Germany	1
bye
Sweden

Semifinals; 13–15 July
Paris, France (clay)
Czechoslovakia	4
France	1
Bucharest, Romania (clay)
Romania	2
Sweden	3

Final; 14–16 September
Prague, Czechoslovakia (clay)
Czechoslovakia	3
Sweden	2

==== Final ====
Czechoslovakia vs. Sweden

Czechoslovakia
3
Štvanice Stadium, Prague, Czechoslovakia
14–16 September 1979
Clay

Sweden
2

			1	2	3	4	5
1	(Czechoslovakia) (Sweden)	Tomáš Šmíd; Kjell Johansson	6; 4	6; 3	6; 2
2	(Czechoslovakia) (Sweden)	Ivan Lendl; Björn Borg	4; 6	5; 7	2; 6
3	(Czechoslovakia) (Sweden)	Jan Kodeš / Tomáš Šmíd; Ove Bengtson / Björn Borg	2; 6	6; 3	6; 4	6; 0
4	(Czechoslovakia) (Sweden)	Ivan Lendl; Kjell Johansson	8; 10	6; 4	6; 4	4; 6	6; 1
5	(Czechoslovakia) (Sweden)	Tomáš Šmíd; Per Hjertquist	3; 5					retired

== Inter-Zonal Zone ==
=== Draw ===
Semifinals; 5–8 October
Sydney, Australia (grass)
AME	United States	4
EAS	Australia	1
Rome, Italy (clay)
EUR-B	Czechoslovakia	1
EUR-A	Italy	4

Final; 14–16 December
San Francisco, United States (indoor carpet)
AME	United States	5
EUR-A	Italy	0

=== Semifinals ===
Australia vs. United States

Australia
1
White City Stadium, Sydney, Australia
5–8 October 1979
Grass

United States
4

			1	2	3	4	5
1	(Australia) (United States)	Mark Edmondson; Vitas Gerulaitis	8; 6	16; 14	8; 10	3; 6	3; 6
2	(Australia) (United States)	John Alexander; John McEnroe	7; 9	2; 6	7; 9
3	(Australia) (United States)	John Alexander / Phil Dent; Bob Lutz / Stan Smith	9; 7	6; 4	6; 4
4	(Australia) (United States)	John Alexander; Vitas Gerulaitis	7; 5	4; 6	6; 8	2; 6
5	(Australia) (United States)	Mark Edmondson; John McEnroe	3; 6	4; 6

Italy vs. Czechoslovakia

Italy
4
Foro Italico, Rome, Italy
5–7 October 1979
Clay

Czechoslovakia
1

			1	2	3	4	5
1	(Italy) (Czechoslovakia)	Corrado Barazzutti; Tomáš Šmíd	1; 6	6; 3	1; 6	6; 3	5; 7
2	(Italy) (Czechoslovakia)	Adriano Panatta; Ivan Lendl	6; 4	1; 6	6; 0	6; 0
3	(Italy) (Czechoslovakia)	Paolo Bertolucci / Adriano Panatta; Jan Kodeš / Tomáš Šmíd	6; 8	6; 2	6; 1	6; 2
4	(Italy) (Czechoslovakia)	Corrado Barazzutti; Ivan Lendl	4; 6	6; 1	6; 2	3; 6	7; 5
5	(Italy) (Czechoslovakia)	Adriano Panatta; Tomáš Šmíd	6; 3	6; 2

=== Final ===
United States vs. Italy

United States
5
Civic Auditorium, San Francisco, United States
14–16 December 1979
Carpet (indoors)

Italy
0

			1	2	3	4	5
1	(United States) (Italy)	Vitas Gerulaitis; Corrado Barazzutti	6; 2	3; 2				retired
2	(United States) (Italy)	John McEnroe; Adriano Panatta	6; 2	6; 3	6; 4
3	(United States) (Italy)	Bob Lutz / Stan Smith; Paolo Bertolucci / Adriano Panatta	6; 4	12; 10	6; 2
4	(United States) (Italy)	John McEnroe; Antonio Zugarelli	6; 4	6; 3	6; 1
5	(United States) (Italy)	Vitas Gerulaitis; Adriano Panatta	6; 1	6; 3	6; 3
