= 1984 Davis Cup World Group =

- Date: 24 February – 18 December
- Edition: 4th

Champions
- Sweden
- Davis Cup

The World Group was the highest level of Davis Cup competition in 1984.

Australia were the defending champions, but were eliminated in the semifinals.

Sweden won the title, defeating the United States in the final, 4–1. The final was held at the Scandinavium in Gothenburg, Sweden, from 16 to 18 December. It was the Swedish team's first Davis Cup title since 1975 and their 2nd Davis Cup title overall.

== Participating teams ==
Participating teams
Argentina	Australia	Czechoslovakia	Denmark
Ecuador	France	Great Britain	India
Italy	New Zealand	Paraguay	Romania
Sweden	United States	West Germany	Yugoslavia

=== Draw ===
First round 24–26 February
Perth, Australia (grass)
Australia	5
Yugoslavia	0
Telford, United Kingdom (indoor carpet)
Italy	3
Great Britain	2
Stuttgart, West Germany (indoor carpet)
Argentina	4
West Germany	1
Bucharest, Romania (indoor carpet)
United States	5
Romania	0
Hradec Králové, Czechoslovakia (indoor carpet)
Denmark	0
Czechoslovakia	5
New Delhi, India (grass)
India	1
France	4
Christchurch, New Zealand (grass)
Paraguay	3
New Zealand	2
Norrköping, Sweden (indoor carpet)
Ecuador	1
Sweden	4

Quarterfinals; 13–15 July
Brisbane, Australia (grass)
Australia	5
Italy	0
Atlanta, GA, United States (indoor carpet)
Argentina	0
United States	5
Hradec Králové, Czechoslovakia (indoor carpet)
Czechoslovakia	3
France	2
Båstad, Sweden (clay)
Paraguay	1
Sweden	4

Semifinals; 28–30 September
Portland, OR, United States (indoor carpet)
Australia	1
United States	4
Båstad, Sweden (clay)
Czechoslovakia	0
Sweden	5

Final; 16–18 December
Gothenburg, Sweden (indoor clay)
United States	1
Sweden	4

== First round ==
=== Australia vs. Yugoslavia ===
Australia
5
Royal King's Park Tennis Club, Perth, Australia
24–26 February 1984
Grass

Yugoslavia
0

			1	2	3	4	5
1	(Australia) (Socialist Federal Republic of Yugoslavia)	Paul McNamee; Slobodan Živojinović	9; 7	4; 6	9; 7	10; 8
2	(Australia) (Socialist Federal Republic of Yugoslavia)	John Fitzgerald; Marko Ostoja	2; 6	7; 5	6; 1	6; 2
3	(Australia) (Socialist Federal Republic of Yugoslavia)	Mark Edmondson / Paul McNamee; Marko Ostoja / Slobodan Živojinović	6; 4	6; 1	6; 4
4	(Australia) (Socialist Federal Republic of Yugoslavia)	John Fitzgerald; Bruno Orešar	6; 3	6; 4
5	(Australia) (Socialist Federal Republic of Yugoslavia)	Paul McNamee; Branko Horvat	6; 4	10; 8

=== Great Britain vs. Italy ===
Great Britain
2
Racquet Centre, Telford, United Kingdom
24–26 February 1984
Carpet (indoors)

Italy
3

			1	2	3	4	5
1	(United Kingdom) (Italy)	Colin Dowdeswell; Gianni Ocleppo	6; 1	2; 6	7; 9	2; 6
2	(United Kingdom) (Italy)	John Lloyd; Corrado Barazzutti	6; 4	3; 6	6; 2	6; 3
3	(United Kingdom) (Italy)	Colin Dowdeswell / John Lloyd; Gianni Ocleppo / Claudio Panatta	11; 9	6; 4	3; 6	3; 6	6; 3
4	(United Kingdom) (Italy)	John Lloyd; Gianni Ocleppo	6; 2	2; 6	3; 6	3; 6
5	(United Kingdom) (Italy)	Colin Dowdeswell; Corrado Barazzutti	1; 6	6; 0	3; 6	5; 7

=== West Germany vs. Argentina ===
West Germany
1
Schleyer-Halle, Stuttgart, West Germany
24–26 February 1984
Carpet (indoors)

Argentina
4

			1	2	3	4	5
1	(West Germany) (Argentina)	Hans-Dieter Beutel; Guillermo Vilas	6; 8	6; 8	5; 7
2	(West Germany) (Argentina)	Michael Westphal; José Luis Clerc	3; 6	6; 3	3; 6	6; 1	6; 8
3	(West Germany) (Argentina)	Hans-Dieter Beutel / Andreas Maurer; José Luis Clerc / Guillermo Vilas	11; 13	4; 6	3; 6
4	(West Germany) (Argentina)	Hans-Dieter Beutel; José Luis Clerc	5; 7	5; 7
5	(West Germany) (Argentina)	Michael Westphal; Guillermo Vilas	6; 3	6; 4

=== Romania vs. United States ===
Romania
0
Sports Palace, Bucharest, Romania
24–26 February 1984
Carpet (indoors)

United States
5

			1	2	3	4	5
1	(Romania) (United States)	Florin Segărceanu; Jimmy Connors	2; 6	3; 6	4; 6
2	(Romania) (United States)	Ilie Năstase; John McEnroe	2; 6	4; 6	2; 6
3	(Romania) (United States)	Ilie Năstase / Florin Segărceanu; Peter Fleming / John McEnroe	3; 6	4; 6	4; 6
4	(Romania) (United States)	Ilie Năstase; Jimmy Connors	4; 6	4; 6
5	(Romania) (United States)	Florin Segărceanu; John McEnroe	6; 2	2; 6	2; 6

=== Czechoslovakia vs. Denmark ===
Czechoslovakia
5
Hradec Králové, Czechoslovakia
24–26 February 1984
Carpet (indoors)

Denmark
0

			1	2	3	4	5
1	(Czechoslovakia) (Denmark)	Libor Pimek; Michael Mortensen	10; 8	6; 2	6; 4
2	(Czechoslovakia) (Denmark)	Tomáš Šmíd; Peter Bastiansen	6; 2	6; 1	6; 2
3	(Czechoslovakia) (Denmark)	Pavel Složil / Tomáš Šmíd; Peter Bastiansen / Michael Mortensen	6; 4	6; 3	12; 10
4	(Czechoslovakia) (Denmark)	Libor Pimek; Peter Bastiansen	6; 4	4; 6	6; 4
5	(Czechoslovakia) (Denmark)	Tomáš Šmíd; Michael Mortensen	8; 6	6; 3

=== India vs. France ===
India
1
Delhi LTA Complex, New Delhi, India
24–26 February 1984
Grass

France
4

			1	2	3	4	5
1	(India) (France)	Ramesh Krishnan; Yannick Noah	2; 6	5; 7	2; 6
2	(India) (France)	Anand Amritraj; Henri Leconte	6; 2	2; 6	3; 6	6; 8
3	(India) (France)	Anand Amritraj / Sashi Menon; Henri Leconte / Yannick Noah	5; 7	4; 6	4; 6
4	(India) (France)	Anand Amritraj; Yannick Noah	4; 6	4; 6
5	(India) (France)	Sashi Menon; Henri Leconte	6; 2	5; 7	10; 8

=== New Zealand vs. Paraguay ===
New Zealand
2
Wilding Park, Christchurch, New Zealand
24–26 February 1984
Grass

Paraguay
3

			1	2	3	4	5
1	(New Zealand) (Paraguay)	Russell Simpson; Francisco González	1; 6	3; 6	8; 6	6; 2	4; 6
2	(New Zealand) (Paraguay)	Chris Lewis; Víctor Pecci	6; 4	6; 8	4; 6	6; 2	4; 6
3	(New Zealand) (Paraguay)	Chris Lewis / Russell Simpson; Francisco González / Víctor Pecci	3; 6	10; 8	2; 6	4; 6
4	(New Zealand) (Paraguay)	Chris Lewis; Francisco González	6; 3	6; 4
5	(New Zealand) (Paraguay)	Russell Simpson; Víctor Pecci	6; 3	6; 3

=== Sweden vs. Ecuador ===
Sweden
4
Himmelstalundshallen, Norrköping, Sweden
24–26 February 1984
Carpet (indoors)

Ecuador
1

			1	2	3	4	5
1	(Sweden) (Ecuador)	Anders Järryd; Andrés Gómez	1; 6	6; 2	6; 8	6; 3	3; 6
2	(Sweden) (Ecuador)	Mats Wilander; Ricardo Ycaza	6; 3	6; 2	6; 1
3	(Sweden) (Ecuador)	Anders Järryd / Mats Wilander; Andrés Gómez / Ricardo Ycaza	3; 6	6; 3	6; 4	6; 4
4	(Sweden) (Ecuador)	Joakim Nyström; Ricardo Ycaza	6; 2	6; 0	6; 3
5	(Sweden) (Ecuador)	Mats Wilander; Andrés Gómez	7; 5	6; 4

== Quarterfinals ==
=== Australia vs. Italy ===
Australia
5
Milton Courts, Brisbane, Australia
13–15 July 1984
Grass

Italy
0

			1	2	3	4	5
1	(Australia) (Italy)	John Fitzgerald; Gianni Ocleppo	6; 3	6; 1	4; 6	6; 1
2	(Australia) (Italy)	Pat Cash; Claudio Panatta	6; 3	3; 6	6; 3	6; 4
3	(Australia) (Italy)	Mark Edmondson / Paul McNamee; Gianni Ocleppo / Claudio Panatta	3; 6	7; 5	6; 4	6; 3
4	(Australia) (Italy)	John Fitzgerald; Claudio Panatta	6; 4	8; 10	6; 2
5	(Australia) (Italy)	Pat Cash; Gianni Ocleppo	9; 7	6; 4

=== United States vs. Argentina ===
United States
5
Omni Coliseum, Atlanta, GA, United States
13–15 July 1984
Carpet (indoors)

Argentina
0

			1	2	3	4	5
1	(United States) (Argentina)	John McEnroe; José Luis Clerc	6; 4	6; 0	6; 2
2	(United States) (Argentina)	Jimmy Connors; Martín Jaite	6; 3	6; 4	10; 8
3	(United States) (Argentina)	Peter Fleming / John McEnroe; José Luis Clerc / Martín Jaite	7; 5	4; 6	6; 3	6; 1
4	(United States) (Argentina)	Jimmy Connors; José Luis Clerc	8; 6	6; 2
5	(United States) (Argentina)	John McEnroe; Martín Jaite	6; 3	6; 4

=== Czechoslovakia vs. France ===
Czechoslovakia
3
Hradec Králové, Czechoslovakia
13–15 July 1984
Carpet (indoors)

France
2

			1	2	3	4	5
1	(Czechoslovakia) (France)	Ivan Lendl; Henri Leconte	3; 6	6; 8	4; 6
2	(Czechoslovakia) (France)	Tomáš Šmíd; Guy Forget	6; 4	2; 6	3; 6	6; 1	6; 4
3	(Czechoslovakia) (France)	Pavel Složil / Tomáš Šmíd; Henri Leconte / Pascal Portes	6; 2	5; 7	7; 5	4; 6	6; 2
4	(Czechoslovakia) (France)	Ivan Lendl; Guy Forget	11; 9	6; 4	6; 2
5	(Czechoslovakia) (France)	Tomáš Šmíd; Henri Leconte	3; 6	3; 6

=== Sweden vs. Paraguay ===
Sweden
4
Båstad Tennis Stadium, Båstad, Sweden
13–15 July 1984
Clay

Paraguay
1

			1	2	3	4	5
1	(Sweden) (Paraguay)	Henrik Sundström; Víctor Pecci	6; 3	6; 4	2; 6	6; 4
2	(Sweden) (Paraguay)	Anders Järryd; Francisco González	6; 3	6; 2	6; 4
3	(Sweden) (Paraguay)	Stefan Edberg / Anders Järryd; Francisco González / Víctor Pecci	2; 6	6; 8	6; 4	1; 6
4	(Sweden) (Paraguay)	Henrik Sundström; Francisco González	6; 3	6; 1	6; 2
5	(Sweden) (Paraguay)	Anders Järryd; Oscar Napout	6; 3	6; 0

== Semifinals ==
=== United States vs. Australia ===
United States
4
Memorial Coliseum, Portland, OR, United States
28–30 September 1984
Carpet (indoors)

Australia
1

			1	2	3	4	5
1	(United States) (Australia)	John McEnroe; Pat Cash	6; 3	6; 4	6; 1
2	(United States) (Australia)	Jimmy Connors; John Fitzgerald	6; 3	6; 3	6; 2
3	(United States) (Australia)	Peter Fleming / John McEnroe; Mark Edmondson / Paul McNamee	6; 4	6; 2	6; 3
4	(United States) (Australia)	John McEnroe; John Fitzgerald	4; 6	6; 2	6; 1
5	(United States) (Australia)	Jimmy Connors; Pat Cash	4; 6	2; 6

=== Sweden vs. Czechoslovakia ===
Sweden
5
Båstad Tennis Stadium, Båstad, Sweden
28–30 September 1984
Clay

Czechoslovakia
0

			1	2	3	4	5
1	(Sweden) (Czechoslovakia)	Mats Wilander; Tomáš Šmíd	7; 5	7; 5	6; 2
2	(Sweden) (Czechoslovakia)	Henrik Sundström; Ivan Lendl	4; 6	3; 6	6; 3	6; 1	6; 1
3	(Sweden) (Czechoslovakia)	Stefan Edberg / Anders Järryd; Pavel Složil / Tomáš Šmíd	2; 6	5; 7	6; 1	10; 8	6; 2
4	(Sweden) (Czechoslovakia)	Mats Wilander; Ivan Lendl	6; 3	4; 6	6; 2
5	(Sweden) (Czechoslovakia)	Henrik Sundström; Tomáš Šmíd	6; 4	6; 4

== Final ==
=== Sweden vs. United States ===
Sweden
4
Scandinavium, Gothenburg, Sweden
16–18 December 1984
Clay (indoors)

United States
1

			1	2	3	4	5
1	(Sweden) (United States)	Mats Wilander; Jimmy Connors	6; 1	6; 3	6; 3
2	(Sweden) (United States)	Henrik Sundström; John McEnroe	13; 11	6; 4	6; 3
3	(Sweden) (United States)	Stefan Edberg / Anders Järryd; Peter Fleming / John McEnroe	7; 5	5; 7	6; 2	7; 5
4	(Sweden) (United States)	Mats Wilander; John McEnroe	3; 6	7; 5	3; 6
5	(Sweden) (United States)	Henrik Sundström; Jimmy Arias	3; 6	8; 6	6; 3

== Relegation play-offs ==
The first-round losers played in the Relegation Play-offs. The winners of the play-offs advanced to the 1985 Davis Cup World Group, and the losers were relegated to their respective Zonal Regions.

=== Results summary ===
Date: 28–30 September

Home team	Score	Visiting team	Location	Surface	Ref.
Great Britain	1–4	Yugoslavia	Eastbourne	Grass	
West Germany	5–0	Romania	West Berlin	Clay	
Denmark	2–3	India	Aarhus	Clay	
Ecuador	4–1	New Zealand	Guayaquil	Clay	

- Ecuador, India, West Germany and Yugoslavia remain in the World Group in 1985.
- Denmark, Great Britain, New Zealand and Romania are relegated to Zonal competition in 1985.

=== Great Britain vs. Yugoslavia ===
Great Britain
1
Devonshire Park Lawn Tennis Club, Eastbourne, United Kingdom
28–30 September 1984
Grass

Yugoslavia
4

			1	2	3	4	5
1	(United Kingdom) (Socialist Federal Republic of Yugoslavia)	Steve Shaw; Marko Ostoja	7; 5	4; 6	7; 9	2; 6
2	(United Kingdom) (Socialist Federal Republic of Yugoslavia)	John Lloyd; Slobodan Živojinović	6; 4	5; 7	7; 5	3; 6	8; 10
3	(United Kingdom) (Socialist Federal Republic of Yugoslavia)	Colin Dowdeswell / John Lloyd; Marko Ostoja / Slobodan Živojinović	6; 3	9; 7	6; 1
4	(United Kingdom) (Socialist Federal Republic of Yugoslavia)	Steve Shaw; Slobodan Živojinović	6; 8	6; 8	3; 6
5	(United Kingdom) (Socialist Federal Republic of Yugoslavia)	John Lloyd; Marko Ostoja	4; 6	6; 1	2; 6

=== West Germany vs. Romania ===
West Germany
5
Rot-Weiss Tennis Club, West Berlin
28–30 September 1984
Clay

Romania
0

			1	2	3	4	5
1	(West Germany) (Romania)	Hans Schwaier; Adrian Marcu	6; 2	6; 0	6; 1
2	(West Germany) (Romania)	Michael Westphal; Andrei Dîrzu	6; 2	7; 5	7; 5
3	(West Germany) (Romania)	Hans-Dieter Beutel / Wolfgang Popp; Andrei Dîrzu / Mihnea-Ion Năstase	6; 3	6; 1	6; 4
4	(West Germany) (Romania)	Michael Westphal; Adrian Marcu	6; 0	8; 6
5	(West Germany) (Romania)	Hans Schwaier; Andrei Dîrzu	9; 7	7; 5

=== Denmark vs. India ===
Denmark
2
KB Hallen, Aarhus, Denmark
28–30 September 1984
Clay

India
3

			1	2	3	4	5
1	(Denmark) (India)	Michael Mortensen; Vijay Amritraj	0; 6	1; 6	2; 6
2	(Denmark) (India)	Peter Bastiansen; Ramesh Krishnan	0; 6	1; 6	4; 6
3	(Denmark) (India)	Peter Bastiansen / Michael Mortensen; Anand Amritraj / Vijay Amritraj	6; 4	7; 5	6; 4
4	(Denmark) (India)	Michael Mortensen; Ramesh Krishnan	2; 6	3; 6	8; 10
5	(Denmark) (India)	Peter Bastiansen; Sashi Menon	6; 0	4; 6	6; 1

=== Ecuador vs. New Zealand ===
Ecuador
4
Guayaquil Tenis Club, Guayaquil, Ecuador
28–30 September 1984
Clay

New Zealand
1

			1	2	3	4	5
1	(Ecuador) (New Zealand)	Andrés Gómez; Russell Simpson	6; 1	11; 9	6; 0
2	(Ecuador) (New Zealand)	Raúl Viver; Chris Lewis	3; 6	4; 6	3; 6
3	(Ecuador) (New Zealand)	Andrés Gómez / Ricardo Ycaza; Chris Lewis / Russell Simpson	6; 3	6; 2	6; 3
4	(Ecuador) (New Zealand)	Raúl Viver; Russell Simpson	6; 4	3; 6	6; 2	6; 4
5	(Ecuador) (New Zealand)	Andrés Gómez; Chris Lewis	6; 2	6; 2
