= Lee Woo-ryong =

South Korean tennis player

- Country (sports): South Korea
- Born: 8 April 1961 (age 64); Gimhae, South Korea
- Height: 5 ft 8 in (173 cm)

Singles
- Career record: 0–1
- Highest ranking: No. 385 (7 July 1986)

Doubles
- Highest ranking: No. 618 (7 July 1986)
Medal record
Asian Games
Gold medal – first place	1982 Delhi	Men's doubles

Lee Woo-ryong (born 8 April 1961) is a South Korean former professional tennis player.

Active in the 1980s, Lee is a native of Gimhae and reached a best singles world ranking of 385.

Lee was a men's doubles gold medalist at the 1982 Asian Games, partnering Kim Choon-ho.

During the early 1980s he was a member of the South Korea Davis Cup team, debuting in a 1981 World Group relegation play-off against Italy. He played in a total of three singles and one doubles rubber during his career, with his other appearances coming in 1983 ties against the Philippines and Japan.

Following a stroke he suffered in 2004, which caused paralysis in his left arm, Lee took up the sport of table tennis and competes in national events for disabled athletes.

== See also ==
- List of South Korea Davis Cup team representatives
