= 1985 Davis Cup =

1985 edition of the Davis Cup

Details
- Duration: 8 March – 22 December 1985
- Edition: 74th
- Teams: 62

Champion
- Winning nation: Sweden

The 1985 Davis Cup (also known as the 1985 Davis Cup by NEC for sponsorship purposes) was the 74th edition of the Davis Cup, the most important tournament between national teams in men's tennis. 63 teams would enter the competition, 16 in the World Group, 27 in the Europe Zone, 12 in the Eastern Zone, and 8 in the Americas Zone. Cyprus made its first appearance in the tournament.

Sweden defeated West Germany in the final, held at the Olympiahalle in Munich, West Germany, on 20–22 December, to win their 2nd consecutive Davis Cup title and 3rd overall.

== World Group ==
Participating teams
Argentina	Australia	Chile	Czechoslovakia
Ecuador	France	India	Italy
Japan	Paraguay	Soviet Union	Spain
Sweden	United States	West Germany	Yugoslavia

=== Draw ===
First round 8–10 March
Kyoto, Japan (indoor carpet)
United States	5
Japan	0
Sindelfingen, West Germany (indoor carpet)
Spain	2
West Germany	3
Tbilisi, Soviet Union (indoor carpet)
Czechoslovakia	3
Soviet Union	2
Buenos Aires, Argentina (clay)
Argentina	1
Ecuador	4
Asunción, Paraguay (wood)
Paraguay	3
France	2
Split, Yugoslavia (indoor clay)
Yugoslavia	2
Australia	3
Calcutta, India (grass)
India	3
Italy	2
Santiago, Chile (clay) [19–21 April]
Chile	1
Sweden	4

Quarterfinals; 2–4 August
Hamburg, West Germany (clay)
United States	2
West Germany	3
Guayaquil, Ecuador (clay)
Czechoslovakia	5
Ecuador	0
Sydney, Australia (grass)
Paraguay	2
Australia	3
Bangalore, India (grass)
India	1
Sweden	4

Semifinals; 4–6 October
Frankfurt, West Germany (indoor carpet)
West Germany	5
Czechoslovakia	0
Malmö, Sweden (indoor clay)
Australia	0
Sweden	5

Final; 20–22 December
Munich, West Germany (indoor carpet)
West Germany	2
Sweden	3

=== Final ===
West Germany vs. Sweden

West Germany
2
Olympiahalle, Munich, West Germany
20–22 December 1985
Carpet (indoors)

Sweden
3

			1	2	3	4	5
1	(West Germany) (Sweden)	Michael Westphal; Mats Wilander	3; 6	4; 6	8; 10
2	(West Germany) (Sweden)	Boris Becker; Stefan Edberg	6; 3	3; 6	7; 5	8; 6
3	(West Germany) (Sweden)	Boris Becker / Andreas Maurer; Joakim Nyström / Mats Wilander	4; 6	2; 6	1; 6
4	(West Germany) (Sweden)	Boris Becker; Mats Wilander	6; 3	2; 6	6; 3	6; 3
5	(West Germany) (Sweden)	Michael Westphal; Stefan Edberg	6; 3	5; 7	4; 6	3; 6

=== Relegation play-offs ===
Date: 4–6 October

Home team	Score	Visiting team	Location	Door	Surface
Japan	0–3	Spain	Tokyo	Outdoor	Clay
Argentina	2–3	Soviet Union	Buenos Aires	Outdoor	Clay
Yugoslavia	4–1	France	Belgrade	Indoor	Hard
Italy	3–1	Chile	Cagliari	Outdoor	Clay

- Italy, Soviet Union, Spain and Yugoslavia remain in the World Group in 1986.
- Argentina, Chile, France and Japan are relegated to Zonal competition in 1986.

== Americas Zone ==
Quarterfinals; 8–10 March
Caracas, Venezuela (hard)
Brazil	5
Venezuela	0
Montevideo, Uruguay (clay)
Uruguay	2
Colombia	3
Chicoutimi, Canada (indoor carpet)
Caribbean/West Indies	1
Canada	4
Mexico City, Mexico (clay)
Peru	2
Mexico	3

Semifinals; 2–4 August
Porto Alegre, Brazil (clay)
Brazil	4
Colombia	1
Chicoutimi, Canada (clay)
Canada	2
Mexico	3

Final; 4–6 October
Porto Alegre, Brazil (clay)
Brazil	1
Mexico	4

- Mexico are promoted to the World Group in 1986.

== Eastern Zone ==
First round 18–20 January
New Zealand
bye
Taipei, Taiwan (indoor hard)
Chinese Taipei	5
Sri Lanka	0
China
bye
Singapore (grass)
Hong Kong	4
Singapore	1
Kuala Lumpur, Malaysia (grass)
Philippines	5
Malaysia	0
bye
Thailand
Seoul, South Korea (indoor carpet)
South Korea	5
Indonesia	0
bye
Pakistan

Quarterfinals; 8–10 March
Auckland, New Zealand (hard)
New Zealand	5
Chinese Taipei	0
Shanghai, China (clay)
China	3
Hong Kong	2
Bangkok, Thailand (hard)
Philippines	4
Thailand	1
Islamabad, Pakistan (clay)
South Korea	4
Pakistan	1

Semifinals; 10–12 May
Wellington, New Zealand (indoor hard)
New Zealand	5
China	0
Manila, Philippines (hard)
Philippines	0
South Korea	5

Final; 4–6 October
Christchurch, New Zealand (grass)
New Zealand	4
South Korea	0

- New Zealand are promoted to the World Group in 1986.

== Europe Zone ==
=== Zone A ===
First round 10–12 May
Romania
bye
Turkey	w/o
Iran
Casablanca, Morocco (clay)
Hungary	4
Morocco	1
Cairo, Egypt (clay)
Egypt	4
Algeria	1
Dakar, Senegal (hard)
Senegal	1
Monaco	4
Nicosia, Cyprus (clay)
Cyprus	1
Ireland	4
Brussels, Belgium (clay)
Bulgaria	1
Belgium	3
bye
Denmark

Quarterfinals; 14–16 June
Istanbul, Turkey (clay)
Romania	5
Turkey	0
Cairo, Egypt (clay)
Hungary	2
Egypt	3
Monte Carlo, Monaco (clay)
Monaco	3
Ireland	2
Holte, Denmark (clay)
Belgium	0
Denmark	5

Semifinals; 2–4 August
Bucharest, Romania (clay)
Romania	4
Egypt	1
Monte Carlo, Monaco (clay)
Monaco	0
Denmark	5

Final; 4–6 October
Bucharest, Romania (clay)
Romania	2
Denmark	3

- Denmark are promoted to the World Group in 1986.

=== Zone B ===
First round 10–12 May
Israel
bye
Hilversum, Netherlands (clay)
Finland	1
Netherlands	4
Austria
bye
Athens, Greece (clay)
Norway	1
Greece	4
Warsaw, Poland (clay)
Poland	2
Zimbabwe	3
Tunis, Tunisia (clay)
Tunisia	0
Switzerland	5
Lisbon, Portugal (clay)
Portugal	5
Luxembourg	0
bye
Great Britain

Quarterfinals; 14–16 June
Ramat HaSharon, Israel (hard)
Israel	4
Netherlands	1
Athens, Greece (clay)
Austria	3
Greece	2
Weggis, Switzerland (clay)
Zimbabwe	0
Switzerland	5
Nottingham, United Kingdom (grass)
Portugal	0
Great Britain	5

Semifinals; 2–4 August
Hartberg, Austria (clay)
Israel	3
Austria	2
Eastbourne, United Kingdom (grass)
Switzerland	0
Great Britain	3

Final; 4–6 October
Eastbourne, United Kingdom (grass)
Israel	1
Great Britain	4

- Great Britain are promoted to the World Group in 1986.
