= List of South Korea Davis Cup team representatives =

This is a list of tennis players who have represented the South Korea Davis Cup team in an official Davis Cup match. South Korea have taken part in the competition since 1960.

== Players ==
Player	W–L (Total)	W–L (Singles)	W–L (Doubles)	Ties	Debut
An Jae-sung	4–3	3–2	1–1	5	2005
Bae Nam-ju	1–3	0–2	1–1	3	1988
Baek Se-hyun	0–1	0–1	0–0	1	1965
Baek Seung-bok	0–4	0–3	0–1	2	2001
Chang Eui-jong	13–11	8–7	5–4	10	1991
Cho Min Hyeok	2–4	2–4	0–0	4	2012
Cho Soong-jae	2–0	1–0	1–0	1	2011
Choi Boo-kil	2–4	2–1	0–3	4	1975
Chung Yong-ho	1–18	1–11	0–7	8	1962
Chung Hee-sung	2–3	0–1	2–2	5	2000
Chung Hee-seok	14–8	7–3	7–5	13	2002
Chung Hong	0–0	0–0	0–0	1	2011
Chung Hyeon	5–3	5–2	0–1	4	2014
Hong Seong-chan	1–1	1–1	0–0	1	2015
Im Chung-yang	2–9	2–5	0–4	4	1964
Im Kyu-tae	6–9	5–7	1–2	11	2003
Jeon Young-dai	14–10	11–4	3–6	14	1980
Jeon Chang-dae	5–5	5–4	0–1	6	1980
Jeong Suk-young	4–5	4–4	0–1	6	2010
Ji Seung-ho	3–3	2–2	1–1	3	1991
Ju Chang-nam	4–8	2–5	2–3	5	1976
Jun Woong-sun	12–8	9–5	3–3	11	2004
Kim Bong-soo	18–9	13–8	5–1	14	1984
Kim Chi-wan	6–4	1–1	5–3	8	1992
Kim Choon-ho	8–11	7–8	1–3	8	1980
Kim Jae-sik	5–4	4–2	1–2	5	1989
Kim Nam-hoon	1–0	0–0	1–0	1	1998
Kim Sung-bae	4–8	4–6	0–2	6	1971
Kim Bong-suk	2–6	1–3	1–3	5	1978
Kim Doo-hwan	2–15	2–11	0–4	8	1962
Kim Ke-hwan	0–1	0–0	0–1	1	1960
Kim Moon-il	3–13	2–8	1–5	8	1968
Kim Dong-hyun	5–7	3–4	2–3	10	1997
Kim Young-jun	6–4	6–3	0–1	6	2003
Kim Sun-yong	3–1	3–1	0–0	3	2005
Kim Hyun-joon	3–4	2–1	1–3	4	2010
Kwon Oh-hee	3–1	1–0	2–1	4	2002
Lee Ek-son	0–1	0–1	0–0	1	1968
Lee Woo-ryong	1–3	0–3	1–0	3	1981
Lee Sang-yun	0–8	0–5	0–3	3	1960
Lee Tong-won	0–1	0–1	0–0	1	1962
Lee Jong-min	0–1	0–0	0–1	1	1996
Lee Hyung-taik	51–24	41–9	10–15	31	1995
Lee Seung-hoon	0–3	0–3	0–0	3	2000
Lim Yong-kyu	14–10	10–7	4–3	14	2009
Na Jung-woong	0–1	0–1	0–0	1	2012
Nam Hyun-woo	1–0	1–0	0–0	1	2004
Nam Ji-sung	2–4	1–1	1–3	4	2013
Park Do-sung	0–1	0–0	0–1	1	1963
Roh Gap-taik	7–1	7–1	0–0	5	1985
Seol Jae-min	3–4	0–1	3–3	6	2010
Shin Han-cheol	3–7	2–7	1–0	5	1992
Song Dong-wook	13–12	7–7	6–5	15	1981
Song Hyeong-keun	0–2	0–2	0–0	1	1999
Song Min-kyu	0–2	0–0	0–2	2	2015
Suk Hyun-joon	0–2	0–2	0–0	1	2005
Um Hwa-yong	0–2	0–2	0–0	1	1960
Yoo Jin-sun	18–11	8–5	10–6	17	1984
Yoon Yong-il	19–14	16–10	3–4	16	1993
