= Kim Nam-hoon =

South Korean tennis player

- Country (sports): South Korea
- Born: 8 March 1970 (age 55)

Singles
- Highest ranking: No. 516 (14 Aug 1995)

Doubles
- Career record: 1–3 (ATP Tour & Davis Cup)
- Highest ranking: No. 374 (6 Dec 1993)
Medal record
Universiade
Gold medal – first place	1993 Buffalo	Men's doubles

Kim Nam-hoon (born 8 March 1970) is a South Korean former professional tennis player.

Kim, a graduate of Yeungnam High School in Daegu, attended Ulsan University and was a men's doubles gold medalist for South Korea at the 1993 Summer Universiade in Buffalo.

On the professional tour, Kim was a three-time doubles main draw entrant on the ATP Tour's Korea Open and a singles quarter-finalist at a Seoul Challenger tournament in 1994, beating the top-seeded Tim Henman en route.

Kim was a member of the South Korea Davis Cup team in 1998 and secured a tie against China with a win in doubles, partnering Kim Dong-hyun. He also captained the side after being appointed men's national coach in 2008.

== See also ==
- List of South Korea Davis Cup team representatives
