= Kjell Johansson (tennis) =

Swedish tennis player (born 1951)

- Full name: Kjell Bernhard Johansson
- Country (sports): Sweden
- Residence: Dalsjöfors, Sweden
- Born: 12 February 1951 (age 75) Toarp, Älvsborg County, Sweden
- Turned pro: 1973
- Retired: 1982
- Plays: Right-handed
- Prize money: $49,711

Singles
- Career record: 120–142
- Career titles: 1
- Highest ranking: No. 32 (21 August 1978)

Grand Slam singles results
- Australian Open: 1R (1975)
- French Open: 3R (1975)
- Wimbledon: 2R (1974)
- US Open: 3R (1975, 1976)

Doubles
- Career record: 47–94
- Highest ranking: No. 516 (24 February 1986)

Grand Slam doubles results
- Australian Open: 1R (1975)
- French Open: 2R (1973)
- Wimbledon: 1R (1974)
- US Open: 1R (1975)

Grand Slam mixed doubles results
- French Open: 1R (1975)

Kjell Johansson (born 12 February 1951) is a Swedish former tennis player.

Johansson turned professional in 1974. He won one singles title (1978, Lagos) during his career and reached his highest individual ranking on the ATP Tour on 21 August 1978, when he became world number 32.

He represented Sweden in the Davis Cup in 1973, 1976, 1977, 1978, 1979, 1980 and 1981.

== Early life ==
Johansson was born on 12 February 1951 in Toarp, Älvsborg County, Sweden. He developed his tennis game in the early 1970s. He regularly trained and competed alongside contemporary national figures such as Björn Borg.

== Professional career ==
Johansson turned professional and began playing on the international tennis circuit in 1974. Throughout his playing career, he recorded a total of 120 singles match victories on the professional circuit. In Grand Slam competitions, he made multiple main-draw appearances at major tournaments, including the French Open and the US Open.

He captured the sole Grand Prix/ATP Tour singles title of his career on 12 March 1978 at the Lagos Classic tournament in Nigeria. He secured the championship tier title at the Lagos Lawn Tennis Club by defeating British player Robin Drysdale in the tournament's final match.

Johansson reached his peak individual singles ranking on 21 August 1978, ascending to world No. 32.

His best results in Grand Slam men's singles was reaching the third round at the 1975 French Open, the 1975 US Open, and the 1976 US Open.

His best result in Grand Slam men's doubles was reaching the second round at the 1973 French Open with Björn Borg.

At the 1975 US Open, playing in doubles alongside Björn Andersson, they lost in the first round to Americans Steve Turner and Steve Siegel.

== Davis Cup ==
Johansson was a representative for the Sweden Davis Cup team. He played in tournament ties in 1973, 1976, 1977, 1978, 1979, 1980 and 1981. Over his Davis Cup career, Johansson competed exclusively in singles match play.

He accumulated a 13–11 overall win-loss record across 24 international matches. He played his final Davis Cup tie in March 1981 during a World Group first-round fixture away against Japan. During that tie, he won both of his singles matches in straight sets against Japanese players Tsuyoshi Fukui and Shigeyuki Nishio.

== Career finals ==
=== Singles (1 titles, 3 runner-ups) ===
Result	W/L	Date	Tournament	Surface	Opponent	Score
Loss	0–1	1976	Valencia, Spain	Clay	(Spain) Manuel Orantes	2–6, 2–6, 2–6
Loss	0–2	1977	Helsinki, Finland	Carpet	(United Kingdom) Mark Cox	3–6, 3–6
Win	1–2	1978	Lagos, Nigeria	Clay	(United Kingdom) Robin Drysdale	9–8, 6–3
Loss	1–3	1978	Cairo, Egypt	Clay	(Spain) José Higueras	6–4, 4–6, 4–6

=== Doubles (1 runner-up) ===
Result	W/L	Date	Tournament	Surface	Partner	Opponents	Score
Loss	0–1	1980	Lagos, Nigeria	Clay	(Finland) Leo Palin	(United States) Tony Graham (United States) Bruce Nichols	3–6, 6–0, 3–6

== See also ==
- Sweden Davis Cup team
