= 1982 Davis Cup =

1982 edition of the Davis Cup

Details
- Duration: 5 March – 28 November 1982
- Edition: 71st
- Teams: 57

Champion
- Winning nation: United States

The 1982 Davis Cup (also known as the 1982 Davis Cup by NEC for sponsorship purposes) was the 71st edition of the Davis Cup, the most important tournament between national teams in men's tennis. 58 teams would enter the competition, 16 in the World Group, 22 in the Europe Zone, 10 in the Americas Zone, and 10 in the Eastern Zone. Tunisia made its first appearance in the tournament.

The United States defeated France in the final, held at the Palais des Sports in Grenoble, France, on 26–28 November, to win their 28th title overall.

== World Group ==
Participating teams
| Argentina | Australia | Chile | Czechoslovakia |
| France | Great Britain | India | Italy |
| Mexico | New Zealand | Romania | Spain |
| Soviet Union | Sweden | United States | West Germany |

=== Draw ===
First round 5–7 March
Carlsbad, CA, United States (hard)
United States | 4
India | 1
Stockholm, Sweden (indoor carpet)
Sweden | 4
Soviet Union | 1
Mexico City, Mexico (clay)
Australia | 3
Mexico | 2
Santiago, Chile (clay)
Romania | 1
Chile | 3
Christchurch, New Zealand (grass)
Spain | 2
New Zealand | 3
Rome, Italy (clay)
Italy | 3
Great Britain | 2
Prague, Czechoslovakia (indoor carpet)
West Germany | 0
Czechoslovakia | 5
Buenos Aires, Argentina (clay)
France | 3
Argentina | 2

Quarterfinals; 9–11 July
St. Louis, MO, United States (indoor carpet)
United States | 3
Sweden | 2
Brisbane, Australia (grass)
Australia | 4
Chile | 1
Cervia, Italy (clay)
New Zealand | 3
Italy | 2
Paris, France (clay)
Czechoslovakia | 2
France | 3

Semifinals; 1–3 October
Perth, Australia (indoor carpet)
United States | 5
Australia | 0
Aix-en-Provence, France (clay)
New Zealand | 2
France | 3

Final; 26–28 November
Grenoble, France (indoor clay)
United States | 4
France | 1

=== Final ===
France vs. United States

France
1
Palais des Sports, Grenoble, France
26–28 November 1982
Clay (indoors)

United States
4

| | | | 1 | 2 | 3 | 4 | 5 |
|---|---|---|---|---|---|---|---|
| 1 | (France) (United States) | Yannick Noah; John McEnroe | 10; 12 | 6; 1 | 6; 3 | 2; 6 | 3; 6 |
| 2 | (France) (United States) | Henri Leconte; Gene Mayer | 2; 6 | 2; 6 | 9; 7 | 4; 6 |
| 3 | (France) (United States) | Henri Leconte / Yannick Noah; Peter Fleming / John McEnroe | 3; 6 | 4; 6 | 7; 9 |
| 4 | (France) (United States) | Yannick Noah; Gene Mayer | 6; 1 | 6; 0 |
| 5 | (France) (United States) | Henri Leconte; John McEnroe | 2; 6 | 3; 6 |

=== Relegation play-offs ===
Date: 1–3 October

| Home team | Score | Visiting team | Location | Surface |
|---|---|---|---|---|
| Soviet Union | 4–1 | India | Donetsk | Clay |
| Mexico | 2–3 | Romania | Mexico City | Clay |
| Spain | 2–3 | Great Britain | Barcelona | Clay |
| Argentina | 3–2 | West Germany | Buenos Aires | Clay |

- Argentina, Great Britain, Romania and Soviet Union remain in the World Group in 1983.
- India, Mexico, Spain and West Germany are relegated to Zonal competition in 1983.

== Americas Zone ==
Sub-Zonal Quarterfinals; 8–10 January
Colombia
bye
bye
Caribbean/West Indies
Canada
bye
bye
Venezuela
Brazil
bye
La Paz, Bolivia (clay)
Ecuador | 5
Bolivia | 0
Asunción, Paraguay (clay)
Paraguay | 3
Peru | 2
bye
Uruguay

Sub-Zonal Semifinals; 15–24 January
Bogotá, Colombia (clay)
Colombia | 5
Caribbean/West Indies | 0
Caracas, Venezuela (hard)
Canada | 4
Venezuela | 1
Fortaleza, Brazil (clay)
Brazil | 0
Ecuador | 5
Montevideo, Uruguay (clay)
Paraguay | 3
Uruguay | 2

Sub-Zonal Finals; 5–7 March
Montreal, Canada (indoor hard)
Colombia | 1
Canada | 3
Asunción, Paraguay (indoor carpet)
Ecuador | 2
Paraguay | 3

Sub-Zonal Finals; 7–9 May
Laval, Canada (indoor hard)
Canada | 1
Paraguay | 4

- Paraguay are promoted to the World Group in 1983.

== Eastern Zone ==
First round 8–10 January
Malaysia
bye
bye
Indonesia
South Korea
bye
Causeway Bay, Hong Kong (hard)
Hong Kong | 2
Philippines | 3
Chinese Taipei | w/o
Pakistan
bye
Japan
Sri Lanka
bye
bye
South Korea

Quarterfinals; 22–24 January
Kuala Lumpur, Malaysia (indoor carpet)
Malaysia | 1
Indonesia | 4
Manila, Philippines (indoor clay)
South Korea | 4
Philippines | 1
Taipei, Taiwan (indoor hard)
Chinese Taipei | 1
Japan | 4
Colombo, Sri Lanka (clay)
Sri Lanka | 1
Thailand | 3

Semifinals; 5–7 March
Jakarta, Indonesia (clay)
Indonesia | 3
South Korea | 2
Tokyo, Japan (clay)
Japan | 5
Thailand | 0

Final; 7–9 May
Jakarta, Indonesia (clay)
Indonesia | 4
Japan | 1

- Indonesia are promoted to the World Group in 1983.

== Europe Zone ==
=== Zone A ===
First round 7–9 May
Dublin, Ireland (indoor hard)
Ireland | 5
Luxembourg | 0
bye
Monaco
Ankara, Turkey (clay)
Turkey | 0
Greece | 5
bye
Finland
Austria
bye
bye
Algeria
Casablanca, Morocco (clay)
Morocco | 3
Poland | 2
bye
Switzerland

Quarterfinals; 11–13 June
Dublin, Ireland (hard)
Ireland | 4
Monaco | 1
Athens, Greece (clay)
Greece | 2
Finland | 3
Vienna, Austria (clay)
Austria | 5
Algeria | 0
Casablanca, Morocco (clay)
Morocco | 0
Switzerland | 5

Semifinals; 9–11 July; 6–8 August
Dublin, Ireland (hard)
Ireland | 4
Finland | 1
Pörtschach, Austria (clay)
Austria | 0
Switzerland | 4

Final; 1–3 October
Dublin, Ireland (hard)
Ireland | 4
Switzerland | 1

- Ireland are promoted to the World Group in 1983.

=== Zone B ===
First round 7–9 May
Hungary
bye
Varaždin, Yugoslavia (clay)
Norway | 0
Yugoslavia | 5
Israel
bye
bye
Belgium
Porto, Portugal (clay)
Portugal | 5
Tunisia | 0
bye
Egypt
Sofia, Bulgaria (clay)
Denmark | 4
Bulgaria | 1
bye
Netherlands

Quarterfinals; 11–13 June
Budapest, Hungary (clay)
Hungary | 3
Yugoslavia | 2
Eupen, Belgium (clay)
Israel | 3
Belgium | 0
Lisbon, Portugal (clay)
Portugal | 0
Egypt | 5
Hørsholm, Denmark (clay)
Denmark | 3
Netherlands | 0

Semifinals; 9–11 July
Budapest, Hungary (clay)
Hungary | 4
Israel | 1
Aarhus, Denmark (clay)
Egypt | 1
Denmark | 4

Final; 1–3 October
Budapest, Hungary (clay)
Hungary | 2
Denmark | 3

- Denmark are promoted to the World Group in 1983.
