= Baek Seung-bok =

South Korean tennis player

- Country (sports): South Korea
- Born: 20 January 1974 (age 52)
- Prize money: $11,243

Singles
- Career record: 0–3 (Davis Cup)
- Highest ranking: No. 587 (10 Jan 2000)

Doubles
- Career record: 0–1 (Davis Cup)
- Highest ranking: No. 669 (14 Jul 200)
Medal record
Universiade
Bronze medal – third place	1995 Fukuoka	Mixed Doubles

Baek Seung-bok (born 20 January 1974) is a South Korean former professional tennis player.

Baek comes from a town in Hoengseong County, Gangwon Province and was a member of the South Korea Davis Cup team from 2001 to 2002. On his debut tie, against New Zealand in Seoul, he played in the deciding reverse singles rubber, which he lost 4–6 in the fifth set to Alistair Hunt. His other appearance was in a 2002 away tie in Tashkent versus Uzbekistan. In 2003 he made the doubles final of the Busan Challenger tournament.

== ATP Challenger/ITF Tour finals ==
=== Singles: 1 (1–0) ===
Result	W–L	Date	Tournament	Tier	Surface	Opponent	Score
Win	1–0	May 1999	Korea F2, Seoul	Futures	Clay	(South Korea) Lee Hyung-taik	3–6, 6–2, 6–2

=== Doubles: 1 (0–1) ===
Result	W–L	Date	Tournament	Tier	Surface	Partner	Opponents	Score
Loss	0–1	Jun 2003	Busan Open, South Korea	Challenger	Hard	(South Korea) Park Seung-kyu	(Japan) Toshihide Matsui (Japan) Michihisa Onoda	1–6, 3–6

== See also ==
- List of South Korea Davis Cup team representatives
