= Italy Davis Cup team =

Davis Cup tennis team representing Italy

Italy
- Captain: Filippo Volandri
- Nations Ranking: 1 (27 November 2023)
- First year: 1922
- Years played: 84
- Ties played (W–L): 277 (186–91)
- Years in World Group: 24 (19–23)
- Davis Cup titles: 4 (1976, 2023, 2024, 2025)
- Runners-up: 6 (1960, 1961, 1977, 1979, 1980, 1998)
- Most total wins: Nicola Pietrangeli (120–44)
- Most singles wins: Nicola Pietrangeli (78–32)
- Most doubles wins: Nicola Pietrangeli (42–12)
- Best doubles team: Orlando Sirola, Nicola Pietrangeli (34–8)
- Most ties played: Nicola Pietrangeli (66)
- Most years played: Simone Bolelli, Nicola Pietrangeli (18)

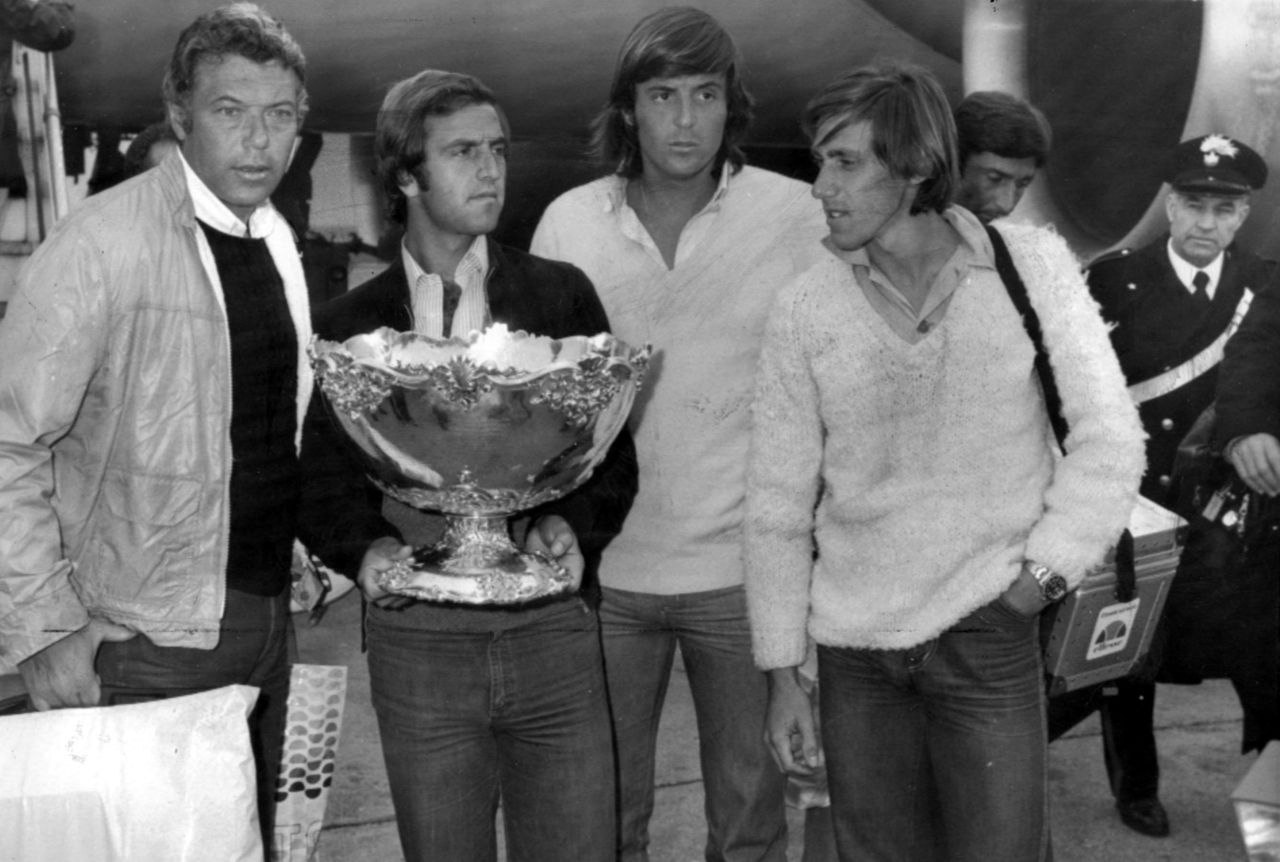
Nicola Pietrangeli, Paolo Bertolucci, Adriano Panatta and Corrado Barazzutti with the trophy in 1976

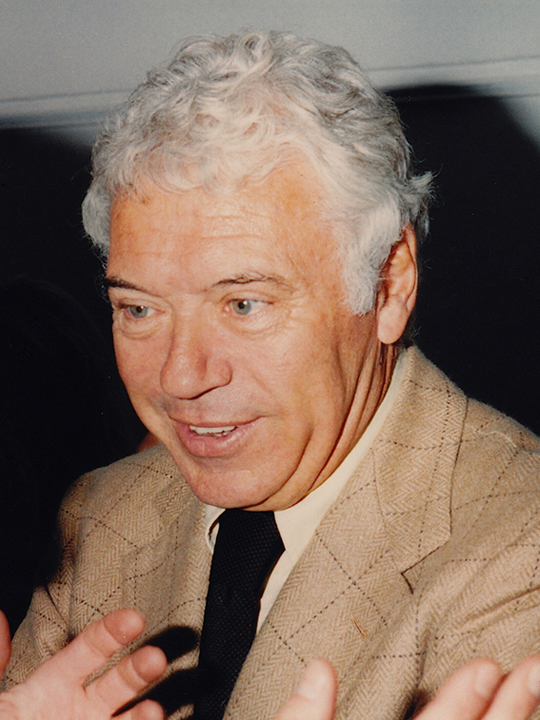
Nicola Pietrangeli, team captain for the country's first Davis Cup championship in 1976

The Italy men's national tennis team represents Italy in Davis Cup tennis competition and is governed by the Italian Tennis Federation.

Italy is the reigning champion, claiming the Davis Cup in 2025. It is a four-time champion overall, also winning in 1976, 2023, and 2024. It finished runner-up six times (1960, 1961, 1977, 1979, 1980, 1998).

The most awarded player (by titles won when part of the team) is Simone Bolelli, with three victories. Matteo Berrettini, Lorenzo Musetti, Jannik Sinner, Lorenzo Sonego and Andrea Vavassori won the Davis Cup twice. The most awarded captain is Filippo Volandri, with three victories.

For the past three years, Italy has won the title, becoming the first country to win the event three consecutive times since the United States in 1972. In 2024 and 2025, Italy was also champion in the Billie Jean King Cup, making it the only country to win both events in consecutive years.

== History ==
=== Early years pre-World War II ===
Italy competed in its first Davis Cup in the 1922 International Lawn Tennis Challenge. Prior to World War II, Italy generally made it to the quarterfinals of the European Zone and featured in the Inter-zonal final twice – once in 1928 and once in 1930. The Inter-zonal final was the final match of competition before the Challenge Round match, where the winner would earn the right to challenge the defending champion. On both occasions, Italy lost to the United States by a scoreline of 4–1. Uberto De Morpurgo was the Davis Cup captain for both matches and was the only player to register a win in his two single rubbers.

=== Post World War II – 1962 ===
Two years after the resumption of the tournament which was put on hold due to World War II, Italy made its first reappearance in 1948. Italy was very strong over this period, appearing in four Inter-zonal finals in 1949, 1952, 1955 and 1958 before finally securing its maiden Challenge Round tie in 1960. Unfortunately, Italy were unable to overcome a strong Australian team featuring Rod Laver and Neale Fraser, losing 4–1 at White City in Sydney. Italian legend, Nicola Pietrangeli managed to win Italy's only point when he defeated Fraser in a dead-rubber match on the final day. The following year, Italy were again able to reach the Challenge Round Final after defeating the United States 4–1 in the Final in Rome. Pietrangeli won both his singles matches and his doubles match. However, Italy would again fall at the final hurdle. On this occasion, Italy lost 5–0 to Australia at Kooyong Stadium in Melbourne. The Australian side would again feature Laver (in singles and doubles) and Fraser (in doubles only), and were joined by Roy Emerson who played two singles matches. The Italian side once again featured Pietrangeli and also Orlando Sirola across all five matches. In 1962, Italy lost in the European Final to Sweden 1–4.

=== Limited success to first Davis Cup title ===
Following a somewhat lean period from 1963 to 1972, which included only one European Final in 1968, Italy returned to form in the competition with mixed success. In 1973 they made a European Final before going one step further the following year, losing 4–1 to South Africa in 1974 in the Inter-zonal Semifinals. Two years later, Italy claimed its maiden Davis Cup title when they defeated Chile 4–1 at Estadio Nacional in Santiago. Italy took an early lead on Day 1, after Corrado Barazzutti and Adriano Panatta both won their singles matches. Then Italy took an unassailable 3–0 lead the following day, when Panatta teamed up with Paolo Bertolucci in the doubles, and after finding themselves one-set-to-love down, won the next three sets to win the rubber in four sets. Over the next four years, Italy would reach the Davis Cup final three times, losing all three ties.

=== World Group era (1981–2000) ===
Since the World Group format begun in 1981, Italy were able to maintain their top 16 status for twenty years. Italy finished as quarterfinalists or better in twelve of those twenty years, including two semifinal loses and one final loss. In the first four years of the format, Italy played Great Britain three times in the first round winning two and losing once. This loss came in the first year of World Group format, forcing them into an end of year World Group regelation play-off against South Korea. They won the tie 4–1 at home in Sanremo earning the right to continue in the World Group for the 1982 edition.

In 1986, Italy lost to Sweden in the quarterfinals and then again in the first round of the 1987 edition forcing them once again into a relegation playoff. They were drawn against South Korea for a second playoff match, this time being held in Seoul. Once again Italy prevailed in the match, 3–2, avoiding relegation into the Europe/Africa Zone for 1988.

Sweden defeated Italy for a third time in the new format in the first round of the 1989 Davis Cup World Group. Italy survived the playoff by defeating Denmark 4–1 away in Aarhus. Italy finally defeated Sweden in their fourth meeting of the new format, with a 3–2 home win in Cagliari in the first round of the 1990 Davis Cup. However, they would lose 5–0 to Austria in the quarterfinals.

In the 2000 Davis Cup, Italy lost 4–1 away to Spain setting them up for World Group Playoff clash against Belgium. Playing at home in Rome, Italy lost the tie 4–1, meaning they would be relegated for the first time in the World Group era.

=== Relegation and return to World Group ===
After Italy's World Group playoff loss, they were relegated to Europe/Africa Zone Group I for the 2001 edition of the tournament. Italy would not return to the World Group until they defeated Chile 4–1 away in the 2011 Davis Cup World Group play-offs. Between 2013 and 2018, Italy were defeated in the Quarterfinals on four occasions and once in the Semifinals. Since the restructuring of the competition in 2019, Italy has made it into the Semifinals in 2022.

=== Return to the top ===
Twenty-five years after the last final (1998) and 47 years after the last victory (1976), on 26 November 2023 Italy returned to win the Davis Cup, beating Australia 2–0.

On 24 November 2024, Jannik Sinner won the deciding game to beat the Netherlands 2-0 and give Italy the third Davis Cup, which adds up to Italy's women winning the Billie Jean King Cup title on the same year.

== Overall performance ==
Italy has played no less than 15 semifinals. Italy has recorded eight defeats and seven wins. Of those eight losses, Italy has suffered four whitewash defeats – losing 5–0 to Australia in 1949 and 1955 and the United States in 1952 and 1958. Of the seven semifinals won, the greatest margin was a 4–1 victory, achieved on four occasions. These wins occurred in 1961 and 1998 against the United States, in 1977 against France and in 1979 against Czechoslovakia.

== Results and fixtures ==
The following are lists of match results and scheduled matches for the current year.

Win Loss Fixture

=== 2025 ===
2025 Davis Cup Quarterfinals

Italy
2
SuperTennis Arena Bologna Fiere, Bologna
19 November 2025

Austria
0

			1	2	3
1	(Italy) (Austria)	Matteo Berrettini; Jurij Rodionov	6; 3	7^{7} 6^{4}
2	(Italy) (Austria)	Flavio Cobolli; Filip Misolic	6; 1	6; 3
3	(Italy) (Austria)	Simone Bolelli / Andrea Vavassori; Alexander Erler / Lucas Miedler				not played

2025 Davis Cup Semifinals

Italy
2
SuperTennis Arena Bologna Fiere, Bologna
21 November 2025

Belgium
0

			1	2	3
1	(Italy) (Belgium)	Matteo Berrettini; Raphaël Collignon	6; 3	6; 4
2	(Italy) (Belgium)	Flavio Cobolli; Zizou Bergs	6; 3	6^{5} 7^{7}	7^{17} 6^{15}
3	(Italy) (Belgium)	Simone Bolelli / Andrea Vavassori; Sander Gillé / Joran Vliegen				not played

2025 Davis Cup Final

Italy
2
SuperTennis Arena Bologna Fiere, Bologna
23 November 2025

Spain
0

			1	2	3
1	(Italy) (Spain)	Matteo Berrettini; Pablo Carreño Busta	6; 3	6; 4
2	(Italy) (Spain)	Flavio Cobolli; Jaume Munar	1; 6	7^{7} 6^{5}	7; 5
3	(Italy) (Spain)	Simone Bolelli / Andrea Vavassori; Marcel Granollers / Pedro Martínez				not played

== Players ==
=== Current team ===
Squad representing Italy in the 2026 Davis Cup Finals, Knockout stage
Player	Born	ATP ranking		Debut	Ties	Win-loss		
Player	Born	Singles	Doubles	Debut	Ties	Singles	Doubles	Total
Flavio Cobolli	6 May 2002 (age 24)	6	363	2024	5	4–1	0–0	4–1
Luciano Darderi	14 February 2002 (age 24)	21	191	2026	0	0–0	0–0	0–0
Lorenzo Musetti	3 March 2002 (age 24)	27	213	2021	10	2–5	1–2	3–7
Matteo Berrettini	12 April 1996 (age 30)	43	573	2019	16	12–2	2–2	14–4
Andrea Vavassori	5 May 1995 (age 31)	597	7	2024	3	0–0	1–2	1–2

== Captains ==
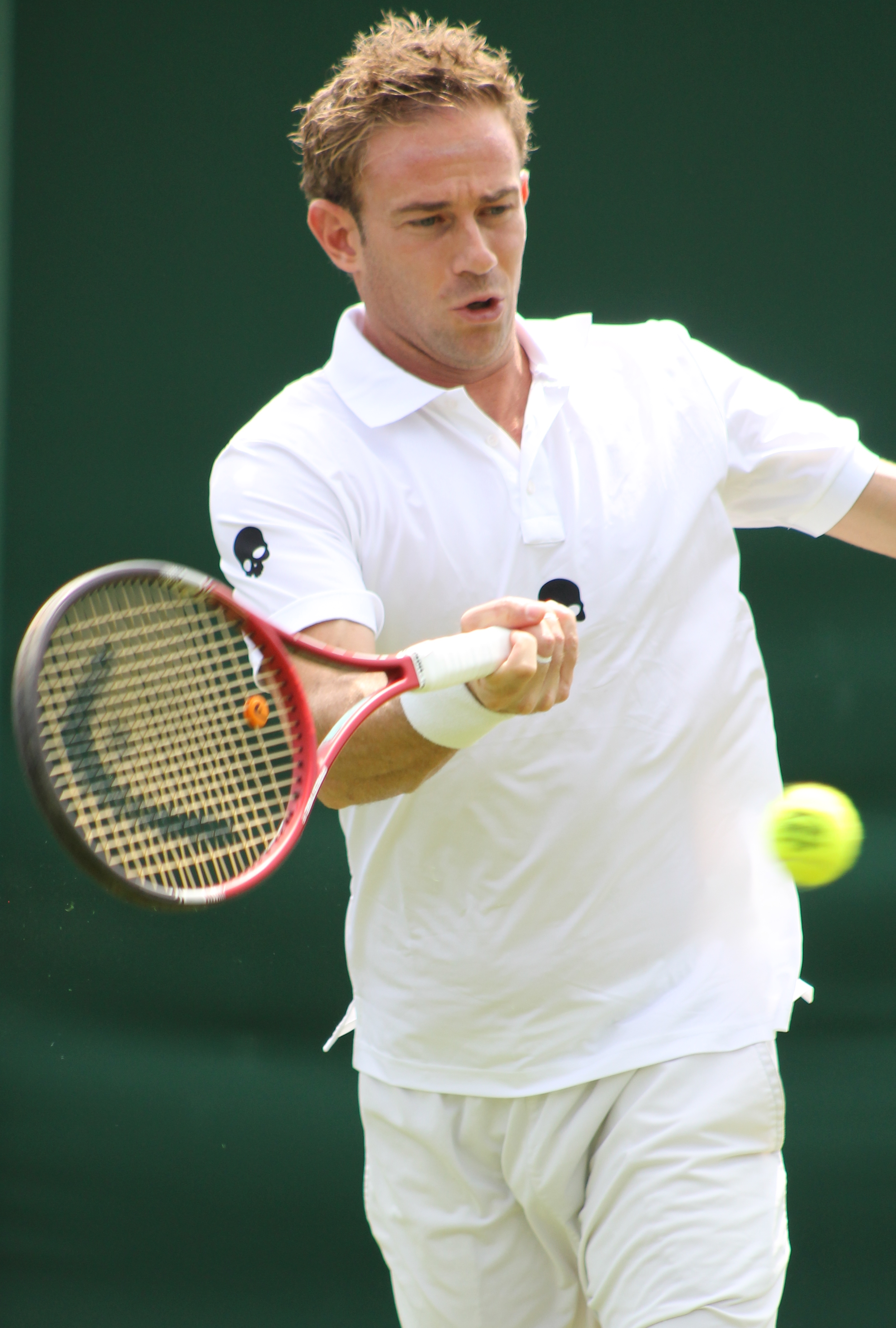
Filippo Volandri, current team captain

Although Italy had started its adventure in the Davis Cup back in 1922, it was only in 1928 that the team had its first captain and it was Baron Uberto De Morpurgo, who was also a player on that occasion.

Beginning in the 1950s, the team captain's position became a kind of coach called the non-playing captain.

12 different individuals has served as Captain of the Italian national tennis team.

List of Italy Davis Cup captains
Name	Tenure	Total	Finals				Best result (Note: Best result if failed to qualify for Davis Cup Final)	
Name	Tenure	Total	W	Years	F	Years	S	Years
Uberto de Morpurgo	1928–?							
Vasco Valerio	1965–1968	4					QF	1968
Orlando Sirola	1969–1971	3					3R	1969
Giordano Maioli	1972	1					3R	1972
Fausto Gardini	1973–1975	3					SF	1974
Nicola Pietrangeli	1976–1977	3	1	1976	1	1977	n/a	
Bitti Bergamo	1978–1979	2			1	1979^{1}	n/a	
Vittorio Crotta	1979–1983	4			2	1979^{1}, 1980	n/a	
Adriano Panatta	1984–1997	14					SF	1996, 1997
Paolo Bertolucci	1998–2000	3			1	1998	n/a	
Corrado Barazzutti	2001–2020	20					SF	2014
Filippo Volandri	2021–	5	3	2023, 2024, 2025			n/a	

Notes

^{1} Crotta replaced Bergamo as captain after the Semifinals during the 1979 campaign.

== Historical results ==
=== 2010s ===
Year	Competition	Date	Location	Opponent	Score	Result
2010	Europe/Africa Zone Group I, 1st Round	5–7 March	Castellaneta (ITA)	Belarus	5–0	Win
2010	Europe/Africa Zone Group I, 2nd Round	7–9 May	Zoetermeer (NED)	Netherlands	4–1	Win
2010	World Group play-offs	17–19 September	Lidköping (SWE)	Sweden	2–3	Loss
2011	Europe/Africa Zone Group I, 2nd Round	8–10 July	Arzachena (ITA)	Slovenia	5–0	Win
2011	World Group play-offs	16–18 September	Santiago (CHI)	Chile	4–1	Win
2012	World Group, 1st Round	10–12 February	Ostrava (CZE)	Czech Republic	4–1	Loss
2012	World Group play-offs	14–16 September	Naples (ITA)	Chile	4–1	Win
2013	World Group, 1st Round	1–3 February	Turin (ITA)	Croatia	5–0	Win
2013	World Group, quarterfinals	5–7 April	Vancouver (CAN)	Canada	3–2	Loss
2014	World Group, 1st Round	31 January – 2 February	Mar del Plata (ARG)	Argentina	3–1	Win
2014	World Group, quarterfinals	4–6 April	Naples (ITA)	Great Britain	3–2	Win
2014	World Group, semifinals	12–14 September	Geneva (SWI)	Switzerland	2–3	Loss
2015	World Group, 1st Round	6–8 March	Astana (KAZ)	Kazakhstan	2–3	Loss
2015	World Group play-offs	18–20 September	Irkutsk (RUS)	Russia	4–1	Win
2016	World Group, 1st Round	4–6 March	Pesaro (ITA)	Switzerland	5–0	Win
2016	World Group, quarterfinals	15–17 July	Pesaro (ITA)	Argentina	1–3	Loss
2017	World Group, 1st Round	3–5 February	Buenos Aires (ARG)	Argentina	3–2	Win
2017	World Group, quarterfinals	7–9 April	Charleroi (BEL)	Belgium	2–3	Loss
2018	World Group, 1st Round	2–4 February	Morioka (JPN)	Japan	3–1	Win
2018	World Group, quarterfinals	6–8 April	Genoa (ITA)	France	1–3	Loss
2019	Qualifying round	2–4 February	Kolkata (IND)	India	3–1	Win
2019	Finals, Round-robin	18 November	Madrid (ESP)	Canada	1–2	Loss
2019	Finals, Round-robin	20 November	Madrid (ESP)	United States	1–2	Loss

=== 2020s ===
Year	Competition	Date	Location	Opponent	Score	Result
2020–21	Qualifying round	6–7 March	Cagliari (ITA)	South Korea	4–0	Win
2020–21	Finals, Round-robin	26 November	Turin (ITA)	United States	2–1	Win
2020–21	Finals, Round-robin	27 November	Turin (ITA)	Colombia	2–1	Win
2020–21	Finals, quarterfinals	29 November	Turin (ITA)	Croatia	1–2	Loss
2022	Qualifying round	4–5 March	Bratislava (SVK)	Slovakia	3–2	Win
2022	Finals, Round-robin	14 September	Bologna (ITA)	Croatia	3–0	Win
2022	Finals, Round-robin	16 September	Bologna (ITA)	Argentina	2–1	Win
2022	Finals, Round-robin	18 September	Bologna (ITA)	Sweden	2–1	Win
2022	Finals, quarterfinals	24 November	Málaga (ESP)	United States	2–1	Win
2022	Finals, semifinals	26 November	Málaga (ESP)	Canada	1–2	Loss
2023	Finals, Round-robin	13 September	Bologna (ITA)	Canada	0–3	Loss
2023	Finals, Round-robin	15 September	Bologna (ITA)	Chile	3–0	Win
2023	Finals, Round-robin	17 September	Bologna (ITA)	Sweden	2–1	Win
2023	Finals, quarterfinals	23 November	Málaga (ESP)	Netherlands	2–1	Win
2023	Finals, semifinals	25 November	Málaga (ESP)	Serbia	2–1	Win
2023	Finals, final	26 November	Málaga (ESP)	Australia	2–0	Champions
2024	Finals, Round-robin	11 September	Bologna (ITA)	Brazil	2–1	Win
2024	Finals, Round-robin	13 September	Bologna (ITA)	Belgium	2–1	Win
2024	Finals, Round-robin	15 September	Bologna (ITA)	Netherlands	2–1	Win
2024	Finals, quarterfinals	21 November	Málaga (ESP)	Argentina	2–1	Win
2024	Finals, semifinals	23 November	Málaga (ESP)	Australia	2–0	Win
2024	Finals, final	24 November	Málaga (ESP)	Netherlands	2–0	Champions
2025	Finals, quarterfinals	19 November	Bologna (ITA)	Austria	2–0	Win
2025	Finals, semifinals	21 November	Bologna (ITA)	Belgium	2–0	Win
2025	Finals, final	23 November	Bologna (ITA)	Spain	2–0	Champions

== Individual and team records ==
As of 15 September 2024

Record		Details	Report
Youngest player	17 years, 327 days	Diego Nargiso versus Israel in 1988 World Group, first round	
Oldest player	38 years, 342 days	Simone Bolelli versus Netherlands in 2024 Davis Cup Finals, Group stage	
Longest rubber duration	4 hours, 29 minutes	Federico Luzzi defeated Ville Liukko (FIN) in 2001 Europe/Africa Zone Group I, quarterfinals	
Longest tie duration	13 hours, 45 minutes	Italy defeated Poland in 2004 Europe/Africa Zone Group II, Final	
Longest tie-break	30 points (16–14)	Paolo Lorenzi defeated Marco Chiudinelli (SUI) in 2016 World Group, first round	
Longest final set	28 games (15–13)	Nestor / Pospisil (CAN) defeated Bracciali / Fognini in 2013 World Group, quarterfinals	
Most games in a set	38 (20–18)	Alex Olmedo (USA) defeated Orlando Sirola in 1958 Inter-zonal Final	
Most games in a rubber	79	Barry MacKay (tennis) (USA) defeated Nicola Pietrangeli in 1960 Inter-zonal Final	
Most games in a tie	281	Italy defeated United States in 1960 Inter-zonal Final	
Most decisive victory (best of 5 rubbers)	15 sets (15–0)	Italy defeated Monaco in 1968 Europe Zone A, quarterfinals	
Most decisive victory (best of 3 rubbers)	4 sets (6–2)	Italy defeated Croatia in 2022 Davis Cup Finals, Group A	
Longest winning run	9 ties	1976 Europe Zone B, preliminary round Quarterfinal – 1977 Inter-zonal Semifinal (from 30 April 1976 until 16 September 1977)	

=== Most ties and wins ===
As of 15 September 2024

Most ties played
Rank	Player	Ties
1	Nicola Pietrangeli	66
2	Orlando Sirola	46
3	Adriano Panatta	38
4	Giorgio de Stefani	34
4	Simone Bolelli	34
6	Corrado Barazzutti	32
6	Paolo Bertolucci	32
8	Fabio Fognini	30
9	Uberto De Morpurgo	28
10	Giovanni Cucelli	27
10	Andreas Seppi	27

Most rubbers won
Rank	Player	Wins
1	Nicola Pietrangeli	120
2	Adriano Panatta	64
3	Orlando Sirola	57
4	Uberto De Morpurgo	55
5	Giorgio de Stefani	44
6	Corrado Barazzutti	41
7	Giovanni Cucelli	38
8	Fabio Fognini	35
9	Paolo Bertolucci	30
10	Fausto Gardini	29

Highest win percentage (Note: Minimum 20 rubbers played)
Rank	Player	W-L	W%
1	Potito Starace	21–6	77.8%
2	Fausto Gardini	29–9	76.3%
3	Paolo Bertolucci	30–10	75%
4	Nicola Pietrangeli	120–44	73.2%
5	Giuseppe Merlo	25–10	71.4%
6	Uberto De Morpurgo	55–24	69.6%
7	Giovanni Cucelli	38–17	69.1%
8	Giorgio de Stefani	44–22	66.7%
9	Corrado Barazzutti	41–21	66.1%
10	Marcello del Bello	28–15	65.1%

== Performance timeline ==
The Italian team has participated in 91 editions of the Davis Cup since 1922.

Key
W	F	SF	QF	#R	RR	Z#	PO	A	NH	P

(W) winner; (F) finalist; (SF) semifinalist; (QF) quarterfinalist; (#R) rounds 4, 3, 2, 1; (RR) round-robin stage; (A) absent; (Z#) Davis Cup Zonal Group (with number indication) or (PO) play-off; (P) postponed or continued into following year; (NH) not held.
To avoid confusion and double counting, these charts are updated at the conclusion of a tournament or when the team's participation has ended.

1921–1940	Challenge Round era																			
Part	21	22	23	24	25	26	27	28	29	30	31	32	33	34	35	36	37	38	39	40
17	A	2R	2R	2R	2R	2R	3R	SF	3R	SF	3R	QF	3R	3R	2R	A	3R	3R	3R	NH
1941–1960	Challenge Round era																			
Part	41	42	43	44	45	46	47	48	49	50	51	52	53	54	55	56	57	58	59	60
13	NH	NH	NH	NH	NH	A	A	4R	SF	4R	4R	SF	4R	3R	SF	QF	5R	SF	QF	F
1961–1980	Challenge Round era											Zonal								
Part	61	62	63	64	65	66	67	68	69	70	71	72	73	74	75	76	77	78	79	80
20	F	QF	1R	3R	3R	3R	3R	QF	3R	1R	2R	3R	QF	SF	2R	W	F	2R	F	F
1981–2000	World Group																			
Part	81	82	83	84	85	86	87	88	89	90	91	92	93	94	95	96	97	98	99	00
20	1R	QF	QF	QF	1R	QF	1R	QF	1R	QF	1R	QF	QF	1R	QF	SF	SF	F	1R	1R
2001–2020	World Group																		DCF	
Part	01	02	03	04	05	06	07	08	09	10	11	12	13	14	15	16	17	18	19	20
20	PO	Z2	Z2	Z3	PO	PO	PO	Z2	PO	PO	PO	1R	QF	SF	1R	QF	QF	QF	RR	P
2021–2040	Davis Cup Finals																			
Part	21	22	23	24	25															
4	QF	SF	W	W	W															

== Record ==
Since Italy's debut in 1922, they have played against 48 nations with a winning record against 36 nations.

As of 9 July 2024, Italy has a perfect 100% winning record against 19 nations. The best of these is against Poland, achieving 100% of wins after 9 ties. Italy has not won a tie against three nations. The worst of these is against Canada, as they have been unable to record a win after four ties.

== Results ==
=== Key to eras and positions result ===
- Challenge Round era (until 1971): the previous Davis Cup Champion would have a bye to and host the Challenge Round Final. Thus the losing team in the Final (or Inter-zonal final) was the third-placed team. For the purposes of this table, the third placed team is grouped as semifinalists and the Zonal finalists (fourth and fifth placed teams) are grouped as quarterfinalists.
- 1972–1980: the previous Davis Cup Champion now had to compete in all rounds. There were four zones consisting of America, Eastern, Europe A and Europe B, with the competition culminating in a four team knockout between zonal winners. The zonal finalists were the equivalent of Davis Cup quarterfinalists.
- Since 1981: World Group (1981–2018), Davis Cup Finals (from 2019) consisting of 16 or 18 teams.
- Abbreviations: POW = Winner of World Group Playoff (1981–2018); POL = Lost in World Group Playoff (1981–2018); GS = Did not advance past the Group Stage of the Davis Cup Finals (from 2019); DNQ = Did not qualify for World Group Playoff

=== Results table ===
Result	Total	Challenge Round era (until 1971)		Post-Challenge Round era			
Result	Total	Challenge Round era (until 1971)		1972–1980		Since 1981	
Result	Total	#	Years	#	Years	#	Years
Champions	4	0	—	1	1976	3	2023, 2024, 2025
Runners-Up	6	2	1960, 1961	3	1977, 1979, 1980	1	1998
Semifinalists	11	6	1928, 1930, 1949, 1952, 1955, 1958	1	1974	4	1996, 1997, 2014, 2022
Quarterfinalists	20	5	1932, 1956, 1959, 1962, 1968	1	1973	14	1982, 1983, 1984, 1986, 1988, 1990, 1992, 1993, 1995, 2013, 2016, 2017, 2018, 2020–21
Other results
Not in Top 5 (Note: Challenge Round era (1905–1971) only) or Zonal Final; (Note: 1972–1980); Lost in First Round (Note: World Group (1981–2018) only); Group Stage (Note: Davis Cup Finals (from 2019) only)	41	28	1922, 1923, 1924, 1925, 1926, 1927, 1929, 1931, 1933, 1934, 1935, 1937, 1938, 1939, 1948, 1950, 1951, 1953, 1954, 1957, 1963, 1964, 1965, 1966, 1967, 1969, 1970, 1971	2	1975, 1978	11	POW (9): 1981, 1985, 1987, 1989, 1991, 1994, 1999, 2012, 2015 POL (1): 2000 GS (1): 2019
Not in World Group or Davis Cup Finals	11	—		—		11	POW (1): 2011 POL (6): 2001, 2005, 2006, 2007, 2009, 2010 DNQ (4): 2001, 2003, 2004, 2008

== Winning teams ==
1976

- Adriano Panatta
- Corrado Barazzutti
- Paolo Bertolucci
- Tonino Zugarelli
- Cap. Nicola Pietrangeli

2023

- Jannik Sinner
- Lorenzo Musetti
- Matteo Arnaldi
- Simone Bolelli
- Lorenzo Sonego
- Cap. Filippo Volandri

2024

- Jannik Sinner
- Lorenzo Musetti
- Matteo Berrettini
- Simone Bolelli
- Andrea Vavassori
- Cap. Filippo Volandri

2025

- Flavio Cobolli
- Matteo Berrettini
- Lorenzo Sonego
- Simone Bolelli
- Andrea Vavassori
- Cap. Filippo Volandri

== See also ==
- List of Italy Davis Cup team representatives
- Italy Billie Jean King Cup team
- Italy at the Hopman Cup
- Tennis in Italy
- Italian Tennis and Padel Federation
- List of Davis Cup champions
