= 1980 Davis Cup =

1980 edition of the Davis Cup

Details
- Duration: August 1979 – 7 December 1980
- Edition: 69th
- Teams: 51

Champion
- Winning nation: Czechoslovakia

The 1980 Davis Cup was the 69th edition of the Davis Cup, the most important tournament between national teams in men's tennis. 52 teams would enter the competition, 30 in the Europe Zone, 12 in the Americas Zone, and 10 in the Eastern Zone.

Argentina defeated the United States in the Americas Inter-Zonal final, Australia defeated New Zealand in the Eastern Zone final, and Italy and Czechoslovakia were the winners of the two Europe Zones, defeating Sweden and Romania respectively.

In the Inter-Zonal Zone, Czechoslovakia defeated Argentina and Italy defeated Australia in the semifinals. Czechoslovakia then defeated Italy in the final to win their first title and become the eighth nation to win the Davis Cup. The final was held at the Sportovní hala in Prague, Czechoslovakia on 5–7 December.

== Americas Zone ==
=== North & Central America Zone ===
==== Preliminary rounds ====
First Round
Mexico
bye
Kingston, Jamaica (indoor hard)
Caribbean/West Indies	0
Canada	5
Venezuela
bye
bye
Colombia

Qualifying Round
Brantford, Canada (indoor hard)
Mexico	4
Canada	1
Caracas, Venezuela
Venezuela	4
Colombia	1

==== Main Draw ====
Semifinals; 7–9 December 1979
United States
bye
Mexico City, Mexico (clay)
Mexico	4
Venezuela	1

Final; 22–24 February
Mexico City, Mexico (clay)
United States	3
Mexico	2

=== South America Zone ===
==== Preliminary rounds ====
First Round
Chile
bye
Lima, Peru
Uruguay	4
Peru	0
Ecuador
bye
bye
Brazil

Qualifying Round
Montevideo, Uruguay
Chile	4
Uruguay	1
Guayaquil, Ecuador (clay)
Ecuador	2
Brazil	3

==== Main Draw ====
Semifinals; 14–16 December 1979
São Paulo, Brazil
Chile	1
Brazil	3
bye
Argentina

Final; February 1980
São Paulo, Brazil (clay)
Brazil	1
Argentina	4

=== Americas Inter-Zonal Final ===
Argentina vs. United States

Argentina
4
Buenos Aires Lawn Tennis Club, Buenos Aires, Argentina
7–9 March 1980
Clay

United States
1

			1	2	3	4	5
1	(Argentina) (United States)	José Luis Clerc; John McEnroe	6; 3	6; 2	4; 6	13; 11
2	(Argentina) (United States)	Guillermo Vilas; Brian Gottfried	7; 5	6; 4	6; 3
3	(Argentina) (United States)	Ricardo Cano / Carlos Gattiker; Peter Fleming / John McEnroe	0; 6	1; 6	4; 6
4	(Argentina) (United States)	Guillermo Vilas; John McEnroe	6; 2	4; 6	6; 3	2; 6	6; 4
5	(Argentina) (United States)	José Luis Clerc; Brian Gottfried	7; 5	6; 4

== Eastern Zone ==
=== Preliminary rounds ===
Pre-qualifying round
Chinese Taipei
bye
Philippines
Thailand	w/o
Seoul, South Korea
South Korea	3
Pakistan	2
bye
Indonesia

Preliminary round
Guam (hard)
Chinese Taipei	3
Thailand	2
Seoul, South Korea
South Korea	5
Indonesia	0

=== Main Draw ===
Quarterfinals; 7–10 December 1979
Australia
bye
Taipei, Taiwan (indoor hard)
Japan	5
Chinese Taipei	0
Seoul, South Korea
South Korea	3
India	2
bye
New Zealand

Semifinals; 8–10 February
Hobart, Australia (carpet)
Australia	5
Japan	0
Christchurch, New Zealand (grass)
South Korea	0
New Zealand	5

Final; 7–9 March
Brisbane, Australia (grass)
Australia	3
New Zealand	1

=== Final ===
Australia vs. New Zealand

Australia
3
Milton Courts, Brisbane, Australia
7–9 March 1980
Grass

New Zealand
1

			1	2	3	4	5
1	(Australia) (New Zealand)	John Alexander; Chris Lewis	7; 5	7; 9	10; 8	4; 6	5; 7
2	(Australia) (New Zealand)	Phil Dent; Onny Parun	6; 2	5; 7	6; 3	3; 6	6; 2
3	(Australia) (New Zealand)	John Alexander / Phil Dent; Chris Lewis / Russell Simpson	6; 2	8; 6	9; 7
4	(Australia) (New Zealand)	Phil Dent; Chris Lewis	6; 4	6; 3	6; 2
5	(Australia) (New Zealand)	John Alexander; Onny Parun						not played

== Europe Zone ==
=== Zone A ===
==== Pre-qualifying round ====
Pre-qualifying round
Mondorf-les-Bains, Luxembourg
Luxembourg	1
Turkey	4

==== Preliminary rounds ====
First Round
Ramat HaSharon, Israel (hard)
Israel	4
Monaco	1
bye
Switzerland
Dublin, Ireland
Ireland	2
Bulgaria	3
bye
Hungary
Spain
bye
Hilversum, Netherlands (clay)
Netherlands	3
Denmark	2
West Germany
bye
Oslo, Norway (clay)
Norway	4
Turkey	1

Qualifying Round
Winterthur, Switzerland
Israel	1
Switzerland	4
Sofia, Bulgaria
Bulgaria	1
Hungary	3
Seville, Spain
Spain	4
Netherlands	1
Hanover, West Germany (clay)
West Germany	4
Norway	0

==== Main Draw ====
Quarterfinals; 7–9 March
Italy
bye
Zürich, Switzerland
Switzerland	3
Hungary	2
Valencia, Spain
Spain	2
West Germany	3
bye
Sweden

Semifinals; 10–15 June
Turin, Italy (clay)
Italy	5
Switzerland	0
Båstad, Sweden (clay)
West Germany	1
Sweden	4

Final; 11–13 July
Rome, Italy (clay)
Italy	4
Sweden	1

==== Final ====
Italy vs. Sweden

Italy
4
Foro Italico, Rome, Italy
11–13 July 1980
Clay

Sweden
1

			1	2	3	4	5
1	(Italy) (Sweden)	Corrado Barazzutti; Kjell Johansson	6; 3	6; 3	6; 2
2	(Italy) (Sweden)	Adriano Panatta; Stefan Simonsson	6; 8	6; 1	2; 6	6; 4	4; 6
3	(Italy) (Sweden)	Paolo Bertolucci / Adriano Panatta; Hans Simonsson / Stefan Simonsson	6; 2	6; 3	7; 5
4	(Italy) (Sweden)	Adriano Panatta; Kjell Johansson	3; 6	6; 3	6; 4	1; 6	6; 4
5	(Italy) (Sweden)	Corrado Barazzutti; Stefan Simonsson	8; 6	6; 1

=== Zone B ===
==== Pre-qualifying round ====
Pre-qualifying round
Paris, France (clay)
Algeria	1
Morocco	4

==== Preliminary rounds ====
First Round
Casablanca, Morocco
Morocco	1
Belgium	4
bye
Austria
Belgrade, Yugoslavia (clay)
Yugoslavia	5
Portugal	0
bye
Romania
France
bye
Athens, Greece
Soviet Union	5
Greece	0
Poland
bye
Helsinki, Finland
Finland	5
Egypt	0

Qualifying Round
Brussels, Belgium
Belgium	2
Austria	3
Zagreb, Yugoslavia (indoor hard)
Yugoslavia	0
Romania	5
Montpellier, France (indoor carpet)
France	3
Soviet Union	2
Helsinki, Finland
Poland	0
Finland	5

==== Main Draw ====
Quarterfinals; 7–9 March
Great Britain
bye
Bucharest, Romania (indoor hard)
Austria	2
Romania	3
Toulouse, France (indoor carpet)
France	3
Finland	2
bye
Czechoslovakia

Semifinals; 13–16 June
Bristol, United Kingdom (grass)
Great Britain	2
Romania	3
Prague, Czechoslovakia
France	0
Czechoslovakia	5

Final; 11–13 July
Bucharest, Romania (clay)
Romania	1
Czechoslovakia	4

==== Final ====
Romania vs. Czechoslovakia

Romania
1
Bucharest, Romania
11–13 July 1980
Clay

Czechoslovakia
4

			1	2	3	4	5
1	(Romania) (Czechoslovakia)	Dumitru Hărădău; Ivan Lendl	4; 6	1; 6	3; 6
2	(Romania) (Czechoslovakia)	Florin Segărceanu; Pavel Složil	3; 6	3; 6	1; 6
3	(Romania) (Czechoslovakia)	Dumitru Hărădău / Florin Segărceanu; Jan Kodeš / Ivan Lendl	3; 6	2; 6	4; 6
4	(Romania) (Czechoslovakia)	Eduard Pană; Pavel Složil	5; 7	0; 6
5	(Romania) (Czechoslovakia)	Florin Segărceanu; Stanislav Birner	2; 6	6; 2	8; 6

== Inter-Zonal Zone ==
=== Draw ===
Semifinals; 19–21 September
Buenos Aires, Argentina (clay)
AME	Argentina	2
EUR-B	Czechoslovakia	3
Rome, Italy (clay)
EAS	Australia	2
EUR-A	Italy	3

Final; 5–7 December
Prague, Czechoslovakia (indoor carpet)
EUR-B	Czechoslovakia	4
EUR-A	Italy	1

=== Semifinals ===
Argentina vs. Czechoslovakia

Argentina
2
Buenos Aires Lawn Tennis Club, Buenos Aires, Argentina
19–21 September 1980
Clay

Czechoslovakia
3

			1	2	3	4	5
1	(Argentina) (Czechoslovakia)	José Luis Clerc; Pavel Složil	6; 3	3; 6	4; 6	6; 2	6; 1
2	(Argentina) (Czechoslovakia)	Guillermo Vilas; Ivan Lendl	5; 7	6; 8	7; 9
3	(Argentina) (Czechoslovakia)	José Luis Clerc / Guillermo Vilas; Tomáš Šmíd / Ivan Lendl	2; 6	4; 6	3; 6
4	(Argentina) (Czechoslovakia)	José Luis Clerc; Ivan Lendl	1; 6	5; 7	8; 6	2; 6
5	(Argentina) (Czechoslovakia)	Guillermo Vilas; Pavel Složil	6; 2	6; 2

Italy vs. Australia

Italy
3
Foro Italico, Rome, Italy
19–21 September 1980
Clay

Australia
2

			1	2	3	4	5
1	(Italy) (Australia)	Adriano Panatta; Paul McNamee	5; 7	6; 4	6; 0	6; 4
2	(Italy) (Australia)	Corrado Barazzutti; Peter McNamara	8; 10	6; 1	4; 6	2; 6
3	(Italy) (Australia)	Paolo Bertolucci / Adriano Panatta; Peter McNamara / Paul McNamee	2; 6	9; 7	9; 7	2; 6	6; 4
4	(Italy) (Australia)	Adriano Panatta; Peter McNamara	6; 1	7; 5	6; 4
5	(Italy) (Australia)	Corrado Barazzutti; Rod Frawley	6; 2	4; 6	6; 8

=== Final ===
Czechoslovakia vs. Italy

Czechoslovakia
4
Sportovní hala, Prague, Czechoslovakia
5–7 December 1980
Carpet (indoors)

Italy
1

			1	2	3	4	5
1	(Czechoslovakia) (Italy)	Tomáš Šmíd; Adriano Panatta	3; 6	3; 6	6; 3	6; 4	6; 4
2	(Czechoslovakia) (Italy)	Ivan Lendl; Corrado Barazzutti	4; 6	6; 1	6; 1	6; 2
3	(Czechoslovakia) (Italy)	Ivan Lendl / Tomáš Šmíd; Paolo Bertolucci / Adriano Panatta	3; 6	6; 3	3; 6	6; 3	6; 4
4	(Czechoslovakia) (Italy)	Tomáš Šmíd; Corrado Barazzutti	6; 3	3; 6	2; 6
5	(Czechoslovakia) (Italy)	Ivan Lendl; Gianni Ocleppo	6; 3	6; 3
