= Roh Gap-taik =

South Korean tennis player

- Country (sports): South Korea
- Born: 3 May 1964 (age 61) Gyeonggi-do, South Korea
- Height: 5 ft 8 in (173 cm)
- Plays: Right-handed

Singles
- Career record: 0–2 (ATP Tour)
- Career titles: 1 (ATP Challenger)
- Highest ranking: No. 294 (15 May 1989)

Doubles
- Highest ranking: No. 451 (21 June 1993)

Roh Gap-taik (born 3 May 1964) is a Korean former professional tennis player.

Born in Gyeonggi-do, Roh appeared in a total of five Davis Cup ties for South Korea and was a member of the gold medal-winning Korean team at the 1986 Asian Games. In his Davis Cup career, between 1985 and 1988, he played in eight singles rubbers and was only beaten once.

Roh, a right-handed player, twice received a wildcard into the main draw of the Korea Open in Seoul, which were his only ATP Tour appearances. He won a Challenger title in Guangzhou in 1988, despite qualifying for the event as a lucky loser.

Since retiring he has had multiple stints serving as South Korea's Davis Cup captain.

== Challenger titles ==
=== Singles: (1) ===
| Date | Tournament | Surface | Opponent | Score |
|---|---|---|---|---|
| 13 November 1988 | Guangzhou, China | Hard | (Australia) Peter Carter | 7–5, 6–2 |

== See also ==
- List of South Korea Davis Cup team representatives
