= Jeon Young-dai =

South Korean tennis player

- Country (sports): South Korea
- Born: 4 October 1960 (age 64); Chungmu, South Korea
- Height: 6 ft 0 in (183 cm)
- Plays: Right-handed
Medal record
Universiade
Bronze medal – third place	1981 Bucharest	Mixed doubles
Asian Games
Silver medal – second place	1982 Delhi	Men's doubles

Jeon Young-dai (born 4 October 1960) is a South Korean former professional tennis player.

Born in Chungmu, Jeon didn't take up tennis until his second year of middle school and was first selected to South Korea's national team as a 17-year old. In the 1980 Davis Cup tournament he helped South Korea win ties against Pakistan, Indonesia and India. He won a silver medal in men's doubles at the 1982 Asian Games in New Delhi (with Song Dong-wook). After retiring he became a coach and had a successful reign in charge of Konkuk University, which dominated the national college championships. He also became South Korea's national coach.

== See also ==
- List of South Korea Davis Cup team representatives
