= Kim Choon-ho =

South Korean tennis player

- Full name: Kim Choon-ho
- Country (sports): South Korea
- Born: 2 September 1960 (age 64); Namwon, South Korea
- Height: 163 cm (5 ft 4 in)

Singles
- Highest ranking: No. 456 (23 June 1986)

Doubles
- Highest ranking: No. 488 (27 July 1987)

Kim Choon-ho (born 2 September 1960) is a former professional tennis player from South Korea.

== Biography ==
Kim featured in eight Davis Cup ties for South Korea, including a World Group playoff against Italy in 1981, registering a five-set win over Corrado Barazzutti.

At the 1982 Asian Games he won three medals, a gold in both the men's and mixed doubles, as well as a silver in the singles.

He is a former non-playing captain of the South Korea Davis Cup team.

== See also ==
- List of South Korea Davis Cup team representatives
