= South Korea Davis Cup team =

National sports team

Korea, Republic of
- Other names: South Korea
- Captain: Heesung Chung
- Nations Ranking: 14 ▲ (21 September 2026)
- Colors: red & white
- First year: 1960
- Years played: 64
- Ties played (W–L): 129 (58–71)
- Years in World Group: 9 (4–12)
- Best finish: Quarter-finals* (2026)
- Most total wins: Hyung-Taik Lee (51–24)
- Most singles wins: Hyung-Taik Lee (41–9)
- Most doubles wins: Jin-Sun Yoo (10–6); Hyung-Taik Lee (10–15)
- Best doubles team: Jin-Sun Yoo and Bong-Soo Kim (5–1)
- Most ties played: Hyung-Taik Lee (31)
- Most years played: Hyung-Taik Lee (15)

The South Korea men's national tennis team represents South Korea (officially the Republic of Korea) in Davis Cup tennis competition and are governed by the Korea Tennis Association.

In 2020, South Korea will compete in World Group I.

== History ==
South Korea competed in its first Davis Cup in 1960.

== Results and fixtures ==
The following are lists of match results and scheduled matches for the current year.

Win Loss Fixture

=== 2025 ===
2025 Davis Cup Qualifiers first round

Czech Republic
4
RT Torax Arena, Ostrava, Czech Republic
31 January–1 February 2025
Hard (i)

South Korea
0

			1	2	3
1	(Czech Republic) (South Korea)	Jiří Lehečka; Gerard Campaña Lee	6; 3	6; 3
2	(Czech Republic) (South Korea)	Tomáš Macháč; Kwon Soon-woo	6; 2	6; 2
3	(Czech Republic) (South Korea)	Tomáš Macháč / Jakub Menšík; Chung Yun-seong / Nam Ji-sung	6; 3	6; 1
4	(Czech Republic) (South Korea)	Maxim Mrva; Shin San-hui	7^{7} 6^{4}	7^{7} 6^{5}
5	(Czech Republic) (South Korea)	Tomáš Macháč; Gerard Campaña Lee				not played

2025 Davis Cup World Group I

South Korea
3
Chuncheon Songam Sports Park, Chuncheon, South Korea
12–13 September 2025
Hard

Kazakhstan
1

			1	2	3
1	(South Korea) (Kazakhstan)	Chung Hyeon; Alexander Shevchenko	4; 6	3; 6
2	(South Korea) (Kazakhstan)	Kwon Soon-woo; Alexander Bublik	7^{8} 6^{6}	3; 0		retired
3	(South Korea) (Kazakhstan)	Nam Ji-sung / Park Ui-sung; Timofey Skatov / Beibit Zhukayev	6; 2	6; 3
4	(South Korea) (Kazakhstan)	Chung Hyeon; Dmitry Popko	6; 3	7; 5
5	(South Korea) (Kazakhstan)	Kwon Soon-woo; Alexander Shevchenko				not played

=== 2026 ===
2026 Davis Cup Qualifiers first round

South Korea
3
Gijang Gymnasium, Busan, South Korea
7–8 February 2026
Hard (i)

Argentina
2

			1	2	3
1	(South Korea) (Argentina)	Chung Hyeon; Thiago Agustín Tirante	6; 2	5; 7	6^{5} 7^{7}
2	(South Korea) (Argentina)	Kwon Soon-woo; Marco Trungelliti	7^{8} 6^{6}	6; 2
3	(South Korea) (Argentina)	Nam Ji-sung / Park Ui-sung; Guido Andreozzi / Federico Agustín Gómez	3; 6	5; 7
4	(South Korea) (Argentina)	Kwon Soon-woo; Thiago Agustín Tirante	6; 4	4; 6	6; 3
5	(South Korea) (Argentina)	Chung Hyeon; Marco Trungelliti	6; 4	6; 3

2026 Davis Cup Qualifiers second round

South Korea
3
Seoul Olympic Park Tennis Center, Seoul, South Korea
18–19 September 2026
Hard

India
1

			1	2	3
1	(South Korea) (India)	Kwon Soon-woo; Dhakshineswar Suresh	3; 6	6; 3	6; 4
2	(South Korea) (India)	Chung Hyeon; Sumit Nagal	2; 6	6; 4	7; 5
3	(South Korea) (India)	Nam Ji-sung / Park Ui-sung; Sriram Balaji / Dhakshineswar Suresh	3; 6	6; 3	3; 6
4	(South Korea) (India)	Kwon Soon-woo; Sumit Nagal	6; 1	6; 2
5	(South Korea) (India)	Chung Hyeon; Dhakshineswar Suresh				not played

2026 Davis Cup Finals, Quarterfinals

Italy

SuperTennis Arena, Bologna, Italy
25 November 2026
Hard (i)

South Korea

		1	2	3
1	(Italy) (South Korea)
2	(Italy) (South Korea)
3	(Italy) (South Korea)

== Players ==
=== Current team ===
Players representing South Korea at the 2026 Davis Cup Finals.
Player	Born	ATP Ranking		Debut	Nom	Ties	Win-Loss		
Player	Born	Singles	Doubles	Debut	Nom	Ties	Singles	Doubles	Total
Kwon Soon-woo	2 December 1997 (age 28)	160	—N/a	2017	16	20	17–10	0–1	17–11
Chung Hyeon	19 May 1996 (age 30)	578	—N/a	2014	10	10	13–4	0–2	13–6
Park Ui-sung	27 September 2000 (age 26)	757	293	2025	3	3	0–0	1–2	1–2
Nam Ji-sung	15 August 1993 (age 33)	821	123	2013	18	21	3–3	8–13	11–16
Hong Seong-chan	27 March 1998 (age 28)	1079	—N/a	2015	14	15	4–15	0–2	4–17
Non-playing captain: Chung Jong-sam

== Squad members ==
Active player rankings (in parentheses) as of December 5, 2011; 2011's record is included

Player	Years played	Total W–L	Singles W–L	Doubles W–L
Chung Hong (717)	1 (2011)	0–0	0–0	0–0
Cho Soong-Jae (630)	1 (2011)	2–0	1–0	1–0
Im Kyu-tae (492)	8 (2003–2005, 2007–2011)	6–9	5–7	1–2
Jeong Suk-Young (793)	2 (2010–2011)	1–2	1–2	0–0
Kim Hyun-Joon (908)	2 (2010–2011)	3–4	2–1	1–3
Kim Young-Jun (474)	4 (2003–2004, 2010–2011)	6–4	6–3	0–1
Lim Yong-Kyu (288)	3 (2009–2011)	7–6	5–6	2–0
Seol Jae-Min ()	2 (2010-2011)	2–2	0–0	2–2
An Jae-Sung	3 (2005, 2007–2008)	4–3	3–2	1–1
Bae Nam-Ju	2 (1988, 1990)	1–3	0–2	1–1
Baek Se-Hyun	1 (1965)	0–1	0–1	0–0
Baek Seung-Bok	2 (2001–2002)	0–4	0–3	0–1
Chang Eui-jong	6 (1991–1996)	13–11	8–7	5–4
Choi Boo-Kil	4 (1974–1977)	2–4	2–1	0–3
Chung Hee-seok	5 (2002–2006)	14–8	7–3	7–5
Chung Hee-Sung	3 (2000, 2002–2003)	2–3	0–1	2–2
Chung Yong-Ho	8 (1962, 1965, 1968–1969, 1971–1974)	1–18	1–11	0–7
Im Chung-Yang	4 (1964–1967)	2–9	2–5	0–4
Jeon Chang-Dae	3 (1979–1981)	5–5	5–4	0–1
Jeon Young-Dai	7 (1979–1983, 1985–1986)	14–10	11–4	3–6
Ji Seung-ho	2 (1991–1992)	3–3	2–2	1–1
Ju Chang-Nam	4 (1975–1978)	4–8	2–5	2–3
Jun Woong-sun	5 (2004–2008)	12–8	9–5	3–3
Kim Bong-Soo	7 (1984–1990)	18–9	13–8	5–1
Kim Bong-Suk	5 (1977–1981)	2–6	1–3	1–3
Kim Chi-wan	4 (1992–1995)	6–4	1–1	5–3
Kim Choon-ho	6 (1979–1984)	8–11	7–8	1–3
Kim Dong-hyun	7 (1997–1999, 2001–2003, 2005)	5–7	3–4	2–3
Kim Doo-Hwan	8 (1962–1967, 1969, 1971)	2–15	2–11	0–4
Kim Jae-sik	3 (1989–1990, 1992)	5–4	4–2	1–2
Kim Ke-Hwan	1 (1960)	0–1	0–0	0–1
Kim Moon-Il	6 (1968, 1972–1975, 1977)	3–13	2–8	1–5
Kim Nam-Hoon	1 (1998)	1–0	0–0	0–1
Kim Sun-yong	2 (2005, 2007)	3–1	3–1	0–0
Kim Sung-Bae	5 (1971–1975)	4–8	4–6	0–2
Kwon Oh-Hee	3 (2002, 2005–2006)	3–1	1–0	2–1
Lee Ek-Son	1 (1968)	0–1	0–1	0–0
Lee Hyung-taik	14 (1995–2002, 2004–2009)	51–23	41–9	10–14
Lee Jong-min	1 (1996)	0–1	0–0	0–1
Lee Sang-Yoon	3 (1960, 1962–1963)	0–8	0–5	0–3
Lee Tong-Won	1 (1962)	0–1	0–1	0–0
Lee Woo-Ryong	2 (1981, 1983)	1–3	0–3	1–0
Lee Seung-Hoon	2 (2000–2001)	0–3	0–3	0–0
Nam Hyun-woo	1 (2004)	1–0	1–0	0–0
Park Do-Sung	1 (1963)	0–1	0–0	0–1
Roh Gap-taik	3 (1985–1986, 1988)	7–1	7–1	0–0
Shin Han-Cheol	3 (1992–1994)	3–7	2–7	1–0
Song Dong-Wook	8 (1981–1984, 1986–1989)	13–12	7–7	6–5
Song Hyeong-Keun	1 (1999)	0–2	0–2	0–0
Suk Hyun-Jun	1 (2005)	0–2	0–2	0–0
Um Hwa-Yong	1 (1960)	0–2	0–2	0–0
Yoo Jin-Sun	7 (1984–1990)	18–11	8–5	10–6
Yoon Yong-il	9 (1993, 1995–2002)	19–14	16–10	3–4

== Results ==
Year	Group	Round	Most winning players
1960	Eastern Zone	First Round	
1961	Eastern Zone	First Round	
1962	Eastern Zone	First Round	
1963	Eastern Zone	First Round	
1964	Eastern Zone A	First Round	
1965	Eastern Zone A	Final	
1966	Eastern Zone A	First Round	
1967	Eastern Zone A	First Round	
1968	Eastern Zone A	Semifinal	
1969	Eastern Zone A	Semifinal	
1970	Eastern Zone A	First Round	
1971	Americas Zone North & Central America	First Round	
1972	Eastern Zone A	Semifinal	
1973	Eastern Zone	Preliminary round	
1974	Eastern Zone	Preliminary round	
1975	Eastern Zone	Preliminary Round	
1976	Eastern Zone	Preliminary Quarterfinals	
1977	Eastern Zone	Preliminary Semifinals	
1978	Eastern Zone	First Round	
1979	Eastern Zone	Prequalifying Round	
1980	Eastern Zone	Semifinals	
1981	World Group	First Round	
1982	Eastern Zone	Semifinals	
1983	Eastern Zone	Semifinals	
1984	Eastern Zone	Quarterfinals	

== See also ==
- Davis Cup
- South Korea Billie Jean King Cup team
