= Czechoslovakia Davis Cup team =

Czechoslovakia
- Nations Ranking: N/A
- First year: 1921
- Years played: 59
- Ties played (W–L): 149 (92–57)
- Years in World Group: 12 (13–12)
- Davis Cup titles: 1 (1980)
- Runners-up: 1
- Most total wins: Jan Kodeš (60–34)
- Most singles wins: Roderich Menzel (40–12)
- Most doubles wins: Jan Kodeš (21–15)
- Best doubles team: Jaroslav Drobný and Vladimír Černík (11–2)
- Most ties played: Jan Kodeš (39)
- Most years played: Jan Kodeš (15)

The Czechoslovakia men's national tennis team competed from 1921–1992, winning the tournament once, in 1980. From 1993, the nations competed as:

- Czech Republic Davis Cup team (historical records assumed by Czech Republic)
- Slovakia Davis Cup team

== See also ==
- Davis Cup
- Czechoslovakia at the Hopman Cup
