= Davis Cup Tennis =

2002 video game

- North American cover art
- Developer: Hokus Pokus Games
- Publisher: Ubi Soft
- Platform: Game Boy Advance
- Release: EU: June 7, 2002; NA: October 15, 2002
- Genre: Sports
- Modes: Single-player, multiplayer

Davis Cup Tennis (known in Europe as Davis Cup) is a 2002 tennis video game for the Game Boy Advance developed by Hokus Pokus Games and published by Ubi Soft.

In the game's two game modes, the player assumes control of either a tennis player during a single match or an entire country's team in the Davis Cup, an international competition. Multiplayer is supported through the link cable. The game garnered mixed reviews from critics, who overall felt that it paled in comparison to 2002's Virtua Tennis and earlier versions of Mario Tennis.

== Gameplay ==
The game follows the rules of tennis closely. Each match has a minimum of 5 sets by default. Players are able to control the difficulty of the AI before starting their game as well. The player can either choose to play a "Quick Play" mode which allows for a single tennis match, or to play through the full Davis Cup, where the player must choose the team captain and compete through the entire tournament with the rotating player rotation.

The tennis players are represented by two-dimensional sprites, while the court is given the illusion of being three-dimensional. Players are able to control the power of their initial serve, but cannot control how hard they hit balls already in play.

== Reception ==
Reception

Aggregate score
Aggregator	Score
Metacritic	59/100

Review scores
Publication	Score
GameSpot	6.3 of 10
GameSpy	80/100
GameZone	7 of 10
IGN	5 of 10

Davis Cup Tennis garnered mixed reviews from gaming press, who felt that the game was lackluster compared to Virtua Tennis. GameSpot's Frank Provo and IGN's Craig Harris both criticized the lack of an in-game save option that you could activate during your match, with Craig Harris remarking that the design "isn't exactly handheld friendly". Frank Provo felt that the larger variety of techniques found in Virtua Tennis made it "the better option". GameSpy's Avi Fryman remarked on the game's averageness in comparison to its competitors, commenting "... if all available copies of Virtua Tennis and Mario Tennis suddenly vaporized, there might be a reason for casual gamers to pick this one up."
