= 1902 International Lawn Tennis Challenge =

1902 edition of the International Lawn Tennis Challenge

Details
- Duration: 6 – 8 August 1902
- Edition: 2nd
- Teams: 2

Champion
- Winning nation: United States

The 1902 International Lawn Tennis Challenge was the second edition of what is now known as the Davis Cup. The tie was played at the Crescent Athletic Club in Brooklyn, New York, United States. The Crescent Athletic Club was located at Narrows Avenue and 85th Street, site at present of the Fort Hamilton HS Athletic Field.

== Result ==
United States vs. British Isles

United States
3
Crescent Athletic Club, Brooklyn, NY, United States
6–8 August 1902
Grass

British Isles
2

			1	2	3	4	5
1	(United States) (United Kingdom)	Malcolm Whitman; Joshua Pim	6; 1	6; 1	1; 6	6; 0
2	(United States) (United Kingdom)	William Larned; Reginald Doherty	6; 2	6; 3	3; 6	4; 6	4; 6
3	(United States) (United Kingdom)	Dwight Davis / Holcombe Ward; Laurence Doherty / Reginald Doherty	6; 3	8; 10	3; 6	4; 6
4	(United States) (United Kingdom)	William Larned; Joshua Pim	6; 3	6; 2	6; 3
5	(United States) (United Kingdom)	Malcolm Whitman; Reginald Doherty	6; 1	7; 5	6; 4
