= 1992 Davis Cup World Group =

- Date: 31 January – 6 December
- Edition: 12th

Champions
- United States
- Davis Cup

The World Group was the highest level of Davis Cup competition in 1992. The first-round losers went into the Davis Cup World Group qualifying round, and the winners progressed to the quarterfinals and were guaranteed a World Group spot for 1993.

France were the defending champions, but were eliminated in the quarterfinals.

The United States won the title, defeating Switzerland in the final, 3–1. The final was held at the Tarrant County Convention Center, Fort Worth, Texas, United States, from 4 to 6 December. It was the US team's 30th Davis Cup title overall.

== Participating teams ==
Participating teams
Argentina	Australia	Belgium	Brazil
Canada	Czechoslovakia	France	Germany
Great Britain	Italy	Netherlands	Spain
Sweden	Switzerland	United States	Yugoslavia

== Draw ==
First round 31 January–2 February
Bayonne, France (indoor carpet)
France	5
Great Britain	0
The Hague, Netherlands (indoor carpet)
Netherlands	1
Switzerland	4
Rio de Janeiro, Brazil (clay)
Germany	1
Brazil	3
Bolzano, Italy (indoor carpet)
Spain	1
Italy	4
Nicosia, Cyprus (indoor carpet)
Yugoslavia	0
Australia	5
Vancouver, Canada (indoor carpet)
Canada	2
Sweden	3
Prague, Czechoslovakia (indoor carpet)
Belgium	0
Czechoslovakia	5
Waimea, HI, United States (hard)
Argentina	0
United States	5

Quarterfinals; 27–29 March
Nîmes, France (indoor clay)
France	2
Switzerland	3
Maceió, Brazil (clay)
Brazil	3
Italy	1
Lund, Sweden (indoor carpet)
Australia	0
Sweden	5
Fort Myers, FL, United States (hard)
Czechoslovakia	2
United States	3

Semifinals; 25–27 September
Geneva, Switzerland (indoor carpet)
Switzerland	5
Brazil	0
Minneapolis, MN, United States (indoor clay)
Sweden	1
United States	4

Final; 4–6 December
Fort Worth, TX, United States (indoor hard)
Switzerland	1
United States	3

== First round ==
=== France vs. Great Britain ===
France
5
Salle Lauga, Bayonne, France
31 January–2 February 1992
Carpet (indoors)

Great Britain
0

			1	2	3	4	5
1	(France) (United Kingdom)	Henri Leconte; Jeremy Bates	4; 6	6; 4	6; 2	6; 4
2	(France) (United Kingdom)	Guy Forget; Mark Petchey	4; 6	6; 3	6; 3	6; 3
3	(France) (United Kingdom)	Guy Forget / Henri Leconte; Jeremy Bates / Neil Broad	6; 3	6; 4	4; 6	7^{7} 6^{4}
4	(France) (United Kingdom)	Guy Forget; Jeremy Bates	6; 2	6; 4
5	(France) (United Kingdom)	Henri Leconte; Mark Petchey	6; 1	6; 2

=== Netherlands vs. Switzerland ===
Netherlands
1
Stadion Houtrust, The Hague, Netherlands
31 January–2 February 1992
Carpet (indoors)

Switzerland
4

			1	2	3	4	5
1	(Netherlands) (Switzerland)	Jan Siemerink; Marc Rosset	6^{2} 7^{7}	2; 6	6^{4} 7^{7}
2	(Netherlands) (Switzerland)	Paul Haarhuis; Jakob Hlasek	6; 4	4; 6	3; 6	6^{2} 7^{7}
3	(Netherlands) (Switzerland)	Paul Haarhuis / Mark Koevermans; Jakob Hlasek / Marc Rosset	2; 6	7; 5	3; 6	1; 6
4	(Netherlands) (Switzerland)	Jacco Eltingh; Jakob Hlasek	2; 6	4; 6
5	(Netherlands) (Switzerland)	Paul Haarhuis; Marc Rosset	6; 4	6; 3

=== Brazil vs. Germany ===
Brazil
3
Barra Centre, Rio de Janeiro, Brazil
31 January–2 February 1992
Clay

Germany
1

			1	2	3	4	5
1	(Brazil) (Germany)	Luiz Mattar; Boris Becker	4; 6	7; 5	6; 1	6^{2} 7^{7}	0; 6
2	(Brazil) (Germany)	Jaime Oncins; Carl-Uwe Steeb	6; 3	4; 6	6; 2	7^{7} 6^{5}
3	(Brazil) (Germany)	Cássio Motta / Fernando Roese; Boris Becker / Eric Jelen	7; 5	6; 3	6; 3
4	(Brazil) (Germany)	Jaime Oncins; Markus Zoecke	1; 6	6; 4	7^{7} 6^{3}	2; 6	7; 5
5	(Brazil) (Germany)	Luiz Mattar; Carl-Uwe Steeb						not played

=== Italy vs. Spain ===
Italy
4
Palasport, Bolzano, Italy
31 January–2 February 1992
Carpet (indoors)

Spain
1

			1	2	3	4	5
1	(Italy) (Spain)	Omar Camporese; Sergi Bruguera	6; 4	6; 1	4; 6	6; 1
2	(Italy) (Spain)	Cristiano Caratti; Emilio Sánchez	6^{3} 7^{7}	6; 4	6; 3	5; 7	5; 7
3	(Italy) (Spain)	Omar Camporese / Diego Nargiso; Sergio Casal / Emilio Sánchez	7^{7} 6^{4}	6; 3	6; 4
4	(Italy) (Spain)	Omar Camporese; Emilio Sánchez	6; 0	6; 2	6; 4
5	(Italy) (Spain)	Cristiano Caratti; Sergi Bruguera	6; 4	6^{8} 7^{10}	6; 1

=== Yugoslavia vs. Australia ===
Yugoslavia
0
Lefkotheo, Nicosia, Cyprus
31 January–2 February 1992
Carpet (indoors)

Australia
5

			1	2	3	4	5
1	(Socialist Federal Republic of Yugoslavia) (Australia)	Slobodan Živojinović; Richard Fromberg	6^{6} 7^{8}					retired
2	(Socialist Federal Republic of Yugoslavia) (Australia)	Srđan Muškatirović; Wally Masur	4; 6	1; 6	2; 6
3	(Socialist Federal Republic of Yugoslavia) (Australia)	Nebojša Đorđević / Aleksandar Kitinov; John Fitzgerald / Todd Woodbridge	5; 7	3; 6	6^{2} 7^{7}
4	(Socialist Federal Republic of Yugoslavia) (Australia)	Nebojša Đorđević; Wally Masur	3; 6	0; 6
5	(Socialist Federal Republic of Yugoslavia) (Australia)	Srđan Muškatirović; Richard Fromberg	0; 6	3; 6

=== Canada vs. Sweden ===
Canada
2
Pacific National Agrodome, Vancouver, Canada
31 January–2 February 1992
Carpet (indoors)

Sweden
3

			1	2	3	4	5
1	(Canada) (Sweden)	Grant Connell; Magnus Gustafsson	7^{7} 6^{5}	6; 4	6; 4
2	(Canada) (Sweden)	Daniel Nestor; Stefan Edberg	4; 6	6; 3	1; 6	6; 3	6; 4
3	(Canada) (Sweden)	Grant Connell / Glenn Michibata; Stefan Edberg / Anders Järryd	6; 3	3; 6	4; 6	4; 6
4	(Canada) (Sweden)	Grant Connell; Stefan Edberg	2; 6	2; 6	6^{2} 7^{7}
5	(Canada) (Sweden)	Daniel Nestor; Magnus Gustafsson	4; 6	6; 2	6; 3	5; 7	4; 6

=== Czechoslovakia vs. Belgium ===
Czechoslovakia
5
Sportovní hala, Prague, Czechoslovakia
31 January–2 February 1992
Carpet (indoors)

Belgium
0

			1	2	3	4	5
1	(Czechoslovakia) (Belgium)	Karel Nováček; Bart Wuyts	6^{7} 7^{9}	6^{5} 7^{7}	6; 3	6; 4	6; 4
2	(Czechoslovakia) (Belgium)	Petr Korda; Eduardo Masso	6; 1	7^{7} 6^{0}	6; 3
3	(Czechoslovakia) (Belgium)	Petr Korda / Cyril Suk; Eduardo Masso / Tom Vanhoudt	6; 3	6; 3	6; 3
4	(Czechoslovakia) (Belgium)	Petr Korda; Bart Wuyts	6; 4	7; 5
5	(Czechoslovakia) (Belgium)	Karel Nováček; Eduardo Masso	6; 4	6; 2

=== United States vs. Argentina ===
United States
5
Mauna Lani Racquet Club, Waimea, HI, United States
31 January–2 February 1992
Hard

Argentina
0

			1	2	3	4	5
1	(United States) (Argentina)	Pete Sampras; Martín Jaite	3; 6	6; 4	6; 2	6; 4
2	(United States) (Argentina)	Andre Agassi; Alberto Mancini	6; 4	6; 4	6; 4
3	(United States) (Argentina)	Rick Leach / John McEnroe; Javier Frana / Christian Miniussi	6^{0} 7^{7}	6; 2	6; 2	6; 1
4	(United States) (Argentina)	Pete Sampras; Alberto Mancini	6; 4	6; 1
5	(United States) (Argentina)	Andre Agassi; Martín Jaite	7; 5	6; 3

== Quarterfinals ==
=== France vs. Switzerland ===
France
2
Arena of Nîmes, Nîmes, France
27–29 March 1992
Clay (indoors)

Switzerland
3

			1	2	3	4	5
1	(France) (Switzerland)	Arnaud Boetsch; Jakob Hlasek	6; 3	6^{3} 7^{7}	4; 6	6^{4} 7^{7}
2	(France) (Switzerland)	Thierry Champion; Marc Rosset	4; 6	4; 6	6; 4	2; 6
3	(France) (Switzerland)	Guy Forget / Henri Leconte; Jakob Hlasek / Marc Rosset	4; 6	4; 6	6; 2	7^{7} 6^{5}	6; 4
4	(France) (Switzerland)	Thierry Champion; Jakob Hlasek	3; 6	6; 4	6^{6} 7^{8}	5; 7
5	(France) (Switzerland)	Arnaud Boetsch; Marc Rosset	6; 4	6; 4

=== Brazil vs. Italy ===
Brazil
3
Tennis Park, Maceió, Brazil
27–29 March 1992
Clay

Italy
1

			1	2	3	4	5
1	(Brazil) (Italy)	Luiz Mattar; Omar Camporese	3; 6	7; 5	4; 6	7^{11} 6^{9}	4; 6
2	(Brazil) (Italy)	Jaime Oncins; Paolo Canè	7^{7} 6^{4}	4; 6	5; 7	7; 5	6; 3
3	(Brazil) (Italy)	Cássio Motta / Fernando Roese; Omar Camporese / Diego Nargiso	6; 1	6; 2	5; 7	3; 6	6; 3
4	(Brazil) (Italy)	Jaime Oncins; Stefano Pescosolido	6; 4	6; 3	3; 6	1; 0		retired
5	(Brazil) (Italy)	Luiz Mattar; Paolo Canè						not played

=== Sweden vs. Australia ===
Sweden
5
Victoriastadion, Lund, Sweden
27–29 March 1992
Carpet (indoors)

Australia
0

			1	2	3	4	5
1	(Sweden) (Australia)	Magnus Gustafsson; Wally Masur	7; 5	6; 4	6; 4
2	(Sweden) (Australia)	Stefan Edberg; Richard Fromberg	6; 3	6; 2	6; 3
3	(Sweden) (Australia)	Stefan Edberg / Anders Järryd; John Fitzgerald / Todd Woodbridge	6; 3	6; 3	3; 6	6; 1
4	(Sweden) (Australia)	Stefan Edberg; Wally Masur	6; 4	7^{7} 6^{4}
5	(Sweden) (Australia)	Christian Bergström; Richard Fromberg	6; 4	7; 5

=== United States vs. Czechoslovakia ===
United States
3
Sonesta Sanibel Resort, Fort Myers, FL, United States
27–29 March 1992
Hard

Czechoslovakia
2

			1	2	3	4	5
1	(United States) (Czechoslovakia)	Pete Sampras; Karel Nováček	6; 3	6; 4	6; 2
2	(United States) (Czechoslovakia)	Andre Agassi; Petr Korda	6; 2	6; 4	6; 1
3	(United States) (Czechoslovakia)	Rick Leach / John McEnroe; Petr Korda / Cyril Suk	3; 6	4; 6	4; 6
4	(United States) (Czechoslovakia)	Pete Sampras; Petr Korda	4; 6	3; 6	6; 2	3; 6
5	(United States) (Czechoslovakia)	Andre Agassi; Karel Nováček	7^{7} 6^{5}	6; 0	6; 0

== Semifinals ==
=== Switzerland vs. Brazil ===
Switzerland
5
Palexpo, Geneva, Switzerland
25–27 September 1992
Carpet (indoors)

Brazil
0

			1	2	3	4	5
1	(Switzerland) (Brazil)	Marc Rosset; Jaime Oncins	6; 3	7; 5	7; 5
2	(Switzerland) (Brazil)	Jakob Hlasek; Luiz Mattar	6; 2	6; 3	6^{5} 7^{7}	6; 3
3	(Switzerland) (Brazil)	Jakob Hlasek / Marc Rosset; Cássio Motta / Fernando Roese	6; 3	6; 4	6; 3
4	(Switzerland) (Brazil)	Jakob Hlasek; Jaime Oncins	6; 4	6; 2
5	(Switzerland) (Brazil)	Marc Rosset; Luiz Mattar	7^{7} 6^{2}	6; 3

=== United States vs. Sweden ===
United States
4
Target Center, Minneapolis, MN, United States
25–27 September 1992
Clay (indoors)

Sweden
1

			1	2	3	4	5
1	(United States) (Sweden)	Jim Courier; Nicklas Kulti	4; 6	7^{7} 6^{1}	6; 3	7; 5
2	(United States) (Sweden)	Andre Agassi; Stefan Edberg	5; 7	6; 3	7^{7} 6^{1}	6; 3
3	(United States) (Sweden)	John McEnroe / Pete Sampras; Stefan Edberg / Anders Järryd	6; 1	6^{2} 7^{7}	4; 6	6; 3	6; 3
4	(United States) (Sweden)	Jim Courier; Magnus Larsson	6; 2	6^{6} 7^{8}	6^{5} 7^{7}
5	(United States) (Sweden)	Andre Agassi; Nicklas Kulti	6^{4} 7^{7}	6; 2	6; 4

== Final ==
=== United States vs. Switzerland ===
United States
3
Tarrant County Convention Center, Fort Worth, TX, United States
4–6 December 1992
Hard (indoors)

Switzerland
1

			1	2	3	4	5
1	(United States) (Switzerland)	Andre Agassi; Jakob Hlasek	6; 1	6; 2	6; 2
2	(United States) (Switzerland)	Jim Courier; Marc Rosset	3; 6	7^{11} 6^{9}	6; 3	4; 6	4; 6
3	(United States) (Switzerland)	John McEnroe / Pete Sampras; Jakob Hlasek / Marc Rosset	6^{5} 7^{7}	6^{7} 7^{9}	7; 5	6; 1	6; 2
4	(United States) (Switzerland)	Jim Courier; Jakob Hlasek	6; 3	3; 6	6; 3	6; 4
5	(United States) (Switzerland)	Andre Agassi; Marc Rosset						not played
