= Davis Cup =

Men's tennis international team competition

- Current season, competition or edition: 2026 Davis Cup
- Sport: Tennis
- Founded: 1900; 126 years ago
- Founder: Dwight F. Davis
- No. of teams: 155 (2025)
- Countries: World Tennis member nations
- Continent: Worldwide
- Most recent champions: Italy (4th title)
- Most titles: United States (32 titles)
- Website: daviscup.com

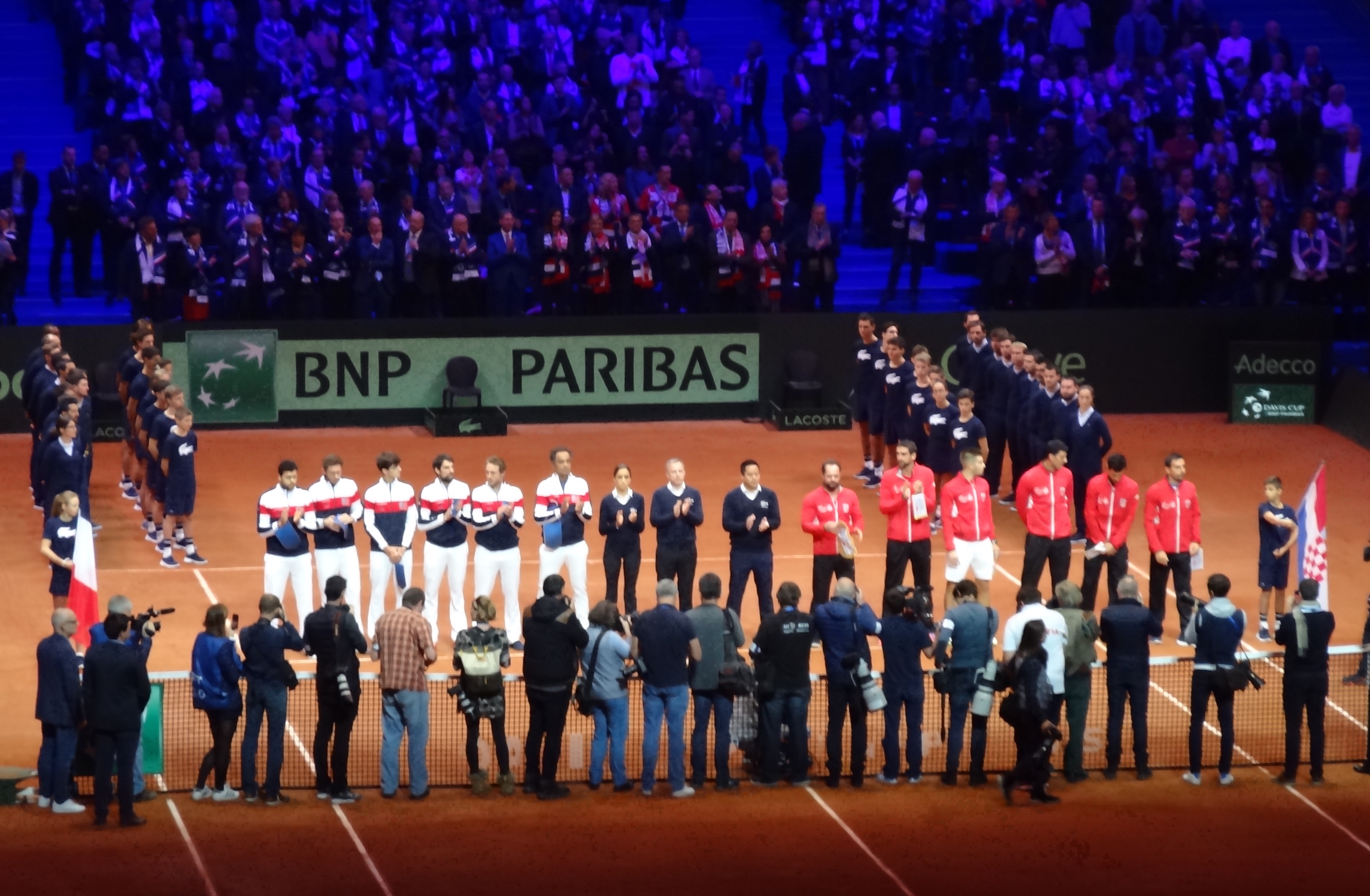
The 2018 Davis Cup Final – opening ceremony.

The Davis Cup is the premier international team event in men's tennis. It is organised by World Tennis and contested annually between teams from over 150 competing countries, making it the world's largest annual team sporting competition. It is described by the organisers as the "World Cup of Tennis" and the winners are referred to as the world champions. The competition began in 1900 as a challenge between Great Britain and the United States. Initially titled the International Lawn Tennis Challenge, it soon became known metonymically after the trophy donated by Dwight F. Davis; the name was officially changed after Davis' death in 1945. By 2023, 155 nations entered teams into the competition.

The most successful country over the history of the competition is the United States (winning 32 titles and finishing as runners-up 29 times). The most recent champions are Italy, who beat Spain to win their fourth title (and third consecutive one) in 2025.

The women's equivalent of the Davis Cup is the Billie Jean King Cup, formerly known as the Federation Cup (1963–1995) and Fed Cup (1995–2020). Australia, Italy, Russia, the Czech Republic and the United States are the only countries to have won both Davis Cup and Federation/Fed/Billie Jean King Cup titles in the same year.

The Davis Cup allowed only amateurs and national registered professional players (from 1968) to compete until 1973, five years after the start of the Open Era.

== History ==
=== Background ===
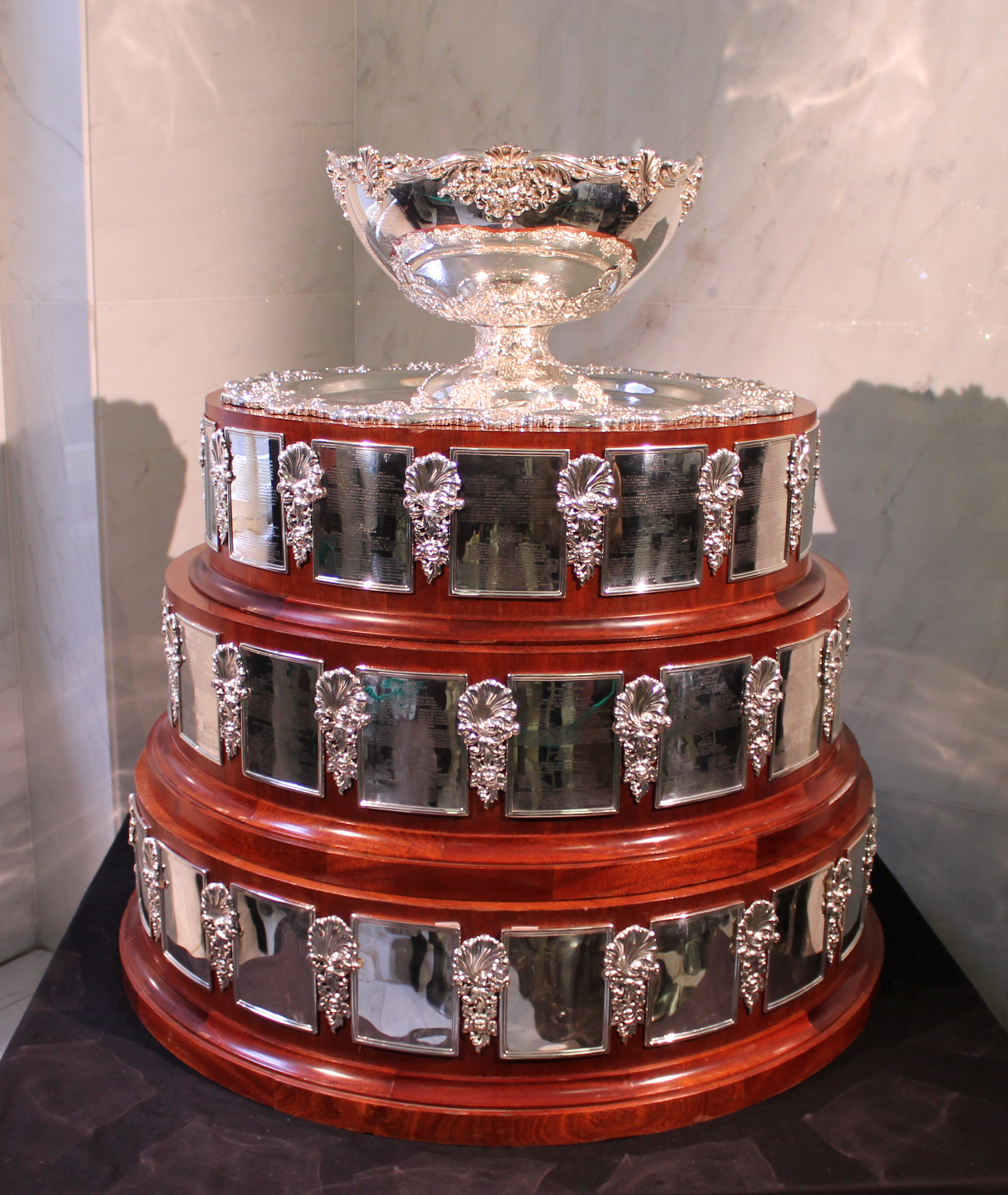
Davis Cup trophy displayed in the Český rozhlas headquarters, Prague-Vinohrady, 2012

The idea for an event pitting the best British and Americans in competition against one another was most likely first conceived by James Dwight, the first president of the U.S. National Lawn Tennis Association when it formed in 1881. Desperate to assess the development of American players against the renowned British champions, he worked tirelessly to engage British officials in a properly sanctioned match, but failed to do so. He nevertheless tried to entice top international (particularly British) talent to the U.S. and sanctioned semi-official tours of the top American players to Great Britain. Diplomatic relations between Great Britain and the United States on the tennis front had strengthened such that, by the mid-1890s, reciprocal tours were staged annually between players of the two nations, and an ensuing friendship between American William Larned and Irishman Harold Mahony spurred efforts to formalize an official team competition between the two nations.

International competitions had been staged for some time before the first Davis Cup match in 1900. From 1892, England and Ireland had been competing in an annual national-team-based competition, similar to what would become the standard Davis Cup format, mixing single and doubles matches, and in 1895 England played against France in a national team competition. During Larned's tour of the British Isles in 1896, where he competed in several tournaments including the Wimbledon Championships, he was also a spectator for the annual England vs. Ireland match.

He returned to exclaim that Britain had agreed to send a group of three to the U.S. the following summer, which would represent the first British lawn tennis "team" to compete in the U.S. Coincidentally, some weeks before Larned left for his British tour, the idea for an international competition was discussed also between leading figures in American lawn tennis—one of whom was tennis journalist E.P. Fischer—at a tournament in Niagara-on-the-Lake, Ontario.

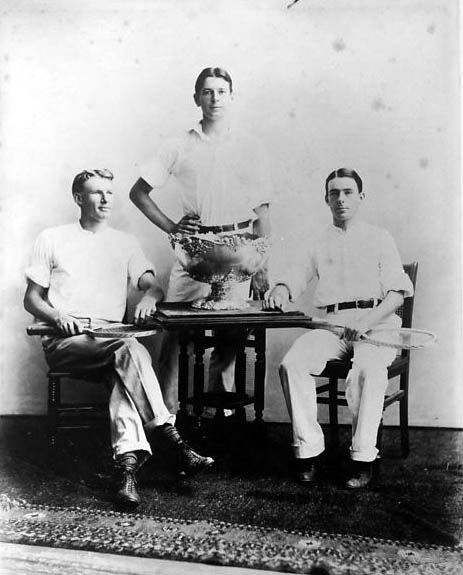
American player Dwight Davis (center) in 1900 with the trophy he committed to build.

Dwight F. Davis was in attendance at this tournament, and was thought to have got wind of the idea as it was discussed in the tournament's popular magazine, and Davis's name was mentioned as someone who might 'do something for the game ... put up some big prize, or cup'. Larned and Fischer met on several occasions that summer and discussed the idea of an international match to be held in Chicago the following summer, pitting six of the best British players against six of the best Americans, in a mixture of singles and doubles matches. This was discussed openly in two articles in the Chicago Tribune, but did not come to fruition.

Nevertheless, the following summer, Great Britain—though not under the official auspices of the Lawn Tennis Association—sent three of its best players to compete in several US tournaments. Their relative poor performances convinced Dwight and other leading officials and figures in American lawn tennis that the time was right for a properly sanctioned international competition. This was to be staged in Newcastle in July 1898, but the event never took place as the Americans could not field a sufficiently strong team. A reciprocal tour to the U.S. in 1899 amounted to just a single British player travelling overseas, as many of the players were involved in overseas armed conflicts.

It was at this juncture, in the summer of 1899, that four members of the Harvard University tennis team—Dwight Davis included—travelled across the States to challenge the best west-coast talent, and upon his return, it apparently occurred to Davis that if teams representing regions could arouse such great feelings, then why wouldn't a tennis event that pitted national teams in competition be just as successful. He approached James Dwight with the idea, which was tentatively agreed, and he ordered an appropriate sterling silver punchbowl trophy from Shreve, Crump & Low, purchasing it from his own funds for about US$1,000. They in turn commissioned a classically styled design from William B. Durgin's of Concord, New Hampshire, crafted by the Englishman Rowland Rhodes.

Beyond donating a trophy for the competition, Davis's involvement in the incipient development of the team competition that came to bear his name was negligible, yet a persistent myth has emerged that Davis devised both the idea for an international tennis competition and its format of mixing singles and doubles matches. Research has shown this to be a myth, similar in its exaggeration of a single individual's efforts within a highly complex long-term development to the myths of William Webb Ellis and Abner Doubleday, who have both been wrongly credited with inventing rugby and baseball, respectively. Davis nevertheless went on to become a prominent politician in the United States in the 1920s, serving as US Secretary of War from 1925 to 1929 and as Governor-General of the Philippines from 1929 to 1932.

=== Challenge format (1900–1971) ===
The first match, between the United States and Britain (competing as the "British Isles"), was held at the Longwood Cricket Club in Boston, Massachusetts in 1900. The American team, of which Dwight Davis was captain, surprised the British by winning the first three matches. The following year the two countries did not compete, but the US won the match in 1902 and Britain won the following four matches. By 1905 the event expanded to include Belgium, Austria, France, and Australasia, a combined team from Australia and New Zealand that competed together until 1914.

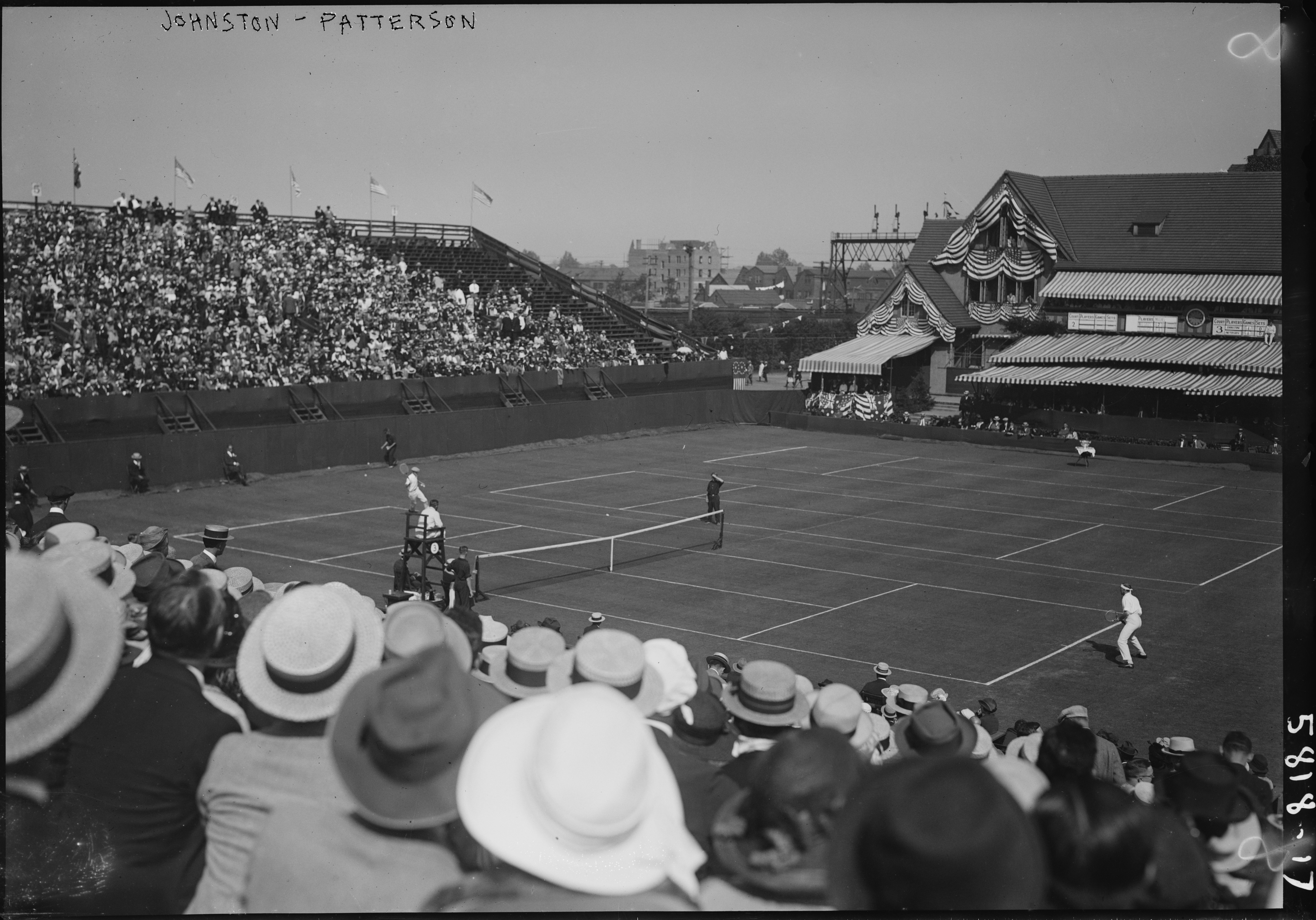
Bill Johnston (US) vs. Gerald Patterson (Australasia) in the Challenge Round at the West Side Tennis Club in 1922

The competition was initially titled the International Lawn Tennis Challenge although it soon became known as the Davis Cup, after Dwight Davis' trophy. The Davis Cup competition was initially played as a challenge cup. All teams competed against one another for the right to face the previous year's champion in the final round.

Beginning in 1923, the world's teams were split into two zones: the "America Zone" and the "Europe Zone". The winners of the two zones met in the Inter-Zonal Zone ("INZ") to decide which national team would challenge the defending champion for the cup. The zone names reflected where the matches were played rather than the nations' home continents; for example, in the 1925 Europe Zone, India lost to Belgium in Brussels, while in the America Zone, Japan played Spain and Australia in the United States. In 1955 a third zone, the "Eastern Zone", was added. Because there were three zones, the winner of one of the three zones received a bye in the first round of the INZ challenger rounds. In 1966, the "Europe Zone" was split into two zones, "Europe Zone A" and "Europe Zone B", so the winners of the four zones competed in the INZ challenger rounds.

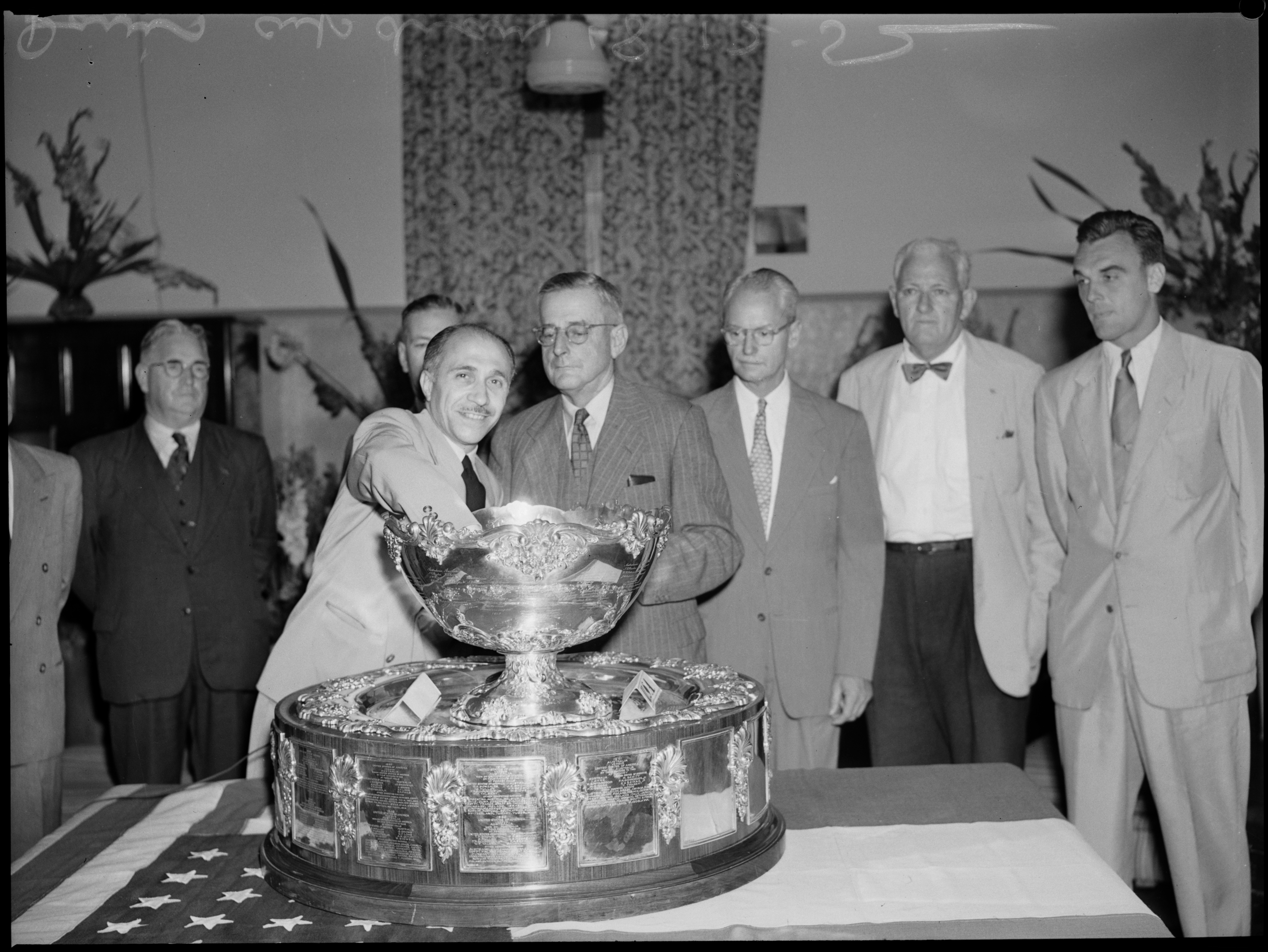
Davis Cup draw, Australia, 1952

From 1950 to 1967, Australia dominated the competition, winning the Cup 15 times in 18 years.

=== Modern format (1972–present) ===
Beginning in 1972, the format was changed to a knockout competition, so that the defending champion was required to compete in all rounds, and the Davis Cup was awarded to the champion.

Up until 1973, the Davis Cup had only ever been won by the United States, Great Britain/British Isles, France and Australia/Australasia. Their domination was eventually broken in 1974 when South Africa and India made the final; however, the final was scratched and South Africa was awarded the cup after India refused to travel to South Africa in protest of South Africa's apartheid policies. The following year saw the first actual final between two "outsider" nations, when Sweden beat Czechoslovakia 3–2, and since then, many other countries have gone on to capture the trophy.

All contract professionals were not allowed to play in the Davis Cup until 1973. The tennis stars who turned professional prior to the Open Era (pre-1968) were not allowed to compete in the Davis Cup despite the fact that the Grand Slam tournaments and most tennis tournaments became Open Era events in 1968. From 1968 national registered professionals were allowed to compete under the control of their national tennis associations. In 1973 Australian players like Rod Laver and Ken Rosewall were allowed to play in the Davis Cup for the first time since 1962 (for Laver) and since 1956 (for Rosewall).

In 1981, a tiered system of competition was created, in which the 16 best national teams compete in the World Group and all other national teams compete in one of four groups in one of three regional zones. The eight losers of the first round of the World Group played in a relegation match, with the winner staying in the next year's world group and the loser relegated to a regional zone. The winner of each regional zone group qualified for the next year's World Group. In 1989, the relegation round was renamed to the "World Group Qualifying Round" and expanded to include a total of 16 teams. The losers of the first round of the World Group were matched against the winners of the regional zone groups, which were each split into two subgroups, and the winner of the match qualified for the subsequent year's World Group. That same year, the tiebreak was introduced into Davis Cup competition, and from 2016 it is used in all five sets.

In 2018, World Tennis (then known as the International Tennis Federation) voted to change the format of the competition from 2019 onwards, changing it to an 18-team event to happen at the end of the season, with 71% of World Tennis member federations voting in favour of the change. The new format, backed by footballer Gerard Piqué and Japanese businessman Hiroshi Mikitani, was likened to a world cup of tennis and was designed to be more attractive to sponsors and broadcasters. Opposing federations included those from Australia, Germany, and Great Britain. Support for the reform was also mixed among current and former players, with some such as Novak Djokovic and Rafael Nadal being in favour of the new format, but others such as Rod Laver, Lucas Pouille and Roger Federer being opposed. On 12 January 2023, World Tennis announced that the partnership with the new promoter would end, and that they would take back control of the Davis Cup.

Davis Cup games have been affected by political protests several times, especially in Sweden:

- The match between Sweden and Rhodesia 1968 was supposed to be played in Båstad but was moved to Bandol, France, due to protests against the Rhodesian white minority government of Ian Smith.
- The Swedish government tried to stop the match between Chile and Sweden in 1975 in Båstad, due to violations of human rights in Chile. The match was played, even while 7,000 people protested against it outside.
- After the 2008–2009 Israel–Gaza conflict, 6,000 people protested against Israel outside the Malmö city Davis Cup match between Sweden and Israel in March 2009. The Malmö Municipality politicians were concerned about extremists, and decided due to security reasons to only let a small audience in.

Russia and Belarus were suspended after the 2022 Russian invasion of Ukraine.

== The Davis Cup Trophy ==
Originally manufactured for a price of £700, today's Davis Cup is made from 217 ounces of silver and standing at 13 inches tall with a diameter of 18 inches, sitting on top of three plinths.

The Davis Cup Trophy is now restored and repaired by Royal Warrant holding goldsmiths and silversmiths, Thomas Lyte.

The trophy is also known by its nickname "Salad Bowl".

== Format ==
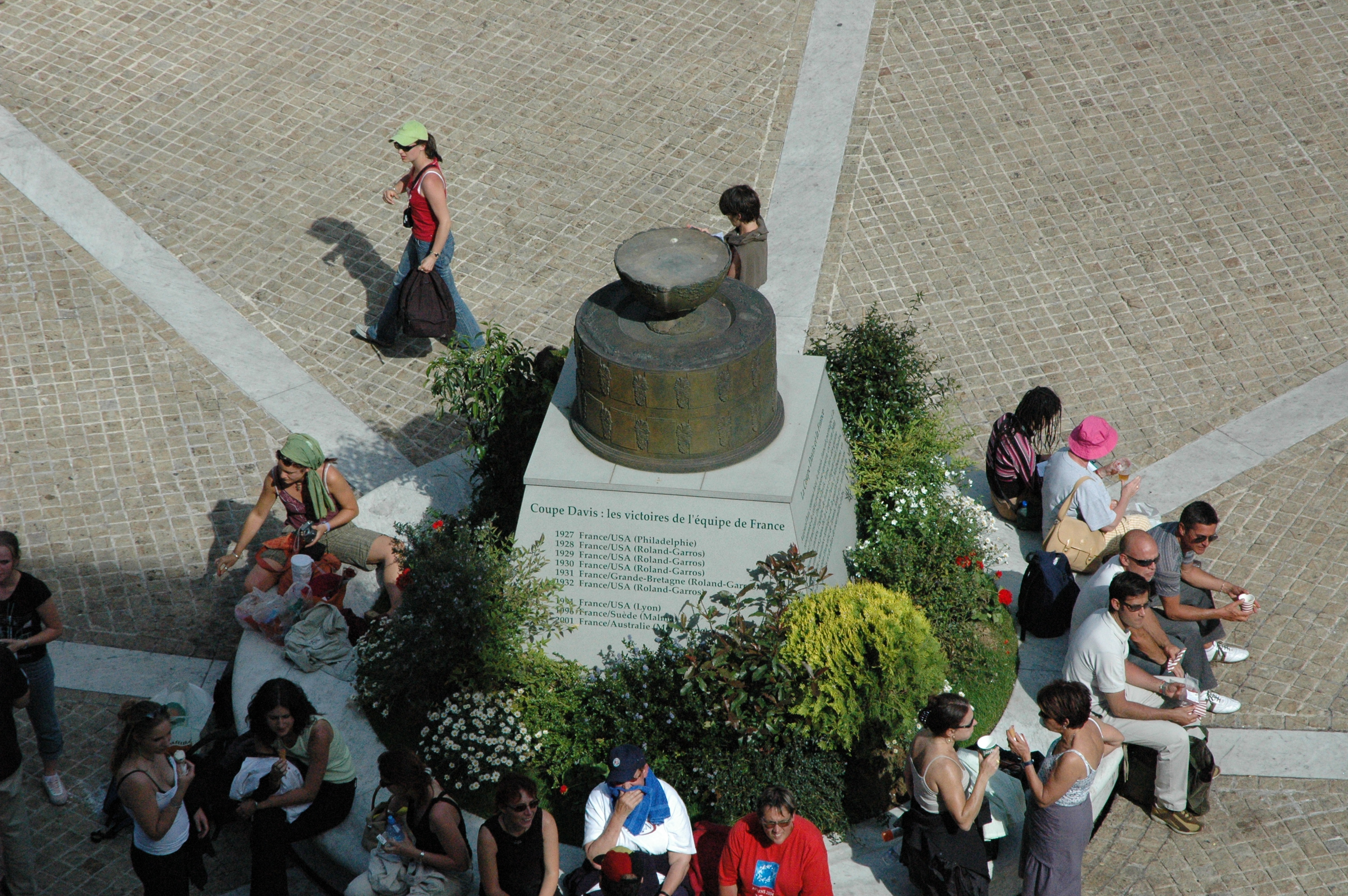
A monument to the Davis Cup at Stade Roland Garros in Paris, France

=== Competition ===
The 18 best national teams are assigned to the World Group and compete annually for the Davis Cup. Nations which are not in the World Group compete in one of three regional zones (Americas, Asia/Oceania, and Europe/Africa). The competition is spread over four weekends during the year. Each elimination round between competing nations is held in one of the countries, and is played as the best of five matches (4 singles, 1 doubles). World Tennis determines the host countries for all possible matchups before each year's tournament.

The World Group is the top group and includes the world's best 18 national teams. Teams in the World Group play a four-round elimination event. Teams are seeded based on a ranking system released by World Tennis, taking into account previous years' results. The defending champion and runner-up are always the top two seeds in the event. The losers of the first-round matches are sent to the World Group playoff round, where they play along with winners from Group I of the regional zones. The playoff round winners play in the World Group for the next year's competition, while the losers play in Group I of their respective regional zone.

Each of the three regional zones is divided into four groups. Groups I and II play elimination rounds, with the losing teams facing relegation to the next-lower group. The teams in Groups III and those in Group IV play a round-robin event with promotion and relegation.

=== 2019 modifications ===
For the 2019 edition, the format of the cup is changed. The main modification is the World Group taking place at one location and in one week, with eighteen teams divided in six round-robin groups of three teams each, with the winners of the groups and the two best second places advancing to quarterfinals. The series between the teams in this stage will feature two singles matches and one doubles match, instead of the best-of-5 series, with the matches changing from best of 5 sets to best of 3. As the World Group will now take place as one single competition, this event has been named as the Davis Cup Finals. The lower zone groups I and II will be composed of single ties deciding promotion or relegation.

=== Structure ===
Level	Group(s)			
1	World Group; 18 countries			
2	Group One Americas Zone; 6 countries	Group One Europe/Africa Zone; 11 countries		Group One Asia/Oceania Zone; 7 countries
3	Group Two Americas Zone; 8 countries	Group Two Europe/Africa Zone; 16 countries		Group Two Asia/Oceania Zone; 8 countries
4	Group Three Americas Zone; 9 countries	Group Three Europe Zone; 15 countries	Group Three Africa Zone; 10 countries	Group Three Asia/Oceania Zone; 9 countries
5				Group Four Asia/Oceania Zone; 11 countries

Note: The total number of nations in Group One is 24. However, the distribution among the three zones may vary each year, according to the number of nations promoted or relegated between Group One and the World Group. The number of nations in the World Group and Group One together is 22 from Euro/Africa Zone, 9 from Americas Zone and 9 from Asia/Oceania Zone.

=== Ties and rubbers ===
As in other cup competitions tie is used in the Davis Cup to mean an elimination round. In the Davis Cup, the word rubber means an individual match.

In the annual World Group competition, 16 nations compete in eight first-round ties; the eight winners compete in four quarterfinal ties; the four winners compete in two semifinal ties; and the two winners compete in the final tie.

Each tie consists of five rubbers, which are played in three days (usually on Friday, Saturday, and Sunday). The winner of the tie is the nation which wins three or more of the five rubbers in the tie. On the first day, the first two rubbers are singles, which are generally played by each nation's two best available singles players. On the second day, the doubles rubber is played. On the third day, the final two rubbers are typically reverse singles, in which the first-day contestants usually play again, but they swap opponents from the first day's singles rubbers. However, in certain circumstances, the team captain may replace one or two of the players who played the singles on Friday by other players who were nominated for the tie. For example, if the tie has already been decided in favour of one of the teams, it is common for younger or lower-ranked team members to play the remaining dead rubbers in order for them to gain Davis Cup experience.

Since 2011, if a nation has a winning 3–1 lead after the first reverse single match and that match has gone to four sets or more, then the remaining reverse single match which is a dead rubber is not played. All five rubbers are played if one nation has a winning 3–0 lead after the doubles match.

Ties are played at a venue chosen by one of the competing countries. The right of choice is given on an alternating basis. Therefore, countries play in the country where the last tie between the teams was not held. In case the two countries have not met since 1970, lots are drawn to determine the host country.

Venues in the World Group must comply with certain minimum standards, including a minimum seating capacity as follows:

- World Group play-offs: 4,000
- World Group first round: 4,000
- World Group quarterfinals: 6,000
- World Group semifinals: 8,000
- World Group final: 12,000

=== Captain ===
Prior to each tie, the captain (non-playing coach appointed by the national association) nominates a squad of four players and decides who will compete in the tie. On the day before play starts, the order of play for the first day is drawn at random. In the past, teams could substitute final day singles players only in case of injury or illness, verified by a doctor, but current rules permit the captain to designate any player to play the last two singles rubbers, provided that no first day matchup is repeated. There is no restriction on which of the playing team members may play the doubles rubber: the two singles players, two other players (usually doubles specialists) or a combination.

Each rubber is normally played as best of five sets. Since 2016, all sets use a tiebreak at 6–6 if necessary (formerly, the fifth set usually had no tiebreaker, so play continued until one side won by two games e.g. 10–8). However, if a team has clinched the tie before all five rubbers have been completed, the remaining rubbers may be shortened to best of three sets, with a tiebreak if necessary to decide all three sets.

In Group III and Group IV competitions, each tie consists only of three rubbers, which include two singles and one doubles rubber, which is played in a single day. The rubbers are in the best of three sets format, with a tie breaker if necessary to decide all three sets.

== Records and statistics ==
=== Performance by team ===
Country	Winners	Runners-up
United States	1900, 1902, 1913, 1920, 1921, 1922, 1923, 1924, 1925, 1926, 1937, 1938, 1946, 1947, 1948, 1949, 1954, 1958, 1963, 1968, 1969, 1970, 1971, 1972, 1978, 1979, 1981, 1982, 1990, 1992, 1995, 2007 (32)	1903, 1905, 1906, 1908, 1909, 1911, 1914, 1927, 1928, 1929, 1930, 1932, 1934, 1935, 1939, 1950, 1951, 1952, 1953, 1955, 1956, 1957, 1959, 1964, 1973, 1984, 1991, 1997, 2004 (29)
Australasia; Australia	1907, 1908, 1909, 1911, 1914, 1919, 1939, 1950, 1951, 1952, 1953, 1955, 1956, 1957, 1959, 1960, 1961, 1962, 1964, 1965, 1966, 1967, 1973, 1977, 1983, 1986, 1999, 2003 (28)	1912, 1920, 1922, 1923, 1924, 1936, 1938, 1946, 1947, 1948, 1949, 1954, 1958, 1963, 1968, 1990, 1993, 2000, 2001, 2022, 2023 (21)
France	1927, 1928, 1929, 1930, 1931, 1932, 1991, 1996, 2001, 2017 (10)	1925, 1926, 1933, 1982, 1999, 2002, 2010, 2014, 2018 (9)
British Isles; Great Britain	1903, 1904, 1905, 1906, 1912, 1933, 1934, 1935, 1936, 2015 (10)	1900, 1902, 1907, 1913, 1919, 1931, 1937, 1978 (8)
Sweden	1975, 1984, 1985, 1987, 1994, 1997, 1998 (7)	1983, 1986, 1988, 1989, 1996 (5)
Spain	2000, 2004, 2008, 2009, 2011, 2019 (6)	1965, 1967, 2003, 2012, 2025 (5)
Italy	1976, 2023, 2024, 2025 (4)	1960, 1961, 1977, 1979, 1980, 1998 (6)
Russia; RTF (Note: The team from Russia was not permitted to use the Russian name, flag, or anthem in 2021; it won the Finals as the team of the Russian Tennis Federation (RTF), and used the flag of the RTF.)	2002, 2006, 2021 (3)	1994, 1995, 2007 (3)
West Germany; Germany	1988, 1989, 1993 (3)	1970, 1985 (2)
Czechoslovakia; Czech Republic	1980, 2012, 2013 (3)	1975, 2009 (2)
Croatia	2005, 2018 (2)	2016, 2020–21 (2)
Argentina	2016 (1)	1981, 2006, 2008, 2011 (4)
Serbia	2010 (1)	2013 (1)
Switzerland	2014 (1)	1992 (1)
Canada	2022 (1)	2019 (1)
South Africa	1974 (1)	—
Romania	—	1969, 1971, 1972 (3)
India	—	1966, 1974, 1987 (3)
Belgium	—	1904, 2015, 2017 (3)
Japan	—	1921 (1)
Mexico	—	1962 (1)
Chile	—	1976 (1)
Slovakia	—	2005 (1)
Netherlands	—	2024 (1)

=== Titles by country ===
Country	Titles	First	Last
United States	32	1900	2007
Australasia; Australia	28	1907	2003
British Isles; Great Britain	10	1903	2015
France	10	1927	2017
Sweden	7	1975	1998
Spain	6	2000	2019
Italy	4	1976	2025
Czechoslovakia; Czech Republic	3	1980	2013
West Germany; Germany	3	1988	1993
Russia; RTF	3	2002	2021
Croatia	2	2005	2018
South Africa	1	1974	
Serbia	1	2010	
Switzerland	1	2014	
Argentina	1	2016	
Canada	1	2022	

- Consecutive titles
  - All-time: 7, United States, 1920–1926
  - Post-Challenge Round: 3, Italy, 2023–2025
- Consecutive finals appearances
  - All-time: 23, Australia, 1946–1968
  - Post-Challenge Round: 7, Sweden, 1983–1989
- Most games in a tie
  - All-time: 327, India 3–2 Australia, 1974 Eastern Zone final
  - World Group (before tiebreak): 281, Paraguay 3–2 France, 1985 first round
  - World Group (since tiebreak): 281, Romania 3–2 Ecuador, 2003 World Group play-offs

=== Years in World Group ===
- United States 37
- Czech Republic 36
- France 36
- Germany 35
- Spain 32
- Australia 31
- Sweden 31
- Italy 27
- Switzerland 27
- Russia 26
- Argentina 25
- Belgium 20
- Serbia (Note: until 2003 Yugoslavia, 2004–2006 Serbia and Montenegro) 20
- Netherlands 19
- Austria 17
- Great Britain 17
- Croatia 16
- Romania 14
- Brazil 13
- India 13
- Canada 10
- Israel 10
- Mexico 10
- Chile 9
- Denmark 9
- Japan 8
- New Zealand 8
- Kazakhstan 7
- Paraguay 7
- Slovakia 7
- South Korea 5
- Ecuador 5
- Belarus 4
- South Africa 4
- Hungary 3
- Morocco 3
- Zimbabwe 3
- Indonesia 2
- Cuba 1
- Ireland 1
- Peru 1
- Poland 1

=== Most wins in World Group ===
	Country	#
1.	United States	64
2.	France	58
3.	Sweden	56
4.	Australia	50
5.	Spain	40
6.	Argentina	39
7.	Czech Republic	37
8.	Germany	33
9.	Russia	28
10.	Italy	22

=== Results by nation ===
==== World Group ====
(1981–2018)

Nation	Yrs	Won	81	82	83	84	85	86	87	88	89	90	91	92	93	94	95	96	97	98	99	00	01	02	03	04	05	06	07	08	09	10	11	12	13	14	15	16	17	18	Nat.
Argentina	25	1	F	1R	SF	QF	1R	-	1R	-	-	SF	QF	1R	-	-	-	-	-	-	-	-	-	SF	SF	QF	SF	F	QF	F	QF	SF	F	SF	SF	1R	SF	W	1R	-	(Argentina)
Australia	31	4	SF	SF	W	SF	SF	W	SF	QF	1R	F	QF	QF	F	1R	1R	-	SF	1R	W	F	F	1R	W	1R	QF	SF	1R	-	-	-	-	-	-	1R	SF	1R	SF	1R	(Australia)
Austria	17	0	-	-	-	-	-	-	-	-	QF	SF	1R	-	1R	1R	QF	1R	-	-	-	1R	-	-	-	1R	1R	1R	1R	1R	1R	-	1R	QF	1R	-	-	-	-	-	(Austria)
Belarus	4	0	Part of Soviet Union / CIS													-	-	-	-	-	-	-	-	-	-	SF	1R	QF	1R	-	-	-	-	-	-	-	-	-	-	-	(Belarus)
Belgium	20	0	-	-	-	-	-	-	-	-	-	-	1R	1R	-	1R	1R	1R	-	QF	SF	1R	1R	-	1R	-	-	-	QF	1R	-	1R	1R	-	1R	1R	F	1R	F	QF	(Belgium)
Brazil	13	0	1R	-	-	-	-	-	-	1R	-	-	-	SF	1R	-	-	-	1R	1R	QF	SF	QF	1R	1R	-	-	-	-	-	-	-	-	-	1R	-	1R	-	-	-	(Brazil)
Canada	10	0	-	-	-	-	-	-	-	-	-	-	1R	1R	-	-	-	-	-	-	-	-	-	-	-	1R	-	-	-	-	-	-	-	1R	SF	1R	QF	1R	1R	1R	(Canada)
Chile	9	0	-	QF	1R	-	1R	-	-	-	-	-	-	-	-	-	-	-	-	-	-	-	-	-	-	-	1R	QF	1R	-	1R	QF	1R	-	-	-	-	-	-	-	(Chile)
Croatia	16	2	Part of Yugoslavia												-	-	1R	-	-	-	-	-	-	QF	QF	1R	W	QF	1R	-	SF	QF	1R	QF	1R	-	1R	F	1R	W	(Croatia)
Cuba	1	0	-	-	-	-	-	-	-	-	-	-	-	-	1R	-	-	-	-	-	-	-	-	-	-	-	-	-	-	-	-	-	-	-	-	-	-	-	-	-	(Cuba)
Czech Republic (Note: until 1992 Czechoslovakia)	36	2	QF	QF	1R	SF	SF	SF	1R	QF	QF	QF	QF	QF	QF	QF	1R	SF	QF	1R	1R	QF	1R	QF	1R	1R	1R	-	1R	QF	F	SF	1R	W	W	SF	1R	QF	1R	-	(Czech Republic)
Denmark	9	0	-	-	1R	1R	-	1R	-	QF	1R	-	-	-	1R	1R	1R	1R	-	-	-	-	-	-	-	-	-	-	-	-	-	-	-	-	-	-	-	-	-	-	(Denmark)
Ecuador	5	0	-	-	-	1R	QF	1R	-	-	-	-	-	-	-	-	-	-	-	-	-	-	1R	-	-	-	-	-	-	-	-	1R	-	-	-	-	-	-	-	-	(Ecuador)
France	36	4	1R	F	SF	QF	1R	-	QF	SF	QF	1R	W	QF	QF	QF	1R	W	1R	-	F	1R	W	F	QF	SF	QF	QF	QF	QF	1R	F	SF	QF	QF	F	QF	SF	W	F	(France)
Germany (Note: until 1989 West Germany)	35	3	1R	1R	-	1R	F	1R	1R	W	W	QF	SF	1R	W	SF	SF	QF	1R	QF	1R	QF	QF	1R	1R	-	-	1R	SF	QF	QF	1R	QF	1R	1R	QF	1R	1R	1R	QF	(Germany)
Great Britain	17	1	SF	1R	1R	1R	-	QF	1R	-	-	-	-	1R	-	-	-	-	-	-	1R	1R	-	1R	1R	-	-	-	-	1R	-	-	-	-	-	QF	W	SF	QF	1R	(United Kingdom)
Hungary	3	0	-	-	-	-	-	-	-	-	-	-	-	-	-	1R	-	1R	-	-	-	-	-	-	-	-	-	-	-	-	-	-	-	-	-	-	-	-	-	1R	(Hungary)
India	13	0	-	1R	-	1R	QF	1R	F	1R	-	-	-	-	SF	1R	-	QF	1R	1R	-	-	-	-	-	-	-	-	-	-	-	1R	1R	-	-	-	-	-	-	-	(India)
Indonesia	2	0	-	-	1R	-	-	-	-	-	1R	-	-	-	-	-	-	-	-	-	-	-	-	-	-	-	-	-	-	-	-	-	-	-	-	-	-	-	-	-	(Indonesia)
Ireland	1	0	-	-	1R	-	-	-	-	-	-	-	-	-	-	-	-	-	-	-	-	-	-	-	-	-	-	-	-	-	-	-	-	-	-	-	-	-	-	-	(Republic of Ireland)
Israel	10	0	-	-	-	-	-	-	QF	1R	1R	1R	1R	-	-	1R	-	-	-	-	-	-	-	-	-	-	-	-	-	1R	SF	1R	-	-	1R	-	-	-	-	-	(Israel)
Italy	27	0	1R	QF	QF	QF	1R	QF	1R	QF	1R	QF	1R	QF	QF	1R	QF	SF	SF	F	1R	1R	-	-	-	-	-	-	-	-	-	-	-	1R	QF	SF	1R	QF	QF	QF	(Italy)
Japan	8	0	1R	-	-	-	1R	-	-	-	-	-	-	-	-	-	-	-	-	-	-	-	-	-	-	-	-	-	-	-	-	-	-	1R	-	QF	1R	1R	1R	1R	(Japan)
Kazakhstan	7	0	Part of Soviet Union / CIS														-	-	-	-	-	-	-	-	-	-	-	-	-	-	-	-	QF	1R	QF	QF	QF	1R	-	QF	(Kazakhstan)
Mexico	10	0	1R	1R	-	-	-	QF	QF	1R	1R	1R	1R	-	-	-	-	1R	1R	-	-	-	-	-	-	-	-	-	-	-	-	-	-	-	-	-	-	-	-	-	(Mexico)
Morocco	3	0	-	-	-	-	-	-	-	-	-	-	-	-	-	-	-	-	-	-	-	-	1R	1R	-	1R	-	-	-	-	-	-	-	-	-	-	-	-	-	-	(Morocco)
Netherlands	19	0	-	-	-	-	-	-	-	-	-	1R	-	1R	QF	QF	QF	1R	QF	1R	1R	1R	SF	1R	1R	QF	QF	1R	-	-	1R	-	-	-	-	1R	-	-	-	1R	(Netherlands)
New Zealand	8	0	QF	SF	QF	1R	-	1R	-	1R	-	QF	1R	-	-	-	-	-	-	-	-	-	-	-	-	-	-	-	-	-	-	-	-	-	-	-	-	-	-	-	(New Zealand)
Paraguay	7	0	-	-	QF	QF	QF	1R	QF	1R	1R	-	-	-	-	-	-	-	-	-	-	-	-	-	-	-	-	-	-	-	-	-	-	-	-	-	-	-	-	-	(Paraguay)
Peru	1	0	-	-	-	-	-	-	-	-	-	-	-	-	-	-	-	-	-	-	-	-	-	-	-	-	-	-	-	1R	-	-	-	-	-	-	-	-	-	-	(Peru)
Poland	1	0	-	-	-	-	-	-	-	-	-	-	-	-	-	-	-	-	-	-	-	-	-	-	-	-	-	-	-	-	-	-	-	-	-	-	-	1R	-	-	(Poland)
Romania	14	0	QF	1R	QF	1R	-	-	-	-	-	-	-	-	-	-	-	-	1R	-	-	-	1R	-	1R	1R	QF	1R	1R	1R	1R	-	1R	-	-	-	-	-	-	-	(Romania)
Russia (Note: until 1992 Soviet Union, 1993 CIS)	26	2	-	1R	1R	-	1R	1R	-	-	1R	-	-	-	1R	F	F	1R	1R	1R	SF	QF	QF	W	QF	1R	SF	W	F	SF	QF	QF	1R	1R	-	-	-	-	1R	-	(Russia)
Serbia (Note: until 2003 Yugoslavia, 2004–2006 Serbia and Montenegro)	20	1	-	-	-	1R	1R	QF	1R	SF	SF	1R	SF	1R	-	-	-	-	-	-	-	-	-	-	-	-	-	-	-	1R	1R	W	SF	QF	F	1R	QF	QF	SF	1R	(Serbia)
Slovakia	7	0	Part of Czechoslovakia													-	-	-	-	1R	QF	QF	1R	1R	-	-	F	1R	-	-	-	-	-	-	-	-	-	-	-	-	(Slovakia)
South Africa	4	0	-	-	-	-	-	-	-	-	-	-	-	-	-	-	QF	QF	QF	1R	-	-	-	-	-	-	-	-	-	-	-	-	-	-	-	-	-	-	-	-	(South Africa)
South Korea	3	0	1R	-	-	-	-	-	1R	-	-	-	-	-	-	-	-	-	-	-	-	-	-	-	-	-	-	-	-	1R	-	-	-	-	-	-	-	-	-	-	(South Korea)
Spain	32	5	-	1R	-	-	1R	1R	SF	1R	QF	1R	QF	1R	1R	QF	1R	-	QF	SF	1R	W	1R	QF	F	W	1R	1R	QF	W	W	QF	W	F	1R	1R	-	-	QF	SF	(Spain)
Sweden	31	6	QF	QF	F	W	W	F	W	F	F	1R	1R	SF	SF	W	SF	F	W	W	1R	-	SF	QF	QF	QF	1R	1R	SF	QF	1R	1R	QF	1R	-	-	-	-	-	-	(Sweden)
Switzerland	27	1	1R	-	-	-	-	-	-	1R	-	1R	-	F	1R	-	1R	1R	1R	QF	QF	1R	QF	1R	SF	QF	1R	1R	1R	-	1R	1R	-	1R	1R	W	1R	1R	1R	1R	(Switzerland)
United States	37	6	W	W	1R	F	QF	SF	1R	-	SF	W	F	W	1R	SF	W	QF	F	SF	QF	SF	1R	SF	1R	F	1R	SF	W	SF	QF	1R	QF	SF	QF	1R	1R	QF	QF	SF	(United States)
Zimbabwe	3	0	-	-	-	-	-	-	-	-	-	-	-	-	-	-	-	-	-	QF	1R	1R	-	-	-	-	-	-	-	-	-	-	-	-	-	-	-	-	-	-	(Zimbabwe)
Nation	Yrs	Won	81	82	83	84	85	86	87	88	89	90	91	92	93	94	95	96	97	98	99	00	01	02	03	04	05	06	07	08	09	10	11	12	13	14	15	16	17	18	Nat.

==== Finals ====
(2019–present)

Country	App	Won	2019	2021	2022	2023	2024	2025	2026
Argentina	4	0	QF	–	RR	–	QF	QF	–
Australia	5	0	QF	RR	F	F	SF	–	–
Austria	3	0	–	RR	–	–	–	QF	QF
Belgium	4	0	RR	–	RR	–	RR	SF	–
Brazil	1	0	–	–	–	–	RR	–	–
Canada	6	1	F	RR	W	QF	QF	–	QF
Chile	3	0	RR	–	–	RR	RR	–	–
Colombia	2	0	RR	RR	–	–	–	–	–
Croatia	4	0	RR	F	SF	RR	–	–	–
Czech Republic	5	0	–	RR	–	QF	RR	QF	QF
Ecuador	1	0	–	RR	–	–	–	–	–
Finland	2	0	–	–	–	SF	RR	–	–
France	6	0	RR	RR	RR	RR	RR	QF	–
Germany	6	0	QF	SF	QF	–	SF	SF	QF
Great Britain	6	0	SF	QF	RR	QF	RR	–	QF
Hungary	1	0	–	RR	–	–	–	–	–
Italy	7	3	RR	QF	SF	W	W	W	QF
Japan	1	0	RR	–	–	–	–	–	–
Kazakhstan	3	0	RR	QF	RR	–	–	–	–
Netherlands	4	0	RR	–	QF	QF	F	–	–
Russia/ RTF	2	1	SF	W	–	–	–	–	–
Serbia	4	0	QF	SF	RR	SF	–	–	–
Slovakia	1	0	–	–	–	–	RR	–	–
South Korea	3	0	–	–	RR	RR	–	–	QF
Spain	7	1	W	RR	QF	RR	QF	F	QF
Sweden	3	0	–	QF	RR	RR	–	–	–
Switzerland	1	0	–	–	–	RR	–	–	–
United States	5	0	RR	RR	QF	RR	QF	–	–
Number of teams			18	18	16	16	16	8	8

=== Individual ===
- Most titles as a player;
  - Roy Emerson; Australia; 8 titles (1959, 1960, 1961, 1962, 1964, 1965, 1966, 1967)
- Most titles as captain;
  - Harry Hopman; Australia; 16 titles (1939, 1950, 1951, 1952, 1953, 1955, 1956, 1957, 1959, 1960, 1961, 1962, 1964, 1965, 1966, 1967)
- Youngest player
  - Marco De Rossi; San Marino; 13 years, 319 days (12 May 2011) (Note: Players must now be aged 14 and over.)
- Oldest player
  - Vittorio Pellandra; San Marino; 66 years, 104 days (11 May 2007)
- Most years played
  - 30, Leander Paes, India (1990–2010, 2012–2020)
- Most ties played
  - 102, Omar Al-Awadhi, United Arab Emirates (1996–2024)
- Most rubbers played
  - 164, Nicola Pietrangeli, Italy (1954–1972)
- Most rubbers won
  - Total: 120, Nicola Pietrangeli, Italy
  - Singles: 78, Nicola Pietrangeli, Italy
  - Doubles: 45, Leander Paes, India

== Current Davis Cup Nations Ranking ==
For more information, see ITF rankings

Davis Cup Nations Ranking, as of 21 September 2026
Rank	Nation	Points	Move^{†}
1	Italy	584.50	Steady
2	Spain	476.00	Steady
3	Germany	459.25	Steady
4	Belgium	422.25	Steady
5	Czech Republic	418.75	▲2
6	Austria	409.50	▲3
7	United States	404.75	▼2
8	Canada	397.25	▲4
9	Australia	396.00	▼1
10	France	395.25	▼4
11	Great Britain	390.00	▲2
12	Argentina	382.25	▼2
13	Netherlands	380.00	▼2
14	South Korea	363.50	▲2
15	Hungary	352.25	▲2
16	Chile	350.50	▼2
17	Croatia	348.75	▼2
18	Brazil	342.25	Steady
19	Japan	337.75	▲6
20	Denmark	336.75	▲1

^{†}Change since previous ranking update

== See also ==
- Junior Davis Cup and Junior Billie Jean King Cup
- List of Davis Cup champions
- Billie Jean King Cup
- ATP Cup
- Hopman Cup
- Davis Cup Tennis, a video game based on the event
- History of tennis
