= 1972 Davis Cup =

1972 edition of the Davis Cup

Details
- Duration: 20 March – 15 October 1972
- Edition: 61st
- Teams: 52

Champion
- Winning nation: United States

The 1972 Davis Cup was the 61st edition of the Davis Cup, the most important tournament between national teams in men's tennis. 55 teams would enter the competition, 33 in the Europe Zone, 11 in the Americas Zone, and 11 in the Eastern Zone.

From this year's tournament onward, the Challenge Round was abolished, meaning the defending champion would now play in all matches rather than receiving a bye to the final, and the winner of the Inter-Zonal Zone would win the Davis Cup.

The United States defeated Chile in the Americas Inter-Zonal final, Australia defeated India in the Eastern Inter-Zonal final, and Romania and Spain were the winners of the two Europe Zones, defeating the Soviet Union and Czechoslovakia respectively.

In the Inter-Zonal Zone, the United States defeated Spain and Romania defeated Australia in the semifinals. The United States then defeated Romania in the final, giving the United States their fifth straight title. The final was played at the Club Sportiv Progresul in Bucharest, Romania on 13–15 October.

== Americas Zone ==
=== North & Central America Zone ===
Semifinals; 20–22 March; 12–14 May
Kingston, Jamaica (indoor carpet)
United States	4
Caribbean/West Indies	1
Vancouver, Canada (clay)
Canada	2
Mexico	3

Final; 16–18 June
Mexico City, Mexico (clay)
United States	5
Mexico	0

=== South America Zone ===
Quarterfinals; 20–26 March
Argentina
bye
Rio de Janeiro, Brazil
Brazil	4
Venezuela	0
Santiago, Chile
Chile	4
Peru	1
Guayaquil, Ecuador (clay)
Ecuador	1
Colombia	4

Semifinals; 8–10 April
Rio de Janeiro, Brazil (clay)
Argentina	2
Brazil	3
Santiago, Chile
Chile	4
Colombia	1

Final; 21–23 April
Rio de Janeiro, Brazil
Brazil	2
Chile	3

=== Americas Inter-Zonal Final ===
Chile vs. United States

Chile
0
Stade Français, Santiago, Chile
21–24 July 1972

United States
5

			1	2	3	4	5
1	(Chile) (United States)	Jaime Pinto Bravo; Stan Smith	1; 6	5; 7	2; 6
2	(Chile) (United States)	Patricio Cornejo; Harold Solomon	7; 9	6; 4	1; 6	6; 3	2; 6
3	(Chile) (United States)	Patricio Cornejo / Jaime Fillol; Stan Smith / Erik van Dillen	2; 6	4; 6	6; 4	6; 3	3; 6
4	(Chile) (United States)	Jaime Pinto Bravo; Harold Solomon	1; 6	1; 6	2; 6
5	(Chile) (United States)	Patricio Cornejo; Stan Smith	4; 6	6; 1	7; 9	1; 6

== Eastern Zone ==
=== Zone A ===
Quarterfinals; 24–26 March
Australia
bye
South Korea	w/o
Philippines
Saigon, South Vietnam
South Vietnam	5
Chinese Taipei	0
Hong Kong
Hong Kong	0
Japan	5

Semifinals; 8–16 April
Seoul, South Korea
Australia	5
South Korea	0
Saigon, South Vietnam
South Vietnam	2
Japan	3

Final; 28–30 April
Tokyo, Japan
Australia	4
Japan	1

=== Zone B ===
Semifinals; 1–3 April
Lucknow, India
India	5
Ceylon	0
Malaysia	w/o
Pakistan

Final; 28–30 April
Kuala Lumpur, Malaysia
India	5
Malaysia	0

=== Eastern Inter-Zonal Final ===
India vs. Australia

India
0
Bangalore, India
16–18 May 1972

Australia
5

			1	2	3	4	5
1	(India) (Australia)	Vijay Amritraj; Mal Anderson	4; 6	4; 6	2; 6
2	(India) (Australia)	Jaidip Mukerjea; Geoff Masters	3; 6	3; 6	6; 3	6; 1	3; 6
3	(India) (Australia)	Premjit Lall / Jaidip Mukerjea; Colin Dibley / Geoff Masters	2; 6	4; 6	6; 3	3; 6
4	(India) (Australia)	Anand Amritraj; Ross Case	1; 6	6; 8	5; 7
5	(India) (Australia)	Vijay Amritraj; Colin Dibley	5; 7	6; 4	3; 6	2; 6

== Europe Zone ==
=== Zone A ===
Preliminary Round; 21–23 April
Tel Aviv, Israel (hard)
Israel	1
Iran	4

First Round; 1–13 May
Bucharest, Romania (clay)
Romania	5
Switzerland	0
Tehran, Iran
Iran	4
Egypt	1
Reggio Calabria, Italy (clay)
Italy	5
Austria	0
Scheveningen, Netherlands (clay)
Netherlands	5
Norway	0
Helsinki, Finland (clay)
Finland	2
Denmark	3
Warsaw, Poland
Poland	3
Yugoslavia	1
Beirut, Lebanon (clay)
Lebanon	0
Morocco	5
Tbilisi, Soviet Union
Soviet Union	3
Hungary	2

Quarterfinals; 18–22 May
Bucharest, Romania (clay)
Romania	5
Iran	0
San Benedetto del Tronto, Italy (clay)
Italy	4
Netherlands	1
Copenhagen, Denmark (clay)
Denmark	0
Poland	5
Casablanca, Morocco
Morocco	0
Soviet Union	5

Semifinals; 9–18 June
Bucharest, Romania (clay)
Romania	4
Italy	1
Warsaw, Poland
Poland	0
Soviet Union	4

Final; 21–23 July
Tbilisi, Soviet Union
Romania	3
Soviet Union	2

=== Zone A Final ===
Soviet Union vs. Romania

Soviet Union
2
Tbilisi, Soviet Union
21–23 July 1972

Romania
3

			1	2	3	4	5
1	(Soviet Union) (Romania)	Alex Metreveli; Ilie Năstase	4; 6	0; 6	4; 6
2	(Soviet Union) (Romania)	Teimuraz Kakulia; Ion Țiriac	6; 4	7; 5	6; 1
3	(Soviet Union) (Romania)	Sergei Likhachev / Alex Metreveli; Ilie Năstase / Ion Țiriac	2; 6	4; 6	3; 6
4	(Soviet Union) (Romania)	Alex Metreveli; Ion Țiriac	2; 6	6; 4	1; 6	6; 4	6; 3
5	(Soviet Union) (Romania)	Teimuraz Kakulia; Ilie Năstase	2; 6	2; 6	3; 6

=== Zone B ===
First Round; 28 April–7 May
Brussels, Belgium (clay)
Czechoslovakia	3
Belgium	2
Båstad, Sweden (clay)
Sweden	4
New Zealand	1
Athens, Greece
Greece	0
West Germany	5
Cork, Ireland
Ireland	5
Turkey	0
Paris, France (clay)
France	4
Great Britain	1
Sofia, Bulgaria
Bulgaria	0
Spain	5
Monte Carlo, Monaco
Monaco	3
Luxembourg	2
Portugal	w/o
South Africa

Quarterfinals; 19–22 May
Prague, Czechoslovakia (clay)
Czechoslovakia	3
Sweden	1
West Berlin
West Germany	5
Ireland	0
Paris, France (clay)
France	2
Spain	3
Monte Carlo, Monaco (clay)
Monaco	3
Portugal	2

Semifinals; 14–18 June
Düsseldorf, West Germany (clay)
Czechoslovakia	3
West Germany	2
Avilés, Spain
Spain	5
Monaco	0

Final; 21–24 July
Barcelona, Spain (clay)
Czechoslovakia	2
Spain	3

=== Zone B Final ===
Spain vs. Czechoslovakia

Spain
3
Barcelona, Spain
21–24 July 1972
Clay

Czechoslovakia
2

			1	2	3	4	5
1	(Spain) (Czechoslovakia)	Juan Gisbert; Jan Kodeš	8; 6	6; 4	5; 7	0; 6	6; 4
2	(Spain) (Czechoslovakia)	Manuel Orantes; František Pála	5; 7	4; 6	6; 0	7; 5	4; 6
3	(Spain) (Czechoslovakia)	Juan Gisbert / Manuel Orantes; Jan Kodeš / Jan Kukal	10; 12	6; 2	7; 5	6; 4
4	(Spain) (Czechoslovakia)	Juan Gisbert; František Pála	6; 3	6; 3	4; 6	6; 0
5	(Spain) (Czechoslovakia)	Antonio Muñoz; Jiří Hřebec	4; 6	0; 6	3; 6

== Inter-Zonal Zone ==
=== Draw ===
Semifinals; 4–7 August
Barcelona, Spain (clay)
EUR-B	Spain	2
AME	United States	3
Bucharest, Romania (clay)
EAS	Australia	1
EUR-A	Romania	4

Final; 13–15 October
Bucharest, Romania (clay)
AME	United States	3
EUR-A	Romania	2

=== Semifinals ===
Spain vs. United States

Spain
2
Real Club de Tenis, Barcelona, Spain
4–7 August 1972
Clay

United States
3

			1	2	3	4	5
1	(Spain) (United States)	Andrés Gimeno; Stan Smith	6; 8	7; 5	6; 3	6; 4
2	(Spain) (United States)	Juan Gisbert; Harold Solomon	7; 9	5; 7	6; 0	6; 1	4; 6
3	(Spain) (United States)	Andrés Gimeno / Juan Gisbert; Stan Smith / Erik van Dillen	3; 6	6; 0	2; 6	3; 6
4	(Spain) (United States)	Andrés Gimeno; Harold Solomon	6; 3	6; 1	2; 6	6; 2
5	(Spain) (United States)	Juan Gisbert; Stan Smith	9; 11	8; 10	4; 6

Romania vs. Australia

Romania
4
Bucharest, Romania
4–7 August 1972
Clay

Australia
1

			1	2	3	4	5
1	(Romania) (Australia)	Ion Țiriac; Mal Anderson	6; 2	6; 2	6; 8	4; 6	4; 6
2	(Romania) (Australia)	Ilie Năstase; Colin Dibley	6; 3	6; 0	6; 2
3	(Romania) (Australia)	Ilie Năstase / Ion Țiriac; Mal Anderson / Colin Dibley	6; 2	6; 2	6; 2
4	(Romania) (Australia)	Ion Țiriac; Colin Dibley	6; 3	3; 6	11; 13	6; 3	6; 0
5	(Romania) (Australia)	Ilie Năstase; Mal Anderson	6; 2	6; 2	4; 6	6; 3

=== Final ===
Romania vs. United States

Romania
2
Club Sportiv Progresul, Bucharest, Romania
13–15 October 1972
Clay

United States
3

			1	2	3	4	5
1	(Romania) (United States)	Ilie Năstase; Stan Smith	9; 11	2; 6	3; 6
2	(Romania) (United States)	Ion Țiriac; Tom Gorman	4; 6	2; 6	6; 4	6; 3	6; 2
3	(Romania) (United States)	Ilie Năstase / Ion Țiriac; Stan Smith / Erik van Dillen	2; 6	0; 6	3; 6
4	(Romania) (United States)	Ion Țiriac; Stan Smith	6; 4	2; 6	4; 6	6; 2	0; 6
5	(Romania) (United States)	Ilie Năstase; Tom Gorman	6; 1	6; 2	5; 7	10; 8
