= 1971 Davis Cup =

1971 edition of the Davis Cup

Details
- Duration: 19 March – 11 October 1971
- Edition: 60th
- Teams: 51

Champion
- Winning nation: United States

The 1971 Davis Cup was the 60th edition of the Davis Cup, the most important tournament between national teams in men's tennis. 28 teams entered the Europe Zone, 13 teams entered the Americas Zone, and 9 teams entered the Eastern Zone. Bolivia made its first appearance in the tournament.

Brazil defeated Mexico in the Americas Inter-Zonal final, India defeated Japan in the Eastern Inter-Zonal final, and Czechoslovakia and Romania were the winners of the two Europe Zones, defeating Spain and West Germany respectively.

In the Inter-Zonal Zone, Brazil defeated Czechoslovakia and Romania defeated India in the semifinals, and then Romania defeated Brazil in the final. Romania were then defeated by the defending champions the United States in the Challenge Round. The final was played at the Olde Providence Racquet Club in Charlotte, North Carolina, United States on 8–11 October.

1971 was the last year the Davis Cup was played under the Challenge Round format.

South Africa was excluded from the tournament as part of the growing international opposition to its apartheid policies.

== Americas Zone ==
=== North & Central America Zone ===
Quarterfinals; 8–10 May
Mexico City, Mexico (clay)
Mexico	5
South Korea	0
Canada
bye
bye
Caribbean/West Indies
bye
New Zealand

Semifinals; 7–30 May
Mexico City, Mexico (clay)
Mexico	3
Canada	2
Kingston, Jamaica
Caribbean/West Indies	1
New Zealand	4

Final; 4–6 June
Mexico City, Mexico (clay)
Mexico	3
New Zealand	2

=== South America Zone ===
Quarterfinals; 19 March–6 April
Porto Alegre, Brazil
Brazil	5
Bolivia	0
Guayaquil, Ecuador (hard)
Ecuador	4
Venezuela	1
Montevideo, Uruguay (clay)
Uruguay	0
Argentina	5
Bogotá, Colombia
Colombia	2
Chile	3

Semifinals; 9–18 April
Porto Alegre, Brazil (clay)
Brazil	4
Ecuador	1
Santiago, Chile
Argentina	1
Chile	4

Final; 22–24 April
Santiago, Chile
Brazil	3
Chile	2

=== Americas Inter-Zonal Final ===
Mexico vs. Brazil

Mexico
2
Estadio Rafael Osuna, Mexico City, Mexico
17–19 July 1971
Clay

Brazil
3

			1	2	3	4	5
1	(Mexico) (Brazil)	Marcelo Lara; Thomaz Koch	4; 6	2; 6	1; 6
2	(Mexico) (Brazil)	Joaquín Loyo Mayo; José Edison Mandarino	6; 4	3; 6	4; 6	7; 5	6; 1
3	(Mexico) (Brazil)	Joaquín Loyo Mayo / Vicente Zarazúa; Thomaz Koch / José Edison Mandarino	8; 6	7; 5	6; 2
4	(Mexico) (Brazil)	Marcelo Lara; José Edison Mandarino	4; 6	3; 6	7; 9
5	(Mexico) (Brazil)	Joaquín Loyo Mayo; Thomaz Koch	5; 7	6; 4	9; 7	4; 6	7; 9

== Eastern Zone ==
=== Zone A ===
Quarterfinals; 27–29 March
Hong Kong
Australia	5
Hong Kong	0
Indonesia
bye
bye
Philippines
bye
Japan

Semifinals; 2–5 April
Jakarta, Indonesia
Australia	3
Indonesia	2
Manila, Philippines
Philippines	1
Japan	4

Final; 23–25 April
Tokyo, Japan
Australia	2
Japan	3

=== Zone B ===
Semifinals; 30 March–4 April
Colombo, Ceylon (clay)
India	4
Ceylon	0
Lahore, Pakistan
Malaysia	0
Pakistan	5

Final
India	w/o
Pakistan

=== Eastern Inter-Zonal Final ===
Japan vs. India

Japan
2
Denen Coliseum, Tokyo, Japan
15–17 May 1971
Clay

India
3

			1	2	3	4	5
1	(Japan) (India)	Toshiro Sakai; Jaidip Mukerjea	0; 6	0; 6	4; 6
2	(Japan) (India)	Keishiro Yanagi; Premjit Lall	3; 6	6; 3	6; 1	6; 2
3	(Japan) (India)	Jun Kamiwazumi / Toshiro Sakai; Premjit Lall / Jaidip Mukerjea	9; 7	1; 6	6; 3	1; 6	6; 8
4	(Japan) (India)	Toshiro Sakai; Premjit Lall	2; 6	2; 6	4; 6
5	(Japan) (India)	Keishiro Yanagi; Jaidip Mukerjea	6; 4	6; 3	6; 0

== Europe Zone ==
=== Zone A ===
First Round; 30 April–9 May
Spain
bye
Switzerland
bye
Båstad, Sweden (clay)
Sweden	0
France	5
Helsinki, Finland
Finland	5
Ireland	0
Cairo, Egypt (clay)
Egypt	1
Czechoslovakia	4
Lisbon, Portugal (clay)
Portugal	4
Turkey	1
Athens, Greece
Greece	1
Belgium	3
Copenhagen, Denmark (clay)
Denmark	0
Soviet Union	5

Quarterfinals; 13–16 May
Basel, Switzerland
Spain	4
Switzerland	0
Paris, France (clay)
France	3
Finland	0
Prague, Czechoslovakia (clay)
Czechoslovakia	5
Portugal	0
Brussels, Belgium
Belgium	1
Soviet Union	4

Semifinals; 11–13 June
Barcelona, Spain
Spain	4
France	1
Prague, Czechoslovakia (clay)
Czechoslovakia	4
Soviet Union	1

Final; 16–18 July
Prague, Czechoslovakia (clay)
Spain	2
Czechoslovakia	3

=== Zone A Final ===
Czechoslovakia vs. Spain

Czechoslovakia
3
Prague, Czechoslovakia
16–18 July 1971
Clay

Spain
2

			1	2	3	4	5
1	(Czechoslovakia) (Spain)	František Pála; Manuel Orantes	6; 2	4; 6	2; 6	5; 7
2	(Czechoslovakia) (Spain)	Jan Kodeš; Juan Gisbert	6; 3	4; 6	9; 7	7; 5
3	(Czechoslovakia) (Spain)	Jan Kodeš / Jan Kukal; Juan Gisbert / Manuel Orantes	4; 6	9; 11	4; 6
4	(Czechoslovakia) (Spain)	František Pála; Juan Gisbert	6; 0	6; 1	6; 1
5	(Czechoslovakia) (Spain)	Jan Kodeš; Manuel Orantes	7; 5	4; 6	7; 5	6; 4

=== Zone B ===
First Round; 28 April–8 May
West Germany
bye
Austria
bye
Budapest, Hungary
Hungary	5
Poland	0
Mondorf-les-Bains, Luxembourg
Luxembourg	5
Monaco	0
Tel Aviv, Israel (hard)
Israel	4
Norway	1
Bucharest, Romania (clay)
Romania	5
Netherlands	0
Perugia, Italy (clay)
Italy	5
Bulgaria	0
Zagreb, Yugoslavia (clay)
Great Britain	0
Yugoslavia	3

Quarterfinals; 14–16 May
Augsburg, West Germany
West Germany	4
Austria	1
Budapest, Hungary
Hungary	5
Luxembourg	0
Tel Aviv, Israel (hard)
Israel	0
Romania	5
Zagreb, Yugoslavia
Italy	2
Yugoslavia	3

Semifinals; 10–14 June
Munich, West Germany
West Germany	4
Hungary	1
Bucharest, Romania (clay)
Romania	4
Yugoslavia	1

Final; 16–18 July
Bucharest, Romania (clay)
West Germany	0
Romania	5

=== Zone B Final ===
Romania vs. West Germany

Romania
5
Bucharest, Romania
16–18 July 1971
Clay

West Germany
0

			1	2	3	4	5
1	(Romania) (West Germany)	Ion Țiriac; Christian Kuhnke	6; 2	3; 6	6; 2	7; 5
2	(Romania) (West Germany)	Ilie Năstase; Wilhelm Bungert	6; 2	6; 3	6; 2
3	(Romania) (West Germany)	Ilie Năstase / Ion Țiriac; Jürgen Fassbender / Hans-Jürgen Pohmann	8; 6	6; 4	6; 4
4	(Romania) (West Germany)	Ilie Năstase; Christian Kuhnke	6; 0	6; 4	6; 4
5	(Romania) (West Germany)	Petre Mărmureanu; Wilhelm Bungert	6; 1	7; 5	6; 1

== Inter-Zonal Zone ==
=== Draw ===
Semifinals; 1–3 August
New Delhi, India
EUR-B	Romania	4
EAS	India	1
Porto Alegre, Brazil (clay)
AME	Brazil	4
EUR-A	Czechoslovakia	1

Final; 21–23 August
São Paulo, Brazil
EUR-B	Romania	3
AME	Brazil	2

=== Semifinals ===
India vs. Romania

India
1
New Delhi, India
1–3 August 1971

Romania
4

			1	2	3	4	5
1	(India) (Romania)	Jaidip Mukerjea; Ilie Năstase	3; 6	3; 6	4; 6
2	(India) (Romania)	Premjit Lall; Ion Țiriac	14; 12	6; 3	9; 7
3	(India) (Romania)	Premjit Lall / Jaidip Mukerjea; Ilie Năstase / Ion Țiriac	3; 6	8; 6	6; 8	1; 6
4	(India) (Romania)	Jaidip Mukerjea; Ion Țiriac	6; 3	5; 7	3; 6			retired
5	(India) (Romania)	Premjit Lall; Ilie Năstase	3; 6	10; 8	1; 6	1; 6

Brazil vs. Czechoslovakia

Brazil
4
Porto Alegre, Brazil
1–3 August 1971
Clay

Czechoslovakia
1

			1	2	3	4	5
1	(Brazil) (Czechoslovakia)	José Edison Mandarino; Jan Kodeš	8; 6	6; 4	4; 6	6; 4
2	(Brazil) (Czechoslovakia)	Thomaz Koch; František Pála	6; 4	6; 4	6; 2
3	(Brazil) (Czechoslovakia)	Thomaz Koch / José Edison Mandarino; Jan Kodeš / Jan Kukal	8; 6	6; 2	6; 4
4	(Brazil) (Czechoslovakia)	Carlos Kirmayr; František Pála	1; 6	6; 2	6; 4	2; 6	4; 6
5	(Brazil) (Czechoslovakia)	Luis Felipe Tavares; Vladimír Zedník	7; 9	7; 5	6; 4	4; 5		retired

=== Final ===
Brazil vs. Romania

Brazil
2
São Paulo, Brazil
21–23 August 1971

Romania
3

			1	2	3	4	5
1	(Brazil) (Romania)	José Edison Mandarino; Ilie Năstase	4; 6	1; 6	1; 6
2	(Brazil) (Romania)	Thomaz Koch; Ion Țiriac	4; 6	6; 4	6; 3	9; 7
3	(Brazil) (Romania)	Thomaz Koch / José Edison Mandarino; Ilie Năstase / Ion Țiriac	1; 6	6; 3	6; 3	3; 6	6; 4
4	(Brazil) (Romania)	Thomaz Koch; Ilie Năstase	4; 6	0; 6	6; 8
5	(Brazil) (Romania)	José Edison Mandarino; Ion Țiriac	0; 6	2; 6	4; 6

== Challenge Round ==
United States vs. Romania

United States
3
Olde Providence Racquet Club, Charlotte, North Carolina, United States
8–11 October 1971
Clay

Romania
2

			1	2	3	4	5
1	(United States) (Romania)	Stan Smith; Ilie Năstase	7; 5	6; 3	6; 1
2	(United States) (Romania)	Frank Froehling; Ion Țiriac	3; 6	1; 6	6; 1	6; 3	8; 6
3	(United States) (Romania)	Stan Smith / Erik van Dillen; Ilie Năstase / Ion Țiriac	5; 7	4; 6	6; 8
4	(United States) (Romania)	Stan Smith; Ion Țiriac	8; 6	6; 3	6; 0
5	(United States) (Romania)	Frank Froehling; Ilie Năstase	3; 6	1; 6	6; 1	4; 6
