= United States Davis Cup team =

Davis Cup team representing the USA

United States of America
- Captain: Bob Bryan
- Nations Ranking: 7 ▼ (September 21, 2026)
- Highest ranking: 1 (2008)
- Colors: Red & Blue
- First year: United States 3–0 (United Kingdom) British Isles (Longwood Cricket Club, Boston, Massachusetts, United States; August 8–10, 1900)
- Years played: 111
- Ties played (W–L): 314 (232–82)
- Years in World Group: 44 (77–39)
- Davis Cup titles: 32 (1900, 1902, 1913, 1920, 1921, 1922, 1923, 1924, 1925, 1926, 1937, 1938, 1946, 1947, 1948, 1949, 1954, 1958, 1963, 1968, 1969, 1970, 1971, 1972, 1978, 1979, 1981, 1982, 1990, 1992, 1995, 2007)
- Runners-up: 29 (1903, 1905, 1906, 1908, 1909, 1911, 1914, 1927, 1928, 1929, 1930, 1932, 1934, 1935, 1939, 1950, 1951, 1952, 1953, 1955, 1956, 1957, 1959, 1964, 1973, 1984, 1991, 1997, 2004)
- Most total wins: John McEnroe (59–10)
- Most singles wins: John McEnroe (41–8)
- Most doubles wins: Mike Bryan (28–5)
- Best doubles team: Bob Bryan/Mike Bryan (25–5)
- Most ties played: Mike Bryan (33)
- Most years played: Bob Bryan and Mike Bryan (15)

The United States men's national tennis team represents the United States in Davis Cup tennis competition, and is governed by the United States Tennis Association.

The United States competed in the inaugural Davis Cup against Great Britain in 1900. They are the most successful team ever to compete in the Davis Cup, winning the coveted title on 32 separate occasions closely followed by Australia with 28 victories.

== History ==
The United States competed in the first Davis Cup in 1900, when a group of Harvard University students challenged the British. The team won this inaugural competition, then called the International Lawn Tennis Challenge, by defeating Great Britain 3–0 in Boston at the Longwood Cricket Club grounds. The format and trophy for the contest was designed and paid for by American player, Dwight Davis, whom the current competition is named after.

The United States most recent win was in 2007, defeating Russia in the final.He is died in 1993 at 49.

The United States played in the World Group in all but one year (1988) since it was created in 1981, sharing this record with the Czech Republic, and holds the record for ongoing consecutive years in the World Group at 30 as of 2018.

== Rivalries ==
=== with Australia ===
The United States and Australia have been the two most dominant teams in Davis Cup history, forging an intense rivalry over the years. Between the pair, they have won the Davis Cup on 60 occasions (United States 32, Australia 28). They have faced off in the Davis Cup Final 29 times, with Australia edging the battle 15–14. The United States were defeated by Australia in the first three Davis Cup Finals (then known as the International Lawn Tennis Challenge) in 1908, 1909 and 1911.

Due the inception of the World Group in 1981, there have been fewer meetings between the two nations, somewhat stunting the rivalry. The last meeting between the pair was in the 2024 Davis Cup quarterfinals, with Australia progressing to the semifinals.

The total meetings between Australia and the United States stands at 48, with the United States leading the head-to-head 26–22.

== Results and fixtures ==
The following are lists of match results and scheduled matches for the current year.

Win Loss Fixture

=== 2026 ===
2026 Davis Cup Qualifiers first round

Hungary
0
Tatabányai Multifunkcionális Sportcsarnok, Tatabánya, Hungary
February 7–8, 2026
Clay (i)

United States
4

			1	2	3
1	(Hungary) (United States)	Zsombor Piros; Tommy Paul	6^{3} 7^{7}	3; 6
2	(Hungary) (United States)	Fábián Marozsán; Ethan Quinn	6; 3	3; 6	6^{11} 7^{13}
3	(Hungary) (United States)	Fábián Marozsán / Zsombor Piros; Christian Harrison / Austin Krajicek	4; 6	6; 3	3; 6
4	(Hungary) (United States)	Matyas Fuele; Emilio Nava	2; 6	3; 6
5	(Hungary) (United States)	Zsombor Piros; Ethan Quinn				not played

2026 Davis Cup Qualifiers second round

Czech Republic
3
O_{2} Arena, Prague, Czech Republic
September 18–19, 2026
Hard (i)

United States
2

			1	2	3
1	(Czech Republic) (United States)	Jakub Menšík; Learner Tien	2; 6	4; 6
2	(Czech Republic) (United States)	Jiří Lehečka; Ben Shelton	6; 4	6; 4
3	(Czech Republic) (United States)	Adam Pavlásek / Patrik Rikl; Christian Harrison / Austin Krajicek	7; 5	3; 6	6^{8} 7^{10}
4	(Czech Republic) (United States)	Jakub Menšík; Ben Shelton	5; 7	6; 4	6; 3
5	(Czech Republic) (United States)	Jiří Lehečka; Learner Tien	6; 3	7; 5

== Players ==
=== Current team ===
Team Nominations for match First Round Qualifiers against Hungary
Player	Born	ATP ranking		Debut	Nom	Ties	Win-loss			Profile
Player	Born	Singles	Doubles	Debut	Nom	Ties	Singles	Doubles	Total	Profile
Tommy Paul	May 17, 1997 (age 29)	22	501	2021	7	10	5–3	0–2	5–5	
Ethan Quinn	March 12, 2004 (age 22)	68	503	2026			–	–	–	
Emilio Nava	December 2, 2001 (age 24)	82	941	2026			–	–	–	
Austin Krajicek	June 16, 1990 (age 36)	–	52	2023	7	10	–	8–2	8–2	
Christian Harrison	May 29, 1994 (age 32)	–	11	2026			–	–	–	
Non-playing captain: Bob Bryan

== Captains ==
Name	Tenure	Best result
Perry Jones	1958–59	Champion (1958)
David Freed	1960–61	Inter-Zonal Final (1960, 1961)
Bob Kelleher	1962–63	Champion (1963)
Vic Seixas	1964	Runner-up (1964)
George MacCall	1965–67	Inter-Zonal Semifinals (1965, 1966)
Donald Dell	1968–69	Champion (1968, 1969)
Ed Turville	1970–71	Champion (1970, 1971)
Dennis Ralston	1972–75	Champion (1972)
Tony Trabert	1976–80	Champion (1978, 1979)
Arthur Ashe	1981–85	Champion (1981, 1982)
Tom Gorman	1986–93	Champion (1990, 1992)
Tom Gullikson	1994–99	Champion (1995)
John McEnroe	2000	Semifinals (2000)
Patrick McEnroe	2001–10	Champion (2007)
Jim Courier	2011–18	Semifinals (2012, 2018)
Mardy Fish	2019–22	Quarterfinals (2022)
Bob Bryan	2023–	Quarterfinals (2024)

- Prior to 1958 most U.S. Davis Cup captains were player-captains.

== Historical results ==
Here is the list of all match-ups since 1981, when the competition started being held in the current World Group format.

=== 1980s ===
Year	Competition	Date	Location	Opponent	Score	Result
1981	World Group, First Round	March 6–8	Carlsbad (USA)	Mexico	3–2	Win
1981	World Group, Quarterfinals	July 9–11	New York City (USA)	Czechoslovakia	4–1	Win
1981	World Group, Semifinals	October 2–4	Portland (USA)	Australia	5–0	Win
1981	World Group, Final	December 11–13	Cincinnati (USA)	Argentina	3–1	Champion
1982	World Group, First Round	March 5–7	Carlsbad (USA)	India	4–1	Win
1982	World Group, Quarterfinals	July 9–11	St. Louis (USA)	Sweden	3–2	Win
1982	World Group, Semifinals	October 1–3	Perth (AUS)	Australia	5–0	Win
1982	World Group, Final	November 26–28	Grenoble (FRA)	France	4–1	Champion
1983	World Group, First Round	March 4–6	Buenos Aires (ARG)	Argentina	2–3	Loss
1983	World Group Playoffs	September 30 – October 2	Dublin (IRL)	Ireland	4–1	Win
1984	World Group, First Round	February 24–26	Bucharest (ROU)	Romania	5–0	Win
1984	World Group, Quarterfinals	July 13–15	Atlanta (USA)	Argentina	5–0	Win
1984	World Group, Semifinals	September 28–30	Portland (USA)	Australia	4–1	Win
1984	World Group, Final	December 16–18	Gothenburg (SWE)	Sweden	1–4	Runner-up
1985	World Group, First Round	March 8–10	Kyoto (JPN)	Japan	5–0	Win
1985	World Group, Quarterfinals	August 2–4	Hamburg (FRG)	West Germany	2–3	Loss
1986	World Group, First Round	March 7–10	Guayaquil (ECU)	Ecuador	3–2	Win
1986	World Group, Quarterfinals	July 18–20	Mexico City (MEX)	Mexico	4–1	Win
1986	World Group, Semifinals	October 3–5	Brisbane (AUS)	Australia	1–3	Loss
1987	World Group, First Round	March 13–15	Asunción (PAR)	Paraguay	2–3	Loss
1987	World Group Playoffs	July 24–26	Hartford (USA)	West Germany	2–3	Loss
1988	Americas Group I, Semifinals	April 8–10	Lima (PER)	Peru	3–0	Win
1988	Americas Group I, Final	July 22–24	Buenos Aires (ARG)	Argentina	4–1	Win
1989	World Group, First Round	February 3–5	Ft. Myers (USA)	Paraguay	5–0	Win
1989	World Group, Quarterfinals	April 7–9	San Diego (USA)	France	5–0	Win
1989	World Group, Semifinals	July 21–23	Munich (FRG)	West Germany	2–3	Loss

=== 1990s ===
Year	Competition	Date	Location	Opponent	Score	Result
1990	World Group, First Round	February 2–4	Carlsbad (USA)	Mexico	4–0	Win
1990	World Group, Quarterfinals	March 30 – April 2	Prague (TCH)	Czechoslovakia	4–1	Win
1990	World Group, Semifinals	September 21–23	Vienna (AUT)	Austria	3–2	Win
1990	World Group, Final	November 30 – December 2	St. Petersburg (USA)	Australia	3–2	Champion
1991	World Group, First Round	February 1 – March 31	Mexico City (MEX)	Mexico	3–2	Win
1991	World Group, Quarterfinals	Mar – Apr	Newport (USA)	Spain	4–1	Win
1991	World Group, Semifinals	September 20–22	Kansas City (USA)	Germany	3–2	Win
1991	World Group, Final	November 29 – December 1	Lyon (France)	France	1–3	Runner-up
1992	World Group, First Round	January 31 – February 2	Mauna Lani (USA)	Argentina	5–0	Win
1992	World Group, Quarterfinals	March 27–29	Ft. Myers (USA)	Czechoslovakia	3–2	Win
1992	World Group, Semifinals	September 25–27	Minneapolis (USA)	Sweden	4–1	Win
1992	World Group, Final	December 4–6	Fort Worth (USA)	Switzerland	3–1	Champion
1993	World Group, First Round	March 26–28	Melbourne (AUS)	Australia	1–4	Loss
1993	World Group Playoffs	September 22–26	Charlotte (USA)	Bahamas	5–0	Win
1994	World Group, First Round	February 25–27	New Delhi (IND)	India	5–0	Win
1994	World Group, Quarterfinals	July 15–17	Rotterdam (NED)	Netherlands	3–2	Win
1994	World Group, Semifinals	September 23–25	Gothenburg (SWE)	Sweden	2–3	Loss
1995	World Group, First Round	February 3–5	St. Petersburg (USA)	France	4–1	Win
1995	World Group, Quarterfinals	March 31 – April 2	Palermo (ITA)	Italy	5–0	Win
1995	World Group, Semifinals	September 22–24	Las Vegas (USA)	Sweden	4–1	Win
1995	World Group, Final	December 1–3	Moscow (RUS)	Russia	3–2	Champion
1996	World Group, First Round	February 9–11	Carlsbad (USA)	Mexico	5–0	Win
1996	World Group, Quarterfinals	April 5–7	Prague (CZE)	Czech Republic	2–3	Loss
1997	World Group, First Round	February 7–9	Ribeirão Preto (BRA)	Brazil	4–1	Win
1997	World Group, Quarterfinals	April 4–6	Newport Beach (USA)	Netherlands	4–1	Win
1997	World Group, Semifinals	September 19–21	Washington, D.C. (USA)	Australia	4–1	Win
1997	World Group, Final	November 28–30	Gothenburg (SWE)	Sweden	0–5	Runner-up
1998	World Group, First Round	April 3–5	Atlanta (USA)	Russia	3–2	Win
1998	World Group, Quarterfinals	July 17–19	Indianapolis (USA)	Belgium	4–1	Win
1998	World Group, Semifinals	September 25–27	Milwaukee (USA)	Italy	1–4	Loss
1999	World Group, First Round	April 2–4	Birmingham (GBR)	Great Britain	3–2	Win
1999	World Group, Quarterfinals	July 16–18	Chestnut Hill (USA)	Australia	1–4	Loss

=== 2000s ===
Year	Competition	Date	Location	Opponent	Score	Result
2000	World Group, First Round	February 4–6	Harare (ZIM)	Zimbabwe	3–2	Win
2000	World Group, Quarterfinals	April 7–9	Inglewood (USA)	Czech Republic	3–2	Win
2000	World Group, Semifinals	July 21–23	Santander (ESP)	Spain	0–5	Loss
2001	World Group, First Round	February 9–11	Basel (SUI)	Switzerland	2–3	Loss
2001	World Group Playoffs	September 21–23	Winston-Salem (USA)	India	4–1	Win
2002	World Group, First Round	February 8–10	Oklahoma City (USA)	Slovakia	5–0	Win
2002	World Group, Quarterfinals	April 5–7	Houston (USA)	Spain	3–1	Win
2002	World Group, Semifinals	September 20–22	Paris (FRA)	France	2–3	Loss
2003	World Group, First Round	February 7–9	Zagreb (CRO)	Croatia	1–4	Loss
2003	World Group Playoffs	September 19–21	Bratislava (SVK)	Slovakia	3–2	Win
2004	World Group, First Round	February 6–8	Uncasville (USA)	Austria	5–0	Win
2004	World Group, Quarterfinals	April 9–11	Delray Beach (USA)	Sweden	4–1	Win
2004	World Group, Semifinals	September 24–26	Charleston (USA)	Belarus	4–0	Win
2004	World Group, Final	December 3–5	Seville (ESP)	Spain	2–3	Runner-up
2005	World Group, First Round	March 4–6	Los Angeles (USA)	Croatia	2–3	Loss
2005	World Group Playoffs	September 23–25	Leuven (BEL)	Belgium	4–1	Win
2006	World Group, First Round	February 10–12	La Jolla (USA)	Romania	4–1	Win
2006	World Group, Quarterfinals	April 7–9	Rancho Mirage (USA)	Chile	3–2	Win
2006	World Group, Semifinals	September 22–24	Moscow (RUS)	Russia	2–3	Loss
2007	World Group, First Round	February 9–11	Ostrava (CZE)	Czech Republic	4–1	Win
2007	World Group, Quarterfinals	April 6–8	Winston-Salem (USA)	Spain	4–1	Win
2007	World Group, Semifinals	September 21–23	Gothenburg (SWE)	Sweden	4–1	Win
2007	World Group, Final	November 30 – December 2	Portland (USA)	Russia	4–1	Champion
2008	World Group, First Round	February 8–10	Vienna (AUT)	Austria	4–1	Win
2008	World Group, Quarterfinals	April 11–13	Winston-Salem (USA)	France	4–1	Win
2008	World Group, Semifinals	September 19–21	Madrid (ESP)	Spain	1–4	Loss
2009	World Group, First Round	March 6–8	Birmingham (USA)	Switzerland	4–1	Win
2009	World Group, Quarterfinals	July 10–12	Poreč (CRO)	Croatia	2–3	Loss

=== 2010s ===
Year	Competition	Date	Location	Opponent	Score	Result
2010	World Group, First Round	March 5–7	Belgrade (SRB)	Serbia	2–3	Loss
2010	World Group Playoffs	September 17–19	Bogotá (COL)	Colombia	3–1	Win
2011	World Group, First Round	March 4–6	Santiago (CHI)	Chile	4–1	Win
2011	World Group, Quarterfinals	July 8–10	Austin (USA)	Spain	1–3	Loss
2012	World Group, First Round	February 10–12	Fribourg (SUI)	Switzerland	5–0	Win
2012	World Group, Quarterfinals	April 6–8	Roquebrune (FRA)	France	3–2	Win
2012	World Group, Semifinals	September 14–16	Gijón (ESP)	Spain	1–3	Loss
2013	World Group, First Round	February 1–3	Jacksonville (USA)	Brazil	3–2	Win
2013	World Group, Quarterfinals	April 5–7	Boise (USA)	Serbia	1–3	Loss
2014	World Group, First Round	Jan 31 – Feb 2	San Diego (USA)	Great Britain	1–3	Loss
2014	World Group Playoffs	September 12–14	Chicago (USA)	Slovakia	5–0	Win
2015	World Group, First Round	March 6–8	Glasgow (GBR)	Great Britain	2–3	Loss
2015	World Group Playoffs	September 18–20	Tashkent (UZB)	Uzbekistan	3–1	Win
2016	World Group, First Round	March 4–6	Melbourne (AUS)	Australia	3–1	Win
2016	World Group, Quarterfinals	July 15–17	Beaverton (USA)	Croatia	2−3	Loss
2017	World Group, First Round	February 3–5	Birmingham (USA)	Switzerland	5−0	Win
2017	World Group, Quarterfinals	April 7–9	Brisbane (AUS)	Australia	2−3	Loss
2018	World Group, First Round	February 2–4	Niš (SRB)	Serbia	3−0	Win
2018	World Group, Quarterfinals	April 6–8	Nashville (USA)	Belgium	4−0	Win
2018	World Group, Semifinals	September 14–16	Zadar (CRO)	Croatia	2−3	Loss
2019	Finals, Group F	November 19	Madrid (ESP)	Canada	1−2	Loss
2019	Finals, Group F	November 20	Madrid (ESP)	Italy	2−1	Win

=== 2020s ===
Year	Competition	Date	Location	Opponent	Score	Result
2020–21	Qualifying round	March 6–7	Honolulu (USA)	Uzbekistan	4−0	Win
2020–21	Finals, Group E	November 26	Turin (ITA)	Italy	1−2	Loss
2020–21	Finals, Group E	November 28	Turin (ITA)	Colombia	1−2	Loss
2022	Qualifying round	March 4–5	Reno (USA)	Colombia	4−0	Win
2022	Finals, Group D	September 14	Glasgow (GBR)	Great Britain	2−1	Win
2022	Finals, Group D	September 15	Glasgow (GBR)	Kazakhstan	2−1	Win
2022	Finals, Group D	September 17	Glasgow (GBR)	Netherlands	1–2	Loss
2022	Finals, Quarterfinals	November 24	Málaga (ESP)	Italy	1–2	Loss
2023	Qualifying round	February 3–4	Tashkent (UZB)	Uzbekistan	4–0	Win
2023	Finals, Group D	September 13	Split (CRO)	Croatia	2–1	Win
2023	Finals, Group D	September 14	Split (CRO)	Netherlands	1–2	Loss
2023	Finals, Group D	September 16	Split (CRO)	Finland	0–3	Loss
2024	Qualifying round	February 1–2	Vilnius (LTU)	Ukraine	4–0	Win
2024	Finals, Group C	September 11	Zhuhai (CHN)	Chile	3–0	Win
2024	Finals, Group C	September 13	Zhuhai (CHN)	Slovakia	3–0	Win
2024	Finals, Group C	September 14	Zhuhai (CHN)	Germany	2–1	Win
2024	Finals, Quarterfinals	November 21	Málaga (ESP)	Australia	1–2	Loss
2025	Qualifiers, First Round	January 30 – February 2	Taipei (TPE)	Chinese Taipei	4–0	Win
2025	Qualifiers, Second Round	September 12–14	Delray Beach (USA)	Czech Republic	2–3	Loss
2026	Qualifiers, First Round	February 7–8	Tatabánya (HUN)	Hungary	4–0	Win
2026	Qualifiers, Second Round	September 18–19	Prague (CZE)	Czech Republic	2–3	Loss

== Statistics ==
=== Player records ===
Most ties played
#	Name	Years	Times played	Win–loss			Win %
#	Name	Years	Times played	Singles	Doubles	Total	Win %
1	Mike Bryan	2003–2020	33	0–1	28–5	28–6	82.4%
2	Bob Bryan	2003–2020	31	4–2	26–5	30–7	81.1%
3	John McEnroe	1978–1992	30	41–8	18–2	59–10	85.5%
4	Andy Roddick	2001–2011	25	33–12	0–0	33–12	73.3%
5	Stan Smith	1968–1981	24	15–4	20–3	35–7	83.3%
5	Wilmer Allison	1928–1936	24	18–10	14–2	32–12	72.7%
5	John Van Ryn	1929–1936	24	7–1	22–2	29–3	90.6%
8	Vic Seixas	1951–1957	23	24–12	14–5	38–17	69.1%
9	Andre Agassi	1988–2005	22	30–6	0–0	30–6	83.3%
10	Arthur Ashe	1963–1978	18	27–5	1–1	28–6	82.3%
10	George Lott	1928–1934	18	7–4	11–0	18–4	81.8%
10	John Isner	2010–2021	18	15–13	2–0	17–13	56.7%
10	Todd Martin	1986–1992	18	11–8	5–6	16–14	53.3%

=== Team records ===
The statistics reflect results since the 1900 Davis Cup, and are up-to-date as of the 2025 Davis Cup Qualifiers second round.

==== Key to eras and positions result ====
- Challenge Round era (1900–1971): The previous Davis Cup Champion would have a bye to and host the Challenge Round Final. Thus the losing team in the Final (or Inter-zonal final) was the third-placed team. For the purposes of this table, the third placed team is grouped as semifinalists and the Zonal finalists (fourth and fifth placed teams) are grouped as quarterfinalists.
- 1972–1980: The previous Davis Cup Champion now had to compete in all rounds. There were four zones consisting of America, Eastern, Europe A and Europe B, with the competition culminating in a four team knockout between zonal winners. The zonal finalists were the equivalent of Davis Cup quarterfinalists.
- Since 1981: World Group (1981–2018), Davis Cup Finals (from 2019) consisting of 16 or 18 teams.
- Abbreviations: POW = Winner of World Group Playoff (1981–2018); POL = Lost in World Group Playoff (1981–2018); GS = Did not advance past the Group Stage of the Davis Cup Finals (from 2019)

==== Results table ====
Result	Total	Challenge Round era (1900–1971)		Post-Challenge Round era			
Result	Total	Challenge Round era (1900–1971)		1972–1980		Since 1981	
Result	Total	#	Years	#	Years	#	Years
Champions	32	23	1900, 1902, 1913, 1920, 1921, 1922, 1923, 1924, 1925, 1926, 1937, 1938, 1946, 1947, 1948, 1949, 1954, 1958, 1963, 1968, 1969, 1970, 1971	3	1972, 1978, 1979	6	1981, 1982, 1990, 1992, 1995, 2007
Runners-Up	29	24	1903, 1905, 1906, 1908, 1909, 1911, 1914, 1927, 1928, 1929, 1930, 1932, 1934, 1935, 1939, 1950, 1951, 1952, 1953, 1955, 1956, 1957, 1959, 1964	1	1973	4	1984, 1991, 1997, 2004
Semifinalists	16	6	1907, 1912, 1931, 1933, 1960, 1961	0	—	10	1986, 1989, 1994, 1998, 2000, 2002, 2006, 2008, 2012, 2018
Quarterfinalists	16	3	1936, 1965, 1966	3	1974, 1977, 1980	10	1985, 1996, 1999, 2009, 2011, 2013, 2016, 2017, 2022, 2024
Other results
Not in Top 5 (Note: Challenge Round era (1905–1971) only) or Zonal Final; (Note: 1972–1980); Lost in First Round (Note: World Group (1981–2018) only) or Group Stage (Note: Davis Cup Finals (from 2019) only)	16	2	1962, 1967	2	1975, 1976	12	POW (8): 1983, 1993, 2001, 2003, 2005, 2010, 2014, 2015 POL (1): 1987 GS (3): 2019, 2020–21, 2023
Not in World Group or Davis Cup Finals	1	—		—		1	1988 (Note: World Group Playoff winner)

Home and away records (since 1981)

- Performance at home (54 match-ups): 45–9
- Performance away (60 match-ups): 35–25
- Performance neutral (13 match-ups): 6–7
- Total: 86–41
- Has never played against 8 countries which, at one point or another, played in the World Group: Denmark, Indonesia, Israel, New Zealand, South Africa, South Korea, Soviet Union, SFR Yugoslavia.

=== Head-to-head records ===
The statistics reflect results since the 1981 Davis Cup, and are up-to-date as of the 2025 Davis Cup Qualifiers second round.

Record against countries

DC team	Ties	Won	Lost
Argentina	5	4	1
Australia	11	6	5
Austria	3	3	0
Bahamas	1	1	0
Belarus	1	1	0
Belgium	3	3	0
Brazil	2	2	0
Canada	1	0	1
Chile	3	3	0
Chinese Taipei	1	1	0
Colombia	3	2	1
Croatia	6	1	5
Czech Republic*	7	5	2
Ecuador	1	1	0
Finland	1	0	1
France	7	5	2
Germany**	5	2	3
Great Britain	4	2	2
India	3	3	0
Ireland	1	1	0
Italy	5	2	3
Japan	1	1	0
Kazakhstan	1	1	0
Mexico	5	5	0
Netherlands	4	2	2
Paraguay	2	1	1
Peru	1	1	0
Romania	2	2	0
Russia	4	3	1
Serbia	3	1	2
Slovakia	4	4	0
Spain	8	3	5
Sweden	8	5	3
Switzerland	5	4	1
Ukraine	1	1	0
Uzbekistan	3	3	0
Zimbabwe	1	1	0
Total (37)	127	86	41

* includes Czechoslovakia (3–0)
** includes West Germany (0–3)

Record against continents

Africa	Asia	Oceania
Zimbabwe	Chinese Taipei; India; Japan; Kazakhstan; Uzbekistan	Australia
Record: 1–0	Record: 9–0	Record: 6–5
Europe	North America	South America
Austria; Belarus; Belgium; Croatia; Czech Republic*; Finland; France; Germany**; Great Britain; Ireland; Italy; Netherlands; Romania; Russia; Serbia; Slovakia; Spain; Sweden; Switzerland; Ukraine	Bahamas; Canada; Mexico	Argentina; Brazil; Chile; Colombia; Ecuador; Paraguay; Peru
Record: 50–32	Record: 6–1	Record: 14–3

Records by decade

- 2020–2029: 11–8
- 2010–2019: 12–10
- 2000–2009: 19–9
- 1990–1999: 25–7
- 1981–1989: 19–7
- Total: 86–41

== Junior Davis Cup ==
The United States won the Junior Davis Cup five times, most recently in 2025.

=== Final results ===
Year	Competition round	Host city	Opponent	Score	Result
1985	Final	(Japan) Kobe	Australia	1–2	Runner-up
1986	Final	(Japan) Tokyo	Australia	1–2	Runner-up
1988	Final	(Australia) Perth	Czechoslovakia	1–2	Runner-up
1991	Semifinals	(Spain) Barcelona	Germany	1–2	Fourth place
1994	Semifinals	(United States) Tucson	Italy	3–0	Third place
1995	Semifinals	(Germany) Essen	Sweden	1–2	Fourth place
1997	Semifinals	(Canada) Vancouver	Great Britain	0–2	Fourth place
1999	Final	(Australia) Perth	Croatia	3–0	Champion
2002	Final	(France) La Baule-Escoublac	Spain	0–3	Runner-up
2003	Semifinals	(Germany) Essen	Venezuela	1–2	Fourth place
2008	Final	(Mexico) San Luis Potosí	Argentina	2–0	Champion
2012	Semifinals	(Spain) Barcelona	France	2–0	Third place
2014	Final	(Mexico) San Luis Potosí	South Korea	3–0	Champion
2016	Semifinals	(Hungary) Budapest	Argentina	1–2	Fourth place
2017	Final	(Hungary) Budapest	Czech Republic	0–2	Runner-up
2019	Final	(United States) Orlando	Japan	1–2	Runner-up
2022	Final	(Turkey) Antalya	Brazil	0–2	Runner-up
2023	Semifinals	(Spain) Córdoba	Spain	2–1	Third place
2024	Final	(Turkey) Antalya	Romania	2–0	Champion
2025	Final	(Chile) Santiago	Japan	2–0	Champion
2026	Round Robin	(Egypt) Cairo	Hungary	3–0	9th place

== See also ==
- Davis Cup
- United States Billie Jean King Cup team
- United States at the Hopman Cup
- United States Tennis Association
