= 1966 Davis Cup =

1966 edition of the Davis Cup

Details
- Duration: 19 March – 28 December 1966
- Edition: 55th
- Teams: 46

Champion
- Winning nation: Australia

The 1966 Davis Cup was the 55th edition of the Davis Cup, the most important tournament between national teams in men's tennis. 32 teams entered the Europe Zone, 8 teams entered the Eastern Zone, and 6 teams entered the America Zone.

For this year's competition the Europe Zone was split into two sub-zones. 16 teams competed in each sub-zone, with the winners of both sub-zones progressing to the Inter-Zonal Zone. This meant that 4 teams would now compete in the Inter-Zonal Zone for the right to challenge the defending champions Australia.

The United States defeated Mexico in the America Zone final, India defeated Japan in the Eastern Inter-Zonal final, and Brazil and West Germany were the winners of the two Europe sub-zones, defeating France and South Africa respectively.

In the Inter-Zonal Zone, India defeated West Germany and Brazil defeated the United States in the semifinals, and then India defeated Brazil in the final. India was then defeated by Australia in the Challenge Round. The final was played at Kooyong Stadium in Melbourne, Australia on 26–28 December.

== America Zone ==
=== Draw ===
Quarterfinals; 8 April–3 May
Mexico
bye
Buenos Aires, Argentina (clay)
Argentina	3
Chile	2
Caracas, Venezuela (hard)
Venezuela	2
Caribbean/West Indies	3
bye
United States

Semifinals; 19–30 May
Mexico City, Mexico (clay)
Mexico	4
Argentina	1
Kingston, Jamaica
Caribbean/West Indies	1
United States	4

Final; 13–15 August
Cleveland, OH, United States (hard)
Mexico	0
United States	5

=== Final ===
United States vs. Mexico

United States
5
Harold Clark Courts, Cleveland, OH, United States
13–15 August 1966
Hard

Mexico
0

			1	2	3	4	5
1	(United States) (Mexico)	Clark Graebner; Joaquín Loyo Mayo	6; 0	4; 6	6; 1	3; 6	6; 3
2	(United States) (Mexico)	Dennis Ralston; Rafael Osuna	6; 4	2; 6	7; 5	6; 1
3	(United States) (Mexico)	Clark Graebner / Dennis Ralston; Joaquín Loyo Mayo / Rafael Osuna	6; 1	6; 4	6; 0
4	(United States) (Mexico)	Cliff Richey; Marcello Lara	11; 13	6; 0	12; 10	6; 4
5	(United States) (Mexico)	Clark Graebner; Rafael Osuna	6; 3	6; 4	6; 4

== Eastern Zone ==
=== Zone A ===
Semifinals; 17–19 April
Seoul, South Korea
Philippines	3
South Korea	2
bye
Japan

Final; 30 April–2 May
Manila, Philippines
Philippines	2
Japan	3

=== Zone B ===
Quarterfinals
Ceylon	w/o
South Vietnam
Malaysia
bye
bye
Iran
bye
India

Semifinals; 19 March–19 April
Kuala Lumpur, Malaysia
Ceylon	4
Malaysia	1
Ahmedabad, India
Iran	0
India	5

Final; 7–9 May
Madras, India
Ceylon	0
India	5

=== Eastern Inter-Zonal Final ===
Japan vs. India

Japan
1
Tokyo, Japan
30 September–3 October 1966

India
4

			1	2	3	4	5
1	(Japan) (India)	Osamu Ishiguro; Ramanathan Krishnan	3; 6	6; 2	2; 6	8; 10
2	(Japan) (India)	Koji Watanabe; Premjit Lall	6; 3	4; 6	6; 3	3; 6	9; 7
3	(Japan) (India)	Osamu Ishiguro / Koji Watanabe; Ramanathan Krishnan / Premjit Lall	2; 6	3; 6	3; 6
4	(Japan) (India)	Osamu Ishiguro; Premjit Lall	6; 2	6; 8	5; 7	8; 10
5	(Japan) (India)	Koji Watanabe; Ramanathan Krishnan	2; 6	5; 7	0; 6

== Europe Zone ==
=== Zone A ===
First Round; 29 April–2 May
Paris, France (clay)
France	4
Romania	1
Helsinki, Finland (clay)
Finland	1
Canada	4
Bratislava, Czechoslovakia (clay)
Czechoslovakia	5
Austria	0
Lisbon, Portugal (clay)
Portugal	2
Israel	3
Szczecin, Poland (clay)
Poland	3
Sweden	2
Istanbul, Turkey
Turkey	0
Egypt	5
Barcelona, Spain (clay)
Spain	4
Yugoslavia	1
Copenhagen, Denmark (clay)
Denmark	0
Brazil	5

Quarterfinals; 13–17 May
Paris, France (clay)
France	5
Canada	0
Prague, Czechoslovakia (clay)
Czechoslovakia	5
Israel	0
Warsaw, Poland
Poland	4
Egypt	1
Barcelona, Spain (clay)
Spain	2
Brazil	3

Semifinals; 10–12 June
Paris, France (clay)
France	4
Czechoslovakia	1
Warsaw, Poland
Poland	1
Brazil	4

Final; 15–17 July
Paris, France (clay)
France	1
Brazil	4

==== Zone A Final ====
France vs. Brazil

France
1
Stade Roland Garros, Paris, France
15–17 July 1966
Clay

Brazil
4

			1	2	3	4	5
1	(France) (Brazil)	Pierre Darmon; José Edison Mandarino	6; 3	3; 6	2; 6	1; 6
2	(France) (Brazil)	François Jauffret; Thomaz Koch	6; 2	1; 6	3; 6	2; 6
3	(France) (Brazil)	Patrice Beust / Daniel Contet; Thomaz Koch / José Edison Mandarino	6; 3	4; 6	7; 5	3; 6	4; 6
4	(France) (Brazil)	François Jauffret; José Edison Mandarino	4; 6	1; 6	7; 5	2; 6
5	(France) (Brazil)	Pierre Darmon; Thomaz Koch	6; 4	9; 7	6; 2

=== Zone B ===
First Round; 22 April–2 May
Mondorf-les-Bains, Luxembourg
Luxembourg	0
Switzerland	5
Freiburg, West Germany (clay)
West Germany	5
Norway	0
Budapest, Hungary
Hungary	4
Greece	1
London, England (clay)
Great Britain	4
New Zealand	1
Bologna, Italy (clay)
Italy	4
Soviet Union	1
Monte Carlo, Monaco
Monaco	1
Morocco	4
Scheveningen, Netherlands (clay)
Netherlands	5
Ireland	0
Brussels, Belgium
Belgium	0
South Africa	5

Quarterfinals; 13–16 May
Lugano, Switzerland
Switzerland	1
West Germany	4
Budapest, Hungary (clay)
Hungary	2
Great Britain	3
Italy	w/o
Morocco
Scheveningen, Netherlands (clay)
Netherlands	1
South Africa	4

Semifinals; 10–12 June
Hanover, West Germany (clay)
West Germany	3
Great Britain	2
Rome, Italy (clay)
Italy	2
South Africa	3

Final; 15–18 July
Munich, West Germany
West Germany	3
South Africa	2

==== Zone B Final ====
West Germany vs. South Africa

West Germany
3
Munich, West Germany
15–18 July 1966

South Africa
2

			1	2	3	4	5
1	(West Germany) (South Africa)	Wilhelm Bungert; Cliff Drysdale	6; 3	0; 6	8; 6	6; 4
2	(West Germany) (South Africa)	Ingo Buding; Keith Diepraam	6; 2	6; 1	1; 6	6; 4
3	(West Germany) (South Africa)	Ingo Buding / Harald Elschenbroich; Keith Diepraam / Frew McMillan	1; 6	7; 5	6; 1	5; 7	5; 7
4	(West Germany) (South Africa)	Wilhelm Bungert; Keith Diepraam	12; 10	6; 2	6; 3
5	(West Germany) (South Africa)	Ingo Buding; Cliff Drysdale	4; 6	9; 7	5; 7	0; 6

== Inter-Zonal Zone ==
=== Draw ===
Semifinals; 5–14 November
Calcutta, India
EUR-B	West Germany	2
EAS	India	3
Porto Alegre, Brazil (clay)
AME	United States	2
EUR-A	Brazil	3

Final; 4–6 December
Calcutta, India
EAS	India	3
EUR-A	Brazil	2

=== Semifinals ===
India vs. West Germany

India
3
Calcutta, India
12–14 November 1966

West Germany
2

			1	2	3	4	5
1	(India) (West Germany)	Ramanathan Krishnan; Wilhelm Bungert	7; 5	7; 5	6; 4
2	(India) (West Germany)	Jaidip Mukerjea; Ingo Buding	2; 6	6; 5	6; 3	6; 4
3	(India) (West Germany)	Premjit Lall / Jaidip Mukerjea; Ingo Buding / Wilhelm Bungert	1; 6	8; 10	4; 6
4	(India) (West Germany)	Jaidip Mukerjea; Wilhelm Bungert	4; 6	8; 6	8; 6	6; 3
5	(India) (West Germany)	Premjit Lall; Ingo Buding	6; 4	3; 6	6; 3	1; 6	4; 6

Brazil vs. United States

Brazil
3
Club Leopoldina Juvenil, Porto Alegre, Brazil
5–7 November 1966

United States
2

			1	2	3	4	5
1	(Brazil) (United States)	Thomaz Koch; Dennis Ralston	4; 6	4; 6	0; 6
2	(Brazil) (United States)	José Edison Mandarino; Cliff Richey	5; 7	6; 3	7; 5	6; 3
3	(Brazil) (United States)	Thomaz Koch / José Edison Mandarino; Arthur Ashe / Dennis Ralston	5; 7	4; 6	6; 4	2; 6
4	(Brazil) (United States)	Thomaz Koch; Cliff Richey	6; 1	7; 5	6; 1
5	(Brazil) (United States)	José Edison Mandarino; Dennis Ralston	4; 6	6; 4	4; 6	6; 4	6; 1

=== Final ===
India vs. Brazil

India
3
Calcutta, India
4–6 December 1966

Brazil
2

			1	2	3	4	5
1	(India) (Brazil)	Jaidip Mukerjea; Thomaz Koch	2; 6	2; 6	3; 6
2	(India) (Brazil)	Ramanathan Krishnan; José Edison Mandarino	5; 7	6; 2	6; 2	6; 3
3	(India) (Brazil)	Ramanathan Krishnan / Jaidip Mukerjea; Thomaz Koch / José Edison Mandarino	7; 5	3; 6	6; 3	3; 6	6; 3
4	(India) (Brazil)	Jaidip Mukerjea; José Edison Mandarino	7; 9	6; 3	4; 6	6; 3	5; 7
5	(India) (Brazil)	Ramanathan Krishnan; Thomaz Koch	3; 6	6; 4	10; 12	7; 5	6; 2

== Challenge Round ==
Australia vs. India

Australia
4
Kooyong Stadium, Melbourne, Australia
26–28 December 1966
Grass

India
1

			1	2	3	4	5
1	(Australia) (India)	Fred Stolle; Ramanathan Krishnan	6; 3	6; 2	6; 4
2	(Australia) (India)	Roy Emerson; Jaidip Mukerjea	7; 5	6; 4	6; 2
3	(Australia) (India)	John Newcombe / Tony Roche; Ramanathan Krishnan / Jaidip Mukerjea	6; 4	5; 7	4; 6	4; 6
4	(Australia) (India)	Roy Emerson; Ramanathan Krishnan	6; 0	6; 2	10; 8
5	(Australia) (India)	Fred Stolle; Jaidip Mukerjea	7; 5	6; 8	6; 3	5; 7	6; 3
