= 2017 Davis Cup World Group =

2017 edition of the Davis Cup World Group

- Date: 3 March – 26 November
- Edition: 37th

Champions
- France
- Davis Cup

The World Group was the highest level of Davis Cup competition in 2017. The first-round losers went into the Davis Cup World Group play-offs, and the winners progressed to the quarterfinals and the World Group stage of the competition in 2018.

== Participating teams ==
Participating teams
Argentina	Australia	Belgium	Canada
Croatia	Czech Republic	France	Germany
Great Britain	Italy	Japan	Russia
Serbia	Spain	Switzerland	United States

=== Seeds ===
1. Argentina (first round)
2. Croatia (first round)
3. Great Britain (quarterfinals)
4. Czech Republic (first round)
5. Switzerland (first round)
6. France (champion)
7. Belgium (final)
8. Serbia (semifinals)

=== Draw ===
First round 3–5 February
Buenos Aires, Argentina (clay)
1	Argentina	2
Italy	3
Frankfurt, Germany (indoor hard)
7	Belgium	4
Germany	1
Kooyong, Australia (hard)
4	Czech Republic	1
Australia	4
Birmingham, United States (indoor hard)
5	Switzerland	0
United States	5
Tokyo, Japan (indoor hard)
Japan	1
6	France	4
Ottawa, Canada (indoor hard)
Canada	2
3	Great Britain	3
Niš, Serbia (indoor hard)
Russia	1
8	Serbia	4
Osijek, Croatia (indoor hard)
Spain	3
2	Croatia	2

Quarterfinals; 7–9 April
Charleroi, Belgium (indoor hard)
Italy	2
7	Belgium	3
Brisbane, Australia (hard)
Australia	3
United States	2
Rouen, France (indoor clay)
6	France	4
3	Great Britain	1
Belgrade, Serbia (indoor hard)
8	Serbia	4
Spain	1

Semifinals; 15–17 September
Brussels, Belgium (indoor clay)
7	Belgium	3
Australia	2
Villeneuve-d'Ascq, France (clay)
6	France	3
8	Serbia	1

Final; 24–26 November
Villeneuve-d'Ascq, France (indoor hard)
7	Belgium	2
6	France	3

== First round ==
=== Argentina vs. Italy ===
Argentina
2
Parque Sarmiento, Buenos Aires, Argentina
3–6 February
Clay

Italy
3

			1	2	3	4	5
1	(Argentina) (Italy)	Guido Pella; Paolo Lorenzi	3; 6	3; 6	3; 6
2	(Argentina) (Italy)	Carlos Berlocq; Andreas Seppi	1; 6	2; 6	6; 1	6^{6} 7^{8}
3	(Argentina) (Italy)	Carlos Berlocq / Leonardo Mayer; Simone Bolelli / Fabio Fognini	6; 3	6; 3	4; 6	2; 6	7^{9} 6^{7}
4	(Argentina) (Italy)	Carlos Berlocq; Paolo Lorenzi	4; 6	6; 4	6; 1	3; 6	6; 3
5	(Argentina) (Italy)	Guido Pella; Fabio Fognini	6; 2	6; 4	3; 6	4; 6	2; 6

=== Germany vs. Belgium ===
Germany
1
Fraport Arena, Frankfurt, Germany
3–5 February
Hard (i)

Belgium
4

			1	2	3	4	5
1	(Germany) (Belgium)	Philipp Kohlschreiber; Steve Darcis	4; 6	6; 3	6; 2	6^{2} 7^{7}	6^{5} 7^{7}
2	(Germany) (Belgium)	Alexander Zverev; Arthur De Greef	6; 3	6; 3	6; 4
3	(Germany) (Belgium)	Alexander Zverev / Mischa Zverev; Ruben Bemelmans / Joris De Loore	3; 6	6^{3} 7^{7}	6; 4	6; 4	3; 6
4	(Germany) (Belgium)	Alexander Zverev; Steve Darcis	6; 2	4; 6	4; 6	6^{8} 7^{10}
5	(Germany) (Belgium)	Mischa Zverev; Ruben Bemelmans	5; 7	1; 6

=== Australia vs. Czech Republic ===
Australia
4
Kooyong Stadium, Kooyong, Australia
3–5 February
Hard

Czech Republic
1

			1	2	3	4	5
1	(Australia) (Czech Republic)	Jordan Thompson; Jiří Veselý	6; 3	6; 3	6; 4
2	(Australia) (Czech Republic)	Nick Kyrgios; Jan Šátral	6; 2	6; 3	6; 2
3	(Australia) (Czech Republic)	Sam Groth / John Peers; Jan Šátral / Jiří Veselý	6; 3	6; 2	6; 2
4	(Australia) (Czech Republic)	Sam Groth; Jiří Veselý	6; 3	5; 7	3; 6
5	(Australia) (Czech Republic)	Jordan Thompson; Jan Šátral	7^{7} 6^{5}	6; 2

=== United States vs. Switzerland ===
United States
5
Birmingham–Jefferson Convention Complex, Birmingham, United States
3–5 February
Hard (i)

Switzerland
0

			1	2	3	4	5
1	(United States) (Switzerland)	Jack Sock; Marco Chiudinelli	6; 4	6; 3	6; 1
2	(United States) (Switzerland)	John Isner; Henri Laaksonen	4; 6	6; 2	6; 2	7^{7} 6^{1}
3	(United States) (Switzerland)	Steve Johnson / Jack Sock; Adrien Bossel / Henri Laaksonen	7^{7} 6^{3}	6; 3	7^{7} 6^{5}
4	(United States) (Switzerland)	Sam Querrey; Adrien Bossel	6; 3	7; 5
5	(United States) (Switzerland)	Steve Johnson; Antoine Bellier	6; 4	6; 3

=== Japan vs. France ===
Japan
1
Ariake Coliseum, Tokyo, Japan
3–5 February
Hard (i)

France
4

			1	2	3	4	5
1	(Japan) (France)	Taro Daniel; Richard Gasquet	2; 6	3; 6	2; 6
2	(Japan) (France)	Yoshihito Nishioka; Gilles Simon	3; 6	3; 6	4; 6
3	(Japan) (France)	Yūichi Sugita / Yasutaka Uchiyama; Pierre-Hugues Herbert / Nicolas Mahut	3; 6	4; 6	4; 6
4	(Japan) (France)	Yoshihito Nishioka; Nicolas Mahut	1; 6	1; 1				retired
5	(Japan) (France)	Yasutaka Uchiyama; Pierre-Hugues Herbert	6; 4	6; 4

=== Canada vs. Great Britain ===
Canada
2
TD Place Arena, Ottawa, Canada
3–5 February
Hard (i)

Great Britain
3

			1	2	3	4	5
1	(Canada) (United Kingdom)	Denis Shapovalov; Dan Evans	3; 6	3; 6	4; 6
2	(Canada) (United Kingdom)	Vasek Pospisil; Kyle Edmund	6; 4	6; 1	7^{7} 6^{3}
3	(Canada) (United Kingdom)	Daniel Nestor / Vasek Pospisil; Dominic Inglot / Jamie Murray	6^{1} 7^{7}	7^{7} 6^{3}	6^{3} 7^{7}	3; 6
4	(Canada) (United Kingdom)	Vasek Pospisil; Dan Evans	7^{7} 6^{3}	6; 4	3; 6	7^{7} 6^{5}
5	(Canada) (United Kingdom)	Denis Shapovalov; Kyle Edmund	3; 6	4; 6	1^{d} 2

Shapovalov defaulted the rubber and the tie after accidentally hitting a ball into the face of the chair umpire.

=== Serbia vs. Russia ===
Serbia
4
Čair Sports Center, Niš, Serbia
3–5 February
Hard (i)

Russia
1

			1	2	3	4	5
1	(Serbia) (Russia)	Viktor Troicki; Karen Khachanov	6; 4	6^{3} 7^{7}	6; 3	1; 6	7^{8} 6^{6}
2	(Serbia) (Russia)	Novak Djokovic; Daniil Medvedev	3; 6	6; 4	6; 1	1; 0		retired
3	(Serbia) (Russia)	Viktor Troicki / Nenad Zimonjić; Konstantin Kravchuk / Andrey Kuznetsov	6; 3	7^{7} 6^{3}	6^{5} 7^{7}	6; 4
4	(Serbia) (Russia)	Dušan Lajović; Konstantin Kravchuk	6; 3	4; 6	6; 3
5	(Serbia) (Russia)	Nenad Zimonjić; Daniil Medvedev						w/o

=== Croatia vs. Spain ===
Croatia
2
Gradski vrt Hall, Osijek, Croatia
3–5 February
Hard (i)

Spain
3

			1	2	3	4	5
1	(Croatia) (Spain)	Franko Škugor; Pablo Carreño Busta	3; 6	6; 3	6; 4	4; 6	7^{8} 6^{6}
2	(Croatia) (Spain)	Ante Pavić; Roberto Bautista Agut	4; 6	2; 6	3; 6
3	(Croatia) (Spain)	Marin Draganja / Nikola Mektić; Feliciano López / Marc López	6^{6} 7^{8}	7^{9} 6^{7}	7^{7} 6^{5}	2; 6	6; 4
4	(Croatia) (Spain)	Franko Škugor; Roberto Bautista Agut	1; 6	7^{7} 6^{4}	3; 6	6^{6} 7^{8}
5	(Croatia) (Spain)	Nikola Mektić; Pablo Carreño Busta	6^{4} 7^{7}	1; 6	4; 6

== Quarterfinals ==
=== Belgium vs. Italy ===
Belgium
3
RTL Spiroudome, Charleroi, Belgium
7–9 April 2017
Hard (i)

Italy
2

			1	2	3	4	5
1	(Belgium) (Italy)	Steve Darcis; Paolo Lorenzi	6^{3} 7^{7}	6; 1	6; 1	7^{7} 6^{4}
2	(Belgium) (Italy)	David Goffin; Andreas Seppi	6; 4	6; 3	6; 3
3	(Belgium) (Italy)	Ruben Bemelmans / Joris De Loore; Simone Bolelli / Andreas Seppi	6; 4	3; 6	4; 6	6; 3	6^{6} 7^{8}
4	(Belgium) (Italy)	David Goffin; Paolo Lorenzi	6; 3	6; 3	6; 2
5	(Belgium) (Italy)	Joris De Loore; Alessandro Giannessi	4; 6	6^{9} 7^{11}

=== Australia vs. United States ===
Australia
3
Pat Rafter Arena, Brisbane, Australia
7–9 April 2017
Hard

United States
2

			1	2	3	4	5
1	(Australia) (United States)	Jordan Thompson; Jack Sock	6; 3	3; 6	7^{7} 6^{4}	6; 4
2	(Australia) (United States)	Nick Kyrgios; John Isner	7; 5	7^{7} 6^{5}	7^{7} 6^{5}
3	(Australia) (United States)	Sam Groth / John Peers; Steve Johnson / Jack Sock	6; 3	3; 6	2; 6	6; 2	3; 6
4	(Australia) (United States)	Nick Kyrgios; Sam Querrey	7^{7} 6^{4}	6; 3	6; 4
5	(Australia) (United States)	Sam Groth; John Isner	6^{5} 7^{7}	3; 6

=== France vs. Great Britain ===
France
4
Kindarena, Rouen, France
7–9 April 2017
Clay (i)

Great Britain
1

			1	2	3	4	5
1	(France) (United Kingdom)	Lucas Pouille; Kyle Edmund	7; 5	7^{8} 6^{6}	6; 3
2	(France) (United Kingdom)	Jérémy Chardy; Dan Evans	6; 2	6; 3	6; 3
3	(France) (United Kingdom)	Julien Benneteau / Nicolas Mahut; Dominic Inglot / Jamie Murray	7^{9} 6^{7}	5; 7	7; 5	7; 5
4	(France) (United Kingdom)	Julien Benneteau; Dan Evans	1; 6	2; 6
5	(France) (United Kingdom)	Jérémy Chardy; Kyle Edmund	6; 4	6; 3

=== Serbia vs. Spain ===
Serbia
4
Hall Aleksandar Nikolić, Belgrade, Serbia
7–9 April 2017
Hard (i)

Spain
1

			1	2	3	4	5
1	(Serbia) (Spain)	Novak Djokovic; Albert Ramos Viñolas	6; 3	6; 4	6; 2
2	(Serbia) (Spain)	Viktor Troicki; Pablo Carreño Busta	6; 3	6; 4	6; 3
3	(Serbia) (Spain)	Viktor Troicki / Nenad Zimonjić; Pablo Carreño Busta / Marc López	4; 6	7^{7} 6^{4}	6; 0	4; 6	6; 2
4	(Serbia) (Spain)	Dušan Lajović; Jaume Munar	2; 6	6; 1	6; 4
5	(Serbia) (Spain)	Nenad Zimonjić; Albert Ramos Viñolas	2; 6	1; 6

== Semifinals ==
=== Belgium vs. Australia ===
Belgium
3
Palais 12, Brussels, Belgium
15–17 September 2017
Clay (i)

Australia
2

			1	2	3	4	5
1	(Belgium) (Australia)	David Goffin; John Millman	6^{4} 7^{7}	6; 4	6; 3	7; 5
2	(Belgium) (Australia)	Steve Darcis; Nick Kyrgios	3; 6	6; 3	7^{7} 6^{5}	1; 6	2; 6
3	(Belgium) (Australia)	Ruben Bemelmans / Arthur De Greef; John Peers / Jordan Thompson	3; 6	4; 6	0; 6
4	(Belgium) (Australia)	David Goffin; Nick Kyrgios	6^{4} 7^{7}	6; 4	6; 4	6; 4
5	(Belgium) (Australia)	Steve Darcis; Jordan Thompson	6; 4	7; 5	6; 2

=== France vs. Serbia ===
France
3
Stade Pierre-Mauroy, Villeneuve d'Ascq, France
15–17 September 2017
Clay

Serbia
1

			1	2	3	4	5
1	(France) (Serbia)	Lucas Pouille; Dušan Lajović	1; 6	6; 3	6^{7} 7^{9}	6^{5} 7^{7}
2	(France) (Serbia)	Jo-Wilfried Tsonga; Laslo Đere	7^{7} 6^{2}	6; 3	6; 3
3	(France) (Serbia)	Pierre-Hugues Herbert / Nicolas Mahut; Filip Krajinović / Nenad Zimonjić	6; 1	6; 2	7^{7} 6^{3}
4	(France) (Serbia)	Jo-Wilfried Tsonga; Dušan Lajović	2; 6	6; 2	7^{7} 6^{5}	6; 2
5	(France) (Serbia)	Lucas Pouille; Laslo Đere						not played

== Final ==
=== France vs. Belgium ===
France
3
Stade Pierre-Mauroy, Villeneuve d'Ascq, France
24–26 November 2017
Hard (i)

Belgium
2

			1	2	3	4	5
1	(France) (Belgium)	Lucas Pouille; David Goffin	5; 7	3; 6	1; 6
2	(France) (Belgium)	Jo-Wilfried Tsonga; Steve Darcis	6; 3	6; 2	6; 1
3	(France) (Belgium)	Richard Gasquet / Pierre-Hugues Herbert; Ruben Bemelmans / Joris De Loore	6; 1	3; 6	7^{7} 6^{2}	6; 4
4	(France) (Belgium)	Jo-Wilfried Tsonga; David Goffin	6^{5} 7^{7}	3; 6	2; 6
5	(France) (Belgium)	Lucas Pouille; Steve Darcis	6; 3	6; 1	6; 0
