= List of Davis Cup champions =

International men's tennis event

- Current season, competition or edition: 2026 Davis Cup
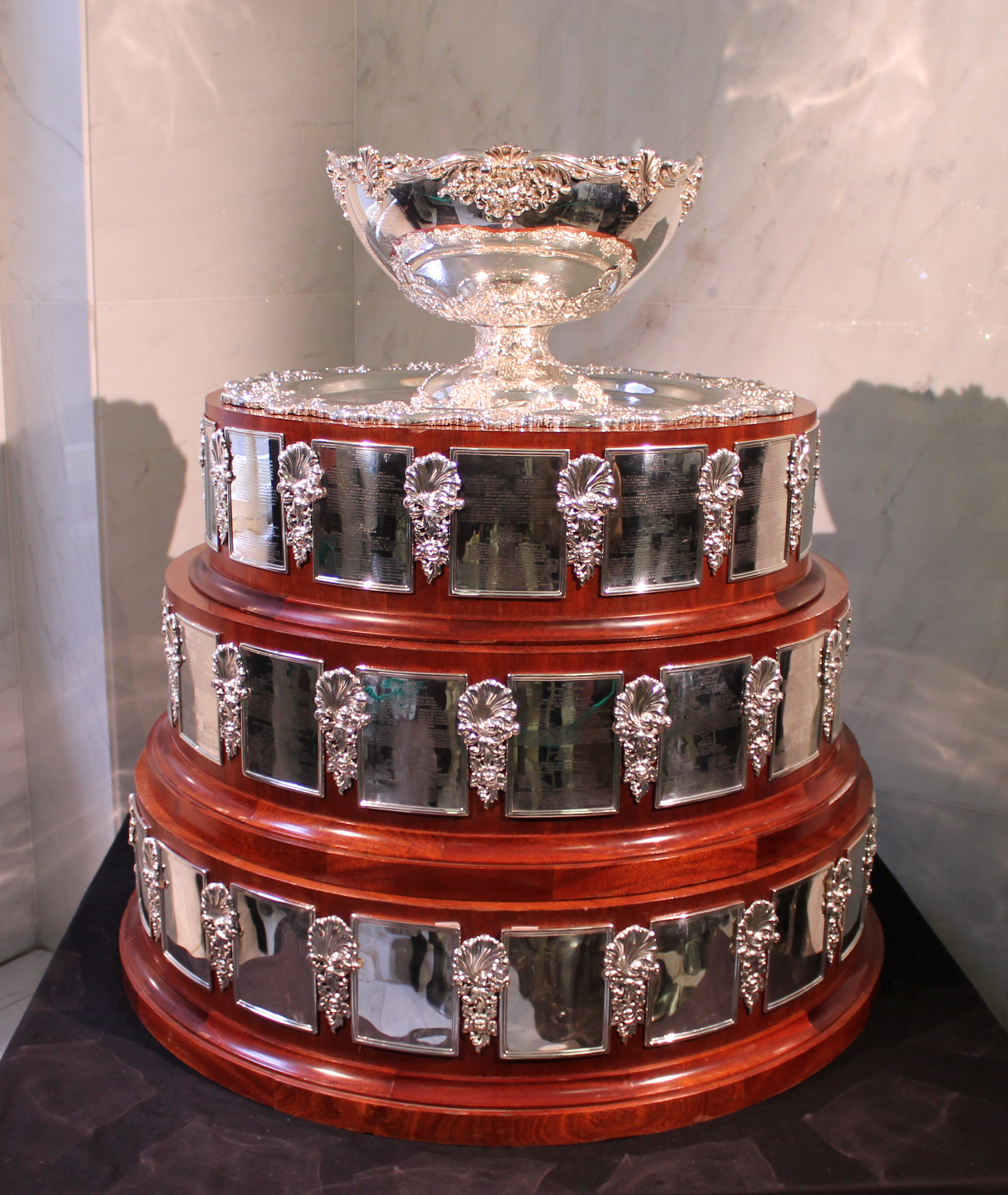
- Sport: Tennis
- Founded: 1900; 126 years ago
- Founder: Dwight F. Davis
- No. of teams: 16 (World Group); 135 (2021 total)
- Countries: World Tennis member nations
- Most recent champion: Italy
- Most titles: United States (32 titles)
- Website: daviscup.com

The Davis Cup is an annual international team event in men's tennis. Established in 1900 as the International Lawn Tennis Challenge, it is run by World Tennis, who describe it as the "World Cup of tennis." The first event in 1900 was a match between Great Britain and the United States, while 135 nations entered the 2016 Davis Cup.

The tournament sees players competing for their country in four singles and one doubles matches, known as rubbers, over the course of three days, with the team that wins three rubbers progressing. The countries are divided into groups based upon their location or performance in previous years. The Davis Cup World Group is the top level of the competition and features matches between players from the top 16 countries at the start of the year. Countries that lose their first round match face a relegation play-off against winning countries from the continental zones. World Group winning countries progress to the quarter-finals. Nations have to win a further three ties in order to claim the position of Davis Cup champions. The United States are the most successful nation in the history of the competition, with 32 victories. Australia are second with 28 (individually or in a combined Australasia team) and Great Britain and France are tied for third with 10. Teams from Europe have won the competition the most with 50 victories, followed by North America with 33 and Oceania with 28.

== History ==
The Davis Cup was founded in 1900 as the International Lawn Tennis Challenge. Four members of Harvard University wished to challenge Great Britain in a tennis competition. One of the American players, Dwight F. Davis, designed a tournament format and ordered a sterling silver trophy from Shreve, Crump & Low for approximately $1,000. The first match, held at Longwood Cricket Club in Boston, Massachusetts, was won by the American team 3–0. There was no match the following year, but the United States retained the trophy in 1902, beating Great Britain 3–2. This was followed by four successive victories for Britain, from 1903 to 1906. The 1904 Davis Cup saw new teams compete for the first time, as Belgium and France entered.

Australasia (Australia and New Zealand) became the first victors outside of Britain and the United States when they won the tournament in 1907. No tournament was held in 1910 as no country challenged Australasia, who retained the trophy until 1912 when they were defeated by Great Britain. The United States and Australasia won the two competitions prior to the outbreak of the First World War, in 1914. The tournament resumed in 1919, with Australasia retaining the trophy, beating Great Britain 4–1. The Americans won the following seven tournaments before they were defeated 3–2 by France in 1927. The tournament underwent restructuring for the 1923 edition. Teams were split into two zones; the 'America Zone' and 'Europe Zone', with the winners playing each other to determine who would face the defending champions.

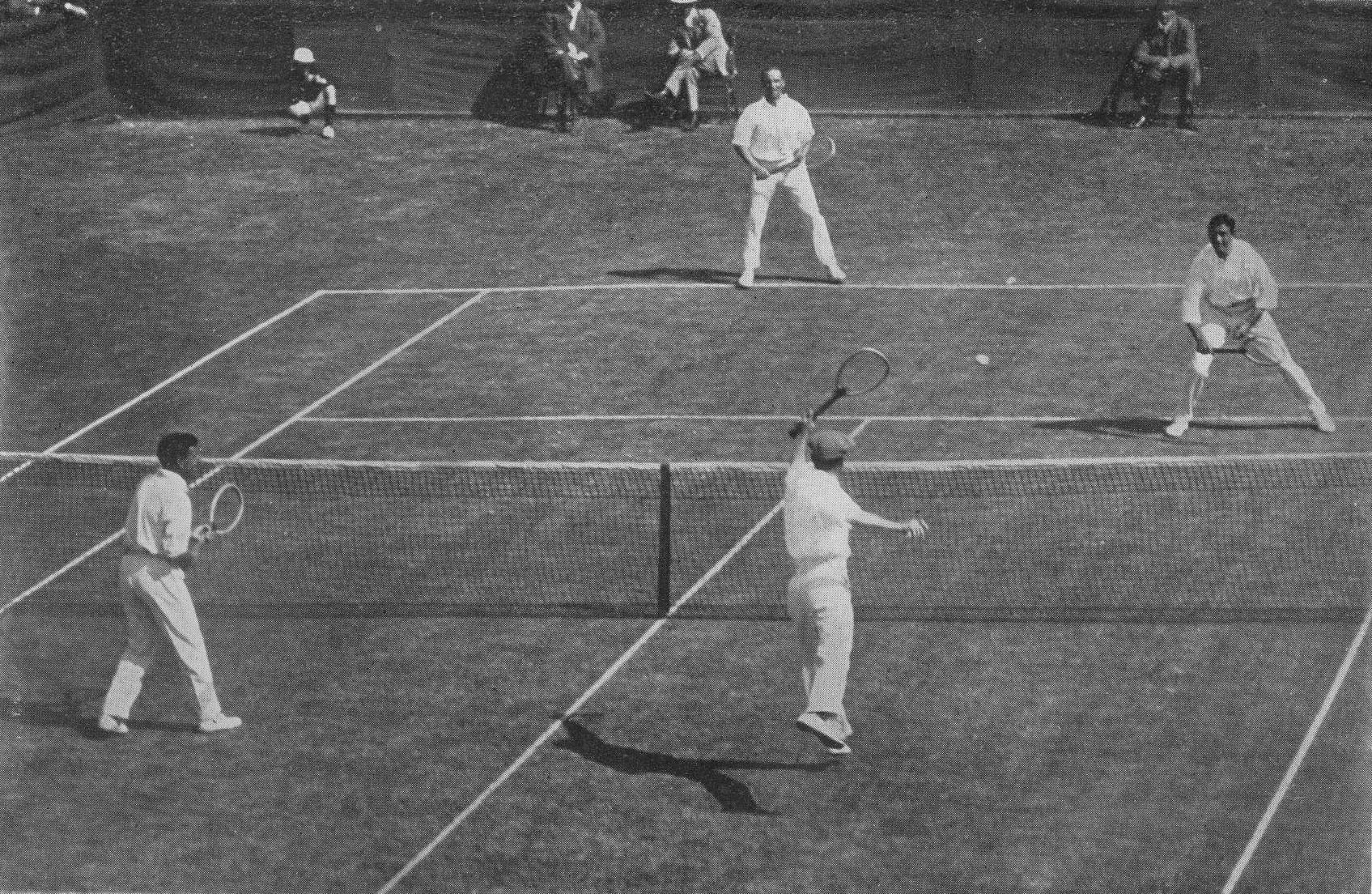
Doubles match between the Australasia and British isles in the 1912 International Lawn Tennis Challenge final.

The French won a further five successive tournaments before they were beaten 3–2 by Great Britain in 1933. Australia were the last winners before the onset of the Second World War. They beat the United States 3–2 in 1939. Upon resumption of the tournament in 1946, it was renamed the Davis Cup after the death of Dwight D. Davis in 1945. The United States regained the title after they beat Australia 5–0. They retained the title until 1950 when Australia won 4–1. This marked the start of Australian dominance of the Davis Cup, as they only lost three times from 1950 to 1967. Prior to 1972, the champion received a bye directly to the final.

The 1974 Davis Cup marked the first time that neither Australia or the United States won the final since 1936, as South Africa and India were the finalists. However, the Indian team refused to travel to South Africa in protest at the South African government's apartheid policies, meaning that the final was scratched and South Africa were awarded the Davis Cup. Sweden beat Czechoslovakia 3–2 the following year to become the first European nation since 1936 to win the Davis Cup.

The Davis Cup underwent further reorganisation in 1981 when a 16-team World Group was introduced. The remaining nations were split into regional groups with promotion and relegation to and from the World Group.

Sweden reached two more finals in 1988 and 1989, but lost both times to West Germany. The United States regained the title in 1990, but they lost 3–1 to France the following year. They regained the title a year later, but could not defend it in 1993 as Germany won. Sweden were victorious in 1994, and they won a further two Davis Cups in 1997 and 1998. Australia regained the Davis Cup in 1999, but they lost the following two finals to Spain and France respectively. Russia won their first Davis Cup in 2002, before Australia regained the title the following year. Spain won the tournament for the second time in 2004, and would win a further three titles in 2008, 2009 and 2011. The Czech Republic won successive Davis Cups in 2012 and 2013, before Switzerland won their first title in 2014. In 2015, Great Britain ended the longest drought in the competition's history, 73 years, when they won their first Davis Cup since 1936, beating Belgium 3–1.

== Finals ==
Key
*	Title won by away country
G	Grass
C	Clay
CP	Carpet
H	Hard
Ix	Indoor

- The "Year" column refers to the year the Davis Cup tournament was held, and wikilinks to the article about that tournament.
- Links in the "Winners" and "Runners-up" columns point to the articles for the national teams of the countries, not the articles for the countries.

Key
Inter-Zonal winner, Challenge round winner ‡
Defending champion, Challenge round winner †
Single round ◊

Davis Cup finals
Year	Winner	Score	Runner-up	Finals venue (surface)	Location
1900	United States ◊	3–0	British Isles	Longwood Cricket Club (G)	Boston, United States
1902	United States ◊	3–2	British Isles	Crescent Athletic Club (G)	New York City, United States
1903	British Isles ◊	4–1*	United States	Longwood Cricket Club (G)	Boston, United States
1904	British Isles †	5–0	Belgium	Worple Road (G)	London, United Kingdom
1905	British Isles †	5–0	United States	Queen's Club (G)	London, United Kingdom
1906	British Isles †	5–0	United States	Worple Road (G)	London, United Kingdom
1907	Australasia ‡	3–2*	British Isles	Worple Road (G)	London, United Kingdom
1908	Australasia †	3–2	United States	Albert Ground (G)	Melbourne, Australia
1909	Australasia †	5–0	United States	Double Bay Grounds (G)	Sydney, Australia
1911	Australasia †	4–0	United States	Lancaster Park (G)	Christchurch, New Zealand
1912	British Isles ‡	3–2*	Australasia	Albert Ground (G)	Melbourne, Australia
1913	United States ‡	3–2*	Great Britain	Worple Road (G)	London, United Kingdom
1914	Australasia ‡	3–2*	United States	West Side Tennis Club (G)	New York City, United States
1919	Australasia ‡	4–1	Great Britain	Double Bay Grounds (G)	Sydney, Australia
1920	United States ‡	5–0*	Australasia	Domain Cricket Club (G)	Auckland, New Zealand
1921	United States †	5–0	Japan	West Side Tennis Club (G)	New York City, United States
1922	United States †	4–1	Australasia	West Side Tennis Club (G)	New York City, United States
1923	United States †	4–1	Australia	West Side Tennis Club (G)	New York City, United States
1924	United States †	5–0	Australia	Germantown Cricket Club (G)	Philadelphia, United States
1925	United States †	5–0	France	Germantown Cricket Club (G)	Philadelphia, United States
1926	United States †	4–1	France	Germantown Cricket Club (G)	Philadelphia, United States
1927	France ‡	3–2*	United States	Germantown Cricket Club (G)	Philadelphia, United States
1928	France †	4–1	United States	Stade Roland Garros (C)	Paris, France
1929	France †	3–2	United States	Stade Roland Garros (C)	Paris, France
1930	France †	4–1	United States	Stade Roland Garros (C)	Paris, France
1931	France †	3–2	Great Britain	Stade Roland Garros (C)	Paris, France
1932	France †	3–2	United States	Stade Roland Garros (C)	Paris, France
1933	Great Britain ‡	3–2*	France	Stade Roland Garros (C)	Paris, France
1934	Great Britain †	4–1	United States	Centre Court, Wimbledon (G)	London, United Kingdom
1935	Great Britain †	5–0	United States	Centre Court, Wimbledon (G)	London, United Kingdom
1936	Great Britain †	3–2	Australia	Centre Court, Wimbledon (G)	London, United Kingdom
1937	United States ‡	4–1*	Great Britain	Centre Court, Wimbledon (G)	London, United Kingdom
1938	United States †	3–2	Australia	Germantown Cricket Club (G)	Philadelphia, United States
1939	Australia ‡	3–2*	United States	Merion Cricket Club (G)	Haverford, United States
1946	United States ‡	5–0*	Australia	Kooyong Stadium (G)	Melbourne, Australia
1947	United States †	4–1	Australia	West Side Tennis Club (G)	New York City, United States
1948	United States †	5–0	Australia	West Side Tennis Club (G)	New York City, United States
1949	United States †	4–1	Australia	West Side Tennis Club (G)	New York City, United States
1950	Australia ‡	4–1*	United States	West Side Tennis Club (G)	New York City, United States
1951	Australia †	3–2	United States	White City Stadium (G)	Sydney, Australia
1952	Australia †	4–1	United States	Memorial Drive Tennis Club (G)	Adelaide, Australia
1953	Australia †	3–2	United States	Kooyong Stadium (G)	Melbourne, Australia
1954	United States ‡	3–2*	Australia	White City Stadium (G)	Sydney, Australia
1955	Australia ‡	5–0*	United States	West Side Tennis Club (G)	New York City, United States
1956	Australia †	5–0	United States	Memorial Drive Tennis Club (G)	Adelaide, Australia
1957	Australia †	3–2	United States	Kooyong Stadium (G)	Melbourne, Australia
1958	United States ‡	3–2*	Australia	Milton Courts (G)	Brisbane, Australia
1959	Australia ‡	3–2*	United States	West Side Tennis Club (G)	New York City, United States
1960	Australia †	4–1	Italy	White City Stadium (G)	Sydney, Australia
1961	Australia †	5–0	Italy	Kooyong Stadium (G)	Melbourne, Australia
1962	Australia †	5–0	Mexico	Milton Courts (G)	Brisbane, Australia
1963	United States ‡	3–2*	Australia	Memorial Drive Tennis Club (G)	Adelaide, Australia
1964	Australia ‡	3–2*	United States	Harold Clark Courts (C)	Cleveland, United States
1965	Australia †	4–1	Spain	White City Stadium (G)	Sydney, Australia
1966	Australia †	4–1	India	Kooyong Stadium (G)	Melbourne, Australia
1967	Australia †	4–1	Spain	Milton Courts (G)	Brisbane, Australia
1968	United States ‡	4–1*	Australia	Memorial Drive Tennis Club (G)	Adelaide, Australia
1969	United States †	5–0	Romania	Harold Clark Courts (H)	Cleveland, United States
1970	United States †	5–0	West Germany	Harold Clark Courts (H)	Cleveland, United States
1971	United States †	3–2	Romania	Olde Providence Racquet Club (C)	Charlotte, United States
1972	United States	3–2*	Romania	Club Sportiv Progresul (C)	Bucharest, Romania
1973	Australia	5–0*	United States	Public Auditorium (ICp)	Cleveland, United States
1974	South Africa	w/o	India	—	—
1975	Sweden	3–2	Czechoslovakia	Kungliga tennishallen (ICp)	Stockholm, Sweden
1976	Italy	4–1*	Chile	Estadio Nacional (C)	Santiago, Chile
1977	Australia	3–1	Italy	White City Stadium (G)	Sydney, Australia
1978	United States	4–1	Great Britain	Mission Hills CC (H)	Rancho Mirage, United States
1979	United States	5–0	Italy	Civic Auditorium (ICp)	San Francisco, United States
1980	Czechoslovakia	4–1	Italy	Sportovní Hala (ICp)	Prague, Czechoslovakia
1981	United States	3–1	Argentina	Riverfront Coliseum (ICp)	Cincinnati, United States
1982	United States	4–1*	France	Palais des Sports (IC)	Grenoble, France
1983	Australia	3–2	Sweden	Kooyong Stadium (G)	Melbourne, Australia
1984	Sweden	4–1	United States	Scandinavium (IC)	Gothenburg, Sweden
1985	Sweden	3–2*	West Germany	Olympiahalle (ICp)	Munich, West Germany
1986	Australia	3–2	Sweden	Kooyong Stadium (G)	Melbourne, Australia
1987	Sweden	5–0	India	Scandinavium (IC)	Gothenburg, Sweden
1988	West Germany	4–1*	Sweden	Scandinavium (IC)	Gothenburg, Sweden
1989	West Germany	3–2	Sweden	Schleyerhalle (ICp)	Stuttgart, West Germany
1990	United States	3–2	Australia	Suncoast Dome (IC)	St. Petersburg, United States
1991	France	3–1	United States	Palais des Sports de Gerland (ICp)	Lyon, France
1992	United States	3–1	Switzerland	Tarrant County Center (IH)	Fort Worth, United States
1993	Germany	4–1	Australia	Messe Düsseldorf Exhibition Hall (IC)	Düsseldorf, Germany
1994	Sweden	4–1*	Russia	Olympic Stadium (ICp)	Moscow, Russia
1995	United States	3–2*	Russia	Olympic Stadium (IC)	Moscow, Russia
1996	France	3–2*	Sweden	Malmö Isstadion (IH)	Malmö, Sweden
1997	Sweden	5–0	United States	Scandinavium (ICp)	Gothenburg, Sweden
1998	Sweden	4–1*	Italy	Forum (IC)	Milan, Italy
1999	Australia	3–2*	France	Acropolis Exhibition Hall (IC)	Nice, France
2000	Spain	3–1	Australia	Palau Sant Jordi (IC)	Barcelona, Spain
2001	France	3–2*	Australia	Rod Laver Arena (G)	Melbourne, Australia
2002	Russia	3–2*	France	Palais Omnisports (IC)	Paris, France
2003	Australia	3–1	Spain	Rod Laver Arena (G)	Melbourne, Australia
2004	Spain	3–2	United States	Estadio de La Cartuja (IC)	Seville, Spain
2005	Croatia	3–2*	Slovakia	Sibamac Arena (IH)	Bratislava, Slovakia
2006	Russia	3–2	Argentina	Olympic Stadium (ICp)	Moscow, Russia
2007	United States	4–1	Russia	Memorial Coliseum (IH)	Portland, United States
2008	Spain	3–1*	Argentina	Polideportivo Islas Malvinas (IH)	Mar del Plata, Argentina
2009	Spain	5–0	Czech Republic	Palau Sant Jordi (IC)	Barcelona, Spain
2010	Serbia	3–2	France	Belgrade Arena (IH)	Belgrade, Serbia
2011	Spain	3–1	Argentina	Estadio de La Cartuja (IC)	Seville, Spain
2012	Czech Republic	3–2	Spain	O2 Arena (IH)	Prague, Czech Republic
2013	Czech Republic	3–2*	Serbia	Kombank Arena (IH)	Belgrade, Serbia
2014	Switzerland	3–1*	France	Stade Pierre-Mauroy (IC)	Lille, France
2015	Great Britain	3–1*	Belgium	Flanders Expo (IC)	Ghent, Belgium
2016	Argentina	3–2*	Croatia	Arena Zagreb (IH)	Zagreb, Croatia
2017	France	3–2	Belgium	Stade Pierre-Mauroy (IH)	Lille, France
2018	Croatia	3–1*	France	Stade Pierre-Mauroy (IC)	Lille, France
2019	Spain	2–0	Canada	Caja Mágica (IH)	Madrid, Spain
2020-21 (Note: The 2020 edition was originally scheduled to take place from 23 until 29 November 2020. However, on 26 June 2020, ITF announced that 2020 Finals would take place from 22 until 28 November 2021 due to coronavirus pandemic and be named 2021 Davis Cup Finals.)	(Russia) RTF (Note: The team from Russia was not permitted to use the Russian name, flag, or anthem in 2021; it won the Finals as the team of the Russian Tennis Federation (RTF), and used the flag of the RTF.)	2–0	Croatia	Madrid Arena (IH)	Madrid, Spain
2022	Canada	2–0	Australia	Martin Carpena Arena (IH)	Málaga, Spain
2023	Italy	2–0	Australia	Martin Carpena Arena (IH)	Málaga, Spain
2024	Italy	2–0	Netherlands	Martin Carpena Arena (IH)	Málaga, Spain
2025	Italy	2–0	Spain	SuperTennis Arena Bologna Fiere (IH)	Bologna, Italy

== Victories by team ==
=== All-time ===
Country	Titles	First	Last
United States	32	1900	2007
Australasia; Australia	28	1907	2003
British Isles; Great Britain	10	1903	2015
France	10	1927	2017
Sweden	7	1975	1998
Spain	6	2000	2019
Italy	4	1976	2025
Czechoslovakia; Czech Republic	3	1980	2013
West Germany; Germany	3	1988	1993
Russia; RTF	3	2002	2021
Croatia	2	2005	2018
South Africa	1	1974	
Serbia	1	2010	
Switzerland	1	2014	
Argentina	1	2016	
Canada	1	2022	

=== Since 1972 ===
Country	Titles	First	Last
United States	9	1972	2007
Sweden	7	1975	1998
Australia	6	1973	2003
Spain	6	2000	2019
France	4	1991	2017
Italy	4	1976	2025
Czechoslovakia; Czech Republic	3	1980	2013
West Germany; Germany	3	1988	1993
Russia; RTF	3	2002	2021
Croatia	2	2005	2018
South Africa	1	1974	
Serbia	1	2010	
Switzerland	1	2014	
Great Britain	1	2015	
Argentina	1	2016	
Canada	1	2022	

== Victories by continent ==
Continent	Wins
Europe	50
North America	33
Oceania	28
South America	1
Africa	1

== See also ==
- List of Billie Jean King Cup champions
- Hopman Cup finals by year
