= Australia Davis Cup team records and statistics =

National tennis team statistics

This article lists various records and statistics for the Australia Davis Cup team. Where possible, the page is updated after every Australian Davis Cup tie. This page is correct as of 30 August 2025.

== Player ==
=== Appearances ===
As of 30 August 2025

Most years played
| Rank | Player | Years |
|---|---|---|
| 1 | Lleyton Hewitt | 19 |
| 2 | Todd Woodbridge | 14 |
| 3 | John Alexander | 11 |
| 4 | Mark Woodforde | 10 |
| 4 | John Fitzgerald | 10 |
| 6 | Norman Brookes | 9 |
| 6 | Roy Emerson | 9 |
| 6 | Chris Guccione | 9 |
| 6 | Adrian Quist | 9 |
| 6 | Tony Roche | 9 |

Most ties played
| Rank | Player | Ties |
|---|---|---|
| 1 | Lleyton Hewitt | 43 |
| 2 | Todd Woodbridge | 32 |
| 3 | Adrian Quist | 28 |
| 4 | Mark Woodforde | 24 |
| 5 | John Bromwich | 23 |
| 5 | Jack Crawford | 23 |
| 5 | John Fitzgerald | 23 |
| 8 | John Alexander | 20 |
| 9 | Wayne Arthurs | 19 |
| 9 | Pat Cash | 19 |
| 9 | Mark Edmondson | 19 |

Most matches played
| Rank | Player | Rbrs |
|---|---|---|
| 1 | Lleyton Hewitt | 79 |
| 2 | Jack Crawford | 57 |
| 3 | Adrian Quist | 56 |
| 4 | John Bromwich | 51 |
| 5 | Gerald Patterson | 46 |
| 6 | John Alexander | 41 |
| 6 | Pat Cash | 41 |
| 6 | Todd Woodbridge | 41 |
| 9 | Norman Brookes | 39 |
| 10 | Roy Emerson | 38 |

Youngest Player
Vivian McGrath – 17 years, 84 days in 1933 Europe Second Round tie vs. Norway in Oslo, Norway on 12 May 1933

Oldest player
Norman Brookes – 43 years, 46 days in 1920 Challenge Round Final vs. United States at Domain Cricket Club, Auckland, New Zealand on 1 January 1921

=== Wins ===
Highest win percentage^{1}
| # | Player | % | W–L |
|---|---|---|---|
| 1 | Rex Hartwig | 92.3 | 12–1 |
| 2 | Roy Emerson | 89.5 | 34–4 |
| 3 | Frank Sedgman | 89.3 | 25–3 |
| 4 | Ken Rosewall | 86.4 | 19–3 |
| 5 | Neale Fraser | 85.7 | 18–3 |
| 6 | Rod Laver | 83.3 | 20–4 |
| 7 | Fred Stolle | 81.3 | 13–3 |
| 8 | Lew Hoad | 81 | 17–4 |
| 8 | Bernard Tomic | 81 | 17–4 |
| 10 | James Anderson | 77.8 | 28–8 |

Most rubbers won
| # | Player | Wins |
|---|---|---|
| 1 | Lleyton Hewitt | 59 |
| 2 | Adrian Quist | 43 |
| 3 | John Bromwich | 39 |
| 4 | Jack Crawford | 36 |
| 5 | Roy Emerson | 34 |
| 6 | Gerald Patterson | 32 |
| 7 | Pat Cash | 31 |
| 8 | Todd Woodbridge | 30 |
| 9 | Norman Brookes | 28 |
| 9 | James Anderson | 28 |

Most singles wins
| # | Player | Wins |
|---|---|---|
| 1 | Lleyton Hewitt | 42 |
| 2 | Adrian Quist | 24 |
| 3 | Pat Cash | 23 |
| 3 | Jack Crawford | 23 |
| 5 | Roy Emerson | 21 |
| 5 | Gerald Patterson | 21 |
| 7 | James Anderson | 20 |
| 8 | John Bromwich | 19 |
| 9 | Norman Brookes | 18 |
| 9 | Patrick Rafter | 18 |

Most doubles wins
| # | Player | Wins |
|---|---|---|
| 1 | Todd Woodbridge | 25 |
| 2 | John Bromwich | 20 |
| 3 | Adrian Quist | 19 |
| 4 | Lleyton Hewitt | 17 |
| 4 | Mark Woodforde | 17 |
| 6 | Jack Crawford | 13 |
| 6 | Roy Emerson | 13 |
| 8 | Gerald Patterson | 11 |
| 9 | John Alexander | 10 |
| 9 | Norman Brookes | 10 |

Notes

^{1} Minimum 10 rubbers played

== Miscellaneous ==
Longest tie-break
28 points (15–13) – Pat Rafter def. David Rikl in the first set of 1997 World Group Quarterfinals tie vs. Czech Republic at Memorial Drive, Adelaide, Australia on 6 April 1997
Longest final set
30 games (16–14) –

- Tony Wilding (ANZ) def. Arthur Lowe in 1914 Challenge Round Final tie vs. Great Britain at Longwood Cricket Club, Boston, USA on 6 August 1914
- Syd Ball def. Saeed Meer in 1974 Eastern Zone Semifinals tie vs. Pakistan in Rawalpindi, Pakistan on 3 May 1974

Longest match (duration)
4 hours, 30 minutes – Lleyton Hewitt lost to Kristof Vliegen in 2007 World Group First Round vs. Belgium at Country Hall du Sart-Tilman, Liege, Belgium on 9 February 2007
Longest tie (duration)
15 hours, 19 minutes – Australia lost to Belgium in 2007 World Group First Round tie vs. Belgium at Country Hall du Sart-Tilman, Liege, Belgium on 9–11 February 2007
Most games in a set
38 games (20–18) – Australia (Dibley/Roche) def. Pakistan (Meer/Rahim) (20–18, 6–4, 6–3) in 1974 Eastern Zone Semifinals tie vs. Pakistan in Rawalpindi, Pakistan on 4 May 1974
Most games in a match
99 games – Australia (Alexander/Dibley) lost to India (Amritraj/Amritraj) (15–17, 8–6, 3–6, 18–16, 4–6) in 1974 Eastern Zone Final tie vs. India in Calcutta, India on 11 May 1974
Most games in a tie
327 – Australia lost to India (2–3) in 1974 Eastern Zone Final tie vs. India in Calcutta, India on 10–12 May 1974
Most decisive victory (best of 3 rubbers)
5 sets (6–1)

- Australia def.Colombia (3–0) in 2019 Finals Group Stage (Group D) tie vs. Colombia at Caja Magica, Madrid, Spain on 19 November 2019
- Australia def. Belgium (3–0) in 2022 Finals Group Stage (Group C) tie vs. Belgium at Am Rothenbaum, Hamburg, Germany on 13 September 2022

Most decisive victory (best of 5 rubbers)
15 sets (15–0)

- Australia def. China (5–0) in 1924 America Zone Quarterfinals tie vs. China at the Crescent Athletic Club, Brooklyn, NY, USA on 31 July – 1 August 1924
- Australasia def. Canada (5–0) in 1914 Davis Cup Quarterfinals tie vs. Canada at Onwentsia, Lake Forest, IL, USA on 23–25 July 1914

Trebles
1999 Davis Cup, 1999 World Team Cup and 1999 Hopman Cup
Senior/Junior
1986 Davis Cup and 1986 Junior Davis Cup
Junior/Junior
2007 Junior Davis Cup & Bille Jean King Cup

=== Longest winning streak ===
| # | Round | Date | Venue | Opponent | Score | R |
|---|---|---|---|---|---|---|
| 1 | North America Zone, Semifinals | 18–20 Jul 1959 | CD Chapultepec, Mexico City, MEX | Mexico | 4–1 | |
| 2 | North America Zone, Final | 24–26 Jul 1959 | Mount Royal Tennis Club, Montreal, CAN | Canada | 5–0 | |
| 3 | Americas Zone, Final | 31 Jul–02 Aug 1959 | Mount Royal Tennis Club, Montreal, CAN | Cuba | 5–0 | |
| 4 | Inter-zonal Semifinals | 7–10 Aug 1959 | Germantown Cricket Club, Philadelphia, USA | Italy | 4–1 | |
| 5 | Inter-zonal Final | 14–16 Aug 1959 | Longwood Cricket Club, Boston, USA | India | 4–1 | |
| 6 | Challenge Round | 28–31 Aug 1959 | Westside Tennis Club, Houston, USA | United States | 3–2 | |
| 7 | Challenge Round | 26–28 Dec 1960 | White City Stadium, Sydney, AUS | Italy | 4–1 | |
| 8 | Challenge Round | 26–28 Dec 1961 | Kooyong Stadium, Melbourne, AUS | Italy | 5–0 | |
| 9 | Challenge Round | 26–28 Dec 1962 | Milton Courts, Brisbane, AUS | Mexico | 5–0 | |

== Davis Cup finals ==
=== Most consecutive finals appearances (all-time) ===
25 – From 1938 to 1968

(1938, 1939, 1946, 1947, 1948, 1949, 1950, 1951, 1952, 1953, 1954, 1955, 1956, 1957, 1958, 1959, 1960, 1961, 1962, 1963, 1964, 1965, 1966, 1967, 1968)

=== Most consecutive finals appearances (since 1981) ===
3 – From 1999 to 2001

| Year | Date | Venue | Opponent | Score | R |
|---|---|---|---|---|---|
| 1999 | 3–5 Dec | Acropolis Exhibition Hall, Nice, FRA | France | 3–2 | |
| 2000 | 8–10 Dec | Palau Sant Jordi, Barcelona, ESP | Spain | 1–3 | |
| 2001 | 30 Nov–2 Dec | Rod Laver Arena, Melbourne, AUS | France | 2–3 | |

=== Most consecutive titles won ===
4 – on four separate occasions (1907 to 1911, 1950 to 1953, 1959 to 1962 and 1964 to 1967)

=== Most consecutive titles won by a player ===
8 – Roy Emerson – 1959, 1960, 1961, 1962, 1963, 1964, 1965, 1966, and 1967

=== Most consecutive titles won by a captain ===
16 – Harry Hopman – 1939, 1950, 1951, 1952, 1953, 1955, 1956, 1957, 1959, 1960, 1961, 1962, 1964, 1965, 1966 and 1967

=== All Davis Cup final appearances ===
28 titles, 20 runners-up

| Result | Year | Date | Venue | Surface | Opponent | Score |
|---|---|---|---|---|---|---|
| Win | 1907 | 20–24 Jul | Worple Road, Wimbledon, London, GBR | Grass | British Isles | 3–2 |
| Win | 1908 | 27–30 Nov | Albert Ground, Melbourne, AUS | Grass | United States | 3–2 |
| Win | 1909 | 27–30 Nov | Double Bay Grounds, Sydney, AUS | Grass | United States | 4–0 |
| Win | 1911 | 1–3 Jan (1912) | Lancaster Park, Christchurch, NZL | Grass | United States | 5–0 |
| Loss | 1912 | 28–30 Nov | Albert Ground, Melbourne, AUS | Grass | British Isles | 2–3 |
| Win | 1914 | 13–15 Aug | West Side Tennis Club, Forest Hills, NY, USA | Grass | United States | 3–2 |
| Win | 1919 | 16–21 Jan 1920 | Double Bay Grounds, Sydney, AUS | Grass | Great Britain | 4–1 |
| Loss | 1920 | 30 Dec–1 Jan | Domain Cricket Club, Auckland, NZL | Grass | United States | 0–5 |
| Loss | 1922 | 1–5 Sep | West Side Tennis Club, Forest Hills, NY, USA | Grass | United States | 1–4 |
| Loss | 1923 | 31 Aug–3 Sep | West Side Tennis Club, Forest Hills, NY, USA | Grass | United States | 1–4 |
| Loss | 1924 | 11–13 Sep | Germantown Cricket Club, Philadelphia, USA | Grass | United States | 0–5 |
| Loss | 1936 | 25–28 Jul | All England Club, Wimbledon, London, GBR | Grass | Great Britain | 2–3 |
| Loss | 1938 | 3–5 Sep | Germantown Cricket Club, Philadelphia, USA | Grass | United States | 2–3 |
| Win | 1939 | 2–5 Sep | Merion Cricket Club, Haverford, PA, USA | Grass | United States | 3–2 |
| Loss | 1946 | 26–30 Dec | Kooyong Stadium, Melbourne, AUS | Grass | United States | 0–5 |
| Loss | 1947 | 30 Aug–1 Sep | West Side Tennis Club, Forest Hills, NY, USA | Grass | United States | 1–4 |
| Loss | 1948 | 4–6 Sep | West Side Tennis Club, Forest Hills, NY, USA | Grass | United States | 0–5 |
| Loss | 1949 | 26–28 Aug | West Side Tennis Club, Forest Hills, NY, USA | Grass | United States | 1–4 |
| Win | 1950 | 25–27 Aug | West Side Tennis Club, Forest Hills, NY, USA | Grass | United States | 4–1 |
| Win | 1951 | 26–28 Dec | White City Stadium, Sydney, AUS | Grass | United States | 3–2 |
| Win | 1952 | 29–31 Dec | Memorial Drive Park, Adelaide, AUS | Grass | United States | 4–1 |
| Win | 1953 | 28–31 Dec | Kooyong Stadium, Melbourne, AUS | Grass | United States | 3–2 |
| Loss | 1954 | 27–29 Dec | White City Stadium, Sydney, AUS | Grass | United States | 2–3 |
| Win | 1955 | 26–28 Aug | West Side Tennis Club, Forest Hills, NY, USA | Grass | United States | 5–0 |
| Win | 1956 | 26–28 Dec | Memorial Drive Park, Adelaide, AUS | Grass | United States | 5–0 |
| Win | 1957 | 26–28 Dec | Kooyong Stadium, Melbourne, AUS | Grass | United States | 3–2 |
| Loss | 1958 | 29–31 Dec | Milton Courts, Brisbane, AUS | Grass | United States | 2–3 |
| Win | 1959 | 28–31 Aug | West Side Tennis Club, Forest Hills, NY, USA | Grass | United States | 3–2 |
| Win | 1960 | 26–28 Dec | White City Stadium, Sydney, AUS | Grass | Italy | 4–1 |
| Win | 1961 | 26–28 Dec | Kooyong Stadium, Melbourne, AUS | Grass | Italy | 5–0 |
| Win | 1962 | 26–28 Dec | Milton Courts, Brisbane, AUS | Grass | Mexico | 5–0 |
| Loss | 1963 | 26–28 Dec | Memorial Drive Park, Adelaide, AUS | Grass | United States | 2–3 |
| Win | 1964 | 25–28 Sep | Harold Clark Courts, Cleveland, USA | Clay | United States | 3–2 |
| Win | 1965 | 27–29 Dec | White City Stadium, Sydney, AUS | Grass | Spain | 4–1 |
| Win | 1966 | 26–28 Dec | Kooyong Stadium, Melbourne, AUS | Grass | India | 4–1 |
| Win | 1967 | 26–28 Dec | Milton Courts, Brisbane, AUS | Grass | Spain | 4–1 |
| Loss | 1968 | 26–28 Dec | Memorial Drive Park, Adelaide, AUS | Grass | United States | 1–4 |
| Win | 1973 | 30 Nov–2 Dec | Public Auditorium, Cleveland, USA | Carpet (i) | United States | 5–0 |
| Win | 1977 | 2–4 Dec | White City Stadium, Sydney, AUS | Grass | Italy | 3–1 |
| Win | 1983 | 26–28 Dec | Kooyong Stadium, Melbourne, AUS | Grass | Sweden | 3–2 |
| Win | 1986 | 26–28 Dec | Kooyong Stadium, Melbourne, AUS | Grass | Sweden | 3–2 |
| Loss | 1990 | 30 Nov–2 Dec | Florida Suncoast Dome, St Petersburg, FL, USA | Clay (i) | United States | 2–3 |
| Loss | 1993 | 5–7 Dec | Messe Düsseldorf Exhibition Hall, Düsseldorf, GER | Clay (i) | Germany | 1–4 |
| Win | 1999 | 3–5 Dec | Acropolis Exhibition Hall, Nice, FRA | Clay | France | 3–2 |
| Loss | 2000 | 8–10 Dec | Palau Sant Jordi, Barcelona, ESP | Clay | Spain | 1–3 |
| Loss | 2001 | 30 Nov–2 Dec | Rod Laver Arena, Melbourne, AUS | Grass | France | 2–3 |
| Win | 2003 | 30 Nov–2 Dec | Rod Laver Arena, Melbourne, AUS | Grass | Spain | 3–1 |
| Loss | 2022 | 27 Nov | Martin Carpena Arena, Málaga, ESP | Hard (i) | Canada | 0–2 |
| Loss | 2023 | 26 Nov | Martin Carpena Arena, Málaga, ESP | Hard (i) | Italy | 0–2 |
