= Australia Davis Cup team =

National tennis team

Australia
- Association: Tennis Australia
- Captain: Lleyton Hewitt
- Coach: Josh Eagle
- Nations Ranking: 9 ▼ (21 September 2026)
- Colors: Green & Gold
- First year: 1923 (1905 as Australasia)
- Years played: 102
- Ties played (W–L): 287 (206–81)
- Years in World Group: 38 (68–37)
- Davis Cup titles: 28 (1907, 1908, 1909, 1911, 1914, 1919, 1939, 1950, 1951, 1952, 1953, 1955, 1956, 1957, 1959, 1960, 1961, 1962, 1964, 1965, 1966, 1967, 1973, 1977, 1983, 1986, 1999, 2003)
- Runners-up: 21 (1912, 1920, 1922, 1923, 1924, 1936, 1938, 1946, 1947, 1948, 1949, 1954, 1958, 1963, 1968, 1990, 1993, 2000, 2001, 2022, 2023)
- Most total wins: Lleyton Hewitt (59–21)
- Most singles wins: Lleyton Hewitt (42–14)
- Most doubles wins: Todd Woodbridge (25–7)
- Best doubles team: Mark Woodforde / Todd Woodbridge (14–2)
- Most ties played: Lleyton Hewitt (43)
- Most years played: Lleyton Hewitt (19)
- Last updated on: 2 November 2026.

The Australia Davis Cup team is the second most successful team ever to compete in the Davis Cup, winning the coveted title on 28 separate occasions, second behind the United States with 32.

Australia also participated in winning the Davis Cup six times with New Zealand under the alias Australasia (1905–1922).

== History ==
=== Australasia: 1905–1922 ===
While Australia and New Zealand have been two separate countries, the two countries did compete together under the alias Australasia in a number of sports, including Davis Cup in the first couple of decades of the 20th century.

Australian players began playing Davis Cup tennis in 1905 as a part of the Australasia Davis Cup team, which allowed players from New Zealand to compete on the same team. Despite players from New Zealand being eligible to represent Australasia, Anthony Wilding was the only New Zealander to play for the team while it existed.

During this period, the team won the Davis Cup on six occasions in 1907, 1908, 1909, 1911, 1914 and 1919.

In 1920, Australasia lost in the challenge round to the United States Davis Cup team 0–5 at home in Auckland. The team then reached the final in 1921 before again making the challenge round in 1922. The team lost 1–4 against the United States, away in New York City. This was the last ever tournament under the Australasia moniker before the nations began competing as separate entities.

=== The fledgling years: 1923–1937 ===
In the first tournament as the stand-alone Australia team, the side reached the challenge round, again losing 1–4 to the United States in New York City. The following year, Australia beat Japan 5–0 in the America Zone to qualify for the Inter-zonal final, where they defeated France 3–2 to set up another Challenge round rematch against the US for the third consecutive year. Unfortunately it wasn't meant to be for Australia, this time losing 0–5 in Philadelphia. France were able to enact revenge in 1925 when they defeated Australia 3–1 in the inter-zonal final.

The following few years would prove to be a lean spell for Australia, as they were either absent from the competition or were knocked out in the early rounds until they returned to form in 1933. Beginning the tournament from the second round of the Europe Zone, they won three ties before losing to eventual champions, Great Britain in the Europe Zone final. They went one round further in 1934, losing 2–3 to the United States in the inter-zonal final. In 1936, Australia won three ties to set up a Challenge round Final against Great Britain. Great Britain made use of the home ground advantage, winning 3–2 at the All England club in Wimbledon, London. 1937 would see Australia lose 0–5 in the America Zone final to eventual champions, United States. However this would spark a period of significant dominance for Australia.

=== Dominance ===
From 1937 to 1973, the only teams to win the Davis Cup were Australia and the U.S., in which 31 times were between one another. Australia won the Davis Cup title 17 times in 1939, 1950, 1951, 1952, 1953, 1955, 1956, 1957, 1959, 1960, 1961, 1962, 1964, 1965, 1966, 1967, and 1973.

Between 1938 and 1968, Australia participated in the challenge round for a consecutive 25 years, winning 16 titles and losing 9 times. This streak included earning the record for most consecutive titles with four. This accomplishment was achieved on three separate occasions, in 1950 to 1953, 1959 to 1962 and 1964 to 1967. Australia also recorded three consecutive titles between 1955 and 1957.

The only decades that Australia didn't win the Davis Cup was in the 1920s, 1940s and 2010s. Australia was runner up eight times during the 1920s and 1940s.

After the 1973 victory, Australia won the title another five times: 1977, 1983, 1986, 1999 and 2003. From 1999 to 2003, Australia reached the final round four times and won in 1999 and 2003.

=== 2000 to 2009 ===
In 2003, Lleyton Hewitt came back from two sets to love down against Roger Federer of Switzerland to win in five sets in the fourth rubber to clinch a Davis Cup final berth. In the final, Australia defeated Spain 3–1 in Melbourne Park in which Mark Philippoussis, with a torn pectoral muscle, defeated Juan Carlos Ferrero in five sets.

After Australia's 2003 win over Spain, Australia lost in the 2004 Davis Cup; Sweden beat Australia 4–1. Australia then had to play a world group qualifying match against Morocco, which it won 4–1. Australia solidified its spot in the 2005 Davis Cup world group and breezed through its first round against Austria 5–0. Argentina beat Australia in the next round.

In 2006, Australia managed to defeat Switzerland 3–2 in the fifth rubber in the first round. Australia then beat Belarus statement a 5–0 victory. Australia suffered a 5–0 loss to Argentina in the semifinals.

In the 2007 Davis Cup, Australia lost its first tie against Belgium, putting Australia in the world group playoffs. Australia drew Serbia in Serbia for a world group playoff, and Serbia won 4–1 overall.

The 2008 Davis Cup saw Australia beat Chinese Taipei 4–1 and Thailand 5–0. Australia then advanced to the world group playoffs, where it lost to Chile 3–2.

In the 2009 Davis Cup, Australia beat Thailand 3–2, and the team was drawn to against India in Chennai. Australia refused to play the tie in India for security concerns, so India advanced to the world group playoffs via forfeit.

=== 2010's ===
In the 2010 Davis Cup, Australia easily advanced through the Asia/Oceania playoffs with 5–0 defeats of Chinese Taipei and Japan. Australia then played a home tie against Belgium, losing 3–2.

For the fourth year in a row, Australia started its 2011 Davis Cup campaign in the Asia/Oceania playoffs. Australia then advanced to the 2011 Davis Cup World Group play-offs, where it received a home tie against seeded Switzerland. Played on grass at the Royal Sydney Golf Club in Sydney, Australia, Australia lost to Switzerland 3–2.

Australia began its 2012 Davis Cup again in the Asia/Oceania playoffs. Australia easily beat for China in the first round with a 5–0 victory and South Korea in the semifinals with a 5–0 win. Australia faced Germany in Hamburg, losing the tie 3–2.

== Rivalries ==
=== Australia and the United States ===
Having both teams dominate the competition for 36 years, Australia and the United States have had an intense rivalry in Davis Cup. They have played each other in the Davis Cup final on 29 separate occasions, with Australia leading the head-to-head 15–14. The first Davis Cup final meeting was in 1908 in which Australia triumphed 3–2. In fact, Australia won the first three Davis Cup final ties between the two, in the aforementioned 1908, 1909 and 1911. The final Davis Cup meeting between the pair was in 1990, in which the U.S. won 3–1.

In recent years, the rivalry has waned, while the two teams had not played each other from 1999 to 2016, when Australia hosted the U.S. in Round 1 of the 2016 Cup. The two teams last met in the quarterfinal of the 2024 Davis Cup, which extended their total meetings to 48. As of the completion of the 2024 meeting, the ledger stands at 26–22 in favour of the U.S.

== Results and fixtures ==
The following are lists of match results and scheduled matches for the previous year and any upcoming ties.

Win Loss Fixture

=== 2025 ===
Qualifiers
First round

Sweden
1
Kungliga Tennishallen, Stockholm, Sweden
31 January–1 February 2025
Hard (indoors)

Australia
3

			1	2	3
1	(Sweden) (Australia)	Mikael Ymer; Alex de Minaur	5; 7	1; 6
2	(Sweden) (Australia)	Leo Borg; Aleksandar Vukic	4; 6	4; 6
3	(Sweden) (Australia)	Filip Bergevi / André Göransson; Matthew Ebden / John Peers	7^{9} 6^{7}	3; 6	2; 6
4	(Sweden) (Australia)	Leo Borg; John Peers	7; 5	6; 4
5	(Sweden) (Australia)	Mikael Ymer; Aleksandar Vukic				not played

Qualifiers
Second round

Australia
2
Ken Rosewall Arena, Sydney, Australia
13–14 September 2025
Hard

Belgium
3

			1	2	3
1	(Australia) (Belgium)	Alex de Minaur; Raphaël Collignon	5; 7	6; 3	3; 6
2	(Australia) (Belgium)	Jordan Thompson; Zizou Bergs	6^{4} 7^{7}	4; 6
3	(Australia) (Belgium)	Jordan Thompson / Rinky Hijikata; Sander Gillé / Joran Vliegen	6^{7} 7^{9}	6; 3	6; 4
4	(Australia) (Belgium)	Alex de Minaur; Zizou Bergs	6; 2	7; 5
5	(Australia) (Belgium)	Aleksandar Vukic; Raphaël Collignon	7^{7} 6^{5}	2; 6	3; 6

=== 2026 ===
Qualifiers
First round

Ecuador
3
Quito Tennis and Golf Club, Quito, Ecuador
7–8 February 2026
Clay

Australia
1

			1	2	3
1	(Ecuador) (Australia)	Álvaro Guillén Meza; Rinky Hijikata	6; 4	1; 6	6; 4
2	(Ecuador) (Australia)	Andrés Andrade; James Duckworth	3; 6	6; 3	7; 5
3	(Ecuador) (Australia)	Gonzalo Escobar / Diego Hidalgo; Rinky Hijikata / Jordan Thompson	7^{7} 6^{5}	6; 4
4	(Ecuador) (Australia)	Emilio Camacho; Jason Kubler	4; 6	2; 6
5	(Ecuador) (Australia)	Andrés Andrade; Rinky Hijikata				not played

World Group I

Australia
3
Pat Rafter Arena, Brisbane, Australia
19–20 September 2026
Hard

Poland
1

			1	2	3
1	(Australia) (Poland)	Alex de Minaur; Maks Kaśnikowski	6; 3	6; 0
2	(Australia) (Poland)	James Duckworth; Kamil Majchrzak	6; 2	3; 6	3; 6
3	(Australia) (Poland)	Rinky Hijikata / Max Purcell; Karol Drzewiecki / Jan Zieliński	7^{7} 6^{3}	6; 3
4	(Australia) (Poland)	Alex de Minaur; Kamil Majchrzak	6; 3	6; 3
5	(Australia) (Poland)	James Duckworth; Maks Kaśnikowski				not played

== Players ==
=== Current team ===
The following players were selected for the 2026 Davis Cup World Group I held in Brisbane, Australia.
Player information and rankings as of 14 September 2026 prior to the round.

Team nominations against Poland in 2026.
Player	Born	ATP ranking		Debut	Nom	Ties	Win-loss			ATP Profile
Player	Born	Singles	Doubles	Debut	Nom	Ties	Singles	Doubles	Total	ATP Profile
Alex de Minaur	17 February 1999 (age 27)	9	337	2018	12	23	16–9	0–1	16–9	
James Duckworth	21 January 1992 (age 34)	67	893	2021				–		
Rinky Hijikata	23 February 2001 (age 25)	85	184	2025				–		
Adam Walton	17 April 1999 (age 27)	102	685	2026				–		
Max Purcell	3 April 1998 (age 28)	671	624	2022	5	11	0–2	9–2	9–4	
Non-playing captain: Lleyton Hewitt

== Captains ==
There have been 19 Davis Cup captains since Australia's first participation in the event in 1905 (as Australasia).

Name	Tenure	Total	Finals				Best Result (Note: Best result if failed to make Davis Cup Final)	
Name	Tenure	Total	W	Years	F	Years	S	Years
Norman Brookes	1905–1914, 1919–1920, 1935	12	6	1907, 1908, 1909, 1911, 1914, 1919	2	1912, 1920	n/a	
Norman Peach	1921	1			1	1921	n/a	
James Anderson	1922–1923	2			2	1922, 1923	n/a	
Gerald Patterson	1924, 1928, 1946	3			2	1924, 1946	n/a	
John Hawkes	1925	1					3rd	1925
James Willard	1930	1					4R	1930
Jack Clemenger	1932	1					3R	1932
Stanley Youdale	1933–1934	2					3rd	1934
Cliff Sproule	1936–1937	2			1	1936	n/a	
Harry Hopman	1938–1939, 1950–1969	22	16	1939, 1950, 1951, 1952, 1953, 1955, 1956, 1957, 1959, 1960, 1961, 1962, 1964, 1965, 1966, 1967	5	1938, 1954, 1958, 1963, 1968	n/a	
Roy Cowling	1947	1			1	1947	n/a	
Adrian Quist	1948	1			1	1948	n/a	
John Bromwich	1949	1			1	1949	n/a	
Neale Fraser	1970–1994	25	4	1973, 1977, 1983, 1986	2	1990, 1993	n/a	
John Newcombe	1995–2000	6	1	1999	1	2000	n/a	
John Fitzgerald	2001–2010	10	1	2003	1	2001	n/a	
Pat Rafter	2011–2014	4					1R	2014
Wally Masur	2015	1					SF	2015
Lleyton Hewitt	2016–	9			2	2022, 2023	n/a	

Notes

- No Davis Cup was held between 1915–1918 and 1940–1945 due to World Wars. No Davis Cup was held in 2020 due to the COVID-19 pandemic
- Australia did not enter a team in 1926, 1927, 1929 or 1931 Davis Cup editions.

== Records ==
Lleyton Hewitt holds the record for most number of years participated (19), most ties played (43) and most matches played (79). He also holds the record for most rubbers won (59) and most singles matches won (42). Rex Hartwig holds the record for highest win percentage (92.3% from 13 matches) and Todd Woodbridge has won the most doubles matches (25).

Vivian McGrath is the youngest player to have competed in the Davis Cup at 17 years and 84 days, while Norman Brookes is the oldest player at 43 years and 46 days.

The records for longest tie (15 hours and 19 minutes) and match (4 hours and 30 minutes) were set in the 2007 First Round tie in Belgium and the most games in a match (99) and most games in a tie (327) were set in the 1974 Eastern Zone Final against India.

Australia's longest winning streak is set at 9 ties from 18 July 1959 to 28 December 1962.

Australia appeared in 25 consecutive Davis Cup Challenge Rounds from 1938 to 1968 and 3 consecutive Davis Cup Finals from 1999 to 2001. They have also won the title for four consecutive times on four separate occasions.

Roy Emerson holds the record for most consecutive tiles won by a player, with 8 consecutive titles. Harry Hopman holds the record for most consecutive tiles won by a captain, with 16 consecutive titles.

All told, Australia has won 28 Davis Cup titles and have been runners-up on 20 occasions.

== Performance timeline ==
Key
W	F	SF	QF	#R	RR	Z#	PO	A	NH

Until 1971: (W) Challenge round winner; (F) Challenge round finalist; (SF) inter-zonal finalist; (QF) zonal finalist; (#R) rounds 4, 3, 2, 1; (A) absent; (NH) not held.
From 1972: (W) winner; (F) finalist; (SF) semifinalist; (QF) quarterfinalist or zonal finalist; (#R) rounds 4, 3, 2, 1 or (1R*) lost in World Group playoff; (RR) round-robin stage; (Z#) Davis Cup Zonal Group (with round), (PO) lost in World Group play-off or (PO*) won in World Group playoff; (A) absent; (NH) not held.
To avoid confusion and double counting, these charts are updated at the conclusion of a tournament or when the team's participation has ended.

Year	1900	1901	1902	1903	1904	1905	1906	1907	1908	1909	1910	1911	1912	1913	1914	1915	1916	1917	1918	1919
Result	A	NH	A	A	A	SF	SF	W	W	W	NH	W	F	1R	W	Not Held				W
W–L	—	—	—	—	—	1–1	1–1	2–0	1–0	1–0	—	1–0	0–1	0–1	4–0	—				1–0
Year	1920	1921	1922	1923	1924	1925	1926	1927	1928	1929	1930	1931	1932	1933	1934	1935	1936	1937	1938	1939
Result	F	SF	F	F	F	SF	A	A	1R	A	4R	A	3R	QF	SF	3R	F	QF	F	W
W–L	0–1	3–1	4–1	2–1	4–1	3–1	—	—	0–1	—	3–1	—	1–1	3–1	3–1	2–1	3–1	1–1	3–1	6–0
Year	1940	1941	1942	1943	1944	1945	1946	1947	1948	1949	1950	1951	1952	1953	1954	1955	1956	1957	1958	1959
Result	Not Held						F	F	F	F	W	W	W	W	F	W	W	W	F	W
W–L	—						0–1	2–1	3–1	3–1	4–0	1–0	1–0	1–0	0–1	6–0	1–0	1–0	0–1	6–0
Year	1960	1961	1962	1963	1964	1965	1966	1967	1968	1969	1970	1971	1972	1973	1974	1975	1976	1977	1978	1979
Result	W	W	W	F	W	W	W	W	F	3R	4R	3R	SF	W	QF	SF	SF	W	SF	SF
W–L	1–0	1–0	1–0	0–1	5–0	1–0	1–0	1–0	0–1	0–1	3–1	2–1	3–1	4–0	1–1	2–1	2–1	4–0	2–1	2–1
Year	1980	1981	1982	1983	1984	1985	1986	1987	1988	1989	1990	1991	1992	1993	1994	1995	1996	1997	1998	1999
Result	SF	SF	SF	W	SF	SF	W	SF	QF	1R	F	QF	QF	F	1R	1R*	PO*	SF	1R	W
W–L	2–1	2–1	2–1	4–0	2–1	2–1	4–0	2–1	1–1	1–1	3–1	1–1	1–1	3–1	1–1	0–2	3–0	2–1	1–1	4–0
Year	2000	2001	2002	2003	2004	2005	2006	2007	2008	2009	2010	2011	2012	2013	2014	2015	2016	2017	2018	2019
Result	F	F	1R	W	1R	QF	SF	1R*	PO	Z2	PO	PO	PO	PO*	1R	SF	1R	SF	1R	QF
W–L	3–1	3–1	1–1	4–0	1–1	1–1	2–1	0–2	2–1	1–1	2–1	1–1	2–1	3–0	1–1	2–1	1–1	2–1	0–2	3–1
Year	2020–21		2022	2023	2024	2025														
Result	RR		F	F	SF	2R														
W–L	2–1		5–2	4–2	3–2	1–1														

== Record ==
=== Home and away record (since 1981; all 102 match-ups) ===
As of 18 September 2016

- Performance at home (50 match-ups): 41–9 (82.2%)
- Performance away (52 match-ups): 29–23 (55.5%)
- Total: 69–31 (68.8%)

=== Head-to-head record ===
As of 7 December 2022

All time head-to-head
Nation	Ties^{1}	W–L	%	Court Surface / Type							Venue			World Grp/ Finals	Ref
Nation	Ties^{1}	W–L	%	Cl	H	G	Cp	U	I	O	H	A	N	World Grp/ Finals	Ref
Argentina	5	2–3	40%	1–2	—	1–1	—	—	—	2–3	1–1	1–2	—	1–3	
Austria^{1}	4	2–2	50%	0–2	—	2–0	—	—	0–1	2–1	1–0	0–2	1–0	1–2	
Belarus	1	1–0	100%	—	1–0	—	—	—	—	1–0	1–0	—	—	1–0	
Belgium	7	4–3	57%	0–2	2–1	2–0	—	—	2–2	2–1	1–1	0–2	3–0	3–3	
Bosnia and Herzegovina	1	1–0	100%	—	1–0	—	—	—	—	1–0	1–0	—	—	1–0	
Brazil^{1}	4	4–0	100%	1–0	—	2–0	—	1–0	—	3–0	2–0	1–0	1–0	3–0	
Canada	11	9–2	82%	2–0	0–2	7–0	—	—	0–2	9–0	—	8–0	1–2	0–2	
Chile	3	2–1	66%	0–1	1–0	1–0	—	—	—	2–1	1–0	0–1	1–0	1–1	
China	3	3–0	100%	—	1–0	2–0	—	—	1–0	2–0	1–0	1–0	1–0	2–0	
Chinese Taipei	4	4–0	100%	—	4–0	—	—	—	1–0	3–0	2–0	2–0	—	4–0	
Colombia	1	1–0	100%	—	1–0	—	—	—	1–0	—	—	—	1–0	1–0	
Croatia^{2}	3	2–1	67%	1–0	1–1	—	—	—	1–1	1–0	—	1–0	1–1	2–1	
Cuba^{1}	4	4–0	100%	—	—	2–0	—	2–0	—	2–0	—	2–0	2–0	—	
Czech Republic^{3}	9	8–1	89%	2–1	2–0	4–0	—	—	1–0	7–1	3–0	2–1	3–0	3–0	
Denmark	1	1–0	100%	—	—	1–0	—	—	—	1–0	—	—	1–0	—	
Ecuador	1	1–0	100%	—	—	1–0	—	—	—	1–0	1–0	—	—	1–0	
France	16	11–5	69%	3–3	1–0	6–2	1–0	—	3–2	8–3	3–1	4–3	4–1	6–4	
Germany^{4}	9	4–5	44%	0–3	0–2	4–0	—	—	0–2	4–3	1–1	0–4	3–0	1–4	
Great Britain^{5}	13	8–5	62%	1–0	0–1	7–3	0–1	—	0–2	8–3	3–1	3–4	2–0	3–1	
Hawaii^{1}	1	1–0	100%	—	—	1–0	—	—	—	1–0	—	—	1–0	—	
Hong Kong	1	1–0	100%	—	—	—	—	1–0	—	—	—	1–0	—	—	
Hungary^{6}	3	2–1	66%	0–1	2–0	—	—	—	1–0	1–1	1–0	0–1	1–0	2–1	
India^{1}	11	8–3	73%	1–0	1–0	4–1	—	2–2	—	6–1	3–1	4–2	1–0	2–1	
Indonesia	2	2–0	100%	—	—	1–0	—	1–0	—	1–0	1–0	1–0	—	—	
Italy	12	8–4	67%	1–4	—	7–0	—	—	—	8–4	4–0	1–4	3–0	2–0	
Japan	17	15–2	88%	3–0	1–0	7–1	1–0	3–1	—	12–1	3–0	5–1	7–1	2–0	
Kazakhstan	1	1–0	100%	—	—	1–0	—	—	—	1–0	1–0	—	—	1–0	
Mexico	15	14–1	93%	10–1	—	4–0	—	—	—	14–1	2–0	8–1	4–0	3–0	
Morocco	1	1–0	100%	—	—	1–0	—	—	—	1–0	1–0	—	—	1–0	
Netherlands	1	1–0	100%	—	1–0	—	—	—	1–0	—	—	—	1–0	1–0	
New Zealand	10	10–0	100%	—	1–0	8–0	1–0	—	1–0	9–0	4–0	5–0	1–0	3–0	
Norway	1	1–0	100%	1–0	—	—	—	—	—	1–0	—	1–0	—	—	
Pakistan	1	1–0	100%	—	—	—	—	1–0	—	—	—	1–0	—	—	
Paraguay	1	1–0	100%	—	—	1–0	—	—	—	1–0	1–0	—	—	1–0	
Peru	1	1–0	100%	1–0	—	—	—	—	—	1–0	—	1–0	—	1–0	
Philippines	2	2–0	100%	—	—	1–0	—	1–0	—	1–0	—	1–0	1–0	—	
Poland	1	1–0	100%	1–0	—	—	—	—	1–0	—	—	1–0	—	1–0	
Romania	2	1–1	50%	0–1	—	1–0	—	—	—	1–1	1–0	0–1	—	1–0	
Russia	2	1–1	50%	—	—	1–0	0–1	—	0–1	1–0	1–0	0–1	—	1–1	
Serbia^{7}	6	5–1	83%	1–1	—	3–0	1–0	—	2–1	3–0	2–0	1–1	2–0	4–1	
Slovakia	1	1–0	100%	—	—	1–0	—	—	—	1–0	1–0	—	—	1–0	
South Africa	2	1–1	50%	—	0–1	1–0	—	—	—	1–1	—	0–1	1–0	1–0	
South Korea^{1}	2	2–0	100%	1–0	—	—	—	1–0	—	1–0	1–0	1–0	—	1–0	
Spain	5	4–1	80%	0–1	—	4–0	—	—	0–1	4–0	3–0	0–1	1–0	1–1	
Sweden	10	7–3	70%	2–1	2–1	3–0	0–1	—	1–2	6–1	3–1	3–2	1–0	5–3	
Switzerland	5	4–1	80%	1–0	1–0	0–1	1–0	1–0	2–0	1–1	1–1	3–0	—	3–1	
United States	47	21–26	45%	1–2	2–1	17–20	1–3	—	1–4	20–22	11–9	9–14	1–3	4–6	
Uzbekistan	3	3–0	100%	1–0	1–0	1–0	—	—	2–0	1–0	2–0	1–0	—	3–0	
Zimbabwe	2	1–1	50%	—	1–0	0–1	—	—	1–0	0–1	0–1	1–0	—	2–0	
Total	269	194–75	72%	36–26	28–10	110–30	6–6	14–3	23–21	157–51	69–18	73–49	52–8	81–36	
Total	Ties	W–L	%	Clay	Hard	Grass	Carpet	Unk'wn	In'	Out'	Home	Away	Neut'	WG/F	

Notes

^{1}Does not include ties where a walkover occurred:
- 1906 victory against Austria in Semifinals
- 1925 victory against Hawaii in America Zone Quarterfinals
- 1936 victory against Cuba in America Zone Semifinals
- 1939 victory against Brazil in America Zone Inter-zonal Final
- 1970 victory against South Korea in Eastern Zone A Quarterfinals
- 2009 loss to India in Asia/Oceania Group I Semifinals
^{2}Unknown surface changed to Indoor Hardcourt as per 2021 Davis Cup Finals, article and video

^{3}Includes ties competing as Czechoslovakia from 1924 to 1993
^{4}Includes ties competing as West Germany until 1988
^{5}Includes ties competing as British Isles until 1912
^{6}Unknown surface changed to Indoor Hardcourt as per 2021 Davis Cup Finals, article and video

^{7}Includes ties competing as Yugoslavia until 2003; and as Serbia and Montenegro from 2004 to 2006

=== Record against continents (since 1981) ===
As of 18 September 2016

Africa	Asia	Europe	North America	Oceania	South America
Morocco; South Africa; Zimbabwe	China; Chinese Taipei; India; Japan; Kazakhstan; South Korea; Uzbekistan	Austria; Belarus; Belgium; Croatia; Czech Republic; France; Germany; Great Britain; Hungary; Italy; Poland; Romania; Russia; Serbia; Slovakia; Spain; Sweden; Switzerland; Yugoslavia	Mexico; United States	New Zealand	Argentina; Brazil; Chile; Ecuador; Paraguay; Peru
Record: 2–2 (50%)	Record: 18–2 (87.5%)	Record: 34–19 (67.3%)	Record: 6–6 (50%)	Record: 3–0 (100%)	Record: 7–4 (63%)

=== Record by decade ===
Decade	Ties played	Ties won	Ties lost	Win %
1981–1989	27	20	7	74.00
1990–1999	28	19	9	67.80
2000–2009	28	18	10	64.20
2010–2019	18	12	6	73.33

== Results ==
=== Key to eras and positions result ===
- Challenge round era (1905–1971): The previous Davis Cup Champion would have a bye to and host the challenge round Final. Thus the losing team in the final (or Inter-zonal final) was the third-placed team. For the purposes of this table, the third placed team is grouped as semifinalists and the Zonal finalists (fourth and fifth placed teams) are grouped as quarterfinalists.
- 1972–1980: The previous Davis Cup Champion now had to compete in all rounds. There were four zones consisting of America, Eastern, Europe A and Europe B, with the competition culminating in a four team knockout between zonal winners. The zonal finalists were the equivalent of Davis Cup quarterfinalists.
- Since 1981: World Group (1981–2018), Davis Cup Finals (from 2019) consisting of 16 or 18 teams.
- Abbreviations: POW = Winner of World Group Playoff (1981–2018); POL = Lost in World Group Playoff (1981–2018); GS = Did not advance past the group stage of the Davis Cup Finals (from 2019); GI SF = Asia/Oceania Group I Semifinalists (1981–2018)

=== Results table ===
Result	Total	Challenge round era (1905–1971)		Post-Challenge round era			
Result	Total	Challenge round era (1905–1971)		1972–1980		Since 1981	
Result	Total	#	Years	#	Years	#	Years
Winners	28	22	1907, 1908, 1909, 1911, 1914, 1919, 1939, 1950, 1951, 1952, 1953, 1955, 1956, 1957, 1959, 1960, 1961, 1962, 1964, 1965, 1966, 1967	2	1973, 1977	4	1983, 1986, 1999, 2003
Finalists	20	15	1912, 1920, 1922, 1923, 1924, 1936, 1938, 1946, 1947, 1948, 1949, 1954, 1958, 1963, 1968	0	—	5	1990, 1993, 2000, 2001, 2022, 2023
Semifinalists	21	5	1905, 1906, 1921, 1925	6	1972, 1975, 1976, 1978, 1979, 1980	10	1981, 1982, 1984, 1985, 1987, 1989, 1997, 2006, 2015, 2017
Quarterfinalists	8	2	1933, 1937	1	1974	5	1988, 1991, 1992, 2005, 2019
Other results
Not in Top 5; (Note: Challenge round era (1905–1971) only); Lost in first round (Note: World Group (1981–2018) only) or group stage (Note: Davis Cup Finals (from 2019) only)	19	9	1913, 1928, 1930, 1932, 1935, 1937, 1969, 1970, 1971	—		10	POW (8): 1989, 1994, 1998, 2002, 2004, 2014, 2016, 2018 POL (2): 1995, 2007 GS (1): 2020–21
Not in World Group or Davis Cup Finals	7	—		—		7	POW (2): 1996, 2013 POL (4): 2008, 2010, 2011, 2012 GI SF (1): 2009

== See also ==
- List of Australia Davis Cup team representatives
- List of Australia Davis Cup team results
- Davis Cup
- Australia Billie Jean King Cup team
- Australia at the Hopman Cup
- Tennis Australia
