= New Zealand Davis Cup team =

Tennis team representing New Zealand

New Zealand
- Captain: Artem Sitak
- Nations Ranking: 39 ▼1 (20 September 2021)
- Colors: Black and White
- First year: 1924 (1905 as Australasia)
- Years played: 68
- Ties played (W–L): 134 (64–70)
- Years in World Group: 8 (5–8)
- Best finish: SF (1982)
- Most total wins: Onny Parun (30–32)
- Most singles wins: Jose Statham (24)
- Most doubles wins: James Greenhalgh (11–2)
- Best doubles team: Brett Steven/James Greenhalgh (6–1)
- Most ties played: Jose Statham (27)
- Most years played: Onny Parun (15)

The New Zealand men's national tennis team represents New Zealand in Davis Cup tennis competition and are governed by Tennis New Zealand.

New Zealand currently compete in Group II of the Asia/Oceania Zone. They have played in the World Group on 8 occasions, the most recent of which was in 1991. They reached the semifinals in 1982.

== History ==
New Zealand competed in its first Davis Cup in 1924. Prior to 1914, New Zealand competed together with Australia as Australasia. Australasia won the Davis Cup in 1907, 1908, 1909, 1911 and 1914. Anthony Wilding was the only New Zealander to play for Australasia, and he was part of the winning team in 1907, 1908, 1909 and 1914. The final of the 1911 Davis Cup was held in Christchurch from 1–3 January 1912, the first tie to be played in New Zealand. New Zealand was also the host for the finals nine years later, when they were held in Auckland.

New Zealand's best result as a separate team was a World Group semi-final in 1982, which they lost 2–3 to France on clay in Aix-en-Provence. New Zealand had beaten Spain by 3–2 on grass in Christchurch in the first round and Italy by 3–2 on clay in Cervia in the quarter-final. That year the New Zealand team comprised Chris Lewis, Onny Parun, Russell Simpson, and Bruce Derlin.

New Zealand also made in to the World Group quarter-finals in 1981, 1983, and 1990.

== Current team (2025) ==
- James Watt
- Ajeet Rai
- Finn Reynolds
- Jack Loutit
- Isaac Becroft

== Former players ==
Players who have competed in at least 10 ties.

- Marcus Daniell
- Kelly Evernden
- Brian Fairlie
- Lew Gerrard
- James Greenhalgh
- Alistair Hunt
- Daniel King-Turner
- Chris Lewis
- Mark Nielsen
- Onny Parun
- Russell Simpson
- Artem Sitak
- Rubin Statham
- Brett Steven
- Michael Venus

== See also ==
- Davis Cup
- New Zealand Billie Jean King Cup team
- New Zealand at the Hopman Cup
- Tennis New Zealand
