= Tennis New Zealand =

Governing body of tennis in New Zealand

Coordinates: 36.87929°S 174.842992°E

- Sport: Tennis
- Jurisdiction: National
- Abbreviation: (TNZ)
- Founded: 1886
- Affiliation: International Tennis Federation
- Affiliation date: 16 March 1923
- Regional affiliation: Oceania Tennis Federation
- Affiliation date: 1993
- Headquarters: Albany Tennis Park
- Location: Albany Tennis Park, 321 Oteha Valley Road Albany, Auckland
- Chairman: Terri-Ann Scorer
- CEO: Julie Paterson
- Replaced: New Zealand Lawn Tennis Association

Official website
- www.tennis.kiwi
- (New Zealand)

Tennis New Zealand (commonly known by the acronym Tennis NZ or TNZ) (formally the New Zealand Lawn Tennis Association) is the governing body of tennis in New Zealand. Founded in 1886, it is one of the world's oldest tennis associations. It is affiliated to both International Tennis Federation and Oceania Tennis Federation. Tennis NZ has six geographically divided regional centres. Tennis NZ operates all of the New Zealand's national representative tennis sides, including the New Zealand Davis Cup team, the New Zealand Billie Jean King Cup team and youth sides as well. Tennis NZ is also responsible for organising and hosting tennis tournaments within New Zealand and scheduling the home international fixtures.

== History ==
The history of tennis in New Zealand dates back to the 1870s, the decade when the development of modern tennis began. The first New Zealand Tennis Championships were played at Farndon Park in Clive, Hawke's Bay, in December 1885. New Zealand Lawn Tennis Association (NZLTA) was formed at a meeting held in Hastings in December 1886. Shortly after its inauguration, the New Zealand Association became affiliated with the Lawn Tennis Association (England).

In 1904 New Zealand Lawn Tennis Association amalgamated with six Australian state tennis associations to form the Lawn Tennis Association of Australasia. New Zealand Lawn Tennis Association played a significant role in the origin of the Australian Open. Lawn Tennis Association of Australasia created the tournament called The Australasian Mens Championships (which later became Australian Open) in 1905 and was first played in Warehouseman's Cricket Ground and it was decided that championships would be hosted by both Australian as well as New Zealand venues. New Zealand hosted the championship twice— Christchurch (1906) and Hastings (1912). The geographical remoteness of both the countries (Australia and New Zealand) made it difficult for foreign players to enter the tournament. In Christchurch in 1906, of a small field of 10 players, only two Australians attended, and the tournament was won by a New Zealander (Tony Wilding). Lawn Tennis Association of Australasia was one of the twelve national associations of tennis which established the International Lawn Tennis Federation (ILTF) in a conference in Paris, France, on 1 March 1913. From 1905 until 1919, New Zealand and Australian tennis players participated in the International Lawn Tennis Challenge (Davis Cup) under the alias of "Team Australasia", the team claimed a title six times (1907, 1908, 1909, 1911, 1914, 1919), however, there were attempts to severance this trans-Tasman partnership, in order to allow New Zealand players to represent their nation on international tennis events. In 1922, New Zealand dropped out from this partnership and on 16 March 1923 New Zealand Lawn Tennis Association was granted affiliation to the International Lawn Tennis Association and thereby became eligible to enter the International Lawn Tennis Challenge in its own right. New Zealand Lawn Tennis Association filed its first challenge with United States Lawn Tennis Association for 1924 International Lawn Tennis Challenge. Tennis New Zealand was the founding member of Oceania Tennis Federation in 1993.

== Constitution ==
The constitution of the organisation was adopted on 12 August 2006 in the Special General Meeting in which the main purpose of the organisation is defined as to promote, develop, enhance and protect the sport of tennis mainly as an amateur sport for the recreation and entertainment of the general public in New Zealand.

== Affiliates ==
=== Regional centres ===
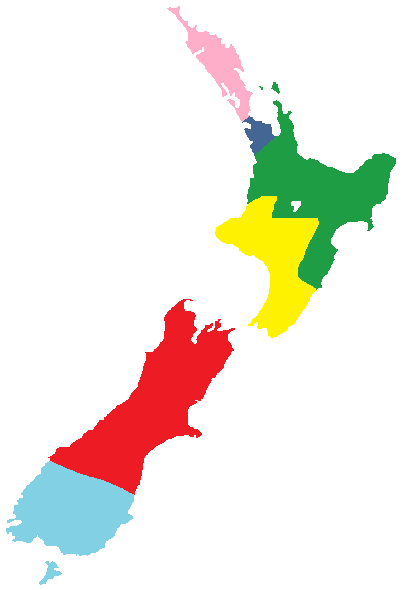
Regional Centres (with highlighted colours)

Tennis NZ consists of six regional centres which are affiliated to the national body. They control their own activities subject to any requirements which may, from time to time, be legislated for by the national body.

Region	Centre	Headquarter	CEO
Northern	Tennis Northern	Albany	Chris Casey
Auckland	Tennis Auckland	Auckland	Rohan West
Waikato-Bay	Tennis Waikato-Bays	Hamilton East	
Central	Tennis Central	Wellington	Tim Shanahan
Canterbury	Canterbury Tennis	Christchurch	Bevan Johns
Southern	Tennis Southern	Dunedin	

=== Organisations ===
Tennis NZ affiliates several different tennis related private organisations, which are:

- Aotearoa Maori Tennis Association (AMTA) - national tennis body of Māori people.
- NZ Tennis Umpires Association (NZTUA) – national body, which governs tennis officiating in New Zealand.
- International Lawn Tennis Club of NZ – member of Council of International Lawn Tennis Clubs, established in 1956 and has around 130 members.
- NZ Wheelchair Tennis – Hamilton based organisation affiliated with International Wheelchair Tennis Association (IWTA) governs Wheelchair tennis in New Zealand.
- Seniors Tennis NZ – national association for tennis players aged 35 years and above.

== Tournaments ==
Tennis NZ annually organises range of events from local tournaments to national and international events. Tennis Auckland hosts two major events of international tennis tournaments each year at the ASB Tennis Centre, Parnell, just prior to Australian Open:

- ASB Classic – is a most prominent women's and men's tournament of New Zealand. This ATP Tour and WTA Tour event is an International series tournament and is played on outdoor hardcourts during the first week of the tennis season.
