= 1912 International Lawn Tennis Challenge =

1912 edition of the International Lawn Tennis Challenge

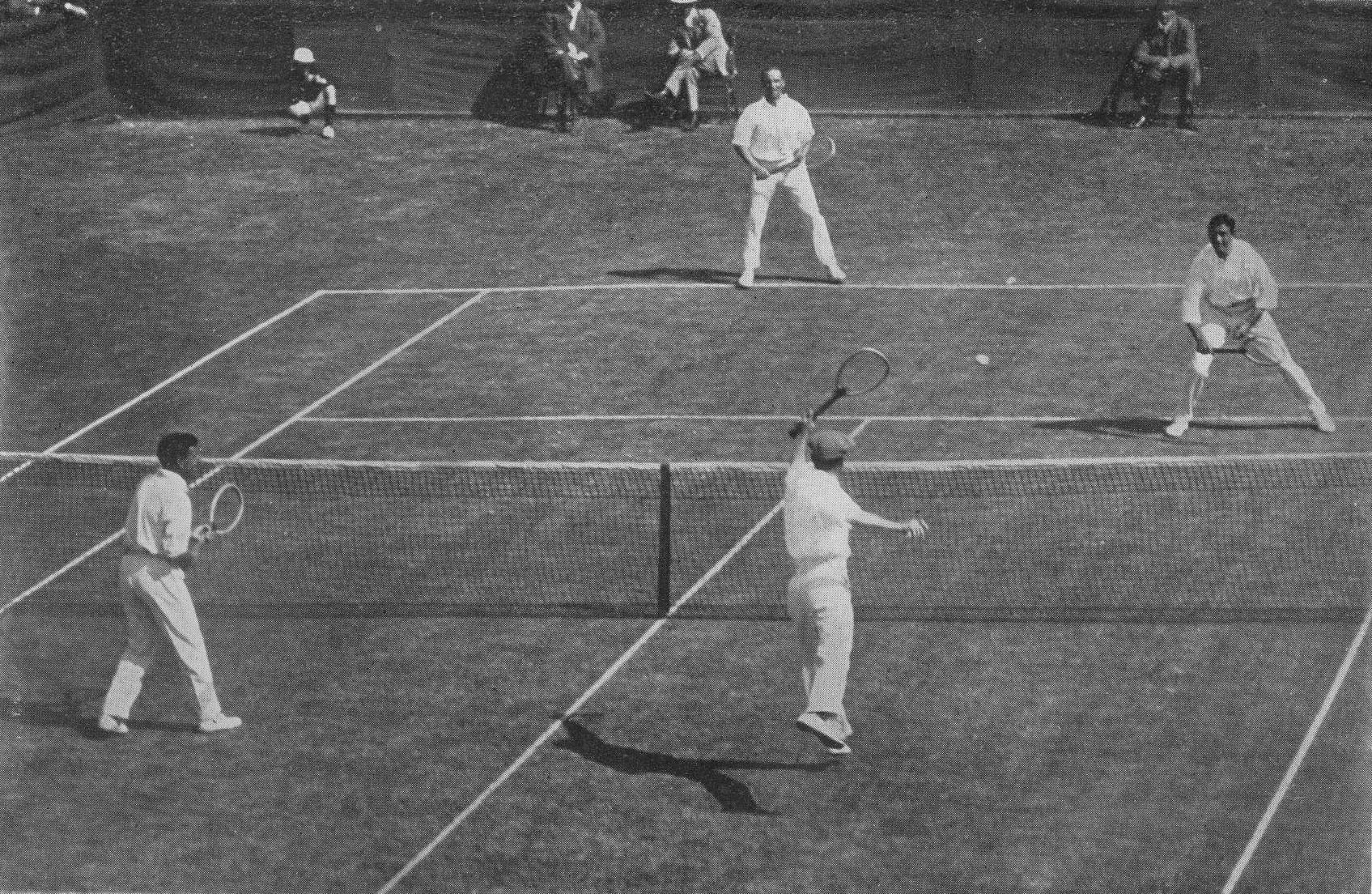
- 1912 International Lawn Tennis Challenge (Davis Cup) finals match between Australasia and the British Isles played at the Albert Ground in Melbourne, Australia on 28–30 November. Players shown on the near side are Alfred Dunlop (left) and Norman Brookes (right) for Australasia and on the far side James Cecil Parke (left) and Alfred Beamish (right) for the British Isles.

Details
- Duration: 11 July – 30 November 1912
- Edition: 11th
- Teams: 3

Champion
- Winning nation: British Isles

The 1912 International Lawn Tennis Challenge was the 11th edition of what is now known as the Davis Cup. After a six-year hiatus, France rejoined the competition; however, the United States pulled out of the competition. In the final, the British Isles regained the Cup from Australasia. The final was played at the Albert Ground in Melbourne, Australia on 28–30 November.

== Draw ==
Semifinals; 11–13 July
Folkestone, England (grass)
British Isles	4
France	1
bye
United States

Final
British Isles^{1}	w/o
United States

Notes

1. The final was scratched and the British Isles were granted the right to play Australasia in the Challenge Round as the United States were unable to field a team.

=== Semifinal ===
British Isles vs. France

British Isles
4
Pleasure Gardens, Folkestone, England
11–13 July 1912
Grass

France
1

			1	2	3	4	5
1	(United Kingdom) (France)	Charles Dixon; Max Decugis	6; 3	6; 2	6; 4
2	(United Kingdom) (France)	Arthur Gore; André Gobert	4; 6	6; 4	3; 6	3; 6
3	(United Kingdom) (France)	Charles Dixon / Herbert Roper Barrett; André Gobert / William Laurentz	3; 6	6; 4	6; 1	6; 1
4	(United Kingdom) (France)	Charles Dixon; André Gobert	4; 6	6; 4	6; 2	6; 3
5	(United Kingdom) (France)	Arthur Gore; Max Decugis	6; 3	6; 0				retired

== Challenge Round ==
Australasia vs. British Isles

Australasia
2
Albert Ground, Melbourne, Australia
28–30 November 1912
Grass

British Isles
3

			1	2	3	4	5
1	(Australasia) (United Kingdom)	Norman Brookes; James Cecil Parke	6; 8	3; 6	7; 5	2; 6
2	(Australasia) (United Kingdom)	Rodney Heath; Charles Dixon	7; 5	4; 6	4; 6	4; 6
3	(Australasia) (United Kingdom)	Norman Brookes / Alfred Dunlop; Alfred Beamish / James Cecil Parke	6; 4	6; 1	7; 5
4	(Australasia) (United Kingdom)	Norman Brookes; Charles Dixon	6; 2	6; 4	6; 4
5	(Australasia) (United Kingdom)	Rodney Heath; James Cecil Parke	3; 6	4; 6	4; 6
