= 1906 International Lawn Tennis Challenge =

1906 edition of the International Lawn Tennis Challenge

Details
- Duration: 7 – 18 June 1906
- Edition: 6th
- Teams: 3

Champion
- Winning nation: British Isles

The 1906 International Lawn Tennis Challenge was the sixth edition of what is now known as the Davis Cup. As defending champions, the British Isles team played host to the competition. For the first time, the ties were not all played at the same location. The "World Group" ties were played at the Newport Athletic Club in Newport, Monmouthshire, Wales from 7–9 June, and the final was played at Worple Road (the former site of the All England Club) in Wimbledon, London, England on 15–18 June. Britain retained the Cup for their fourth championship.

== Draw ==
Semifinals
Australasia	w/o ^{1}
Austria
United States	w/o ^{1}
France

Final; 7–9 June
Newport, Wales (grass)
Australasia	2
United States	3

^{1} Both semifinals were scratched and Australasia and the United States advanced to the final as Austria and France failed to appear.

=== Final ===
Australasia vs. United States

Australasia
2
Newport Athletic Club, Newport, Wales
7–9 June 1906
Grass

United States
3

			1	2	3	4	5
1	(Australasia) (United States)	Les Poidevin; Holcombe Ward	2; 6	4; 6	5; 7
2	(Australasia) (United States)	Anthony Wilding; Raymond Little	6; 2	8; 6	6; 1
3	(Australasia) (United States)	Les Poidevin / Anthony Wilding; Raymond Little / Holcombe Ward	5; 7	2; 6	4; 6
4	(Australasia) (United States)	Anthony Wilding; Holcombe Ward	6; 3	3; 6	0; 6	6; 4	8; 6
5	(Australasia) (United States)	Les Poidevin; Raymond Little	2; 6	6; 1	5; 7	2; 6

== Challenge Round ==
British Isles vs. United States

British Isles
5
Worple Road, Wimbledon, England
15–18 June 1906
Grass

United States
0

			1	2	3	4	5
1	(United Kingdom) (United States)	Sydney Smith; Raymond Little	6; 4	6; 4	6; 1
2	(United Kingdom) (United States)	Laurence Doherty; Holcombe Ward	6; 2	8; 6	6; 3
3	(United Kingdom) (United States)	Laurence Doherty / Reginald Doherty; Raymond Little / Holcombe Ward	3; 6	11; 9	9; 7	6; 1
4	(United Kingdom) (United States)	Sydney Smith; Holcombe Ward	6; 1	6; 0	6; 4
5	(United Kingdom) (United States)	Laurence Doherty; Raymond Little	3; 6	6; 3	6; 8	6; 1	6; 3
