= 1920 International Lawn Tennis Challenge =

1920 edition of the International Lawn Tennis Challenge

Details
- Duration: 11 June 1920 – 1 January 1921
- Edition: 15th
- Teams: 6

Champion
- Winning nation: United States

The 1920 International Lawn Tennis Challenge, more commonly known as the Davis Cup, was the 15th edition of the major international team event in men's tennis. Six nations registered for the right to challenge holders Australasia. However, only five nations competed, because of the withdraw of Canada. The Netherlands joined the competition for the first time.

The initial draw consisted of four countries and drew the United States against France and the Netherlands against Great Britain. The applications of Canada and South Africa were received after the deadline but their entries were accepted by the other countries and subsequently a new draw was made.

"Big Bill" Tilden and "Little Bill" Johnston made their debut for the United States, and would not lose a rubber the entire tournament. In the Challenge Round, they reclaimed the cup from Australasia. The final, in honor of Anthony Wilding, was played at the Domain Cricket Club in Auckland, New Zealand on 30 December - 1 January 1921.

== Draw ==
Netherlands competed for the first time.

Quarterfinals; 11 June–10 July

Semifinals; 16–19 July

Final

=== Quarterfinals ===
Netherlands vs. South Africa

Netherlands
3
Arnhem, Netherlands
11–13 June 1920
Clay

South Africa
2

			1	2	3	4	5
1	(Netherlands) (South Africa)	Christiaan van Lennep; Charles Winslow	3; 6	4; 6	4; 6
2	(Netherlands) (South Africa)	Arthur Diemer Kool; Louis Raymond	6; 3	6; 3	7; 5
3	(Netherlands) (South Africa)	Arthur Diemer Kool / Christiaan van Lennep; Louis Raymond / Charles Winslow	6; 2	7; 5	6; 4
4	(Netherlands) (South Africa)	Arthur Diemer Kool; Charles Winslow	3; 6	2; 6	5; 7
5	(Netherlands) (South Africa)	Christiaan van Lennep; Louis Raymond	4; 6	6; 4	6; 4	3; 6	6; 3

France vs. United States

France
0
Devonshire Park Lawn Tennis Club, Eastbourne, England
8–10 July 1920
Grass

United States
3

			1	2	3	4	5
1	(France) (United States)	André Gobert; Bill Johnston	3; 6	6; 8	3; 6
2	(France) (United States)	William Laurentz; Bill Tilden	6; 4	2; 6	1; 6	3; 6
3	(France) (United States)	André Gobert / William Laurentz; Bill Johnston / Bill Tilden	2; 6	3; 6	2; 6
4	(France) (United States)	André Gobert; Bill Tilden						not played
5	(France) (United States)	William Laurentz; Bill Johnston						not played

=== Semifinal ===
Great Britain vs. United States

Great Britain
0
Worple Road, Wimbledon, London, England
16–19 July 1920
Grass

United States
5

			1	2	3	4	5
1	(United Kingdom) (United States)	James Cecil Parke; Bill Johnston	4; 6	4; 6	6; 2	6; 3	2; 6
2	(United Kingdom) (United States)	Algernon Kingscote; Bill Tilden	6; 4	1; 6	3; 6	1; 6
3	(United Kingdom) (United States)	Algernon Kingscote / James Cecil Parke; Bill Johnston / Bill Tilden	6; 8	6; 4	6; 4	3; 6	2; 6
4	(United Kingdom) (United States)	Algernon Kingscote; Bill Johnston	4; 6	6; 4	6; 3	4; 6	5; 7
5	(United Kingdom) (United States)	James Cecil Parke; Bill Tilden	2; 6	3; 6	5; 7

== Challenge Round ==
Australasia vs. United States

Australasia
0
Domain Cricket Club, Auckland, New Zealand
30 December 1920–1 January 1921
Grass

United States
5

			1	2	3	4	5
1	(Australasia) (United States)	Norman Brookes; Bill Tilden	8; 10	4; 6	6; 1	4; 6
2	(Australasia) (United States)	Gerald Patterson; Bill Johnston	3; 6	1; 6	1; 6
3	(Australasia) (United States)	Norman Brookes / Gerald Patterson; Bill Johnston / Bill Tilden	6; 4	4; 6	0; 6	4; 6
4	(Australasia) (United States)	Gerald Patterson; Bill Tilden	7; 5	2; 6	3; 6	3; 6
5	(Australasia) (United States)	Norman Brookes; Bill Johnston	7; 5	5; 7	3; 6	3; 6
