= Australasia Davis Cup team =

Australasia
- Nations Ranking: N/A
- First year: 1905
- Years played: 13
- Ties played (W–L): 25 (18-7)
- Davis Cup titles: 6 (1907, 1908, 1909, 1911, 1914, 1919)
- Runners-up: 1 (1912)
- Most total wins: Norman Brookes (28-11)
- Most singles wins: Norman Brookes (18-7)
- Most doubles wins: Norman Brookes (10-4)
- Best doubles team: Norman Brookes and Anthony Wilding (6-2)
- Most ties played: Norman Brookes (14)
- Most years played: Norman Brookes (9)

The Australasia men's national tennis team represented Australia and New Zealand in Davis Cup tennis competition, and was governed by the Australasian Lawn Tennis Association.

It competed from 1905 through 1922. Following 1922, the nations competed as:

- Australia men's national tennis team (began 1923; historical records assumed by Australia)
- New Zealand Davis Cup team (began 1924)

== History ==
In October 1904 the New Zealand Tennis Association contacted Australian officials with a proposal to enter a combined team at the 1905 Davis Cup. This proposal was accepted in January 1905 when New Zealand reluctantly agreed to form a joint Australasian Lawn Tennis Association.

The 1911 Davis Cup was played at Lancaster Park, where Australasia as the defending champion was challenged by the United States. Rain delayed the beginning of the games scheduled for 29 December 1911, and the 1911 Davis Cup event was held between 1 and 3 January 1912. Australian Norman Brookes beat Beals Wright in the opening match. Rodney Heath increased the lead for Australasia by beating William Larned. Australasia retained the Davis Cup through a win in the doubles, with Brookes and Alfred Dunlop being successful over Wright and Maurice McLoughlin. The fourth match was defaulted by Wright, and Larned stepped aside to give the younger McLoughlin the opportunity to play Brookes. After leading 2 sets to 1, Brookes came back and won the match, and gave Australasia a clean 5–0 victory.
