= 1905 International Lawn Tennis Challenge =

1905 edition of the International Lawn Tennis Challenge

Details
- Duration: 13 – 24 July 1905
- Edition: 5th
- Teams: 5

Champion
- Winning nation: British Isles

The 1905 International Lawn Tennis Challenge was the fifth edition of what is now known as the Davis Cup. As defending champions, the British Isles team played host to the competition. The World Group ties were played at Queen's Club in London, England from 13–19 July, and the final was played on 21–24 July. Britain retained the Cup for their third championship.

== Teams ==
Australasia, a combined Australia-New Zealand team, and Austria joined the competition for the first time. The United States returned after a 1-year hiatus, and France would return for their second year. For the first time, a "World Group" tournament was held to determine which team would challenge the British Isles for the cup.

== Draw ==
Quarterfinals
France
bye
United States^{1}	w/o
Belgium
bye
Australasia
bye
Austria

Semifinals; 13–15 July
France	0
United States	5
Australasia	5
Austria	0

Final; 17–19 July
United States	5
Australasia	0

Notes

1. The match was scratched and the United States advanced to the semifinals as Belgium were unable to field a team due to player illness.

=== Semifinals ===
France vs. United States

France
0
Queen's Club, London, England
13–15 July 1905
Grass

United States
5

			1	2	3	4	5
1	(France) (United States)	Maurice Germot; Holcombe Ward	2; 6	2; 6	1; 6
2	(France) (United States)	Max Decugis; William Clothier	3; 6	4; 6	4; 6
3	(France) (United States)	Max Decugis / Maurice Germot; Holcombe Ward / Beals Wright	2; 6	2; 6	2; 6
4	(France) (United States)	Max Decugis; Holcombe Ward	2; 6	2; 6	1; 6
5	(France) (United States)	Maurice Germot; William Clothier	3; 6	7; 5	1; 6	3; 6

Australasia vs. Austria

Australasia
5
Queen's Club, London, England
13–15 July 1905
Grass

Austria
0

			1	2	3	4	5
1	(Australasia) (Austria)	Norman Brookes; Rolf Kinzl	6; 0	6; 1	6; 2
2	(Australasia) (Austria)	Anthony Wilding; Kurt von Wessely	4; 6	6; 3	7; 5	6; 1
3	(Australasia) (Austria)	Norman Brookes / Alfred Dunlop; Rolf Kinzl / Kurt von Wessely	9; 7	6; 2	7; 5
4	(Australasia) (Austria)	Norman Brookes; Kurt von Wessely	6; 0	6; 2	6; 2
5	(Australasia) (Austria)	Anthony Wilding; Rolf Kinzl	6; 3	4; 6	6; 2	6; 4

=== Final ===
United States vs. Australasia

United States
5
Queen's Club, London, England
17–19 July 1905
Grass

Australasia
0

			1	2	3	4	5
1	(United States) (Australasia)	Beals Wright; Norman Brookes	12; 10	5; 7	12; 10	6; 4
2	(United States) (Australasia)	William Larned; Anthony Wilding	6; 3	6; 2	6; 4
3	(United States) (Australasia)	Holcombe Ward / Beals Wright; Norman Brookes / Alfred Dunlop	6; 4	7; 5	5; 7	6; 2
4	(United States) (Australasia)	Beals Wright; Anthony Wilding	6; 3	6; 3
5	(United States) (Australasia)	William Larned; Norman Brookes	14; 12	6; 0	6; 3

== Challenge Round ==
British Isles vs. United States

British Isles
5
Worple Road, Wimbledon, England
21–24 July 1905
Grass

United States
0

			1	2	3	4	5
1	(United Kingdom) (United States)	Laurence Doherty; Holcombe Ward	7; 9	4; 6	6; 1	6; 2	6; 0
2	(United Kingdom) (United States)	Sydney Smith; William Larned	6; 4	6; 4	5; 7	6; 4
3	(United Kingdom) (United States)	Laurence Doherty / Reggie Doherty; Holcombe Ward / Beals Wright	8; 10	6; 2	6; 2	4; 6	8; 6
4	(United Kingdom) (United States)	Laurence Doherty; William Larned	6; 4	2; 6	6; 8	6; 4	6; 2
5	(United Kingdom) (United States)	Sydney Smith; William Clothier	3; 6	6; 1	6; 4	6; 3
