= 1903 International Lawn Tennis Challenge =

1903 edition of the International Lawn Tennis Challenge

Details
- Duration: 4 – 8 August 1903
- Edition: 3rd
- Teams: 2

Champion
- Winning nation: British Isles

The 1903 International Lawn Tennis Challenge was the third edition of what is now known as the Davis Cup. The British Isles team returned to the United States to contest the Cup. The tie was played at the Longwood Cricket Club in Boston, Massachusetts (the same location as the first competition in 1900). The British won 4–1, bringing the Cup to Britain for the first time.

== Result ==
United States vs. British Isles

United States
1
Longwood Cricket Club, Boston, MA, United States
4–8 August 1903
Grass

British Isles
4

			1	2	3	4	5
1	(United States) (United Kingdom)	William Larned; Reginald Doherty						w/o
2	(United States) (United Kingdom)	Robert Wrenn; Laurence Doherty	0; 6	3; 6	4; 6
3	(United States) (United Kingdom)	George Wrenn / Robert Wrenn; Laurence Doherty / Reginald Doherty	5; 7	7; 9	6; 2	3; 6
4	(United States) (United Kingdom)	William Larned; Laurence Doherty	3; 6	8; 6	0; 6	6; 2	5; 7
5	(United States) (United Kingdom)	Robert Wrenn; Reginald Doherty	4; 6	6; 3	3; 6	8; 6	4; 6
