= 1914 International Lawn Tennis Challenge =

1914 edition of the International Lawn Tennis Challenge

Details
- Duration: 7 July – 15 August 1914
- Edition: 13th
- Teams: 7

Champion
- Winning nation: Australasia

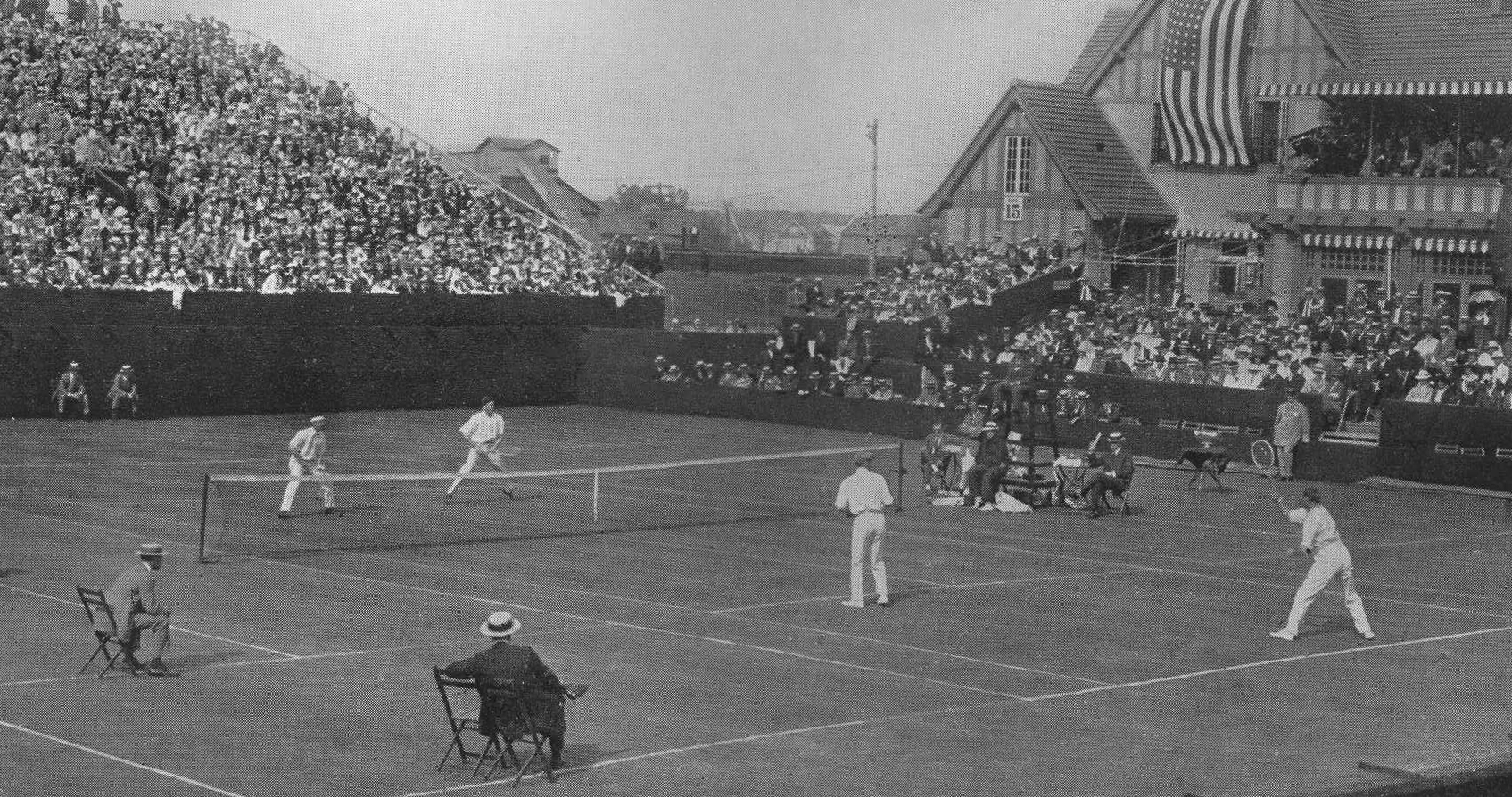
1914 International Lawn Tennis Challenge (Davis Cup) finals match between Australasia and the United States played at the West Side Tennis Club in New York on 13–15 August. Players shown on the near side are Norman Brookes (left) and Anthony Wilding (right) for Australasia and on the far side Thomas Bundy (left) and Maurice McLoughlin (right) for the United States.

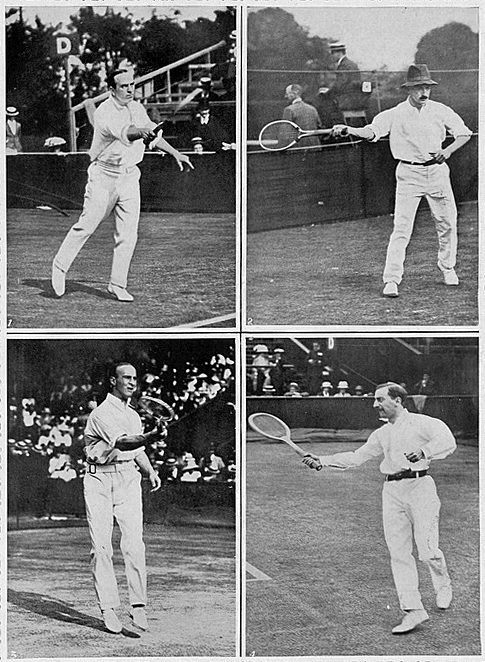
The British 1914 Davis Cup team consisting of Herbert Roper Barrett (top left), Algernon Kingscote (top right), James Cecil Parke (bottom left) and Theodore Mavrogordato (bottom right).

The 1914 International Lawn Tennis Challenge was the 13th edition of what is now known as the Davis Cup. The bulk of the competition returned to the United States for the first time since 1903. The United States fell to Australasia in the final, which was played at the West Side Tennis Club in New York on 13–15 August.

== Draw ==
Quarterfinals; 7–25 July
Germany
bye
Lake Forest, IL, United States (grass)
Australasia	5
Canada	0
Folkestone, England (grass)
Great Britain	5
Belgium	0
bye
France

Semifinals; 11 July–1 August
Pittsburgh, United States (grass)
Germany	0
Australasia	5
Wimbledon, England (grass)
Great Britain	4
France	1

Final; 6–8 August
Boston, United States (grass)
Australasia	3
Great Britain	2

=== Quarterfinals ===
Australasia vs. Canada

Australasia
5
Onwentsia Club, Lake Forest, IL, United States
23–25 July 1914
Grass

Canada
0

			1	2	3	4	5
1	(Australasia) (Canada)	Norman Brookes; Bernard Schwengers	6; 2	6; 3	6; 2
2	(Australasia) (Canada)	Anthony Wilding; Robert Powell	6; 1	6; 2	6; 2
3	(Australasia) (Canada)	Norman Brookes / Anthony Wilding; Robert Powell / Bernard Schwengers	6; 4	6; 3	6; 4
4	(Australasia) (Canada)	Norman Brookes; Robert Powell	6; 0	6; 1	6; 3
5	(Australasia) (Canada)	Anthony Wilding; Bernard Schwengers	7; 5	6; 3	6; 1

Great Britain vs. Belgium

Great Britain
5
Pleasure Gardens, Folkestone, England
7–9 July 1914
Grass

Belgium
0

			1	2	3	4	5
1	(United Kingdom) (Belgium)	James Cecil Parke; Georges Watson	6; 2	6; 2	6; 3
2	(United Kingdom) (Belgium)	Theodore Mavrogordato; Paul de Borman	6; 1	6; 3	8; 6
3	(United Kingdom) (Belgium)	Theodore Mavrogordato / Herbert Roper Barrett; William du Vivier / Georges Watson	6; 1	6; 2	6; 2
4	(United Kingdom) (Belgium)	James Cecil Parke; Paul de Borman	6; 4	6; 3	6; 0
5	(United Kingdom) (Belgium)	Theodore Mavrogordato; Georges Watson	6; 1	6; 0	6; 3

=== Semifinals ===
Australasia vs. Germany

Australasia
5
Allegheny County Club, Pittsburgh, PA, United States
30 July–1 August 1914
Grass

Germany
0

			1	2	3	4	5
1	(Australasia) (Germany)	Norman Brookes; Otto Froitzheim	10; 8	6; 1	6; 2
2	(Australasia) (Germany)	Anthony Wilding; Oscar Kreuzer	6; 2	6; 2	6; 4
3	(Australasia) (Germany)	Norman Brookes / Anthony Wilding; Otto Froitzheim / Oscar Kreuzer	6; 1	6; 1	6; 2
4	(Australasia) (Germany)	Norman Brookes; Oscar Kreuzer	6; 4	6; 2	6; 8	6; 2
5	(Australasia) (Germany)	Anthony Wilding; Otto Froitzheim	6; 3	6; 4	6; 2

Great Britain vs. France

Great Britain
4
Worple Road, Wimbledon, London, England
11–14 July 1914
Grass

France
1

			1	2	3	4	5
1	(United Kingdom) (France)	Theodore Mavrogordato; Maurice Germot	4; 6	7; 5	9; 7	6; 2
2	(United Kingdom) (France)	James Cecil Parke; Max Decugis	6; 2	4; 6	3; 6	6; 3	6; 3
3	(United Kingdom) (France)	Theodore Mavrogordato / Herbert Roper Barrett; Max Decugis / Maurice Germot	3; 6	7; 5	5; 7	4; 6
4	(United Kingdom) (France)	James Cecil Parke; Maurice Germot	7; 5	6; 1	6; 3
5	(United Kingdom) (France)	Theodore Mavrogordato; Max Decugis	6; 1	7; 5	7; 5

=== Final ===
Great Britain vs. Australasia

Australasia
3
Longwood Cricket Club, New York, NY, United States
6–8 August 1914
Grass

Great Britain
2

			1	2	3	4	5
1	(Australasia) (United Kingdom)	Norman Brookes; James Cecil Parke	6; 2	4; 6	6; 3	1; 6	7; 5
2	(Australasia) (United Kingdom)	Anthony Wilding; Arthur Lowe	6; 3	6; 1	16; 14
3	(Australasia) (United Kingdom)	Norman Brookes / Anthony Wilding; Theodore Mavrogordato / James Cecil Parke	6; 1	6; 0	6; 4
4	(Australasia) (United Kingdom)	Norman Brookes; Arthur Lowe						w/o
5	(Australasia) (United Kingdom)	Anthony Wilding; James Cecil Parke						w/o

== Challenge Round ==
United States vs. Australasia

United States
2
West Side Tennis Club, New York, NY, United States
13–15 August 1914
Grass

Australasia
3

			1	2	3	4	5
1	(United States) (Australasia)	Richard Norris Williams; Anthony Wilding	5; 7	2; 6	3; 6
2	(United States) (Australasia)	Maurice McLoughlin; Norman Brookes	17; 15	6; 3	6; 3
3	(United States) (Australasia)	Thomas Bundy / Maurice McLoughlin; Norman Brookes / Anthony Wilding	3; 6	6; 8	7; 9
4	(United States) (Australasia)	Richard Norris Williams; Norman Brookes	1; 6	2; 6	10; 8	3; 6
5	(United States) (Australasia)	Maurice McLoughlin; Anthony Wilding	6; 2	6; 3	2; 6	6; 2
