= 1919 International Lawn Tennis Challenge =

1919 edition of the International Lawn Tennis Challenge

Details
- Duration: 11 July 1919 – 21 January 1920
- Edition: 14th
- Teams: 5

Champion
- Winning nation: Australasia

The 1919 International Lawn Tennis Challenge was the 14th edition of what is now known as the Davis Cup. Following four years of non-competition due to World War I, the competition resumed with four teams challenging Australasia for the cup. Australasia defeated Great Britain to retain the title. The final was played at the Double Bay Grounds in Sydney, Australia on 16–21 January 1920.

== Draw ==
Semifinals; 11–28 July
Brussels, Belgium
Belgium	0
France	3
Eastbourne, England (grass)
Great Britain	4
South Africa	1

Final; 25–27 August
Deauville, France (clay)
France	2
Great Britain	3

=== Semifinals ===
Belgium vs. France

Belgium
0
Brussels, Belgium
11–13 July 1919

France
3

			1	2	3	4	5
1	(Belgium) (France)	Paul de Borman; Max Decugis	2; 6	3; 6	4; 6
2	(Belgium) (France)	Albert Lammens; William Laurentz	7; 5	3; 6	4; 6	2; 6
3	(Belgium) (France)	Paul de Borman / Albert Lammens; Max Decugis / William Laurentz	3; 6	5; 7	2; 6
4	(Belgium) (France)	Paul de Borman; William Laurentz						not played
5	(Belgium) (France)	Albert Lammens; Max Decugis						not played

Great Britain vs. South Africa

Great Britain
4
Devonshire Park Lawn Tennis Club, Eastbourne, England
25–28 July 1919
Grass

South Africa
1

			1	2	3	4	5
1	(United Kingdom) (South Africa)	Algernon Kingscote; George Dodd	6; 3	6; 3	6; 2
2	(United Kingdom) (South Africa)	Theodore Mavrogordato; Louis Raymond	1; 6	7; 5	2; 6	8; 6	6; 1
3	(United Kingdom) (South Africa)	Algernon Kingscote / Herbert Roper Barrett; Harold Aitken / George Dodd	7; 5	9; 7	6; 4
4	(United Kingdom) (South Africa)	Algernon Kingscote; Louis Raymond	1; 6	6; 0	6; 4	6; 1
5	(United Kingdom) (South Africa)	Theodore Mavrogordato; George Dodd	7; 9	5; 7	6; 3	6; 4	5; 7

=== Final ===
France vs. Great Britain

France
2
Sporting Club, Deauville, France
25–27 August 1919
Clay

Great Britain
3

			1	2	3	4	5
1	(France) (United Kingdom)	André Gobert; Percival Davson	7; 5	6; 4	4; 6	6; 4
2	(France) (United Kingdom)	William Laurentz; Algernon Kingscote	6; 4	3; 6	2; 6	6; 4	4; 6
3	(France) (United Kingdom)	André Gobert / William Laurentz; Herbert Roper Barrett / Noel Turnbull	6; 0	6; 1	12; 10
4	(France) (United Kingdom)	André Gobert; Algernon Kingscote	4; 6	4; 6	5; 7
5	(France) (United Kingdom)	William Laurentz; Percival Davson	4; 6	6; 1	12; 10	4; 6	0; 6

== Challenge Round ==
Australasia vs. Great Britain

Australasia
4
Double Bay Grounds, Sydney, Australia
16–21 January 1920
Grass

Great Britain
1

			1	2	3	4	5
1	(Australasia) (United Kingdom)	James Anderson; Algernon Kingscote	5; 7	2; 6	4; 6
2	(Australasia) (United Kingdom)	Gerald Patterson; Arthur Lowe	6; 4	6; 3	2; 6	6; 3
3	(Australasia) (United Kingdom)	Norman Brookes / Gerald Patterson; Alfred Beamish / Algernon Kingscote	6; 0	6; 0	6; 2
4	(Australasia) (United Kingdom)	Gerald Patterson; Algernon Kingscote	6; 4	6; 4	8; 6
5	(Australasia) (United Kingdom)	James Anderson; Arthur Lowe	6; 4	5; 7	6; 3	4; 6	12; 10
