= 1908 International Lawn Tennis Challenge =

1908 edition of the International Lawn Tennis Challenge

Details
- Duration: 17 September – 30 November 1908
- Edition: 8th
- Teams: 3

Champion
- Winning nation: Australasia

The 1908 International Lawn Tennis Challenge was the eighth edition of what is now known as the Davis Cup. For the first time, ties were held in different countries and at different times, rather than all the matches being played in the same venue, as before. It also marked the first time that a tie was played in Australia.

After Australasia's victory in 1907, the United States and the British Isles tried to re-claim the cup, however the Australasia team prevailed again. The final was played at the Albert Ground in Melbourne, Australia on 27–30 November.

== Final ==
United States vs. British Isles

United States
4
Longwood Cricket Club, Boston, MA, United States
17–19 September 1908
Grass

British Isles
1

			1	2	3	4	5
1	(United States) (United Kingdom)	William Larned; James Cecil Parke	6; 3	6; 3	7; 5
2	(United States) (United Kingdom)	Beals Wright; Major Ritchie	1; 6	3; 6	2; 6
3	(United States) (United Kingdom)	Fred Alexander / Harold Hackett; James Cecil Parke / Major Ritchie	6; 3	2; 6	7; 5	6; 1
4	(United States) (United Kingdom)	William Larned; Major Ritchie	4; 6	6; 2	6; 3	6; 2
5	(United States) (United Kingdom)	Beals Wright; James Cecil Parke	8; 10	3; 6	6; 4	7; 5	6; 2

== Challenge Round ==
Australasia vs. United States

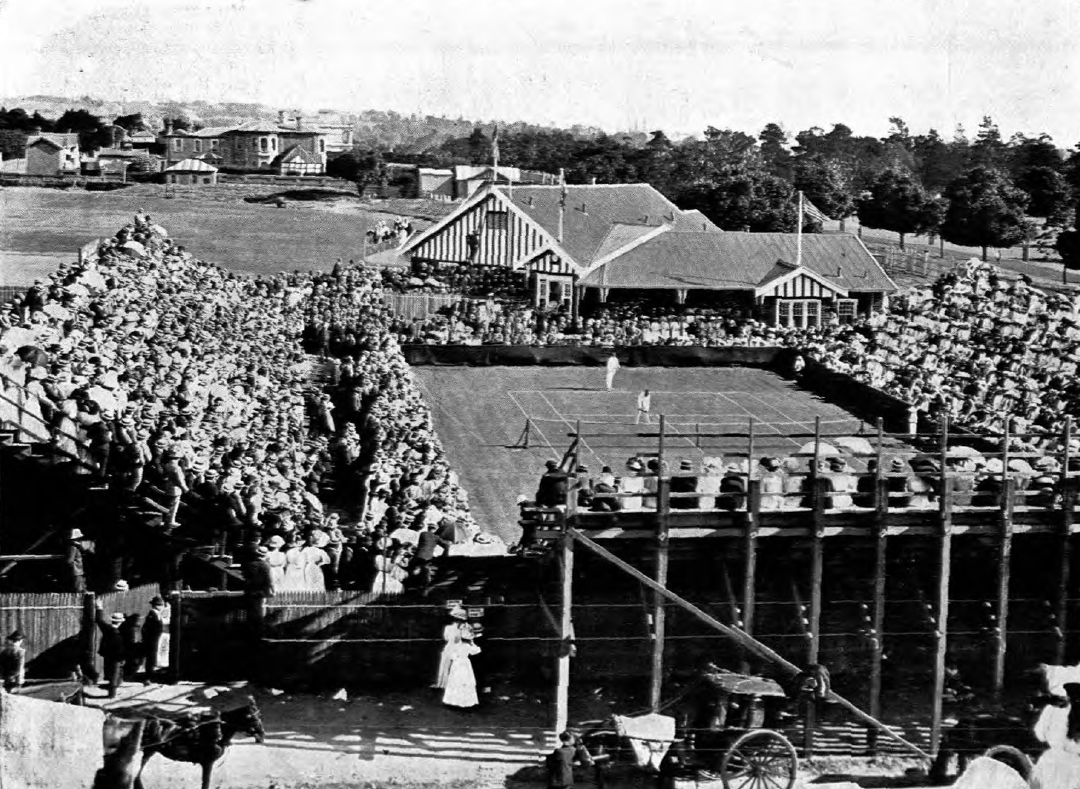
1908 Davis Cup Challenge Round match between Australasia and the United States at the Albert Ground, Melbourne, Australia on 27–30 November 1908

Australasia
3
Albert Ground, Melbourne, Australia
27–30 November 1908
Grass

United States
2

			1	2	3	4	5
1	(Australasia) (United States)	Norman Brookes; Fred Alexander	5; 7	9; 7	6; 2	4; 6	6; 3
2	(Australasia) (United States)	Anthony Wilding; Beals Wright	6; 3	5; 7	3; 6	1; 6
3	(Australasia) (United States)	Norman Brookes / Anthony Wilding; Fred Alexander / Beals Wright	6; 4	6; 2	5; 7	2; 6	6; 4
4	(Australasia) (United States)	Norman Brookes; Beals Wright	6; 0	6; 3	5; 7	2; 6	10; 12
5	(Australasia) (United States)	Anthony Wilding; Fred Alexander	6; 3	6; 4	6; 1
