= Norman Brookes =

Australian tennis player (1877–1968)

Sir Norman Brookes
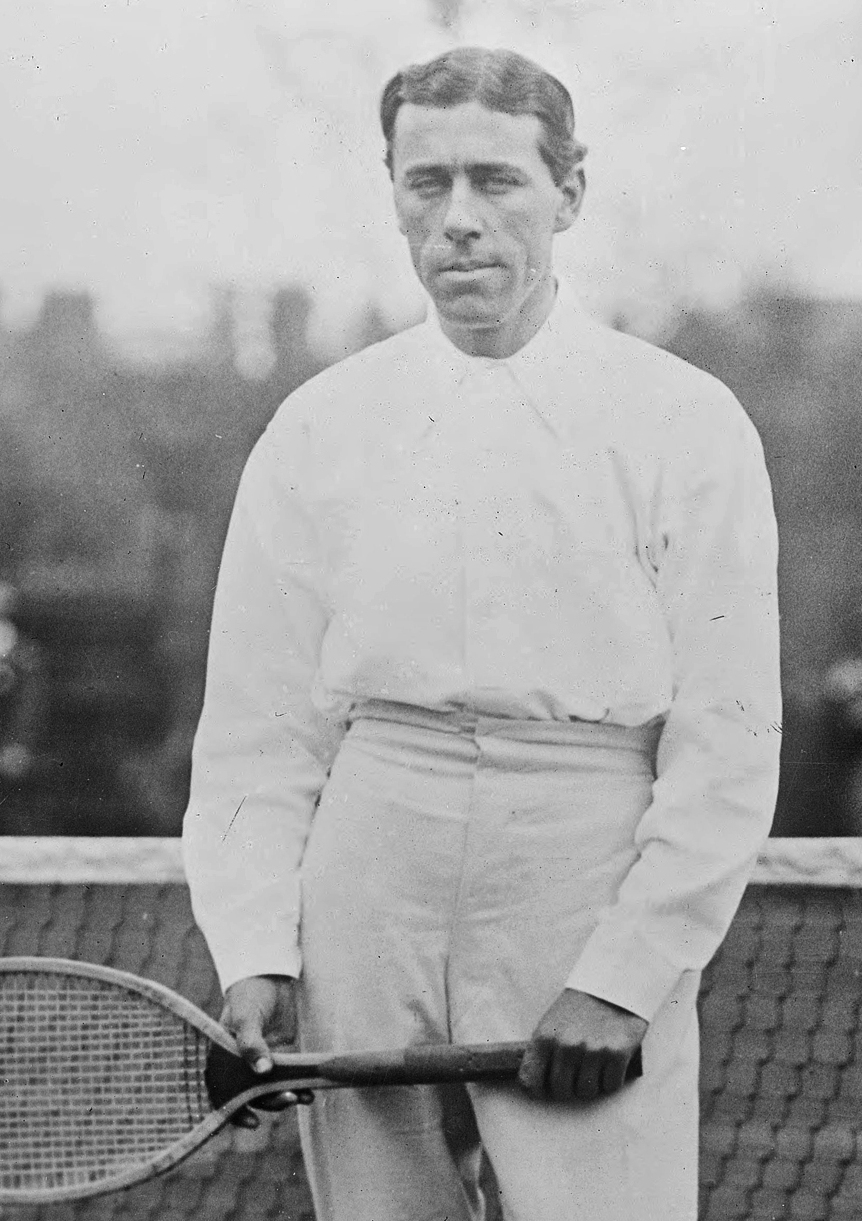
- Full name: Norman Everard Brookes
- Country (sports): Australia
- Born: 14 November 1877 St Kilda, Victoria, Australia
- Died: 28 September 1968 (aged 90) South Yarra, Victoria, Australia
- Height: 1.80 m (5 ft 11 in)
- Retired: 1928
- Plays: Left-handed (one-handed backhand)
- Int. Tennis HoF: 1977 (member page)

Singles
- Career record: 225–52 (81.2%)
- Career titles: 19
- Highest ranking: No. 1 (1907, ITHF)

Grand Slam singles results
- Australian Open: W (1911)
- French Open: 2R (1928)
- Wimbledon: W (1907, 1914)
- US Open: QF (1919)

Grand Slam doubles results
- Australian Open: W (1924)
- Wimbledon: W (1907, 1914)
- US Open: W (1919)

Team competitions
- Davis Cup: W (1907, 1908, 1909, 1911, 1914, 1919)

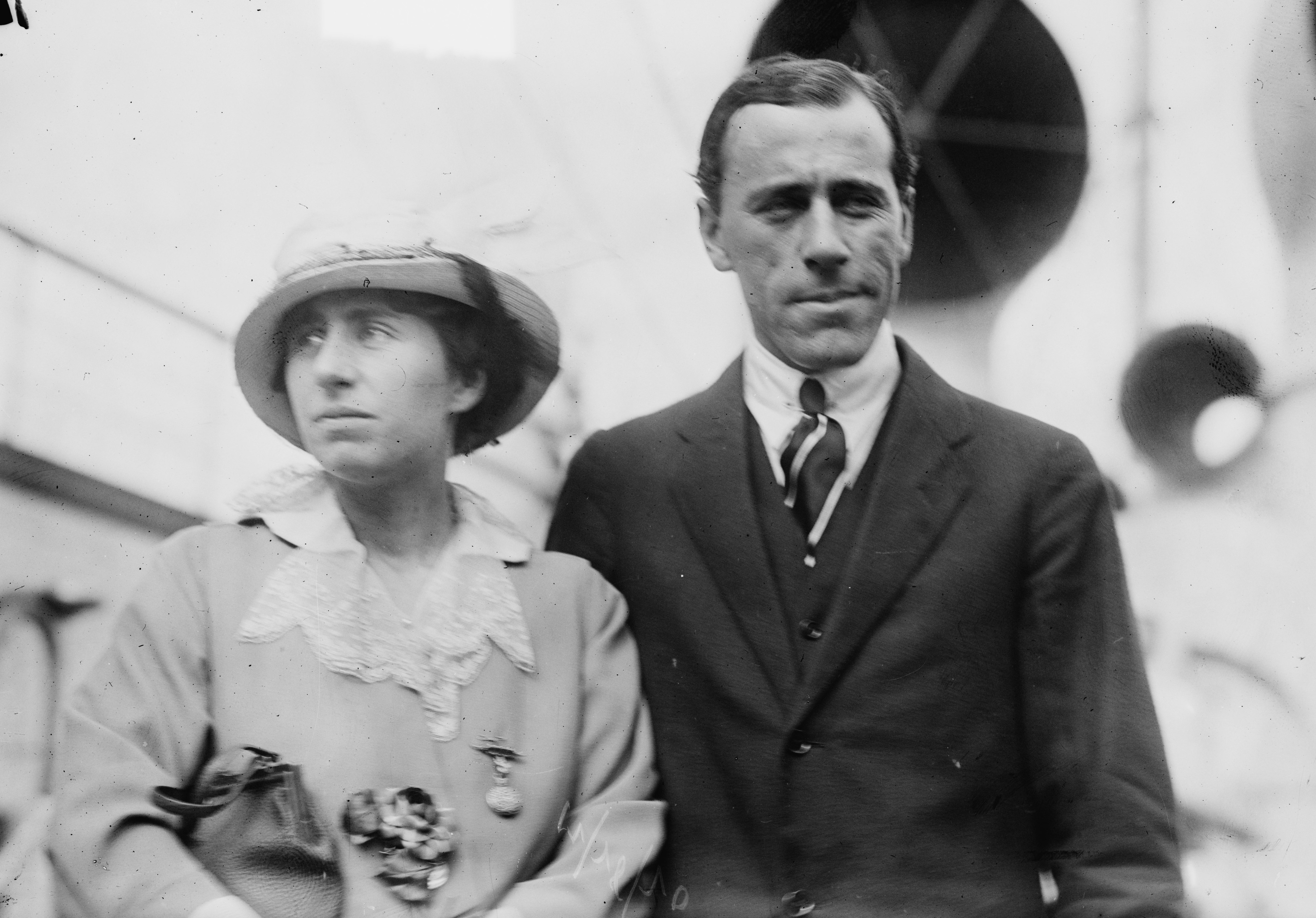
Brookes and his wife, Mabel, in 1914

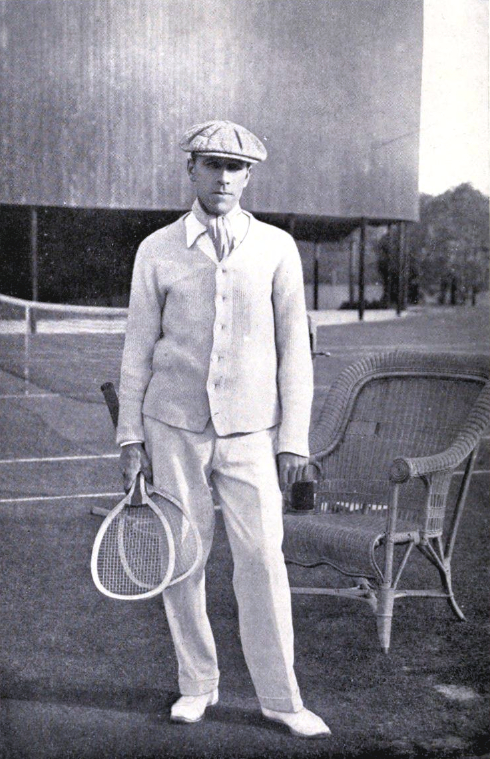
Norman Brookes

Sir Norman Everard Brookes (14 November 1877 – 28 September 1968) was an Australian tennis player. During his career he won three Grand Slam singles titles; Wimbledon in 1907 and 1914 (the first non-British born individual to do so) and the Australasian Championships in 1911. Brookes was part of the Australasian Davis Cup team that won the title on six occasions. The Australian Open men's singles trophy, the Norman Brookes Challenge Cup, is named in his honour. After his active playing career Brookes became president of the Lawn Tennis Association of Australia.

== Early life ==
Brookes was born in the Melbourne suburb of St Kilda as the youngest son to Catherine Margaret (née Robinson) and William Brookes. His father, an English immigrant who emigrated to Australia in 1852 had become rich from gold mining in the Bendigo area. His older brothers, Herbert and Harold, were prominent businessmen. Brookes received a private education at Melbourne Grammar School where he matriculated in 1895. As a schoolboy he excelled in cricket, Australian football and tennis. On leaving school, he went to work as a clerk at Australian Paper Mills, where his father was managing director, and was on the board himself within eight years.

As a youth Brookes played regularly on the court of the family mansion in Queens Road, Melbourne and nearby, at the Lorne St courts, he studied the strokes and tactics of leading players and was coached by Wilberforce Eaves. In 1896 he became a regular player at the Royal South Yarra Tennis Club.

During World War I he served as commissioner of the Australian Red Cross in Egypt.

== Tennis career ==
In 1907 Brookes became the first non-British player and the first left-hander to win the men's singles title at Wimbledon after a straight sets victory in the final against 39-year old Arthur Gore. Brookes intended to defend his Wimbledon title as late as February 1908 but in April cancelled his plans to travel to England due to the ill health of his father (who died in 1910) which meant that Brookes had to spend more time at his father's company Australian Paper Mills. He gave priority to his business endeavors during this time and would not return to Wimbledon until 1914 when he again won the singles title, this time against the title holder Anthony Wilding with whom he also won the Wimbledon doubles title in 1907 and 1914. During these years he also skipped most Australasian Championships with the exception of the 1911 edition which was held in his hometown Melbourne and which he won in the final against Horace Rice. When he did play tennis he focused on the locally held Victorian Championships and the Davis Cup.

Brookes played 39 Davis Cup matches for Australia/New Zealand and the Australian Davis Cup team between 1905 and 1920 and was a member of the winning team in 1907, 1908, 1909, 1914, 1919.

In May 1914 he won the singles title at the Surrey Lawn Championships in Surbiton, defeating Gordon Lowe in the final in five sets.

Brookes was instrumental in the development of Kooyong as a tennis centre. In 1926 he became the first president of the Lawn Tennis Association of Australia, a post he held for the next 29 years until his retirement in June 1955.

== Australian rules football career ==
Brookes was also an Australian rules footballer in his youth, particularly for Melbourne Grammar School. Until 2016 it was believed that he had played two VFL games for St Kilda in 1898; it was actually his brother Harold who had done so.

== Personal life ==
Brookes married 20-year-old Mabel Balcombe Emmerton, the daughter of Harry Emmerton, a solicitor, on 19 April 1911 at St Paul's Cathedral in Melbourne. They had three daughters.

He died in South Yarra, Victoria, in 1968.

== Honours ==
Norman Brookes was created a Knight Bachelor "for public services in the Commonwealth of Australia" in the 1939 Birthday Honours. His wife, Mabel, Lady Brookes was made a Dame Commander of the Order of the British Empire (DBE) in 1955 for "charitable and social welfare services."

The trophy for men's singles at the Australian Open, the Norman Brookes Challenge Cup, is named in his honour.

He was inducted into the International Tennis Hall of Fame in 1977.

In 1981 he was honoured on a postage stamp issued by Australia Post depicting a cartoon image by Tony Rafty.

== Grand Slam finals ==
=== Singles: 5 (3 titles, 2 runners-up) ===
Result	Ref.	Year	Championship	Surface	Opponent	Score
Loss		1905	Wimbledon	Grass	(United Kingdom) Laurence Doherty	6–8, 2–6, 4–6
Win		1907	Wimbledon	Grass	(United Kingdom of Great Britain and Ireland) Arthur Gore	6–4, 6–2, 6–2
Win		1911	Australasian Championships	Grass	(Australia) Horace Rice	6–1, 6–2, 6–3
Win		1914	Wimbledon	Grass	(New Zealand) Anthony Wilding	6–4, 6–4, 7–5
Loss		1919	Wimbledon	Grass	(Australia) Gerald Patterson	3–6, 5–7, 2–6

=== Doubles: 5 (4 titles, 1 runner-up) ===
Result	Ref.	Year	Championship	Surface	Partner	Opponents	Score
Win		1907	Wimbledon	Grass	(New Zealand) Anthony Wilding	(United States) Karl Behr (United States) Beals Wright	6–4, 6–4, 6–2
Loss		1911	Australasian Championships	Grass	(Australia) John Addison	(Australia) Rodney Heath (Australia) Randolph Lycett	2–6, 5–7, 0–6
Win		1914	Wimbledon	Grass	(New Zealand) Anthony Wilding	(United Kingdom of Great Britain and Ireland) Herbert Roper Barrett (United Kingdom of Great Britain and Ireland) Charles Dixon	6–1, 6–1, 5–7, 8–6
Win		1919	U.S. National Championships	Grass	(Australia) Gerald Patterson	(United States) Vincent Richards (United States) Bill Tilden	8–6, 6–3, 4–6, 4–6, 6–2
Win		1924	Australasian Championships	Grass	(Australia) James Anderson	(Australia) Pat O'Hara Wood (Australia) Gerald Patterson	6–2, 6–4, 6–3

== Performance timeline ==
Key
W	F	SF	QF	#R	RR	Q#	DNQ	A	NH

(W) winner; (F) finalist; (SF) semifinalist; (QF) quarterfinalist; (#R) rounds 4, 3, 2, 1; (RR) round-robin stage; (Q#) qualification round; (DNQ) did not qualify; (A) absent; (NH) not held; (SR) strike rate (events won / competed); (W–L) win–loss record.

Events with a challenge round: (W_{C}) won; (CR) lost the challenge round; (F_{A}) all comers' finalist

	1905	1906	1907	1908	1909	1910	1911	1912	1913	1914	1915	1916	1917	1918	1919	1920	1921	1922	1923	1924	1925	1926	1927	1928	SR	W–L	Win %
Grand Slam tournaments																									3 / 8	32–5	86.5
French	Only for French club members										Not held					Only for French club members					A	A	A	2R^{1}	0 / 0	0–0	–
Wimbledon	CR	A	W	A	A	A	A	A	A	W_{C}	Not held				CR	A	A	A	A	4R	A	A	A	A	2 / 5	24–3	88.9
U.S.	A	A	A	A	A	A	A	A	A	1R^{2}	A	A	A	A	QF	A	A	A	A	2R	A	A	A	A	0 / 2	4–2	66.7
Australasian	A	A	A	A	A	A	W	A	A	A	A	Not held			A	A	A	A	A	A	A	A	A	A	1 / 1	4–0	100
Win–loss	7–1		7–0				4–0			7–0					4–2					3–2				0–0			
National representation
Olympics	Not held			A	Not held			A	Not held							A	Not held			2R^{3}	Not held				0 / 0	0–0	–

^{1,2,3} Brookes did not play. His opponent got a walkover.
