= 1907 International Lawn Tennis Challenge =

1907 edition of the International Lawn Tennis Challenge

Details
- Duration: 13 – 24 July 1907
- Edition: 7th
- Teams: 3

Champion
- Winning nation: Australasia

The 1907 International Lawn Tennis Challenge was the seventh edition of what is now known as the Davis Cup. As defending champions, the British Isles team played host to the competition. After several years of more varied competition, only Australasia and the United States would challenge for the cup. Australasia won both ties, and became the third nation to win the cup. The ties were played at Worple Road (the former site of the All England Club) in Wimbledon, London, England from 13–24 July.

== Final ==
Australasia vs. United States

Australasia
3
Worple Road, Wimbledon, London, England
13–16 July 1907
Grass

United States
2

			1	2	3	4	5
1	(Australasia) (United States)	Norman Brookes; Beals Wright	6; 4	6; 4	6; 2
2	(Australasia) (United States)	Anthony Wilding; Karl Behr	1; 6	6; 3	3; 6	7; 5	6; 3
3	(Australasia) (United States)	Norman Brookes / Anthony Wilding; Karl Behr / Beals Wright	6; 3	10; 12	6; 4	2; 6	3; 6
4	(Australasia) (United States)	Norman Brookes; Karl Behr	4; 6	6; 4	6; 1	6; 2
5	(Australasia) (United States)	Anthony Wilding; Beals Wright	8; 6	3; 6	3; 6	5; 7

== Challenge Round ==
British Isles vs. Australasia

British Isles
2
Worple Road, Wimbledon, London, England
20–24 July 1907
Grass

Australasia
3

			1	2	3	4	5
1	(United Kingdom) (Australasia)	Arthur Gore; Norman Brookes	5; 7	1; 6	5; 7
2	(United Kingdom) (Australasia)	Herbert Roper Barrett; Anthony Wilding	6; 1	4; 6	3; 6	5; 7
3	(United Kingdom) (Australasia)	Arthur Gore / Herbert Roper Barrett; Norman Brookes / Anthony Wilding	3; 6	4; 6	7; 5	6; 2	13; 11
4	(United Kingdom) (Australasia)	Arthur Gore; Anthony Wilding	3; 6	6; 3	7; 5	6; 2
5	(United Kingdom) (Australasia)	Herbert Roper Barrett; Norman Brookes	2; 6	0; 6	3; 6
