= 1909 International Lawn Tennis Challenge =

1909 edition of the International Lawn Tennis Challenge

Details
- Duration: 11 September – 30 November 1909
- Edition: 9th
- Teams: 3

Champion
- Winning nation: Australasia

The 1909 International Lawn Tennis Challenge was the ninth edition of what is now known as the Davis Cup. For the second straight year, only the British Isles and the United States would challenge Australasia for the Cup. After defeating the British team in Philadelphia in September, the US team traveled to Sydney, Australia but was defeated again by the Australasian team. The final was played on grass courts at the Double Bay Grounds from 27 November until 30 November 1909.

== Final ==
United States vs. British Isles

United States
5
Germantown Cricket Club, Philadelphia, PA, United States
11–14 September 1909
Grass

British Isles
0

			1	2	3	4	5
1	(United States) (United Kingdom)	William Larned; Charles Dixon	6; 3	6; 2	6; 0
2	(United States) (United Kingdom)	William Clothier; James Cecil Parke	6; 4	6; 3	8; 6
3	(United States) (United Kingdom)	Harold Hackett / Raymond Little; Walter Crawley / James Cecil Parke	3; 6	6; 4	6; 4	4; 6	8; 6
4	(United States) (United Kingdom)	William Larned; James Cecil Parke	6; 3	6; 2	6; 3
5	(United States) (United Kingdom)	William Clothier; Charles Dixon	6; 3	6; 1	6; 4

== Challenge Round ==
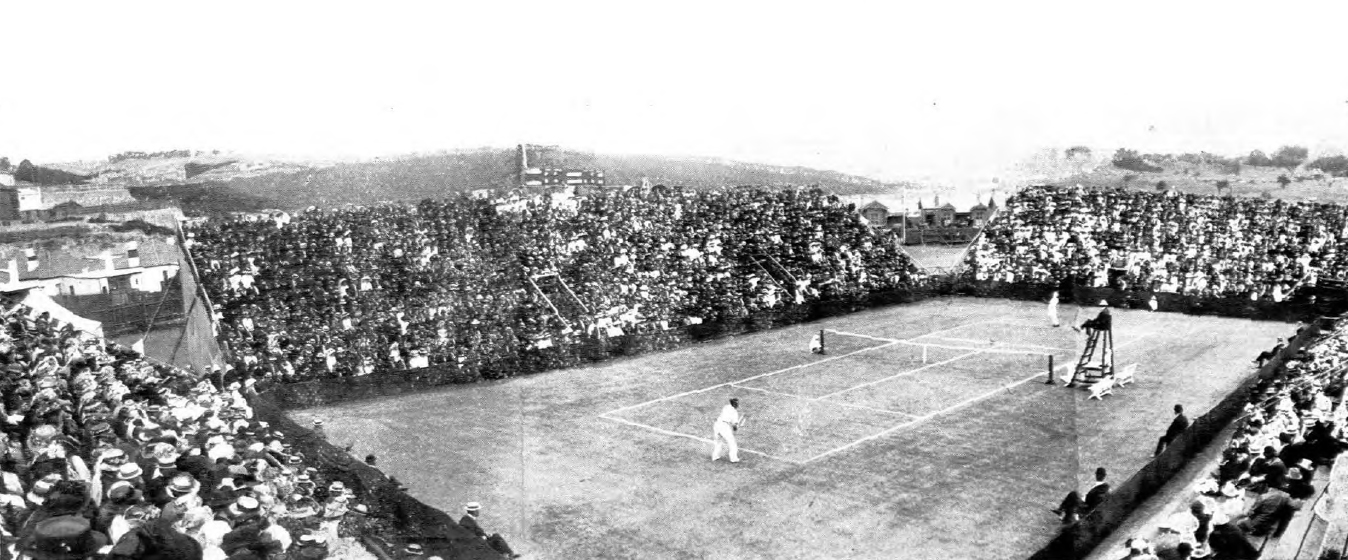
1909 Davis Cup Challenge Round match between Australasia and the United States at the Double Bay Grounds, Sydney, Australia on 27–30 November 1909

Australasia vs. United States

Australasia
5
Double Bay Grounds, Sydney, Australia
27–30 November 1909
Grass

United States
0

			1	2	3	4	5
1	(Australasia) (United States)	Norman Brookes; Maurice McLoughlin	6; 2	6; 2	6; 4
2	(Australasia) (United States)	Anthony Wilding; Melville Long	6; 2	7; 5	6; 1
3	(Australasia) (United States)	Norman Brookes / Anthony Wilding; Melville Long / Maurice McLoughlin	12; 10	9; 7	6; 3
4	(Australasia) (United States)	Norman Brookes; Melville Long	6; 4	7; 5	8; 6
5	(Australasia) (United States)	Anthony Wilding; Maurice McLoughlin	3; 6	8; 6	6; 2	6; 3
