= 1911 International Lawn Tennis Challenge =

1911 edition of the International Lawn Tennis Challenge

Details
- Duration: 9 September 1911 – 3 January 1912
- Edition: 10th
- Teams: 3

Champion
- Winning nation: Australasia

The 1911 International Lawn Tennis Challenge was the tenth edition of what is now known as the Davis Cup, named after the American tennis player Dwight F. Davis. After no country decided to challenge Australasia in 1910, only the British Isles and the United States would challenge for the Cup, for the third straight edition. Also for the third straight edition, the Americans would beat the British to earn the right to play for the Cup, and for the third straight edition, the Aussies would beat the Americans for the title.

For the first time, however, teams were allowed to use substitute players in dead rubbers, with the United States playing Maurice McLoughlin in singles after Australasia had clinched the final. The final also marked the first time a tie was played in New Zealand, when it was played at Lancaster Park in Christchurch. Anthony Wilding, whose home city was Christchurch, and Australian Norman Brookes won the 1907 tournament for Australasia. With Wilding being absent in Europe for the 1911 competition, the chances of the Australasian team were weakened.

Rain delayed the beginning of the games scheduled for 29 December 1911, and the 1911 Davis Cup event was held between 1 and 3 January 1912. Norman Brookes beat Beals Wright in the opening match. Rodney Heath increased the lead for Australasia by beating William Larned. Australasia retained the Davis Cup through a win in the doubles, with Brookes and Alfred Dunlop being successful over Wright and McLoughlin. The fourth match was defaulted by Wright, and Larned stepped aside to give the younger McLoughlin the opportunity to play Brookes. After trailing 2 sets to 1, Brookes came back and won the match, and gave Australasia a clean 5–0 victory.

== Final ==
United States vs. British Isles

United States
4
West Side Tennis Club, New York, NY, United States
9–12 September 1911
Grass

British Isles
1

			1	2	3	4	5
1	(United States) (United Kingdom)	William Larned; Charles Dixon	6; 3	2; 6	6; 3	3; 6	7; 5
2	(United States) (United Kingdom)	Maurice McLoughlin; Arthur Lowe	7; 5	6; 1	4; 6	4; 6	6; 3
3	(United States) (United Kingdom)	Tom Bundy / Raymond Little; Alfred Beamish / Charles Dixon	3; 6	5; 7	4; 6
4	(United States) (United Kingdom)	William Larned; Arthur Lowe	6; 3	1; 6	7; 5	6; 1
5	(United States) (United Kingdom)	Maurice McLoughlin; Charles Dixon	8; 6	3; 6	6; 3	6; 2

== Challenge Round ==
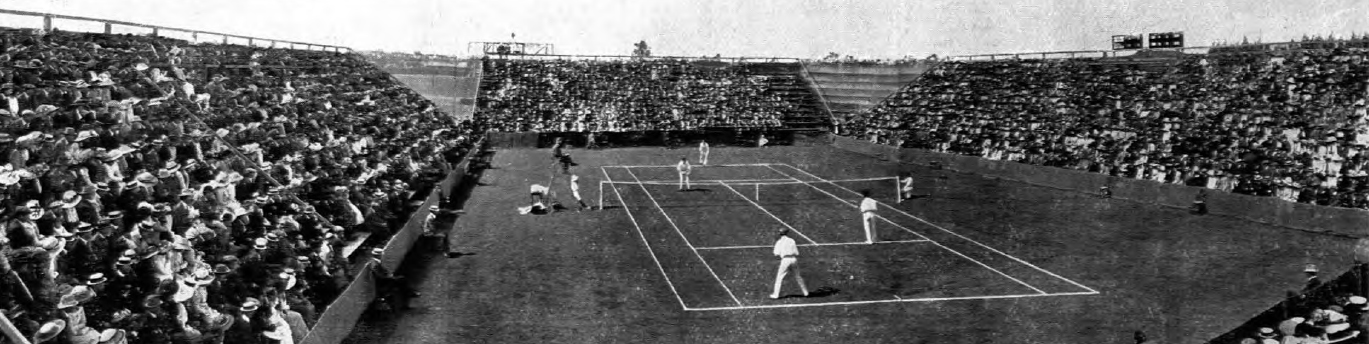
1911 Davis Cup Challenge Round match between Australasia and the United States at Lancaster Park, Christchurch, New Zealand, on 1–3 January 1912

Australasia vs. United States

Australasia
4
Lancaster Park, Christchurch, New Zealand
1–3 January 1912
Grass

United States
0

			1	2	3	4	5
1	(Australasia) (United States)	Norman Brookes; Beals Wright	6; 4	2; 6	6; 3	6; 3
2	(Australasia) (United States)	Rodney Heath; William Larned	2; 6	6; 1	7; 5	6; 2
3	(Australasia) (United States)	Norman Brookes / Alfred Dunlop; Maurice McLoughlin / Beals Wright	6; 4	5; 7	7; 5	6; 4
4	(Australasia) (United States)	Norman Brookes; Maurice McLoughlin	6; 4	3; 6	4; 6	6; 3	6; 4
5	(Australasia) (United States)	Rodney Heath; Beals Wright						not played
