= 2007 Davis Cup World Group =

- Date: 9 February – 2 December
- Edition: 27th

Champions
- United States
- Davis Cup

The World Group was the highest level of Davis Cup competition in 2007. The first-round losers went into the Davis Cup World Group play-offs, and the winners progress to the quarterfinals. The quarterfinalists were guaranteed a World Group spot for 2008.

== Participating teams ==
Participating teams
Argentina	Australia	Austria	Belarus
Belgium	Chile	Croatia	Czech Republic
France	Germany	Romania	Russia
Spain	Sweden	Switzerland	United States

== Draw ==
First round 9–11 February
La Serena, Chile (clay)
1	Russia	3
Chile	2
Clermont-Ferrand, France (indoor hard)
7	France	4
Romania	1
Krefeld, Germany (indoor hard)
3	Croatia	2
Germany	3
Liège, Belgium (indoor clay)
5	Australia	2
Belgium	3
Ostrava, Czech Republic (indoor clay)
Czech Republic	1
6	United States	4
Geneva, Switzerland (indoor carpet)
Switzerland	2
4	Spain	3
Minsk, Belarus (indoor hard)
Sweden	3
8	Belarus	2
Linz, Austria (indoor carpet)
Austria	1
2	Argentina	4

Quarterfinals; 6–8 April
Moscow, Russia (indoor clay)
1	Russia	3
7	France	2
Ostend, Belgium (indoor clay)
Germany	3
Belgium	2
Winston-Salem, United States (indoor hard)
6	United States	4
4	Spain	1
Gothenburg, Sweden (indoor carpet)
Sweden	4
2	Argentina	1

Semifinals; 21–23 September
Moscow, Russia (indoor clay)
1	Russia	3
Germany	2
Gothenburg, Sweden (indoor carpet)
6	United States	4
Sweden	1

Final; 30 November - 2 December
Portland, United States (indoor hard)
1	Russia	1
6	United States	4

== First round ==
=== Chile vs. Russia ===
Chile
2
Estadio Universidad del Mar, La Serena, Chile
9–11 February 2007
Clay

Russia
3

			1	2	3	4	5
1	(Chile) (Russia)	Nicolas Massú; Marat Safin	3; 6	2; 6	2; 6
2	(Chile) (Russia)	Fernando González; Igor Andreev	6; 4	4; 6	3; 6	2; 6
3	(Chile) (Russia)	Fernando González / Nicolas Massú; Igor Andreev / Marat Safin	7^{7} 6^{3}	6; 3	6; 4
4	(Chile) (Russia)	Fernando González; Marat Safin	6; 3	7; 5	6; 4
5	(Chile) (Russia)	Nicolas Massú; Igor Andreev	2; 6	1; 6	7^{7} 6^{1}	4; 6

=== France vs. Romania ===
France
4
Grand Halle d'Auvergne, Clermont-Ferrand, France
9–11 February 2007
Hard (i)

Romania
1

			1	2	3	4	5
1	(France) (Romania)	Richard Gasquet; Victor Hănescu	7; 5	6; 2	6; 2
2	(France) (Romania)	Sébastien Grosjean; Andrei Pavel	4; 6	5; 7	6; 3	6; 1	6; 2
3	(France) (Romania)	Arnaud Clément / Michaël Llodra; Florin Mergea / Horia Tecău	6; 3	5; 7	5; 7	7^{7} 6^{3}	9; 11
4	(France) (Romania)	Richard Gasquet; Andrei Pavel	6; 3	6; 2	7; 5
5	(France) (Romania)	Arnaud Clément; Florin Mergea	7; 5	7^{7} 6^{3}

=== Germany vs. Croatia ===
Germany
3
König Palast, Krefeld, Germany
9–11 February 2007
Hard (i)

Croatia
2

			1	2	3	4	5
1	(Germany) (Croatia)	Tommy Haas; Mario Ančić	2; 6	6; 4	6; 4	6; 4
2	(Germany) (Croatia)	Benjamin Becker; Ivan Ljubičić	7^{7} 6^{4}	4; 6	2; 6	3; 6
3	(Germany) (Croatia)	Michael Kohlmann / Alexander Waske; Mario Ančić / Ivan Ljubičić	6; 4	6; 2	7^{7} 6^{5}
4	(Germany) (Croatia)	Tommy Haas; Ivan Ljubičić	6; 2	7^{9} 6^{7}	6; 4
5	(Germany) (Croatia)	Benjamin Becker; Marin Čilić	4; 6	6; 1	1; 6

=== Belgium vs. Australia ===
Belgium
3
Country Hall du Sart Tilman, Liège, Belgium
9–11 February 2007
Clay (i)

Australia
2

			1	2	3	4	5
1	(Belgium) (Australia)	Kristof Vliegen; Lleyton Hewitt	4; 6	6; 4	3; 6	6; 3	6; 4
2	(Belgium) (Australia)	Olivier Rochus; Chris Guccione	3; 6	7; 5	6; 2	6; 3
3	(Belgium) (Australia)	Olivier Rochus / Kristof Vliegen; Paul Hanley / Lleyton Hewitt	2; 6	4; 6	2; 6
4	(Belgium) (Australia)	Olivier Rochus; Lleyton Hewitt	2; 6	3; 6	7^{7} 6^{4}	6; 3	1; 6
5	(Belgium) (Australia)	Kristof Vliegen; Chris Guccione	6; 4	6; 4	6; 4

=== Czech Republic vs. United States ===
Czech Republic
1
ČEZ Aréna, Ostrava, Czech Republic
9–11 February 2007
Clay (i)

United States
4

			1	2	3	4	5
1	(Czech Republic) (United States)	Ivo Minář; Andy Roddick	4; 6	6; 4	2; 6	3; 6
2	(Czech Republic) (United States)	Tomáš Berdych; James Blake	6; 1	2; 6	7; 5	7; 5
3	(Czech Republic) (United States)	Lukáš Dlouhý / Pavel Vízner; Bob Bryan / Mike Bryan	4; 6	4; 6	4; 6
4	(Czech Republic) (United States)	Tomáš Berdych; Andy Roddick	6; 4	3; 6	2; 6	6^{4} 7^{7}
5	(Czech Republic) (United States)	Lukáš Dlouhý; Bob Bryan	6^{5} 7^{7}	4; 6

=== Switzerland vs. Spain ===
Switzerland
2
Palexpo, Geneva, Switzerland
9–11 February 2007
Carpet (i)

Spain
3

			1	2	3	4	5
1	(Switzerland) (Spain)	Marco Chiudinelli; Fernando Verdasco	6; 3	6; 4	3; 6	7^{7} 6^{2}
2	(Switzerland) (Spain)	Stéphane Bohli; David Ferrer	3; 6	2; 6	2; 6
3	(Switzerland) (Spain)	Yves Allegro / Marco Chiudinelli; Feliciano López / Fernando Verdasco	6^{5} 7^{7}	7^{7} 6^{3}	7^{7} 6^{2}	1; 6	10; 12
4	(Switzerland) (Spain)	Stéphane Bohli; Fernando Verdasco	3; 6	3; 6	2; 6
5	(Switzerland) (Spain)	Marco Chiudinelli; David Ferrer	3; 6	6; 3	6; 3

=== Belarus vs. Sweden ===
Belarus
2
Football Manege, Minsk, Belarus
9–11 February 2007
Hard (i)

Sweden
3

			1	2	3	4	5
1	(Belarus) (Sweden)	Vladimir Voltchkov; Robin Söderling	3; 6	6^{3} 7^{7}	1; 6
2	(Belarus) (Sweden)	Max Mirnyi; Thomas Johansson	4; 6	4; 6	4; 6
3	(Belarus) (Sweden)	Max Mirnyi / Vladimir Voltchkov; Simon Aspelin / Jonas Björkman	7; 5	4; 6	7; 5	6; 3
4	(Belarus) (Sweden)	Max Mirnyi; Robin Söderling	7^{10} 6^{8}	5; 7	7^{10} 6^{8}	6^{3} 7^{7}	3; 6
5	(Belarus) (Sweden)	Vladimir Voltchkov; Thomas Johansson	6; 4	7; 5

=== Austria vs. Argentina ===
Austria
1
Intersport Arena, Linz, Austria
9–11 February 2007
Carpet (i)

Argentina
4

			1	2	3	4	5
1	(Austria) (Argentina)	Stefan Koubek; José Acasuso	6^{6} 7^{8}	1; 6	4; 6
2	(Austria) (Argentina)	Jürgen Melzer; Guillermo Cañas	6^{6} 7^{8}	2; 6	4; 6
3	(Austria) (Argentina)	Julian Knowle / Jürgen Melzer; José Acasuso / Sebastián Prieto	6; 3	6^{2} 7^{7}	6; 1	7; 5
4	(Austria) (Argentina)	Jürgen Melzer; Juan Martín del Potro	6^{4} 7^{7}	6; 3	4; 6	6; 4	2; 6
5	(Austria) (Argentina)	Alexander Peya; Guillermo Cañas	6; 4	1; 6	4; 6

== Quarterfinals ==
=== Russia vs. France ===
Russia
3
Luzhniki Arena, Moscow, Russia
6–8 April 2007
Clay (i)

France
2

			1	2	3	4	5
1	(Russia) (France)	Nikolay Davydenko; Paul-Henri Mathieu	6; 2	2; 6	1; 6	5; 7
2	(Russia) (France)	Mikhail Youzhny; Richard Gasquet	6; 2	6; 3	6^{8} 7^{10}	5; 7	8; 6
3	(Russia) (France)	Igor Andreev / Nikolay Davydenko; Sébastien Grosjean / Michaël Llodra	3; 6	7; 5	6; 3	3; 6	6; 3
4	(Russia) (France)	Igor Andreev; Sébastien Grosjean	5; 7	6; 4	6; 2	3; 6	4; 6
5	(Russia) (France)	Marat Safin; Paul-Henri Mathieu	7^{7} 6^{3}	6; 3	6; 2

=== Belgium vs. Germany ===
Belgium
2
Sleuyter Arena, Ostend, Belgium
6–8 April 2007
Clay (i)

Germany
3

			1	2	3	4	5
1	(Belgium) (Germany)	Kristof Vliegen; Tommy Haas	7^{7} 6^{4}	5; 7	4; 6	2; 6
2	(Belgium) (Germany)	Olivier Rochus; Philipp Kohlschreiber	3; 6	5; 7	6^{4} 7^{7}
3	(Belgium) (Germany)	Christophe Rochus / Olivier Rochus; Michael Kohlmann / Alexander Waske	6; 4	2; 6	3; 6	1; 6
4	(Belgium) (Germany)	Christophe Rochus; Michael Kohlmann	3; 6	6; 4	6; 4
5	(Belgium) (Germany)	Dick Norman; Philipp Kohlschreiber	6; 2	6; 3

=== United States vs. Spain ===
United States
4
Lawrence Joel Veterans Memorial Coliseum, Winston-Salem, United States
6–8 April 2007
Hard (i)

Spain
1

			1	2	3	4	5
1	(United States) (Spain)	James Blake; Tommy Robredo	6; 4	6; 3	6; 4
2	(United States) (Spain)	Andy Roddick; Fernando Verdasco	7^{7} 6^{5}	6; 1	6; 4
3	(United States) (Spain)	Bob Bryan / Mike Bryan; Feliciano López / Fernando Verdasco	7; 5	6; 3	3; 6	7^{7} 6^{5}
4	(United States) (Spain)	Bob Bryan; Tommy Robredo	4; 6	4; 6
5	(United States) (Spain)	James Blake; Feliciano López	6; 3	7^{7} 6^{3}

=== Sweden vs. Argentina ===
Sweden
4
Swedish Exhibition Centre, Gothenburg, Sweden
6–8 April 2007
Carpet (i)

Argentina
1

			1	2	3	4	5
1	(Sweden) (Argentina)	Thomas Johansson; David Nalbandian	6^{3} 7^{7}	7^{7} 6^{2}	6; 2	7^{7} 6^{0}
2	(Sweden) (Argentina)	Robin Söderling; Juan Martín del Potro	7^{7} 6^{4}	7^{7} 6^{4}	6; 4
3	(Sweden) (Argentina)	Jonas Björkman / Thomas Johansson; Guillermo Cañas / David Nalbandian	4; 6	7^{7} 6^{5}	6; 2	6; 3
4	(Sweden) (Argentina)	Jonas Björkman; Sebastián Prieto	6; 1	6; 2
5	(Sweden) (Argentina)	Robert Lindstedt; Juan Martín del Potro	6^{7} 7^{9}	4; 6

== Semifinals ==
=== Russia vs. Germany ===
Russia
3
Olympic Stadium, Moscow, Russia
21–23 September 2007
Clay (i)

Germany
2

			1	2	3	4	5
1	(Russia) (Germany)	Igor Andreev; Tommy Haas	6; 2	6; 2	6; 2
2	(Russia) (Germany)	Nikolay Davydenko; Philipp Kohlschreiber	7^{7} 6^{5}	2; 6	2; 6	6; 4	5; 7
3	(Russia) (Germany)	Dmitry Tursunov / Mikhail Youzhny; Philipp Petzschner / Alexander Waske	3; 6	6; 3	6^{4} 7^{7}	6^{5} 7^{7}
4	(Russia) (Germany)	Mikhail Youzhny; Philipp Petzschner	6; 4	6; 4	3; 6	6; 3
5	(Russia) (Germany)	Igor Andreev; Philipp Kohlschreiber	6; 3	3; 6	6; 0	6; 3

=== Sweden vs. United States ===
Sweden
1
Scandinavium, Gothenburg, Sweden
21–23 September 2007
Carpet (i)

United States
4

			1	2	3	4	5
1	(Sweden) (United States)	Joachim Johansson; Andy Roddick	6^{4} 7^{7}	6^{3} 7^{7}	3; 6
2	(Sweden) (United States)	Thomas Johansson; James Blake	6; 4	6; 2	3; 6	6; 3
3	(Sweden) (United States)	Simon Aspelin / Jonas Björkman; Bob Bryan / Mike Bryan	6^{11} 7^{13}	2; 6	3; 6
4	(Sweden) (United States)	Jonas Björkman; Andy Roddick	2; 6	6^{3} 7^{7}	4; 6
5	(Sweden) (United States)	Simon Aspelin; James Blake	1; 6	3; 6

== Final ==
=== United States vs. Russia ===
United States
4
Memorial Coliseum, Portland, United States
30 November - 2 December 2007
Hard (i)

Russia
1

			1	2	3	4	5
1	(United States) (Russia)	Andy Roddick; Dmitry Tursunov	6; 4	6; 4	6; 2
2	(United States) (Russia)	James Blake; Mikhail Youzhny	6; 3	7^{7} 6^{4}	6^{3} 7^{7}	7^{7} 6^{3}
3	(United States) (Russia)	Bob Bryan / Mike Bryan; Igor Andreev / Nikolay Davydenko	7^{7} 6^{4}	6; 4	6; 2
4	(United States) (Russia)	Bob Bryan; Igor Andreev	3; 6	6^{4} 7^{7}
5	(United States) (Russia)	James Blake; Dmitry Tursunov	1; 6	6; 3	7; 5
