= Russia Davis Cup team =

Davis Cup team representing Russia

Russia
- Captain: Shamil Tarpishchev
- Nations Ranking: 14 ▼6 (21 March 2022) (suspended)
- Highest ranking: 1 ()
- Colors: Red & White
- First year: 1962
- Years played: 57
- Ties played (W–L): 149 (96–53)
- Years in World Group: 28 (36–26)
- Davis Cup titles: 3 (2002, 2006, 2021 (Note: Due to a WADA ban, the team from Russia was not permitted to compete under the name ‘Russia’, or use the Russian flag or anthem in 2021; it won the 2021 Finals as the team of the Russian Tennis Federation (RTF), and used the flag of the RTF.))
- Runners-up: 3 (1994, 1995, 2007)
- Most total wins: Alex Metreveli (80–25)
- Most singles wins: Alex Metreveli (56–14)
- Most doubles wins: Sergei Likhachev (24–9); Alex Metreveli (24–11)
- Best doubles team: Alex Metreveli / Sergei Likhachev (18–7)
- Most ties played: Alex Metreveli (38)
- Most years played: Alex Metreveli (14)

The Russia men's national tennis team represented Russia in Davis Cup tennis competition. It is governed by the Russian Tennis Federation. The team started playing in 1993.

Russia has won the Davis Cup twice, in 2002 and 2006. In addition, the team of the Russian Tennis Federation (RTF) won the Davis Cup in 2021. Russia finished as runner-up three times, in 1994, 1995, and 2007.

Russia was suspended in 2022 after the Russian invasion of Ukraine.

== Last team ==
The following players were called up for the 2021 Davis Cup Finals in November 2021.

Player	Singles Rank	Doubles Rank	First year played	No. of ties	Total Win/Loss	Singles Win/Loss	Doubles Win/Loss
Daniil Medvedev	2	275	2017	7	5–3	5–2	0–1
Andrey Rublev	5	74	2014	16	16–10	9–5	7–5
Aslan Karatsev	18	90	2013	3	1–1	0–1	1–0
Karen Khachanov	29	168	2013	12	9–12	7–7	2–5
Evgeny Donskoy	173	646	2013	9	5–6	3–4	2–2

== History ==
Russia competed in its first Davis Cup in 1962, as the Soviet Union, until 1991, and in 1992 under the name of CIS. Russia played a total of 117 series, of which they won 77 and lost 40. It won the Cup twice – in 2002 and 2006. In 1994, 1995 and 2007 the team played in the final – against Sweden and USA, the latter two.

Russia was the top-ranked country in the Davis Cup standings in 2009, but were upset by Israel in their quarterfinal tie in July 2009, on indoor hard courts at the Nokia Arena in Tel Aviv.

Since their loss against Sweden in the first round of the 2011 Davis Cup, team Russia did not return to the World Group, and after the heavy loss at the 2012 WG Play-offs against Brazil, 0–5, it played in the Europe/Africa Zone Group I. Russia managed to advance to the WG play-offs in 2015, but lost to Italy, 1–4.

With the win over Sweden in the 2016 Europe Zone Group I, Shamil Tarpishchev made a record of 55 Davis Cup wins as team captain.

Year	Name of the country [Ties & results]	Years played	Ties played	Years in World Group	Best result
1900–1917	Russian Empire (Russian Empire)	—	—	—	—
1917–1939	USSR (USSR)	—	—	—	—
1940–1945	World War II				
1946–1961	Didn't compete				
1962–1991	USSR (USSR): 1962 vs Netherlands 5:0; 1962 vs Italy 0:5; 1963 vs Finland 5:0; 1963 vs Chile 4:1; 1963 vs Great Britain 1:4; 1964 vs Morocco 4:1; 1964 vs West Germany 1:4; 1965 vs Rhodesia w/o 1966 vs Italy 1:4; 1967 vs West Germany 3:2; 1967 vs Denmark 3:2; 1967 vs Chile 3:0; 1967 vs Spain 1:4; 1968 vs Greece 4:1; 1968 vs Yugoslavia 5:0; 1968 vs Italy 2:3; 1969 vs Greece 5:0; 1969 vs Canada 4:1; 1969 vs Italy 5:0; 1969 vs Romania 1:4; 1970 vs Hungary 3:2; 1970 vs Monaco 5:0; 1970 vs Czechoslovakia 3:2; 1970 vs West Germany 2:3; 1971 vs Denmark 5:0; 1971 vs Belgium 4:1; 1971 vs Czechoslovakia 1:4; 1972 vs Hungary 3:2; 1972 vs Morocco 5:0; 1972 vs Poland 4:0; 1972 vs Romania 2:3; 1973 vs Hungary 3:2; 1973 vs France 3:2; 1973 vs Romania 2:3; 1974 vs Yugoslavia 3:1; 1974 vs Czechoslovakia 3:2 / 1974 vs India 1:4; 1975 vs Sweden 2:3; 1976 vs Monaco 5:0; 1976 vs West Germany 4:1; 1976 vs Spain 4:1; 1976 vs Hungary 4:1; 1976 vs Chile w/o 1977 vs France w/o 1980 vs Greece 5:0; 1980 vs France 2:3; 1981 vs Belgium 4:1; 1981 vs Austria 4:0; 1981 vs Netherlands 5:0; 1982 vs Sweden 1:4; 1982 vs India 4:1; 1983 vs France 1:4; 1983 vs Czechoslovakia 1:4; 1984 vs Monaco 5:0; 1984 vs Austria 3:2; 1984 vs Israel 3:2; 1985 vs Czechoslovakia 2:3; 1985 vs Argentina 3:2; 1986 vs Yugoslavia 2:3; 1986 vs India 1:4; 1987 vs Turkey 4:1; 1987 vs Netherlands 4:1; 1987 vs Switzerland 2:3; 1988 vs Portugal 5:0; 1988 vs Netherlands 5:0; 1989 vs Czechoslovakia 1:4; 1989 vs Mexico 1:4; 1990 vs Portugal 4:1; 1990 vs Spain 1:4; 1991 vs Hungary 4:1; 1991 vs Switzerland 2:3	29	71 (45–26)	5 (0–5)	Europe Zone winner 1974, 1984, 1988, 1990; World Group 1st Round 1982, 1983, 1985, 1986, 1989
1992	CIS (CIS): 1992 vs Portugal 3:2 / 1992 vs South Korea 5:0	2	2 (2–0)	—	World Group qualifying round winner 1992
1993–	RUS (RUS): 1993 vs Germany 1:4; 1993 vs Cuba 5:0; 1994 vs Australia 4:1; 1994 vs Czech Republic 3:2; 1994 vs Germany 4:1; 1994 vs Sweden 1:4; 1995 vs Belgium 4:1; 1995 vs South Africa 4:1; 1995 vs Germany 3:2; 1995 vs United States 2:3; 1996 vs Italy 2:3; 1996 vs Hungary 4:1; 1997 vs South Africa 1:3; 1997 vs Romania 3:2; 1998 vs United States 2:3; 1998 vs Japan 3:1; 1999 vs Germany 3:2; 1999 vs Slovakia 3:2; 1999 vs Australia 1:4; 2000 vs Belgium 4:1; 2000 vs Spain 1:4; 2001 vs Slovakia 3:2; 2001 vs Sweden 1:4; 2002 vs Switzerland 3:2; 2002 vs Sweden 4:1; 2002 vs Argentina 3:2; 2002 vs France 3:2; 2003 vs Czech Republic 3:2; 2003 vs Argentina 0:5; 2004 vs Belarus 2:3; 2004 vs Thailand 5:0; 2005 vs Chile 4:1; 2005 vs France 3:2; 2005 vs Croatia 2:3; 2006 vs Netherlands 5:0; 2006 vs France 4:1; 2006 vs United States 3:2; 2006 vs Argentina 3:2 / 2007 vs Chile 3:2; 2007 vs France 3:2; 2007 vs Germany 3:2; 2007 vs United States 1:4; 2008 vs Serbia 3:2; 2008 vs Switzerland 3:2; 2008 vs Argentina 2:3; 2009 vs Romania 4:1; 2009 vs Israel 1:4; 2010 vs India 2:3; 2011 vs Sweden 2:3; 2010 vs Brazil 3:2; 2012 vs Austria 2:3; 2012 vs Brazil 0:5; 2013 vs Great Britain 2:3; 2013 vs South Africa 5:0; 2014 vs Poland 2:3; 2014 vs Portugal 4:1; 2015 vs Denmark 4:1; 2015 vs Spain 3:2; 2015 vs Italy 1:4; 2016 vs Sweden 5:0; 2016 vs Netherlands 4:1; 2016 vs Kazakhstan 3:1; 2017 vs Serbia 1:4; 2017 vs Hungary 1:3; 2018 vs Austria 1:3; 2018 vs Belarus 3:2; 2019 vs Switzerland 3:1; 2019 vs Croatia 3:0; 2019 vs Spain 1:2; 2019 vs Serbia 2:1; 2019 vs Canada 1:2; 2021 vs Ecuador 3:0; 2021 vs Spain 2:1; 2021 vs Sweden 2:0; 2021 vs Germany 2:1; 2021 vs Croatia 2:0	28	76 (49–27)	23 (36–21)	World Group winners 2002, 2006, 2021

1962–	Overall	59	149 (96–53)	28 (36–26)	Winner 2002, 2006, 2021

== Recent performances ==
Here is the list of all match-ups since the 1990s.

=== 1990s ===
Year	Competition	Date	Surface	Location	Opponent	Score	Result
1990	Europe/Africa Group I, Second round	4–6 May	clay	Kiev (USSR)	Portugal	4–1	Won
1990	World Group, Relegation play-off	21–23 Sep	carpet	Moscow (USSR)	Spain	1–4	Lost
1991	Europe/Africa Group I, First round	1–3 Feb	carpet	Budapest (HUN)	Hungary	4–1	Won
1991	Europe/Africa Group I, Second round	3–5 May	carpet	Davos (SUI)	Switzerland	2–3	Lost
1992	Europe/Africa Group I, Second round	1–3 May	clay	Porto (POR)	Portugal	3–2	Won
1992	World Group, Relegation play-off	1–3 May	carpet	Moscow (RUS)	South Korea	5–0	Won
1993	World Group, First round	26–28 May	carpet	Moscow (RUS)	Germany	1–4	Lost
1993	World Group, Relegation play-off	24–26 Sep	carpet	Saint Petersburg (RUS)	Cuba	5–0	Won
1994	World Group, First round	25–27 Mar	carpet	Saint Petersburg (RUS)	Australia	4–1	Won
1994	World Group, Quarterfinals	15–17 Jul	carpet	Saint Petersburg (RUS)	Czech Republic	3–2	Won
1994	World Group, Semifinals	23–25 Sep	hard	Hamburg (GER)	Germany	4–1	Won
1994	World Group, Finals	2–4 Dec	carpet	Moscow (RUS)	Sweden	1–4	Runner-up
1995	World Group, First round	3–5 Feb	clay	Antwerp (BEL)	Belgium	4–1	Won
1995	World Group, Quarterfinals	31 Mar–2 Apr	carpet	Moscow (RUS)	South Africa	4–1	Won
1995	World Group, Semifinals	22–24 Sep	clay	Moscow (RUS)	Germany	3–2	Won
1995	World Group, Final	1–3 Dec	clay	Moscow (RUS)	United States	2–3	Runner-up
1996	World Group, First round	9–11 Feb	clay	Rome (ITA)	Italy	2–3	Lost
1996	World Group, Relegation play-off	20–22 Sep	carpet	Moscow (RUS)	Hungary	4–1	Won
1997	World Group, First round	7–9 Feb	hard	Durban (RSA)	South Africa	1–3	Lost
1997	World Group, Relegation play-off	19–21 Sep	carpet	Moscow (RUS)	Romania	3–2	Won
1998	World Group, First round	4–6 Apr	hard	Atlanta (USA)	United States	2–3	Lost
1998	World Group, Relegation play-off	25–27 Sep	hard	Osaka (JPN)	Japan	3–1	Won
1999	World Group, First round	2–4 Apr	carpet	Frankfurt (GER)	Germany	3–2	Won
1999	World Group, Quarterfinals	16–18 Jul	clay	Moscow (RUS)	Slovakia	3–2	Won
1999	World Group, Semifinals	24–26 Sep	grass	Brisbane (AUS)	Australia	1–4	Lost

=== 2000s ===
Year	Competition	Date	Surface	Location	Opponent	Score	Result
2000	World Group, First round	4–6 Feb	carpet	Moscow (RUS)	Belgium	4–1	Won
2000	World Group, Quarterfinals	7–9 Apr	clay	Málaga (ESP)	Spain	1–4	Lost
2001	World Group, First round	9–11 Feb	hard	Bratislava (SVK)	Slovakia	3–2	Won
2001	World Group, Quarterfinals	6–8 Apr	hard	Malmö (SWE)	Sweden	1–4	Lost
2002	World Group, First round	8–10 Feb	clay	Moscow (RUS)	Switzerland	3–2	Won
2002	World Group, Quarterfinals	5–7 Apr	clay	Moscow (RUS)	Sweden	4–1	Won
2002	World Group, Semifinals	20–22 Sep	carpet	Moscow (RUS)	Argentina	3–2	Won
2002	World Group, Final	29 Nov–1 Dec	clay	Paris (FRA)	France	3–2	Winner
2003	World Group, First round	7–9 Feb	clay	Ostrava (CZE)	Czech Republic	3–2	Won
2003	World Group, Quarterfinals	4–6 Apr	clay	Buenos Aires (ARG)	Argentina	0–5	Lost
2004	World Group, First round	6–8 Feb	carpet	Minsk (BLR)	Belarus	2–3	Lost
2004	World Group, Relegation play-off	24–26 Sep	clay	Moscow (RUS)	Thailand	5–0	Won
2005	World Group, First round	4–6 Mar	carpet	Moscow (RUS)	Chile	4–1	Won
2005	World Group, Quarterfinals	15–17 Jul	clay	Moscow (RUS)	France	3–2	Won
2005	World Group, Semifinals	23–25 Sep	carpet	Split (CRO)	Croatia	2–3	Lost
2006	World Group, First round	10–12 Feb	carpet	Amsterdam (NED)	Netherlands	5–0	Won
2006	World Group, Quarterfinals	7–9 Apr	carpet	Pau (FRA)	France	4–1	Won
2006	World Group, Semifinals	22–24 Sep	clay	Moscow (RUS)	United States	3–2	Won
2006	World Group, Final	1–3 Dec	carpet	Moscow (RUS)	Argentina	3–2	Winner
2007	World Group, First round	9–11 Feb	clay	La Serena (CHI)	Chile	3–2	Won
2007	World Group, Quarterfinals	6–8 Mar	clay	Moscow (RUS)	France	3–2	Won
2007	World Group, Semifinals	21–23 Sep	clay	Moscow (RUS)	Germany	3–2	Won
2007	World Group, Final	30 Nov–2 Dec	hard	Oregon (USA)	United States	1–4	Runner-up
2008	World Group, First round	8–10 Feb	hard	Moscow (RUS)	Serbia	3–2	Won
2008	World Group, Quarterfinals	11–13 Apr	clay	Moscow (RUS)	Czech Republic	3–2	Won
2008	World Group, Semifinals	19–21 Sep	clay	Buenos Aires (ARG)	Argentina	2–3	Lost
2009	World Group, First round	6–8 Mar	carpet	Sibiu (ROU)	Romania	4–1	Won
2009	World Group, Quarterfinals	10–12 Jul	hard	Tel Aviv (ISR)	Israel	1–4	Lost

=== 2010s ===
Year	Competition	Date	Surface	Location	Opponent	Score	Result
2010	World Group, First round	5–7 Mar	hard	Moscow (RUS)	India	3–2	Won
2010	World Group, Quarterfinals	9–11 Jul	hard	Moscow (RUS)	Argentina	2–3	Lost
2011	World Group, First round	4–6 Mar	hard	Borås (SWE)	Sweden	2–3	Lost
2011	World Group, Relegation play-off	16–18 Sep	hard	Kazan (RUS)	Brazil	3–2	Won
2012	World Group, First round	10–12 Feb	hard	Wiener Neustadt (AUT)	Austria	2–3	Lost
2012	World Group, Relegation play-off	14–16 Sep	clay	São José do Rio Preto (BRA)	Brazil	0–5	Lost
2013	Europe/Africa Group I, Second round	5–7 Apr	hard	Coventry (GBR)	Great Britain	2–3	Lost
2013	Europe/Africa Group I, Second round play-off	25–27 Oct	hard	Moscow (RUS)	South Africa	5–0	Won
2014	Europe/Africa Group I, First round	31 Jan–2 Feb	hard	Moscow (RUS)	Poland	2–3	Lost
2014	Europe/Africa Group I, Second round play-off	12–14 Sep	hard	Moscow (RUS)	Portugal	4–1	Won
2015	Europe/Africa Group I, First round	6–8 Mar	hard	Novy Urengoy (RUS)	Denmark	4–1	Won
2015	Europe/Africa Group I, Second round	17–19 Jul	hard	Vladivostok (RUS)	Spain	3–2	Won
2015	World Group, Relegation play-off	18–20 Sep	hard	Irkutsk (RUS)	Italy	1–4	Lost
2016	Europe/Africa Group I, First round	4–6 Mar	hard	Kazan (RUS)	Sweden	5–0	Won
2016	Europe/Africa Group I, Second round	15–17 Jul	hard	Moscow (RUS)	Netherlands	4–1	Won
2016	World Group, Relegation play-off	17–18 Sep	hard	Moscow (RUS)	Kazakhstan	3–1	Won
2017	World Group, First Round	3–5 Feb	hard	Niš (SRB)	Serbia	1–4	Lost
2017	World Group, Relegation play-off	15–17 Sep	clay	Budapest (HUN)	Hungary	1–3	Lost
2018	Europe/Africa Group I, Second round	6–7 Apr	hard	Moscow (RUS)	Austria	1–3	Lost
2018	Europe/Africa Group I, First round play-off	14–15 Sep	hard	Moscow (RUS)	Belarus	3–2	Won
2019	Qualifying round	1–3 Feb	hard	Biel/Bienne (SUI)	Switzerland	3–1	Won
2019	Finals	18–24 Nov	hard	Madrid (ESP)	Croatia	3–0	Won
2019	Finals	18–24 Nov	hard	Madrid (ESP)	Spain	1–2	Lost
2019	Finals	18–24 Nov	hard	Madrid (ESP)	Serbia	2–1	Won
2019	Finals	18–24 Nov	hard	Madrid (ESP)	Canada	1–2	Lost
2020–21	Finals	25 Nov–5 Dec	hard	Madrid (ESP)	Ecuador	3–0	Won
2020–21	Finals	25 Nov–5 Dec	hard	Madrid (ESP)	Spain	2–1	Won
2020–21	Finals	25 Nov–5 Dec	hard	Madrid (ESP)	Sweden	2–0	Won
2020–21	Finals	25 Nov–5 Dec	hard	Madrid (ESP)	Germany	2–1	Won
2020–21	Finals	25 Nov–5 Dec	hard	Madrid (ESP)	Croatia	2–0	Winner

== Results ==
Tournament	1962	1963	1964	1965	1966	1967	1968	1969	1970	1971	1972	1973	1974	1975	1976	1977	1978	1979	1980	1981	1982	1983	1984	1985	1986	1987	1988	1989	1990	1991	1992	W–L
World Group	Not Held																			A	1R	1R	A	1R	1R	A	A	1R	A	A	A	0–5
Europe/(Africa) Zone/Group I	2R	QF	2R	1R	A	A	SF	F	F	A	F	A	W	A	A	A	A	A	A	A	A	A	W	A	A	F	W	A	2R	2R	2R (Note: As CIS)	28–8
Europe/(Africa) Zone (B)/Group II	Not Held				1R	F	A	A	A	SF	A	F	A	SF	W	SF	A	A	QF	W	A	A	A	A	A	A	A	A	A	A	A	15–7
Europe/Africa Group III	Not Held																														A	0–0

Tournament	1993	1994	1995	1996	1997	1998	1999	2000	2001	2002	2003	2004	2005	2006	2007	2008	2009	2010	2011	2012	2013	2014	2015	2016	2017	2018	2019	W–L
World Group	1R	F	F	1R	1R	1R	SF	QF	QF	W	QF	1R	SF	W	F	SF	QF	QF	1R	1R	A	A	A	A	1R	A	SF	30–20
World Group play-offs (qualifying round)	W	A	A	W	W	W	A	A	A	A	A	W	A	A	A	A	A	A	W	L	A	A	L	W	L	A	W	8–3
Europe/Africa Zone Group I	A	A	A	A	A	A	A	A	A	A	A	A	A	A	A	A	A	A	A	A	2R	1R	2R	2R	A	1R PO	A	6–3
Europe/Africa Zone Group II	A	A	A	A	A	A	A	A	A	A	A	A	A	A	A	A	A	A	A	A	A	A	A	A	A	A	A	0–0
Europe/(Africa) Zone Group III	A	A	A	A	A	A	A	A	A	A	A	A	A	A	A	A	A	A	A	A	A	A	A	A	A	A	A	0–0
Europe/Africa Zone Group IV	Not Held				A	A	A	A	A	A	A	A	A	A	A	A	A	Not Held									A	0–0

Tournament	2020–21	2022	W–L
Finals	W (Note: As RTF)		5–0
World Group I	A	A	0–0
World Group II	A	A	0–0
Europe Zone III	A	A	0–0
Europe Zone IV	A	A	0–0

== See also ==
- Davis Cup
- Russia Billie Jean King Cup team
- Russia at the Hopman Cup
