= 2000 Davis Cup Asia/Oceania Zone Group IV =

International tennis competition

The Asia/Oceania Zone was one of the three zones of the regional Davis Cup competition in 2000.

In the Asia/Oceania Zone there were four different tiers, called groups, in which teams competed against each other to advance to the upper tier. The top two teams in Group IV advanced to the Asia/Oceania Zone Group III in 2001. All other teams remained in Group IV.

== Participating nations ==
- Bahrain
- Brunei
- Fiji
- Jordan
- Oman
- Saudi Arabia
- United Arab Emirates

=== Draw ===
- Venue: Al Hussein Sports City, Amman, Jordan
- Date: 24–30 April

	KSA	BHR	OMA	JOR	UAE	FIJ	BRU	RR; W–L	Match; W–L	Set; W–L	Standings
Saudi Arabia		2–1	1–2	2–1	2–1	3–0	3–0	5–1	13–5 (72%)	30–12 (71%)	1
Bahrain	1–2		2–1	2–1	2–1	3–0	3–0	5–1	13–5 (72%)	27–13 (68%)	2
Oman	2–1	1–2		3–0	1–2	3–0	3–0	4–2	13–5 (72%)	28–13 (68%)	3
Jordan	1–2	1–2	0–3		2–1	2–1	2–1	3–3	8–10 (44%)	17–23 (43%)	4
United Arab Emirates	1–2	1–2	2–1	1–2		1–2	3–0	2–4	9–9 (50%)	20–18 (53%)	5
Fiji	0–3	0–3	0–3	1–2	2–1		3–0	2–4	6–12 (33%)	13–24 (35%)	6
Brunei	0–3	0–3	0–3	1–2	0–3	0–3		0–6	1–17 (6%)	2–34 (6%)	7

- Saudi Arabia and Bahrain promoted to Group III in 2001.

== Results ==
=== Bahrain vs. United Arab Emirates ===
Bahrain
2
Al Hussein Sports City, Amman, Jordan
24 April 2000

United Arab Emirates
1

			1	2	3
1	(Bahrain) (United Arab Emirates)	Esam Abdulaal; Mahmoud Nader Al-Blooshi	6; 3	6; 1
2	(Bahrain) (United Arab Emirates)	Abdul-Rahman Shehab; Omar Alawadhi	6; 4	7; 5
3	(Bahrain) (United Arab Emirates)	Nader Abdul-Aal / Fahad Sarwani; Omar Alawadhi / Mahmoud Nader Al-Blooshi	6^{6} 7^{8}	3; 6

=== Oman vs. Fiji ===
Oman
3
Al Hussein Sports City, Amman, Jordan
24 April 2000

Fiji
0

			1	2	3
1	(Oman) (Fiji)	Khalid Al-Nabhani; Hitesh Morriswala	6; 2	7; 5
2	(Oman) (Fiji)	Mudrik Al-Rawahi; Sanjeev Tikaram	6; 4	7^{9} 6^{7}
3	(Oman) (Fiji)	Khalid Al-Nabhani / Mudrik Al-Rawahi; Diva Gawander / Mohammed Jannif	6; 0	6; 3

=== Jordan vs. Brunei ===
Jordan
2
Al Hussein Sports City, Amman, Jordan
24 April 2000

Brunei
1

			1	2	3
1	(Jordan) (Brunei)	Ahmed Ibrahim Ahmad Alhadid; Billy Kee-loong Wong	6; 0	6; 3
2	(Jordan) (Brunei)	Abdullah Fadda; Ismasufian Ibrahim	6; 4	6; 1
3	(Jordan) (Brunei)	Amar Al-Maytah / Ahmed Ibrahim Ahmad Alhadid; Hardiyamin Baharuddin / Ismasufian Ibrahim	3; 6	3; 6

=== Saudi Arabia vs. Oman ===
Saudi Arabia
1
Al Hussein Sports City, Amman, Jordan
25 April 2000

Oman
2

			1	2	3
1	(Saudi Arabia) (Oman)	Bader Mohammed Almuqail; Khalid Al-Nabhani	6; 4	6; 4
2	(Saudi Arabia) (Oman)	Abdullah Nour; Mudrik Al-Rawahi	6; 4	3; 6	4; 6
3	(Saudi Arabia) (Oman)	Baqer Abu Khulaif / Bader Mohammed Almuqail; Khalid Al-Nabhani / Mudrik Al-Rawahi	3; 6	6^{3} 7^{7}

=== Bahrain vs. Fiji ===
Bahrain
3
Al Hussein Sports City, Amman, Jordan
25 April 2000

Fiji
0

			1	2	3
1	(Bahrain) (Fiji)	Esam Abdulaal; Hitesh Morriswala	6; 2	6; 0
2	(Bahrain) (Fiji)	Abdul-Rahman Shehab; Sanjeev Tikaram	6; 2	6; 0
3	(Bahrain) (Fiji)	Esam Abdulaal / Nader Abdul-Aal; Hitesh Morriswala / Sanjeev Tikaram	6; 4	6; 0

=== Jordan vs. United Arab Emirates ===
Jordan
2
Al Hussein Sports City, Amman, Jordan
25 April 2000

United Arab Emirates
1

			1	2	3
1	(Jordan) (United Arab Emirates)	Ahmed Ibrahim Ahmad Alhadid; Mahmoud Nader Al-Blooshi	3; 6	4; 4		retired
2	(Jordan) (United Arab Emirates)	Abdullah Fadda; Omar Alawadhi	3; 6	6; 2	2; 6
3	(Jordan) (United Arab Emirates)	Ahmed Ibrahim Ahmad Alhadid / Abdullah Fadda; Omar Alawadhi / Abdullah Kamber	7^{7} 6^{4}	3; 6	7; 5

=== Saudi Arabia vs. Brunei ===
Saudi Arabia
3
Al Hussein Sports City, Amman, Jordan
26 April 2000

Brunei
0

			1	2	3
1	(Saudi Arabia) (Brunei)	Bader Mohammed Almuqail; Billy Kee-loong Wong	6; 0	6; 0
2	(Saudi Arabia) (Brunei)	Abdullah Nour; Ismasufian Ibrahim	6; 1	6; 4
3	(Saudi Arabia) (Brunei)	Baqer Abu Khulaif / Bader Mohammed Almuqail; Hardiyamin Baharuddin / Ismasufian Ibrahim	6; 3	6; 2

=== Oman vs. Jordan ===
Oman
3
Al Hussein Sports City, Amman, Jordan
26 April 2000

Jordan
0

			1	2	3
1	(Oman) (Jordan)	Khalid Al-Nabhani; Amar Al-Maytah	7; 5	6; 2
2	(Oman) (Jordan)	Mudrik Al-Rawahi; Ahmed Ibrahim Ahmad Alhadid	4; 6	6; 4	7; 5
3	(Oman) (Jordan)	Khalid Al-Nabhani / Mudrik Al-Rawahi; Abdullah Fadda / Tareq Talal Shkakwa	6; 2	6; 2

=== Fiji vs. United Arab Emirates ===
Fiji
2
Al Hussein Sports City, Amman, Jordan
26 April 2000

United Arab Emirates
1

			1	2	3
1	(Fiji) (United Arab Emirates)	Hitesh Morriswala; Omar Alawadhi	2; 6	3; 6
2	(Fiji) (United Arab Emirates)	Sanjeev Tikaram; Othman Al-Ulama	6; 1	7; 5
3	(Fiji) (United Arab Emirates)	Hitesh Morriswala / Sanjeev Tikaram; Othman Al-Ulama / Omar Alawadhi	6; 4	6; 3

=== Saudi Arabia vs. Jordan ===
Saudi Arabia
2
Al Hussein Sports City, Amman, Jordan
27 April 2000

Jordan
1

			1	2	3
1	(Saudi Arabia) (Jordan)	Bader Mohammed Almuqail; Amar Al-Maytah	6; 1	6; 1
2	(Saudi Arabia) (Jordan)	Abdullah Nour; Ahmed Ibrahim Ahmad Alhadid	6; 3	4; 6	4; 6
3	(Saudi Arabia) (Jordan)	Baqer Abu Khulaif / Bader Mohammed Almuqail; Ahmed Ibrahim Ahmad Alhadid / Abdullah Fadda	6; 0	4; 6	6; 0

=== Bahrain vs. Oman ===
Bahrain
2
Al Hussein Sports City, Amman, Jordan
27 April 2000

Oman
1

			1	2	3
1	(Bahrain) (Oman)	Esam Abdulaal; Khalid Al-Nabhani	4; 6	6; 3	6; 1
2	(Bahrain) (Oman)	Abdul-Rahman Shehab; Mudrik Al-Rawahi	1; 6	7^{7} 6^{5}	3; 6
3	(Bahrain) (Oman)	Esam Abdulaal / Abdul-Rahman Shehab; Khalid Al-Nabhani / Mudrik Al-Rawahi	6; 3	4; 6	6; 2

=== United Arab Emirates vs. Brunei ===
United Arab Emirates
3
Al Hussein Sports City, Amman, Jordan
27 April 2000

Brunei
0

			1	2	3
1	(United Arab Emirates) (Brunei)	Abdullah Kamber; Sharill Teo	6; 1	6; 2
2	(United Arab Emirates) (Brunei)	Omar Alawadhi; Ismasufian Ibrahim	6; 2	6; 4
3	(United Arab Emirates) (Brunei)	Omar Alawadhi / Abdullah Kamber; Hardiyamin Baharuddin / Ismasufian Ibrahim	6; 0	6; 3

=== Saudi Arabia vs. United Arab Emirates ===
Saudi Arabia
2
Al Hussein Sports City, Amman, Jordan
28 April 2000

United Arab Emirates
1

			1	2	3
1	(Saudi Arabia) (United Arab Emirates)	Bader Mohammed Almuqail; Abdullah Kamber	6; 0	6; 1
2	(Saudi Arabia) (United Arab Emirates)	Abdullah Nour; Omar Alawadhi	6; 2	4; 6	1; 6
3	(Saudi Arabia) (United Arab Emirates)	Omar Althagib / Bader Mohammed Almuqail; Omar Alawadhi / Abdullah Kamber	6; 2	6; 2

=== Bahrain vs. Jordan ===
Bahrain
2
Al Hussein Sports City, Amman, Jordan
28 April 2000

Jordan
1

			1	2	3
1	(Bahrain) (Jordan)	Esam Abdulaal; Tareq Talal Shkakwa	6; 0	6; 0
2	(Bahrain) (Jordan)	Abdul-Rahman Shehab; Ahmed Ibrahim Ahmad Alhadid	3; 6	3; 6
3	(Bahrain) (Jordan)	Esam Abdulaal / Abdul-Rahman Shehab; Ahmed Ibrahim Ahmad Alhadid / Abdullah Fadda	6; 1	6; 3

=== Fiji vs. Brunei ===
Fiji
3
Al Hussein Sports City, Amman, Jordan
28 April 2000

Brunei
0

			1	2	3
1	(Fiji) (Brunei)	Hitesh Morriswala; Billy Kee-loong Wong	6; 1	6; 1
2	(Fiji) (Brunei)	Sanjeev Tikaram; Ismasufian Ibrahim	6; 1	6; 3
3	(Fiji) (Brunei)	Mohammed Jannif / Hitesh Morriswala; Sharill Teo / Billy Kee-loong Wong	6; 2	6; 3

=== Saudi Arabia vs. Fiji ===
Saudi Arabia
3
Al Hussein Sports City, Amman, Jordan
29 April 2000

Fiji
0

			1	2	3
1	(Saudi Arabia) (Fiji)	Bader Mohammed Almuqail; Mohammed Jannif	6; 1	6; 1
2	(Saudi Arabia) (Fiji)	Abdullah Nour; Sanjeev Tikaram	6; 4	4; 6	6; 4
3	(Saudi Arabia) (Fiji)	Omar Althagib / Bader Mohammed Almuqail; Mohammed Jannif / Hitesh Morriswala	6; 4	7^{7} 6^{3}

=== Bahrain vs. Brunei ===
Bahrain
3
Al Hussein Sports City, Amman, Jordan
29 April 2000

Brunei
0

			1	2	3
1	(Bahrain) (Brunei)	Fahad Sarwani; Sharill Teo	6; 1	6; 0
2	(Bahrain) (Brunei)	Esam Abdulaal; Billy Kee-loong Wong	6; 0	6; 0
3	(Bahrain) (Brunei)	Nader Abdul-Aal / Abdul-Rahman Shehab; Sharill Teo / Billy Kee-loong Wong	6; 0	6; 0

=== Oman vs. United Arab Emirates ===
Oman
1
Al Hussein Sports City, Amman, Jordan
29 April 2000

United Arab Emirates
2

			1	2	3
1	(Oman) (United Arab Emirates)	Khalid Al-Nabhani; Omar Alawadhi	4; 6	6^{2} 7^{7}
2	(Oman) (United Arab Emirates)	Mudrik Al-Rawahi; Othman Al-Ulama	6; 3	6; 4
3	(Oman) (United Arab Emirates)	Khalid Al-Nabhani / Mudrik Al-Rawahi; Othman Al-Ulama / Omar Alawadhi	6^{3} 7^{7}	4; 6

=== Saudi Arabia vs. Bahrain ===
Saudi Arabia
2
Al Hussein Sports City, Amman, Jordan
30 April 2000

Bahrain
1

			1	2	3
1	(Saudi Arabia) (Bahrain)	Bader Mohammed Almuqail; Esam Abdulaal	6; 3	6; 3
2	(Saudi Arabia) (Bahrain)	Abdullah Nour; Abdul-Rahman Shehab	7^{8} 6^{6}	6; 4
3	(Saudi Arabia) (Bahrain)	Baqer Abu Khulaif / Omar Althagib; Nader Abdul-Aal / Fahad Sarwani	2; 6	7^{7} 6^{1}	1; 6

=== Oman vs. Brunei ===
Oman
3
Al Hussein Sports City, Amman, Jordan
30 April 2000

Brunei
0

			1	2	3
1	(Oman) (Brunei)	Khalid Al-Nabhani; Hardiyamin Baharuddin	6; 1	6; 0
2	(Oman) (Brunei)	Mudrik Al-Rawahi; Billy Kee-loong Wong	6; 0	6; 1
3	(Oman) (Brunei)	Khalid Al-Nabhani / Khalid Al-Nabhani; Ismasufian Ibrahim / Billy Kee-loong Wong	6; 3	6; 1

=== Jordan vs. Fiji ===
Jordan
2
Al Hussein Sports City, Amman, Jordan
30 April 2000

Fiji
1

			1	2	3
1	(Jordan) (Fiji)	Ahmed Ibrahim Ahmad Alhadid; Hitesh Morriswala	6; 1	6; 2
2	(Jordan) (Fiji)	Abdullah Fadda; Sanjeev Tikaram	4; 6	5; 7
3	(Jordan) (Fiji)	Ahmed Ibrahim Ahmad Alhadid / Abdullah Fadda; Mohammed Jannif / Sanjeev Tikaram	6; 4	7^{8} 6^{6}
