= Nodar Itonishvili =

Georgian tennis player

- Country (sports): Georgia
- Born: 14 November 1987 (age 38)
- Plays: Right-handed
- Prize money: $4,139

Singles
- Career record: 0–4
- Career titles: 0; 0 Challenger, 0 Futures
- Highest ranking: No. 1,058 (18 August 2008)

Doubles
- Career record: 0–3
- Career titles: 0
- Highest ranking: No. 1,129 (29 April 2013)

Team competitions
- Davis Cup: 0–9
- Last updated on: 1 July 2019.

Nodar Itonishvili (born 14 November 1987) is a former Georgian tennis player.

Itonishvili has a career-high ATP singles ranking of 1,058, achieved on 18 August 2008. He also has a career-high ATP doubles ranking of 1,129, achieved on 29 April 2013.

Itonishvili has represented Georgia at Davis Cup, where he has a win-loss record of 0–9.

== Future and Challenger finals ==
=== Doubles: 2 (0–2) ===
Legend
ATP Challengers 0 (0–0)
ITF Futures 2 (0–2)

Titles by surface
Hard (0–0)
Clay (0–2)
Grass (0–0)
Carpet (0–0)

Result	W–L	Date	Tournament	Tier	Surface	Partner	Opponents	Score
Loss	0–1	Nov 2007	Barcelona, Spain F42	Futures	Clay	(Morocco) Younès Rachidi	(Argentina) Diego Álvarez (Greece) Alexandros Jakupovic	3–6, 3–6
Loss	0–2	Sep 2012	Tbilisi, Georgia F2	Futures	Clay	(Georgia (country)) David Kvernadze	(Ukraine) Vladyslav Manafov (Belarus) Yaraslav Shyla	2–6, 4–6

== Davis Cup ==
=== Participations: (0–9) ===
Group membership World Group (0–0) WG Play-off (0–0) Group I (0–4) Group II (0–4) Group III (0–1) Group IV (0–0)	Matches by surface Hard (0–3) Clay (0–6) Grass (0–0) Carpet (0–0)	Matches by type Singles (0–6) Doubles (0–3)

- ▲ ▼ indicates the outcome of the Davis Cup match followed by the score, date, place of event, the zonal classification and its phase, and the court surface.

Rubber outcome	No.	Rubber	Match type (partner if any)	Opponent nation	Opponent player(s)	Score
▼1–4; 11–13 April 2008; Sibamac Arena, Bratislava, Slovakia; Europe/Africa Zone Group I Second round; Hard (indoor) surface
Defeat	1	II	Singles	Slovakia	Dominik Hrbatý	4–6, 4–6, 4–6
Defeat	2	III	Doubles (with Irakli Labadze)	Slovakia	Michal Mertiňák / Filip Polášek	3–6, 3–6, 5–7
Defeat	3	IV	Singles	Slovakia	Lukáš Lacko	3–6, 1–6, 3–6
▼0–3; 19–21 September 2008; Republic Olympic Training Center for Tennis, Minsk, Belarus; Europe/Africa Zone Group I Relegation play-off; Hard surface
Defeat	4	IV	Singles (dead rubber)	Belarus	Uladzimir Ignatik	4–6 ABN
▼0–5; 10–12 July 2009; El Gezera Sporting Club, Cairo, Egypt; Europe/Africa Zone Group II Relegation play-off; Clay surface
Defeat	5	II	Singles	Egypt	Sherif Sabry	2–6, 4–6, 0–6
Defeat	6	III	Doubles (with George Khrikadze)	Egypt	Karim Maamoun / Sherif Sabry	0–6, 2–6, 1–6
Defeat	7	IV	Singles (dead rubber)	Egypt	Mohamed Mamoun	1–6, 3–6
▼1–2; 13 May 2010; Olympic Tennis Center, Marousi, Greece; Europe Zone Group III Round robin; Hard surface
Defeat	8	II	Singles	Luxembourg	Gilles Müller	2–6, 1–6
▲3–2; 15–17 July 2016; Mziuri Tennis Club, Tbilisi, Georgia; Europe/Africa Zone Group II Relegation play-off; Hard surface
Defeat	9	III	Doubles (with Nikoloz Basilashvili)	Zimbabwe	Benjamin Lock / Courtney John Lock	6–3, 6–3, 6–7^{(6–8)}, 4–6, 4–6
