= 2008 Davis Cup Europe/Africa Zone Group I =

International tennis competition

The European and African Zone was one of the three regional Davis Cup competition zones in 2008.

In the European and African Zone, there are four different groups in which teams compete against each other to advance to the next group.

== Participating teams ==
- Belarus
- Croatia
- Georgia
- Italy
- Latvia
- Macedonia
- Netherlands
- Slovakia
- Switzerland
- Poland

== Draw ==
Second Round Play-offs
Montecatini, Italy (clay)
Italy	3
Latvia	2
Minsk, Belarus (hard)
3	Belarus	3
Georgia	0

First Round Play-offs
Italy
bye
bye
Latvia
Minsk, Belarus (hard)
Poland	4
3	Belarus	1
Georgia
bye

First round
1	Croatia
bye
Italy
bye
4	Netherlands
bye
Skopje, Macedonia (indoor clay)
Latvia	1
Macedonia	4
Kreuzlingen, Switzerland (indoor hard)
Switzerland	4
Poland	1
bye
3	Belarus
bye
Georgia
bye
2	Slovakia

Second round
Dubrovnik, Croatia (indoor hard)
1	Croatia	3
Italy	2
Skopje, Macedonia (clay)
4	Netherlands	4
Macedonia	1
Minsk, Belarus (indoor carpet)
Switzerland	4
3	Belarus	1
Bratislava, Slovakia (indoor clay)
Georgia	1
2	Slovakia	4

- Latvia and Georgia relegated to Group II in 2009.
- Croatia, Netherlands, Switzerland, and Slovakia advance to World Group Play-off.

== First Round Matches ==
=== Latvia vs. Macedonia ===
Latvia
1
Jane Sandanski Hall, Skopje, Macedonia
8–10 February 2008
clay (indoor)

Macedonia
4

			1	2	3	4	5
1	(Latvia) (North Macedonia)	Ernests Gulbis; Lazar Magdinčev	6; 2	4; 6	2; 6	6; 1	2; 6
2	(Latvia) (North Macedonia)	Andis Juška; Predrag Rusevski	6^{3} 7^{7}	3; 6	5; 7
3	(Latvia) (North Macedonia)	Andis Juška / Deniss Pavlovs; Lazar Magdinčev / Predrag Rusevski	1; 6	3; 6	0; 6
4	(Latvia) (North Macedonia)	Karlis Lejnieks; Ilija Martinoski	3; 6	4; 6
5	(Latvia) (North Macedonia)	Deniss Pavlovs; Tomislav Jotovski	6; 2	6; 2

=== Switzerland vs. Poland ===
Switzerland
4
Bodensee-Arena, Kreuzlingen, Switzerland
8–10 February 2008
hard (indoor)

Poland
1

			1	2	3	4	5
1	(Switzerland) (Poland)	Stéphane Bohli; Dawid Olejniczak	6; 4	7^{7} 6^{3}	6; 4
2	(Switzerland) (Poland)	Stanislas Wawrinka; Blazej Koniusz	6; 3	7^{7} 6^{5}	6; 3
3	(Switzerland) (Poland)	Yves Allegro / Michael Lammer; Mariusz Fyrstenberg / Marcin Matkowski	6; 4	6; 3	2; 6	6; 3
4	(Switzerland) (Poland)	Michael Lammer; Dawid Olejniczak	6; 3	2; 2				retired
5	(Switzerland) (Poland)	Stéphane Bohli; Tomislav Jotovski	2; 1					retired

== Second Round Matches ==
=== Croatia vs. Italy ===
Croatia
3
Sportska Dvorana, Dubrovnik, Croatia
11–13 April 2008
hard (indoor)

Italy
2

			1	2	3	4	5
1	(Croatia) (Italy)	Ivo Karlović; Simone Bolelli	6^{7} 7^{9}	3; 6	4; 6
2	(Croatia) (Italy)	Mario Ančić; Andreas Seppi	6; 2	6; 4	7; 5
3	(Croatia) (Italy)	Mario Ančić / Marin Čilić; Simone Bolelli / Potito Starace	7^{7} 6^{3}	6; 4	1; 6	6; 3
4	(Croatia) (Italy)	Marin Čilić; Andreas Seppi	7^{9} 6^{7}	4; 6	4; 6	7^{7} 6^{3}	1; 6
5	(Croatia) (Italy)	Mario Ančić; Simone Bolelli	6; 4	6; 4	6; 2

=== Netherlands vs. Macedonia ===
Netherlands
4
Tennis Club JUG, Skopje, Macedonia
11–13 April 2008
clay (outdoor)

Macedonia
1

			1	2	3	4	5
1	(Netherlands) (North Macedonia)	Robin Haase; Lazar Magdinčev	6; 3	6; 2	6; 2
2	(Netherlands) (North Macedonia)	Thiemo de Bakker; Predrag Rusevski	5; 7	7; 5	6; 1	7; 5
3	(Netherlands) (North Macedonia)	Robin Haase / Peter Wessels; Lazar Magdinčev / Predrag Rusevski	7; 5	5; 7	6^{6} 7^{8}			retired
4	(Netherlands) (North Macedonia)	Robin Haase; Predrag Rusevski	6; 4	6; 0	6; 3
5	(Netherlands) (North Macedonia)	Thiemo de Bakker; Ilija Martinoski	7^{7} 6^{3}	6; 3

=== Switzerland vs. Belarus ===
Switzerland
4
Football Manege, Minsk, Belarus
11–13 April 2008
carpter (indoor)

Belarus
1

			1	2	3	4	5
1	(Switzerland) (Belarus)	Stéphane Bohli; Max Mirnyi	6; 4	6; 4	7^{7} 6^{5}
2	(Switzerland) (Belarus)	Stanislas Wawrinka; Uladzimir Ignatik	4; 6	6; 1	7^{7} 6^{2}	6; 2
3	(Switzerland) (Belarus)	Yves Allegro / Stanislas Wawrinka; Max Mirnyi / Vladimir Voltchkov	6; 3	3; 6	1; 6	2; 6
4	(Switzerland) (Belarus)	Stanislas Wawrinka; Vladimir Voltchkov	7^{8} 6^{6}	4; 6	0; 6	7; 5	6; 4
5	(Switzerland) (Belarus)	Yves Allegro; Uladzimir Ignatik	7^{7} 6^{5}	6; 0

=== Georgia vs. Slovakia ===
Georgia
1
Sibamac Arena, National Tennis Centre, Bratislava, Slovakia
11–13 April 2008
clay (indoor)

Slovakia
4

			1	2	3	4	5
1	(Georgia (country)) (Slovakia)	Irakli Labadze; Lukáš Lacko	4; 6	7^{8} 6^{6}	3; 6	6; 3	19; 17
2	(Georgia (country)) (Slovakia)	Nodar Itonishvili; Dominik Hrbatý	4; 6	4; 6	4; 6
3	(Georgia (country)) (Slovakia)	Nodar Itonishvili / Irakli Labadze; Michal Mertiňák / Filip Polášek	3; 6	3; 6	5; 7
4	(Georgia (country)) (Slovakia)	Nodar Itonishvili; Lukáš Lacko	3; 6	1; 6	3; 6
5	(Georgia (country)) (Slovakia)	Revaz Osadze; Filip Polášek	0; 6	4; 6

== First Round Play-offs Matches ==
=== Poland vs. Belarus ===
Poland
4
Republic Olympic Training Center for Tennis, Minsk, Belarus
18–20 July 2008
hard (outdoor)

Belarus
1

			1	2	3	4	5
1	(Poland) (Belarus)	Michał Przysiężny; Vladimir Voltchkov	6; 2	4; 6	6; 1	6; 2
2	(Poland) (Belarus)	Jerzy Janowicz; Max Mirnyi	6; 4	7; 5	6; 4
3	(Poland) (Belarus)	Mariusz Fyrstenberg / Marcin Matkowski; Andrei Karatchenia / Pavel Katliarov	6; 4	6; 0	6; 2
4	(Poland) (Belarus)	Michał Przysiężny; Pavel Katliarov	6; 1	6; 2
5	(Poland) (Belarus)	Jerzy Janowicz; Andrei Karatchenia	6; 3	2; 6	4; 6

== Second Round Play-offs Matches ==
=== Italy vs. Latvia ===
Italy
3
Sporting Club Montecatini, Montecatini, Italy
19–21 September 2008
clay (outdoor)

Latvia
2

			1	2	3	4	5
1	(Italy) (Latvia)	Fabio Fognini; Ernests Gulbis	6^{2} 7^{7}	1; 6	1; 6
2	(Italy) (Latvia)	Andreas Seppi; Andis Juška	6; 4	6; 2	7^{7} 6^{5}
3	(Italy) (Latvia)	Andreas Seppi / Potito Starace; Ernests Gulbis / Andis Juška	3; 6	6; 3	6; 2	6; 4
4	(Italy) (Latvia)	Andreas Seppi; Ernests Gulbis	6; 3	7; 5	3; 6	6^{3} 7^{7}	3; 6
5	(Italy) (Latvia)	Potito Starace; Andis Juška	6; 3	6; 4	7^{7} 6^{3}

=== Belarus vs. Georgia ===
Belarus
3
Republic Olympic Training Center for Tennis, Minsk, Belarus
18–20 July 2008
hard (outdoor)

Georgia
0

			1	2	3	4	5
1	(Belarus) (Georgia (country))	Uladzimir Ignatik; Lado Chikhladze	6; 3	6; 2	6; 4
2	(Belarus) (Georgia (country))	Andrei Karatchenia; Irakli Labadze	7^{7} 6^{5}	3; 6	2; 6	7; 5	5; 3
3	(Belarus) (Georgia (country))	Siarhei Betau / Max Mirnyi; Lado Chikhladze / Irakli Labadze	6; 3	3; 0				retired
4	(Belarus) (Georgia (country))	Uladzimir Ignatik; Nodar Itonishvili	6; 4					not completed
5	(Belarus) (Georgia (country))	Siarhei Betau; George Khrikadze						not played
