= 1999 Davis Cup =

1999 edition of the Davis Cup

Details
- Duration: 2 April – 5 December 1999
- Edition: 88th
- Teams: 128

Champion
- Winning nation: Australia

The 1999 Davis Cup (also known as the 1999 Davis Cup by NEC for sponsorship purposes) was the 88th edition of the Davis Cup, the most important tournament between national teams in men's tennis. 129 teams entered the competition, 16 in the World Group, 30 in the Americas Zone, 32 in the Asia/Oceania Zone, and 51 in the Europe/Africa Zone. Fiji made its first appearances in the tournament.

Australia defeated France in the final, held at the Acropolis Exhibition Hall in Nice, France, on 3–5 December, to win their 27th title and their first since 1986. Mark Philippoussis, Lleyton Hewitt and doubles pairing Todd Woodbridge and Mark Woodforde made up the winning Australian team in the final; Pat Rafter, who was involved in the Aussies' run to the final was forced to pull out due to injury.

== World Group ==
Participating teams
Australia	Belgium	Brazil	Czech Republic
France	Germany	Great Britain	Italy
Netherlands	Russia	Slovakia	Spain
Sweden	Switzerland	United States	Zimbabwe

=== Draw ===
First round 2–4 April
Trollhättan, Sweden (indoor carpet)
Sweden	2
Slovakia	3
Frankfurt, Germany (indoor carpet)
Germany	2
Russia	3
Birmingham, England (indoor hard)
United States	3
Great Britain	2
Harare, Zimbabwe (indoor hard)
Australia	4
Zimbabwe	1
Nîmes, France (indoor clay)
Netherlands	1
France	4
Lleida, Spain (clay)
Brazil	3
Spain	2
Ghent, Belgium (indoor clay)
Belgium	3
Czech Republic	2
Neuchâtel, Switzerland (indoor carpet)
Switzerland	3
Italy	2

Quarterfinals; 16–18 July
Moscow, Russia (indoor clay)
Slovakia	2
Russia	3
Chestnut Hill, MA, United States (hard)
United States	1
Australia	4
Pau, France (indoor carpet)
France	3
Brazil	2
Brussels, Belgium (clay)
Belgium	3
Switzerland	2

Semifinals; 24–26 September
Brisbane, Australia (grass)
Russia	1
Australia	4
Pau, France (indoor carpet)
France	4
Belgium	1

Final; 3–5 December
Nice, France (indoor clay)
Australia	3
France	2

=== Final ===
France vs. Australia

France
2
Acropolis Exhibition Hall, Nice, France
3–5 December 1999
Clay (indoors)

Australia
3

			1	2	3	4	5
1	(France) (Australia)	Sébastien Grosjean; Mark Philippoussis	4; 6	2; 6	4; 6
2	(France) (Australia)	Cédric Pioline; Lleyton Hewitt	7^{9} 6^{7}	7^{8} 6^{6}	7; 5
3	(France) (Australia)	Olivier Delaître / Fabrice Santoro; Todd Woodbridge / Mark Woodforde	6; 2	5; 7	2; 6	2; 6
4	(France) (Australia)	Cédric Pioline; Mark Philippoussis	3; 6	7; 5	1; 6	2; 6
5	(France) (Australia)	Sébastien Grosjean; Lleyton Hewitt	6; 4	6; 3

== World Group qualifying round ==
Date: 24–26 September

The eight losing teams in the World Group first round ties and eight winners of the Zonal Group I final round ties competed in the World Group qualifying round for spots in the 2000 World Group.

Home team	Score	Visiting team	Location	Venue	Door	Surface
Austria	3-2	Sweden	Pörtschach	Werzer Arena	Outdoor	Clay
Zimbabwe	4-1	Chile	Harare	Harare Municipal Centre	Indoor	Hard
Uzbekistan	0-5	Czech Republic	Tashkent	Yunusabad Tennis Centre	Indoor	Hard
Ecuador	2-3	Netherlands	Guayaquil	Club Nacional de Guayaquil	Outdoor	Clay
New Zealand	0-5	Spain	Hamilton	Mystery Creek Events Centre	Indoor	Hard
Italy	3-2	Finland	Sassari	Torres Tennis Sassari	Outdoor	Clay
Great Britain	4-1	South Africa	Birmingham	National Indoor Arena	Indoor	Hard
Romania	1-4	Germany	Bucharest	Arena Club	Outdoor	Clay

- Czech Republic, Germany, Great Britain, Italy, Netherlands, Spain and Zimbabwe remain in the World Group in 2000.
- Austria are promoted to the World Group in 2000.
- Chile, Ecuador, Finland, New Zealand, Romania, South Africa and Uzbekistan remain in Zonal Group I in 2000.
- Sweden are relegated to Zonal Group I in 2000.

== Americas Zone ==
=== Group I ===
Second Round Play-offs
Caracas, Venezuela (hard)
Venezuela	1
Bahamas	3

First Round Play-offs
Caracas, Venezuela (hard)
Argentina	4
Venezuela	1
Nassau, Bahamas (hard)
Canada	4
Bahamas	1

First Round
Argentina
bye
Salinas, Ecuador (hard)
Venezuela	2
Ecuador	3
Cali, Colombia (clay)
Colombia	3
Canada	2
Nassau, Bahamas (hard)
Bahamas	0
Chile	5

Second Round
Salinas, Ecuador (hard)
Argentina	1
Ecuador	4
Bogotá, Colombia (clay)
Colombia	0
Chile	5

- Venezuela relegated to Group II in 2000.
- Ecuador and Chile advance to World Group qualifying round.

=== Group II ===
Relegation Play-offs
Port-au-Prince, Haiti (clay)
Paraguay	5
Haiti	0
San José, Costa Rica (hard)
Dominican Republic	2
Costa Rica	3

First Round
San Luis Potosí City, Mexico (hard)
Mexico	3
Paraguay	2
Havana, Cuba (indoor hard)
Cuba	4
Haiti	1
Santo Domingo, Dominican Rep. (hard)
Peru	4
Dominican Republic	1
San Rafael de Escazú, Costa Rica
Costa Rica	1
Uruguay	4

Second Round
Havana, Cuba (hard)
Mexico	3
Cuba	2
Lima, Peru (clay)
Peru	4
Uruguay	1

Third Round
Lima, Peru (clay)
Mexico	2
Peru	3

- Haiti and Dominican Republic relegated to Group III in 2000.
- Peru promoted to Group I in 2000.

=== Group III ===
- Venue: Fredo Maduro Centre, Panama City, Panama
- Date: 3–7 May

Rank	Team
1	El Salvador
2	Guatemala
3	Panama
4	Bolivia
5	Netherlands Antilles
6	Jamaica
7	Antigua and Barbuda
8	Honduras

- El Salvador and Guatemala promoted to Group II in 2000.
- Antigua and Barbuda and Honduras relegated to Group IV in 2000.

=== Group IV ===
- Venue: Hasely Crawford Stadium, Port of Spain, Trinidad and Tobago
- Date: 8–14 March

	PUR	TRI	ISV	LCA	BER	BAR	ECA	RR; W–L	Match; W–L	Set; W–L	Standings
Puerto Rico		3–0	2–1	3–0	2–1	3–0	3–0	6–0	16–2 (89%)	32–7 (82%)	1
Trinidad and Tobago	0–3		2–1	3–0	2–1	2–1	3–0	5–1	12–6 (67%)	25–17 (60%)	2
U.S. Virgin Islands	1–2	1–2		2–1	2–1	3–0	2–1	4–2	11–7 (61%)	26–16 (62%)	3
Saint Lucia	0–3	0–3	1–2		3–0	2–1	3–0	3–3	9–9 (50%)	21–20 (51%)	4
Bermuda	1–2	1–2	1–2	0–3		3–0	2–1	2–4	8–10 (44%)	20–23 (47%)	5
Barbados	0–3	1–2	0–3	1–2	0–3		3–0	1–5	5–13 (28%)	12–28 (30%)	6
Eastern Caribbean	0–3	0–3	1–2	0–3	1–2	0–3		0–6	2–16 (11%)	9–34 (21%)	7

- Puerto Rico and Trinidad and Tobago promoted to Group III in 2000.

== Asia/Oceania Zone ==
=== Group I ===
Second Round Play-offs
Shenzhen, China (hard)
China	3
Pakistan	0

First Round Play-offs
Calcutta, India (grass)
India	5
China	0
Beirut, Lebanon (indoor hard)
Pakistan	1
Lebanon	4

First Round
Seogwipo, South Korea (hard)
India	2
South Korea	3
Shenzhen, China (hard)
New Zealand	3
China	2
Tashkent, Uzbekistan (indoor hard)
Pakistan	1
Uzbekistan	4
Zouk Mikael, Lebanon (indoor hard)
Lebanon	1
Japan	4

Second Round
Christchurch, New Zealand (indoor hard)
South Korea	2
New Zealand	3
Fukushima, Japan (indoor carpet)
Uzbekistan	3
Japan	2

- Pakistan relegated to Group II in 2000.
- New Zealand and Uzbekistan advance to World Group qualifying round.

=== Group II ===
Relegation Play-offs
Kaohsiung, Taiwan (clay)
Qatar	0
Chinese Taipei	5
Almaty, Kazakhstan (indoor hard)
Sri Lanka	1
Kazakhstan	4

First Round
Doha, Qatar (hard)
Indonesia	5
Qatar	0
Manila, Philippines (hard)
Chinese Taipei	2
Philippines	3
Colombo, Sri Lanka (clay)
Iran	3
Sri Lanka	2
Nonthaburi, Thailand (hard)
Kazakhstan	0
Thailand	5

Second Round
Jakarta, Indonesia (indoor hard)
Indonesia
Philippines
Tehran, Iran (clay)
Iran	0
Thailand	5

Third Round
Nonthaburi, Thailand (hard)
Philippines	1
Thailand	4

- Qatar and Sri Lanka relegated to Group III in 2000.
- Thailand promoted to Group I in 2000.

=== Group III ===
- Venue: National Centre, Dhaka, Bangladesh
- Date: 10–14 March

Rank	Team
1	Malaysia
2	Hong Kong
3	Tajikistan
4	Pacific Oceania
5	Bangladesh
6	Syria
7	Saudi Arabia
8	Bahrain

- Malaysia and Hong Kong promoted to Group II in 2000.
- Saudi Arabia and Bahrain relegated to Group IV in 2000.

=== Group IV ===
- Venue: National Centre, Bandar Seri Begawan, Brunei
- Date: 3–7 February

Rank	Team
1	Kuwait
2	Singapore
3	Oman
4	United Arab Emirates
5	Fiji
6	Jordan
7	Iraq
8	Brunei

- Kuwait and Singapore promoted to Group III in 2000.

== Europe/Africa Zone ==
=== Group I ===
Second Round Play-offs
Zagreb, Croatia (indoor carpet)
Croatia	1
Portugal	4
Kyiv, Ukraine (clay)
Israel	2
Ukraine	3

First Round Play-offs
bye
Croatia
bye
Portugal
Israel
bye
Ukraine
bye

First Round
Romania
bye
bye
Croatia
Austria
bye
bye
Portugal
Israel
bye
bye
Finland
Kyiv, Ukraine (indoor carpet)
Ukraine	2
Belarus	3
bye
South Africa

Second Round
Bucharest, Romania (clay)
Romania	3
Croatia	2
Wels, Austria (indoor clay)
Austria	4
Portugal	1
Helsinki, Finland (indoor carpet)
Israel	2
Finland	3
Cape Town, South Africa (hard)
Belarus	1
South Africa	4

- Croatia and Israel relegated to Group II in 2000.
- Romania, Austria, Finland, and South Africa advance to World Group qualifying round.

=== Group II ===
Relegation Play-offs
Ljubljana, Slovenia (clay)
Senegal	0
Slovenia	5
Lomé, Togo (hard)
Greece	4
Togo	1
Jūrmala, Latvia (clay)
Latvia	4
Macedonia	1
Istanbul, Turkey (hard)
Yugoslavia	2
Turkey	3

First Round
Aalborg, Denmark (indoor carpet)
Denmark	5
Senegal	0
Dublin, Ireland (indoor carpet)
Slovenia	2
Ireland	3
Budapest, Hungary (clay)
Hungary	5
Greece	0
Plovdiv, Bulgaria (clay)
Togo	0
Bulgaria	5
Jūrmala, Latvia (indoor carpet)
Latvia	2
Poland	3
Abidjan, Ivory Coast (hard)
Macedonia	0
Ivory Coast	5
Casablanca, Morocco (clay)
Yugoslavia	1
Morocco	4
Oslo, Norway (indoor carpet)
Turkey	0
Norway	5

Second Round
Skagen, Denmark (hard)
Denmark	3
Ireland	2
Budapest, Hungary (clay)
Hungary	4
Bulgaria	1
Abidjan, Ivory Coast (hard)
Poland	3
Ivory Coast	1
Oslo, Norway (clay)
Morocco	4
Norway	1

Third Round
Budapest, Hungary (clay)
Denmark	1
Hungary	3
Casablanca, Morocco (clay)
Poland	0
Morocco	5

- Senegal, Togo, Macedonia, and Yugoslavia relegated to Group III in 2000.
- Hungary and Morocco promoted to Group I in 2000.

=== Group III ===
==== Zone A ====
- Venue: Gezira Sporting Club, Cairo, Egypt
- Date: 24–28 February

Rank	Team
1	Egypt
2	Luxembourg
3	Bosnia and Herzegovina
4	Tunisia
5	Nigeria
6	Benin
7	Algeria
8	Ghana

- Egypt and Luxembourg promoted to Group II in 2000.
- Algeria and Ghana relegated to Group IV in 2000.

==== Zone B ====
- Venue: Sini-Valge Tennis Club, Tallinn, Estonia
- Date: 9–13 June

Rank	Team
1	Estonia
2	Lithuania
3	Moldova
4	Armenia
5	Monaco
6	Georgia
7	Kenya
8	Zambia

- Estonia and Lithuania promoted to Group II in 2000.
- Kenya and Zambia relegated to Group IV in 2000.

=== Group IV ===
- Venue: Accra Sports Stadium, Accra, Ghana
- Date: 18–22 May

Zone A

	ISL	MLT	CYP	ETH	SUD	RR; W–L	Match; W–L	Set; W–L	Standings
Iceland		2–1	2–1	3–0	3–0	4–0	10–2 (83%)	22–3 (88%)	1
Malta	1–2		2–1	3–0	3–0	3–1	9–3 (75%)	17–9 (65%)	2
Cyprus	1–2	1–2		3–0	3–0	2–2	8–4 (67%)	17–9 (65%)	3
Ethiopia	0–3	0–3	0–3		3–0	1–3	3–9 (25%)	7–19 (27%)	4
Sudan	0–3	0–3	0–3	0–3		0–4	0–12 (0%)	1–24 (4%)	5

Zone B

	MAD	BOT	AZE	SMR	UGA	RR; W–L	Match; W–L	Set; W–L	Standings
Madagascar		2–1	1–2	2–1	3–0	3–1	8–4 (67%)	17–9 (65%)	1
Botswana	1–2		2–1	2–1	3–0	3–1	8–4 (67%)	18–12 (60%)	2
Azerbaijan	2–1	1–2		2–1	2–1	3–1	7–5 (58%)	15–12 (56%)	3
San Marino	1–2	1–2	1–2		2–1	1–3	5–7 (42%)	14–17 (45%)	4
Uganda	0–3	0–3	1–2	1–2		0–4	2–10 (17%)	7–21 (25%)	5

- Iceland, Malta, Madagascar and Botswana promoted to Group III in 2000.
