= Palais des Congrès Acropolis =

Convention center in Nice, France

Coordinates: 43.704662°N 7.280803°E

Logo of Acropolis

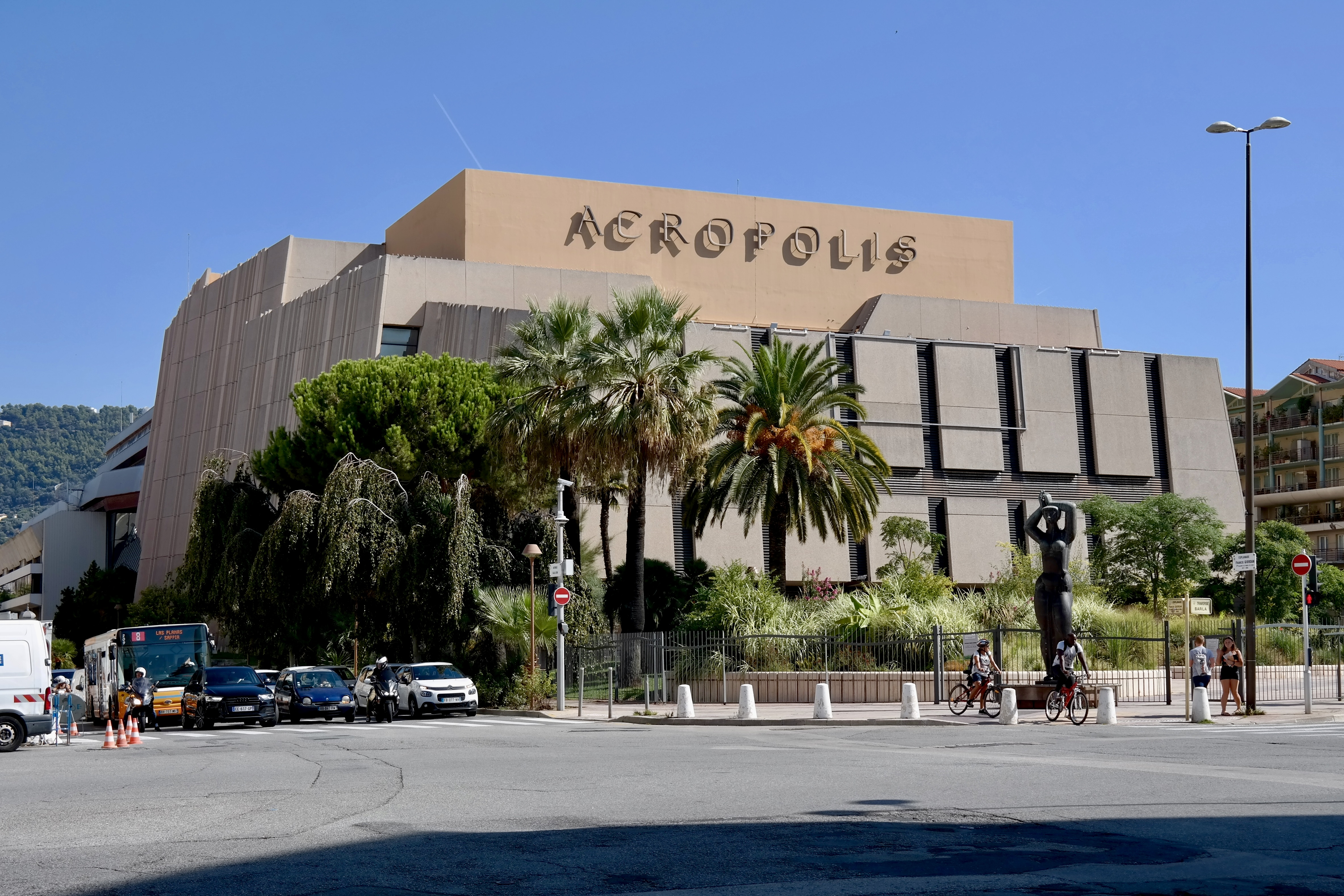
Acropolis in 2019

The Palais des Congrès Acropolis (French pronunciation: [palɛ de kɔ̃ɡʁɛ akʁɔpɔlis]; formerly known as Parc Expo) was a convention center located in Nice, France. It hosted various conventions, fairs, concerts, operas, productions of shows and exhibitions.

In 2012, Nice's Palais des Congrès Acropolis was the event venue for the 2012 World Figure Skating Championships. The facility also hosted the 1999 Davis Cup final, where the main convention was converted into a temporary tennis court. In 2023, work started on its demolition for the promulgation of the Promenade du Paillon.

Preceded by Forum di Assago; Assago	Davis Cup; Final Venue; 1999	Succeeded by Palau Sant Jordi; Barcelona
