= 2006 Davis Cup World Group =

- Date: 10 February – 3 December
- Edition: 26th

Champions
- Russia
- Davis Cup

The World Group was the highest level of Davis Cup competition in 2006. The first-round losers went into the Davis Cup World Group play-offs, and the winners progress to the quarterfinals. The quarterfinalists were guaranteed a World Group spot for 2007.

== Participating teams ==
Participating teams
Argentina	Australia	Austria	Belarus
Chile	Croatia	France	Germany
Netherlands	Romania	Russia	Slovakia
Spain	Sweden	Switzerland	United States

=== Draw ===
First round 10-12 February
Graz, Austria (indoor clay)
S	Croatia	3
Austria	2
Buenos Aires, Argentina (clay)
S	Argentina	5
Sweden	0
Minsk, Belarus (indoor carpet)
S	Spain	1
Belarus	4
Geneva, Switzerland (indoor clay)
S	Australia	3
Switzerland	2
Halle, Germany (indoor hard)
Germany	2
S	France	3
Amsterdam, Netherlands (ind. carpet)
Netherlands	0
S	Russia	5
La Jolla, United States (hard)
Romania	1
S	United States	4
Rancagua, Chile (clay)
Chile	4
S	Slovakia	1

Quarterfinals; 7-9 April
Zagreb, Croatia (indoor carpet)
S	Croatia	2
S	Argentina	3
Melbourne, Australia (hard)
Belarus	0
S	Australia	5
Pau, France (indoor carpet)
S	France	1
S	Russia	4
Rancho Mirage, USA (grass)
S	United States	3
Chile	2

Semifinals; 22-24 September
Buenos Aires, Argentina (clay)
S	Argentina	5
S	Australia	0
Moscow, Russia (indoor clay)
S	Russia	3
S	United States	2

Final; 1-3 December
Moscow, Russia (indoor carpet)
S	Argentina	2
S	Russia	3

== First round ==
=== Austria vs. Croatia ===
Austria
2
Schwarzl Freizeit Zentrum, Graz, Austria
10–12 February 2006
Clay (i)

Croatia
3

			1	2	3	4	5
1	(Austria) (Croatia)	Jürgen Melzer; Mario Ančić	7^{7} 6^{2}	7^{7} 6^{4}	4; 6	4; 6	3; 6
2	(Austria) (Croatia)	Stefan Koubek; Ivan Ljubičić	2; 6	2; 6	4; 6
3	(Austria) (Croatia)	Julian Knowle / Jürgen Melzer; Mario Ančić / Ivan Ljubičić	6; 3	6; 3	4; 6	4; 6	6; 8
4	(Austria) (Croatia)	Alexander Peya; Ivan Cerović	4; 6	6; 2	6; 4
5	(Austria) (Croatia)	Stefan Koubek; Marin Čilić	6; 1	7; 5

=== Argentina vs. Sweden ===
Argentina
5
Parque Roca, Buenos Aires, Argentina
10–12 February 2006
Clay

Sweden
0

			1	2	3	4	5
1	(Argentina) (Sweden)	David Nalbandian; Robin Söderling	3; 6	6; 2	6; 4	6; 1
2	(Argentina) (Sweden)	José Acasuso; Thomas Johansson	6; 1	6; 1	6; 3
3	(Argentina) (Sweden)	Agustín Calleri / David Nalbandian; Simon Aspelin / Jonas Björkman	6; 2	7^{7} 6^{4}	2; 6	6; 4
4	(Argentina) (Sweden)	Juan Ignacio Chela; Thomas Johansson	6; 4	6; 1
5	(Argentina) (Sweden)	José Acasuso; Jonas Björkman	6; 0	6; 1

=== Belarus vs. Spain ===
Belarus
4
Football Manege, Minsk, Belarus
10–12 February 2006
Carpet (i)

Spain
1

			1	2	3	4	5
1	(Belarus) (Spain)	Max Mirnyi; Tommy Robredo	6; 3	6^{5} 7^{7}	6; 3	6; 3
2	(Belarus) (Spain)	Vladimir Voltchkov; David Ferrer	6; 3	6; 4	6; 3
3	(Belarus) (Spain)	Max Mirnyi / Vladimir Voltchkov; Feliciano López / Fernando Verdasco	7^{7} 6^{2}	6; 4	7; 5
4	(Belarus) (Spain)	Serguei Tarasevitch; David Ferrer	2; 6	1; 6
5	(Belarus) (Spain)	Vladimir Voltchkov; Tommy Robredo	7^{8} 6^{6}	6; 3

=== Switzerland vs. Australia ===
Switzerland
2
SEG Geneva Arena, Geneva, Switzerland
10–12 February 2006
Clay (i)

Australia
3

			1	2	3	4	5
1	(Switzerland) (Australia)	Michael Lammer; Peter Luczak	6; 1	3; 6	0; 6	3; 6
2	(Switzerland) (Australia)	Stanislas Wawrinka; Chris Guccione	7; 5	3; 6	6; 4	7^{8} 6^{6}
3	(Switzerland) (Australia)	Yves Allegro / Stanislas Wawrinka; Wayne Arthurs / Paul Hanley	6^{6} 7^{8}	4; 6	6; 4	6^{5} 7^{7}
4	(Switzerland) (Australia)	Stanislas Wawrinka; Peter Luczak	6; 4	6; 2	6^{7} 7^{9}	6; 2
5	(Switzerland) (Australia)	George Bastl; Chris Guccione	5; 7	3; 6	6^{7} 7^{9}

=== Germany vs. France ===
Germany
2
Gerry Weber Stadium, Halle, Germany
10–12 February 2006
Hard (i)

France
3

			1	2	3	4	5
1	(Germany) (France)	Nicolas Kiefer; Sébastien Grosjean	5; 7	6^{7} 7^{9}	0; 6
2	(Germany) (France)	Tommy Haas; Richard Gasquet	6; 1	4; 6	4; 6	7^{7} 6^{1}	3; 6
3	(Germany) (France)	Tommy Haas / Alexander Waske; Arnaud Clément / Michaël Llodra	7^{8} 6^{6}	3; 6	4; 6	1; 6
4	(Germany) (France)	Rainer Schüttler; Arnaud Clément	6; 4	6; 3
5	(Germany) (France)	Tommy Haas; Michaël Llodra	6; 3	6; 3

=== Netherlands vs. Russia ===
Netherlands
0
Amsterdam RAI, Amsterdam, Netherlands
10–12 February 2006
Carpet (i)

Russia
5

			1	2	3	4	5
1	(Netherlands) (Russia)	Raemon Sluiter; Dmitry Tursunov	7^{7} 6^{2}	4; 6	6^{5} 7^{7}	6^{5} 7^{7}
2	(Netherlands) (Russia)	Melle Van Gemerden; Nikolay Davydenko	6^{6} 7^{8}	5; 7	4; 6
3	(Netherlands) (Russia)	Raemon Sluiter / John Van Lottum; Igor Andreev / Mikhail Youzhny	2; 6	6; 3	4; 6	4; 6
4	(Netherlands) (Russia)	Jesse Huta Galung; Igor Andreev	3; 6	6; 4	6^{7} 7^{9}
5	(Netherlands) (Russia)	Melle Van Gemerden; Dmitry Tursunov	6^{4} 7^{7}	6^{5} 7^{7}

=== United States vs. Romania ===
United States
4
La Jolla Beach and Tennis Club, La Jolla, United States
10–12 February 2006
Hard

Romania
1

			1	2	3	4	5
1	(United States) (Romania)	Andy Roddick; Andrei Pavel	7^{7} 6^{2}	6; 2	6^{8} 7^{10}	2; 6	4; 6
2	(United States) (Romania)	James Blake; Victor Hănescu	6; 4	7^{7} 6^{5}	6; 2
3	(United States) (Romania)	Bob Bryan / Mike Bryan; Victor Hănescu / Horia Tecău	6; 2	0; 0				retired
4	(United States) (Romania)	Andy Roddick; Răzvan Sabău	6; 3	6; 3	6; 2
5	(United States) (Romania)	James Blake; Horia Tecău	6; 1	7; 5

=== Chile vs. Slovakia ===
Chile
4
Medialuna de Rancagua, Rancagua, Chile
10–12 February 2006
Clay

Slovakia
1

			1	2	3	4	5
1	(Chile) (Slovakia)	Fernando González; Michal Mertiňák	7^{7} 6^{5}	7^{7} 6^{3}	6; 3
2	(Chile) (Slovakia)	Nicolás Massú; Dominik Hrbatý	6^{5} 7^{7}	6; 3	6; 1	7^{7} 6^{4}
3	(Chile) (Slovakia)	Fernando González / Nicolás Massú; Lukáš Lacko / Michal Mertiňák	6; 2	7; 5	3; 6	6; 4
4	(Chile) (Slovakia)	Paul Capdeville; Viktor Bruthans	6; 4	7; 5
5	(Chile) (Slovakia)	Adrián García; Lukáš Lacko	4; 6	1; 4				retired

== Quarterfinals ==
=== Croatia vs. Argentina ===
Croatia
2
Dom Sportova, Zagreb, Croatia
7–9 April 2006
Carpet (i)

Argentina
3

			1	2	3	4	5
1	(Croatia) (Argentina)	Ivan Ljubičić; Agustín Calleri	6^{7} 7^{9}	5; 7	7^{8} 6^{6}	6; 1	6; 2
2	(Croatia) (Argentina)	Marin Čilić; David Nalbandian	1; 6	1; 6	2; 6
3	(Croatia) (Argentina)	Marin Čilić / Ivan Ljubičić; José Acasuso / David Nalbandian	4; 6	2; 6	6; 3	4; 6
4	(Croatia) (Argentina)	Ivan Ljubičić; David Nalbandian	6; 3	6; 4	6; 4
5	(Croatia) (Argentina)	Saša Tuksar; Juan Ignacio Chela	6; 3	4; 6	6^{6} 7^{8}	6^{5} 7^{7}

=== Australia vs. Belarus ===
Australia
5
Kooyong Stadium, Melbourne, Australia
7–9 April 2006
Hard

Belarus
0

			1	2	3	4	5
1	(Australia) (Belarus)	Chris Guccione; Max Mirnyi	7^{7} 6^{4}	3; 6	7; 5	3; 6	6; 4
2	(Australia) (Belarus)	Lleyton Hewitt; Vladimir Voltchkov	6; 2	6; 1	6; 2
3	(Australia) (Belarus)	Wayne Arthurs / Paul Hanley; Max Mirnyi / Vladimir Voltchkov	3; 6	6; 4	5; 7	6; 3	7; 5
4	(Australia) (Belarus)	Wayne Arthurs; Serguei Tarasevitch	7^{8} 6^{6}	6; 2
5	(Australia) (Belarus)	Chris Guccione; Alexandr Zotov	6; 1	6; 3

=== France vs. Russia ===
France
1
Palais des Sports, Pau, France
7–9 April 2006
Carpet (i)

Russia
4

			1	2	3	4	5
1	(France) (Russia)	Richard Gasquet; Marat Safin	6^{4} 7^{7}	6; 4	3; 6	7^{7} 6^{1}	1; 6
2	(France) (Russia)	Arnaud Clément; Nikolay Davydenko	6; 3	2; 6	4; 6	6^{4} 7^{7}
3	(France) (Russia)	Arnaud Clément / Michaël Llodra; Dmitry Tursunov / Mikhail Youzhny	6; 3	6; 3	6^{3} 7^{7}	5; 7	6; 2
4	(France) (Russia)	Richard Gasquet; Dmitry Tursunov	1; 6	6; 3	7^{7} 6^{4}	3; 6	5; 7
5	(France) (Russia)	Michaël Llodra; Mikhail Youzhny	2; 6	6; 4	6^{3} 7^{7}

=== United States vs. Chile ===
United States
3
Mission Hills Country Club, Rancho Mirage, United States
7–9 April 2006
Grass

Chile
2

			1	2	3	4	5
1	(United States) (Chile)	James Blake; Fernando González	7^{7} 6^{5}	6; 0	6^{2} 7^{7}	4; 6	8; 10
2	(United States) (Chile)	Andy Roddick; Nicolás Massú	6; 3	7^{7} 6^{5}	7^{7} 6^{5}
3	(United States) (Chile)	Bob Bryan / Mike Bryan; Paul Capdeville / Adrián García	6; 1	6; 2	6; 4
4	(United States) (Chile)	Andy Roddick; Fernando González	4; 6	7; 5	6; 3	6; 2
5	(United States) (Chile)	James Blake; Paul Capdeville	3; 6	4; 6

== Semifinals ==
=== Argentina vs. Australia ===
Argentina
5
Parque Roca, Buenos Aires, Argentina
22–24 September 2006
Clay

Australia
0

			1	2	3	4	5
1	(Argentina) (Australia)	David Nalbandian; Mark Philippoussis	6; 4	6; 3	6; 3
2	(Argentina) (Australia)	José Acasuso; Lleyton Hewitt	1; 6	6; 4	4; 6	6; 2	6; 1
3	(Argentina) (Australia)	Agustín Calleri / David Nalbandian; Wayne Arthurs / Paul Hanley	6; 4	6; 4	7; 5
4	(Argentina) (Australia)	Agustín Calleri; Paul Hanley	6; 0	6; 3
5	(Argentina) (Australia)	Juan Ignacio Chela; Wayne Arthurs						w/o

=== Russia vs. United States ===
Russia
3
Olympic Stadium, Moscow, Russia
22–24 September 2006
Clay (i)

United States
2

			1	2	3	4	5
1	(Russia) (United States)	Marat Safin; Andy Roddick	6; 4	6; 3	7^{7} 6^{5}
2	(Russia) (United States)	Mikhail Youzhny; James Blake	7; 5	1; 6	6; 1	7; 5
3	(Russia) (United States)	Dmitry Tursunov / Mikhail Youzhny; Bob Bryan / Mike Bryan	3; 6	4; 6	2; 6
4	(Russia) (United States)	Dmitry Tursunov; Andy Roddick	6; 3	6; 4	5; 7	3; 6	17; 15
5	(Russia) (United States)	Marat Safin; James Blake	5; 7	6^{4} 7^{7}

== Final ==
=== Russia vs. Argentina ===
Russia
3
Olympic Stadium, Moscow, Russia
1–3 December 2006
Carpet (i)

Argentina
2

			1	2	3	4	5
1	(Russia) (Argentina)	Nikolay Davydenko; Juan Ignacio Chela	6; 1	6; 2	5; 7	6; 4
2	(Russia) (Argentina)	Marat Safin; David Nalbandian	4; 6	4; 6	4; 6
3	(Russia) (Argentina)	Marat Safin / Dmitry Tursunov; Agustín Calleri / David Nalbandian	6; 2	6; 3	6; 4
4	(Russia) (Argentina)	Nikolay Davydenko; David Nalbandian	2; 6	2; 6	6; 4	4; 6
5	(Russia) (Argentina)	Marat Safin; José Acasuso	6; 3	3; 6	6; 3	7^{7} 6^{5}
