= Estadio Universidad del Mar =

Tennis court in La Serena, Chile

Coordinates: 29.826371°S 71.281114°W

Estadio Universidad del Mar is the main tennis court in La Serena, Chile. Built in 2007, it currently holds 10,000 spectators. It hosts the La Serena Open on the ATP Challenger Series as well as Davis Cup matches.
