= Belarus Davis Cup team =

Davis Cup team representing Belarus

Belarus
- Captain: Dzmitry Zhyrmont
- Nations Ranking: 76 ▼30 (21 March 2022) (suspended)
- Colors: Red & green
- First year: 1994
- Years played: 25
- Ties played (W–L): 62 (35–27)
- Years in World Group: 4 (3–4)
- Best finish: Semifinal (2004)
- Most total wins: Max Mirnyi (61)
- Most singles wins: Max Mirnyi (24); Vladimir Voltchkov (24)
- Most doubles wins: Max Mirnyi (37)
- Best doubles team: Max Mirnyi & Vladimir Voltchkov (19–7)
- Most ties played: Max Mirnyi (57)
- Most years played: Max Mirnyi (25)

The Belarus men's national tennis team represented Belarus in Davis Cup tennis competition until it was suspended in 2022, due to the 2022 Russian invasion of Ukraine. They are governed by the Belarus Tennis Association. In 2007, Belarus were defeated in the 2007 Davis Cup World Group play-offs by Peru, and therefore was relegated from the World Group.

Belarus was suspended in 2022, due to the 2022 Russian invasion of Ukraine.

== History ==
Belarus competed in its first Davis Cup in 1994, but at least one Belarusian player (Sergey Leonyuk) had previously represented the Soviet Union.

Belarus was suspended in 2022, due to the 2022 Russian invasion of Ukraine.

== Last team (2022) ==
- Ilya Ivashka
- Egor Gerasimov
- Martin Borisiouk
- Erik Arutiunian
- Andrei Vasilevski

== Performances ==
Here is the list of all match-ups since 1994.

=== 1990s ===
Year	Competition	Date	Location	Opponent	Score	Result
1994	Europe/Africa Zone Group III, Round Robin	4–8 May	Abidjan (CIV)	Algeria	2–1	Win
1994	Europe/Africa Zone Group III, Round Robin	4–8 May	Abidjan (CIV)	Benin	3–0	Win
1994	Europe/Africa Zone Group III, Round Robin	4–8 May	Abidjan (CIV)	Togo	3–0	Win
1994	Europe/Africa Zone Group III, Round Robin	4–8 May	Abidjan (CIV)	Cameroon	2–1	Win
1995	Europe/Africa Zone Group II, 1st Round	28–30 April	Minsk (BLR)	Ukraine	2–3	Loss
1995	Europe/Africa Zone Group II, Play-offs	14–16 July	Minsk (BLR)	Estonia	5–0	Win
1996	Europe/Africa Zone Group II, 1st Round	3–5 May	Esch-sur-Alzette (LUX)	Luxembourg	4–1	Win
1996	Europe/Africa Zone Group II, 2nd Round	12–14 July	Poznań (POL)	Poland	1–4	Loss
1997	Europe/Africa Zone Group II, 1st Round	2–4 May	Dublin (IRL)	Ireland	4–1	Win
1997	Europe/Africa Zone Group II, 2nd Round	11–13 July	Tampere (FIN)	Finland	2–3	Loss
1998	Europe/Africa Zone Group II, 1st Round	1–3 May	Minsk (BLR)	Luxembourg	5–0	Win
1998	Europe/Africa Zone Group II, 2nd Round	17–19 July	Agadir (MAR)	Morocco	3–2	Win
1998	Europe/Africa Zone Group II, 3rd Round	25–27 September	Abidjan (CIV)	Ivory Coast	4–1	Win
1999	Europe/Africa Zone Group I, 1st Round	12–14 February	Kyiv (UKR)	Ukraine	3–2	Win
1999	Europe/Africa Zone Group I, 2nd Round	2–4 April	Cape Town (RSA)	South Africa	1–4	Loss

=== 2000s ===
Year	Competition	Date	Location	Opponent	Score	Result
2000	Europe/Africa Zone Group I, 2nd Round	7–9 April	Minsk (BLR)	South Africa	4–1	Win
2000	World Group play-offs	21–23 July	St. Gallen (SUI)	Switzerland	0–5	Loss
2001	Europe/Africa Zone Group I, 2nd Round	6–8 April	Minsk (BLR)	Zimbabwe	3–2	Win
2001	World Group, Qualifying Round	21–23 September	Córdoba (ARG)	Argentina	0–5	Loss
2002	Europe/Africa Zone Group I, 1st Round	5–7 April	Harare (ZIM)	Zimbabwe	1–4	Loss
2002	Europe/Africa Zone Group I, Relegation Play-offs	12–14 July	Minsk (BLR)	Portugal	4–1	Win
2003	Europe/Africa Zone Group I, 1st Round	7–9 February	Minsk (BLR)	Israel	3–2	Win
2003	Europe/Africa Zone Group I, 2nd Round	4–6 April	Minsk (BLR)	Zimbabwe	4–1	Win
2003	World Group play-offs	19–21 September	Sundern (GER)	Germany	3–2	Win
2004	World Group, 1st Round	6–8 February	Minsk (BLR)	Russia	3–2	Win
2004	World Group, Quarterfinals	9–11 April	Minsk (BLR)	Argentina	5–0	Win
2004	World Group, Semifinals	24–26 September	Charleston (USA)	United States	0–4	Loss
2005	World Group, 1st Round	4–6 March	Brașov (ROU)	Romania	2–3	Loss
2005	World Group play-offs	23–25 September	Toronto (CAN)	Canada	3–2	Win
2006	World Group, 1st Round	10–12 February	Minsk (BLR)	Spain	4–1	Win
2006	World Group, Quarterfinals	7–9 April	Melbourne (AUS)	Australia	0–5	Loss
2007	World Group, 1st Round	9–11 February	Minsk (BLR)	Sweden	2–3	Loss
2007	World Group play-offs	21–23 September	Lima (PER)	Peru	1–4	Loss
2008	Europe/Africa Zone Group I, 2nd Round	11–13 April	Minsk (BLR)	Switzerland	1–4	Loss
2009	Europe/Africa Zone Group I, 2nd Round	6–8 March	Johannesburg (RSA)	South Africa	0–5	Loss

=== 2010s ===
Year	Competition	Date	Location	Opponent	Score	Result
2010	Europe/Africa Zone Group I, 1st Round	5–7 March	Castellaneta (ITA)	Italy	0–5	Loss
2010	Europe/Africa Zone Group I, 2nd Round Play-offs	17–19 September	Minsk (BLR)	Slovakia	1–4	Loss
2011	Europe/Africa Zone Group II, 1st Round	4–6 March	Minsk (BLR)	Bulgaria	4–1	Win
2011	Europe/Africa Zone Group II, 2nd Round	8–10 July	Gödöllő (HUN)	Hungary	2–3	Loss
2012	Europe/Africa Zone Group II, 1st Round	10–12 February	Minsk (BLR)	Moldova	4–1	Win
2012	Europe/Africa Zone Group II, 2nd Round	6–8 April	Minsk (BLR)	Bosnia and Herzegovina	4–1	Win
2012	Europe/Africa Zone Group II, 3rd Round	14–16 September	Łódź (POL)	Poland	2–3	Loss
2013	Europe/Africa Zone Group II, 1st Round	1–3 February	Monte Carlo (MON)	Monaco	1–3	Loss
2013	Europe/Africa Zone Group II, Play-offs	5–7 April	Tunis (TUN)	Tunisia	3–2	Win
2014	Europe/Africa Zone Group II, 1st Round	31 January – 2 February	Minsk (BLR)	Ireland	4–1	Win
2014	Europe/Africa Zone Group II, 2nd Round	4–6 April	Chișinău (MDA)	Moldova	1–4	Loss
2015	Europe/Africa Zone Group II, 1st Round	6–8 March	Dublin (IRL)	Ireland	5–0	Win
2015	Europe/Africa Zone Group II, 2nd Round	17–19 July	Istanbul (TUR)	Turkey	3–2	Win
2015	Europe/Africa Zone Group II, 3rd Round	18–20 September	Viana do Castelo (POR)	Portugal	2–3	Loss
2016	Europe/Africa Zone Group II, 1st Round	4–6 March	Cairo (EGY)	Egypt	3–1	Win
2016	Europe/Africa Zone Group II, 2nd Round	15–17 July	Minsk (BLR)	Latvia	4–1	Win
2016	Europe/Africa Zone Group II, 3rd Round	16–18 September	Minsk (BLR)	Denmark	4–1	Win
2017	Europe/Africa Zone Group I, 1st Round	3–5 February	Minsk (BLR)	Romania	3–2	Win
2017	Europe/Africa Zone Group I, 2nd Round	7–9 April	Minsk (BLR)	Austria	3–1	Win
2017	World Group, Play-Off	15–17 September	Biel (SUI)	Switzerland	2–3	Loss

== See also ==
- Davis Cup
- Belarus Billie Jean King Cup team
