= 1991 Davis Cup Europe/Africa Zone Group I =

International tennis competition

The Europe/Africa Zone was one of the three zones of the regional Davis Cup competition in 1991.

In the Europe/Africa Zone there were two different tiers, called groups, in which teams competed against each other to advance to the upper tier. Winners in Group I advanced to the World Group qualifying round, along with losing teams from the World Group first round. Teams who lost in the first round competed in the relegation play-offs, with winning teams remaining in Group I, whereas teams who lost their play-offs were relegated to the Europe/Africa Zone Group IIs in 1992.

== Participating nations ==
- Denmark
- Finland
- Great Britain
- Hungary
- Ireland
- Morocco
- Netherlands
- Portugal
- Poland
- Romania
- Switzerland
- Soviet Union

=== Draw ===
First Round
Netherlands
bye
Porto, Portugal (indoor clay)
Portugal	5
Ireland	0
Poznań, Poland (indoor carpet)
Poland	5
Romania	0
bye
Great Britain
Finland
bye
Rungsted, Denmark (indoor carpet)
Morocco	0
Denmark	5
Budapest, Hungary (indoor carpet)
Soviet Union	4
Hungary	1
bye
Switzerland

Second Round
Lisbon, Portugal (clay)
Netherlands	4
Portugal	1
Warsaw, Poland (clay)
Poland	1
Great Britain	4
Helsinki, Finland (hard)
Finland	2
Denmark	3
Davos, Switzerland (indoor carpet)
Soviet Union	2
Switzerland	3

- Netherlands, Great Britain, Denmark and Switzerland advance to World Group qualifying round.

Relegation Play-off; 3–5 May
Bucharest, Romania (clay)
Ireland	0
Romania	5
Budapest, Hungary (clay)
Morocco	0
Hungary	5

- Ireland and Morocco relegated to Group II in 1992.

== First round ==
=== Portugal vs. Ireland ===
Portugal
5
Porto Tennis Club, Porto, Portugal
1–3 February 1991
Clay (indoors)

Ireland
0

			1	2	3	4	5
1	(Portugal) (Republic of Ireland)	João Cunha e Silva; Owen Casey	5; 7	6; 1	6; 2	6; 3
2	(Portugal) (Republic of Ireland)	Nuno Marques; Peter Wright	6; 3	7; 5	6; 2
3	(Portugal) (Republic of Ireland)	João Cunha e Silva / Nuno Marques; Owen Casey / Peter Wright	6; 1	6; 4	6; 1
4	(Portugal) (Republic of Ireland)	Nuno Marques; Owen Casey	7; 5	6; 4
5	(Portugal) (Republic of Ireland)	Bernardo Mota; Stewart Doyle	6; 1	6; 1

=== Poland vs. Romania ===
Poland
5
Hala Widowiskowo-Sportowa, Poznań, Poland
1–3 February 1991
Carpet (indoors)

Romania
0

			1	2	3	4	5
1	(Poland) (Romania)	Wojciech Kowalski; Adrian Marcu	3; 6	6; 3	6^{1} 7^{7}	7^{7} 6^{3}	7; 5
2	(Poland) (Romania)	Darek Nowicki; Dinu Pescariu	6; 3	6; 3	5; 7	7^{7} 6^{5}
3	(Poland) (Romania)	Tomasz Iwański / Wojciech Kowalski; George Cosac / Florin Segărceanu	6; 2	7^{7} 6^{4}	7^{7} 6^{5}
4	(Poland) (Romania)	Tomasz Iwański; Dinu Pescariu	7^{7} 6^{4}	1; 6	6; 2
5	(Poland) (Romania)	Darek Nowicki; Adrian Marcu	6^{1} 7^{7}	6; 4	11; 9

=== Denmark vs. Morocco ===
Denmark
5
Hørsholm Rungsted Tennisklub, Rungsted, Denmark
1–3 February 1991
Carpet (indoors)

Morocco
0

			1	2	3	4	5
1	(Denmark) (Morocco)	Frederik Fetterlein; Karim Alami	6; 4	6; 3	6; 1
2	(Denmark) (Morocco)	Michael Tauson; Younes El Aynaoui	6; 1	6; 3	6; 3
3	(Denmark) (Morocco)	Morten Christensen / Michael Tauson; Karim Alami / Mohammed Ridaoui	6; 2	6; 2	6; 4
4	(Denmark) (Morocco)	Michael Tauson; Karim Alami	6; 3	6; 4
5	(Denmark) (Morocco)	Frederik Fetterlein; Younes El Aynaoui	6; 3	6; 1

=== Hungary vs. Soviet Union ===
Hungary
1
Vasas Sport Clubja, Budapest, Hungary
1–3 February 1991
Carpet (indoors)

Soviet Union
4

			1	2	3	4	5
1	(Hungary) (Soviet Union)	András Lányi; Andrei Cherkasov	3; 6	3; 6	3; 6
2	(Hungary) (Soviet Union)	László Markovits; Alexander Volkov	3; 6	4; 6	4; 6
3	(Hungary) (Soviet Union)	András Lányi / László Markovits; Andrei Chesnokov / Dimitri Poliakov	6; 3	6^{6} 7^{8}	6; 4	6; 4
4	(Hungary) (Soviet Union)	László Markovits; Andrei Cherkasov	6^{2} 7^{7}	5; 7	3; 6
5	(Hungary) (Soviet Union)	Sándor Noszály; Alexander Volkov	3; 6	3; 6

== Second round ==
=== Portugal vs. Netherlands ===
Portugal
1
Estádio Nacional, Lisbon, Portugal
3–5 May 1991
Clay

Netherlands
4

			1	2	3	4	5
1	(Portugal) (Netherlands)	João Cunha e Silva; Paul Haarhuis	6; 4	0; 6	4; 6	1; 6
2	(Portugal) (Netherlands)	Nuno Marques; Mark Koevermans	3; 6	6; 2	5; 7	0; 6
3	(Portugal) (Netherlands)	João Cunha e Silva / Nuno Marques; Paul Haarhuis / Mark Koevermans	6; 4	5; 7	6^{5} 7^{7}	3; 6
4	(Portugal) (Netherlands)	João Cunha e Silva; Mark Koevermans	6; 3	4; 6	2; 6
5	(Portugal) (Netherlands)	Nuno Marques; Paul Haarhuis	4; 6	6; 4	6; 4

=== Poland vs. Great Britain ===
Poland
1
Legia Warsaw, Warsaw, Poland
3–5 May 1991
Clay

Great Britain
4

			1	2	3	4	5
1	(Poland) (United Kingdom)	Wojciech Kowalski; Danny Sapsford	6^{3} 7^{7}	2; 6	7^{7} 6^{2}	1; 6
2	(Poland) (United Kingdom)	Tomasz Iwański; Jeremy Bates	4; 6	0; 6	4; 6
3	(Poland) (United Kingdom)	Tomasz Iwański / Wojciech Kowalski; Jeremy Bates / Nick Brown	2; 6	5; 7	6; 3	7^{7} 6^{3}	4; 6
4	(Poland) (United Kingdom)	Wojciech Kowalski; Jeremy Bates	6; 2	3; 6	6; 3
5	(Poland) (United Kingdom)	Bartłomiej Dąbrowski; Chris Wilkinson	6^{7} 7^{9}	3; 6

=== Finland vs. Denmark ===
Finland
2
Talin Tenniskeskus, Helsinki, Finland
3–5 May 1991
Hard

Denmark
3

			1	2	3	4	5
1	(Finland) (Denmark)	Olli Rahnasto; Michael Tauson	6^{2} 7^{7}	7^{10} 6^{8}	3; 6	7^{7} 6^{3}	6; 1
2	(Finland) (Denmark)	Aki Rahunen; Frederik Fetterlein	4; 6	0; 6	3; 6
3	(Finland) (Denmark)	Olli Rahnasto / Pasi Virtanen; Morten Christensen / Frederik Fetterlein	6; 4	0; 6	4; 6	4; 6
4	(Finland) (Denmark)	Aki Rahunen; Morten Christensen	6; 4	6; 4	6; 1
5	(Finland) (Denmark)	Olli Rahnasto; Frederik Fetterlein	1; 6	2; 6	1; 6

=== Switzerland vs. Soviet Union ===
Switzerland
3
Eisstadion, Davos, Switzerland
3–5 May 1991
Carpet (indoors)

Soviet Union
2

			1	2	3	4	5
1	(Switzerland) (Soviet Union)	Marc Rosset; Andrei Chesnokov	7^{7} 6^{5}	5; 7	3; 6	6; 4	11; 9
2	(Switzerland) (Soviet Union)	Jakob Hlasek; Andrei Cherkasov	7; 5	7; 5	6; 3
3	(Switzerland) (Soviet Union)	Jakob Hlasek / Claudio Mezzadri; Andrei Cherkasov / Dimitri Poliakov	6; 3	7^{7} 6^{4}	6; 3
4	(Switzerland) (Soviet Union)	Jakob Hlasek; Andrei Chesnokov	3; 6	4; 6
5	(Switzerland) (Soviet Union)	Marc Rosset; Andrei Cherkasov	4; 6	4; 6

== Relegation play-offs ==
=== Romania vs. Ireland ===
Romania
5
Club Sportiv Progresul, Bucharest, Romania
3–5 May 1991
Clay

Ireland
0

			1	2	3	4	5
1	(Romania) (Republic of Ireland)	Andrei Pavel; Owen Casey	6; 4	6; 1	6; 1
2	(Romania) (Republic of Ireland)	Adrian Marcu; Eoin Collins	6; 4	6; 2	6; 3
3	(Romania) (Republic of Ireland)	George Cosac / Florin Segărceanu; Eoin Collins / Peter Wright	4; 6	6; 4	6; 2	6^{4} 7^{7}	6; 0
4	(Romania) (Republic of Ireland)	Andrei Pavel; Peter Wright	7^{7} 6^{2}	6; 3
5	(Romania) (Republic of Ireland)	Adrian Marcu; Stewart Doyle	6; 2	6; 2

=== Hungary vs. Morocco ===
Hungary
5
Újpesti Tennis Club, Budapest, Hungary
3–5 May 1991
Clay

Morocco
0

			1	2	3	4	5
1	(Hungary) (Morocco)	Sándor Noszály; Arafat Chekrouni	6; 1	6; 4	6; 3
2	(Hungary) (Morocco)	László Markovits; Karim Alami	6; 3	6; 2	7^{7} 6^{4}
3	(Hungary) (Morocco)	András Lányi / László Markovits; Karim Alami / Arafat Chekrouni	6; 3	6; 4	4; 6	3; 6	6; 3
4	(Hungary) (Morocco)	Sándor Noszály; Karim Alami	6; 2	1; 6	7; 5
5	(Hungary) (Morocco)	Viktor Nagy; Arafat Chekrouni	6; 4	6; 1
