= 2007 Davis Cup World Group play-offs =

The World Group play-offs were the main play-offs of 2007 Davis Cup. Winners advanced to the World Group, and loser were relegated in the Zonal Regions I.

== Teams ==
Bold indicates team has qualified for the 2008 Davis Cup World Group.

From World Group

- Chile
- **Romania**
- Croatia
- Australia
- **Czech Republic**
- Switzerland
- Belarus
- **Austria**

From Americas Group I

- **Peru**
- Brazil

From Asia/Oceania Group I

- Japan
- **South Korea**

From Europe/Africa Group I

- Slovakia
- **Israel**
- **Serbia**
- **Great Britain**

== Results ==
**Seeded teams**

- Australia
- Austria
- Belarus
- Chile
- Croatia
- Czech Republic
- Romania
- Slovakia

**Unseeded teams**

- Brazil
- Great Britain
- Israel
- Japan
- Peru
- South Korea
- Serbia
- Switzerland

Home team	Score	Visiting team	Location	Venue	Door	Surface
**Serbia**	4–1	Australia	Belgrade	Beogradska Arena	Indoor	Clay
**Austria**	4–1	Brazil	Innsbruck	Olympiaworld Innsbruck	Indoor	Carpet
**Peru**	4–1	Belarus	Lima	Rinconada Country Club	Outdoor	Clay
**Israel**	3–2	Chile	Ramat HaSharon	Canada Stadium	Outdoor	Hard
**Great Britain**	4–1	Croatia	Wimbledon, London	All England Lawn Tennis Club	Outdoor	Grass
**Czech Republic**	3–2	Switzerland	Prague	Sazka Arena	Indoor	Hard
Japan	2–3	**Romania**	Osaka	Namihaya Dome	Indoor	Carpet
Slovakia	2–3	**South Korea**	Bratislava	Sibamac Arena	Indoor	Clay

- Austria, Czech Republic, and Romania will remain in the World Group in 2008.
- Great Britain, Israel, Peru, Serbia and South Korea are promoted to the World Group in 2008.
- Brazil, Japan and Slovakia will remain in Zonal Group I in 2008.
- Australia, Belarus, Chile, Croatia and Switzerland are relegated to Zonal Group I in 2008.

== Playoff results ==
=== Serbia vs. Australia ===
Serbia
4
Beogradska Arena, Belgrade, Serbia
21–23 September 2007
Clay (i)

Australia
1

			1	2	3	4	5
1	(Serbia) (Australia)	**Novak Djokovic**; Peter Luczak	**6**; 1	**6**; 4	**6**; 2
2	(Serbia) (Australia)	Janko Tipsarević; **Lleyton Hewitt**	2; **6**	**6**; 3	**6**; 4	1; **6**	1; **6**
3	(Serbia) (Australia)	**Novak Djokovic / Nenad Zimonjić**; Lleyton Hewitt / Paul Hanley	3; **6**	**6**; 4	**6**; 3	**6**; 2
4	(Serbia) (Australia)	**Novak Djokovic**; Chris Guccione	**6**; 3	**7^{7}** 6^{3}	**7^{7}** 6^{5}
5	(Serbia) (Australia)	**Boris Pašanski**; Peter Luczak	4; **6**	**6**; 3	**6**; 1

=== Austria vs. Brazil ===
Austria
4
Olympiaworld Innsbruck, Innsbruck, Austria
21–23 September 2007
Carpet (i)

Brazil
1

			1	2	3	4	5
1	(Austria) (Brazil)	**Jürgen Melzer**; Thomaz Bellucci	**6**; 4	**6**; 4	**6**; 4
2	(Austria) (Brazil)	**Stefan Koubek**; Ricardo Mello	**6**; 2	**6**; 3	**6**; 3
3	(Austria) (Brazil)	**Julian Knowle / Jürgen Melzer**; Gustavo Kuerten / André Sá	**6**; 1	**6**; 1	**6**; 4
4	(Austria) (Brazil)	**Jürgen Melzer**; Ricardo Mello	3; **6**	**6**; 4	**7**; 5
5	(Austria) (Brazil)	Werner Eschauer; **André Sá**	4; **6**	3; **6**

=== Peru vs. Belarus ===
Peru
4
Rinconada Country Club, Lima, Peru
21–23 September 2007
Clay

Belarus
1

			1	2	3	4	5
1	(Peru) (Belarus)	**Iván Miranda**; Max Mirnyi	**6**; 4	3; **6**	**7^{8}** 6^{6}	**6**; 4
2	(Peru) (Belarus)	**Luis Horna**; Vladimir Voltchkov	3; **6**	6^{4} **7^{7}**	**6**; 4	**6**; 4	**6**; 4
3	(Peru) (Belarus)	Matías Silva / Iván Miranda; **Max Mirnyi / Vladimir Voltchkov**	3; **6**	5; **7**	2; **6**
4	(Peru) (Belarus)	**Luis Horna**; Max Mirnyi	**6**; 4	**7**; 5	4; **6**	**7^{7}** 6^{4}
5	(Peru) (Belarus)	**Matías Silva**; Andrei Karatchenia	**6**; 4	**6**; 4

=== Israel vs. Chile ===
Israel
3
Canada Stadium, Ramat HaSharon, Israel
20–23 September 2007
Hard

Chile
2

			1	2	3	4	5
1	(Israel) (Chile)	**Dudi Sela**; Nicolás Massú	**6**; 3	**6**; 4	6^{3} **7^{7}**	**6**; 4
2	(Israel) (Chile)	Noam Okun; **Fernando González**	**6**; 4	3; **6**	5; **7**	4; **6**
3	(Israel) (Chile)	**Jonathan Erlich / Andy Ram**; Fernando González / Nicolás Massú	2; **6**	**7^{7}** 6^{1}	**6**; 2	3; **6**	**10**; 8
4	(Israel) (Chile)	**Dudi Sela**; Fernando González	4; **6**	**7^{7}** 6^{5}	5; **7**	**7^{9}** 6^{7}	**6**; 3
5	(Israel) (Chile)	Noam Okun; **Paul Capdeville**	1; 2					**retired**

=== Great Britain vs. Croatia ===
Great Britain
4
No. 1 Court, Wimbledon, London, United Kingdom
21–23 September 2007
Grass

Croatia
1

			1	2	3	4	5
1	(United Kingdom) (Croatia)	**Andy Murray**; Marin Čilić	3; **6**	**6**; 4	**6**; 2	4; **6**	**6**; 3
2	(United Kingdom) (Croatia)	**Tim Henman**; Roko Karanušić	**6**; 4	**6**; 3	**6**; 3
3	(United Kingdom) (Croatia)	**Jamie Murray / Tim Henman**; Lovro Zovko / Marin Čilić	4; **6**	**6**; 4	**7^{7}** 6^{3}	**7**; 5
4	(United Kingdom) (Croatia)	**Andy Murray**; Roko Karanušić	**6**; 4	**7^{7}** 6^{4}
5	(United Kingdom) (Croatia)	Jamie Baker; **Marin Čilić**	4; **6**	4; **6**

=== Czech Republic vs. Switzerland ===
Czech Republic
3
Sazka Arena, Prague, Czech Republic
21–23 September 2007
Hard (i)

Switzerland
2

			1	2	3	4	5
1	(Czech Republic) (Switzerland)	Radek Štěpánek; **Roger Federer**	3; **6**	2; **6**	**7^{7}** 6^{4}	6^{5} **7^{7}**
2	(Czech Republic) (Switzerland)	**Tomáš Berdych**; Stanislas Wawrinka	**7^{7}** 6^{2}	**6**; 4	**7**; 5
3	(Czech Republic) (Switzerland)	**Tomáš Berdych / Radek Štěpánek**; Yves Allegro / Roger Federer	3; **6**	5; **7**	**7^{9}** 6^{7}	**6**; 4	**6**; 4
4	(Czech Republic) (Switzerland)	Tomáš Berdych; **Roger Federer**	6^{5} **7^{7}**	6^{10} **7^{12}**	3; **6**
5	(Czech Republic) (Switzerland)	**Radek Štěpánek**; Stanislas Wawrinka	**7^{7}** 6^{3}	**6**; 3	**7^{7}** 6^{4}

=== Japan vs. Romania ===
Japan
2
Namihaya Dome, Osaka, Japan
21–23 September 2007
Carpet (i)

Romania
3

			1	2	3	4	5
1	(Japan) (Romania)	**Takao Suzuki**; Victor Hănescu	**7^{7}** 6^{4}	**6**; 1	**7^{7}** 6^{4}
2	(Japan) (Romania)	Go Soeda; **Andrei Pavel**	3; **6**	**7^{9}** 6^{7}	5; **7**	3; **6**
3	(Japan) (Romania)	**Satoshi Iwabuchi / Takao Suzuki**; Florin Mergea / Horia Tecău	**6**; 4	**6**; 4	**6**; 4
4	(Japan) (Romania)	Takao Suzuki; **Andrei Pavel**	**7^{8}** 6^{6}	**7^{7}** 6^{1}	1; **6**	4; **6**	4; **6**
5	(Japan) (Romania)	Go Soeda; **Victor Hănescu**	3; **6**	**7**; 5	6^{6} **7^{8}**	6^{3} **7^{7}**

=== Slovakia vs. South Korea ===
Slovakia
2
Sibamac Arena, Bratislava, Slovakia
21–23 September 2007
Clay (i)

South Korea
3

			1	2	3	4	5
1	(Slovakia) (South Korea)	Martin Kližan; **Lee Hyung-Taik**	3; **6**	0; **6**	1; **6**
2	(Slovakia) (South Korea)	**Lukáš Lacko**; Jun Woong-Sun	**6**; 3	**6**; 2	**7^{7}** 6^{2}
3	(Slovakia) (South Korea)	Lukáš Lacko / Michal Mertiňák; **Im Kyu-Tae / Lee Hyung-Taik**	0; **6**	3; **6**	2; **6**
4	(Slovakia) (South Korea)	Lukáš Lacko; **Lee Hyung-Taik**	3; **6**	3; **6**	**6**; 4	1; **6**
5	(Slovakia) (South Korea)	**Michal Mertiňák**; An Jae-Sung	**6**; 3	**6**; 2
