= Fiji Davis Cup team =

National tennis team

Fiji
- First year: 1999
- Years played: 3
- Ties played (W–L): 16 (6-10)
- Davis Cup titles: 0

The Fiji men's national tennis team represents Fiji in the Davis Cup a team tennis event run by the International Tennis Federation (ITF) and is governed by the Fiji Tennis Association. They have not competed since 2001.

== History ==
Fiji competed in its first Davis Cup in 1999. Their best result was fifth in Group IV in 1999 and 2000. Fiji started competing as part of the Pacific Oceania team. However they have not competed since 2001.

== Last team (2001) ==
- Sanjeev Tikaram
- Valu Fa
- David O'Connor
- Ajay Raniga

== See also ==
- Davis Cup
