= 2014 Davis Cup World Group play-offs =

World Cup from 2014

The 2014 Davis Cup World Group play-offs were held from 12 to 14 September. They were the main play-offs of the 2014 Davis Cup. Winners of the playoffs advanced to the 2015 World Group, and the losers were relegated to their respective Zonal Regions I.

== Teams ==
Bold indicates team has qualified for the 2015 Davis Cup World Group.

From World Group

- Netherlands
- **Canada**
- Spain
- **Australia**
- **United States**
- **Argentina**
- **Belgium**
- **Serbia**

From Americas Group I

- **Brazil**
- Colombia

From Asia/Oceania Group I

- Uzbekistan
- India

From Europe/Africa Group I

- **Croatia**
- Israel
- Ukraine
- Slovakia

== Results summary ==
Date: 12–14 September

The eight losing teams in the World Group first round ties and eight winners of the Zonal Group I final round ties competed in the World Group play-offs for spots in the 2015 World Group. The draw took place on April 8 in London.

**Seeded teams**

1. Serbia
2. Spain
3. Argentina
4. Canada
5. United States
6. Australia
7. Croatia
8. Belgium

**Unseeded teams**

- Brazil
- Colombia
- India
- Israel
- Netherlands
- Slovakia
- Ukraine
- Uzbekistan

Home team	Score	Visiting team	Location	Venue	Door	Surface
India	2–3	**Serbia**	Bangalore	KSLTA Tennis Stadium	Outdoor	Hard
**Brazil**	3–1	Spain	São Paulo	Ginásio do Ibirapuera	Indoor	Clay
Israel	2–3	**Argentina**	Sunrise, United States	Sunrise Tennis Club	Outdoor	Hard
**Canada**	3–2	Colombia	Halifax	Halifax Metro Centre	Indoor	Hard
**United States**	5–0	Slovakia	Chicago	Sears Centre	Indoor	Hard
**Australia**	5–0	Uzbekistan	Perth	Cottesloe Tennis Club	Outdoor	Grass
Netherlands	2–3	**Croatia**	Amsterdam	Ziggo Dome	Indoor	Clay
Ukraine	2–3	**Belgium**	Tallinn, Estonia	Tere Tennis Centre	Indoor	Hard

Note: Due to security concerns, the International Tennis Federation Board of Directors decided to move the World Group play-off ties originally scheduled to be held in Israel and Ukraine. Israel and Ukraine exercised their option of nominating neutral venues for their ties against Argentina and Belgium, respectively.

- Argentina, Australia, Belgium, Canada, Serbia and United States will remain in the World Group in 2015.
- Brazil and Croatia were promoted to the World Group in 2015.
- Colombia, India, Israel, Slovakia, Ukraine and Uzbekistan will remain in Zonal Group I in 2015.
- Netherlands and Spain were relegated to Zonal Group I in 2015.

== Playoff results ==
=== India vs. Serbia ===
India
2
KSLTA Tennis Stadium, Bangalore, India
12 – 14 September 2014
Hard

Serbia
3

			1	2	3	4	5
1	(India) (Serbia)	Yuki Bhambri; **Dušan Lajović**	3; **6**	2; **6**	5; **7**
2	(India) (Serbia)	Somdev Devvarman; **Filip Krajinović**	1; **6**	**6**; 4	3; **6**	2; **6**
3	(India) (Serbia)	**Rohan Bopanna / Leander Paes**; Ilija Bozoljac / Nenad Zimonjić	1; **6**	6^{4} **7^{7}**	**6**; 3	**6**; 3	**8**; 6
4	(India) (Serbia)	**Somdev Devvarman**; Dušan Lajović	1; **6**	**6**; 4	4; **6**	**6**; 3	**6**; 2
5	(India) (Serbia)	Yuki Bhambri; **Filip Krajinović**	3; **6**	4; **6**	4; **6**

=== Brazil vs. Spain ===
Brazil
3
Ginásio do Ibirapuera, São Paulo, Brazil
12 – 14 September 2014
Clay (i)

Spain
1

			1	2	3	4	5
1	(Brazil) (Spain)	Rogério Dutra Silva; **Roberto Bautista Agut**	0; **6**	1; **6**	3; **6**
2	(Brazil) (Spain)	**Thomaz Bellucci**; Pablo Andújar	3; **6**	6^{6} **7^{8}**	**6**; 4	**7**; 5	**6**; 3
3	(Brazil) (Spain)	**Marcelo Melo / Bruno Soares**; Marc López / David Marrero	**6**; 3	**7**; 5	**7**; 5
4	(Brazil) (Spain)	**Thomaz Bellucci**; Roberto Bautista Agut	**6**; 4	3; **6**	**6**; 3	**6**; 2
5	(Brazil) (Spain)	Rogério Dutra Silva; Pablo Andújar						**not** **played**

=== Israel vs. Argentina ===
Israel
2
Sunrise Tennis Club, Sunrise, United States
12 – 14 September 2014
Hard

Argentina
3

			1	2	3	4	5
1	(Israel) (Argentina)	Bar Tzuf Botzer; **Leonardo Mayer**	4; **6**	**6**; 3	2; **6**	1; **6**
2	(Israel) (Argentina)	**Dudi Sela**; Carlos Berlocq	**6**; 3	6^{5} **7^{7}**	**6**; 2	**6**; 2
3	(Israel) (Argentina)	**Jonathan Erlich / Andy Ram**; Federico Delbonis / Horacio Zeballos	**6**; 3	3; **6**	**6**; 1	3; **6**	**6**; 3
4	(Israel) (Argentina)	Dudi Sela; **Leonardo Mayer**	2; **6**	1; **6**	4; **6**
5	(Israel) (Argentina)	Bar Tzuf Botzer; **Carlos Berlocq**	2; **6**	3; **6**	0; **6**

=== Canada vs. Colombia ===
Canada
3
Scotiabank Centre, Halifax, Canada
12 – 14 September 2014
Hard (i)

Colombia
2

			1	2	3	4	5
1	(Canada) (Colombia)	**Vasek Pospisil**; Santiago Giraldo	**6**; 3	**7^{7}** 6^{2}	**6**; 3
2	(Canada) (Colombia)	**Milos Raonic**; Alejandro González	**6**; 3	**6**; 3	**6**; 2
3	(Canada) (Colombia)	Daniel Nestor / Vasek Pospisil; **Juan Sebastián Cabal / Robert Farah**	6^{3} **7^{7}**	6^{7} **7^{9}**	4; **6**
4	(Canada) (Colombia)	**Milos Raonic**; Santiago Giraldo	**6**; 1	**7^{7}** 6^{2}	**7**; 5
5	(Canada) (Colombia)	Frank Dancevic; **Alejandro González**	**6**; 4	5; **7**	2; **6**

=== United States vs. Slovakia ===
United States
5
Sears Centre, Chicago, United States
12 – 14 September 2014
Hard (i)

Slovakia
0

			1	2	3	4	5
1	(United States) (Slovakia)	**John Isner**; Norbert Gomboš	**7^{7}** 6^{5}	**6**; 4	**6**; 2
2	(United States) (Slovakia)	**Sam Querrey**; Martin Kližan	**7^{8}** 6^{6}	**6**; 3	**6**; 3
3	(United States) (Slovakia)	**Bob Bryan / Mike Bryan**; Norbert Gomboš / Lukáš Lacko	**6**; 1	**6**; 2	**6**; 1
4	(United States) (Slovakia)	**John Isner**; Lukáš Lacko	**6**; 3	**6**; 0
5	(United States) (Slovakia)	**Sam Querrey**; Norbert Gomboš	**6**; 4	4; **6**	**6**; 4

=== Australia vs. Uzbekistan ===
Australia
5
Cottesloe Tennis Club, Perth, Australia
12 – 14 September 2014
Grass

Uzbekistan
0

			1	2	3	4	5
1	(Australia) (Uzbekistan)	**Nick Kyrgios**; Denis Istomin	**6**; 4	**7**; 5	**6**; 4
2	(Australia) (Uzbekistan)	**Lleyton Hewitt**; Farrukh Dustov	**6**; 4	**6**; 4	**6**; 2
3	(Australia) (Uzbekistan)	**Chris Guccione / Lleyton Hewitt**; Farrukh Dustov / Denis Istomin	**6**; 3	**7^{7}** 6^{5}	**6**; 2
4	(Australia) (Uzbekistan)	**Samuel Groth**; Temur Ismailov	**6**; 3	**6**; 2
5	(Australia) (Uzbekistan)	**Nick Kyrgios**; Sanjar Fayziev	**6**; 1	**6**; 1

=== Netherlands vs. Croatia ===
Netherlands
2
Ziggo Dome, Amsterdam, Netherlands
12 – 14 September 2014
Clay (i)

Croatia
3

			1	2	3	4	5
1	(Netherlands) (Croatia)	Igor Sijsling; **Mate Delić**	**6**; 4	4; **6**	5; **7**	2; **6**
2	(Netherlands) (Croatia)	**Robin Haase**; Borna Ćorić	**7^{7}** 6^{4}	**6**; 1	**6**; 4
3	(Netherlands) (Croatia)	Robin Haase / Jean-Julien Rojer; **Marin Čilić / Marin Draganja**	2; **6**	**6**; 3	3; **6**	4; **6**
4	(Netherlands) (Croatia)	**Robin Haase**; Mate Delić	3; **6**	4; **6**	**6**; 4	**6**; 1	**6**; 4
5	(Netherlands) (Croatia)	Thiemo de Bakker; **Marin Čilić**	**7^{7}** 6^{4}	4; **6**	2; **6**	5; **7**

=== Ukraine vs. Belgium ===
Ukraine
2
Tere Tennis Centre, Tallinn, Estonia
12 – 14 September 2014
Hard (i)

Belgium
3

			1	2	3	4	5
1	(Ukraine) (Belgium)	**Sergiy Stakhovsky**; Steve Darcis	6^{5} **7^{7}**	**6**; 4	**6**; 2	**6**; 2
2	(Ukraine) (Belgium)	Illya Marchenko; **David Goffin**	6^{1} **7^{7}**	3; **6**	1; **6**
3	(Ukraine) (Belgium)	Sergei Bubka / Sergiy Stakhovsky; **Ruben Bemelmans / Olivier Rochus**	2; **6**	3; **6**	**6**; 2	**6**; 3	2; **6**
4	(Ukraine) (Belgium)	Sergiy Stakhovsky; **David Goffin**	3; **6**	1; **6**	2; **6**
5	(Ukraine) (Belgium)	**Illya Marchenko**; Steve Darcis	**7^{7}** 6^{2}	**6**; 4
