= Croatia Davis Cup team =

Croatia men's national tennis team

Croatia
- Captain: Ivan Dodig
- Nations Ranking: 17 (21 September 2026)
- Highest ranking: 1 (5 December 2005)
- Colors: Red and white
- First year: 1993
- Years played: 33
- Ties played (W–L): 83 (50–33)
- Years in World Group: 23 (30–24)
- Davis Cup titles: 2 (2005, 2018)
- Runners-up: 2 (2016, 2021)
- Most total wins: Marin Čilić (43–25)
- Most singles wins: Marin Čilić (33–19)
- Most doubles wins: Goran Ivanišević (13–5); Ivan Ljubičić (13–6)
- Best doubles team: Nikola Mektić & Mate Pavić (7-2)
- Most ties played: Marin Čilić (35)
- Most years played: Marin Čilić (16)

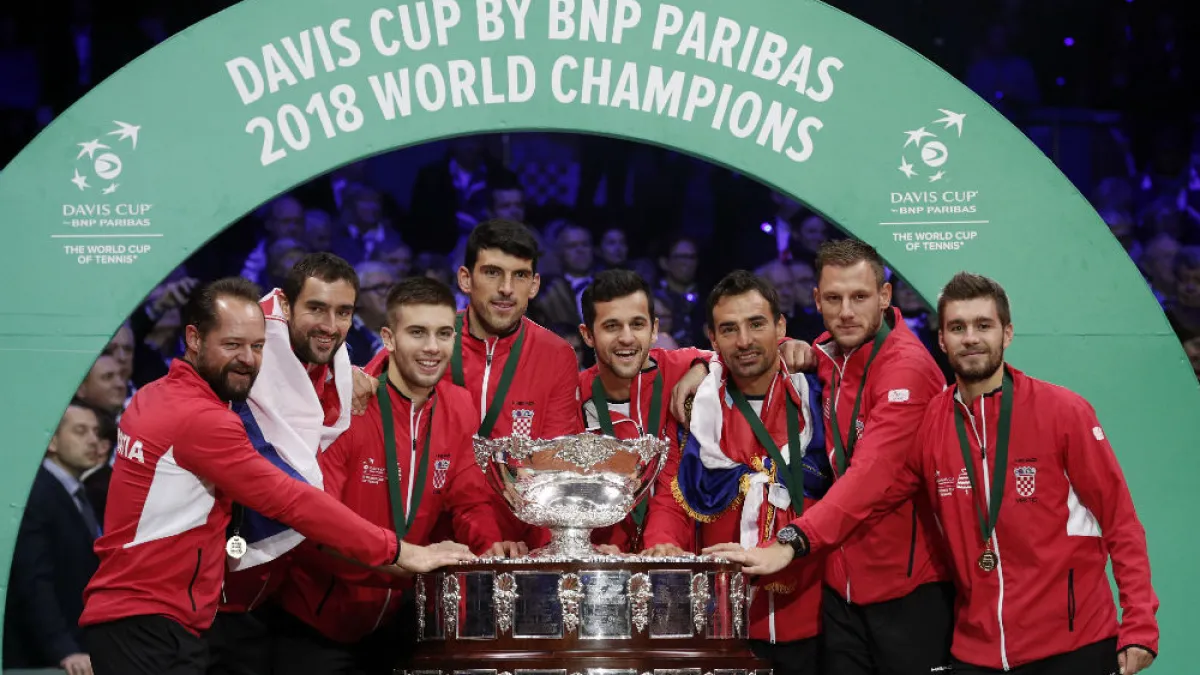
Croatia in 2018 with their second Davis Cup title

The Croatia men's national tennis team represents Croatia in the Davis Cup and is governed by the Croatian Tennis Association.Croatia won the Davis Cup twice, in 2005 and 2018, and was runner-up in 2016 and 2021.

== History ==
Croatia competed in its first Davis Cup in 1993 in Europe/Africa Group I semifinals beating Zimbabwe 3–2. In 1994 Croatia beat Portugal 4–0 in qualification round thus ensuring its first time appearance in World Group in 1995. Croatia lost in its debut from Germany and failed to qualify in the World Group again until 2002 where they beat Germany and earned its first quarterfinals. In 2005 Croatia won its first Davis Cup over Slovakia as the first unseeded nation to win the title, and also reached No. 1 at the ITF rankings for the first time. Croatia reached semifinals in 2009 but lost to Czech Republic 4–1. In 2016 Croatia reached the finals for the second time, again as unseeded nation, but lost to Argentina. Two years later, in 2018, Croatia won its second title by beating defending champion France, thus becoming the last Davis Cup champion in the old best-of-five competition format, and also the 10th country overall with more than one title.

== Results and fixtures ==
The following are lists of match results and scheduled matches for the current year.

Win Loss Fixture

=== 2025 ===
2025 Davis Cup Qualifiers first round

Croatia
3
Gradski vrt Hall, Osijek, Croatia
31 January–1 February 2025
Hard (i)

Slovakia
1

			1	2	3
1	(Croatia) (Slovakia)	Duje Ajduković; Lukáš Klein	7^{7} 6^{4}	6; 3
2	(Croatia) (Slovakia)	Dino Prižmić; Jozef Kovalík	6; 2	6; 2
3	(Croatia) (Slovakia)	Nikola Mektić / Mate Pavić; Miloš Karol / Lukáš Klein	7^{7} 6^{4}	7; 5
4	(Croatia) (Slovakia)	Matej Dodig; Norbert Gombos	4; 6	4; 6
5	(Croatia) (Slovakia)	Dino Prižmić; Lukáš Klein				not played

2025 Davis Cup Qualifiers second round

Croatia
1
Gradski vrt Hall, Osijek, Croatia
12–13 September 2025
Clay (i)

France
3

			1	2	3
1	(Croatia) (France)	Dino Prižmić; Corentin Moutet	4; 6	7; 5	1; 6
2	(Croatia) (France)	Marin Čilić; Arthur Rinderknech	2; 6	4; 6
3	(Croatia) (France)	Nikola Mektić / Mate Pavić; Benjamin Bonzi / Pierre-Hugues Herbert	6; 3	7; 5
4	(Croatia) (France)	Marin Čilić; Corentin Moutet	5; 7	4; 6
5	(Croatia) (France)	Dino Prižmić; Arthur Rinderknech				not played

=== 2026 ===
2026 Davis Cup Qualifiers first round

Croatia
3
Varaždin Arena, Varaždin, Croatia
6–7 February 2026
Hard (i)

Denmark
1

			1	2	3
1	(Croatia) (Denmark)	Matej Dodig; Elmer Møller	4; 6	6^{3} 7^{7}
2	(Croatia) (Denmark)	Dino Prižmić; August Holmgren	5; 7	6; 0	6; 2
3	(Croatia) (Denmark)	Nikola Mektić / Mate Pavić; Johannes Ingildsen / Carl Emil Overbeck	6; 2	7; 5
4	(Croatia) (Denmark)	Dino Prižmić; Elmer Møller	7^{7} 6^{5}	7^{7} 6^{2}
5	(Croatia) (Denmark)	Matej Dodig; August Holmgren				not played

2026 Davis Cup Qualifiers second round

Germany
3
Heristo Arena, Halle, Germany
19–20 September 2026
Hard (i)

Croatia
1

			1	2	3
1	(Germany) (Croatia)	Alexander Zverev; Matej Dodig	6; 4	7^{7} 6^{3}
2	(Germany) (Croatia)	Daniel Altmaier; Dino Prižmić	4; 6	3; 6
3	(Germany) (Croatia)	Kevin Krawietz / Tim Pütz; Nikola Mektić / Mate Pavić	7; 5	6; 2
4	(Germany) (Croatia)	Alexander Zverev; Dino Prižmić	6; 2	6; 4
5	(Germany) (Croatia)	Daniel Altmaier; Matej Dodig				not played

== Current team ==
The following players were called up for the 2026 Davis Cup Qualifiers second round tie against Germany.

Team nominations for Second Round Qualifier against Germany.
Player	Born	ATP ranking		Debut	Nom	Ties	Win-loss			ATP Profile
Player	Born	Singles	Doubles	Debut	Nom	Ties	Singles	Doubles	Total	ATP Profile
Dino Prižmić	5 August 2005 (age 21)	103	–	2023	5	6	4–4	–	4–4	
Matej Dodig	19 July 2005 (age 21)	171	555	2024	5	4	1–3	–	1–3	
Mili Poljičak	13 July 2004 (age 22)	290	178	2024	2	1	–	1–0	1–0	
Mate Pavić	4 July 1993 (age 33)	–	9	2013	17	20	0–1	12–11	12–12	
Nikola Mektić	24 December 1988 (age 37)	–	27	2011	14	19	1–2	12–5	13–7	

== Players ==
Key
	Players that have won the Davis cup
**Bold**	Players that are active for the national team
***	Still playing active tennis

Last updated: Croatia – Slovakia; 2 February 2025.

Player	W-L (Total)	W-L (Singles)	W-L (Doubles)	Ties	Career
**Duje Ajduković**	4–2	3–2	1–0	4	2023–
Mario Ančić ^{[A]}	21–13	13–11	8–2	18	1999–2009
Ivan Beroš	1–0	1–0	0–0	1	1999
Ivan Cerović	0–1	0–1	0–0	1	2006
**Marin Čilić** ^{[B]}	43–23	33–17	10–6	34	2006–
**Borna Ćorić** ^{[B]}	16–9	16–9	0–0	19	2013–
Mate Delić	1–4	1–4	0–0	3	2014–2015
Ivan Dodig ^{[B]}	12–18	2–7	10–11	22	2010–2024
**Matej Dodig**	1–1	1–1	0–0	2	2024–
Marin Draganja	2–3	0–1	2–2	5	2014–2017
Viktor Galović	1–1	1–1	0–0	2	2017–2018
**Borna Gojo**	9–6	9–6	0–0	15	2019–
Saša Hiršzon	11–12	6–8	5–4	9	1994–1998
Goran Ivanišević ^{[A]}	33–11	20–6	13–5	18	1993–2003
Roko Karanušić	2–6	2–5	0–1	6	2005–2009
Ivo Karlović ^{[A]}	13–14	9–10	4–4	15	2000–2016
Željko Krajan	1–2	1–2	0–0	3	1998–1999
Ivan Ljubičić ^{[A]}	36–19	23–13	13–6	22	1998–2010
**Nikola Mektić**	11–6	1–2	10–4	16	2011–
Goran Orešić	1–1	1–1	0–0	2	1996
Ante Pavić	0–1	0–1	0–0	1	2017
**Mate Pavić** ^{[B]}	10–11	0–1	10–10	20	2013–
Mili Poljičak***	1–0	0–0	1–0	1	2024–
**Dino Prižmić**	1–2	1–2	0–0	3	2023–
Goran Prpić	1–5	1–3	0–2	2	1993
Nino Serdarušić***	1–0	1–0	0–0	1	2021–
Igor Šarić	2–0	2–0	0–0	2	1994–1996
Franko Škugor ^{[B]}	3–5	1–3	2–2	6	2015–2020
Saša Tuksar	0–2	0–2	0–0	2	2004–2006
Ivan Vajda	0–1	0–1	0–0	1	2001
Antonio Veić	1–2	1–2	0–0	3	2010–2012
Lovro Zovko	6–9	5–2	1–7	10	1998-2009
Total	200–157	155–124	45–33	80	1993–2025

== Managers ==
Last updated: Croatia – Slovakia; 2 February 2025.

Name	Tenure	Ties	Won	Lost	Win %	Best Result
(Croatia) Bruno Orešar	1993	2	1	1	50%	1993 World Group, Qualifying round
(Croatia) Goran Prpić	1994	1	1	0	100%	1994 Europe/Africa Group I, Semifinals
(Croatia) Željko Franulović	1994–1997	7	3	4	43%	1995 World Group, First round
(Croatia) Goran Prpić	1998–2000	7	4	3	57%	1999 Europe/Africa Group I, Quarterfinals
(Croatia) Nikola Pilić	2001–2005	12	9	3	75%	2005 Champions
(Croatia) Ivan Ljubičić	2006	2	1	1	50%	2006 World Group, Quarterfinals
(Croatia) Goran Prpić	2007–2011	11	6	5	55%	2009 World Group, Semifinals
(Croatia) Željko Krajan	2012–2019	18	12	6	67%	2018 Champions
(Croatia) Franko Škugor	2019	2	0	2	0%	–
(Croatia) Vedran Martić	2019–2023	15	10	5	67%	2021 Final
(Croatia) Velimir Zovko	2024-present	3	2	1	67%	
Totals		80	49	31	61%	

== Davis Cup finals ==
Edition	Rounds/Opponents	Results
2005	1R: United States QF: Romania SF: Russia F: Slovakia	1R: 3–2 QF: 4–1 SF: 3–2 F: 3–2
2016	1R: Belgium QF: United States SF: France F: Argentina	1R: 3–2 QF: 3–2 SF: 3–2 F: 2–3
2018	1R: Canada QF: Kazakhstan SF: United States F: France	1R: 3–1 QF: 3–1 SF: 3–2 F: 3–1
2021	GS: Australia, Hungary QF: Italy SF: Serbia F: Russia	GS: 3–0, 2–1 QF: 2–1 SF: 2–1 F: 0–2

== List of matches ==
Here is the list of all match-ups since 1993, when Croatia started competing as a separate nation.

=== 1990s ===
Year	Competition	Date	Location	Opponent	Score	Result
1993	Europe/Africa Group I, Semifinals	30 Apr–2 May	Harare (ZIM)	Zimbabwe	3–2	Win
1993	World Group, Qualifying round	24 –26 Sep	Copenhagen (DEN)	Denmark	2–3	Loss
1994	Europe/Africa Group I, Semifinals	25–27 Mar	Zagreb (CRO)	Norway	3–2	Win
1994	World Group, Qualifying round	23–25 Sep	Porto (POR)	Portugal	4–0	Win
1995	World Group, First round	3–5 Feb	Karlsruhe (GER)	Germany	1–4	Loss
1995	World Group, Qualifying round	22–24 Sep	New Delhi (IND)	India	2–3	Loss
1996	Europe/Africa Group I, Quarterfinals	5–7 Feb	Dubrovnik (CRO)	Ukraine	5–0	Win
1996	World Group, Qualifying round	20–22 Sep	Split (CRO)	Australia	1–4	Loss
1997	Europe/Africa Group I, First round	7–9 Feb	Osijek (CRO)	Morocco	4–1	Win
1997	Europe/Africa Group I, Quarterfinals	4–6 Apr	Graz (AUT)	Austria	2–3	Loss
1998	Europe/Africa Group I, First round	13–15 Feb	Helsinki (FIN)	Finland	2–3	Loss
1998	Europe/Africa Group I, Relegation play-off	25–27 Sep	Oslo (NOR)	Norway	3–2	Win
1999	Europe/Africa Group I, Quarterfinals	2–4 Apr	Bucharest (ROU)	Romania	2–3	Loss
1999	Europe/Africa Group I, Relegation play-off	24–26 Sep	Zagreb (CRO)	Portugal	1–4	Loss

=== 2000s ===
Year	Competition	Date	Location	Opponent	Score	Result
2000	Europe/Africa Group II, First round	28–30 Apr	Jūrmala (LAT)	Latvia	5–0	Win
2000	Europe/Africa Group II, Quarterfinals	14–16 Jul	Dublin (IRL)	Ireland	5–0	Win
2000	Europe/Africa Group II, Semifinals	6–8 Oct	Rijeka (CRO)	Ivory Coast	5–0	Win
2001	Europe/Africa Group I, Quarterfinals	6–8 Apr	Pula (CRO)	Austria	4–1	Win
2001	World Group, Qualifying round	21–23 Sep	Rome (ITA)	Italy	3–2	Win
2002	World Group, First round	8–10 Feb	Zagreb (CRO)	Germany	4–1	Win
2002	World Group, Quarterfinals	5–7 Apr	Buenos Aires (ARG)	Argentina	2–3	Loss
2003	World Group, First round	7–9 Feb	Zagreb (CRO)	United States	4–1	Win
2003	World Group, Quarterfinals	4–6 Apr	Valencia (ESP)	Spain	0–5	Loss
2004	World Group, First round	6–8 Feb	Metz (FRA)	France	1–4	Loss
2004	World Group, Relegation play-off	24–26 Sep	Rijeka (CRO)	Belgium	3–2	Win
2005	World Group, First round	4–6 Mar	Los Angeles (USA)	United States	3–2	Win
2005	World Group, Quarterfinals	15–17 Jul	Split (CRO)	Romania	4–1	Win
2005	World Group, Semifinals	23–25 Sep	Split (CRO)	Russia	3–2	Win
2005	World Group, Finals	2–4 Dec	Bratislava (SVK)	Slovakia	3–2	Champion
2006	World Group, First round	10–12 Feb	Graz (AUT)	Austria	3–2	Win
2006	World Group, Quarterfinals	7–9 Apr	Zagreb (CRO)	Argentina	2–3	Loss
2007	World Group, First round	9–11 Feb	Krefeld (GER)	Germany	2–3	Loss
2007	World Group, Relegation play-off	21–23 Sep	London (GBR)	Great Britain	1–4	Loss
2008	Europe/Africa Group I, Second round	11–13 Apr	Dubrovnik (CRO)	Italy	3–2	Win
2008	World Group, Qualifying round	19–21 Sep	Zadar (CRO)	Brazil	4–1	Win
2009	World Group, First round	6–8 Mar	Poreč (CRO)	Chile	5–0	Win
2009	World Group, Quarterfinals	10–12 Jul	Poreč (CRO)	United States	3–2	Win
2009	World Group, Semifinals	18–20 Sep	Poreč (CRO)	Czech Republic	1–4	Loss

=== 2010s ===
Year	Competition	Date	Location	Opponent	Score	Result
2010	World Group, First round	5–7 Mar	Varaždin (CRO)	Ecuador	5–0	Win
2010	World Group, Quarterfinals	9–11 Jul	Split (CRO)	Serbia	1–4	Loss
2011	World Group, First round	4–6 Mar	Zagreb (CRO)	Germany	2–3	Loss
2011	World Group, Relegation play-off	16–18 Sep	Potchefstroom (RSA)	South Africa	4–1	Win
2012	World Group, First round	10–12 Feb	Miki (JPN)	Japan	3–2	Win
2012	World Group, Quarterfinals	6–8 Apr	Buenos Aires (ARG)	Argentina	1–4	Loss
2013	World Group, First round	1–3 Feb	Turin (ITA)	Italy	2–3	Loss
2013	World Group, Relegation play-off	13–15 Sep	Umag (CRO)	Great Britain	1–4	Loss
2014	Europe/Africa Group I, Second round	4–6 Apr	Warsaw (POL)	Poland	3–1	Win
2014	World Group, Promotion play-off	12–14 Sep	Amsterdam (NED)	Netherlands	3–2	Win
2015	World Group, First round	6–8 Mar	Kraljevo (SRB)	Serbia	0–5	Loss
2015	World Group, Relegation play-off	18–20 Sep	Florianópolis (BRA)	Brazil	3–1	Win
2016	World Group, First round	4–6 Mar	Liège (BEL)	Belgium	3–2	Win
2016	World Group, Quarterfinals	15–17 Jul	Beaverton (USA)	United States	3–2	Win
2016	World Group, Semifinals	16–18 Sep	Zadar (CRO)	France	3–2	Win
2016	World Group, Finals	25–27 Nov	Zagreb (CRO)	Argentina	2–3	Runner-up
2017	World Group, First Round	3–5 Feb	Osijek (CRO)	Spain	2–3	Loss
2017	World Group, Relegation play-off	15–17 Sep	Bogotá (COL)	Colombia	4–1	Win
2018	World Group, First Round	2–4 Feb	Osijek (CRO)	Canada	3–1	Win
2018	World Group, Quarterfinals	6–8 Apr	Varaždin (CRO)	Kazakhstan	3–1	Win
2018	World Group, Semifinals	14–16 Sep	Zadar (CRO)	United States	3–2	Win
2018	World Group, Finals	23–25 Nov	Lille (FRA)	France	3–1	Champion
2019	Finals, Group B	18 Nov	Madrid (ESP)	Russia	0–3	Loss
2019	Finals, Group B	20 Nov	Madrid (ESP)	Spain	0–3	Loss

=== 2020s ===
Year	Competition	Date	Location	Opponent	Score	Result
2020–21	Finals, Qualifying round	6–7 Mar 2020	Zagreb (CRO)	India	3–1	Win
2020–21	Finals, Group D	25 Nov 2021	Turin (ITA)	Australia	3–0	Win
2020–21	Finals, Group D	28 Nov	Turin (ITA)	Hungary	2–1	Win
2020–21	Finals, Quarterfinals	29 Nov	Turin (ITA)	Italy	2–1	Win
2020–21	Finals, Semifinals	3 Dec	Madrid (ESP)	Serbia	2–1	Win
2020–21	Finals, Final	5 Dec	Madrid (ESP)	Russia	0–2	Runner-up
2022	Finals, Group A	14 Sep	Bologna (ITA)	Italy	0–3	Loss
2022	Finals, Group A	15 Sep	Bologna (ITA)	Sweden	2–1	Win
2022	Finals, Group A	17 Sep	Bologna (ITA)	Argentina	3–0	Win
2022	Finals, Quarterfinals	23 Nov	Málaga (ESP)	Spain	2–0	Win
2022	Finals, Semifinals	25 Nov	Málaga (ESP)	Australia	1–2	Loss
2023	Finals, Qualifying round	4–5 Feb	Rijeka (CRO)	Austria	3–1	Win
2023	Finals, Group D	13 Sep	Split (CRO)	United States	1–2	Loss
2023	Finals, Group D	15 Sep	Split (CRO)	Finland	1–2	Loss
2023	Finals, Group D	17 Sep	Split (CRO)	Netherlands	2–1	Win
2024	Finals, Qualifying round	2–4 Feb	Varaždin (CRO)	Belgium	1–3	Loss
2024	World Group I	13–14 Sep	Varaždin (CRO)	Lithuania	4–0	Win
2025	Qualifiers first round	31 Jan–1 Feb	Osijek (CRO)	Slovakia	3–1	Win
2025	Qualifiers second round	12–13 Sep	Osijek (CRO)	France	1–3	Loss
2026	Qualifiers first round	6–7 Feb	Varaždin (CRO)	Denmark	3–1	Win
2026	Qualifiers second round	19–20 Sep	Halle (GER)	Germany	1–3	Loss

== Statistics ==
Last updated: Croatia – Slovakia; 2 February 2025

Record

- Champion: 2 times (2 times Away)
- Runner-up: 2 times
- Lost in Semifinals: 2 times
- Lost in Quarterfinals: 5 times
- Lost in First Round: 9 times
- Not in World Group / Finals: 11 times
- World Group Play-off: 8–5; Total Play-off: 9–6 *
- Performance at home: 24–12 (67%)
- Performance away: 20–16 (56%)
- Performance neutral: 5–3 (63%)
- Total: 49–31 (61%)

Head-to-head record (1993–)

DC team	Pld	W	L
Argentina	5	1	4
Australia	3	1	2
Austria	4	3	1
Belgium	3	2	1
Brazil	2	2	0
Canada	1	1	0
Chile	1	1	0
Colombia	1	1	0
Czech Republic	1	0	1
Denmark	1	0	1
Ecuador	1	1	0
Finland	2	0	2
France	3	2	1
Germany	4	1	3
Great Britain	2	0	2
Hungary	1	1	0
India	2	1	1
Ireland	1	1	0
Italy	5	3	2
Ivory Coast	1	1	0
Japan	1	1	0
Kazakhstan	1	1	0
Latvia	1	1	0
Lithuania	1	1	0
Morocco	1	1	0
Netherlands	2	2	0
Norway	2	2	0
Poland	1	1	0
Portugal	2	1	1
Romania	2	1	1
Russia	3	1	2
Serbia	3	1	2
South Africa	1	1	0
Slovakia	2	2	0
Spain	4	1	3
Sweden	1	1	0
Ukraine	1	1	0
United States	6	5	1
Zimbabwe	1	1	0
Total (38)	80	49	31

Record against continents

Africa	Asia	Europe	North America	Oceania	South America
Ivory Coast; Morocco; South Africa; Zimbabwe	India; Japan; Kazakhstan	Austria; Belgium; Czech Republic; Denmark; Finland; France; Germany; Great Britain; Hungary; Ireland; Italy; Latvia; Lithuania; Netherlands; Norway; Poland; Portugal; Romania; Russia; Serbia; Slovakia; Spain; Sweden; Ukraine	Canada; United States	Australia	Argentina; Brazil; Chile; Colombia; Ecuador
Record: 4-0 (100%)	Record: 3-1 (75%)	Record: 29-23 (56%)	Record: 6-1 (86%)	Record: 1-2 (33%)	Record: 6-4 (60%)

Record by decade

- 2020–2029: 12–6 (67%)
- 2010–2019: 14–10 (58%)
- 2000–2009: 17–7 (71%)
- 1993–1999: 6–8 (43%)

Has never played against 10 countries which, at one point or another, played in the World Group: Belarus, Cuba, Indonesia, Israel, Mexico, New Zealand, Paraguay, Peru, South Korea, Switzerland.

== See also ==
- Davis Cup
- Croatia Billie Jean King Cup team
- Croatia at the Hopman Cup
- World Team Cup
- Croatian Tennis Association

== Notes ==
- A ^{a} Won the Davis Cup in 2005.
- B ^{b} Won the Davis Cup in 2018.
