= 2025 Davis Cup Qualifiers second round =

Men's tennis tournament qualifiers

The 2025 Davis Cup qualifiers second round was held from 12 to 14 September 2025. The seven winners of this round qualified for the 2025 Davis Cup Finals (also known as the Final 8) while the seven losers will play at the 2026 Davis Cup Qualifiers first round.

== Teams ==
Fourteen teams played for seven spots in the Finals, in series decided on a home and away basis.

These fourteen teams were:

- The runners-up of the 2024 Davis Cup (Netherlands; promoted since 2024 champions Italy will host the Finals)
- 13 winners of the Qualifiers first round, held in January–February 2025

The 7 winning teams went on to play in the Finals alongside the host nation.

== Results summary ==
| Home team | Score | Away team | Location | Venue | Surface |
|---|---|---|---|---|---|
| Netherlands [1] | 1–3 | Argentina [14] | Groningen | MartiniPlaza | Hard (i) |
| Australia [2] | 2–3 | Belgium [13] | Sydney | Ken Rosewall Arena | Hard |
| Hungary | 2–3 | Austria | Debrecen | Főnix Aréna | Hard (i) |
| Japan | 0–4 | Germany [4] | Tokyo | Ariake Coliseum | Hard (i) |
| United States [5] | 2–3 | Czech Republic [10] | Delray Beach | Delray Beach Tennis Center | Hard |
| Spain [9] | 3–2 | Denmark | Marbella | Club de Tenis Puente Romano | Clay |
| Croatia [7] | 1–3 | France [8] | Osijek | Gradski vrt Hall | Clay (i) |

== Results ==
=== Netherlands vs. Argentina ===
Netherlands
1
MartiniPlaza, Groningen, Netherlands
12–13 September 2025
Hard (i)

Argentina
3

| | | | 1 | 2 | 3 |
|---|---|---|---|---|---|---|
| 1 | (Netherlands) (Argentina) | Jesper de Jong; Tomás Martín Etcheverry | 4; 6 | 4; 6 |
| 2 | (Netherlands) (Argentina) | Botic van de Zandschulp; Francisco Cerúndolo | 6^{4} 7^{7} | 1; 6 |
| 3 | (Netherlands) (Argentina) | Sander Arends / Botic van de Zandschulp; Andrés Molteni / Horacio Zeballos | 3; 6 | 5; 7 |
| 4 | (Netherlands) (Argentina) | Jesper de Jong; Francisco Comesaña | 6; 4 | 6; 3 |
| 5 | (Netherlands) (Argentina) | Botic van de Zandschulp; Tomás Martín Etcheverry | | | | not played |

=== Australia vs. Belgium ===
Australia
2
Ken Rosewall Arena, Sydney, Australia
13–14 September 2025
Hard

Belgium
3

| | | | 1 | 2 | 3 |
|---|---|---|---|---|---|
| 1 | (Australia) (Belgium) | Alex de Minaur; Raphaël Collignon | 5; 7 | 6; 3 | 3; 6 |
| 2 | (Australia) (Belgium) | Jordan Thompson; Zizou Bergs | 6^{4} 7^{7} | 4; 6 |
| 3 | (Australia) (Belgium) | Jordan Thompson / Rinky Hijikata; Sander Gillé / Joran Vliegen | 6^{7} 7^{9} | 6; 3 | 6; 4 |
| 4 | (Australia) (Belgium) | Alex de Minaur; Zizou Bergs | 6; 2 | 7; 5 |
| 5 | (Australia) (Belgium) | Aleksandar Vukic; Raphaël Collignon | 7^{7} 6^{5} | 2; 6 | 3; 6 |

=== Hungary vs. Austria ===
Hungary
2
Főnix Aréna, Debrecen, Hungary
12–13 September 2025
Hard (i)

Austria
3

| | | | 1 | 2 | 3 |
|---|---|---|---|---|---|
| 1 | (Hungary) (Austria) | Fábián Marozsán; Jurij Rodionov | 2; 6 | 7^{7} 6^{5} | 5; 7 |
| 2 | (Hungary) (Austria) | Márton Fucsovics; Lukas Neumayer | 3; 6 | 6; 3 | 6^{7} 7^{9} |
| 3 | (Hungary) (Austria) | Fábián Marozsán / Zsombor Piros; Alexander Erler / Lucas Miedler | 7^{7} 6^{4} | 7^{7} 6^{2} |
| 4 | (Hungary) (Austria) | Zsombor Piros; Lukas Neumayer | 7; 5 | 7^{8} 6^{6} |
| 5 | (Hungary) (Austria) | Márton Fucsovics; Jurij Rodionov | 2; 6 | 1; 6 |

=== Japan vs. Germany ===
Japan
0
Ariake Coliseum, Tokyo, Japan
12–13 September 2025
Hard (i)

Germany
4

| | | | 1 | 2 | 3 |
|---|---|---|---|---|---|---|
| 1 | (Japan) (Germany) | Yoshihito Nishioka; Jan-Lennard Struff | 4; 6 | 7^{7} 6^{4} | 4; 6 |
| 2 | (Japan) (Germany) | Shintaro Mochizuki; Yannick Hanfmann | 3; 6 | 3; 6 |
| 3 | (Japan) (Germany) | Yosuke Watanuki / Takeru Yuzuki; Kevin Krawietz / Tim Pütz | 3; 6 | 6^{4} 7^{7} |
| 4 | (Japan) (Germany) | Rei Sakamoto; Justin Engel | 3; 6 | 7^{7} 6^{2} | 7; 10 |
| 5 | (Japan) (Germany) | Yoshihito Nishioka; Yannick Hanfmann | | | | not played |

=== United States vs. Czech Republic ===
United States
2
Delray Beach Tennis Center, Delray Beach, United States
12–13 September 2025
Hard

Czech Republic
3

| | | | 1 | 2 | 3 |
|---|---|---|---|---|---|
| 1 | (United States) (Czech Republic) | Frances Tiafoe; Jiří Lehečka | 3; 6 | 2; 6 |
| 2 | (United States) (Czech Republic) | Taylor Fritz; Jakub Menšík | 6; 4 | 6; 3 |
| 3 | (United States) (Czech Republic) | Austin Krajicek / Rajeev Ram; Tomáš Macháč / Jakub Menšík | 7^{8} 6^{6} | 5; 7 | 6; 4 |
| 4 | (United States) (Czech Republic) | Taylor Fritz; Jiří Lehečka | 4; 6 | 6; 3 | 4; 6 |
| 5 | (United States) (Czech Republic) | Frances Tiafoe; Jakub Menšík | 1; 6 | 4; 6 |

=== Spain vs. Denmark ===
Spain
3
Club de Tenis Puente Romano, Marbella, Spain
13–14 September 2025
Clay

Denmark
2

| | | | 1 | 2 | 3 |
|---|---|---|---|---|---|
| 1 | (Spain) (Denmark) | Pablo Carreño Busta; Holger Rune | 5; 7 | 3; 6 |
| 2 | (Spain) (Denmark) | Jaume Munar; Elmer Møller | 6; 2 | 1; 6 | 4; 6 |
| 3 | (Spain) (Denmark) | Pedro Martínez / Jaume Munar; August Holmgren / Johannes Ingildsen | 1; 6 | 6; 3 | 6; 2 |
| 4 | (Spain) (Denmark) | Pedro Martínez; Holger Rune | 6; 1 | 4; 6 | 7^{7} 6^{3} |
| 5 | (Spain) (Denmark) | Pablo Carreño Busta; Elmer Møller | 6; 2 | 6; 3 |

=== Croatia vs. France ===
Croatia
1
Gradski vrt Hall, Osijek, Croatia
12–13 September 2025
Clay (i)

France
3

| | | | 1 | 2 | 3 |
|---|---|---|---|---|---|---|
| 1 | (Croatia) (France) | Dino Prižmić; Corentin Moutet | 4; 6 | 7; 5 | 1; 6 |
| 2 | (Croatia) (France) | Marin Čilić; Arthur Rinderknech | 2; 6 | 4; 6 |
| 3 | (Croatia) (France) | Nikola Mektić / Mate Pavić; Benjamin Bonzi / Pierre-Hugues Herbert | 6; 3 | 7; 5 |
| 4 | (Croatia) (France) | Marin Čilić; Corentin Moutet | 5; 7 | 4; 6 |
| 5 | (Croatia) (France) | Dino Prižmić; Arthur Rinderknech | | | | not played |
