= 2016 Davis Cup World Group =

2016 edition of the Davis Cup World Group

- Date: 4 March – 27 November
- Edition: 36th

Champions
- Argentina
- Davis Cup

The World Group was the highest level of Davis Cup competition in 2016. The first-round losers went into the Davis Cup World Group play-offs, and the winners progressed to the quarterfinals and World Group spot for 2017.

== Participating teams ==
Participating teams
Argentina	Australia	Belgium	Canada
Croatia	Czech Republic	France	Germany
Great Britain	Italy	Kazakhstan	Japan
Poland	Serbia	Switzerland	United States

=== Seeds ===
1. Great Britain (semifinals)
2. Belgium (first round)
3. Czech Republic (quarterfinals)
4. Switzerland (first round)
5. France (semifinals)
6. Argentina (champions)
7. Serbia (quarterfinals)
8. Australia (first round)

=== Draw ===
First round 4–6 March
Birmingham, Great Britain (indoor hard)
1	Great Britain	3
Japan	1
Belgrade, Serbia (indoor hard)
7	Serbia	3
Kazakhstan	2
Pesaro, Italy (indoor clay)
4	Switzerland	0
Italy	5
Gdańsk, Poland (indoor hard)
6	Argentina	3
Poland	2
Baie-Mahault, Guadeloupe, France (clay)
Canada	0
5	France	5
Hannover, Germany (indoor hard)
Germany	2
3	Czech Republic	3
Kooyong, Australia (grass)
United States	3
8	Australia	1
Liège, Belgium (indoor clay)
Croatia	3
2	Belgium	2

Quarterfinals; 15–17 July
Belgrade, Serbia (clay)
1	Great Britain	3
7	Serbia	2
Pesaro, Italy (clay)
Italy	1
6	Argentina	3
Třinec, Czech Republic (indoor hard)
5	France	3
3	Czech Republic	1
Beaverton, United States (hard)
United States	2
Croatia	3

Semifinals; 16–18 September
Glasgow, Great Britain (indoor hard)
1	Great Britain	2
6	Argentina	3
Zadar, Croatia (indoor hard)
5	France	2
Croatia	3

Final; 25–27 November
Zagreb, Croatia (indoor hard)
6	Argentina	3
Croatia	2

== First round ==
=== Great Britain vs. Japan ===
Great Britain
3
Barclaycard Arena, Birmingham, Great Britain
4–6 March 2016
Hard (i)

Japan
1

			1	2	3	4	5
1	(United Kingdom) (Japan)	Andy Murray; Taro Daniel	6; 1	6; 3	6; 1
2	(United Kingdom) (Japan)	Daniel Evans; Kei Nishikori	3; 6	5; 7	6^{3} 7^{7}
3	(United Kingdom) (Japan)	Andy Murray / Jamie Murray; Yoshihito Nishioka / Yasutaka Uchiyama	6; 3	6; 2	6; 4
4	(United Kingdom) (Japan)	Andy Murray; Kei Nishikori	7; 5	7^{8} 6^{6}	3; 6	4; 6	6; 3
5	(United Kingdom) (Japan)	Daniel Evans; Taro Daniel						not played

Murray's win over Nishikori was the joint longest match of his career at 4 hours and 54 minutes, along with the 2012 US Open final, until his davis cup semi-final tie with Del Potro.

=== Serbia vs. Kazakhstan ===
Serbia
3
Pionir Hall, Belgrade, Serbia
4–6 March 2016
Hard (i)

Kazakhstan
2

			1	2	3	4	5
1	(Serbia) (Kazakhstan)	Novak Djokovic; Aleksandr Nedovyesov	6; 1	6; 2	6; 3
2	(Serbia) (Kazakhstan)	Viktor Troicki; Mikhail Kukushkin	5; 7	2; 6	4; 6
3	(Serbia) (Kazakhstan)	Novak Djokovic / Nenad Zimonjić; Andrey Golubev / Aleksandr Nedovyesov	3; 6	6^{3} 7^{7}	5; 7
4	(Serbia) (Kazakhstan)	Novak Djokovic; Mikhail Kukushkin	6^{6} 7^{8}	7^{7} 6^{3}	4; 6	6; 3	6; 2
5	(Serbia) (Kazakhstan)	Viktor Troicki; Aleksandr Nedovyesov	6; 2	6; 3	6; 4

=== Italy vs. Switzerland ===
Italy
5
Adriatic Arena, Pesaro, Italy
4–6 March 2016
Clay (i)

Switzerland
0

			1	2	3	4	5
1	(Italy) (Switzerland)	Paolo Lorenzi; Marco Chiudinelli	7^{16} 6^{14}	6; 3	4; 6	5; 7	7; 5
2	(Italy) (Switzerland)	Andreas Seppi; Henri Laaksonen	7; 5	7^{7} 6^{4}	3; 6	6; 3
3	(Italy) (Switzerland)	Simone Bolelli / Andreas Seppi; Marco Chiudinelli / Henri Laaksonen	6; 3	6; 1	6; 3
4	(Italy) (Switzerland)	Marco Cecchinato; Adrien Bossel	6; 3	7; 5
5	(Italy) (Switzerland)	Paolo Lorenzi; Antoine Bellier	6; 3	6; 2

=== Poland vs. Argentina ===
Poland
2
Ergo Arena, Gdańsk, Poland
4–6 March 2016
Hard (i)

Argentina
3

			1	2	3	4	5
1	(Poland) (Argentina)	Michał Przysiężny; Guido Pella	1; 6	4; 6	6^{5} 7^{7}
2	(Poland) (Argentina)	Hubert Hurkacz; Leonardo Mayer	2; 6	6^{3} 7^{7}	2; 6
3	(Poland) (Argentina)	Łukasz Kubot / Marcin Matkowski; Carlos Berlocq / Renzo Olivo	6; 3	6; 4	6; 4
4	(Poland) (Argentina)	Michał Przysiężny; Leonardo Mayer	7^{7} 6^{4}	6^{4} 7^{7}	2; 6	3; 6
5	(Poland) (Argentina)	Hubert Hurkacz; Renzo Olivo	4; 6	7^{8} 6^{6}	6; 4

=== France vs. Canada ===
France
5
Vélodrome Amédée Détraux, Baie-Mahault, Guadeloupe, France
4–6 March 2016
Clay

Canada
0

			1	2	3	4	5
1	(France) (Canada)	Gaël Monfils; Frank Dancevic	6; 3	6; 1	6; 3
2	(France) (Canada)	Gilles Simon; Vasek Pospisil	7; 5	6; 3	6; 3
3	(France) (Canada)	Richard Gasquet / Jo-Wilfried Tsonga; Philip Bester / Vasek Pospisil	7^{7} 6^{4}	6; 1	7^{7} 6^{4}
4	(France) (Canada)	Richard Gasquet; Philip Bester	6; 1	7^{7} 6^{4}
5	(France) (Canada)	Jo-Wilfried Tsonga; Frank Dancevic	6^{7} 7^{9}					retired

=== Germany vs. Czech Republic ===
Germany
2
TUI Arena, Hannover, Germany
4–6 March 2016
Hard (i)

Czech Republic
3

			1	2	3	4	5
1	(Germany) (Czech Republic)	Philipp Kohlschreiber; Lukáš Rosol	3; 6	6; 3	6; 4	2; 6	6; 3
2	(Germany) (Czech Republic)	Alexander Zverev; Tomáš Berdych	6^{6} 7^{8}	6; 1	6; 4	6^{5} 7^{7}	4; 6
3	(Germany) (Czech Republic)	Philipp Kohlschreiber / Philipp Petzschner; Tomáš Berdych / Radek Štěpánek	6^{7} 7^{9}	5; 7	4; 6
4	(Germany) (Czech Republic)	Philipp Kohlschreiber; Tomáš Berdych	6; 3	7; 5				retired
5	(Germany) (Czech Republic)	Alexander Zverev; Lukáš Rosol	2; 6	3; 6	1; 6

=== Australia vs. United States ===
Australia
1
Kooyong Stadium, Melbourne, Australia
4–6 March 2016
Grass

United States
3

			1	2	3	4	5
1	(Australia) (United States)	Sam Groth; John Isner	6^{2} 7^{7}	2; 6	2; 6
2	(Australia) (United States)	Bernard Tomic; Jack Sock	7^{7} 6^{2}	6; 3	3; 6	6; 4
3	(Australia) (United States)	Lleyton Hewitt / John Peers; Bob Bryan / Mike Bryan	3; 6	3; 6	6; 4	6; 4	3; 6
4	(Australia) (United States)	Bernard Tomic; John Isner	4; 6	4; 6	7; 5	6^{4} 7^{7}
5	(Australia) (United States)	Sam Groth; Jack Sock						not played

=== Belgium vs. Croatia ===
Belgium
2
Country Hall Ethias Liège, Liège, Belgium
4–6 March 2016
Clay (i)

Croatia
3

			1	2	3	4	5
1	(Belgium) (Croatia)	Kimmer Coppejans; Marin Čilić	5; 7	3; 6	5; 7
2	(Belgium) (Croatia)	David Goffin; Borna Ćorić	6; 3	6; 2	2; 6	3; 6	6; 3
3	(Belgium) (Croatia)	Ruben Bemelmans / David Goffin; Ivan Dodig / Franko Škugor	6^{5} 7^{7}	3; 6	1; 6
4	(Belgium) (Croatia)	David Goffin; Marin Čilić	6; 4	6; 4	3; 6	7; 5
5	(Belgium) (Croatia)	Kimmer Coppejans; Borna Ćorić	6^{5} 7^{7}	2; 6	2; 6

== Quarterfinals ==
=== Serbia vs. Great Britain ===
Serbia
2
Tašmajdan Stadium, Belgrade, Serbia
15–17 July 2016
Clay

Great Britain
3

			1	2	3	4	5
1	(Serbia) (United Kingdom)	Janko Tipsarević; Kyle Edmund	3; 6	4; 6	0; 6
2	(Serbia) (United Kingdom)	Dušan Lajović; James Ward	6; 1	6; 3	6; 2
3	(Serbia) (United Kingdom)	Filip Krajinović / Nenad Zimonjić; Dominic Inglot / Jamie Murray	1; 6	7^{7} 6^{2}	3; 6	4; 6
4	(Serbia) (United Kingdom)	Dušan Lajović; Kyle Edmund	3; 6	4; 6	6^{5} 7^{7}
5	(Serbia) (United Kingdom)	Janko Tipsarević; James Ward	6; 2	3; 6	7; 5

=== Italy vs. Argentina ===
Italy
1
Circolo Tennis Baratoff, Pesaro, Italy
15–17 July 2016
Clay

Argentina
3

			1	2	3	4	5
1	(Italy) (Argentina)	Andreas Seppi; Federico Delbonis	6^{4} 7^{7}	6; 3	3; 6	6^{3} 7^{7}
2	(Italy) (Argentina)	Fabio Fognini; Juan Mónaco	6; 1	6; 1	7; 5
3	(Italy) (Argentina)	Fabio Fognini / Paolo Lorenzi; Juan Martín del Potro / Guido Pella	1; 6	6^{4} 7^{7}	6; 3	6; 3	4; 6
4	(Italy) (Argentina)	Fabio Fognini; Federico Delbonis	4; 6	5; 7	6; 3	5; 7
5	(Italy) (Argentina)	Andreas Seppi; Juan Mónaco						not played

=== Czech Republic vs. France ===
Czech Republic
1
Werk Arena, Třinec, Czech Republic
15–17 July 2016
Hard (i)

France
3

			1	2	3	4	5
1	(Czech Republic) (France)	Lukáš Rosol; Jo-Wilfried Tsonga	6; 4	3; 6	4; 6	7^{10} 6^{8}	6; 4
2	(Czech Republic) (France)	Jiří Veselý; Lucas Pouille	6^{2} 7^{7}	4; 6	5; 7
3	(Czech Republic) (France)	Lukáš Rosol / Radek Štěpánek; Pierre-Hugues Herbert / Nicolas Mahut	1; 6	6; 3	3; 6	6; 4	4; 6
4	(Czech Republic) (France)	Jiří Veselý; Jo-Wilfried Tsonga	6; 4	6^{3} 7^{7}	4; 6	5; 7
5	(Czech Republic) (France)	Lukáš Rosol; Lucas Pouille						not played

=== United States vs. Croatia ===
United States
2
Howard M. Terpenning Recreation Complex, Beaverton, United States
15–17 July 2016
Hard

Croatia
3

			1	2	3	4	5
1	(United States) (Croatia)	Jack Sock; Marin Čilić	4; 6	3; 6	6; 3	6; 4	6; 4
2	(United States) (Croatia)	John Isner; Borna Ćorić	6; 4	6; 4	6; 3
3	(United States) (Croatia)	Bob Bryan / Mike Bryan; Marin Čilić / Ivan Dodig	2; 6	6; 2	2; 6	4; 6
4	(United States) (Croatia)	John Isner; Marin Čilić	6^{9} 7^{11}	3; 6	4; 6
5	(United States) (Croatia)	Jack Sock; Borna Ćorić	4; 6	6; 3	3; 6	4; 6

== Semifinals ==
=== Great Britain vs. Argentina ===
Great Britain
2
Commonwealth Arena, Glasgow, Great Britain
16–18 September 2016
Hard (i)

Argentina
3

			1	2	3	4	5
1	(United Kingdom) (Argentina)	Andy Murray; Juan Martín del Potro	4; 6	7; 5	7^{7} 6^{5}	3; 6	4; 6
2	(United Kingdom) (Argentina)	Kyle Edmund; Guido Pella	7^{7} 6^{5}	4; 6	3; 6	2; 6
3	(United Kingdom) (Argentina)	Andy Murray / Jamie Murray; Juan Martín del Potro / Leonardo Mayer	6; 1	3; 6	6; 4	6; 4
4	(United Kingdom) (Argentina)	Andy Murray; Guido Pella	6; 3	6; 2	6; 3
5	(United Kingdom) (Argentina)	Daniel Evans; Leonardo Mayer	6; 4	3; 6	2; 6	4; 6

=== Croatia vs. France ===
Croatia
3
Krešimir Ćosić Hall, Zadar, Croatia
16–18 September 2016
Hard (i)

France
2

			1	2	3	4	5
1	(Croatia) (France)	Borna Ćorić; Richard Gasquet	2; 6	6^{5} 7^{7}	1; 6
2	(Croatia) (France)	Marin Čilić; Lucas Pouille	6; 1	7^{7} 6^{4}	2; 6	6; 2
3	(Croatia) (France)	Marin Čilić / Ivan Dodig; Pierre-Hugues Herbert / Nicolas Mahut	7^{8} 6^{6}	5; 7	7^{8} 6^{6}	6; 3
4	(Croatia) (France)	Marin Čilić; Richard Gasquet	6; 3	6; 2	7; 5
5	(Croatia) (France)	Marin Draganja; Lucas Pouille	4; 6	4; 6

== Final ==
=== Croatia vs. Argentina ===
Croatia
2
Arena Zagreb, Zagreb, Croatia
25–27 November 2016
Hard (i)

Argentina
3

			1	2	3	4	5
1	(Croatia) (Argentina)	Marin Čilić; Federico Delbonis	6; 3	7; 5	3; 6	1; 6	6; 2
2	(Croatia) (Argentina)	Ivo Karlović; Juan Martín del Potro	4; 6	7^{8} 6^{6}	3; 6	5; 7
3	(Croatia) (Argentina)	Marin Čilić / Ivan Dodig; Juan Martín del Potro / Leonardo Mayer	7^{7} 6^{2}	7^{7} 6^{4}	6; 3
4	(Croatia) (Argentina)	Marin Čilić; Juan Martín del Potro	7^{7} 6^{4}	6; 2	5; 7	4; 6	3; 6
5	(Croatia) (Argentina)	Ivo Karlović; Federico Delbonis	3; 6	4; 6	2; 6
