= 2025 Davis Cup Qualifiers first round =

Men's tennis tournament qualifiers

The 2025 Davis Cup qualifiers first round were held from 30 January to 2 February 2025. The thirteen winners of this round qualified for the 2025 Davis Cup Qualifiers second round while the thirteen losers will play at the 2025 Davis Cup World Group I.

== Teams ==
Twenty-six teams will play for thirteen spots in the Qualifiers second round, in series decided on a home and away basis.

These twenty-six teams are:

- 14 teams ranked 2nd–16th in the 2024 Finals, excluding the host nation (Italy) for the Finals and wildcard team (Netherlands)
- 12 winning teams from the 2024 World Group I

The 13 winning teams will play at the Qualifiers second round and the 13 losing teams will play at the World Group I.

#: Nations Ranking as of 25 November 2024.

Seeded teams

1. Australia (#2)
2. Canada (#3)
3. Germany (#5)
4. United States (#6)
5. Serbia (#7)
6. Croatia (#8)
7. France (#9)
8. Spain (#10)
9. Czech Republic (#11)
10. Great Britain (#12)
11. Finland (#13)
12. Belgium (#14)
13. Argentina (#15)

Unseeded teams

- Chile (#16)
- Brazil (#17)
- Slovakia (#18)
- South Korea (#19)
- Sweden (#20)
- Hungary (#22)
- Switzerland (#23)
- Austria (#24)
- Denmark (#25)
- Chinese Taipei (#27)
- Israel (#28)
- Japan (#29)
- Norway (#31)

== Results summary ==
Home team	Score	Away team	Location	Venue	Surface
Sweden	1–3	Australia [2]	Stockholm	Kungliga Tennishallen	Hard (i)
Canada [3]	2–3	Hungary	Montreal	IGA Stadium	Hard (i)
Israel	1–3	Germany [4]	Vilnius (Lithuania)	SEB Arena	Hard (i)
Chinese Taipei	0–4	United States [5]	Taipei	Taipei Tennis Center	Hard (i)
Denmark	3–2	Serbia [6]	Copenhagen	Royal Arena	Hard (i)
Croatia [7]	3–1	Slovakia	Osijek	Gradski vrt Hall	Hard (i)
France [8]	4–0	Brazil	Orléans	Palais des Sports	Hard (i)
Switzerland	1–3	Spain [9]	Biel/Bienne	Swiss Tennis Arena	Hard (i)
Czech Republic [10]	4–0	South Korea	Ostrava	RT Torax Arena	Hard (i)
Japan	3–2	Great Britain [11]	Miki	Bourbon Beans Dome	Hard (i)
Austria	4–0	Finland [12]	Schwechat	Multiversum Schwechat	Clay (i)
Belgium [13]	3–1	Chile	Hasselt	Sporthal Alverberg	Hard (i)
Norway	2–3	Argentina [14]	Fjellhamar	Fjellhamar Arena	Hard (i)

== Results ==
=== Sweden vs. Australia ===
Sweden
1
Kungliga Tennishallen, Stockholm, Sweden
31 January–1 February 2025
Hard (i)

Australia
3

			1	2	3
1	(Sweden) (Australia)	Mikael Ymer; Alex de Minaur	5; 7	1; 6
2	(Sweden) (Australia)	Leo Borg; Aleksandar Vukic	4; 6	4; 6
3	(Sweden) (Australia)	Filip Bergevi / André Göransson; Matthew Ebden / John Peers	7^{9} 6^{7}	3; 6	2; 6
4	(Sweden) (Australia)	Leo Borg; John Peers	7; 5	6; 4
5	(Sweden) (Australia)	Mikael Ymer; Aleksandar Vukic				not played

=== Canada vs. Hungary ===
Canada
2
IGA Stadium, Montreal, Canada
1–2 February 2025
Hard (i)

Hungary
3

			1	2	3
1	(Canada) (Hungary)	Alexis Galarneau; Fábián Marozsán	3; 6	6; 3	3; 6
2	(Canada) (Hungary)	Gabriel Diallo; Márton Fucsovics	6; 3	2; 6	2; 6
3	(Canada) (Hungary)	Liam Draxl / Vasek Pospisil; Peter Fajta / Máté Valkusz	7^{7} 6^{2}	6; 4
4	(Canada) (Hungary)	Gabriel Diallo; Fábián Marozsán	6; 1	6; 3
5	(Canada) (Hungary)	Alexis Galarneau; Márton Fucsovics	6^{8} 7^{10}	4; 6

=== Israel vs. Germany ===
Israel
1
SEB Arena, Vilnius, Lithuania
31 January–1 February 2025
Hard (i)

Germany
3

			1	2	3
1	(Israel) (Germany)	Yshai Oliel; Maximilian Marterer	2; 6	7; 5	4; 6
2	(Israel) (Germany)	Daniel Cukierman; Yannick Hanfmann	4; 6	4; 6
3	(Israel) (Germany)	Daniel Cukierman / Amit Vales; Kevin Krawietz / Tim Pütz	0; 6	3; 6
4	(Israel) (Germany)	Ofek Shimanov; Daniel Masur	6^{2} 7^{7}	6; 3	10; 8
5	(Israel) (Germany)	Daniel Cukierman; Maximilian Marterer				not played

=== Chinese Taipei vs. United States ===
Chinese Taipei
0
Taipei Tennis Center, Taipei, Chinese Taipei
31 January–1 February 2025
Hard (i)

United States
4

			1	2	3
1	(Chinese Taipei) (United States)	Tseng Chun-hsin; Marcos Giron	2; 6	2; 6
2	(Chinese Taipei) (United States)	Wu Tung-lin; Alex Michelsen	6^{4} 7^{7}	3; 6
3	(Chinese Taipei) (United States)	Ray Ho / Wu Tung-lin; Austin Krajicek / Rajeev Ram	4; 6	6^{4} 7^{7}
4	(Chinese Taipei) (United States)	Huang Tsung-hao; Mackenzie McDonald	2; 6	3; 6
5	(Chinese Taipei) (United States)	Wu Tung-lin; Marcos Giron				not played

=== Denmark vs. Serbia ===
Denmark
3
Royal Arena, Copenhagen, Denmark
31 January–1 February 2025
Hard (i)

Serbia
2

			1	2	3
1	(Denmark) (Serbia)	Elmer Møller; Miomir Kecmanović	6; 3	2; 6	1; 6
2	(Denmark) (Serbia)	Holger Rune; Hamad Medjedovic	6; 2	3; 6	1; 6
3	(Denmark) (Serbia)	Johannes Ingildsen / Holger Rune; Miomir Kecmanović / Hamad Medjedovic	6; 4	6; 4
4	(Denmark) (Serbia)	Holger Rune; Miomir Kecmanović	6; 2	6; 4
5	(Denmark) (Serbia)	Elmer Møller; Hamad Medjedovic	1; 6	6; 4	6; 3

=== Croatia vs. Slovakia ===
Croatia
3
Gradski vrt Hall, Osijek, Croatia
31 January–1 February 2025
Hard (i)

Slovakia
1

			1	2	3
1	(Croatia) (Slovakia)	Duje Ajduković; Lukáš Klein	7^{7} 6^{4}	6; 3
2	(Croatia) (Slovakia)	Dino Prižmić; Jozef Kovalík	6; 2	6; 2
3	(Croatia) (Slovakia)	Nikola Mektić / Mate Pavić; Miloš Karol / Lukáš Klein	7^{7} 6^{4}	7; 5
4	(Croatia) (Slovakia)	Matej Dodig; Norbert Gombos	4; 6	4; 6
5	(Croatia) (Slovakia)	Dino Prižmić; Lukáš Klein				not played

=== France vs. Brazil ===
France
4
Palais des Sports, Orléans, France
1–2 February 2025
Hard (i)

Brazil
0

			1	2	3
1	(France) (Brazil)	Ugo Humbert; João Fonseca	7; 5	6; 3
2	(France) (Brazil)	Arthur Fils; Thiago Seyboth Wild	6; 1	6; 4
3	(France) (Brazil)	Benjamin Bonzi / Pierre-Hugues Herbert; Rafael Matos / Marcelo Melo	4; 6	6; 3	6; 4
4	(France) (Brazil)	Giovanni Mpetshi Perricard; Matheus Pucinelli de Almeida	6; 4	6; 4
5	(France) (Brazil)	Arthur Fils; João Fonseca				not played

=== Switzerland vs. Spain ===
Switzerland
1
Swiss Tennis Arena, Biel, Switzerland
1–2 February 2025
Hard (i)

Spain
3

			1	2	3
1	(Switzerland) (Spain)	Dominic Stricker; Pedro Martínez	4; 6	6^{7} 7^{9}
2	(Switzerland) (Spain)	Jérôme Kym; Roberto Carballés Baena	4; 6	4; 6
3	(Switzerland) (Spain)	Marc-Andrea Hüsler / Dominic Stricker; Pedro Martínez / Jaume Munar	4; 6	5; 7
4	(Switzerland) (Spain)	Rémy Bertola; Martín Landaluce	6^{2} 7^{7}	6; 3	16; 14
5	(Switzerland) (Spain)	Dominic Stricker; Roberto Carballés Baena				not played

=== Czech Republic vs. South Korea ===
Czech Republic
4
RT Torax Arena, Ostrava, Czech Republic
31 January–1 February 2025
Hard (i)

South Korea
0

			1	2	3
1	(Czech Republic) (South Korea)	Jiří Lehečka; Gerard Campaña Lee	6; 3	6; 3
2	(Czech Republic) (South Korea)	Tomáš Macháč; Kwon Soon-woo	6; 2	6; 2
3	(Czech Republic) (South Korea)	Tomáš Macháč / Jakub Menšík; Chung Yun-seong / Nam Ji-sung	6; 3	6; 1
4	(Czech Republic) (South Korea)	Maxim Mrva; Shin San-hui	7^{7} 6^{4}	7^{7} 6^{5}
5	(Czech Republic) (South Korea)	Tomáš Macháč; Gerard Campaña Lee				not played

=== Japan vs. Great Britain ===
Japan
3
Bourbon Beans Dome, Miki, Japan
31 January–1 February 2025
Hard (i)

Great Britain
2

			1	2	3
1	(Japan) (United Kingdom)	Yoshihito Nishioka; Billy Harris	7; 5	6; 1
2	(Japan) (United Kingdom)	Kei Nishikori; Jacob Fearnley	3; 6	3; 6
3	(Japan) (United Kingdom)	Yosuke Watanuki / Takeru Yuzuki; Joe Salisbury / Neal Skupski	6^{3} 7^{7}	6^{4} 7^{7}
4	(Japan) (United Kingdom)	Yoshihito Nishioka; Jacob Fearnley	6; 3	7^{7} 6^{0}
5	(Japan) (United Kingdom)	Kei Nishikori; Billy Harris	6; 2	6; 3

=== Austria vs. Finland ===
Austria
4
Multiversum, Schwechat, Austria
31 January–1 February 2025
Clay (i)

Finland
0

			1	2	3
1	(Austria) (Finland)	Lukas Neumayer; Otto Virtanen	6; 4	6^{4} 7^{7}	6; 3
2	(Austria) (Finland)	Jurij Rodionov; Eero Vasa	2; 6	6; 3	6; 3
3	(Austria) (Finland)	Alexander Erler / Lucas Miedler; Patrick Kaukovalta / Patrik Niklas-Salminen	4; 6	7^{9} 6^{7}	7^{8} 6^{6}
4	(Austria) (Finland)	Filip Misolic; Eero Vasa	6; 4	6; 0
5	(Austria) (Finland)	Lukas Neumayer; Eero Vasa				not played

=== Belgium vs. Chile ===
Belgium
3
Sporthal Alverberg, Hasselt, Belgium
1–2 February 2025
Hard (i)

Chile
1

			1	2	3
1	(Belgium) (Chile)	Zizou Bergs; Tomás Barrios Vera	6; 4	6; 3
2	(Belgium) (Chile)	Alexander Blockx; Cristian Garín	6^{6} 7^{8}	1; 6
3	(Belgium) (Chile)	Sander Gillé / Joran Vliegen; Tomás Barrios Vera / Nicolás Jarry	6; 3	3; 6	6; 3
4	(Belgium) (Chile)	Zizou Bergs; Cristian Garín	6; 3	4; 6	7; 5
5	(Belgium) (Chile)	Alexander Blockx; Tomás Barrios Vera				not played

=== Norway vs. Argentina ===
Norway
2
Fjellhamar Arena, Fjellhamar, Norway
30 January–31 January 2025
Hard (i)

Argentina
3

			1	2	3
1	(Norway) (Argentina)	Nicolai Budkov Kjær; Tomás Martín Etcheverry	5; 7	6; 2	6^{5} 7^{7}
2	(Norway) (Argentina)	Casper Ruud; Mariano Navone	6; 3	6; 3
3	(Norway) (Argentina)	Viktor Durasovic / Casper Ruud; Andrés Molteni / Horacio Zeballos	2; 6	5; 7
4	(Norway) (Argentina)	Casper Ruud; Tomás Martín Etcheverry	6; 3	6; 3
5	(Norway) (Argentina)	Nicolai Budkov Kjær; Mariano Navone	6; 4	3; 6	4; 6
