= 2018 Davis Cup World Group =

2018 edition of the Davis Cup tennis tournament World Group

- Date: 2 February – 25 November
- Edition: 38th

Champions
- Croatia
- Davis Cup

The World Group is the highest level of Davis Cup competition in 2018. The first-round losers will play in the Davis Cup World Group play-offs.

== Participating teams ==
Participating teams
Australia	Belgium	Canada	Croatia
France	Germany	Great Britain	Hungary
Italy	Japan	Kazakhstan	Netherlands
Serbia	Spain	Switzerland	United States

=== Seeds ===
1. France (final)
2. Belgium (quarterfinals)
3. Great Britain (first round)
4. Croatia (champion)
5. Switzerland (first round)
6. Australia (first round)
7. Serbia (first round)
8. Italy (quarterfinals)

=== Draw ===
First round 2–4 February
Albertville, France (indoor hard)
1	France	3
Netherlands	1
Morioka, Japan (indoor hard)
8	Italy	3
Japan	1
Marbella, Spain (clay)
3	Great Britain	1
Spain	3
Brisbane, Australia (hard)
6	Australia	1
Germany	3
Astana, Kazakhstan (indoor hard)
Kazakhstan	4
5	Switzerland	1
Osijek, Croatia (indoor clay)
Canada	1
4	Croatia	3
Niš, Serbia (indoor clay)
United States	3
7	Serbia	1
Liège, Belgium (indoor hard)
Hungary	2
2	Belgium	3

Quarterfinals; 6–8 April
Genoa, Italy (clay)
1	France	3
8	Italy	1
Valencia, Spain (clay)
Spain	3
Germany	2
Varaždin, Croatia (indoor clay)
Kazakhstan	1
4	Croatia	3
Nashville, United States (indoor hard)
United States	4
2	Belgium	0

Semifinals; 14–16 September
Lille, France (indoor hard)
1	France	3
Spain	2
Zadar, Croatia (clay)
4	Croatia	3
United States	2

Final; 23–25 November
Lille, France (indoor clay)
1	France	1
4	Croatia	3

== First round ==
=== France vs. Netherlands ===
France
3
Halle olympique, Albertville, France
2–4 February
Hard (i)

Netherlands
1

			1	2	3	4	5
1	(France) (Netherlands)	Adrian Mannarino; Thiemo de Bakker	6^{4} 7^{7}	3; 6	3; 6
2	(France) (Netherlands)	Richard Gasquet; Robin Haase	6; 4	7^{7} 6^{3}	3; 6	7; 5
3	(France) (Netherlands)	Pierre-Hugues Herbert / Nicolas Mahut; Robin Haase / Jean-Julien Rojer	7^{8} 6^{6}	6; 3	6^{3} 7^{7}	7^{7} 6^{2}
4	(France) (Netherlands)	Adrian Mannarino; Robin Haase	4; 6	7^{7} 6^{5}	7; 5	6^{2} 7^{7}	7; 5
5	(France) (Netherlands)	Richard Gasquet; Thiemo de Bakker						not played

=== Japan vs. Italy ===
Japan
1
Morioka Takaya Arena, Morioka, Japan
2–4 February
Hard (i)

Italy
3

			1	2	3	4	5
1	(Japan) (Italy)	Taro Daniel; Fabio Fognini	4; 6	6; 3	6; 4	3; 6	2; 6
2	(Japan) (Italy)	Yūichi Sugita; Andreas Seppi	4; 6	6; 2	6; 4	4; 6	7^{7} 6^{1}
3	(Japan) (Italy)	Ben McLachlan / Yasutaka Uchiyama; Simone Bolelli / Fabio Fognini	5; 7	7^{7} 6^{4}	6^{3} 7^{7}	5; 7
4	(Japan) (Italy)	Yūichi Sugita; Fabio Fognini	6; 3	1; 6	6; 3	6^{6} 7^{8}	5; 7
5	(Japan) (Italy)	Taro Daniel; Andreas Seppi						not played

=== Spain vs. Great Britain ===
Spain
3
Club de Tenis Puente Romano, Marbella, Spain
2–4 February
Clay

Great Britain
1

			1	2	3	4	5
1	(Spain) (United Kingdom)	Albert Ramos Viñolas; Liam Broady	6; 3	6; 4	7^{8} 6^{6}
2	(Spain) (United Kingdom)	Roberto Bautista Agut; Cameron Norrie	6; 4	6; 3	3; 6	2; 6	2; 6
3	(Spain) (United Kingdom)	Pablo Carreño Busta / Feliciano López; Dominic Inglot / Jamie Murray	6; 4	6; 4	7^{7} 6^{4}
4	(Spain) (United Kingdom)	Albert Ramos Viñolas; Cameron Norrie	7^{7} 6^{4}	2; 6	7^{7} 6^{4}	6; 2
5	(Spain) (United Kingdom)	Roberto Bautista Agut; Liam Broady						not played

=== Australia vs. Germany ===
Australia
1
Pat Rafter Arena, Brisbane, Australia
2–4 February
Hard

Germany
3

			1	2	3	4	5
1	(Australia) (Germany)	Alex de Minaur; Alexander Zverev	5; 7	6; 4	6; 4	3; 6	6^{4} 7^{7}
2	(Australia) (Germany)	Nick Kyrgios; Jan-Lennard Struff	6; 4	6; 4	6; 4
3	(Australia) (Germany)	Matthew Ebden / John Peers; Tim Pütz / Jan-Lennard Struff	4; 6	7^{7} 6^{1}	2; 6	7^{7} 6^{4}	4; 6
4	(Australia) (Germany)	Nick Kyrgios; Alexander Zverev	2; 6	6^{3} 7^{7}	2; 6
5	(Australia) (Germany)	Alex de Minaur; Jan-Lennard Struff						not played

=== Kazakhstan vs. Switzerland ===
Kazakhstan
4
Daulet National Tennis Centre, Astana, Kazakhstan
2–4 February
Hard (i)

Switzerland
1

			1	2	3	4	5
1	(Kazakhstan) (Switzerland)	Dmitry Popko; Henri Laaksonen	6; 2	7^{9} 6^{7}	3; 6	7; 5
2	(Kazakhstan) (Switzerland)	Mikhail Kukushkin; Adrian Bodmer	3; 6	6; 3	6; 2	6; 3
3	(Kazakhstan) (Switzerland)	Timur Khabibulin / Aleksandr Nedovyesov; Marc-Andrea Hüsler / Luca Margaroli	6; 4	6; 4	3; 6	6^{5} 7^{7}	6; 3
4	(Kazakhstan) (Switzerland)	Roman Khassanov; Marc-Andrea Hüsler	3; 6	1; 6
5	(Kazakhstan) (Switzerland)	Dmitry Popko; Adrian Bodmer	7^{7} 6^{5}	1; 6	10; 6

=== Croatia vs. Canada ===
Croatia
3
Gradski vrt Hall, Osijek, Croatia
2–4 February
Clay (i)

Canada
1

			1	2	3	4	5
1	(Croatia) (Canada)	Borna Ćorić; Vasek Pospisil	3; 6	6; 2	6; 3	6; 2
2	(Croatia) (Canada)	Viktor Galović; Denis Shapovalov	4; 6	4; 6	2; 6
3	(Croatia) (Canada)	Marin Čilić / Ivan Dodig; Daniel Nestor / Vasek Pospisil	2; 6	3; 6	6; 4	7; 5	6; 2
4	(Croatia) (Canada)	Borna Ćorić; Denis Shapovalov	6; 4	6; 4	6; 4
5	(Croatia) (Canada)	Viktor Galović; Vasek Pospisil						not played

=== Serbia vs. United States ===
Serbia
1
Čair Sports Center, Niš, Serbia
2–4 February
Clay (i)

United States
3

			1	2	3	4	5
1	(Serbia) (United States)	Laslo Đere; Sam Querrey	7^{7} 6^{4}	2; 6	5; 7	4; 6
2	(Serbia) (United States)	Dušan Lajović; John Isner	4; 6	7^{9} 6^{7}	3; 6	6; 3	6^{4} 7^{7}
3	(Serbia) (United States)	Nikola Milojević / Miljan Zekić; Ryan Harrison / Steve Johnson	7^{7} 6^{3}	2; 6	5; 7	4; 6
4	(Serbia) (United States)	Peđa Krstin; Steve Johnson	6; 1	7; 5
5	(Serbia) (United States)	Laslo Đere; John Isner						not played

=== Belgium vs. Hungary ===
Belgium
3
Country Hall Liège, Liège, Belgium
2–4 February
Hard (i)

Hungary
2

			1	2	3	4	5
1	(Belgium) (Hungary)	Ruben Bemelmans; Márton Fucsovics	6; 4	4; 6	7^{7} 6^{5}	6; 3
2	(Belgium) (Hungary)	David Goffin; Attila Balázs	6; 4	6; 4	6; 0
3	(Belgium) (Hungary)	Ruben Bemelmans / Joris De Loore; Attila Balázs / Márton Fucsovics	3; 6	4; 6	7^{7} 6^{2}	6; 4	5; 7
4	(Belgium) (Hungary)	David Goffin; Márton Fucsovics	7; 5	6; 4	3; 6	6; 2
5	(Belgium) (Hungary)	Julien Cagnina; Zsombor Piros	3; 6	6^{3} 7^{7}

== Quarterfinals ==
=== Italy vs. France ===
Italy
1
Valletta Cambiaso ASD, Genoa, Italy
6–8 April
Clay

France
3

			1	2	3	4	5
1	(Italy) (France)	Andreas Seppi; Lucas Pouille	3; 6	2; 6	6; 4	6; 3	1; 6
2	(Italy) (France)	Fabio Fognini; Jérémy Chardy	6^{6} 7^{8}	6; 2	6; 2	6; 3
3	(Italy) (France)	Simone Bolelli / Fabio Fognini; Pierre-Hugues Herbert / Nicolas Mahut	4; 6	3; 6	1; 6
4	(Italy) (France)	Fabio Fognini; Lucas Pouille	6; 2	1; 6	6^{3} 7^{7}	3; 6
5	(Italy) (France)	Andreas Seppi; Jérémy Chardy						not played

=== Spain vs. Germany ===
Spain
3
Plaza de Toros de Valencia, Valencia, Spain
6–8 April
Clay

Germany
2

			1	2	3	4	5
1	(Spain) (Germany)	David Ferrer; Alexander Zverev	4; 6	2; 6	2; 6
2	(Spain) (Germany)	Rafael Nadal; Philipp Kohlschreiber	6; 2	6; 2	6; 3
3	(Spain) (Germany)	Feliciano López / Marc López; Tim Pütz / Jan-Lennard Struff	3; 6	4; 6	6; 3	7^{7} 6^{4}	5; 7
4	(Spain) (Germany)	Rafael Nadal; Alexander Zverev	6; 1	6; 4	6; 4
5	(Spain) (Germany)	David Ferrer; Philipp Kohlschreiber	7^{7} 6^{1}	3; 6	7^{7} 6^{4}	4; 6	7; 5

=== Croatia vs. Kazakhstan ===
Croatia
3
Varaždin Arena, Varaždin, Croatia
6–8 April
Clay (i)

Kazakhstan
1

			1	2	3	4	5
1	(Croatia) (Kazakhstan)	Marin Čilić; Dmitry Popko	6; 2	6; 1	6; 2
2	(Croatia) (Kazakhstan)	Borna Ćorić; Mikhail Kukushkin	6; 3	6^{5} 7^{7}	4; 6	2; 6
3	(Croatia) (Kazakhstan)	Ivan Dodig / Nikola Mektić; Timur Khabibulin / Aleksandr Nedovyesov	6^{2} 7^{7}	6; 4	6; 4	6; 2
4	(Croatia) (Kazakhstan)	Marin Čilić; Mikhail Kukushkin	6; 1	6; 1	6; 1
5	(Croatia) (Kazakhstan)	Borna Ćorić; Dmitry Popko						not played

=== United States vs. Belgium ===
United States
4
Curb Event Center, Nashville, United States
6–8 April
Hard (i)

Belgium
0

			1	2	3	4	5
1	(United States) (Belgium)	John Isner; Joris De Loore	6; 3	6^{4} 7^{7}	7^{10} 6^{8}	6; 4
2	(United States) (Belgium)	Sam Querrey; Ruben Bemelmans	6; 1	7^{7} 6^{5}	7; 5
3	(United States) (Belgium)	Ryan Harrison / Jack Sock; Sander Gillé / Joran Vliegen	5; 7	7^{7} 6^{1}	7^{7} 6^{3}	6; 4
4	(United States) (Belgium)	Ryan Harrison; Ruben Bemelmans	6; 3	6; 4
5	(United States) (Belgium)	Sam Querrey; Joris De Loore						not played

== Semifinals ==
=== France vs. Spain ===
France
3
Stade Pierre-Mauroy, Lille, France
14–16 September
Hard (i)

Spain
2

			1	2	3	4	5
1	(France) (Spain)	Benoît Paire; Pablo Carreño Busta	7; 5	6; 1	6; 0
2	(France) (Spain)	Lucas Pouille; Roberto Bautista Agut	3; 6	7^{7} 6^{5}	6; 4	2; 6	6; 4
3	(France) (Spain)	Julien Benneteau / Nicolas Mahut; Marcel Granollers / Feliciano López	6; 0	6; 4	7^{9} 6^{7}
4	(France) (Spain)	Richard Gasquet; Albert Ramos Viñolas	6; 1	4; 6	[12] [14]
5	(France) (Spain)	Nicolas Mahut; Marcel Granollers	7^{7} 6^{2}	3; 6	[11] [13]

=== Croatia vs. United States ===
Croatia
3
Višnjik, Zadar, Croatia
14–16 September
Clay

United States
2

			1	2	3	4	5
1	(Croatia) (United States)	Borna Ćorić; Steve Johnson	6; 4	7^{7} 6^{4}	6; 3
2	(Croatia) (United States)	Marin Čilić; Frances Tiafoe	6; 1	6; 3	7^{7} 6^{5}
3	(Croatia) (United States)	Ivan Dodig / Mate Pavić; Mike Bryan / Ryan Harrison	5; 7	6^{6} 7^{8}	6; 1	7^{7} 6^{5}	6^{5} 7^{7}
4	(Croatia) (United States)	Marin Čilić; Sam Querrey	7^{7} 6^{2}	6^{6} 7^{8}	3; 6	4; 6
5	(Croatia) (United States)	Borna Ćorić; Frances Tiafoe	6^{0} 7^{7}	6; 1	6^{11} 7^{13}	6; 1	6; 3

== Final ==
=== France vs. Croatia ===
France
1
Stade Pierre-Mauroy, Lille, France
23–25 November
Clay (i)

Croatia
3

			1	2	3	4	5
1	(France) (Croatia)	Jérémy Chardy; Borna Ćorić	2; 6	5; 7	4; 6
2	(France) (Croatia)	Jo-Wilfried Tsonga; Marin Čilić	3; 6	5; 7	4; 6
3	(France) (Croatia)	Nicolas Mahut / Pierre-Hugues Herbert; Ivan Dodig / Mate Pavić	6; 4	6; 4	3; 6	7^{7} 6^{3}
4	(France) (Croatia)	Lucas Pouille; Marin Čilić	6^{3} 7^{7}	3; 6	3; 6
5	(France) (Croatia)	Jo-Wilfried Tsonga; Borna Ćorić						not played
