= 2005 Davis Cup World Group =

- Date: 4 March – 4 December
- Edition: 25th

Champions
- Croatia
- Davis Cup

The World Group was the highest level of Davis Cup competition in 2005. The first-round losers went into the Davis Cup World Group play-offs, and the winners progress to the quarterfinals. The quarterfinalists were guaranteed a World Group spot for 2006.

On February 13, 2006, the International Tennis Federation (ITF) announced that Karol Beck had tested positive for the beta agonist clenbuterol during the semifinal for Slovakia against Argentina. As a consequence, the ITF suspended him from the game for two years.

== Participating teams ==
Participating teams
Argentina	Australia	Austria	Belarus
Czech Republic	Chile	Croatia	France
Netherlands	Romania	Russia	Slovakia
Spain	Sweden	Switzerland	United States

== Draw ==
First round 4–6 March
Bratislava, Slovakia (indoor hard)
1	Spain	1
Slovakia	4
Fribourg, Switzerland (indoor hard)
7	Switzerland	2
Netherlands	3
Sydney, Australia (grass)
4	Australia	5
Austria	0
Buenos Aires, Argentina (clay)
6	Argentina	5
Czech Republic	0
Moscow, Russia (indoor carpet)
Chile	1
5	Russia	4
Strasbourg, France (indoor clay)
Sweden	1
3	France	4
Brașov, Romania (indoor clay)
Romania	3
8	Belarus	2
Los Angeles, United States (hard)
Croatia	3
2	United States	2

Quarterfinals; 15–17 July
Bratislava, Slovakia (indoor hard)
Slovakia	4
Netherlands	1
Sydney, Australia (grass)
4	Australia	1
6	Argentina	4
Moscow, Russia (indoor clay)
5	Russia	3
3	France	2
Split, Croatia (indoor carpet)
Romania	1
Croatia	4

Semifinals; 23–25 September
Bratislava, Slovakia (indoor hard)
Slovakia	4
6	Argentina	1
Split, Croatia (indoor carpet)
5	Russia	2
Croatia	3

Final; 2–4 December
Bratislava, Slovakia (indoor hard)
Slovakia	2
Croatia	3

== First round ==
=== Slovakia vs. Spain ===
Slovakia
4
National Tennis Centre, Bratislava, Slovakia
4–6 March 2005
Hard (i)

Spain
1

			1	2	3	4	5
1	(Slovakia) (Spain)	Karol Beck; Feliciano López	6; 4	7; 5	6; 3
2	(Slovakia) (Spain)	Dominik Hrbatý; Fernando Verdasco	6; 3	6; 4	6^{7} 7^{9}	6; 3
3	(Slovakia) (Spain)	Karol Beck / Michal Mertiňák; Albert Costa / Rafael Nadal	7^{7} 6^{3}	6; 4	7^{10} 6^{8}
4	(Slovakia) (Spain)	Michal Mertiňák; Feliciano López	6; 0	6^{3} 7^{7}	6; 4
5	(Slovakia) (Spain)	Kamil Čapkovič; Fernando Verdasco	2; 6	2; 6

=== Switzerland vs. Netherlands ===
Switzerland
2
Expo Centre, Fribourg, Switzerland
4–6 March 2005
Hard (i)

Netherlands
3

			1	2	3	4	5
1	(Switzerland) (Netherlands)	Marco Chiudinelli; Sjeng Schalken	6^{4} 7^{7}	6; 4	3; 6	7; 5	2; 6
2	(Switzerland) (Netherlands)	Stanislas Wawrinka; Peter Wessels	6^{13} 7^{15}	7^{7} 6^{4}	6^{7} 7^{9}	4; 6
3	(Switzerland) (Netherlands)	Yves Allegro / George Bastl; Dennis van Scheppingen / Peter Wessels	5; 7	4; 6	7^{7} 6^{5}	7; 5	9; 7
4	(Switzerland) (Netherlands)	Stanislas Wawrinka; Sjeng Schalken	6; 1	2; 6	4; 6	6; 2	7; 9
5	(Switzerland) (Netherlands)	Marco Chiudinelli; Peter Wessels	4; 6					retired

=== Australia vs. Austria ===
Australia
5
Sydney International Tennis Centre, Sydney, Australia
4–6 March 2005
Grass

Austria
0

			1	2	3	4	5
1	(Australia) (Austria)	Lleyton Hewitt; Alexander Peya	6; 2	6; 3	6; 4
2	(Australia) (Austria)	Wayne Arthurs; Jürgen Melzer	7^{7} 6^{5}	6; 2	6; 4
3	(Australia) (Austria)	Wayne Arthurs / Todd Woodbridge; Julian Knowle / Jürgen Melzer	4; 6	6; 3	2; 6	6; 4	7; 5
4	(Australia) (Austria)	Todd Woodbridge; Marco Mirnegg	6; 3	4; 6	7; 5
5	(Australia) (Austria)	Chris Guccione; Alexander Peya	6; 3	6; 4

=== Argentina vs. Czech Republic ===
Argentina
5
Buenos Aires Lawn Tennis Club, Buenos Aires, Argentina
4–6 March 2005
Clay

Czech Republic
0

			1	2	3	4	5
1	(Argentina) (Czech Republic)	David Nalbandian; Jiří Novák	4; 6	6; 2	6; 3	6; 4
2	(Argentina) (Czech Republic)	Guillermo Coria; Tomáš Berdych	6; 3	3; 6	6; 0	6; 3
3	(Argentina) (Czech Republic)	Guillermo Cañas / David Nalbandian; Jan Hernych / Tomáš Zíb	6; 3	4; 6	6; 1	6; 2
4	(Argentina) (Czech Republic)	Guillermo Coria; Jan Hernych	6; 3	6; 0
5	(Argentina) (Czech Republic)	Agustín Calleri; Tomáš Zíb	6; 2	6; 4

=== Russia vs. Chile ===
Russia
4
Olympic Stadium, Moscow, Russia
4–6 March 2005
Carpet (i)

Chile
1

			1	2	3	4	5
1	(Russia) (Chile)	Mikhail Youzhny; Fernando González	6^{4} 7^{7}	7; 5	3; 6	6^{4} 7^{7}
2	(Russia) (Chile)	Marat Safin; Adrián García	6; 1	3; 6	6; 3	7^{7} 6^{4}
3	(Russia) (Chile)	Marat Safin / Mikhail Youzhny; Adrián García / Fernando González	6; 3	6; 4	6; 3
4	(Russia) (Chile)	Marat Safin; Fernando González	7^{7} 6^{4}	7^{7} 6^{5}	1; 6	6^{3} 7^{7}	6; 4
5	(Russia) (Chile)	Nikolay Davydenko; Paul Capdeville	6; 2	6; 1

=== France vs. Sweden ===
France
3
Hall Rhénus Sport, Strasbourg, France
4–6 March 2005
Clay (i)

Sweden
2

			1	2	3	4	5
1	(France) (Sweden)	Paul-Henri Mathieu; Joachim Johansson	6; 3	6; 4	6; 2
2	(France) (Sweden)	Sébastien Grosjean; Thomas Johansson	4; 6	4; 6	6^{1} 7^{7}
3	(France) (Sweden)	Arnaud Clément / Michaël Llodra; Simon Aspelin / Jonas Björkman	7^{7} 6^{5}	6; 4	6^{4} 7^{7}	6; 4
4	(France) (Sweden)	Sébastien Grosjean; Joachim Johansson	6; 3	1; 6	4; 6	1; 6
5	(France) (Sweden)	Paul-Henri Mathieu; Thomas Johansson	6; 1	6; 4	6^{4} 7^{7}	6; 4

=== Romania vs. Belarus ===
Romania
3
Dumitru Popescu Colibași Sports Hall, Brașov, Romania
4–6 March 2005
Clay (i)

Belarus
2

			1	2	3	4	5
1	(Romania) (Belarus)	Victor Hănescu; Max Mirnyi	6^{6} 7^{8}	4; 6	6; 3	4; 6
2	(Romania) (Belarus)	Andrei Pavel; Vladimir Voltchkov	6; 4	7^{7} 6^{2}	7^{7} 6^{2}
3	(Romania) (Belarus)	Andrei Pavel / Gabriel Trifu; Max Mirnyi / Vladimir Voltchkov	6^{3} 7^{7}	3; 6	4; 6
4	(Romania) (Belarus)	Andrei Pavel; Max Mirnyi	6; 1	7^{7} 6^{0}	4; 6	6; 3
5	(Romania) (Belarus)	Victor Hănescu; Vladimir Voltchkov	7^{7} 6^{2}	6; 4	7^{8} 6^{6}

=== United States vs. Croatia ===
United States
2
The Home Depot Center, Los Angeles, United States
4–6 March 2005
Hard

Croatia
3

			1	2	3	4	5
1	(United States) (Croatia)	Andre Agassi; Ivan Ljubičić	3; 6	6^{0} 7^{7}	3; 6
2	(United States) (Croatia)	Andy Roddick; Mario Ančić	4; 6	6; 2	6; 1	6; 4
3	(United States) (Croatia)	Bob Bryan / Mike Bryan; Mario Ančić / Ivan Ljubičić	6; 3	6^{8} 7^{10}	4; 6	4; 6
4	(United States) (Croatia)	Andy Roddick; Ivan Ljubičić	6; 4	3; 6	6^{11} 7^{13}	7^{9} 6^{7}	2; 6
5	(United States) (Croatia)	Bob Bryan; Roko Karanušić	6; 2	3; 6	6; 1

== Quarterfinals ==
=== Slovakia vs. Netherlands ===
Slovakia
4
Sibamac Arena National Tennis Centre, Bratislava, Slovakia
15–17 July 2005
Hard (i)

Netherlands
1

			1	2	3	4	5
1	(Slovakia) (Netherlands)	Dominik Hrbatý; Raemon Sluiter	6; 1	5; 7	6; 4	6; 3
2	(Slovakia) (Netherlands)	Karol Beck; Peter Wessels	7^{7} 6^{5}	5; 7	7^{7} 6^{3}	4; 6	2; 6
3	(Slovakia) (Netherlands)	Karol Beck / Michal Mertiňák; Paul Haarhuis / Melle van Gemerden	5; 7	6; 3	6; 4	7; 5
4	(Slovakia) (Netherlands)	Dominik Hrbatý; Peter Wessels	6; 3	6; 1	3; 0			retired
5	(Slovakia) (Netherlands)	Michal Mertiňák; Melle van Gemerden	4; 6	6; 3	6; 4

=== Australia vs. Argentina ===
Australia
1
Sydney International Tennis Centre, Sydney, Australia
15–17 July 2005
Grass

Argentina
4

			1	2	3	4	5
1	(Australia) (Argentina)	Lleyton Hewitt; Guillermo Coria	7^{7} 6^{5}	6; 1	1; 6	6; 2
2	(Australia) (Argentina)	Wayne Arthurs; David Nalbandian	3; 6	6^{8} 7^{10}	7; 5	2; 6
3	(Australia) (Argentina)	Wayne Arthurs / Lleyton Hewitt; David Nalbandian / Mariano Puerta	6^{6} 7^{8}	4; 6	3; 6
4	(Australia) (Argentina)	Lleyton Hewitt; David Nalbandian	2; 6	4; 6	4; 6
5	(Australia) (Argentina)	Peter Luczak; Guillermo Coria	3; 6	6^{11} 7^{13}

=== Russia vs. France ===
Russia
3
Olympic Stadium, Moscow, Russia
15–17 July 2005
Clay (i)

France
2

			1	2	3	4	5
1	(Russia) (France)	Igor Andreev; Richard Gasquet	4; 6	3; 6	6^{1} 7^{7}
2	(Russia) (France)	Nikolay Davydenko; Paul-Henri Mathieu	7; 5	6; 2	7; 5
3	(Russia) (France)	Igor Andreev / Mikhail Youzhny; Arnaud Clément / Michaël Llodra	5; 7	4; 6	7^{7} 6^{3}	2; 6
4	(Russia) (France)	Nikolay Davydenko; Richard Gasquet	6; 2	4; 6	6; 2	6; 1
5	(Russia) (France)	Igor Andreev; Paul-Henri Mathieu	6; 0	6; 2	6; 1

=== Croatia vs. Romania ===
Croatia
4
Dvorana SC Gripe, Split, Croatia
15–17 July 2005
Carpet (i)

Romania
1

			1	2	3	4	5
1	(Croatia) (Romania)	Mario Ančić; Andrei Pavel	6; 1	4; 6	6; 4	3; 6	4; 6
2	(Croatia) (Romania)	Ivan Ljubičić; Victor Hănescu	6; 3	6; 2	7^{7} 6^{3}
3	(Croatia) (Romania)	Mario Ančić / Ivan Ljubičić; Andrei Pavel / Gabriel Trifu	5; 7	6; 4	6^{9} 7^{11}	6; 4	6; 4
4	(Croatia) (Romania)	Ivan Ljubičić; Andrei Pavel	6; 3	6; 4	6; 3
5	(Croatia) (Romania)	Mario Ančić; Victor Hănescu	7^{7} 6^{3}	7^{10} 6^{8}

== Semifinals ==
=== Slovakia vs. Argentina ===
Slovakia
4
Sibamac Arena National Tennis Centre, Bratislava, Slovakia
23–25 September 2005
Hard (i)

Argentina
1

			1	2	3	4	5
1	(Slovakia) (Argentina)	Karol Beck; Guillermo Coria	7; 5	6; 4	6; 4
2	(Slovakia) (Argentina)	Dominik Hrbatý; David Nalbandian	6; 3	5; 7	5; 7	3; 6
3	(Slovakia) (Argentina)	Karol Beck / Michal Mertiňák; David Nalbandian / Mariano Puerta	7^{7} 6^{5}	7; 5	7^{7} 6^{5}
4	(Slovakia) (Argentina)	Dominik Hrbatý; Guillermo Coria	7^{7} 6^{2}	6; 2	6; 3
5	(Slovakia) (Argentina)	Karol Kučera; Mariano Puerta	4; 6	6; 3	2; 1			retired

=== Croatia vs. Russia ===
Croatia
3
Dvorana SC Gripe, Split, Croatia
23–25 September 2005
Hard (i)

Russia
2

			1	2	3	4	5
1	(Croatia) (Russia)	Mario Ančić; Nikolay Davydenko	5; 7	4; 6	7; 5	4; 6
2	(Croatia) (Russia)	Ivan Ljubičić; Mikhail Youzhny	3; 6	6; 3	6; 4	4; 6	6; 4
3	(Croatia) (Russia)	Mario Ančić / Ivan Ljubičić; Igor Andreev / Dmitry Tursunov	6; 2	4; 6	7^{7} 6^{5}	3; 6	6; 4
4	(Croatia) (Russia)	Ivan Ljubičić; Nikolay Davydenko	6; 3	7^{8} 6^{6}	6; 4
5	(Croatia) (Russia)	Ivo Karlović; Dmitry Tursunov	4; 6	4; 6

== Final ==
=== Slovakia vs. Croatia ===
Slovakia
2
Sibamac Arena, Bratislava, Slovakia
2–4 December 2005
Hard (i)

Croatia
3

			1	2	3	4	5
1	(Slovakia) (Croatia)	Karol Kučera; Ivan Ljubičić	3; 6	4; 6	3; 6
2	(Slovakia) (Croatia)	Dominik Hrbatý; Mario Ančić	7^{7} 6^{4}	6; 4	6^{4} 7^{7}	6; 4
3	(Slovakia) (Croatia)	Dominik Hrbatý / Michal Mertiňák; Mario Ančić / Ivan Ljubičić	6^{5} 7^{7}	3; 6	6^{5} 7^{7}
4	(Slovakia) (Croatia)	Dominik Hrbatý; Ivan Ljubičić	4; 6	6; 3	6; 4	3; 6	6; 4
5	(Slovakia) (Croatia)	Michal Mertiňák; Mario Ančić	6^{1} 7^{7}	3; 6	4; 6
