= 2009 Davis Cup =

2009 edition of the Davis Cup

Details
- Duration: 6 March – 6 December 2009
- Edition: 98th

Champion
- Winning nation: Spain

The 2009 Davis Cup was the 98th edition of the most important tournament between national teams in men's tennis. Sixteen teams participated in the World Group and more than one hundred other took part in different regional groups. Spain won their fourth Davis Cup trophy, defending the title they had won the previous year. It is the first year that the ITF awarded ATP rankings points to the players competing in the World Group and related play-offs. Yemen made its first appearance in the tournament.

== World Group ==
Participating Teams
Argentina	Austria	Chile	Croatia
Czech Republic	France	Germany	Israel
Netherlands	Romania	Russia	Serbia
Spain	Sweden	Switzerland	United States

=== Draw ===
First round 6–8 March
Buenos Aires, Argentina (clay)
1	Argentina	5
Netherlands	0
Ostrava, Czech Republic (indoor carpet)
8	France	2
Czech Republic	3
Birmingham, United States (indoor hard)
4	United States	4
Switzerland	1
Poreč, Croatia (indoor hard)
5	Croatia	5
Chile	0
Malmö, Sweden (indoor carpet)
Israel	3
6	Sweden	2
Sibiu, Romania (indoor carpet)
Romania	1
3	Russia	4
Garmisch-Partenkirchen, Germany (indoor hard)
Austria	2
7	Germany	3
Benidorm, Spain (clay)
Serbia	1
2	Spain	4

Quarterfinals; 10–12 July
Ostrava, Czech Republic (indoor hard)
1	Argentina	2
Czech Republic	3
Poreč, Croatia (indoor clay)
4	United States	2
5	Croatia	3
Tel Aviv, Israel (indoor hard)
Israel	4
3	Russia	1
Marbella, Spain (clay)
7	Germany	2
2	Spain	3

Semifinals; 18–20 September
Poreč, Croatia (indoor clay)
Czech Republic	4
5	Croatia	1
Murcia, Spain (clay)
Israel	1
2	Spain	4

Final; 4–6 December
Barcelona, Spain (indoor clay)
Czech Republic	0
2	Spain	5

=== Final ===
Spain
5
Palau Sant Jordi, Barcelona, Spain
4–6 December 2009
Clay (i)

Czech Republic
0

			1	2	3	4	5
1	(Spain) (Czech Republic)	Rafael Nadal; Tomáš Berdych	7; 5	6; 0	6; 2
2	(Spain) (Czech Republic)	David Ferrer; Radek Štěpánek	1; 6	2; 6	6; 4	6; 4	8; 6
3	(Spain) (Czech Republic)	Feliciano López / Fernando Verdasco; Tomáš Berdych / Radek Štěpánek	7^{9} 6^{7}	7; 5	6; 2
4	(Spain) (Czech Republic)	Rafael Nadal; Jan Hájek	6; 3	6; 4
5	(Spain) (Czech Republic)	David Ferrer; Lukáš Dlouhý	6; 4	6; 2

== World Group play-offs ==
- Date: 18–20 September

The eight losing teams in the World Group first round ties, and eight winners of the Group I second round ties compete in the World Group play-offs.

Seeded teams

- Austria
- Belgium
- Brazil
- France
- India
- Serbia
- Sweden
- Switzerland

Unseeded teams

- Chile
- Ecuador
- Netherlands
- Italy
- Romania
- South Africa
- Ukraine
- Uzbekistan

Home team	Score	Visiting team	Location	Venue	Door	Surface
Chile	3–2	Austria	Rancagua	Medialuna Monumental de Rancagua	Outdoor	Clay
Belgium	3–2	Ukraine	Charleroi	Spiroudome de Charleroi	Indoor	Clay
Brazil	2–3	Ecuador	Porto Alegre	Ginásio Gigantinho	Indoor	Clay
Netherlands	1–4	France	Maastricht	MECC Maastricht	Indoor	Clay
South Africa	1–4	India	Johannesburg	Ellis Park Indoor Arena	Indoor	Hard
Serbia	5–0	Uzbekistan	Belgrade	Belgrade Arena	Indoor	Hard
Sweden	4–1	Romania	Helsingborg	Idrottens Hus	Indoor	Hard
Italy	2–3	Switzerland	Genova	Valletta Cambiaso Club	Outdoor	Clay

- Chile, France, Serbia, Sweden and Switzerland will remain in the World Group in 2010.
- Belgium, Ecuador, and India are promoted to the World Group in 2010.
- Brazil, Italy, South Africa, Ukraine and Uzbekistan will remain in Zonal Group I in 2010.
- Austria, Netherlands and Romania are relegated to Zonal Group I in 2010.

== Americas Zone ==
=== Group I ===
Relegation Play-offs; Final
Lima, Peru (clay)
Uruguay	4
2	Peru	1

Relegation Play-offs; Semifinals
bye
Uruguay
Lima, Peru (clay)
Canada	3
2	Peru	2

First Round
1	Brazil
bye
Bogotá, Colombia (clay)
Uruguay	0
Colombia	5
Toronto, Canada (indoor hard)
Canada	2
Ecuador	3
bye
2	Peru

Second Round
Tunja, Colombia (clay)
1	Brazil	4
Colombia	1
Quito, Ecuador (clay)
Ecuador	4
2	Peru	1

- Peru relegated to Group II in 2010.
- Brazil and Ecuador advanced to World Group play-offs.

=== Group II ===
Play-offs
Jamaica	0
Netherlands Antilles	5
Guatemala	3
Bahamas	2

First Round
Mexico City, Mexico
1	Mexico	5
Jamaica	0
Barquisimeto, Venezuela
3	Venezuela	4
Netherlands Antilles	1
Santo Domingo, Dominican Republic
Guatemala	0
4	Dominican Republic	5
Lambare, Paraguay
Bahamas	1
2	Paraguay	4

Second Round
1	Mexico	2
3	Venezuela	3
4	Dominican Republic	3
2	Paraguay	2

Third Round
3	Venezuela	2
4	Dominican Republic	3

- Jamaica and Bahamas relegated to Group III in 2010.
- Dominican Republic promoted to Group I in 2010.

=== Group III ===
Pool A

		ESA	BOL	BAR	HAI
1	El Salvador (2–0)		3–0	2–1	—
2	Bolivia (1–1)	0–3		2–1	—
3	Barbados (0–2)	1–2	1–2		—
4	Haiti (withdrew)	—	—	—	

Pool B

		CUB	PUR	CRC	HON
1	Cuba (3–0)		3–0	3–0	3–0
2	Puerto Rico (2–1)	0–3		2–1	2–1
3	Costa Rica (1–2)	0–3	1–2		3–0
4	Honduras (0–3)	0–3	1–2	0–3	

Promotion Pool

		ESA	BOL	CUB	PUR
1	El Salvador (3–0)		3–0	3–0	3–0
2	Bolivia (2–1)	0–3		2–1	2–1
3	Cuba (2–1)	0–3	1–2		3–0
4	Puerto Rico (0–3)	0–3	1–2	0–3	

Relegation Pool

		CRC	BAR	HON	HAI
1	Costa Rica (2–0)		2–1	3–0	—
2	Barbados (1–1)	1–2		3–0	—
3	Honduras (0–2)	0–3	0–3		—
4	Haiti (withdrew)	—	—	—	

- El Salvador and Bolivia promoted to Group II in 2010.
- Barbados and Honduras relegated to Group IV in 2010.

=== Group IV ===
		ARU	BER	ISV	TRI	PAN
1	Aruba (4–0)		2–1	2–1	2–1	2–1
2	Bermuda (3–1)	1–2		2–1	2–1	3–0
3	U.S. Virgin Islands (2–2)	1–2	1–2		2–1	2–1
4	Trinidad and Tobago (1–3)	1–2	1–2	1–2		2–1
5	Panama (0–4)	1–2	0–3	1–2	1–2	

- Aruba & Bermuda advanced to Group III in 2010.

== Asia/Oceania Zone ==
=== Group I ===
Third Round Play-offs
Jiaxing, China (indoor hard)
Thailand	1
China	4

Second Round Play-offs
Nonthaburi, Thailand (hard)
Thailand	0
Kazakhstan	5
Chuncheon City, South Korea (hard)
China	2
2	South Korea	3

First Round Play-offs
bye
Thailand
bye
Kazakhstan
China
bye
bye
2	South Korea

First Round
1	Australia
bye
Thailand
bye
4	India
bye
Taipei County, Chinese Taipei (indoor carpet)
Kazakhstan	1
Chinese Taipei	4
bye
China
bye
3	Japan
bye
Uzbekistan
bye
2	South Korea

Second Round
Nonthaburi, Thailand (hard)
1	Australia	3
Thailand	2
Kaohsiung, Chinese Taipei (hard)
4	India	3
Chinese Taipei	2
Osaka, Japan (indoor carpet)
China	0
3	Japan	5
Namangan, Uzbekistan (indoor clay)
Uzbekistan	4
2	South Korea	1

Third Round
Chennai, India (hard)
1	Australia
4	India	w/o
Namangan, Uzbekistan (indoor clay)
3	Japan	2
Uzbekistan	3

- Thailand relegated to Group II in 2010.
- India and Uzbekistan advanced to World Group play-offs.
  - India automatically advanced to the play-offs by walkover when Australia refused to play at the scheduled site of Chennai due to security concerns.

=== Group II ===
Play-offs
Hong Kong
Hong Kong	5
Oman	0
Kuala Lumpur, Malaysia
3	Kuwait	1
Malaysia	4

First Round
Hong Kong Island, Hong Kong
1	Philippines	4
Hong Kong	1
Muscat, Oman
4	Pakistan	4
Oman	1
Surakarta, Indonesia
Indonesia	3
3	Kuwait	2
North Shore City, New Zealand
Malaysia	0
2	New Zealand	5

Second Round
Manila, Philippines
1	Philippines	3
4	Pakistan	2
Hamilton, New Zealand
Indonesia	0
2	New Zealand	5

Third Round
Manila, Philippines
1	Philippines	4
2	New Zealand	1

- Oman and Kuwait relegated to Group III in 2010.
- Philippines promoted to Group I in 2010.

=== Group III ===
	Pool A	PAC	LIB	TJK	SIN
1	Pacific Oceania (3–0)		2–1	3–0	3–0
2	Lebanon (2–1)	1–2		2–1	2–1
3	Tajikistan (1–2)	0–3	1–2		3–0
4	Singapore (0–3)	0–3	1–2	0–3	

	Pool B	SRI	SYR	KSA	IRI
1	Sri Lanka (3–0)		3–0	3–0	2–1
2	Syria (2–1)	0–3		3–0	3–0
3	Saudi Arabia (1–2)	0–3	0–3		2–1
4	Iran (0–3)	1–2	0–3	1–2	

Top two teams advance to 1st–4th Play-off, bottom two teams advance to 5th–8th Play-off. Scores in italics carried over from pools.

	Promotion Pool	PAC	SRI	SYR	LIB
1	Pacific Oceania (3–0)		3–0	2–1	2–1
2	Sri Lanka (2–1)	0–3		3–0	3–0
3	Syria (1–2)	1–2	0–3		3–0
4	Lebanon (0–3)	1–2	0–3	0–3	

	Relegation Pool	KSA	IRI	TJK	SIN
1	Saudi Arabia (3–0)		2–1	3–0	3–0
2	Iran (2–1)	1–2		2–1	3–0
3	Tajikistan (1–2)	0–3	1–2		3–0
4	Singapore (0–3)	0–3	0–3	0–3	

- Pacific Oceania and Sri Lanka promoted to Group II in 2010.
- Tajikistan and Singapore relegated to Group IV in 2010.

=== Group IV ===
	Pool A	VIE	UAE	BHR	YEM	IRQ
1	Vietnam (3–0)		2–1	3–0	3–0	
2	United Arab Emirates (2–1)	1–2		2–1	3–0	
3	Bahrain (1–2)	0–3	1–2		2–1	
4	Yemen (0–3)	0–3	0–3	1–2		
5	Iraq ()					

	Pool B	BAN	JOR	QAT	MYA	TKM
1	Bangladesh (4–0)		2–1	3–0	2–1	3–0
2	Jordan (3–1)	1–2		3–0	2–1	3–0
3	Qatar (2–2)	0–3	0–3		2–1	3–0
4	Myanmar (1–3)	1–2	1–2	1–2		3–0
5	Turkmenistan (0–4)	0–3	0–3	0–3	0–3	

- Bangladesh and Vietnam are promoted to Asia/Oceania Group III in 2010.

== Europe/Africa Zone ==
=== Group I ===
Second Round Play-offs
Bratislava, Slovakia (indoor hard)
Slovakia	5
Macedonia	0
Liverpool, Great Britain (indoor hard)
Great Britain	2
Poland	3

First Round Play-offs
Slovakia
bye
Minsk, Belarus (hard)
Belarus	4
Macedonia	1
bye
Great Britain
Poland
bye

First Round
Slovakia
bye
Italy
bye
Belarus
bye
Johannesburg, South Africa (hard)
South Africa	5
Macedonia	0
bye
Ukraine
bye
Great Britain
bye
Poland
bye
Belgium

Second Round
Cagliari, Italy (clay)
Slovakia	1
Italy	4
Johannesburg, South Africa (hard)
Belarus	0
South Africa	5
Renfrewshire, Great Britain (indoor hard)
Ukraine	4
Great Britain	1
Liège, Belgium (clay)
Poland	1
Belgium	4

- Macedonia and Great Britain relegated to Group II in 2010.
- Italy, South Africa,Ukraine, and Belgium advance to World Group Play-off.

=== Group II ===
Relegation Play-offs
Cairo, Egypt
Georgia	0
Egypt	5
Gödöllő, Hungary
Moldova	2
Hungary	3
Lyngby, Denmark
Denmark	3
Montenegro	2
Oran, Algeria
Algeria	0
Portugal	5

First Round
Vilnius, Lithuania
Georgia	2
Lithuania	3
Otočec, Slovenia
Slovenia	5
Egypt	0
Jūrmala, Latvia
Latvia	5
Moldova	0
Győr, Hungary
Hungary	2
Bulgaria	3
Kolding, Denmark
Denmark	2
Finland	3
Roquebrune-Cap-Martin, Monaco
Montenegro	0
Monaco	5
Algiers, Algeria
Ireland	4
Algeria	1
Nicosia, Cyprus
Cyprus	3
Portugal	2

Second Round
Otočec, Slovenia
Lithuania	0
Slovenia	5
Plovdiv, Bulgaria
Latvia	4
Bulgaria	1
Naantali, Finland
Finland	3
Monaco	2
Nicosia, Cyprus
Ireland	2
Cyprus	3

Third Round
Jūrmala, Latvia
Slovenia	2
Latvia	3
Salo, Finland
Finland	3
Cyprus	2

- Georgia, Moldova, Montenegro, and Algeria relegated to Group III in 2010.
- Latvia and Finland promoted to Group I in 2010

=== Group III ===
==== Section A ====
Group A

		EST	LUX	ICE	BTW
1	Estonia (3–0)		3–0	3–0	3–0
2	Luxembourg (2–1)	0–3		3–0	3–0
3	Iceland (1–2)	0–3	0–3		2–1
4	Botswana (0–3)	0–3	0–3	1–2	

Group B

		TUR	GRE	MAD	RWA
1	Turkey (3–0)		2–1	2–1	3–0
2	Greece (2–1)	1–2		3–0	3–0
3	Madagascar (0–2)	1–2	0–3		NP
4	Rwanda (0–2)	0–3	0–3	NP	

Promotion Play-Off Group

		EST	TUR	LUX	GRE
1	Estonia (3–0)		2–1	3–0	3–0
2	Turkey (2–1)	1–2		2–0	2–1
3	Luxembourg (1–2)	0–3	0–2		2–1
4	Greece (0–3)	0–3	1–2	1–2	

Relegation Play-Off Group

		MAD	ISL	RWA	BWA
1	Madagascar (2–0)		2–1	NP	3–0
2	Iceland (2–1)	1–2		2–1	2–1
3	Rwanda (1–1)	NP	1–2		2–1
4	Botswana (0–3)	0–3	1–2	1–2	

- Estonia and Turkey are promoted to Europe/Africa Group II in 2010.
- Rwanda and Botswana are relegated to Europe/Africa Group IV in 2010.

==== Section B ====
Group A

		MAR	TUN	NGR	SMR
1	Morocco (3–0)		2–1	3–0	3–0
2	Tunisia (2–1)	1–2		3–0	3–0
3	Nigeria (1–2)	0–3	0–3		3–0
4	San Marino (0–3)	0–3	0–3	0–3	

Group B

		NOR	BIH	AND	NAM
1	Norway (3–0)		2–1	3–0	3–0
2	Bosnia and Herzegovina (2–1)	1–2		3–0	3–0
3	Andorra (1–2)	0–3	0–3		2–1
4	Namibia (0–3)	0–3	0–3	1–2	

Promotion Play-Off Group

		NOR	BIH	MAR	TUN
1	Norway (2–1)		1–2	2–1	2–1
2	Bosnia and Herzegovina (2–1)	2–1		1–2	2–1
3	Morocco (2–1)	1–2	2–1		2–1
4	Tunisia (0–3)	1–2	1–2	1–2	

Relegation Play-Off Group

		AND	NGR	NAM	SMR
1	Andorra (3–0)		3–0	2–1	2–1
2	Nigeria (2–1)	0–3		2–1	3–0
3	Namibia (1–2)	1–2	1–2		2–1
4	San Marino (0–3)	1–2	0–3	1–2	

- Norway and Bosnia and Herzegovina are promoted to Europe/Africa Group II in 2010.
- Namibia and San Marino are relegated to Europe/Africa Group IV in 2010.

=== Group IV ===
		GHA	ZIM	CIV	ARM	CMR
1	Ghana (4–0)		3–0	3–0	3–0	3–0
2	Zimbabwe (3–1)	0–3		2–1	2–1	3–0
3	Ivory Coast (2–2)	0–3	1–2		2–1	2–1
4	Armenia (1–3)	0–3	1–2	1–2		3–0
5	Cameroon (0–4)	0–3	0–3	1–2	0–3	

- Ghana, Zimbabwe, Ivory Coast and Armenia are promoted to Europe/Africa Group III in 2010.

== Point Distribution ==
Davis Cup
Rubber category		Match win	Match loss	Team bonus	Performance bonus	Total achievable
Singles	Play-offs	5 / 10^{1}				15
Singles	First round	40	10^{2}			80
Singles	Quarterfinals	65				130
Singles	Semifinals	70				140
Singles	Final	75		75^{3}	125^{4}	150 / 225^{3} / 275^{4}
Singles	Cumulative total	500		500 to 535^{3}	625^{4}	625^{4}
Doubles	Play-offs	10				10
Doubles	First round	50	10^{2}			50
Doubles	Quarterfinals	80				80
Doubles	Semifinals	90				90
Doubles	Final	95		35^{5}		95 / 130^{5}
Doubles	Cumulative total	315		350^{5}		350^{5}

The Davis Cup World Group and World Group Play-Off matches awarded ATP Ranking points from 2009 to 2015.

Glossary

Only live matches earn points; dead rubbers earn no points. If a player does not compete in the singles of one or more rounds he will receive points from the previous round when playing singles at the next tie. This last rule also applies for playing in doubles matches.

^{1} A player who wins a singles rubber in the first day of the tie is awarded 5 points, whereas a singles rubber win in tie's last day grants 10 points for a total of 15 available points.

^{2} For the first round only, any player who competes in a live rubber, without a win, receives 10 ranking points for participation.

^{3} Team bonus awarded to a singles player who wins 7 live matches in a calendar year and his team wins the competition.

^{4} Performance bonus awarded to a singles player who wins 8 live matches in a calendar year. In this case, no Team bonus is awarded.

^{5} Team bonus awarded to an unchanged doubles team who wins 4 matches in a calendar year and his team wins the competition.
