= Slovakia Davis Cup team =

Davis Cup team representing Slovakia

Slovakia
- Captain: Tibor Tóth
- Nations Ranking: 24 (21 September 2026)
- Highest ranking: 3 (6 December 2005)
- Lowest ranking: 36 (16 September 2013)
- Colors: Blue, red & white
- First year: 1994
- Years played: 32
- Ties played (W–L): 74 (42–32)
- Years in World Group: 12 (8–11)
- Runners-up: 1 (2005)
- Most total wins: Karol Kučera (33–18); Dominik Hrbatý (33–25)
- Most singles wins: Dominik Hrbatý (28–14)
- Most doubles wins: Filip Polášek (14–4)
- Best doubles team: Filip Polášek & Igor Zelenay (6–0)
- Most ties played: Dominik Hrbatý (26)
- Most years played: Dominik Hrbatý (14)

The Slovakia men's national tennis team represents Slovakia in Davis Cup tennis competition and are governed by the Slovak Tennis Association.

Slovakia finished as runners-up in 2005, losing 3–2 to Croatia in the final. They currently compete in the Europe/Africa Zone of Group I. They last competed in the World Group in 2006.

== History ==
Slovakia competed in its first Davis Cup in 1994. Slovak players had previously played for Czechoslovakia.

Following the 2005 Davis Cup World Group competition, the International Tennis Federation (ITF) announced that Karol Beck, one of the players for Slovakia, had tested positive for the beta agonist clenbuterol during the semifinal against Argentina, which Slovakia won 4–1.

== Results and fixtures ==
The following are lists of match results and scheduled matches for the previous and upcoming season.

Win Loss Fixture

=== 2025 ===
Qualifiers
First round

Croatia
3
Gradski vrt Hall, Osijek, Croatia
31 January–1 February 2025
Hard (indoors)

Slovakia
1

			1	2	3
1	(Croatia) (Slovakia)	Duje Ajduković; Lukáš Klein	7^{7} 6^{4}	6; 3
2	(Croatia) (Slovakia)	Dino Prižmić; Jozef Kovalík	6; 2	6; 2
3	(Croatia) (Slovakia)	Nikola Mektić / Mate Pavić; Miloš Karol / Lukáš Klein	7^{7} 6^{4}	7; 5
4	(Croatia) (Slovakia)	Matej Dodig; Norbert Gombos	4; 6	4; 6
5	(Croatia) (Slovakia)	Dino Prižmić; Lukáš Klein				not played

World Group I

Slovakia
3
Peugeot Arena, Bratislava, Slovakia
12–13 September 2025
Hard (indoors)

Colombia
1

			1	2	3
1	(Slovakia) (Colombia)	Alex Molčan; Nicolás Mejía	6; 4	7^{7} 6^{4}
2	(Slovakia) (Colombia)	Lukáš Klein; Adrià Soriano Barrera	6; 3	6^{5} 7^{7}	6^{5} 7^{7}
3	(Slovakia) (Colombia)	Miloš Karol / Lukáš Klein; Nicolás Barrientos / Cristian Rodríguez	6; 4	6; 3
4	(Slovakia) (Colombia)	Norbert Gombos; Nicolás Mejía	6; 4	6; 4
5	(Slovakia) (Colombia)	Alex Molčan; Adrià Soriano Barrera				not played

=== 2026 ===
Qualifiers
First round

France
3
Le Chaudron, Le Portel, France
7–8 February 2026
Hard (indoors)

Slovakia
1

			1	2	3
1	(France) (Slovakia)	Alexandre Müller; Alex Molčan	4; 6	4; 6
2	(France) (Slovakia)	Arthur Rinderknech; Norbert Gombos	7^{7} 6^{1}	7^{8} 6^{6}
3	(France) (Slovakia)	Benjamin Bonzi / Pierre-Hugues Herbert; Miloš Karol / Lukáš Klein	6; 2	6; 3
4	(France) (Slovakia)	Arthur Rinderknech; Alex Molčan	7; 5	7^{8} 6^{6}
5	(France) (Slovakia)	Alexandre Müller; Norbert Gombos				not played

World Group I

Slovakia
3
NTC Košice, Košice, Slovakia
19–20 September 2026
Clay

Greece
2

			1	2	3
1	(Slovakia) (Greece)	Alex Molčan; Stefanos Sakellaridis	6; 1	6; 1
2	(Slovakia) (Greece)	Norbert Gombos; Stefanos Tsitsipas	6^{3} 7^{7}	4; 6
3	(Slovakia) (Greece)	Miloš Karol / Lukáš Pokorný; Petros Tsitsipas / Stefanos Tsitsipas	7^{7} 6^{4}	6; 3
4	(Slovakia) (Greece)	Alex Molčan; Stefanos Tsitsipas	6; 2	3; 6	4; 6
5	(Slovakia) (Greece)	Norbert Gombos; Stefanos Sakellaridis	6; 4	7^{7} 6^{4}

== Players ==
=== Current team (2024) ===
- Alex Molčan (singles)
- Lukáš Klein (singles)
- Lukáš Pokorný (singles)
- Jozef Kovalík (singles)
- Igor Zelenay (doubles)

== Historical results ==
=== 1990s ===
Year	Competition	Date	Location	Opponent	Surface	Score	Result
1994	Group III Euro-African Zone, Group A	18 May	Bratislava (SVK)	Malta	Clay	3–0	Won
1994	Group III Euro-African Zone, Group A	19 May	Bratislava (SVK)	Sudan	Clay	3–0	Won
1994	Group III Euro-African Zone, Group A	20 May	Bratislava (SVK)	Turkey	Clay	3–0	Won
1994	Group III Euro-African Zone, Semi-final	21 May	Bratislava (SVK)	Tunisia	Clay	3–0	Won
1994	Group III Euro-African Zone, Final	22 May	Bratislava (SVK)	Lithuania	Clay	3–0	Won
1995	Group II Euro-African Zone, 1st Round	28–30 April	Bratislava (SVK)	Great Britain	Clay	5–0	Won
1995	Group II Euro-African Zone, Quarter-final	14–16 July	Cairo (EGY)	Egypt	Clay	2–3	Lost
1996	Group II Euro-African Zone, 1st Round	3–5 May	Budva (YUG)	FR Yugoslavia	Clay	4–1	Won
1996	Group II Euro-African Zone, Quarter-final	12–14 July	Trnava (SVK)	Portugal	Carpet	5–0	Won
1996	Group II Euro-African Zone, Semi-final	20–22 September	Trnava (SVK)	Poland	Carpet	4–1	Won
1997	Group I Euro-African Zone, Quarter-Final	4–6 April	Bratislava (SVK)	Israel	Clay	3–1	Won
1997	World Group, Play-Off	19–21 September	Montreal (CAN)	Canada	Carpet	4–1	Won
1998	World Group, 1st Round	3–4 April	Bratislava (SVK)	Sweden	Clay	2–3	Lost
1998	World Group, Play Off	25–28 September	Buenos Aires (ARG)	Argentina	Clay	3–2	Won
1999	World Group, 1st Round	2–4 April	Trollhättan (SWE)	Sweden	Carpet	3–2	Won
1999	World Group, Quarter-final	16–18 July	Moscow (RUS)	Russia	Clay	2–3	Lost

=== 2000s ===
Year	Competition	Date	Location	Opponent	Surface	Score	Result
2000	World Group, 1st Round	4–6 February	Bratislava (SVK)	Austria	Hard	3–2	Won
2000	World Group, Quarter-final	7–9 April	Rio de Janeiro (BRA)	Brazil	Clay	2–3	Lost
2001	World Group, 1st Round	9–11 February	Bratislava (SVK)	Russia	Hard	2–3	Lost
2001	World Group, Play Off	21–23 September	Prešov (SVK)	Chile	Carpet	3–2	Won
2002	World Group, 1st Round	8–10 February	Oklahoma City (United States)	United States	Hard	0–5	Lost
2002	World Group, Play Off	20–22 September	Prešov (SVK)	Romania	Carpet	1–4	Lost
2003	Group I Euro-African Zone, Quarter-final	4–5 April	Esch-sur-Alzette (LUX)	Luxembourg	Hard	3–2	Won
2003	World Group, Play Off	19–21 September	Bratislava (SVK)	United States	Clay	2–3	Lost
2004	Group I Euro-African Zone, Quarter-final	9–11 April	Johannesburg (RSA)	South Africa	Grass	3–2	Won
2004	World Group, Play Off	24–26 September	Bratislava (SVK)	Germany	Hard	3–2	Won
2005	World group, 1st Round	4–6 March	Bratislava (SVK)	Spain	Hard	4–1	Won
2005	World group, Quarter-final	15–17 July	Bratislava (SVK)	Netherlands	Hard	4–1	Won
2005	World group, Semi-final	23–25 September	Bratislava (SVK)	Argentina	Hard	4–1	Won
2005	World group, Final	2–4 December	Bratislava (SVK)	Croatia	Hard	2–3	Runner-up
2006	World Group, 1st Round	10–12 February	Rancagua (CHI)	Chile	Clay	1–4	Lost
2006	World Group, Play Off	22–24 September	Bratislava (SVK)	Belgium	Hard	2–3	Lost
2007	Group I Euro-African Zone, Quarter-final	6–8 April	Skopje (MKD)	Macedonia	Clay	5–0	Won
2007	World Group, Play Off	21–23 September	Bratislava (SVK)	South Korea	Hard	2–3	Lost
2008	Group I Euro-African Zone, Quarter-final	11–13 April	Bratislava (SVK)	Georgia	Clay	4–1	Won
2008	World Group, Play Off	19–21 September	Bratislava (SVK)	Serbia	Hard	1–4	Lost
2009	Group I Euro-African Zone, Quarter-final	6–8 March	Cagliari (ITA)	Italy	Clay	1–4	Lost
2009	Group I Euro-African Zone, Relegation Play Off	18–20 September	Bratislava (SVK)	Macedonia	Hard	5–0	Won

=== 2010s ===
Year	Competition	Date	Location	Opponent	Surface	Score	Result
2010	Group I Euro-African Zone, Quarter-final	5–7 March	Bad Gleichenberg (AUT)	Austria	Hard (i)	2–3	Lost
2010	Group I Euro-African Zone, Relegation Play Off	17–19 September	Minsk (BLR)	Belarus	Hard	4–1	Won
2011	Group I Euro-African Zone, Quarter-final	4–6 March	Cruz Quebrada (POR)	Portugal	Clay	1–4	Lost
2011	Group I Euro-African Zone, Relegation Play Off	16–18 September	Bratislava (SVK)	Ukraine	Hard	4–1	Won
2012	Group I Euro-African Zone, 1st Round	10–12 February	Glasgow (GBR)	Great Britain	Hard (i)	2–3	Lost
2012	Group I Euro-African Zone, Relegation Play Off	14–16 September	Bratislava (SVK)	Portugal	Hard (i)	3–1	Won
2013	Group I Euro-African Zone, 1st Round	1–3 February	Kremenchuk (UKR)	Ukraine	Hard (i)	2–3	Lost
2013	Group I Euro-African Zone, Relegation Play Off	13–15 September	Bratislava (SVK)	Sweden	Hard (i)	3–2	Won
2014	Group I Euro-African Zone, 1st Round	31 Jan – 2 Feb	Bratislava (SVK)	Latvia	Hard (i)	5–0	Won
2014	Group I Euro-African Zone, 2nd Round	4–6 April	Bratislava (SVK)	Austria	Hard (i)	4–1	Won
2014	World Group, Play Off	12–14 September	Chicago (USA)	United States	Hard (i)	0–5	Lost
2015	Group I Euro-African Zone, 1st Round	6–8 March	Bratislava (SVK)	Slovenia	Hard (i)	5–0	Won
2015	Group I Euro-African Zone, 2nd Round	17–19 July	Constanța (ROU)	Romania	Clay	5–0	Won
2015	World Group, Play Off	18–20 September	Gdynia (POL)	Poland	Hard (i)	2–3	Lost
2016	Group I Euro-African Zone, Quarter-final	15–17 July	Budapest (HUN)	Hungary	Clay	3–0	Won
2016	World Group, Play Off	16–18 September	Sydney (AUS)	Australia	Grass	0–3	Lost
2017	Group I Euro-African Zone, Quarter-final	3–5 February	Bratislava (SVK)	Hungary	Hard (i)	1–3	Lost
2017	Group I Euro-African Zone, Relegation Play-Off	15–17 September	Bratislava (SVK)	Poland	Clay	4–1	Won
2018	Group I Euro-African Zone, Quarter-final	2–4 February	Bratislava (SVK)	Bosnia and Herzegovina	Clay (i)	2–3	Lost
2018	Group I Euro-African Zone, Relegation Play-Off	26–27 September	Bratislava (SVK)	Belarus	Clay (i)	3–1	Won
2019	Finals Qualifying Round	1–2 February	Bratislava (SVK)	Canada	Clay (i)	2–3	Lost
2019	Group I Euro-African Zone, 1st Round	13–14 September	Bratislava, (SVK)	Switzerland	Clay	3–1	Won

=== 2020s ===
Year	Competition	Date	Location	Opponent	Surface	Score	Result
2020–21	Finals Qualifying Round	6–7 March 2020	Bratislava (SVK)	Czech Republic	Clay (i)	1–3	Lost
2020–21	World Group I, 1st Round	17–18 Sep 2021	Bratislava (SVK)	Chile	Hard (i)	3–1	Won
2022	Finals Qualifying Round	4–5 March	Bratislava (SVK)	Italy	Hard (i)	2–3	Lost
2022	World Group I, 1st Round	16–18 September	Bratislava (SVK)	Romania	Clay (i)	3–1	Won
2023	Finals Qualifying Round	4–5 February	Groningen (NED)	Netherlands	Hard (i)	0–4	Lost
2023	World Group I, 1st Round	16–17 September	Athens (GRE)	Greece	Hard	3–1	Won
2024	Finals Qualifying Round	2–4 February	Kraljevo (SRB)	Serbia	Clay (i)	4–0	Won
2024	Finals, Group Stage (Group C)	10 September	Zhuhai (CHN)	Germany	Hard (i)	0–3	Lost
2024	Finals, Group Stage (Group C)	13 September	Zhuhai (CHN)	United States	Hard (i)	0–3	Lost
2024	Finals, Group Stage (Group C)	15 September	Zhuhai (CHN)	Chile	Hard (i)	1–2	Lost
2025	Finals Qualifiers, 1st Round	30 Jan – 2 Feb	Osijek (CRO)	Croatia	Hard (i)	1–3	Lost
2025	World Group I, 1st Round	12–14 September	Bratislava (SVK)	Colombia	Hard (i)	3–1	Won
2026	Finals Qualifiers, 1st Round	5–8 February	Le Portel (FRA)	France	Hard (i)	1–3	Lost
2026	World Group I, 1st Round	18–20 September	Košice (SVK)	Greece	Clay	3–2	Won

== See also ==
- Davis Cup
- Slovakia Billie Jean King Cup team
- Slovakia at the Hopman Cup
- Czech Republic Davis Cup team
