= 2015 Davis Cup World Group =

- Date: 6 March – 29 November
- Edition: 35th

Champions
- Great Britain
- Davis Cup

The World Group was the highest level of Davis Cup competition in 2015. The first-round losers went into the Davis Cup World Group play-offs, and the winners progressed to the quarterfinals and World Group spot for 2016.

== Participating teams ==
Participating teams
Argentina	Australia	Belgium	Brazil
Canada	Croatia	Czech Republic	France
Germany	Great Britain	Italy	Japan
Kazakhstan	Serbia	Switzerland	United States

=== Seeds ===
1. France (quarterfinals)
2. Switzerland (first round)
3. Czech Republic (first round)
4. Serbia (quarterfinals)
5. Argentina (semifinals)
6. Italy (first round)
7. United States (first round)
8. Canada (quarterfinals)

=== Draw ===
First round 6–8 March
Frankfurt, Germany (indoor hard)
1	France	3
Germany	2
Glasgow, Great Britain (indoor hard)
7	United States	2
Great Britain	3
Ostrava, Czech Republic (indoor hard)
3	Czech Republic	2
Australia	3
Astana, Kazakhstan (indoor hard)
6	Italy	2
Kazakhstan	3
Buenos Aires, Argentina (clay)
Brazil	2
5	Argentina	3
Kraljevo, Serbia (indoor hard)
Croatia	0
4	Serbia	5
Vancouver, Canada (indoor hard)
Japan	2
8	Canada	3
Liège, Belgium (indoor hard)
Belgium	3
2	Switzerland	2

Quarterfinals; 17–19 July
London, Great Britain (grass)
1	France	1
Great Britain	3
Darwin, Australia (grass)
Australia	3
Kazakhstan	2
Buenos Aires, Argentina (indoor clay)
5	Argentina	4
4	Serbia	1
Middelkerke, Belgium (clay)
8	Canada	0
Belgium	5

Semifinals; 18–20 September
Glasgow, Great Britain (indoor hard)
Great Britain	3
Australia	2
Brussels, Belgium (indoor hard)
5	Argentina	2
Belgium	3

Final; 27–29 November
Ghent, Belgium (indoor clay)
Great Britain	3
Belgium	1

== First round ==
=== Germany vs. France ===
Germany
2
Fraport Arena, Frankfurt, Germany
6–8 March 2015
Hard (i)

France
3

			1	2	3	4	5
1	(Germany) (France)	Jan-Lennard Struff; Gilles Simon	6^{4} 7^{7}	6; 2	7^{7} 6^{1}	2; 6	8; 10
2	(Germany) (France)	Philipp Kohlschreiber; Gaël Monfils	4; 6	5; 7	6^{4} 7^{7}
3	(Germany) (France)	Benjamin Becker / Andre Begemann; Julien Benneteau / Nicolas Mahut	4; 6	3; 6	2; 6
4	(Germany) (France)	Philipp Kohlschreiber; Gilles Simon	7^{7} 6^{5}	6; 4
5	(Germany) (France)	Jan-Lennard Struff; Nicolas Mahut	7^{8} 6^{6}	6; 3

=== Great Britain vs. United States ===
Great Britain
3
Commonwealth Arena, Glasgow, Great Britain
6–8 March 2015
Hard (i)

United States
2

			1	2	3	4	5
1	(United Kingdom) (United States)	Andy Murray; Donald Young	6; 1	6; 1	4; 6	6; 2
2	(United Kingdom) (United States)	James Ward; John Isner	6^{4} 7^{7}	5; 7	6; 3	7^{7} 6^{3}	15; 13
3	(United Kingdom) (United States)	Dominic Inglot / Jamie Murray; Bob Bryan / Mike Bryan	3; 6	2; 6	6; 3	7^{10} 6^{8}	7; 9
4	(United Kingdom) (United States)	Andy Murray; John Isner	7^{7} 6^{4}	6; 3	7^{7} 6^{4}
5	(United Kingdom) (United States)	James Ward; Donald Young	7; 5	0; 1				retired

- The Isner-Ward match was the longest Davis Cup match involving a United States player since the introduction of the tiebreaker in 1989.
- Great Britain's victory over the United States was their first win over this country at home since 1935.

=== Czech Republic vs. Australia ===
Czech Republic
2
ČEZ Aréna, Ostrava, Czech Republic
6–8 March 2015
Hard (i)

Australia
3

			1	2	3	4	5
1	(Czech Republic) (Australia)	Lukáš Rosol; Thanasi Kokkinakis	6; 4	6; 2	5; 7	5; 7	3; 6
2	(Czech Republic) (Australia)	Jiří Veselý; Bernard Tomic	4; 6	3; 6	6^{5} 7^{7}
3	(Czech Republic) (Australia)	Jiří Veselý / Adam Pavlásek; Sam Groth / Lleyton Hewitt	1; 6	7^{7} 6^{2}	3; 6	7^{7} 6^{4}	6; 2
4	(Czech Republic) (Australia)	Lukáš Rosol; Bernard Tomic	6^{4} 7^{7}	3; 6	6^{5} 7^{7}
5	(Czech Republic) (Australia)	Jan Mertl; Sam Groth	6; 3	6; 2

- This was Australia's first World Group win since 2006.

=== Kazakhstan vs. Italy ===
Kazakhstan
3
National Tennis Center, Astana, Kazakhstan
6–8 March 2015
Hard (i)

Italy
2

			1	2	3	4	5
1	(Kazakhstan) (Italy)	Mikhail Kukushkin; Simone Bolelli	7^{8} 6^{6}	6; 1	6; 2
2	(Kazakhstan) (Italy)	Andrey Golubev; Andreas Seppi	3; 6	3; 6	7^{7} 6^{5}	2; 6
3	(Kazakhstan) (Italy)	Andrey Golubev / Aleksandr Nedovyesov; Fabio Fognini / Simone Bolelli	6^{4} 7^{7}	3; 6	7^{15} 6^{13}	4; 6
4	(Kazakhstan) (Italy)	Mikhail Kukushkin; Andreas Seppi	7^{10} 6^{8}	6; 0	6; 4
5	(Kazakhstan) (Italy)	Aleksandr Nedovyesov; Fabio Fognini	7^{7} 6^{5}	3; 6	4; 6	6; 3	7; 5

=== Argentina vs. Brazil ===
Argentina
3
Tecnópolis, Buenos Aires, Argentina
6–8 March 2015
Clay

Brazil
2

			1	2	3	4	5
1	(Argentina) (Brazil)	Carlos Berlocq; João Souza	4; 6	6; 3	7; 5	3; 6	2; 6
2	(Argentina) (Brazil)	Leonardo Mayer; Thomaz Bellucci	6; 4	6; 3	1; 6	6; 3
3	(Argentina) (Brazil)	Carlos Berlocq / Diego Schwartzman; Marcelo Melo / Bruno Soares	5; 7	3; 6	4; 6
4	(Argentina) (Brazil)	Leonardo Mayer; João Souza	7^{7} 6^{4}	7^{7} 6^{5}	5; 7	5; 7	15; 13
5	(Argentina) (Brazil)	Federico Delbonis; Thomaz Bellucci	6; 3	3; 6	6; 2	7; 5

- The Mayer-Souza match set the record for the longest Davis Cup singles rubber, lasting for 6 hours and 42 minutes, eclipsing the previous record by 20 minutes which was from the McEnroe-Wilander match in 1982. It is the second longest tour match in history, behind the Isner-Mahut match from Wimbledon 2010.

=== Serbia vs. Croatia ===
Serbia
5
Kraljevo Sports Hall, Kraljevo, Serbia
6–8 March 2015
Hard (i)

Croatia
0

			1	2	3	4	5
1	(Serbia) (Croatia)	Novak Djokovic; Mate Delić	6; 3	6; 2	6; 4
2	(Serbia) (Croatia)	Viktor Troicki; Borna Ćorić	4; 6	1; 6	6; 3	6; 2	6; 1
3	(Serbia) (Croatia)	Novak Djokovic / Nenad Zimonjić; Marin Draganja / Franko Škugor	6; 3	6; 4	6; 1
4	(Serbia) (Croatia)	Filip Krajinović; Franko Škugor	6; 4	6; 2
5	(Serbia) (Croatia)	Viktor Troicki; Mate Delić	6; 4	6; 3

=== Canada vs. Japan ===
Canada
3
Doug Mitchell Thunderbird Sports Centre, Vancouver, Canada
6–8 March 2015
Hard (i)

Japan
2

			1	2	3	4	5
1	(Canada) (Japan)	Milos Raonic; Tatsuma Ito	6; 2	6; 1	6; 2
2	(Canada) (Japan)	Vasek Pospisil; Kei Nishikori	4; 6	6^{5} 7^{7}	3; 6
3	(Canada) (Japan)	Daniel Nestor / Vasek Pospisil; Go Soeda / Yasutaka Uchiyama	7; 5	2; 6	6; 3	3; 6	6; 3
4	(Canada) (Japan)	Milos Raonic; Kei Nishikori	6; 3	3; 6	4; 6	6; 2	4; 6
5	(Canada) (Japan)	Vasek Pospisil; Go Soeda	7; 5	6; 3	6; 4

=== Belgium vs. Switzerland ===
Belgium
3
Country Hall Ethias Liège, Liège, Belgium
6–8 March 2015
Hard (i)

Switzerland
2

			1	2	3	4	5
1	(Belgium) (Switzerland)	Ruben Bemelmans; Henri Laaksonen	6; 1	7^{8} 6^{6}	4; 6	0; 6	2; 6
2	(Belgium) (Switzerland)	Steve Darcis; Michael Lammer	6; 3	6; 1	6; 3
3	(Belgium) (Switzerland)	Ruben Bemelmans / Niels Desein; Adrien Bossel / Michael Lammer	1; 6	6; 3	6; 2	6; 2
4	(Belgium) (Switzerland)	Steve Darcis; Henri Laaksonen	3; 6	6; 3	6; 3	6^{5} 7^{7}	1; 6
5	(Belgium) (Switzerland)	David Goffin; Adrien Bossel	6; 4	6; 0	6; 4

- Belgium won a World Group tie for the first time since 2007.

== Quarterfinals ==
=== Great Britain vs. France ===
Great Britain
3
Queen's Club, London, Great Britain
17–19 July 2015
Grass

France
1

			1	2	3	4	5
1	(United Kingdom) (France)	James Ward; Gilles Simon	4; 6	4; 6	1; 6
2	(United Kingdom) (France)	Andy Murray; Jo-Wilfried Tsonga	7; 5	7^{12} 6^{10}	6; 2
3	(United Kingdom) (France)	Andy Murray / Jamie Murray; Nicolas Mahut / Jo-Wilfried Tsonga	4; 6	6; 3	7^{7} 6^{5}	6; 1
4	(United Kingdom) (France)	Andy Murray; Gilles Simon	4; 6	7^{7} 6^{5}	6; 3	6; 0
5	(United Kingdom) (France)	James Ward; Jo-Wilfried Tsonga						not played

- Great Britain won a quarterfinal match for the first time since 1981.
- It is the first time since 1998 that siblings have combined to win three points in a world group tie. The Black brothers Byron and Wayne did so for Zimbabwe against Australia.

=== Australia vs. Kazakhstan ===
Australia
3
Marrara Sporting Complex, Darwin, Australia
17–19 July 2015
Grass

Kazakhstan
2

			1	2	3	4	5
1	(Australia) (Kazakhstan)	Thanasi Kokkinakis; Mikhail Kukushkin	4; 6	3; 6	3; 6
2	(Australia) (Kazakhstan)	Nick Kyrgios; Aleksandr Nedovyesov	6^{5} 7^{7}	7^{7} 6^{2}	6^{5} 7^{7}	4; 6
3	(Australia) (Kazakhstan)	Sam Groth / Lleyton Hewitt; Andrey Golubev / Aleksandr Nedovyesov	6; 4	7^{7} 6^{4}	6; 2
4	(Australia) (Kazakhstan)	Sam Groth; Mikhail Kukushkin	6; 3	7^{8} 6^{6}	4; 6	7^{8} 6^{6}
5	(Australia) (Kazakhstan)	Lleyton Hewitt; Aleksandr Nedovyesov	7^{7} 6^{2}	6; 2	6; 3

- It was the first time in 76 years that Australia had come back from 2–0 down to win.
- It was the first time that all four nominated players had played in a singles live rubber tie for Australia.
- Australia made it into the semifinals for the first time since 2006.
- Despite having played Davis Cup for 17 years it was the first time that Hewitt had played in the deciding rubber.

=== Argentina vs. Serbia ===
Argentina
4
Tecnópolis, Buenos Aires, Argentina
17–19 July 2015
Clay (i)

Serbia
1

			1	2	3	4	5
1	(Argentina) (Serbia)	Leonardo Mayer; Filip Krajinović	6; 4	6; 2	6; 1
2	(Argentina) (Serbia)	Federico Delbonis; Viktor Troicki	2; 6	2; 6	6; 4	6; 4	6; 2
3	(Argentina) (Serbia)	Carlos Berlocq / Leonardo Mayer; Viktor Troicki / Nenad Zimonjić	6; 2	6; 4	6; 1
4	(Argentina) (Serbia)	Diego Schwartzman; Dušan Lajović	1; 6	4; 6
5	(Argentina) (Serbia)	Carlos Berlocq; Filip Krajinović	6; 1	3; 0				retired

=== Belgium vs. Canada ===
Belgium
5
Sportpark Krokodiel, Middelkerke, Belgium
17–19 July 2015
Clay

Canada
0

			1	2	3	4	5
1	(Belgium) (Canada)	Steve Darcis; Frank Dancevic	3; 6	6; 1	7; 5	6; 3
2	(Belgium) (Canada)	David Goffin; Filip Peliwo	6; 4	6; 4	6; 2
3	(Belgium) (Canada)	Ruben Bemelmans / Kimmer Coppejans; Daniel Nestor / Adil Shamasdin	7; 5	3; 6	6; 4	6; 3
4	(Belgium) (Canada)	Kimmer Coppejans; Frank Dancevic	2; 6	6; 2	6; 3
5	(Belgium) (Canada)	Steve Darcis; Filip Peliwo	6; 4	6; 3

- Belgium advanced to the semifinals for the first time since 1999.

== Semifinals ==
=== Great Britain vs. Australia ===
Great Britain
3
Commonwealth Arena, Glasgow, Great Britain
18–20 September 2015
Hard (i)

Australia
2

			1	2	3	4	5
1	(United Kingdom) (Australia)	Andy Murray; Thanasi Kokkinakis	6; 3	6; 0	6; 3
2	(United Kingdom) (Australia)	Dan Evans; Bernard Tomic	3; 6	6^{2} 7^{7}	7^{7} 6^{4}	4; 6
3	(United Kingdom) (Australia)	Andy Murray / Jamie Murray; Sam Groth / Lleyton Hewitt	4; 6	6; 3	6; 4	6^{6} 7^{8}	6; 4
4	(United Kingdom) (Australia)	Andy Murray; Bernard Tomic	7; 5	6; 3	6; 2
5	(United Kingdom) (Australia)	Dan Evans; Thanasi Kokkinakis	5; 7	4; 6

- Great Britain reach their first final since 1978.

=== Belgium vs. Argentina ===
Belgium
3
Forest National, Brussels, Belgium
18–20 September 2015
Hard (i)

Argentina
2

			1	2	3	4	5
1	(Belgium) (Argentina)	David Goffin; Federico Delbonis	7; 5	7^{7} 6^{3}	6; 3
2	(Belgium) (Argentina)	Steve Darcis; Leonardo Mayer	6^{5} 7^{7}	6^{1} 7^{7}	6; 4	3; 6
3	(Belgium) (Argentina)	Ruben Bemelmans / Steve Darcis; Carlos Berlocq / Leonardo Mayer	2; 6	6^{1} 7^{7}	7; 5	6^{5} 7^{7}
4	(Belgium) (Argentina)	David Goffin; Diego Schwartzman	6; 3	6; 2	6; 1
5	(Belgium) (Argentina)	Steve Darcis; Federico Delbonis	6; 4	2; 6	7; 5	7^{7} 6^{3}

- Belgium reach their first final since 1904 and equal their best Davis Cup performance.

== Final ==
=== Belgium vs. Great Britain ===
Belgium
1
Flanders Expo, Ghent, Belgium
27–29 November 2015
Clay (i)

Great Britain
3

			1	2	3	4	5
1	(Belgium) (United Kingdom)	David Goffin; Kyle Edmund	3; 6	1; 6	6; 2	6; 1	6; 0
2	(Belgium) (United Kingdom)	Ruben Bemelmans; Andy Murray	3; 6	2; 6	5; 7
3	(Belgium) (United Kingdom)	Steve Darcis / David Goffin; Andy Murray / Jamie Murray	4; 6	6; 4	3; 6	2; 6
4	(Belgium) (United Kingdom)	David Goffin; Andy Murray	3; 6	5; 7	3; 6
5	(Belgium) (United Kingdom)	Ruben Bemelmans; Kyle Edmund						not played

- Great Britain win their 10th Davis Cup and their first since 1936.
- Andy Murray becomes the third player to finish with an 8–0 record in the singles after John McEnroe and Mats Wilander.
- Andy Murray becomes the fourth player to finish with an 11–0 record in the singles and doubles.
