= Matej Sabanov =

Serbian tennis player

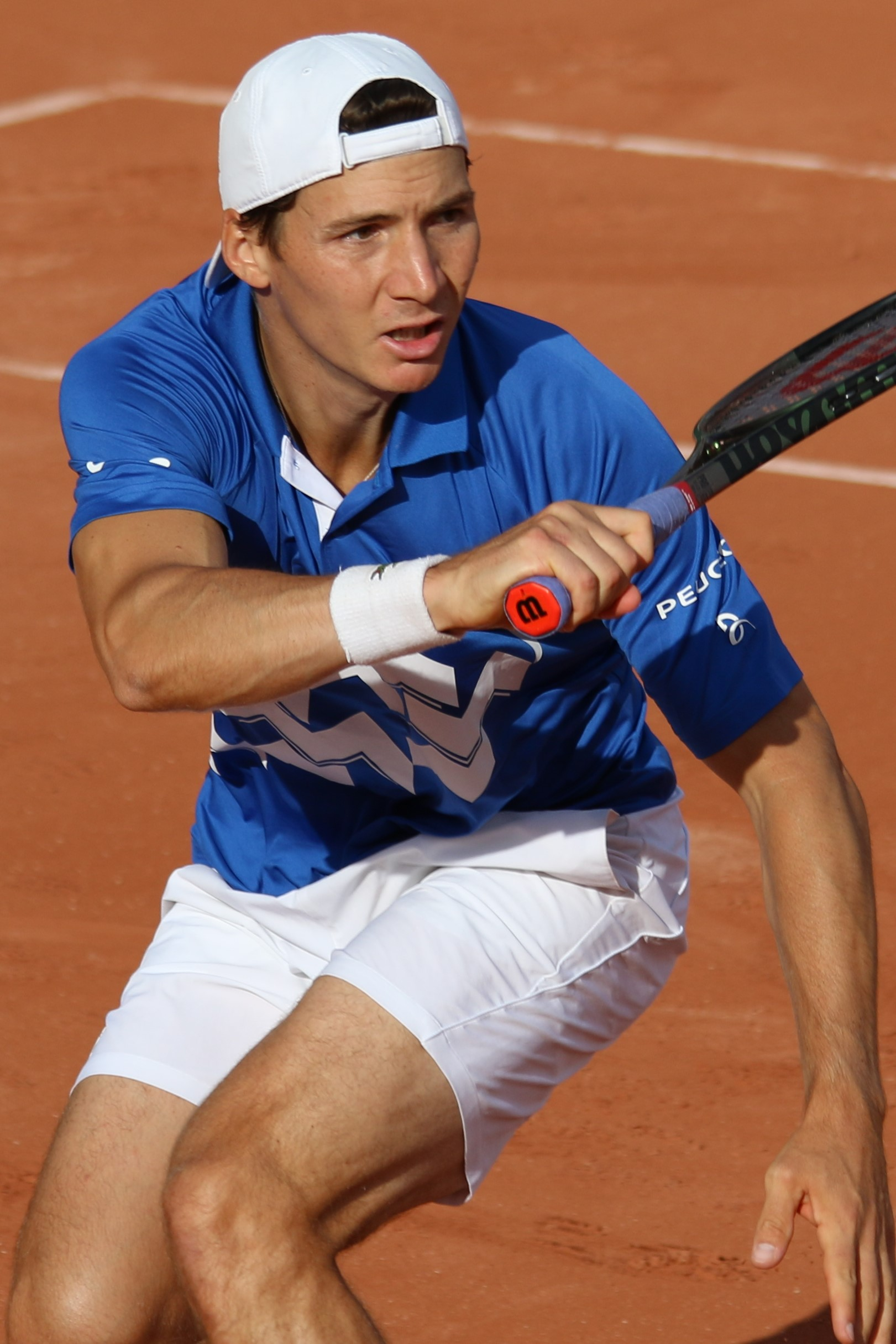
- Sabanov at the 2022 French Open
- Country (sports): Croatia (2010–2021); Serbia (2021–current)
- Residence: Palić, Serbia
- Born: 25 June 1992 (age 34) Subotica, Serbia, FR Yugoslavia
- Height: 1.78 m (5 ft 10 in)
- Turned pro: 2010
- Plays: Right-handed (two-handed backhand)
- Coach: Aleksandar Sabanov
- Prize money: US $328,270

Singles
- Career record: 0–0
- Career titles: 0; 0 Challenger, 1 Futures
- Highest ranking: No. 640 (20 October 2014)

Doubles
- Career record: 23–33
- Career titles: 1; 6 Challenger, 26 Futures
- Highest ranking: No. 72 (18 April 2022)
- Current ranking: No. 153 (24 February 2025)

Grand Slam doubles results
- Australian Open: 1R (2022, 2023)
- French Open: 1R (2022)
- Wimbledon: 1R (2021)
- Last updated on: 26 February 2025.

Matej Sabanov (Serbian Cyrillic: Матеј Сабанов; born 25 June 1992) is a Serbian tennis player who specializes in doubles. He has a career high ATP doubles ranking of World No. 72 achieved on 18 April 2022. He also has a career high ATP singles ranking of No. 640 achieved on 20 October 2014.

He has won one ATP doubles title with his twin brother Ivan and 6 ATP Challengers and 26 ITF doubles titles. Sabanov formerly represented Croatia.

== Early life and career ==
Matej and Ivan Sabanov are twin brothers born in Subotica, a city that was part of the Federal Republic of Yugoslavia at the time, near the Croatian and Hungarian borders. They began playing tennis at the age of five or six and grew up competing alongside Serbian players such as Filip Krajinović and Dušan Lajović. Following the dissolution of Yugoslavia, Subotica became part of Serbia and Montenegro in 2003 and later Serbia in 2006.

At the age of 15, the twins moved to Osijek, Croatia, where their mother worked as a teacher. The move provided them with access to indoor courts, which were unavailable in Subotica. Around that time, they chose to represent Croatia in their professional careers. However, after their mother’s retirement, the family returned to Palić, near their hometown of Subotica.

During this period, they received strong support from Serbian tennis star Novak Djokovic, who closely followed their progress and allowed them to train at his Belgrade academy free of charge. They remained closely connected to Serbian players they had grown up with, and in November 2021, they announced their decision to switch national representation to Serbia. Reports suggested that the move was partly influenced by their ambition to compete in doubles for Serbia in the Davis Cup and ATP Cup, as Croatia already had an established doubles team featuring players like Mate Pavić, Nikola Mektić, and Ivan Dodig.

== Professional career ==
Sabanov made his ATP main draw debut at the 2018 Croatia Open Umag in the doubles draw as a wildcard pair partnering his twin brother Ivan.

His best career performance came in 2021 when he won his first ATP doubles title by winning the Serbia Open with his brother Ivan. They defeated Gonzalo Escobar and Ariel Behar in the final.

Sabanov represented Serbia at the 2022 ATP Cup, partnering with Nikola Ćaćić in doubles. The duo played in two ties, losing a decisive match against Chile in the third set, while winning their match against Spain in three sets.

He was part of Serbia's squad for the 2025 Davis Cup Qualifiers first round tie against Denmark in Copenhagen but did not feature in any matches.

== ATP career finals ==
=== Doubles: 2 (1 title, 1 runners-up) ===
Legend Grand Slam tournaments (0–0) ATP Tour Finals (0–0) ATP Tour Masters 1000 (0–0) ATP Tour 500 Series (0–0) ATP Tour 250 Series (1–1)	Titles by surface Hard (0–0) Clay (1–1) Grass (0–0)	Titles by setting Outdoor (1–1) Indoor (0–0)

Result	W–L	Date	Tournament	Tier	Surface	Partner	Opponents	Score
Win	1–0	Apr 2021	Serbia Open, Serbia	250 Series	Clay	(Croatia) Ivan Sabanov	(Uruguay) Ariel Behar (Ecuador) Gonzalo Escobar	6–3, 7–6^{(7–5)}
Loss	1–1	Apr 2022	U.S. Men's Clay Court Championships, United States	250 Series	Clay	(Serbia) Ivan Sabanov	(Australia) Matthew Ebden (Australia) Max Purcell	3–6, 3–6

== ATP Challenger and ITF Futures finals ==
=== Singles: 2 (1–1) ===
Legend ATP Challenger (0–0) ITF Futures (1–1)	Finals by surface Hard (0–0) Clay (1–1) Grass (0–0)

Result	W–L	Date	Tournament	Tier	Surface	Opponent	Score
Loss	0–1	Dec 2013	Croatia F17, Bol	Futures	Clay	(Croatia) Toni Androić	1–6, 1–6
Win	1–1	Jul 2014	Serbia F5, Belgrade	Futures	Clay	(Chile) Juan Carlos Sáez	6–0, 6–2

=== Doubles: 80 (34–46) ===
Legend ATP Challenger (6–16) ITF Futures (28–30)	Finals by surface Hard (8–10) Clay (26–36) Grass (0–0)

Result	W–L	Date	Tournament	Tier	Surface	Partner	Opponents	Score
Loss	0–1	Feb 2012	Croatia F2, Zagreb	Futures	Hard	(Croatia) Ivan Sabanov	(Romania) Andrei Dăescu (Romania) Florin Mergea	6–4, 4–6, [4–10]
Win	1–1	Jul 2012	Serbia F3, Belgrade	Futures	Clay	(Serbia) Ivan Bjelica	(Austria) Maximilian Neuchrist (Austria) Nicolas Reissig	6–4, 6–1
Loss	1–2	Jul 2012	Serbia F4, Belgrade	Futures	Clay	(Serbia) Ivan Bjelica	(Bosnia and Herzegovina) Ismar Gorčić (Bosnia and Herzegovina) Aldin Šetkić	6–4, 2–6, [4–10]
Loss	1–3	Aug 2012	Serbia F7, Sombor	Futures	Clay	(Serbia) Ivan Bjelica	(Bosnia and Herzegovina) Ismar Gorčić (Bosnia and Herzegovina) Aldin Šetkić	2–6, 6–7^{(1–7)}
Loss	1–4	Sep 2012	Croatia F9, Osijek	Futures	Clay	(Serbia) Ivan Bjelica	(Bosnia and Herzegovina) Tomislav Brkić (Bosnia and Herzegovina) Aldin Šetkić	4–6, 1–6
Loss	1–5	Oct 2012	Croatia F11, Dubrovnik	Futures	Clay	(Serbia) Ivan Bjelica	(Croatia) Toni Androić (Croatia) Dino Marcan	3–6, 3–6
Loss	1–6	Jul 2013	Serbia F4, Belgrade	Futures	Clay	(Serbia) Ivan Bjelica	(Serbia) Marko Djokovic (United Kingdom) Matthew Short	4–6, 4–6
Loss	1–7	Jul 2013	Serbia F5, Belgrade	Futures	Clay	(Croatia) Ivan Sabanov	(Serbia) Djordje Djokovic (United Kingdom) Matthew Short	5–7, 3–6
Win	2–7	Aug 2013	Serbia F7, Sombor	Futures	Clay	(Croatia) Ivan Sabanov	(Bulgaria) Dinko Halachev (France) Gleb Sakharov	4–6, 7–5, [10–5]
Loss	2–8	Aug 2013	Serbia F9, Novi Sad	Futures	Clay	(Croatia) Ivan Sabanov	(Slovakia) Patrik Fabian (Italy) Matteo Fago	5–7, 3–6
Loss	2–9	Aug 2013	Croatia F8, Vinkovci	Futures	Clay	(Croatia) Ivan Sabanov	(Croatia) Toni Androić (Croatia) Tomislav Draganja	6–1, 6–7^{(7–9)}, [8–10]
Loss	2–10	Nov 2013	Croatia F14, Umag	Futures	Clay	(Croatia) Ivan Sabanov	(Croatia) Antonio Šančić (Croatia) Dino Marcan	0–6, 7–5, [2–10]
Win	3–10	Aug 2014	Serbia F7, Sombor	Futures	Clay	(Croatia) Ivan Sabanov	(Australia) Gavin Van Peperzeel (France) Alexis Musialek	7–6^{(7–5)}, 6–1
Loss	3–11	Aug 2014	Serbia F9, Novi Sad	Futures	Clay	(Croatia) Ivan Sabanov	(Serbia) Ilija Vucic (Serbia) Danilo Petrovic	4–6, 3–6
Win	4–11	Aug 2014	Serbia F10, Novi Sad	Futures	Clay	(Croatia) Ivan Sabanov	(Serbia) Ilija Vucic (Serbia) Danilo Petrovic	6–3, 3–6, [10–6]
Win	5–11	Sep 2014	Serbia F13, Niš	Futures	Clay	(Croatia) Ivan Sabanov	(North Macedonia) Dimitar Grabul (North Macedonia) Tomislav Jotovski	6–4, 6–2
Win	6–11	Sep 2014	Serbia F14, Sokobanja	Futures	Clay	(Croatia) Ivan Sabanov	(Russia) Georgyi Malyshev (Austria) Marcel Waloch	6–2, 6–2
Loss	6–12	Nov 2014	Norway F1, Oslo	Futures	Hard	(Croatia) Ivan Sabanov	(Sweden) Patrik Rosenholm (United Kingdom) Darren Walsh	4–6, 6–3, [8–10]
Win	7–12	Nov 2014	Norway F2, Oslo	Futures	Hard	(Croatia) Ivan Sabanov	(Netherlands) Sander Arends (United Kingdom) Darren Walsh	4–6, 6–3, [10–4]
Win	8–12	Mar 2015	Croatia F5, Pula	Futures	Clay	(Croatia) Ivan Sabanov	(Czech Republic) Zdeněk Kolář (Czech Republic) Dominik Suc	4–6, 6–0, [10–7]
Win	9–12	Apr 2015	Croatia F7, Vrsar	Futures	Clay	(Croatia) Ivan Sabanov	(Romania) A-D Carpen (Croatia) Tomislav Draganja	6–7^{(3–7)}, 6–4, [10–8]
Loss	9–13	May 2015	Croatia F8, Bol	Futures	Clay	(Croatia) Ivan Sabanov	(France) Grégoire Barrère (France) Jérôme Inzerillo	6–4, 5–7, [6–10]
Win	10–13	May 2015	Bosnia & Herzegovina F2, Prijedor	Futures	Clay	(Croatia) Ivan Sabanov	(Ukraine) Danylo Kalenichenko (Slovakia) Juraj Masar	walkover
Loss	10–14	May 2015	Bosnia & Herzegovina F3, Brčko	Futures	Clay	(Croatia) Ivan Sabanov	(Romania) Victor Vlad Cornea (Romania) Tudor Cristian Sulea	2–6, 4–6
Loss	10–15	Jul 2015	Serbia F4, Belgrade	Futures	Clay	(Croatia) Ivan Sabanov	(Croatia) Tomislav Draganja (Serbia) Ivan Bjelica	5–7, 6–7^{(3–7)}
Win	11–15	Aug 2015	Serbia F7, Sombor	Futures	Clay	(Croatia) Ivan Sabanov	(Serbia) Miki Janković (Bosnia and Herzegovina) Nerman Fatić	6–4, 6–0
Win	12–15	Aug 2015	Serbia F9, Novi Sad	Futures	Clay	(Croatia) Ivan Sabanov	(Italy) Fabio Mercuri (Italy) Luca Pancaldi	6–3, 6–0
Loss	12–16	Aug 2015	Serbia F10, Subotica	Futures	Clay	(Croatia) Ivan Sabanov	(Italy) Marco Bortolotti (Italy) Pietro Rondoni	6–1, 2–6, [8–10]
Win	13–16	Oct 2015	Norway F1, Oslo	Futures	Hard	(Croatia) Ivan Sabanov	(Netherlands) Scott Griekspoor (Netherlands) Tallon Griekspoor	6–3, 6–4
Loss	13–17	Nov 2015	Norway F2, Oslo	Futures	Hard	(Croatia) Ivan Sabanov	(Belgium) Joran Vliegen (Belgium) Sander Gillé	7–6^{(7–4)}, 6–7^{(5–7)}, [8–10]
Loss	13–18	Nov 2015	Norway F3, Oslo	Futures	Hard	(Croatia) Ivan Sabanov	(Belgium) Joran Vliegen (Belgium) Sander Gillé	6–7^{(3–7)}, 1–6
Loss	13–19	Mar 2016	Croatia F4, Opatija	Futures	Clay	(Croatia) Ivan Sabanov	(Croatia) Tomislav Draganja (Croatia) Nino Serdarušić	4–6, 6–7^{(10–12)}
Loss	13–20	Jun 2016	Bosnia & Herzegovina F4, Sarajevo	Futures	Clay	(Croatia) Ivan Sabanov	(Croatia) Tomislav Draganja (Croatia) Nino Serdarušić	5–7, 3–6
Win	14–20	Feb 2017	Turkey F6, Antalya	Futures	Hard	(Croatia) Ivan Sabanov	(Ukraine) Vadym Ursu (Ukraine) Volodymyr Uzhylovskyi	4–6, 6–0, [12–10]
Win	15–20	Feb 2017	Turkey F7, Antalya	Futures	Hard	(Croatia) Ivan Sabanov	(Ukraine) Vadym Ursu (Ukraine) Volodymyr Uzhylovskyi	7–6^{(7–4)}, 6–2
Loss	15–21	Mar 2017	Croatia F2, Poreč	Futures	Clay	(Croatia) Ivan Sabanov	(Czech Republic) Zdeněk Kolář (Croatia) Nino Serdarušić	3–6, 3–6
Win	16–21	Jun 2017	Hungary F5, Budapest	Futures	Clay	(Croatia) Ivan Sabanov	(Austria) Maximilian Neuchrist (Austria) David Pichler	6–4, 7–6^{(7–2)}
Loss	16–22	Jul 2017	Czech Republic F5, Pardubice	Futures	Clay	(Croatia) Ivan Sabanov	(Czech Republic) Vit Kopriva (Czech Republic) Jaroslav Pospíšil	6–4, 1–6, [2–10]
Loss	16–23	Aug 2017	Serbia F2, Novi Sad	Futures	Clay	(Croatia) Ivan Sabanov	(Australia) Dane Propoggia (Australia) Scott Puodziunas	6–7^{(8–10)}, 7–5, [9–11]
Win	17–23	Sep 2017	Hungary F7, Kecskemét	Futures	Clay	(Spain) Enrique López Pérez	(Sweden) Filip Bergevi (Sweden) Markus Eriksson	7–5, 6–3
Win	18–23	Oct 2017	Nigeria F4, Lagos	Futures	Hard	(Croatia) Ivan Sabanov	(France) Tom Jomby (France) Johan Sebastien Tatlot	4–6, 7–5, [10–5]
Win	19–23	Oct 2017	Nigeria F5, Lagos	Futures	Hard	(Croatia) Ivan Sabanov	(India) Chandril Sood (India) Lakshit Sood	6–3, 6–4
Loss	19–24	Nov 2017	Bangalore, India	Challenger	Hard	(Croatia) Ivan Sabanov	(Russia) Mikhail Elgin (India) Divij Sharan	3–6, 0–6
Win	20–24	Mar 2018	Croatia F1, Rovinj	Futures	Clay	(Croatia) Ivan Sabanov	(Spain) Javier Barranco Cosano (Italy) Marco Bortolotti	6–4, 6–3
Loss	20–25	Mar 2018	Croatia F2, Poreč	Futures	Clay	(Croatia) Ivan Sabanov	(Ecuador) Gonzalo Escobar (Brazil) Bruno Sant'Anna	4–6, 7–5, [9–11]
Win	21–25	Sep 2018	Serbia F4, Subotica	Futures	Clay	(Croatia) Ivan Sabanov	(Czech Republic) Vit Kopriva (Czech Republic) Jaroslav Pospíšil	6–2, 6–1
Win	22–25	Jan 2019	M15 Antalya, Turkey	World Tennis Tour	Clay	(Croatia) Ivan Sabanov	(Turkey) Sarp Ağabigün (Romania) Nicolae Frunză	6–1, 7–5
Win	23–25	Feb 2019	M15 Antalya, Turkey	World Tennis Tour	Clay	(Croatia) Ivan Sabanov	(Switzerland) Louroi Martinez (Switzerland) Damien Wenger	6–1, 6–1
Loss	23–26	Feb 2019	M15 Aktobe, Kazakhstan	World Tennis Tour	Hard	(Croatia) Ivan Sabanov	(Netherlands) Niels Lootsma (Russia) Aleksandr Vasilenko	2–6, 6–7^{(5–7)}
Loss	23–27	Mar 2019	M15 Rovinj, Croatia	World Tennis Tour	Clay	(Croatia) Ivan Sabanov	(Belgium) Jeroen Vanneste (Sweden) Markus Eriksson	5–7, 2–6
Win	24–27	Mar 2019	M15 Opatija, Croatia	World Tennis Tour	Clay	(Croatia) Ivan Sabanov	(Czech Republic) Ondrej Krstev (Czech Republic) Robin Stanek	6–1, 6–4
Loss	24–28	Apr 2019	M25 Santa Margherita, Italy	World Tennis Tour	Clay	(Croatia) Ivan Sabanov	(Italy) Marco Bortolotti (Australia) Scott Puodziunas	2–6, 4–6
Loss	24–29	May 2019	M25+H Jablonec, Czech Republic	World Tennis Tour	Clay	(Croatia) Ivan Sabanov	(Czech Republic) Václav Šafránek (Czech Republic) Jan Šátral	6–7^{(4–7)}, 6–0, [8–10]
Win	25–29	Jul 2019	M25 Casinalbo, Italy	World Tennis Tour	Clay	(Croatia) Ivan Sabanov	(France) Sadio Doumbia (Russia) Kirill Kivattsev	6–7^{(6–8)}, 6–3, [10–7]
Win	26–29	Jul 2019	San Benedetto, Italy	Challenger	Clay	(Croatia) Ivan Sabanov	(Peru) Sergio Galdós (Peru) Juan Pablo Varillas	6–4, 4–6, [10–5]
Win	27–29	Jul 2019	M25+H Pontedera, Italy	World Tennis Tour	Clay	(Croatia) Ivan Sabanov	(Australia) Adam Taylor (Australia) Jason Taylor	7–6^{(7–5)}, 6–2
Loss	27–30	Aug 2019	Augsburg, Germany	Challenger	Clay	(Croatia) Ivan Sabanov	(Belarus) Andrei Vasilevski (Slovakia) Igor Zelenay	6–4, 4–6, [3–10]
Loss	27–31	Sep 2019	M25 Győr, Hungary	World Tennis Tour	Clay	(Croatia) Ivan Sabanov	(Ecuador) Diego Hidalgo (Brazil) Pedro Sakamoto	4–6, 1–6
Loss	27–32	Sep 2019	Sibiu, Romania	Challenger	Clay	(Croatia) Ivan Sabanov	(France) Sadio Doumbia (France) Fabien Reboul	4–6, 6–3, [7–10]
Loss	27–33	Feb 2020	Quimper, France	Challenger	Hard	(Croatia) Ivan Sabanov	(Kazakhstan) Andrey Golubev (Kazakhstan) Aleksandr Nedovyesov	4–6, 2–6
Loss	27–34	Nov 2020	Ortisei, Italy	Challenger	Hard	(Croatia) Ivan Sabanov	(Germany) Andre Begemann (France) Albano Olivetti	3–6, 2–6
Loss	27–35	May 2021	Prague, Czech Republic	Challenger	Clay	(Croatia) Ivan Sabanov	(Australia) Marc Polmans (Ukraine) Sergiy Stakhovsky	3–6, 4–6
Loss	27–36	Jul 2021	Braunschweig, Germany	Challenger	Clay	(Croatia) Ivan Sabanov	(Poland) Szymon Walków (Poland) Jan Zieliński	4–6, 6–4, [4–10]
Win	28–36	Aug 2021	Lüdenscheid, Germany	Challenger	Clay	(Croatia) Ivan Sabanov	(Ukraine) Denys Molchanov (Kazakhstan) Aleksandr Nedovyesov	6–4, 2–6, [12–10]
Loss	28–37	Sep 2021	Banja Luka, Bosnia and Hervegovina	Challenger	Clay	(Croatia) Ivan Sabanov	(Croatia) Antonio Šančić (Croatia) Nino Serdarušić	3–6, 3–6
Loss	28–38	Mar 2022	Roseto degli Abruzzi, Italy	Challenger	Clay	(Serbia) Ivan Sabanov	(Italy) Franco Agamenone (France) Manuel Guinard	6–7^{(2–7)}, 6–7^{(3–7)}
Loss	28–39	Aug 2022	Cordenons, Italy	Challenger	Clay	(Serbia) Ivan Sabanov	(Jamaica) Dustin Brown (Italy) Andrea Vavassori	4–6, 5–7
Loss	28–40	Aug 2022	San Marino, San Marino	Challenger	Clay	(Serbia) Ivan Sabanov	(Italy) Marco Bortolotti (Spain) Sergio Martos Gornés	4–6, 4–6
Win	29–40	Sep 2022	Sibiu, Romania	Challenger	Clay	(Serbia) Ivan Sabanov	(Austria) Alexander Erler (Austria) Lucas Miedler	3–6, 7–5, [10–4]
Loss	29–41	Nov 2022	Valencia, Spain	Challenger	Hard	(Serbia) Ivan Sabanov	(Ukraine) Oleksii Krutykh (Spain) Oriol Roca Batalla	3–6, 6–7^{(3–7)}
Win	30–41	Mar 2023	Waco, US	Challenger	Hard	(Serbia) Ivan Sabanov	(United States) Evan King (United States) Mitchell Krueger	6–1, 3–6, [10–4]
Loss	30–42	Mar 2023	Zadar, Croatia	Challenger	Clay	(Serbia) Ivan Sabanov	(France) Manuel Guinard (Croatia) Nino Serdarušić	4–6, 0–6
Loss	30–43	Oct 2023	Olbia, Italy	Challenger	Hard	(Serbia) Ivan Sabanov	(India) Rithvik Choudary Bollipalli (India) Arjun Kadhe	1–6, 3–6
Win	31–43	Aug 2024	Todi, Italy	Challenger	Clay	(Serbia) Ivan Sabanov	(Sweden) Filip Bergevi (Netherlands) Mick Veldheer	6–4, 7–6^{(7–3)}
Win	32–43	Jan 2025	Oeiras II, Portugal	Challenger	Hard	(Croatia) Mili Poljičak	(Spain) Íñigo Cervantes (Netherlands) Mick Veldheer	6–0, 6–1
Loss	32–44	Aug 2025	Porto, Portugal	Challenger	Clay	(Serbia) Ivan Sabanov	(Poland) Szymon Kielan (Poland) Filip Pieczonka	2–6, 4–6
Win	33–44	Oct 2025	M15 Bol, Croatia	World Tennis Tour	Clay	(Serbia) Ivan Sabanov	(South Africa) Alec Beckley (Serbia) Marko Maksimović	6–4, 6–3
Win	34–44	Apr 2026	M15 Dubrovnik, Croatia	World Tennis Tour	Clay	(Serbia) Ivan Sabanov	(Croatia) Emanuel Ivanišević (Croatia) Josip Šimundža	6–2, 6–2
Loss	34–45	May 2026	M25 Bol, Croatia	World Tennis Tour	Clay	(Croatia) Admir Kalender	(Australia) Thomas Fancutt (New Zealand) Ajeet Rai	6–7^{(3–7)}, 3–6
Loss	34–46	Jul 2026	Iași, Romania	Challenger	Clay	(Serbia) Ivan Sabanov	(Sweden) Erik Grevelius (Sweden) Adam Heinonen	4–6, 2–6
