= 2024 Davis Cup World Group I =

Tennis competition

The 2024 Davis Cup World Group I was held from 13 to 15 September. The twelve winners from the World Group I will play at the qualifying round and the twelve losers will play at the World Group I play-offs in 2025.

== Teams ==
Twenty-four teams participated in the World Group I, in series decided on a home and away basis. The seedings were based on the Nations Ranking.

These twenty-four teams were:

- 12 losing teams from the qualifying round in February 2024
- 12 winning teams from the World Group I play-offs in February 2024

The 12 winning teams from the World Group I will play in the qualifying round and the 12 losing teams will play in the World Group I play-offs in 2025.

#: Nations Ranking as of 5 February 2024.

Seeded teams

1. Serbia (#5)
2. Croatia (#7)
3. Sweden (#18)
4. Kazakhstan (#19)
5. South Korea (#21)
6. Switzerland (#22)
7. Hungary (#23)
8. Portugal (#24)
9. Austria (#25)
10. Bosnia and Herzegovina (#26)
11. Israel (#27)
12. Colombia (#28)

Unseeded teams

- Chinese Taipei (#29)
- Japan (#30)
- Norway (#31)
- Turkey (#32)
- Denmark (#33)
- Peru (#34)
- Ukraine (#35)
- India (#36)
- Greece (#38)
- Lithuania (#40)
- Poland (#41)
- Egypt (#43)

== Results summary ==
Home team	Score	Away team	Location	Venue	Surface
Serbia [1]	3–1	Greece	Belgrade	Aleksandar Nikolić Hall	Hard (i)
Croatia [2]	4–0	Lithuania	Varaždin	Varaždin Arena	Hard (i)
Sweden [3]	4–0	India	Stockholm	Kungliga tennishallen	Hard (i)
Kazakhstan [4]	1–3	Denmark	Astana	National Tennis Centre	Hard (i)
Poland	1–3	South Korea [5]	Zielona Góra	CRS Hall Zielona Góra	Hard (i)
Switzerland [6]	4–0	Peru	Biel/Bienne	Swiss Tennis Arena	Hard (i)
Egypt	2–3	Hungary [7]	Cairo	Gezira Sporting Club	Clay
Norway	3–1	Portugal [8]	Bekkestua	Nadderud Arena	Hard (i)
Austria [9]	3–0	Turkey	Bad Waltersdorf	Sportaktivpark Bad Waltersdorf	Clay
Chinese Taipei	3–2	Bosnia and Herzegovina [10]	Taipei	Taipei Tennis Center	Hard (i)
Israel [11]	3–1	Ukraine	Larnaca (Cyprus)	Herodotou Tennis Academy	Hard
Japan	3–1	Colombia [12]	Tokyo	Ariake Coliseum	Hard

== Results ==
=== Serbia vs. Greece ===
Serbia
3
Aleksandar Nikolić Hall, Belgrade, Serbia
14–15 September 2024
Hard (i)

Greece
1

			1	2	3
1	(Serbia) (Greece)	Miomir Kecmanović; Aristotelis Thanos	6; 3	6; 3
2	(Serbia) (Greece)	Novak Djokovic; Ioannis Xilas	6; 0	6; 1
3	(Serbia) (Greece)	Novak Djokovic / Hamad Medjedovic; Aristotelis Thanos / Petros Tsitsipas	6; 3	3; 6	6; 3
4	(Serbia) (Greece)	Dušan Lajović; Demetris Azoides	6; 1	2; 3		retired
5	(Serbia) (Greece)	Miomir Kecmanović; Ioannis Xilas				not played

=== Croatia vs. Lithuania ===
Croatia
4
Varaždin Arena, Varaždin, Croatia
13–14 September 2024
Hard (i)

Lithuania
0

			1	2	3
1	(Croatia) (Lithuania)	Borna Gojo; Vilius Gaubas	6; 4	6; 2
2	(Croatia) (Lithuania)	Duje Ajduković; Edas Butvilas	7; 5	6^{6} 7^{8}	6; 2
3	(Croatia) (Lithuania)	Mate Pavić / Mili Poljičak; Edas Butvilas / Vilius Gaubas	6; 4	1; 6	6; 3
4	(Croatia) (Lithuania)	Matej Dodig; Vilius Gaubas	6; 3	6; 4
5	(Croatia) (Lithuania)	Borna Gojo; Edas Butvilas				not played

=== Sweden vs. India ===
Sweden
4
Kungliga tennishallen, Stockholm, Sweden
14–15 September 2024
Hard (i)

India
0

			1	2	3
1	(Sweden) (India)	Elias Ymer; Sriram Balaji	6; 4	6; 2
2	(Sweden) (India)	Leo Borg; Ramkumar Ramanathan	6; 3	6; 4
3	(Sweden) (India)	Filip Bergevi / André Göransson; Sriram Balaji / Ramkumar Ramanathan	6; 3	6; 4
4	(Sweden) (India)	Elias Ymer; Siddharth Vishwakarma	6; 2	6; 2
5	(Sweden) (India)	Leo Borg; Sriram Balaji				not played

=== Kazakhstan vs. Denmark ===
Kazakhstan
1
National Tennis Centre, Astana, Kazakhstan
14–15 September 2024
Hard (i)

Denmark
3

			1	2	3
1	(Kazakhstan) (Denmark)	Alexander Bublik; Elmer Møller	6; 1	2; 6	2; 6
2	(Kazakhstan) (Denmark)	Alexander Shevchenko; August Holmgren	6^{4} 7^{7}	3; 6
3	(Kazakhstan) (Denmark)	Alexander Bublik / Aleksandr Nedovyesov; August Holmgren / Johannes Ingildsen	6^{7} 7^{9}	3; 6
4	(Kazakhstan) (Denmark)	Beibit Zhukayev; Philip Hjorth	3; 6	6; 4	10; 8
5	(Kazakhstan) (Denmark)	Alexander Shevchenko; Elmer Møller				not played

=== Poland vs. South Korea ===
Poland
1
CRS Hall Zielona Góra, Zielona Góra, Poland
13–14 September 2024
Hard (i)

South Korea
3

			1	2	3
1	(Poland) (South Korea)	Maks Kaśnikowski; Hong Seong-chan	6^{8} 7^{10}	2; 6
2	(Poland) (South Korea)	Kamil Majchrzak; Kwon Soon-woo	5; 7	6^{3} 7^{7}
3	(Poland) (South Korea)	Karol Drzewiecki / Jan Zieliński; Chung Yun-seong / Nam Ji-sung	6^{3} 7^{7}	6; 4	3; 6
4	(Poland) (South Korea)	Martyn Pawelski; Song Min-kyu	6; 3	6; 4
5	(Poland) (South Korea)	Maks Kaśnikowski; Kwon Soon-woo				not played

=== Switzerland vs. Peru ===
Switzerland
4
Swiss Tennis Arena, Biel/Bienne, Switzerland
13–14 September 2024
Hard (i)

Peru
0

			1	2	3
1	(Switzerland) (Peru)	Jérôme Kym; Ignacio Buse	6; 1	6; 4
2	(Switzerland) (Peru)	Marc-Andrea Hüsler; Juan Pablo Varillas	6; 3	6; 4
3	(Switzerland) (Peru)	Marc-Andrea Hüsler / Dominic Stricker; Arklon Huertas del Pino / Conner Huertas del Pino	7; 5	6; 1
4	(Switzerland) (Peru)	Rémy Bertola; Gonzalo Bueno	5; 7	7; 5	10; 5
5	(Switzerland) (Peru)	Marc-Andrea Hüsler; Ignacio Buse				not played

=== Egypt vs. Hungary ===
Egypt
2
Gezira Sporting Club, Cairo, Egypt
13–14 September 2024
Clay

Hungary
3

			1	2	3
1	(Egypt) (Hungary)	Amr Elsayed; Zsombor Piros	7; 5	3; 6	4; 6
2	(Egypt) (Hungary)	Mohamed Safwat; Máté Valkusz	6; 3	5; 7	7^{7} 6^{5}
3	(Egypt) (Hungary)	Karim-Mohamed Maamoun / Mohamed Safwat; Péter Fajta / Gergely Madarász	7^{8} 6^{6}	7^{7} 6^{4}
4	(Egypt) (Hungary)	Mohamed Safwat; Zsombor Piros	6^{3} 7^{7}	1; 6
5	(Egypt) (Hungary)	Fares Zakaria; Máté Valkusz	3; 6	4; 6

=== Norway vs. Portugal ===
Norway
3
Nadderud Arena, Bekkestua, Norway
13–14 September 2024
Hard (i)

Portugal
1

			1	2	3
1	(Norway) (Portugal)	Nicolai Budkov Kjær; Jaime Faria	4; 6	6; 3	7^{7} 6^{4}
2	(Norway) (Portugal)	Casper Ruud; Henrique Rocha	3; 6	4; 6
3	(Norway) (Portugal)	Viktor Durasovic / Casper Ruud; Francisco Cabral / Jaime Faria	7; 5	6; 3
4	(Norway) (Portugal)	Casper Ruud; Jaime Faria	7^{7} 6^{3}	6; 2
5	(Norway) (Portugal)	Nicolai Budkov Kjær; Henrique Rocha				not played

=== Austria vs. Turkey ===
Austria
3
Sportaktivpark Bad Waltersdorf, Bad Waltersdorf, Austria
13–14 September 2024
Clay

Turkey
0

			1	2	3
1	(Austria) (Turkey)	Jurij Rodionov; Yanki Erel	6; 3	6; 4
2	(Austria) (Turkey)	Lukas Neumayer; Cem İlkel	7; 6	6; 2
3	(Austria) (Turkey)	Alexander Erler / Lucas Miedler; Altuğ Çelikbilek / Yankı Erel	6; 3	6; 4
4	(Austria) (Turkey)	Jurij Rodionov; Cem İlkel				not played
5	(Austria) (Turkey)	Lukas Neumayer; Yanki Erel				not played

=== Chinese Taipei vs. Bosnia and Herzegovina ===
Chinese Taipei
3
Taipei Tennis Center, Taipei, Chinese Taipei
14–15 September 2024
Hard (i)

Bosnia and Herzegovina
2

			1	2	3
1	(Chinese Taipei) (Bosnia and Herzegovina)	Tseng Chun-hsin; Mirza Bašić	6; 3	5; 7	4; 6
2	(Chinese Taipei) (Bosnia and Herzegovina)	Wu Tung-lin; Damir Džumhur	6; 2	6; 1
3	(Chinese Taipei) (Bosnia and Herzegovina)	Ray Ho / Hsu Yu-hsiou; Mirza Bašić / Nerman Fatić	6; 3	6; 4
4	(Chinese Taipei) (Bosnia and Herzegovina)	Tseng Chun-hsin; Damir Džumhur	4; 6	6; 2	2; 6
5	(Chinese Taipei) (Bosnia and Herzegovina)	Wu Tung-lin; Mirza Bašić	6; 1	6; 4

=== Israel vs. Ukraine ===
Israel
3
Herodotou Tennis Academy, Larnaca, Cyprus
13–14 September 2024
Hard

Ukraine
1

			1	2	3
1	(Israel) (Ukraine)	Yshai Oliel; Oleksandr Ovcharenko	0; 6	6; 4	6; 4
2	(Israel) (Ukraine)	Daniel Cukierman; Vitaliy Sachko	6; 2	6; 2
3	(Israel) (Ukraine)	Daniel Cukierman / Roy Stepanov; Illya Beloborodko / Oleksii Krutykh	5; 7	6^{7} 7^{9}
4	(Israel) (Ukraine)	Yshai Oliel; Oleksii Krutykh	6; 2	3; 6	7^{7} 6^{3}
5	(Israel) (Ukraine)	Daniel Cukierman; Oleksandr Ovcharenko				not played

=== Japan vs. Colombia ===
Japan
3
Ariake Coliseum, Tokyo, Japan
14–15 September 2024
Hard

Colombia
1

			1	2	3
1	(Japan) (Colombia)	Yoshihito Nishioka; Adrià Soriano Barrera	6; 3	6; 4
2	(Japan) (Colombia)	Kei Nishikori; Nicolás Mejía	6; 4	6; 4
3	(Japan) (Colombia)	Shintaro Mochizuki / Yosuke Watanuki; Nicolás Barrientos / Cristian Rodríguez	7^{7} 6^{4}	2; 6	3; 6
4	(Japan) (Colombia)	Yoshihito Nishioka; Nicolás Mejía	7; 5	6; 4
5	(Japan) (Colombia)	Kei Nishikori; Adrià Soriano Barrera				not played
