= 2011 Davis Cup World Group =

- Date: 4 March – 4 December
- Edition: 31st

Champions
- Spain
- Davis Cup

The World Group was the highest level of Davis Cup competition in 2011. The first round losers went into the Davis Cup World Group play-offs and the winners progress to the quarterfinals. The quarterfinalists were guaranteed a World Group spot for 2012. The competition was won by Spain who defeated Argentina in the final.

== Participating teams ==
Participating Teams
Argentina	Austria	Belgium	Chile
Croatia	Czech Republic	France	Germany
India	Kazakhstan	Romania	Russia
Serbia	Spain	Sweden	United States

== Seeds ==
1. Serbia
2. France
3. Spain
4. Czech Republic
5. Argentina
6. United States
7. Russia
8. Croatia

== Draw ==
The draw for the World Group was made in Brussels in September 2010.

First round 4–6 March
Novi Sad, Serbia (indoor hard)
1	Serbia	4
India	1
Borås, Sweden (indoor hard)
7	Russia	2
Sweden	3
Ostrava, Czech Republic (indoor hard)
4	Czech Republic	2
Kazakhstan	3
Buenos Aires, Argentina (clay)
5	Argentina	4
Romania	1
Santiago, Chile (clay)
Chile	1
6	United States	4
Charleroi, Belgium (indoor hard)
Belgium	1
3	Spain	4
Zagreb, Croatia (indoor hard)
Germany	3
8	Croatia	2
Vienna, Austria (indoor clay)
Austria	2
2	France	3

Quarterfinals; 8–10 July
Halmstad, Sweden (indoor hard)
1	Serbia	4
Sweden	1
Buenos Aires, Argentina (clay) 7–9 July
Kazakhstan	0
5	Argentina	5
Austin, United States (indoor hard)
6	United States	1
3	Spain	3
Stuttgart, Germany (clay)
Germany	1
2	France	4

Semifinals; 16–18 September
Belgrade, Serbia (indoor hard)
1	Serbia	2
5	Argentina	3
Córdoba, Spain (clay)
3	Spain	4
2	France	1

Final; 2–4 December
Seville, Spain (indoor clay)
5	Argentina	1
3	Spain	3

== First round ==
=== Serbia vs. India ===
Serbia
4
Spens Sports Center, Novi Sad, Serbia
4–6 March 2011
Hard (i)

India
1

			1	2	3	4	5
1	(Serbia) (India)	Viktor Troicki; Rohan Bopanna	6; 3	6; 3	5; 7	3; 6	6; 3
2	(Serbia) (India)	Janko Tipsarević; Somdev Devvarman	5; 7	5; 7	6^{3} 7^{7}
3	(Serbia) (India)	Ilija Bozoljac / Nenad Zimonjić; Rohan Bopanna / Somdev Devvarman	4; 6	6; 3	6; 4	7^{12} 6^{10}
4	(Serbia) (India)	Viktor Troicki; Somdev Devvarman	6; 4	6; 2	7; 5
5	(Serbia) (India)	Janko Tipsarević; Karan Rastogi	6; 0	6; 1

=== Sweden vs. Russia ===
Sweden
3
Boråshallen, Borås, Sweden
4–6 March 2011
Hard (i)

Russia
2

			1	2	3	4	5
1	(Sweden) (Russia)	Robin Söderling; Igor Andreev	6; 3	6; 3	6; 1
2	(Sweden) (Russia)	Joachim Johansson; Teymuraz Gabashvili	6; 3	7^{7} 6^{4}	6; 4
3	(Sweden) (Russia)	Simon Aspelin / Robert Lindstedt; Igor Kunitsyn / Dmitry Tursunov	6; 4	6^{6} 7^{8}	7^{8} 6^{6}	6; 2
4	(Sweden) (Russia)	Simon Aspelin; Dmitry Tursunov	5; 7	2; 6
5	(Sweden) (Russia)	Joachim Johansson; Igor Andreev	6^{8} 7^{10}	4; 6

=== Czech Republic vs. Kazakhstan ===
Czech Republic
2
ČEZ Aréna, Ostrava, Czech Republic
4–6 March 2011
Hard (i)

Kazakhstan
3

			1	2	3	4	5
1	(Czech Republic) (Kazakhstan)	Jan Hájek; Andrey Golubev	6^{4} 7^{7}	7^{7} 6^{3}	6; 1	6^{4} 7^{7}	3; 6
2	(Czech Republic) (Kazakhstan)	Tomáš Berdych; Mikhail Kukushkin	7^{7} 6^{5}	6; 2	6; 3
3	(Czech Republic) (Kazakhstan)	Tomáš Berdych / Lukáš Dlouhý; Evgeny Korolev / Yuri Schukin	6; 4	6; 4	7^{7} 6^{4}
4	(Czech Republic) (Kazakhstan)	Tomáš Berdych; Andrey Golubev	5; 7	7; 5	4; 6	2; 6
5	(Czech Republic) (Kazakhstan)	Jan Hájek; Mikhail Kukushkin	4; 6	7^{7} 6^{4}	6^{8} 7^{10}	0; 6

=== Argentina vs. Romania ===
Argentina
4
Parque Roca, Buenos Aires, Argentina
4–6 March 2011
Clay

Romania
1

			1	2	3	4	5
1	(Argentina) (Romania)	David Nalbandian; Adrian Ungur	6; 3	6; 2	5; 7	6; 4
2	(Argentina) (Romania)	Juan Mónaco; Victor Hănescu	7^{7} 6^{5}	1; 6	6; 1	6; 1
3	(Argentina) (Romania)	Juan Ignacio Chela / Eduardo Schwank; Victor Hănescu / Horia Tecău	6; 2	7^{10} 6^{8}	6; 1
4	(Argentina) (Romania)	Eduardo Schwank; Victor Crivoi	7^{7} 6^{3}	6; 2
5	(Argentina) (Romania)	Juan Mónaco; Adrian Ungur	4; 6	6; 2	3; 6

=== Chile vs. United States ===
Chile
1
Estadio Nacional, Santiago, Chile
4–6 March 2011
Clay

United States
4

			1	2	3	4	5
1	(Chile) (United States)	Nicolás Massú; Andy Roddick	2; 6	6; 4	3; 6	4; 6
2	(Chile) (United States)	Paul Capdeville; John Isner	6^{5} 7^{7}	6^{2} 7^{7}	7^{7} 6^{3}	7^{7} 6^{5}	6; 4
3	(Chile) (United States)	Jorge Aguilar / Nicolás Massú; Bob Bryan / Mike Bryan	3; 6	3; 6	6^{4} 7^{7}
4	(Chile) (United States)	Paul Capdeville; Andy Roddick	6; 3	6^{2} 7^{7}	3; 6	3; 6
5	(Chile) (United States)	Guillermo Rivera-Aránguiz; John Isner	3; 6	7^{7} 6^{4}	5; 7

=== Belgium vs. Spain ===
Belgium
1
Spiroudome, Charleroi, Belgium
4–6 March 2011
Hard (i)

Spain
4

			1	2	3	4	5
1	(Belgium) (Spain)	Xavier Malisse; Fernando Verdasco	4; 6	3; 6	1; 6
2	(Belgium) (Spain)	Ruben Bemelmans; Rafael Nadal	2; 6	4; 6	2; 6
3	(Belgium) (Spain)	Steve Darcis / Olivier Rochus; Feliciano López / Fernando Verdasco	6^{0} 7^{7}	4; 6	3; 6
4	(Belgium) (Spain)	Olivier Rochus; Rafael Nadal	4; 6	2; 6
5	(Belgium) (Spain)	Steve Darcis; Feliciano López	6^{4} 7^{7}	7^{8} 6^{6}	7^{7} 6^{3}

=== Croatia vs. Germany ===
Croatia
2
Dom Sportova, Zagreb, Croatia
4–6 March 2011
Hard (i)

Germany
3

			1	2	3	4	5
1	(Croatia) (Germany)	Marin Čilić; Florian Mayer	4; 6	6; 0	4; 6	6; 3	6; 1
2	(Croatia) (Germany)	Ivan Dodig; Philipp Kohlschreiber	4; 6	6; 3	6; 4	6^{6} 7^{8}	4; 6
3	(Croatia) (Germany)	Ivan Dodig / Ivo Karlović; Christopher Kas / Philipp Petzschner	3; 6	6; 3	7; 5	3; 6	4; 6
4	(Croatia) (Germany)	Marin Čilić; Philipp Kohlschreiber	6; 2	6; 3	7^{8} 6^{6}
5	(Croatia) (Germany)	Ivo Karlović; Philipp Petzschner	4; 6	6^{3} 7^{7}	6^{5} 7^{7}

=== Austria vs. France ===
Austria
2
Hangar 3, Vienna International Airport, Vienna, Austria
4–6 March 2011
Clay (i)

France
3

			1	2	3	4	5
1	(Austria) (France)	Jürgen Melzer; Jérémy Chardy	5; 7	4; 6	5; 7
2	(Austria) (France)	Stefan Koubek; Gilles Simon	0; 6	2; 6	3; 6
3	(Austria) (France)	Oliver Marach / Jürgen Melzer; Julien Benneteau / Michaël Llodra	6; 4	3; 6	6; 3	6; 4
4	(Austria) (France)	Jürgen Melzer; Gilles Simon	7^{9} 6^{7}	3; 6	1; 6	6; 4	6; 0
5	(Austria) (France)	Martin Fischer; Jérémy Chardy	6; 2	6^{4} 7^{7}	3; 6	3; 6

== Quarterfinals ==
=== Sweden vs. Serbia ===
Sweden
1
Halmstad Arena, Halmstad, Sweden
8–10 July 2011
Hard (i)

Serbia
4

			1	2	3	4	5
1	(Sweden) (Serbia)	Michael Ryderstedt; Viktor Troicki	3; 6	1; 6	7^{8} 6^{6}	5; 7
2	(Sweden) (Serbia)	Ervin Eleskovic; Janko Tipsarević	2; 6	0; 1				retired
3	(Sweden) (Serbia)	Simon Aspelin / Robert Lindstedt; Novak Djokovic / Nenad Zimonjić	6; 4	7^{7} 6^{5}	7; 5
4	(Sweden) (Serbia)	Michael Ryderstedt; Janko Tipsarević	2; 6	5; 7	3; 6
5	(Sweden) (Serbia)	Robert Lindstedt; Viktor Troicki	6; 3	4; 6				retired

=== Argentina vs. Kazakhstan ===
Argentina
5
Parque Roca, Buenos Aires, Argentina
7–9 July 2011
Clay

Kazakhstan
0

			1	2	3	4	5
1	(Argentina) (Kazakhstan)	Juan Mónaco; Andrey Golubev	6; 3	6; 0	6; 4
2	(Argentina) (Kazakhstan)	Juan Martín del Potro; Mikhail Kukushkin	6; 2	6; 1	6; 2
3	(Argentina) (Kazakhstan)	Juan Ignacio Chela / Eduardo Schwank; Evgeny Korolev / Yuri Schukin	6; 3	6; 2	7; 5
4	(Argentina) (Kazakhstan)	Juan Ignacio Chela; Evgeny Korolev	2; 6	6; 2	6; 0
5	(Argentina) (Kazakhstan)	Juan Mónaco; Mikhail Kukushkin	6; 4	6; 1

=== United States vs. Spain ===
United States
1
Frank Erwin Center, Austin, United States
8–10 July 2011
Hard (i)

Spain
3

			1	2	3	4	5
1	(United States) (Spain)	Mardy Fish; Feliciano López	4; 6	6; 3	3; 6	7^{7} 6^{2}	6; 8
2	(United States) (Spain)	Andy Roddick; David Ferrer	6^{9} 7^{11}	5; 7	3; 6
3	(United States) (Spain)	Bob Bryan / Mike Bryan; Marcel Granollers / Fernando Verdasco	6^{3} 7^{7}	6; 4	6; 4	6; 4
4	(United States) (Spain)	Mardy Fish; David Ferrer	5; 7	6^{3} 7^{7}	7; 5	6^{5} 7^{7}
5	(United States) (Spain)	Andy Roddick; Feliciano López						not played

=== Germany vs. France ===
Germany
1
TC Weissenhof, Stuttgart, Germany
8–10 July 2011
Clay

France
4

			1	2	3	4	5
1	(Germany) (France)	Florian Mayer; Richard Gasquet	6; 4	6; 4	5; 7	3; 6	3; 6
2	(Germany) (France)	Philipp Kohlschreiber; Gaël Monfils	6^{3} 7^{7}	6^{5} 7^{7}	4; 6
3	(Germany) (France)	Christopher Kas / Philipp Petzschner; Michaël Llodra / Jo-Wilfried Tsonga	6^{4} 7^{7}	4; 6	4; 6
4	(Germany) (France)	Philipp Petzschner; Michaël Llodra	6; 3	6; 4
5	(Germany) (France)	Philipp Kohlschreiber; Jo-Wilfried Tsonga	6^{3} 7^{7}	6^{5} 7^{7}

== Semifinals ==
=== Serbia vs. Argentina ===
Serbia
2
Belgrade Arena, Belgrade, Serbia
16–18 September 2011
Hard (i)

Argentina
3

			1	2	3	4	5
1	(Serbia) (Argentina)	Viktor Troicki; David Nalbandian	4; 6	6; 4	2; 6	3; 6
2	(Serbia) (Argentina)	Janko Tipsarević; Juan Martín del Potro	5; 7	3; 6	4; 6
3	(Serbia) (Argentina)	Nenad Zimonjić / Viktor Troicki; Juan Ignacio Chela / Juan Mónaco	7^{7} 6^{4}	6; 4	6; 2
4	(Serbia) (Argentina)	Novak Djokovic; Juan Martín del Potro	6^{5} 7^{7}	0; 3				retired
5	(Serbia) (Argentina)	Janko Tipsarević; Juan Mónaco	6; 2					retired

=== Spain vs. France ===
Spain
4
Plaza de Toros de los Califas, Córdoba, Spain
16–18 September 2011
Clay

France
1

			1	2	3	4	5
1	(Spain) (France)	Rafael Nadal; Richard Gasquet	6; 3	6; 0	6; 1
2	(Spain) (France)	David Ferrer; Gilles Simon	6; 1	6; 4	6; 1
3	(Spain) (France)	Feliciano López / Fernando Verdasco; Michaël Llodra / Jo-Wilfried Tsonga	1; 6	2; 6	0; 6
4	(Spain) (France)	Rafael Nadal; Jo-Wilfried Tsonga	6; 0	6; 2	6; 4
5	(Spain) (France)	Fernando Verdasco; Richard Gasquet	6; 2	6; 1

== Final ==
=== Spain vs. Argentina ===
Spain
3
Estadio Olímpico, Seville, Spain
2–4 December 2011
Clay (i)

Argentina
1

			1	2	3	4	5
1	(Spain) (Argentina)	Rafael Nadal; Juan Mónaco	6; 1	6; 1	6; 2
2	(Spain) (Argentina)	David Ferrer; Juan Martín del Potro	6; 2	6^{2} 7^{7}	3; 6	6; 4	6; 3
3	(Spain) (Argentina)	Feliciano López / Fernando Verdasco; David Nalbandian / Eduardo Schwank	4; 6	2; 6	3; 6
4	(Spain) (Argentina)	Rafael Nadal; Juan Martín del Potro	1; 6	6; 4	6; 1	7^{7} 6^{0}
5	(Spain) (Argentina)	David Ferrer; Juan Mónaco						not played
