= Serbia ATP Cup team =

Serbia
- First year: 2020
- Years played: 3
- Ties played (W–L): 11 (8–3)
- Titles: 1 (2020)
- Most total wins: Novak Djokovic (11–1)
- Most singles wins: Novak Djokovic (8–0)
- Most doubles wins: Nikola Ćaćić (5–3)
- Best doubles team: Ćaćić / Troicki (3–1)
- Most ties played: Dušan Lajović (11)
- Most years played: Dušan Lajović & Nikola Ćaćić (3)

The Serbia ATP Cup team represented Serbia in the ATP Cup tennis competition and competed in all three editions of the tournament during its existence. In 2020, Serbia won the inaugural ATP Cup.

The ATP Cup was an international men's team tennis tournament played on outdoor hard courts from 2020 to 2022. Held across one to three cities in Australia over a ten-day period leading up to the Australian Open, the tournament featured teams from 12, 16, or 24 countries.

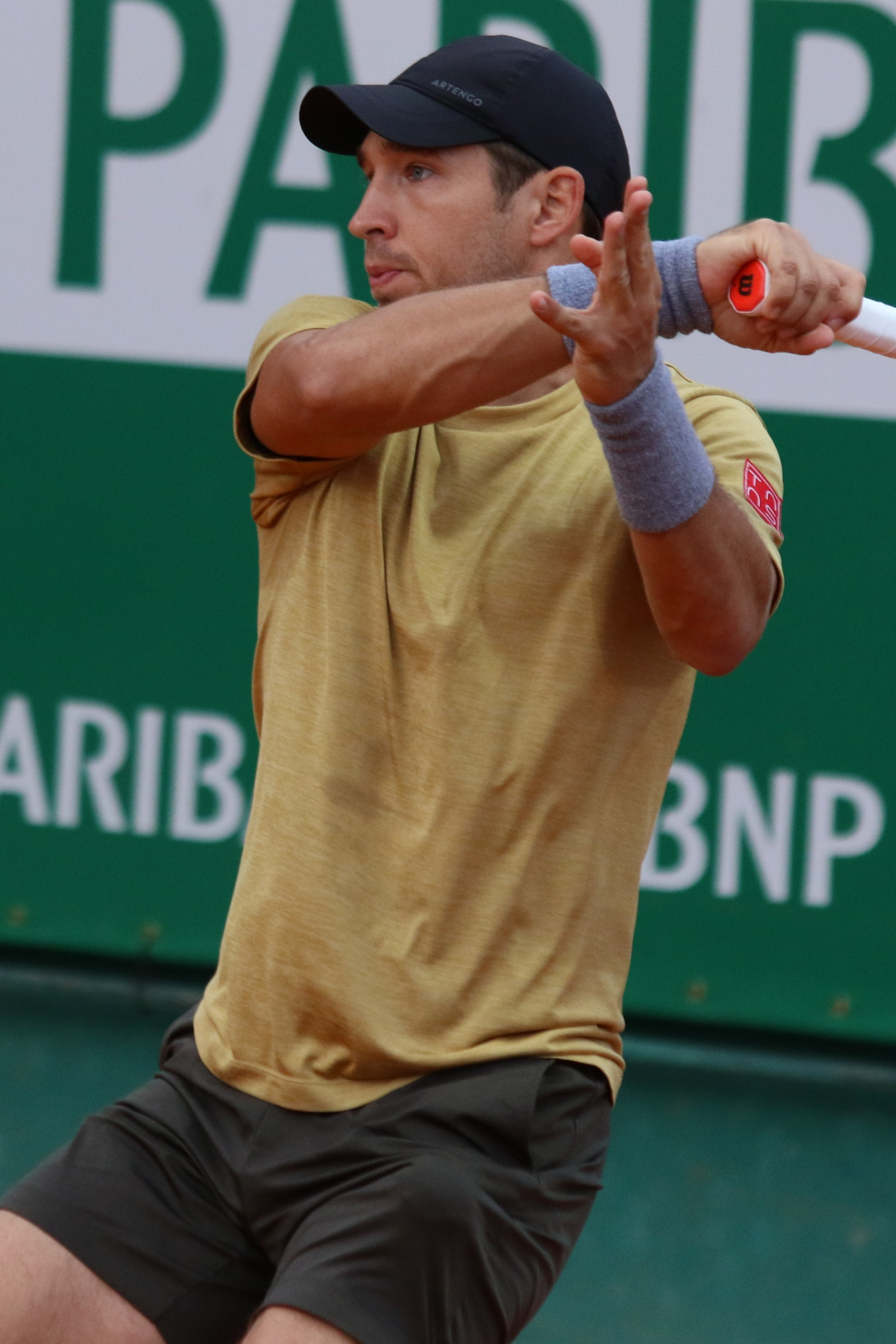
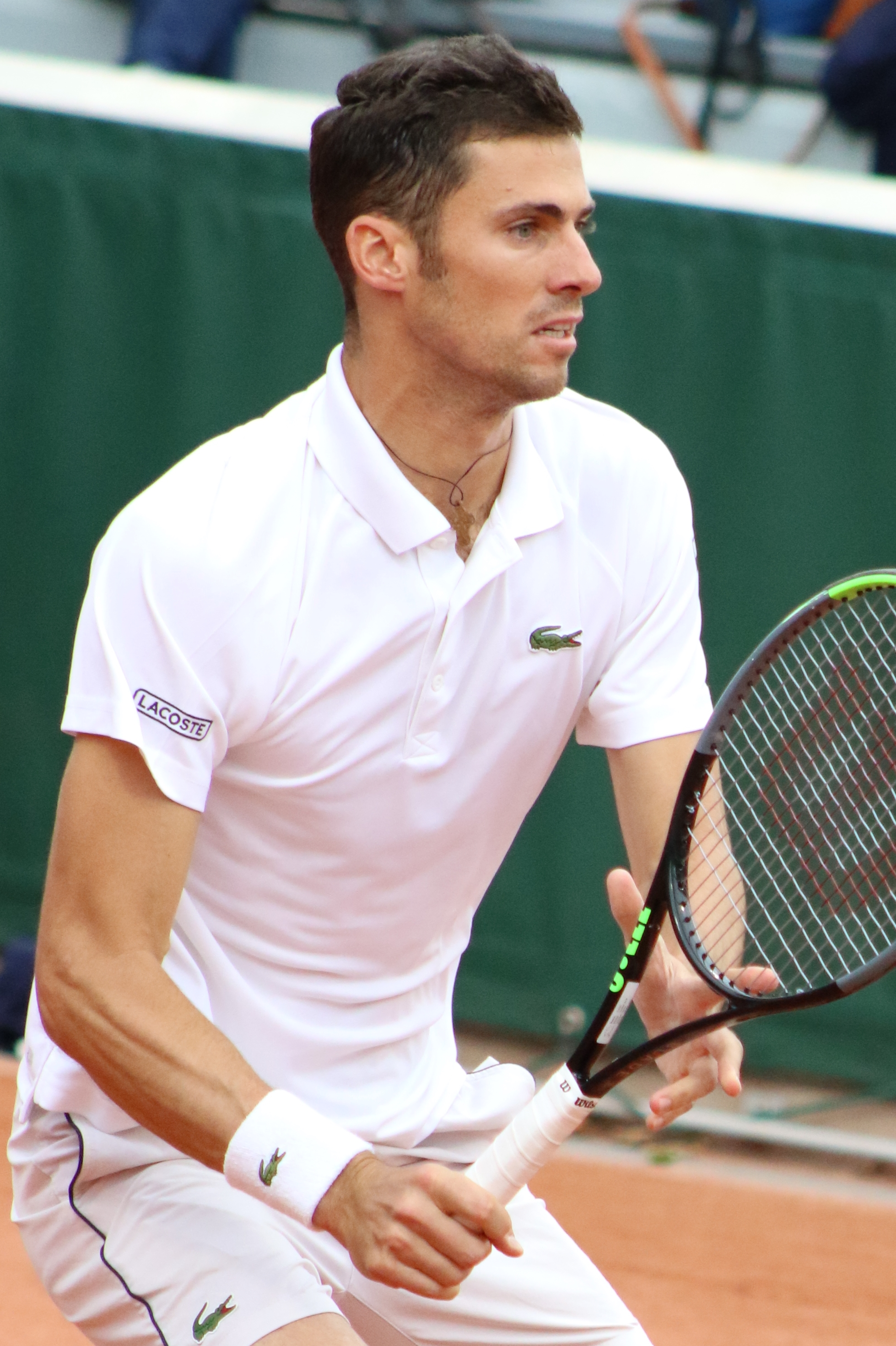
Dušan Lajović and Nikola Ćaćić competed in all three editions of the ATP Cup during its existence, winning the inaugural tournament.

== Players ==
This is a list of players who represented Serbia in the ATP Cup.

Player	No. of ties	Total Win/Loss	Singles Win/Loss	Doubles Win/Loss	Tenure
Dušan Lajović	11	4–7	4–7	—	3
Nikola Ćaćić	8	5–3	—	5–3	3
Novak Djokovic	8	11–1	8–0	3–1	2
Filip Krajinović	4	4–1	2–1	2–0	2
Viktor Troicki	6	5–1	—	5–1	1
Matej Sabanov	2	1–1	—	1–1	1
Nikola Milojević	0	0–0	—	—	1

Team rosters by year

- 2020: Novak Djokovic – Dušan Lajović – Viktor Troicki – Nikola Ćaćić – Nikola Milojević (DNP)
- 2021: Novak Djokovic – Dušan Lajović – Filip Krajinović – Nikola Ćaćić
- 2022: Dušan Lajović – Filip Krajinović – Nikola Ćaćić – Matej Sabanov

== Results ==
Year	Competition	Date	Surface	Location	Opponent	Score	Result
2020	ATP Cup Group stage	4 Jan	hard	Brisbane, Australia	South Africa	3 : 0	Won
2020	ATP Cup Group stage	6 Jan	hard	Brisbane, Australia	France	2 : 1	Won
2020	ATP Cup Group stage	8 Jan	hard	Brisbane, Australia	Chile	2 : 1	Won
2020	ATP Cup Quarter-finals	10 Jan	hard	Sydney, Australia	Canada	3 : 0	Won
2020	ATP Cup Semi-finals	11 Jan	hard	Sydney, Australia	Russia	3 : 0	Won
2020	ATP Cup Final	12 Jan	hard	Sydney, Australia	Spain	2 : 1	Champions
2021	ATP Cup Group stage	2 Feb	hard	Melbourne, Australia	Canada	2 : 1	Won
2021	ATP Cup Group stage	5 Feb	hard	Melbourne, Australia	Germany	1 : 2	Lost
2022	ATP Cup Group stage	1 Jan	hard	Sydney, Australia	Norway	2 : 1	Won
2022	ATP Cup Group stage	3 Jan	hard	Sydney, Australia	Chile	1 : 2	Lost
2022	ATP Cup Group stage	5 Jan	hard	Sydney, Australia	Spain	1 : 2	Lost

== Head to head ==
(by No. of ties)

- vs Canada 2 ties 2–0
- vs Spain 2 ties 1–1
- vs Chile 2 ties 1–1
- vs South Africa 1 tie 1–0
- vs France 1 tie 1–0
- vs Russia 1 tie 1–0
- vs Norway 1 tie 1–0
- vs Germany 1 tie 0–1

== Captains ==
Denotes captains who won the ATP Cup title

Name	Residence	Tenure
(Serbia) Nenad Zimonjić	Beograd	2020
(Serbia) Viktor Troicki	Beograd	2021
(Serbia) Ivan Sabanov	Palić	2022

== See also ==
- Serbia Davis Cup team
- Serbia at the Hopman Cup
- Serbia Billie Jean King Cup team
