= Serbia Davis Cup team =

Davis Cup team representing Serbia

Serbia
- Association: Tennis Federation of Serbia
- Captain: Viktor Troicki
- Nations Ranking: 23 (▼1) (21 September 2026)
- Highest ranking: 2 (6 December 2010)
- Colors: Red and white
- First year: 1927
- Years played: 91
- Ties played (W–L): 213 (125–88)
- Years in World Group: 27 (35–28)
- Davis Cup titles: 1 (2010)
- Runners-up: 1 (2013)
- Most total wins: Novak Djokovic (46–16)
- Most singles wins: Novak Djokovic (41–8)
- Most doubles wins: Nenad Zimonjić (30–19)
- Best doubles team: Vemić / Zimonjić (7–2)
- Most ties played: Nenad Zimonjić (55)
- Most years played: Nenad Zimonjić (22)
- Last updated on: 20 September 2026.

The Serbian men's national tennis team represents Serbia in the Davis Cup and the United Cup, both tennis competitions. Serbia has occasionally competed in the Hopman Cup and has previously participated in prestigious tournaments, including the now-defunct World Team Cup and ATP Cup, where they claimed the titles.

Serbia, as the legal successor, has inherited all the results from the former Yugoslavia and Serbia and Montenegro. Since June 2006, the team has played under the name of Serbia, following the split of Serbia and Montenegro.

Serbia won the Davis Cup title for the first and only time in 2010, defeating France with 3:2 in the final as host nation. The team was a runner-up in 2013, when they were defeated by the Czech Republic with 2:3 in the final in Belgrade. The team also had four semifinals Davis Cup appearances (in 2011, 2017, 2021, 2023) and four quarterfinals Davis Cup appearances (in 2012, 2015, 2016, 2019).

== Current team ==
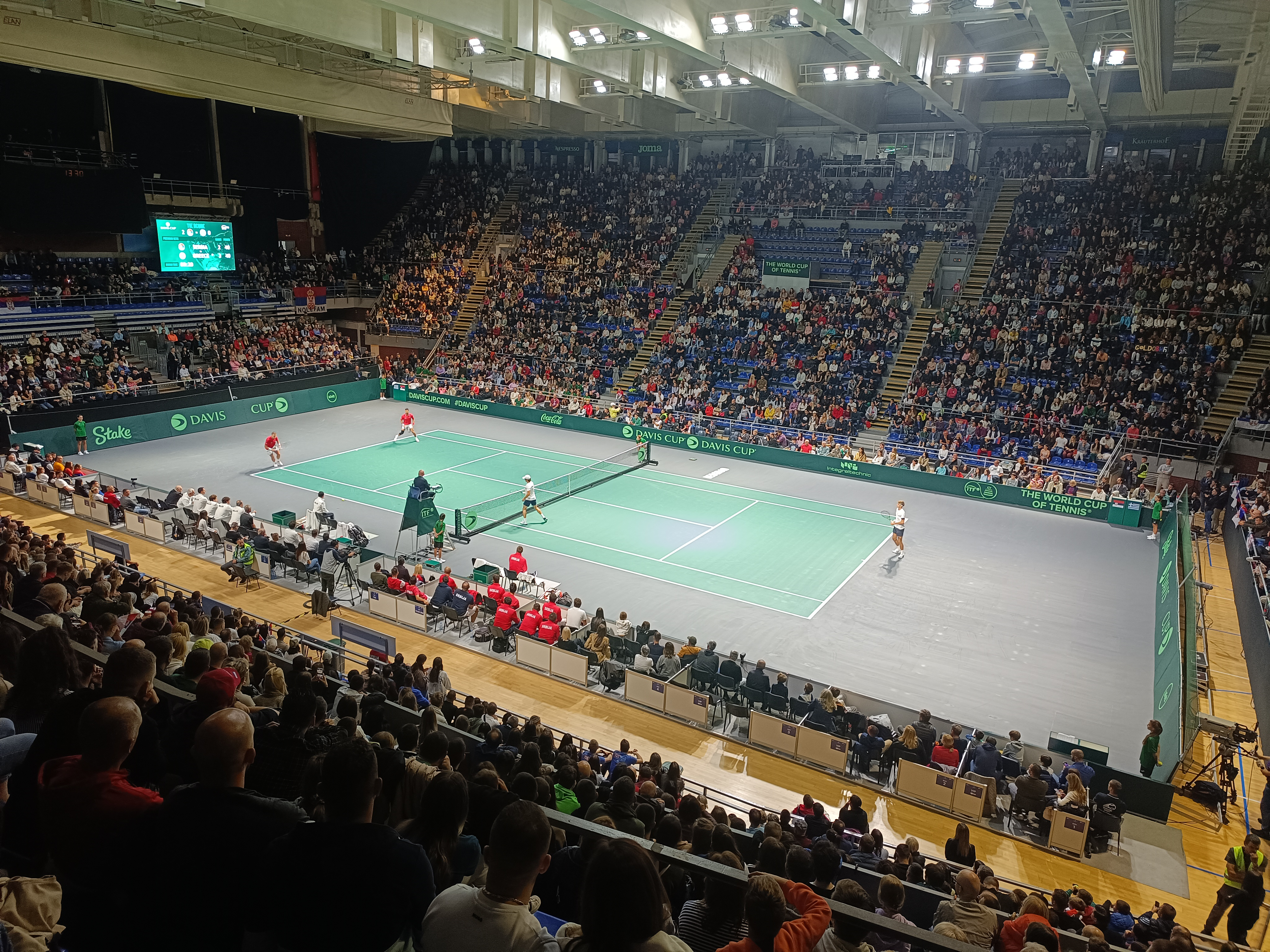
Djoković and Međedović facing Thanos and Tsitsipas during the doubles match between Serbia and the Greece in September 2024

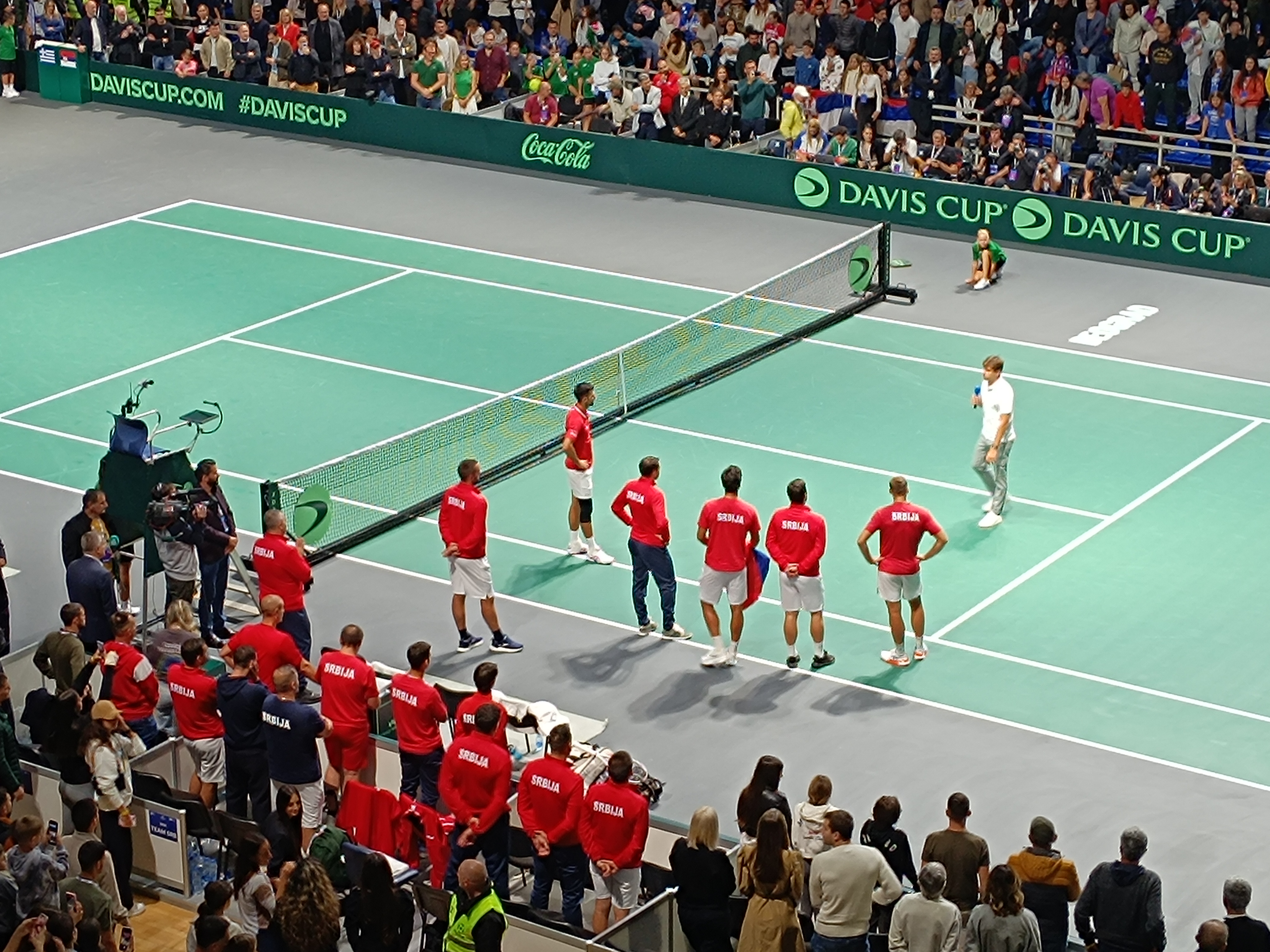
Krajinović during his retirement speech following the match between Serbia and Greece in September 2024

The following players were called up for the 2026 Davis Cup World Group I tie against Lithuania.

Player	Singles Rank	Doubles Rank	First year played	No. of ties	Total Win/Loss	Singles Win/Loss	Doubles Win/Loss
Miomir Kecmanović	61	896	2021	14	12–8	8–5	4–3
Hamad Medjedovic	77	—	2023	5	5–2	4–1	1–1
Ognjen Milić	356	2001	2026	2	1–1	1–1	0–0
Branko Djuric	504	1980	2025	2	0–2	0–2	0–0
Stefan Latinović	1330	90	2026	1	1–0	0–0	1–0

ATP rankings on 14 September 2026

=== Recent call-ups ===
The following players were part of a team in the last five years and played in at least one tie.

Player	Singles Rank	Doubles Rank	First year played	No. of ties	Total Win/Loss	Singles Win/Loss	Doubles Win/Loss	Last year played
Dušan Lajović	149	—	2012	21	13–14	13–13	0–1	2026
Ivan Sabanov	—	238	2025	2	1–1	0–0	1–1	2026
Matej Sabanov	—	242	2025	2	1–1	0–0	1–1	2026
Novak Djokovic	12	571	2004	37	46–16	41–8	5–8	2024
Laslo Djere	183	—	2017	10	5–5	5–5	0–0	2024
Nikola Ćaćić	Retired		2021	10	5–5	0–0	5–5	2024
Filip Krajinović	Retired		2014	16	11–9	8–4	3–5	2023

ATP rankings on 14 September 2026

== History ==
Serbia competed in its first Davis Cup as an independent nation in 2007.

Within the Yugoslav Davis Cup team, they reached the semifinals of the World Group in 1988, 1989 and 1991.

They competed as the Serbia and Montenegro Davis Cup team from 2003–2006.

Serbia won the Davis Cup title in 2010.

Year	Name of the country [Ties & results]	Years played	Ties played	Years in World Group	Best result
1900–1926	Doesn't compete				
1927–1928	Kingdom of Serbs, Croats and Slovenes (KSHS): 1927 vs India 0:3 / 1928 vs Finland 1:4	2	2 (0–2)	—	Europe Zone 2nd round 1927
1929–1939	Kingdom of Yugoslavia: 1929 vs Greece 1:4; 1930 vs Sweden 5:0; 1930 vs Spain 0:5; 1931 vs Japan 0:5; 1932 vs Denmark 1:4; 1933 vs Italy 1:4; 1933 vs Norway 5:0; 1933 vs Austria 1:4; 1934 vs Spain w/o (Note: Due to increased political tensions in Europe, entries for the Europe Zone declined sharply, causing the qualifying round system to be scrapped.); 1934 vs Hungary 3:2; 1935 vs Czechoslovakia 1:4; 1936 vs Czechoslovakia 3:2; 1936 vs France 3:2; 1936 vs Austria 4:1; 1936 vs Germany 0:3 / 1937 vs Romania 5:0; 1937 vs South Africa 4:1; 1937 vs Czechoslovakia 1:4; 1938 vs Czechoslovakia 3:2; 1938 vs Great Britain 5:0; 1938 vs Sweden 3:1; 1938 vs Belgium 5:0; 1938 vs Germany 2:3; 1939 vs Ireland 5:0; 1939 vs Hungary 4:1; 1939 vs Italy 3:2; 1939 vs Belgium 3:2; 1939 vs Germany 3:2; 1939 vs Australia 1:4	11	28 (17–11)	—	Inter–Zonal Zone 1939
1940–1945	World War II				
1946–1962	(Socialist Federal Republic of Yugoslavia) Federal People's Republic of Yugoslavia (FNRJ): 1946 vs Egypt 5:0; 1946 vs Czechoslovakia 3:2; 1946 vs France 3:2; 1946 vs Sweden 2:3; 1947 vs Ireland 3:2; 1947 vs Belgium 4:1; 1947 vs South Africa 3:2; 1947 vs Czechoslovakia 0:4; 1948 vs Turkey 5:0; 1948 vs Italy 2:3; 1949 vs Austria 4:1; 1949 vs Sweden 3:2; 1949 vs Italy 1:4; 1950 vs Austria 5:0; 1950 vs Belgium 2:3; 1951 vs Germany 2:3 / 1952 vs Finland 3:2; 1952 vs Great Britain 2:3; 1953 vs Switzerland 5:0; 1953 vs France 1:4; 1954 vs Monaco 4:1; 1954 vs Belgium 0:5; 1955 vs Chile 0:5; 1956 vs Egypt 4:1; 1956 vs Great Britain 0:5; 1957 vs Mexico 0:5; 1958 vs Czechoslovakia 0:5; 1959 vs Denmark 1:4; 1960 vs Denmark 2:3; 1961 vs Spain 1:3; 1962 vs (West Indies Federation) Caribbean/West Indies 4:1; 1962 vs Mexico 1:4	17	32 (15–17)	—	Europe Zone Final 1947; Americas Zone Final 1962
1963–1992	Socialist Federal Republic of Yugoslavia (SFRJ): 1963 vs Monaco 5:0; 1963 vs Austria 5:0; 1963 vs Sweden 1:4; 1964 vs Luxembourg 3:0; 1964 vs Argentina 5:0; 1964 vs Great Britain 2:3; 1965 vs Morocco 5:0; 1965 vs Rhodesia 5:0; 1965 vs France 0:5; 1966 vs Spain 1:4; 1967 vs Brazil 2:3; 1968 vs New Zealand 4:0; 1968 vs Soviet Union 0:5; 1969 vs France 3:2; 1969 vs Spain 0:5; 1970 vs Poland 3:2; 1970 vs Ireland 5:0; 1970 vs Romania 3:2; 1970 vs Spain 1:4; 1971 vs Great Britain 3:0; 1971 vs Italy 3:2; 1971 vs Romania 1:4; 1972 vs Poland 1:3; 1973 vs New Zealand 2:3; 1974 vs Belgium 3:2; 1974 vs Egypt 3:2; 1974 vs Soviet Union 1:3; 1975 vs Bulgaria 4:1; 1975 vs France 0:3; 1976 vs Greece 5:0; 1976 vs Italy 0:5; 1977 vs Netherlands 5:0; 1977 vs Spain 1:4 / 1978 vs Morocco 5:0; 1978 vs Sweden 2:3; 1979 vs Switzerland 1:4; 1979 vs Portugal 5:0; 1980 vs Romania 0:5; 1981 vs Israel 1:4; 1982 vs Norway 5:0; 1982 vs Hungary 2:3; 1983 vs Tunisia 3:0; 1983 vs Spain 3:2; 1983 vs Bulgaria 5:0; 1983 vs Hungary 4:0; 1984 vs Australia 0:5; 1984 vs Great Britain 4:1; 1985 vs Australia 2:3; 1985 vs France 4:1; 1986 vs Soviet Union 3:2; 1986 vs Czechoslovakia 0:5; 1987 vs Australia 1:4; 1987 vs Great Britain 3:0; 1988 vs India 3:2; 1988 vs Italy 4:1; 1988 vs West Germany 0:5; 1989 vs Denmark 4:1; 1989 vs Spain 4:1; 1989 vs Sweden 1:4; 1990 vs New Zealand 2:3; 1990 vs Switzerland 3:2; 1991 vs Sweden 4:1; 1991 vs Czechoslovakia 4:1; 1991 vs France 0:5; 1992 vs Australia 0:5; 1992 vs Cuba w/o (Note: In response to the Yugoslav Wars and following the adoption of UN SCR 757 in May 1992, Yugoslavia was barred from competing in international sporting competition. This resulted in the Yugoslav team being disqualified from this and future Davis Cups and their Qualifying Round tie against Cuba was defaulted.)	30	65 (36–29)	9 (7–9)	World Group semifinals 1988, 1989, 1991
1993–1994	UN sport sanctions				
1995–2003	Federal Republic of Yugoslavia (SRJ): 1995 vs Benin 3:0; 1995 vs Greece 2:1; 1995 vs San Marino 3:0; 1995 vs Moldova 3:0; 1995 vs Togo 3:0; 1996 vs Slovakia 1:4; 1996 vs Algeria 5:0; 1997 vs Lithuania 3:2; 1997 vs Portugal 2:3; 1998 vs Latvia 3:2; 1998 vs Portugal 2:3; 1999 vs Morocco 1:4; 1999 vs Turkey 2:3 / 2000 vs Monaco 3:0; 2000 vs Botswana 3:0; 2000 vs Tunisia 2:0; 2000 vs Georgia 3:0; 2000 vs Monaco 3:0; 2001 vs South Africa 0:5; 2001 vs Poland 3:2; 2002 vs South Africa 3:2; 2002 vs Luxembourg 2:3	9	25 (17–8)	0	Europe/Africa Zone group II play–offs 2003
2003–2006	Serbia and Montenegro (SCG): 2003 vs Ivory Coast 4:1; 2003 vs Bulgaria 4:1; 2003 vs Greece 2:3; 2004 vs Latvia 5:0; 2004 vs Portugal 5:0; 2004 vs Hungary 3:0; 2005 vs Zimbabwe 5:0 / 2005 vs Belgium 2:3; 2006 vs Israel 4:1; 2006 vs Great Britain 3:2; 2006 vs Switzerland 1:4	3	8 (6–2)	0	World Group play–offs 2006
2007–	Serbia (SRB): 2007 vs Georgia 5:0; 2007 vs Australia 4:1; 2008 vs Russia 2:3; 2008 vs Slovakia 4:1; 2009 vs Spain 1:4; 2009 vs Uzbekistan 5:0; 2010 vs United States 3:2; 2010 vs Croatia 4:1; 2010 vs Czech Republic 3:2; 2010 vs France 3:2; 2011 vs India 4:1; 2011 vs Sweden 4:1; 2011 vs Argentina 2:3; 2012 vs Sweden 4:1; 2012 vs Czech Republic 1:4; 2013 vs Belgium 3:2; 2013 vs United States 3:1; 2013 vs Canada 3:2; 2013 vs Czech Republic 2:3; 2014 vs Switzerland 2:3; 2014 vs India 3:2; 2015 vs Croatia 5:0; 2015 vs Argentina 1:4; 2016 vs Kazakhstan 3:2; 2016 vs Great Britain 2:3; 2017 vs Russia 4:0 / 2017 vs Spain 4:1; 2017 vs France 1:3; 2018 vs United States 1:3; 2018 vs India 4:1; 2019 vs Uzbekistan 3:2; 2019 vs Japan 3:0; 2019 vs France 2:1; 2019 vs Russia 1:2; 2021 vs Austria 3:0; 2021 vs Germany 1:2; 2021 vs Kazakhstan 2:1; 2021 vs Croatia 1:2; 2022 vs Spain 0:3; 2022 vs South Korea 2:1; 2022 vs Canada 2:1; 2023 vs Norway 4:0; 2023 vs South Korea 3:0; 2023 vs Spain 3:0; 2023 vs Czech Republic 0:3; 2023 vs Great Britain 2:0; 2023 vs Italy 1:2; 2024 vs Slovakia 0:4; 2024 vs Greece 3:1; 2025 vs Denmark 2:3; 2025 vs Turkey 3:1; 2026 vs Chile 0:4; 2026 vs Lithuania 4:0	19	53 (34–19)	18 (28–19)	Winner 2010

1927–	Overall	91	213 (125–88)	27 (35–28)	Winner 2010

Serbia is considered as the direct successor of former Davis Cup teams (SCG, YUG), which is important in drawing decisions of home/away ties and choice of ground.

== Results under present name Serbia ==
=== 2000s ===
Year	Competition	Date	Surface	Location	Opponent	Score	Result
2007	Europe/Africa Zone group I 1st round	9–11 Feb	bye				
2007	Europe/Africa Zone group I 2nd round	6–8 Apr	clay	Kovilovo, Serbia	Georgia	5 : 0	Won
2007	World Group play-offs	21–23 Sep	clay	Belgrade, Serbia	Australia	4 : 1	Won
2008	World Group 1st round	8–10 Feb	hard	Moscow, Russia	Russia	2 : 3	Lost
2008	World Group play-offs	19–21 Sep	hard	Bratislava, Slovakia	Slovakia	4 : 1	Won
2009	World Group 1st round	7–8 Mar	clay	Benidorm, Spain	Spain	1 : 4	Lost
2009	World Group play-offs	18–20 Sep	hard	Belgrade, Serbia	Uzbekistan	5 : 0	Won

=== 2010s ===
Year	Competition	Date	Surface	Location	Opponent	Score	Result
2010	World Group 1st round	5–7 Mar	clay	Belgrade, Serbia	United States	3 : 2	Won
2010	World Group quarterfinals	9–11 Jul	hard	Split, Croatia	Croatia	4 : 1	Won
2010	World Group semifinals	17–19 Sep	hard	Belgrade, Serbia	Czech Republic	3 : 2	Won
2010	World Group final	3–5 Dec	hard	Belgrade, Serbia	France	3 : 2	Champion
2011	World Group 1st round	4–6 Mar	hard	Novi Sad, Serbia	India	4 : 1	Won
2011	World Group quarterfinals	8–10 Jul	hard	Halmstad, Sweden	Sweden	4 : 1	Won
2011	World Group semifinals	16–18 Sep	hard	Belgrade, Serbia	Argentina	2 : 3	Lost
2012	World Group 1st round	10–12 Feb	hard	Niš, Serbia	Sweden	4 : 1	Won
2012	World Group quarterfinals	6–8 Apr	clay	Prague, Czech Rep.	Czech Republic	1 : 4	Lost
2013	World Group 1st round	1–3 Feb	clay	Charleroi, Belgium	Belgium	3 : 2	Won
2013	World Group quarterfinals	5–7 Apr	hard	Boise, United States	United States	3 : 1	Won
2013	World Group semifinals	13–15 Sep	clay	Belgrade, Serbia	Canada	3 : 2	Won
2013	World Group final	15–17 Nov	hard	Belgrade, Serbia	Czech Republic	2 : 3	Runner-up
2014	World Group 1st round	31 Jan–2 Feb	hard	Novi Sad, Serbia	Switzerland	2 : 3	Lost
2014	World Group play-offs	12–15 Sep	hard	Bangalore, India	India	3 : 2	Won
2015	World Group 1st round	6–8 Mar	hard	Kraljevo, Serbia	Croatia	5 : 0	Won
2015	World Group quarterfinals	17–19 Jul	clay	Buenos Aires, Argentina	Argentina	1 : 4	Lost
2016	World Group 1st round	4–6 Mar	hard	Belgrade, Serbia	Kazakhstan	3 : 2	Won
2016	World Group quarterfinals	15–17 Jul	clay	Belgrade, Serbia	Great Britain	2 : 3	Lost
2017	World Group 1st round	3–5 Feb	hard	Niš, Serbia	Russia	4 : 0	Won
2017	World Group quarterfinals	7–9 Apr	hard	Belgrade, Serbia	Spain	4 : 1	Won
2017	World Group semifinals	15–17 Sep	clay	Lille, France	France	1 : 3	Lost
2018	World Group 1st round	2–4 Feb	clay	Niš, Serbia	United States	1 : 3	Lost
2018	World Group play-offs	14–16 Sep	clay	Kraljevo, Serbia	India	4 : 1	Won
2019	World Group qualifying round	1–2 Feb	hard	Tashkent, Uzbekistan	Uzbekistan	3 : 2	Won
2019	World Group finals group A	20 Nov	hard	Madrid, Spain	Japan	3 : 0	Won
2019	World Group finals group A	21 Nov	hard	Madrid, Spain	France	2 : 1	Won
2019	World Group finals quarterfinals	22 Nov	hard	Madrid, Spain	Russia	1 : 2	Lost

=== 2020s ===
Year	Competition	Date	Surface	Location	Opponent	Score	Result
2020–21	World Group finals group stage	26 Nov	hard	Innsbruck, Austria	Austria	3 : 0	Won
2020–21	World Group finals group stage	27 Nov	hard	Innsbruck, Austria	Germany	1 : 2	Lost
2020–21	World Group finals quarterfinals	1 Dec	hard	Madrid, Spain	Kazakhstan	2 : 1	Won
2020–21	World Group finals semifinals	3 Dec	hard	Madrid, Spain	Croatia	1 : 2	Lost
2022	World Group finals group stage	14 Sep	hard	Valencia, Spain	Spain	0 : 3	Lost
2022	World Group finals group stage	15 Sep	hard	Valencia, Spain	South Korea	2 : 1	Won
2022	World Group finals group stage	17 Sep	hard	Valencia, Spain	Canada	2 : 1	Won
2023	World Group qualifying round	3–5 Feb	hard	Oslo, Norway	Norway	4 : 0	Won
2023	World Group group stage	12 Sep	hard	Valencia, Spain	South Korea	3 : 0	Won
2023	World Group group stage	15 Sep	hard	Valencia, Spain	Spain	3 : 0	Won
2023	World Group group stage	16 Sep	hard	Valencia, Spain	Czech Republic	0 : 3	Lost
2023	World Group quarterfinals	23 Nov	hard	Málaga, Spain	Great Britain	2 : 0	Won
2023	World Group semifinals	25 Nov	hard	Málaga, Spain	Italy	1 : 2	Lost
2024	World Group qualifying round	2–3 Feb	clay	Kraljevo, Serbia	Slovakia	0 : 4	Lost
2024	World Group I	14–15 Sep	hard	Belgrade, Serbia	Greece	3 : 1	Won
2025	Qualifiers, First Round	31 Jan–1 Feb	hard	Copenhagen, Denmark	Denmark	2 : 3	Lost
2025	World Group I	12–13 Sep	hard	Niš, Serbia	Turkey	3 : 1	Won
2026	Qualifiers, First Round	6–7 Feb	clay	Santiago, Chile	Chile	0 : 4	Lost
2026	World Group I	18–20 Sep	hard (i)	Niš, Serbia	Lithuania	4 : 0	Won

== Davis Cup finals ==
Edition	Rounds/Opponents	Results
2010	1R: United States QF: Croatia SF: Czech Republic F: France	1R: 3–2 QF: 4–1 SF: 3–2 F: 3–2
2013	1R: Belgium QF: United States SF: Canada F: Czech Republic	1R: 3–2 QF: 3–1 SF: 3–2 F: 2–3

== Statistics ==
Lists are correct as of 20 September 2026, following the tie against Lithuania.

=== Head-to-head record ===
(by No. of ties)

- vs (Czech Republic) Czechoslovakia/Czech Rep. 13 ties 5–8
- vs Spain 12 ties 4–8
- vs France 11 ties 6–5
- vs Great Britain 10 ties 6–4
- vs Sweden 10 ties 6–4
- vs Belgium 8 ties 5–3
- vs Italy 8 ties 3–5
- vs Austria 6 ties 5–1
- vs / Soviet Union/Russia 6 ties 2–4
- vs Australia 6 ties 1–5
- vs Germany/West Germany 6 ties 1–5
- vs Denmark 5 ties 1–4
- vs Greece 5 ties 3–2
- vs Hungary 5 ties 4–1
- vs India 5 ties 4–1
- vs Switzerland 5 ties 2–3
- vs Monaco 4 ties 4–0
- vs South Africa 4 ties 3–1
- vs Portugal 4 ties 2–2
- vs Romania 4 ties 2–2
- vs Bulgaria 3 ties 3–0
- vs Egypt 3 ties 3–0
- vs Ireland 3 ties 3–0
- vs Norway 3 ties 3–0
- vs Croatia 3 ties 2–1
- vs Morocco 3 ties 2–1
- vs Poland 3 ties 2–1
- vs Slovakia 3 ties 1–2
- vs United States 3 ties 2–1
- vs Argentina 3 ties 1–2
- vs New Zealand 3 ties 1–2
- vs Turkey 3 ties 2–1
- vs Canada 2 ties 2–0
- vs Georgia 2 ties 2–0
- vs Kazakhstan 2 ties 2–0
- vs Latvia 2 ties 2–0
- vs Lithuania 2 ties 2–0
- vs / Rhodesia/Zimbabwe 2 ties 2–0
- vs South Korea 2 ties 2–0
- vs Tunisia 2 ties 2–0
- vs Uzbekistan 2 ties 2–0
- vs Finland 2 ties 1–1
- vs Israel 2 ties 1–1
- vs Japan 2 ties 1–1
- vs Luxembourg 2 ties 1–1
- vs Mexico 2 ties 0–2
- vs Chile 2 ties 0–2
- vs Algeria 1 tie 1–0
- vs Benin 1 tie 1–0
- vs Botswana 1 tie 1–0
- vs (West Indies Federation) Caribbean/West Indies 1 tie 1–0
- vs Ivory Coast 1 tie 1–0
- vs Moldova 1 tie 1–0
- vs Netherlands 1 tie 1–0
- vs San Marino 1 tie 1–0
- vs Togo 1 tie 1–0
- vs Brazil 1 tie 0–1

Serbia has never played against six countries that have, at one point or another, competed in the Davis Cup World Group: Paraguay (7 years in the World Group), Ecuador (5), Belarus (4), Indonesia (2), Cuba (1), and Peru (1).

=== Record against continents ===
- vs Asia 19 ties 17–2 (89.5%)
- vs Africa 13 ties 11–2 (84.6%)
- vs Europe 158 ties 89–69 (56.3%)
- vs North America 8 ties 5–3 (62.5%)
- vs Oceania 9 ties 2–7 (22.2%)
- vs South America 6 ties 1–5 (16.7%)

=== Individual and team records ===
Record		Details	Report
Youngest player	15 years, 337 days	Janko Tipsarević versus Monaco on 24 May 2000	
Oldest player	44 years, 98 days	Josip Palada versus Great Britain on 13 May 1956	
Longest rubber duration	5 hours, 7 minutes	Janko Tipsarević defeated Radek Štěpánek (CZE) on 6 April 2012	
Longest tie duration	16 hours, 29 minutes	Serbia and Montenegro lost to Belgium on 29 April – 1 May 2005	
Longest tie-break	28 points (15–13)	Nikola Ćaćić/Miomir Kecmanović defeated Alejandro Davidovich Fokina/Marcel Granollers (ESP) on 13 September 2023	
Longest final set	38 games (18–20)	Nenad Zimonjić lost to Nuno Marques (POR) on 17 July 1998	
Most games in a set	38 (18–20)	Nenad Zimonjić lost to Nuno Marques (POR) on 17 July 1998	
Most games in a rubber	76	Ilija Bozoljac/Nenad Zimonjić defeated Bob Bryan/Mike Bryan (USA) on 6 April 2013	
Most games in a tie	261	Yugoslavia defeated France on 9–11 June 1946	
Most decisive victory (best of 5 rubbers)	15 sets (14–1; 87–25)	Yugoslavia defeated Portugal on 14–16 September 1979	
Most decisive victory (best of 3 rubbers)	3 sets (6–0; 36–6)	Yugoslavia defeated Benin on 10 May 1995	
Longest winning run	7 ties	From 20 September 2009 (World Group play-offs) to 8–10 July 2011 (World Group quarterfinals)	

== Captains ==
Denotes captains who won the Davis Cup title

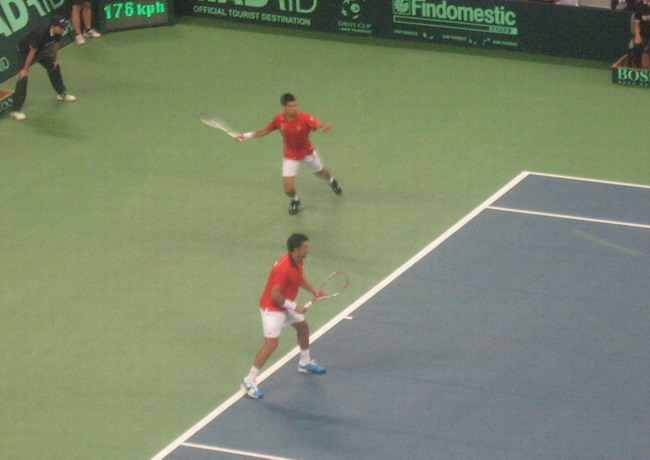
Djoković and Zimonjić during the doubles rubber against the Czech Republic in Belgrade on 18 September 2010

List of Serbia Davis Cup captains
Name	Residence	Tenure	Total
(Kingdom of Yugoslavia) Hinko Würt (1/2)	Zagreb	1927–1928	2
(Kingdom of Yugoslavia) Zvonko Fink (1/2)	Zagreb	1929	1
(Kingdom of Yugoslavia) Hinko Würt (2/2)	Zagreb	1930–1931	2
(Kingdom of Yugoslavia) Ivo Labaš	Zagreb	1932	1
(Kingdom of Yugoslavia) Franjo Šefer	Zagreb	1933	1
(Kingdom of Yugoslavia) Otton Heinz	Zagreb	1934	1
(Kingdom of Yugoslavia) Fedor Malančec	Zagreb	1935–1936	2
(Kingdom of Yugoslavia) Boško Miler	Zagreb	1937–1938	2
(Kingdom of Yugoslavia) Mladen Pavlica	Zagreb	1939	1
(Socialist Federal Republic of Yugoslavia) Pejo Lukinić	Zagreb	1946–1951	6
(Socialist Federal Republic of Yugoslavia) Dragoljub Jovanović	Beograd	1952	1
(Socialist Federal Republic of Yugoslavia) Vojislav Ristić	Beograd	1952	1
(Socialist Federal Republic of Yugoslavia) Zvonko Fink (2/2)	Zagreb	1953–54	2
(Socialist Federal Republic of Yugoslavia) Josip Palada	Zagreb	1955–57	3
(Socialist Federal Republic of Yugoslavia) Ivan Janošić	Zagreb	1958–59	2
(Socialist Federal Republic of Yugoslavia) Stjepan Tončić	Zagreb	1960–65	6
(Socialist Federal Republic of Yugoslavia) Radmilo Nikolić	Beograd	1966–73	8
(Socialist Federal Republic of Yugoslavia) Mladen Würt	Zagreb	1974–75	2
(Socialist Federal Republic of Yugoslavia) Nikica Nadali	Zagreb	1976–79	4
(Federal Republic of Yugoslavia) Radmilo Armenulić	Beograd	1980–96	17
(Federal Republic of Yugoslavia) Milan Čonkić	Novi Sad	1997–99	3
(Federal Republic of Yugoslavia) Nikola Špear	Subotica	2000	1
(Federal Republic of Yugoslavia) Goran Bubanj	Beograd	2001–2002	2
(Federal Republic of Yugoslavia) Nenad Zimonjić (1/2)	Beograd	2003–2004	2
(Serbia) Dejan Petrović	Kragujevac	2005–2006	2
(Serbia) Bogdan Obradović	Beograd	2007–2016	10
(Serbia) Nenad Zimonjić (2/2)	Beograd	2017–2020	4
(Serbia) Viktor Troicki	Beograd	2021–	6

== Other competitions ==
In addition to the Davis Cup, the Serbian national tennis team has achieved success in major tournaments in both individual and team categories.

Team competitions

Outcome	Date	Team competition	Surface	Team members	Opponents	Score
Champions	27 May 1990	World Team Cup, Düsseldorf, Germany	Clay	(Socialist Federal Republic of Yugoslavia) Slobodan Živojinović (Socialist Federal Republic of Yugoslavia) Goran Ivanišević (Socialist Federal Republic of Yugoslavia) Goran Prpić	(United States) Jim Courier (United States) Brad Gilbert (United States) Ken Flach (United States) Robert Seguso	3–0
Champions	4 Jan 1991	Hopman Cup, Perth, Australia	Hard	(Socialist Federal Republic of Yugoslavia) Monika Seleš (Socialist Federal Republic of Yugoslavia) Goran Prpić	(United States) Zina Garrison (United States) David Wheaton	3–0
Finalists	26 May 1991	World Team Cup, Düsseldorf, Germany	Clay	(Socialist Federal Republic of Yugoslavia) Slobodan Živojinović (Socialist Federal Republic of Yugoslavia) Goran Ivanišević (Socialist Federal Republic of Yugoslavia) Goran Prpić	(Sweden) Magnus Gustafsson (Sweden) Stefan Edberg (Sweden) Jonas Svensson	1–2
Finalists	4 Jan 2008	Hopman Cup, Perth, Australia	Hard	(Serbia) Jelena Janković (Serbia) Novak Djokovic	(United States) Serena Williams (United States) Mardy Fish	1–2
Champions	23 May 2009	World Team Cup, Düsseldorf, Germany	Clay	(Serbia) Janko Tipsarević (Serbia) Viktor Troicki (Serbia) Nenad Zimonjić	(Germany) Rainer Schüttler (Germany) Philipp Kohlschreiber (Germany) Nicolas Kiefer (Germany) Mischa Zverev	2–1
Champions	21 May 2012	World Team Cup, Düsseldorf, Germany	Clay	(Serbia) Janko Tipsarević (Serbia) Viktor Troicki (Serbia) Nenad Zimonjić (Serbia) Miki Janković	(Czech Republic) Tomáš Berdych (Czech Republic) Radek Štěpánek (Czech Republic) František Čermák	3–0
Finalists	5 Jan 2013	Hopman Cup, Perth, Australia	Hard	(Serbia) Ana Ivanovic (Serbia) Novak Djokovic	(Spain) Anabel Medina Garrigues (Spain) Fernando Verdasco	1–2
Champions	3–12 Jan 2020	ATP Cup, Sydney, Australia	Hard	(Serbia) Novak Djokovic (Serbia) Dušan Lajović (Serbia) Nikola Milojević (Serbia) Viktor Troicki (Serbia) Nikola Ćaćić	(Spain) Rafael Nadal (Spain) Roberto Bautista Agut (Spain) Pablo Carreño Busta (Spain) Albert Ramos Viñolas (Spain) Feliciano López	2–1

Olympic Games and Universiade medal tables

Here is the list of all Olympics Summer Games medals

Medal	Competition	Discipline	Team members
Bronze	2008 Olympics, Beijing	Men's singles	(Serbia) Novak Djokovic
Gold	2024 Olympics, Paris	Men's singles	(Serbia) Novak Djokovic

Here is the list of all Summer Universiade medals

Medal	Competition	Discipline	Team members
Gold	1961 Universiade, Sofia	Men's singles	(Socialist Federal Republic of Yugoslavia) Boro Jovanović
Gold	1961 Universiade, Sofia	Men's doubles	(Socialist Federal Republic of Yugoslavia) Boro Jovanović (Socialist Federal Republic of Yugoslavia) Nikola Pilić
Silver	1961 Universiade, Sofia	Men's singles	(Socialist Federal Republic of Yugoslavia) Nikola Pilić
Gold	1987 Universiade, Zagreb	Men's singles	(Socialist Federal Republic of Yugoslavia) Bruno Orešar
Gold	1987 Universiade, Zagreb	Mixed doubles	(Socialist Federal Republic of Yugoslavia) Sabrina Goleš (Socialist Federal Republic of Yugoslavia) Bruno Orešar
Silver	1987 Universiade, Zagreb	Men's singles	(Socialist Federal Republic of Yugoslavia) Igor Šarić
Bronze	1987 Universiade, Zagreb	Men's doubles	(Socialist Federal Republic of Yugoslavia) Igor Šarić (Socialist Federal Republic of Yugoslavia) Branko Horvat
Silver	2005 Universiade, İzmir	Men's doubles	(Serbia and Montenegro) Nikola Ćirić (Serbia and Montenegro) Darko Mađarovski
Gold	2009 Universiade, Belgrade	Men's Team	(Serbia) Aleksander Slović (Serbia) Saša Stojisavljević (Serbia) Aleksandar Grubin (Serbia) Boris Čonkić
Gold	2009 Universiade, Belgrade	Men's singles	(Serbia) Aleksander Slović
Bronze	2009 Universiade, Belgrade	Men's doubles	(Serbia) Aleksandar Grubin (Serbia) Boris Čonkić

== See also ==
- Davis Cup
- Serbia Billie Jean King Cup team
- Serbia at the Hopman Cup
- Serbia ATP Cup team
- Tennis Federation of Serbia
