= 2026 Davis Cup World Group I =

Tennis competition

The 2026 Davis Cup World Group I was held from 18 to 20 September 2026. The thirteen winners of this round will qualify for the 2027 Davis Cup Qualifiers first round while the thirteen losers will play at the 2027 Davis Cup World Group I play-offs.

== Teams ==
Twenty-six teams will participate in the World Group I, in series decided on a home and away basis.

These twenty-six teams are:

- 13 losing teams from the Qualifiers first round, held in February 2026
- 13 winning teams from the World Group I play-offs, held in February 2026

The 13 winning teams from the World Group I will play in the Qualifiers first round and the 13 losing teams will play in the World Group I play-offs in 2027.

#: Nations Ranking as of 9 February 2026.

Seeded teams

1. Australia (#8)
2. Argentina (#10)
3. Netherlands (#11)
4. Hungary (#17)
5. Brazil (#18)
6. Finland (#20)
7. Denmark (#21)
8. Serbia (#22)
9. Slovakia (#24)
10. Japan (#25)
11. Norway (#26)
12. Sweden (#27)
13. Peru (#28)

Unseeded teams

- Poland (#29)
- Switzerland (#30)
- Bulgaria (#31)
- Chinese Taipei (#32)
- Turkey (#33)
- Colombia (#34)
- Monaco (#35)
- Lithuania (#36)
- Greece (#37)
- Luxembourg (=#39)
- New Zealand (#43)
- China (#45)
- Paraguay (#54)

== Results summary ==
Home team	Score	Away team	Location	Venue	Surface
Australia [1]	3–1	Poland	Brisbane	Pat Rafter Arena	Hard
Argentina [2]	3–1	Turkey	Neuquén	Estadio Ruca Che	Hard (i)
Netherlands [3]	4–0	Colombia	's-Hertogenbosch	Maaspoort	Hard (i)
Luxembourg	0–4	Hungary [4]	Luxembourg City	d'Coque	Hard (i)
Brazil [5]	3–1	Switzerland	Rio de Janeiro	Farmasi Arena	Hard (i)
Finland [6]	1–3	Monaco	Espoo	Espoo Metro Areena	Hard (i)
Denmark [7]	3–2	Bulgaria	Hillerød	Royal Stage	Hard (i)
Serbia [8]	4–0	Lithuania	Niš	Čair Sports Center	Hard (i)
Slovakia [9]	3–2	Greece	Košice	NTC Košice	Clay
New Zealand	1–3	Japan [10]	Auckland	Trusts Arena	Hard (i)
Norway [11]	4–0	China	Trondheim	Trondheim Spektrum	Clay (i)
Chinese Taipei	3–2	Sweden [12]	Taipei	Taipei Tennis Center	Hard (i)
Peru [13]	3–2	Paraguay	Lima	Jockey Club del Perú	Clay

== Results ==
=== Australia vs. Poland ===
Australia
3
Pat Rafter Arena
Brisbane, Australia
19–20 September 2026
Hard

Poland
1

			1	2	3
1	(Australia) (Poland)	Alex de Minaur; Maks Kaśnikowski	6; 3	6; 0
2	(Australia) (Poland)	James Duckworth; Kamil Majchrzak	6; 2	3; 6	3; 6
3	(Australia) (Poland)	Rinky Hijikata / Max Purcell; Karol Drzewiecki / Jan Zieliński	7^{7} 6^{3}	6; 3
4	(Australia) (Poland)	Alex de Minaur; Kamil Majchrzak	6; 3	6; 3
5	(Australia) (Poland)	James Duckworth; Maks Kaśnikowski				not played

=== Argentina vs. Turkey ===
Argentina
3
Estadio Ruca Che
Neuquén, Argentina
19–20 September 2026
Hard (i)

Turkey
1

			1	2	3
1	(Argentina) (Turkey)	Francisco Cerúndolo; Yankı Erel	6; 0	6; 4
2	(Argentina) (Turkey)	Thiago Agustín Tirante; Mert Alkaya	6; 2	6; 4
3	(Argentina) (Turkey)	Guido Andreozzi / Andrés Molteni; Arda Azkara / Yankı Erel	4; 6	4; 6
4	(Argentina) (Turkey)	Francisco Cerúndolo; Mert Alkaya	6; 1	6; 0
5	(Argentina) (Turkey)	Thiago Agustín Tirante; Yankı Erel				not played

=== Netherlands vs. Colombia ===
Netherlands
4
Maaspoort
's-Hertogenbosch, Netherlands
18–19 September 2026
Hard (i)

Colombia
0

			1	2	3
1	(Netherlands) (Colombia)	Botic van de Zandschulp; Johan Alexander Rodriguez	4; 6	6; 1	7; 5
2	(Netherlands) (Colombia)	Tallon Griekspoor; Nicolás Mejía	6; 2	6; 4
3	(Netherlands) (Colombia)	Tallon Griekspoor / Botic van de Zandschulp; Nicolás Barrientos / Miguel Tobón	6; 3	6^{4} 7^{7}	6; 4
4	(Netherlands) (Colombia)	Jesper de Jong; Samuel Heredia	6; 2	6; 4
5	(Netherlands) (Colombia)	Tallon Griekspoor; Johan Alexander Rodriguez				not played

=== Luxembourg vs. Hungary ===
Luxembourg
0
d'Coque
Luxembourg City, Luxembourg
18–19 September 2026
Hard (i)

Hungary
4

			1	2	3
1	(Luxembourg) (Hungary)	Louis Van Herck; Fábián Marozsán	4; 6	4; 6
2	(Luxembourg) (Hungary)	Alex Knaff; Zsombor Piros	4; 6	0; 6
3	(Luxembourg) (Hungary)	Raphael Calzi / Alex Knaff; Matyas Fuele / Péter Makk	1; 6	6^{3} 7^{7}
4	(Luxembourg) (Hungary)	Matiej Reiter; Péter Makk	1; 6	2; 6
5	(Luxembourg) (Hungary)	Louis Van Herck; Zsombor Piros				not played

=== Brazil vs. Switzerland ===
Brazil
3
Farmasi Arena
Rio de Janeiro, Brazil
18–19 September 2026
Hard (i)

Switzerland
1

			1	2	3
1	(Brazil) (Switzerland)	João Fonseca; Dominic Stricker	4; 6	6; 3	6; 2
2	(Brazil) (Switzerland)	Gustavo Heide; Stan Wawrinka	4; 6	7^{7} 6^{4}	6; 4
3	(Brazil) (Switzerland)	Orlando Luz / Rafael Matos; Jakub Paul / Dominic Stricker	7^{7} 6^{1}	6; 2
4	(Brazil) (Switzerland)	Matheus Pucinelli de Almeida; Rémy Bertola	6; 3	4; 6	[8] [10]
5	(Brazil) (Switzerland)	Gustavo Heide; Dominic Stricker				not played

=== Finland vs. Monaco ===
Finland
1
Espoo Metro Areena
Espoo, Finland
18–19 September 2026
Hard (i)

Monaco
3

			1	2	3
1	(Finland) (Monaco)	Otto Virtanen; Lucas Catarina	6; 0	6; 3
2	(Finland) (Monaco)	Eero Vasa; Valentin Vacherot	3; 6	6^{3} 7^{7}
3	(Finland) (Monaco)	Harri Heliövaara / Patrik Niklas-Salminen; Romain Arneodo / Hugo Nys	6; 3	4; 6	3; 6
4	(Finland) (Monaco)	Otto Virtanen; Valentin Vacherot	6^{3} 7^{7}	6; 4	4; 6
5	(Finland) (Monaco)	Eero Vasa; Lucas Catarina				not played

=== Denmark vs. Bulgaria ===
Denmark
3
Royal Stage
Hillerød, Denmark
18–19 September 2026
Hard (i)

Bulgaria
2

			1	2	3
1	(Denmark) (Bulgaria)	Elmer Møller; Grigor Dimitrov	7^{7} 6^{2}	3; 6	4; 6
2	(Denmark) (Bulgaria)	Holger Rune; Iliyan Radulov	6; 3	6; 3
3	(Denmark) (Bulgaria)	August Holmgren / Johannes Ingildsen; Alexander Donski / Petr Nesterov	6; 4	2; 6	6^{6} 7^{8}
4	(Denmark) (Bulgaria)	Holger Rune; Grigor Dimitrov	3; 6	6; 3	7^{7} 6^{4}
5	(Denmark) (Bulgaria)	Elmer Møller; Iliyan Radulov	6; 2	6; 4

=== Serbia vs. Lithuania ===
Serbia
4
Čair Sports Center
Niš, Serbia
19–20 September 2026
Hard (i)

Lithuania
0

			1	2	3
1	(Serbia) (Lithuania)	Miomir Kecmanović; Edas Butvilas	7; 5	1; 6	7; 5
2	(Serbia) (Lithuania)	Hamad Medjedovic; Vilius Gaubas	6; 4	6; 4
3	(Serbia) (Lithuania)	Miomir Kecmanović / Stefan Latinović; Edas Butvilas / Vilius Gaubas	7^{7} 6^{5}	3; 6	6; 3
4	(Serbia) (Lithuania)	Ognjen Milić; Pijus Vaitiekūnas	6; 2	6; 2
5	(Serbia) (Lithuania)	Hamad Medjedovic; Edas Butvilas				not played

=== Slovakia vs. Greece ===
Slovakia
3
NTC Košice
Košice, Slovakia
19–20 September 2026
Clay

Greece
2

			1	2	3
1	(Slovakia) (Greece)	Alex Molčan; Stefanos Sakellaridis	6; 1	6; 1
2	(Slovakia) (Greece)	Norbert Gombos; Stefanos Tsitsipas	6^{3} 7^{7}	4; 6
3	(Slovakia) (Greece)	Miloš Karol / Lukáš Pokorný; Petros Tsitsipas / Stefanos Tsitsipas	7^{7} 6^{4}	6; 3
4	(Slovakia) (Greece)	Alex Molčan; Stefanos Tsitsipas	6; 2	3; 6	4; 6
5	(Slovakia) (Greece)	Norbert Gombos; Stefanos Sakellaridis	6; 4	7^{7} 6^{4}

=== New Zealand vs. Japan ===
New Zealand
1
Trusts Arena
Auckland, New Zealand
19–20 September 2026
Hard (i)

Japan
3

			1	2	3
1	(New Zealand) (Japan)	Anton Shepp; Rei Sakamoto	5; 7	4; 6
2	(New Zealand) (Japan)	James Watt; Sho Shimabukuro	6; 3	3; 6	4; 6
3	(New Zealand) (Japan)	Ajeet Rai / Finn Reynolds; Yosuke Watanuki / Takeru Yuzuki	7; 5	7^{7} 6^{5}
4	(New Zealand) (Japan)	Anton Shepp; Sho Shimabukuro	3; 6	3; 6
5	(New Zealand) (Japan)	James Watt; Rei Sakamoto				not played

=== Norway vs. China ===
Norway
4
Trondheim Spektrum
Trondheim, Norway
18–19 September 2026
Clay (i)

China
0

			1	2	3
1	(Norway) (China)	Casper Ruud; Te Rigele	6; 1	7^{7} 6^{1}
2	(Norway) (China)	Nicolai Budkov Kjær; Cui Jie	4; 6	6; 4	6; 4
3	(Norway) (China)	Nicolai Budkov Kjær / Viktor Durasovic; Te Rigele / Zhang Zhizhen	6^{5} 7^{7}	6; 4	7^{7} 6^{2}
4	(Norway) (China)	Casper Ruud; Fnu Nidunjianzan	6; 2	6; 0
5	(Norway) (China)	Nicolai Budkov Kjær; Te Rigele				not played

=== Chinese Taipei vs. Sweden ===
Chinese Taipei
3
Taipei Tennis Center
Taipei, Chinese Taipei
19–20 September 2026
Hard (i)

Sweden
2

			1	2	3
1	(Chinese Taipei) (Sweden)	Hsu Yu-hsiou; Olle Wallin	6; 3	2; 6	5; 7
2	(Chinese Taipei) (Sweden)	Tseng Chun-hsin; Karl Friberg	6; 3	6; 0
3	(Chinese Taipei) (Sweden)	Ray Ho / Hsu Yu-hsiou; André Göransson / Erik Grevelius	4; 6	5; 7
4	(Chinese Taipei) (Sweden)	Tseng Chun-hsin; Olle Wallin	6; 1	6; 4
5	(Chinese Taipei) (Sweden)	Wu Tung-lin; Max Dahlin	6; 4	6; 4

=== Peru vs. Paraguay ===
Peru
3
Jockey Club del Perú
Lima, Peru
18–19 September 2026
Clay

Paraguay
2

			1	2	3
1	(Peru) (Paraguay)	Ignacio Buse; Hernando Jose Escurra Isnardi	7^{7} 6^{4}	4; 6	7; 5
2	(Peru) (Paraguay)	Juan Pablo Varillas; Adolfo Daniel Vallejo	5; 7	7^{8} 6^{6}	6; 3
3	(Peru) (Paraguay)	Ignacio Buse / Arklon Huertas del Pino; Adolfo Daniel Vallejo / Martin Antonio Vergara del Puerto	3; 6	5; 7
4	(Peru) (Paraguay)	Ignacio Buse; Adolfo Daniel Vallejo	7; 5	5; 7	6^{3} 7^{7}
5	(Peru) (Paraguay)	Juan Pablo Varillas; Hernando Jose Escurra Isnardi	6; 2	6; 4
