= Bogdan Obradović =

Serbian politician

Bogdan Obradović (Serbian Cyrillic: Богдан Обрадовић; born September 30, 1966) is a professional tennis coach in Serbia. He was the head coach of the Serbia Davis Cup team from 2007 to 2017 and led the team to its first ever victory in 2010. Obradović has also been a member of the National Assembly of Serbia since 2016, serving as a non-partisan member affiliated with the governing Serbian Progressive Party.

== Early life and career ==
Obradović studied at the University of Belgrade Faculty of Transport and Traffic Engineering. He lives in Belgrade.

== Davis Cup coach ==
Obradović was named as Serbia's Davis Cup head coach in 2007 and led the team to victory in the 2010 tournament with wins over the United States of America, Croatia, the Czech Republic, and France. After the final game, he was quoted as saying, "My players showed that they are mentally the strongest team in the world. We showed we are No. 1." He also led Serbia's team to the finals of the 2013 tournament, where they were narrowly defeated by the Czech Republic. He was replaced as Davis Cup coach by Nenad Zimonjić in January 2017.

== Member of the National Assembly ==
Obradović received the thirteenth position on the Progressive Party's Aleksandar Vučić – Serbia Is Winning electoral list in the 2016 Serbian parliamentary election and was elected when the list won a majority victory with 131 out of 250 mandates. He is a member of the assembly committee on education, science, technological development, and the information society and a deputy member of the culture and information committee.
