= Aleksandr Vasilenko =

Russian footballer

Personal information
- Full name: Aleksandr Vladimirovich Vasilenko
- Date of birth: 30 October 1986 (age 39)
- Place of birth: Moscow, Soviet Union
- Height: 1.78 m (5 ft 10 in)
- Position: Defender

Senior career*
| Years | Team | Apps | (Gls) |
| 2005–2006 | FC Presnya Moscow | 38 | (1) |
| 2007–2009 | FC Dynamo Vologda | 69 | (4) |
| 2010 | FC Torpedo-ZIL Moscow | 23 | (2) |
| 2011–2013 | FC Ufa | 56 | (3) |
| 2013 | FC Avangard Kursk | 12 | (2) |
| 2013–2014 | FC Ufa | 8 | (0) |
| 2014–2015 | FC Fakel Voronezh | 15 | (0) |
- * Club domestic league appearances and goals

Aleksandr Vladimirovich Vasilenko (Russian: Александр Владимирович Василенко; born 30 October 1986) is a Russian former professional football player.

== Career ==
Vasilenko has played in the Russian Football National League with FC Ufa on two occasions, with a six-month spell at FC Avangard Kursk in between.
