= Denmark Davis Cup team =

Danish national tennis team

Denmark
- Captain: Frederik Løchte Nielsen
- Nations Ranking: 20 ▲1 (21 September 2026)
- Colors: Red & White
- First year: 1921
- Years played: 96
- Ties played (W–L): 204 (108–96)
- Years in World Group: 11 (2–11)
- Best finish: Semifinal (1921)
- Most total wins: Frederik Nielsen (60–40)
- Most singles wins: Kurt Nielsen (42–23)
- Most doubles wins: Frederik Nielsen (26–15)
- Best doubles team: Thomas Kromann / Frederik Nielsen (14–8)
- Most ties played: Frederik Nielsen (47)
- Most years played: Torben Ulrich (20)
- Last updated on: November 2026.

The Denmark men's national tennis team represents Denmark in Davis Cup tennis competition and are governed by the Danish Tennis Association.

Denmark currently compete in the World Group I. They competed in the World Group from 1988 to 1989 and again from 1993 to 1996.

== History ==
Denmark competed in its first Davis Cup in 1921.

== Results and fixtures ==
The following are lists of match results and scheduled matches for the current year.

Win Loss Fixture

=== 2025 ===
2025 Davis Cup Qualifiers first round

Denmark
3
Royal Arena, Copenhagen, Denmark
31 January–1 February 2025
Hard (i)

Serbia
2

			1	2	3
1	(Denmark) (Serbia)	Elmer Møller; Miomir Kecmanović	6; 3	2; 6	1; 6
2	(Denmark) (Serbia)	Holger Rune; Hamad Medjedovic	6; 2	3; 6	1; 6
3	(Denmark) (Serbia)	Johannes Ingildsen / Holger Rune; Miomir Kecmanović / Hamad Medjedovic	6; 4	6; 4
4	(Denmark) (Serbia)	Holger Rune; Miomir Kecmanović	6; 2	6; 4
5	(Denmark) (Serbia)	Elmer Møller; Hamad Medjedovic	1; 6	6; 4	6; 3

2025 Davis Cup Qualifiers second round

Spain
2
Club de Tenis Puente Romano, Marbella, Spain
13–14 September 2025
Clay

Denmark
3

			1	2	3
1	(Spain) (Denmark)	Pablo Carreño Busta; Holger Rune	5; 7	3; 6
2	(Spain) (Denmark)	Jaume Munar; Elmer Møller	6; 2	1; 6	4; 6
3	(Spain) (Denmark)	Pedro Martínez / Jaume Munar; August Holmgren / Johannes Ingildsen	1; 6	6; 3	6; 2
4	(Spain) (Denmark)	Pedro Martínez; Holger Rune	6; 1	4; 6	7^{7} 6^{3}
5	(Spain) (Denmark)	Pablo Carreño Busta; Elmer Møller	6; 2	6; 3

=== 2026 ===
2026 Davis Cup Qualifiers first round

Croatia
3
Varaždin Arena, Varaždin, Croatia
6–7 February 2026
Hard (i)

Denmark
1

			1	2	3
1	(Croatia) (Denmark)	Matej Dodig; Elmer Møller	4; 6	6^{3} 7^{7}
2	(Croatia) (Denmark)	Dino Prižmić; August Holmgren	5; 7	6; 0	6; 2
3	(Croatia) (Denmark)	Nikola Mektić / Mate Pavić; Johannes Ingildsen / Carl Emil Overbeck	6; 2	7; 5
4	(Croatia) (Denmark)	Dino Prižmić; Elmer Møller	7^{7} 6^{5}	7^{7} 6^{2}
5	(Croatia) (Denmark)	Matej Dodig; August Holmgren				not played

2026 Davis Cup World Group I

Denmark
3
Royal Stage
Hillerød, Denmark
18–19 September 2026
Hard (i)

Bulgaria
2

			1	2	3
1	(Denmark) (Bulgaria)	Elmer Møller; Grigor Dimitrov	7^{7} 6^{2}	3; 6	4; 6
2	(Denmark) (Bulgaria)	Holger Rune; Iliyan Radulov	6; 3	6; 3
3	(Denmark) (Bulgaria)	August Holmgren / Johannes Ingildsen; Alexander Donski / Petr Nesterov	6; 4	2; 6	6^{6} 7^{8}
4	(Denmark) (Bulgaria)	Holger Rune; Grigor Dimitrov	3; 6	6; 3	7^{7} 6^{4}
5	(Denmark) (Bulgaria)	Elmer Møller; Iliyan Radulov	6; 2	6; 4

== Players ==
=== Current team ===
The following team was nominated for the 2026 Davis Cup World Group I in Denmark.

Team nominations for Qualifiers second round against Bulgaria.
Player	Born	ATP ranking		Debut	Nom	Ties	Win-loss			ATP Profile
Player	Born	Singles	Doubles	Debut	Nom	Ties	Singles	Doubles	Total	ATP Profile
Holger Rune	29 April 2003 (age 23)	144	–	2018	8	8	10–4	2–0	12–4	
Elmer Møller	9 July 2003 (age 23)	174	–	2022	11	6	8–6	–	8–6	
August Holmgren	22 April 1998 (age 28)	241	545	2017	14	10	7–4	2–2	9–6	
Carl Emil Overbeck	11 August 2001 (age 25)	289	335	2026	2	1	–	0–1	0–1	
Johannes Ingildsen	1 July 1997 (age 29)	956	157	2019	13	12	1–2	6–4	7–6	
Non-playing captain: Frederik Nielsen

== See also ==
- Davis Cup
- Denmark Billie Jean King Cup team
- Denmark at the Hopman Cup
