= 2023 Davis Cup =

111th edition of the Davis Cup

Details
- Duration: 3 February – 26 November 2023
- Edition: 111th

Champion
- Winning nation: Italy (2nd title)

Italy defeated Australia 2–0 in the final tennis match of the 2023 Davis Cup. It was the 111th edition of the Davis Cup, an international team competition between national teams in men's tennis, and was part of the 2023 ATP Tour calendar.

Macau, Nepal, and Seychelles made their first appearances in the tournament.

== Davis Cup Finals ==
=== Knockout stage ===
Date: 21–26 November 2023
Venue: Martin Carpena Arena, Málaga, Spain

Quarterfinals
21 November
Canada	1
Finland	2
22 November
Czech Republic	1
Australia	2
23 November
Italy	2
Netherlands	1
23 November
Serbia	2
Great Britain	0

Semifinals
24 November
Finland	0
Australia	2
25 November
Italy	2
Serbia	1

Final
26 November
Australia	0
Italy	2

=== Group stage ===
Date: 12–17 September 2023
Venues: Unipol Arena, Bologna, Italy
Manchester Arena, Manchester, Great Britain
Pavelló Municipal Font de Sant Lluís, Valencia, Spain
Arena Gripe, Split, Croatia
Surface: Hard indoor

16 nations took part in the group stage of the finals. The qualification was as follows:

- 2 finalists of the 2022 Finals (Australia and Canada)
- 2 wild card teams (Italy and Spain)
- 12 winners of the qualifying round, in February 2023

TH = Title holder, 2022F = Finalist from the 2022 tournament, WC = Wild card, H = Host

Participating teams
Australia (2022F)	Canada (TH)	Chile	Croatia (H)
Czech Republic	Finland	France	Great Britain (H)
Italy (WC) (H)	Netherlands	Serbia	South Korea
Spain (WC) (H)	Sweden	Switzerland	United States

==== Group stage results ====
Qualified for the Knockout stage
Eliminated

G = Group, T = Ties, M = Matches

G	Winner			Runner-up			Third			Fourth		
G	Nation	T	M	Nation	T	M	Nation	T	M	Nation	T	M
A	Canada	3–0	8–1	Italy	2–1	5–4	Chile	1–2	4–5	Sweden	0–3	1–8
B	Great Britain	3–0	6–3	Australia	2–1	6–3	France	1–2	5–4	Switzerland	0–3	1–8
C	Czech Republic	3–0	9–0	Serbia	2–1	6–3	Spain	1–2	2–7	South Korea	0–3	1–8
D	Netherlands	2–1	5–4	Finland	2–1	6–3	United States	1–2	3–6	Croatia	1–2	4–5

=== Qualifying round ===
Date: 3–5 February 2023

Twenty-four teams played for twelve spots in the Finals, in series decided on a home and away basis.

These twenty-four teams were:

- 12 teams ranked 3rd–16th in the 2022 Finals except the 2 wild card teams
- 12 winning teams from 2022 World Group I

The 12 winning teams from the qualifying round played at the Finals and the 12 losing teams played at the World Group I.

#: Nations ranking as of 28 November 2022.

Seeded teams

1. Croatia (#1)
2. France (#3)
3. United States (#5)
4. Germany (#6)
5. Great Britain (#9)
6. Serbia (#10)
7. Kazakhstan (#11)
8. Belgium (#12)
9. Sweden (#13)
10. Netherlands (#14)
11. Argentina (#15)
12. Czech Republic (#17)

Unseeded teams

- Austria (#18)
- Colombia (#19)
- Chile (#21)
- South Korea (#22)
- Hungary (#24)
- Slovakia (#27)
- Finland (#28)
- Bosnia and Herzegovina (#29)
- Uzbekistan (#30)
- Norway (#31)
- Portugal (#33)
- Switzerland (#40)

Home team	Score	Away team	Location	Venue	Surface
Croatia [1]	3–1	Austria	Rijeka	Centar Zamet	Hard (i)
Hungary	2–3	France [2]	Tatabánya	Multifunctional Arena	Hard (i)
Uzbekistan	0–4	United States [3]	Tashkent	Olympic Tennis School	Hard (i)
Germany [4]	2–3	Switzerland	Trier	Trier Arena	Hard (i)
Colombia	1–3	Great Britain [5]	Cota	Pueblo Viejo Country Club	Clay (i)
Norway	0–4	Serbia [6]	Oslo	Oslo Tennisarena	Hard (i)
Chile	3–1	Kazakhstan [7]	La Serena	Campus Trentino	Clay
South Korea	3–2	Belgium [8]	Seoul	Olympic Tennis Court	Hard (i)
Sweden [9]	3–1	Bosnia and Herzegovina	Stockholm	Royal Tennis Hall	Hard (i)
Netherlands [10]	4–0	Slovakia	Groningen	MartiniPlaza	Hard (i)
Finland	3–1	Argentina [11]	Espoo	Espoo Metro Areena	Hard (i)
Portugal	1–3	Czech Republic [12]	Maia	Complexo Municipal de Ténis	Clay (i)

== World Group I ==
Date: 14–17 September 2023

Twenty-four teams participated in the World Group I, in series decided on a home and away basis.

These twenty-four teams are:

- 12 losing teams from qualifying round, in February 2023
- 12 winning teams from World Group I play-offs, in February 2023

#: Nations ranking as of 6 February 2023.

Seeded teams

1. Germany (#5)
2. Kazakhstan (#14)
3. Belgium (#16)
4. Argentina (#18)
5. Colombia (#19)
6. Hungary (#22)
7. Japan (#23)
8. Austria (#24)
9. Slovakia (#25)
10. Norway (#26)
11. Romania (#27)
12. Brazil (#28)

Unseeded teams

- Bosnia and Herzegovina (#29)
- Portugal (#30)
- Israel (#31)
- Uzbekistan (#33)
- Peru (#34)
- Turkey (#35)
- Ukraine (#36)
- Chinese Taipei (#37)
- Denmark (#38)
- Lithuania (#39)
- Bulgaria (#41)
- Greece (#42)

Home team	Score	Away team	Location	Venue	Surface
Bosnia and Herzegovina	0–4	Germany [1]	Mostar	Tennis Club	Clay
Bulgaria	1–3	Kazakhstan [2]	Sofia	National Tennis Centre	Clay
Belgium [3]	3–1	Uzbekistan	Hasselt	Sporthal Alverberg	Hard (i)
Argentina [4]	4–0	Lithuania	Buenos Aires	Lawn Tennis Club	Clay
Ukraine	3–2	Colombia [5]	Kaspi (Georgia)	Garikula Tennis Club	Hard
Hungary [6]	4–0	Turkey	Keszthely	Helikon Teniszcentrum	Clay
Israel	3–2	Japan [7]	Tel Aviv	Shlomo Group Arena	Hard (i)
Austria [8]	1–3	Portugal	Schwechat	Multiversum	Hard (i)
Greece	1–3	Slovakia [9]	Athens	Panathenaic Stadium	Hard
Peru	4–1	Norway [10]	Lima	Lawn Tennis de la Exposición	Clay
Romania [11]	1–3	Chinese Taipei	Mamaia	Tennis Club IDU	Clay
Denmark	1–3	Brazil [12]	Hillerød	Royal Stage	Hard (i)

=== Play-offs ===
Date: 3–5 February 2023

Twenty-four teams played for twelve spots in the World Group I, in series decided on a home and away basis.

These twenty-four teams are:

- 12 losing teams from 2022 World Group I
- 12 winning teams from 2022 World Group II

The 12 winning teams from the play-offs will play at the World Group I and the 12 losing teams will play at the World Group II.

#: Nations ranking as of 28 November 2022.

Seeded teams

1. Japan (#20)
2. Ecuador (#23)
3. Brazil (#25)
4. India (#26)
5. Romania (#32)
6. Israel (#34)
7. Peru (#35)
8. Mexico (#36)
9. Ukraine (#37)
10. Turkey (#38)
11. Pakistan (#39)
12. New Zealand (#41)

Unseeded teams

- Lebanon (#43)
- Lithuania (#44)
- Denmark (#45)
- Chinese Taipei (#47)
- Slovenia (#48)
- Poland (#49)
- Greece (#51)
- Latvia (#55)
- Bulgaria (#56)
- Ireland (#63)
- China (#70)
- Thailand (#72)

Home team	Score	Away team	Location	Venue	Surface
Japan [1]	4–0	Poland	Miki	Bourbon Beans Dome	Hard (i)
Greece	3–1	Ecuador [2]	Athens	Olympic Sports Complex	Hard (i)
Brazil [3]	4–0	China	Florianópolis	Estádio de Tênis Guga Kuerten	Clay
Denmark	3–2	India [4]	Hillerød	Royal Stage	Hard (i)
Thailand	2–3	Romania [5]	Nonthaburi	Lawn Tennis Association	Hard
Latvia	2–3	Israel [6]	Riga	Arena Riga	Hard (i)
Peru [7]	4–0	Ireland	Lima	Estadio Asia	Clay
Mexico [8]	1–3	Chinese Taipei	Metepec	Club Deportivo la Asunción	Clay
Ukraine [9]	3–1	Lebanon	Leszno (Poland)	Leszno Tennis Club	Hard (i)
Turkey [10]	4–0	Slovenia	Istanbul	Enka Spor Kulübü	Hard (i)
Lithuania	4–0	Pakistan [11]	Vilnius	SEB Arena	Hard (i)
New Zealand [12]	1–3	Bulgaria	Christchurch	Wilding Park	Hard

== World Group II ==
Date: 14–17 September 2023

Twenty-four teams participated in the World Group II, in series decided on a home and away basis.

These twenty-four teams are:

- 12 losing teams from World Group I play-offs, in February 2023
- 12 winning teams from World Group II play-offs, in February 2023

#: Nations ranking as of 6 February 2023.

Seeded teams

1. Ecuador (#32)
2. India (#40)
3. New Zealand (#43)
4. Mexico (#44)
5. Pakistan (#45=)
6. Uruguay (#45=)
7. Lebanon (#47)
8. Slovenia (#48)
9. Tunisia (#49)
10. El Salvador (#50)
11. Hong Kong (#51)
12. Poland (#52)

Unseeded teams

- Latvia (#53)
- Barbados (#54)
- Morocco (#55)
- Indonesia (#56)
- Ireland (#57)
- Egypt (#58)
- Monaco (#59)
- Jamaica (#60)
- China (#61)
- Georgia (#62)
- Thailand (#63)
- Luxembourg (#65)

Home team	Score	Away team	Location	Venue	Surface
Monaco	1–3	Ecuador [1]	Roquebrune-Cap-Martin	Monte Carlo Country Club	Clay
India [2]	4–1	Morocco	Lucknow	Mini Stadium	Hard
New Zealand [3]	3–1	Thailand	Invercargill	ILT Stadium	Hard (i)
Mexico [4]	3–1	China	Mérida	Lorenzo Molina Casares	Clay
Pakistan [5]	5–0	Indonesia	Islamabad	Pakistan Sports Complex	Grass
Uruguay [6]	1–3	Egypt	Montevideo	Carrasco Lawn Tennis Club	Clay
Lebanon [7]	4–0	Jamaica	Beirut	Automobile and Touring Club of Lebanon	Clay
Slovenia [8]	2–3	Luxembourg	Ljubljana	Tenis Center Tivoli	Clay
Georgia	3–1	Tunisia [9]	Kaspi	Garikula Tennis Club	Hard
El Salvador [10]	1–4	Ireland	Sonsonate	Complejo de Tenis	Clay
Hong Kong [11]	2–3	Latvia	Hong Kong	Victoria Park Tennis Stadium	Hard
Poland [12]	4–0	Barbados	Grodzisk Mazowiecki	Akademia Tenis Kozerki	Hard

=== Play-offs ===
Date: 2–6 February 2023

Twenty-four teams played for twelve spots in the World Group II, in series decided on a home and away basis.

These twenty-four teams are:

- 12 losing teams from 2022 World Group II
- 12 teams promoted from their 2022 Group III zone:
  - 3 from Europe
  - 3 from Asia/Oceania
  - 3 from Americas
  - 3 from Africa

The 12 winning teams from the play-offs will play at the World Group II and the 12 losing teams will play at the 2023 Group III of the corresponding continental zone.

#: Nations ranking as of 28 November 2022.

Seeded teams

1. Uruguay (#42)
2. Bolivia (#46)
3. Tunisia (#50)
4. South Africa (#52)
5. Barbados (#53)
6. Dominican Republic (#54)
7. Hong Kong (#57)
8. El Salvador (#58)
9. Estonia (#59)
10. Egypt (#60)
11. Morocco (#61)
12. Indonesia (#62)

Unseeded teams

- Paraguay (#64)
- Monaco (#65)
- Venezuela (#66)
- Zimbabwe (#67)
- Vietnam (#68)
- Jamaica (#69)
- Pacific Oceania (#71)
- Georgia (#73)
- Cyprus (#74)
- Luxembourg (#76)
- Jordan (#77)
- Ivory Coast (#84)

Home team	Score	Away team	Location	Venue	Surface
Zimbabwe	2–3	Uruguay [1]	Harare	Harare Sports Club	Hard
Georgia	4–0	Bolivia [2]	Leszno (Poland)	Leszno Tennis Club	Hard (i)
Tunisia [3]	3–2	Cyprus	Tunis	Cité Nationale Sportive El Menzah	Hard
Luxembourg	4–1	South Africa [4]	Esch-sur-Alzette	Centre National de Tennis	Hard (i)
Barbados [5]	3–2	Pacific Oceania	Bridgetown	National Tennis Centre	Hard
Monaco	4–0	Dominican Republic [6]	Roquebrune-Cap-Martin (France)	Monte Carlo Country Club	Clay
Venezuela	1–3	Hong Kong [7]	Puerto Cabello	Centro Nacional de Tenis	Hard
Jordan	1–3	El Salvador [8]	Amman	Jordan Tennis Federation Courts	Hard (i)
Jamaica	3–2	Estonia [9]	Kingston	Eric Bell National Tennis Centre	Hard
Egypt [10]	3–2	Paraguay	Cairo	Gezira Sporting Club	Clay
Ivory Coast	1–3	Morocco [11]	Abidjan	Le Central Tennis Club	Hard
Vietnam	2–3	Indonesia [12]	Từ Sơn	Hanaka Paris Ocean Park	Hard

== Group III ==
The top three nations of each continental zone will be promoted to the 2024 World Group II play-offs and the last two nations will be relegated to the 2024 Group IV.

=== Americas zone ===
Dates: 19–24 June 2023
Location: Club Internacional de Tenis, Asunción, Paraguay (Clay)

Participating teams

- Bahamas
- Bermuda
- Bolivia
- Costa Rica
- Dominican Republic
- Honduras
- Panama
- Paraguay
- Venezuela

Promotions/Relegations

- Paraguay, Bolivia and Costa Rica qualify for the 2024 Davis Cup World Group II play-offs
- Panama and Honduras are relegated to 2024 Americas Zone Group IV

=== Asia/Oceania zone ===
Date: 26–29 July 2023
Location: Sri Lanka Tennis Association Courts, Colombo, Sri Lanka (Clay)

Participating teams

- Cambodia
- Iran
- Jordan
- Malaysia
- Pacific Oceania
- Saudi Arabia
- Sri Lanka
- Vietnam

Promotions/Relegations

- Iran, Pacific Oceania and Vietnam qualify for the 2024 Davis Cup World Group II play-offs
- Cambodia and Sri Lanka are relegated to 2024 Asia/Oceania Zone Group IV

Inactive teams

- Philippines (suspended)

=== Europe zone ===
Date: 14–17 June 2023
Location: Herodotou Tennis Academy, Larnaca, Cyprus (Hard)

Participating teams

- Cyprus
- Estonia
- Malta
- Moldova
- Montenegro
- North Macedonia
- San Marino

Promotions/Relegations

- Estonia, Moldova and Cyprus qualify for the 2024 Davis Cup World Group II play-offs
- San Marino and Malta are relegated to 2024 Europe Zone Group IV

=== Africa zone ===
Date: 9–12 August 2023
Location: University of Pretoria, Pretoria, South Africa (Hard)

Participating teams

- Algeria
- Benin
- Ivory Coast
- Namibia
- South Africa
- Senegal
- Togo
- Zimbabwe

Promotions/Relegations

- South Africa, Zimbabwe and Togo qualify for the 2024 Davis Cup World Group II play-offs
- Algeria and Senegal are relegated to 2024 Davis Cup Africa Zone Group IV

== Group IV ==
The top two nations of each continental zone will be promoted to the 2024 Group III and the last two nations from the Asia/Oceania and Africa zone will be relegated to the 2024 Group V.

=== Americas zone ===
Date: 31 July – 5 August 2023
Location: National Racquet Sports Centre, Tacarigua, Trinidad and Tobago (Hard)

Participating teams

- Antigua and Barbuda
- Aruba
- Cuba
- Guatemala
- Haiti
- Nicaragua
- Puerto Rico
- Trinidad and Tobago
- U.S. Virgin Islands

Inactive team

- Eastern Caribbean
- Saint Lucia

Promotions

- Guatemala and Puerto Rico qualify for the 2024 Americas Zone Group III

=== Asia/Oceania zone ===
Date: 18–21 October 2023
Location: Megasaray Tennis Academy, Antalya, Turkey

Participating teams

- Guam
- Iraq
- Kuwait
- Kyrgyzstan
- Singapore
- Syria
- Turkmenistan
- United Arab Emirates

Promotions/Relegations

- Singapore and Syria qualify for the 2024 Asia/Oceania Zone Group III
- Guam and Turkmenistan are relegated to 2024 Asia/Oceania Zone Group V

=== Europe zone ===
Date: 26–29 July 2023
Location: Tennis Club Bellevue, Ulcinj, Montenegro (Clay)

Participating teams

- Albania
- Andorra
- Armenia
- Azerbaijan
- Iceland
- Kosovo
- Liechtenstein

Inactive teams

- Belarus (suspended)
- Russia (suspended)

Promotions

- Kosovo and Azerbaijan qualify for the 2024 Europe Zone Group III

=== Africa zone ===
Date: 26–29 July 2023
Location: Ecology Tennis Club, Kigali, Rwanda (Clay)

Participating teams

- Angola
- Botswana
- Cameroon
- Ghana
- Kenya
- Mozambique
- Nigeria
- Rwanda

Promotions/Relegations

- Ghana and Nigeria qualify for the 2024 Africa Zone Group III
- Mozambique and Botswana are relegated to 2024 Africa Zone Group V

== Group V ==
The top two nations of each continental zone will be promoted to the 2024 Group IV.

=== Asia/Oceania zone ===
Date: 25–28 October 2023
Location: Polytechnic University, Isa Town, Bahrain (Hard)

Participating teams

- Bahrain
- Bangladesh
- Bhutan
- Brunei
- Laos
- Macau
- Maldives
- Mongolia
- Myanmar
- Nepal
- Qatar
- Tajikistan
- Yemen

Inactive teams

- Oman

Promotions

- Myanmar and Qatar qualify for the 2024 Asia/Oceania Zone Group IV

=== Africa zone ===
Date: 21–24 June 2023
Location: Cercle de Kinshasa, Kinshasa, DR Congo (Clay)

Participating teams

- Burundi
- Congo
- DR Congo
- Djibouti
- Ethiopia
- Gabon
- Lesotho
- Madagascar
- Mauritius
- Seychelles
- Tanzania
- Uganda

Inactive teams

- Burkina Faso
- Libya
- Mali
- Sudan
- Zambia

Promotions

- Burundi and DR Congo qualify for the 2024 Africa Zone Group IV
