= 2023 Davis Cup Finals =

Men's tennis event

- Date: 12 September – 26 November 2023
- Edition: 4th
- Draw: 16 teams
- Surface: Hard indoor
- Location: Bologna, Italy; Manchester, Great Britain; Valencia, Spain; Split, Croatia; Málaga, Spain
- Venue: Unipol Arena; Manchester Arena; Pavelló Municipal Font de Sant Lluís; Arena Gripe; Martin Carpena Arena

Champions
- Italy
- Davis Cup

Italy defeated Australia in the final, 2–0 to win the 2023 Davis Cup. It was Italy's second Davis Cup title, having previously won in 1976.

The Finals, formerly known as World Group, were the highest level of Davis Cup competition in 2023. They took place from 12 to 17 September and from 21 to 26 November 2023. The ties were contested in a best-of-three rubbers format and played on one day. There were two singles followed by a doubles.

Canada was the defending champion, but lost in the quarterfinals to Finland.

== Group stage ==
=== Participating teams ===
16 nations took part in the group stage of the finals. The qualification was as follows:

- 2 finalists of the 2022 Finals (Australia and Canada)
- 2 wild card teams (Italy and Spain)
- 12 winners of the qualifying round, in February 2023

TH = Title holder, 2022F = Finalist from the 2022 tournament, WC = Wild card, H = Host

Participating teams
Australia (2022F)	Canada (TH)	Chile	Croatia (H)
Czech Republic	Finland	France	Great Britain (H)
Italy (WC) (H)	Netherlands	Serbia	South Korea
Spain (WC) (H)	Sweden	Switzerland	United States

=== Seeds ===
The seedings were based on the Davis Cup Ranking of 6 February 2023. The winner of the 2022 Finals Canada were seeded No. 1 and Australia, as runners-up in 2022, were seeded No. 2, with Spain and Croatia also seeded based on the latest Davis Cup nations ranking.

1. Canada
2. Australia
3. Spain
4. Croatia

The remaining 12 nations were distributed in Pots 2–4 according to the latest Davis Cup nations ranking. Four host nations, Croatia, Great Britain, Italy and Spain were placed in different groups.

=== Format ===
The 16 teams were divided in four round robin groups of four teams each. The top two teams in each group qualified for the quarterfinals. Group A was hosted in Bologna, Group B was hosted in Manchester, Group C was hosted in Valencia, and Group D was hosted in Split.

=== Team nominations ===
SR = Singles ranking, DR = Doubles ranking.

Rankings are as of 11 September 2023.

==== Group A ====
Canada
Player	SR	DR
Shapovalov	31	202
Diallo	158	453
Pospisil	187	575
Galarneau	200	422
Stevenson	1248	247
Captain: Dancevic

| class="col-break " style=" padding-left: 1em;" |

Chile
Player	SR	DR
Jarry	22	332
Garín	103	–
Barrios Vera	114	735
Tabilo	124	865
Lama	424	990
Captain: Massú

| class="col-break " style=" padding-left: 1em;" |

Italy
Player	SR	DR
Musetti	18	284
Sonego	38	183
Arnaldi	47	579
Vavassori	139	42
Bolelli	–	43
Captain: Volandri

| class="col-break " style=" padding-left: 1em;" |

Sweden
Player	SR	DR
Ymer	175	–
Borg	334	1314
Friberg	391	1007
Bergevi	1103	175
Göransson	–	71
Captain: Hedsberg

==== Group B ====
Australia
Player	SR	DR
de Minaur	12	285
Purcell	43	45
Thompson	55	111
Kokkinakis	74	148
Ebden	–	8
Captain: Hewitt

| class="col-break " style=" padding-left: 1em;" |

France
Player	SR	DR
Mannarino	34	147
Humbert	36	–
Fils	44	491
Roger-Vasselin	–	11
Mahut	–	32
Captain: Grosjean

| class="col-break " style=" padding-left: 1em;" |

Great Britain
Player	SR	DR
Norrie	17	–
Evans	27	115
Murray	41	573
Draper	106	–
Skupski	–	3
Captain: Smith

| class="col-break " style=" padding-left: 1em;" |

Switzerland
Player	SR	DR
Wawrinka	40	217
Stricker	90	259
Hüsler	101	227
Riedi	152	231
Ritschard	211	853
Captain: Lüthi

==== Group C ====
Czech Republic
Player	SR	DR
Lehečka	30	149
Macháč	119	–
Menšík	151	514
Pavlásek	–	57
Captain: Navrátil

| class="col-break " style=" padding-left: 1em;" |

Serbia
Player	SR	DR
Djokovic	1	–
Djere	37	575
Kecmanović	48	184
Lajović	52	865
Ćaćić	–	62
Captain: Troicki

| class="col-break " style=" padding-left: 1em;" |

South Korea
Player	SR	DR
Kwon	112	503
Hong	194	642
Chung	316	144
Nam	640	126
Song	–	185
Captain: Kim

| class="col-break " style=" padding-left: 1em;" |

Spain
Player	SR	DR
Davidovich Fokina	25	583
Bautista Agut	42	–
Zapata Miralles	75	405
Ramos Viñolas	95	–
Granollers	–	15
Captain: Ferrer

==== Group D ====
Croatia
Player	SR	DR
Gojo	77	–
Prižmić	168	1727
Ajduković	206	1330
Dodig	–	2
Pavić	–	22
Captain: Martić

| class="col-break " style=" padding-left: 1em;" |

Finland
Player	SR	DR
Ruusuvuori	57	402
Virtanen	125	343
Kaukovalta	988	796
Heliövaara	–	30
Niklas-Salminen	–	110
Captain: Nieminen

| class="col-break " style=" padding-left: 1em;" |

Netherlands
Player	SR	DR
Griekspoor	24	87
van de Zandschulp	68	64
Brouwer	172	599
Koolhof	–	4
Middelkoop	–	34
Captain: Haarhuis

| class="col-break " style=" padding-left: 1em;" |

United States
Player	SR	DR
Tiafoe	11	205
Paul	13	333
McDonald	39	50
Krajicek	–	1
Ram	–	5
Captain: Bryan

== Group stage results ==
Qualified for the Knockout stage
Eliminated

=== Overview ===
G = Group, T = Ties, M = Matches, S = Sets

G	Winner				Runner-up				Third				Fourth			
G	Nation	T	M	S	Nation	T	M	S	Nation	T	M	S	Nation	T	M	S
A	Canada	3–0	8–1	16–4	Italy	2–1	5–4	12–11	Chile	1–2	4–5	11–11	Sweden	0–3	1–8	4–17
B	Great Britain	3–0	6–3	13–11	Australia	2–1	6–3	14–6	France	1–2	5–4	12–10	Switzerland	0–3	1–8	4–16
C	Czech Republic	3–0	9–0	18–4	Serbia	2–1	6–3	13–8	Spain	1–2	2–7	6–14	South Korea	0–3	1–8	6–17
D	Netherlands	2–1	5–4	13–11	Finland	2–1	6–3	13–9	United States	1–2	3–6	9–14	Croatia	1–2	4–5	11–12

=== Group A ===
Pos.	Country	Ties	Matches	Sets	Sets %	Games	Games %
1	Canada	3–0	8–1	16–4	80%	123–100	55%
2	Italy	2–1	5–4	12–11	52%	121–116	51%
3	Chile	1–2	4–5	11–11	50%	116–115	50%
4	Sweden	0–3	1–8	4–17	19%	93–122	43%

==== Sweden vs. Chile ====
Sweden
0
Unipol Arena, Bologna
12 September 2023

Chile
3

			1	2	3
1	(Sweden) (Chile)	Leo Borg; Cristian Garín	6^{6} 7^{8}	6; 3	5; 7
2	(Sweden) (Chile)	Elias Ymer; Nicolás Jarry	2; 6	4; 6
3	(Sweden) (Chile)	Filip Bergevi / André Göransson; Tomás Barrios Vera / Alejandro Tabilo	4; 6	5; 7

==== Canada vs. Italy ====
Canada
3
Unipol Arena, Bologna
13 September 2023

Italy
0

			1	2	3
1	(Canada) (Italy)	Alexis Galarneau; Lorenzo Sonego	7^{10} 6^{8}	6; 4
2	(Canada) (Italy)	Gabriel Diallo; Lorenzo Musetti	7; 5	6; 4
3	(Canada) (Italy)	Alexis Galarneau / Vasek Pospisil; Matteo Arnaldi / Simone Bolelli	6^{4} 7^{7}	6; 4	7^{7} 6^{3}

==== Canada vs. Sweden ====
Canada
3
Unipol Arena, Bologna
14 September 2023

Sweden
0

			1	2	3
1	(Canada) (Sweden)	Vasek Pospisil; Leo Borg	7^{7} 6^{5}	5; 7	6; 2
2	(Canada) (Sweden)	Gabriel Diallo; Elias Ymer	6; 4	6; 3
3	(Canada) (Sweden)	Alexis Galarneau / Vasek Pospisil; Filip Bergevi / André Göransson	7^{11} 6^{9}	7^{7} 6^{3}

==== Italy vs. Chile ====
Italy
3
Unipol Arena, Bologna
15 September 2023

Chile
0

			1	2	3
1	(Italy) (Chile)	Matteo Arnaldi; Cristian Garín	2; 6	6; 4	6; 3
2	(Italy) (Chile)	Lorenzo Sonego; Nicolás Jarry	3; 6	7; 5	6; 4
3	(Italy) (Chile)	Lorenzo Musetti / Lorenzo Sonego; Tomás Barrios Vera / Alejandro Tabilo	6^{3} 7^{7}	6; 3	7^{7} 6^{2}

==== Canada vs. Chile ====
Canada
2
Unipol Arena, Bologna
16 September 2023

Chile
1

			1	2	3
1	(Canada) (Chile)	Alexis Galarneau; Alejandro Tabilo	6; 3	7^{7} 6^{5}
2	(Canada) (Chile)	Gabriel Diallo; Nicolás Jarry	4; 6	4; 6
3	(Canada) (Chile)	Alexis Galarneau / Vasek Pospisil; Tomás Barrios Vera / Alejandro Tabilo	6; 3	7^{9} 6^{7}

==== Italy vs. Sweden ====
Italy
2
Unipol Arena, Bologna
17 September 2023

Sweden
1

			1	2	3
1	(Italy) (Sweden)	Matteo Arnaldi; Leo Borg	6; 4	6; 3
2	(Italy) (Sweden)	Lorenzo Sonego; Elias Ymer	6; 4	6; 4
3	(Italy) (Sweden)	Simone Bolelli / Lorenzo Musetti; Filip Bergevi / André Göransson	6; 4	6^{4} 7^{7}	8; 10

=== Group B ===
Pos.	Country	Ties	Matches	Sets	Sets %	Games	Games %
1	Great Britain	3–0	6–3	13–11	54%	129–122	51%
2	Australia	2–1	6–3	14–6	70%	113–94	55%
3	France	1–2	5–4	12–10	55%	117–106	52%
4	Switzerland	0–3	1–8	4–16	20%	78–115	40%

==== France vs. Switzerland ====
France
3
Manchester Arena, Manchester
12 September 2023

Switzerland
0

			1	2	3
1	(France) (Switzerland)	Adrian Mannarino; Dominic Stricker	3; 6	6; 1	6; 4
2	(France) (Switzerland)	Ugo Humbert; Stan Wawrinka	6; 4	6; 4
3	(France) (Switzerland)	Nicolas Mahut / Édouard Roger-Vasselin; Marc-Andrea Hüsler / Stan Wawrinka	6; 2	6; 2

==== Australia vs. Great Britain ====
Australia
1
Manchester Arena, Manchester
13 September 2023

Great Britain
2

			1	2	3
1	(Australia) (United Kingdom)	Thanasi Kokkinakis; Jack Draper	7^{8} 6^{6}	3; 6	6^{4} 7^{7}
2	(Australia) (United Kingdom)	Alex de Minaur; Dan Evans	1; 6	6; 2	4; 6
3	(Australia) (United Kingdom)	Matthew Ebden / Max Purcell; Dan Evans / Neal Skupski	7^{7} 6^{5}	6; 4

==== Australia vs. France ====
Australia
2
Manchester Arena, Manchester
14 September 2023

France
1

			1	2	3
1	(Australia) (France)	Max Purcell; Adrian Mannarino	6^{4} 7^{7}	4; 6
2	(Australia) (France)	Alex de Minaur; Ugo Humbert	7^{7} 6^{2}	6; 3
3	(Australia) (France)	Matthew Ebden / Max Purcell; Nicolas Mahut / Édouard Roger-Vasselin	7; 5	6; 3

==== Great Britain vs. Switzerland ====
Great Britain
2
Manchester Arena, Manchester
15 September 2023

Switzerland
1

			1	2	3
1	(United Kingdom) (Switzerland)	Andy Murray; Leandro Riedi	6^{7} 7^{9}	6; 4	6; 4
2	(United Kingdom) (Switzerland)	Cameron Norrie; Stan Wawrinka	5; 7	4; 6
3	(United Kingdom) (Switzerland)	Dan Evans / Neal Skupski; Dominic Stricker / Stan Wawrinka	6; 3	6; 3

==== Australia vs. Switzerland ====
Australia
3
Manchester Arena, Manchester
16 September 2023

Switzerland
0

			1	2	3
1	(Australia) (Switzerland)	Thanasi Kokkinakis; Dominic Stricker	6; 3	7; 5
2	(Australia) (Switzerland)	Alex de Minaur; Marc-Andrea Hüsler	6; 4	6; 3
3	(Australia) (Switzerland)	Matthew Ebden / Max Purcell; Marc-Andrea Hüsler / Dominic Stricker	6; 2	6; 4

==== Great Britain vs. France ====
Great Britain
2
Manchester Arena, Manchester
17 September 2023

France
1

			1	2	3
1	(United Kingdom) (France)	Daniel Evans; Arthur Fils	3; 6	6; 3	6; 4
2	(United Kingdom) (France)	Cameron Norrie; Ugo Humbert	6^{5} 7^{7}	6; 3	5; 7
3	(United Kingdom) (France)	Daniel Evans / Neal Skupski; Nicolas Mahut / Édouard Roger-Vasselin	1; 6	7^{7} 6^{4}	7^{8} 6^{6}

=== Group C ===
Pos.	Country	Ties	Matches	Sets	Sets %	Games	Games %
1	Czech Republic	3–0	9–0	18–4	82%	130–100	57%
2	Serbia	2–1	6–3	13–8	62%	110–101	52%
3	Spain	1–2	2–7	6–14	30%	99–112	47%
4	South Korea	0–3	1–8	6–17	26%	103–129	44%

==== Serbia vs. South Korea ====
Serbia
3
Pavelló Municipal Font de Sant Lluís, Valencia
12 September 2023

South Korea
0

			1	2	3
1	(Serbia) (South Korea)	Dušan Lajović; Hong Seong-chan	6; 4	7^{7} 6^{3}
2	(Serbia) (South Korea)	Laslo Djere; Kwon Soon-woo	4; 6	6; 2	6; 2
3	(Serbia) (South Korea)	Nikola Ćaćić / Miomir Kecmanović; Nam Ji-sung / Song Min-kyu	3; 6	6; 4	7^{7} 6^{5}

==== Spain vs. Czech Republic ====
Spain
0
Pavelló Municipal Font de Sant Lluís, Valencia
13 September 2023

Czech Republic
3

			1	2	3
1	(Spain) (Czech Republic)	Bernabé Zapata Miralles; Tomáš Macháč	4; 6	4; 6
2	(Spain) (Czech Republic)	Alejandro Davidovich Fokina; Jiří Lehečka	6^{5} 7^{7}	5; 7
3	(Spain) (Czech Republic)	Alejandro Davidovich Fokina / Marcel Granollers; Jakub Menšík / Adam Pavlásek	7; 5	6^{6} 7^{8}	4; 6

==== Czech Republic vs. South Korea ====
Czech Republic
3
Pavelló Municipal Font de Sant Lluís, Valencia
14 September 2023

South Korea
0

			1	2	3
1	(Czech Republic) (South Korea)	Tomáš Macháč; Hong Seong-chan	7^{10} 6^{8}	4; 6	6; 2
2	(Czech Republic) (South Korea)	Jiří Lehečka; Kwon Soon-woo	6; 1	7; 5
3	(Czech Republic) (South Korea)	Jakub Menšík / Adam Pavlásek; Nam Ji-sung / Song Min-kyu	3; 6	7^{7} 6^{5}	6; 4

==== Spain vs. Serbia ====
Spain
0
Pavelló Municipal Font de Sant Lluís, Valencia
15 September 2023

Serbia
3

			1	2	3
1	(Spain) (Serbia)	Albert Ramos Viñolas; Laslo Djere	4; 6	4; 6
2	(Spain) (Serbia)	Alejandro Davidovich Fokina; Novak Djokovic	3; 6	4; 6
3	(Spain) (Serbia)	Alejandro Davidovich Fokina / Marcel Granollers; Nikola Ćaćić / Miomir Kecmanović	4; 6	6^{13} 7^{15}

==== Serbia vs. Czech Republic ====
Serbia
0
Pavelló Municipal Font de Sant Lluís, Valencia
16 September 2023

Czech Republic
3

			1	2	3
1	(Serbia) (Czech Republic)	Dušan Lajović; Jakub Menšík	3; 6	2; 6
2	(Serbia) (Czech Republic)	Laslo Djere; Jiří Lehečka	6^{7} 7^{9}	5; 7
3	(Serbia) (Czech Republic)	Nikola Ćaćić / Novak Djokovic; Tomáš Macháč / Adam Pavlásek	5; 7	7^{9} 6^{7}	[3] [10]

==== Spain vs. South Korea ====
Spain
2
Pavelló Municipal Font de Sant Lluís, Valencia
17 September 2023

South Korea
1

			1	2	3
1	(Spain) (South Korea)	Bernabé Zapata Miralles; Hong Seong-chan	6; 4	7; 5
2	(Spain) (South Korea)	Alejandro Davidovich Fokina; Kwon Soon-woo	6; 4	6; 4
3	(Spain) (South Korea)	Marcel Granollers / Albert Ramos-Viñolas; Nam Ji-sung / Song Min-kyu	7^{7} 6^{2}	6^{6} 7^{8}	8; 10

=== Group D ===
Pos.	Country	Ties	Matches	Sets	Sets %	Games	Games %
1	Netherlands	2–1	5–4	13–11	54%	131–120	52%
2	Finland	2–1	6–3	13–9	59%	116–118	50%
3	United States	1–2	3–6	9–14	39%	125–124	50%
4	Croatia	1–2	4–5	11–12	48%	111–121	48%

==== Netherlands vs. Finland ====
Netherlands
2
Arena Gripe, Split
12 September 2023

Finland
1

			1	2	3
1	(Netherlands) (Finland)	Botic van de Zandschulp; Otto Virtanen	6^{0} 7^{7}	4; 6
2	(Netherlands) (Finland)	Tallon Griekspoor; Emil Ruusuvuori	7^{9} 6^{7}	6; 3
3	(Netherlands) (Finland)	Wesley Koolhof / Matwé Middelkoop; Harri Heliövaara / Patrik Niklas-Salminen	6; 4	6^{5} 7^{7}	6; 3

==== Croatia vs. United States ====
Croatia
1
Arena Gripe, Split
13 September 2023

United States
2

			1	2	3
1	(Croatia) (United States)	Dino Prižmić; Mackenzie McDonald	4; 6	2; 6
2	(Croatia) (United States)	Borna Gojo; Frances Tiafoe	6; 4	7^{8} 6^{6}
3	(Croatia) (United States)	Ivan Dodig / Mate Pavić; Austin Krajicek / Rajeev Ram	6^{5} 7^{7}	7^{7} 6^{3}	2; 6

==== Netherlands vs. United States ====
Netherlands
2
Arena Gripe, Split
14 September 2023

United States
1

			1	2	3
1	(Netherlands) (United States)	Botic van de Zandschulp; Tommy Paul	7^{7} 6^{2}	6; 2
2	(Netherlands) (United States)	Tallon Griekspoor; Frances Tiafoe	6; 3	6^{7} 7^{9}	7^{7} 6^{3}
3	(Netherlands) (United States)	Wesley Koolhof / Matwé Middelkoop; Austin Krajicek / Rajeev Ram	7^{7} 6^{5}	6^{3} 7^{7}	3; 6

==== Croatia vs. Finland ====
Croatia
1
Arena Gripe, Split
15 September 2023

Finland
2

			1	2	3
1	(Croatia) (Finland)	Dino Prižmić; Otto Virtanen	4; 6	6; 3	3; 6
2	(Croatia) (Finland)	Borna Gojo; Emil Ruusuvuori	6^{3} 7^{7}	4; 6
3	(Croatia) (Finland)	Ivan Dodig / Mate Pavić; Harri Heliövaara / Patrik Niklas-Salminen	6; 4	7^{7} 6^{1}

==== United States vs. Finland ====
United States
0
Arena Gripe, Split
16 September 2023

Finland
3

			1	2	3
1	(United States) (Finland)	Mackenzie McDonald; Otto Virtanen	6^{5} 7^{7}	6; 1	6^{7} 7^{9}
2	(United States) (Finland)	Tommy Paul; Emil Ruusuvuori	6^{1} 7^{7}	4; 6
3	(United States) (Finland)	Austin Krajicek / Rajeev Ram; Harri Heliövaara / Patrick Kaukovalta	7^{8} 6^{6}	6^{5} 7^{7}	8; 10

==== Croatia vs. Netherlands ====
Croatia
2
Arena Gripe, Split
17 September 2023

Netherlands
1

			1	2	3
1	(Croatia) (Netherlands)	Duje Ajduković; Botic van de Zandschulp	3; 6	6; 3	5; 7
2	(Croatia) (Netherlands)	Borna Gojo; Tallon Griekspoor	4; 6	7^{7} 6^{2}	6; 4
3	(Croatia) (Netherlands)	Duje Ajduković / Mate Pavić; Wesley Koolhof / Matwé Middelkoop	3; 6	6; 4	10; 8

== Knockout stage ==
=== Bracket ===
All knockout stage matches took place on indoor hard courts at the Martin Carpena Arena, Málaga, Spain.

Quarterfinals
21 November
Canada	1
Finland	2
22 November
Czech Republic	1
Australia	2
23 November
Italy	2
Netherlands	1
23 November
Serbia	2
Great Britain	0

Semifinals
24 November
Finland	0
Australia	2
25 November
Italy	2
Serbia	1

Final
26 November
Australia	0
Italy	2

=== Team nominations ===
Rankings are as of 20 November 2023.

Australia
Player	SR	DR
de Minaur	12	176
Popyrin	40	258
Purcell	45	35
Thompson	56	105
Ebden	–	4
Captain: Hewitt

| class="col-break " style=" padding-left: 1em;" |

Canada
Player	SR	DR
Auger-Aliassime	29	163
Diallo	139	382
Galarneau	203	548
Raonic	318	–
Pospisil	434	570
Captain: Dancevic

| class="col-break " style=" padding-left: 1em;" |

Czech Republic
Player	SR	DR
Lehečka	31	147
Macháč	78	–
Menšík	147	546
Pavlásek	–	56
Captain: Navrátil

| class="col-break " style=" padding-left: 1em;" |

Finland
Player	SR	DR
Ruusuvuori	69	419
Virtanen	171	389
Kaukovalta	782	715
Heliövaara	–	29
Niklas-Salminen	–	123
Captain: Nieminen

Great Britain
Player	SR	DR
Norrie	18	193
Draper	60	–
Broady	103	236
Salisbury	–	7
Skupski	–	9
Captain: Smith

| class="col-break " style=" padding-left: 1em;" |

Italy
Player	SR	DR
Sinner	4	500
Musetti	27	280
Arnaldi	44	570
Sonego	47	243
Bolelli	–	55
Captain: Volandri

| class="col-break " style=" padding-left: 1em;" |

Netherlands
Player	SR	DR
Griekspoor	23	109
van de Zandschulp	51	83
Brouwer	164	444
Koolhof	–	8
Rojer	–	18
Captain: Haarhuis

| class="col-break " style=" padding-left: 1em;" |

Serbia
Player	SR	DR
Djokovic	1	–
Djere	33	570
Lajović	46	851
Kecmanović	55	158
Medjedovic	111	1358
Captain: Troicki

== Knockout stage results ==
=== Quarterfinals ===
==== Canada vs. Finland ====
Canada
1
Martin Carpena Arena, Málaga
21 November 2023

Finland
2

			1	2	3
1	(Canada) (Finland)	Milos Raonic; Patrick Kaukovalta	6; 3	7; 5
2	(Canada) (Finland)	Gabriel Diallo; Otto Virtanen	4; 6	5; 7
3	(Canada) (Finland)	Alexis Galarneau / Vasek Pospisil; Harri Heliövaara / Otto Virtanen	5; 7	3; 6

==== Czech Republic vs. Australia ====
Czech Republic
1
Martin Carpena Arena, Málaga
22 November 2023

Australia
2

			1	2	3
1	(Czech Republic) (Australia)	Tomáš Macháč; Jordan Thompson	6; 4	7; 5
2	(Czech Republic) (Australia)	Jiří Lehečka; Alex de Minaur	6; 4	6^{2} 7^{7}	5; 7
3	(Czech Republic) (Australia)	Jiří Lehečka / Adam Pavlásek; Matthew Ebden / Max Purcell	4; 6	5; 7

==== Italy vs. Netherlands ====
Italy
2
Martin Carpena Arena, Málaga
23 November 2023

Netherlands
1

			1	2	3
1	(Italy) (Netherlands)	Matteo Arnaldi; Botic van de Zandschulp	7^{8} 6^{6}	3; 6	6^{7} 7^{9}
2	(Italy) (Netherlands)	Jannik Sinner; Tallon Griekspoor	7^{7} 6^{3}	6; 1
3	(Italy) (Netherlands)	Jannik Sinner / Lorenzo Sonego; Tallon Griekspoor / Wesley Koolhof	6; 3	6; 4

==== Serbia vs. Great Britain ====
Serbia
2
Martin Carpena Arena, Málaga
23 November 2023

Great Britain
0

			1	2	3
1	(Serbia) (United Kingdom)	Miomir Kecmanović; Jack Draper	7^{7} 6^{2}	7^{8} 6^{6}
2	(Serbia) (United Kingdom)	Novak Djokovic; Cameron Norrie	6; 4	6; 4
3	(Serbia) (United Kingdom)	Novak Djokovic / Dušan Lajović; Joe Salisbury / Neal Skupski				not played

=== Semifinals ===
==== Finland vs. Australia ====
Finland
0
Martin Carpena Arena, Málaga
24 November 2023

Australia
2

			1	2	3
1	(Finland) (Australia)	Otto Virtanen; Alexei Popyrin	6^{5} 7^{7}	2; 6
2	(Finland) (Australia)	Emil Ruusuvuori; Alex de Minaur	4; 6	3; 6
3	(Finland) (Australia)	Harri Heliövaara / Patrik Niklas-Salminen; Matthew Ebden / Max Purcell				not played

==== Italy vs. Serbia ====
Italy
2
Martin Carpena Arena, Málaga
25 November 2023

Serbia
1

			1	2	3
1	(Italy) (Serbia)	Lorenzo Musetti; Miomir Kecmanović	7^{9} 6^{7}	2; 6	1; 6
2	(Italy) (Serbia)	Jannik Sinner; Novak Djokovic	6; 2	2; 6	7; 5
3	(Italy) (Serbia)	Jannik Sinner / Lorenzo Sonego; Novak Djokovic / Miomir Kecmanović	6; 3	6; 4

=== Final ===
==== Australia vs. Italy ====
Australia
0
Martin Carpena Arena, Málaga
26 November 2023

Italy
2

			1	2	3
1	(Australia) (Italy)	Alexei Popyrin; Matteo Arnaldi	5; 7	6; 2	4; 6
2	(Australia) (Italy)	Alex de Minaur; Jannik Sinner	3; 6	0; 6
3	(Australia) (Italy)	Matthew Ebden / Max Purcell; Simone Bolelli / Lorenzo Sonego				not played
