= 2023 Davis Cup World Group I =

Tennis competition

The 2023 Davis Cup World Group I was held from 14 to 17 September. The twelve winners from the World Group I will play at the qualifying round and the twelve losers will play at the World Group I Play-offs in 2024.

== Teams ==
Twenty-four teams participated in the World Group I, in series decided on a home and away basis. The seedings were based on the Nations Ranking.

These twenty-four teams were:

- 12 losing teams from the 2023 qualifying round, in February 2023
- 12 winning teams from the 2023 World Group I play-offs, in February 2023

The 12 winning teams from the World Group I will play at the qualifying round and the 12 losing teams will play at the World Group I Play-offs in 2024.

#: Nations Ranking as of 6 February 2023.

Seeded teams

- Germany (#5)
- Kazakhstan (#14)
- Belgium (#16)
- Argentina (#18)
- Colombia (#19)
- Hungary (#22)
- Japan (#23)
- Austria (#24)
- Slovakia (#25)
- Norway (#26)
- Romania (#27)
- Brazil (#28)

Unseeded teams

- Bosnia and Herzegovina (#29)
- Portugal (#30)
- Israel (#31)
- Uzbekistan (#33)
- Peru (#34)
- Turkey (#35)
- Ukraine (#36)
- Chinese Taipei (#37)
- Denmark (#38)
- Lithuania (#39)
- Bulgaria (#41)
- Greece (#42)

== Results summary ==
Home team	Score	Away team	Location	Venue	Surface
Bosnia and Herzegovina	0–4	Germany [1]	Mostar	Tennis Club	Clay
Bulgaria	1–3	Kazakhstan [2]	Sofia	National Tennis Centre	Clay
Belgium [3]	3–1	Uzbekistan	Hasselt	Sporthal Alverberg	Hard (i)
Argentina [4]	4–0	Lithuania	Buenos Aires	Lawn Tennis Club	Clay
Ukraine	3–2	Colombia [5]	Kaspi (Georgia)	Garikula Tennis Club	Hard
Hungary [6]	4–0	Turkey	Keszthely	Helikon Teniszcentrum	Clay
Israel	3–2	Japan [7]	Tel Aviv	Shlomo Group Arena	Hard (i)
Austria [8]	1–3	Portugal	Schwechat	Multiversum	Hard (i)
Greece	1–3	Slovakia [9]	Athens	Panathenaic Stadium	Hard
Peru	4–1	Norway [10]	Lima	Lawn Tennis de la Exposición	Clay
Romania [11]	1–3	Chinese Taipei	Mamaia	Tennis Club IDU	Clay
Denmark	1–3	Brazil [12]	Hillerød	Royal Stage	Hard (i)

== Results ==
=== Bosnia and Herzegovina vs. Germany ===
Bosnia and Herzegovina
0
Tennis Club, Mostar, Bosnia and Herzegovina
16–17 September 2023
Clay

Germany
4

			1	2	3
1	(Bosnia and Herzegovina) (Germany)	Nerman Fatić; Daniel Altmaier	6^{5} 7^{7}	2; 6
2	(Bosnia and Herzegovina) (Germany)	Damir Džumhur; Yannick Hanfmann	2; 6	1; 6
3	(Bosnia and Herzegovina) (Germany)	Mirza Bašić / Damir Džumhur; Kevin Krawietz / Tim Pütz	4; 6	2; 6
4	(Bosnia and Herzegovina) (Germany)	Andrej Nedić; Maximilian Marterer	1; 6	6^{4} 7^{7}
5	(Bosnia and Herzegovina) (Germany)	Nerman Fatić; Yannick Hanfmann				not played

=== Bulgaria vs. Kazakhstan ===
Bulgaria
1
National Tennis Centre, Sofia, Bulgaria
16–17 September 2023
Clay

Kazakhstan
3

			1	2	3
1	(Bulgaria) (Kazakhstan)	Dimitar Kuzmanov; Timofei Skatov	6; 3	4; 6	3; 6
2	(Bulgaria) (Kazakhstan)	Yanaki Milev; Alexander Bublik	4; 6	1; 6
3	(Bulgaria) (Kazakhstan)	Alexander Donski / Alexandar Lazarov; Alexander Bublik / Aleksandr Nedovyesov	6; 3	6; 3
4	(Bulgaria) (Kazakhstan)	Dimitar Kuzmanov; Alexander Bublik	4; 6	6^{4} 7^{7}
5	(Bulgaria) (Kazakhstan)	Yanaki Milev; Timofei Skatov				not played

=== Belgium vs. Uzbekistan ===
Belgium
3
Sporthal Alverberg, Hasselt, Belgium
16–17 September 2023
Hard (i)

Uzbekistan
1

			1	2	3
1	(Belgium) (Uzbekistan)	Kimmer Coppejans; Khumoyun Sultanov	6^{8} 7^{10}	6; 3	6^{6} 7^{8}
2	(Belgium) (Uzbekistan)	Joris De Loore; Sergey Fomin	7; 5	7^{7} 6^{2}
3	(Belgium) (Uzbekistan)	Sander Gillé / Joran Vliegen; Sergey Fomin / Maxim Shin	6; 1	3; 6	6; 2
4	(Belgium) (Uzbekistan)	Joris De Loore; Khumoyun Sultanov	6; 3	6; 4
5	(Belgium) (Uzbekistan)	Kimmer Coppejans; Sergey Fomin				not played

=== Argentina vs. Lithuania ===
Argentina
4
Lawn Tennis Club, Buenos Aires, Argentina
16–17 September 2023
Clay

Lithuania
0

			1	2	3
1	(Argentina) (Lithuania)	Francisco Cerúndolo; Vilius Gaubas	6; 1	6^{6} 7^{8}	6; 2
2	(Argentina) (Lithuania)	Sebastián Báez; Ričardas Berankis	7^{8} 6^{6}	5; 7	6; 3
3	(Argentina) (Lithuania)	Máximo González / Andrés Molteni; Tadas Babelis / Edas Butvilas	6; 4	6; 3
4	(Argentina) (Lithuania)	Tomás Martín Etcheverry; Edas Butvilas	6; 2	6; 4
5	(Argentina) (Lithuania)	Sebastián Báez; Vilius Gaubas				not played

=== Ukraine vs. Colombia ===
Ukraine
3
Garikula Tennis Club, Kaspi, Georgia
14–15 September 2023
Hard

Colombia
2

			1	2	3
1	(Ukraine) (Colombia)	Oleksii Krutykh; Nicolás Mejía	6; 4	6; 3
2	(Ukraine) (Colombia)	Vladyslav Orlov; Daniel Elahi Galán	7; 5	3; 6	0; 6
3	(Ukraine) (Colombia)	Illya Beloborodko / Viacheslav Bielinskyi; Juan Sebastián Cabal / Robert Farah	2; 6	4; 6
4	(Ukraine) (Colombia)	Oleksii Krutykh; Daniel Elahi Galán	3; 6	6; 0	6; 3
5	(Ukraine) (Colombia)	Vladyslav Orlov; Nicolás Mejía	5; 7	6; 4	7^{7} 6^{4}

=== Hungary vs. Turkey ===
Hungary
4
Helikon Teniszcentrum, Keszthely, Hungary
15–16 September 2023
Clay

Turkey
0

			1	2	3
1	(Hungary) (Turkey)	Fábián Marozsán; Altuğ Çelikbilek	7; 5	6; 2
2	(Hungary) (Turkey)	Zsombor Piros; Cem İlkel	6; 2	6; 3
3	(Hungary) (Turkey)	Fábián Marozsán / Máté Valkusz; Altuğ Çelikbilek / Cem İlkel	6; 3	6; 3
4	(Hungary) (Turkey)	Mátyás Füle; Ergi Kırkın	7^{7} 6^{3}	6; 2
5	(Hungary) (Turkey)	Zsombor Piros; Altuğ Çelikbilek				not played

=== Israel vs. Japan ===
Israel
3
Shlomo Group Arena, Tel Aviv, Israel
16–17 September 2023
Hard (i)

Japan
2

			1	2	3
1	(Israel) (Japan)	Yshai Oliel; Sho Shimabukuro	4; 6	6^{5} 7^{7}
2	(Israel) (Japan)	Daniel Cukierman; Shintaro Mochizuki	1; 6	7^{7} 6^{5}	6; 2
3	(Israel) (Japan)	Daniel Cukierman / Edan Leshem; Ben McLachlan / Kaito Uesugi	2; 6	6^{2} 7^{7}
4	(Israel) (Japan)	Daniel Cukierman; Sho Shimabukuro	2; 6	6; 1	7^{7} 6^{4}
5	(Israel) (Japan)	Yshai Oliel; Shintaro Mochizuki	2; 6	7; 5	6; 0

=== Austria vs. Portugal ===
Austria
1
Multiversum, Schwechat, Austria
15–16 September 2023
Hard (i)

Portugal
3

			1	2	3
1	(Austria) (Portugal)	Jurij Rodionov; Nuno Borges	6^{4} 7^{7}	6; 3	3; 6
2	(Austria) (Portugal)	Sebastian Ofner; João Sousa	7; 5	3; 6	6^{1} 7^{7}
3	(Austria) (Portugal)	Alexander Erler / Lucas Miedler; Nuno Borges / Francisco Cabral	7^{7} 6^{0}	7^{7} 6^{5}
4	(Austria) (Portugal)	Dennis Novak; Nuno Borges	3; 6	2; 6
5	(Austria) (Portugal)	Jurij Rodionov; João Sousa				not played

=== Greece vs. Slovakia ===
Greece
1
Panathenaic Stadium, Athens, Greece
16–17 September 2023
Hard

Slovakia
3

			1	2	3
1	(Greece) (Slovakia)	Alexandros Skorilas; Alex Molčan	1; 6	1; 6
2	(Greece) (Slovakia)	Stefanos Tsitsipas; Lukáš Klein	6^{3} 7^{7}	7^{7} 6^{5}	4; 0	retired
3	(Greece) (Slovakia)	Petros Tsitsipas / Stefanos Tsitsipas; Lukáš Klein / Igor Zelenay	3; 6	7^{7} 6^{5}	3; 6
4	(Greece) (Slovakia)	Stefanos Tsitsipas; Alex Molčan	6^{6} 7^{8}	6; 4	3; 6
5	(Greece) (Slovakia)	Alexandros Skorilas; Lukáš Klein				not played

=== Peru vs. Norway ===
Peru
4
Lawn Tennis de la Exposición, Lima, Peru
16–17 September 2023
Clay

Norway
1

			1	2	3
1	(Peru) (Norway)	Gonzalo Bueno; Viktor Durasovic	3; 6	4; 6
2	(Peru) (Norway)	Juan Pablo Varillas; Nicolai Budkov Kjær	7; 5	6; 4
3	(Peru) (Norway)	Arklon Huertas del Pino / Juan Pablo Varillas; Viktor Durasovic / Herman Høyeraal	6; 4	6; 2
4	(Peru) (Norway)	Juan Pablo Varillas; Viktor Durasovic	6; 1	6; 1
5	(Peru) (Norway)	Ignacio Buse; Nicolai Budkov Kjær	6; 2	4; 6	11; 9

=== Romania vs. Chinese Taipei ===
Romania
1
Tennis Club IDU, Mamaia, Romania
15–16 September 2023
Clay

Chinese Taipei
3

			1	2	3
1	(Romania) (Chinese Taipei)	Nicholas David Ionel; Tseng Chun-hsin	3; 6	0; 6
2	(Romania) (Chinese Taipei)	Marius Copil; Hsu Yu-hsiou	6^{5} 7^{7}	5; 7
3	(Romania) (Chinese Taipei)	Victor Vlad Cornea / Cezar Crețu; Hsu Yu-hsiou / Huang Tsung-hao	1; 6	4; 6
4	(Romania) (Chinese Taipei)	Cezar Crețu; Wu Tung-lin	6; 4	6; 4
5	(Romania) (Chinese Taipei)	Marius Copil; Tseng Chun-hsin				not played

=== Denmark vs. Brazil ===
Denmark
1
Royal Stage, Hillerød, Denmark
15–16 September 2023
Hard (i)

Brazil
3

			1	2	3
1	(Denmark) (Brazil)	Holger Rune; Thiago Monteiro	7^{7} 6^{4}	6^{5} 7^{7}	2; 6
2	(Denmark) (Brazil)	August Holmgren; Thiago Seyboth Wild	4; 6	2; 6
3	(Denmark) (Brazil)	Johannes Ingildsen / Christian Sigsgaard; Rafael Matos / Felipe Meligeni Alves	7^{7} 6^{5}	5; 7	6^{5} 7^{7}
4	(Denmark) (Brazil)	Elmer Møller; Marcelo Demoliner	6; 3	6^{6} 7^{8}	10; 4
5	(Denmark) (Brazil)	August Holmgren; Thiago Monteiro				not played
