= 2019 Davis Cup Finals teams =

For the 2019 Davis Cup Finals, the 18 participating nations had to submit its team nominations to the International Tennis Federation (ITF) by 29 October 2019, 20 days before the Monday of the week of the event. Teams could nominate up to 5 players, or up to 4 additional players if the captain is also listed as a player. A maximum of 3 nominated players may be changed by 11:00 CET (10:00 UTC) on 17 November 2019, the day before the first round robin match. In the event that a player on the submitted team list suffered an injury or illness prior to the start of the tournament, that player could be replaced, provided that the tournament's Independent Doctor and Referee both confirmed that the injury or illness is severe enough to prevent the player's participation in the tournament, with final discretion resting with the Davis Cup Committee. Team nominations were announced by the ITF on 21 October 2019.

The ATP ranking listed for each player is from 18 November, the Monday of the week of the Finals. Players are sorted by singles ranking, followed by doubles ranking for players without a singles ranking. Player statistics history shown covers all matches played by the players in previous Davis Cup ties before 17 November 2019, the day before the first tie of the Finals is played.

== Group A ==
=== France ===
Captain: Sébastien Grosjean

Player	ATP rankings		Davis Cup Win–loss			Ref
Player	Singles	Doubles	Total	Singles	Doubles	Ref
Gaël Monfils	10	–	12–2	12–2	0–0	
Benoît Paire	24	102	1–0	1–0	0–0	
Jo-Wilfried Tsonga	29	702	27–10	21–9	6–1	
Pierre-Hugues Herbert	65	5	7–2	0–1	7–1	
Nicolas Mahut	197	3	10–4	1–2	9–2	

=== Serbia ===
Captain: Nenad Zimonjić

Player	ATP rankings		Davis Cup Win–loss			Ref
Player	Singles	Doubles	Total	Singles	Doubles	Ref
Novak Djokovic	2	139	34–10	31–7	3–3	
Dušan Lajović	34	109	10–8	10–8	0–0	
Filip Krajinović	40	452	6–5	6–2	6–5	
Viktor Troicki	159	716	23–14	17–11	6–3	
Janko Tipsarević	221	191	41–18	34–15	7–3	

=== Japan ===
Captain: Satoshi Iwabuchi

Player	ATP rankings		Davis Cup Win–loss			Ref
Player	Singles	Doubles	Total	Singles	Doubles	Ref
Yoshihito Nishioka	73	289	4–5	4–3	0–2	
Yasutaka Uchiyama	81	430	5–10	2–1	3–9	
Yūichi Sugita	104	–	9–10	8–5	1–5	
Taro Daniel	111	709	6–6	6–6	0–0	
Ben McLachlan	–	44	1–3	0–0	1–3	

== Group B ==
=== Croatia ===
Captain: Željko Krajan

Player	ATP rankings		Davis Cup Win–loss			Ref
Player	Singles	Doubles	Total	Singles	Doubles	Ref
Borna Ćorić	28	–	10–7	10–7	0–0	
Borna Gojo	280	–	0–0	0–0	0–0	
Ivan Dodig	–	12	18–28	5–13	13–15	
Nikola Mektić	–	15	4–1	1–1	3–0	
Mate Pavić	–	18	0–5	0–1	0–4	

=== Spain ===
Captain: Sergi Bruguera

Player	ATP rankings		Davis Cup Win–loss			Ref
Player	Singles	Doubles	Total	Singles	Doubles	Ref
Rafael Nadal	1	–	29–5	24–1	5–4	
Roberto Bautista Agut	9	–	6–5	6–5	0–0	
Pablo Carreño Busta	27	113	3–4	2–3	1–1	
Feliciano López	62	55	15–21	6–8	9–13	
Marcel Granollers	112	25	5–6	2–1	3–5	

=== Russia ===
Captain: Shamil Tarpishchev

Player	ATP rankings		Davis Cup Win–loss			Ref
Player	Singles	Doubles	Total	Singles	Doubles	Ref
Karen Khachanov	17	86	6–7	6–4	0–3	
Andrey Rublev	23	75	8–7	4–4	4–3	
Evgeny Donskoy	113	–	5–6	3–4	2–2	

== Group C ==
=== Argentina ===
Captain: Gastón Gaudio

Player	ATP rankings		Davis Cup Win–loss			Ref
Player	Singles	Doubles	Total	Singles	Doubles	Ref
Diego Schwartzman	14	40	4–4	4–3	0–1	
Guido Pella	25	58	5–5	4–4	1–1	
Leonardo Mayer	92	61	14–6	11–3	3–3	
Horacio Zeballos	–	4	7–5	2–1	5–4	
Máximo González	–	34	1–2	0–0	1–2	

=== Germany ===
Captain: Michael Kohlmann

Player	ATP rankings		Davis Cup Win–loss			Ref
Player	Singles	Doubles	Total	Singles	Doubles	Ref
Jan-Lennard Struff	35	56	8–3	4–3	4–0	
Philipp Kohlschreiber	79	288	22–15	18–12	4–3	
Dominik Koepfer	94	312	0–0	0–0	0–0	
Kevin Krawietz	478	9	0–0	0–0	0–0	
Andreas Mies	–	11	0–0	0–0	0–0	

=== Chile ===
Captain: Nicolás Massú

Player	ATP rankings		Davis Cup Win–loss			Ref
Player	Singles	Doubles	Total	Singles	Doubles	Ref
Cristian Garín	33	343	11–12	10–11	1–1	
Nicolás Jarry	77	70	14–8	9–5	5–3	
Alejandro Tabilo	208	486	0–0	0–0	0–0	
Marcelo Tomás Barrios Vera	326	525	1–1	1–0	0–1	
Hans Podlipnik Castillo	–	128	11–5	3–2	8–3	

== Group D ==
=== Belgium ===
Captain: Johan Van Herck

Player	ATP rankings		Davis Cup Win–loss			Ref
Player	Singles	Doubles	Total	Singles	Doubles	Ref
David Goffin	11	164	23–6	23–2	0–3	
Steve Darcis	158	–	23–18	22–11	1–7	
Kimmer Coppejans	161	279	4–2	3–2	1–0	
Joran Vliegen	–	39	1–1	0–0	1–1	
Sander Gillé	–	47	1–1	0–0	1–1	

=== Australia ===
Captain: Lleyton Hewitt

Player	ATP rankings		Davis Cup Win–loss			Ref
Player	Singles	Doubles	Total	Singles	Doubles	Ref
Alex de Minaur	18	141	1–3	1–3	0–0	
Nick Kyrgios	30	239	9–6	9–5	0–1	
John Millman	48	341	1–1	1–1	0–0	
Jordan Thompson	63	161	5–2	3–2	2–0	
John Peers	–	26	5–3	0–0	5–3	

=== Colombia ===
Captain: Pablo González

Player	ATP rankings		Davis Cup Win–loss			Ref
Player	Singles	Doubles	Total	Singles	Doubles	Ref
Daniel Elahi Galán	194	707=	4–1	4–1	0–0	
Santiago Giraldo	277	885=	27–17	27–17	0–0	
Alejandro González	470	616	7–5	7–5	0–0	
Juan Sebastián Cabal	–	1=	18–10	7–2	11–8	
Robert Farah	–	1=	12–9	1–3	11–6	

== Group E ==
=== Great Britain ===
Captain: Leon Smith

Player	ATP rankings		Davis Cup Win–loss			Ref
Player	Singles	Doubles	Total	Singles	Doubles	Ref
Dan Evans	42	151	7–14	7–14	0–0	
Kyle Edmund	69	149	3–5	3–5	0–0	
Andy Murray	126	87	39–8	30–3	9–5	
Jamie Murray	–	23	12–6	0–1	12–5	
Neal Skupski	–	31	0–0	0–0	0–0	

=== Kazakhstan ===
Captain: Dias Doskarayev

Player	ATP rankings		Davis Cup Win–loss			Ref
Player	Singles	Doubles	Total	Singles	Doubles	Ref
Alexander Bublik	57	322	1–0	1–0	0–0	
Mikhail Kukushkin	67	140	25–14	25–13	0–1	
Dmitry Popko	187	968	4–2	4–2	0–0	
Aleksandr Nedovyesov	281	189	7–11	2–6	5–5	
Andrey Golubev	745	168	24–12	16–7	8–5	

=== Netherlands ===
Captain: Paul Haarhuis

Player	ATP rankings		Davis Cup Win–loss			Ref
Player	Singles	Doubles	Total	Singles	Doubles	Ref
Robin Haase	163	33	37–22	27–14	10–8	
Tallon Griekspoor	179	491	0–1	0–1	0–0	
Botic van de Zandschulp	200	431	0–0	0–0	0–0	
Wesley Koolhof	–	14	0–0	0–0	0–0	
Jean-Julien Rojer	–	20	50–12^{†}	28–6^{†}	22–6^{†}	

^{†} Statistics shown for Jean-Julien Rojer include ties in which he played for the Netherlands Antilles team between 1998 and 2007.

== Group F ==
=== United States ===
Captain: Mardy Fish

Player	ATP rankings		Davis Cup Win–loss			Ref
Player	Singles	Doubles	Total	Singles	Doubles	Ref
Taylor Fritz	32	120	0–0	0–0	0–0	
Reilly Opelka	36	179	0–0	0–0	0–0	
Sam Querrey	44	79	11–9	10–9	1–0	
Frances Tiafoe	47	445=	0–2	0–2	0–0	
Jack Sock	–	118	7–3	4–3	3–0	

=== Italy ===
Captain: Corrado Barazzutti

Player	ATP rankings		Davis Cup Win–loss			Ref
Player	Singles	Doubles	Total	Singles	Doubles	Ref
Matteo Berrettini	8	208	1–1	1–0	0–1	
Fabio Fognini	12	150	28–13	21–8	7–5	
Lorenzo Sonego	52	455	0–0	0–0	0–0	
Andreas Seppi	72	297	24–21	20–19	4–2	
Simone Bolelli	339	80	19–15	7–9	12–6	

=== Canada ===
Captain: Frank Dancevic

Player	ATP rankings		Davis Cup Win–loss			Ref
Player	Singles	Doubles	Total	Singles	Doubles	Ref
Denis Shapovalov	15	50	7–4	7–3	0–1	
Félix Auger-Aliassime	21	–	1–2	1–1	0–1	
Brayden Schnur	103	315	0–2	0–2	–	
Vasek Pospisil	150	447	17–17	9–10	8–7	
