= Vladyslav Orlov =

Ukrainian tennis player

- Country (sports): Ukraine
- Born: 17 May 1995 (age 31) Kharkiv, Ukraine
- Height: 1.88 m (6 ft 2 in)
- Plays: Right-handed (two-handed backhand)
- Coach: Elena Iudina
- Prize money: US $228,370

Singles
- Career record: 3–4 (at ATP Tour level, Grand Slam level, and in Davis Cup)
- Career titles: 0
- Highest ranking: No. 350 (4 January 2021)
- Current ranking: No. 503 (14 September 2026)

Doubles
- Career record: 1–1 (at ATP Tour level, Grand Slam level, and in Davis Cup)
- Career titles: 0
- Highest ranking: No. 209 (24 June 2024)
- Current ranking: No. 554 (14 September 2026)
- Last updated on: 16 September 2026.

Vladyslav Orlov (born 17 May 1995) is a Ukrainian tennis player. He has a career high ATP singles ranking of world No. 350 achieved on 4 January 2021 and a doubles ranking of No. 209 achieved on 17 June 2024.

Orlov represents Ukraine at the Davis Cup, where he has a W/L record of 2–2.

== ATP Challenger and ITF Tour Finals ==
=== Singles: 23 (11–12) ===
Legend (singles) ATP Challenger Tour (0–0) ITF Futures/World Tennis Tour (11–12)	Titles by surface Hard (4–7) Clay (7–5) Grass (0–0) Carpet (0–0)

Result	W–L	Date	Tournament	Tier	Surface	Opponent	Score
Loss	0-1	Jul 2018	Sri Lanka F3, Colombo	Futures	Clay	(India) Manish Sureskhumar	6–7^{(6-8)}, 6–0, 1-6
Loss	0-2	May 2019	M15 Irpin, Ukraine	World Tennis Tour	Clay	(Ukraine) Artem Smirnov	2-6, 3-6
Loss	0-3	Jul 2019	M25 Nonthaburi, Thailand	World Tennis Tour	Hard	(Japan) Yuta Shimizu	4-6, 0-6
Win	1-3	Aug 2019	M15 Jakarta, Indonesia	World Tennis Tour	Hard	(Chinese Taipei) Lee Kuan-yi	7-5, 4–6, 6-4
Win	2-3	Aug 2019	M15 Irpin, Ukraine	World Tennis Tour	Clay	(Ukraine) Nikita Mashtakov	6-3, 6-1
Loss	2-4	Sep 2019	M15 Cairns, Australia	World Tennis Tour	Hard	(Australia) Blake Mott	5-7, 2-6
Loss	2-5	Oct 2020	M15 Sharm El Sheikh, Egypt	World Tennis Tour	Hard	(Netherlands) Gijs Brouwer	3-6, 6-7^{(4-7)}
Loss	2-6	Nov 2020	M15 Sharm El Sheikh, Egypt	World Tennis Tour	Hard	(Cyprus) Petros Chrysochos	3-6, 2-6
Win	3-6	Nov 2020	M15 Sharm El Sheikh, Egypt	World Tennis Tour	Hard	(Italy) Erik Crepaldi	6-0, 6-3
Win	4-6	Dec 2020	M15 Antalya, Turkey	World Tennis Tour	Clay	(Ukraine) Georgii Kravchenko	2.6, 6–3, 6-4
Win	5-6	May 2022	M25 Osijek, Croatia	World Tennis Tour	Clay	(Hungary) Mátyás Füle	6-1, 6-2
Win	6-6	Sep 2022	M25 Pirot, Serbia	World Tennis Tour	Clay	(Romania) Cezar Crețu	6-1, 4–6, 6-3
Loss	6-7	Oct 2022	M15 Sozopol, Bulgaria	World Tennis Tour	Hard	(Bulgaria) Alexandar Lazarov	1-6, 1-6
Win	7-7	Nov 2022	M25 Jerusalem, Israel	World Tennis Tour	Hard	(Poland) Filip Peliwo	1-6, 6–1, 7-5
Win	8-7	Nov 2022	M15 Bhilai, India	World Tennis Tour	Hard	(India) Niki Kaliyanda Poonacha	6-1, 6-4
Loss	8-8	Apr 2024	M15 Shymkent, Kazakhstan	World Tennis Tour	Clay	Savva Polukhin	2-6, 3-6
Loss	8-9	May 2024	M15 Monastir, Tunisia	World Tennis Tour	Hard	(Germany) Max Wiskandt	0-6, 0-3 ret.
Loss	8-10	Nov 2024	M15 Heraklion, Greece	World Tennis Tour	Hard	(Colombia) Adrià Soriano Barrera	6–2, 3–6, 0–6
Win	9-10	Jul 2025	M25 Kramsach, Austria	World Tennis Tour	Clay	(Bosnia and Herzegovina) Andrej Nedić	5–7, 6–1, 6–1
Loss	9-11	Aug 2025	M15 Kraków, Poland	World Tennis Tour	Clay	(Poland) Karol Filar	6–7^{(9–11)}, 4–6
Win	10-11	Sep 2025	M15 Szczawno-Zdrój, Poland	World Tennis Tour	Clay	(Poland) Marcel Zieliński	7–5, 6–7^{(5–7)}, 6–3
Loss	10-12	Jun 2026	M25 Skopje, North Macedonia	World Tennis Tour	Clay	(North Macedonia) Kalin Ivanovski	1–6, 6–0, 2–6
Win	11-12	Jul 2026	M25 Kramsach, Austria	World Tennis Tour	Clay	(Germany) Max Wiskandt	5–7, 6–3, 6–2

== Davis Cup ==
=== Participations: (2–2) ===
Group membership World Group (0–0) Qualifying Round (0–0) WG Play-off (0–0) Group I (2–2) Group II (0–0) Group III (0–0) Group IV (0–0)	Matches by surface Hard (2–2) Clay (0–0) Grass (0–0) Carpet (0–0)	Matches by type Singles (2–2) Doubles (0–0)

- ▲ ▼ indicates the outcome of the Davis Cup match followed by the score, date, place of event, the zonal classification and its phase, and the court surface.

Rubber outcome	No.	Rubber	Match type (partner if any)	Opponent nation	Opponent player(s)	Score
▼1–3; 15–16 September 2022; SEB Arena, Vilnius, Lithuania; World Group I First round; Hard (indoor) surface
Defeat	1	II	Singles	Hungary	Zsombor Piros	2–6, 2–6
▲3–1; 3–4 February 2023; Leszno Tennis Club, Leszno, Poland; World Group I Qualifying Round; Hard (indoor) surface
Victory	2	I	Singles	Lebanon	Hady Habib	6–4, 6–2
▲3–2; 14–15 September 2023; Garikula Tennis Club, Kaspi, Georgia; World Group I First round; Hard surface
Defeat	3	II	Singles	Colombia	Daniel Elahi Galán	7–5, 3–6, 6–0
Victory	4	V	Singles	Colombia	Nicolás Mejía	5–7, 6–4, 7–6^{(7–4)}
