= 2023 Davis Cup World Group II =

The 2023 Davis Cup World Group II was held from 15 to 17 September. The twelve winners from the World Group II will play at the World Group I Play-offs and the twelve losers will play at the World Group II Play-offs in 2024.

== Teams ==
Twenty-four teams participated in the World Group II, in series decided on a home and away basis. The seedings were based on the Nations Ranking.

These twenty-four teams were:

- 12 losing teams from the 2023 World Group I Play-offs, in February 2023
- 12 winning teams from the 2023 World Group II Play-offs, in February 2023

The 12 winning teams from the World Group II will play at the World Group I Play-offs and the 12 losing teams will play at the World Group II Play-offs in 2024.

#: Nations Ranking as of 6 February 2023.

Seeded teams

- Ecuador (#32)
- India (#40)
- New Zealand (#43)
- Mexico (#44)
- Pakistan (#45=)
- Uruguay (#45=)
- Lebanon (#47)
- Slovenia (#48)
- Tunisia (#49)
- El Salvador (#50)
- Hong Kong (#51)
- Poland (#52)

Unseeded teams

- Latvia (#53)
- Barbados (#54)
- Morocco (#55)
- Indonesia (#56)
- Ireland (#57)
- Egypt (#58)
- Monaco (#59)
- Jamaica (#60)
- China (#61)
- Georgia (#62)
- Thailand (#63)
- Luxembourg (#65)

== Results summary ==
Home team	Score	Away team	Location	Venue	Surface
Monaco	1–3	Ecuador [1]	Roquebrune-Cap-Martin	Monte Carlo Country Club	Clay
India [2]	4–1	Morocco	Lucknow	Mini Stadium	Hard
New Zealand [3]	3–1	Thailand	Invercargill	ILT Stadium	Hard (i)
Mexico [4]	3–1	China	Mérida	Lorenzo Molina Casares	Clay
Pakistan [5]	5–0	Indonesia	Islamabad	Pakistan Sports Complex	Grass
Uruguay [6]	1–3	Egypt	Montevideo	Carrasco Lawn Tennis Club	Clay
Lebanon [7]	4–0	Jamaica	Beirut	Automobile and Touring Club of Lebanon	Clay
Slovenia [8]	2–3	Luxembourg	Ljubljana	Tenis Center Tivoli	Clay
Georgia	3–1	Tunisia [9]	Kaspi	Garikula Tennis Club	Hard
El Salvador [10]	1–4	Ireland	Sonsonate	Complejo de Tenis	Clay
Hong Kong [11]	2–3	Latvia	Hong Kong	Victoria Park Tennis Stadium	Hard
Poland [12]	4–0	Barbados	Grodzisk Mazowiecki	Akademia Tenis Kozerki	Hard

== Results ==
=== Monaco vs. Ecuador ===
Monaco
1
Monte Carlo Country Club, Roquebrune-Cap-Martin
15–16 September 2023
Clay

Ecuador
3

			1	2	3
1	(Monaco) (Ecuador)	Valentin Vacherot; Álvaro Guillén Meza	6; 3	6^{4} 7^{7}	6^{4} 7^{7}
2	(Monaco) (Ecuador)	Lucas Catarina; Emilio Gómez	6; 3	3; 6	7; 5
3	(Monaco) (Ecuador)	Romain Arneodo / Hugo Nys; Gonzalo Escobar / Diego Hidalgo	4; 6	2; 6
4	(Monaco) (Ecuador)	Valentin Vacherot; Emilio Gómez	1; 6	6; 1	1; 6
5	(Monaco) (Ecuador)	Lucas Catarina; Álvaro Guillén Meza				not played

=== India vs. Morocco ===
India
4
Mini Stadium, Lucknow
16–17 September 2023
Hard

Morocco
1

			1	2	3
1	(India) (Morocco)	Sasikumar Mukund; Yassine Dlimi	7^{7} 6^{4}	5; 7	1; 4	retired
2	(India) (Morocco)	Sumit Nagal; Adam Moundir	6; 3	6; 3
3	(India) (Morocco)	Yuki Bhambri / Rohan Bopanna; Elliot Benchetrit / Younes Lalami Laaroussi	6; 2	6; 1
4	(India) (Morocco)	Sumit Nagal; Yassine Dlimi	6; 3	6; 3
5	(India) (Morocco)	Digvijay Pratap Singh; Walid Ahouda	6; 1	5; 7	10; 6

=== New Zealand vs. Thailand ===
New Zealand
3
ILT Stadium, Invercargill
15–16 September 2023
Hard (i)

Thailand
1

			1	2	3
1	(New Zealand) (Thailand)	Rubin Statham; Kasidit Samrej	6; 2	7^{10} 6^{8}
2	(New Zealand) (Thailand)	Ajeet Rai; Maximus Jones	6; 1	6; 3
3	(New Zealand) (Thailand)	Finn Reynolds / Artem Sitak; Pruchya Isaro / Wishaya Trongcharoenchaikul	6; 4	6; 2
4	(New Zealand) (Thailand)	Isaac Becroft; Maximus Jones	3; 6	6; 3	8; 10
5	(New Zealand) (Thailand)	Ajeet Rai; Kasidit Samrej				not played

=== Mexico vs. China ===
Mexico
3
Lorenzo Molina Casares, Mérida
16–17 September 2023
Clay

China
1

			1	2	3
1	(Mexico) (China)	Rodrigo Pacheco Méndez; Sun Fajing	5; 7	7^{7} 6^{2}	1; 1	retired
2	(Mexico) (China)	Ernesto Escobedo; Te Rigele	6; 1	4; 6	6^{6} 7^{8}
3	(Mexico) (China)	Santiago González / Miguel Ángel Reyes-Varela; Sun Fajing / Wang Xiaofei	6; 4	6; 4
4	(Mexico) (China)	Ernesto Escobedo; Zhou Yi	7^{9} 6^{7}	7; 5
5	(Mexico) (China)	Rodrigo Pacheco Méndez; Te Rigele				not played

=== Pakistan vs. Indonesia ===
Pakistan
5
Pakistan Sports Complex, Islamabad
16–17 September 2023
Grass

Indonesia
0

			1	2	3
1	(Pakistan) (Indonesia)	Aqeel Khan; Gunawan Trismuwantara	7; 5	6; 3
2	(Pakistan) (Indonesia)	Aisam-ul-Haq Qureshi; David Agung Susanto	6; 1	6; 4
3	(Pakistan) (Indonesia)	Aqeel Khan / Aisam-ul-Haq Qureshi; Anthony Susanto / David Agung Susanto	3; 6	7; 5	6; 2
4	(Pakistan) (Indonesia)	Aqeel Khan; David Agung Susanto				w/o
5	(Pakistan) (Indonesia)	Muhammad Shoaib; Gunawan Trismuwantara	7^{7} 6^{4}	6; 4

=== Uruguay vs. Egypt ===
Uruguay
1
Carrasco Lawn Tennis Club, Montevideo
16–17 September 2023
Clay

Egypt
3

			1	2	3
1	(Uruguay) (Egypt)	Ignacio Carou; Mohamed Safwat	5; 7	3; 6
2	(Uruguay) (Egypt)	Franco Roncadelli; Karim-Mohamed Maamoun	1; 6	6; 4	5; 7
3	(Uruguay) (Egypt)	Ariel Behar / Martín Cuevas; Akram El Sallaly / Mohamed Safwat	3; 6	4; 6
4	(Uruguay) (Egypt)	Joaquín Aguilar; Amr Elsayed	4; 6	6; 0	10; 4
5	(Uruguay) (Egypt)	Ignacio Carou; Karim-Mohamed Maamoun				not played

=== Lebanon vs. Jamaica ===
Lebanon
4
Automobile and Touring Club of Lebanon, Beirut
15–16 September 2023
Clay

Jamaica
0

			1	2	3
1	(Lebanon) (Jamaica)	Benjamin Hassan; Rowland Phillips	7; 5	6; 3
2	(Lebanon) (Jamaica)	Hady Habib; Blaise Bicknell	7^{7} 6^{5}	6; 1
3	(Lebanon) (Jamaica)	Hady Habib / Benjamin Hassan; Blaise Bicknell / Rowland Phillips	6; 2	3; 6	6; 3
4	(Lebanon) (Jamaica)	Mustapha El Natour; Daniel Azar	6; 3	6; 1
5	(Lebanon) (Jamaica)	Hady Habib; Rowland Phillips				not played

=== Slovenia vs. Luxembourg ===
Slovenia
2
Tenis Center Tivoli, Ljubljana
15–16 September 2023
Clay

Luxembourg
3

			1	2	3
1	(Slovenia) (Luxembourg)	Bor Artnak; Alex Knaff	6; 3	6^{5} 7^{7}	2; 6
2	(Slovenia) (Luxembourg)	Blaž Rola; Chris Rodesch	7^{7} 6^{3}	6; 2
3	(Slovenia) (Luxembourg)	Sebastian Dominko / Blaž Rola; Alex Knaff / Chris Rodesch	5; 7	4; 6
4	(Slovenia) (Luxembourg)	Blaž Rola; Alex Knaff	6; 4	6; 2
5	(Slovenia) (Luxembourg)	Bor Artnak; Chris Rodesch	2; 6	6^{3} 7^{7}

=== Georgia vs. Tunisia ===
Georgia
3
Garikula Tennis Club, Kaspi
15–16 September 2023
Hard

Tunisia
1

			1	2	3
1	(Georgia (country)) (Tunisia)	Saba Purtseladze; Moez Echargui	6; 1	6; 4
2	(Georgia (country)) (Tunisia)	Zura Tkemaladze; Aziz Dougaz	3; 6	7^{11} 6^{9}	6; 4
3	(Georgia (country)) (Tunisia)	Aleksandre Bakshi / Aleksandre Metreveli; Skander Mansouri / Aziz Ouakaa	6; 4	6^{5} 7^{7}	2; 6
4	(Georgia (country)) (Tunisia)	Saba Purtseladze; Aziz Dougaz	6; 3	6; 4
5	(Georgia (country)) (Tunisia)	Zura Tkemaladze; Moez Echargui				not played

=== El Salvador vs. Ireland ===
El Salvador
1
Complejo de Tenis, Sonsonate
16–17 September 2023
Clay

Ireland
4

			1	2	3
1	(El Salvador) (Republic of Ireland)	César Cruz; Conor Gannon	1; 6	0; 6
2	(El Salvador) (Republic of Ireland)	Marcelo Arévalo; Osgar O'Hoisin	7^{7} 6^{5}	6; 1
3	(El Salvador) (Republic of Ireland)	Marcelo Arévalo / Lluis Miralles; Conor Gannon / David O'Hare	2; 6	3; 6
4	(El Salvador) (Republic of Ireland)	Diego Durán; Osgar O'Hoisin	3; 6	2; 6
5	(El Salvador) (Republic of Ireland)	José Flores; Freddy Murray	0; 6	0; 6

=== Hong Kong vs. Latvia ===
Hong Kong
2
Victoria Park Tennis Stadium, Hong Kong
16–17 September 2023
Hard

Latvia
3

			1	2	3
1	(Hong Kong) (Latvia)	Wong Hong-kit; Robert Strombachs	3; 6	6; 4	3; 6
2	(Hong Kong) (Latvia)	Coleman Wong; Mārtiņš Rocēns	6; 4	6; 2
3	(Hong Kong) (Latvia)	Coleman Wong / Wong Hong-kit; Miķelis Lībietis / Robert Strombachs	3; 6	6; 2	5; 7
4	(Hong Kong) (Latvia)	Coleman Wong; Robert Strombachs	4; 6	6^{6} 7^{8}
5	(Hong Kong) (Latvia)	Ng Ki-lung; Daniels Tens	7; 5	6; 2

=== Poland vs. Barbados ===
Poland
4
Akademia Tenis Kozerki, Grodzisk Mazowiecki
15–16 September 2023
Hard

Barbados
0

			1	2	3
1	(Poland) (Barbados)	Hubert Hurkacz; Kaipo Marshall	6; 0	7; 5
2	(Poland) (Barbados)	Olaf Pieczkowski; Darian King	1; 6	7^{7} 6^{5}	6; 3
3	(Poland) (Barbados)	Karol Drzewiecki / Jan Zieliński; Darian King / Haydn Lewis	6; 4	6; 4
4	(Poland) (Barbados)	Tomasz Berkieta; Xavier Lawrence	6; 3	6; 4
5	(Poland) (Barbados)	Olaf Pieczkowski; Kaipo Marshall				not played
