= 2023 Davis Cup World Group I play-offs =

The 2023 Davis Cup World Group I play-offs were held from 3 to 5 February 2023. The twelve winners of this round qualified for the 2023 Davis Cup World Group I while the twelve losers qualified for the 2023 Davis Cup World Group II.

== Teams ==
Twenty-four teams will play for twelve spots in the World Group I, in series decided on a home and away basis.

These twenty-four teams are:

- 12 losing teams from World Group I.
- 12 winning teams from World Group II.

The 12 winning teams from the play-offs will qualify for the World Group I and the 12 losing teams will qualify for the World Group II.

#: Nations Ranking as of 28 November 2022.

Qualified teams

- Japan (#20)
- Ecuador (#23)
- Brazil (#25)
- India (#26)
- Romania (#32)
- Israel (#34)
- Peru (#35)
- Mexico (#36)
- Ukraine (#37)
- Turkey (#38)
- Pakistan (#39)
- New Zealand (#41)

- Lebanon (#43)
- Lithuania (#44)
- Denmark (#45)
- Chinese Taipei (#47)
- Slovenia (#48)
- Poland (#49)
- Greece (#51)
- Latvia (#55)
- Bulgaria (#56)
- Ireland (#63)
- China (#70)
- Thailand (#72)

== Results summary ==
Home team	Score	Away team	Location	Venue	Surface
Japan [1]	4–0	Poland	Miki	Bourbon Beans Dome	Hard (i)
Greece	3–1	Ecuador [2]	Athens	Olympic Sports Complex	Hard (i)
Brazil [3]	4–0	China	Florianópolis	Estádio de Tênis Guga Kuerten	Clay
Denmark	3–2	India [4]	Hillerød	Royal Stage	Hard (i)
Thailand	2–3	Romania [5]	Nonthaburi	Lawn Tennis Association	Hard
Latvia	2–3	Israel [6]	Riga	Arena Riga	Hard (i)
Peru [7]	4–0	Ireland	Lima	Estadio Asia	Clay
Mexico [8]	1–3	Chinese Taipei	Metepec	Club Deportivo la Asunción	Clay
Ukraine [9]	3–1	Lebanon	Leszno (Poland)	Leszno Tennis Club	Hard (i)
Turkey [10]	4–0	Slovenia	Istanbul	Enka Spor Kulübü	Hard (i)
Lithuania	4–0	Pakistan [11]	Vilnius	SEB Arena	Hard (i)
New Zealand [12]	1–3	Bulgaria	Christchurch	Wilding Park	Hard

== Results ==
=== Japan vs. Poland ===
Japan
4
Bourbon Beans Dome, Miki, Japan
4–5 February 2023
Hard (i)

Poland
0

			1	2	3
1	(Japan) (Poland)	Yoshihito Nishioka; Daniel Michalski	6; 3	6; 2
2	(Japan) (Poland)	Taro Daniel; Kacper Żuk	6; 3	6; 4
3	(Japan) (Poland)	Ben McLachlan / Yosuke Watanuki; Łukasz Kubot / Jan Zieliński	4; 6	7; 5	7^{7} 6^{2}
4	(Japan) (Poland)	Kaichi Uchida; Maks Kaśnikowski	6; 2	7; 5
5	(Japan) (Poland)	Taro Daniel; Daniel Michalski				not played

=== Greece vs. Ecuador ===
Greece
3
O.A.C.A. Olympic Indoor Hall, Athens, Greece
4–5 February 2023
Hard (i)

Ecuador
1

			1	2	3
1	(Greece) (Ecuador)	Stefanos Tsitsipas; Álvaro Guillén Meza	7; 5	6; 2
2	(Greece) (Ecuador)	Aristotelis Thanos; Andrés Andrade	7^{7} 6^{4}	6; 4
3	(Greece) (Ecuador)	Alexandros Skorilas / Petros Tsitsipas; Gonzalo Escobar / Diego Hidalgo	6^{4} 7^{7}	4; 6
4	(Greece) (Ecuador)	Stefanos Tsitsipas; Andrés Andrade	7^{7} 6^{1}	6; 1
5	(Greece) (Ecuador)	Aristotelis Thanos; Álvaro Guillén Meza				not played

=== Brazil vs. China ===
Brazil
4
Estádio de Tênis Guga Kuerten, Florianópolis, Brazil
3–4 February 2023
Clay

China
0

			1	2	3
1	(Brazil) (China)	Matheus Pucinelli de Almeida; Te Rigele	6; 1	6; 2
2	(Brazil) (China)	Thiago Monteiro; Cui Jie	6; 3	6; 4
3	(Brazil) (China)	Rafael Matos / Felipe Meligeni Alves; Cui Jie / Zhang Ze	6; 2	6; 3
4	(Brazil) (China)	Gustavo Heide; Te Rigele	3; 0			retired
5	(Brazil) (China)	Matheus Pucinelli de Almeida; Cui Jie				not played

=== Denmark vs. India ===
Denmark
3
Royal Stage, Hillerød, Denmark
3–4 February 2023
Hard (i)

India
2

			1	2	3
1	(Denmark) (India)	Holger Rune; Yuki Bhambri	6; 2	6; 2
2	(Denmark) (India)	August Holmgren; Sumit Nagal	6; 4	3; 6	4; 6
3	(Denmark) (India)	Johannes Ingildsen / Holger Rune; Yuki Bhambri / Rohan Bopanna	6; 2	6; 4
4	(Denmark) (India)	Holger Rune; Sumit Nagal	7; 5	6; 3
5	(Denmark) (India)	Elmer Møller; Prajnesh Gunneswaran	4; 6	6^{1} 7^{7}

=== Thailand vs. Romania ===
Thailand
2
Lawn Tennis Association, Nonthaburi, Thailand
3–4 February 2023
Hard

Romania
3

			1	2	3
1	(Thailand) (Romania)	Yuttana Charoenphon; Nicholas David Ionel	7; 5	3; 6	6; 1
2	(Thailand) (Romania)	Kasidit Samrej; Filip Cristian Jianu	4; 6	7^{7} 6^{5}	2; 6
3	(Thailand) (Romania)	Pruchya Isaro / Thantub Suksumrarn; Marius Copil / Victor Vlad Cornea	4; 6	6; 2	6; 4
4	(Thailand) (Romania)	Kasidit Samrej; Nicholas David Ionel	4; 6	1; 6
5	(Thailand) (Romania)	Yuttana Charoenphon; Filip Cristian Jianu	0; 6	2; 6

=== Latvia vs. Israel ===
Latvia
2
Arena Riga, Riga, Latvia
4–5 February 2023
Hard (i)

Israel
3

			1	2	3
1	(Latvia) (Israel)	Kārlis Ozoliņš; Edan Leshem	6; 0	6; 3
2	(Latvia) (Israel)	Ernests Gulbis; Daniel Cukierman	6; 1	2; 6	7^{7} 6^{2}
3	(Latvia) (Israel)	Ernests Gulbis / Kārlis Ozoliņš; Daniel Cukierman / Edan Leshem	3; 6	3; 6
4	(Latvia) (Israel)	Robert Strombachs; Yshai Oliel	1; 6	4; 6
5	(Latvia) (Israel)	Kārlis Ozoliņš; Daniel Cukierman	7^{7} 6^{5}	2; 6	4; 6

=== Peru vs. Ireland ===
Peru
4
Estadio Asia, Lima, Peru
3–4 February 2023
Clay

Ireland
0

			1	2	3
1	(Peru) (Republic of Ireland)	Gonzalo Bueno; Simon Carr	6; 1	6; 1
2	(Peru) (Republic of Ireland)	Arklon Huertas del Pino; Osgar O'Hoisin	6; 2	6; 3
3	(Peru) (Republic of Ireland)	Ignacio Buse / Jorge Panta; Simon Carr / Jack Molloy	6; 2	7^{7} 6^{4}
4	(Peru) (Republic of Ireland)	Conner Huertas del Pino; Michael Agwi	6; 3	6; 4
5	(Peru) (Republic of Ireland)	Gonzalo Bueno; Osgar O'Hoisin				not played

=== Mexico vs. Chinese Taipei ===
Mexico
1
Club Deportivo la Asunción, Metepec, Mexico
4–5 February 2023
Clay

Chinese Taipei
3

			1	2	3
1	(Mexico) (Chinese Taipei)	César Ramírez; Tseng Chun-hsin	4; 6	3; 6
2	(Mexico) (Chinese Taipei)	Alan Fernando Rubio Fierros; Hsu Yu-hsiou	5; 7	3; 6
3	(Mexico) (Chinese Taipei)	Isaac Arturo Arévalo / César Ramírez; Hsu Yu-hsiou / Tseng Chun-hsin	6^{4} 7^{7}	4; 6
4	(Mexico) (Chinese Taipei)	Luciano Alcocer; Huang Tsung-hao	6; 3	6; 3
5	(Mexico) (Chinese Taipei)	César Ramírez; Hsu Yu-hsiou				not played

=== Ukraine vs. Lebanon ===
Ukraine
3
Leszno Tennis Club, Leszno, Poland
3–4 February 2023
Hard (i)

Lebanon
1

			1	2	3
1	(Ukraine) (Lebanon)	Vladyslav Orlov; Hady Habib	6; 4	6; 2
2	(Ukraine) (Lebanon)	Viacheslav Bielinskyi; Benjamin Hassan	6; 4	2; 6	6; 4
3	(Ukraine) (Lebanon)	Illya Beloborodko / Vladyslav Manafov; Benjamin Hassan / Hasan Ibrahim	6; 4	6; 3
4	(Ukraine) (Lebanon)	Oleksandr Ovcharenko; Benjamin Hassan	5; 7	6^{1} 7^{7}
5	(Ukraine) (Lebanon)	Viacheslav Bielinskyi; Hady Habib				not played

=== Turkey vs. Slovenia ===
Turkey
4
Enka Spor Kulübü, Istanbul, Turkey
3–4 February 2023
Hard (i)

Slovenia
0

			1	2	3
1	(Turkey) (Slovenia)	Altuğ Çelikbilek; Sebastian Dominko	6; 2	6; 3
2	(Turkey) (Slovenia)	Cem İlkel; Bor Artnak	6; 2	7^{7} 6^{5}
3	(Turkey) (Slovenia)	Altuğ Çelikbilek / Cem İlkel; Sebastian Dominko / Blaž Rola	7; 5	4; 6	6; 4
4	(Turkey) (Slovenia)	Ergi Kırkın; Matic Križnik	6; 2	6; 2
5	(Turkey) (Slovenia)	Cem İlkel; Sebastian Dominko				not played

=== Lithuania vs. Pakistan ===
Lithuania
4
SEB Arena, Vilnius, Lithuania
3–4 February 2023
Hard (i)

Pakistan
0

			1	2	3
1	(Lithuania) (Pakistan)	Ričardas Berankis; Muhammad Shoaib	6; 0	6; 2
2	(Lithuania) (Pakistan)	Edas Butvilas; Aqeel Khan	6; 1	6; 0
3	(Lithuania) (Pakistan)	Tadas Babelis / Vilius Gaubas; Aqeel Khan / Aisam-ul-Haq Qureshi	1; 6	6; 2	6; 2
4	(Lithuania) (Pakistan)	Vilius Gaubas; Muhammad Abid	6; 2	6; 2
5	(Lithuania) (Pakistan)	Edas Butvilas; Muhammad Shoaib				not played

=== New Zealand vs. Bulgaria ===
New Zealand
1
Wilding Park, Christchurch, New Zealand
4–5 February 2023
Hard

Bulgaria
3

			1	2	3
1	(New Zealand) (Bulgaria)	Ajeet Rai; Alexandar Lazarov	6^{1} 7^{7}	2; 6
2	(New Zealand) (Bulgaria)	Kiranpal Pannu; Dimitar Kuzmanov	7; 5	3; 6	2; 6
3	(New Zealand) (Bulgaria)	Artem Sitak / Michael Venus; Alexander Donski / Petr Nesterov	6; 4	3; 6	6; 3
4	(New Zealand) (Bulgaria)	Ajeet Rai; Dimitar Kuzmanov	3; 6	7; 5	4; 6
5	(New Zealand) (Bulgaria)	Rubin Statham; Alexandar Lazarov				not played
