= 2023 Davis Cup qualifying round =

The 2023 Davis Cup qualifying round was held from 3 to 5 February 2023. The twelve winners of this round qualified for the 2023 Davis Cup Finals while the twelve losers qualified for the 2023 Davis Cup World Group I.

== Teams ==
Twenty-four teams will play for twelve spots in the finals, in series decided on a home and away basis.

These twenty-four teams are:

- 12 teams ranked 3rd–16th in the 2022 Finals except the 2 wild card teams
- 12 winning teams from the 2022 World Group I

The 12 winning teams from the qualifying round will play at the Finals and the 12 losing teams will play at the World Group I.

#: Nations Ranking as of 28 November 2022.

Qualified teams

Seeded teams

1. Croatia (#1)
2. France (#3)
3. United States (#5)
4. Germany (#6)
5. Great Britain (#9)
6. Serbia (#10)
7. Kazakhstan (#11)
8. Belgium (#12)
9. Sweden (#13)
10. Netherlands (#14)
11. Argentina (#15)
12. Czech Republic (#17)

Unseeded teams

- Austria (#18)
- Colombia (#19)
- Chile (#21)
- South Korea (#22)
- Hungary (#24)
- Slovakia (#27)
- Finland (#28)
- Bosnia and Herzegovina (#29)
- Uzbekistan (#30)
- Norway (#31)
- Portugal (#33)
- Switzerland (#40)

== Results summary ==
Home team	Score	Away team	Location	Venue	Surface
Croatia [1]	3–1	Austria	Rijeka	Centar Zamet	Hard (i)
Hungary	2–3	France [2]	Tatabánya	Multifunctional Arena	Hard (i)
Uzbekistan	0–4	United States [3]	Tashkent	Olympic Tennis School	Hard (i)
Germany [4]	2–3	Switzerland	Trier	Trier Arena	Hard (i)
Colombia	1–3	Great Britain [5]	Cota	Pueblo Viejo Country Club	Clay (i)
Norway	0–4	Serbia [6]	Oslo	Oslo Tennisarena	Hard (i)
Chile	3–1	Kazakhstan [7]	La Serena	Campus Trentino	Clay
South Korea	3–2	Belgium [8]	Seoul	Olympic Tennis Court	Hard (i)
Sweden [9]	3–1	Bosnia and Herzegovina	Stockholm	Royal Tennis Hall	Hard (i)
Netherlands [10]	4–0	Slovakia	Groningen	MartiniPlaza	Hard (i)
Finland	3–1	Argentina [11]	Espoo	Espoo Metro Areena	Hard (i)
Portugal	1–3	Czech Republic [12]	Maia	Complexo Municipal de Ténis	Clay (i)

== Results ==
=== Croatia vs. Austria ===
Croatia
3
Centar Zamet, Rijeka, Croatia
4–5 February 2023
Hard (i)

Austria
1

			1	2	3
1	(Croatia) (Austria)	Borna Ćorić; Dennis Novak	6; 3	7; 5
2	(Croatia) (Austria)	Borna Gojo; Dominic Thiem	6; 3	7^{7} 6^{2}
3	(Croatia) (Austria)	Ivan Dodig / Nikola Mektić; Alexander Erler / Lucas Miedler	3; 6	6^{11} 7^{13}
4	(Croatia) (Austria)	Borna Ćorić; Dominic Thiem	7^{7} 6^{3}	6; 2
5	(Croatia) (Austria)	Borna Gojo; Dennis Novak				not played

=== Hungary vs. France ===
Hungary
2
Multifunctional Arena, Tatabánya, Hungary
3–4 February 2023
Hard (i)

France
3

			1	2	3
1	(Hungary) (France)	Zsombor Piros; Benjamin Bonzi	7^{7} 6^{4}	6; 3
2	(Hungary) (France)	Márton Fucsovics; Ugo Humbert	3; 6	2; 6
3	(Hungary) (France)	Fábián Marozsán / Máté Valkusz; Nicolas Mahut / Arthur Rinderknech	6; 2	7^{7} 6^{4}
4	(Hungary) (France)	Márton Fucsovics; Adrian Mannarino	6^{6} 7^{8}	2; 6
5	(Hungary) (France)	Fábián Marozsán; Ugo Humbert	3; 6	3; 6

=== Uzbekistan vs. United States ===
Uzbekistan
0
Olympic Tennis School, Tashkent, Uzbekistan
3–4 February 2023
Hard (i)

United States
4

			1	2	3
1	(Uzbekistan) (United States)	Sergey Fomin; Mackenzie McDonald	4; 6	1; 6
2	(Uzbekistan) (United States)	Khumoyun Sultanov; Tommy Paul	1; 6	6^{6} 7^{8}
3	(Uzbekistan) (United States)	Sanjar Fayziev / Sergey Fomin; Austin Krajicek / Rajeev Ram	2; 6	4; 6
4	(Uzbekistan) (United States)	Amir Milushev; Denis Kudla	4; 6	4; 6
5	(Uzbekistan) (United States)	Khumoyun Sultanov; Mackenzie McDonald				not played

=== Germany vs. Switzerland ===
Germany
2
Trier Arena, Trier, Germany
3–4 February 2023
Hard (i)

Switzerland
3

			1	2	3
1	(Germany) (Switzerland)	Oscar Otte; Marc-Andrea Hüsler	6; 2	2; 6	4; 6
2	(Germany) (Switzerland)	Alexander Zverev; Stan Wawrinka	6; 4	6; 1
3	(Germany) (Switzerland)	Andreas Mies / Tim Pütz; Dominic Stricker / Stan Wawrinka	6^{3} 7^{7}	6; 3	6; 4
4	(Germany) (Switzerland)	Alexander Zverev; Marc-Andrea Hüsler	2; 6	6^{4} 7^{7}
5	(Germany) (Switzerland)	Daniel Altmaier; Stan Wawrinka	3; 6	7; 5	4; 6

=== Colombia vs. Great Britain ===
Colombia
1
Pueblo Viejo Country Club, Cota, Colombia
3–4 February 2023
Clay (i)

Great Britain
3

			1	2	3
1	(Colombia) (United Kingdom)	Nicolás Mejía; Dan Evans	6; 2	2; 6	6; 4
2	(Colombia) (United Kingdom)	Nicolás Barrientos; Cameron Norrie	2; 6	5; 7
3	(Colombia) (United Kingdom)	Juan Sebastián Cabal / Robert Farah; Dan Evans / Neal Skupski	4; 6	4; 6
4	(Colombia) (United Kingdom)	Nicolás Mejía; Cameron Norrie	4; 6	4; 6
5	(Colombia) (United Kingdom)	Nicolás Barrientos; Dan Evans				not played

=== Norway vs. Serbia ===
Norway
0
Oslo Tennisarena, Oslo, Norway
3–4 February 2023
Hard (i)

Serbia
4

			1	2	3
1	(Norway) (Serbia)	Andreja Petrovic; Miomir Kecmanović	1; 6	3; 6
2	(Norway) (Serbia)	Viktor Durasovic; Laslo Đere	3; 6	6; 4	6^{8} 7^{10}
3	(Norway) (Serbia)	Viktor Durasovic / Herman Høyeraal; Nikola Ćaćić / Filip Krajinović	4; 6	6; 3	3; 6
4	(Norway) (Serbia)	Viktor Durasovic; Hamad Međedović	4; 6	7^{7} 6^{4}	4; 10
5	(Norway) (Serbia)	Andreja Petrovic; Laslo Đere				not played

=== Chile vs. Kazakhstan ===
Chile
3
Campus Trentino, La Serena, Chile
4–5 February 2023
Clay

Kazakhstan
1

			1	2	3
1	(Chile) (Kazakhstan)	Cristian Garín; Timofey Skatov	1; 6	3; 6
2	(Chile) (Kazakhstan)	Nicolás Jarry; Alexander Bublik	6; 2	6; 2
3	(Chile) (Kazakhstan)	Tomás Barrios Vera / Alejandro Tabilo; Andrey Golubev / Aleksandr Nedovyesov	6; 4	7; 5
4	(Chile) (Kazakhstan)	Cristian Garín; Alexander Bublik	6; 4	3; 6	6; 3
5	(Chile) (Kazakhstan)	Nicolás Jarry; Timofey Skatov				not played

=== South Korea vs. Belgium ===
South Korea
3
Olympic Tennis Court, Seoul, South Korea
4–5 February 2023
Hard (i)

Belgium
2

			1	2	3
1	(South Korea) (Belgium)	Kwon Soon-woo; Zizou Bergs	6; 1	4; 6	6^{6} 7^{8}
2	(South Korea) (Belgium)	Hong Seong-chan; David Goffin	4; 6	2; 6
3	(South Korea) (Belgium)	Nam Ji-sung / Song Min-kyu; Sander Gillé / Joran Vliegen	7^{7} 6^{3}	7^{7} 6^{5}
4	(South Korea) (Belgium)	Kwon Soon-woo; David Goffin	3; 6	6; 1	6; 3
5	(South Korea) (Belgium)	Hong Seong-chan; Zizou Bergs	6; 3	7^{7} 6^{4}

=== Sweden vs. Bosnia and Herzegovina ===
Sweden
3
Royal Tennis Hall, Stockholm, Sweden
3–4 February 2023
Hard (i)

Bosnia and Herzegovina
1

			1	2	3
1	(Sweden) (Bosnia and Herzegovina)	Mikael Ymer; Mirza Bašić	6; 4	7; 5
2	(Sweden) (Bosnia and Herzegovina)	Elias Ymer; Damir Džumhur	6; 1	6; 4
3	(Sweden) (Bosnia and Herzegovina)	André Göransson / Elias Ymer; Mirza Bašić / Tomislav Brkić	4; 6	2; 6
4	(Sweden) (Bosnia and Herzegovina)	Mikael Ymer; Damir Džumhur	6; 1	1; 6	6; 3
5	(Sweden) (Bosnia and Herzegovina)	Elias Ymer; Mirza Bašić				not played

=== Netherlands vs. Slovakia ===
Netherlands
4
MartiniPlaza, Groningen, Netherlands
4–5 February 2023
Hard (i)

Slovakia
0

			1	2	3
1	(Netherlands) (Slovakia)	Tallon Griekspoor; Lukáš Klein	7^{8} 6^{6}	2; 6	6; 4
2	(Netherlands) (Slovakia)	Tim van Rijthoven; Alex Molčan	7^{8} 6^{6}	5; 7	6; 3
3	(Netherlands) (Slovakia)	Wesley Koolhof / Matwé Middelkoop; Lukáš Klein / Alex Molčan	6; 3	6; 3
4	(Netherlands) (Slovakia)	Matwé Middelkoop; Jozef Kovalík	6; 4	6; 4
5	(Netherlands) (Slovakia)	Tim van Rijthoven; Lukáš Klein				not played

=== Finland vs. Argentina ===
Finland
3
Espoo Metro Areena, Espoo, Finland
4–5 February 2023
Hard (i)

Argentina
1

			1	2	3
1	(Finland) (Argentina)	Emil Ruusuvuori; Pedro Cachin	7; 5	6; 3
2	(Finland) (Argentina)	Otto Virtanen; Francisco Cerúndolo	3; 6	6; 3	6^{3} 7^{7}
3	(Finland) (Argentina)	Harri Heliövaara / Emil Ruusuvuori; Máximo González / Andrés Molteni	7^{7} 6^{5}	4; 6	6; 4
4	(Finland) (Argentina)	Emil Ruusuvuori; Facundo Bagnis	7; 5	6; 1
5	(Finland) (Argentina)	Otto Virtanen; Pedro Cachin				not played

=== Portugal vs. Czech Republic ===
Portugal
1
Complexo Municipal de Ténis, Maia, Portugal
4–5 February 2023
Clay (i)

Czech Republic
3

			1	2	3
1	(Portugal) (Czech Republic)	Nuno Borges; Jiří Lehečka	4; 6	4; 6
2	(Portugal) (Czech Republic)	João Sousa; Tomáš Macháč	6^{6} 7^{8}	6; 3	2; 6
3	(Portugal) (Czech Republic)	Nuno Borges / Francisco Cabral; Tomáš Macháč / Adam Pavlásek	7; 5	7^{7} 6^{4}
4	(Portugal) (Czech Republic)	João Sousa; Jiří Lehečka	4; 6	1; 6
5	(Portugal) (Czech Republic)	Nuno Borges; Tomáš Macháč				not played
