= 2023 Davis Cup World Group II play-offs =

The 2023 Davis Cup World Group II play-offs were held from 2 to 6 February 2023. The twelve winners of this round qualified for the 2023 Davis Cup World Group II while the twelve losers will play at the Group III of the corresponding continental zone.

== Teams ==
Twenty-four teams will play for twelve spots in the World Group II, in series decided on a home and away basis.

These twenty-four teams are:

- 12 losing teams from World Group II.
- 12 teams from their Group III zone:
  - 3 from Europe
  - 3 from Asia/Oceania,
  - 3 from Americas, and
  - 3 from Africa.

The 12 winning teams from the play-offs will qualify for the World Group II and the 12 losing teams will play at the Group III of the corresponding continental zone.

#: Nations Ranking as of 28 November 2022.

Qualified teams

- Uruguay (#42)
- Bolivia (#46)
- Tunisia (#50)
- South Africa (#52)
- Barbados (#53)
- Dominican Republic (#54)
- Hong Kong (#57)
- El Salvador (#58)
- Estonia (#59)
- Egypt (#60)
- Morocco (#61)
- Indonesia (#62)

- Paraguay (#64)
- Monaco (#65)
- Venezuela (#66)
- Zimbabwe (#67)
- Vietnam (#68)
- Jamaica (#69)
- Pacific Oceania (#71)
- Georgia (#73)
- Cyprus (#74)
- Luxembourg (#76)
- Jordan (#77)
- Ivory Coast (#84)

== Results summary ==
Home team	Score	Away team	Location	Venue	Surface
Zimbabwe	2–3	Uruguay [1]	Harare	Harare Sports Club	Hard
Georgia	4–0	Bolivia [2]	Leszno (Poland)	Leszno Tennis Club	Hard (i)
Tunisia [3]	3–2	Cyprus	Tunis	Cité Nationale Sportive El Menzah	Hard
Luxembourg	4–1	South Africa [4]	Esch-sur-Alzette	Centre National de Tennis	Hard (i)
Barbados [5]	3–2	Pacific Oceania	Bridgetown	National Tennis Centre	Hard
Monaco	4–0	Dominican Republic [6]	Roquebrune-Cap-Martin (France)	Monte Carlo Country Club	Clay
Venezuela	1–3	Hong Kong [7]	Puerto Cabello	Centro Nacional de Tenis	Hard
Jordan	1–3	El Salvador [8]	Amman	Jordan Tennis Federation Courts	Hard (i)
Jamaica	3–2	Estonia [9]	Kingston	Eric Bell National Tennis Centre	Hard
Egypt [10]	3–2	Paraguay	Cairo	Gezira Sporting Club	Clay
Ivory Coast	1–3	Morocco [11]	Abidjan	Le Central Tennis Club	Hard
Vietnam	2–3	Indonesia [12]	Từ Sơn	Hanaka Paris Ocean Park	Hard

== Results ==
=== Zimbabwe vs. Uruguay ===
Zimbabwe
2
Harare Sports Club, Harare, Zimbabwe
3–6 February 2023
Hard

Uruguay
3

			1	2	3
1	(Zimbabwe) (Uruguay)	Courtney John Lock; Martín Cuevas	3; 6	2; 6
2	(Zimbabwe) (Uruguay)	Benjamin Lock; Ignacio Carou	7^{7} 6^{5}	6; 4
3	(Zimbabwe) (Uruguay)	Benjamin Lock / Courtney John Lock; Ariel Behar / Martín Cuevas	2; 6	4; 6
4	(Zimbabwe) (Uruguay)	Benjamin Lock; Martín Cuevas	6; 4	6; 4
5	(Zimbabwe) (Uruguay)	Courtney John Lock; Ignacio Carou	3; 6	6; 3	4; 6

=== Georgia vs. Bolivia ===
Georgia
4
Leszno Tennis Club, Leszno, Poland
2–3 February 2023
Hard (i)

Bolivia
0

			1	2	3
1	(Georgia (country)) (Bolivia)	Aleksandre Bakshi; Juan Carlos Prado Ángelo	7^{7} 6^{1}	6; 1
2	(Georgia (country)) (Bolivia)	Zura Tkemaladze; Raúl García	6; 2	6; 1
3	(Georgia (country)) (Bolivia)	Aleksandre Bakshi / Aleksandre Metreveli; Agustín Eduardo Cuellar / Santiago Navarro	6; 3	6; 2
4	(Georgia (country)) (Bolivia)	Saba Purtseladze; Juan Carlos Prado Ángelo	6^{3} 7^{7}	6; 2	10; 7
5	(Georgia (country)) (Bolivia)	Aleksandre Bakshi; Raúl García				not played

=== Tunisia vs. Cyprus ===
Tunisia
3
Cité Nationale Sportive El Menzah, Tunis, Tunisia
3–4 February 2023
Hard

Cyprus
2

			1	2	3
1	(Tunisia) (Cyprus)	Skander Mansouri; Petros Chrysochos	4; 6	6^{4} 7^{7}
2	(Tunisia) (Cyprus)	Moez Echargui; Menelaos Efstathiou	6; 1	3; 6	6; 2
3	(Tunisia) (Cyprus)	Aziz Dougaz / Skander Mansouri; Sergis Kyratzis / Eleftherios Neos	6; 2	4; 6	6; 2
4	(Tunisia) (Cyprus)	Aziz Dougaz; Menelaos Efstathiou	6; 3	1; 6	4; 6
5	(Tunisia) (Cyprus)	Moez Echargui; Petros Chrysochos	7^{7} 6^{5}	7; 5

=== Luxembourg vs. South Africa ===
Luxembourg
4
Centre National de Tennis, Esch-sur-Alzette, Luxembourg
4–5 February 2023
Hard (i)

South Africa
1

			1	2	3
1	(Luxembourg) (South Africa)	Alex Knaff; Alec Beckley	4; 6	6; 3	6; 3
2	(Luxembourg) (South Africa)	Chris Rodesch; Kris van Wyk	6; 4	6; 4
3	(Luxembourg) (South Africa)	Alex Knaff / Chris Rodesch; Alec Beckley / Raven Klaasen	4; 6	7; 5	3; 6
4	(Luxembourg) (South Africa)	Alex Knaff; Kris van Wyk	3; 6	6; 3	6; 4
5	(Luxembourg) (South Africa)	Raphaël Calzi; Devin Badenhorst	6; 4	7; 5

=== Barbados vs. Pacific Oceania ===
Barbados
3
National Tennis Centre, Bridgetown, Barbados
3–4 February 2023
Hard

Pacific Oceania
2

			1	2	3
1	(Barbados) (Pacific Oceania)	Darian King; Clément Mainguy	6; 4	6; 0
2	(Barbados) (Pacific Oceania)	Kaipo Marshall; Colin Sinclair	2; 6	1; 6
3	(Barbados) (Pacific Oceania)	Matthew Foster-Estwick / Darian King; Brett Baudinet / Colin Sinclair	6; 4	6^{4} 7^{7}	5; 7
4	(Barbados) (Pacific Oceania)	Darian King; Colin Sinclair	7^{8} 6^{6}	6; 3
5	(Barbados) (Pacific Oceania)	Kaipo Marshall; Clément Mainguy	4; 6	7; 5	6; 3

=== Monaco vs. Dominican Republic ===
Monaco
4
Monte Carlo Country Club, Roquebrune-Cap-Martin, France
4–5 February 2023
Clay

Dominican Republic
0

			1	2	3
1	(Monaco) (Dominican Republic)	Valentin Vacherot; Roberto Cid Subervi	6; 3	5; 7	6; 4
2	(Monaco) (Dominican Republic)	Lucas Catarina; Nick Hardt	6; 3	6; 4
3	(Monaco) (Dominican Republic)	Romain Arneodo / Hugo Nys; Roberto Cid Subervi / Nick Hardt	7^{7} 6^{1}	6; 3
4	(Monaco) (Dominican Republic)	Valentin Vacherot; Peter Bertran	6^{1} 7^{7}	6; 4	10; 8
5	(Monaco) (Dominican Republic)	Lucas Catarina; Roberto Cid Subervi				not played

=== Venezuela vs. Hong Kong ===
Venezuela
1
Centro Nacional de Tenis, Puerto Cabello, Venezuela
3–5 February 2023
Hard

Hong Kong
3

			1	2	3
1	(Venezuela) (Hong Kong)	Rafael Abdul Salam; Coleman Wong	2; 6	3; 6
2	(Venezuela) (Hong Kong)	Ricardo Rodríguez-Pace; Wong Hong-kit	6; 3	3; 6	6; 3
3	(Venezuela) (Hong Kong)	Brandon Pérez / Ricardo Rodríguez-Pace; Coleman Wong / Wong Hong-kit	1; 6	6^{3} 7^{7}
4	(Venezuela) (Hong Kong)	Ricardo Rodríguez-Pace; Coleman Wong	6; 2	1; 6	3; 6
5	(Venezuela) (Hong Kong)	Rafael Abdul Salam; Wong Hong-kit				not played

=== Jordan vs. El Salvador ===
Jordan
1
Jordan Tennis Federation Courts, Amman, Jordan
3–4 February 2023
Hard (i)

El Salvador
3

			1	2	3
1	(Jordan) (El Salvador)	Karam Hatamleh; Marcelo Arévalo	1; 6	4; 6
2	(Jordan) (El Salvador)	Mousa Alkotop; Diego Durán	7^{7} 6^{2}	4; 6	6; 2
3	(Jordan) (El Salvador)	Mohammad Alkotop / Mousa Alkotop; Marcelo Arévalo / Lluis Miralles	6^{2} 7^{7}	0; 6
4	(Jordan) (El Salvador)	Mousa Alkotop; Marcelo Arévalo	4; 6	6; 4	4; 6
5	(Jordan) (El Salvador)	Karam Hatamleh; Diego Durán				not played

=== Jamaica vs. Estonia ===
Jamaica
3
Eric Bell National Tennis Centre, Kingston, Jamaica
4–5 February 2023
Hard

Estonia
2

			1	2	3
1	(Jamaica) (Estonia)	Rowland Phillips; Kristjan Tamm	6; 1	6; 1
2	(Jamaica) (Estonia)	Blaise Bicknell; Kenneth Raisma	4; 6	6; 4	6; 0
3	(Jamaica) (Estonia)	Daniel Azar / John Chin; Kenneth Raisma / Jürgen Zopp	1; 6	2; 6
4	(Jamaica) (Estonia)	Blaise Bicknell; Kristjan Tamm	7^{9} 6^{7}			retired
5	(Jamaica) (Estonia)	Jacob Bicknell; Johannes Seeman	1; 6	0; 6

=== Egypt vs. Paraguay ===
Egypt
3
Gezira Sporting Club, Cairo, Egypt
3–4 February 2023
Clay

Paraguay
2

			1	2	3
1	(Egypt) (Paraguay)	Amr Elsayed; Hernando José Escurra Isnardi	6; 3	6; 3
2	(Egypt) (Paraguay)	Mohamed Safwat; Daniel Vallejo	1; 6	6; 0	4; 6
3	(Egypt) (Paraguay)	Karim-Mohamed Maamoun / Mohamed Safwat; Juan Borba / Daniel Vallejo	6; 3	6^{5} 7^{7}	6; 4
4	(Egypt) (Paraguay)	Amr Elsayed; Daniel Vallejo	1; 6	5; 7
5	(Egypt) (Paraguay)	Mohamed Safwat; Juan Borba	6; 1	6; 1

=== Ivory Coast vs. Morocco ===
Ivory Coast
1
Le Central Tennis Club, Abidjan, Ivory Coast
4–5 February 2023
Hard

Morocco
3

			1	2	3
1	(Ivory Coast) (Morocco)	Eliakim Coulibaly; Adam Moundir	5; 7	6; 4	5; 7
2	(Ivory Coast) (Morocco)	Myko Yohann Himad Kouame; Elliot Benchetrit	2; 6	4; 6
3	(Ivory Coast) (Morocco)	Eliakim Coulibaly / Gueninle Abdoul Karim Ouattara; Elliot Benchetrit / Younes Lalami Laaroussi	3; 6	4; 6
4	(Ivory Coast) (Morocco)	Felix Ange Romaric Boblei; Yassine Dlimi	4; 6	1; 0		retired
5	(Ivory Coast) (Morocco)	Gueninle Abdoul Karim Ouattara; Adam Moundir				not played

=== Vietnam vs. Indonesia ===
Vietnam
2
Hanaka Paris Ocean Park, Từ Sơn, Vietnam
4–5 February 2023
Hard

Indonesia
3

			1	2	3
1	(Vietnam) (Indonesia)	Phạm Minh Tuấn; Muhammad Rifqi Fitriadi	3; 6	1; 6
2	(Vietnam) (Indonesia)	Lý Hoàng Nam; Anthony Susanto	6; 0	6; 3
3	(Vietnam) (Indonesia)	Lý Hoàng Nam / Nguyễn Văn Phương; Muhammad Rifqi Fitriadi / Christopher Rungkat	3; 6	3; 6
4	(Vietnam) (Indonesia)	Lý Hoàng Nam; Muhammad Rifqi Fitriadi	6; 4	3; 6	7; 5
5	(Vietnam) (Indonesia)	Nguyễn Đắc Tiến; Christopher Rungkat	4; 6	0; 6
