= Leon Smith (tennis) =

British tennis coach

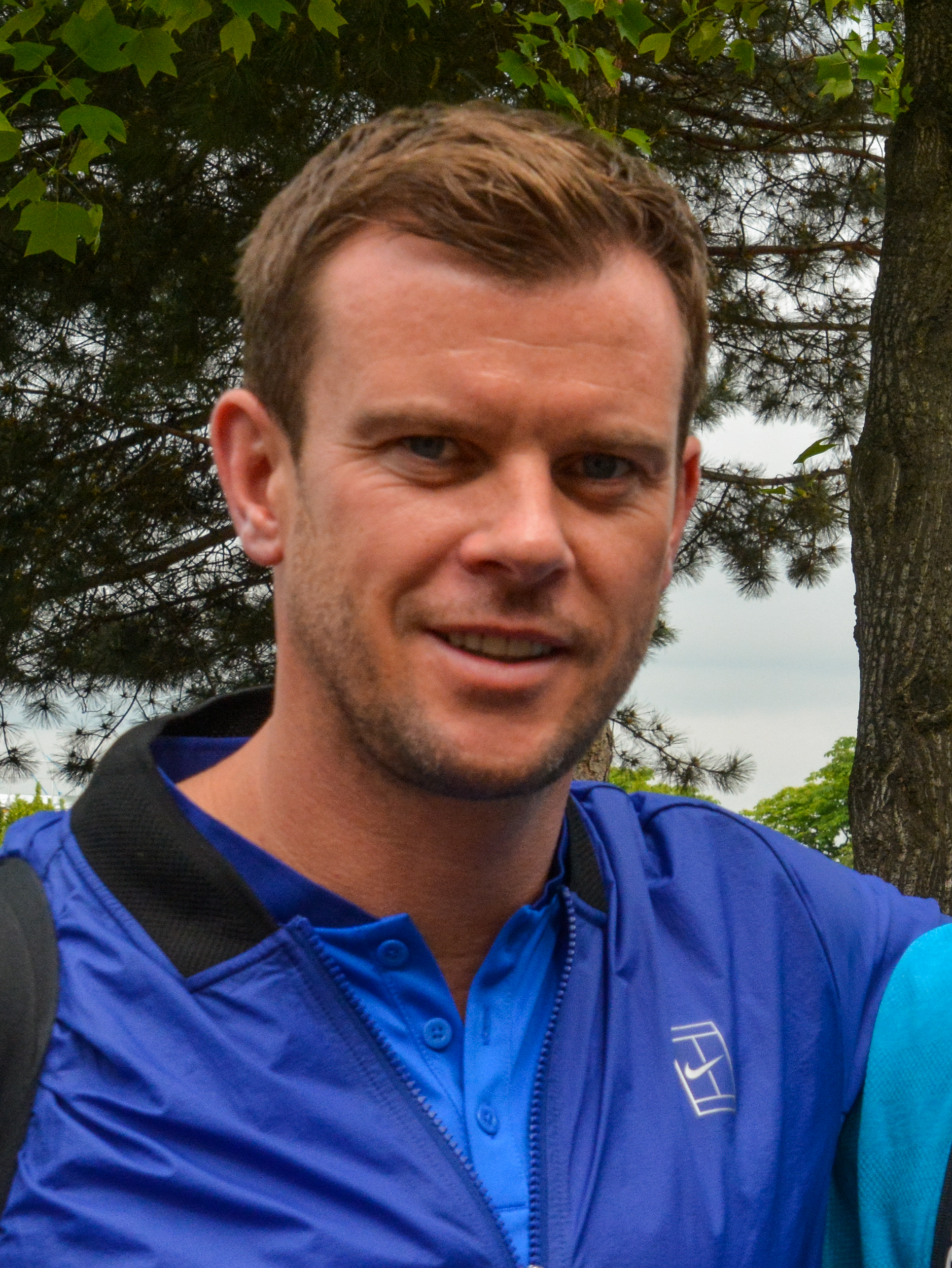
Smith at the 2016 French Open.

Leon Smith, OBE (born 1976) is a British tennis coach. Smith has been captain of the Great Britain Davis Cup team since 2010, and led the Great Britain team to win the 2015 Davis Cup.

== Early years ==
Smith was born in Glasgow, Scotland and attended Hutchesons' Grammar School. He played junior tennis at national level but did not become a professional player.

== Career ==
Smith began coaching professionally at club level aged 18. He has focused on elite players since 1998, and became national performance officer for Tennis Scotland that year. Two years later he helped set up a tennis academy at the Next Generation club in Edinburgh. He rejoined Tennis Scotland as LTA academy coach, and became national training coach for Scotland in 2004.

Smith has coached several Scottish junior players, most notably Andy Murray. Smith worked with Murray from age 11 to 15, during which time Murray won the Junior Orange Bowl under-12 title and five ITF Futures events. Smith and Murray remained friends, and Smith assisted Murray at the French Open in 2006 during a period when Murray had no full-time coach.

Smith became the LTA's national under-16s men's coach in 2005 and the under-18s coach in 2008, and was later appointed Head of Player Development in Men's Tennis. He was appointed Head of Men's Tennis simultaneously to his appointment as Davis Cup captain, a position he held until 2014. He also served as Head of Women's Tennis between 2011 and 2013.

== Davis Cup captaincy ==
Smith's appointment as Davis Cup captain was announced by the LTA on 12 April 2010. His appointment at age 34 made him the youngest Great Britain captain since Paul Hutchins (appointed in 1975 aged 30), and one of the few to be appointed without having been a top-level player. His first tie as captain was a Europe/Africa Zone Group II match against Turkey, held at Eastbourne from 9 July 2010, which Great Britain won 5–0, thereby avoiding relegation. In 2011 the Great Britain team won promotion to Europe/Africa Zone Group I, and in 2013 won promotion to the World Group.

In 2014 Great Britain reached the quarter-finals, eventually losing 3–2 to Italy. In 2015, under Smith's captaincy, Great Britain won the Davis Cup for the first time since 1936, beating Belgium 3–1 in the final.

Smith was appointed Officer of the Order of the British Empire (OBE) in the 2016 Birthday Honours for services to tennis.

== Personal life ==
Smith is married and has three children.
