= Alexandros Skorilas =

Greek tennis player (born 2000)

- Country (sports): Greece
- Born: 16 March 2000 (age 25) Ioannina, Greece
- Height: 1.85 m (6 ft 1 in)
- Plays: Right-handed (two-handed backhand)
- Prize money: $43,014

Singles
- Career record: 1–1 (at ATP Tour level, Grand Slam level, and in Davis Cup)
- Career titles: 0
- Highest ranking: No. 705 (6 May 2024)

Doubles
- Career record: 0–1 (at ATP Tour level, Grand Slam level, and in Davis Cup)
- Career titles: 0
- Highest ranking: No. 609 (3 July 2023)

Team competitions
- Davis Cup: 3–0

Alexandros Skorilas (born 16 March 2000) is a Greek tennis player.

Skorilas has a career high ATP singles ranking of No. 705 achieved on 6 May 2025 and a career high doubles ranking of No. 609 achieved on 3 July 2023.

Skorilas represents Greece at the Davis Cup, where he has a W/L record of 3–0.

== ATP Challenger and ITF World Tennis Tour finals ==
=== Singles 2 (0–2) ===
Legend (singles) ATP Challenger Tour (0–0) ITF World Tennis Tour (0–2)	Titles by surface Hard (0–2) Clay (0–0) Grass (0–0) Carpet (0–0)

Result	W–L	Date	Tournament	Tier	Surface	Opponent	Score
Loss	0–1	Jul 2023	M15 Monastir, Tunisia	World Tennis Tour	Hard	(Spain) Alberto Barroso Campos	3–6, 4–6
Loss	0–2	Oct 2023	M15 Heraklion, Greece	World Tennis Tour	Hard	(Czech Republic) Jakub Nicod	2–6, 2–6

=== Doubles: 5 (3–2) ===
Legend ATP Challenger (0–0) ITF World Tennis Tour (3–2)	Finals by surface Hard (3–1) Clay (0–1) Grass (0–0) Carpet (0–0)

Result	W–L	Date	Tournament	Tier	Surface	Partner	Opponents	Score
Win	1–0	Jul 2022	M25 Idanha-a-Nova, Portugal	World Tennis Tour	Hard	(Japan) Rio Noguchi	(Chinese Taipei) Ray Ho (Canada) Kelsey Stevenson	6–7^{(4–7)}, 6–3, [10–3]
Win	2–0	Oct 2022	M15 Heraklion, Greece	World Tennis Tour	Hard	(Greece) Christos Antonopoulos	(Netherlands) Raphael Calzi (Germany) Marlon Vankan	6–4, 6–2
Loss	2–1	Apr 2023	M15 Alaminos-Larnaca Cyprus	World Tennis Tour	Clay	(Italy) Sebastian Gima	(Cyprus) Stylianos Christodoulou (Cyprus) Sergis Kyratzis	0–6, 3–6
Win	3–1	Jun 2023	M15 Monastir, Tunisia	World Tennis Tour	Hard	(Italy) Luca Giacomini	(United Kingdom) Billy Blaydes (United Kingdom) Freddy Blaydes	6–3, 7–6^{(7–3)}
Loss	3-2	Mar 2024	M15 Heraklion, Greece	World Tennis Tour	Hard	(Greece) Aristotelis Thanos	(Slovakia) Tomáš Lánik (Slovakia) Samuel Puskar	6–7^{(2–7)}, 2–6
