= Kaspi =

Kaspi კასპი
- Town
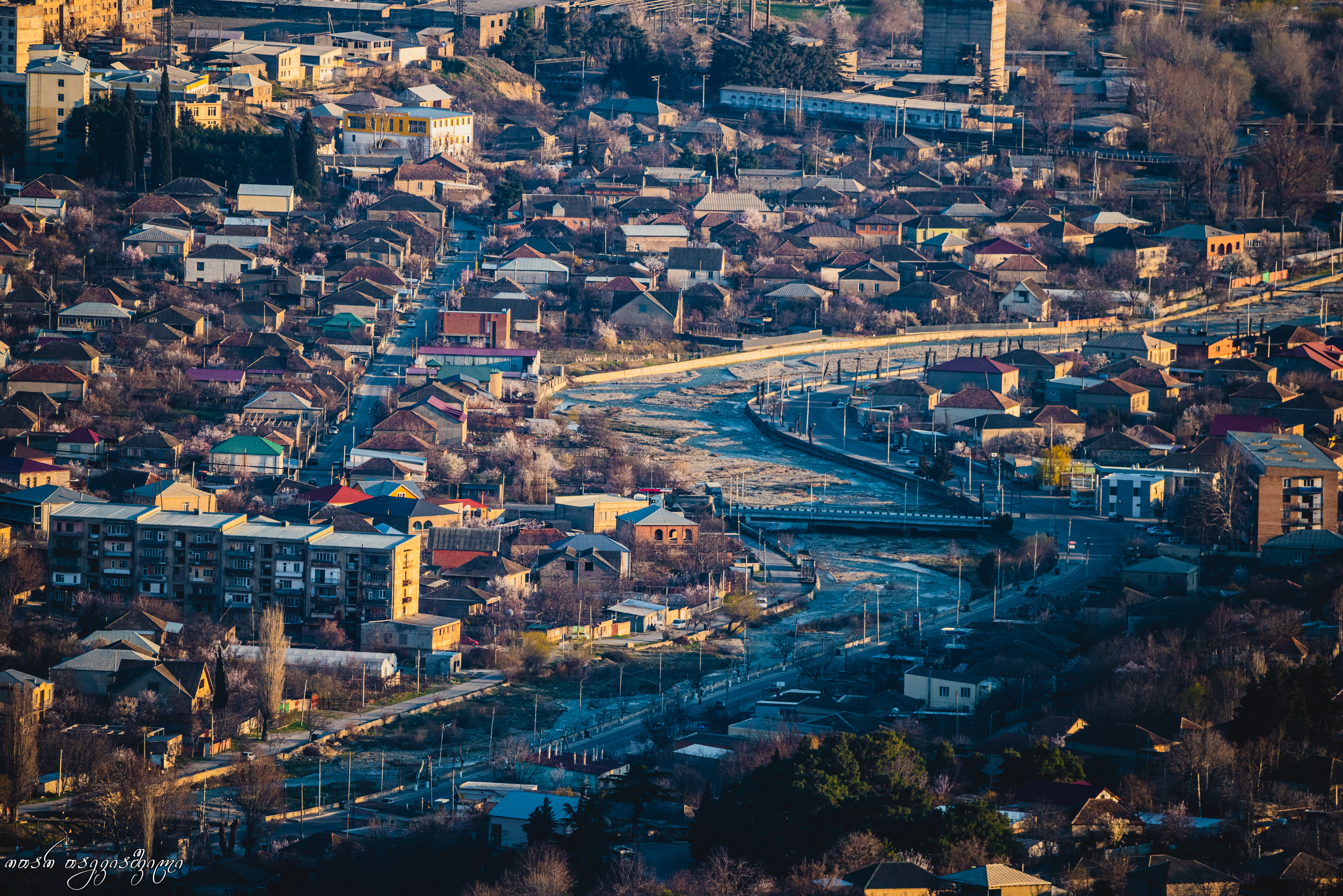
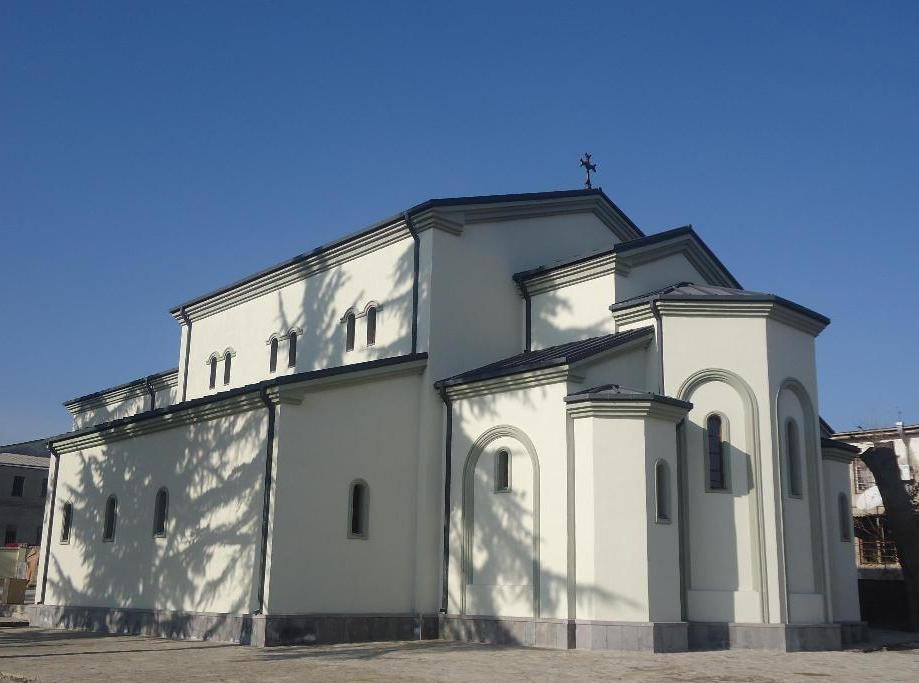
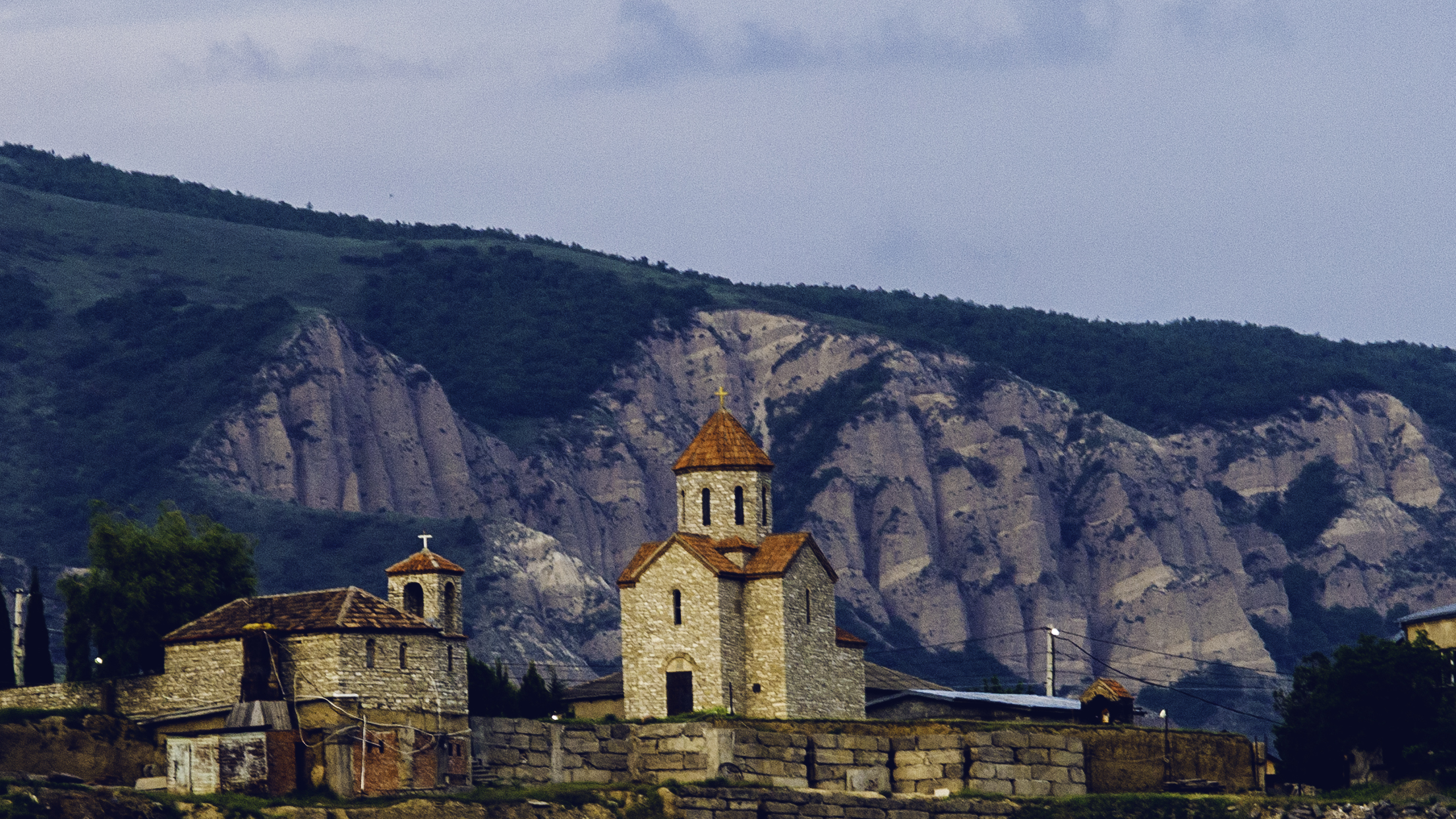
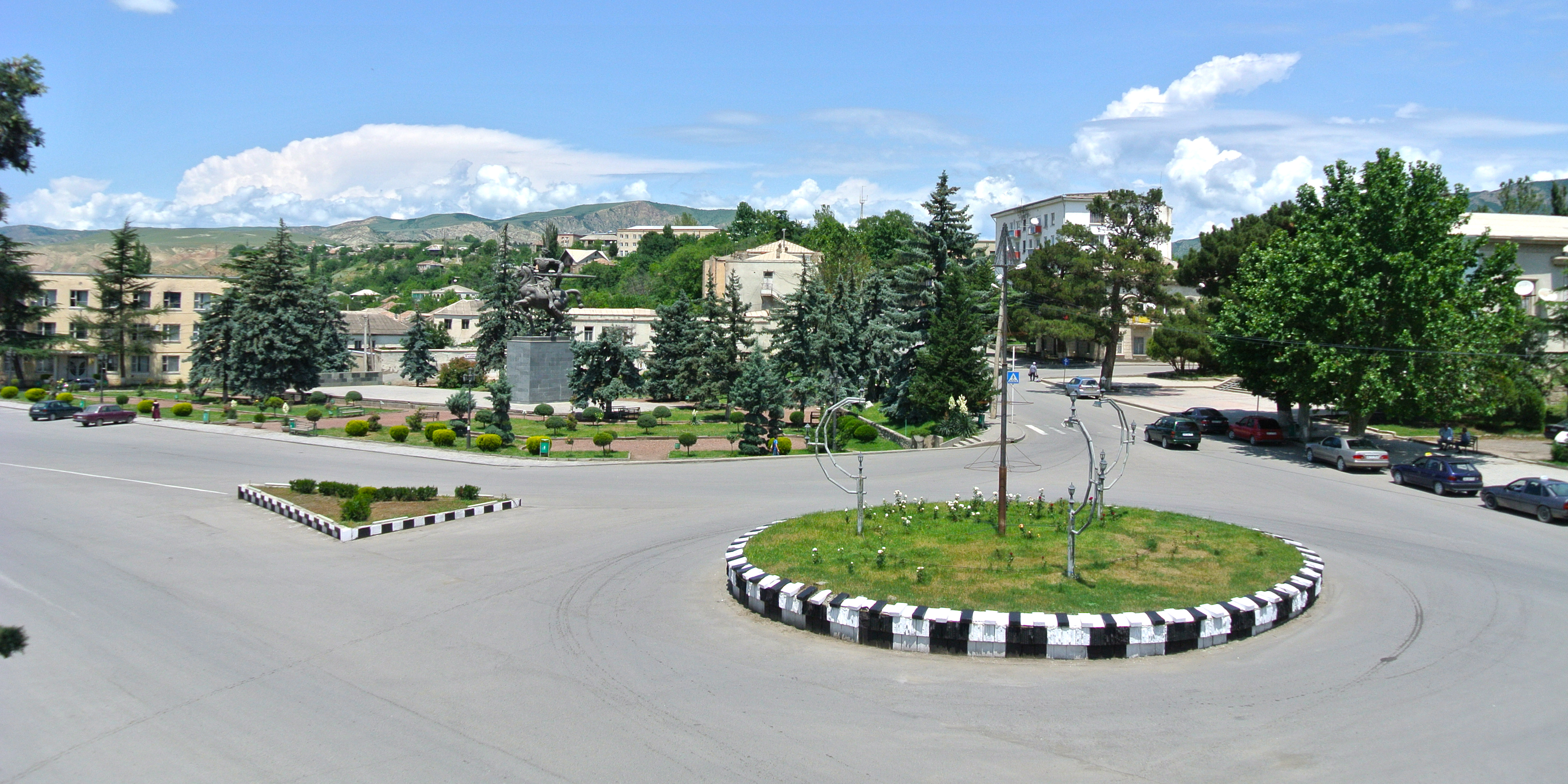
- Panorama of Kaspi Kaspis Catedral St. George's church Kaspi Centre
- Interactive map of Kaspi
- Location within Georgia Location within Shida Kartli
- Coordinates: 41°55′30″N 44°25′20″E
- Country: Georgia
- Region: Shida Kartli
- District: Kaspi
- Town from: 1959
- Highest elevation: 700 m (2,300 ft)
- Lowest elevation: 560 m (1,840 ft)

Population (January 1, 2024)
  - Total: 12,415
- Time zone: UTC+4 (Georgian Time)
- Area code: +995 371
- Website: http://www.kaspi.org.ge

Kaspi (Georgian: კასპი) is a town in central Georgia on the Mtkvari River. It is a center of Kaspi district, one of the four districts in Shida Kartli region. Founded in the early Middle Ages, the town turned into possession of the Amilakhvari noble family in the 15th century. Kaspi officially acquired a town's status in 1959 and, as of January 2023, had a population of 12,708.

The Kaspi cement plant is one of Georgia's largest industrial facilities and sources of air pollution.

During the Russia-Georgia war, the cement factory, as well as the railway bridge in the city were severely damaged by the Russian raids.

== History ==
Kaspi is one of the oldest cities in Georgia. It is first mentioned in the 4th century. During this period, Kaspi was one of largest and most important cities of the Iberian (old Georgian state) kingdom. It is on the trade routes shown on the late antiquity Peutinger map. Kaspi was the center of the historical administration object "Kaspis Sasparsalaro". In the 8th century, the city was destroyed after a battle with Arabs. In the 20th century, the town was again upgraded and developed.

Grakliani Hill, one of the oldest and richest human archaeological sites, is located near Kaspi.

== See also ==
- Shida Kartli
