= Spanish Tennis Championship =

Competition organized by the Royal Spanish Tennis Federation

- Status: active
- Genre: sports event
- Date: midyear
- Frequency: annual
- Country: Spain
- Inaugurated: 1910
- Organiser: European Tennis Association (ETA)

The Spanish Tennis Championship (Spanish: Campeonato de España absoluto masculino is an annual tennis competition organized by the Royal Spanish Tennis Federation since its foundation in 1910. It was held every year except between 1937 and 1939 due to the Spanish Civil War.

Throughout the years, the Men's Spanish Championships expanded beyond the main event, introducing additional categories such as second and third-division tournaments, repechage rounds, and handicap competitions; overall, the men’s doubles event was added in 1923, the women's singles and doubles in 1925, and the mixed doubles in 1927. The Spanish Championship was quite popular during the 1960s with the emergence of tennis players such as Andrés Gimeno, Manuel Santana, and Manuel Orantes.

== History ==
=== First years ===
In September 1909, Luis de Uhagón of Madrid, Jorge Barrié of San Sebastian, Ernest Witty and Manuel Tey of Barcelona, among others, founded the Lawn-Tennis Association of Spain (Spanish: Asociación General de Lawn Tennis, AGLT), which would become the Royal Spanish Tennis Federation in 1940. To enhance the prestige and sporting significance of the ALTE, it was decided to establish the Spanish Championships, with its first tournament taking place in 1910 on the courts of the Madrid Lawn-Tennis Club, which is currently part of the gardens of the Italian Embassy in the Salamanca district. The inaugural champion was Luis de Uhagón, who successfully defended his title in 1911 at the RLT Turó in Barcelona.

Establishing the competition nationwide proved challenging, as it required strong commitment from clubs to ensure its success. One of the key factors in its consolidation was the emergence of Spain's first great generation of tennis players, including the Count of Gomar, who won four consecutive titles from 1916 to 1918, and the Alonso brothers Manuel and José María, with the former winning in 1915 and 1919–20. In 1923, the tournament expanded with the addition of the men's doubles event, which was won by Antonio Juanico and Ricardo Saprissa, the latter having also played as a goalkeeper for RCD Espanyol in Barcelona. In that same year, Eduardo Flaquer won the first of his three national titles, thus matching Gomar and Alonso with three Spanish titles, a record that was soon destroyed by Enrique Maier, who won seven consecutive Spanish Championships between 1929 and 1935, as well as six in doubles: with Francisco Sindreu (1929, 1932, 1934), Eduard Flaquer (1930), Juan Manuel Blanc (1935), and with Fernando de Olózaga (1944).

The first women's singles event was held in Santander in 1925, and it was won by Concha Liencres, while the first women's doubles was won by the pair Josefa Gomar and Baroness de Segur. Two years later, in 1927, Gomar paired with Flaquer to win the first mixed doubles event. In its first years, the women's singles event was dominated by Bella Dutton, who won five championships, including a three-peat in 1931–1933, a feat that was immediately matched by Josefa Chávarri in 1934–1936, but she was unable to break the record because of the outbreak of the Civil War, after which she won two more titles (1941 and 1943) for a total of five, a record that was broken by María Josefa Riba, who won seven consecutive titles between 1944 and 1950, followed by eight in 1953. Since then, both Pilar Barril and Carmen Perea have won 9 titles each.

=== Golden age ===
The Spanish Championship was quite popular during the 1960s with the emergence of tennis players such as Andrés Gimeno, Manuel Santana, and Manuel Orantes.

== Results ==
=== Men's ===
**In bold** = Campion
(1) = Number of titles

Edition	Any	Singles champion	Result	Singles runner-up	Men's double champions	Headquarters	City
I	1910	**Luis de Uhagón**	6-2, 6-2, 6-0	Santiago Méndez-Vigo	—N/a	Madrid LTC, Madrid	
II	1911	**Luis de Uhagón** (2)	6-3, 6-4, 6-3	Ernest Witty	—N/a	RLT Turó, Barcelona	
III	1912	**José María Alonso**	7-5, 3-6, 6-2, 6-4	Luis de Uhagón	—N/a	Recreation Club, Sant Sebastià	
IV	1913	**Vicente Marín Bertrán**		José Maria Sagnier	—N/a	Club de Los Ingleses, Madrid	
V	1914	**José Maria Sagnier**	6-4, 7-5, 1-6, 6-1	Vicente Marín Bertrán	—N/a	RCT Barcelona, Barcelona	
VI	1915	**Manuel Alonso**	5-7, 6-2, 7-5, 4-6, 6-0	Manuel de Gomar	—N/a	Recreation Club, Sant Sebastià	
VII	1916	**Manuel de Gomar**	7-5, 6-4, 6-3	José María Alonso	—N/a	RC Puerta Hierro, Madrid	
VIII	1917	**Manuel de Gomar** (2)	6-3, 5-7, 7-5, 6-4	Manuel Alonso	—N/a	Club Marítimo del Abra, Bilbao	
IX	1918	**Manuel de Gomar** (3)	3-6, 6-3, 6-2, 6-1	Eduardo Flaquer	—N/a	RCT Barcelona, Barcelona	
X	1919	**Manuel Alonso** (2)	2-6, 6-0, 6-3, 6-4	Enrique Satrústegui	—N/a	Recreation Club, Sant Sebastià	
XI	1920	**Manuel Alonso** (3)	6-2, 6-4, 6-1	José Miguel Fernández	—N/a	LTC Gijón, Gijón	
XII	1921	**Fleetwood Keighly Peach**		John Howard Howell	—N/a	RC Recreativo, Huelva	
no es disputà l'any 1922
XIII	1923	**Eduardo Flaquer**	3-6, 6-2, 6-0, 6-3	Raimundo Morales	A Juanico - R Saprissa	RLT Turó, Barcelona	Barcelona
XIV	1924	**Eduardo Flaquer** (2)	6-4, 6-1, 6-2	Ricardo Saprissa	A Juanico - R Saprissa	LTC Huelva, Huelva	Huelva
XV	1925	**Raimundo Morales**	6-2, 6-4, 6-3	José Eduardo Olano	R Morales - JE Olano	RST Santander, Santander	Santander
XVI	1926	**Francisco Sindreu**	7-9, 6-4, 6-4, 6-3	Eduardo Flaquer	E Flaquer - R Morales	R Zaragoza CT, Saragossa	Saragossa
XVII	1927	**Eduardo Flaquer** (3)	2-6, 6-1, 6-0, 6-2	Raimundo Morales	E Flaquer - R Morales	RC Puerta Hierro, Madrid	Madrid
XVIII	1928	**Francisco Sindreu** (2)	6-3, 7-5, 6-4	Eduardo Flaquer	E Flaquer - R Morales	RCT Barcelona, Barcelona	Barcelona
XIX	1929	**Enrique Maier**	6-1, 6-2, 6-0	José María Tejada	E Maier - F Sindreu	RST Pompeia, Barcelona	Barcelona
XX	1930	**Enrique Maier** (2)	6-3, 6-4, 6-3	Francisco Sindreu	E Flaquer - E Maier	RLT Turó, Barcelona	Barcelona
XXI	1931	**Enrique Maier** (3)		Manuel Alonso	J Durall - E Flaquer	RCT Barcelona, Barcelona	Barcelona
XXII	1932	**Enrique Maier** (4)		Antonio Juanico	E Maier - F Sindreu	RST Pompeia, Barcelona	Barcelona
XXIII	1933	**Enrique Maier** (5)		Eduardo Flaquer	J Durall - Antonio Juanico	Club de Campo, Madrid	Madrid
XXIV	1934	**Enrique Maier** (6)		Artur Suqué	E Maier - F Sindreu	Sporting Club, València	València
XXV	1935	**Enrique Maier** (7)		Juan Manuel Blanc	JM Blanc - E Maier	RCT Barcelona, Barcelona	Barcelona
XXVI	1936	**Pedro Masip**		Francisco Sindreu	A Boter - R Rubio	RC Polo, Barcelona	Barcelona
It was not disputed between 1937 and 1939 due to the outbreak of the Spanish Civil War
XXVII	1940	**Juan Manuel Blanc**		Luis Carles	L Carles - J Soler Cabot	RC Tenis	Sant Sebastià
XXVIII	1941	**Juan Manuel Blanc** (2)		Luis Carles	JM Olózaga - JM Blanc	RST Pompeia	Barcelona
XXIX	1942	**Luis Carles**		Jaime Bartrolí	J Bartrolí - L Carles	RCT Barcelona	Barcelona
XXX	1943	**Pedro Castellà**		Luis Carles	J Bartrolí - L Carles	RST Magdalena	Santander
XXXI	1944	**Pedro Castellà** (2)		Luis Carles	E Maier - F Olózaga	RC Jolaseta	Neguri-Bilbao
XXXII	1945	**Pedro Masip** (2)		Pedro Castellà	J Bartrolí - P Castellà	RC Puerta Hierro, Madrid	Madrid
XXXIII	1946	**Pedro Masip** (3)		Luis Carles	J Bartrolí - P Masip	RCT Turó, Barcelona	Barcelona
XXXIV	1947	**Pedro Masip** (4)		Mario Szavost	J Bartrolí - P Masip	RC Jolaseta	Neguri-Bilbao
XXXV	1948	**Pedro Masip** (5)		Mario Szavost	J Bartrolí - P Masip	R Zaragoza CT, Saragossa	Saragossa
XXXVI	1949	**Pedro Masip** (6)		Luis Carles	J Bartrolí - P Masip	C Español de Tenis	València
XXXVII	1950	**Pedro Masip** (7)		Luis Carles	P Masip - JM Draper	CT Oviedo	Oviedo
XXXVIII	1951	Emilio Martínez		Carlos Ferrer	E Martínez - E Fleischner	RST Santander	Santander
XXXIX	1952	Fernando Olózaga		Carlos Ferrer	E Martínez - J Bartrolí	CT La Salut	Barcelona
XL	1953	Carlos Ferrer		Emilio Martínez	E Fleischner - F Olózaga	CA Montemar	Alacant
XLI	1954	Emilio Martínez		Josep Maria Draper	JM Couder - A Gimeno	RC Tenis	Sant Sebastià
XLII	1955	Juan Manuel Couder		Andrés Gimeno	A Arilla - A Gimeno	RCT Turó	Barcelona
XLIII	1956	Juan Manuel Couder		Andrés Gimeno	A Arilla - A Gimeno	RCT Betis	Sevilla
XLIV	1957	Andreu Gimeno		Juan Manuel Couder	A Arilla - A Gimeno	RC Jolaseta	Neguri-Bilbao
XLV	1958	Manuel Santana		Juan Manuel Couder	A Arilla - A Gimeno	R Zaragoza CT	Saragossa
XLVI	1959	Andrés Gimeno		Juan Manuel Couder	JL Arilla - A Gimeno	CT Alameda	Madrid
XLVII	1960	Manuel Santana		José Luis Arilla	M Santana - JM Couder	Club de Campo	Vigo
XLVIII	1961	Manuel Santana		Juan Manuel Couder	A Arilla - A Martínez	RCT Turó	Barcelona
XLIX	1962	Manuel Santana		Juan Manuel Couder	M Santana - JL Arilla	Club de Tennis Valencia	València
L	1963	Manuel Santana		Juan Manuel Couder	A Arilla - JL Arilla	RC Polo	Barcelona
LI	1964	Manuel Santana		Juan Manuel Couder	JM Couder - A Esplugas	RCT Barcelona	Barcelona
LII	1965	Juan Manuel Couder		Juan Gisbert	JM Couder - A Martínez	CT La Salut	Barcelona
LIII	1966	Juan Manuel Couder		Juan Gisbert	JL Arilla - JM Gisbert	RC Recreativo	Huelva
LIV	1967	Manuel Orantes		José Luis Arilla	JL Arilla - M Orantes	Murcia CT	Murcia
LV	1968	Manuel Santana		Manuel Orantes	M Santana - JM Gisbert	RC Polo	Barcelona
LVI	1969	Manuel Santana		Manuel Orantes	M Santana - JM Gisbert	RCT Turó	Barcelona
LVII	1970	Manuel Orantes		Juan Gisbert	M Orantes - A Muñoz	CT Chamartín	Madrid
LVIII	1971	Manuel Orantes		Juan Gisbert	M Orantes - A Muñoz	CT Avilés	Avilés
LIX	1972	Andrés Gimeno		Manuel Orantes	A Gimeno - A Muñoz	Murcia CT	Murcia
LX	1973	José Higueras		Juan Gisbert	M Orantes - A Muñoz	RC Polo	Barcelona
LXI	1974	Manuel Orantes		Antonio Muñoz	A Muñoz - JI Muntañola	RC Jolaseta	Neguri-Bilbao
LXII	1975	Manuel Orantes		Antonio Muñoz	M Orantes - JM Gisbert	CT València	València
LXIII	1976	José Higueras		Juan Ignacio Muntañola	J Higueras - A Muñoz	CT Oviedo	Oviedo
LXIV	1977	Fernando Luna		Xavier Soler	L Bruguera - R Ruiz	CT La Salut	Barcelona
LXV	1978	José García		Juan Herrera	L Bruguera - R Ruiz	CT Elx	Elx
LXVI	1979	Manuel Orantes		Antonio Muñoz	M Orantes - A Giménez	Real Madrid CF	Madrid
LXVII	1980	Fernando Luna		Roberto Vizcaíno	M Mir - J López Maeso	Real Madrid CF	Madrid
LXVIII	1981	Fernando Luna		Ángel Giménez	A Giménez - S Casal	CT Avilés	Avilés
LXIX	1982	Sergio Casal		José López-Maeso	M Mir - J López Maeso	CT Tarragona	Tarragona
LXX	1983	Emilio Sánchez		Juan Aguilera	J Fargas - G Urpí	RC Polo	Barcelona
LXXI	1984	Jordi Bardóu		Juan Bautista Avendaño	J Arrese - R Vizcaíno	CT Puente Romano	Marbella
LXXII	1985	Emilio Sánchez		Sergio Casal	S Casal - E Sánchez	RST Granada	Granada
LXXIII	1986	Emilio Sánchez		Sergio Casal	S Casal - E Sánchez	C Español de Tenis	València
LXXIV	1987	Fernando Luna		Sergio Casal	No es disputà	RC Pineda	Sevilla
LXXV	1988	Emilio Sánchez		Javier Sánchez-Vicario	S Casal - E Sánchez	Murcia CT	Murcia
LXXVI	1989	Emilio Sánchez		Javier Sánchez-Vicario	S Casal - E Sánchez	CA Montemar	Alacant
LXXVII	1990	Sergi Bruguera		Emilio Sánchez	F Clavet - C Costa	RCT Turó	Barcelona
LXXVIII	1991	Carlos Costa		Sergi Bruguera	F Clavet - C Costa	CT Chamartín	Madrid
LXXIX	1992	Carlos Costa		Francisco Clavet	J Sánchez - J Burillo	TC Mallorca	Palma
LXXX	1993	Javier Sánchez-Vicario		Juan Luis Rascón	J Imaz - E Álvarez	R Zaragoza CT	Saragossa
LXXXI	1994	Tomàs Carbonell		Albert Costa	F Clavet - JM Clavet	Murcia CT	Murcia
LXXXII	1995	Francisco Clavet		Juan Antonio Marín	D Salvador - V Sendín	Murcia CT	Murcia
LXXXIII	1996	Carlos Moyà		Juan Luis Rascón	JL Rascón - M Valor	CT S'Agaró	S'Agaró
LXXXIV	1997	Alberto Berasategui		Albert Costa	JC Velasco - D Salvador	CT La Coruña	La Corunya
LXXXV	1998	Àlex Corretja		Albert Costa	JC Ferrero - V Solves	CT Pamplona	Pamplona
LXXXVI	1999	Francisco Clavet		Juan Carlos Ferrero	F Vicente - JM Vicente	CT Albacete	Albacete
LXXXVII	2000	Àlex Corretja		Francisco Clavet	T Robredo - S Ventura	RS Tiro Pichón	Granada
LXXXVIII	2001	Àlex Corretja		Tommy Robredo	F Vicente - JM Vicente	CT Ciutadella	Ciutadella de Menorca
LXXXIX	2002	Tommy Robredo		Fernando Verdasco	C Reixach - MA López Jaén	Murcia CT	Murcia
XC	2003	Feliciano López		Rafael Nadal	I Esquerdo - D Monedero	Club Internacional de Tenis	Majadahonda
XCI	2004	Fernando Verdasco		Guillermo García López	G Burniol - G García	Club Internacional de Tenis	Majadahonda
XCII	2005	Fernando Verdasco		Javier Genaro	N Almagro - F Vicente	CMD Las Norias	Logronyo
XCIII	2006	Nicolás Almagro		Rubén Ramírez Hidalgo	R Ramírez - JA Sánchez de Luna	RST Magdalena	Santander
XCIV	2007	Nicolás Almagro		Albert Portas	D Monedero - I Esquerdo	CT Albacete	Albacete
XCV	2008	Óscar Hernández		Pablo Andújar	D Marrero - D Muñoz	Cercle Sabadellès 1856	Sabadell
XCVI	2009	David Marrero		Íñigo Cervantes	D Marrero - R Ramírez	CTT Blas Infante	Sevilla
XCVII	2010	Daniel Monedero		Miguel Ángel López	D Marrero - C Poch	CT Albacete	Albacete
XCVIII	2011	Albert Montañés		Pere Riba	G Olaso - P Riba	CE Laietà	Barcelona
XCIX	2012	Pablo Andújar		Albert Ramos	M Fornell - MA López Jaén	CT Benicarló	Benicarló
C	2013	Fernando Verdasco		Feliciano López	A Menéndez - R Ramírez	Pavelló Barris Nord	Lleida
CI	2014	Daniel Muñoz de la Nava		Roberto Carballés Baena	R Carballés - O Roca	CT St. Joan Despí	Sant Joan Despí
CII	2015	Steven Díez Monge		Jaume Munar	J Munar - M López	CT St. Joan Despí	Sant Joan Despí
CIII	2016						
CIV	2017						
CV	2018						
CVI	2019						
CVII	2020						
CVIII	2021						
CIX	2022						
CIX	2023						
CIX	2024						

=== Women's ===
Year	Champion	Runner-up	Headquarters
1925	Concha Liencres		Santander
1926	Bella Dutton		Zaragoza
1927	Rosa Torras		Madrid
1928	Bella Dutton (2)		Barcelona
1929	Lilí Álvarez		Barcelona
1930	Maria Cruz López de Lerena		Barcelona
1931	Bella Dutton (3)		Barcelona
1932	Bella Dutton (4)		Barcelona
1933	Bella Dutton (5)		Madrid
1934	Josefa Chávarri		Valencia
1935	Josefa Chávarri (2)		Barcelona
1936	Josefa Chávarri (3)		Barcelona
1940	Lilí Álvarez (2)		San Sebastián
1941	Josefa Chávarri (4)		Barcelona
1942	Maria Isabel Maier		Barcelona
1943	Josefa Chávarri (5)		Santander
1944	María Josefa Riba		Bilbao
1945	María Josefa Riba (2)		Madrid
1946	María Josefa Riba (3)		Barcelona
1947	María Josefa Riba (4)		Bilbao
1948	María Josefa Riba (5)		Zaragoza
1949	María Josefa Riba (6)		Valencia
1950	María Josefa Riba (7)		Oviedo
1951	Mercedes Solsona		Santander
1952	Pilar Barril		Barcelona
1953	María Josefa Riba (8)		Alicante
1954	Pilar Barril (2)		San Sebastián
1955	Pilar Barril (3)		Barcelona
1956	Pilar Barril (4)		Sevilla
1957	Mary Weiss		Bilbao
1958	Pilar Barril (5)		Zaragoza
1959	Alicia Guri		Madrid
1960	Pilar Barril (6)		Vigo
1961	Pilar Barril (7)		Barcelona
1962	Pilar Barril (8)		Valencia
1963	Pilar Barril (9)		Barcelona
1964	Maria Carmen Hernández		Barcelona
1965	Ana Maria Estalella		Barcelona
1966	Ana Maria Estalella (2)		Huelva
1967	Mari Carmen Hernández (2)		Murcia
1968	Ana Maria Estalella (3)		Barcelona
1969	Ana Maria Estalella (4)		Barcelona
1970	Mari Carmen Hernández (3)		Madrid
1971	Mari Carmen Hernández (4)		Avilés
1972	Mari Carmen Hernández (5)		Murcia
1973	Carmen Perea		Barcelona
1974	Carmen Perea (2)		Bilbao
1975	Carmen Perea (3)	Vicky Baldovinos	Valencia
1976	Carmen Perea (4)	Vicky Baldovinos	Oviedo
1977	Carmen Perea (5)	Vicky Baldovinos	Barcelona
1978	Carmen Perea (6)	Mónica Álvarez de Mon	Elche
1979	Mónica Álvarez de Mon	Carmen Perea	Madrid
1980	Carmen Perea (7)	Mónica Álvarez de Mon	Madrid
1981	Carmen Perea (8)	Vicky Baldovinos	Avilés
1982	Carmen Perea (9)	C. Franch	Tarragona
1983	Beatriz Pellón	Begonia Eraña	Barcelona
1984	Michelle Granth	Begonia Eraña	Granada
1985	Arantxa Sánchez Vicario	N. Souto	Granada
1986	María José Llorca	María Vaquero	Valencia
1987	Arantxa Sánchez Vicario (2)	María José Llorca	Sevilla
1988	Conchita Martínez	Arantxa Sánchez Vicario	Pamplona
1989	Arantxa Sánchez Vicario (3)	Silvia Ramón	Alicante
1990	Arantxa Sánchez Vicario (4)	P. Pérez	Barcelona
1991	Eva Bes	Rosa María Llaneras	Tarragona
1992	María Antonia Sánchez	S. Bottini	Palma
1993	Virginia Ruano	Patricia Aznar	Zaragoza
1994	Virginia Ruano (2)	Silvia Ramón	Murcia
1995	Cristina Torrens	Gala León	Murcia
1996	Laura Pena	Gala León	Gerona
1997	Virginia Ruano (3)	Gala León	La Coruña
1998	Gala León	Cristina Torrens	Pamplona
1999	Gala León (2)	Marta Marrero	Albacete
2000	Anabel Medina	Mariam Ramón	Granada
2001	Eva Bes (2)	Conchita Martínez Granados	Menorca
2002	Marta Marrero	Marta Fraga	Murcia
2003	María Sánchez Lorenzo	Lourdes Domínguez	Majadahonda
2004	Laura Pous	Marta Fraga	Majadahonda
2005	Nuria Llagostera	Anabel Medina	Logroño
2006	Lourdes Domínguez	Estrella Cabeza	Santander
2007	Eloisa Compostizo de Andrés	María José Martínez	Albacete
2008	Carla Suárez	Nuria Llagostera	Sabadell
2009	Arantxa Parra	Laura Pous	Sevilla
2010	Laura Pous Tió	Leticia Costas-Moreira	Albacete
2011	Carla Suárez (2)	Silvia Soler	San Juan Despí
2012	María Teresa Torró	Silvia Soler	Benicarló
2013	Laura Pous Tió (2)	Anabel Medina	San Juan Despí
2014	Lara Arruabarrena	Paula Badosa	San Juan Despí
2015	María Teresa Torró (2)	Lourdes Domínguez	Barcelona
2016	Lara Arruabarrena (2)	Sara Sorribes	Manacor
2017	Paula Badosa	Carla Suárez	Granada
2018			
2019			
2020			
2021			
2022			
2023			
2024			
