= List of Spain Davis Cup team representatives =

This is a list of tennis players who have represented the Spain Davis Cup team in an official Davis Cup match since Spain took part in the competition for the first time, back in 1921.

== Players ==
This table is current through the end of the 2025 Davis Cup Finals (November 23, 2025).

Name (Note: Active players in boldface) (Note: Davis Cup Commitment Award recipients in italics)	Debut	W-L	W-L (singles)	W-L (doubles)	Ties	Years	Finals	Titles
Aguilera, Juan	1983	7–6	6–4	1–2	6	3	0	0
Alcaraz, Carlos	2022	6–2	5–1	1–1	6	2	0	0
Almagro, Nicolás	2008	8–4	8–4	0–0	7	3	1 (2012)	1 (2008)
Alonso, José María	1924	2–2	0–1	2–1	4	2	0	0
Alonso, Julián	1998	3–2	2–0	1–2	3	2	0	0
Alonso, Manuel	1921	14–11	11–7	3–4	9	6	0	0
Andújar, Pablo	2014	1–2	1–2	0–0	2	2	0	0
Arilla, Alberto	1958	4–4	0–2	4–2	6	4	0	0
Arilla, José Luis	1959	21–19	4–6	17–13	30	10	2 (1965, 1967)	0
Arrese, Jordi	1989	2–1	2–1	0–0	2	2	0	0
Avendaño, Juan	1983	1–0	1–0	0–0	1	1	0	0
Balcells, Joan	1999	8–4	2–1	6–3	9	4	1 (2000)	1 (2000)
Bartrolí, Jaime	1946	1–4	1–0	0–4	4	4	0	0
Bautista, Roberto	2014	15–7	15–7	0–0	17	8	1 (2019)	1 (2019)
Berasategui, Alberto	1993	2–2	2–2	0–0	3	3	0	0
Blanc, Juan Manuel	1936	0–1	0–0	0–1	1	1	0	0
Bruguera, Sergi	1990	12–11	11–9	1–2	10	6	0	0
Burillo, Jordi	1994	1–1	1–1	0–0	1	1	0	0
Carbonell, Tomás	1991	4–2	1–1	3–1	5	4	0	0
Carles, Luis	1946	2–3	0–1	2–2	2	2	0	0
Carreño, Pablo	2016	8–11	6–9	2–2	15	8	2 (2019, 2025)	1 (2019)
Casal, Sergio	1981	31–17	12–8	19–9	29	14	0	0
Castellá, Pedro	1946	0–3	0–3	0–0	2	2	0	0
Clavet, Francisco	1999	3–0	3–0	0–0	2	2	0	1 (2000)
Corretja, Àlex	1996	20–11	12–13	8–8	19	8	2 (2000, 2003)	1 (2000)
Costa, Albert	1996	11–8	9–5	2–3	13	6	1 (2000)	1 (2000)
Costa, Carlos	1992	6–5	5–4	1–1	7	6	0	0
Couder, Juan Manuel	1956	17–15	15–11	2–4	17	8	1 (1965)	0
Davidovich, Alejandro	2022	1–5	1–2	0–3	4	2	0	0
De Gomar, Manuel	1921	10–8	7–5	3–3	6	3	0	0
Draper, José María	1953	4–4	2–3	2–1	4	3	0	0
Durall, Alberto	1933	1–2	0–1	1–1	2	2	0	0
Ferrer, Carlos	1953	4–5	3–4	1–1	4	2	0	0
Ferrer, David	2006	28–5	28–5	0–0	20	10	4 (2008, 2009, 2011, 2012)	3 (2008, 2009, 2011)
Ferrero, Juan Carlos	2000	18–7	18–6	0–1	18	8	3 (2000, 2003, 2004)	3 (2003, 2004, 2009)
Flaquer, Eduardo	1922	14–15	9–10	5–5	13	7	0	0
García López, Guillermo	2013	0–1	0–1	0–0	1	1	0	0
García Requena, José	1981	2–0	2–0	0–0	1	1	0	0
Giménez, Ángel	1976	6–4	2–3	4–1	7	4	0	0
Gimeno, Andrés	1958	23–10	18–5	5–5	13	5	0	0
Gisbert, José María	1969	1–0	1–0	0–0	1	1	0	0
Gisbert, Juan	1965	45–24	27–20	18–4	37	10	2 (1965, 1967)	0
Granollers, Marcel	2010	15–13	2–1	13–12	25	11	4 (2008, 2012, 2019, 2025)	3 (2008, 2011, 2019)
Higueras, José	1973	21–18	15–15	6–3	17	7	0	0
Juanico, Antonio	1926	6–9	6–8	0–1	7	5	0	0
López, Feliciano	2003	19–23	8–9	11–14	32	15	5 (2003, 2008, 2009, 2011, 2019)	5 (2004, 2008, 2009, 2011, 2019)
López, Marc	2012	6–8	2–0	4–8	12	6	1 (2012)	0
López-Maeso, José	1981	7–3	5–3	2–0	5	2	0	0
Luna, Fernando	1979	9–4	9–4	0–0	7	5	0	0
Maier, Enrique	1929	13–13	7–10	6–3	9	7	0	0
Mantilla, Félix	1999	1–0	1–0	0–0	1	1	0	0
Marrero, David	2014	0–3	0–0	0–3	3	2	0	0
Martín, Alberto	2002	0–2	0–1	0–1	1	1	0	1 (2004)
Martínez, Emilio	1953	5–12	4–12	1–0	10	5	0	0
Martínez, Pedro	2022	9–3	2–1	7–2	9	2	1 (2025)	0
Mir, Miguel	1981	1–0	0–0	1–0	1	1	0	0
Morales, Raimundo	1926	3–3	1–0	2–3	5	3	0	0
Moyà, Carlos	1996	20–7	20–7	0–0	15	7	2 (2003, 2004)	1 (2004)
Munar, Jaume	2017	3–4	1–4	2–0	6	2	1 (2025)	0
Muñoz, Antonio	1971	6–9	4–6	2–3	14	8	0	0
Nadal, Rafael	2004	37–6	29–2	8–4	24	12	4 (2004, 2009, 2011, 2019)	5 (2004, 2008, 2009, 2011, 2019)
Olozaga, Fernando	1953	2–3	0–0	2–3	5	3	0	0
Orantes, Manuel	1967	60–27	39–19	21–8	38	14	1 (1967)	0
Ramos, Albert	2013	6–4	6–3	0–1	6	6	0	0
Robredo, Tommy	2002	9–12	6–8	3–4	14	8	1 (2004)	3 (2004, 2008, 2009)
Roig, Francisco	1997	0–1	0–0	0–1	1	1	0	0
Sánchez, Emilio	1984	32–23	18–14	14–9	24	12	0	0
Sánchez, Javier	1987	3–6	3–2	0–4	7	5	0	0
Santana, Manuel	1958	92–28	69–17	23–11	46	14	2 (1965, 1967)	0
Saprissa, Ricardo	1930	1–0	0–0	1–0	1	1	0	0
Sindreu, Francisco	1926	7–8	6–7	1–1	8	5	0	0
Soler, Javier	1977	2–0	1–0	1–0	2	1	0	0
Suqué, Arturo	1934	0–2	0–2	0–0	1	1	0	0
Szavoszt, Mario	1947	1–4	1–3	0–1	2	2	0	0
Tejada, José María	1929	2–2	0–1	2–1	3	3	0	0
Tous, Alberto	1983	1–0	1–0	0–0	1	1	0	0
Verdasco, Fernando	2005	18–13	9–5	9–8	19	10	3 (2008, 2009, 2011)	3 (2008, 2009, 2011)
Zapata, Bernabé	2023	1–1	1–1	0–0	2	1	0	0
