= 1927 International Lawn Tennis Challenge Europe Zone =

International tennis competition

The Europe Zone was one of the two regional zones of the 1927 International Lawn Tennis Challenge.

21 teams entered the Europe Zone, with the winner going on to compete in the Inter-Zonal Final against the winner of the America Zone. France defeated Denmark in the final, and went on to face Japan in the Inter-Zonal Final.

== Draw ==
First Round; 29 April–9 May
France
bye
Romania
bye
Hungary
bye
Italy
bye
Portugal
bye
Germany
bye
South Africa	5
Ireland	0
Switzerland	3
Austria	2
Denmark	4
Netherlands	1
Sweden	1
Great Britain	4
Spain	2
India	3
bye
Yugoslavia
bye
Czechoslovakia
bye
Greece
bye
Poland
bye
Belgium

Second Round; 6–22 May
Paris, France (clay)
France	5
Romania	0
Budapest, Hungary
Hungary	2
Italy	3
Lisbon, Portugal (clay)
Portugal	0
Germany	5
Montreux, Switzerland
South Africa	5
Switzerland	0
Harrogate, England (clay)
Denmark	3
Great Britain	2
Zagreb, Yugoslavia
India	3
Yugoslavia	0
Prague, Czechoslovakia
Czechoslovakia	4
Greece	1
Brussels, Belgium
Poland	0
Belgium	5

Quarterfinals; 9–13 June
Rome, Italy (clay)
France	3
Italy	2
Berlin, Germany
Germany	1
South Africa	4
Copenhagen, Denmark
Denmark	5
India	0
Prague, Czechoslovakia
Czechoslovakia	4
Belgium	1

Semifinals; 8–11 July
Eastbourne, England (grass)
France	5
South Africa	0
Prague, Czechoslovakia
Denmark	3
Czechoslovakia	2

Final; 21–22 July
Copenhagen, Denmark (clay)
France	3
Denmark	0

== First round ==
=== Ireland vs. South Africa ===
Ireland
0
Fitzwilliam Lawn Tennis Club, Dublin, Ireland
6–9 May 1927
Grass

South Africa
5

			1	2	3	4	5
1	(Republic of Ireland) (South Africa)	Cecil Campbell; Jack Condon	6; 3	6; 2	3; 6	3; 6	4; 6
2	(Republic of Ireland) (South Africa)	Arthur Mahony; Patrick Spence	2; 6	3; 6	6; 8
3	(Republic of Ireland) (South Africa)	Arthur Mahony / Louis Meldon; Jack Condon / Louis Raymond	3; 6	2; 6	5; 7
4	(Republic of Ireland) (South Africa)	Arthur Mahony; Jack Condon	0; 6	6; 8	1; 6
5	(Republic of Ireland) (South Africa)	Louis Meldon; Patrick Spence	3; 6	1; 6	6; 4	6; 3	4; 6

=== Switzerland vs. Austria ===
Switzerland
3
Basel, Switzerland
29 April–1 May 1927

Austria
2

			1	2	3	4	5
1	(Switzerland) (Austria)	Charles Aeschlimann; Franz-Wilhelm Matejka	4; 6	6; 1	6; 1	6; 3
2	(Switzerland) (Austria)	Jean Wuarin; Hermann von Artens	6; 1	6; 0	6; 4
3	(Switzerland) (Austria)	Charles Aeschlimann / Maurice Ferrier; Hermann von Artens / Ludwig Salm-Hoogstraeten	10; 8	6; 4	6; 8	6; 2
4	(Switzerland) (Austria)	Jean Wuarin; Franz-Wilhelm Matejka	3; 6	2; 6	4; 6
5	(Switzerland) (Austria)	Charles Aeschlimann; Hermann von Artens	5; 7	1; 6	1; 6

=== Denmark vs. Netherlands ===
Denmark
4
Copenhagen, Denmark
3–5 May 1927

Netherlands
1

			1	2	3	4	5
1	(Denmark) (Netherlands)	Einer Ulrich; Hendrik Timmer	6; 0	1; 6	6; 4	7; 5
2	(Denmark) (Netherlands)	Axel Petersen; Cornelis Bryan	6; 2	6; 1	1; 6	3; 6	6; 1
3	(Denmark) (Netherlands)	Povl Henriksen / Einer Ulrich; Christiaan van Lennep / Hendrik Timmer	6; 1	3; 6	6; 3	6; 4
4	(Denmark) (Netherlands)	Einer Ulrich; Cornelis Bryan	6; 1	6; 3	6; 0
5	(Denmark) (Netherlands)	Axel Petersen; Hendrik Timmer	3; 6	4; 6	6; 4	6; 8

=== Great Britain vs. Sweden ===
Great Britain
4
Tally Ho! Lawn Tennis Club, Birmingham, England
6–9 May 1927
Clay

Sweden
1

			1	2	3	4	5
1	(United Kingdom) (Sweden)	Charles Kingsley; Ingvar Garell	6; 2	6; 1	7; 5
2	(United Kingdom) (Sweden)	Edward Higgs; Sune Malmström	3; 6	6; 3	6; 0	3; 6	6; 2
3	(United Kingdom) (Sweden)	Leslie Godfree / Colin Gregory; Sune Malmström / Henning Müller	4; 6	6; 3	6; 1	6; 1
4	(United Kingdom) (Sweden)	Charles Kingsley; Sune Malmström	4; 6	2; 6	3; 6
5	(United Kingdom) (Sweden)	Edward Higgs; Ingvar Garell	8; 6	8; 6	3; 6	9; 7

=== Spain vs. India ===
Spain
2
Real Club de Tenis Barcelona, Barcelona, Spain
7–9 May 1927
Clay

India
3

			1	2	3	4	5
1	(Spain) (India)	Eduardo Flaquer; Sri-Krishna Prasada	2; 6	2; 6	3; 6
2	(Spain) (India)	Antonio Juanico; Hassan Ali Fyzee	3; 6	6; 3	3; 6	6; 4	6; 1
3	(Spain) (India)	Eduardo Flaquer / Raimundo Morales Marqués; Hassan Ali Fyzee / Sri-Krishna Prasada	6; 0	3; 6	3; 6	3; 6
4	(Spain) (India)	Antonio Juanico; Sri-Krishna Prasada	9; 11	4; 6	3; 6
5	(Spain) (India)	Eduardo Flaquer; Hassan Ali Fyzee	7; 5	6; 0	6; 2

== Second round ==
=== France vs. Romania ===
France
5
Racing Club de France, Paris, France
14–16 May 1927
Clay

Romania
0

			1	2	3	4	5
1	(France) (Romania)	Jean Borotra; Ghica Poulieff	6; 1	6; 2	6; 2
2	(France) (Romania)	René Lacoste; Nicolae Mișu	6; 3	6; 2	6; 2
3	(France) (Romania)	Jean Borotra / Jacques Brugnon; Nicolae Mișu / Ghica Poulieff	6; 4	6; 1	8; 6
4	(France) (Romania)	Jacques Brugnon; Ghica Poulieff	6; 1	6; 1	6; 0
5	(France) (Romania)	Jean Borotra; Nicolae Mișu	6; 4	2; 6	6; 4	7; 5

=== Hungary vs. Italy ===
Hungary
2
Budapest, Hungary
13–15 May 1927

Italy
3

			1	2	3	4	5
1	(Hungary) (Italy)	Béla von Kehrling; Uberto De Morpurgo	7; 5	4; 6	4; 6	7; 5	1; 6
2	(Hungary) (Italy)	Imre Takáts; Giorgio de Stefani	2; 6	1; 6	6; 4	6; 3	6; 4
3	(Hungary) (Italy)	Béla von Kehrling / Jenő Péteri; Uberto De Morpurgo / Giorgio de Stefani	3; 6	5; 7	6; 8
4	(Hungary) (Italy)	Imre Takáts; Uberto De Morpurgo	2; 6	1; 6	5; 7
5	(Hungary) (Italy)	Béla von Kehrling; Clemente Serventi	6; 2	6; 1	6; 4

=== Portugal vs. Germany ===
Portugal
0
Sporting Club, Lisbon, Portugal
13–15 May 1927
Clay

Germany
5

			1	2	3	4	5
1	(Portugal) (Germany)	José de Verda; Georg Demasius	6; 4	0; 6	3; 6	3; 6
2	(Portugal) (Germany)	Antonio Casanovas; Hans Moldenhauer	2; 6	2; 6	4; 6
3	(Portugal) (Germany)	Antonio Casanovas / José de Verda; Georg Demasius / Hans Moldenhauer	4; 6	6; 4	1; 6	2; 6
4	(Portugal) (Germany)	Antonio Casanovas; Friedrich Wilhelm Rahe	4; 6	4; 6	6; 1	3; 6
5	(Portugal) (Germany)	José de Verda; Hans Moldenhauer	8; 6	3; 6	7; 5	2; 6	1; 6

=== Switzerland vs. South Africa ===
Switzerland
0
Montreux, Switzerland
20–22 May 1927

South Africa
5

			1	2	3	4	5
1	(Switzerland) (South Africa)	Jean Wuarin; Jack Condon	0; 6	2; 6	6; 2	5; 7
2	(Switzerland) (South Africa)	Charles Aeschlimann; Patrick Spence	4; 6	4; 6	7; 9
3	(Switzerland) (South Africa)	Charles Aeschlimann / Maurice Ferrier; Louis Raymond / Patrick Spence	2; 6	7; 9	4; 6
4	(Switzerland) (South Africa)	Charles Aeschlimann; Jack Condon	4; 6	4; 6	2; 6
5	(Switzerland) (South Africa)	Jean Wuarin; Patrick Spence	1; 6	6; 8	2; 6

=== Great Britain vs. Denmark ===
Great Britain
2
Royal Hall Grounds, Harrogate, England
19–21 May 1927
Clay

Denmark
3

			1	2	3	4	5
1	(United Kingdom) (Denmark)	Colin Gregory; Einer Ulrich	0; 6	3; 6	6; 3	6; 3	2; 6
2	(United Kingdom) (Denmark)	Edward Higgs; Erik Worm	6; 3	6; 4	8; 10	10; 8
3	(United Kingdom) (Denmark)	Leslie Godfree / Colin Gregory; Einer Ulrich / Erik Worm	4; 6	6; 1	2; 6	5; 7
4	(United Kingdom) (Denmark)	Colin Gregory; Erik Worm	6; 8	6; 4	10; 8	6; 4
5	(United Kingdom) (Denmark)	Edward Higgs; Einer Ulrich	6; 1	6; 3	2; 6	2; 6	4; 6

=== Yugoslavia vs. India ===
Yugoslavia
0
Zagreb, Yugoslavia
20–22 May 1927

India
3

			1	2	3	4	5
1	(Kingdom of Yugoslavia) (India)	Đorđe Dunđerski; Sri-Krishna Prasada	2; 6	5; 7	2; 6
2	(Kingdom of Yugoslavia) (India)	Iván Balás; Hassan Ali Fyzee	4; 6	2; 6	1; 6
3	(Kingdom of Yugoslavia) (India)	Iván Balás / Đorđe Dunđerski; Hassan Ali Fyzee / Sri-Krishna Prasada	1; 6	2; 6	4; 6
4	(Kingdom of Yugoslavia) (India)	Đorđe Dunđerski; Hassan Ali Fyzee						not played
5	(Kingdom of Yugoslavia) (India)	Iván Balás; Sri-Krishna Prasada						not played

=== Czechoslovakia vs. Greece ===
Czechoslovakia
4
Prague, Czechoslovakia
6–8 May 1927

Greece
1

			1	2	3	4	5
1	(Czechoslovakia) (Greece)	Jan Koželuh; Kimon Zachos	6; 0	6; 1	6; 1
2	(Czechoslovakia) (Greece)	Ernst Gottlieb; Augustos Zerlendis	5; 7	7; 5	6; 4	7; 9	2; 6
3	(Czechoslovakia) (Greece)	Jan Koželuh / Ladislav Žemla; Kimon Zachos / Augustos Zerlendis	6; 2	6; 3	6; 4
4	(Czechoslovakia) (Greece)	František Sojka; Kimon Zachos	6; 4	6; 3	6; 2
5	(Czechoslovakia) (Greece)	Jan Koželuh; Augustos Zerlendis	6; 2	6; 1	6; 3

=== Belgium vs. Poland ===
Belgium
5
Brussels, Belgium
20–22 May 1927

Poland
0

			1	2	3	4	5
1	(Belgium) (Poland)	Jean Washer; Edward Kleinadel	6; 0	6; 0	6; 1
2	(Belgium) (Poland)	Willard Botsford; Stanisław Czetwertyński	6; 2	7; 5	4; 6	6; 2
3	(Belgium) (Poland)	Willard Botsford / Jean Washer; Edward Kleinadel / Jerzy Stolarow	8; 6	9; 7	6; 1
4	(Belgium) (Poland)	Jean Washer; Stanisław Czetwertyński	6; 2	6; 2	6; 2
5	(Belgium) (Poland)	Willard Botsford; Edward Kleinadel	6; 3	9; 7	6; 2

== Quarterfinals ==
=== Italy vs. France ===
Italy
2
Rome Lawn Tennis Club, Rome, Italy
11–13 June 1927
Clay

France
3

			1	2	3	4	5
1	(Italy) (France)	Uberto De Morpurgo; René Lacoste	6; 2	0; 6	2; 6	6; 0	1; 6
2	(Italy) (France)	Giorgio de Stefani; Henri Cochet	1; 6	3; 6	3; 6
3	(Italy) (France)	Uberto De Morpurgo / Giorgio de Stefani; Jacques Brugnon / Henri Cochet	6; 4	6; 4	6; 4
4	(Italy) (France)	Uberto De Morpurgo; Henri Cochet	7; 5	5; 7	6; 1	7; 5
5	(Italy) (France)	Giorgio de Stefani; René Lacoste	3; 6	8; 6	1; 6	3; 6

=== Germany vs. South Africa ===
Germany
1
Berlin, Germany
10–12 June 1927

South Africa
4

			1	2	3	4	5
1	(Germany) (South Africa)	Heinz Landmann; Louis Raymond	5; 7	6; 8	2; 6
2	(Germany) (South Africa)	Otto Froitzheim; Patrick Spence	6; 2	4; 6	3; 6	6; 4	5; 7
3	(Germany) (South Africa)	Heinrich Kleinschroth / Heinz Landmann; Jack Condon / Louis Raymond	5; 7	4; 6	11; 9	3; 6
4	(Germany) (South Africa)	Hans Moldenhauer; Jack Condon	4; 6	6; 3	6; 3	3; 6	6; 4
5	(Germany) (South Africa)	Heinz Landmann; Patrick Spence	3; 6	8; 6	4; 6	6; 1	2; 6

=== Denmark vs. India ===
Denmark
5
Copenhagen, Denmark
9–11 June 1927

India
0

			1	2	3	4	5
1	(Denmark) (India)	Axel Petersen; Sri-Krishna Prasada	6; 4	6; 4	6; 3
2	(Denmark) (India)	Einer Ulrich; Hassan Ali Fyzee	1; 6	6; 3	9; 7	11; 9
3	(Denmark) (India)	Povl Henriksen / Einer Ulrich; Hassan Ali Fyzee / Sri-Krishna Prasada	6; 2	6; 2	6; 3
4	(Denmark) (India)	Einer Ulrich; Sri-Krishna Prasada	6; 4	7; 5	6; 4
5	(Denmark) (India)	Axel Petersen; Hassan Ali Fyzee	6; 0	6; 2	6; 4

=== Czechoslovakia vs. Belgium ===
Czechoslovakia
4
Prague, Czechoslovakia
10–12 June 1927

Belgium
1

			1	2	3	4	5
1	(Czechoslovakia) (Belgium)	Jan Koželuh; Jean Washer	2; 6	3; 6	7; 5	8; 6	6; 0
2	(Czechoslovakia) (Belgium)	Friedrich Rohrer; Willard Botsford	6; 2	6; 3	4; 6	6; 4
3	(Czechoslovakia) (Belgium)	Jan Koželuh / Ladislav Žemla; Willard Botsford / Jean Washer	8; 6	10; 8	6; 4
4	(Czechoslovakia) (Belgium)	Jan Koželuh; Willard Botsford	6; 3	6; 2	6; 4
5	(Czechoslovakia) (Belgium)	Friedrich Rohrer; Jean Washer	4; 6	5; 7	3; 6

== Semifinals ==
=== South Africa vs. France ===
South Africa
0
Devonshire Park Lawn Tennis Club, Eastbourne, England
8–11 July 1927
Grass

France
5

			1	2	3	4	5
1	(South Africa) (France)	Jack Condon; Henri Cochet	0; 6	10; 8	2; 6	5; 7
2	(South Africa) (France)	Louis Raymond; René Lacoste	2; 6	2; 6	1; 6
3	(South Africa) (France)	Jack Condon / Louis Raymond; Jean Borotra / Jacques Brugnon	5; 7	4; 6	6; 8
4	(South Africa) (France)	Patrick Spence; Jacques Brugnon	2; 6	3; 6	4; 6
5	(South Africa) (France)	Jack Condon; René Lacoste	5; 7	3; 6	1; 6

=== Czechoslovakia vs. Denmark ===
Czechoslovakia
2
Prague, Czechoslovakia
8–10 July 1927

Denmark
3

			1	2	3	4	5
1	(Czechoslovakia) (Denmark)	Friedrich Rohrer; Axel Petersen	5; 7	1; 6	6; 4	10; 8	3; 6
2	(Czechoslovakia) (Denmark)	Jan Koželuh; Einer Ulrich	0; 6	6; 1	7; 5	6; 4
3	(Czechoslovakia) (Denmark)	Jan Koželuh / Ladislav Žemla; Axel Petersen / Einer Ulrich	6; 3	6; 4	6; 8	5; 7	7; 9
4	(Czechoslovakia) (Denmark)	Jan Koželuh; Axel Petersen	6; 4	12; 10	6; 3
5	(Czechoslovakia) (Denmark)	Friedrich Rohrer; Einer Ulrich	4; 6	4; 6	8; 10

== Final ==
=== Denmark vs. France ===
Denmark
0
Copenhagen, Denmark
21–22 July 1927
Clay

France
3

			1	2	3	4	5
1	(Denmark) (France)	Einer Ulrich; Henri Cochet	7; 9	7; 9	4; 6
2	(Denmark) (France)	Axel Petersen; Jean Borotra	8; 6	2; 6	1; 6	0; 6
3	(Denmark) (France)	Axel Petersen / Einer Ulrich; Jean Borotra / Jacques Brugnon	4; 6	0; 6	3; 6
4	(Denmark) (France)	Einer Ulrich; Jean Borotra						not played
5	(Denmark) (France)	Axel Petersen; Henri Cochet						not played
