= 1936 International Lawn Tennis Challenge Europe Zone =

International tennis competition

Details
- Duration: 24 April 1936 – 12 July 1936
- Teams: 19
- Categories: 1936 Europe Zone; 1936 America Zone

Champion
- Winning nation: Germany; Qualified for: 1936 Inter-Zonal Final

The Europe Zone was one of the two regional zones of the 1936 International Lawn Tennis Challenge.

19 teams entered the Europe Zone, with the winner going on to compete in the Inter-Zonal Final against the winner of the America Zone. Germany defeated Yugoslavia in the final, and went on to face Australia in the Inter-Zonal Final.

== Draw ==
First Round; 24 April–3 May
Barcelona, Spain (clay)
Spain	1
Germany	4
Monte Carlo, Monaco
Netherlands	3
Monaco	2
Paris, France (clay)
France	5
Taiwan	0

Second Round; 8–17 May
Dublin, Ireland (grass)
Ireland	4
Sweden	1
Montreux, Switzerland
Switzerland	5
Denmark	0
Athens, Greece
Greece	1
Argentina	4
Düsseldorf, Germany
Hungary	0
Germany	5
Scheveningen, Netherlands (clay)
Netherlands	1
France	4
Zagreb, Yugoslavia
Yugoslavia	3
Czechoslovakia	2
Oslo, Norway (clay)
Norway	2
Belgium	3
Vienna, Austria
Austria	3
Poland	2

Quarterfinals; 4–7 June
Dublin, Ireland (grass)
Ireland	3
Switzerland	2
Berlin, Germany
Argentina	1
Germany	4
Paris, France (clay)
France	2
Yugoslavia	3
Vienna, Austria
Belgium	1
Austria	4

Semifinals; 12–15 June
Berlin, Germany
Ireland	0
Germany	5
Vienna, Austria
Yugoslavia	4
Austria	1

Final; 10–12 July
Zagreb, Yugoslavia
Germany	3
Yugoslavia	0

== First round ==
=== Spain vs. Germany ===
Spain
1
Real Club de Tenis Barcelona, Barcelona, Spain
24–26 April 1936
Clay

Germany
4

			1	2	3	4	5
1	(Spain) (Germany)	Manuel Alonso Areizaga; Gottfried von Cramm	3; 6	4; 6	3; 6
2	(Spain) (Germany)	Enrique Maier; Henner Henkel	4; 6	5; 7	6; 8
3	(Spain) (Germany)	Juan Manuel Blanc / Enrique Maier; Gottfried von Cramm / Kay Lund	3; 6	3; 6	7; 9
4	(Spain) (Germany)	Enrique Maier; Gottfried von Cramm	6; 3	6; 2	6; 1
5	(Spain) (Germany)	Manuel Alonso Areizaga; Henner Henkel	2; 6	3; 6	4; 6

=== Monaco vs. Netherlands ===
Monaco
2
Monte Carlo, Monaco
1–3 May 1936

Netherlands
3

			1	2	3	4	5
1	(Monaco) (Netherlands)	Vladimir Landau; Tod Hughan	3; 6	7; 5	2; 6	1; 6
2	(Monaco) (Netherlands)	René Gallèpe; Hendrik Timmer	3; 6	2; 6	1; 6
3	(Monaco) (Netherlands)	René Gallèpe / Vladimir Landau; Tod Hughan / Willem Karsten	6; 4	7; 5	3; 6	7; 5
4	(Monaco) (Netherlands)	Vladimir Landau; Hendrik Timmer	2; 6	3; 6	6; 8
5	(Monaco) (Netherlands)	René Gallèpe; Tod Hughan	6; 2	6; 4	6; 3

=== France vs. China ===
France
5
Stade Roland Garros, Paris, France
1–3 May 1936
Clay

Taiwan
0

			1	2	3	4	5
1	(France) (Taiwan)	Christian Boussus; Kho Sin-Kie	6; 0	6; 0	6; 1
2	(France) (Taiwan)	Bernard Destremau; Guy Cheng	6; 1	6; 3	6; 8	6; 3
3	(France) (Taiwan)	Marcel Bernard / Jean Borotra; Kho Sin-Kie / Lum Pao-Hua	6; 1	6; 3	4; 6	6; 2
4	(France) (Taiwan)	Christian Boussus; Guy Cheng	6; 0	6; 0	6; 2
5	(France) (Taiwan)	Bernard Destremau; Kho Sin-Kie	6; 3	6; 2	4; 6	6; 2

== Second round ==
=== Ireland vs. Sweden ===
Ireland
4
Fitzwilliam Lawn Tennis Club, Dublin, Ireland
14–16 May 1936
Grass

Sweden
1

			1	2	3	4	5
1	(Republic of Ireland) (Sweden)	George Lyttleton-Rogers; Kalle Schröder	9; 7	2; 6	1; 6	6; 3	6; 4
2	(Republic of Ireland) (Sweden)	George McVeagh; Curt Östberg	6; 4	6; 4	6; 4
3	(Republic of Ireland) (Sweden)	George Lyttleton-Rogers / George McVeagh; Curt Östberg / Kalle Schröder	6; 3	2; 6	7; 9	5; 7
4	(Republic of Ireland) (Sweden)	George McVeagh; Kalle Schröder	2; 6	7; 5	6; 3	6; 3
5	(Republic of Ireland) (Sweden)	George Lyttleton-Rogers; Curt Östberg	0; 6	6; 2	6; 4	6; 3

=== Switzerland vs. Denmark ===
Switzerland
5
Montreux, Switzerland
15–17 May 1936

Denmark
0

			1	2	3	4	5
1	(Switzerland) (Denmark)	Max Ellmer; Helge Plougmann	6; 1	6; 4	6; 1
2	(Switzerland) (Denmark)	Hector Fisher; Niels Korner	6; 2	6; 1	6; 0
3	(Switzerland) (Denmark)	Boris Maneff / Werner Steiner; Helge Plougmann / Einer Ulrich	6; 1	6; 3	11; 9
4	(Switzerland) (Denmark)	Max Ellmer; Niels Korner	6; 3	6; 0	3; 6	6; 0
5	(Switzerland) (Denmark)	Hector Fisher; Helge Plougmann	6; 0	7; 5	4; 6	6; 8	6; 1

=== Greece vs. Argentina ===
Greece
1
Athens, Greece
8–10 May 1936

Argentina
4

			1	2	3	4	5
1	(Greece) (Argentina)	Lazaros Stalios; Adriano Zappa	6; 4	6; 3	6; 4
2	(Greece) (Argentina)	Georgios Nikolaides; Lucilo del Castillo	4; 6	0; 6	1; 6
3	(Greece) (Argentina)	Georgios Nikolaides / Lazaros Stalios; Lucilo del Castillo / Adriano Zappa	6; 4	1; 6	1; 6	2; 6
4	(Greece) (Argentina)	Georgios Nikolaides; Adriano Zappa	3; 6	1; 6	7; 5	1; 6
5	(Greece) (Argentina)	Lazaros Stalios; Lucilo del Castillo	2; 6	4; 6	7; 9

=== Germany vs. Hungary ===
Germany
5
Düsseldorf, Germany
15–17 May 1936

Hungary
0

			1	2	3	4	5
1	(Germany) (Hungary)	Gottfried von Cramm; Emil Gábori	6; 3	6; 2	6; 3
2	(Germany) (Hungary)	Henner Henkel; György Dallos	6; 1	6; 1	6; 2
3	(Germany) (Hungary)	Gottfried von Cramm / Kay Lund; Emil Ferenczy / Emil Gábori	6; 3	7; 5	6; 0
4	(Germany) (Hungary)	Gottfried von Cramm; György Dallos	6; 1	7; 5	6; 3
5	(Germany) (Hungary)	Henner Henkel; Emil Gábori	8; 6	6; 3	7; 5

=== Netherlands vs. France ===
Netherlands
1
Scheveningen, Netherlands
9–11 May 1936
Clay

France
4

			1	2	3	4	5
1	(Netherlands) (France)	Hendrik Timmer; Christian Boussus	6; 3	6; 3	6; 1
2	(Netherlands) (France)	Tod Hughan; Bernard Destremau	4; 6	6; 3	6; 3	4; 6	1; 6
3	(Netherlands) (France)	Willem Karsten / Hendrik Timmer; Marcel Bernard / Jean Borotra	1; 6	3; 6	8; 6	2; 6
4	(Netherlands) (France)	Tod Hughan; Christian Boussus	6; 3	8; 10	2; 6	0; 6
5	(Netherlands) (France)	Hendrik Timmer; Bernard Destremau	6; 0	1; 6	3; 6	2; 6

=== Yugoslavia vs. Czechoslovakia ===
Yugoslavia
3
Zagreb, Yugoslavia
15–17 May 1936

Czechoslovakia
2

			1	2	3	4	5
1	(Kingdom of Yugoslavia) (Czechoslovakia)	Franjo Punčec; Josef Šíba	6; 1	6; 2	2; 6	6; 0
2	(Kingdom of Yugoslavia) (Czechoslovakia)	Josip Palada; Ladislav Hecht	6; 8	1; 6	6; 2	2; 6
3	(Kingdom of Yugoslavia) (Czechoslovakia)	Franjo Kukuljević / Franjo Punčec; Ladislav Hecht / Ferenc Maršálek	6; 4	7; 9	6; 2	3; 6	4; 6
4	(Kingdom of Yugoslavia) (Czechoslovakia)	Franjo Punčec; Ladislav Hecht	6; 3	4; 6	1; 6	6; 4	6; 2
5	(Kingdom of Yugoslavia) (Czechoslovakia)	Josip Palada; Josef Šíba	6; 3	6; 2	6; 4

=== Norway vs. Belgium ===
Norway
2
Oslo, Norway
14–16 May 1936
Clay

Belgium
3

			1	2	3	4	5
1	(Norway) (Belgium)	Johan Haanes; André Lacroix	6; 4	3; 6	0; 6	2; 6
2	(Norway) (Belgium)	Fritz Jenssen; Pierre Geelhand de Merxem	8; 6	4; 6	6; 2	6; 4
3	(Norway) (Belgium)	Johan Haanes / Fritz Jenssen; Léopold de Borman / André Lacroix	4; 6	2; 6	9; 7	3; 6
4	(Norway) (Belgium)	Fritz Jenssen; André Lacroix	5; 7	2; 6	4; 6
5	(Norway) (Belgium)	Johan Haanes; Jacques Van den Eynde	6; 4	2; 6	8; 6	6; 2

=== Austria vs. Poland ===
Austria
3
Vienna, Austria
15–17 May 1936

Poland
2

			1	2	3	4	5
1	(Austria) (Poland)	Adam Baworowski; Ignacy Tłoczyński	6; 4	6; 3	6; 3
2	(Austria) (Poland)	Georg von Metaxa; Józef Hebda	4; 6	5; 7	4; 6
3	(Austria) (Poland)	Adam Baworowski / Georg von Metaxa; Józef Hebda / Kazimierz Tarlowski	6; 1	6; 2	6; 4
4	(Austria) (Poland)	Adam Baworowski; Józef Hebda	0; 6	6; 2	6; 4	1; 6	5; 7
5	(Austria) (Poland)	Georg von Metaxa; Ignacy Tłoczyński	6; 4	6; 8	3; 6	7; 5	6; 3

== Quarterfinals ==
=== Ireland vs. Switzerland ===
Ireland
3
Fitzwilliam Lawn Tennis Club, Dublin, Ireland
4–6 June 1936
Grass

Switzerland
2

			1	2	3	4	5
1	(Republic of Ireland) (Switzerland)	George Lyttleton-Rogers; Boris Maneff	6; 2	6; 3	3; 6	3; 6	6; 0
2	(Republic of Ireland) (Switzerland)	George McVeagh; Hector Fisher	1; 6	6; 3	8; 6	0; 6	2; 6
3	(Republic of Ireland) (Switzerland)	George Lyttleton-Rogers / George McVeagh; Hector Fisher / Werner Steiner	5; 7	6; 4	6; 1	6; 4
4	(Republic of Ireland) (Switzerland)	George Lyttleton-Rogers; Hector Fisher	6; 3	2; 6	3; 6	2; 6
5	(Republic of Ireland) (Switzerland)	George McVeagh; Max Ellmer	6; 3	4; 6	6; 4	11; 9

=== Germany vs. Argentina ===
Germany
4
Berlin, Germany
5–7 June 1936

Argentina
1

			1	2	3	4	5
1	(Germany) (Argentina)	Gottfried von Cramm; Lucilo del Castillo	6; 0	4; 6	6; 4	6; 1
2	(Germany) (Argentina)	Henner Henkel; Adriano Zappa	6; 1	6; 1	6; 3
3	(Germany) (Argentina)	Gottfried von Cramm / Henner Henkel; Lucilo del Castillo / Adriano Zappa	6; 1	6; 2	6; 3
4	(Germany) (Argentina)	Hans Denker; Adriano Zappa	6; 3	0; 6	6; 2	1; 6	1; 6
5	(Germany) (Argentina)	Henner Henkel; Lucilo del Castillo	6; 0	6; 1	6; 1

=== France vs. Yugoslavia ===
France
2
Stade Roland Garros, Paris, France
5–7 June 1936
Clay

Yugoslavia
3

			1	2	3	4	5
1	(France) (Kingdom of Yugoslavia)	Christian Boussus; Josip Palada	2; 6	6; 2	3; 6	2; 6
2	(France) (Kingdom of Yugoslavia)	Bernard Destremau; Franjo Punčec	3; 6	6; 2	7; 5	0; 6	9; 7
3	(France) (Kingdom of Yugoslavia)	Marcel Bernard / Jean Borotra; Franjo Kukuljević / Dragutin Mitić	8; 6	7; 5	4; 6	3; 6	6; 2
4	(France) (Kingdom of Yugoslavia)	Bernard Destremau; Josip Palada	1; 6	6; 1	6; 8	4; 6
5	(France) (Kingdom of Yugoslavia)	Christian Boussus; Franjo Punčec	6; 3	1; 6	6; 4	5; 7	1; 6

=== Austria vs. Belgium ===
Austria
4
Vienna, Austria
5–7 June 1936

Belgium
1

			1	2	3	4	5
1	(Austria) (Belgium)	Georg von Metaxa; André Lacroix	3; 6	6; 3	6; 4	2; 6	6; 3
2	(Austria) (Belgium)	Adam Baworowski; Jacques Van den Eynde	6; 3	3; 6	4; 6	6; 3	6; 2
3	(Austria) (Belgium)	Adam Baworowski / Georg von Metaxa; Léopold de Borman / André Lacroix	6; 2	6; 8	5; 7	3; 6
4	(Austria) (Belgium)	Georg von Metaxa; Jacques Van den Eynde	6; 3	4; 6	6; 3	6; 2
5	(Austria) (Belgium)	Adam Baworowski; André Lacroix	6; 4	6; 3	11; 9

== Semifinals ==
=== Germany vs. Ireland ===
Germany
5
Berlin, Germany
12–14 June 1936

Ireland
0

			1	2	3	4	5
1	(Germany) (Republic of Ireland)	Gottfried von Cramm; George Lyttleton-Rogers	6; 1	6; 2	6; 3
2	(Germany) (Republic of Ireland)	Henner Henkel; George McVeagh	6; 1	8; 6	6; 2
3	(Germany) (Republic of Ireland)	Gottfried von Cramm / Henner Henkel; George Lyttleton-Rogers / George McVeagh	6; 0	6; 1	6; 4
4	(Germany) (Republic of Ireland)	Henner Henkel; George Lyttleton-Rogers	6; 2	6; 0	6; 0
5	(Germany) (Republic of Ireland)	Gottfried von Cramm; George McVeagh	6; 2	6; 3	6; 1

=== Austria vs. Yugoslavia ===
Austria
1
Vienna, Austria
13–15 June 1936

Yugoslavia
4

			1	2	3	4	5
1	(Austria) (Kingdom of Yugoslavia)	Georg von Metaxa; Franjo Punčec	4; 6	3; 6	1; 6
2	(Austria) (Kingdom of Yugoslavia)	Adam Baworowski; Josip Palada	6; 3	4; 6	3; 6	6; 3	5; 7
3	(Austria) (Kingdom of Yugoslavia)	Adam Baworowski / Georg von Metaxa; Franjo Kukuljević / Dragutin Mitić	4; 6	6; 3	6; 4	4; 6	6; 2
4	(Austria) (Kingdom of Yugoslavia)	Georg von Metaxa; Josip Palada	6; 8	3; 6	6; 2	6; 3	4; 6
5	(Austria) (Kingdom of Yugoslavia)	Adam Baworowski; Franjo Kukuljević	7; 5	4; 6	6; 1	2; 6	3; 6

== Final ==
=== Yugoslavia vs. Germany ===
Yugoslavia
0
Zagreb, Yugoslavia
10–12 July 1936

Germany
3

			1	2	3	4	5
1	(Kingdom of Yugoslavia) (Germany)	Josip Palada; Gottfried von Cramm	4; 6	2; 6	8; 6	2; 6
2	(Kingdom of Yugoslavia) (Germany)	Franjo Punčec; Henner Henkel	1; 6	2; 6	4; 6
3	(Kingdom of Yugoslavia) (Germany)	Franjo Kukuljević / Dragutin Mitić; Gottfried von Cramm / Henner Henkel	6; 8	6; 4	3; 6	6; 4	3; 6
4	(Kingdom of Yugoslavia) (Germany)	Franjo Punčec; Gottfried von Cramm						not played
5	(Kingdom of Yugoslavia) (Germany)	Josip Palada; Henner Henkel						not played
