= 1936 International Lawn Tennis Challenge America Zone =

The America Zone was one of the two regional zones of the 1936 International Lawn Tennis Challenge.

Due to the low number of competing South American teams, the North & Central America and South America Zones were scrapped and the Americas played in one unified zone. 4 teams entered the Americas Zone, with the winner going on to compete in the Inter-Zonal Final against the winner of the Europe Zone. Australia defeated United States in the final, and went on to face Germany in the Inter-Zonal Final.

== Draw ==
Semifinals; 10–12 April
Australia	w/o
Cuba
Houston, TX, United States (clay)
United States	5
Mexico	0

Final; 30 May–1 June
Philadelphia, PA, United States (grass)
Australia	3
United States	2

== Semifinals ==
=== United States vs. Mexico ===
United States
5
River Oaks Country Club, Houston, TX, United States
10–12 April 1936
Clay

Mexico
0

			1	2	3	4	5
1	(United States) (Mexico)	Don Budge; Esteban Reyes	6; 3	6; 1	6; 1
2	(United States) (Mexico)	Bryan Grant; Daniel Hernández	3; 6	6; 2	6; 3	6; 3
3	(United States) (Mexico)	Wilmer Allison / John Van Ryn; Marco Antonio Mestre / Flavio Martínez	6; 0	6; 1	6; 2
4	(United States) (Mexico)	Don Budge; Daniel Hernández	6; 1	6; 1	6; 3
5	(United States) (Mexico)	Bryan Grant; Esteban Reyes	6; 4	13; 11	6; 2

== Final ==
=== United States vs. Australia ===
United States
2
Germantown Cricket Club, Philadelphia, PA, United States
30 May–1 June 1936
Grass

Australia
3

			1	2	3	4	5
1	(United States) (Australia)	Wilmer Allison; Adrian Quist	3; 6	7; 5	4; 6	1; 6
2	(United States) (Australia)	Don Budge; Jack Crawford	6; 2	6; 3	4; 6	1; 6	13; 11
3	(United States) (Australia)	Don Budge / Gene Mako; Jack Crawford / Adrian Quist	6; 4	6; 2	4; 6	5; 7	4; 6
4	(United States) (Australia)	Wilmer Allison; Jack Crawford	6; 4	3; 6	6; 4	2; 6	2; 6
5	(United States) (Australia)	Don Budge; Adrian Quist	6; 2	6; 2	6; 4
