= 1927 International Lawn Tennis Challenge America Zone =

The America Zone was one of the two regional zones of the 1927 International Lawn Tennis Challenge.

4 teams entered the America Zone, with the winner going on to compete in the Inter-Zonal Final against the winner of the Europe Zone. Japan defeated Canada in the final, and went on to face France in the Inter-Zonal Final.

== Draw ==
Semifinals; 18–31 July
St. Louis, MO, United States (grass)
Japan	4
Mexico	1
Toronto, Canada (clay)
Canada	3
Cuba	2

Final; 18–20 August
Montreal, Canada (grass)
Japan	3
Canada	2

== Semifinals ==
=== Japan vs. Mexico ===
Japan
4
Triple A Club, St. Louis, MO, United States
29–31 July 1927
Grass

Mexico
1

			1	2	3	4	5
1	(Japan) (Mexico)	Yoshiro Ota; Robert Kinsey	2; 6	1; 6	6; 4	6; 1	6; 2
2	(Japan) (Mexico)	Takeichi Harada; Alfonso Unda	6; 2	6; 3	6; 3
3	(Japan) (Mexico)	Takeichi Harada / Zenzo Shimizu; Claude Butlin / Robert Kinsey	7; 5	6; 2	2; 6	3; 6	6; 3
4	(Japan) (Mexico)	Yoshiro Ota; Alfonso Unda	6; 1	4; 6	6; 3	6; 4
5	(Japan) (Mexico)	Takeichi Harada; Robert Kinsey	9; 7	6; 0	0; 6	6; 1

=== Canada vs. Cuba ===
Canada
3
Toronto Lawn Tennis Club, Toronto, Canada
18–20 July 1927
Clay

Cuba
2

			1	2	3	4	5
1	(Canada) (Cuba)	Jack Wright; Vicente Banet	2; 6	6; 2	6; 4	4; 6	6; 4
2	(Canada) (Cuba)	Willard Crocker; Rogelio Paris	6; 4	8; 6	6; 4
3	(Canada) (Cuba)	Willard Crocker / Jack Wright; Raúl Chacón / Rogelio Paris	6; 0	6; 3	6; 0
4	(Canada) (Cuba)	Gilbert Nunns; Vicente Banet	3; 6	2; 6	7; 5	3; 6
5	(Canada) (Cuba)	Jack Wright; Rogelio Paris	6; 1	6; 2	5; 7	5; 7	4; 6

== Final ==
=== Canada vs. Japan ===
Canada
2
Mount Royal Tennis Club, Montreal, Canada
18–20 August 1927
Grass

Japan
3

			1	2	3	4	5
1	(Canada) (Japan)	Willard Crocker; Takeichi Harada	5; 7	0; 6	4; 6
2	(Canada) (Japan)	Jack Wright; Yoshiro Ota	6; 3	6; 4	6; 4
3	(Canada) (Japan)	Willard Crocker / Jack Wright; Takeichi Harada / Teizo Toba	3; 6	6; 4	5; 7	6; 3	8; 10
4	(Canada) (Japan)	Jack Wright; Takeichi Harada	6; 3	6; 3	8; 6
5	(Canada) (Japan)	Willard Crocker; Yoshiro Ota	4; 6	6; 3	8; 10	3; 6
