= Juan Manuel Blanc =

Spanish tennis player (1917–1983)

- Full name: Juan Manuel Blanc Bertrand
- Country (sports): Spain
- Born: 1917; Barcelona, Spain
- Died: 17 October 1983 (aged 66); Barcelona, Spain
- Plays: Right-handed (one-handed backhand)

Juan Manuel Blanc (1917 – 17 October 1983) was a male Spanish tennis player who was mainly active in the 1930s and 1940s.

== Playing career ==
Born in Barcelona in 1917, Blanc began his tennis career at his hometown club Real Club de Tenis Barcelona, where he specialized in doubles. Between 1935 and 1941, he won four national titles, two in singles (1940 and 1941), and another two in doubles (1935 and 1941), and would likely have won more if not for the Spanish Civil War (1936–39). He was also the champion of Catalonia in singles in 1940 and won four Catalan championships in doubles (1934, 1935, 1942, and 1949).

Blanc also participated in a Davis Cup qualifier in April 1936, partnering with Enrique Maier, being defeated by the Germans Gottfried von Cramm and Kai Lund.

== Later life ==
After he retired from the courts, Blanc remained linked to the world of tennis, being the captain of the Spain Davis Cup team in 1959. Blanc served for several years as secretary of the Royal Spanish Tennis Federation, and he was also a director of the Real Barcelona Tennis Club. He was also part of the board of directors of FC Barcelona between 1965 and 1969, under the presidency of Enric Llaudet.

== Death ==
Blanc died in Barcelona on 17 October 1983, at the age of 66.
