= Pedro Masip =

Spanish tennis player (1918–2001)

- Country (sports): Spain
- Born: 8 October 1918; Barcelona, Spain
- Died: 28 June 2001 (aged 82)
- Plays: Right-handed

Pedro Masip Saura (8 October 1918 – 28 June 2001) was a Spanish tennis player who competed in the early postwar years.

== Life ==
Masip was born in Barcelona. His father was a caretaker for a local football club, who brought young Pedro along to help with menial tasks. It was while at the club that Ricardo Saprissa, a nationally renowned footballer and hockey player, gave Masip his first tennis racquet.

In 1936, at the age of only 17, Masip won his first Spanish National Championship in singles. The advent of the Spanish Civil War that same year, however, brought his fledgling career to a halt, and in the war's aftermath he was banned from playing tennis in Spain for five years and disqualified permanently from Davis Cup competition. While the national ban was in place, Masip chose to earn his living playing Basque pelota with his brother, successfully introducing the one-handed backhand to the sport.

Upon his return to competitive tennis in 1945, Masip won the Spanish national title a further six times in a row. He also won five doubles and three mixed national titles. The most notable of his nine top-level international titles were his victories at the 1947 Portuguese Championships, the 1948 Italian Riviera Championships and French Covered Court Championships, and the 1949 British Hardcourt Championships, all against Henri Cochet; and at the 1950 Philippines International Championships against Felicisimo Ampon.

In 1950, Masip left Spanish tennis behind and moved to Barranquilla in Colombia, only returning to Spain in 1968. In later years he continued to practice tennis at the Real Club de Polo de Barcelona, although he no longer competed in tournaments. He died in 2001.
