= David Lloyd Club Turó =

Sports club and fitness center in Barcelona, Spain

- Interactive map of David Lloyd Club Turó
- Former names: Lawn Tennis del Turó; Reial Club Tennis del Turó
- Location: Barcelona, Spain
- Coordinates: 41°22′58″N 2°6′31″E

Construction
- Opened: 1905

Website
- davidlloyd.es

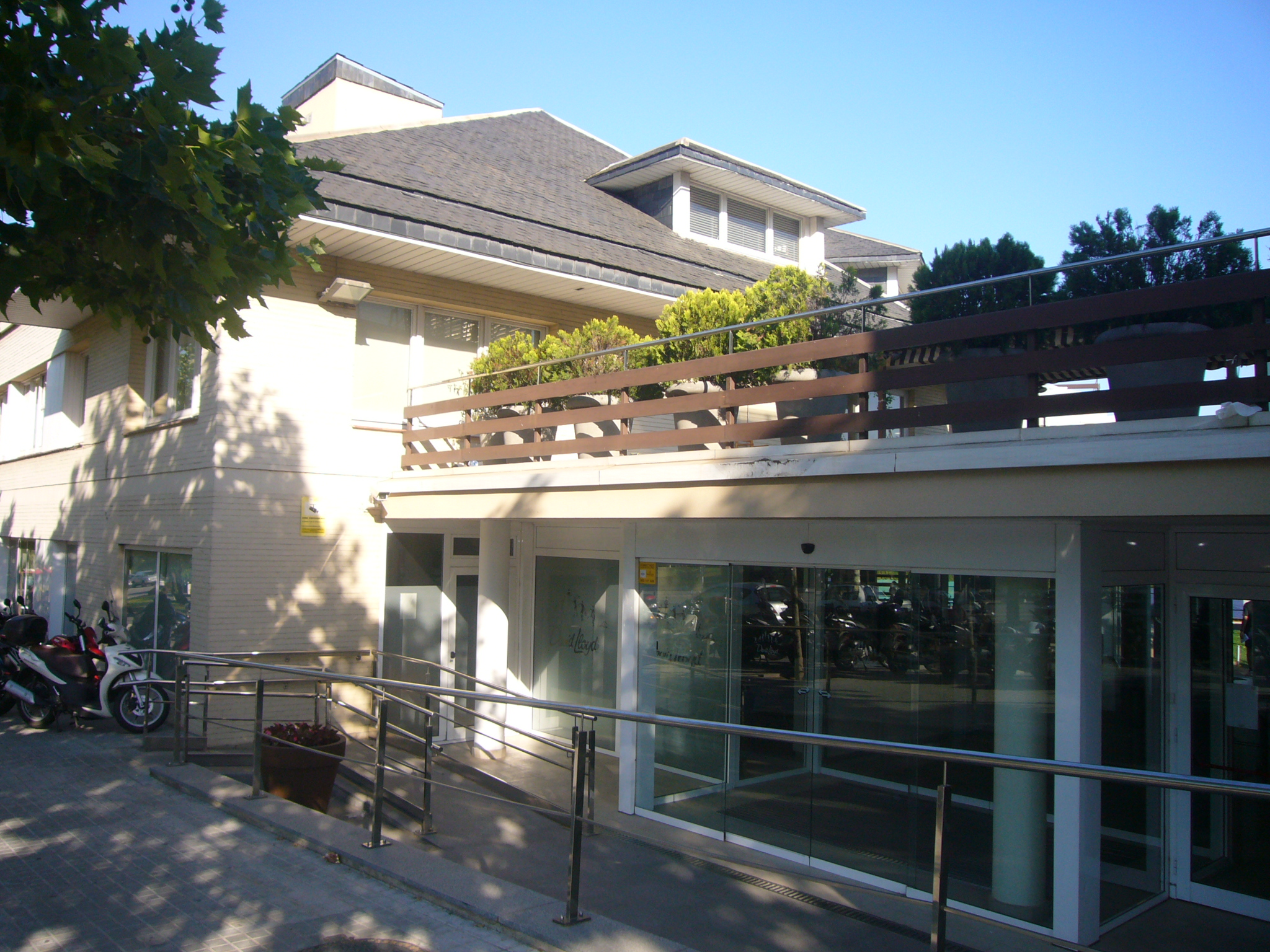
Entrance of the tennis club "David Lloyd Club Turó", in Barcelona.

David Lloyd Club Turó is a sports club and fitness center in Barcelona, Catalonia, Spain. The club hosted the Barcelona Ladies Open from 2008 to 2010. The facilities house 12 tennis courts, 12 paddle courts, gym, 5 studios, an outdoor swimming pool, and an indoor swimming pool.

== History ==
The club was founded in 1905 under the name Lawn Tennis del Turó. In 1911, the name was changed to Reial Club Tennis del Turó after its new facilities near Carrer de Descartes were inaugurated by Alfonso XIII. In 1968, it was moved to its current location on Avinguda Diagonal.

In 2003, the company David Lloyd Leisure took over the management of the club and changed the name to David Lloyd Club Turó.
