= Sant Sebastià =

Beach in Spain

Coordinates: 41.3735°N 2.1896°E

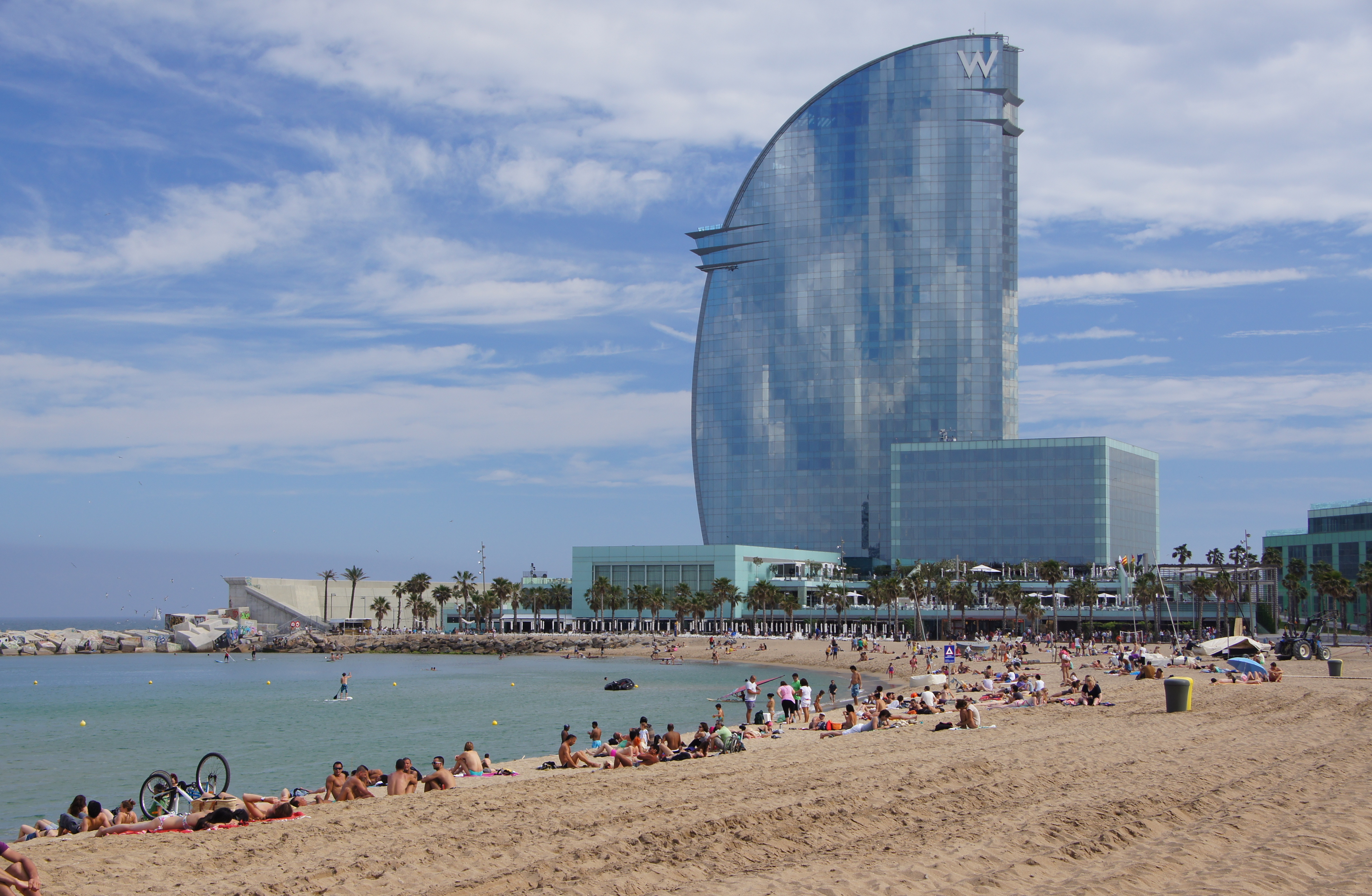
Sant Sebastià beach

Sant Sebastià beach is located in Barcelona, Catalonia, Spain. At 1,100 meters, it is the longest in Barcelona. It is located in the Barceloneta neighborhood of Ciutat Vella district.

== History ==
- This beach was used by the city's elite in the 19th century and was the first to allow men and women to swim in the same area.
- In 2004, a statue to commemorate swimming sports was built by sculptor Alfredo Sanz.
- In 2009, the far end of the beach welcomed a new and massive building, the hotel W Barcelona. It was created by Ricardo Bofill and has caused some confrontation as it has altered Barcelona's skyline.
