= 1936 International Lawn Tennis Challenge =

1936 edition of the International Lawn Tennis Challenge

Details
- Duration: 10 April – 28 July 1936
- Edition: 31st
- Teams: 23

Champion
- Winning nation: Great Britain

The 1936 International Lawn Tennis Challenge was the 31st edition of what is now known as the Davis Cup. Due to the low number of competing South American teams, the North & Central America and South America Zones were scrapped and the Americas played in one unified zone. From this edition, the Qualifying Round system of the Europe Zone was scrapped. 19 teams entered the Europe Zone (including Argentina, the only South American team to enter), while 4 teams entered the Americas Zone.

Australia defeated the United States in the Americas Zone final, while in the Europe Zone final Germany defeated Yugoslavia. The Australians then defeated Germany in the Inter-Zonal play-off, but would fall to Great Britain in the Challenge Round. The final was played at the All England Club Centre Court in Wimbledon, London, England on 25–28 July.

== America Zone ==
=== Draw ===
Semifinals; 10–12 April
Australia	w/o
Cuba
Houston, TX, United States (clay)
United States	5
Mexico	0

Final; 30 May–1 June
Philadelphia, PA, United States (grass)
Australia	3
United States	2

=== Final ===
United States vs. Australia

United States
2
Germantown Cricket Club, Philadelphia, PA, United States
30 May–1 June 1936
Grass

Australia
3

			1	2	3	4	5
1	(United States) (Australia)	Wilmer Allison; Adrian Quist	3; 6	7; 5	4; 6	1; 6
2	(United States) (Australia)	Don Budge; Jack Crawford	6; 2	6; 3	4; 6	1; 6	13; 11
3	(United States) (Australia)	Don Budge / Gene Mako; Jack Crawford / Adrian Quist	6; 4	6; 2	4; 6	5; 7	4; 6
4	(United States) (Australia)	Wilmer Allison; Jack Crawford	6; 4	3; 6	6; 4	2; 6	2; 6
5	(United States) (Australia)	Don Budge; Adrian Quist	6; 2	6; 2	6; 4

== Europe Zone ==
=== Draw ===
First Round; 24 April–3 May
Barcelona, Spain (clay)
Spain	1
Germany	4
Monte Carlo, Monaco
Netherlands	3
Monaco	2
Paris, France (clay)
France	5
Taiwan	0

Second Round; 8–17 May
Dublin, Ireland (grass)
Ireland	4
Sweden	1
Montreux, Switzerland
Switzerland	5
Denmark	0
Athens, Greece
Greece	1
Argentina	4
Düsseldorf, Germany
Hungary	0
Germany	5
Scheveningen, Netherlands (clay)
Netherlands	1
France	4
Zagreb, Yugoslavia
Yugoslavia	3
Czechoslovakia	2
Oslo, Norway (clay)
Norway	2
Belgium	3
Vienna, Austria
Austria	3
Poland	2

Quarterfinals; 4–7 June
Dublin, Ireland (grass)
Ireland	3
Switzerland	2
Berlin, Germany
Argentina	1
Germany	4
Paris, France (clay)
France	2
Yugoslavia	3
Vienna, Austria
Belgium	1
Austria	4

Semifinals; 12–15 June
Berlin, Germany
Ireland	0
Germany	5
Vienna, Austria
Yugoslavia	4
Austria	1

Final; 10–12 July
Zagreb, Yugoslavia
Germany	3
Yugoslavia	0

=== Final ===
Yugoslavia vs. Germany

Yugoslavia
0
Zagreb, Yugoslavia
10–12 July 1936

Germany
3

			1	2	3	4	5
1	(Kingdom of Yugoslavia) (Germany)	Josip Palada; Gottfried von Cramm	4; 6	2; 6	8; 6	2; 6
2	(Kingdom of Yugoslavia) (Germany)	Franjo Punčec; Henner Henkel	1; 6	2; 6	4; 6
3	(Kingdom of Yugoslavia) (Germany)	Franjo Kukuljević / Dragutin Mitić; Gottfried von Cramm / Henner Henkel	6; 8	6; 4	3; 6	6; 4	3; 6
4	(Kingdom of Yugoslavia) (Germany)	Franjo Punčec; Gottfried von Cramm						not played
5	(Kingdom of Yugoslavia) (Germany)	Josip Palada; Henner Henkel						not played

== Inter-Zonal Final ==
Australia vs. Germany

Australia
4
No. 1 Court, All England Club, Wimbledon, England
18–21 July 1936
Grass

Germany
1

			1	2	3	4	5
1	(Australia) (Germany)	Jack Crawford; Henner Henkel	6; 2	6; 2				retired
2	(Australia) (Germany)	Adrian Quist; Gottfried von Cramm	6; 4	4; 6	6; 4	4; 6	9; 11
3	(Australia) (Germany)	Jack Crawford / Vivian McGrath; Gottfried von Cramm / Henner Henkel	6; 4	4; 6	6; 4	6; 4
4	(Australia) (Germany)	Vivian McGrath; Henner Henkel	6; 3	5; 7	6; 4	6; 4
5	(Australia) (Germany)	Jack Crawford; Hans Denker	6; 3	6; 1	6; 4

== Challenge Round ==
Great Britain vs. Australia

Great Britain
3
Centre Court, All England Club, Wimbledon, England
25–28 July 1936
Grass

Australia
2

			1	2	3	4	5
1	(United Kingdom) (Australia)	Bunny Austin; Jack Crawford	4; 6	6; 3	6; 1	6; 1
2	(United Kingdom) (Australia)	Fred Perry; Adrian Quist	6; 1	4; 6	7; 5	6; 2
3	(United Kingdom) (Australia)	Pat Hughes / Raymond Tuckey; Jack Crawford / Adrian Quist	4; 6	6; 2	5; 7	8; 10
4	(United Kingdom) (Australia)	Bunny Austin; Adrian Quist	4; 6	6; 3	5; 7	2; 6
5	(United Kingdom) (Australia)	Fred Perry; Jack Crawford	6; 2	6; 3	6; 3

== See also ==
- 1936 Wightman Cup
