= Jaime Bartrolí =

Spanish tennis player and coach (1918–1989)

- Country (sports): Spain
- Born: 23 January 1918
- Died: 20 July 1989 (aged 71)
- Plays: Right-handed

Grand Slam singles results
- French Open: 2R (1948)
- Wimbledon: 2R (1949, 1953)

Jaime Bartrolí Mas (23 January 1918 – 20 July 1989) was a Spanish tennis player and coach.

Active in the 1940s and 1950s, Bartrolí won a total of 14 national doubles championships, eight in doubles and six in mixed doubles. He is a Barcelona native and was an early participant in the Trofeo Conde de Godó (modern day Barcelona Open), considered an influential figure in encouraging other players to enter the tournament.

Bartrolí played for the Spain Davis Cup team from 1946 to 1948, then for one final year in 1954. His most noted contribution to Spanish Davis Cup tennis was through his stints as non playing captain, first serving between 1956 and 1958. He led Spain to the 1965 and 1967 Davis Cup finals in his second period as captain.

== See also ==
- List of Spain Davis Cup team representatives
