= 2025 Davis Cup Finals =

Men's tennis event

- Date: 18–23 November 2025
- Edition: 6th
- Draw: 8 teams
- Surface: Hard / indoor
- Location: SuperTennis Arena, Bologna, Italy

Champions
- Italy
- Davis Cup

Two-time defending champions Italy defeated Spain in the final, 2–0 to win the 2025 Davis Cup. It was Italy's fourth Davis Cup title. Italy was the first country to win the event three consecutive times since the United States in 1972.

The Finals (also called the Final 8) were the highest level of Davis Cup competition in 2025 and were played from 18 to 23 November 2025. They featured the host nation (Italy) and the seven winners from the Qualifiers second round. The ties were contested in a best-of-three rubbers format and played on one day. There were two singles matches followed, if necessary, by a doubles match.

== Bracket ==
All matches take place on indoor hard courts at the SuperTennis Arena, Bologna, Italy.

Quarterfinals
1	Italy	2
Austria	0
3	France	0
Belgium	2
Spain	2
4	Czech Republic	1
Argentina	1
2	Germany	2

Semifinals
1	Italy	2
Belgium	0
Spain	2
2	Germany	1

Final
1	Italy	2
Spain	0

== Team nominations ==
SR = Singles ranking, DR = Doubles ranking.
Rankings are as of 17 November 2025.

Argentina
Player	SR	DR
Francisco Cerúndolo	21	296
Tomás Martín Etcheverry	60	250
Francisco Comesaña	61	903
Horacio Zeballos	–	5
Andrés Molteni	–	25
Captain: Javier Frana

Austria
Player	SR	DR
Filip Misolic	79	1109
Jurij Rodionov	177	269
Lukas Neumayer	189	641
Lucas Miedler	1508	23
Alexander Erler	–	43
Captain: Jürgen Melzer

Belgium
Player	SR	DR
Zizou Bergs	43	901
Raphaël Collignon	86	534
Alexander Blockx	116	467
Sander Gillé	–	49
Joran Vliegen	–	66
Captain: Steve Darcis

Czech Republic
Player	SR	DR
Jiří Lehečka	17	136
Jakub Menšík	19	276
Tomáš Macháč	32	118
Vít Kopřiva	102	878
Adam Pavlásek	–	53
Captain: Tomáš Berdych

France
Player	SR	DR
Arthur Rinderknech	29	327
Corentin Moutet	35	568
Giovanni Mpetshi Perricard	59	249
Benjamin Bonzi	96	156
Pierre-Hugues Herbert	154	65
Captain: Paul-Henri Mathieu

Germany
Player	SR	DR
Alexander Zverev	3	582
Jan-Lennard Struff	84	353
Yannick Hanfmann	104	–
Kevin Krawietz	–	11
Tim Pütz	–	11
Captain: Michael Kohlmann

Italy
Player	SR	DR
Flavio Cobolli	22	297
Lorenzo Sonego	39	94
Matteo Berrettini	56	347
Andrea Vavassori	341	14
Simone Bolelli	–	13
Captain: Filippo Volandri

Spain
Player	SR	DR
~~Carlos Alcaraz~~ (Note: Alcaraz withdrew due to injury shortly prior the tournament.)	1	–
Jaume Munar	36	110
Pablo Carreño Busta	89	888
Pedro Martínez	95	98
Marcel Granollers	–	6
Captain: David Ferrer

== Results ==
=== Quarterfinals ===
==== Italy vs. Austria ====
Italy
2
SuperTennis Arena, Bologna
19 November 2025

Austria
0

			1	2	3
1	(Italy) (Austria)	Matteo Berrettini; Jurij Rodionov	6; 3	7^{7} 6^{4}
2	(Italy) (Austria)	Flavio Cobolli; Filip Misolic	6; 1	6; 3
3	(Italy) (Austria)	Simone Bolelli / Andrea Vavassori; Alexander Erler / Lucas Miedler				not played

==== France vs. Belgium ====
France
0
SuperTennis Arena, Bologna
18 November 2025

Belgium
2

			1	2	3
1	(France) (Belgium)	Corentin Moutet; Raphaël Collignon	6; 2	5; 7	5; 7
2	(France) (Belgium)	Arthur Rinderknech; Zizou Bergs	3; 6	6^{4} 7^{7}
3	(France) (Belgium)	Benjamin Bonzi / Pierre-Hugues Herbert; Sander Gillé / Joran Vliegen				not played

==== Spain vs. Czech Republic ====
Spain
2
SuperTennis Arena, Bologna
20 November 2025

Czech Republic
1

			1	2	3
1	(Spain) (Czech Republic)	Pablo Carreño Busta; Jakub Menšík	5; 7	4; 6
2	(Spain) (Czech Republic)	Jaume Munar; Jiří Lehečka	6; 3	6; 4
3	(Spain) (Czech Republic)	Marcel Granollers / Pedro Martínez; Tomáš Macháč / Jakub Menšík	7^{10} 6^{8}	7^{10} 6^{8}

==== Argentina vs. Germany ====
Argentina
1
SuperTennis Arena, Bologna
20 November 2025

Germany
2

			1	2	3
1	(Argentina) (Germany)	Tomás Martín Etcheverry; Jan-Lennard Struff	7^{7} 6^{3}	7^{9} 6^{7}
2	(Argentina) (Germany)	Francisco Cerúndolo; Alexander Zverev	4; 6	6^{3} 7^{7}
3	(Argentina) (Germany)	Andrés Molteni / Horacio Zeballos; Kevin Krawietz / Tim Pütz	6; 4	4; 6	6^{10} 7^{12}

=== Semifinals ===
==== Italy vs. Belgium ====
Italy
2
SuperTennis Arena, Bologna
21 November 2025

Belgium
0

			1	2	3
1	(Italy) (Belgium)	Matteo Berrettini; Raphaël Collignon	6; 3	6; 4
2	(Italy) (Belgium)	Flavio Cobolli; Zizou Bergs	6; 3	6^{5} 7^{7}	7^{17} 6^{15}
3	(Italy) (Belgium)	Simone Bolelli / Andrea Vavassori; Sander Gillé / Joran Vliegen				not played

==== Spain vs. Germany ====
Spain
2
SuperTennis Arena, Bologna
22 November 2025

Germany
1

			1	2	3
1	(Spain) (Germany)	Pablo Carreño Busta; Jan-Lennard Struff	6; 4	7^{8} 6^{6}
2	(Spain) (Germany)	Jaume Munar; Alexander Zverev	6^{2} 7^{7}	6^{5} 7^{7}
3	(Spain) (Germany)	Marcel Granollers / Pedro Martínez; Kevin Krawietz / Tim Pütz	6; 2	3; 6	6; 3

=== Final ===
==== Italy vs. Spain ====
Italy
2
SuperTennis Arena, Bologna
23 November 2025

Spain
0

			1	2	3
1	(Italy) (Spain)	Matteo Berrettini; Pablo Carreño Busta	6; 3	6; 4
2	(Italy) (Spain)	Flavio Cobolli; Jaume Munar	1; 6	7^{7} 6^{5}	7; 5
3	(Italy) (Spain)	Simone Bolelli / Andrea Vavassori; Marcel Granollers / Pedro Martínez				not played
