= Francisco Sindreu =

Spanish tennis player (1904–1982)

Personal information
- Full name: Francisco Sindreu Pons
- Nationality: Spanish
- Born: 9 March 1904; Barcelona, Spain
- Died: 17 December 1982 (aged 78); Barcelona, Spain

Sport
- Sport: Tennis

Francisco Sindreu Pons (9 March 1904 – 17 December 1982) was a Spanish tennis player. He competed in the men's singles event at the 1924 Summer Olympics.
