= Royal Spanish Tennis Federation =

Real Federación Española de Tenis
- Sport: Tennis
- Abbreviation: RFET
- Founded: 1909
- Affiliation: International Tennis Federation (ITF)
- Regional affiliation: Europe (TE)
- Headquarters: Barcelona
- President: Miguel Díaz Román

Official website
- rfet.es
- (Spain)

The Royal Spanish Tennis Federation, officially known as Real Federación Española de Tenis (RFET) in Spanish is the national governing body of tennis in Spain. Established in 1907, the federation oversees the development, regulation, and promotion of tennis at both the amateur and professional levels throughout the country. The Royal Spanish Tennis Federation is a member of the regional association Tennis Europe and is recognized by the International Tennis Federation (ITF) and the Spanish government as the authoritative body for tennis in Spain. The organization is also responsible for the Spanish Davis Cup team and the Spanish Fed Cup team. The federation headquarters lies in Barcelona.

== History ==
The foundation of the Royal Spanish Tennis Federation can be traced back to the inception of the "Royal Association of Spanish Lawn-Tennis," which originated from the roots of the "Barcelona Lawn-tennis Association." This association held a distinguished position as the foremost national body affiliated with the London tennis association, a governing body that had significant influence over global tennis during the early 1900s. During that era, Spanish clubs lacked a centralized national authority to govern the sport’s regulations. It wasn't until the Concurso Internacional de San Sebastián in September 1909, a gathering that convened representatives from various clubs and enterprises, that the decision was made to establish a national federation. After undergoing numerous changes in nomenclature over the years, the federation adopted its current title, the Real Federación Española de Tenis (RFET), in 1975, solidifying its status as the principal governing body overseeing tennis in Spain.

== Structure ==
The governance structure of the RFET comprises a president elected by member clubs and associations, along with a board of directors overseeing different committees dedicated to areas such as competitions, player development, officiation, and grassroots programs.

=== Presidents ===
Name	Presidency
Jorge de Satrústegui Barrie	1909-1923
José Vidal Ribas y Güell	1924-1928
José María Sagnier Sanjuanena	1929-1931
Francisco Rodón Casas	1932-1935
Juan Andreu Miralles	1936
José Luis de Prat y de Lezcano	1936
José Garriga-Nogués y Garriga-Nogués (Marquis of Cabanes)	1938-1970
Pablo Llorens Reñaga	1970-1984
Salvador Vidal Nunell	1984-1985
Agustín Pujol Niubó	1985-2004
Pedro Muñoz Asenjo	2005-2009
José Luis Escañuela Romana	2009-2015
Fernando Fernández-Ladreda Aguirre	2015-2016
Miguel Díaz Román	2016–Present

== Role and responsibilities ==
The Royal Spanish Tennis Federation functions with the core objective of promoting, organizing, and overseeing tennis within Spain. Its role extends to representing the nation in international tennis competitions and holding memberships in both the European Tennis Association and the Spanish Olympic Committee. The numerous responsibilities the RFET is entrusted with include:

- Organization of Tournaments: The federation organizes and sanctions various national tennis tournaments across different age groups and skill levels, including professional events like the ATP and WTA tournaments held in Spain.
- Player Development: It is actively involved in nurturing and developing tennis talent in Spain through training programs, coaching certifications, and support for young players at regional and national levels.
- Regulation and Officiation: The RFET establishes and enforces the rules and regulations of tennis in Spain, ensuring fair play and maintaining the integrity of the sport. It also trains and certifies officials and referees.
- Promotion and Growth: The federation works to promote the sport of tennis nationwide, encouraging participation at all levels and supporting clubs and facilities to foster growth and accessibility.
- International Representation: It represents Spanish tennis interests internationally by being responsible for the Spanish Davis Cup team and the Spanish Fed Cup team and collaborating with the International Tennis Federation and other tennis federations worldwide.
- Pickleball: The RFET recently reached an agreement with the Spanish Pickleball Association to incorporate Pickleball sport into its framework. This collaboration entails the establishment of a committee within the RFET specifically dedicated to overseeing and managing the sport.

== Notable players ==
In the last 30 years, the RFET has supported many players, aiding in the production of at least one World Number 1 (ATP ranking) every five years: Arancha Sánchez Vicario (1995), Carlos Moyá (1999), Juan Carlos Ferrero (2003), Rafael Nadal (2008, 2010, 2013, 2017 & 2019), Garbiñe Muguruza (2017) and the youngest in tennis history, Carlos Alcaraz (2022) at 19 years old.

== Affiliations ==
The Royal Spanish Tennis Federation collaborates with governmental bodies and other sports organizations to promote tennis and secure resources for the development of the sport. It also partners with educational institutions, local communities, and territorial federations to increase grassroots participation. To ensure its ability to function as intended, RFET has many sponsors that include, but are not limited to Orange, Mapfre, Iberdrola, Loterias y Apuestas del Estado, El Corte Inglés, Iberia, Kia, Head, Joma, TennisLife, Lednix and Indiba.
