= Raimundo Morales =

Spanish tennis player (1898–1986)

Personal information
- Full name: Raimundo Morales Veloso
- Nationality: Spanish
- Born: 2 October 1898; Barcelona, Spain
- Died: 4 October 1986 (aged 88); Santo Domingo, Dominican Republic

Sport
- Sport: Tennis

Raimundo Morales Veloso (2 October 1898 – 4 October 1986) was a Spanish tennis player. He competed in the men's singles event at the 1924 Summer Olympics.
