= Antonio Juanico =

Spanish tennis player (1905–1992)

- Full name: Antonio Juanico Torres
- Country (sports): Spain
- Born: 13 May 1905
- Died: 3 August 1992 (aged 87); Barcelona, Spain

Antonio Juanico Torres (13 May 1905 – 3 August 1992) was a Spanish tennis player. He competed in the Davis Cup from 1926 to 1932.

His older brothers Claudio (1889–1921) and Víctor (1900–1962) were footballers, and both played for RCD Español, among other teams.
