= Spain Davis Cup team =

Davis Cup team representing Spain

Spain
- Association: RFET
- Captain: David Ferrer
- Nations Ranking: 2 (21 September 2026)
- Highest ranking: 1 (27 September 2004)
- Colors: Red & Yellow
- First year: 1921
- Years played: 90
- Ties played (W–L): 231 (147–84)
- Years in World Group: 39 (58–34)
- Davis Cup titles: 6 (2000, 2004, 2008, 2009, 2011, 2019)
- Runners-up: 5 (1965, 1967, 2003, 2012, 2025)
- Most total wins: Manuel Santana (92–28)
- Most singles wins: Manuel Santana (69–17)
- Most doubles wins: Manuel Santana (23–11)
- Best doubles team: José Luis Arilla / Manuel Santana (15–7)
- Most ties played: Manuel Santana (46)
- Most years played: Feliciano López (15)

The Spain men's national tennis team has represented Spain internationally since 1920. Organised by the Real Federación Española de Tenis (RFET), it is one of the 50 members of International Tennis Federation's European association (Tennis Europe).

Spain has won the Davis Cup six times (2000, 2004, 2008, 2009, 2011, 2019), and finished as runner-up five times (1965, 1967, 2003, 2012, 2025), which makes it historically one of the most powerful countries in the tennis world.

Spain has competed in the World Group created in 1981, for 32 years. From 1997 to 2014, competed for 18 consecutive years, returning in 2017, after winning the World Group playoffs the previous year.

== History ==
Spain competed in its first Davis Cup in 1921 but didn't reach the final round until 1965, when the team led by Jaime Bartrolí lost to Australia. They reached the final again two years later but though they had great players such as Manuel Santana and Manuel Orantes, Spain lost against Roy Emerson and company again.

Spanish fans had to wait 33 years in 2000, to see their team play another Davis Cup final, but this time the Spanish team defeated the Australians in Barcelona with Juan Carlos Ferrero as national hero. But Lleyton Hewitt, who had been defeated by Ferrero three years before, had his revenge very soon, when Spain lost to Australia again in 2003.

The following year, Spain reached the final once again. It was played in Seville and for the first time ever, they didn't have to play against Australia. Their opponents were the United States, and thanks to great performances from Carlos Moyá and an 18-year-old Rafael Nadal, Spain won their second Davis Cup.

Spain reached the final once again in 2008, and they won against Argentina. It was the first time that the Spanish team won the final on foreign soil. Unexpectedly, the Spanish heroes were Fernando Verdasco and Feliciano López, winning one single each and the doubles partnering together. David Ferrer, then World Number 5, lost in straight sets to David Nalbandian in the only match he played in the final; and Nadal, World Number 1, was injured, and he wasn't able to play in Argentina.

After winning the Davis Cup for the third time, Emilio Sánchez stepped down as captain to allow compatriot Albert Costa take his place. In 2009, second-seeded Spain cruised to their seventh Davis Cup final after home victories against Serbia, Germany and Israel, even though Costa struggled to make a team as Rafael Nadal and Fernando Verdasco missed two ties each. Spain played the Czech Republic, which previously eliminated first-seeded Argentina. The final was held in home ground again, where they hadn't lost a tie since 1999. Spain swept the Czechs 5–0 at Palau Sant Jordi in Barcelona, behind great performances from David Ferrer and Rafael Nadal to claim their second consecutive title, and the fourth in ten years.

Spain defeated Argentina in the 2011 final, held for the second time in Seville, by a score of 3–1 to claim their fifth title, and the third in four years.

In 2019, Spain won their sixth title (their first since 2011), defeating Canada in the final 2–0. Rafael Nadal was awarded the Davis Cup Most Valuable Player (MVP) trophy, after he won 8 of the 8 matches he participated in.

== Results and fixtures ==
The following are lists of match results and scheduled matches for the current year.

Win Loss Fixture

=== 2025 ===
2025 Davis Cup Qualifiers first round

Switzerland
1
Swiss Tennis Arena, Biel, Switzerland
1–2 February 2025
Hard (i)

Spain
3

			1	2	3
1	(Switzerland) (Spain)	Dominic Stricker; Pedro Martínez	4; 6	6^{7} 7^{9}
2	(Switzerland) (Spain)	Jérôme Kym; Roberto Carballés Baena	4; 6	4; 6
3	(Switzerland) (Spain)	Marc-Andrea Hüsler / Dominic Stricker; Pedro Martínez / Jaume Munar	4; 6	5; 7
4	(Switzerland) (Spain)	Rémy Bertola; Martín Landaluce	6^{2} 7^{7}	6; 3	16; 14
5	(Switzerland) (Spain)	Dominic Stricker; Roberto Carballés Baena				not played

2025 Davis Cup Qualifiers second round

Spain
3
Club de Tenis Puente Romano, Marbella, Spain
13–14 September 2025
Clay

Denmark
2

			1	2	3
1	(Spain) (Denmark)	Pablo Carreño Busta; Holger Rune	5; 7	3; 6
2	(Spain) (Denmark)	Jaume Munar; Elmer Møller	6; 2	1; 6	4; 6
3	(Spain) (Denmark)	Pedro Martínez / Jaume Munar; August Holmgren / Johannes Ingildsen	1; 6	6; 3	6; 2
4	(Spain) (Denmark)	Pedro Martínez; Holger Rune	6; 1	4; 6	7^{7} 6^{3}
5	(Spain) (Denmark)	Pablo Carreño Busta; Elmer Møller	6; 2	6; 3

2025 Davis Cup Final 8

Spain
2
SuperTennis Arena, Bologna, Italy
20 November 2025
Hard (i)

Czech Republic
1

			1	2	3
1	(Spain) (Czech Republic)	Pablo Carreño Busta; Jakub Menšík	5; 7	4; 6
2	(Spain) (Czech Republic)	Jaume Munar; Jiří Lehečka	6; 3	6; 4
3	(Spain) (Czech Republic)	Marcel Granollers / Pedro Martínez; Tomáš Macháč / Jakub Menšík	7^{10} 6^{8}	7^{10} 6^{8}

2025 Davis Cup Finals, Semifinals

Spain
2
SuperTennis Arena, Bologna, Italy
22 November 2025
Hard (i)

Germany
1

			1	2	3
1	(Spain) (Germany)	Pablo Carreño Busta; Jan-Lennard Struff	6; 4	7^{8} 6^{6}
2	(Spain) (Germany)	Jaume Munar; Alexander Zverev	6^{2} 7^{7}	6^{5} 7^{7}
3	(Spain) (Germany)	Marcel Granollers / Pedro Martínez; Kevin Krawietz / Tim Pütz	6; 2	3; 6	6; 3

2025 Davis Cup Finals, Final

Italy
2
SuperTennis Arena, Bologna, Italy
23 November 2025
Hard (i)

Spain
0

			1	2	3
1	(Italy) (Spain)	Matteo Berrettini; Pablo Carreño Busta	6; 3	6; 4
2	(Italy) (Spain)	Flavio Cobolli; Jaume Munar	1; 6	7^{7} 6^{5}	7; 5
3	(Italy) (Spain)	Simone Bolelli / Andrea Vavassori; Marcel Granollers / Pedro Martínez				not played

=== 2026 ===
2026 Davis Cup Qualifiers second round

Chile
0
Estadio Nacional, Santiago, Chile
19–20 September
Clay

Spain
4

			1	2	3
1	(Chile) (Spain)	Alejandro Tabilo; Daniel Mérida	7; 5	3; 6	3; 6
2	(Chile) (Spain)	Cristian Garín; Rafael Jódar	0; 6	2; 6
3	(Chile) (Spain)	Tomás Barrios Vera / Alejandro Tabilo; Pedro Martínez / Jaume Munar	0; 6	3; 6
4	(Chile) (Spain)	Matías Soto; Martín Landaluce	2; 6	3; 6
5	(Chile) (Spain)	Cristian Garín; Daniel Mérida				not played

2026 Davis Cup Finals, Quarterfinals

Austria

SuperTennis Arena, Bologna, Italy
26 November
Hard (i)

Spain

		1	2	3
1	(Austria) (Spain)
2	(Austria) (Spain)
3	(Austria) (Spain)

== Players ==
=== Current team (2026) ===
- Carlos Alcaraz (singles)
- Rafael Jódar (singles)
- Alejandro Davidovich (singles)
- Pedro Martínez (singles)
- Marcel Granollers (doubles)

== Davis Cup wins ==
Edition	Rounds/Opponents	Results
2000	1R: Italy QF: Russia SF: United States F: Australia	1R: 4–1 QF: 4–1 SF: 5–0 F: 3–1
2004	1R: Czech Republic QF: Netherlands SF: France F: United States	1R: 3–2 QF: 4–1 SF: 4–1 F: 3–2
2008	1R: Peru QF: Germany SF: United States F: Argentina	1R: 5–0 QF: 4–1 SF: 4–1 F: 3–1
2009	1R: Serbia QF: Germany SF: Israel F: Czech Republic	1R: 4–1 QF: 3–2 SF: 4–1 F: 5–0
2011	1R: Belgium QF: United States SF: France F: Argentina	1R: 4–1 QF: 3–1 SF: 4–1 F: 3–1
2019	GS: Russia, Croatia QF: Argentina SF: Great Britain F: Canada	GS: 2–1, 3–0 QF: 2–1 SF: 2–1 F: 2–0

== Historical results ==
=== 2000s ===
Year	Competition	Date	Location	Opponent	Score	Result
2000	World Group, 1st Round	4–6 February	Murcia, Spain	Italy	4–1	Won
2000	World Group, Quarterfinals	7–9 April	Málaga, Spain	Russia	4–1	Won
2000	World Group, Semifinals	21–23 July	Santander, Spain	United States	5–0	Won
2000	World Group, Final	8–10 December	Barcelona, Spain	Australia	3–1	Champion
2001	World Group, 1st Round	9–11 February	Eindhoven, Netherlands	Netherlands	1–4	Lost
2001	World Group, qualifying round	21–23 September	Albacete, Spain	Uzbekistan	4–0	Won
2002	World Group, 1st Round	8–10 February	Zaragoza, Spain	Morocco	3–2	Won
2002	World Group, Quarterfinals	5–7 April	Houston, United States	United States	1–3	Lost
2003	World Group, 1st Round	7–9 February	Seville, Spain	Belgium	5–0	Won
2003	World Group, Quarterfinals	4–6 April	Valencia, Spain	Croatia	5–0	Won
2003	World Group, Semifinals	19–21 September	Málaga, Spain	Argentina	3–2	Won
2003	World Group, Final	28–30 November	Melbourne, Australia	Australia	1–3	Runner-up
2004	World Group, 1st Round	6–8 February	Brno, Czech Republic	Czech Republic	3–2	Won
2004	World Group, Quarterfinals	9–11 April	Palma de Mallorca, Spain	Netherlands	4–1	Won
2004	World Group, Semifinals	24–26 September	Alicante, Spain	France	4–1	Won
2004	World Group, Final	3–5 December	Seville, Spain	United States	3–2	Champion
2005	World Group, 1st Round	4–6 March	Bratislava, Slovakia	Slovakia	1–4	Lost
2005	World Group, Relegation playoff	23–25 September	Torre del Greco, Italy	Italy	3–2	Won
2006	World Group, 1st Round	10–12 February	Minsk, Belarus	Belarus	1–4	Lost
2006	World Group, Relegation playoff	22–24 September	Santander, Spain	Italy	4–1	Won
2007	World Group, 1st Round	9–11 February	Geneva, Switzerland	Switzerland	3–2	Won
2007	World Group, Quarterfinals	6–8 April	Winston-Salem, United States	United States	1–4	Lost
2008	World Group, 1st Round	8–10 February	Lima, Peru	Peru	5–0	Won
2008	World Group, Quarterfinals	11–13 April	Bremen, Germany	Germany	4–1	Won
2008	World Group, Semifinals	19–21 September	Madrid, Spain	United States	4–1	Won
2008	World Group, Final	21–23 November	Mar del Plata, Argentina	Argentina	1–3	Champion
2009	World Group, 1st Round	6–8 March	Benidorm, Spain	Serbia	4–1	Won
2009	World Group, Quarterfinals	10–12 July	Marbella, Spain	Germany	3–2	Won
2009	World Group, Semifinals	18–20 September	Murcia, Spain	Israel	4–1	Won
2009	World Group, Final	4–6 December	Barcelona, Spain	Czech Republic	5–0	Champion

=== 2010s ===
Year	Competition	Date	Location	Opponent	Score	Result
2010	World Group, 1st Round	5–7 March	Logroño, Spain	Switzerland	4–1	Won
2010	World Group, Quarterfinals	9–11 July	Clermont-Ferrand, France	France	0–5	Loss
2011	World Group, 1st Round	4–6 March	Charleroi, Belgium	Belgium	4–1	Won
2011	World Group, Quarterfinals	8–10 July	Austin, United States	United States	3–1	Won
2011	World Group, Semifinals	16–18 September	Córdoba, Spain	France	4–1	Won
2011	World Group, Final	2–4 December	Seville, Spain	Argentina	3–1	Champion
2012	World Group, 1st Round	10–12 February	Oviedo, Spain	Kazakhstan	5–0	Won
2012	World Group, Quarterfinals	6–8 April	Oropesa del Mar, Spain	Austria	4–1	Won
2012	World Group, Semifinals	14–16 September	Gijón, Spain	United States	3–1	Won
2012	World Group, Final	16–18 November	Prague, Czech Republic	Czech Republic	2–3	Runner-up
2013	World Group, 1st Round	1–3 February	Vancouver, Canada	Canada	2–3	Loss
2013	World Group, Relegation playoff	13–15 September	Madrid, Spain	Ukraine	5–0	Won
2014	World Group, 1st Round	31 January – 2 February	Frankfurt, Germany	Germany	1–4	Loss
2014	World Group, Relegation playoff	12–14 September	São Paulo, Brazil	Brazil	1–3	Loss
2015	Europe/Africa Zone Group I, 2nd Round	17–19 July	Vladivostok, Russia	Russia	2–3	Loss
2015	Europe/Africa Zone Group I, First round play-offs	18–20 September	Odense, Denmark	Denmark	5–0	Won
2016	Europe/Africa Zone Group I, 2nd Round	15–17 July	Cluj-Napoca, Romania	Romania	4–1	Won
2016	World Group play-offs	16–18 September	New Delhi, India	India	5–0	Won
2017	World Group, 1st Round	3–5 February	Osijek, Croatia	Croatia	3–2	Won
2017	World Group, Quarterfinals	7–9 April	Belgrade, Serbia	Serbia	1–4	Loss
2018	World Group, 1st Round	2–4 February	Marbella, Spain	(United Kingdom) Great Britain	3–1	Won
2018	World Group, Quarterfinals	6–8 April	Valencia, Spain	Germany	3–2	Won
2018	World Group, Semifinals	14–16 September	Nanterre, France	France	2–3	Loss
2019	Finals, Group stage	19 November	Madrid, Spain	Russia	2–1	Won
2019	Finals, Group stage	20 November	Madrid, Spain	Croatia	3–0	Won
2019	Finals, Quarterfinals	22 November	Madrid, Spain	Argentina	2–1	Won
2019	Finals, Semifinals	23 November	Madrid, Spain	Great Britain	2–1	Won
2019	Finals, Final	24 November	Madrid, Spain	Canada	2–0	Champion

=== 2020s ===
Year	Competition	Date	Location	Opponent	Score	Result
2020-2021	Finals, Group stage	26 November	Madrid, Spain	Ecuador	3–0	Won
2020-2021	Finals, Group stage	28 November	Madrid, Spain	RTF	1–2	Loss
2022	Finals, Qualifying round	4–5 March	Marbella, Spain	Romania	3–1	Won
2022	Finals, Group stage	14 September	Valencia, Spain	Serbia	3–0	Won
2022	Finals, Group stage	16 September	Valencia, Spain	Canada	1–2	Loss
2022	Finals, Group stage	18 September	Valencia, Spain	South Korea	3–0	Won
2022	Finals, Quarterfinals	23 November	Málaga, Spain	Croatia	0–2	Loss
2023	Finals, Group stage	13 September	Valencia, Spain	Czech Republic	0–3	Loss
2023	Finals, Group stage	15 September	Valencia, Spain	Serbia	0–3	Loss
2023	Finals, Group stage	17 September	Valencia, Spain	South Korea	2–1	Won
2024	Finals, Group stage	11 September	Valencia, Spain	Czech Republic	3–0	Won
2024	Finals, Group stage	13 September	Valencia, Spain	France	2–1	Won
2024	Finals, Group stage	15 September	Valencia, Spain	Australia	2–1	Won
2024	Finals, Quarterfinals	19 November	Málaga, Spain	Netherlands	1–2	Loss
2025	Qualifiers, First round	1–2 February	Biel-Bienne, Switzerland	Switzerland	3–1	Won
2025	Qualifiers, Second round	13–14 September	Marbella, Spain	Denmark	3–2	Won
2025	Finals, Quarterfinals	20 November	Bologna, Italy	Czech Republic	2–1	Won
2025	Finals, Semifinals	22 November	Bologna, Italy	Germany	2–1	Won
2025	Finals, Final	23 November	Bologna, Italy	Italy	0–2	Loss
2026	Qualifiers, Second round	19–20 September	Santiago, Chile	Chile	4–0	Won
2026	Finals, Quarterfinals	26 November	Bologna, Italy	Austria	–	

== See also ==
- Davis Cup
- Spain Billie Jean King Cup team
- Spain at the Hopman Cup
- Royal Spanish Tennis Federation
