= Australia Davis Cup team results (1980–2009) =

This is a list of the Australia Davis Cup team results from 1980 to 2009. It does not include ties that were not completed, for example when a walkover occurred. In total they played 87 ties.

In this period, Australia won the Davis Cup title on four occasions (1983, 1986, 1999 and 2003), were finalists on four occasions (1990, 1993, 2000 and 2001), and were semifinalists on eight occasions (1980, 1981, 1982, 1984, 1985, 1987, 1997 and 2006). They also reached the quarterfinals on four occasions (1988, 1991, 1992, 2005).

With the introduction of the World Group, Australia survived the relegation play off five times and were relegated to Asia/Oceania Zone on two occasions (1995 and 2007). In total, Australia competed in 26 out of the 29 years in the World Group.

== 1980s ==
=== 1980 ===
Eastern Zone
Semifinals

Australia
5
Domain Centre, Hobart, Australia
8–10 February 1980
Carpet

Japan
0

			1	2	3	4	5
1	(Australia) (Japan)	Mark Edmondson; Tsuyoshi Fukui	6; 2	6; 3	4; 6	6; 3
2	(Australia) (Japan)	Peter McNamara; Shigeyuki Nishio	6; 4	6; 3	6; 0
3	(Australia) (Japan)	Brad Drewett / Mark Edmondson; Jun Kamiwazumi / Shinichi Sakamoto	8; 6	6; 1	6; 2
4	(Australia) (Japan)	Peter McNamara; Tsuyoshi Fukui	7; 5	6; 0	6; 3
5	(Australia) (Japan)	Mark Edmondson; Shigeyuki Nishio	2; 6	6; 0	6; 2	6; 1

Eastern Zone
Final

Australia
3
Milton Courts, Brisbane, Australia
7–9 March 1980
Grass

New Zealand
1

			1	2	3	4	5
1	(Australia) (New Zealand)	John Alexander; Chris Lewis	7; 5	7; 9	10; 8	4; 6	5; 7
2	(Australia) (New Zealand)	Phil Dent; Onny Parun	6; 2	5; 7	6; 3	3; 6	6; 2
3	(Australia) (New Zealand)	John Alexander / Phil Dent; Chris Lewis / Russell Simpson	6; 2	8; 6	9; 7
4	(Australia) (New Zealand)	Phil Dent; Chris Lewis	6; 4	6; 3	6; 2
5	(Australia) (New Zealand)	John Alexander; Onny Parun						not played

Semifinals

Italy
3
Foro Italico, Rome, Italy
19–21 September 1980
Clay

Australia
2

			1	2	3	4	5
1	(Italy) (Australia)	Adriano Panatta; Paul McNamee	5; 7	6; 4	6; 0	6; 4
2	(Italy) (Australia)	Corrado Barazzutti; Peter McNamara	8; 10	6; 1	4; 6	2; 6
3	(Italy) (Australia)	Paolo Bertolucci / Adriano Panatta; Peter McNamara / Paul McNamee	2; 6	9; 7	9; 7	2; 6	6; 4
4	(Italy) (Australia)	Adriano Panatta; Peter McNamara	6; 1	7; 5	6; 4
5	(Italy) (Australia)	Corrado Barazzutti; Rod Frawley	6; 2	4; 6	6; 8

=== 1981 ===
World Group First round

France
2
Palais des Sports, Lyon, France
6–8 March 1981
Carpet (indoors)

Australia
3

			1	2	3	4	5
1	(France) (Australia)	Yannick Noah; Peter McNamara	6; 4	6; 8	3; 6	6; 3	3; 6
2	(France) (Australia)	Pascal Portes; Kim Warwick	4; 6	6; 2	9; 7	6; 4
3	(France) (Australia)	Yannick Noah / Pascal Portes; Mark Edmondson / Kim Warwick	3; 6	2; 6	7; 5	4; 6
4	(France) (Australia)	Pascal Portes; Peter McNamara	3; 6	0; 6	2; 6
5	(France) (Australia)	Yannick Noah; Kim Warwick	6; 2	7; 5	10; 8

World Group Quarterfinals

Sweden
1
Båstad Tennis Stadium, Båstad, Sweden
10–12 July 1981
Clay

Australia
3

			1	2	3	4	5
1	(Sweden) (Australia)	Per Hjertquist; Paul McNamee	3; 6	6; 8	1; 6
2	(Sweden) (Australia)	Mats Wilander; Peter McNamara	4; 6	2; 6	1; 6
3	(Sweden) (Australia)	Anders Järryd / Hans Simonsson; Peter McNamara / Paul McNamee	7; 9	3; 6	8; 6	6; 2	6; 2
4	(Sweden) (Australia)	Mats Wilander; Paul McNamee	6; 1	6; 2	4; 6	0; 6	4; 6
5	(Sweden) (Australia)	Per Hjertquist; Peter McNamara	6; 6					not completed

World Group Semifinals

United States
5
Memorial Coliseum, Portland, OR, United States
2–4 October 1981
Carpet (indoors)

Australia
0

			1	2	3	4	5
1	(United States) (Australia)	John McEnroe; Mark Edmondson	6; 3	6; 4	6; 2
2	(United States) (Australia)	Roscoe Tanner; Peter McNamara	6; 4	6; 4	4; 6	3; 6	6; 3
3	(United States) (Australia)	Peter Fleming / John McEnroe; Phil Dent / Peter McNamara	8; 6	6; 4	8; 6
4	(United States) (Australia)	John McEnroe; Peter McNamara	9; 7	6; 0
5	(United States) (Australia)	Roscoe Tanner; Mark Edmondson	4; 6	6; 2	6; 3

=== 1982 ===
World Group First round

Mexico
2
Estadio Rafael Osuna, Mexico City, Mexico
5–7 March 1982
Carpet (indoors)

Australia
3

			1	2	3	4	5
1	(Mexico) (Australia)	Francisco Maciel; Mark Edmondson	3; 6	4; 6	1; 6
2	(Mexico) (Australia)	Raúl Ramírez; Peter McNamara	6; 2	6; 3	6; 4
3	(Mexico) (Australia)	Jorge Lozano / Raúl Ramírez; John Alexander / Phil Dent	3; 6	7; 5	7; 5	9; 7
4	(Mexico) (Australia)	Francisco Maciel; Peter McNamara	3; 6	3; 6	0; 6
5	(Mexico) (Australia)	Raúl Ramírez; Mark Edmondson	1; 6	4; 6	2; 6

World Group Quarterfinals

Australia
4
Milton Courts, Brisbane, Australia
9–11 July 1982
Grass

Chile
1

			1	2	3	4	5
1	(Australia) (Chile)	John Fitzgerald; Ricardo Acuña	8; 6	7; 5	6; 1
2	(Australia) (Chile)	Mark Edmondson; Pedro Rebolledo	6; 1	6; 2	6; 3
3	(Australia) (Chile)	Peter McNamara / Paul McNamee; Hans Gildemeister / Belus Prajoux	8; 6	2; 6	8; 6	6; 2
4	(Australia) (Chile)	Mark Edmondson; Ricardo Acuña	4; 6	6; 2	4; 6	4; 6
5	(Australia) (Chile)	John Fitzgerald; Pedro Rebolledo	8; 6	3; 6	4; 6	6; 4	6; 2

World Group Semifinals

Australia
0
Perth Entertainment Centre, Perth, Australia
1–3 October 1982
Carpet (indoors)

United States
5

			1	2	3	4	5
1	(Australia) (United States)	Peter McNamara; John McEnroe	4; 6	6; 4	2; 6	4; 6
2	(Australia) (United States)	John Alexander; Gene Mayer	4; 6	6; 3	1; 6	2; 6
3	(Australia) (United States)	Peter McNamara / Paul McNamee; Peter Fleming / John McEnroe	2; 6	2; 6	6; 3	6; 8
4	(Australia) (United States)	Mark Edmondson; Gene Mayer	3; 6	3; 6
5	(Australia) (United States)	John Alexander; John McEnroe	4; 6	3; 6

=== 1983 ===
World Group First round

Australia
4
Memorial Drive, Adelaide, Australia
4–6 March 1983
Grass

Great Britain
1

			1	2	3	4	5
1	(Australia) (United Kingdom)	Pat Cash; John Lloyd	5; 7	7; 5	6; 3	1; 6	7; 5
2	(Australia) (United Kingdom)	Paul McNamee; Buster Mottram	6; 3	6; 2	6; 2
3	(Australia) (United Kingdom)	Mark Edmondson / Paul McNamee; Andrew Jarrett / John Lloyd	6; 2	9; 11	6; 3	6; 2
4	(Australia) (United Kingdom)	Pat Cash; Buster Mottram	6; 1	5; 7	3; 6
5	(Australia) (United Kingdom)	Paul McNamee; John Lloyd	6; 1	6; 2

World Group Quarterfinals

Australia
5
Milton Courts, Brisbane, Australia
8–10 July 1983
Grass

Romania
0

			1	2	3	4	5
1	(Australia) (Romania)	Pat Cash; Florin Segărceanu	6; 2	6; 1	6; 1
2	(Australia) (Romania)	Mark Edmondson; Ilie Năstase	4; 6	6; 3	14; 12	6; 2
3	(Australia) (Romania)	Mark Edmondson / Paul McNamee; Ilie Năstase / Florin Segărceanu	8; 6	7; 5	6; 0
4	(Australia) (Romania)	Pat Cash; Ilie Năstase	6; 3	6; 3
5	(Australia) (Romania)	Mark Edmondson; Florin Segărceanu	6; 4	6; 3

World Group Semifinals

Australia
4
White City Stadium, Sydney, Australia
30 September–2 October 1983
Grass

France
1

			1	2	3	4	5
1	(Australia) (France)	Pat Cash; Yannick Noah	4; 6	8; 10	3; 6
2	(Australia) (France)	John Fitzgerald; Henri Leconte	4; 6	10; 8	9; 7	6; 2
3	(Australia) (France)	Mark Edmondson / Paul McNamee; Henri Leconte / Yannick Noah	11; 9	6; 4	6; 3
4	(Australia) (France)	John Fitzgerald; Yannick Noah	13; 11	4; 6	6; 4	6; 3
5	(Australia) (France)	Pat Cash; Henri Leconte	3; 6	9; 7	8; 6

World Group Final

Australia
3
Kooyong Stadium, Melbourne, Australia
26–28 December 1983
Grass

Sweden
2

			1	2	3	4	5
1	(Australia) (Sweden)	Pat Cash; Mats Wilander	3; 6	6; 4	7; 9	3; 6
2	(Australia) (Sweden)	John Fitzgerald; Joakim Nyström	6; 4	6; 2	4; 6	6; 4
3	(Australia) (Sweden)	Mark Edmondson / Paul McNamee; Anders Järryd / Hans Simonsson	6; 4	6; 4	6; 2
4	(Australia) (Sweden)	Pat Cash; Joakim Nyström	6; 4	6; 1	6; 1
5	(Australia) (Sweden)	John Fitzgerald; Mats Wilander	8; 6	1; 6	0; 6

=== 1984 ===
World Group First round

Australia
5
Royal King's Park Tennis Club, Perth, Australia
24–26 February 1984
Grass

Yugoslavia
0

			1	2	3	4	5
1	(Australia) (Socialist Federal Republic of Yugoslavia)	Paul McNamee; Slobodan Živojinović	9; 7	4; 6	9; 7	10; 8
2	(Australia) (Socialist Federal Republic of Yugoslavia)	John Fitzgerald; Marko Ostoja	2; 6	7; 5	6; 1	6; 2
3	(Australia) (Socialist Federal Republic of Yugoslavia)	Mark Edmondson / Paul McNamee; Marko Ostoja / Slobodan Živojinović	6; 4	6; 1	6; 4
4	(Australia) (Socialist Federal Republic of Yugoslavia)	John Fitzgerald; Bruno Orešar	6; 3	6; 4
5	(Australia) (Socialist Federal Republic of Yugoslavia)	Paul McNamee; Branko Horvat	6; 4	10; 8

World Group Quarterfinals

Australia
5
Milton Courts, Brisbane, Australia
13–15 July 1984
Grass

Italy
0

			1	2	3	4	5
1	(Australia) (Italy)	John Fitzgerald; Gianni Ocleppo	6; 3	6; 1	4; 6	6; 1
2	(Australia) (Italy)	Pat Cash; Claudio Panatta	6; 3	3; 6	6; 3	6; 4
3	(Australia) (Italy)	Mark Edmondson / Paul McNamee; Gianni Ocleppo / Claudio Panatta	3; 6	7; 5	6; 4	6; 3
4	(Australia) (Italy)	John Fitzgerald; Claudio Panatta	6; 4	8; 10	6; 2
5	(Australia) (Italy)	Pat Cash; Gianni Ocleppo	9; 7	6; 4

World Group Semifinals

United States
4
Memorial Coliseum, Portland, OR, United States
28–30 September 1984
Carpet (indoors)

Australia
1

			1	2	3	4	5
1	(United States) (Australia)	John McEnroe; Pat Cash	6; 3	6; 4	6; 1
2	(United States) (Australia)	Jimmy Connors; John Fitzgerald	6; 3	6; 3	6; 2
3	(United States) (Australia)	Peter Fleming / John McEnroe; Mark Edmondson / Paul McNamee	6; 4	6; 2	6; 3
4	(United States) (Australia)	John McEnroe; John Fitzgerald	4; 6	6; 2	6; 1
5	(United States) (Australia)	Jimmy Connors; Pat Cash	4; 6	2; 6

=== 1985 ===
World Group First round

Yugoslavia
2
Split, Yugoslavia
8–10 March 1985
Clay (indoors)

Australia
3

			1	2	3	4	5
1	(Socialist Federal Republic of Yugoslavia) (Australia)	Marko Ostoja; Paul McNamee	6; 3	6; 3	8; 10	0; 6	4; 6
2	(Socialist Federal Republic of Yugoslavia) (Australia)	Slobodan Živojinović; Pat Cash	7; 5	5; 7	10; 8	6; 4
3	(Socialist Federal Republic of Yugoslavia) (Australia)	Goran Prpić / Slobodan Živojinović; Pat Cash / John Fitzgerald	5; 7	12; 10	8; 6	4; 6	4; 6
4	(Socialist Federal Republic of Yugoslavia) (Australia)	Marko Ostoja; Pat Cash	2; 6	0; 6	2; 6
5	(Socialist Federal Republic of Yugoslavia) (Australia)	Slobodan Živojinović; Paul McNamee	3; 6	6; 3	6; 3

World Group Quarterfinals

Australia
3
White City Stadium, Sydney, Australia
2–4 August 1985
Grass

Paraguay
2

			1	2	3	4	5
1	(Australia) (Paraguay)	Paul McNamee; Francisco González	3; 6	6; 0	6; 3	6; 1
2	(Australia) (Paraguay)	John Fitzgerald; Víctor Pecci	2; 6	3; 6	6; 1	4; 6
3	(Australia) (Paraguay)	Mark Edmondson / Paul McNamee; Francisco González / Víctor Pecci	3; 6	10; 8	3; 6	6; 1	3; 6
4	(Australia) (Paraguay)	Paul McNamee; Víctor Pecci	6; 8	7; 5	6; 2	9; 7
5	(Australia) (Paraguay)	John Fitzgerald; Francisco González	6; 3	9; 7	7; 5

World Group Semifinals

Sweden
5
Baltiska Hallen, Malmö, Sweden
4–6 October 1985
Clay (indoors)

Australia
0

			1	2	3	4	5
1	(Sweden) (Australia)	Anders Järryd; Peter McNamara	6; 4	6; 4	13; 11
2	(Sweden) (Australia)	Mats Wilander; Wally Masur	6; 1	6; 1	6; 0
3	(Sweden) (Australia)	Stefan Edberg / Anders Järryd; Mark Edmondson / John Fitzgerald	6; 4	6; 3	6; 4
4	(Sweden) (Australia)	Mats Wilander; Peter McNamara	6; 4	6; 3
5	(Sweden) (Australia)	Anders Järryd; Wally Masur	6; 1	6; 2

=== 1986 ===
World Group First round

New Zealand
1
Stanley Street, Auckland, New Zealand
7–9 March 1986
Hard

Australia
4

			1	2	3	4	5
1	(New Zealand) (Australia)	Kelly Evernden; Paul McNamee	9; 11	3; 6	6; 4	6; 3	6; 4
2	(New Zealand) (Australia)	Chris Lewis; Peter McNamara	2; 6	5; 7	4; 6
3	(New Zealand) (Australia)	Kelly Evernden / Russell Simpson; Pat Cash / John Fitzgerald	2; 6	3; 6	3; 6
4	(New Zealand) (Australia)	Kelly Evernden; Peter McNamara	6; 3	1; 6	3; 6	1; 6
5	(New Zealand) (Australia)	Chris Lewis; Paul McNamee	4; 6	4; 6

World Group Quarterfinals

Great Britain
1
No. 1 Court, All England Club, Wimbledon, United Kingdom
18–20 July 1986
Grass

Australia
4

			1	2	3	4	5
1	(United Kingdom) (Australia)	Jeremy Bates; Pat Cash	4; 6	7; 9	4; 6
2	(United Kingdom) (Australia)	Andrew Castle; Paul McNamee	5; 7	1; 6	2; 6
3	(United Kingdom) (Australia)	Jeremy Bates / Colin Dowdeswell; Pat Cash / John Fitzgerald	1; 6	5; 7	4; 6
4	(United Kingdom) (Australia)	Andrew Castle; Pat Cash	6; 8	4; 6
5	(United Kingdom) (Australia)	Jeremy Bates; Paul McNamee	3; 6	6; 2	6; 4

World Group Semifinals

Australia
3
Milton Courts, Brisbane, Australia
3–5 October 1986
Grass

United States
1

			1	2	3	4	5
1	(Australia) (United States)	Paul McNamee; Brad Gilbert	2; 6	6; 3	3; 6	6; 0	6; 1
2	(Australia) (United States)	Pat Cash; Tim Mayotte	4; 6	6; 1	6; 2	6; 2
3	(Australia) (United States)	Pat Cash / John Fitzgerald; Paul Annacone / Ken Flach	10; 8	6; 1	5; 7	11; 13	7; 9
4	(Australia) (United States)	Pat Cash; Brad Gilbert	3; 6	6; 2	6; 3	6; 4
5	(Australia) (United States)	Paul McNamee; Tim Mayotte	6; 3	2; 5				not completed

World Group Final

Australia
3
Kooyong Stadium, Melbourne, Australia
26–28 December 1986
Grass

Sweden
2

			1	2	3	4	5
1	(Australia) (Sweden)	Pat Cash; Stefan Edberg	13; 11	13; 11	6; 4
2	(Australia) (Sweden)	Paul McNamee; Mikael Pernfors	3; 6	1; 6	3; 6
3	(Australia) (Sweden)	Pat Cash / John Fitzgerald; Stefan Edberg / Anders Järryd	6; 3	6; 4	4; 6	6; 1
4	(Australia) (Sweden)	Pat Cash; Mikael Pernfors	2; 6	4; 6	6; 3	6; 4	6; 3
5	(Australia) (Sweden)	Paul McNamee; Stefan Edberg	8; 10	4; 6

=== 1987 ===
World Group First round

Australia
4
Memorial Drive Park, Adelaide, Australia
13–15 March 1987
Grass

Yugoslavia
1

			1	2	3	4	5
1	(Australia) (Socialist Federal Republic of Yugoslavia)	Pat Cash; Bruno Orešar	9; 7	6; 4	7; 5
2	(Australia) (Socialist Federal Republic of Yugoslavia)	Wally Masur; Slobodan Živojinović	8; 6	6; 8	7; 9	10; 12
3	(Australia) (Socialist Federal Republic of Yugoslavia)	Pat Cash / Peter Doohan; Igor Flego / Slobodan Živojinović	9; 11	7; 5	6; 3	6; 4
4	(Australia) (Socialist Federal Republic of Yugoslavia)	Wally Masur; Bruno Orešar	8; 6	6; 2	6; 1
5	(Australia) (Socialist Federal Republic of Yugoslavia)	Pat Cash; Slobodan Živojinović	6; 8	7; 5	6; 0

World Group Quarterfinals

Australia
4
Milton Courts, Brisbane, Australia
24–26 July 1987
Grass

Mexico
1

			1	2	3	4	5
1	(Australia) (Mexico)	Wally Masur; Jorge Lozano	6; 3	6; 4	6; 4
2	(Australia) (Mexico)	Pat Cash; Leonardo Lavalle	6; 2	6; 1	6; 0
3	(Australia) (Mexico)	Peter Doohan / Wally Masur; Leonardo Lavalle / Jorge Lozano	3; 6	6; 4	4; 6	8; 6	13; 11
4	(Australia) (Mexico)	Pat Cash; Jorge Lozano	6; 3	6; 4
5	(Australia) (Mexico)	Wally Masur; Leonardo Lavalle	5; 7	4; 6

World Group Semifinals

Australia
2
White City Stadium, Sydney, Australia
2–4 October 1987
Grass

India
3

			1	2	3	4	5
1	(Australia) (India)	John Fitzgerald; Ramesh Krishnan	1; 6	2; 6	6; 3	6; 8
2	(Australia) (India)	Wally Masur; Vijay Amritraj	6; 1	3; 6	10; 12	4; 6
3	(Australia) (India)	Pat Cash / Peter Doohan; Anand Amritraj / Srinivasan Vasudevan	6; 3	6; 4	6; 4
4	(Australia) (India)	John Fitzgerald; Vijay Amritraj	7; 5	6; 3	6; 3
5	(Australia) (India)	Wally Masur; Ramesh Krishnan	6; 8	4; 6	4; 6

=== 1988 ===
World Group First round

Mexico
2
Estadio Federico Boehm, Mexico City, Mexico
5–8 February 1988
Clay

Australia
3

			1	2	3	4	5
1	(Mexico) (Australia)	Leonardo Lavalle; Pat Cash	7; 5	4; 6	1; 6	9; 11
2	(Mexico) (Australia)	Francisco Maciel; Wally Masur	3; 6	8; 6	6; 3	7; 5
3	(Mexico) (Australia)	Leonardo Lavalle / Jorge Lozano; Pat Cash / John Fitzgerald	2; 6	3; 6	2; 6
4	(Mexico) (Australia)	Leonardo Lavalle; Wally Masur	6; 2	6; 1	4; 6	9; 11	6; 2
5	(Mexico) (Australia)	Francisco Maciel; Pat Cash	2; 6	6; 4	5; 7	2; 6

World Group Quarterfinals

France
5
Maison des Sports, Clermont-Ferrand, France
8–10 April 1988
Clay (indoors)

Australia
0

			1	2	3	4	5
1	(France) (Australia)	Yannick Noah; Darren Cahill	3; 6	6; 4	6; 4	6; 2
2	(France) (Australia)	Henri Leconte; Mark Woodforde	6; 3	7; 9	3; 6	7; 5	6; 0
3	(France) (Australia)	Guy Forget / Yannick Noah; John Fitzgerald / Wally Masur	6; 3	7; 5	6; 4
4	(France) (Australia)	Henri Leconte; John Fitzgerald	9; 7	7; 5
5	(France) (Australia)	Yannick Noah; Mark Woodforde	6; 2	6; 4

=== 1989 ===
World Group First round

Austria
5
Ferry-Dusika-Hallenstadion, Vienna, Austria
3–5 February 1989
Clay (indoors)

Australia
0

			1	2	3	4	5
1	(Austria) (Australia)	Horst Skoff; Pat Cash	7^{7} 6^{1}	7; 5	6; 3
2	(Austria) (Australia)	Thomas Muster; Mark Woodforde	6; 4	6^{4} 7^{7}	6; 2	6; 3
3	(Austria) (Australia)	Alex Antonitsch / Thomas Muster; Pat Cash / John Fitzgerald	6; 3	7^{7} 6^{4}	3; 6	3; 6	6; 2
4	(Austria) (Australia)	Horst Skoff; Mark Woodforde	2; 6	6; 4	6; 2
5	(Austria) (Australia)	Thomas Muster; Pat Cash	6; 2	6; 0

World Group Qualifying round

Peru
2
Jockey Club del Perú, Lima, Peru
21–24 July 1989
Clay

Australia
3

			1	2	3	4	5
1	(Peru) (Australia)	Jaime Yzaga; Wally Masur	6; 4	2; 6	6; 4	6; 2
2	(Peru) (Australia)	Pablo Arraya; Darren Cahill	5; 7	1; 6	0; 6
3	(Peru) (Australia)	Carlos di Laura / Jaime Yzaga; Darren Cahill / John Fitzgerald	5; 7	3; 6	6^{3} 7^{7}
4	(Peru) (Australia)	Jaime Yzaga; Jason Stoltenberg	1; 6	6; 2	6; 1	1; 6	9; 7
5	(Peru) (Australia)	Pablo Arraya; Wally Masur	4; 6	4; 6	6; 4	2; 6

== 1990s ==
=== 1990 ===
World Group First round

Australia
3
Royal King's Park Tennis Club, Perth, Australia
2–4 February 1990
Grass

France
2

			1	2	3	4	5
1	(Australia) (France)	Darren Cahill; Henri Leconte	3; 6	5; 7	3; 6
2	(Australia) (France)	Wally Masur; Yannick Noah	4; 6	6; 3	4; 6	6; 3	6; 2
3	(Australia) (France)	Pat Cash / John Fitzgerald; Guy Forget / Yannick Noah	7^{8} 6^{6}	6; 4	6; 4
4	(Australia) (France)	Wally Masur; Henri Leconte	6; 4	3; 6	6; 3	2; 6	6; 4
5	(Australia) (France)	Darren Cahill; Yannick Noah	4; 6	4; 6

World Group Quarterfinals

Australia
3
Milton Courts, Brisbane, Australia
30 March–1 April 1990
Grass

New Zealand
2

			1	2	3	4	5
1	(Australia) (New Zealand)	John Fitzgerald; Brett Steven	6; 1	6; 0	3; 6	4; 6	2; 6
2	(Australia) (New Zealand)	Wally Masur; Kelly Evernden	6; 3	7^{7} 6^{0}	6; 1
3	(Australia) (New Zealand)	Darren Cahill / Mark Kratzmann; Kelly Evernden / David Lewis	7; 5	6; 3	7^{7} 6^{4}
4	(Australia) (New Zealand)	Wally Masur; Brett Steven	7; 5	6; 2	6; 4
5	(Australia) (New Zealand)	John Fitzgerald; Kelly Evernden	5; 7	7^{10} 6^{8}	1; 6

World Group Semifinals

Australia
5
White City Stadium, Sydney, Australia
21–23 September 1990
Grass

Argentina
0

			1	2	3	4	5
1	(Australia) (Argentina)	Pat Cash; Alberto Mancini	6; 1	6; 1	6; 2
2	(Australia) (Argentina)	Wally Masur; Martín Jaite	3; 6	6^{4} 7^{7}	6; 4	6; 0	6; 2
3	(Australia) (Argentina)	Darren Cahill / Mark Kratzmann; Javier Frana / Christian Miniussi	3; 6	7^{7} 6^{5}	7^{8} 6^{6}	4; 6	15; 13
4	(Australia) (Argentina)	Pat Cash; Martín Jaite	7; 5	6; 2
5	(Australia) (Argentina)	Wally Masur; Javier Frana	6; 2	6; 2

World Group Final

United States
3
Florida Suncoast Dome, St. Petersburg, FL, United States
30 November–2 December 1990
Clay (indoors)

Australia
2

			1	2	3	4	5
1	(United States) (Australia)	Andre Agassi; Richard Fromberg	4; 6	6; 2	4; 6	6; 2	6; 4
2	(United States) (Australia)	Michael Chang; Darren Cahill	6; 2	7^{7} 6^{4}	6; 0
3	(United States) (Australia)	Rick Leach / Jim Pugh; Pat Cash / John Fitzgerald	6; 4	6; 2	3; 6	7^{7} 6^{2}
4	(United States) (Australia)	Andre Agassi; Darren Cahill	4; 6	6; 4				retired
5	(United States) (Australia)	Michael Chang; Richard Fromberg	5; 7	6; 2	3; 6

=== 1991 ===
World Group First round

Australia
5
Royal King's Park Tennis Club, Perth, Australia
1–3 February 1991
Grass

Belgium
0

			1	2	3	4	5
1	(Australia) (Belgium)	Richard Fromberg; Filip Dewulf	6; 4	6; 3	1; 6	6; 4
2	(Australia) (Belgium)	Wally Masur; Eduardo Masso	6; 3	6; 3	6; 1
3	(Australia) (Belgium)	Darren Cahill / Todd Woodbridge; Eduardo Masso / Libor Pimek	6; 3	6; 3	6; 3
4	(Australia) (Belgium)	Richard Fromberg; Eduardo Masso	6; 3	1; 6	6; 3
5	(Australia) (Belgium)	Wally Masur; Filip Dewulf	6; 1	6; 2

World Group Quarterfinals

France
3
Arena of Nîmes, Nîmes, France
3–5 May 1991
Clay

Australia
2

			1	2	3	4	5
1	(France) (Australia)	Guy Forget; Wally Masur	6; 3	6; 3	6; 4
2	(France) (Australia)	Fabrice Santoro; Richard Fromberg	3; 6	4; 6	6^{4} 7^{7}
3	(France) (Australia)	Guy Forget / Henri Leconte; Mark Kratzmann / Todd Woodbridge	6^{2} 7^{7}	7; 5	5; 7	7^{7} 6^{2}	6; 4
4	(France) (Australia)	Guy Forget; Richard Fromberg	7^{7} 6^{2}	6^{8} 7^{10}	3; 6	3; 6
5	(France) (Australia)	Fabrice Santoro; Wally Masur	6; 3	6; 4	4; 6	6; 1

=== 1992 ===
World Group First round

Yugoslavia
0
Lefkotheo, Nicosia, Cyprus
31 January–2 February 1992
Carpet (indoors)

Australia
5

			1	2	3	4	5
1	(Socialist Federal Republic of Yugoslavia) (Australia)	Slobodan Živojinović; Richard Fromberg	6^{6} 7^{8}					retired
2	(Socialist Federal Republic of Yugoslavia) (Australia)	Srđan Muškatirović; Wally Masur	4; 6	1; 6	2; 6
3	(Socialist Federal Republic of Yugoslavia) (Australia)	Nebojša Đorđević / Aleksandar Kitinov; John Fitzgerald / Todd Woodbridge	5; 7	3; 6	6^{2} 7^{7}
4	(Socialist Federal Republic of Yugoslavia) (Australia)	Nebojša Đorđević; Wally Masur	3; 6	0; 6
5	(Socialist Federal Republic of Yugoslavia) (Australia)	Srđan Muškatirović; Richard Fromberg	0; 6	3; 6

World Group Quarterfinals

Sweden
5
Victoriastadion, Lund, Sweden
27–29 March 1992
Carpet (indoors)

Australia
0

			1	2	3	4	5
1	(Sweden) (Australia)	Magnus Gustafsson; Wally Masur	7; 5	6; 4	6; 4
2	(Sweden) (Australia)	Stefan Edberg; Richard Fromberg	6; 3	6; 2	6; 3
3	(Sweden) (Australia)	Stefan Edberg / Anders Järryd; John Fitzgerald / Todd Woodbridge	6; 3	6; 3	3; 6	6; 1
4	(Sweden) (Australia)	Stefan Edberg; Wally Masur	6; 4	7^{7} 6^{4}
5	(Sweden) (Australia)	Christian Bergström; Richard Fromberg	6; 4	7; 5

=== 1993 ===
World Group First round

Australia
4
Kooyong Stadium, Melbourne, Australia
26–28 March 1993
Grass

United States
1

			1	2	3	4	5
1	(Australia) (United States)	Wally Masur; Brad Gilbert	6; 3	6^{6} 7^{8}	6; 4	6; 2
2	(Australia) (United States)	Mark Woodforde; David Wheaton	3; 6	7^{7} 6^{1}	6; 4	6; 4
3	(Australia) (United States)	Todd Woodbridge / Mark Woodforde; Jim Grabb / Richey Reneberg	7^{7} 6^{5}	6; 2	3; 6	6^{3} 7^{7}	6; 4
4	(Australia) (United States)	Mark Woodforde; Brad Gilbert	5; 7	6; 1	6; 4
5	(Australia) (United States)	Wally Masur; David Wheaton	4; 6	5; 7

World Group Quarterfinals

Italy
2
Florence Tennis Club, Florence, Italy
16–18 July 1993
Clay

Australia
3

			1	2	3	4	5
1	(Italy) (Australia)	Renzo Furlan; Richard Fromberg	6^{5} 7^{7}	6^{3} 7^{7}	4; 6
2	(Italy) (Australia)	Stefano Pescosolido; Mark Woodforde	6; 3	7; 5	5; 7	6; 4
3	(Italy) (Australia)	Paolo Canè / Diego Nargiso; Todd Woodbridge / Mark Woodforde	7^{8} 6^{6}	6^{5} 7^{7}	2; 6	3; 6
4	(Italy) (Australia)	Paolo Canè; Mark Woodforde	6; 2	1; 6	7; 5	6; 4
5	(Italy) (Australia)	Stefano Pescosolido; Richard Fromberg	6^{3} 7^{7}	1; 6	4; 6

World Group Semifinals

India
0
Chandigarh Stadium, Chandigarh, India
24–26 September 1993
Grass

Australia
5

			1	2	3	4	5
1	(India) (Australia)	Leander Paes; Jason Stoltenberg	3; 6	6^{5} 7^{7}	2; 6
2	(India) (Australia)	Ramesh Krishnan; Wally Masur	2; 6	0; 6	4; 6
3	(India) (Australia)	Ramesh Krishnan / Leander Paes; Todd Woodbridge / Mark Woodforde	2; 6	6^{3} 7^{7}	1; 6
4	(India) (Australia)	Leander Paes; Wally Masur	4; 6	2; 6
5	(India) (Australia)	Zeeshan Ali; Jason Stoltenberg	3; 6	3; 6

World Group Final

Germany
4
Messe Düsseldorf Exhibition Hall, Düsseldorf, Germany
3–5 December 1993
Clay (indoors)

Australia
1

			1	2	3	4	5
1	(Germany) (Australia)	Michael Stich; Jason Stoltenberg	6^{2} 7^{7}	6; 3	6; 1	4; 6	6; 3
2	(Germany) (Australia)	Marc-Kevin Goellner; Richard Fromberg	6; 3	7; 5	6^{8} 7^{10}	2; 6	7; 9
3	(Germany) (Australia)	Patrik Kühnen / Michael Stich; Todd Woodbridge / Mark Woodforde	7^{7} 6^{4}	4; 6	6; 3	7^{7} 6^{4}
4	(Germany) (Australia)	Michael Stich; Richard Fromberg	6; 4	6; 2	6; 2
5	(Germany) (Australia)	Marc-Kevin Goellner; Jason Stoltenberg	6; 1	6^{2} 7^{7}	7^{7} 6^{3}

=== 1994 ===
World Group First round

Russia
4
Sports Forum, Saint Petersburg, Russia
25–27 March 1994
Carpet (indoors)

Australia
1

			1	2	3	4	5
1	(Russia) (Australia)	Yevgeny Kafelnikov; Pat Rafter	6; 3	6; 0	6; 4
2	(Russia) (Australia)	Alexander Volkov; Jamie Morgan	6; 4	6^{3} 7^{7}	6^{2} 7^{7}	1; 6
3	(Russia) (Australia)	Yevgeny Kafelnikov / Andrei Olhovskiy; Todd Woodbridge / Mark Woodforde	6; 4	6; 0	3; 6	4; 6	6; 3
4	(Russia) (Australia)	Alexander Volkov; Pat Rafter	6; 4	7^{7} 6^{4}	6; 3
5	(Russia) (Australia)	Yevgeny Kafelnikov; Jamie Morgan	6; 3	6^{6} 7^{8}	7; 5

World Group Qualifying round

New Zealand
1
King Edward Barracks, Christchurch, New Zealand
23–25 September 1994
Carpet (indoors)

Australia
4

			1	2	3	4	5
1	(New Zealand) (Australia)	Brett Steven; Mark Woodforde	7; 5	6^{4} 7^{7}	6; 3	7; 5
2	(New Zealand) (Australia)	James Greenhalgh; Pat Rafter	5; 7	2; 6	3; 6
3	(New Zealand) (Australia)	Kelly Evernden / Brett Steven; Todd Woodbridge / Mark Woodforde	3; 6	4; 6	1; 6
4	(New Zealand) (Australia)	Brett Steven; Pat Rafter	5; 7	4; 6	1; 6
5	(New Zealand) (Australia)	James Greenhalgh; Mark Woodforde	6; 3	1; 6	2; 6

=== 1995 ===
World Group First round

South Africa
3
Westridge Park Stadium, Durban, South Africa
3–6 February 1995
Hard

Australia
2

			1	2	3	4	5
1	(South Africa) (Australia)	Marcos Ondruska; Pat Rafter	3; 6	4; 6	6; 2	4; 6
2	(South Africa) (Australia)	Wayne Ferreira; Mark Woodforde	7^{8} 6^{6}	7; 5	6; 3
3	(South Africa) (Australia)	Wayne Ferreira / Piet Norval; Todd Woodbridge / Mark Woodforde	5; 7	3; 6	6^{5} 7^{7}
4	(South Africa) (Australia)	Wayne Ferreira; Pat Rafter	6; 2	3; 6	6; 4	6; 2
5	(South Africa) (Australia)	Marcos Ondruska; Mark Woodforde	6; 4	6; 2	1; 0			retired

World Group Qualifying round

Hungary
3
Kisstadion, Budapest, Hungary
22–24 September 1995
Clay

Australia
2

			1	2	3	4	5
1	(Hungary) (Australia)	Sándor Noszály; Mark Philippoussis	1; 6	2; 6	3; 6
2	(Hungary) (Australia)	József Krocskó; Todd Woodbridge	5; 7	6; 2	6; 3	6; 1
3	(Hungary) (Australia)	Gábor Köves / László Markovits; Todd Woodbridge / Mark Woodforde	6; 1	7^{9} 6^{7}	0; 6	3; 6	2; 6
4	(Hungary) (Australia)	Sándor Noszály; Todd Woodbridge	6^{4} 7^{7}	6; 3	1; 6	6; 2	7; 5
5	(Hungary) (Australia)	József Krocskó; Mark Philippoussis	6; 4	6; 4	3; 6	6; 3

=== 1996 ===
Asia/Oceania Group I
First round

Australia
3
Flinders Park, Melbourne, Australia
9–11 February 1996
Hard (indoors)

Chinese Taipei
0

			1	2	3	4	5
1	(Australia) (Chinese Taipei)	Jason Stoltenberg; Chen Chih-jung	6; 1	6; 2	7^{7} 6^{1}
2	(Australia) (Chinese Taipei)	Todd Woodbridge; Chen Wei-ju	6; 2	6; 1	6; 2
3	(Australia) (Chinese Taipei)	Richard Fromberg / Todd Woodbridge; Chen Chih-jung / Lien Yu-hui	6; 4	6; 4	6; 2
4	(Australia) (Chinese Taipei)	Todd Woodbridge; Chen Chih-jung						not played
5	(Australia) (Chinese Taipei)	Jason Stoltenberg; Chen Wei-ju						not played

Asia/Oceania Group I
Second round

Japan
0
Utsubo Tennis Centre, Osaka, Japan
5–7 April 1996
Hard

Australia
5

			1	2	3	4	5
1	(Japan) (Australia)	Hideki Kaneko; Todd Woodbridge	6; 4	7^{7} 6^{4}	5; 7	2; 6	2; 6
2	(Japan) (Australia)	Shuzo Matsuoka; Jason Stoltenberg	4; 6	6; 3	3; 6	6; 3	4; 5	retired
3	(Japan) (Australia)	Satoshi Iwabuchi / Takao Suzuki; Todd Woodbridge / Mark Woodforde	3; 6	1; 6	3; 6
4	(Japan) (Australia)	Shuzo Matsuoka; Todd Woodbridge	3; 6	2; 6
5	(Japan) (Australia)	Hideki Kaneko; Jason Stoltenberg	1; 6	2; 6

World Group Qualifying round

Croatia
1
Teniski klub Split, Split, Croatia
20–22 September 1996
Clay

Australia
4

			1	2	3	4	5
1	(Croatia) (Australia)	Saša Hiršzon; Mark Philippoussis	2; 6	3; 6	2; 6
2	(Croatia) (Australia)	Goran Ivanišević; Jason Stoltenberg	6; 4	3; 6	6; 3	6^{5} 7^{7}	2; 6
3	(Croatia) (Australia)	Saša Hiršzon / Goran Ivanišević; Pat Rafter / Mark Woodforde	3; 6	2; 6	4; 6
4	(Croatia) (Australia)	Goran Orešić; Mark Philippoussis	1; 6	4; 6
5	(Croatia) (Australia)	Saša Hiršzon; Jason Stoltenberg	6; 2	6; 2

=== 1997 ===
World Group First round

Australia
4
White City Stadium, Sydney, Australia
7–9 February 1997
Grass

France
1

			1	2	3	4	5
1	(Australia) (France)	Pat Rafter; Cédric Pioline	3; 6	6^{5} 7^{7}	6; 4	7; 5	6; 4
2	(Australia) (France)	Mark Woodforde; Arnaud Boetsch	6; 4	6; 4	6; 3
3	(Australia) (France)	Todd Woodbridge / Mark Woodforde; Guy Forget / Guillaume Raoux	7^{8} 6^{6}	6; 4	6; 3
4	(Australia) (France)	Sandon Stolle; Cédric Pioline	7^{7} 6^{3}	6; 4
5	(Australia) (France)	Pat Rafter; Arnaud Boetsch	6; 4	4; 6	6^{5} 7^{7}

World Group Quarterfinals

Australia
5
Memorial Drive Park, Adelaide, Australia
4–6 April 1997
Grass

Czech Republic
0

			1	2	3	4	5
1	(Australia) (Czech Republic)	Pat Rafter; Martin Damm	6; 1	7^{9} 6^{7}	4; 6	6; 4
2	(Australia) (Czech Republic)	Mark Philippoussis; David Rikl	6; 1	6; 4	2; 6	6; 4
3	(Australia) (Czech Republic)	Todd Woodbridge / Mark Woodforde; Martin Damm / David Rikl	4; 6	6; 1	7; 5	6; 4
4	(Australia) (Czech Republic)	Mark Philippoussis; Martin Damm	6; 4	6; 2
5	(Australia) (Czech Republic)	Pat Rafter; David Rikl	7^{15} 6^{13}	0; 6	6; 2

World Group Semifinals

United States
4
William H.G. FitzGerald Tennis Center, Washington, DC, United States
19–21 September 1997
Hard

Australia
1

			1	2	3	4	5
1	(United States) (Australia)	Michael Chang; Pat Rafter	6; 4	1; 6	6; 3	6; 4
2	(United States) (Australia)	Pete Sampras; Mark Philippoussis	6; 1	6; 2	7^{7} 6^{5}
3	(United States) (Australia)	Todd Martin / Pete Sampras; Todd Woodbridge / Mark Woodforde	6; 3	6^{5} 7^{7}	2; 6	4; 6
4	(United States) (Australia)	Pete Sampras; Pat Rafter	6^{6} 7^{8}	6; 1	6; 1	6; 4
5	(United States) (Australia)	Michael Chang; Mark Philippoussis	7^{7} 6^{5}	7^{7} 6^{2}

=== 1998 ===
World Group First round

Australia
2
Mildura Lawn Tennis Club, Mildura, Australia
3–5 April 1998
Grass

Zimbabwe
3

			1	2	3	4	5
1	(Australia) (Zimbabwe)	Jason Stoltenberg; Wayne Black	6; 3	6; 4	5; 7	7; 5
2	(Australia) (Zimbabwe)	Pat Rafter; Byron Black	6; 3	3; 6	2; 6	6^{0} 7^{7}
3	(Australia) (Zimbabwe)	Todd Woodbridge / Mark Woodforde; Byron Black / Wayne Black	6; 4	7^{8} 6^{6}	6; 2
4	(Australia) (Zimbabwe)	Mark Woodforde; Wayne Black	3; 6	5; 7	7^{7} 6^{3}	4; 6
5	(Australia) (Zimbabwe)	Jason Stoltenberg; Byron Black	2; 6	6; 3	3; 6	4; 6

World Group Qualifying round

Australia
5
Townsville Entertainment and Convention Centre, Townsville, Australia
25–27 September 1998
Hard (indoors)

Uzbekistan
0

			1	2	3	4	5
1	(Australia) (Uzbekistan)	Pat Rafter; Oleg Ogorodov	6; 3	6; 3	6; 4
2	(Australia) (Uzbekistan)	Jason Stoltenberg; Vadim Kutsenko	7; 5	6; 1	6; 0
3	(Australia) (Uzbekistan)	Todd Woodbridge / Mark Woodforde; Oleg Ogorodov / Dmitri Tomashevich	6; 3	7^{7} 6^{3}	7^{7} 6^{4}
4	(Australia) (Uzbekistan)	Pat Rafter; Dmitri Tomashevich	6; 2	6; 4
5	(Australia) (Uzbekistan)	Jason Stoltenberg; Oleg Ogorodov	6; 3	6; 3

=== 1999 ===
World Group First round

Zimbabwe
1
Harare Sports Club, Harare, Zimbabwe
2–4 April 1999
Hard (indoors)

Australia
4

			1	2	3	4	5
1	(Zimbabwe) (Australia)	Byron Black; Mark Philippoussis	6; 3	3; 6	4; 6	6; 3	7; 5
2	(Zimbabwe) (Australia)	Wayne Black; Pat Rafter	3; 6	6; 3	6^{4} 7^{7}	2; 6
3	(Zimbabwe) (Australia)	Byron Black / Wayne Black; Todd Woodbridge / Mark Woodforde	4; 6	6; 2	3; 6	0; 6
4	(Zimbabwe) (Australia)	Byron Black; Pat Rafter	4; 6	6^{2} 7^{7}	2; 6
5	(Zimbabwe) (Australia)	Wayne Black; Mark Philippoussis	3; 6	2; 6

World Group Quarterfinals

United States
1
Longwood Cricket Club, Chestnut Hill, MA, United States
16–18 July 1999
Hard

Australia
4

			1	2	3	4	5
1	(United States) (Australia)	Todd Martin; Lleyton Hewitt	4; 6	7^{7} 6^{1}	3; 6	0; 6
2	(United States) (Australia)	Jim Courier; Pat Rafter	6^{5} 7^{7}	4; 6	4; 6
3	(United States) (Australia)	Alex O'Brien / Pete Sampras; Sandon Stolle / Mark Woodforde	6; 4	6; 3	3; 6	4; 6	6; 3
4	(United States) (Australia)	Todd Martin; Pat Rafter	6; 4	7; 5	3; 6	2; 6	4; 6
5	(United States) (Australia)	Alex O'Brien; Lleyton Hewitt	5; 7	4; 6

World Group Semifinals

Australia
4
ANZ Stadium, Brisbane, Australia
24–26 September 1999
Grass

Russia
1

			1	2	3	4	5
1	(Australia) (Russia)	Lleyton Hewitt; Marat Safin	7^{7} 6^{0}	6; 2	4; 6	6; 3
2	(Australia) (Russia)	Wayne Arthurs; Yevgeny Kafelnikov	6; 2	6^{4} 7^{7}	6; 2	6; 0
3	(Australia) (Russia)	Sandon Stolle / Mark Woodforde; Yevgeny Kafelnikov / Andrei Olhovskiy	1; 6	4; 6	6; 4	6; 4	6; 8
4	(Australia) (Russia)	Lleyton Hewitt; Yevgeny Kafelnikov	6; 4	7; 5	6; 2
5	(Australia) (Russia)	Wayne Arthurs; Marat Safin	6; 3	6; 2

World Group Final

France
2
Acropolis Exhibition Hall, Nice, France
3–5 December 1999
Clay (indoors)

Australia
3

			1	2	3	4	5
1	(France) (Australia)	Sébastien Grosjean; Mark Philippoussis	4; 6	2; 6	4; 6
2	(France) (Australia)	Cédric Pioline; Lleyton Hewitt	7^{9} 6^{7}	7^{8} 6^{6}	7; 5
3	(France) (Australia)	Olivier Delaître / Fabrice Santoro; Todd Woodbridge / Mark Woodforde	6; 2	5; 7	2; 6	2; 6
4	(France) (Australia)	Cédric Pioline; Mark Philippoussis	3; 6	7; 5	1; 6	2; 6
5	(France) (Australia)	Sébastien Grosjean; Lleyton Hewitt	6; 4	6; 3

== 2000s ==
=== 2000 ===
World Group First round

Switzerland
2
Saalsporthalle, Zürich, Switzerland
4–6 February 2000
Carpet (indoors)

Australia
3

			1	2	3	4	5
1	(Switzerland) (Australia)	George Bastl; Lleyton Hewitt	6; 4	3; 6	2; 6	4; 6
2	(Switzerland) (Australia)	Roger Federer; Mark Philippoussis	6; 4	7^{7} 6^{3}	4; 6	6; 4
3	(Switzerland) (Australia)	Roger Federer / Lorenzo Manta; Wayne Arthurs / Sandon Stolle	3; 6	6; 3	6; 4	7^{7} 6^{4}
4	(Switzerland) (Australia)	Roger Federer; Lleyton Hewitt	2; 6	6; 3	6^{2} 7^{7}	1; 6
5	(Switzerland) (Australia)	George Bastl; Mark Philippoussis	7^{7} 6^{3}	4; 6	6; 3	3; 6	4; 6

World Group Quarterfinals

Australia
3
Memorial Drive, Adelaide, Australia
7–9 April 2000
Grass

Germany
2

			1	2	3	4	5
1	(Australia) (Germany)	Lleyton Hewitt; Michael Kohlmann	6; 1	6; 1	6; 2
2	(Australia) (Germany)	Wayne Arthurs; David Prinosil	7^{7} 6^{4}	3; 6	7^{7} 6^{3}	6^{7} 7^{9}	11; 9
3	(Australia) (Germany)	Pat Rafter / Mark Woodforde; Marc-Kevin Goellner / David Prinosil	6; 3	6; 2	2; 6	6^{4} 7^{7}	10; 8
4	(Australia) (Germany)	Lleyton Hewitt; Rainer Schüttler	6; 2	3; 6	4; 6
5	(Australia) (Germany)	Wayne Arthurs; Michael Kohlmann	5; 7	6^{5} 7^{7}

World Group Semifinals

Australia
5
ANZ Stadium, Brisbane, Australia
14–16 July 2000
Grass

Brazil
0

			1	2	3	4	5
1	(Australia) (Brazil)	Pat Rafter; Gustavo Kuerten	6; 3	6; 2	6; 3
2	(Australia) (Brazil)	Lleyton Hewitt; Fernando Meligeni	6; 4	6; 2	6; 3
3	(Australia) (Brazil)	Sandon Stolle / Mark Woodforde; Gustavo Kuerten / Jaime Oncins	6^{3} 7^{7}	6; 4	3; 6	6; 3	6; 4
4	(Australia) (Brazil)	Lleyton Hewitt; André Sá	6; 4	6; 1
5	(Australia) (Brazil)	Pat Rafter; Fernando Meligeni	6; 3	6; 4

World Group Final

Spain
3
Palau Sant Jordi, Barcelona, Spain
8–10 December 2000
Clay (indoors)

Australia
1

			1	2	3	4	5
1	(Spain) (Australia)	Albert Costa; Lleyton Hewitt	6; 3	1; 6	6; 2	4; 6	4; 6
2	(Spain) (Australia)	Juan Carlos Ferrero; Pat Rafter	6^{4} 7^{7}	7^{7} 6^{2}	6; 2	3; 1		retired
3	(Spain) (Australia)	Joan Balcells / Àlex Corretja; Sandon Stolle / Mark Woodforde	6; 4	6; 4	6; 4
4	(Spain) (Australia)	Juan Carlos Ferrero; Lleyton Hewitt	6; 2	7^{7} 6^{5}	4; 6	6; 4
5	(Spain) (Australia)	Albert Costa; Pat Rafter						not played

=== 2001 ===
World Group First round

Australia
4
Royal King's Park Tennis Club, Perth, Australia
9–11 February 2001
Grass

Ecuador
1

			1	2	3	4	5
1	(Australia) (Ecuador)	Pat Rafter; Nicolás Lapentti	6; 3	6; 0	7; 5
2	(Australia) (Ecuador)	Lleyton Hewitt; Giovanni Lapentti	6; 3	6; 2	6; 2
3	(Australia) (Ecuador)	Wayne Arthurs / Todd Woodbridge; Giovanni Lapentti / Nicolás Lapentti	2; 6	6; 2	6; 1	6^{1} 7^{7}	10; 12
4	(Australia) (Ecuador)	Lleyton Hewitt; Nicolás Lapentti	6; 2	6; 1	6; 1
5	(Australia) (Ecuador)	Pat Rafter; Giovanni Lapentti	6; 3	6; 1

World Group Quarterfinals

Brazil
1
Florianópolis Court Tennis Centre, Florianópolis, Brazil
6–8 April 2001
Clay

Australia
3

			1	2	3	4	5
1	(Brazil) (Australia)	Gustavo Kuerten; Pat Rafter	4; 6	6; 4	7^{7} 6^{1}	2; 1		retired
2	(Brazil) (Australia)	Fernando Meligeni; Lleyton Hewitt	3; 6	3; 6	3; 6
3	(Brazil) (Australia)	Gustavo Kuerten / Jaime Oncins; Lleyton Hewitt / Pat Rafter	6^{7} 7^{9}	6^{3} 7^{7}	6^{5} 7^{7}
4	(Brazil) (Australia)	Gustavo Kuerten; Lleyton Hewitt	6^{5} 7^{7}	3; 6	6^{3} 7^{7}
5	(Brazil) (Australia)	Alexandre Simoni; Richard Fromberg	2; 6	4; 4				not completed

World Group Semifinals

Australia
4
Sydney Olympic Park Tennis Centre, Sydney, Australia
21–23 September 2001
Hard

Sweden
1

			1	2	3	4	5
1	(Australia) (Sweden)	Pat Rafter; Thomas Johansson	6; 3	7^{10} 6^{8}	3; 6	2; 6	3; 6
2	(Australia) (Sweden)	Lleyton Hewitt; Jonas Björkman	4; 6	6; 4	7^{7} 6^{5}	7^{7} 6^{2}
3	(Australia) (Sweden)	Wayne Arthurs / Todd Woodbridge; Jonas Björkman / Magnus Larsson	6^{3} 7^{7}	7^{7} 6^{2}	7^{7} 6^{5}	7^{7} 6^{3}
4	(Australia) (Sweden)	Lleyton Hewitt; Thomas Johansson	7^{7} 6^{3}	5; 7	6; 2	6; 1
5	(Australia) (Sweden)	Pat Rafter; Jonas Björkman	6; 3	6; 2

World Group Final

Australia
2
Rod Laver Arena, Melbourne Park, Melbourne, Australia
30 November–2 December 2001
Grass

France
3

			1	2	3	4	5
1	(Australia) (France)	Lleyton Hewitt; Nicolas Escudé	6; 4	3; 6	6; 3	3; 6	4; 6
2	(Australia) (France)	Pat Rafter; Sébastien Grosjean	6; 3	7^{8} 6^{6}	7; 5
3	(Australia) (France)	Lleyton Hewitt / Pat Rafter; Cédric Pioline / Fabrice Santoro	6; 2	3; 6	6^{5} 7^{7}	1; 6
4	(Australia) (France)	Lleyton Hewitt; Sébastien Grosjean	6; 3	6; 2	6; 3
5	(Australia) (France)	Wayne Arthurs; Nicolas Escudé	6^{3} 7^{7}	7^{7} 6^{5}	3; 6	3; 6

=== 2002 ===
World Group First round

Argentina
5
Buenos Aires Lawn Tennis Club, Buenos Aires, Argentina
8–10 February 2002
Clay

Australia
0

			1	2	3	4	5
1	(Argentina) (Australia)	Guillermo Cañas; Scott Draper	6; 4	6^{4} 7^{7}	5; 7	6; 4	6; 1
2	(Argentina) (Australia)	Gastón Gaudio; Andrew Ilie	6; 1	6; 1	6; 2
3	(Argentina) (Australia)	Lucas Arnold Ker / Guillermo Cañas; Wayne Arthurs / Todd Woodbridge	3; 6	6; 3	6; 4	1; 6	10; 8
4	(Argentina) (Australia)	Juan Ignacio Chela; Andrew Ilie	6; 1	6; 1
5	(Argentina) (Australia)	Gastón Gaudio; Scott Draper	6; 3	6; 2

World Group Qualifying round

Australia
5
Memorial Drive, Adelaide, Australia
20–22 September 2002
Hard

India
0

			1	2	3	4	5
1	(Australia) (India)	Lleyton Hewitt; Harsh Mankad	6; 1	7^{7} 6^{2}	6; 1
2	(Australia) (India)	Wayne Arthurs; Leander Paes	6; 4	3; 6	6; 3	6; 4
3	(Australia) (India)	Lleyton Hewitt / Todd Woodbridge; Leander Paes / Vishal Uppal	6; 3	7^{7} 6^{5}	6; 1
4	(Australia) (India)	Scott Draper; Rohan Bopanna	6; 3	7; 5
5	(Australia) (India)	Wayne Arthurs; Harsh Mankad	6; 4	3; 6	7; 5

=== 2003 ===
World Group First round

Australia
4
Sydney International Tennis Centre, Sydney, Australia
7–9 February 2003
Clay

Great Britain
1

			1	2	3	4	5
1	(Australia) (United Kingdom)	Mark Philippoussis; Alan Mackin	6; 3	6; 3	6; 3
2	(Australia) (United Kingdom)	Lleyton Hewitt; Alex Bogdanovic	7; 5	6; 1	6; 2
3	(Australia) (United Kingdom)	Lleyton Hewitt / Todd Woodbridge; Miles McLagan / Arvind Parmar	6; 1	6; 3	4; 6	6; 2
4	(Australia) (United Kingdom)	Wayne Arthurs; Miles McLagan	4; 6	6; 1	6; 4
5	(Australia) (United Kingdom)	Todd Woodbridge; Alex Bogdanovic	2; 6	6^{4} 7^{7}

World Group Quarterfinals

Sweden
0
Baltiska Hallen, Malmö, Sweden
4–6 April 2003
Hard (indoors)

Australia
5

			1	2	3	4	5
1	(Sweden) (Australia)	Jonas Björkman; Mark Philippoussis	4; 6	3; 6	3; 6
2	(Sweden) (Australia)	Thomas Enqvist; Lleyton Hewitt	4; 6	2; 6	7; 5	4; 6
3	(Sweden) (Australia)	Jonas Björkman / Thomas Enqvist; Wayne Arthurs / Todd Woodbridge	4; 6	2; 6	2; 6
4	(Sweden) (Australia)	Joachim Johansson; Wayne Arthurs	3; 6	6; 3	6^{4} 7^{7}
5	(Sweden) (Australia)	Magnus Norman; Mark Philippoussis	5; 7	7; 5	3; 6

World Group Semifinals

Australia
3
Rod Laver Arena, Melbourne, Australia
19–21 September 2003
Hard

Switzerland
2

			1	2	3	4	5
1	(Australia) (Switzerland)	Lleyton Hewitt; Michel Kratochvil	6; 4	6; 4	6; 1
2	(Australia) (Switzerland)	Mark Philippoussis; Roger Federer	3; 6	4; 6	6^{3} 7^{7}
3	(Australia) (Switzerland)	Wayne Arthurs / Todd Woodbridge; Roger Federer / Marc Rosset	4; 6	7^{7} 6^{5}	5; 7	6; 4	6; 4
4	(Australia) (Switzerland)	Lleyton Hewitt; Roger Federer	5; 7	2; 6	7^{7} 6^{4}	7; 5	6; 1
5	(Australia) (Switzerland)	Todd Woodbridge; Michel Kratochvil	4; 6					retired

World Group Final

Australia
3
Rod Laver Arena, Melbourne, Australia
28–30 November 2003
Grass

Spain
1

			1	2	3	4	5
1	(Australia) (Spain)	Lleyton Hewitt; Juan Carlos Ferrero	3; 6	6; 3	3; 6	7^{7} 6^{0}	6; 2
2	(Australia) (Spain)	Mark Philippoussis; Carlos Moyà	4; 6	4; 6	6; 4	6^{4} 7^{7}
3	(Australia) (Spain)	Wayne Arthurs / Todd Woodbridge; Àlex Corretja / Feliciano López	6; 3	6; 1	6; 3
4	(Australia) (Spain)	Mark Philippoussis; Juan Carlos Ferrero	7; 5	6; 3	1; 6	2; 6	6; 0
5	(Australia) (Spain)	Lleyton Hewitt; Carlos Moyà						not played

=== 2004 ===
World Group First round

Australia
1
Memorial Drive, Adelaide, Australia
6–8 February 2004
Hard

Sweden
4

			1	2	3	4	5
1	(Australia) (Sweden)	Mark Philippoussis; Thomas Enqvist	3; 6	4; 6	2; 6
2	(Australia) (Sweden)	Lleyton Hewitt; Robin Söderling	6; 4	6; 3	6; 1
3	(Australia) (Sweden)	Wayne Arthurs / Todd Woodbridge; Jonas Björkman / Joachim Johansson	6^{5} 7^{7}	4; 6	6; 2	7^{7} 6^{4}	5; 7
4	(Australia) (Sweden)	Mark Philippoussis; Jonas Björkman	5; 7	2; 6	2; 6
5	(Australia) (Sweden)	Wayne Arthurs; Thomas Enqvist	6^{8} 7^{10}	6; 3	4; 6

World Group Play-offs

Australia
4
Royal Kings Park, West Perth, Australia
24–26 September 2004
Grass

Morocco
1

			1	2	3	4	5
1	(Australia) (Morocco)	Wayne Arthurs; Mounir El Aarej	7^{8} 6^{6}	6; 4	6; 3
2	(Australia) (Morocco)	Lleyton Hewitt; Mehdi Tahiri	6; 0	6; 2	6; 2
3	(Australia) (Morocco)	Wayne Arthurs / Todd Woodbridge; Mounir El Aarej / Mehdi Tahiri	7^{10} 6^{8}	7^{7} 6^{2}	6; 3
4	(Australia) (Morocco)	Todd Reid; Mounir El Aarej	2; 6	3; 6
5	(Australia) (Morocco)	Todd Woodbridge; Mehdi Ziadi	6; 0	6; 2

=== 2005 ===
World Group First round

Australia
5
Sydney International Tennis Centre, Sydney, Australia
4–6 March 2005
Grass

Austria
0

			1	2	3	4	5
1	(Australia) (Austria)	Lleyton Hewitt; Alexander Peya	6; 2	6; 3	6; 4
2	(Australia) (Austria)	Wayne Arthurs; Jürgen Melzer	7^{7} 6^{5}	6; 2	6; 4
3	(Australia) (Austria)	Wayne Arthurs / Todd Woodbridge; Julian Knowle / Jürgen Melzer	4; 6	6; 3	2; 6	6; 4	7; 5
4	(Australia) (Austria)	Todd Woodbridge; Marco Mirnegg	6; 3	4; 6	7; 5
5	(Australia) (Austria)	Chris Guccione; Alexander Peya	6; 3	6; 4

World Group Quarterfinals

Australia
1
Sydney International Tennis Centre, Sydney, Australia
15–17 July 2005
Grass

Argentina
4

			1	2	3	4	5
1	(Australia) (Argentina)	Lleyton Hewitt; Guillermo Coria	7^{7} 6^{5}	6; 1	1; 6	6; 2
2	(Australia) (Argentina)	Wayne Arthurs; David Nalbandian	3; 6	6^{8} 7^{10}	7; 5	2; 6
3	(Australia) (Argentina)	Wayne Arthurs / Lleyton Hewitt; David Nalbandian / Mariano Puerta	6^{6} 7^{8}	4; 6	3; 6
4	(Australia) (Argentina)	Lleyton Hewitt; David Nalbandian	2; 6	4; 6	4; 6
5	(Australia) (Argentina)	Peter Luczak; Guillermo Coria	3; 6	6^{11} 7^{13}

=== 2006 ===
World Group First round

Switzerland
2
SEG Geneva Arena, Geneva, Switzerland
10–12 February 2006
Clay (indoors)

Australia
3

			1	2	3	4	5
1	(Switzerland) (Australia)	Michael Lammer; Peter Luczak	6; 1	3; 6	0; 6	3; 6
2	(Switzerland) (Australia)	Stanislas Wawrinka; Chris Guccione	7; 5	3; 6	6; 4	7^{8} 6^{6}
3	(Switzerland) (Australia)	Yves Allegro / Stanislas Wawrinka; Wayne Arthurs / Paul Hanley	6^{6} 7^{8}	4; 6	6; 4	6^{5} 7^{7}
4	(Switzerland) (Australia)	Stanislas Wawrinka; Peter Luczak	6; 4	6; 2	6^{7} 7^{9}	6; 2
5	(Switzerland) (Australia)	George Bastl; Chris Guccione	5; 7	3; 6	6^{7} 7^{9}

World Group Quarterfinals

Australia
5
Kooyong Stadium, Melbourne, Australia
7–9 April 2006
Hard

Belarus
0

			1	2	3	4	5
1	(Australia) (Belarus)	Chris Guccione; Max Mirnyi	7^{7} 6^{4}	3; 6	7; 5	3; 6	6; 4
2	(Australia) (Belarus)	Lleyton Hewitt; Vladimir Voltchkov	6; 2	6; 1	6; 2
3	(Australia) (Belarus)	Wayne Arthurs / Paul Hanley; Max Mirnyi / Vladimir Voltchkov	3; 6	6; 4	5; 7	6; 3	7; 5
4	(Australia) (Belarus)	Wayne Arthurs; Serguei Tarasevitch	7^{8} 6^{6}	6; 2
5	(Australia) (Belarus)	Chris Guccione; Alexandr Zotov	6; 1	6; 3

World Group Semifinals

Argentina
5
Parque Roca, Buenos Aires, Argentina
22–24 September 2006
Clay

Australia
0

			1	2	3	4	5
1	(Argentina) (Australia)	David Nalbandian; Mark Philippoussis	6; 4	6; 3	6; 3
2	(Argentina) (Australia)	José Acasuso; Lleyton Hewitt	1; 6	6; 4	4; 6	6; 2	6; 1
3	(Argentina) (Australia)	Agustín Calleri / David Nalbandian; Wayne Arthurs / Paul Hanley	6; 4	6; 4	7; 5
4	(Argentina) (Australia)	Agustín Calleri; Paul Hanley	6; 0	6; 3
5	(Argentina) (Australia)	Juan Ignacio Chela; Wayne Arthurs						w/o

=== 2007 ===
World Group First round

Belgium
3
Country Hall du Sart Tilman, Liège, Belgium
9–11 February 2007
Clay (indoors)

Australia
2

			1	2	3	4	5
1	(Belgium) (Australia)	Kristof Vliegen; Lleyton Hewitt	4; 6	6; 4	3; 6	6; 3	6; 4
2	(Belgium) (Australia)	Olivier Rochus; Chris Guccione	3; 6	7; 5	6; 2	6; 3
3	(Belgium) (Australia)	Olivier Rochus / Kristof Vliegen; Paul Hanley / Lleyton Hewitt	2; 6	4; 6	2; 6
4	(Belgium) (Australia)	Olivier Rochus; Lleyton Hewitt	2; 6	3; 6	7^{7} 6^{4}	6; 3	1; 6
5	(Belgium) (Australia)	Kristof Vliegen; Chris Guccione	6; 4	6; 4	6; 4

World Group Play-offs

Serbia
4
Beogradska Arena, Belgrade, Serbia
21–23 September 2007
Clay (indoors)

Australia
1

			1	2	3	4	5
1	(Serbia) (Australia)	Novak Djokovic; Peter Luczak	6; 1	6; 4	6; 2
2	(Serbia) (Australia)	Janko Tipsarević; Lleyton Hewitt	2; 6	6; 3	6; 4	1; 6	1; 6
3	(Serbia) (Australia)	Novak Djokovic / Nenad Zimonjić; Lleyton Hewitt / Paul Hanley	3; 6	6; 4	6; 3	6; 2
4	(Serbia) (Australia)	Novak Djokovic; Chris Guccione	6; 3	7^{7} 6^{3}	7^{7} 6^{5}
5	(Serbia) (Australia)	Boris Pašanski; Peter Luczak	4; 6	6; 3	6; 1

=== 2008 ===
Asia/Oceania Group I
First round

Chinese Taipei
1
Yang-Ming Tennis Center, Kaohsiung, Chinese Taipei
8 – 10 February 2008
Hard

Australia
4

			1	2	3	4	5
1	(Chinese Taipei) (Australia)	Chen Ti; Lleyton Hewitt	4; 6	0; 6	3; 6
2	(Chinese Taipei) (Australia)	Lu Yen-hsun; Chris Guccione	6^{5} 7^{7}	4; 6	6^{9} 7^{11}
3	(Chinese Taipei) (Australia)	Lu Yen-hsun / Jimmy Wang; Paul Hanley / Lleyton Hewitt	6; 2	7^{7} 6^{4}	4; 6	2; 6	2; 6
4	(Chinese Taipei) (Australia)	Yang Tsung-hua; Alun Jones	6; 4	3; 6	2; 6
5	(Chinese Taipei) (Australia)	Chen Ti; Paul Hanley	7^{7} 6^{3}	6; 1

Asia/Oceania Group I
Second round

Australia
5
Townsville Entertainment and Convention Centre, Townsville, Australia
11 – 13 April 2008
Hard

Thailand
0

			1	2	3	4	5
1	(Australia) (Thailand)	Chris Guccione; Danai Udomchoke	6^{3} 7^{7}	7^{9} 6^{7}	4; 6	7^{8} 6^{6}	7; 5
2	(Australia) (Thailand)	Lleyton Hewitt; Kirati Siributwong	6; 0	6; 0	6; 1
3	(Australia) (Thailand)	Paul Hanley / Lleyton Hewitt; Weerapat Doakmaiklee / Kirati Siributwong	6; 3	6; 1	6; 0
4	(Australia) (Thailand)	Peter Luczak; Danai Udomchoke	6; 4	5; 7	6; 4
5	(Australia) (Thailand)	Chris Guccione; Weerapat Doakmaiklee	6; 2	7^{7} 6^{1}

World Group Play-offs

Chile
3
Estadio Militar Antofagasta, Antofagasta, Chile
September 19–21, 2008
Clay

Australia
2

			1	2	3	4	5
1	(Chile) (Australia)	Nicolás Massú; Chris Guccione	7^{7} 6^{5}	7^{7} 6^{5}	3; 6	7^{7} 6^{2}
2	(Chile) (Australia)	Fernando González; Peter Luczak	6; 2	6; 2	6; 3
3	(Chile) (Australia)	Fernando González / Nicolás Massú; Carsten Ball / Chris Guccione	7^{7} 6^{5}	6^{9} 7^{11}	3; 6	7; 5	5; 7
4	(Chile) (Australia)	Fernando González; Chris Guccione	7^{7} 6^{4}	7; 5	6; 3
5	(Chile) (Australia)	Paul Capdeville; Carsten Ball	3; 6	6^{4} 7^{7}

=== 2009 ===
Asia/Oceania Group I
First round

Australia
3
National Tennis Development Center (LTAT), Nonthaburi, Thailand
6–8 March 2009
Hard

Thailand
2

			1	2	3	4	5
1	(Australia) (Thailand)	Lleyton Hewitt; Kittipong Wachiramanowong	6; 3	6; 2	6; 1
2	(Australia) (Thailand)	Brydan Klein; Danai Udomchoke	2; 6	2; 6	5; 7
3	(Australia) (Thailand)	Carsten Ball / Chris Guccione; Sonchat Ratiwatana / Sanchai Ratiwatana	7^{7} 6^{3}	6; 4	6; 4
4	(Australia) (Thailand)	Lleyton Hewitt; Danai Udomchoke	6; 2	6; 4	6^{2} 7^{7}	4; 6	1; 6
5	(Australia) (Thailand)	Chris Guccione; Kittipong Wachiramanowong	6; 3	7; 5	7^{7} 6^{4}

== See also ==
- Australia Davis Cup team results (1905–1949)
- Australia Davis Cup team results (1950–1979)
- Australia Davis Cup team results (2010–present)
