= 1986 Davis Cup World Group =

- Date: 7 March – 28 December
- Edition: 6th

Champions
- Australia
- Davis Cup

The World Group was the highest level of Davis Cup competition in 1986.

Australia won the title, defeating the two-time defending champions Sweden in the final, 3–2. The final was held at the Kooyong Stadium in Melbourne, Australia, from 26 to 28 December. It was the Australian team's first Davis Cup title since 1983 and their 26th Davis Cup title overall.

== Participating teams ==
Participating teams
Australia	Czechoslovakia	Denmark	Ecuador
Great Britain	India	Italy	Mexico
New Zealand	Paraguay	Soviet Union	Spain
Sweden	United States	West Germany	Yugoslavia

=== Draw ===
First round 7–10 March
Mexico City, Mexico (clay)
West Germany	2
Mexico	3
Guayaquil, Ecuador (clay)
United States	3
Ecuador	2
Auckland, New Zealand (hard)
Australia	4
New Zealand	1
Telford, United Kingdom (indoor carpet)
Spain	1
Great Britain	4
Belgrade, Yugoslavia (indoor hard)
Soviet Union	2
Yugoslavia	3
Calcutta, India (grass)
India	1
Czechoslovakia	4
Palermo, Italy (clay)
Italy	4
Paraguay	1
Brøndby, Denmark (indoor carpet)
Denmark	0
Sweden	5

Quarterfinals; 18–20 July
Mexico City, Mexico (clay)
Mexico	1
United States	4
Wimbledon, United Kingdom (grass)
Australia	4
Great Britain	1
Sarajevo, Yugoslavia (indoor hard)
Yugoslavia	0
Czechoslovakia	5
Båstad, Sweden (clay)
Italy	0
Sweden	5

Semifinals; 3–5 October
Brisbane, Australia (grass)
United States	1
Australia	3
Prague, Czechoslovakia (clay)
Czechoslovakia	1
Sweden	4

Final; 26–28 December
Melbourne, Australia (grass)
Australia	3
Sweden	2

== First round ==
=== Mexico vs. West Germany ===
Mexico
3
Club Alemán de México, Mexico City, Mexico
7–10 March 1986
Clay

West Germany
2

			1	2	3	4	5
1	(Mexico) (West Germany)	Francisco Maciel; Michael Westphal	7; 5	6; 2	6; 0
2	(Mexico) (West Germany)	Leonardo Lavalle; Boris Becker	3; 6	2; 6	4; 6
3	(Mexico) (West Germany)	Leonardo Lavalle / Fernando Pérez Pascal; Boris Becker / Andreas Maurer	3; 6	6; 1	7; 5	3; 6	6; 4
4	(Mexico) (West Germany)	Francisco Maciel; Boris Becker	3; 6	1; 6	1; 6
5	(Mexico) (West Germany)	Leonardo Lavalle; Michael Westphal	8; 10	3; 6	6; 3	6; 4	6; 3

=== Ecuador vs. United States ===
Ecuador
2
Guayaquil Tenis Club, Guayaquil, Ecuador
7–9 March 1986
Clay

United States
3

			1	2	3	4	5
1	(Ecuador) (United States)	Andrés Gómez; Jimmy Arias	7; 5	4; 6	6; 8	9; 7	6; 4
2	(Ecuador) (United States)	Raúl Viver; Aaron Krickstein	6; 8	1; 6	3; 6
3	(Ecuador) (United States)	Andrés Gómez / Ricardo Ycaza; Ken Flach / Robert Seguso	2; 6	4; 6	6; 2	4; 6
4	(Ecuador) (United States)	Andrés Gómez; Aaron Krickstein	3; 6	7; 5	6; 1	6; 4
5	(Ecuador) (United States)	Raúl Viver; Jimmy Arias	3; 6	1; 6	4; 6

=== New Zealand vs. Australia ===
New Zealand
1
Stanley Street, Auckland, New Zealand
7–9 March 1986
Hard

Australia
4

			1	2	3	4	5
1	(New Zealand) (Australia)	Kelly Evernden; Paul McNamee	9; 11	3; 6	6; 4	6; 3	6; 4
2	(New Zealand) (Australia)	Chris Lewis; Peter McNamara	2; 6	5; 7	4; 6
3	(New Zealand) (Australia)	Kelly Evernden / Russell Simpson; Pat Cash / John Fitzgerald	2; 6	3; 6	3; 6
4	(New Zealand) (Australia)	Kelly Evernden; Peter McNamara	6; 3	1; 6	3; 6	1; 6
5	(New Zealand) (Australia)	Chris Lewis; Paul McNamee	4; 6	4; 6

=== Great Britain vs. Spain ===
Great Britain
4
Racquet Centre, Telford, United Kingdom
7–9 March 1986
Carpet (indoors)

Spain
1

			1	2	3	4	5
1	(United Kingdom) (Spain)	Jeremy Bates; Sergio Casal	6; 1	6; 3	3; 6	8; 6
2	(United Kingdom) (Spain)	John Lloyd; Emilio Sánchez	3; 6	6; 3	6; 3	6; 3
3	(United Kingdom) (Spain)	Colin Dowdeswell / John Lloyd; Sergio Casal / Emilio Sánchez	6; 4	6; 3	6; 3
4	(United Kingdom) (Spain)	Jeremy Bates; Emilio Sánchez	11; 9	6; 4
5	(United Kingdom) (Spain)	John Lloyd; Sergio Casal	4; 6	6; 8

=== Yugoslavia vs. Soviet Union ===
Yugoslavia
3
Pionir Hall, Belgrade, Yugoslavia
7–9 March 1986
Hard (indoors)

Soviet Union
2

			1	2	3	4	5
1	(Socialist Federal Republic of Yugoslavia) (Soviet Union)	Bruno Orešar; Andrei Chesnokov	10; 8	7; 5	2; 6	0; 6	5; 7
2	(Socialist Federal Republic of Yugoslavia) (Soviet Union)	Slobodan Živojinović; Alexander Zverev	3; 6	6; 8	6; 3	6; 4	6; 0
3	(Socialist Federal Republic of Yugoslavia) (Soviet Union)	Goran Prpić / Slobodan Živojinović; Sergey Leonyuk / Alexander Zverev	3; 6	2; 6	4; 6
4	(Socialist Federal Republic of Yugoslavia) (Soviet Union)	Bruno Orešar; Alexander Zverev	6; 3	6; 2	7; 5
5	(Socialist Federal Republic of Yugoslavia) (Soviet Union)	Slobodan Živojinović; Andrei Chesnokov	6; 3	6; 3	3; 6	6; 4

=== India vs. Czechoslovakia ===
India
1
Calcutta South Club, Calcutta, India
7–9 March 1986
Grass

Czechoslovakia
4

			1	2	3	4	5
1	(India) (Czechoslovakia)	Ramesh Krishnan; Tomáš Šmíd	6; 4	6; 2	7; 5
2	(India) (Czechoslovakia)	Vijay Amritraj; Miloslav Mečíř	0; 6	5; 7	4; 6
3	(India) (Czechoslovakia)	Anand Amritraj / Vijay Amritraj; Pavel Složil / Tomáš Šmíd	2; 6	11; 9	4; 6	4; 6
4	(India) (Czechoslovakia)	Vijay Amritraj; Tomáš Šmíd	6; 3	3; 6	1; 6	2; 6
5	(India) (Czechoslovakia)	Ramesh Krishnan; Miloslav Mečíř	3; 6	2; 6

=== Italy vs. Paraguay ===
Italy
4
Palermo, Italy
7–9 March 1986
Clay

Paraguay
1

			1	2	3	4	5
1	(Italy) (Paraguay)	Francesco Cancellotti; Hugo Chapacú	6; 4	6; 3	6; 1
2	(Italy) (Paraguay)	Claudio Panatta; Víctor Pecci	4; 6	11; 9	9; 7	10; 8
3	(Italy) (Paraguay)	Gianni Ocleppo / Claudio Panatta; Francisco González / Víctor Pecci	6; 4	1; 6	4; 6	5; 7
4	(Italy) (Paraguay)	Claudio Panatta; Hugo Chapacú	6; 3	7; 5	6; 3
5	(Italy) (Paraguay)	Francesco Cancellotti; Víctor Pecci	5; 7	1; 0				retired

=== Denmark vs. Sweden ===
Denmark
0
Brøndbyhallen, Brøndby, Denmark
7–9 March 1986
Carpet (indoors)

Sweden
5

			1	2	3	4	5
1	(Denmark) (Sweden)	Michael Tauson; Joakim Nyström	2; 6	2; 6	1; 6
2	(Denmark) (Sweden)	Morten Christensen; Mats Wilander	6; 8	2; 6	8; 10
3	(Denmark) (Sweden)	Peter Bastiansen / Michael Mortensen; Anders Järryd / Mats Wilander	3; 6	3; 6	4; 6
4	(Denmark) (Sweden)	Morten Christensen; Joakim Nyström	5; 7	1; 6
5	(Denmark) (Sweden)	Michael Tauson; Mats Wilander	2; 6	3; 6

== Quarterfinals ==
=== Mexico vs. United States ===
Mexico
1
Palacio de los Deportes, Mexico City, Mexico
18–20 July 1986
Clay

United States
4

			1	2	3	4	5
1	(Mexico) (United States)	Francisco Maciel; Tim Mayotte	2; 6	13; 11	6; 4	6; 4
2	(Mexico) (United States)	Leonardo Lavalle; Brad Gilbert	4; 6	4; 6	6; 3	4; 6
3	(Mexico) (United States)	Jorge Lozano / Fernando Pérez Pascal; Ken Flach / Robert Seguso	7; 5	3; 6	4; 6	4; 6
4	(Mexico) (United States)	Leonardo Lavalle; Tim Mayotte	5; 7	6; 4	6; 0	4; 6	7; 9
5	(Mexico) (United States)	Francisco Maciel; Brad Gilbert	5; 7	6; 1	5; 7

=== Great Britain vs. Australia ===
Great Britain
1
No. 1 Court, All England Club, Wimbledon, United Kingdom
18–20 July 1986
Grass

Australia
4

			1	2	3	4	5
1	(United Kingdom) (Australia)	Jeremy Bates; Pat Cash	4; 6	7; 9	4; 6
2	(United Kingdom) (Australia)	Andrew Castle; Paul McNamee	5; 7	1; 6	2; 6
3	(United Kingdom) (Australia)	Jeremy Bates / Colin Dowdeswell; Pat Cash / John Fitzgerald	1; 6	5; 7	4; 6
4	(United Kingdom) (Australia)	Andrew Castle; Pat Cash	6; 8	4; 6
5	(United Kingdom) (Australia)	Jeremy Bates; Paul McNamee	3; 6	6; 2	6; 4

=== Yugoslavia vs. Czechoslovakia ===
Yugoslavia
0
Zetra Olympic Hall, Sarajevo, Yugoslavia
18–20 July 1986
Hard (indoors)

Czechoslovakia
5

			1	2	3	4	5
1	(Socialist Federal Republic of Yugoslavia) (Czechoslovakia)	Slobodan Živojinović; Miloslav Mečíř	4; 6	6; 4	8; 10	4; 6
2	(Socialist Federal Republic of Yugoslavia) (Czechoslovakia)	Bruno Orešar; Milan Šrejber	2; 6	3; 6	4; 6
3	(Socialist Federal Republic of Yugoslavia) (Czechoslovakia)	Igor Flego / Slobodan Živojinović; Miloslav Mečíř / Tomáš Šmíd	3; 6	2; 6	4; 6
4	(Socialist Federal Republic of Yugoslavia) (Czechoslovakia)	Slobodan Živojinović; Milan Šrejber	10; 8	2; 6	13; 15
5	(Socialist Federal Republic of Yugoslavia) (Czechoslovakia)	Igor Flego; Miloslav Mečíř	2; 6	5; 7

=== Sweden vs. Italy ===
Sweden
5
Båstad Tennis Stadium, Båstad, Sweden
18–20 July 1986
Clay

Italy
0

			1	2	3	4	5
1	(Sweden) (Italy)	Mats Wilander; Paolo Canè	6; 8	6; 2	6; 3	6; 4
2	(Sweden) (Italy)	Joakim Nyström; Claudio Panatta	6; 2	6; 3	6; 1
3	(Sweden) (Italy)	Joakim Nyström / Mats Wilander; Paolo Canè / Claudio Panatta	6; 4	7; 5	6; 2
4	(Sweden) (Italy)	Stefan Edberg; Paolo Canè	6; 3	2; 6	6; 0
5	(Sweden) (Italy)	Mats Wilander; Claudio Panatta	6; 4	6; 3

== Semifinals ==
=== Australia vs. United States ===
Australia
3
Milton Courts, Brisbane, Australia
3–5 October 1986
Grass

United States
1

			1	2	3	4	5
1	(Australia) (United States)	Paul McNamee; Brad Gilbert	2; 6	6; 3	3; 6	6; 0	6; 1
2	(Australia) (United States)	Pat Cash; Tim Mayotte	4; 6	6; 1	6; 2	6; 2
3	(Australia) (United States)	Pat Cash / John Fitzgerald; Paul Annacone / Ken Flach	10; 8	6; 1	5; 7	11; 13	7; 9
4	(Australia) (United States)	Pat Cash; Brad Gilbert	3; 6	6; 2	6; 3	6; 4
5	(Australia) (United States)	Paul McNamee; Tim Mayotte	6; 3	2; 5				not completed

=== Czechoslovakia vs. Sweden ===
Czechoslovakia
1
Prague, Czechoslovakia
3–5 October 1986
Clay

Sweden
4

			1	2	3	4	5
1	(Czechoslovakia) (Sweden)	Miloslav Mečíř; Kent Carlsson	0; 6	2; 6	4; 6
2	(Czechoslovakia) (Sweden)	Milan Šrejber; Stefan Edberg	6; 3	4; 6	3; 6	6; 4	5; 7
3	(Czechoslovakia) (Sweden)	Miloslav Mečíř / Tomáš Šmíd; Stefan Edberg / Anders Järryd	7; 5	6; 2	6; 4
4	(Czechoslovakia) (Sweden)	Milan Šrejber; Mikael Pernfors	7; 5	0; 6	0; 6	5; 7
5	(Czechoslovakia) (Sweden)	Miloslav Mečíř; Stefan Edberg	4; 6	7; 9

== Final ==
=== Australia vs. Sweden ===
Australia
3
Kooyong Stadium, Melbourne, Australia
26–28 December 1986
Grass

Sweden
2

			1	2	3	4	5
1	(Australia) (Sweden)	Pat Cash; Stefan Edberg	13; 11	13; 11	6; 4
2	(Australia) (Sweden)	Paul McNamee; Mikael Pernfors	3; 6	1; 6	3; 6
3	(Australia) (Sweden)	Pat Cash / John Fitzgerald; Stefan Edberg / Anders Järryd	6; 3	6; 4	4; 6	6; 1
4	(Australia) (Sweden)	Pat Cash; Mikael Pernfors	2; 6	4; 6	6; 3	6; 4	6; 3
5	(Australia) (Sweden)	Paul McNamee; Stefan Edberg	8; 10	4; 6

== Relegation play-offs ==
The first-round losers played in the Relegation Play-offs. The winners of the play-offs advanced to the 1987 Davis Cup World Group, and the losers were relegated to their respective Zonal Regions.

=== Results summary ===
Date: 3–5 October

Home team	Score	Visiting team	Location	Door	Surface	Ref.
West Germany	5–0	Ecuador	Essen	Indoor	Carpet	
Spain	5–0	New Zealand	Barcelona	Outdoor	Clay	
India	4–1	Soviet Union	New Delhi	Outdoor	Grass	
Paraguay	3–2	Denmark	Asunción	Outdoor	Clay	

- India, Paraguay, Spain and West Germany remain in the World Group in 1987.
- Denmark, Ecuador, New Zealand and Soviet Union are relegated to Zonal competition in 1987.

=== West Germany vs. Ecuador ===
West Germany
5
Essen, West Germany
3–5 October 1986
Carpet (indoors)

Ecuador
0

			1	2	3	4	5
1	(West Germany) (Ecuador)	Boris Becker; Raúl Viver	6; 4	6; 4	10; 8
2	(West Germany) (Ecuador)	Eric Jelen; Andrés Gómez	6; 4	6; 3	7; 9	7; 5
3	(West Germany) (Ecuador)	Boris Becker / Eric Jelen; Andrés Gómez / Raúl Viver	6; 2	6; 4	6; 4
4	(West Germany) (Ecuador)	Eric Jelen; Raúl Viver	6; 4	6; 3
5	(West Germany) (Ecuador)	Boris Becker; Andrés Gómez	7; 5	6; 2

=== Spain vs. New Zealand ===
Spain
5
Barcelona, Spain
3–5 October 1986
Clay

New Zealand
0

			1	2	3	4	5
1	(Spain) (New Zealand)	Fernando Luna; Steve Guy	6; 3	9; 7	6; 1
2	(Spain) (New Zealand)	Emilio Sánchez; Bruce Derlin	6; 2	6; 0	6; 1
3	(Spain) (New Zealand)	Sergio Casal / Emilio Sánchez; Bruce Derlin / Kelly Evernden	6; 3	6; 2	7; 5
4	(Spain) (New Zealand)	Fernando Luna; Bruce Derlin	6; 4	8; 6
5	(Spain) (New Zealand)	Emilio Sánchez; Steve Guy	3; 6	6; 2	6; 3

=== India vs. Soviet Union ===
India
4
New Delhi, India
3–5 October 1986
Grass

Soviet Union
1

			1	2	3	4	5
1	(India) (Soviet Union)	Vijay Amritraj; Andrei Chesnokov	6; 1	6; 4	6; 4
2	(India) (Soviet Union)	Ramesh Krishnan; Alexander Zverev	3; 6	3; 6	6; 0	6; 1	6; 4
3	(India) (Soviet Union)	Anand Amritraj / Vijay Amritraj; Sergey Leonyuk / Alexander Zverev	2; 6	6; 3	6; 2	1; 6	6; 4
4	(India) (Soviet Union)	Ramesh Krishnan; Andrei Chesnokov	6; 4	6; 4
5	(India) (Soviet Union)	Srinivasan Vasudevan; Alexander Volkov	6; 3	5; 7	2; 6

=== Paraguay vs. Denmark ===
Paraguay
3
Asunción, Paraguay
3–5 October 1986
Clay

Denmark
2

			1	2	3	4	5
1	(Paraguay) (Denmark)	Víctor Pecci; Michael Tauson	6; 3	6; 2	6; 1
2	(Paraguay) (Denmark)	Francisco González; Peter Bastiansen	5; 7	4; 6	8; 6	4; 6
3	(Paraguay) (Denmark)	Francisco González / Víctor Pecci; Morten Christensen / Michael Mortensen	6; 4	6; 1	5; 7	6; 2
4	(Paraguay) (Denmark)	Francisco González; Michael Tauson	6; 3	5; 7	11; 9	6; 8	3; 6
5	(Paraguay) (Denmark)	Víctor Pecci; Peter Bastiansen	6; 2	1; 6	6; 0	6; 1
