= 1988 Davis Cup World Group =

- Date: 5 February – 18 December
- Edition: 8th

Champions
- West Germany
- Davis Cup

The World Group was the highest level of Davis Cup competition in 1988.

West Germany won the title, defeating the defending champions Sweden in the final, 4–1. The final was held at the Scandinavium in Gothenburg, Sweden, from 16 to 18 December. It was the West German team's first Davis Cup title (having previously come runner-up in 1970 and 1985), becoming the ninth nation to win the Davis Cup.

== Participating teams ==
Participating teams
Australia	Brazil	Czechoslovakia	Denmark
France	India	Israel	Italy
Mexico	New Zealand	Paraguay	Spain
Sweden	Switzerland	West Germany	Yugoslavia

=== Draw ===
First round 5–7 February
Gävle, Sweden (indoor carpet)
Sweden	5
New Zealand	0
Prague, Czechoslovakia (indoor carpet)
Czechoslovakia	5
Paraguay	0
Mexico City, Mexico (clay)
Australia	3
Mexico	2
Basel, Switzerland (indoor carpet)
France	4
Switzerland	1
Essen, West Germany (indoor carpet)
Brazil	0
West Germany	5
Aarhus, Denmark (indoor carpet)
Denmark	3
Spain	2
Palermo, Italy (clay)
Italy	4
Israel	1
New Delhi, India (grass)
Yugoslavia	3
India	2

Quarterfinals; 8–10 April
Norrköping, Sweden (indoor carpet)
Sweden	3
Czechoslovakia	2
Clermont-Ferrand, France (indoor clay)
Australia	0
France	5
Frankfurt, West Germany (indoor carpet)
West Germany	5
Denmark	0
Belgrade, Yugoslavia (indoor carpet)
Italy	1
Yugoslavia	4

Semifinals; 22–24 July
Båstad, Sweden (clay)
Sweden	4
France	1
Dortmund, West Germany (indoor carpet)
West Germany	5
Yugoslavia	0

Final; 16–18 December
Gothenburg, Sweden (indoor clay)
Sweden	1
West Germany	4

== First round ==
=== Sweden vs. New Zealand ===
Sweden
5
Gavlerinken, Gävle, Sweden
5–7 February 1988
Carpet (indoors)

New Zealand
0

			1	2	3	4	5
1	(Sweden) (New Zealand)	Anders Järryd; Bruce Derlin	14; 12	6; 2	6; 4
2	(Sweden) (New Zealand)	Stefan Edberg; Kelly Evernden	12; 10	6; 2	9; 7
3	(Sweden) (New Zealand)	Stefan Edberg / Anders Järryd; Kelly Evernden / David Lewis	6; 3	7; 5	6; 4
4	(Sweden) (New Zealand)	Anders Järryd; Kelly Evernden	8; 6	4; 6	11; 9
5	(Sweden) (New Zealand)	Stefan Edberg; Bruce Derlin	6; 1	6; 2

=== Czechoslovakia vs. Paraguay ===
Czechoslovakia
5
Prague, Czechoslovakia
5–7 February 1988
Carpet (indoors)

Paraguay
0

			1	2	3	4	5
1	(Czechoslovakia) (Paraguay)	Petr Korda; Hugo Chapacú	6; 2	6; 1	6; 2
2	(Czechoslovakia) (Paraguay)	Miloslav Mečíř; Francisco González	6; 2	6; 2	6; 2
3	(Czechoslovakia) (Paraguay)	Miloslav Mečíř / Tomáš Šmíd; Hugo Chapacú / Francisco González	6; 1	7; 5	6; 1
4	(Czechoslovakia) (Paraguay)	Miloslav Mečíř; Hugo Chapacú	6; 3	6; 1
5	(Czechoslovakia) (Paraguay)	Petr Korda; Francisco González	6; 4	6; 4

=== Mexico vs. Australia ===
Mexico
2
Estadio Federico Boehm, Mexico City, Mexico
5–8 February 1988
Clay

Australia
3

			1	2	3	4	5
1	(Mexico) (Australia)	Leonardo Lavalle; Pat Cash	7; 5	4; 6	1; 6	9; 11
2	(Mexico) (Australia)	Francisco Maciel; Wally Masur	3; 6	8; 6	6; 3	7; 5
3	(Mexico) (Australia)	Leonardo Lavalle / Jorge Lozano; Pat Cash / John Fitzgerald	2; 6	3; 6	2; 6
4	(Mexico) (Australia)	Leonardo Lavalle; Wally Masur	6; 2	6; 1	4; 6	9; 11	6; 2
5	(Mexico) (Australia)	Francisco Maciel; Pat Cash	2; 6	6; 4	5; 7	2; 6

=== Switzerland vs. France ===
Switzerland
1
Basel, Switzerland
5–7 February 1988
Carpet (indoors)

France
4

			1	2	3	4	5
1	(Switzerland) (France)	Roland Stadler; Yannick Noah	8; 10	11; 9	1; 6	5; 7
2	(Switzerland) (France)	Claudio Mezzadri; Henri Leconte	3; 6	6; 3	0; 6	8; 6	6; 2
3	(Switzerland) (France)	Heinz Günthardt / Claudio Mezzadri; Guy Forget / Yannick Noah	2; 6	4; 6	3; 6
4	(Switzerland) (France)	Roland Stadler; Henri Leconte	3; 6	4; 6	6; 4	1; 6
5	(Switzerland) (France)	Claudio Mezzadri; Yannick Noah	3; 6	6; 3	3; 6

=== West Germany vs. Brazil ===
West Germany
5
Essen, West Germany
5–7 February 1988
Carpet (indoors)

Brazil
0

			1	2	3	4	5
1	(West Germany) (Brazil)	Boris Becker; Cássio Motta	6; 0	6; 2	6; 0
2	(West Germany) (Brazil)	Carl-Uwe Steeb; Luiz Mattar	6; 1	6; 2	6; 3
3	(West Germany) (Brazil)	Boris Becker / Patrik Kühnen; Ricardo Acioly / Luiz Mattar	8; 6	15; 13	6; 4
4	(West Germany) (Brazil)	Patrik Kühnen; Luiz Mattar	9; 7	6; 3
5	(West Germany) (Brazil)	Carl-Uwe Steeb; Cássio Motta	6; 1	6; 2

=== Denmark vs. Spain ===
Denmark
3
Aarhus, Denmark
5–7 February 1988
Carpet (indoors)

Spain
2

			1	2	3	4	5
1	(Denmark) (Spain)	Michael Tauson; Sergio Casal	6; 4	6; 3	6; 2
2	(Denmark) (Spain)	Morten Christensen; Emilio Sánchez	5; 7	2; 6	6; 4	6; 3	6; 4
3	(Denmark) (Spain)	Peter Bastiansen / Michael Mortensen; Sergio Casal / Emilio Sánchez	5; 7	9; 11	2; 6
4	(Denmark) (Spain)	Morten Christensen; Sergio Casal	4; 6	4; 6	4; 6
5	(Denmark) (Spain)	Michael Tauson; Emilio Sánchez	3; 6	6; 1	13; 11	6; 4

=== Italy vs. Israel ===
Italy
4
Palermo, Italy
5–7 February 1988
Clay

Israel
1

			1	2	3	4	5
1	(Italy) (Israel)	Francesco Cancellotti; Gilad Bloom	6; 1	6; 2	6; 8	6; 4
2	(Italy) (Israel)	Paolo Canè; Amos Mansdorf	7; 5	6; 3	6; 2
3	(Italy) (Israel)	Paolo Canè / Diego Nargiso; Amos Mansdorf / Shahar Perkiss	5; 7	3; 6	4; 6
4	(Italy) (Israel)	Paolo Canè; Gilad Bloom	4; 6	6; 1	6; 1	6; 0
5	(Italy) (Israel)	Francesco Cancellotti; Amos Mansdorf	6; 4	6; 2

=== India vs. Yugoslavia ===
India
2
New Delhi, India
5–7 February 1988
Grass

Yugoslavia
3

			1	2	3	4	5
1	(India) (Socialist Federal Republic of Yugoslavia)	Vijay Amritraj; Bruno Orešar	6; 3	6; 0	6; 3
2	(India) (Socialist Federal Republic of Yugoslavia)	Ramesh Krishnan; Slobodan Živojinović	4; 6	4; 6	4; 6
3	(India) (Socialist Federal Republic of Yugoslavia)	Anand Amritraj / Vijay Amritraj; Goran Prpić / Slobodan Živojinović	5; 7	3; 6	6; 3	6; 2	7; 9
4	(India) (Socialist Federal Republic of Yugoslavia)	Ramesh Krishnan; Bruno Orešar	4; 6	6; 4	4; 6	6; 1	6; 3
5	(India) (Socialist Federal Republic of Yugoslavia)	Vijay Amritraj; Slobodan Živojinović	3; 6	4; 6	4; 6

== Quarterfinals ==
=== Sweden vs. Czechoslovakia ===
Sweden
3
Himmelstalundshallen, Norrköping, Sweden
8–10 April 1988
Carpet (indoors)

Czechoslovakia
2

			1	2	3	4	5
1	(Sweden) (Czechoslovakia)	Stefan Edberg; Tomáš Šmíd	6; 3	6; 4	6; 3
2	(Sweden) (Czechoslovakia)	Mats Wilander; Miloslav Mečíř	11; 13	3; 6	4; 6
3	(Sweden) (Czechoslovakia)	Stefan Edberg / Mats Wilander; Miloslav Mečíř / Tomáš Šmíd	8; 6	6; 4	8; 6
4	(Sweden) (Czechoslovakia)	Mats Wilander; Milan Šrejber	6; 3	2; 6	4; 6	3; 6
5	(Sweden) (Czechoslovakia)	Stefan Edberg; Miloslav Mečíř	4; 6	6; 1	4; 6	6; 4	9; 7

=== France vs. Australia ===
France
5
Maison des Sports, Clermont-Ferrand, France
8–10 April 1988
Clay (indoors)

Australia
0

			1	2	3	4	5
1	(France) (Australia)	Yannick Noah; Darren Cahill	3; 6	6; 4	6; 4	6; 2
2	(France) (Australia)	Henri Leconte; Mark Woodforde	6; 3	7; 9	3; 6	7; 5	6; 0
3	(France) (Australia)	Guy Forget / Yannick Noah; John Fitzgerald / Wally Masur	6; 3	7; 5	6; 4
4	(France) (Australia)	Henri Leconte; John Fitzgerald	9; 7	7; 5
5	(France) (Australia)	Yannick Noah; Mark Woodforde	6; 2	6; 4

=== West Germany vs. Denmark ===
West Germany
5
Frankfurt, West Germany
8–10 April 1988
Carpet (indoors)

Denmark
0

			1	2	3	4	5
1	(West Germany) (Denmark)	Eric Jelen; Morten Christensen	6; 3	6; 3	3; 6	6; 2
2	(West Germany) (Denmark)	Boris Becker; Michael Tauson	7; 5	6; 4	6; 3
3	(West Germany) (Denmark)	Boris Becker / Eric Jelen; Michael Mortensen / Michael Tauson	6; 3	6; 4	6; 4
4	(West Germany) (Denmark)	Boris Becker; Morten Christensen	6; 3	6; 4
5	(West Germany) (Denmark)	Eric Jelen; Michael Tauson	6; 2	7; 5

=== Yugoslavia vs. Italy ===
Yugoslavia
4
Belgrade, Yugoslavia
8–10 April 1988
Carpet (indoors)

Italy
1

			1	2	3	4	5
1	(Socialist Federal Republic of Yugoslavia) (Italy)	Bruno Orešar; Paolo Canè	1; 6	1; 6	3; 6
2	(Socialist Federal Republic of Yugoslavia) (Italy)	Slobodan Živojinović; Francesco Cancellotti	6; 4	9; 7	6; 3
3	(Socialist Federal Republic of Yugoslavia) (Italy)	Goran Prpić / Slobodan Živojinović; Paolo Canè / Simone Colombo	6; 4	6; 2	3; 6	6; 3
4	(Socialist Federal Republic of Yugoslavia) (Italy)	Bruno Orešar; Francesco Cancellotti	5; 7	3; 6	6; 3	6; 1	7; 5
5	(Socialist Federal Republic of Yugoslavia) (Italy)	Slobodan Živojinović; Paolo Canè	6; 4	6; 4

== Semifinals ==
=== Sweden vs. France ===
Sweden
4
Båstad Tennis Stadium, Båstad, Sweden
22–24 July 1988
Clay

France
1

			1	2	3	4	5
1	(Sweden) (France)	Mats Wilander; Yannick Noah	2; 6	13; 11	6; 3	3; 6	6; 0
2	(Sweden) (France)	Stefan Edberg; Henri Leconte	6; 4	6; 4	8; 10	3; 6	6; 4
3	(Sweden) (France)	Anders Järryd / Mats Wilander; Guy Forget / Henri Leconte	6; 4	7; 9	2; 6	2; 6
4	(Sweden) (France)	Mats Wilander; Henri Leconte	6; 1	6; 1	7; 5
5	(Sweden) (France)	Kent Carlsson; Thierry Tulasne	4; 6	6; 3	6; 3

=== West Germany vs. Yugoslavia ===
West Germany
5
Dortmund, West Germany
22–24 July 1988
Carpet (indoors)

Yugoslavia
0

			1	2	3	4	5
1	(West Germany) (Socialist Federal Republic of Yugoslavia)	Boris Becker; Slobodan Živojinović	7; 5	6; 2	6; 4
2	(West Germany) (Socialist Federal Republic of Yugoslavia)	Eric Jelen; Goran Prpić	9; 7	9; 7	6; 2
3	(West Germany) (Socialist Federal Republic of Yugoslavia)	Boris Becker / Eric Jelen; Goran Ivanišević / Slobodan Živojinović	5; 7	4; 6	6; 1	11; 9	9; 7
4	(West Germany) (Socialist Federal Republic of Yugoslavia)	Boris Becker; Goran Prpić	7; 5	6; 4
5	(West Germany) (Socialist Federal Republic of Yugoslavia)	Eric Jelen; Slobodan Živojinović	6; 4	6; 2

== Final ==
=== Sweden vs. West Germany ===
Sweden
1
Scandinavium, Gothenburg, Sweden
16–18 December 1988
Clay (indoors)

West Germany
4

			1	2	3	4	5
1	(Sweden) (West Germany)	Mats Wilander; Carl-Uwe Steeb	10; 8	6; 1	2; 6	4; 6	6; 8
2	(Sweden) (West Germany)	Stefan Edberg; Boris Becker	3; 6	1; 6	4; 6
3	(Sweden) (West Germany)	Stefan Edberg / Anders Järryd; Boris Becker / Eric Jelen	6; 3	6; 2	5; 7	3; 6	2; 6
4	(Sweden) (West Germany)	Stefan Edberg; Carl-Uwe Steeb	6; 4	8; 6
5	(Sweden) (West Germany)	Kent Carlsson; Patrik Kühnen						w/o

== Relegation play-offs ==
The first-round losers played in the Relegation Play-offs. The winners of the play-offs advanced to the 1989 Davis Cup World Group, and the losers were relegated to their respective Zonal Group I.

=== Results summary ===
Date: 8–10 April

Home team	Score	Visiting team	Location	Door	Surface	Ref.
Paraguay	4–1	New Zealand	Asunción	Outdoor	Clay	
Switzerland	2–3	Mexico	St. Gallen	Indoor	Carpet	
Spain	5–0	Brazil	Murcia	Outdoor	Clay	
Israel	w/o	India	—	—	—	

- Israel, Mexico, Paraguay and Spain remain in the World Group in 1989.
- Brazil, India, New Zealand and Switzerland are relegated to Zonal competition in 1989.

=== Paraguay vs. New Zealand ===
Paraguay
4
Asunción, Paraguay
8–10 April 1988
Clay

New Zealand
1

			1	2	3	4	5
1	(Paraguay) (New Zealand)	Víctor Pecci; Kelly Evernden	6; 4	8; 6	6; 8	6; 3
2	(Paraguay) (New Zealand)	Hugo Chapacú; Bruce Derlin	6; 0	6; 2	6; 3
3	(Paraguay) (New Zealand)	Francisco González / Víctor Pecci; Kelly Evernden / David Lewis	6; 3	6; 4	6; 3
4	(Paraguay) (New Zealand)	Francisco González; Bruce Derlin	6; 3	2; 6	4; 6
5	(Paraguay) (New Zealand)	Hugo Chapacú; Kelly Evernden	6; 2	6; 1

=== Switzerland vs. Mexico ===
Switzerland
2
Sportanlage Kreuzbleiche, St. Gallen, Switzerland
8–10 April 1988
Carpet (indoors)

Mexico
3

			1	2	3	4	5
1	(Switzerland) (Mexico)	Roland Stadler; Leonardo Lavalle	10; 8	6; 2	6; 4
2	(Switzerland) (Mexico)	Claudio Mezzadri; Jorge Lozano	6; 0	11; 9	6; 2
3	(Switzerland) (Mexico)	Heinz Günthardt / Claudio Mezzadri; Leonardo Lavalle / Jorge Lozano	6; 4	1; 6	7; 9	6; 3	4; 6
4	(Switzerland) (Mexico)	Roland Stadler; Jorge Lozano	6; 4	6; 3	4; 6	4; 6	2; 6
5	(Switzerland) (Mexico)	Claudio Mezzadri; Leonardo Lavalle	3; 6	6; 2	7; 5	4; 6	3; 6

=== Spain vs. Brazil ===
Spain
5
Murcia Club de Tenis, Murcia, Spain
8–10 April 1988
Clay

Brazil
0

			1	2	3	4	5
1	(Spain) (Brazil)	Javier Sánchez; Ivan Kley	6; 4	10; 8	5; 7	6; 2
2	(Spain) (Brazil)	Emilio Sánchez; Luiz Mattar	5; 7	6; 3	3; 6	6; 4	6; 4
3	(Spain) (Brazil)	Sergio Casal / Emilio Sánchez; Ricardo Acioly / Ivan Kley	6; 3	6; 3	6; 4
4	(Spain) (Brazil)	Javier Sánchez; Cássio Motta	10; 12	6; 3	6; 4
5	(Spain) (Brazil)	Emilio Sánchez; Ivan Kley	6; 2	9; 7
