= 1987 Davis Cup World Group =

- Date: 13 March – 20 December
- Edition: 7th

Champions
- Sweden
- Davis Cup

The World Group was the highest level of Davis Cup competition in 1987.

Australia were the defending champions, but were eliminated in the semifinals.

Sweden won the title, defeating India in the final, 5–0. The final was held at the Scandinavium in Gothenburg, Sweden, from 18 to 20 December. It was the Swedish team's 4th Davis Cup title overall.

== Participating teams ==
Participating teams
Argentina	Australia	Czechoslovakia	France
Great Britain	India	Israel	Italy
Mexico	Paraguay	South Korea	Spain
Sweden	United States	West Germany	Yugoslavia

=== Draw ===
First round 13–15 March
Prato, Italy (clay)
Sweden	3
Italy	2
Marcq-en-Barœul, France (indoor carpet)
France	5
South Korea	0
Asunción, Paraguay (clay)
United States	2
Paraguay	3
Barcelona, Spain (clay)
West Germany	2
Spain	3
New Delhi, India (grass)
India	3
Argentina	2
Hradec Králové, Czechoslovakia (indoor carpet)
Israel	3
Czechoslovakia	2
Mexico City, Mexico (clay)
Great Britain	0
Mexico	5
Adelaide, Australia (grass)
Yugoslavia	1
Australia	4

Quarterfinals; 24–26 July
Fréjus, France (clay)
Sweden	4
France	1
Caracas, Venezuela (clay)
Paraguay	2
Spain	3
New Delhi, India (grass)
India	4
Israel	0
Brisbane, Australia (grass)
Mexico	1
Australia	4

Semifinals; 2–4 October
Barcelona, Spain (clay)
Sweden	3
Spain	2
Sydney, Australia (grass)
India	3
Australia	2

Final; 18–20 December
Gothenburg, Sweden (indoor clay)
Sweden	5
India	0

== First round ==
=== Italy vs. Sweden ===
Italy
2
Tennis Club Prato, Prato, Italy
13–15 March 1987
Clay

Sweden
3

			1	2	3	4	5
1	(Italy) (Sweden)	Paolo Canè; Mikael Pernfors	1; 6	6; 2	6; 3	6; 4
2	(Italy) (Sweden)	Simone Colombo; Mats Wilander	2; 6	3; 6	0; 6
3	(Italy) (Sweden)	Paolo Canè / Simone Colombo; Anders Järryd / Mats Wilander	1; 6	2; 6	2; 6
4	(Italy) (Sweden)	Simone Colombo; Anders Järryd	3; 6	4; 6	6; 4	5; 7
5	(Italy) (Sweden)	Paolo Canè; Mats Wilander	6; 3	2; 6	7; 5

=== France vs. South Korea ===
France
5
Salle de Sport, Marcq-en-Barœul, France
13–15 March 1987
Carpet (indoors)

South Korea
0

			1	2	3	4	5
1	(France) (South Korea)	Thierry Tulasne; Kim Bong-soo	6; 4	6; 2	6; 3
2	(France) (South Korea)	Guy Forget; Yoo Jin-sun	6; 3	5; 7	6; 3	6; 3
3	(France) (South Korea)	Tarik Benhabiles / Guy Forget; Song Dong-wook / Yoo Jin-sun	4; 6	4; 6	6; 2	6; 3	10; 8
4	(France) (South Korea)	Tarik Benhabiles; Yoo Jin-sun	6; 3	4; 6	6; 3
5	(France) (South Korea)	Guy Forget; Kim Bong-soo	6; 4	7; 5

=== Paraguay vs. United States ===
Paraguay
3
Yacht y Golf Club Paraguayo, Asunción, Paraguay
13–15 March 1987
Clay

United States
2

			1	2	3	4	5
1	(Paraguay) (United States)	Hugo Chapacú; Aaron Krickstein	7; 5	3; 6	1; 6	6; 4	4; 6
2	(Paraguay) (United States)	Víctor Pecci; Jimmy Arias	6; 3	4; 6	6; 4	7; 5
3	(Paraguay) (United States)	Francisco González / Víctor Pecci; Ken Flach / Robert Seguso	7; 5	11; 9	2; 6	5; 7	4; 6
4	(Paraguay) (United States)	Hugo Chapacú; Jimmy Arias	6; 4	6; 1	5; 7	3; 6	9; 7
5	(Paraguay) (United States)	Víctor Pecci; Aaron Krickstein	6; 2	8; 6	9; 7

=== Spain vs. West Germany ===
Spain
3
Real Club de Tenis Barcelona, Barcelona, Spain
13–15 March 1987
Clay

West Germany
2

			1	2	3	4	5
1	(Spain) (West Germany)	Emilio Sánchez; Boris Becker	4; 6	5; 7	7; 5	6; 3	3; 6
2	(Spain) (West Germany)	Sergio Casal; Eric Jelen	6; 4	6; 8	7; 9	6; 3	6; 4
3	(Spain) (West Germany)	Sergio Casal / Emilio Sánchez; Boris Becker / Eric Jelen	5; 7	6; 4	4; 6	3; 6
4	(Spain) (West Germany)	Emilio Sánchez; Eric Jelen	8; 6	6; 3	6; 2
5	(Spain) (West Germany)	Sergio Casal; Boris Becker	6; 2	0; 6	6; 2	6; 3

=== India vs. Argentina ===
India
3
New Delhi, India
13–15 March 1987
Grass

Argentina
2

			1	2	3	4	5
1	(India) (Argentina)	Vijay Amritraj; Horacio de la Peña	9; 7	6; 3	6; 3
2	(India) (Argentina)	Ramesh Krishnan; Martín Jaite	6; 1	6; 3	3; 6	2; 6	3; 6
3	(India) (Argentina)	Anand Amritraj / Vijay Amritraj; Javier Frana / Christian Miniussi	3; 6	4; 6	6; 3	6; 8
4	(India) (Argentina)	Vijay Amritraj; Martín Jaite	3; 6	3; 6	6; 4	8; 6	6; 2
5	(India) (Argentina)	Ramesh Krishnan; Horacio de la Peña	6; 4	7; 5	6; 2

=== Czechoslovakia vs. Israel ===
Czechoslovakia
2
Hradec Králové, Czechoslovakia
13–15 March 1987
Carpet (indoors)

Israel
3

			1	2	3	4	5
1	(Czechoslovakia) (Israel)	Miloslav Mečíř; Amos Mansdorf	4; 6	2; 6	6; 3	3; 6
2	(Czechoslovakia) (Israel)	Milan Šrejber; Shlomo Glickstein	5; 7	4; 6	6; 3	6; 4	2; 3	retired
3	(Czechoslovakia) (Israel)	Miloslav Mečíř / Tomáš Šmíd; Shlomo Glickstein / Amos Mansdorf	6; 2	4; 6	8; 6	8; 6
4	(Czechoslovakia) (Israel)	Miloslav Mečíř; Shlomo Glickstein	6; 3	6; 1	6; 2
5	(Czechoslovakia) (Israel)	Karel Nováček; Amos Mansdorf	3; 6	6; 4	2; 6	0; 6

=== Mexico vs. Great Britain ===
Mexico
5
Estadio Federico Boehm, Mexico City, Mexico
13–15 March 1987
Clay

Great Britain
0

			1	2	3	4	5
1	(Mexico) (United Kingdom)	Francisco Maciel; Jeremy Bates	6; 3	6; 2	6; 5
2	(Mexico) (United Kingdom)	Leonardo Lavalle; Andrew Castle	6; 2	3; 6	6; 2	6; 4
3	(Mexico) (United Kingdom)	Leonardo Lavalle / Jorge Lozano; Jeremy Bates / Andrew Castle	6; 3	6; 2	6; 8	6; 2
4	(Mexico) (United Kingdom)	Agustín Moreno; Andrew Castle	9; 7	6; 1
5	(Mexico) (United Kingdom)	Jorge Lozano; Jeremy Bates	6; 4	6; 3

=== Australia vs. Yugoslavia ===
Australia
4
Memorial Drive Park, Adelaide, Australia
13–15 March 1987
Grass

Yugoslavia
1

			1	2	3	4	5
1	(Australia) (Socialist Federal Republic of Yugoslavia)	Pat Cash; Bruno Orešar	9; 7	6; 4	7; 5
2	(Australia) (Socialist Federal Republic of Yugoslavia)	Wally Masur; Slobodan Živojinović	8; 6	6; 8	7; 9	10; 12
3	(Australia) (Socialist Federal Republic of Yugoslavia)	Pat Cash / Peter Doohan; Igor Flego / Slobodan Živojinović	9; 11	7; 5	6; 3	6; 4
4	(Australia) (Socialist Federal Republic of Yugoslavia)	Wally Masur; Bruno Orešar	8; 6	6; 2	6; 1
5	(Australia) (Socialist Federal Republic of Yugoslavia)	Pat Cash; Slobodan Živojinović	6; 8	7; 5	6; 0

== Quarterfinals ==
=== France vs. Sweden ===
France
1
Arènes de Fréjus, Fréjus, France
24–26 July 1987
Clay

Sweden
4

			1	2	3	4	5
1	(France) (Sweden)	Thierry Tulasne; Kent Carlsson	1; 6	6; 3	1; 6	2; 6
2	(France) (Sweden)	Henri Leconte; Mats Wilander	3; 6	4; 6	2; 6
3	(France) (Sweden)	Guy Forget / Henri Leconte; Stefan Edberg / Anders Järryd	6; 4	6; 2	3; 6	15; 13
4	(France) (Sweden)	Henri Leconte; Kent Carlsson	5; 7	2; 6	5; 7
5	(France) (Sweden)	Thierry Tulasne; Mats Wilander	4; 6	3; 6

=== Paraguay vs. Spain ===
Paraguay
2
Caracas, Venezuela
24–26 July 1987
Clay

Spain
3

			1	2	3	4	5
1	(Paraguay) (Spain)	Víctor Pecci; Emilio Sánchez	1; 6	4; 6	9; 11
2	(Paraguay) (Spain)	Hugo Chapacú; Sergio Casal	2; 6	7; 5	6; 1	6; 3
3	(Paraguay) (Spain)	Francisco González / Víctor Pecci; Sergio Casal / Emilio Sánchez	2; 6	18; 16	3; 6	12; 14
4	(Paraguay) (Spain)	Víctor Pecci; Sergio Casal	2; 6	6; 3	6; 2	6; 2
5	(Paraguay) (Spain)	Hugo Chapacú; Emilio Sánchez	1; 6	3; 6	0; 6

=== India vs. Israel ===
India
4
New Delhi, India
24–26 July 1987
Grass

Israel
0

			1	2	3	4	5
1	(India) (Israel)	Ramesh Krishnan; Shlomo Glickstein	7; 5	6; 1	6; 2
2	(India) (Israel)	Vijay Amritraj; Amos Mansdorf	6; 4	6; 4	7; 5
3	(India) (Israel)	Anand Amritraj / Vijay Amritraj; Gilad Bloom / Shlomo Glickstein	6; 2	6; 2	7; 5
4	(India) (Israel)	Ramesh Krishnan; Amos Mansdorf	10; 8	6; 0
5	(India) (Israel)	Srinivasan Vasudevan; Shlomo Glickstein	10; 8					not completed

=== Australia vs. Mexico ===
Australia
4
Milton Courts, Brisbane, Australia
24–26 July 1987
Grass

Mexico
1

			1	2	3	4	5
1	(Australia) (Mexico)	Wally Masur; Jorge Lozano	6; 3	6; 4	6; 4
2	(Australia) (Mexico)	Pat Cash; Leonardo Lavalle	6; 2	6; 1	6; 0
3	(Australia) (Mexico)	Peter Doohan / Wally Masur; Leonardo Lavalle / Jorge Lozano	3; 6	6; 4	4; 6	8; 6	13; 11
4	(Australia) (Mexico)	Pat Cash; Jorge Lozano	6; 3	6; 4
5	(Australia) (Mexico)	Wally Masur; Leonardo Lavalle	5; 7	4; 6

== Semifinals ==
=== Spain vs. Sweden ===
Spain
2
Real Club de Tenis Barcelona, Barcelona, Spain
2–5 October 1987
Clay

Sweden
3

			1	2	3	4	5
1	(Spain) (Sweden)	Emilio Sánchez; Mats Wilander	6; 8	6; 3	0; 6	2; 6
2	(Spain) (Sweden)	Javier Sánchez; Stefan Edberg	4; 6	2; 6	4; 6
3	(Spain) (Sweden)	Sergio Casal / Emilio Sánchez; Anders Järryd / Mats Wilander	6; 0	6; 3	2; 6	6; 4
4	(Spain) (Sweden)	Emilio Sánchez; Stefan Edberg	4; 6	6; 8	4; 6
5	(Spain) (Sweden)	Javier Sánchez; Jan Gunnarsson	6; 3	3; 6	6; 3

=== Australia vs. India ===
Australia
2
White City Stadium, Sydney, Australia
2–4 October 1987
Grass

India
3

			1	2	3	4	5
1	(Australia) (India)	John Fitzgerald; Ramesh Krishnan	1; 6	2; 6	6; 3	6; 8
2	(Australia) (India)	Wally Masur; Vijay Amritraj	6; 1	3; 6	10; 12	4; 6
3	(Australia) (India)	Pat Cash / Peter Doohan; Anand Amritraj / Srinivasan Vasudevan	6; 3	6; 4	6; 4
4	(Australia) (India)	John Fitzgerald; Vijay Amritraj	7; 5	6; 3	6; 3
5	(Australia) (India)	Wally Masur; Ramesh Krishnan	6; 8	4; 6	4; 6

== Final ==
=== Sweden vs. India ===
Sweden
5
Scandinavium, Gothenburg, Sweden
18–20 December 1987
Clay (indoors)

India
0

			1	2	3	4	5
1	(Sweden) (India)	Mats Wilander; Ramesh Krishnan	6; 4	6; 1	6; 3
2	(Sweden) (India)	Anders Järryd; Vijay Amritraj	6; 3	6; 3	6; 1
3	(Sweden) (India)	Joakim Nyström / Mats Wilander; Anand Amritraj / Vijay Amritraj	6; 2	3; 6	6; 1	6; 2
4	(Sweden) (India)	Anders Järryd; Ramesh Krishnan	6; 4	6; 3
5	(Sweden) (India)	Mats Wilander; Vijay Amritraj	6; 2	6; 0

== Relegation play-offs ==
The first-round losers played in the Relegation Play-offs. The winners of the play-offs advanced to the 1988 Davis Cup World Group, and the losers were relegated to their respective Zonal Regions.

=== Results summary ===
Date: 24–26 July

Home team	Score	Visiting team	Location	Door	Surface	Ref.
South Korea	2–3	Italy	Seoul	Outdoor	Hard	
United States	2–3	West Germany	Hartford, CT	Indoor	Carpet	
Czechoslovakia	5–0	Argentina	Prague	Outdoor	Clay	
Yugoslavia	3–0	Great Britain	Zagreb	Outdoor	Clay	

- Czechoslovakia, Italy, West Germany and Yugoslavia remain in the World Group in 1988.
- Argentina, Great Britain, South Korea and United States are relegated to Zonal competition in 1988.

=== South Korea vs. Italy ===
South Korea
2
Seoul, South Korea
24–26 July 1987
Hard

Italy
3

			1	2	3	4	5
1	(South Korea) (Italy)	Song Dong-wook; Paolo Canè	10; 8	3; 6	6; 4	6; 4
2	(South Korea) (Italy)	Yoo Jin-sun; Claudio Panatta	6; 2	4; 6	4; 6	9; 7	10; 12
3	(South Korea) (Italy)	Song Dong-wook / Yoo Jin-sun; Paolo Canè / Simone Colombo	2; 6	4; 6	4; 6
4	(South Korea) (Italy)	Song Dong-wook; Claudio Panatta	6; 1	6; 8	3; 6	6; 2	6; 2
5	(South Korea) (Italy)	Kim Bong-soo; Paolo Canè	3; 6	1; 6	6; 8

=== United States vs. West Germany ===
United States
2
Hartford Civic Center, Hartford, CT, United States
24–26 July 1987
Carpet (indoors)

West Germany
3

			1	2	3	4	5
1	(United States) (West Germany)	Tim Mayotte; Eric Jelen	8; 6	2; 6	6; 1	3; 6	2; 6
2	(United States) (West Germany)	John McEnroe; Boris Becker	6; 4	13; 15	10; 8	2; 6	2; 6
3	(United States) (West Germany)	Ken Flach / Robert Seguso; Eric Jelen / Ricki Osterthun	6; 3	8; 6	14; 12
4	(United States) (West Germany)	John McEnroe; Eric Jelen	7; 5	6; 2	6; 1
5	(United States) (West Germany)	Tim Mayotte; Boris Becker	2; 6	3; 6	7; 5	6; 4	2; 6

=== Czechoslovakia vs. Argentina ===
Czechoslovakia
5
Prague, Czechoslovakia
24–26 July 1987
Clay

Argentina
0

			1	2	3	4	5
1	(Czechoslovakia) (Argentina)	Karel Nováček; Martín Jaite	6; 3	2; 6	6; 3	6; 1
2	(Czechoslovakia) (Argentina)	Miloslav Mečíř; Horacio de la Peña	8; 6	4; 6	6; 3	6; 4
3	(Czechoslovakia) (Argentina)	Miloslav Mečíř / Tomáš Šmíd; Javier Frana / Christian Miniussi	6; 1	4; 6	6; 3	6; 2
4	(Czechoslovakia) (Argentina)	Karel Nováček; Horacio de la Peña	6; 4	7; 5
5	(Czechoslovakia) (Argentina)	Miloslav Mečíř; Martín Jaite	9; 7	6; 2

=== Yugoslavia vs. Great Britain ===
Yugoslavia
3
Tenis klub Medveščak, Zagreb, Yugoslavia
24–26 July 1987
Clay

Great Britain
0

			1	2	3	4	5
1	(Socialist Federal Republic of Yugoslavia) (United Kingdom)	Bruno Orešar; Jeremy Bates	6; 1	6; 0	1; 6	6; 3
2	(Socialist Federal Republic of Yugoslavia) (United Kingdom)	Slobodan Živojinović; Steve Shaw	6; 3	6; 4	6; 4
3	(Socialist Federal Republic of Yugoslavia) (United Kingdom)	Bruno Orešar / Slobodan Živojinović; Jeremy Bates / Andrew Castle	10; 8	11; 9	12; 10
4	(Socialist Federal Republic of Yugoslavia) (United Kingdom)	Slobodan Živojinović; Jeremy Bates	4; 6	6; 3	4; 0			not completed
5	(Socialist Federal Republic of Yugoslavia) (United Kingdom)	Bruno Orešar; Steve Shaw						not played
