= 1989 Davis Cup World Group =

- Date: 3 February – 17 December
- Edition: 9th

Champions
- West Germany
- Davis Cup

The World Group was the highest level of Davis Cup competition in 1989. The first-round losers went into the Davis Cup World Group qualifying round, and the winners progressed to the quarterfinals and were guaranteed a World Group spot for 1990.

West Germany won the title for a second consecutive year, defeating Sweden in the final, 3–2. The final was held at the Schleyer-Halle in Stuttgart, West Germany, on 15–17 December. It was the West Germany team's 2nd Davis Cup title overall.

== Participating teams ==
Participating teams
Australia	Austria	Czechoslovakia	Denmark
France	Indonesia	Israel	Italy
Mexico	Paraguay	Soviet Union	Spain
Sweden	United States	West Germany	Yugoslavia

== Draw ==
First round 3–5 February
Malmö, Sweden (indoor carpet)
Sweden	4
Italy	1
Vienna, Austria (indoor clay)
Australia	0
Austria	5
Belgrade, Yugoslavia (indoor clay)
Yugoslavia	4
Denmark	1
Marbella, Spain (clay)
Spain	3
Mexico	2
Fort Myers, FL, United States (hard)
Paraguay	0
United States	5
Tel Aviv, Israel (indoor carpet)
Israel	1
France	4
Prague, Czechoslovakia (indoor carpet)
Soviet Union	1
Czechoslovakia	4
Karlsruhe, West Germany (indoor carpet)
Indonesia	0
West Germany	5

Quarterfinals; 7–9 April
Vienna, Austria (indoor clay)
Sweden	3
Austria	2
Split, Yugoslavia (indoor carpet)
Yugoslavia	4
Spain	1
San Diego, CA, United States (indoor carpet)
United States	5
France	0
Prague, Czechoslovakia (indoor carpet)
Czechoslovakia	2
West Germany	3

Semifinals; 21–23 July
Båstad, Sweden (clay)
Sweden	4
Yugoslavia	1
Munich, West Germany (indoor carpet)
United States	2
West Germany	3

Final; 15–17 December
Stuttgart, West Germany (indoor carpet)
Sweden	2
West Germany	3

== First round ==
=== Sweden vs. Italy ===
Sweden
4
Baltiska Hallen, Malmö, Sweden
3–5 February 1989
Carpet (indoors)

Italy
1

			1	2	3	4	5
1	(Sweden) (Italy)	Jonas Svensson; Massimiliano Narducci	4; 6	6; 3	6; 1	4; 6	6; 3
2	(Sweden) (Italy)	Mikael Pernfors; Omar Camporese	5; 7	3; 6	2; 6
3	(Sweden) (Italy)	Jan Gunnarsson / Anders Järryd; Omar Camporese / Diego Nargiso	7^{8} 6^{6}	7; 5	6; 4
4	(Sweden) (Italy)	Mikael Pernfors; Massimiliano Narducci	6; 3	6; 4	4; 6	6^{2} 7^{7}	6; 3
5	(Sweden) (Italy)	Jonas Svensson; Omar Camporese	6; 3	3; 6	6; 3

=== Austria vs. Australia ===
Austria
5
Ferry-Dusika-Hallenstadion, Vienna, Austria
3–5 February 1989
Clay (indoors)

Australia
0

			1	2	3	4	5
1	(Austria) (Australia)	Horst Skoff; Pat Cash	7^{7} 6^{1}	7; 5	6; 3
2	(Austria) (Australia)	Thomas Muster; Mark Woodforde	6; 4	6^{4} 7^{7}	6; 2	6; 3
3	(Austria) (Australia)	Alex Antonitsch / Thomas Muster; Pat Cash / John Fitzgerald	6; 3	7^{7} 6^{4}	3; 6	3; 6	6; 2
4	(Austria) (Australia)	Horst Skoff; Mark Woodforde	2; 6	6; 4	6; 2
5	(Austria) (Australia)	Thomas Muster; Pat Cash	6; 2	6; 0

=== Yugoslavia vs. Denmark ===
Yugoslavia
4
Pionir Hall, Belgrade, SFR Yugoslavia
3–5 February 1989
Clay (indoors)

Denmark
1

			1	2	3	4	5
1	(Socialist Federal Republic of Yugoslavia) (Denmark)	Slobodan Živojinović; Morten Christensen	6; 3	7^{7} 6^{5}	5; 7	6; 3
2	(Socialist Federal Republic of Yugoslavia) (Denmark)	Bruno Orešar; Frederik Fetterlein	1; 6	7; 5	6; 1	6; 0
3	(Socialist Federal Republic of Yugoslavia) (Denmark)	Goran Ivanišević / Slobodan Živojinović; Morten Christensen / Michael Mortensen	6; 3	6; 2	7^{7} 6^{5}
4	(Socialist Federal Republic of Yugoslavia) (Denmark)	Goran Ivanišević; Frederik Fetterlein	6; 0	3; 6	9; 11
5	(Socialist Federal Republic of Yugoslavia) (Denmark)	Bruno Orešar; Thomas Sørensen	6; 2	6; 3

=== Spain vs. Mexico ===
Spain
3
Hotel Puente Romano, Marbella, Spain
3–5 February 1989
Clay

Mexico
2

			1	2	3	4	5
1	(Spain) (Mexico)	Jordi Arrese; Leonardo Lavalle	2; 6	4; 6	2; 6
2	(Spain) (Mexico)	Emilio Sánchez; Francisco Maciel	4; 6	6; 4	6; 0	7; 5
3	(Spain) (Mexico)	Sergio Casal / Emilio Sánchez; Leonardo Lavalle / Jorge Lozano	4; 6	6; 3	2; 6	6; 2	6; 1
4	(Spain) (Mexico)	Emilio Sánchez; Leonardo Lavalle	4; 6	2; 6	6; 3	5; 7
5	(Spain) (Mexico)	Jordi Arrese; Francisco Maciel	6; 3	6; 3	6; 4

=== United States vs. Paraguay ===
United States
5
Sonesta Sanibel Harbor Resort, Fort Myers, FL, United States
3–5 February 1989
Hard

Paraguay
0

			1	2	3	4	5
1	(United States) (Paraguay)	Michael Chang; Víctor Pecci	6^{5} 7^{7}	6; 3	6; 4	6; 2
2	(United States) (Paraguay)	Andre Agassi; Hugo Chapacú	6; 2	6; 1	6; 1
3	(United States) (Paraguay)	Ken Flach / Robert Seguso; Francisco González / Víctor Pecci	6; 1	6; 3	6; 4
4	(United States) (Paraguay)	Michael Chang; Hugo Chapacú	5; 7	6; 0	6; 1
5	(United States) (Paraguay)	Andre Agassi; Francisco González	6; 2	6; 4

=== Israel vs. France ===
Israel
1
Sports Palace, Tel Aviv, Israel
3–5 February 1989
Carpet (indoors)

France
4

			1	2	3	4	5
1	(Israel) (France)	Gilad Bloom; Yannick Noah	6^{3} 7^{7}	6; 4	3; 6	3; 6
2	(Israel) (France)	Amos Mansdorf; Henri Leconte	6; 3	6; 4	2; 6	4; 6	4; 6
3	(Israel) (France)	Amos Mansdorf / Shahar Perkiss; Guy Forget / Yannick Noah	3; 6	7^{7} 6^{4}	6; 3	3; 6	11; 13
4	(Israel) (France)	Amos Mansdorf; Yannick Noah	7^{10} 6^{8}	3; 6	6; 3
5	(Israel) (France)	Gilad Bloom; Henri Leconte	3; 6	6; 2	4; 6

=== Czechoslovakia vs. Soviet Union ===
Czechoslovakia
4
Sportovní hala, Prague, Czechoslovakia
3–5 February 1989
Carpet (indoors)

Soviet Union
1

			1	2	3	4	5
1	(Czechoslovakia) (Soviet Union)	Milan Šrejber; Alexander Volkov	3; 6	6; 2	6; 1	7^{7} 6^{4}
2	(Czechoslovakia) (Soviet Union)	Miloslav Mečíř; Andrey Cherkasov	7; 5	6; 3	3; 6	4; 6	6; 4
3	(Czechoslovakia) (Soviet Union)	Petr Korda / Tomáš Šmíd; Andrei Olhovskiy / Alexander Volkov	6; 3	6; 4	6; 4
4	(Czechoslovakia) (Soviet Union)	Miloslav Mečíř; Alexander Volkov	2; 6	7^{7} 6^{5}	0; 6
5	(Czechoslovakia) (Soviet Union)	Milan Šrejber; Andrey Cherkasov	6^{4} 7^{7}	7; 5	6; 4

=== West Germany vs. Indonesia ===
West Germany
5
Europahalle, Karlsruhe, West Germany
3–5 February 1989
Carpet (indoors)

Indonesia
0

			1	2	3	4	5
1	(West Germany) (Indonesia)	Boris Becker; Abdul Kahar Mim	6; 0	6; 1	6; 1
2	(West Germany) (Indonesia)	Carl-Uwe Steeb; Tintus Arianto Wibowo	6; 1	6; 2	6; 3
3	(West Germany) (Indonesia)	Boris Becker / Eric Jelen; Hary Suharyadi / Donald Wailan-Walalangi	6; 2	6; 4	6; 1
4	(West Germany) (Indonesia)	Carl-Uwe Steeb; Abdul Kahar Mim	6; 2	6; 2
5	(West Germany) (Indonesia)	Boris Becker; Tintus Arianto Wibowo	6; 2	7; 5

== Quarterfinals ==
=== Austria vs. Sweden ===
Austria
2
Ferry-Dusika-Hallenstadion, Vienna, Austria
7–9 April 1989
Clay (indoors)

Sweden
3

			1	2	3	4	5
1	(Austria) (Sweden)	Alex Antonitsch; Stefan Edberg	3; 6	2; 6	4; 6
2	(Austria) (Sweden)	Horst Skoff; Mats Wilander	6^{5} 7^{7}	7^{9} 6^{7}	1; 6	6; 4	9; 7
3	(Austria) (Sweden)	Alex Antonitsch / Horst Skoff; Stefan Edberg / Anders Järryd	3; 6	1; 6	3; 6
4	(Austria) (Sweden)	Horst Skoff; Stefan Edberg	3; 6	2; 6	1; 6
5	(Austria) (Sweden)	Alex Antonitsch; Mats Wilander	6; 3	7; 5

=== Yugoslavia vs. Spain ===
Yugoslavia
4
Športski centar Gripe, Split, SFR Yugoslavia
7–9 April 1989
Carpet (indoors)

Spain
1

			1	2	3	4	5
1	(Socialist Federal Republic of Yugoslavia) (Spain)	Goran Ivanišević; Sergio Casal	6; 3	2; 6	7; 5	6; 3
2	(Socialist Federal Republic of Yugoslavia) (Spain)	Slobodan Živojinović; Emilio Sánchez	6; 4	6; 3	7^{7} 6^{5}
3	(Socialist Federal Republic of Yugoslavia) (Spain)	Goran Ivanišević / Slobodan Živojinović; Sergio Casal / Emilio Sánchez	4; 6	6; 4	4; 6	7^{7} 6^{5}	13; 11
4	(Socialist Federal Republic of Yugoslavia) (Spain)	Slobodan Živojinović; Sergio Casal	6^{5} 7^{7}	6; 1	3; 6
5	(Socialist Federal Republic of Yugoslavia) (Spain)	Goran Ivanišević; Javier Sánchez	7; 5	6; 1

=== United States vs. France ===
United States
5
San Diego Sports Arena, San Diego, CA, United States
7–9 April 1989
Carpet (indoors)

France
0

			1	2	3	4	5
1	(United States) (France)	John McEnroe; Yannick Noah	6; 3	6; 4	6; 1
2	(United States) (France)	Andre Agassi; Henri Leconte	6; 1	6; 2	5; 7	6; 1
3	(United States) (France)	Ken Flach / Robert Seguso; Guy Forget / Yannick Noah	6; 2	7^{7} 6^{4}	4; 6	7^{7} 6^{3}
4	(United States) (France)	Andre Agassi; Yannick Noah	6; 3	7^{9} 6^{7}
5	(United States) (France)	John McEnroe; Henri Leconte	6; 3	6; 1

=== Czechoslovakia vs. West Germany ===
Czechoslovakia
2
Sportovní hala, Prague, Czechoslovakia
7–9 April 1989
Carpet (indoors)

West Germany
3

			1	2	3	4	5
1	(Czechoslovakia) (West Germany)	Karel Nováček; Boris Becker	6^{5} 7^{7}	4; 6	4; 6
2	(Czechoslovakia) (West Germany)	Milan Šrejber; Carl-Uwe Steeb	7; 5	6; 4	6; 3
3	(Czechoslovakia) (West Germany)	Petr Korda / Milan Šrejber; Boris Becker / Eric Jelen	6; 3	6^{2} 7^{7}	3; 6	7^{9} 6^{7}	6; 3
4	(Czechoslovakia) (West Germany)	Karel Nováček; Carl-Uwe Steeb	3; 6	4; 6	4; 6
5	(Czechoslovakia) (West Germany)	Milan Šrejber; Boris Becker	3; 6	4; 6	3; 6

== Semifinals ==
=== Sweden vs. Yugoslavia ===
Sweden
4
Båstad Tennis Stadium, Båstad, Sweden
21–23 July 1989
Clay

Yugoslavia
1

			1	2	3	4	5
1	(Sweden) (Socialist Federal Republic of Yugoslavia)	Jonas Svensson; Goran Ivanišević	6; 4	7^{9} 6^{7}	3; 6	6; 4
2	(Sweden) (Socialist Federal Republic of Yugoslavia)	Mats Wilander; Goran Prpić	7^{9} 6^{7}	6; 1	6; 0
3	(Sweden) (Socialist Federal Republic of Yugoslavia)	Stefan Edberg / Anders Järryd; Goran Ivanišević / Goran Prpić	6; 4	4; 6	4; 6	3; 6
4	(Sweden) (Socialist Federal Republic of Yugoslavia)	Jonas Svensson; Goran Prpić	6^{3} 7^{7}	6; 4	7^{9} 6^{7}	3; 6	6; 3
5	(Sweden) (Socialist Federal Republic of Yugoslavia)	Mats Wilander; Goran Ivanišević	6; 3	6; 3

=== West Germany vs. United States ===
West Germany
3
Olympiahalle, Munich, West Germany
21–23 July 1989
Carpet (indoors)

United States
2

			1	2	3	4	5
1	(West Germany) (United States)	Carl-Uwe Steeb; Brad Gilbert	2; 6	6; 2	6; 2	4; 6	4; 6
2	(West Germany) (United States)	Boris Becker; Andre Agassi	6^{4} 7^{7}	6^{5} 7^{7}	7^{7} 6^{4}	6; 3	6; 4
3	(West Germany) (United States)	Boris Becker / Eric Jelen; Ken Flach / Robert Seguso	3; 6	7^{7} 6^{5}	6; 4	7^{7} 6^{3}
4	(West Germany) (United States)	Carl-Uwe Steeb; Andre Agassi	4; 6	6; 4	6; 4	6; 2
5	(West Germany) (United States)	Patrik Kühnen; Brad Gilbert	4; 6	6; 1	4; 6

== Final ==
=== West Germany vs. Sweden ===
West Germany
3
Schleyer-Halle, Stuttgart, West Germany
15–17 December 1989
Carpet (indoors)

Sweden
2

			1	2	3	4	5
1	(West Germany) (Sweden)	Carl-Uwe Steeb; Mats Wilander	7; 5	6; 7	7^{7} 6^{4}	2; 6	3; 6
2	(West Germany) (Sweden)	Boris Becker; Stefan Edberg	6; 2	6; 2	6; 4
3	(West Germany) (Sweden)	Boris Becker / Eric Jelen; Jan Gunnarsson / Anders Järryd	7^{8} 6^{6}	6; 4	3; 6	6^{4} 7^{7}	6; 4
4	(West Germany) (Sweden)	Boris Becker; Mats Wilander	6; 2	6; 0	6; 2
5	(West Germany) (Sweden)	Carl-Uwe Steeb; Stefan Edberg	2; 6	4; 6
