= 1989 Davis Cup World Group qualifying round =

Davis world cup qualifiers

The 1989 Davis Cup World Group qualifying round was held from 20 to 24 July. They were the main play-offs of the 1989 Davis Cup. The winners of the playoffs advanced to the 1990 Davis Cup World Group, and the losers were relegated to their respective Zonal Regions I.

== Teams ==
Bold indicates team had qualified for the 1990 Davis Cup World Group.

From World Group

- **Australia**
- Denmark
- Indonesia
- **Israel**
- **Italy**
- **Mexico**
- Paraguay
- Soviet Union

From Americas Group I

- **Argentina**
- Peru

From Asia/Oceania Group I

- **New Zealand**
- South Korea

From Europe/Africa Group I

- Great Britain
- Hungary
- **Netherlands**
- **Switzerland**

== Results summary ==
Date: 20–24 July

The eight losing teams in the World Group first round ties and eight winners of the Zonal Group I final round ties competed in the World Group qualifying round for spots in the 1990 World Group.

Home team	Score	Visiting team	Location	Venue	Door	Surface	Ref.
Great Britain	2–3	**Argentina**	Eastbourne	Devonshire Park Lawn Tennis Club	Outdoor	Grass	
Peru	2–3	**Australia**	Lima	Jockey Club del Perú	Outdoor	Clay	
Denmark	1–4	**Italy**	Aarhus	Aarhus Idrætspark	Indoor	Carpet	
**New Zealand**	4–1	Hungary	Auckland	Chase Stadium	Indoor	Carpet	
**Netherlands**	5–0	Indonesia	Best	Best Leisure Centre	Indoor	Carpet	
South Korea	1–4	**Israel**	Seoul	Seoul Olympic Park Tennis Center	Outdoor	Hard	
**Mexico**	4–1	Soviet Union	Mexico City	Club Alemán de México	Outdoor	Clay	
**Switzerland**	5–0	Paraguay	Langenthal	Dreilinden Tenniscenter	Outdoor	Clay	

- Australia, Israel, Italy and Mexico remain in the World Group in 1990.
- Argentina, Netherlands, New Zealand and Switzerland are promoted to the World Group in 1990.
- Great Britain, Hungary, Peru and South Korea remain in Zonal Group I in 1990.
- Denmark, Indonesia, Paraguay and Soviet Union are relegated to Zonal Group I in 1990.

== Qualifying results ==
=== Great Britain vs. Argentina ===
Great Britain
2
Devonshire Park Lawn Tennis Club, Eastbourne, United Kingdom
20–22 July 1989
Grass

Argentina
3

			1	2	3	4	5
1	(United Kingdom) (Argentina)	**Jeremy Bates**; Martín Jaite	**6**; 2	6^{2} **7^{7}**	**6**; 3	1; **6**	**7**; 5
2	(United Kingdom) (Argentina)	Chris Bailey; **Alberto Mancini**	5; **7**	**7^{7}** 6^{4}	6^{0} **7^{7}**	**7**; 5	4; **6**
3	(United Kingdom) (Argentina)	Nick Brown / Andrew Castle; **Javier Frana / Gustavo Luza**	6^{5} **7^{7}**	4; **6**	3; **6**
4	(United Kingdom) (Argentina)	Chris Bailey; **Martín Jaite**	6^{4} **7^{7}**	3; **6**	5; **7**
5	(United Kingdom) (Argentina)	**Jeremy Bates**; Alberto Mancini	5; 0					**retired**

=== Peru vs. Australia ===
Peru
2
Jockey Club del Perú, Lima, Peru
21–24 July 1989
Clay

Australia
3

			1	2	3	4	5
1	(Peru) (Australia)	**Jaime Yzaga**; Wally Masur	**6**; 4	2; **6**	**6**; 4	**6**; 2
2	(Peru) (Australia)	Pablo Arraya; **Darren Cahill**	5; **7**	1; **6**	0; **6**
3	(Peru) (Australia)	Carlos di Laura / Jaime Yzaga; **Darren Cahill / John Fitzgerald**	5; **7**	3; **6**	6^{3} **7^{7}**
4	(Peru) (Australia)	**Jaime Yzaga**; Jason Stoltenberg	1; **6**	**6**; 2	**6**; 1	1; **6**	**9**; 7
5	(Peru) (Australia)	Pablo Arraya; **Wally Masur**	4; **6**	4; **6**	**6**; 4	2; **6**

=== Denmark vs. Italy ===
Denmark
1
Aarhus Idrætspark, Aarhus, Denmark
21–23 July 1989
Carpet (indoors)

Italy
4

			1	2	3	4	5
1	(Denmark) (Italy)	Michael Tauson; **Diego Nargiso**	**6**; 4	4; **6**	1; **6**	3; **6**
2	(Denmark) (Italy)	Morten Christensen; **Omar Camporese**	**6**; 4	4; **6**	**6**; 3	2; **6**	6; **8**
3	(Denmark) (Italy)	Peter Flintsø / Michael Mortensen; **Omar Camporese / Diego Nargiso**	5; **7**	6^{3} **7^{7}**	4; **6**
4	(Denmark) (Italy)	Peter Flintsø; **Omar Camporese**	6^{2} **7^{7}**	1; **6**
5	(Denmark) (Italy)	**Morten Christensen**; Claudio Pistolesi	**6**; 4	**7**; 5

=== New Zealand vs. Hungary ===
New Zealand
4
Chase Stadium, Auckland, New Zealand
21–23 July 1989
Carpet (indoors)

Hungary
1

			1	2	3	4	5
1	(New Zealand) (Hungary)	**Kelly Evernden**; Sándor Noszály	**7**; 5	**6**; 1	**6**; 4
2	(New Zealand) (Hungary)	Steve Guy; **András Lányi**	5; **6**	**7**; 5	4; **6**	4; **6**
3	(New Zealand) (Hungary)	**Kelly Evernden / David Lewis**; Gábor Köves / László Markovits	**6**; 2	4; **6**	**6**; 2	**6**; 3
4	(New Zealand) (Hungary)	**Kelly Evernden**; András Lányi	**6**; 0	**7**; 5	**6**; 4
5	(New Zealand) (Hungary)	**Steve Guy**; Sándor Noszály	**7^{7}** 6^{0}	**6**; 4

=== Netherlands vs. Indonesia ===
Netherlands
5
Best Leisure Centre, Best, Netherlands
21–23 July 1989
Carpet (indoors)

Indonesia
0

			1	2	3	4	5
1	(Netherlands) (Indonesia)	**Tom Nijssen**; Tintus Arianto Wibowo	**7**; 5	**6**; 3	6^{5} **7^{7}**	**6**; 3
2	(Netherlands) (Indonesia)	**Michiel Schapers**; Hary Suharyadi	**7**; 5	**6**; 3	**6**; 2
3	(Netherlands) (Indonesia)	**Tom Nijssen / Michiel Schapers**; Hary Suharyadi / Donald Wailan-Walalangi	**6**; 2	**6**; 3	**6**; 4
4	(Netherlands) (Indonesia)	**Michiel Schapers**; Tintus Arianto Wibowo	**6**; 2	**6**; 3
5	(Netherlands) (Indonesia)	**Tom Nijssen**; Hary Suharyadi	**6**; 2	**6**; 0

=== South Korea vs. Israel ===
South Korea
1
Seoul Olympic Park Tennis Center, Seoul, South Korea
21–23 July 1989
Hard

Israel
4

			1	2	3	4	5
1	(South Korea) (Israel)	Song Dong-wook; **Gilad Bloom**	4; **6**	2; **6**	4; **6**
2	(South Korea) (Israel)	Kim Bong-soo; **Amos Mansdorf**	6^{3} **7^{7}**	3; **6**	0; **6**
3	(South Korea) (Israel)	Kim Jae-sik / Yoo Jin-sun; **Amos Mansdorf / Shahar Perkiss**	**6**; 4	**6**; 1	3; **6**	4; **6**	4; **6**
4	(South Korea) (Israel)	Song Dong-wook; **Amos Mansdorf**	5; **7**	3; **6**
5	(South Korea) (Israel)	**Kim Bong-soo**; Gilad Bloom	**7^{7}** 6^{3}	**6**; 4

=== Mexico vs. Soviet Union ===
Mexico
4
Club Alemán de México, Mexico City, Mexico
21–23 July 1989
Clay

Soviet Union
1

			1	2	3	4	5
1	(Mexico) (Soviet Union)	**Leonardo Lavalle**; Andrei Chesnokov	**7^{7}** 6^{5}	4; **6**	**6**; 3	**6**; 4
2	(Mexico) (Soviet Union)	**Jorge Lozano**; Andrei Cherkasov	**7^{7}** 6^{5}	4; **6**	**7^{7}** 6^{3}	**6**; 4
3	(Mexico) (Soviet Union)	**Leonardo Lavalle / Jorge Lozano**; Andrei Olhovskiy / Alexander Volkov	**7**; 5	**7^{7}** 6^{4}	6^{4} **7^{7}**	4; **6**	**6**; 2
4	(Mexico) (Soviet Union)	Agustín Moreno; **Andrei Cherkasov**	**7^{7}** 6^{5}	4; **6**	4; **6**
5	(Mexico) (Soviet Union)	**Jorge Lozano**; Andrei Chesnokov	**6**; 3	**6**; 0

=== Switzerland vs. Paraguay ===
Switzerland
5
Dreilinden Tenniscenter, Langenthal, Switzerland
21–23 July 1989
Clay

Paraguay
0

			1	2	3	4	5
1	(Switzerland) (Paraguay)	**Claudio Mezzadri**; Rubén Alvarenga	**6**; 2	**6**; 2	**6**; 1
2	(Switzerland) (Paraguay)	**Jakob Hlasek**; Hugo Chapacú	**7^{10}** 6^{8}	**6**; 1	**6**; 3
3	(Switzerland) (Paraguay)	**Heinz Günthardt / Jakob Hlasek**; Francisco González / Víctor Pecci	4; **6**	**6**; 1	**6**; 1	**6**; 3
4	(Switzerland) (Paraguay)	**Claudio Mezzadri**; Hugo Chapacú	**7^{7}** 6^{3}	**7**; 5
5	(Switzerland) (Paraguay)	**Jakob Hlasek**; Rubén Alvarenga	**6**; 2	**6**; 2
