= Hugo Chapacú =

Paraguayan tennis player

- Country (sports): Paraguay
- Born: May 5, 1962 (age 64) Posadas, Misiones, Argentina
- Height: 5 ft 10 in (178 cm)
- Plays: Right-handed
- Prize money: $11,911

Singles
- Career record: 6–14
- Highest ranking: No. 217 (October 19, 1987)

Doubles
- Career record: 0–3
- Highest ranking: No. 518 (August 1, 1988)

Hugo Chapacú (born May 5, 1962) is a former tennis player, who represented Paraguay at the 1988 Summer Olympics in Seoul. There he was defeated in the first round by qualifier Andrei Cherkasov from the Soviet Union. The right-hander reached his highest singles ATP-ranking on October 19, 1987, when he became the number 217 of the world.

He had an upset, where he beat Jimmy Arias in Davis Cup.
