= 1998 Davis Cup World Group =

- Date: 3 April – 6 December
- Edition: 18th

Champions
- Sweden
- Davis Cup

The World Group was the highest level of Davis Cup competition in 1998. The first-round losers went into the Davis Cup World Group qualifying round, and the winners progressed to the quarterfinals and were guaranteed a World Group spot for 1999.

Sweden were the defending champions and won their second consecutive title, defeating Italy in the final, 4–1. The final was held at the Forum di Assago in Milan, Italy, from 4 to 6 December. It was the Swedish team's 7th Davis Cup title overall.

== Participating teams ==
Participating teams
Australia	Belgium	Brazil	Czech Republic
Germany	India	Italy	Netherlands
Russia	Slovakia	South Africa	Spain
Sweden	Switzerland	United States	Zimbabwe

== Draw ==
First round 3–6 April
Bratislava, Slovakia (indoor clay)
Sweden	3
Slovakia	2
Bremen, Germany (indoor carpet)
Germany	5
South Africa	0
Porto Alegre, Brazil (clay)
Spain	3
Brazil	2
Zürich, Switzerland (indoor carpet)
Czech Republic	2
Switzerland	3
Genoa, Italy (clay)
India	1
Italy	4
Mildura, Australia (grass)
Zimbabwe	3
Australia	2
Brussels, Belgium (clay)
Belgium	3
Netherlands	1
Atlanta, GA, United States (hard)
Russia	2
United States	3

Quarterfinals; 17–19 July
Hamburg, Germany (hard)
Sweden	3
Germany	2
A Coruña, Spain (clay)
Spain	4
Switzerland	1
Prato, Italy (clay)
Italy	5
Zimbabwe	0
Indianapolis, IN, United States (hard)
Belgium	1
United States	4

Semifinals; 25–27 September
Stockholm, Sweden (indoor carpet)
Sweden	4
Spain	1
Milwaukee, WI, United States (indoor hard)
Italy	4
United States	1

Final; 4–6 December
Milan, Italy (indoor clay)
Sweden	4
Italy	1

== First round ==
=== Slovakia vs. Sweden ===
Slovakia
2
Incheba Arena, Bratislava, Slovakia
3–5 April 1998
Clay (indoors)

Sweden
3

			1	2	3	4	5
1	(Slovakia) (Sweden)	Dominik Hrbatý; Magnus Norman	7^{7} 6^{5}	4; 6	6; 4	3; 6	6; 2
2	(Slovakia) (Sweden)	Karol Kučera; Mikael Tillström	1; 6	6; 1	6; 2	6; 4
3	(Slovakia) (Sweden)	Martin Hromec / Ján Krošlák; Magnus Larsson / Mikael Tillström	2; 6	3; 6	4; 6
4	(Slovakia) (Sweden)	Karol Kučera; Magnus Norman	3; 6	6; 4	3; 6	6; 3	3; 6
5	(Slovakia) (Sweden)	Dominik Hrbatý; Magnus Gustafsson	2; 6	7; 5	5; 7	6^{4} 7^{7}

=== Germany vs. South Africa ===
Germany
5
Stadthalle Bremen, Bremen, Germany
3–5 April 1998
Carpet (indoors)

South Africa
0

			1	2	3	4	5
1	(Germany) (South Africa)	Nicolas Kiefer; Grant Stafford	4; 6	4; 6	6; 1	6; 2	6; 2
2	(Germany) (South Africa)	Tommy Haas; Wayne Ferreira	7^{7} 6^{2}	3; 6	6; 3	6; 4
3	(Germany) (South Africa)	Boris Becker / David Prinosil; David Adams / Ellis Ferreira	5; 7	6; 4	6; 4	6; 3
4	(Germany) (South Africa)	David Prinosil; Wayne Ferreira	6; 4	6^{4} 7^{7}	7^{7} 6^{4}
5	(Germany) (South Africa)	Tommy Haas; Grant Stafford	6; 1	7^{7} 6^{4}

=== Brazil vs. Spain ===
Brazil
2
Moinhos de Vento Park, Porto Alegre, Brazil
3–5 April 1998
Clay

Spain
3

			1	2	3	4	5
1	(Brazil) (Spain)	Gustavo Kuerten; Carlos Moyá	5; 7	1; 6	6; 4	6; 4	6; 4
2	(Brazil) (Spain)	Fernando Meligeni; Àlex Corretja	6; 4	4; 6	6; 3	4; 6	4; 6
3	(Brazil) (Spain)	Gustavo Kuerten / Jaime Oncins; Àlex Corretja / Javier Sánchez	6; 1	7; 5	3; 6	6; 2
4	(Brazil) (Spain)	Gustavo Kuerten; Àlex Corretja	3; 6	5; 7	6; 4	4; 6
5	(Brazil) (Spain)	Fernando Meligeni; Carlos Moyá	6^{4} 7^{7}	2; 6	2; 6

=== Switzerland vs. Czech Republic ===
Switzerland
3
Saalsporthalle, Zürich, Switzerland
3–5 April 1998
Carpet (indoors)

Czech Republic
2

			1	2	3	4	5
1	(Switzerland) (Czech Republic)	Ivo Heuberger; Bohdan Ulihrach	7^{9} 6^{7}	0; 6	5; 7	2; 6
2	(Switzerland) (Czech Republic)	Marc Rosset; Daniel Vacek	3; 6	6; 2	7^{7} 6^{5}	6; 0
3	(Switzerland) (Czech Republic)	Lorenzo Manta / Marc Rosset; Martin Damm / Daniel Vacek	6; 4	6^{5} 7^{7}	4; 6	6; 1	6; 4
4	(Switzerland) (Czech Republic)	Marc Rosset; Bohdan Ulihrach	6; 4	7; 5	7; 5
5	(Switzerland) (Czech Republic)	Ivo Heuberger; Martin Damm	6^{3} 7^{7}	7; 5	6^{5} 7^{7}

=== Italy vs. India ===
Italy
4
Centro Sportivo Valletta Cambiaso, Genova, Italy
3–5 April 1998
Clay

India
1

			1	2	3	4	5
1	(Italy) (India)	Andrea Gaudenzi; Srinath Prahlad	6; 0	6; 2	1; 6	6; 2
2	(Italy) (India)	Davide Sanguinetti; Mahesh Bhupathi	4; 6	4; 6	4; 6
3	(Italy) (India)	Andrea Gaudenzi / Diego Nargiso; Mahesh Bhupathi / Fazaluddin Syed	6; 3	6; 4	3; 6	6; 3
4	(Italy) (India)	Andrea Gaudenzi; Mahesh Bhupathi	6; 1	7^{7} 6^{3}	6; 1
5	(Italy) (India)	Davide Sanguinetti; Srinath Prahlad	6; 2	6; 3

=== Australia vs. Zimbabwe ===
Australia
2
Mildura Lawn Tennis Club, Mildura, Australia
3–5 April 1998
Grass

Zimbabwe
3

			1	2	3	4	5
1	(Australia) (Zimbabwe)	Jason Stoltenberg; Wayne Black	6; 3	6; 4	5; 7	7; 5
2	(Australia) (Zimbabwe)	Pat Rafter; Byron Black	6; 3	3; 6	2; 6	6^{0} 7^{7}
3	(Australia) (Zimbabwe)	Todd Woodbridge / Mark Woodforde; Byron Black / Wayne Black	6; 4	7^{8} 6^{6}	6; 2
4	(Australia) (Zimbabwe)	Mark Woodforde; Wayne Black	3; 6	5; 7	7^{7} 6^{3}	4; 6
5	(Australia) (Zimbabwe)	Jason Stoltenberg; Byron Black	2; 6	6; 3	3; 6	4; 6

=== Belgium vs. Netherlands ===
Belgium
3
Royal Primerose Tennis Club, Brussels, Belgium
3–5 April 1998
Clay

Netherlands
2

			1	2	3	4	5
1	(Belgium) (Netherlands)	Johan Van Herck; Jan Siemerink	4; 6	3; 6	6; 4	1; 6
2	(Belgium) (Netherlands)	Filip Dewulf; Sjeng Schalken	7; 5	6; 2	7; 5
3	(Belgium) (Netherlands)	Filip Dewulf / Libor Pimek; Jacco Eltingh / Jan Siemerink	1; 6	4; 6	4; 6
4	(Belgium) (Netherlands)	Filip Dewulf; John van Lottum	6; 4	6; 0	6; 4
5	(Belgium) (Netherlands)	Christophe Van Garsse; Sjeng Schalken	6; 4	6; 4	3; 6	3; 6	6; 3

=== United States vs. Russia ===
United States
3
Stone Mountain Park, Atlanta, GA, United States
4–6 April 1998
Hard

Russia
2

			1	2	3	4	5
1	(United States) (Russia)	Jim Courier; Yevgeny Kafelnikov	2; 6	7; 5	7^{7} 6^{2}	4; 6	4; 6
2	(United States) (Russia)	Andre Agassi; Marat Safin	6; 3	6; 3	6; 3
3	(United States) (Russia)	Todd Martin / Richey Reneberg; Yevgeny Kafelnikov / Marat Safin	7^{7} 6^{3}	6; 1	2; 6	6; 1
4	(United States) (Russia)	Andre Agassi; Yevgeny Kafelnikov	3; 6	0; 6	6^{3} 7^{7}
5	(United States) (Russia)	Jim Courier; Marat Safin	0; 6	6; 4	4; 6	6; 1	6; 4

== Quarterfinals ==
=== Germany vs. Sweden ===
Germany
2
National Centre, Hamburg, Germany
17–19 July 1998
Hard

Sweden
3

			1	2	3	4	5
1	(Germany) (Sweden)	Tommy Haas; Jonas Björkman	6; 3	7^{7} 6^{4}	7; 5
2	(Germany) (Sweden)	Nicolas Kiefer; Thomas Enqvist	3; 6	3; 6	5; 7
3	(Germany) (Sweden)	Boris Becker / David Prinosil; Jonas Björkman / Nicklas Kulti	6; 4	6^{5} 7^{7}	6^{5} 7^{7}	4; 6
4	(Germany) (Sweden)	Nicolas Kiefer; Jonas Björkman	3; 6	6; 4	2; 6	7; 5	4; 6
5	(Germany) (Sweden)	Tommy Haas; Magnus Larsson	6^{4} 7^{7}	7; 5	6; 2

=== Spain vs. Switzerland ===
Spain
4
Club Tenis Coruña, A Coruña, Spain
17–19 July 1998
Clay

Switzerland
1

			1	2	3	4	5
1	(Spain) (Switzerland)	Carlos Moyá; Ivo Heuberger	6; 1	6; 2	6; 1
2	(Spain) (Switzerland)	Àlex Corretja; Marc Rosset	6; 1	6; 2	6; 2
3	(Spain) (Switzerland)	Julián Alonso / Javier Sánchez; Lorenzo Manta / Marc Rosset	6; 3	3; 6	4; 6	7; 5	2; 6
4	(Spain) (Switzerland)	Carlos Moyá; Marc Rosset	7; 5	6; 1	7; 5
5	(Spain) (Switzerland)	Àlex Corretja; George Bastl	6; 0	7; 5

=== Italy vs. Zimbabwe ===
Italy
5
Tennis Club Prato, Prato, Italy
17–19 July 1998
Clay

Zimbabwe
0

			1	2	3	4	5
1	(Italy) (Zimbabwe)	Andrea Gaudenzi; Wayne Black	6; 3	6; 3	6; 4
2	(Italy) (Zimbabwe)	Davide Sanguinetti; Byron Black	6; 3	6; 3	6; 0
3	(Italy) (Zimbabwe)	Andrea Gaudenzi / Diego Nargiso; Byron Black / Wayne Black	1; 6	7; 5	7; 5	6; 3
4	(Italy) (Zimbabwe)	Diego Nargiso; Genius Chidzikwe	6; 0	6; 2
5	(Italy) (Zimbabwe)	Davide Sanguinetti; Wayne Black	6; 4	3; 6	6; 3

=== United States vs. Belgium ===
United States
4
State Tennis Club, Indianapolis, IN, United States
17–19 July 1998
Hard

Belgium
1

			1	2	3	4	5
1	(United States) (Belgium)	Jim Courier; Filip Dewulf	6; 3	7^{7} 6^{1}	2; 6	6; 3
2	(United States) (Belgium)	Andre Agassi; Christophe Van Garsse	6; 2	6; 2	6; 2
3	(United States) (Belgium)	Jim Courier / Todd Martin; Xavier Malisse / Johan Van Herck	5; 7	6; 2	6^{2} 7^{7}	7^{7} 6^{5}	6; 1
4	(United States) (Belgium)	Todd Martin; Xavier Malisse	7^{7} 6^{1}	6; 3
5	(United States) (Belgium)	Jim Courier; Christophe Van Garsse	6; 3	1; 4				retired

== Semifinals ==
=== Sweden vs. Spain ===
Sweden
4
Kungliga tennishallen, Stockholm, Sweden
25–27 September 1998
Carpet (indoors)

Spain
1

			1	2	3	4	5
1	(Sweden) (Spain)	Jonas Björkman; Àlex Corretja	6; 3	7; 5	6^{5} 7^{7}	6; 3
2	(Sweden) (Spain)	Thomas Johansson; Carlos Moyá	7; 5	7^{7} 6^{4}	7^{8} 6^{6}
3	(Sweden) (Spain)	Jonas Björkman / Nicklas Kulti; Julián Alonso / Javier Sánchez	6; 2	6; 2	6; 2
4	(Sweden) (Spain)	Jonas Björkman; Carlos Moyá	6; 3	7; 5
5	(Sweden) (Spain)	Thomas Johansson; Julián Alonso	1; 6	6^{3} 7^{7}

=== United States vs. Italy ===
United States
1
Wisconsin Center Arena, Milwaukee, WI, United States
25–27 September 1998
Hard (indoors)

Italy
4

			1	2	3	4	5
1	(United States) (Italy)	Jan-Michael Gambill; Andrea Gaudenzi	2; 6	6; 0	6^{0} 7^{7}	6^{4} 7^{7}
2	(United States) (Italy)	Todd Martin; Davide Sanguinetti	6^{0} 7^{7}	3; 6	6^{8} 7^{10}
3	(United States) (Italy)	Justin Gimelstob / Todd Martin; Andrea Gaudenzi / Diego Nargiso	4; 6	6^{3} 7^{7}	7; 5	6; 2	3; 6
4	(United States) (Italy)	Justin Gimelstob; Gianluca Pozzi	6^{4} 7^{7}	5; 7
5	(United States) (Italy)	Jan-Michael Gambill; Davide Sanguinetti	4; 6	6; 3	6; 3

== Final ==
=== Italy vs. Sweden ===
Italy
1
Forum di Assago, Milan, Italy
4–6 December 1998
Clay (indoors)

Sweden
4

			1	2	3	4	5
1	(Italy) (Sweden)	Andrea Gaudenzi; Magnus Norman	7^{11} 6^{9}	6^{0} 7^{7}	6; 4	3; 6	6; 6	retired
2	(Italy) (Sweden)	Davide Sanguinetti; Magnus Gustafsson	1; 6	4; 6	0; 6
3	(Italy) (Sweden)	Diego Nargiso / Davide Sanguinetti; Jonas Björkman / Nicklas Kulti	6^{1} 7^{7}	1; 6	3; 6
4	(Italy) (Sweden)	Gianluca Pozzi; Magnus Gustafsson	4; 6	2; 6
5	(Italy) (Sweden)	Diego Nargiso; Magnus Norman	6; 2	6; 3
