= 1995 Davis Cup World Group =

- Date: 3 February – 3 December
- Edition: 15th

Champions
- United States
- Davis Cup

The World Group was the highest level of Davis Cup competition in 1995. The first-round losers went into the Davis Cup World Group qualifying round, and the winners progressed to the quarterfinals and were guaranteed a World Group spot for 1996.

Sweden were the defending champions, but were eliminated in the semifinals.

The United States won the title, defeating Russia in the final, 3–2. The final was held at the Olympic Stadium in Moscow, Russia, from 1 to 3 December. It was the US team's 31st Davis Cup title overall.

== Participating teams ==
Participating teams
Australia	Austria	Belgium	Croatia
Czech Republic	Denmark	France	Germany
Italy	Netherlands	Russia	South Africa
Spain	Sweden	Switzerland	United States

== Draw ==
First round 3–6 February
St. Petersburg, United States (indoor carpet)
United States	4
France	1
Naples, Italy (clay)
Czech Republic	1
Italy	4
Copenhagen, Denmark (indoor carpet)
Sweden	3
Denmark	2
Vienna, Austria (indoor hard)
Spain	1
Austria	4
Durban, South Africa (hard)
South Africa	3
Australia	2
Antwerp, Belgium (indoor clay)
Belgium	1
Russia	4
Geneva, Switzerland (indoor clay)
Switzerland	1
Netherlands	4
Karlsruhe, Germany (indoor hard)
Croatia	1
Germany	4

Quarterfinals; 31 March–2 April
Palermo, Italy (clay)
United States	5
Italy	0
Växjö, Sweden (indoor carpet)
Sweden	5
Austria	0
Moscow, Russia (indoor carpet)
South Africa	1
Russia	4
Utrecht, Netherlands (indoor hard)
Netherlands	1
Germany	4

Semifinals; 22–24 September
Las Vegas, United States (hard)
United States	4
Sweden	1
Moscow, Russia (indoor clay)
Russia	3
Germany	2

Final; 1–3 December
Moscow, Russia (indoor clay)
United States	3
Russia	2

== First round ==
=== United States vs. France ===
United States
4
Bayfront Center, St. Petersburg, United States
3–5 February 1995
Carpet (indoors)

France
1

			1	2	3	4	5
1	(United States) (France)	Todd Martin; Cédric Pioline	5; 7	2; 6	4; 6
2	(United States) (France)	Jim Courier; Guy Forget	6; 1	6; 2	6; 2
3	(United States) (France)	Jared Palmer / Richey Reneberg; Olivier Delaître / Guy Forget	6; 4	3; 6	6; 3	6; 4
4	(United States) (France)	Todd Martin; Guy Forget	6; 3	7^{7} 6^{3}	7^{7} 6^{5}
5	(United States) (France)	Jim Courier; Cédric Pioline	6; 4	6; 3

=== Italy vs. Czech Republic ===
Italy
4
Tennis Club Napoli, Naples, Italy
3–5 February 1995
Clay

Czech Republic
1

			1	2	3	4	5
1	(Italy) (Czech Republic)	Andrea Gaudenzi; Daniel Vacek	6^{5} 7^{7}	4; 6	6; 1	6^{4} 7^{7}
2	(Italy) (Czech Republic)	Renzo Furlan; Ctislav Doseděl	4; 6	7^{7} 6^{3}	6; 4	6; 4
3	(Italy) (Czech Republic)	Cristian Brandi / Stefano Pescosolido; Martin Damm / Cyril Suk	6; 2	1; 6	7^{7} 6^{3}	7^{7} 6^{2}
4	(Italy) (Czech Republic)	Andrea Gaudenzi; Ctislav Doseděl	6; 3	6; 2	4; 6	6; 2
5	(Italy) (Czech Republic)	Renzo Furlan; Daniel Vacek	3; 6	7^{8} 6^{6}	6; 2

=== Denmark vs. Sweden ===
Denmark
2
Brøndbyhallen, Brøndby, Denmark
3–5 February 1995
Carpet (indoors)

Sweden
3

			1	2	3	4	5
1	(Denmark) (Sweden)	Kenneth Carlsen; Jonas Björkman	4; 6	6; 3	6; 4	6; 4
2	(Denmark) (Sweden)	Frederik Fetterlein; Stefan Edberg	1; 6	7; 5	6; 4	6; 3
3	(Denmark) (Sweden)	Kenneth Carlsen / Morten Christensen; Jan Apell / Jonas Björkman	7^{8} 6^{6}	3; 6	4; 6	2; 6
4	(Denmark) (Sweden)	Kenneth Carlsen; Stefan Edberg	6; 2	3; 6	2; 6	6^{3} 7^{7}
5	(Denmark) (Sweden)	Frederik Fetterlein; Jonas Björkman	7^{7} 6^{5}	4; 6	7^{7} 6^{5}	3; 6	4; 6

=== Austria vs. Spain ===
Austria
4
Ferry-Dusika-Hallenstadion, Vienna, Austria
3–5 February 1995
Hard (indoors)

Spain
1

			1	2	3	4	5
1	(Austria) (Spain)	Gilbert Schaller; Sergi Bruguera	1; 6	2; 6	2; 6
2	(Austria) (Spain)	Thomas Muster; Carlos Costa	6; 4	6; 4	6; 4
3	(Austria) (Spain)	Alex Antonitsch / Thomas Muster; Sergi Bruguera / Emilio Sánchez	6; 2	3; 6	6; 3	6; 3
4	(Austria) (Spain)	Thomas Muster; Sergi Bruguera	6; 4	7; 5	6; 3
5	(Austria) (Spain)	Alex Antonitsch; Carlos Costa	6; 3	6; 4

=== South Africa vs. Australia ===
South Africa
3
Westridge Park Stadium, Durban, South Africa
3–6 February 1995
Hard

Australia
2

			1	2	3	4	5
1	(South Africa) (Australia)	Marcos Ondruska; Pat Rafter	3; 6	4; 6	6; 2	4; 6
2	(South Africa) (Australia)	Wayne Ferreira; Mark Woodforde	7^{8} 6^{6}	7; 5	6; 3
3	(South Africa) (Australia)	Wayne Ferreira / Piet Norval; Todd Woodbridge / Mark Woodforde	5; 7	3; 6	6^{5} 7^{7}
4	(South Africa) (Australia)	Wayne Ferreira; Pat Rafter	6; 2	3; 6	6; 4	6; 2
5	(South Africa) (Australia)	Marcos Ondruska; Mark Woodforde	6; 4	6; 2	1; 0			retired

=== Belgium vs. Russia ===
Belgium
1
Sporthal Arena, Antwerp, Belgium
3–5 February 1995
Clay (indoors)

Russia
4

			1	2	3	4	5
1	(Belgium) (Russia)	Filip Dewulf; Andrei Chesnokov	4; 6	4; 6	5; 7
2	(Belgium) (Russia)	Kris Goossens; Yevgeny Kafelnikov	6; 4	4; 6	3; 6	4; 6
3	(Belgium) (Russia)	Filip Dewulf / Libor Pimek; Yevgeny Kafelnikov / Andrei Olhovskiy	6; 2	5; 7	5; 7	3; 6
4	(Belgium) (Russia)	Johan Van Herck; Yevgeny Kafelnikov	6^{2} 7^{7}	6; 3	6; 1
5	(Belgium) (Russia)	Kris Goossens; Andrei Chesnokov	7^{7} 6^{5}	2; 6	6^{2} 7^{7}

=== Switzerland vs. Netherlands ===
Switzerland
1
Palexpo, Geneva, Switzerland
3–5 February 1995
Clay (indoors)

Netherlands
4

			1	2	3	4	5
1	(Switzerland) (Netherlands)	Marc Rosset; Jacco Eltingh	6; 4	2; 3				retired
2	(Switzerland) (Netherlands)	Jakob Hlasek; Richard Krajicek	4; 6	6; 1	6; 3	6; 4
3	(Switzerland) (Netherlands)	Jakob Hlasek / Lorenzo Manta; Jacco Eltingh / Paul Haarhuis	3; 6	4; 6	7; 5	4; 6
4	(Switzerland) (Netherlands)	Lorenzo Manta; Richard Krajicek	4; 6	4; 6	2; 6
5	(Switzerland) (Netherlands)	Patrick Mohr; Jan Siemerink	4; 6	3; 6

=== Germany vs. Croatia ===
Germany
4
Europahalle, Karlsruhe, Germany
3–5 February 1995
Hard (indoors)

Croatia
1

			1	2	3	4	5
1	(Germany) (Croatia)	Michael Stich; Goran Ivanišević	7^{7} 6^{3}	4; 6	6; 1	6; 4
2	(Germany) (Croatia)	Boris Becker; Saša Hiršzon	6; 4	6; 1	6; 3
3	(Germany) (Croatia)	Boris Becker / Michael Stich; Saša Hiršzon / Goran Ivanišević	6; 4	7^{7} 6^{3}	7; 5
4	(Germany) (Croatia)	Markus Zoecke; Goran Ivanišević	4; 6	6^{4} 7^{7}
5	(Germany) (Croatia)	Michael Stich; Saša Hiršzon	7^{7} 6^{4}	7^{7} 6^{4}

== Quarterfinals ==
=== Italy vs. United States ===
Italy
0
Tennis Club Palermo, Palermo, Italy
31 March–2 April 1995
Clay

United States
5

			1	2	3	4	5
1	(Italy) (United States)	Andrea Gaudenzi; Andre Agassi	4; 6	4; 6	1; 6
2	(Italy) (United States)	Renzo Furlan; Pete Sampras	6^{3} 7^{7}	3; 6	0; 6
3	(Italy) (United States)	Cristian Brandi / Stefano Pescosolido; Jared Palmer / Richey Reneberg	1; 6	7^{7} 6^{2}	4; 6	3; 6
4	(Italy) (United States)	Andrea Gaudenzi; Pete Sampras	3; 6	6; 1	3; 6
5	(Italy) (United States)	Renzo Furlan; Jared Palmer	4; 6	3; 6

=== Sweden vs. Austria ===
Sweden
5
Växjö Tipshall, Växjö, Sweden
31 March–2 April 1995
Carpet (indoors)

Austria
0

			1	2	3	4	5
1	(Sweden) (Austria)	Magnus Larsson; Thomas Muster	6; 1	7^{7} 6^{5}	7; 5
2	(Sweden) (Austria)	Stefan Edberg; Alex Antonitsch	6; 4	3; 6	6; 3	6; 4
3	(Sweden) (Austria)	Jan Apell / Jonas Björkman; Alex Antonitsch / Thomas Muster	7; 5	6; 3	6; 3
4	(Sweden) (Austria)	Stefan Edberg; Thomas Muster	6; 4	6; 2
5	(Sweden) (Austria)	Magnus Larsson; Gilbert Schaller	7^{7} 6^{4}	6; 4

=== Russia vs. South Africa ===
Russia
4
Olympic Stadium, Moscow, Russia
31 March–2 April 1995
Carpet (indoors)

South Africa
1

			1	2	3	4	5
1	(Russia) (South Africa)	Yevgeny Kafelnikov; Marcos Ondruska	6; 1	6; 4	6; 4
2	(Russia) (South Africa)	Alexander Volkov; Wayne Ferreira	6^{4} 7^{7}	6; 4	7^{7} 6^{5}	2; 6	4; 6
3	(Russia) (South Africa)	Yevgeny Kafelnikov / Andrei Olhovskiy; Wayne Ferreira / Gary Muller	4; 6	4; 6	7^{8} 6^{6}	7^{7} 6^{3}	6; 3
4	(Russia) (South Africa)	Yevgeny Kafelnikov; Wayne Ferreira	6; 4	7; 5	6; 1
5	(Russia) (South Africa)	Alexander Volkov; Marcos Ondruska	6; 1	6; 1

=== Netherlands vs. Germany ===
Netherlands
1
Jaarbeurs, Utrecht, Netherlands
31 March–2 April 1995
Hard (indoors)

Germany
4

			1	2	3	4	5
1	(Netherlands) (Germany)	Paul Haarhuis; Boris Becker	4; 6	6; 2	6; 4	7^{7} 6^{4}
2	(Netherlands) (Germany)	Richard Krajicek; Michael Stich	6; 3	4; 6	4; 6	4; 6
3	(Netherlands) (Germany)	Jacco Eltingh / Paul Haarhuis; Boris Becker / Michael Stich	7^{7} 6^{1}	6; 4	4; 6	5; 7	3; 6
4	(Netherlands) (Germany)	Richard Krajicek; Boris Becker	3; 6	4; 6	6; 3	1; 6
5	(Netherlands) (Germany)	Paul Haarhuis; Michael Stich	3; 6	6; 4	4; 6

== Semifinals ==
=== United States vs. Sweden ===
United States
4
Caesars Palace, Las Vegas, NV, United States
22–24 September 1995
Hard

Sweden
1

			1	2	3	4	5
1	(United States) (Sweden)	Pete Sampras; Thomas Enqvist	6; 3	6; 4	3; 6	6; 3
2	(United States) (Sweden)	Andre Agassi; Mats Wilander	7^{7} 6^{5}	6; 2	6; 2
3	(United States) (Sweden)	Todd Martin / Jonathan Stark; Jonas Björkman / Stefan Edberg	3; 6	4; 6	4; 6
4	(United States) (Sweden)	Todd Martin; Thomas Enqvist	7; 5	7; 5	7^{7} 6^{2}
5	(United States) (Sweden)	Pete Sampras; Mats Wilander	2; 6	7^{7} 6^{4}	6; 3

=== Russia vs. Germany ===
Russia
3
Olympic Stadium, Moscow, Russia
22–24 September 1995
Clay (indoors)

Germany
2

			1	2	3	4	5
1	(Russia) (Germany)	Andrei Chesnokov; Boris Becker	7^{7} 6^{4}	3; 6	6^{3} 7^{7}	5; 7
2	(Russia) (Germany)	Yevgeny Kafelnikov; Michael Stich	1; 6	6; 4	3; 6	4; 6
3	(Russia) (Germany)	Yevgeny Kafelnikov / Andrei Olhovskiy; Boris Becker / Michael Stich	7^{7} 6^{3}	6; 4	2; 6	6^{5} 7^{7}	7; 5
4	(Russia) (Germany)	Yevgeny Kafelnikov; Bernd Karbacher	6; 1	7^{7} 6^{5}	6; 2
5	(Russia) (Germany)	Andrei Chesnokov; Michael Stich	6; 4	1; 6	1; 6	6; 3	14; 12

== Final ==
=== Russia vs. United States ===
Russia
2
Olympic Stadium, Moscow, Russia
1–3 December 1995
Clay (indoors)

United States
3

			1	2	3	4	5
1	(Russia) (United States)	Andrei Chesnokov; Pete Sampras	6; 3	4; 6	3; 6	7^{7} 6^{5}	4; 6
2	(Russia) (United States)	Yevgeny Kafelnikov; Jim Courier	7^{7} 6^{1}	7; 5	6; 3
3	(Russia) (United States)	Yevgeny Kafelnikov / Andrei Olhovskiy; Todd Martin / Pete Sampras	5; 7	4; 6	3; 6
4	(Russia) (United States)	Yevgeny Kafelnikov; Pete Sampras	2; 6	4; 6	6^{4} 7^{7}
5	(Russia) (United States)	Andrei Chesnokov; Jim Courier	6^{1} 7^{7}	7; 5	6; 0
