= 1998 Davis Cup World Group qualifying round =

The 1998 Davis Cup World Group qualifying round was held from 25 to 28 September. These were the main play-offs of the 1998 Davis Cup. The winners of playoffs advanced to the 1999 Davis Cup World Group, and the losers were relegated to their respective Zonal Regions I.

== Teams ==
Bold indicates team had qualified for the 1999 Davis Cup World Group.

From World Group

- **Australia**
- **Brazil**
- **Czech Republic**
- India
- **Netherlands**
- **Russia**
- **Slovakia**
- South Africa

From Americas Group I

- Argentina
- Ecuador

From Asia/Oceania Group I

- Japan
- Uzbekistan

From Europe/Africa Group I

- **France**
- **Great Britain**
- Israel
- Romania

== Results summary ==
Date: 25–28 September

The eight losing teams in the World Group first round ties and eight winners of the Zonal Group I final round ties competed in the World Group qualifying round for spots in the 1999 World Group.

Home team	Score	Visiting team	Location	Venue	Door	Surface	Ref.
**Australia**	5–0	Uzbekistan	Townsville	Townsville Entertainment and Convention Centre	Indoor	Hard	
**Brazil**	3–0	Romania	Florianópolis	Hotel Costão do Santinho	Outdoor	Clay	
**Czech Republic**	5–0	South Africa	Prague	National Tennis Centre	Outdoor	Clay	
Israel	1–4	**France**	Ramat HaSharon	Canada Stadium	Outdoor	Hard	
**Great Britain**	3–2	India	Nottingham	Nottingham Tennis Centre	Outdoor	Hard	
**Netherlands**	5–0	Ecuador	Eindhoven	Indoor-Sportcentrum Eindhoven	Indoor	Carpet	
Japan	1–3	**Russia**	Osaka	Utsubo Tennis Center	Outdoor	Hard	
Argentina	2–3	**Slovakia**	Buenos Aires	Buenos Aires Lawn Tennis Club	Outdoor	Clay	

- Australia, Brazil, Czech Republic, Netherlands, Russia and Slovakia remain in the World Group in 1999.
- France and Great Britain are promoted to the World Group in 1999.
- Argentina, Ecuador, Israel, Japan, Romania and Uzbekistan remain in Zonal Group I in 1999.
- India and South Africa are relegated to Zonal Group I in 1999.

== Qualifying results ==
=== Australia vs. Uzbekistan ===
Australia
5
Townsville Entertainment and Convention Centre, Townsville, Australia
25–27 September 1998
Hard (indoors)

Uzbekistan
0

			1	2	3	4	5
1	(Australia) (Uzbekistan)	**Pat Rafter**; Oleg Ogorodov	**6**; 3	**6**; 3	**6**; 4
2	(Australia) (Uzbekistan)	**Jason Stoltenberg**; Vadim Kutsenko	**7**; 5	**6**; 1	**6**; 0
3	(Australia) (Uzbekistan)	**Todd Woodbridge / Mark Woodforde**; Oleg Ogorodov / Dmitri Tomashevich	**6**; 3	**7^{7}** 6^{3}	**7^{7}** 6^{4}
4	(Australia) (Uzbekistan)	**Pat Rafter**; Dmitri Tomashevich	**6**; 2	**6**; 4
5	(Australia) (Uzbekistan)	**Jason Stoltenberg**; Oleg Ogorodov	**6**; 3	**6**; 3

=== Brazil vs. Romania ===
Brazil
3
Hotel Costão do Santinho, Florianópolis, Brazil
25–27 September 1998
Clay

Romania
0

			1	2	3	4	5
1	(Brazil) (Romania)	**Fernando Meligeni**; Adrian Voinea	**6**; 1	**6**; 4	**7^{7}** 6^{3}
2	(Brazil) (Romania)	**Gustavo Kuerten**; Andrei Pavel	**7**; 5	**6**; 3	**6**; 3
3	(Brazil) (Romania)	**Gustavo Kuerten / Jaime Oncins**; Andrei Pavel / Gabriel Trifu	**7**; 5	**6**; 4	**6**; 4
4	(Brazil) (Romania)	Gustavo Kuerten; Adrian Voinea						**not** **played**
5	(Brazil) (Romania)	Fernando Meligeni; Andrei Pavel						**not** **played**

=== Czech Republic vs. South Africa ===
Czech Republic
5
National Tennis Centre, Prague, Czech Republic
25–27 September 1998
Clay

South Africa
0

			1	2	3	4	5
1	(Czech Republic) (South Africa)	**Ctislav Doseděl**; Wayne Ferreira	**6**; 2	**6**; 3	**6**; 4
2	(Czech Republic) (South Africa)	**Bohdan Ulihrach**; Marcos Ondruska	**6**; 1	**6**; 2	**6**; 1
3	(Czech Republic) (South Africa)	**Jiří Novák / David Rikl**; Wayne Ferreira / Piet Norval	**6**; 4	**6**; 2	**6**; 2
4	(Czech Republic) (South Africa)	**Bohdan Ulihrach**; David Nainkin	**6**; 0	**6**; 1
5	(Czech Republic) (South Africa)	**Ctislav Doseděl**; Piet Norval	**6**; 1	**6**; 1

=== Israel vs. France ===
Israel
1
Canada Stadium, Ramat HaSharon, Israel
25–27 September 1998
Hard

France
4

			1	2	3	4	5
1	(Israel) (France)	Amir Hadad; **Cédric Pioline**	2; **6**	3; **6**	3; **6**
2	(Israel) (France)	Harel Levy; **Guillaume Raoux**	6^{1} **7^{7}**	2; **6**	4; **6**
3	(Israel) (France)	Noam Behr / Eyal Erlich; **Jérôme Golmard / Guillaume Raoux**	1; **6**	4; **6**	3; **6**
4	(Israel) (France)	**Harel Levy**; Cédric Pioline	3; **6**	**6**; 1	**6**; 2
5	(Israel) (France)	Amir Hadad; **Nicolas Escudé**	**6**; 4	2; **6**	1; **6**

=== Great Britain vs. India ===
Great Britain
3
Nottingham Tennis Centre, Nottingham, Great Britain
25–27 September 1998
Hard

India
2

			1	2	3	4	5
1	(United Kingdom) (India)	**Greg Rusedski**; Leander Paes	2; **6**	**6**; 3	3; **6**	**6**; 2	**11**; 9
2	(United Kingdom) (India)	**Tim Henman**; Mahesh Bhupathi	4; **6**	**6**; 3	**6**; 3	**6**; 3
3	(United Kingdom) (India)	Neil Broad / Tim Henman; **Mahesh Bhupathi / Leander Paes**	6^{2} **7^{7}**	3; **6**	6^{3} **7^{7}**
4	(United Kingdom) (India)	**Tim Henman**; Leander Paes	**7^{7}** 6^{3}	**6**; 2	**7^{7}** 6^{5}
5	(United Kingdom) (India)	Chris Wilkinson; **Mahesh Bhupathi**	3; **6**	4; **6**

=== Netherlands vs. Ecuador ===
Netherlands
5
Indoor-Sportcentrum Eindhoven, Eindhoven, Netherlands
25–27 September 1998
Carpet (indoors)

Ecuador
0

			1	2	3	4	5
1	(Netherlands) (Ecuador)	**Jan Siemerink**; Luis Morejón	**6**; 3	**6**; 3	**6**; 1
2	(Netherlands) (Ecuador)	**Paul Haarhuis**; Nicolás Lapentti	**6**; 2	**6**; 3	**6**; 2
3	(Netherlands) (Ecuador)	**Jacco Eltingh / Paul Haarhuis**; Andrés Gómez / Nicolás Lapentti	5; **7**	**6**; 1	**6**; 3	6^{1} **7^{7}**	**6**; 4
4	(Netherlands) (Ecuador)	**Jan Siemerink**; Giovanni Lapentti	**6**; 2	**6**; 1
5	(Netherlands) (Ecuador)	**Sjeng Schalken**; Luis Morejón	**6**; 0	**6**; 3

=== Japan vs. Russia ===
Japan
1
Utsubo Tennis Center, Osaka, Japan
25–27 September 1998
Hard

Russia
3

			1	2	3	4	5
1	(Japan) (Russia)	Gouichi Motomura; **Yevgeny Kafelnikov**	**6**; 4	2; **6**	3; **6**	3; **6**
2	(Japan) (Russia)	Takao Suzuki; **Marat Safin**	6^{4} **7^{7}**	2; **6**	3; **6**
3	(Japan) (Russia)	Gouichi Motomura / Takao Suzuki; **Yevgeny Kafelnikov / Marat Safin**	5; **7**	3; **6**	**6**; 4	2; **6**
4	(Japan) (Russia)	**Takao Suzuki**; Kirill Ivanov-Smolensky	**6**; 4	**6**; 4
5	(Japan) (Russia)	Gouichi Motomura; Alexander Volkov	**6**; 3					**not** **completed**

=== Argentina vs. Slovakia ===
Argentina
2
Buenos Aires Lawn Tennis Club, Buenos Aires, Argentina
25–28 September 1998
Clay

Slovakia
3

			1	2	3	4	5
1	(Argentina) (Slovakia)	Franco Squillari; **Dominik Hrbatý**	3; **6**	2; **6**	2; **6**
2	(Argentina) (Slovakia)	**Hernán Gumy**; Karol Kučera	**6**; 1	**6**; 1	**6**; 4
3	(Argentina) (Slovakia)	**Lucas Arnold Ker / Luis Lobo**; Dominik Hrbatý / Karol Kučera	**6**; 3	**6**; 4	**6**; 4
4	(Argentina) (Slovakia)	Franco Squillari; **Karol Kučera**	3; **6**	3; **6**	**6**; 3	**7^{7}** 6^{3}	4; **6**
5	(Argentina) (Slovakia)	Hernán Gumy; **Dominik Hrbatý**	2; **6**	**6**; 3	4; **6**	2; **6**
