= Germany Davis Cup team =

Davis Cup team representing Germany

Germany / West Germany
- Captain: Michael Kohlmann
- Nations Ranking: 3 (21 September 2026)
- Colors: white & black
- First year: 1913
- Years played: 90
- Ties played (W–L): 252 (165–87)
- Years in World Group: 42 (53–39)
- Davis Cup titles: 3 (1988, 1989, 1993)
- Runners-up: 2 (1970, 1985)
- Most total wins: Gottfried von Cramm (82–19)
- Most singles wins: Gottfried von Cramm (58–10)
- Most doubles wins: Gottfried von Cramm (24–9)
- Best doubles team: Kevin Krawietz / Tim Pütz (18–2)
- Most ties played: Wilhelm Bungert (43)
- Most years played: Wilhelm Bungert (14)

The Germany Davis Cup team represents Germany in Davis Cup tennis competition and are governed by the German Tennis Federation. As East Germany never participated in the Davis Cup, and the Deutscher Tennisbund remained the same organization throughout the century, the West German Davis Cup team is included in this article.

Germany has won the Davis Cup three times (1988, 1989, 1993) and finished as runners-up twice (1970, 1985).

== History ==
Germany competed in its first Davis Cup in 1913. Since then they have reached five finals.

=== First final participation in 1970 ===
In 1970, Germany reached the Davis Cup final for the first time. Having defeated Denmark, Egypt, Belgium and the Soviet Union in the European zone they played India and Spain in the so-called interzonal zone, beating both teams. In the final Wilhelm Bungert and Christian Kuhnke played Arthur Ashe and Cliff Richey in singles, and Bob Lutz/Stan Smith in doubles. The German players lost all five matches, all but one in three sets.

Tie summary Davis Cup Final 1970 - United States vs. West Germany 5–0
United States	West Germany	Score
Arthur Ashe	Wilhelm Bungert	6–2, 10–8, 6–2
Cliff Richey	Christian Kuhnke	6–3, 6–4, 6–2
Bob Lutz / Stan Smith	Wilhelm Bungert / Christian Kuhnke	6–3, 7–5, 6–4
Cliff Richey	Wilhelm Bungert	6–4, 6–4, 7–5
Arthur Ashe	Christian Kuhnke	6–8, 10–12, 9–7, 13–11, 6–4

=== Second final participation in 1985 ===
Fifteen years later Germany reached the Davis Cup final for the second time. After close successes against Spain and the United States and a clear victory against Czechoslovakia in the World Group Germany played Sweden at home in Munich. Germany played with Boris Becker and Michael Westphal in the singles and with Becker/Andreas Maurer in the double. After the fourth rubber against Mats Wilander and Stefan Edberg in the singles and Wilander/Joakim Nyström in the double the standings were 2–2. In the decisive fifth rubber Westphal lost to Stefan Edberg in four sets.

Tie summary Davis Cup Final 1985 - West Germany vs. Sweden 2–3
West Germany	Sweden	Score
Michael Westphal	Mats Wilander	3–6, 4–6, 8–10
Boris Becker	Stefan Edberg	6–3, 3–6, 7–5, 8–6
Boris Becker / Andreas Maurer	Joakim Nyström / Mats Wilander	4–6, 2–6, 1–6
Boris Becker	Mats Wilander	6–3, 2–6, 6–3, 6–3
Michael Westphal	Stefan Edberg	6–3, 5–7, 4–6, 3–6

=== First Davis Cup title in 1988 ===
Only three years later Germany reached the Davis Cup final for the third time. After three 5–0 whitewashes against Brazil, Denmark and Yugoslavia Germany once again met Sweden. Now it was Sweden's turn to lose at home. Germany secured its triumph in the third match, the double. Carl-Uwe Steeb and Boris Becker had defeated Mats Wilander and Stefan Edberg, respectively, before the German double consisting of Becker and Eric Jelen defeated Edberg and Anders Järryd in five sets. The fourth match which was shortened to best of three was won by Edberg before Sweden let Germany get its fourth point by a walkover.

Tie summary Davis Cup Final 1988 - Sweden vs. West Germany 1–4
Sweden	West Germany	Score
Mats Wilander	Carl-Uwe Steeb	10–8, 6–1, 2–6, 4–6, 6–8
Stefan Edberg	Boris Becker	3–6, 1–6, 4–6
Stefan Edberg / Anders Järryd	Boris Becker / Eric Jelen	6–3, 6–2, 5–7, 3–6, 2–6
Stefan Edberg	Carl-Uwe Steeb	6–4, 8–6
Kent Carlsson	Patrik Kühnen	walkover

=== Second Davis Cup title in 1989 ===
Germany defeated Indonesia, Czechoslovakia and the United States on the way to their second consecutive final and the final once again was Germany against Sweden. This time the final took place in Stuttgart. Mats Wilander achieved the 1–0 lead for Sweden by defeating Carl-Uwe Steeb in five sets before Boris Becker levelled the standings in a three-set victory against Stefan Edberg. Becker and Eric Jelen defeated the Sweden double of Jan Gunnarsson and Anders Järryd in five sets before Becker secured the second consecutive German Davis Cup title by defeating Mats Wilander in three sets.

Tie summary Davis Cup Final 1989 - West Germany vs. Sweden 3–2
West Germany	Sweden	Score
Carl-Uwe Steeb	Mats Wilander	7–5, 6–7^{(0–7)}, 7–6^{(7–4)}, 2–6, 3–6
Boris Becker	Stefan Edberg	6–2, 6–2, 6–4
Boris Becker / Eric Jelen	Jan Gunnarsson / Anders Järryd	7–6^{(8–6)}, 6–4, 3–6, 6–7^{(4–7)}, 6–4
Boris Becker	Mats Wilander	6–2, 6–0, 6–2
Carl-Uwe Steeb	Stefan Edberg	2–6, 4–6

=== Third Davis Cup title in 1993 ===
It took Germany four years to reach the Davis Cup final for the fifth time, and they did so by beating Russia, the Czech Republic and – once again – Sweden. In the final against Australia that took place in Düsseldorf, Germany, Michael Stich defeated Jason Stoltenberg in five sets to mark the first point for Germany. In the second Friday single, Marc-Kevin Goellner lost to Richard Fromberg with a result of 7–9 in the fifth set. Stich and Patrik Kühnen defeated their Australian counterparts Todd Woodbridge and Mark Woodforde in the double, marking the 2–1 for Germany. In the fourth rubber, Michael Stich clearly defeated Richard Fromberg in three sets before Goellner defeated Stoltenberg in the tie-break of the third and last set.

Tie summary Davis Cup Final 1993 - Germany vs. Australia 4–1
Germany	Australia	Score
Michael Stich	Jason Stoltenberg	6–7^{(2–7)}, 6–3, 6–1, 4–6, 6–3
Marc-Kevin Goellner	Richard Fromberg	6–3, 7–5, 6–7^{(8–10)}, 2–6, 7–9
Patrik Kühnen / Michael Stich	Todd Woodbridge / Mark Woodforde	7–6^{(7–4)}, 4–6, 6–3, 7–6^{(7–4)}
Michael Stich	Richard Fromberg	6–4, 6–2, 6–2
Marc-Kevin Goellner	Jason Stoltenberg	6–1, 6–7^{(2–7)}, 7–6^{(7–3)}

== Results and fixtures ==
The following are lists of match results and scheduled matches for the current year. Win Loss Fixture

=== 2026 ===
Qualifiers
first round

Germany
4
Castello, Düsseldorf, Germany
6–7 February 2026
Hard (i)

Peru
0

			1	2	3
1	(Germany) (Peru)	Yannick Hanfmann; Gonzalo Bueno	6; 4	6; 4
2	(Germany) (Peru)	Jan-Lennard Struff; Juan Pablo Varillas	6; 4	6; 2
3	(Germany) (Peru)	Kevin Krawietz / Tim Pütz; Ignacio Buse / Arklon Huertas del Pino	6; 0	2; 6	6; 4
4	(Germany) (Peru)	Justin Engel; Gonzalo Bueno	6; 3	6^{4} 7^{7}	10; 6
5	(Germany) (Peru)	Yannick Hanfmann; Juan Pablo Varillas				not played

Qualifiers
second round

Germany
3
Heristo Arena, Halle, Germany
19–20 September
Hard (i)

Croatia
1

			1	2	3
1	(Germany) (Croatia)	Alexander Zverev; Matej Dodig	6; 4	7^{7} 6^{3}
2	(Germany) (Croatia)	Daniel Altmaier; Dino Prižmić	4; 6	3; 6
3	(Germany) (Croatia)	Kevin Krawietz / Tim Pütz; Nikola Mektić / Mate Pavić	7; 5	6; 2
4	(Germany) (Croatia)	Alexander Zverev; Dino Prižmić	6; 2	6; 4
5	(Germany) (Croatia)	Daniel Altmaier; Matej Dodig				not played

2026 Davis Cup Finals, Quarterfinals

Germany

SuperTennis Arena, Bologna, Italy
26 November 2026
Hard (i)

Great Britain

		1	2	3
1	(Germany) (United Kingdom)
2	(Germany) (United Kingdom)
3	(Germany) (United Kingdom)

== Players ==
=== Current squad ===
Players representing Germany at the 2026 Davis Cup Finals
Player	Age	Win–loss 2026			Win–loss total			First year	Ties	Ranking	
Player	Age	Sgl	Dbl	Total	Sgl	Dbl	Total	First year	Ties	Sgl	Dbl
Alexander Zverev	29	2–0	0–0	2–0	13–5	0–1	13–6	2016	10	1	107
Jan-Lennard Struff	36	1–0	0–0	1–0	17–12	4–0	21–12	2015	26	37	214
Yannick Hanfmann	34	1–0	0–0	1–0	6–1	0–0	6–1	2017	7	67	279
Kevin Krawietz	34	0–0	2–0	2–0	0–1	21–2	21–3	2019	23	–	11
Tim Pütz	38	0–0	2–0	2–0	0–0	23–2	23–2	2017	25	–	12

Statistics correct as of 11 November 2026.

== Team captains ==
from 1985 on

- Wilhelm Bungert (1985–1986)
- Nikola Pilić (1987–1996)
- Boris Becker (1997–1999)
- Carl-Uwe Steeb (1999–2001)
- Michael Stich (2001–2003)
- Patrik Kühnen (2003−2012)
- Carsten Arriens (2013−2014)
- Michael Kohlmann (2015−present)

== Historical results ==
=== Results until 1980 ===
==== Germany (1900–1960) ====
Year	Result
1900	did not participate
1901	no tournament
1902–1909	did not participate
1910	no tournament
1911–1912	did not participate
1913	Semifinals of the play-off (beating France 4–1, losing to United States 0–5)
1914	Semifinals of the play-off (bye, losing to Australia 0–5)
1915–1918	no tournament
1919–1926	did not participate
1927	Europe zone, quarterfinals (bye, beating Portugal 5–0, losing to South Africa 1–4)
1928	Europe zone, quarterfinals (beating Greece 4–1, beating Spain 3–2, losing to Great Britain 1–4)
1929	Interzonal round (bye, beating Spain 4–1, beating Italy 3–2, beating Czechoslovakia 4–1, beating Great Britain 4–1, losing to United States 0–5)
1930	Europe zone, 1st round (losing to Great Britain 2–3)
1931	Europe zone, 1st round (losing to South Africa 0–5)
1932	Interzonal round (beating India 5–0, beating Austria 3–2, beating Ireland 4–1, beating Great Britain 3–2, beating Italy 5–0, losing to United States 2–3)
1933	Europe zone, quarterfinal (beating Egypt 5–0, beating Netherlands 4–1, losing to Japan 1–4)
1934	Europe zone, quarterfinal (bye, losing to France 2–3)
1935	Interzonal round (bye, beating Italy 4–1, beating Australia 4–1, beating Czechoslovakia 4–1, losing to United States 2–3)
1936	Interzonal round (beating Spain 4–1, beating Hungary 5–0, beating Argentina 4–1, beating Ireland 5–0, beating Yugoslavia 3–0, losing to Australia 1–4)
1937	Interzonal round (bye, beating Austria 3–1, beating Italy 4–1, beating Belgium 4–1, beating Czechoslovakia 4–1, losing to United States 2–3)
1938	Interzonal round (bye, beating Norway 5–0, beating Hungary 3–1, beating France 3–2, beating Yugoslavia 3–2, losing to Australia 0–5)
1939	Europe zone, final (beating Switzerland 5–0, beating Poland 3–2, beating Sweden 4–1, beating Great Britain 5–0, losing to Yugoslavia 2–3)
1940–1945	no tournament
1946–1950	did not participate
1951	Europe zone, final (beating Yugoslavia 3–2, beating Denmark 4–1, beating Belgium 3–2, beating Italy 3–2, losing to Sweden 0–5)
1952	Europe zone, quarterfinal (bye, beating Brazil 3–2, losing to Denmark 1–4)
1953	Europe zone, quarterfinal (bye, beating South Africa 3–2, losing to France 1–4)
1954	Europe zone, 2nd round (bye, losing to Hungary 1–4)
1955	Europe zone, 2nd round (beating Ireland 4–1, losing to Italy 0–5)
1956	Europe zone, quarterfinal (bye, beating Ireland 4–1, losing to France 1–4)
1957	Europe zone, 2nd round (bye, losing to Mexico 1–3)
1958	Europe zone, quarterfinal (beating Netherlands 4–0, beating Belgium 3–2, losing to Great Britain 0–5)
1959	Europe zone, 1st round (losing to Brazil 0–4)
1960	Europe zone, quarterfinal (beating Czechoslovakia 3–2, beating Poland 4–1, losing to Sweden 1–4

==== West Germany (1960–1980) ====
Year	Result
1961	Europe zone, quarterfinal (beating Czechoslovakia 3–2, beating Netherlands 5–0, losing to Italy 2–3)
1962	Europe zone, quarterfinal (beating Spain 3–2, beating Romania 5–0, losing to South Africa 2–3)
1963	Europe zone, 1st round (losing to Spain 2–3)
1964	Europe zone, semifinal (beating Belgium 5–0, beating Soviet Union 4–1, beating Denmark 4–1, losing to Sweden 2–3)
1965	Europe zone, quarterfinal (beating Switzerland 5–0, beating Luxembourg 5–0, losing to Spain 1–4)
1966	Interzonal round, semifinal (beating Norway 5–0, beating Switzerland 4–1, beating Great Britain 3–2, beating South Africa 3–2, losing to India 2–3)
1967	Europe zone B, 1st round (losing to Soviet Union 2–3)
1968	Interzonal round, semifinal (beating Switzerland 4–1, beating Bulgaria 5–0, beating Czechoslovakia 4–1, beating South Africa 3–2, losing to India 2–3)
1969	Europe zone B, semifinal (beating New Zealand 4–1, beating Sweden 4–1, losing to Great Britain 2–3)
1970	2nd place (beating Denmark 4–1, beating Egypt 5–0, beating Belgium 5–0, beating Soviet Union 3–2, beating India 5–0, beating Spain 4–1, losing to United States 0–5)
1971	Europe zone A, final (bye, beating Austria 4–1, beating Hungary 4–1, losing to Romania 0–5)
1972	Europe zone B, semifinal (beating Greece 5–0, beating Ireland 5–0, losing to Czechoslovakia 2–3)
1973	Europe zone A, semifinal (beating Switzerland 3–0, beating Great Britain 4–1, losing to Czechoslovakia 2–3)
1974	Europe zone A, semifinal (beating Denmark 5–0, beating Spain 3–2, losing to Czechoslovakia 2–3)
1975	Europe zone B, 1st round (beating Switzerland 5–0, losing to Sweden 2–3)
1976	Europe zone B, 1st round (beating Denmark 5–0, losing to the USSR 1–4)
1977	Europe zone B, quarterfinal of the preliminary round (losing to Poland 1–3)
1978	Europe zone A, 1st round (beating Switzerland 5–0, losing to Hungary 2–3)
1979	Europe zone B, 1st round (beating Israel 3–2, losing to Romania 1–4)
1980	Europe zone A, semifinal (beating Norway 4–0, beating Spain 3–2, losing to Sweden 1–4)

=== World Group era ===
Here is the list of all match-ups since 1981, when the competition started being held in the World Group format.

==== 1980s ====
Year	Competition	Date	Location	Opponent	Score	Result
1981	World Group, First round	6–8 March	Munich (FRG)	Argentina	2–3	Loss
1981	World Group, Relegation play-off	2–4 October	São Paulo (BRA)	Brazil	3–2	Win
1982	World Group, first round	5–7 March	Prague (TCH)	Czechoslovakia	0–5	Loss
1982	World Group, Relegation play-off	1–3 October	Buenos Aires (ARG)	Argentina	2–3	Loss
1983	Europe Zone, Quarterfinals	10–12 June	Eupen (BEL)	Belgium	5–0	Win
1983	Europe Zone, Semifinals	8–10 July	Ramat HaSharon (ISR)	Israel	3–2	Win
1983	Europe Zone, Finals	30 September–2 October	Freiburg (FRG)	Switzerland	3–2	Win
1984	World Group, First round	24–26 February	Stuttgart (FRG)	Argentina	1–4	Loss
1984	World Group, Relegation play-off	28–30 September	West Berlin (FRG)	Romania	5–0	Win
1985	World Group, First round	8–10 March	Sindelfingen (FRG)	Spain	3–2	Win
1985	World Group, Quarterfinals	2–4 August	Hamburg (FRG)	United States	3–2	Win
1985	World Group, Semifinals	4–6 October	Frankfurt (FRG)	Czechoslovakia	5–0	Win
1985	World Group, Finals	20–22 December	Munich (FRG)	Sweden	2–3	Runner-up
1986	World Group, First round	7–10 March	Mexico City (MEX)	Mexico	2–3	Loss
1986	World Group, Relegation play-off	3–5 October	Essen (FRG)	Ecuador	5–0	Win
1987	World Group, First round	13–15 March	Barcelona (ESP)	Spain	2–3	Loss
1987	World Group, Relegation play-off	24–26 July	Hartford (USA)	United States	3–2	Win
1988	World Group, First round	5–7 February	Essen (FRG)	Brazil	5–0	Win
1988	World Group, Quarterfinals	8–10 April	Frankfurt (FRG)	Denmark	5–0	Win
1988	World Group, Semifinals	22–24 July	Dortmund (FRG)	Yugoslavia	5–0	Win
1988	World Group, Finals	16–18 December	Gothenburg (SWE)	Sweden	4–1	Champion
1989	World Group, First round	3–5 February	Karlsruhe (FRG)	Indonesia	5–0	Win
1989	World Group, Quarterfinals	7–9 February	Prague (TCH)	Czechoslovakia	3–2	Win
1989	World Group, Semifinals	21–23 July	Munich (FRG)	United States	3–2	Win
1989	World Group, Finals	15–17 December	Stuttgart (FRG)	Sweden	3–2	Champion

==== 1990s ====
Year	Competition	Date	Location	Opponent	Score	Result
1990	World Group, First round	2–4 February	Bremen (FRG)	Netherlands	3–2	Win
1990	World Group, Quarterfinals	30 March–2 April	Buenos Aires (ARG)	Argentina	2–3	Loss
1991	World Group, First round	1–3 February	Dortmund (GER)	Italy	3–2	Win
1991	World Group, Quarterfinals	30 March–1 April	Berlin (GER)	Argentina	5–0	Win
1991	World Group, Semifinals	20–22 September	Kansas City (USA)	United States	2–3	Loss
1992	World Group, First round	31 January–2 February	Rio de Janeiro (BRA)	Brazil	1–3	Loss
1992	World Group, Qualifying round	25–27 September	Berlin (GER)	Belgium	5–0	Win
1993	World Group, First round	26–28 March	Moscow (RUS)	Russia	4–1	Win
1993	World Group, Quarterfinals	16–18 July	Halle (GER)	Czech Republic	4–1	Win
1993	World Group, Semifinals	24–26 September	Borlänge (SWE)	Sweden	5–0	Win
1993	World Group, Finals	3–5 December	Düsseldorf (GER)	Australia	4–1	Champion
1994	World Group, First round	25–27 March	Graz (AUT)	Austria	3–2	Win
1994	World Group, Quarterfinals	15–17 July	Halle (GER)	Spain	3–2	Win
1994	World Group, Semifinals	23–25 September	Hamburg (GER)	Russia	1–4	Loss
1995	World Group, First round	3–5 February	Karlsruhe (GER)	Croatia	4–1	Win
1995	World Group, Quarterfinals	31 March–2 April	Utrecht (NED)	Netherlands	4–1	Win
1995	World Group, Semifinals	22–24 September	Moscow (RUS)	Russia	2–3	Loss
1996	World Group, First round	9–11 February	Geneva (SUI)	Switzerland	5–0	Win
1996	World Group, Quarterfinals	5–7 April	Limoges (FRA)	France	0–5	Loss
1997	World Group, First round	7–9 February	Mallorca (ESP)	Spain	1–4	Loss
1997	World Group, Qualifying round	19–21 September	Essen (GER)	Mexico	5–0	Win
1998	World Group, First round	3–5 April	Bremen (GER)	South Africa	5–0	Win
1998	World Group, Quarterfinals	17–19 July	Hamburg (GER)	Sweden	2–3	Loss
1999	World Group, First round	2–4 April	Frankfurt (GER)	Russia	2–3	Loss
1999	World Group, Qualifying round	24–26 September	Bucharest (ROU)	Romania	4–1	Win

==== 2000s ====
Year	Competition	Date	Location	Opponent	Score	Result
2000	World Group, First round	4–6 February	Leipzig (GER)	Netherlands	4–1	Win
2000	World Group, Quarterfinals	7–8 April	Adelaide (AUS)	Australia	2–3	Loss
2001	World Group, First round	9–11 February	Braunschweig (GER)	Romania	3–2	Win
2001	World Group, Quarterfinals	6–8 April	's-Hertogenbosch (NED)	Netherlands	1–4	Loss
2002	World Group, First round	8–10 February	Zagreb (CRO)	Croatia	1–4	Loss
2002	World Group, Qualifying round	20–22 September	Karlsruhe (GER)	Venezuela	5–0	Win
2003	World Group, First round	7–9 February	Buenos Aires (ARG)	Argentina	0–5	Loss
2003	World Group, Qualifying round	19–21 September	Sundern (GER)	Belarus	2–3	Loss
2004	Europe/Africa Group I, 2nd round	9–11 April	Alsdorf (GER)	Israel	5–0	Win
2004	World Group, Play-off	24–26 September	Bratislava (SVK)	Slovakia	2–3	Loss
2005	Europe/Africa Group I, 2nd round	4–6 March	Doornfontein (RSA)	South Africa	3–2	Win
2005	World Group, Play-off	23–25 September	Liberec (CZE)	Czech Republic	3–2	Win
2006	World Group, First round	10–12 February	Halle (GER)	France	2–3	Loss
2006	World Group, Play-off	22–24 September	Düsseldorf (GER)	Thailand	4–1	Win
2007	World Group, First round	9–11 February	Krefeld (GER)	Croatia	3–2	Win
2007	World Group, Quarterfinals	6–8 April	Ostend (BEL)	Belgium	3–2	Win
2007	World Group, Semifinals	21–23 September	Moscow (RUS)	Russia	2–3	Loss
2008	World Group, First round	8–10 February	Braunschweig (GER)	South Korea	3–2	Win
2008	World Group, Quarterfinals	11–13 April	Bremen (GER)	Spain	1–4	Loss
2009	World Group, First round	6–8 March	Garmisch-Partenkirchen (GER)	Austria	3–2	Win
2009	World Group, Quarterfinals	10–12 July	Marbella (ESP)	Spain	2–3	Loss

==== 2010s ====
Year	Competition	Date	Location	Opponent	Score	Result
2010	World Group, First round	5–7 March	Toulon (FRA)	France	1–4	Loss
2010	World Group play-offs	17–19 September	Stuttgart (GER)	South Africa	5–0	Win
2011	World Group, First round	4–6 March	Zagreb (CRO)	Croatia [8]	3–2	Win
2011	World Group, Quarterfinals	8–10 July	Stuttgart (GER)	France [2]	1–4	Loss
2012	World Group, First round	10–12 February	Bamberg (GER)	Argentina [2]	1–4	Loss
2012	World Group play-offs	14–16 September	Hamburg (GER)	Australia	3–2	Win
2013	World Group, First round	1–3 February	Buenos Aires (ARG)	Argentina [3]	0–5	Loss
2013	World Group play-offs	13–15 September	Neu-Ulm (GER)	Brazil	4–1	Win
2014	World Group, First round	31 January–2 February	Frankfurt (GER)	Spain [3]	4–1	Win
2014	World Group, Quarterfinals	29–31 March	Nancy (FRA)	France [5]	2–3	Loss
2015	World Group, First round	6–8 March	Frankfurt (GER)	France [1]	2–3	Loss
2015	World Group play-offs	18–20 September	Santo Domingo (DOM)	Dominican Republic	4–1	Win
2016	World Group, First round	4–6 March	Hanover (GER)	Czech Republic [3]	2–3	Loss
2016	World Group play-offs	16–18 September	Berlin (GER)	Poland	3–2	Win
2017	World Group, First round	3–5 February	Frankfurt (GER)	Belgium [7]	1–4	Loss
2017	World Group play-offs	15–17 September	Oeiras (POR)	Portugal	3–2	Win
2018	World Group, First round	2–4 February	Brisbane (AUS)	Australia [6]	3–1	Win
2018	World Group, Quarterfinals	6–8 April	Valencia (ESP)	Spain	2–3	Loss
2019	Qualifying round	1–2 February	Frankfurt (GER)	Hungary	5–0	Win
2019	Finals, Group C	20 November	Madrid (ESP)	Argentina [3]	3–0	Win
2019	Finals, Group C	21 November	Madrid (ESP)	Chile	2–1	Win
2019	Finals, Quarterfinals	22 November	Madrid (ESP)	Great Britain [5]	0–2	Loss

==== 2020s ====
Year	Competition	Date	Location	Opponent	Score	Result
2020	Qualifying round	6–7 March	Düsseldorf (GER)	Belarus	4–1	Win
2021	Finals, Group F	27 November	Innsbruck (AUT)	Serbia [6]	2–1	Win
2021	Finals, Group F	28 November	Innsbruck (AUT)	Austria	2–1	Win
2021	Finals, Quarterfinals	30 November	Innsbruck (AUT)	Great Britain	2–1	Win
2021	Finals, Semifinals	4 December	Madrid (ESP)	Russia	1–2	Loss
2022	Qualifying round	4–5 March	Rio de Janeiro (BRA)	Brazil	3–1	Win
2022	Finals, Group C	14 September	Hamburg (GER)	France	2–1	Win
2022	Finals, Group C	16 September	Hamburg (GER)	Belgium	2–1	Win
2022	Finals, Group C	18 September	Hamburg (GER)	Australia	2–1	Win
2022	Finals, Quarterfinals	24 November	Málaga (ESP)	Canada	1–2	Loss
2023	Qualifying round	3–4 February	Trier (GER)	Switzerland	2–3	Loss
2023	World Group I	16–17 September	Mostar (BIH)	Bosnia and Herzegovina	4–0	Win
2024	Qualifying round	2–3 February	Tatabánya (HUN)	Hungary	3–2	Win
2024	Finals, Group C	10 September	Zhuhai (CHN)	Slovakia	3–0	Win
2024	Finals, Group C	12 September	Zhuhai (CHN)	Chile	3–0	Win
2024	Finals, Group C	14 September	Zhuhai (CHN)	United States	1–2	Loss
2024	Finals, Quarterfinals	20 November	Málaga (ESP)	Canada	2–0	Win
2024	Finals, Semifinals	22 November	Málaga (ESP)	Netherlands	0–2	Loss
2025	Qualifiers first round	31 January–1 February	Vilnius (LTU)	Israel	3–1	Win
2025	Qualifiers second round	12–13 September	Tokyo (JPN)	Japan	4–0	Win
2025	Finals, Quarterfinals	20 November	Bologna (ITA)	Argentina	2–1	Win
2025	Finals, Semifinals	22 November	Bologna (ITA)	Spain	1–2	Loss
2026	Qualifiers first round	6–7 February	Düsseldorf (GER)	Peru	4–0	Win
2026	Qualifiers second round	19–20 September	Halle (GER)	Croatia	3–1	Win
2026	Finals, Quarterfinals	26 November	Bologna (ITA)	Great Britain	–	Pending

== Statistics ==
=== Player records ===
Most total wins overall
#	Player	First year	Last year	Win–loss			Win %	Ties played	Years played
#	Player	First year	Last year	Singles	Doubles	Total	Win %	Ties played	Years played
1	Gottfried von Cramm	1932	1953	58–10	24–9	**82**–19	81%	37	9
2	Wilhelm Bungert	1958	1971	52–27	14–9	**66**–36	65%	43	14
3	Boris Becker	1985	1999	38–3	16–9	**54**–12	82%	28	12
4	Christian Kuhnke	1960	1972	35–15	16–8	**51**–23	69%	32	10
5	Henner Henkel	1935	1939	33–13	16–4	**49**–17	74%	27	5
6	Ingo Buding	1961	1970	26–11	10–5	**36**–16	69%	26	9
7	Michael Stich	1990	1996	21–9	14–2	**35**–11	76%	17	7
8	Philipp Kohlschreiber	2007	2020	20–14	4–3	**24**–17	59%	23	13
9	**Tim Pütz**	2017	2026	0–0	23–2	**23**–2	92%	25	9
9	Tommy Haas	1998	2014	19–7	4–2	**23**–9	72%	18	11

Most total wins since 1981
#	Player	First year	Last year	Win–loss			Win %	Ties played	Years played
#	Player	First year	Last year	Singles	Doubles	Total	Win %	Ties played	Years played
1	Boris Becker	1985	1999	38–3	16–9	**54**–12	82%	28	12
2	Michael Stich	1990	1996	21–9	14–2	**35**–11	76%	17	7
3	Philipp Kohlschreiber	2007	2020	20–14	4–3	**24**–17	59%	23	13
4	**Tim Pütz**	2017	2026	0–0	23–2	**23**–2	92%	25	9
4	Tommy Haas	1998	2014	19–7	4–2	**23**–9	72%	18	11
6	**Kevin Krawietz**	2019	2026	0–1	21–2	**21**–3	88%	23	7
6	**Jan-Lennard Struff**	2015	2026	17–12	4–0	**21**–12	64%	26	10
8	Eric Jelen	1986	1992	8–4	12–4	**20**–8	71%	16	7
9	**Alexander Zverev**	2016	2026	13–5	0–1	**13**–6	68%	10	8
10	Michael Westphal	1982	1986	12–7	0–0	**12**–7	63%	10	5
10	Marc-Kevin Goellner	1993	2001	8–6	4–3	**12**–9	57%	12	7
10	Nicolas Kiefer	1998	2009	10–11	2–3	**12**–14	46%	15	10

- As of 2026 Davis Cup Qualifiers second round. Players who are still active are shown in boldface.

=== Team records ===
Statistics since 1981, as of 2026 Davis Cup Qualifiers second round.

Results

- Champion: 3 times
- Runner-up: 1 time
- Lost in semifinals: 7 times
- Lost in quarterfinals: 12 times
- Lost in first round: 17 times
- Lost in qualifying round: 1 time
- Not in World Group: 3 times

Records by decade

- 1981–1989: 18–7 (72%)
- 1990–1999: 16–9 (64%)
- 2000–2009: 11–10 (52%)
- 2010–2019: 12–10 (55%)
- 2020–: 18–6 (75%)

Records by ground

- Home (56 ties): 42–15 (74%)
- Away (46 ties): 25–21 (53%)
- Neutral (14 ties): 8–6 (57%)
- **Total: (116 ties): 75–42 (64%)**

=== Head-to-head records ===
Statistics since 1981, as of 2026 Davis Cup Qualifiers second round.

Records against countries

Team	Ties	Won	Lost	Win%
Argentina	10	3	7	30%
Australia	5	4	1	80%
Austria	3	3	0	100%
Belarus	2	1	1	50%
Belgium	5	4	1	80%
Bosnia and Herzegovina	1	1	0	100%
Brazil	5	4	1	80%
Canada	2	1	1	50%
Chile	2	2	0	100%
Croatia	5	4	1	80%
Czech Republic (Note: includes Czechoslovakia (2–1))	6	4	2	67%
Denmark	1	1	0	100%
Dominican Republic	1	1	0	100%
Ecuador	1	1	0	100%
France	7	1	6	14%
Great Britain	2	1	1	50%
Hungary	2	2	0	100%
Indonesia	1	1	0	100%
Israel	3	3	0	100%
Italy	1	1	0	100%
Japan	1	1	0	100%
Mexico	2	1	1	50%
Netherlands	5	3	2	60%
Peru	1	1	0	100%
Poland	1	1	0	100%
Portugal	1	1	0	100%
Romania	3	3	0	100%
Russia	6	1	5	17%
Serbia	1	1	0	100%
Slovakia	2	1	1	50%
South Africa	3	3	0	100%
South Korea	1	1	0	100%
Spain	9	3	6	33%
Sweden	5	3	2	60%
Switzerland	3	2	1	67%
Thailand	1	1	0	100%
United States	5	3	2	60%
Venezuela	1	1	0	100%
Yugoslavia	1	1	0	100%
Total (39)	117	75	42	64%

Records against Davis Cup zones

Africa	Asia / Oceania
South Africa	Australia; Indonesia; Japan; South Korea; Thailand
3–0 (100%)	8–1 (89%)
Americas	Europe
Argentina; Brazil; Canada; Chile; Dominican Republic; Ecuador; Mexico; Peru; United States; Venezuela	Austria; Belarus; Belgium; Bosnia and Herzegovina; Croatia; Czech Republic; Denmark; France; Great Britain; Hungary; Israel; Italy; Netherlands; Poland; Portugal; Romania; Russia; Serbia; Slovakia; Spain; Sweden; Switzerland; Yugoslavia
18–12 (60%)	46–29 (61%)

== See also ==
- List of Germany Davis Cup team representatives
- Davis Cup
- Germany Billie Jean King Cup team
- Germany at the Hopman Cup
- German Tennis Federation
- Tennis in Germany
