= 1995 Davis Cup World Group qualifying round =

Tennis matches

The 1995 Davis Cup World Group qualifying round was held from 22 to 24 September. They were the main play-offs of the 1995 Davis Cup. The winners of the playoffs advanced to the 1996 Davis Cup World Group, and the losers were relegated to their respective Zonal Regions I.

== Teams ==
Bold indicates team had qualified for the 1996 Davis Cup World Group.

From World Group

- Australia
- **Belgium**
- Croatia
- **Czech Republic**
- **Denmark**
- **France**
- Spain
- **Switzerland**

From Americas Group I

- **Mexico**
- Venezuela

From Asia/Oceania Group I

- **India**
- New Zealand

From Europe/Africa Group I

- **Hungary**
- Morocco
- Norway
- Zimbabwe

== Results summary ==
Date: 22–24 September

The eight losing teams in the World Group first round ties and eight winners of the Zonal Group I final round ties competed in the World Group qualifying round for spots in the 1996 World Group.

Home team	Score	Visiting team	Location	Venue	Door	Surface	Ref.
**Hungary**	3–2	Australia	Budapest	Kisstadion	Outdoor	Clay	
Norway	0–5	**Belgium**	Oslo	Riksanlegget	Indoor	Hard	
**India**	3–2	Croatia	New Delhi	National Sports Club	Outdoor	Grass	
**Czech Republic**	4–1	Zimbabwe	Prague	National Centre	Outdoor	Clay	
Venezuela	2–3	**Denmark**	Caracas	National Centre	Outdoor	Clay	
**Mexico**	3–2	Spain	Mexico City	Club Alemán de México	Outdoor	Hard	
Morocco	0–5	**France**	Casablanca	Complexe Al Amal	Outdoor	Clay	
New Zealand	1–4	**Switzerland**	Hamilton	Mystery Creek Pavilion	Outdoor	Hard	

- Belgium, Czech Republic, Denmark, France and Switzerland remain in the World Group in 1996.
- Hungary, India and Mexico are promoted to the World Group in 1996.
- Morocco, New Zealand, Norway, Venezuela and Zimbabwe remain in Zonal Group I in 1996.
- Australia, Croatia and Spain are relegated to Zonal Group I in 1996.

== Qualifying results ==
=== Hungary vs. Australia ===
Hungary
3
Kisstadion, Budapest, Hungary
22–24 September 1995
Clay

Australia
2

			1	2	3	4	5
1	(Hungary) (Australia)	Sándor Noszály; **Mark Philippoussis**	1; **6**	2; **6**	3; **6**
2	(Hungary) (Australia)	**József Krocskó**; Todd Woodbridge	5; **7**	**6**; 2	**6**; 3	**6**; 1
3	(Hungary) (Australia)	Gábor Köves / László Markovits; **Todd Woodbridge / Mark Woodforde**	**6**; 1	**7^{9}** 6^{7}	0; **6**	3; **6**	2; **6**
4	(Hungary) (Australia)	**Sándor Noszály**; Todd Woodbridge	6^{4} **7^{7}**	**6**; 3	1; **6**	**6**; 2	**7**; 5
5	(Hungary) (Australia)	**József Krocskó**; Mark Philippoussis	**6**; 4	**6**; 4	3; **6**	**6**; 3

=== Norway vs. Belgium ===
Norway
0
Riksanlegget, Oslo, Norway
22–24 September 1995
Hard (indoors)

Belgium
5

			1	2	3	4	5
1	(Norway) (Belgium)	Helge Koll-Frafjord; **Johan Van Herck**	3; **6**	1; **6**	2; **6**
2	(Norway) (Belgium)	Christian Ruud; **Dick Norman**	6^{5} **7^{7}**	4; **6**	3; **6**
3	(Norway) (Belgium)	Bent-Ove Pedersen / Christian Ruud; **Filip Dewulf / Dick Norman**	6^{6} **7^{8}**	1; **6**	4; **6**
4	(Norway) (Belgium)	Christian Ruud; **Johan Van Herck**	**6**; 3	1; **6**	4; **6**
5	(Norway) (Belgium)	Helge Koll-Frafjord; **Dick Norman**	6^{5} **7^{7}**	6^{3} **7^{7}**

=== India vs. Croatia ===
India
3
National Sports Club, New Delhi, India
22–24 September 1995
Grass

Croatia
2

			1	2	3	4	5
1	(India) (Croatia)	**Leander Paes**; Saša Hiršzon	**6**; 3	**6**; 3	**6**; 4
2	(India) (Croatia)	Mahesh Bhupathi; **Goran Ivanišević**	4; **6**	4; **6**	4; **6**
3	(India) (Croatia)	**Mahesh Bhupathi / Leander Paes**; Saša Hiršzon / Goran Ivanišević	4; **6**	**7**; 5	**6**; 3	**7^{7}** 6^{3}
4	(India) (Croatia)	**Leander Paes**; Goran Ivanišević	6^{4} **7^{7}**	4; **6**	**7^{7}** 6^{3}	**6**; 4	**6**; 1
5	(India) (Croatia)	Mahesh Bhupathi; **Saša Hiršzon**	6^{4} **7^{7}**	**6**; 3	4; **6**

=== Czech Republic vs. Zimbabwe ===
Czech Republic
4
National Centre, Prague, Czech Republic
22–24 September 1995
Clay

Zimbabwe
1

			1	2	3	4	5
1	(Czech Republic) (Zimbabwe)	**Petr Korda**; Wayne Black	4; **6**	**7**; 5	**6**; 3	2; **6**	**6**; 4
2	(Czech Republic) (Zimbabwe)	**Bohdan Ulihrach**; Byron Black	**6**; 3	**6**; 4	**6**; 1
3	(Czech Republic) (Zimbabwe)	Cyril Suk / Daniel Vacek; **Byron Black / Wayne Black**	**6**; 1	3; **6**	**6**; 3	2; **6**	6; **8**
4	(Czech Republic) (Zimbabwe)	**Petr Korda**; Byron Black	**7^{11}** 6^{9}	5; **7**	**6**; 4	**7**; 5
5	(Czech Republic) (Zimbabwe)	**Bohdan Ulihrach**; Wayne Black	**7**; 5	**6**; 1

=== Venezuela vs. Denmark ===
Venezuela
2
National Centre, Caracas, Venezuela
22–24 September 1995
Clay

Denmark
3

			1	2	3	4	5
1	(Venezuela) (Denmark)	Maurice Ruah; **Kenneth Carlsen**	3; **6**	**6**; 3	3; **6**	2; **6**
2	(Venezuela) (Denmark)	**Nicolás Pereira**; Frederik Fetterlein	**6**; 2	**6**; 2	**7^{7}** 6^{1}
3	(Venezuela) (Denmark)	**Nicolás Pereira / Maurice Ruah**; Kenneth Carlsen / Morten Christensen	**6**; 4	**7^{8}** 6^{6}	6^{4} **7^{7}**	**6**; 4
4	(Venezuela) (Denmark)	Nicolás Pereira; **Kenneth Carlsen**	6^{3} **7^{7}**	2; **6**	**6**; 3	5; **7**
5	(Venezuela) (Denmark)	Maurice Ruah; **Frederik Fetterlein**	1; **6**	2; **6**	2; **6**

=== Mexico vs. Spain ===
Mexico
3
Club Alemán de México, Mexico City, Mexico
22–24 September 1995
Hard

Spain
2

			1	2	3	4	5
1	(Mexico) (Spain)	Luis Herrera; **Sergi Bruguera**	3; **6**	**6**; 4	**6**; 3	1; **6**	2; **6**
2	(Mexico) (Spain)	**Leonardo Lavalle**; Alberto Berasategui	**7^{8}** 6^{6}	**7^{7}** 6^{2}	**6**; 3
3	(Mexico) (Spain)	**Leonardo Lavalle / Jorge Lozano**; Sergio Casal / Emilio Sánchez	**6**; 2	3; **6**	**7^{7}** 6^{5}	1; **6**	**6**; 4
4	(Mexico) (Spain)	Leonardo Lavalle; **Sergi Bruguera**	3; **6**	**7^{7}** 6^{2}	**6**; 1	2; **6**	4; **6**
5	(Mexico) (Spain)	**Luis Herrera**; Alberto Berasategui	**6**; 4	**6**; 1	**6**; 1

=== Morocco vs. France ===
Morocco
0
Complexe Al Amal, Casablanca, Morocco
22–24 September 1995
Clay

France
5

			1	2	3	4	5
1	(Morocco) (France)	Karim Alami; **Cédric Pioline**	6^{5} **7^{7}**	**6**; 1	6^{5} **7^{7}**	4; **6**
2	(Morocco) (France)	Younes El Aynaoui; **Arnaud Boetsch**	**7**; 5	**7**; 5	5; **7**	4; **6**	0; **6**
3	(Morocco) (France)	Hicham Arazi / Younes El Aynaoui; **Arnaud Boetsch / Guy Forget**	3; **6**	2; **6**	2; **6**
4	(Morocco) (France)	Hicham Arazi; **Jérôme Golmard**	6^{4} **7^{7}**	**7^{7}** 6^{2}	4; **6**
5	(Morocco) (France)	Younes El Aynaoui; **Cédric Pioline**	4; **6**	4; **6**

=== New Zealand vs. Switzerland ===
New Zealand
1
Mystery Creek Pavilion, Hamilton, New Zealand
22–24 September 1995
Hard

Switzerland
4

			1	2	3	4	5
1	(New Zealand) (Switzerland)	Brett Steven; **Jakob Hlasek**	6^{2} **7^{7}**	4; **6**	4; **6**
2	(New Zealand) (Switzerland)	Steven Downs; **Marc Rosset**	2; **6**	4; **6**	1; **6**
3	(New Zealand) (Switzerland)	Steven Downs / Alistair Hunt; **Jakob Hlasek / Marc Rosset**	6^{5} **7^{7}**	1; **6**	1; **6**
4	(New Zealand) (Switzerland)	Alistair Hunt; **Marc Rosset**	2; **6**	2; **6**
5	(New Zealand) (Switzerland)	**Steven Downs**; Jakob Hlasek	**6**; 3	**6**; 4
