= Czech Republic Davis Cup team =

Davis Cup team representing the Czech Republic

Czech Republic
- Other names: Czechia
- Captain: Tomáš Berdych
- Nations Ranking: 5 (21 September 2026)
- Highest ranking: 1 (8 April 2013)
- Colors: blue & red
- First year: 1993
- Years played: 90
- Ties played (W–L): 226 (137–89)
- Years in World Group: 42 (44–42)
- Davis Cup titles: 2 (2012, 2013)
- Runners-up: 1 (2009)
- Most total wins: Jan Kodeš (60–34)
- Most singles wins: Roderich Menzel (40–12)
- Most doubles wins: Jan Kodeš (21–15) Tomáš Berdych (21-2)
- Best doubles team: Tomáš Berdych & Radek Štěpánek (16–2)
- Most ties played: Jan Kodeš (39)
- Most years played: Jan Kodeš (15)

The Czech Republic men's national tennis team represents the Czech Republic in the Davis Cup and is governed by the Czech Tennis Federation. The Czech team was started in 1993, following the break-up of Czechoslovakia. The team competed in the Europe/Africa Zone I in 2019. It has played in the World Group in all but one year since it was created in 1981, sharing this record with the United States.

== History ==
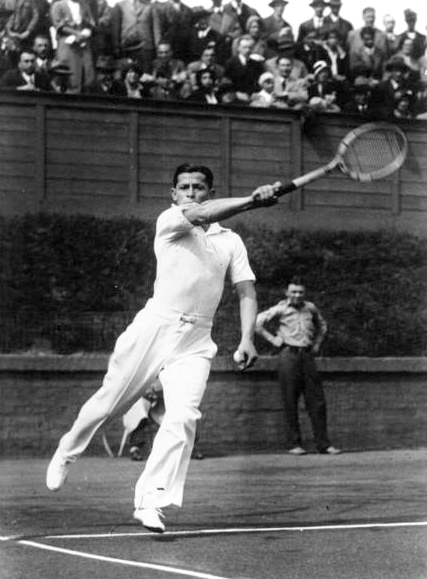
Ladislav Hecht

The Czech Republic competed in its first Davis Cup in 1921, as Czechoslovakia.

From 1930 to 1939 Ladislav Hecht played for the Czech Republic Davis Cup team, achieving a record of 18-19, and was its Captain. Hecht was invited to play for the German Davis Cup Team in 1938, by an aide to Adolf Hitler who was unaware that he was Jewish, but declined.

The Czech Republic won the Davis Cup in 1980 as Czechoslovakia, and in 2012 and 2013 as the Czech Republic in Prague and Belgrade respectively.

== Results and fixtures ==
The following are lists of match results and scheduled matches for the current year.

Win Loss Fixture

=== 2026 ===
2026 Davis Cup Qualifiers first round

Czech Republic
3
Horácká aréna, Jihlava, Czech Republic
7–8 February 2026
Hard (i)

Sweden
1

| | | | 1 | 2 | 3 |
|---|---|---|---|---|---|---|
| 1 | (Czech Republic) (Sweden) | Jiří Lehečka; Dragoș Nicolae Mădăraș | 6; 3 | 6; 4 |
| 2 | (Czech Republic) (Sweden) | Dalibor Svrčina; Olle Wallin | 6; 1 | 6; 3 |
| 3 | (Czech Republic) (Sweden) | Petr Nouza / Patrik Rikl; André Göransson / Erik Grevelius | 7^{7} 6^{4} | 6^{4} 7^{7} | 7^{7} 6^{4} |
| 4 | (Czech Republic) (Sweden) | Maxim Mrva; Olle Wallin | 4; 6 | 6^{1} 7^{7} |
| 5 | (Czech Republic) (Sweden) | Dalibor Svrčina; Dragoș Nicolae Mădăraș | | | | not played |

2026 Davis Cup Qualifiers second round

Czech Republic
3
O_{2} arena, Prague, Czech Republic
18–19 September
Hard (i)

United States
2

| | | | 1 | 2 | 3 |
|---|---|---|---|---|---|
| 1 | (Czech Republic) (United States) | Jakub Menšík; Learner Tien | 2; 6 | 4; 6 |
| 2 | (Czech Republic) (United States) | Jiří Lehečka; Ben Shelton | 6; 4 | 6; 4 |
| 3 | (Czech Republic) (United States) | Adam Pavlásek / Patrik Rikl; Christian Harrison / Austin Krajicek | 7; 5 | 3; 6 | 6^{8} 7^{10} |
| 4 | (Czech Republic) (United States) | Jakub Menšík; Ben Shelton | 5; 7 | 6; 4 | 6; 3 |
| 5 | (Czech Republic) (United States) | Jiří Lehečka; Learner Tien | 6; 3 | 7; 5 |

Quarterfinals

Czech Republic

SuperTennis Arena Bologna Fiera, Bologna, Italy
24–29 November
Hard (i)

Canada

| | | 1 | 2 | 3 |
|---|---|---|---|---|
| 1 | (Czech Republic) (Canada) |
| 2 | (Czech Republic) (Canada) |
| 3 | (Czech Republic) (Canada) |
| 4 | (Czech Republic) (Canada) |
| 5 | (Czech Republic) (Canada) |

== Current team (2026) ==
- Jiří Lehečka
- Vít Kopřiva
- Jakub Menšík
- Maxim Mrva
- Petr Nouza
- Adam Pavlásek
- Patrik Rikl
- Dalibor Svrčina

== Historical results ==
Here is the list of all match-ups since 1981, when the competition started being held in the current World Group format.

=== 1980s ===
| Year | Competition | Date | Location | Opponent | Score | Result |
|---|---|---|---|---|---|---|
As Czechoslovakia
| 1981 | World Group, 1st Round | 6–8 Mar | Zurich (SUI) | Switzerland | 3–2 | Win |
| 1981 | World Group, Quarterfinals | 9–11 Jul | New York City (USA) | United States | 1–4 | Loss |
| 1982 | World Group, 1st Round | 5–7 Mar | Prague (TCH) | West Germany | 5–0 | Win |
| 1982 | World Group, Quarterfinals | 9–11 Jul | Paris (FRA) | France | 2–3 | Loss |
| 1983 | World Group, 1st Round | 4–6 Mar | Asunción (PAR) | Paraguay | 2–3 | Loss |
| 1983 | World Group, relegation play-offs | 30 Sep – 2 Oct | Hradec Králové (TCH) | Soviet Union | 3–2 | Win |
| 1984 | World Group, 1st Round | 24–26 Feb | Hradec Králové (TCH) | Denmark | 5–0 | Win |
| 1984 | World Group, Quarterfinals | 13–15 Jul | Hradec Králové (TCH) | France | 3–2 | Win |
| 1984 | World Group, Semifinals | 28–30 Sep | Båstad (SWE) | Sweden | 0–5 | Loss |
| 1985 | World Group, 1st Round | 8–10 Mar | Tbilisi (URS) | Soviet Union | 3–2 | Win |
| 1985 | World Group, Quarterfinals | 2–4 Aug | Guayaquil (ECU) | Ecuador | 5–0 | Win |
| 1985 | World Group, Semifinals | 4–6 Oct | Frankfurt (FRG) | West Germany | 0–5 | Loss |
| 1986 | World Group, 1st Round | 7–10 Mar | Calcutta (IND) | India | 4–1 | Win |
| 1986 | World Group, Quarterfinals | 18–20 Jul | Sarajevo (YUG) | Yugoslavia | 5–0 | Win |
| 1986 | World Group, Semifinals | 3–5 Oct | Prague (TCH) | Sweden | 1–4 | Loss |
| 1987 | World Group, 1st Round | 13–15 Mar | Hradec Králové (TCH) | Israel | 2–3 | Loss |
| 1987 | World Group, relegation play-offs | 24–26 Jul | Prague (TCH) | Argentina | 5–0 | Win |
| 1988 | World Group, 1st Round | 5–7 Feb | Prague (TCH) | Paraguay | 5–0 | Win |
| 1988 | World Group, Quarterfinals | 8–10 Apr | Norrköping (SWE) | Sweden | 2–3 | Loss |
| 1989 | World Group, 1st Round | 3–5 Feb | Prague (TCH) | Soviet Union | 4–1 | Win |
| 1989 | World Group, Quarterfinals | 7–9 Apr | Prague (TCH) | West Germany | 2–3 | Loss |

=== 1990s ===
| Year | Competition | Date | Location | Opponent | Score | Result |
|---|---|---|---|---|---|---|
As Czechoslovakia
| 1990 | World Group, 1st Round | 2–4 Feb | Prague (TCH) | Switzerland | 5–0 | Win |
| 1990 | World Group, Quarterfinals | 30 Mar – 2 Apr | Prague (TCH) | United States | 1–4 | Loss |
| 1991 | World Group, 1st Round | 2–4 Feb | Prague (TCH) | Austria | 4–1 | Win |
| 1991 | World Group, Quarterfinals | 29–31 Mar | Prague (TCH) | Yugoslavia | 1–4 | Loss |
| 1992 | World Group, 1st Round | 31 Jan – 2 Feb | Prague (TCH) | Belgium | 5–0 | Win |
| 1992 | World Group, Quarterfinals | 27–29 Mar | Fort Myers (USA) | United States | 2–3 | Loss |
As Czech Republic
| 1993 | World Group, 1st Round | 26–28 Mar | Aarhus (DEN) | Denmark | 4–1 | Win |
| 1993 | World Group, Quarterfinals | 16–18 Jul | Halle (GER) | Germany | 1–4 | Loss |
| 1994 | World Group, 1st Round | 25–27 Mar | Ramat HaSharon (ISR) | Israel | 4–1 | Win |
| 1994 | World Group, Quarterfinals | 15–17 Jul | Saint Petersburg (RUS) | Russia | 2–3 | Loss |
| 1995 | World Group, 1st Round | 3–5 Feb | Naples (ITA) | Italy | 1–4 | Loss |
| 1995 | World Group, qualifying round | 22–24 Sep | Prague (CZE) | Zimbabwe | 4–1 | Win |
| 1996 | World Group, 1st Round | 9–11 Feb | Plzeň (CZE) | Hungary | 5–0 | Win |
| 1996 | World Group, Quarterfinals | 5–7 Apr | Prague (CZE) | United States | 3–2 | Win |
| 1996 | World Group, Semifinals | 20–22 Sep | Prague (CZE) | Sweden | 1–4 | Loss |
| 1997 | World Group, 1st Round | 7–9 Feb | Příbram (CZE) | India | 3–2 | Win |
| 1997 | World Group, Quarterfinals | 4–6 Apr | Adelaide (AUS) | Australia | 0–5 | Loss |
| 1998 | World Group, 1st Round | 3–5 Apr | Zurich (SUI) | Switzerland | 2–3 | Loss |
| 1998 | World Group, qualifying round | 25–27 Sep | Prague (SUI) | South Africa | 5–0 | Win |
| 1999 | World Group, 1st Round | 2–4 Apr | Ghent (BEL) | Belgium | 2–3 | Loss |
| 1999 | World Group, qualifying round | 24–26 Sep | Tashkent (UZB) | Uzbekistan | 5–0 | Win |

=== 2000s ===
| Year | Competition | Date | Location | Opponent | Score | Result |
|---|---|---|---|---|---|---|
| 2000 | World Group, 1st Round | 4–6 Feb | Ostrava (TCH) | Great Britain | 4–1 | Win |
| 2000 | World Group, Quarterfinals | 7–9 Apr | Inglewood (USA) | United States | 2–3 | Loss |
| 2001 | World Group, 1st Round | 9–11 Feb | Helsingborg (SWE) | Sweden | 2–3 | Loss |
| 2001 | World Group, qualifying round | 21–23 Sep | Prostějov (CZE) | Romania | 3–2 | Win |
| 2002 | World Group, 1st Round | 8–10 Feb | Ostrava (CZE) | Brazil | 4–1 | Win |
| 2002 | World Group, Quarterfinals | 5–7 Apr | Pau (FRA) | France | 2–3 | Loss |
| 2003 | World Group, 1st Round | 7–9 Feb | Ostrava (CZE) | Russia | 2–3 | Loss |
| 2003 | World Group, relegation play-offs | 19–21 Sep | Bangkok (THA) | Thailand | 4–1 | Win |
| 2004 | World Group, 1st Round | 6–8 Feb | Brno (CZE) | Spain | 2–3 | Loss |
| 2004 | World Group, relegation play-offs | 24–26 Sep | Lambaré (PAR) | Paraguay | 5–0 | Win |
| 2005 | World Group, 1st Round | 4–6 Mar | Buenos Aires (ARG) | Argentina | 0–5 | Loss |
| 2005 | World Group, relegation play-offs | 23-25 Sep | Liberec (CZE) | Germany | 2–3 | Loss |
| 2006 | Europe/Africa Zone Group I, 1st Round | BYE | | | | |
| 2006 | Europe/Africa Zone Group I, 2nd Round | 7–9 Apr | Oujda (MAR) | Morocco | 5–0 | Win |
| 2006 | World Group, relegation play-offs | 22–24 Sep | Leiden (NED) | Netherlands | 4–1 | Win |
| 2007 | World Group, 1st Round | 9–11 Feb | Ostrava (CZE) | United States | 1–4 | Loss |
| 2007 | World Group, relegation play-offs | 21–23 Sep | Prague (CZE) | Switzerland | 3–2 | Win |
| 2008 | World Group, 1st Round | 8–10 Feb | Ostrava (CZE) | Belgium | 3–2 | Win |
| 2008 | World Group, Quarterfinals | 11–13 Apr | Moscow (RUS) | Russia | 2–3 | Loss |
| 2009 | World Group, 1st Round | 6–8 Mar | Ostrava (CZE) | France | 3–2 | Win |
| 2009 | World Group, Quarterfinals | 10–12 Jul | Ostrava (CZE) | Argentina | 3–2 | Win |
| 2009 | World Group, Semifinals | 18–20 Sep | Poreč (CRO) | Croatia | 4–1 | Win |
| 2009 | World Group, Finals | 4–6 Dec | Barcelona (ESP) | Spain | 0–5 | Runner-up |

=== 2010s ===
| Year | Competition | Date | Location | Opponent | Score | Result |
|---|---|---|---|---|---|---|
| 2010 | World Group, 1st Round | 5–7 Mar | Bree (BEL) | Belgium | 4–1 | Win |
| 2010 | World Group, Quarterfinals | 9–11 Jul | Coquimbo (CHI) | Chile | 4–1 | Win |
| 2010 | World Group, Semifinals | 17–19 Sep | Belgrade (SRB) | Serbia | 2–3 | Loss |
| 2011 | World Group, 1st Round | 4–6 Mar | Ostrava (CZE) | Kazakhstan | 2–3 | Loss |
| 2011 | World Group, relegation play-offs | 16–18 Sep | Bucharest (ROU) | Romania | 5–0 | Win |
| 2012 | World Group, 1st Round | 10–12 Feb | Ostrava (CZE) | Italy | 4–1 | Win |
| 2012 | World Group, Quarterfinals | 6–8 Apr | Prague (CZE) | Serbia | 4–1 | Win |
| 2012 | World Group, Semifinals | 14–16 Sep | Buenos Aires (ARG) | Argentina | 3–2 | Win |
| 2012 | World Group, Finals | 16–18 Nov | Prague (CZE) | Spain | 3–2 | Champion |
| 2013 | World Group, 1st Round | 1–3 Feb | Geneva (SUI) | Switzerland | 3-2 | Win |
| 2013 | World Group, Quarterfinals | 5–7 Apr | Astana (KAZ) | Kazakhstan | 3–1 | Win |
| 2013 | World Group, Semifinals | 13–15 Sep | Prague (CZE) | Argentina | 3–2 | Win |
| 2013 | World Group, Finals | 15–17 Nov | Belgrade (SRB) | Serbia | 3–2 | Champion |
| 2014 | World Group, 1st Round | 31 Jan–2 Feb | Ostrava (CZE) | Netherlands | 3-2 | Win |
| 2014 | World Group, Quarterfinals | 4–6 Apr | Tokyo (JPN) | Japan | 5–0 | Win |
| 2014 | World Group, Semifinals | 12–14 Sep | Paris (FRA) | France | 1–4 | Loss |
| 2015 | World Group, 1st Round | 6–8 Mar | Ostrava (CZE) | Australia | 2–3 | Loss |
| 2015 | World Group, relegation play-offs | 18–20 Sep | New Delhi (IND) | India | 3–1 | Win |
| 2016 | World Group, 1st Round | 4–6 Mar | Hanover (GER) | Germany | 3–2 | Win |
| 2016 | World Group, Quarterfinals | 15–17 Jul | Třinec (CZE) | France | 1–3 | Loss |
| 2017 | World Group, 1st Round | 3–5 Feb | Melbourne (AUS) | Australia | 1–4 | Loss |
| 2017 | World Group, relegation play-offs | 15–17 Sep | The Hague (NED) | Netherlands | 2-3 | Loss |
| 2018 | Europe/Africa Zone Group I, 2nd Round | 6–7 Apr | Ostrava (CZE) | Israel | 3–1 | Win |
| 2018 | World Group play-offs | 14–16 Sep | Budapest (HUN) | Hungary | 3–2 | Win |
| 2019 | Qualifying round | 1–2 Feb | Ostrava (CZE) | Netherlands | 1–3 | Loss |
| 2019 | Europe/Africa Zone Group I | 14–15 Sep | Zenica (BIH) | Bosnia and Herzegovina | 3–2 | Win |

=== 2020s ===
| Year | Competition | Date | Location | Opponent | Score | Result |
|---|---|---|---|---|---|---|
| 2020–21 | Qualifying round | 6–7 Mar | Bratislava (SVK) | Slovakia | 3–1 | Win |
| 2020–21 | Finals, Group C | 25–28 Nov | Innsbruck (AUT) | France | 1–2 | Loss |
| 2020–21 | Finals, Group C | 25–28 Nov | Innsbruck (AUT) | Great Britain | 1–2 | Loss |
| 2022 | Qualifying round | 4–5 Mar | Buenos Aires (ARG) | Argentina | 4–0 | Loss |
| 2022 | World Group I | 16–17 Sep | Tel Aviv (ISR) | Israel | 3–1 | Win |
| 2023 | Qualifying round | 4–5 Feb | Maia (POR) | Portugal | 3–1 | Win |
| 2023 | Finals, Group C | 13–22 Sep | Valencia (ESP) | Spain | 3–0 | Win |
| 2023 | Finals, Group C | 13–22 Sep | Valencia (ESP) | South Korea | 3–0 | Win |
| 2023 | Finals, Group C | 13–22 Sep | Valencia (ESP) | Serbia | 3–0 | Win |
| 2023 | Finals, Quarterfinals | 13–22 Sep | Valencia (ESP) | Australia | 1–2 | Loss |
| 2024 | Qualifying round | 3–4 Feb | Třinec (CZE) | Israel | 4–0 | Win |
| 2024 | Finals, Group B | 11–14 Sep | Valencia (ESP) | Spain | 0–3 | Loss |
| 2024 | Finals, Group B | 11–14 Sep | Valencia (ESP) | Australia | 0–3 | Loss |
| 2024 | Finals, Group B | 11–14 Sep | Valencia (ESP) | France | 1–2 | Loss |
| 2025 | Qualifiers first round | 31 Jan–1 Feb | Ostrava (CZE) | South Korea | 4–0 | Win |
| 2025 | Qualifiers second round | 13–14 Sep | Delray Beach (USA) | United States | 3–2 | Win |
| 2025 | Quarterfinals | 20 Nov | Bologna (ITA) | Spain | 1–2 | Loss |

== See also ==
- Davis Cup
- Czech Republic Billie Jean King Cup team
- Czech Republic at the Hopman Cup
- Slovakia Davis Cup team
