= 1999 Davis Cup World Group =

- Date: 2 April – 5 December
- Edition: 19th

Champions
- Australia
- Davis Cup

The World Group was the highest level of Davis Cup competition in 1999. The first-round losers went into the Davis Cup World Group qualifying round, and the winners progressed to the quarterfinals and were guaranteed a World Group spot for 2000.

Sweden were the defending champions, but were eliminated in the first round.

Australia won the title, defeating France in the final, 3–2. The final was held at the Acropolis Exhibition Hall in Nice, France, from 3 to 5 December. It was the Australian team's 27th Davis Cup title overall and their first since 1986.

== Participating teams ==
Participating teams
Australia	Belgium	Brazil	Czech Republic
France	Germany	Great Britain	Italy
Netherlands	Russia	Slovakia	Spain
Sweden	Switzerland	United States	Zimbabwe

== Draw ==
First round 2–4 April
Trollhättan, Sweden (indoor carpet)
Sweden	2
Slovakia	3
Frankfurt, Germany (indoor carpet)
Germany	2
Russia	3
Birmingham, England (indoor hard)
United States	3
Great Britain	2
Harare, Zimbabwe (indoor hard)
Australia	4
Zimbabwe	1
Nîmes, France (indoor clay)
Netherlands	1
France	4
Lleida, Spain (clay)
Brazil	3
Spain	2
Ghent, Belgium (indoor clay)
Belgium	3
Czech Republic	2
Neuchâtel, Switzerland (indoor carpet)
Switzerland	3
Italy	2

Quarterfinals; 16–18 July
Moscow, Russia (indoor clay)
Slovakia	2
Russia	3
Chestnut Hill, MA, United States (hard)
United States	1
Australia	4
Pau, France (indoor carpet)
France	3
Brazil	2
Brussels, Belgium (clay)
Belgium	3
Switzerland	2

Semifinals; 24–26 September
Brisbane, Australia (grass)
Russia	1
Australia	4
Pau, France (indoor carpet)
France	4
Belgium	1

Final; 3–5 December
Nice, France (indoor clay)
Australia	3
France	2

== First round ==
=== Sweden vs. Slovakia ===
Sweden
2
Arena Älvhögsborg, Trollhättan, Sweden
2–4 April 1999
Carpet (indoors)

Slovakia
3

			1	2	3	4	5
1	(Sweden) (Slovakia)	Thomas Johansson; Karol Kučera	1; 6	6^{7} 7^{9}	6; 2	3; 6
2	(Sweden) (Slovakia)	Thomas Enqvist; Dominik Hrbatý	5; 7	6; 4	6; 2	2; 6	4; 6
3	(Sweden) (Slovakia)	Jonas Björkman / Nicklas Kulti; Dominik Hrbatý / Karol Kučera	4; 6	7^{14} 6^{12}	6^{6} 7^{8}	6; 1	6; 3
4	(Sweden) (Slovakia)	Thomas Enqvist; Karol Kučera	6; 1	3; 6	2; 6	4; 6
5	(Sweden) (Slovakia)	Thomas Johansson; Dominik Hrbatý	6; 4	6; 4

=== Germany vs. Russia ===
Germany
2
Ballsporthalle, Frankfurt, Germany
2–4 April 1999
Carpet (indoors)

Russia
3

			1	2	3	4	5
1	(Germany) (Russia)	Tommy Haas; Marat Safin	6^{4} 7^{7}	6; 4	6; 3	2; 6	9; 7
2	(Germany) (Russia)	Nicolas Kiefer; Yevgeny Kafelnikov	6^{5} 7^{7}	4; 6	4; 6
3	(Germany) (Russia)	Boris Becker / David Prinosil; Yevgeny Kafelnikov / Andrei Olhovskiy	6^{4} 7^{7}	6; 2	6; 3	4; 6	10; 8
4	(Germany) (Russia)	Tommy Haas; Yevgeny Kafelnikov	3; 6	4; 6	2; 6
5	(Germany) (Russia)	Nicolas Kiefer; Marat Safin	6^{9} 7^{11}	4; 6	4; 6

=== Great Britain vs. United States ===
Great Britain
2
National Indoor Arena, Birmingham, England
2–4 April 1999
Hard (indoors)

United States
3

			1	2	3	4	5
1	(United Kingdom) (United States)	Tim Henman; Jim Courier	6^{2} 7^{7}	6; 2	6^{3} 7^{7}	7^{12} 6^{10}	5; 7
2	(United Kingdom) (United States)	Greg Rusedski; Todd Martin	4; 6	4; 6	2; 6
3	(United Kingdom) (United States)	Tim Henman / Greg Rusedski; Todd Martin / Alex O'Brien	3; 6	7; 5	6; 3	6^{5} 7^{7}	6; 3
4	(United Kingdom) (United States)	Tim Henman; Todd Martin	4; 6	7; 5	6; 3	7^{7} 6^{4}
5	(United Kingdom) (United States)	Greg Rusedski; Jim Courier	4; 6	7^{7} 6^{3}	3; 6	6; 1	6; 8

=== Zimbabwe vs. Australia ===
Zimbabwe
1
Harare Sports Club, Harare, Zimbabwe
2–4 April 1999
Hard (indoors)

Australia
4

			1	2	3	4	5
1	(Zimbabwe) (Australia)	Byron Black; Mark Philippoussis	6; 3	3; 6	4; 6	6; 3	7; 5
2	(Zimbabwe) (Australia)	Wayne Black; Pat Rafter	3; 6	6; 3	6^{4} 7^{7}	2; 6
3	(Zimbabwe) (Australia)	Byron Black / Wayne Black; Todd Woodbridge / Mark Woodforde	4; 6	6; 2	3; 6	0; 6
4	(Zimbabwe) (Australia)	Byron Black; Pat Rafter	4; 6	6^{2} 7^{7}	2; 6
5	(Zimbabwe) (Australia)	Wayne Black; Mark Philippoussis	3; 6	2; 6

=== France vs. Netherlands ===
France
4
Arena of Nîmes, Nîmes, France
2–4 April 1999
Clay (indoors)

Netherlands
1

			1	2	3	4	5
1	(France) (Netherlands)	Jérôme Golmard; Richard Krajicek	6; 3	6; 4	6^{5} 7^{7}	4; 6	2; 6
2	(France) (Netherlands)	Cédric Pioline; Paul Haarhuis	6; 2	7^{7} 6^{0}	6; 3
3	(France) (Netherlands)	Cédric Pioline / Guillaume Raoux; Paul Haarhuis / Jan Siemerink	6; 4	5; 7	7^{7} 6^{4}	6^{4} 7^{7}	6; 2
4	(France) (Netherlands)	Cédric Pioline; Richard Krajicek	6; 3	3; 6	7; 5	7^{7} 6^{5}
5	(France) (Netherlands)	Jérôme Golmard; Jan Siemerink	6; 4	7; 5

=== Spain vs. Brazil ===
Spain
2
Lleida Tennis Club, Lleida, Spain
2–4 April 1999
Clay

Brazil
3

			1	2	3	4	5
1	(Spain) (Brazil)	Carlos Moyá; Fernando Meligeni	6; 2	6^{3} 7^{7}	6; 0	6; 4
2	(Spain) (Brazil)	Àlex Corretja; Gustavo Kuerten	3; 6	4; 6	5; 7
3	(Spain) (Brazil)	Àlex Corretja / Albert Costa; Gustavo Kuerten / Jaime Oncins	2; 6	7; 5	6; 4	4; 6	3; 6
4	(Spain) (Brazil)	Carlos Moyá; Gustavo Kuerten	2; 6	4; 6	1; 6
5	(Spain) (Brazil)	Àlex Corretja; Márcio Carlsson	6; 1	6; 2

=== Belgium vs. Czech Republic ===
Belgium
3
Flanders Expo, Ghent, Belgium
2–4 April 1999
Clay

Czech Republic
2

			1	2	3	4	5
1	(Belgium) (Czech Republic)	Xavier Malisse; Bohdan Ulihrach	6^{6} 7^{8}	6; 2	6; 4	6; 2
2	(Belgium) (Czech Republic)	Filip Dewulf; Ctislav Doseděl	5; 7	3; 6	2; 6
3	(Belgium) (Czech Republic)	Filip Dewulf / Johan Van Herck; Jiří Novák / David Rikl	6^{4} 7^{7}	2; 6	0; 6
4	(Belgium) (Czech Republic)	Christophe Van Garsse; Bohdan Ulihrach	6; 0	6; 3	6; 4
5	(Belgium) (Czech Republic)	Xavier Malisse; Ctislav Doseděl	3; 6	6; 4	6; 0	7^{9} 6^{7}

=== Switzerland vs. Italy ===
Switzerland
3
Patinoire du Littoral, Neuchâtel, Switzerland
2–4 April 1999
Carpet (indoors)

Italy
2

			1	2	3	4	5
1	(Switzerland) (Italy)	Marc Rosset; Gianluca Pozzi	7^{7} 6^{2}	6; 4	7^{7} 6^{0}
2	(Switzerland) (Italy)	Roger Federer; Davide Sanguinetti	6; 4	6^{3} 7^{7}	6; 3	6; 4
3	(Switzerland) (Italy)	Lorenzo Manta / Marc Rosset; Stefano Pescosolido / Laurence Tieleman	7^{7} 6^{4}	4; 6	7; 5	6; 3
4	(Switzerland) (Italy)	Ivo Heuberger; Davide Sanguinetti	3; 6	6; 3	6^{8} 7^{10}
5	(Switzerland) (Italy)	Roger Federer; Gianluca Pozzi	4; 6	6^{4} 7^{7}

== Quarterfinals ==
=== Russia vs. Slovakia ===
Russia
3
Olympic Stadium, Moscow, Russia
16–18 July 1999
Clay (indoors)

Slovakia
2

			1	2	3	4	5
1	(Russia) (Slovakia)	Marat Safin; Karol Kučera	2; 6	6; 4	6; 2	6; 4
2	(Russia) (Slovakia)	Yevgeny Kafelnikov; Dominik Hrbatý	2; 6	6; 2	6^{3} 7^{7}	6; 1	7; 5
3	(Russia) (Slovakia)	Yevgeny Kafelnikov / Andrei Olhovskiy; Dominik Hrbatý / Karol Kučera	2; 6	2; 6	2; 6
4	(Russia) (Slovakia)	Yevgeny Kafelnikov; Karol Kučera	1; 6	3; 6	4; 6
5	(Russia) (Slovakia)	Marat Safin; Dominik Hrbatý	6; 3	4; 6	7; 5	6^{3} 7^{7}	6; 4

=== United States vs. Australia ===
United States
1
Longwood Cricket Club, Chestnut Hill, MA, United States
16–18 July 1999
Hard

Australia
4

			1	2	3	4	5
1	(United States) (Australia)	Todd Martin; Lleyton Hewitt	4; 6	7^{7} 6^{1}	3; 6	0; 6
2	(United States) (Australia)	Jim Courier; Pat Rafter	6^{5} 7^{7}	4; 6	4; 6
3	(United States) (Australia)	Alex O'Brien / Pete Sampras; Sandon Stolle / Mark Woodforde	6; 4	6; 3	3; 6	4; 6	6; 3
4	(United States) (Australia)	Todd Martin; Pat Rafter	6; 4	7; 5	3; 6	2; 6	4; 6
5	(United States) (Australia)	Alex O'Brien; Lleyton Hewitt	5; 7	4; 6

=== France vs. Brazil ===
France
3
Palais des Sports, Pau, France
16–18 July 1999
Carpet (indoors)

Brazil
2

			1	2	3	4	5
1	(France) (Brazil)	Sébastien Grosjean; Gustavo Kuerten	2; 6	7^{7} 6^{4}	6^{5} 7^{7}	7^{7} 6^{5}	7; 9
2	(France) (Brazil)	Cédric Pioline; Fernando Meligeni	6; 3	6; 3	6; 3
3	(France) (Brazil)	Olivier Delaître / Fabrice Santoro; Gustavo Kuerten / Jaime Oncins	7^{7} 6^{5}	6; 4	6; 4
4	(France) (Brazil)	Cédric Pioline; Gustavo Kuerten	6; 3	6; 4	6; 4
5	(France) (Brazil)	Sébastien Grosjean; Fernando Meligeni	7^{7} 6^{5}	4; 6	2; 6

=== Belgium vs. Switzerland ===
Belgium
3
Royal Primerose Tennis Club, Brussels, Belgium
16–18 July 1999
Clay

Switzerland
2

			1	2	3	4	5
1	(Belgium) (Switzerland)	Xavier Malisse; Lorenzo Manta	6; 4	6; 0	7^{7} 6^{1}
2	(Belgium) (Switzerland)	Christophe Van Garsse; Roger Federer	7^{7} 6^{4}	3; 6	1; 6	7; 5	6; 1
3	(Belgium) (Switzerland)	Filip Dewulf / Christophe Rochus; Lorenzo Manta / Marc Rosset	6; 2	1; 6	6^{7} 7^{9}	5; 7
4	(Belgium) (Switzerland)	Xavier Malisse; Roger Federer	4; 6	6; 3	7; 5	7^{7} 6^{5}
5	(Belgium) (Switzerland)	Christophe Van Garsse; George Bastl	6^{4} 7^{7}	0; 1				retired

== Semifinals ==
=== Australia vs. Russia ===
Australia
4
ANZ Stadium, Brisbane, Australia
24–26 September 1999
Grass

Russia
1

			1	2	3	4	5
1	(Australia) (Russia)	Lleyton Hewitt; Marat Safin	7^{7} 6^{0}	6; 2	4; 6	6; 3
2	(Australia) (Russia)	Wayne Arthurs; Yevgeny Kafelnikov	6; 2	6^{4} 7^{7}	6; 2	6; 0
3	(Australia) (Russia)	Sandon Stolle / Mark Woodforde; Yevgeny Kafelnikov / Andrei Olhovskiy	1; 6	4; 6	6; 4	6; 4	6; 8
4	(Australia) (Russia)	Lleyton Hewitt; Yevgeny Kafelnikov	6; 4	7; 5	6; 2
5	(Australia) (Russia)	Wayne Arthurs; Marat Safin	6; 3	6; 2

=== France vs. Belgium ===
France
4
Palais des Sports, Pau, France
24–26 September 1999
Carpet (indoors)

Belgium
1

			1	2	3	4	5
1	(France) (Belgium)	Sébastien Grosjean; Xavier Malisse	7; 5	6; 2	7^{7} 6^{3}
2	(France) (Belgium)	Cédric Pioline; Filip Dewulf	6; 3	5; 7	3; 6	6; 3	6; 2
3	(France) (Belgium)	Olivier Delaître / Fabrice Santoro; Xavier Malisse / Christophe Van Garsse	6; 3	6; 3	6; 3
4	(France) (Belgium)	Cédric Pioline; Christophe Van Garsse	3; 6	4; 6
5	(France) (Belgium)	Fabrice Santoro; Christophe Rochus	7; 5	6; 4

== Final ==
=== France vs. Australia ===
France
2
Acropolis Exhibition Hall, Nice, France
3–5 December 1999
Clay (indoors)

Australia
3

			1	2	3	4	5
1	(France) (Australia)	Sébastien Grosjean; Mark Philippoussis	4; 6	2; 6	4; 6
2	(France) (Australia)	Cédric Pioline; Lleyton Hewitt	7^{9} 6^{7}	7^{8} 6^{6}	7; 5
3	(France) (Australia)	Olivier Delaître / Fabrice Santoro; Todd Woodbridge / Mark Woodforde	6; 2	5; 7	2; 6	2; 6
4	(France) (Australia)	Cédric Pioline; Mark Philippoussis	3; 6	7; 5	1; 6	2; 6
5	(France) (Australia)	Sébastien Grosjean; Lleyton Hewitt	6; 4	6; 3
