= 1996 Davis Cup World Group =

- Date: 9 February – 1 December
- Edition: 16th

Champions
- France
← 1995 ·	Davis Cup	· 1997 →

The World Group was the highest level of Davis Cup competition in 1996. The first-round losers went into the Davis Cup World Group qualifying round, and the winners progressed to the quarterfinals and were guaranteed a World Group spot for 1997.

The United States were the defending champions, but were eliminated in the quarterfinals.

France won the title, defeating Sweden in the final, 3–2. The final was held at the Malmö Isstadion in Malmö, Sweden, from 29 November to 1 December. It was the French team's 8th Davis Cup title overall.

== Participating teams ==
Participating teams
Austria	Belgium	Czech Republic	Denmark
France	Germany	Hungary	India
Italy	Mexico	Netherlands	Russia
South Africa	Sweden	Switzerland	United States

== Draw ==
First round 9–11 February
Rome, Italy (clay)
Russia	2
Italy	3
Johannesburg, South Africa (indoor hard)
Austria	2
South Africa	3
Geneva, Switzerland (indoor clay)
Germany	5
Switzerland	0
Besançon, France (indoor hard)
France	5
Denmark	0
Jaipur, India (grass)
India	3
Netherlands	2
Katrineholm, Sweden (indoor carpet)
Belgium	1
Sweden	4
Plzeň, Czech Republic (indoor carpet)
Hungary	0
Czech Republic	5
Carlsbad, CA, United States (hard)
Mexico	0
United States	5

Quarterfinals; 5–7 April
Rome, Italy (clay)
Italy	4
South Africa	1
Limoges, France (indoor clay)
Germany	0
France	5
Calcutta, India (grass)
India	0
Sweden	5
Prague, Czech Republic (indoor carpet)
Czech Republic	3
United States	2

Semifinals; 20–22 September
Nantes, France (indoor carpet)
Italy	2
France	3
Prague, Czech Republic (indoor carpet)
Sweden	4
Czech Republic	1

Final; 29 November–1 December
Malmö, Sweden (indoor hard)
France	3
Sweden	2

== First round ==
=== Italy vs. Russia ===
Italy
3
Foro Italico, Rome, Italy
9–11 February 1996
Clay

Russia
2

			1	2	3	4	5
1	(Italy) (Russia)	Andrea Gaudenzi; Andrei Chesnokov	2; 6	6^{5} 7^{7}	7^{7} 6^{5}	6; 3	6; 1
2	(Italy) (Russia)	Renzo Furlan; Yevgeny Kafelnikov	3; 6	7; 5	4; 6	3; 6
3	(Italy) (Russia)	Andrea Gaudenzi / Diego Nargiso; Yevgeny Kafelnikov / Andrei Olhovskiy	6; 4	2; 6	5; 7	7^{7} 6^{4}	6; 4
4	(Italy) (Russia)	Andrea Gaudenzi; Yevgeny Kafelnikov	3; 6	6; 3	6^{4} 7^{7}	5; 7
5	(Italy) (Russia)	Renzo Furlan; Andrei Chesnokov	6; 0	3; 6	6; 3	7; 5

=== South Africa vs. Austria ===
South Africa
3
Wanderers Club, Johannesburg, South Africa
9–12 February 1996
Grass

Austria
2

			1	2	3	4	5
1	(South Africa) (Austria)	Marcos Ondruska; Thomas Muster	2; 6	5; 7	2; 6
2	(South Africa) (Austria)	Wayne Ferreira; Wolfgang Schranz	6; 1	7^{7} 6^{2}	6; 4
3	(South Africa) (Austria)	Wayne Ferreira / Gary Muller; Alex Antonitsch / Thomas Muster	6; 3	7^{7} 6^{3}	6^{5} 7^{7}	3; 6	6; 3
4	(South Africa) (Austria)	Wayne Ferreira; Thomas Muster	5; 7	7^{7} 6^{5}	4; 6	6^{4} 7^{7}
5	(South Africa) (Austria)	Marcos Ondruska; Gilbert Schaller	6; 3	6; 4	6; 2

=== Switzerland vs. Germany ===
Switzerland
0
Palexpo, Geneva, Switzerland
9–11 February 1996
Clay (indoors)

Germany
5

			1	2	3	4	5
1	(Switzerland) (Germany)	Jakob Hlasek; David Prinosil	4; 6	6^{4} 7^{7}	7; 5	6; 4	1; 6
2	(Switzerland) (Germany)	Marc Rosset; Hendrik Dreekmann	3; 6	1; 6	4; 6
3	(Switzerland) (Germany)	Jakob Hlasek / Alexandre Strambini; David Prinosil / Michael Stich	2; 6	5; 7	2; 6
4	(Switzerland) (Germany)	Alexandre Strambini; David Prinosil	3; 6	3; 6
5	(Switzerland) (Germany)	Jakob Hlasek; Hendrik Dreekmann	4; 6	4; 6

=== France vs. Denmark ===
France
5
Palais des Sports, Besançon, France
9–11 February 1996
Hard (indoors)

Denmark
0

			1	2	3	4	5
1	(France) (Denmark)	Guy Forget; Kenneth Carlsen	6; 4	7^{7} 6^{3}	5; 7	7^{9} 6^{7}
2	(France) (Denmark)	Cédric Pioline; Frederik Fetterlein	4; 6	6; 1	6; 1	6; 3
3	(France) (Denmark)	Guy Forget / Guillaume Raoux; Kenneth Carlsen / Frederik Fetterlein	4; 6	6; 3	7^{7} 6^{4}	6; 3
4	(France) (Denmark)	Cédric Pioline; Kenneth Carlsen	7; 5	6; 4
5	(France) (Denmark)	Guillaume Raoux; Frederik Fetterlein	6; 3	6; 4

=== India vs. Netherlands ===
India
3
Jai Tennis Club, Jaipur, India
9–11 February 1996
Grass

Netherlands
2

			1	2	3	4	5
1	(India) (Netherlands)	Leander Paes; Jacco Eltingh	4; 6	5; 7	4; 6
2	(India) (Netherlands)	Mahesh Bhupathi; Jan Siemerink	6; 4	7^{7} 6^{4}	4; 6	4; 6	6; 4
3	(India) (Netherlands)	Mahesh Bhupathi / Leander Paes; Jacco Eltingh / Paul Haarhuis	6; 3	2; 6	6^{3} 7^{7}	4; 6
4	(India) (Netherlands)	Leander Paes; Jan Siemerink	7^{7} 6^{2}	2; 6	7^{7} 6^{3}	7^{7} 6^{5}
5	(India) (Netherlands)	Mahesh Bhupathi; Jacco Eltingh	7^{7} 6^{4}	4; 6	7; 5	2; 1		retired

=== Sweden vs. Belgium ===
Sweden
4
Duveholmshallen, Katrineholm, Sweden
9–11 February 1996
Carpet (indoors)

Belgium
1

			1	2	3	4	5
1	(Sweden) (Belgium)	Magnus Larsson; Filip Dewulf	6; 3	7; 5	7^{7} 6^{4}
2	(Sweden) (Belgium)	Thomas Enqvist; Dick Norman	6; 4	6; 3	6; 1
3	(Sweden) (Belgium)	Jonas Björkman / Nicklas Kulti; Filip Dewulf / Dick Norman	6; 3	6; 1	6; 4
4	(Sweden) (Belgium)	Thomas Enqvist; Johan Van Herck	5; 7	2; 6
5	(Sweden) (Belgium)	Magnus Larsson; Dick Norman	7^{7} 6^{3}	6; 4

=== Czech Republic vs. Hungary ===
Czech Republic
5
Lokomotíva hala, Plzeň, Czech Republic
9–11 February 1996
Carpet (indoors)

Hungary
0

			1	2	3	4	5
1	(Czech Republic) (Hungary)	Daniel Vacek; József Krocskó	6; 3	6; 3	6; 4
2	(Czech Republic) (Hungary)	Petr Korda; Sándor Noszály	6; 2	7^{7} 6^{4}	6; 3
3	(Czech Republic) (Hungary)	Cyril Suk / Daniel Vacek; Gábor Köves / Sándor Noszály	6^{2} 7^{7}	6^{7} 7^{9}	7^{9} 6^{7}	6; 4	6; 4
4	(Czech Republic) (Hungary)	Daniel Vacek; Sándor Noszály	7; 5	6; 3
5	(Czech Republic) (Hungary)	Jiří Novák; József Krocskó	5; 7	7^{7} 6^{4}	6; 0

=== United States vs. Mexico ===
United States
5
La Costa Resort Hotel, Carlsbad, CA, United States
9–11 February 1996
Hard

Mexico
0

			1	2	3	4	5
1	(United States) (Mexico)	Michael Chang; Leonardo Lavalle	6; 1	6; 2	6; 4
2	(United States) (Mexico)	Todd Martin; Alejandro Hernández	6; 3	6; 3	6; 0
3	(United States) (Mexico)	Patrick Galbraith / Patrick McEnroe; Leonardo Lavalle / Óscar Ortiz	7^{9} 6^{7}	6; 4	6; 3
4	(United States) (Mexico)	Michael Chang; Alejandro Hernández	6; 0	6; 2
5	(United States) (Mexico)	Todd Martin; Leonardo Lavalle	3; 6	7^{7} 6^{1}	6; 4

== Quarterfinals ==
=== Italy vs. South Africa ===
Italy
4
Foro Italico, Rome, Italy
5–7 April 1996
Clay

South Africa
1

			1	2	3	4	5
1	(Italy) (South Africa)	Renzo Furlan; Marcos Ondruska	4; 6	4; 6	4; 6
2	(Italy) (South Africa)	Andrea Gaudenzi; Wayne Ferreira	5; 7	6; 3	2; 6	7; 5	6; 1
3	(Italy) (South Africa)	Andrea Gaudenzi / Diego Nargiso; Ellis Ferreira / Wayne Ferreira	5; 7	3; 6	6; 3	7^{9} 6^{7}	6; 2
4	(Italy) (South Africa)	Renzo Furlan; Wayne Ferreira	3; 6	6; 0	7^{7} 6^{4}	6; 2
5	(Italy) (South Africa)	Andrea Gaudenzi; Marcos Ondruska	6; 1	1; 1				retired

=== France vs. Germany ===
France
5
Palais des Sports de Beaublanc, Limoges, France
5–7 April 1996
Clay (indoors)

Germany
0

			1	2	3	4	5
1	(France) (Germany)	Cédric Pioline; David Prinosil	6; 0	6^{6} 7^{8}	6; 4	6; 3
2	(France) (Germany)	Arnaud Boetsch; Hendrik Dreekmann	4; 6	6; 4	3; 6	7^{7} 6^{2}	6; 3
3	(France) (Germany)	Arnaud Boetsch / Guy Forget; Boris Becker / Marc-Kevin Goellner	7^{8} 6^{6}	6; 4	7^{9} 6^{7}
4	(France) (Germany)	Guy Forget; David Prinosil	6; 3	0; 6	6; 4
5	(France) (Germany)	Cédric Pioline; Hendrik Dreekmann	6; 4	6; 3

=== India vs. Sweden ===
India
0
Calcutta South Club, Calcutta, India
5–7 April 1996
Grass

Sweden
5

			1	2	3	4	5
1	(India) (Sweden)	Leander Paes; Jonas Björkman	6; 1	4; 6	7; 5	3; 6	5; 7
2	(India) (Sweden)	Mahesh Bhupathi; Thomas Enqvist	7^{7} 6^{5}	6^{3} 7^{7}	1; 6	1; 6
3	(India) (Sweden)	Mahesh Bhupathi / Leander Paes; Jonas Björkman / Nicklas Kulti	7^{7} 6^{4}	3; 6	4; 6	1; 6
4	(India) (Sweden)	Leander Paes; Nicklas Kulti	3; 6	7^{7} 6^{4}	6^{6} 7^{8}
5	(India) (Sweden)	Mahesh Bhupathi; Jonas Björkman	2; 6	4; 6

=== Czech Republic vs. United States ===
Czech Republic
3
Sportovní hala Sparta, Prague, Czech Republic
5–7 April 1996
Carpet (indoors)

United States
2

			1	2	3	4	5
1	(Czech Republic) (United States)	Petr Korda; Todd Martin	2; 6	4; 6	5; 7
2	(Czech Republic) (United States)	Daniel Vacek; MaliVai Washington	4; 6	6; 3	6; 4	5; 7	6; 4
3	(Czech Republic) (United States)	Petr Korda / Daniel Vacek; Patrick Galbraith / Patrick McEnroe	6; 2	6; 3	6; 3
4	(Czech Republic) (United States)	Daniel Vacek; Todd Martin	6^{1} 7^{7}	3; 6	1; 6
5	(Czech Republic) (United States)	Petr Korda; MaliVai Washington	7^{7} 6^{5}	6; 3	6; 2

== Semifinals ==
=== France vs. Italy ===
France
3
Palais des Sports de Beaulieu, Nantes, France
20–22 September 1996
Carpet (indoors)

Italy
2

			1	2	3	4	5
1	(France) (Italy)	Cédric Pioline; Andrea Gaudenzi	7; 5	1; 6	6^{4} 7^{7}	3; 6
2	(France) (Italy)	Arnaud Boetsch; Renzo Furlan	5; 7	6; 1	3; 6	6^{5} 7^{7}
3	(France) (Italy)	Guy Forget / Guillaume Raoux; Andrea Gaudenzi / Diego Nargiso	6; 3	6; 4	6; 2
4	(France) (Italy)	Cédric Pioline; Renzo Furlan	6; 3	2; 6	6; 2	6; 4
5	(France) (Italy)	Arnaud Boetsch; Andrea Gaudenzi	6; 4	6; 2	7^{10} 6^{8}

=== Czech Republic vs. Sweden ===
Czech Republic
1
Sportovní hala Sparta, Prague, Czech Republic
22–24 September 1995
Clay (indoors)

Sweden
4

			1	2	3	4	5
1	(Czech Republic) (Sweden)	Petr Korda; Thomas Enqvist	4; 6	3; 6	6^{9} 7^{11}
2	(Czech Republic) (Sweden)	Daniel Vacek; Stefan Edberg	6^{2} 7^{7}	5; 7	6; 4	3; 6
3	(Czech Republic) (Sweden)	Petr Korda / Daniel Vacek; Jonas Björkman / Nicklas Kulti	4; 6	6; 3	6; 4	6; 4
4	(Czech Republic) (Sweden)	Daniel Vacek; Thomas Enqvist	3; 6	7^{7} 6^{3}	6; 4	5; 7	3; 6
5	(Czech Republic) (Sweden)	Petr Korda; Stefan Edberg	6; 4	2; 6	5; 7

== Final ==
=== Sweden vs. France ===
Sweden
2
Malmö Isstadion, Malmö, Sweden
29 November–1 December 1996
Hard (indoors)

France
3

			1	2	3	4	5
1	(Sweden) (France)	Stefan Edberg; Cédric Pioline	3; 6	4; 6	3; 6
2	(Sweden) (France)	Thomas Enqvist; Arnaud Boetsch	6; 4	6; 3	7^{7} 6^{2}
3	(Sweden) (France)	Jonas Björkman / Nicklas Kulti; Guy Forget / Guillaume Raoux	3; 6	6; 1	3; 6	3; 6
4	(Sweden) (France)	Thomas Enqvist; Cédric Pioline	3; 6	6^{8} 7^{10}	6; 4	6; 4	9; 7
5	(Sweden) (France)	Nicklas Kulti; Arnaud Boetsch	6^{2} 7^{7}	6; 2	6; 4	6^{5} 7^{7}	8; 10
