= 2000 Davis Cup World Group =

- Date: 4 February – 10 December
- Edition: 20th

Champions
- Spain
- Davis Cup

The World Group was the highest level of Davis Cup competition in 2000. The first-round losers went into the Davis Cup World Group qualifying round, and the winners progressed to the quarterfinals and were guaranteed a World Group spot for 2001.

Spain won the title, defeating the defending champions Australia in the final, 3–1. The final was held at the Palau Sant Jordi in Barcelona, Spain, from 8 to 10 December. It was the Spanish team's first Davis Cup title.

== Participating teams ==
Participating teams
Australia	Austria	Belgium	Brazil
Czech Republic	France	Germany	Great Britain
Italy	Netherlands	Russia	Slovakia
Spain	Switzerland	United States	Zimbabwe

== Draw ==
First round 4–6 February
Harare, Zimbabwe (indoor hard)
United States	3
Zimbabwe	2
Ostrava, Czech Republic (indoor clay)
Great Britain	1
Czech Republic	4
Murcia, Spain (clay)
Spain	4
Italy	1
Moscow, Russia (indoor carpet)
Russia	4
Belgium	1
Bratislava, Slovakia (indoor hard)
Austria	2
Slovakia	3
Florianópolis, Brazil (clay)
Brazil	4
France	1
Leipzig, Germany (indoor carpet)
Netherlands	1
Germany	4
Zürich, Switzerland (indoor carpet)
Switzerland	2
Australia	3

Quarterfinals; 7–9 April
Inglewood, CA, United States (indoor carpet)
United States	3
Czech Republic	2
Málaga, Spain (clay)
Spain	4
Russia	1
Rio de Janeiro, Brazil (clay)
Slovakia	2
Brazil	3
Adelaide, Australia (grass)
Germany	2
Australia	3

Semifinals; 21–23 July
Santander, Spain (clay)
United States	0
Spain	5
Brisbane, Australia (grass)
Brazil	0
Australia	5

Final; 8–10 December
Barcelona, Spain (indoor clay)
Spain	3
Australia	1

== First round ==
=== Zimbabwe vs. United States ===
Zimbabwe
2
Harare Sports Club, Harare, Zimbabwe
4–6 February 2000
Hard (indoors)

United States
3

			1	2	3	4	5
1	(Zimbabwe) (United States)	Wayne Black; Andre Agassi	5; 7	3; 6	5; 7
2	(Zimbabwe) (United States)	Byron Black; Chris Woodruff	7^{7} 6^{2}	6; 3	6; 2
3	(Zimbabwe) (United States)	Wayne Black / Kevin Ullyett; Rick Leach / Alex O'Brien	7^{7} 6^{4}	5; 7	0; 6	7; 5	7; 5
4	(Zimbabwe) (United States)	Byron Black; Andre Agassi	2; 6	3; 6	6^{4} 7^{7}
5	(Zimbabwe) (United States)	Wayne Black; Chris Woodruff	3; 6	7^{7} 6^{2}	2; 6	4; 6

=== Czech Republic vs. Great Britain ===
Czech Republic
4
Zimní stadion, Ostrava, Czech Republic
4–6 February 2000
Clay (indoors)

Great Britain
1

			1	2	3	4	5
1	(Czech Republic) (United Kingdom)	Ctislav Doseděl; Tim Henman	7^{7} 6^{4}	7; 5	1; 6	5; 7	3; 6
2	(Czech Republic) (United Kingdom)	Jiří Novák; Jamie Delgado	6; 4	7^{7} 6^{4}	6; 3
3	(Czech Republic) (United Kingdom)	Jiří Novák / David Rikl; Neil Broad / Tim Henman	7^{7} 6^{4}	6; 4	6^{4} 7^{7}	6; 2
4	(Czech Republic) (United Kingdom)	Jiří Novák; Tim Henman	6; 4	6; 2	6; 2
5	(Czech Republic) (United Kingdom)	Bohdan Ulihrach; Jamie Delgado	5; 7	7; 5	6; 4

=== Spain vs. Italy ===
Spain
4
Murcia Tennis Club, Murcia, Spain
4–6 February 2000
Clay

Italy
1

			1	2	3	4	5
1	(Spain) (Italy)	Albert Costa; Davide Sanguinetti	6; 4	6; 4	6; 2
2	(Spain) (Italy)	Àlex Corretja; Andrea Gaudenzi	4; 6	6; 1	6; 1	6; 1
3	(Spain) (Italy)	Joan Balcells / Àlex Corretja; Andrea Gaudenzi / Diego Nargiso	6; 3	6; 4	6; 1
4	(Spain) (Italy)	Albert Costa; Andrea Gaudenzi	7; 5	5; 7	4; 6
5	(Spain) (Italy)	Francisco Clavet; Vincenzo Santopadre	6^{5} 7^{7}	6; 1	6; 3

=== Russia vs. Belgium ===
Russia
4
Olympic Stadium, Moscow, Russia
4–6 February 2000
Carpet (indoors)

Belgium
1

			1	2	3	4	5
1	(Russia) (Belgium)	Yevgeny Kafelnikov; Filip Dewulf	6^{3} 7^{7}	6; 4	7; 5	6; 2
2	(Russia) (Belgium)	Marat Safin; Christophe Rochus	7; 5	3; 6	6; 2	6; 4
3	(Russia) (Belgium)	Andrei Cherkasov / Marat Safin; Christophe Rochus / Olivier Rochus	4; 6	7^{7} 6^{2}	1; 6	6; 1	6; 3
4	(Russia) (Belgium)	Mikhail Youzhny; Olivier Rochus	7^{8} 6^{6}	6; 2
5	(Russia) (Belgium)	Andrei Cherkasov; Filip Dewulf	0; 6	6; 4	1; 6

=== Slovakia vs. Austria ===
Slovakia
3
Incheba Hall, Bratislava, Slovakia
4–6 February 2000
Hard (indoors)

Austria
2

			1	2	3	4	5
1	(Slovakia) (Austria)	Karol Kučera; Markus Hipfl	6; 2	6; 3	6; 3
2	(Slovakia) (Austria)	Dominik Hrbatý; Stefan Koubek	6; 4	6; 4	6; 4
3	(Slovakia) (Austria)	Dominik Hrbatý / Karol Kučera; Julian Knowle / Alexander Peya	6; 4	6; 3	6; 4
4	(Slovakia) (Austria)	Ján Krošlák; Stefan Koubek	3; 6	2; 6
5	(Slovakia) (Austria)	Ladislav Švarc; Markus Hipfl	2; 6	4; 6

=== Brazil vs. France ===
Brazil
4
Municipal Centre, Florianópolis, Brazil
4–6 February 2000
Clay

France
1

			1	2	3	4	5
1	(Brazil) (France)	Fernando Meligeni; Cédric Pioline	7; 5	5; 7	4; 6	6; 1	6; 4
2	(Brazil) (France)	Gustavo Kuerten; Jérôme Golmard	6; 3	3; 6	6; 3	6; 2
3	(Brazil) (France)	Gustavo Kuerten / Jaime Oncins; Nicolas Escudé / Cédric Pioline	6; 4	6; 4	6; 4
4	(Brazil) (France)	Gustavo Kuerten; Nicolas Escudé	2; 6	6^{3} 7^{7}
5	(Brazil) (France)	Francisco Costa; Arnaud Clément	7^{7} 6^{5}	5; 7	6; 2

=== Germany vs. Netherlands ===
Germany
4
Messe Hall, Leipzig, Germany
4–6 February 2000
Carpet (indoors)

Netherlands
1

			1	2	3	4	5
1	(Germany) (Netherlands)	Tommy Haas; John van Lottum	4; 6	7^{7} 6^{4}	6; 3	6; 2
2	(Germany) (Netherlands)	Rainer Schüttler; Sjeng Schalken	6; 3	6^{2} 7^{7}	1; 6	0; 6
3	(Germany) (Netherlands)	Marc-Kevin Goellner / David Prinosil; Paul Haarhuis / Jan Siemerink	4; 6	6; 3	7^{7} 6^{3}	6; 3
4	(Germany) (Netherlands)	Tommy Haas; Sjeng Schalken	6; 2	6; 2	6; 3
5	(Germany) (Netherlands)	David Prinosil; John van Lottum	6; 3	6; 3

=== Switzerland vs. Australia ===
Switzerland
2
Saalsporthalle, Zürich, Switzerland
4–6 February 2000
Carpet (indoors)

Australia
3

			1	2	3	4	5
1	(Switzerland) (Australia)	George Bastl; Lleyton Hewitt	6; 4	3; 6	2; 6	4; 6
2	(Switzerland) (Australia)	Roger Federer; Mark Philippoussis	6; 4	7^{7} 6^{3}	4; 6	6; 4
3	(Switzerland) (Australia)	Roger Federer / Lorenzo Manta; Wayne Arthurs / Sandon Stolle	3; 6	6; 3	6; 4	7^{7} 6^{4}
4	(Switzerland) (Australia)	Roger Federer; Lleyton Hewitt	2; 6	6; 3	6^{2} 7^{7}	1; 6
5	(Switzerland) (Australia)	George Bastl; Mark Philippoussis	7^{7} 6^{3}	4; 6	6; 3	3; 6	4; 6

== Quarterfinals ==
=== United States vs. Czech Republic ===
United States
3
Great Western Forum, Inglewood, CA, United States
7–9 April 2000
Carpet (indoors)

Czech Republic
2

			1	2	3	4	5
1	(United States) (Czech Republic)	Pete Sampras; Jiří Novák	6^{1} 7^{7}	3; 6	2; 6
2	(United States) (Czech Republic)	Andre Agassi; Ctislav Doseděl	6; 3	6; 3	6; 3
3	(United States) (Czech Republic)	Alex O'Brien / Jared Palmer; Jiří Novák / David Rikl	5; 7	4; 6	4; 6
4	(United States) (Czech Republic)	Andre Agassi; Jiří Novák	6; 3	6; 3	6; 1
5	(United States) (Czech Republic)	Pete Sampras; Ctislav Doseděl	6; 4	6; 4	7^{7} 6^{2}

=== Spain vs. Russia ===
Spain
4
Calderón Sports Club, Málaga, Spain
7–9 April 2000
Clay

Russia
1

			1	2	3	4	5
1	(Spain) (Russia)	Àlex Corretja; Marat Safin	6; 4	6; 3	5; 7	6; 1
2	(Spain) (Russia)	Juan Carlos Ferrero; Yevgeny Kafelnikov	6; 2	6; 2	6; 2
3	(Spain) (Russia)	Joan Balcells / Àlex Corretja; Yevgeny Kafelnikov / Marat Safin	6^{4} 7^{7}	6; 2	6^{3} 7^{7}	4; 6
4	(Spain) (Russia)	Albert Costa; Yevgeny Kafelnikov	6; 0	6; 3	6; 0
5	(Spain) (Russia)	Juan Carlos Ferrero; Marat Safin	6; 0	6; 3

=== Brazil vs. Slovakia ===
Brazil
3
Marapendi Racquet Centre, Rio de Janeiro, Brazil
7–9 April 2000
Clay

Slovakia
2

			1	2	3	4	5
1	(Brazil) (Slovakia)	Fernando Meligeni; Dominik Hrbatý	1; 6	5; 7	2; 6
2	(Brazil) (Slovakia)	Gustavo Kuerten; Karol Kučera	2; 6	6; 3	4; 6	7; 5	6; 1
3	(Brazil) (Slovakia)	Gustavo Kuerten / Jaime Oncins; Dominik Hrbatý / Karol Kučera	6; 3	2; 6	6; 2	6; 3
4	(Brazil) (Slovakia)	Gustavo Kuerten; Dominik Hrbatý	5; 7	4; 6	6^{5} 7^{7}
5	(Brazil) (Slovakia)	Fernando Meligeni; Karol Kučera	5; 7	7^{8} 6^{6}	6; 2	6; 4

=== Australia vs. Germany ===
Australia
3
Memorial Drive, Adelaide, Australia
7–9 April 2000
Grass

Germany
2

			1	2	3	4	5
1	(Australia) (Germany)	Lleyton Hewitt; Michael Kohlmann	6; 1	6; 1	6; 2
2	(Australia) (Germany)	Wayne Arthurs; David Prinosil	7^{7} 6^{4}	3; 6	7^{7} 6^{3}	6^{7} 7^{9}	11; 9
3	(Australia) (Germany)	Pat Rafter / Mark Woodforde; Marc-Kevin Goellner / David Prinosil	6; 3	6; 2	2; 6	6^{4} 7^{7}	10; 8
4	(Australia) (Germany)	Lleyton Hewitt; Rainer Schüttler	6; 2	3; 6	4; 6
5	(Australia) (Germany)	Wayne Arthurs; Michael Kohlmann	5; 7	6^{5} 7^{7}

== Semifinals ==
=== Spain vs. United States ===
Spain
5
Real Sociedad de Tenis, Santander, Spain
21–23 July 2000
Clay

United States
0

			1	2	3	4	5
1	(Spain) (United States)	Albert Costa; Todd Martin	6; 4	6; 4	6; 4
2	(Spain) (United States)	Àlex Corretja; Jan-Michael Gambill	1; 6	6; 3	6; 4	6; 4
3	(Spain) (United States)	Joan Balcells / Àlex Corretja; Todd Martin / Chris Woodruff	7^{8} 6^{6}	2; 6	6; 3	6^{5} 7^{7}	6; 3
4	(Spain) (United States)	Juan Carlos Ferrero; Vince Spadea	4; 6	6; 1	6; 4
5	(Spain) (United States)	Joan Balcells; Jan-Michael Gambill	1; 6	7^{7} 6^{2}	6; 4

=== Australia vs. Brazil ===
Australia
5
ANZ Stadium, Brisbane, Australia
14–16 July 2000
Grass

Brazil
0

			1	2	3	4	5
1	(Australia) (Brazil)	Pat Rafter; Gustavo Kuerten	6; 3	6; 2	6; 3
2	(Australia) (Brazil)	Lleyton Hewitt; Fernando Meligeni	6; 4	6; 2	6; 3
3	(Australia) (Brazil)	Sandon Stolle / Mark Woodforde; Gustavo Kuerten / Jaime Oncins	6^{3} 7^{7}	6; 4	3; 6	6; 3	6; 4
4	(Australia) (Brazil)	Lleyton Hewitt; André Sá	6; 4	6; 1
5	(Australia) (Brazil)	Pat Rafter; Fernando Meligeni	6; 3	6; 4

== Final ==
=== Spain vs. Australia ===
Spain
3
Palau Sant Jordi, Barcelona, Spain
8–10 December 2000
Clay (indoors)

Australia
1

			1	2	3	4	5
1	(Spain) (Australia)	Albert Costa; Lleyton Hewitt	6; 3	1; 6	6; 2	4; 6	4; 6
2	(Spain) (Australia)	Juan Carlos Ferrero; Pat Rafter	6^{4} 7^{7}	7^{7} 6^{2}	6; 2	3; 1		retired
3	(Spain) (Australia)	Joan Balcells / Àlex Corretja; Sandon Stolle / Mark Woodforde	6; 4	6; 4	6; 4
4	(Spain) (Australia)	Juan Carlos Ferrero; Lleyton Hewitt	6; 2	7^{7} 6^{5}	4; 6	6; 4
5	(Spain) (Australia)	Albert Costa; Pat Rafter						not played
