= 2015 Delray Beach International Tennis Championships – Team legends =

Team legends
- 2015 Delray Beach International Tennis Championships

Final
- Champions: (United Nations) Team International
- Runners-up: (United States) Team USA
- Score: 6–3 (9 ties played)

Events
Singles	Doubles
- Delray Beach Open

The 2015 Delray Beach Open featured a team tennis competition between Team USA and Team International. The event is officially recognized by the ATP Champions Tour.

Each team is composed by 3 players, and each player will face all 3 players of the other team. A win awards a point for his respective team. All matches are played at best of 3 sets, with a champions tie-break at the third set if necessary.

Team International won the tournament 6–3 over Team USA.

This tournament marked the official debut of James Blake in the ATP Champions Tour, after retiring from professional tennis in 2012. Blake qualified to the tour after winning the Davis Cup in 2007.

== Players ==
For a player to be eligible for play on this tour, he must be in the year of his 35th birthday or have been retired from the ATP World Tour for two years or more. Each player must have been either a world No. 1, a Grand Slam finalist, or a singles player in a winning Davis Cup team. Each event can also invite two players of its choice to take wild cards.

The draw was announced on 13 February 2015

Player	Age*	Ranking	Grand Slams	Davis Cup	Entry criteria
Team United States
(United States) James Blake	35 years, 47 days	No. 4 (November 2006)	Quarterfinals (USO '05, USO '06, AO '08)	Champion (2007)	Eligible
(United States) Brad Gilbert	53 years, 188 days	No. 4 (January 1990)	Quarterfinals (USO '87 and WIM '90)	Semifinals (1986, 1989)	Wild card
(United States) Justin Gimelstob	38 years, 18 days	No. 63 (April 1999)	Third round (USO '97 & '99, WIM '00, '03 & '05)	Semifinals (1998)	Wild card
(United Nations) Team International
(Croatia) Goran Ivanišević	43 years, 153 days	No. 2 (July 1994)	Champion (2001 Wimbledon)	Semifinals (1989)	Eligible
(Australia) Mark Philippoussis	38 years, 98 days	No. 8 (April 1999)	Runner-up (USO '98 and WIM '03)	Champion (1999, 2003)	Eligible
(Sweden) Mikael Pernfors	51 years, 212 days	No. 10 (September 1986)	Runner-up (1986 French Open)	Runner-up (1986)	Eligible
Withdrew before the tournament
(United States) Michael Chang	42 years, 356 days	No. 2 (September 1996)	Champion (1989 French Open)	Champion (1990)	Withdrew (hamstring injury)
(Spain) Emilio Sánchez	49 years, 260 days	No. 7 (April 1990)	Quarterfinals (RG '88 and USO '88)	Semifinals (1987)	Withdrew (groin injury)

* - at start of tournament.

== Draw ==
All times are local, EST (UTC−5).

=== Day 1 (13 February) ===
Matches started at 18:00

No.	USA player	INT player	Winner	Score	(United States)	(United Nations)
1	(United States) James Blake	(Australia) Mark Philippoussis	Blake	6–7^{(3–7)}, 6–3, [10–8]	1	0
2	(United States) Brad Gilbert	(Croatia) Goran Ivanišević	Ivanišević	6–2, 6–4	1	1

=== Day 2 (14 February) ===
Matches started at 12:00

No.	USA player	INT player	Winner	Score	(United States)	(United Nations)
3	(United States) Justin Gimelstob	(Australia) Mark Philippoussis	Philippoussis	6–3, 6–1	1	2
4	(United States) Brad Gilbert	(Sweden) Mikael Pernfors	Pernfors	6–2, 6–3	1	3
5	(United States) Justin Gimelstob	(Croatia) Goran Ivanišević	Ivanišević	7–5, 5–7, [10–6]	1	4
6	(United States) James Blake	(Sweden) Mikael Pernfors	Blake	7–5, 6–2	2	4

=== Day 3 (15 February) ===
Matches started at 12:00

No.	USA player	INT player	Winner	Score	(United States)	(United Nations)
7	(United States) Brad Gilbert	(Australia) Mark Philippoussis	Philippoussis	6–2, 6–4	2	5
8	(United States) Justin Gimelstob	(Sweden) Mikael Pernfors	Pernfors	6–4, 4–6, [10–6]	2	6
9	(United States) James Blake	(Croatia) Goran Ivanišević	Blake	6–7^{(3–7)}, 6–1, [10–4]	3	6

== Winners ==
Delray Beach Open champions
(United Nations)
Team International
1st title
