= ATP Champions Tour =

Professional tennis tour for retired players

The ATP Champions Tour was a men's tennis tour intended for former tennis professionals, who have since retired from mainstream professional tennis touring (The ATP). The Tour brings together many of the greatest tennis players in history for nostalgic, competitive and entertaining tournaments in cities around the world.

For a player to be eligible for play on this tour, he must be in the year of his 35th birthday or have been retired from the ATP Tour for two years or more. Each player must have been either a world No. 1, a Grand Slam finalist, or a singles player in a winning Davis Cup team. Each event can also invite two players of its choice to take wild cards.

The Tour usually consists of around 10 events around the world, with a year-ending "My World Champions Tennis" event held at the Royal Albert Hall in London. Events are typically played over four days with eight-man fields competing against each other in a round-robin format, ensuring that all players feature in at least three matches. The players are split into two groups of four. The top player from each group contests the final, while the two players who finish second in each group play off for third and fourth places respectively.

Matches are contested over the best of three sets, with the deciding set taking the form of a Champions tie-break. The Champions tie-break is an expanded version of the conventional professional tennis tie-break, whereby the winner is the first player to reach 10 points and lead by a margin of 2.

Rankings points on the Tour are distributed as follows: Winner: 400 / Runner-up: 300 / 3rd place: 200 / 4th place: 150 / No. 5-6: 80 / No. 7-8: 60 points.

Notable participants, in past and present, were: John McEnroe, Björn Borg, Mats Wilander, Henri Leconte, Pete Sampras, Mansour Bahrami, Stefan Edberg, Boris Becker, Jim Courier, Thomas Muster, Marcelo Ríos, Fernando González, Goran Ivanišević, Yevgeny Kafelnikov, Patrick Rafter, Ivan Lendl, Carlos Moyá, Jimmy Connors, Tim Henman and Andy Roddick.

== Participants ==
The following is a list of past participants on the ATP Champions Tour

- (Iran) Mansour Bahrami
- (United Kingdom) Jeremy Bates
- (Germany) Boris Becker
- (United States) James Blake
- (Sweden) Björn Borg
- (Spain) Sergi Bruguera
- (Italy) Omar Camporese
- (Australia) Pat Cash
- (United States) Michael Chang
- (Argentina) José Luis Clerc
- (United States) Jimmy Connors
- (Spain) Albert Costa
- (United States) Jim Courier
- (Brazil) Marcos Daniel
- (Sweden) Stefan Edberg
- (Morocco) Younes El Aynaoui
- (Sweden) Thomas Enqvist
- (South Africa) Wayne Ferreira
- (France) Guy Forget
- (Italy) Renzo Furlan
- (United States) Brad Gilbert
- (United States) Justin Gimelstob
- (Ecuador) Andrés Gómez
- (Chile) Fernando González
- (Sweden) Magnus Gustafsson
- (Netherlands) Paul Haarhuis
- (United Kingdom) Tim Henman
- (Croatia) Goran Ivanišević
- (Sweden) Anders Järryd
- (Russia) Yevgeny Kafelnikov
- (Czech Republic) Petr Korda
- (Netherlands) Richard Krajicek
- (United States) Aaron Krickstein
- (Sweden) Magnus Larsson
- (France) Henri Leconte
- (United States) Ivan Lendl
- (United States) Todd Martin
- (Belgium) Xavier Malisse
- (United States) John McEnroe
- (Brazil) Fernando Meligeni
- (Spain) Carlos Moyá
- (Austria) Thomas Muster
- (France) Yannick Noah
- (Sweden) Mikael Pernfors
- (Australia) Mark Philippoussis
- (France) Cédric Pioline
- (Australia) Patrick Rafter
- (France) Guillaume Raoux
- (Chile) Marcelo Ríos
- (United States) Andy Roddick
- (United Kingdom) Greg Rusedski
- (Russia) Marat Safin
- (United States) Pete Sampras
- (France) Fabrice Santoro
- (Brazil) Flávio Saretta
- (Germany) Carl-Uwe Steeb
- (Germany) Michael Stich
- (Argentina) Guillermo Vilas
- (Sweden) Mats Wilander
- (Argentina) Mariano Zabaleta

== Year-end number 1 ==
Year	Player
1998	(United States) John McEnroe
1999	(United States) John McEnroe (2)
2000	(United States) John McEnroe (3)
2001	(United States) John McEnroe (4)
2002	(Czech Republic) Petr Korda
2003	(United States) John McEnroe (5)
2004	(United States) Jim Courier
2005	(Croatia) Goran Ivanišević
2006	(Chile) Marcelo Ríos
2007	(Spain) Sergi Bruguera
2008	(Croatia) Goran Ivanišević (2)
2009	(Sweden) Thomas Enqvist
2010	(Sweden) Thomas Enqvist (2)
2011	(Spain) Carlos Moyá
2012	(Spain) Carlos Moyá (2)
2013	(United States) John McEnroe (6)
2014	(Croatia) Goran Ivanišević (3)
2015	(Chile) Fernando González
2016	(United States) John McEnroe (7)

== Past finals ==
=== 2000 ===
Tournament	Winner	Runner-up	Score	Third place
Dublin	(United States) John McEnroe	(France) Henri Leconte	6–4, 6–3	(Australia) Pat Cash
Naples, Florida	(United States) John McEnroe	(France) Henri Leconte	6–0, 0–1 retired	None
Doha	(Sweden) Björn Borg	(Sweden) Mats Wilander	3–6, 6–3, [10–8]	(United States) John McEnroe
Majorca	(Sweden) Anders Järryd	(Sweden) Mats Wilander	6–1, 6–1	(Australia) Pat Cash
Richmond, Virginia	(United States) John McEnroe	(Ecuador) Andrés Gómez	6–1, 6–2	None
Raleigh, North Carolina	(United States) John McEnroe	(Sweden) Mats Wilander	6–1, 6–4	None
New York	(Sweden) Mikael Pernfors	(France) Henri Leconte	6–2, 6–2	None
San Diego, California	(Australia) Pat Cash	(United States) John McEnroe	6–3, 7–5	(Ecuador) Andrés Gómez
Åland	(Sweden) Björn Borg	(Sweden) Anders Järryd	6–3, 5–7, [11–9]	(Finland) Veli Paloheimo
Chicago	(United States) John McEnroe	(Sweden) Mats Wilander	6–2, 6–4	None
Paris	(France) Guy Forget	(Australia) Pat Cash	7–6, 6–2	(United States) John McEnroe
Palo Alto, California	(United States) John McEnroe	(Argentina) José Luis Clerc	6–2, 6–3	None
Geneva	(United States) John McEnroe	(France) Guy Forget	7–6, 6–2	(France) Yannick Noah
Singapore	(United States) John McEnroe	(Iran) Mansour Bahrami	6–2, 6–2	None
Hong Kong	(United States) John McEnroe	(Sweden) Mats Wilander	6–1, 6–3	(Sweden) Mikael Pernfors
Frankfurt	(United States) John McEnroe	(France) Henri Leconte	6–1, 6–3	(Sweden) Mikael Pernfors
London	(Australia) Pat Cash	(United States) John McEnroe	6–7, 7–5, [14–12]	None

=== 2001 ===
Tournament	Winner	Runner-up	Score	Third place
Dublin	(United States) John McEnroe	(France) Guy Forget	7–6(7), 7–6(6)	(Australia) Pat Cash
Naples, Florida	(Ecuador) Andrés Gómez	(United States) John McEnroe	3–6, 6–3, [11–9]	None
Newport Beach, California	(United States) John McEnroe	(Australia) Pat Cash	7–6(4), 5–7, [10–7]	None
London	(France) Guy Forget	(Czech Republic) Petr Korda	7–5, 6–7(5), [10–7]	None

=== 2002 ===
Tournament	Winner	Runner-up	Score	Third place
Majorca	(France) Yannick Noah	(Sweden) Anders Järryd	7–5, 2–6, [10–6]	(France) Henri Leconte
Algarve	(United States) John McEnroe	(Ecuador) Andrés Gómez	6–2, 6–3	(Germany) Carl-Uwe Steeb
Graz	(Germany) Boris Becker	(Czech Republic) Petr Korda	6–4, 6–4	None
Paris	(Switzerland) Jakob Hlasek	(France) Yannick Noah	4–6, 6–2, [10–3]	None
Eindhoven	(United States) John McEnroe	(Czech Republic) Petr Korda	3–6, 6–3, [10–3]	(Netherlands) Paul Haarhuis
Monte Carlo	(Czech Republic) Petr Korda	(United States) John McEnroe	6–4, 6–4	(France) Yannick Noah
Frankfurt	(Czech Republic) Petr Korda	(Germany) Michael Stich	6–3, 6–4	(United States) John McEnroe
London	(Czech Republic) Petr Korda	(Germany) Michael Stich	6–1, 6–4	(France) Henri Leconte

=== 2003 ===
Tournament	Winner	Runner-up	Score	Third place
Brussel	(United States) John McEnroe	(France) Guy Forget	6–2, 6–7(12), [10–6]	(Belgium) Filip Dewulf
Algarve	(Germany) Michael Stich	(United States) John McEnroe	6–4, 6–0	(United Kingdom) Jeremy Bates
Graz	(Germany) Boris Becker	(Sweden) Mats Wilander	7–5. 6–0	(Austria) Thomas Muster
Paris	(France) Guy Forget	(France) Guillaume Raoux	6–1, 6–2	(France) Yannick Noah
Eindhoven	(United States) John McEnroe	(Czech Republic) Petr Korda	2–6, 6–3, [10–8]	(Netherlands) Jan Siemerink
Monte Carlo	(United States) John McEnroe	(Czech Republic) Petr Korda	6–2, 6–2	(Austria) Thomas Muster
London	(United States) John McEnroe	(France) Guy Forget	7–6, 6–2	None

=== 2004 ===
Tournament	Winner	Runner-up	Score	Third place
Rome	(Austria) Thomas Muster	(Sweden) Mats Wilander	6–4, 6–4	(Italy) Omar Camporese
Algarve	(United States) Jim Courier	(Netherlands) Richard Krajicek	6–2, 6–7(6), [11–9]	(Spain) Emilio Sánchez
Seiersberg	(Germany) Boris Becker	(Austria) Thomas Muster	6–2, 6–4	(Spain) Sergi Bruguera
Paris	(Spain) Sergi Bruguera	(United States) Jim Courier	6–2, 6–4	(Germany) Michael Stich
Eindhoven	(Croatia) Goran Ivanišević	(United States) Jim Courier	7–6(4), 7–6(7)	(Austria) Thomas Muster
Brussels	(United States) Jim Courier	(France) Guy Forget	2–6, 7–6(3), [10–5]	(Netherlands) Richard Krajicek
London	(United States) Jim Courier	(Austria) Thomas Muster	7–6(4), 6–4	None

=== 2005 ===
Tournament	Winner	Runner-up	Score	Third place
Frankfurt	(United States) John McEnroe	(France) Cédric Pioline	6–2, 6–4	(Croatia) Goran Ivanišević
Doha	(Spain) Sergi Bruguera	(Australia) Pat Cash	6–3, 6–1	(France) Cédric Pioline
Hong Kong	(Croatia) Goran Ivanišević	(Australia) Pat Cash	6–2, 6–4	(Austria) Thomas Muster
Rome	(Austria) Thomas Muster	(United States) Jim Courier	6–7, 6–1, [10–4]	(United States) John McEnroe
Novi Vinodolski	(France) Cédric Pioline	(Croatia) Goran Ivanišević	6–3, 7–6(4)	(Austria) Thomas Muster
Algarve	(United States) John McEnroe	(Australia) Pat Cash	6–1, 7–5	(Netherlands) Paul Haarhuis
Seiersberg	(Austria) Thomas Muster	(Croatia) Goran Ivanišević	6–4, 3–6, [10–7]	(Austria) Alex Antonitsch
Paris	(United States) Jim Courier	(France) Cédric Pioline	7–6(4), 6–4	(Spain) Sergi Bruguera
Eindhoven	(Croatia) Goran Ivanišević	(Netherlands) Richard Krajicek	7–6, 7–6	(United States) John McEnroe
Essen	(Croatia) Goran Ivanišević	(United States) John McEnroe	6–3, 6–4	(Sweden) Anders Järryd
London	(Netherlands) Paul Haarhuis	(United States) Jim Courier	6–3, 7–6(2)	None

=== 2006 ===
Tournament	Winner	Runner-up	Score	Third place
Doha	(Chile) Marcelo Ríos	(France) Cédric Pioline	6–2, 6–2	(Netherlands) Richard Krajicek
Hong Kong	(Chile) Marcelo Ríos	(Austria) Thomas Muster	6–3, 6–3	(France) Cédric Pioline
Barcelona	(Spain) Sergi Bruguera	(Spain) Carlos Costa	6–1, 6–4	(Netherlands) Richard Krajicek
Rome	(Italy) Renzo Furlan	(Spain) Sergi Bruguera	6–4, 4–6, [13–11]	(France) Cédric Pioline
Algarve	(Chile) Marcelo Ríos	(United States) John McEnroe	6–2, 6–4	(Germany) Carl-Uwe Steeb
Graz-Seiersberg	(Chile) Marcelo Ríos	(Austria) Thomas Muster	7–6(1), 7–6(5)	(Croatia) Goran Ivanišević
Paris	(Chile) Marcelo Ríos	(Croatia) Goran Ivanišević	7–5, 6–3	(France) Cédric Pioline
Eindhoven	(Chile) Marcelo Ríos	(South Africa) Wayne Ferreira	6–3, 6–1	(Netherlands) Richard Krajicek
Frankfurt	(Croatia) Goran Ivanišević	(United States) John McEnroe	7–6(12), 7–6(1)	(Netherlands) Paul Haarhuis
London	(Netherlands) Paul Haarhuis	(Croatia) Goran Ivanišević	7–6(4), 5–7, [10–7]	None

=== 2007 ===
Tournament	Winner	Runner-up	Score	Third place
Belfast	(Sweden) Anders Järryd	(France) Henri Leconte	6–4, 6–2	
Barcelona	(Spain) Sergi Bruguera	(Spain) Jordi Arrese	4–6, 6–1, [10–2]	(France) Cédric Pioline
Rome	(Spain) Sergi Bruguera	(South Africa) Wayne Ferreira	6–3, 6–4	(France) Henri Leconte
Hamburg	(Spain) Sergi Bruguera	(Austria) Thomas Muster	6–1, 6–4	(Croatia) Goran Ivanišević
Algarve	(Spain) Sergi Bruguera	(Brazil) Fernando Meligeni	6–1, 6–4	(France) Cédric Pioline
Graz	(Germany) Michael Stich	(France) Cédric Pioline	6–2, 4–6, [10–7]	(Austria) Thomas Muster
Paris	(Spain) Sergi Bruguera	(France) Guy Forget	6–4, 6–3	(France) Cédric Pioline
Eindhoven	(Spain) Sergi Bruguera	(Netherlands) Paul Haarhuis	7–6(6), 6–3	(United States) John McEnroe
Liege	(Sweden) Magnus Gustafsson	(France) Henri Leconte	6–4, 6–4	(Netherlands) Paul Haarhuis
Frankfurt	(Netherlands) Paul Haarhuis	(Sweden) Anders Järryd	7–6(6), 6–7(14), [10–8]	(Germany) Michael Stich
São Paulo	(Spain) Sergi Bruguera	(Brazil) Fernando Meligeni	7–6(3), 6–4	(Sweden) Mats Wilander
London	(Netherlands) Paul Haarhuis	(France) Guy Forget	6–1, 6–7, [10–4]	None

=== 2008 ===
Tournament	Winner	Runner-up	Score	Third place
Belfast	(Sweden) Anders Järryd	(Sweden) Mikael Pernfors	6–3, 7–6	None
Barcelona	(Chile) Marcelo Ríos	(Germany) Michael Stich	6–3, 6–3	(France) Cédric Pioline
Rome *	(Austria) Thomas Muster	(France) Henri Leconte	6–3, 6–3	None
Hamburg	(Germany) Michael Stich	(Germany) Marc-Kevin Goellner	6–2, 7–6(4)	(Australia) Pat Cash
São Paulo	(United States) Pete Sampras	(Chile) Marcelo Ríos	6–2, 7–6(5)	(Brazil) Jaime Oncins
Istanbul	(Croatia) Goran Ivanišević	(Brazil) Fernando Meligeni	6–4, 6–4	(France) Cédric Pioline
Graz	(Australia) Patrick Rafter	(Germany) Michael Stich	6–3, 7–6(4)	(France) Henri Leconte
Algarve	(Chile) Marcelo Ríos	(Croatia) Goran Ivanišević	6–4 ret.	(Spain) Sergi Bruguera
Paris	(Sweden) Stefan Edberg	(Spain) Sergi Bruguera	3–6, 7–5, [10–5]	(France) Cédric Pioline
Luxembourg	(United States) John McEnroe	(France) Henri Leconte	6–1, 6–4	(Luxembourg) Johnny Goudenbour
Eindhoven	(Netherlands) Richard Krajicek	(Croatia) Goran Ivanišević	7–6(5), 6–4	(Spain) Sergi Bruguera
Budapest	(Croatia) Goran Ivanišević	(France) Henri Leconte	7–6(0), 6–3	(United States) John McEnroe
London	(France) Cédric Pioline	(United Kingdom) Greg Rusedski	6–7(4), 7–6(3), [11–9]	None

- Only 4 participants

=== 2009 ===
Tournament	Winner	Runner-up	Score	Third place
Barcelona	(Spain) Félix Mantilla	(Spain) Albert Costa	6–4, 6–1	(Sweden) Magnus Gustafsson
São Paulo	(Sweden) Thomas Enqvist	(Brazil) Fernando Meligeni	7–6(3), 6–3	(France) Henri Leconte
Algarve	(United Kingdom) Greg Rusedski	(Sweden) Stefan Edberg	6–3, 6–4	(Brazil) Fernando Meligeni
Paris	(Sweden) Thomas Enqvist	(United States) Michael Chang	6–4, 7–6(5)	(Sweden) Stefan Edberg
Chengdu	(Sweden) Thomas Enqvist	(Croatia) Goran Ivanišević	7–5, 6–2	(Russia) Yevgeny Kafelnikov
London	(Australia) Patrick Rafter	(Sweden) Stefan Edberg	6–7(5), 6–4, [11–9]	None

=== 2010 ===
Tournament	Winner	Runner-up	Score	Third place
Delray Beach	(Australia) Patrick Rafter	(United States) John McEnroe	7–6(4), 7–6(1)	(Sweden) Mats Wilander
Zürich	(Sweden) Stefan Edberg	(Croatia) Goran Ivanišević	3–6, 6–3, [12–10]	(Netherlands) Richard Krajicek
Bogotá	(Sweden) Thomas Enqvist	(South Africa) Wayne Ferreira	7–6(4), 6–4	(Russia) Yevgeny Kafelnikov
Barcelona	(Croatia) Goran Ivanišević	(Sweden) Thomas Enqvist	6–4, 6–4	(Spain) Juan Balcells
São Paulo	(Sweden) Thomas Enqvist	(France) Guy Forget	3–6, 6–4, [10–3]	(Russia) Yevgeny Kafelnikov
Algarve	(Sweden) Thomas Enqvist	(Austria) Thomas Muster	6–4, 6–4	(Croatia) Goran Ivanišević
Knokke	(Croatia) Goran Ivanišević	(Australia) Pat Cash	3–6, 6–3, [10–4]	(France) Guy Forget
Paris	(United States) John McEnroe	(France) Guy Forget	7–5, 6–4	None
Chengdu	(United Kingdom) Greg Rusedski	(United States) Pete Sampras	6–4, 6–2	(Sweden) Thomas Enqvist
Sydney	(Australia) Patrick Rafter	(United States) John McEnroe	6–2, 6–2	(Sweden) Thomas Enqvist
London	(Croatia) Goran Ivanišević	(United States) Todd Martin	6–2, 6–4	None

=== 2011 ===
Tournament	Winner	Runner-up	Score	Third place
Delray Beach	(Australia) Mark Philippoussis	(United States) Aaron Krickstein	6–3, 6–2	None
Zürich	(Australia) Mark Philippoussis	(United Kingdom) Tim Henman	6–3, 7–6(3)	(Croatia) Goran Ivanišević
Bogotá	(Australia) Mark Philippoussis	(Spain) Carlos Moyá	7–5, 6–7(3), [10–4]	(Austria) Thomas Muster
São Paulo	(Spain) Carlos Moyá	(Sweden) Thomas Enqvist	7–6(0), 6-3	(Brazil) Flávio Saretta
Knokke-Heist	(Spain) Carlos Moyá	(Netherlands) Richard Krajicek	6-3, 6-2	(France) Guy Forget
Chengdu	(Spain) Carlos Moyá	(Morocco) Younes El Aynaoui	6-2, 7-6(6)	(United States) Pete Sampras
Santiago	(Spain) Carlos Moyá	(Argentina) Mariano Zabaleta	6–3, 6–4	(Chile) Marcelo Ríos
London	(United Kingdom) Tim Henman	(Sweden) Thomas Enqvist	6–3, 7–6(2)	None

=== 2012 ===
Tournament	Winner	Runner-up	Score	Third place
Delray Beach	(Spain) Carlos Moyá	(United States) Ivan Lendl	6–4, 6–4	(United States) Michael Chang
Stockholm	(United States) John McEnroe	(Sweden) Magnus Larsson	6–3, 3–6, [10–7]	(Croatia) Goran Ivanišević
Zürich	(Spain) Carlos Moyá	(Sweden) Stefan Edberg	3–6, 7–5, [10–8]	(Australia) Mark Philippoussis
Medellín	(Spain) Carlos Moyá	(United Kingdom) Greg Rusedski	6–4, 6–4	(France) Fabrice Santoro
São Paulo	(France) Fabrice Santoro	(Australia) Mark Philippoussis	6–3, 6–4	(Sweden) Thomas Enqvist
Knokke-Heist	(Croatia) Goran Ivanišević	(Sweden) Thomas Enqvist	7–6^{(7–3)}, 2–6, [10–6]	None
London	(France) Fabrice Santoro	(United Kingdom) Tim Henman	7–5, 6–3	None
Rio de Janeiro	(Sweden) Thomas Enqvist	(France) Fabrice Santoro	6–3, 4–6, [10–7]	(Brazil) Marcos Daniel

=== 2013 ===
Tournament	Winner	Runner-up	Score	Third place
Delray Beach	(Spain) Carlos Moyá	(United States) John McEnroe	6–4, 6–2	(United States) Aaron Krickstein
Stockholm	(Sweden) Stefan Edberg	(United States) John McEnroe	6–4, 6–3	(Sweden) Magnus Larsson
Edinburgh	(Sweden) Thomas Enqvist	(Australia) Mark Philippoussis	4–6, 7–5, [10–8]	None
Knokke-Heist	(Croatia) Goran Ivanišević	(France) Guy Forget	6–3, 3–6, [10–4]	None
London	(Australia) Patrick Rafter	(United Kingdom) Tim Henman	6–3, 6–1	None

=== 2014 ===
Tournament	Winner	Runner-up	Score	Third place
Delray Beach	Team USA (United States) Jan-Michael Gambill (United States) Aaron Krickstein (United States) Andy Roddick	Team International (Croatia) Goran Ivanišević (Sweden) Mikael Pernfors (Sweden) Mats Wilander	8–1 (9 ties played)	None
Stockholm	(Sweden) Thomas Enqvist	(Sweden) Stefan Edberg	6–2, 6–3	(Spain) Carlos Moyá
Knokke-Heist	(Belgium) Xavier Malisse	(France) Fabrice Santoro	6–2, 6–3	None
Genoa / Milan *	(Croatia) Goran Ivanišević	(United States) Ivan Lendl	6–4, 6–4	(United States) John McEnroe
London	(Chile) Fernando González	(United States) Andy Roddick	6–4, 2–6, [10–4]	None

- Only 4 participants.

=== 2015 ===
Tournament	Winner	Runner-up	Score	Third place
Delray Beach	Team International (Croatia) Goran Ivanišević (Australia) Mark Philippoussis (Sweden) Mikael Pernfors	Team USA (United States) James Blake (United States) Brad Gilbert (United States) Justin Gimelstob	6–3 (9 ties played)	None
Knokke-Heist	(Belgium) Xavier Malisse	(United States) Pete Sampras	6–7^{(5–7)}, 7–5, [13–11]	(Sweden) Thomas Enqvist
Majorca	(Spain) Àlex Corretja	(Sweden) Thomas Enqvist	3–6, 6–4, [10–7]	(United Kingdom) Tim Henman
Seoul	(Chile) Fernando González	(United States) Michael Chang	7–6^{(7–4)}, 6–2	(Russia) Marat Safin
Monterrey	(United States) Pete Sampras	(United States) John McEnroe	6–3, 7–6^{(7–2)}	(Sweden) Thomas Enqvist
Verona / Modena	(United States) John McEnroe	(Spain) Sergi Bruguera	6–4, 6–3	(Sweden) Mats Wilander
London	(Chile) Fernando González	(United Kingdom) Tim Henman	1–6, 7–6, [10–6]	None

=== 2016 ===
Tournament	Winner	Runner-up	Score	Third place
Delray Beach	Team USA (United States) James Blake (United States) Mardy Fish (United States) Aaron Krickstein	Team International (South Africa) Wayne Ferreira (France) Sébastien Grosjean (Spain) Emilio Sánchez	6–3 (9 ties played)	None
Stockholm	(United States) John McEnroe	(Austria) Thomas Muster	6–2, 6–2	(Sweden) Mats Wilander
Majorca	(Spain) Carlos Moyá	(United Kingdom) Tim Henman	6–4, 7–5	(Spain) Àlex Corretja
Monterrey	(United States) James Blake	(Spain) Juan Carlos Ferrero	3–6, 6–3, [10–2]	(Spain) Carlos Moyá
Mexico City	(Spain) Juan Carlos Ferrero	(United States) Andy Roddick	7–5, 6–1	None
Seoul	(Russia) Marat Safin	(United States) John McEnroe	7–5, 7–5	(United States) Pete Sampras
Bari	(Sweden) Thomas Enqvist	(United States) John McEnroe	6–2, 7–6^{(7–5)}	(France) Henri Leconte
London	(France) Fabrice Santoro	(Belgium) Xavier Malisse	6–4, 2–6, [10–6]	None

=== 2017 ===
Tournament	Winner	Runner-up	Score	Third place
Delray Beach	Team USA (United States) James Blake (United States) Mardy Fish (United States) Vince Spadea	Team International (Sweden) Mikael Pernfors (France) Sébastien Grosjean (Chile) Fernando González	5–2 (7 ties played)	None
Stockholm	(Spain) Juan Carlos Ferrero	(Sweden) Jonas Björkman	6–2, 6–4	(France) Fabrice Santoro
Auchterarder	(United Kingdom) Greg Rusedski	(Sweden) Thomas Enqvist	6–3, 6–4	None
Majorca	(Spain) Carlos Moyá	(Spain) Àlex Corretja	6–3, 6–3	(Chile) Fernando González
Monterrey	(France) Fabrice Santoro	(Croatia) Goran Ivanišević	7–5, 6–3	(United Kingdom) Greg Rusedski
London	(Spain) Juan Carlos Ferrero	(Russia) Marat Safin	6–3, 6–4	(France) Fabrice Santoro

=== 2018 ===
Tournament	Winner	Runner-up	Score	Third place
Delray Beach	Team International (Argentina) Guillermo Cañas (Chile) Fernando González (Canada) Jesse Levine (United Kingdom) Greg Rusedski	Team USA (United States) Jay Berger (United States) Mardy Fish (United States) Jan-Michael Gambill (United States) John McEnroe	6–2 (8 ties played)	None
Brussels	(Belgium) Xavier Malisse	(Australia) Mark Philippoussis	6–7^{(5–7)}, 6–4, [10–8]	None
Auchterarder	(Australia) Mark Philippoussis	(United Kingdom) Tim Henman	7–6^{(7–3)}, 6–3	None
Mallorca	(Germany) Tommy Haas	(Spain) Carlos Moyá	6–4, 6–2	(Spain) Juan Carlos Ferrero
London	(Spain) Juan Carlos Ferrero	(Germany) Tommy Haas	6–3, 7–6^{(7–3)}	(Australia) Mark Philippoussis

=== 2019 ===
Tournament	Winner	Runner-up	Score	Third place
Delray Beach	Team World (South Africa) Wayne Ferreira (Germany) Tommy Haas (United Kingdom) Tim Henman (Sweden) Mikael Pernfors	Team Americas (United States) Jay Berger (United States) Jan-Michael Gambill (Chile) Fernando González (Canada) Jesse Levine	5–3 (8 ties played)	None
Auchterarder	(Spain) Juan Carlos Ferrero	(United Kingdom) Tim Henman	6–3, 6–4	None
Skurup	Team Sweden; Jonas Björkman; Mats Wilander	Team USA (United States) John McEnroe (United States) Patrick McEnroe	2–0 (2 ties played)	Team France; Henri Leconte; Cédric Pioline
Mallorca	(Spain) David Ferrer	(Spain) Juan Carlos Ferrero	7–6^{(7–4)}, 6–3	(Russia) Mikhail Youzhny
London	Team Greg (United Kingdom) Greg Rusedski (Germany) Tommy Haas (Cyprus) Marcos Baghdatis	Team Goran (Croatia) Goran Ivanišević (Belgium) Xavier Malisse (Spain) Juan Carlos Ferrero	3–1 (4 ties played)	Team Tim (United Kingdom) Tim Henman (Spain) David Ferrer (Australia) Mark Philippoussis

=== 2020 ===
Tournament	Winner	Runner-up	Score	Third place
Delray Beach	Team Europe (Germany) Tommy Haas (Spain) David Ferrer (Cyprus) Marcos Baghdatis (Sweden) Mikael Pernfors	Team World (United States) James Blake (Canada) Jesse Levine (United States) Vince Spadea (South Africa) Johan Kriek	5–2 (7 ties played)	None
