= 1993 Davis Cup World Group qualifying round =

Tennis tournament

The 1993 Davis Cup World Group qualifying round was held from 22 to 27 September. They were the main play-offs of the 1993 Davis Cup. The winners of the playoffs advanced to the 1994 Davis Cup World Group, and the losers were relegated to their respective Zonal Regions I.

== Teams ==
Bold indicates team had qualified for the 1993 Davis Cup World Group.

From World Group

- **Austria**
- Brazil
- Cuba
- **Denmark**
- **Russia**
- **Spain**
- Switzerland
- **United States**

From Americas Group I

- Argentina
- Bahamas

From Asia/Oceania Group I

- New Zealand
- South Korea

From Europe/Africa Group I

- **Belgium**
- Croatia
- **Hungary**
- **Israel**

== Results summary ==
Date: 22–27 September

The eight losing teams in the World Group first round ties and eight winners of the Zonal Group I final round ties competed in the World Group qualifying round for spots in the 1994 World Group.

Home team	Score	Visiting team	Location	Venue	Door	Surface	Ref.
**Israel**	3-2	Switzerland	Ramat HaSharon	Canada Stadium	Outdoor	Hard	
**Hungary**	4-1	Argentina	Budapest	Újpesti Torna Egylet	Outdoor	Clay	
New Zealand	2-3	**Austria**	Christchurch	Pioneer Stadium	Indoor	Carpet	
**United States**	5-0	Bahamas	Charlotte, NC	Olde Province Racquet Club	Outdoor	Hard	
**Belgium**	3-1	Brazil	Brussels	Royal Primerose Tennis Club	Outdoor	Clay	
**Denmark**	3-2	Croatia	Copenhagen	K.B. Hallen	Indoor	Carpet	
**Russia**	5-0	Cuba	Saint Petersburg	Sports Forum	Indoor	Carpet	
South Korea	0-5	**Spain**	Seoul	Olympic Park Tennis Center	Outdoor	Hard	

- Austria, Denmark, Russia, Spain and United States remain in the World Group in 1994.
- Belgium, Hungary and Israel are promoted to the World Group in 1994.
- Argentina, Bahamas, Croatia, New Zealand and South Korea remain in Zonal Group I in 1994.
- Brazil, Cuba and Switzerland are relegated to Zonal Group I in 1994.

== Qualifying results ==
=== Israel vs. Switzerland ===
Israel
3
Canada Stadium, Ramat HaSharon, Israel
22–24 September 1993
Hard

Switzerland
2

			1	2	3	4	5
1	(Israel) (Switzerland)	**Amos Mansdorf**; Jakob Hlasek	**7**; 5	**7^{7}** 6^{2}	**6**; 2
2	(Israel) (Switzerland)	Gilad Bloom; **Marc Rosset**	2; **6**	**6**; 4	**6**; 4	4; **6**	2; **6**
3	(Israel) (Switzerland)	Gilad Bloom / Amos Mansdorf; **Jakob Hlasek / Marc Rosset**	2; **6**	2; **6**	2; **6**
4	(Israel) (Switzerland)	**Amos Mansdorf**; Marc Rosset	**6**; 4	6^{4} **7^{7}**	**6**; 3	4; **6**	**6**; 3
5	(Israel) (Switzerland)	**Gilad Bloom**; Jakob Hlasek	**6**; 4	**6**; 1	**6**; 3

=== Hungary vs. Argentina ===
Hungary
4
Újpesti Torna Egylet, Budapest, Hungary
24–26 September 1993
Clay

Argentina
1

			1	2	3	4	5
1	(Hungary) (Argentina)	**Sándor Noszály**; Guillermo Pérez Roldán	**6**; 3	**7**; 5	**6**; 3
2	(Hungary) (Argentina)	**József Krocskó**; Alberto Mancini	**7^{7}** 6^{4}	**6**; 3	**6**; 2
3	(Hungary) (Argentina)	Viktor Nagy / Sándor Noszály; **Pablo Albano / Javier Frana**	6^{2} **7^{7}**	1; **6**	1; **6**
4	(Hungary) (Argentina)	**József Krocskó**; Javier Frana	**6**; 2	**6**; 4	4; **6**	**6**; 3
5	(Hungary) (Argentina)	**Sándor Noszály**; Alberto Mancini	4; **6**	**7^{7}** 6^{4}	**6**; 3

=== New Zealand vs. Austria ===
New Zealand
2
Pioneer Stadium, Christchurch, New Zealand
24–26 September 1993
Carpet (indoors)

Austria
3

			1	2	3	4	5
1	(New Zealand) (Austria)	Brett Steven; **Alex Antonitsch**	5; **7**	4; **6**	4; **6**
2	(New Zealand) (Austria)	Kelly Evernden; **Horst Skoff**	**6**; 3	6^{2} **7^{7}**	**6**; 4	4; **6**	4; **6**
3	(New Zealand) (Austria)	**Kelly Evernden / Brett Steven**; Alex Antonitsch / Thomas Buchmayer	**7**; 5	6^{6} **7^{8}**	**6**; 3	**6**; 2
4	(New Zealand) (Austria)	**Brett Steven**; Horst Skoff	**7^{7}** 6^{3}	**6**; 1	**6**; 3
5	(New Zealand) (Austria)	Kelly Evernden; **Alex Antonitsch**	6^{4} **7^{7}**	**6**; 4	**7^{7}** 6^{2}	6^{5} **7^{7}**	2; **6**

=== United States vs. Bahamas ===
United States
5
Olde Province Racquet Club, Charlotte, NC, United States
24–26 September 1993
Hard

Bahamas
0

			1	2	3	4	5
1	(United States) (The Bahamas)	**Andre Agassi**; Roger Smith	**6**; 2	**6**; 2	**6**; 3
2	(United States) (The Bahamas)	**MaliVai Washington**; Mark Knowles	6^{5} **7^{7}**	**6**; 4	4; **6**	0; 0		**retired**
3	(United States) (The Bahamas)	**Patrick McEnroe / Richey Reneberg**; Mark Knowles / Roger Smith	6^{5} **7^{7}**	**7**; 5	**6**; 4	**6**; 2
4	(United States) (The Bahamas)	**Richey Reneberg**; John Farrington	**6**; 1	**6**; 4
5	(United States) (The Bahamas)	**MaliVai Washington**; Roger Smith	**6**; 1	**6**; 2

=== Belgium vs. Brazil ===
Belgium
3
Royal Primerose Tennis Club, Brussels, Belgium
24–27 September 1993
Clay

Brazil
1

			1	2	3	4	5
1	(Belgium) (Brazil)	**Bart Wuyts**; Jaime Oncins	**6**; 2	**6**; 2	2; **6**	**7**; 5
2	(Belgium) (Brazil)	**Filip Dewulf**; Fernando Meligeni	**6**; 2	**6**; 1	**7**; 5
3	(Belgium) (Brazil)	Tom Vanhoudt / Bart Wuyts; **Luiz Mattar / Cássio Motta**	2; **6**	2; **6**	3; **6**
4	(Belgium) (Brazil)	**Bart Wuyts**; Fernando Meligeni	**6**; 3	1; **6**	**7^{7}** 6^{5}	**7**; 5
5	(Belgium) (Brazil)	Filip Dewulf; Jaime Oncins						**not** **played**

=== Denmark vs. Croatia ===
Denmark
3
K.B. Hallen, Copenhagen, Denmark
24–26 September 1993
Carpet (indoors)

Croatia
2

			1	2	3	4	5
1	(Denmark) (Croatia)	**Kenneth Carlsen**; Goran Prpić	**7^{7}** 6^{3}	**6**; 3	4; **6**	3; **6**	**7**; 5
2	(Denmark) (Croatia)	Frederik Fetterlein; **Goran Ivanišević**	4; **6**	2; **6**	2; **6**
3	(Denmark) (Croatia)	**Kenneth Carlsen / Morten Christensen**; Goran Ivanišević / Goran Prpić	**6**; 3	**6**; 4	3; **6**	6^{4} **7^{7}**	**6**; 4
4	(Denmark) (Croatia)	Kenneth Carlsen; **Goran Ivanišević**	**7^{9}** 6^{7}	5; **7**	2; **6**	5; **7**
5	(Denmark) (Croatia)	**Frederik Fetterlein**; Goran Prpić	**6**; 4	**6**; 3	2; **6**	6; 5		**retired**

=== Russia vs. Cuba ===
Russia
5
Sports Forum, Saint Petersburg, Russia
24–26 September 1993
Carpet (indoors)

Cuba
0

			1	2	3	4	5
1	(Russia) (Cuba)	**Yevgeny Kafelnikov**; Mario Tabares	**6**; 2	**6**; 3	**6**; 2
2	(Russia) (Cuba)	**Andrei Cherkasov**; Juan Pino	**6**; 1	**6**; 2	**6**; 3
3	(Russia) (Cuba)	**Andrei Cherkasov / Andrei Olhovskiy**; Juan Pino / Mario Tabares	**6**; 2	**6**; 4	**6**; 3
4	(Russia) (Cuba)	**Andrei Cherkasov**; Mario Tabares	**7^{11}** 6^{9}	4; **6**	**6**; 4
5	(Russia) (Cuba)	**Yevgeny Kafelnikov**; Juan Pino	**7^{7}** 6^{5}	6^{5} **7^{7}**	**6**; 2

=== South Korea vs. Spain ===
South Korea
0
Olympic Park Tennis Center, Seoul, South Korea
24–26 September 1993
Hard

Spain
5

			1	2	3	4	5
1	(South Korea) (Spain)	Chang Eui-jong; **Sergi Bruguera**	4; **6**	4; **6**	2; **6**
2	(South Korea) (Spain)	Shin Han-cheol; **Carlos Costa**	**7**; 5	1; **6**	2; **6**	0; **6**
3	(South Korea) (Spain)	Chang Eui-jong / Kim Chi-wan; **Tomás Carbonell / Carlos Costa**	3; **6**	2; **6**	**7**; 5	4; **6**
4	(South Korea) (Spain)	Shin Han-cheol; **Sergi Bruguera**	3; **6**	1; **6**
5	(South Korea) (Spain)	Chang Eui-jong; **Alberto Berasategui**	3; **6**	2; **6**

== See also ==
- Davis Cup
