= Forum di Milano =

Indoor multi-purpose arena in Assago, Italy

Unipol Forum

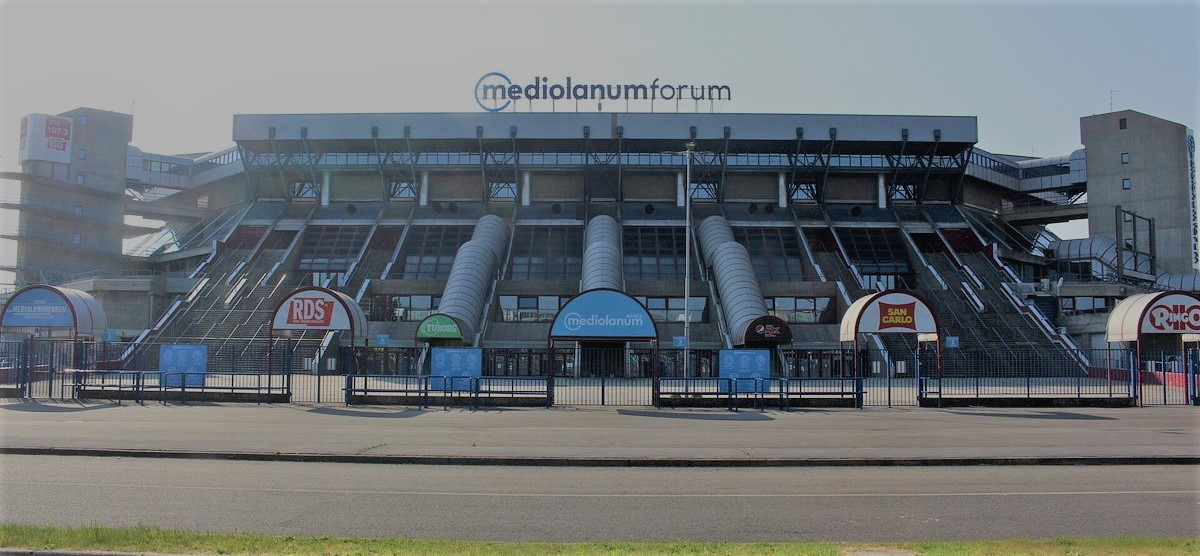
- Interactive map of Unipol Forum
- Full name: Unipol Forum
- Former names: Forum di Assago (1990–93); FilaForum (1993–2006); DatchForum (2006–08); Mediolanum Forum (2009–24)
- Address: Via Giuseppe di Vittorio 6; 20090 Assago, MI, Italy
- Location: Grande Milano
- Coordinates: 45°24′4″N 9°8′32″E
- Owner: ForumNet Group
- Capacity: 15,800

Construction
- Groundbreaking: 1988
- Opened: 26 October 1990
- Renovated: 2014, 2017
- Architects: Giuseppe and Luca Cabassi
- Main contractor: Cabassi Group

Tenant
- Pallacanestro Olimpia Milano (LBA) (1990–present)

Website
- Venue Website

Unipol Forum (formerly the FilaForum, DatchForum and Mediolanum Forum; known as the Forum di Milano in events where commercial naming rights are prohibited) is an indoor sports arena that is located in Assago, a small town 3 km outside Milan, Italy. The arena has an official seated capacity of 12,800, but can hold 15,800 with standing, and is primarily used for basketball, ice hockey, tennis and live concerts.

The venue is the home ground of the EuroLeague and Italian Serie A professional basketball team AX Armani Exchange Milan. In May 2024, the current sponsor, Unipol, took over naming rights in a deal that will run to 2027.

== History ==
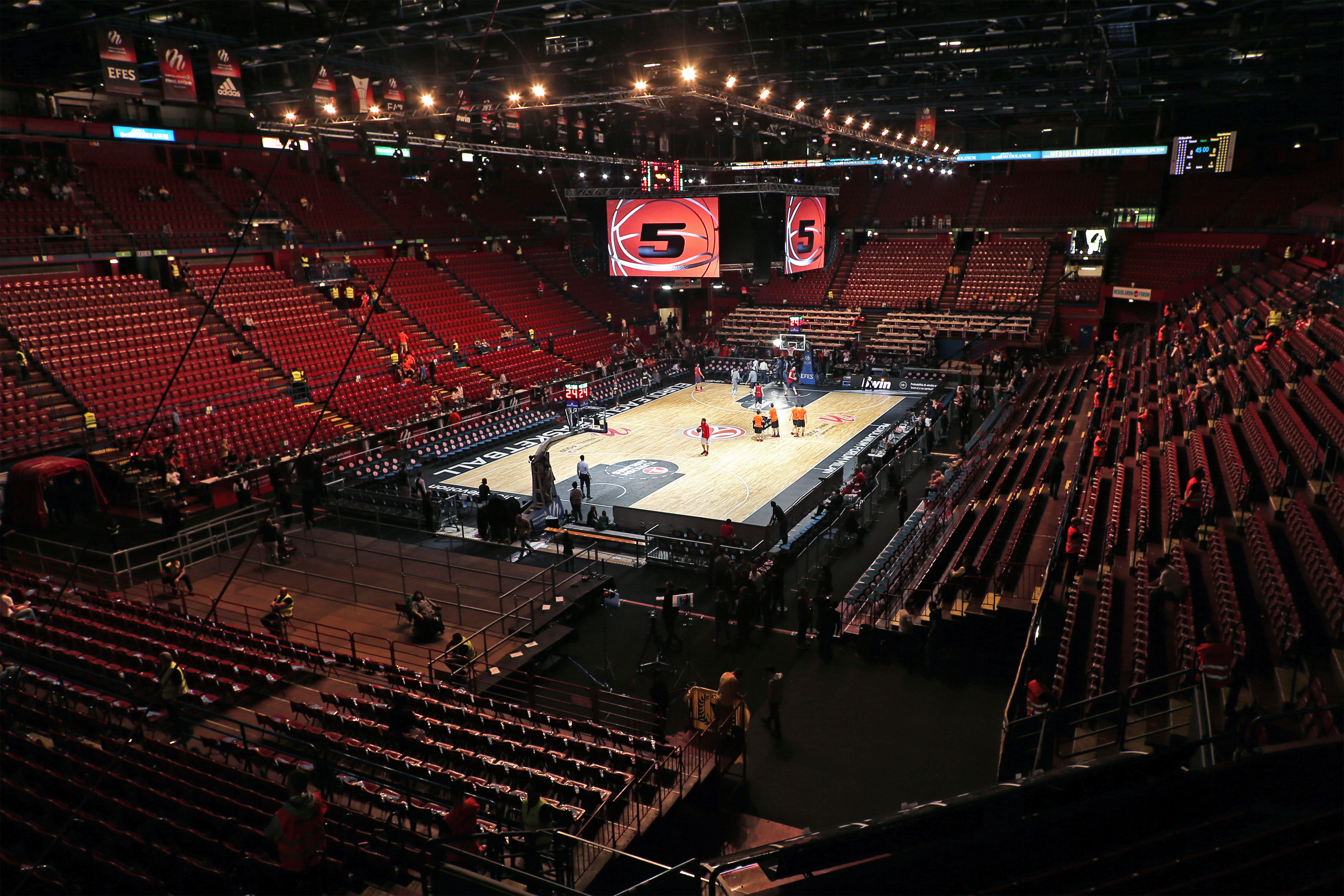
The central arena during the 2014 Euroleague Final Four

The Forum of Assago was built by Giuseppe Cabassi and his son Luca in 1990. It was named in several different way due to different sponsorships during the years: from 1993 to 2006 it was named FilaForum, from 2006 to 2008 DatchForum and then, from 2009 to 2023, MediolanumForum.

The venue is located in the Milanofiori complex and covers 40,000 square metres (430,000 sq ft). The area has four tiers of seating, in addition to luxury suites. The Forum received the 1994 European Prize for Architecture for sports venues awarded by the Italian National Olympic Committee and the Council of Europe. It is also one of two facilities in Italy, along with Palazzo dello Sport in Rome, to be part of the European Arenas Association network.

The arena has been renvoated three times, with the 2014 Euroleague Final Four seeing the arena's seating capacity increase from 11,500 to 12,700, and then re-signage and floor re-grading in 2017.

== Entertainment events ==
Entertainment events at Forum di Milano
Date	Artist	Tour	Opening act
1993
February 18	Paul McCartney	The New World Tour	
February 19	Paul McCartney	The New World Tour	
May 5	Iron Maiden	Real Live Tour	
May 17	Peter Gabriel	Secret World Tour	
November 22	Peter Gabriel	Secret World Tour	
October 7	Whitney Houston	The Bodyguard World Tour	
October 8	Whitney Houston	The Bodyguard World Tour	
1996
May 17	AC/DC	Ballbreaker World Tour	
September 19	Tina Turner	Wildest Dreams Tour	
October 30	Celine Dion	Falling into You: Around the World	
November 1	Gloria Estefan	Evolution Tour	
November 13	Pearl Jam	No Code Tour	Fastbacks
1998
March 8	Spice Girls	Spiceworld Tour	
March 9	Spice Girls	Spiceworld Tour	
May 5	Janet Jackson	The Velvet Rope Tour	Another Level
1999
June 23	Alanis Morissette	Junkie Tour	
September 23	Iron Maiden	The Ed Hunter Tour	
2000
February 17	Mariah Carey	Rainbow World Tour	
May 23	Santana	Supernatural Tour	
June 13	Madonna	Drowned World Tour	
June 14	Madonna	Drowned World Tour	
June 15	Madonna	Drowned World Tour	
June 22	Pearl Jam	Binaural Tour	The Dismemberment Plan
October 24	Britney Spears	Oops!... I Did It Again Tour	
2002
June 18	Kylie Minogue	KylieFever2002	
November 18	Coldplay	A Rush of Blood to the Head Tour	1 Giant Leap
2003
April 17	Shakira	Tour of the Mongoose	
May 8	Peter Gabriel	Growing Up Tour / Growing Up Live DVD	
May 9	Peter Gabriel	Growing Up Tour / Growing Up Live DVD	
October 20	Christina Aguilera	Stripped World Tour	So Solid Crew
October 27	Iron Maiden	Dance of Death World Tour	
November 10	Mariah Carey	Charmbracelet World Tour	
2004
May 11	Peter Gabriel	Still Growing Up Tour	
May 19	Britney Spears	The Onyx Hotel Tour	
October 16	Avril Lavigne	Bonez Tour	
2005
May 26	Destinys Child	Destiny Fulfilled... and Lovin' It	
November 14	Coldplay	Twisted Logic Tour	Goldfrapp
2006
September 17	Pearl Jam	2006 World Tour	
December 2	Iron Maiden	A Matter of Life and Death Tour	
December 3	Iron Maiden	A Matter of Life and Death Tour	
December 4	Muse	Black Holes and Revelations Tour	Noisettes
2007
February 27	Shakira	Oral Fixation Tour	
May 10	Beyoncé	The Beyonce Experience	Lemar
June 1	Justin Timberlake	FutureSex/LoveShow	
October 16	Gwen Stefani	The Sweet Escape Tour	CSS
2008
March 29	Alicia Keys	As I Am Tour	
June 13	Avril Lavigne	The Best Damn World Tour	Jonas Brothers
July 3	Celine Dion	Taking Chances World Tour	
September 30	Coldplay	Viva la Vida Tour	High Wire; Albert Hammond Jr.
2009
March 19	AC/DC	Black Ice World Tour	The Answer
March 21	AC/DC	Black Ice World Tour	The Answer
July 16	Gloria Estefan	90 Millas World Tour	
2010
March 16	The Cranberries	20 Years Tour	Outside Royalty
April 12	Tokio Hotel	Humanoid City World Tour	
May 3	Whitney Houston	Nothing but Love World Tour	Karima
May 12	The Black Eyed Peas	The E.N.D. World Tour	Cheryl Cole
2011
March 11	Kylie Minogue	Aphrodite World Tour	
March 15	Taylor Swift	Speak Now World Tour	Emma Marrone
May 3	Shakira	The Sun Comes Out World Tour	
September 11	Avril Lavigne	The Blackstar Tour	
December 11	Rihanna	Loud Tour	
2012
May 7	LMFAO	Sorry for Party Rocking Tour	
October 2	Lady Gaga	Born This Way Ball	The Darkness; Lady Starlight
October 29	The Cranberries	Roses Tour	
2013
February 23	Cirque de Soleil	Michael Jackson: The Immortal World Tour	
February 24	Cirque de Soleil	Michael Jackson: The Immortal World Tour	
May 7	Lana Del Rey	Paradise Tour	Kassidy
May 18	Beyoncé	The Mrs. Carter Show World Tour	Luke James
May 20	One Direction	Take Me Home Tour	Camryn
October 7	Peter Gabriel	Back to Front Tour	
October 29	Nickelback	Here and Now Tour	
November 2	Thirty Seconds to Mars	Love Lust Faith and Dream Tour	You Me at Six; Twin Atlantic
2014
January 3	Violetta	Violetta - Il concerto	
January 4	Violetta	Violetta - Il concerto	
January 5	Violetta	Violetta - Il concerto	
June 8	Miley Cyrus	Bangerz Tour	
November 4	Lady Gaga	ArtRave: The Artpop Ball	Lady Starlight
November 17	OneRepublic	Native Tour	
2015
January 25	Ed Sheeran	x Tour	
January 30	Violetta	Violetta Live	
January 31	Violetta	Violetta Live	
February 13	Lionel Richie	All the Hits, All Night Long	Marion Raven
February 21	Katy Perry	Prismatic World Tour	Charli XCX
May 9	5 Seconds of Summer	Rock Out with Your Socks Out Tour	Hey Violet
May 25	Ariana Grande	The Honeymoon Tour	Rixton
June 12	Maroon 5	Maroon V Tour	Magic! Nick Gardner; Mike Watson
2016
February 1	Ellie Goulding	Delirium World Tour	Sara Hartman
May 14	Muse	Drones World Tour	De Staat
May 15	Muse	Drones World Tour	De Staat
May 17	Muse	Drones World Tour	De Staat
May 18	Muse	Drones World Tour	De Staat
May 20	Muse	Drones World Tour	De Staat
May 21	Muse	Drones World Tour	De Staat
July 22	Iron Maiden	The Book of Souls World Tour	Anthrax; Sabaton
November 7	Twenty One Pilots	Emotional Roadshow World Tour	Bry
2017
February 21	Avenged Sevenfold		
March 28	Tini Stoessel	Got Me Started Tour	
May 6	Shawn Mendes	Illuminate World Tour	James TW
May 20	Enrique Iglesias	Sex and Love Tour	
May 30	Little Mix	The Glory Days Tour	The Vamps
June 15	Bruno Mars	24K Magic World Tour	Anderson Paak
December 19	Elio e le Storie Tese	Farewell Concert	
2018
January 18	Lady Gaga	Joanne World Tour	
January 20	David Guetta	European Arena Tour 2018	
January 27	Depeche Mode	Global Spirit Tour	Algiers
February 2	Soy Luna cast	Soy Luna Live	
February 3	Soy Luna cast	Soy Luna Live	
April 2	Harry Styles	Harry Styles: Live on Tour	Mabel
April 11	Lana Del Rey	LA to the Moon Tour	Cat Power
May 7	Niall Horan	Flicker World Tour	Julia Michaels
May 11	Sam Smith	The Thrill of It All Tour	
June 4	Arctic Monkeys	Tranquility Base Hotel & Casino Tour	Cameron Avery
June 21	Shakira	El Dorado World Tour	Salva
June 25	Queen	Queen + Adam Lambert	
October 11	U2	Experience + Innocence Tour	
October 12	U2	Experience + Innocence Tour	
October 15	U2	Experience + Innocence Tour	
October 16	U2	Experience + Innocence Tour	
2019
June 17	Phil Collins	Not Dead Yet Tour	
September 18	Little Mix	LM5: The Tour	Keelie Walker
2020
June 6	Eric Clapton	Summer European Tour 2020	
2022
April 10	Louis Tomlinson	Louis Tomlinson World Tour	Only The Poets
May 25	Dua Lipa	Future Nostalgia Tour	Griff
May 26	Dua Lipa	Future Nostalgia Tour	Griff
2023
April 24	Avril Lavigne	Love Sux Tour	Girlfriends; Phem
September 10	Various ASAP artists	ASAP Live in Milan	
September 12	Björk	Cornucopia	
October 22	50 Cent	The Final Lap Tour	Busta Rhymes
November 23	Madonna	The Celebration Tour	Stuart Price; Bob the Drag Queen
November 25	Madonna	The Celebration Tour	Stuart Price; Bob the Drag Queen
2024
February 22	Kanye West & Various artists	Vultures 1 Listening Party	
March 21	Niall Horan	The Show: Live on Tour	Tommy Lefroy
May 28	Jonas Brothers	Five Albums. One Night. The World Tour	Mimi Webb
2025
January 20	Ateez	Towards The Light: Will To Power Tour	
March 26	Sabrina Carpenter	Short n' Sweet Tour	Rachel Chinouriri
July 2	Ado	Hibana World Tour	
October 19	Lady Gaga	The Mayhem Ball	
October 20	Lady Gaga	The Mayhem Ball	
November 26	Big Time Rush	In Real Life Worldwide Tour	
2026
April 3	Various artists	K-Pop Forever!	
April 25	Various artists	K-Pop Forever!	

== Sports ==
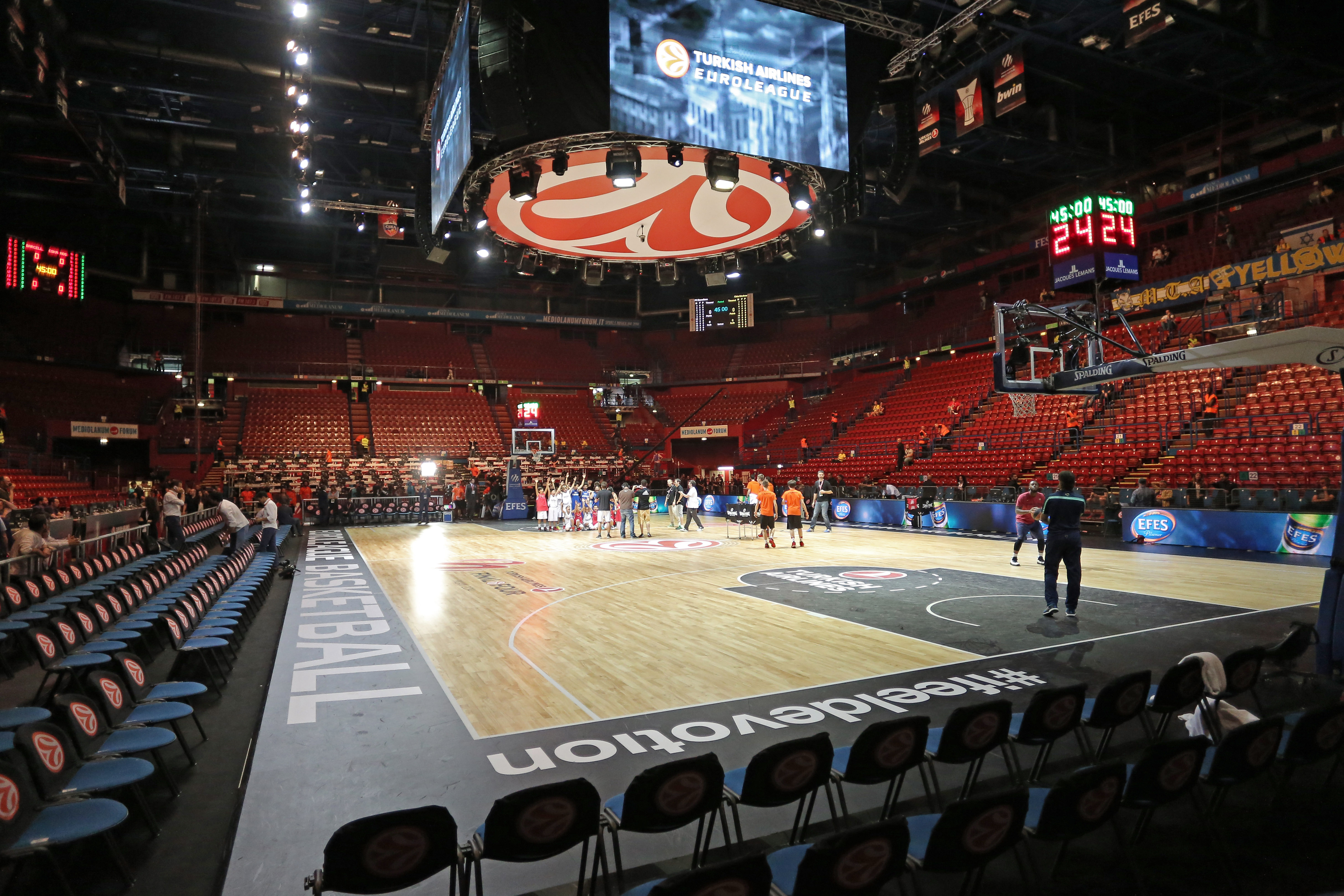
2014 Euroleague Final Four

The arena has hosted the 1994 Men's World Ice Hockey Championships, the 2003 IIHF Continental Cup Superfinal of ice hockey (together with Lugano's Pista La Resega), WWE Raw and WWE SmackDown in 2007, and the 2009 World Amateur Boxing Championships.

Since 2011, the Forum has also been home to La Grande Sfida, an annual tennis exhibition event played every Christmas. The arena also hosted the EuroLeague Final Four in 2014.

The forum was the venue for the 2018 World Figure Skating Championships.

Some matches of the 2018 FIVB Volleyball World Championship were held at the venue. The venue also hosted some group phase matches of the FIBA EuroBasket 2022 which Italy hosted alongside Czech Republic in Prague, Georgia in Tbilisi and Germany in Berlin and Cologne.

In July 2024 the 19th World Kendo Championship was held at the forum. In February 2025, the 6th stage of the ISU Short Track World Tour is held at the Forum.

It also hosted figure skating and short-track speed skating during the 2026 Winter Olympics.

== See also ==
- List of tennis stadiums by capacity
- List of indoor arenas in Italy

Preceded by Olympiahalle; Munich	Ice Hockey World Championships; Final Venue; 1994	Succeeded by Globe Arena; Stockholm
Preceded by Scandinavium; Gothenburg	Davis Cup; Final Venue; 1998	Succeeded by Acropolis Exhibition Hall; Nice
Preceded by Ahoy; Rotterdam	MTV Europe Music Awards; Venue; 1998	Succeeded by Point Depot; Dublin
Preceded by Hala Opole; Opole	CEV Champions League; Final Venue; 2003	Succeeded by Sports Palace Cosmos; Belgorod
Preceded by The O2 Arena; London	Euroleague; Final Four; Venue; 2014	Succeeded by Palacio de los Deportes; Madrid
Preceded by The Hydro; Glasgow	MTV Europe Music Awards; Venue; 2015	Succeeded by Rotterdam Ahoy; Rotterdam
