= 2009 Seniors Torneo Godó =

- 2009 Barcelona Open Banco Sabadell

Final
- Champion: (Spain) Félix Mantilla
- Runner-up: (Spain) Albert Costa
- Score: 6–4, 6–1

Events
Singles	Doubles
- Barcelona Open

The 2009 Seniors Torneo Godó was the fourth edition of the Seniors Torneo Godó and it took place from April 15–19, 2009.

Tie-breaks were used for the first two sets of each match, which was the best of three sets. If the score was tied at one set all, a "champions tie break" (the first player to win at least 10 points or by a margin of two points) would be used.

Marcelo Ríos was the defending champion, but did not compete this year to focus on an exhibition match against Andy Roddick.

Félix Mantilla won the title by defeating Albert Costa 6–4, 6–1 in the final. Magnus Gustafsson took the third place.

== Draw ==
For a player to be eligible for play on this tour, he must be in the year of his 35th birthday or have been retired from the ATP World Tour for two years or more. Each player must have been either a world No. 1, a Grand Slam finalist, or a singles player in a winning Davis Cup team. Each event can also invite two players of its choice to take wild cards.

The main draw was announced on 7 April.

Player	Age*	Ranking	Grand Slams	Davis Cup	Entry criteria
(Australia) Pat Cash	43 years, 323 days	No. 4 (May 1988)	Champion (1987 Wimbledon)	Champion (1983, 1986)	Eligible
(Spain) Albert Costa	33 years, 294 days (retired in 2006)	No. 6 (July 2002)	Champion (2002 French Open)	Champion (2000)	Eligible
(Sweden) Magnus Gustafsson	42 years, 102 days	No. 10 (July 1991)	Quarterfinals (1994 Australian Open)	Champion (1998)	Eligible
(Sweden) Anders Järryd	47 years, 276 days	No. 5 (July 1985)	Semifinals (1985 Wimbledon)	Champion (1987)	Eligible
(Netherlands) Richard Krajicek	37 years, 130 days	No. 4 (March 1999)	Champion (1996 Wimbledon)	Quarterfinals (1993, 1994, 1995)	Eligible
(Spain) Félix Mantilla	34 years, 204 days (retired in 2008)	No. 10 (June 1998)	Semifinals (1998 French Open)	Play-offs (1999)	Wild card
(France) Cédric Pioline	39 years, 304 days	No. 5 (May 2000)	Runner-up (USO '93, WIM '97)	Champion (1996)	Eligible
(Germany) Michael Stich	40 years, 179 days	No. 2 (November 1993)	Champion (1991 Wimbledon)	Champion (1993)	Eligible

* - at start of tournament.

=== Group stage ===
==== Group A ====
	(Australia) Cash	(Spain) Costa	(Sweden) Järryd	(Netherlands) Krajicek	RR W–L	Set W–L	Game W–L	Standings
(Australia) Pat Cash		4–6, 4–6	1–6, 2–6	Withdrew	0–3	0–4 (0.0%)	11–24 (31.4%)	4
(Spain) Albert Costa	6–4, 6–4		7–5, 6–4	6–3, 4–6, [10–6]	3–0	6–1 (85.8%)	36–26 (58.1%)	1st place, gold medalist(s)
(Sweden) Anders Järryd	6–2, 6–1	5–7, 4–6		6–4, 6–1	2–1	4–2 (66.6%)	33–21 (61.1%)	2nd place, silver medalist(s)
(Netherlands) Richard Krajicek	Walkover	3–6, 6–4, [6–10]	4–6, 1–6		1–2	3–4 (42.9%)	14–23 (37.8%)	3

Cash had to withdraw before his match against Krajicek due to a foot injury.

==== Group B ====
		(Sweden) Gustafsson	(Spain) Mantilla	(France) Pioline	(Germany) Stich	RR W–L	Set W–L	Game W–L	Standings
	(Sweden) Magnus Gustafsson		1–6, 4–6	6–4, 4–6, [10–8]	6–3, 7–6^{(8–6)}	2–1	4–3 (57.1%)	29–31 (48.3%)	2nd place, silver medalist(s)
WC	(Spain) Félix Mantilla	6–4, 6–1		6–4, 6–0	6–3, 6–3	3–0	6–0 (100%)	36–15 (70.6%)	1st place, gold medalist(s)
	(France) Cédric Pioline	4–6, 6–4, [8–10]	0–6, 4–6		6–1, 6–2	1–2	3–4 (42.9%)	26–26 (50.0%)	3
	(Germany) Michael Stich	3–6, 6–7^{(6–8)}	3–6, 3–6	1–6, 2–6		0–3	0–6 (0.0%)	18–37 (32.7%)	4

=== Final four ===
==== Third-place playoff ====
Third-place playoff
(Sweden) Magnus Gustafsson	6^{3}	6	[11]
(Sweden) Anders Järryd	7^{7}	2	[9]

==== Final ====
Final
(Spain) Félix Mantilla (WC)	6	6
(Spain) Albert Costa	4	1
