= 2008 Seniors Torneo Godó =

- 2008 Open Sabadell Atlántico Barcelona

Final
- Champion: (Chile) Marcelo Ríos
- Runner-up: (Germany) Michael Stich
- Score: 6–3, 6–3

Details
- Draw: 8

Events
Singles	Doubles
- Barcelona Open

The 2008 Seniors Torneo Godó was the third edition of the Seniors Torneo Godó and it took place from April 24–28, 2008.

Tie-breaks were used for the first two sets of each match, which was the best of three sets. If the score was tied at one set all, a "champions tie break" (the first player to win at least 10 points or by a margin of two points) would be used.

Sergi Bruguera was the two-time defending champion, but had to withdraw (due to an injury) before his 3rd match of the round robin.

Marcelo Ríos won the title by defeating Michael Stich 6–3, 6–3 in the final. Cédric Pioline took the third place.

== Draw ==
For a player to be eligible for play on this tour, he must be in the year of his 35th birthday or have been retired from the ATP Tour for two years or more. Each player must have been either a world No. 1, a Grand Slam finalist, or a singles player in a winning Davis Cup team. Each event can also invite two players of its choice to take wild cards.

The main draw was announced on 23 April.

Player	Age*	Ranking	Grand Slams	Davis Cup	Entry criteria
(Spain) Sergi Bruguera	37 years, 99 days	No. 3 (August 1994)	Champion (RG '93, RG '94)	Quarterfinals (1994)	Eligible
(Spain) Albert Costa	32 years, 304 days (retired in 2006)	No. 6 (July 2002)	Champion (2002 French Open)	Champion (2000)	Eligible
(Sweden) Magnus Larsson	38 years, 30 days	No. 10 (April 1995)	Semifinals (1994 French Open)	Champion (1994, 1997)	Eligible
(France) Henri Leconte	44 years, 295 days	No. 5 (September 1986)	Runner-up (1988 French Open)	Champion (1991)	Eligible
(France) Cédric Pioline	38 years, 314 days	No. 5 (May 2000)	Runner-up (USO '93, WIM '97)	Champion (1996)	Eligible
(Chile) Marcelo Ríos	32 years, 120 days (retired in 2004)	No. 1 (March 1998)	Runner-up (1998 Australian Open)	Play-offs (1997, 1999, 2001)	Eligible
(Germany) Carl-Uwe Steeb	40 years, 236 days	No. 14 (January 1990)	Fourth round (AO '88, USO '91, RG '92)	Champion (1988, 1989, 1993)	Eligible
(Germany) Michael Stich	39 years, 189 days	No. 2 (November 1993)	Champion (1991 Wimbledon)	Champion (1993)	Eligible
Withdrew before the tournament
(Sweden) Magnus Gustafsson	41 years, 112 days	No. 10 (July 1991)	Quarterfinals (1994 Australian Open)	Champion (1998)	Withdrew
(Spain) Emilio Sánchez	42 years, 331 days	No. 7 (April 1990)	Quarterfinals (RG '88 and USO '88)	Semifinals (1987)	Withdrew

* - at start of tournament.

=== Group stage ===
==== Group A ====
	(Spain) Costa	(Sweden) Larsson	(France) Leconte	(Germany) Stich	RR W–L	Set W–L	Game W–L	Standings
(Spain) Albert Costa		7–6, 6–4	6–3, 6–2	3–6, 4–6	2–1	4–2 (66.7%)	32–27 (54.2%)	2nd place, silver medalist(s)
(Sweden) Magnus Larsson	6–7, 4–6		6–3, 4–6, [10–7]	6–3, 7–6^{(7–3)}	2–1	4–3 (57.1%)	34–31 (52.3%)	3
(France) Henri Leconte	3–6, 2–6	3–6, 6–4, [7–10]		3–6, 4–6	0–3	1–6 (14.3%)	21–35 (37.5%)	4
(Germany) Michael Stich	6–3, 6–4	3–6, 6–7^{(3–7)}	6–3, 6–4		2–1	4–2 (66.7%)	33–25 (56.9%)	1st place, gold medalist(s)

==== Group B ====
	(Spain) Bruguera	(France) Pioline	(Chile) Ríos	(Germany) Steeb	RR W–L	Set W–L	Game W–L	Standings
(Spain) Sergi Bruguera		6–4, 6–1	Withdrew	6–2, 6–1	2–1	4–0 (100%)	24–8 (75.0%)	X
(France) Cédric Pioline	1–6, 4–6		6–3, 3–6, [7–10]	6–1, 6–4	1–2	3–4 (42.9%)	26–27 (49.1%)	2nd place, silver medalist(s)
(Chile) Marcelo Ríos	Walkover	3–6, 6–3, [10–7]		6–1, 6–2	3–0	4–1 (80.0%)	22–12 (64.7%)	1st place, gold medalist(s)
(Germany) Carl-Uwe Steeb	2–6, 1–6	1–6, 4–6	1–6, 2–6		0–3	0–6 (0.0%)	11–36 (23.4%)	3

Bruguera had to withdraw before his match against Ríos due to a right knee injury.

=== Final four ===
==== Third-place playoff ====
Third-place playoff
(France) Cédric Pioline	7^{7}	3
(Spain) Albert Costa	6^{5}	1^{r}

==== Final ====
Final
(Chile) Marcelo Ríos	6	6
(Germany) Michael Stich	3	3

=== Exhibition match ===
Exhibition match
(Chile) Marcelo Ríos	7
(Spain) Alberto Martín (Alt.)	6
