= 2007 Seniors Torneo Godó =

- 2007 Torneo Godó

Final
- Champion: (Spain) Sergi Bruguera
- Runner-up: (Spain) Jordi Arrese
- Score: 4–6, 6–1, [10–2]

Details
- Draw: 8

Events
Singles	Doubles
- Barcelona Open

The 2007 Seniors Torneo Godó was the second edition of the Seniors Torneo Godó and it took place from April 19–22, 2007.

Tie breaks were used for the first two sets of each match, which was the best of three sets. If the score was tied at one set all, a "champions tie break" (the first player to win at least 10 points or by a margin of two points) would be used.

Sergi Bruguera successfully defended his title by defeating Jordi Arrese 4–6, 6–1, [10–2] in an all-Spaniard final. Cédric Pioline took the third place.

== Draw ==
The list of players was confirmed in March 2007. The draw was announced on 12 April.

For a player to be eligible for play on this tour, he must be in the year of his 35th birthday or have been retired from the ATP Tour for two years or more. Each player must have been either a world No. 1, a Grand Slam finalist, or a singles player in a winning Davis Cup team. Each event can also invite two players of its choice to take wild cards.

Player	Age*	Ranking	Grand Slams	Davis Cup	Entry criteria
(Spain) Jordi Arrese	42 years, 233 days	No. 23 (November 1991)	Third round (RG '85, RG '87, RG '90, RG '93)	Quarterfinals (1989)	Wild card
(Spain) Sergi Bruguera	36 years, 93 days	No. 3 (August 1994)	Champion (RG '93, RG '94)	Quarterfinals (1994)	Eligible
(Netherlands) Richard Krajicek	35 years, 134 days	No. 4 (March 1999)	Champion (1996 Wimbledon)	Quarterfinals (1993, 1994, 1995)	Eligible
(France) Henri Leconte	43 years, 289 days	No. 5 (September 1986)	Runner-up (1988 French Open)	Champion (1991)	Eligible
(United States) John McEnroe	48 years, 62 days	No. 1 (March 1990)	Champion (7 Grand Slam titles)	Champion ('78, '79, '81, '82)	Eligible
(Austria) Thomas Muster	39 years, 199 days	No. 1 (February 1996)	Champion (1995 French Open)	Semifinals (1990)	Eligible
(France) Cédric Pioline	37 years, 308 days	No. 5 (May 2000)	Runner-up (USO '93, WIM '97)	Champion (1996, 2001)	Eligible
(Germany) Carl-Uwe Steeb	39 years, 230 days	No. 14 (January 1990)	Fourth round (AO '88, USO '91, RG '92)	Champion (1988, 1989, 1993)	Eligible
Initially considered, but withdrew due to injury
(Spain) Emilio Sánchez	41 years, 325 days	No. 7 (April 1990)	Quarterfinals (RG '88 and USO '88)	Semifinals (1987)	Withdrew

* - at start of tournament.

=== Group stage ===
==== Blue Group ====
Player	(Spain) Bruguera	(Netherlands) Krajicek	(United States) McEnroe	(Germany) Steeb	RR; W–L	Set; W–L	Game; W–L	Standings
(Spain) Sergi Bruguera		4–6, 6–2, [10–6]	6–4, 6–2	6–3, 6–0	3–0	6–1 (85.7%)	35–17 (67.3%)	1st place, gold medalist(s)
(Netherlands) Richard Krajicek	6–4, 2–6, [6–10]		4–6, 1–2, ret.	not played	0–2	1–3 (25.0%)	13–19 (40.6%)	X
(United States) John McEnroe	4–6, 2–6	6–4, 2–1, ret.		4–6, 6–7^{(9–11)}	1–2	1–4 (20.0%)	24–30 (44.4%)	2nd place, silver medalist(s)
(Germany) Carl-Uwe Steeb	3–6, 0–6	not played	6–4, 7–6^{(11–9)}		1–1	2–2 (50.0%)	16–22 (42.1%)	3

Krajicek had to withdraw before his match against Steeb due to an injury.

==== Red Group ====
	Player	(Spain) Arrese	(France) Leconte	(Austria) Muster	(France) Pioline	RR; W–L	Set; W–L	Game; W–L	Standings
WC	(Spain) Jordi Arrese		6–2, 3–6, [10–8]	6–0, 4–6, [10–8]	1–6, 6–3, [10–7]	3–0	6–3 (66.6%)	29–23 (55.8%)	1st place, gold medalist(s)
	(France) Henri Leconte	2–6, 6–3, [8–10]		4–6, 4–6	2–6, 6–2, [10–8]	1–2	3–5 (37.5%)	25–30 (45.5%)	4
	(Austria) Thomas Muster	0–6, 6–4, [8–10]	6–4, 6–4		4–6, 3–6	1–2	3–4 (42.9%)	25–31 (44.6%)	3
	(France) Cédric Pioline	6–1, 3–6, [7–10]	6–2, 2–6, [8–10]	6–4, 6–3		1–2	4–4 (50.0%)	29–24 (54.7%)	2nd place, silver medalist(s)

=== Final four ===
==== Third-place playoff ====
Third-place playoff
(France) Cédric Pioline	6	7
(United States) John McEnroe	2	5

==== Final ====
Final
(Spain) Sergi Bruguera	4	6	[10]
(Spain) Jordi Arrese (WC)	6	1	[2]
