= La Grande Sfida =

Women's exhibition tennis tournament

La Grande Sfida is a women's exhibition tennis tournament held at the Mediolanum Forum and hosted by the Boscolo Hotel in Milan (for the first two editions). The first edition was held on 3 December, 2011. The second edition was held on 1 December, 2012. The third edition was held on 17 in Genoa and 18 October in Milan, 2014. The fourth edition will be held on 20 in Verona and 22 November in Modena, 2015.

== 2011 La Grande Sfida ==
The inaugural event this year featured the Williams sisters as well as 2010 French Open champion Francesca Schiavone and 2011 US Open quarter-finalist Flavia Pennetta.

=== Players ===
Team	Player 1	Player 2	Result
ITA	Francesca Schiavone	Flavia Pennetta	3
USA	Venus Williams	Serena Williams	2

=== Matches ===
3 December 2011; 15:30 (CET)	Italy	3–2	United States	Mediolanum Forum, Milan; Attendance: 11,000

Report	Individual matches
Flavia Pennetta	1–2	Serena Williams	[8–6], [3–7], [3–7]
Francesca Schiavone	2–0	Venus Williams	[7–5], [7–3]
Flavia Pennetta / Francesca Schiavone	1–2	Serena Williams / Venus Williams	[7–3], [6–8], [6–8]
Flavia Pennetta	2–0	Venus Williams	[8–6], [7–2]
Francesca Schiavone	2–1	Serena Williams	[7–3], [8–10], [8–6]

== 2012 La Grande Sfida ==
The 2012 edition was held on December 1, 2012, in Milan, Italy. This year's players featured French Open finalists Sara Errani and Maria Sharapova as well as US Open quarter-finalists Roberta Vinci and Ana Ivanovic.

The first match, between Ana Ivanovic and Roberta Vinci, was a repeat of their second round match from the Rogers Cup earlier in the year in which Vinci won 6–0, 6–0. However, this time Ivanovic would gain her revenge, winning in a 12-point tiebreak.

The second match, between Maria Sharapova and Sara Errani, was a repeat of their French Open final in which Sharapova won to complete a Career Grand Slam. Sharapova was once again victorious, by a scoreline of 6–2.

The Italians would then gain their revenge over Ivanovic and Sharapova by scoring a 6–4 victory in the doubles rubber.

=== Players ===
Player 1	Player 2	Result
(Italy) Sara Errani	(Italy) Roberta Vinci	1
(Serbia) Ana Ivanovic	(Russia) Maria Sharapova	2

=== Matches ===
1 December 2012; 16:00 (CET)	Report	Italy	1–2	Russia and Serbia	Mediolanum Forum, Milan; Attendance: 12,000
Score by game:
Roberta Vinci	6–7^{(5–7)}	Ana Ivanovic
Sara Errani	2–6	Maria Sharapova
Sara Errani / Roberta Vinci	6–4	Ana Ivanovic / Maria Sharapova

== 2014 La Grande Sfida ==
The 2014 edition was held on 17 October 2014 in Genoa and on 18 October 2014 in Milan, Italy. The event featured four legends of the ATP Champions Tour: the 8-time Grand Slam champion Ivan Lendl, Wimbledon champion Goran Ivanišević, French Open champion Michael Chang and 7-time Grand Slam champion John McEnroe.

The semifinals were held in Genoa, while the final and the 3rd place final were played the day after in Milan.

=== Players ===
Player 1	Result	Player 2	Result	Player 3	Result	Player 4	Result
(Croatia) Goran Ivanišević	Champion	(United States) Ivan Lendl	Runner-up	(United States) John McEnroe	3rd Place	(United States) Michael Chang	4th Place

=== Draw ===
Semifinals (Genoa)
(United States) John McEnroe	2	6^{3}
(Croatia) Goran Ivanišević	6	7^{7}
(United States) Michael Chang	4	2
(United States) Ivan Lendl	6	6

Final (Milan)
(Croatia) Goran Ivanišević	6	6
(United States) Ivan Lendl	4	4
3rd/4th place Play-off
(United States) John McEnroe	6	6
(United States) Michael Chang	3	3

== 2015 La Grande Sfida ==
The 2015 edition was held on 20 November 2015 in Verona and 22 November 2015 in Modena, Italy. The event featured 4 legends of the ATP Champions Tour: the 7-time Grand Slam champion Mats Wilander, French Open champion Sergi Bruguera, French Open finalist Henri Leconte and 7-time Grand Slam champion John McEnroe.

=== Players ===
Player 1	Result	Player 2	Result	Player 3	Result	Player 4	Result
(United States) John McEnroe	Champion	(Spain) Sergi Bruguera	Runner-up	(Sweden) Mats Wilander	3rd Place	(France) Henri Leconte	4th Place

=== Draw ===
Semifinals (Verona)
(France) Henri Leconte	3	6^{2}
(Spain) Sergi Bruguera	6	7^{7}
(Sweden) Mats Wilander	2	4
(United States) John McEnroe	6	6

Final (Modena)
(Spain) Sergi Bruguera	3	4
(United States) John McEnroe	6	6
3rd/4th Place play-off
(France) Henri Leconte	5	6	[5]
(Sweden) Mats Wilander	7	2	[10]

== 2016 La Grande Sfida ==
The 2016 edition was held from 19 to 20 November 2015 in Bari, Italy. The event featured 4 legends of the ATP Champions Tour: the 7-time Grand Slam champion John McEnroe, French Open finalist Henri Leconte, Australian Open finalist Thomas Enqvist and French Open champion Thomas Muster.

Thomas Enqvist won the title by defeating John McEnroe 6–2, 7–6^{(7–5)} in the final.

=== Players ===
Player 1	Result	Player 2	Result	Player 3	Result	Player 4	Result
(Sweden) Thomas Enqvist	Champion	(United States) John McEnroe	Runner-up	(France) Henri Leconte	3rd Place	(Austria) Thomas Muster	4th Place

=== Draw ===
Semifinals
(Sweden) Thomas Enqvist	7	6
(Austria) Thomas Muster	5	4
(United States) John McEnroe	7	6
(France) Henri Leconte	5	1

Final
(Sweden) Thomas Enqvist	6	7^{7}
(United States) John McEnroe	2	6^{5}
Third place match
(Austria) Thomas Muster	5	6	[9]
(France) Henri Leconte	7	3	[11]
