= 2015 Delray Beach International Tennis Championships =

- Date: 16–22 February
- Edition: 23rd
- Category: World Tour 250
- Draw: 32S / 16D
- Prize money: $549,230
- Surface: Hard / outdoor
- Location: Delray Beach, United States

Champions

Singles
- (Croatia) Ivo Karlović

Doubles
- (United States) Bob Bryan / (United States) Mike Bryan
← 2014 ·	Delray Beach Open	· 2016 →

The 2015 Delray Beach International Tennis Championships was a professional tennis tournament played on hard courts. It was the 23rd edition of the tournament, and part of the 2015 ATP World Tour. It took place in Delray Beach, United States between 16 February and 22 February 2015.

== Singles main-draw entrants ==
=== Seeds ===
Country	Player	Rank^{1}	Seed
RSA	Kevin Anderson	15	1
USA	John Isner	18	2
UKR	Alexandr Dolgopolov	23	3
CRO	Ivo Karlović	25	4
FRA	Adrian Mannarino	40	5
USA	Sam Querrey	41	6
USA	Steve Johnson	42	7
SRB	Viktor Troicki	44	8

- ^{1} Rankings as of February 9, 2015

=== Other entrants ===
The following players received wildcards into the main draw:

- (United States) Stefan Kozlov
- (United States) Denis Kudla
- (Russia) Andrey Rublev

The following players received entry from the qualifying draw:

- (Australia) Thanasi Kokkinakis
- (Japan) Yoshihito Nishioka
- (United States) Eric Quigley
- (Australia) John-Patrick Smith

=== Withdrawals ===
Before the tournament

- (Germany) Benjamin Becker → replaced by Stéphane Robert
- (Croatia) Marin Čilić → replaced by Dustin Brown
- (Argentina) Juan Martín del Potro → replaced by Tim Smyczek
- (United States) Jack Sock → replaced by Filip Krajinović
- (Czech Republic) Radek Štěpánek → replaced by Viktor Troicki

=== Retirements ===
- (Kazakhstan) Mikhail Kukushkin (illness)
- (United States) Sam Querrey (back injury)

== Doubles main-draw entrants ==
=== Seeds ===
Country	Player	Country	Player	Rank^{1}	Seed
USA	Bob Bryan	USA	Mike Bryan	2	1
RSA	Raven Klaasen	IND	Leander Paes	52	2
CRO	Ivan Dodig	BLR	Max Mirnyi	58	3
AUS	Sam Groth	AUS	Chris Guccione	69	4

- ^{1} Rankings are as of February 9, 2015.

=== Withdrawals ===
During the tournament

- (United States) Sam Querrey (back injury)

== Finals ==
=== Singles ===
- (Croatia) Ivo Karlović defeated (United States) Donald Young, 6–3, 6–3

=== Doubles ===
- (United States) Bob Bryan / (United States) Mike Bryan defeated (South Africa) Raven Klaasen / (India) Leander Paes, 6–3, 3–6, [10–6]

=== Team legends ===
- (United Nations) Team International defeated (United States) Team USA, 6–3
