= Outside Royalty =

American indie rock band

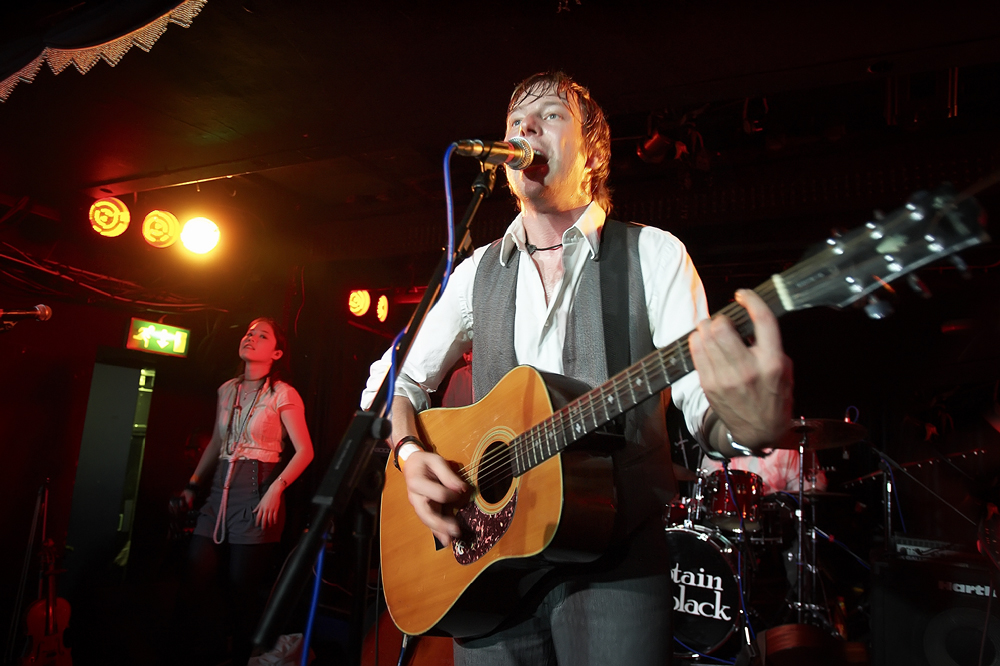
- Outside Royalty at the Soho Revue Bar

Background information
- Origin: Pittsburgh, PA, USA
- Genre: Indie rock
- Years active: 2003–2011
- Labels: Sony / Pop Law, Mothlight
- Members: Adam Billing (vocals/guitar); Frederique Legrand (cello/keyboards); Scott Milner (bass/vocals); Eizan Miyamoto (keyboards); Brandon Paluzzi (drums/samples); Rachel Wu (violin)
- Past members: Paul Crawford-Smith; Kirk Salopek; Kat Agres; Jason Guerra; Doug Korekach

Outside Royalty was a six-piece indie rock band originating from Pittsburgh, Pennsylvania.

== History ==
Originally called Adam Evil & The Outside Royalty, the band was formed in 2003 in Pittsburgh, Pennsylvania. The band spent the next three years building up a following in the Eastern US. In 2006, four members of the band (Adam Billing, Eizan Miyamoto, Rachel Wu, and Brandon Paluzzi) moved to London, England, where they were joined by cellist Frederique Legrand and bassist Paul Crawford-Smith In 2007, the band was among the 14 finalists in the Virgin 'Road to V' competition and made it to the final four. Also in 2007, the band toured the UK with the Young Knives and Pete and the Pirates. Since arriving in London, the band has played with a wide variety of artists, including Babyshambles, The Holloways, The Duke Spirit, Wild Beasts and Good Shoes, and played five sell-out shows at Club NME at Koko in London.

The Guardian announced Outside Royalty as the "New Band Of The Day" on November 16, 2007. In November 2009, it was announced that Outside Royalty would be the opening band for The Cranberries EU tour in March 2010.

Bassist Paul Crawford-Smith left the band in mid-2010 and was replaced by Scott Milner from The Fight. The band last performed in 2011 in Europe. While not officially broken up, there are no future plans for performances.

== Releases ==
- Palladium, digital only (Self released - October 2007)
- Falling, 7" vinyl (Bloody Awful Poetry Records - May 2008)
- Lightbulb (Turning Off), CD single (Mothlight Records - October 26, 2009)
- All Nights Out, CD (Mothlight Records - November 2, 2009; Sony PopLaw - March 2010)
- All We've Got to Do / World Out There, digital single (Mothlight Records - December 17, 2014)
