= 2015 Delray Beach International Tennis Championships – Doubles =

Doubles
- 2015 Delray Beach International Tennis Championships

Final
- Champions: (United States) Bob Bryan (United States) Mike Bryan
- Runners-up: (South Africa) Raven Klaasen (India) Leander Paes
- Score: 6–3, 3–6, [10–6]

Events
Singles	Doubles
- Delray Beach Open

Bob and Mike Bryan successfully defended their title, defeating Raven Klaasen and Leander Paes in the final, 6–3, 3–6, [10–6].

== Seeds ==
1. (United States) Bob Bryan / (United States) Mike Bryan (champions)
2. (South Africa) Raven Klaasen / (India) Leander Paes (final)
3. (Croatia) Ivan Dodig / (Belarus) Max Mirnyi (quarterfinals)
4. (Australia) Sam Groth / (Australia) Chris Guccione (first round)

== Draw ==
Key

- Q = Qualifier
- WC = Wild card
- LL = Lucky loser
- Alt = Alternate
- ITF = ITF entry
- PR = Protected ranking
- SR = Special ranking
- SE = Special exempt
- JE = Junior exempt
- JR = Junior Accelerator Programme entrant
- CO = College Accelerator Programme entrant
- NG = Next Gen Accelerator Program entrant
- w/o = Walkover
- r = Retired
- d = Defaulted

=== Draw ===
First round
1	(United States) B Bryan (United States) M Bryan	6	7
(Germany) D Brown (France) A Mannarino	3	5
(United States) J Cerretani (Russia) T Gabashvili	2	6^{8}
(Australia) J-P Smith (New Zealand) M Venus	6	7^{10}
3	(Croatia) I Dodig (Belarus) M Mirnyi	3	7	[10]
(Poland) M Fyrstenberg (Mexico) S González	6	5	[5]
(United States) E Butorac (United States) R Ram	7	4	[10]
(Kazakhstan) M Kukushkin (Chinese Taipei) Y-h Lu	5	6	[4]
(United States) S Bangoura (United States) V Mirzadeh	4	6	[9]
(Slovenia) A Bedene (Colombia) A González	6	3	[11]
(Australia) B Tomic (Serbia) V Troicki	6^{10}	6	[10]
4	(Australia) S Groth (Australia) C Guccione	7^{12}	2	[7]
(United States) S Johnson (United States) S Querrey
(Philippines) T Huey (United States) S Lipsky	^{w/o}
(Tunisia) M Jaziri (Australia) M Matosevic	3	6^{0}
2	(South Africa) R Klaasen (India) L Paes	6	7^{7}

Quarterfinals
1	(United States) B Bryan (United States) M Bryan	6	6
(Australia) J-P Smith (New Zealand) M Venus	1	3
3	(Croatia) I Dodig (Belarus) M Mirnyi	4	7	[4]
(United States) E Butorac (United States) R Ram	6	5	[10]
(Slovenia) A Bedene (Colombia) A González	4	2
(Australia) B Tomic (Serbia) V Troicki	6	6
(Philippines) T Huey (United States) S Lipsky	3	4
2	(South Africa) R Klaasen (India) L Paes	6	6

Semifinals
1	(United States) B Bryan (United States) M Bryan	4	6	[10]
(United States) E Butorac (United States) R Ram	6	3	[4]
(Australia) B Tomic (Serbia) V Troicki	4	4
2	(South Africa) R Klaasen (India) L Paes	6	6

Final
1	(United States) B Bryan (United States) M Bryan	6	3	[10]
2	(South Africa) R Klaasen (India) L Paes	3	6	[6]
