= 2015 Delray Beach International Tennis Championships – Singles =

Singles
- 2015 Delray Beach International Tennis Championships

Final
- Champion: (Croatia) Ivo Karlović
- Runner-up: (United States) Donald Young
- Score: 6–3, 6–3

Details
- Draw: 32
- Seeds: 8

Events
| Singles | Doubles |
- Delray Beach Open

Marin Čilić was the defending champion, but withdrew due to injury.

Ivo Karlović won the title, defeating Donald Young in the final, 6–3, 6–3.

== Seeds ==
1. (South Africa) Kevin Anderson (second round)
2. (United States) John Isner (first round)
3. (Ukraine) Alexandr Dolgopolov (quarterfinals)
4. (Croatia) Ivo Karlović (champion)
5. (France) Adrian Mannarino (semifinals)
6. (United States) Sam Querrey (first round, retired)
7. (United States) Steve Johnson (quarterfinals)
8. (Serbia) Viktor Troicki (second round)

== Draw ==
Key

- Q = Qualifier
- WC = Wild card
- LL = Lucky loser
- Alt = Alternate
- ITF = ITF entry
- PR = Protected ranking
- SR = Special ranking
- SE = Special exempt
- JE = Junior exempt
- JR = Junior Accelerator Programme entrant
- CO = College Accelerator Programme entrant
- NG = Next Gen Accelerator Program entrant
- w/o = Walkover
- r = Retired
- d = Defaulted

=== Finals ===
Semifinals
5 | (France) Adrian Mannarino | 3 | 4
4 | (Croatia) Ivo Karlović | 6 | 6
(United States) Donald Young | 4 | 6 | 6
(Australia) Bernard Tomic | 6 | 4 | 2

Final
4 | (Croatia) Ivo Karlović | 6 | 6
(United States) Donald Young | 3 | 3

=== Top half ===
First round
1 | (South Africa) K Anderson | 6 | 6
Q | (Australia) J-P Smith | 3 | 3
(Australia) S Groth | 7^{8} | 6^{5} | 4
(Chinese Taipei) Y-h Lu | 6^{6} | 7^{7} | 6
(Slovakia) L Lacko | 3 | 4
WC | (United States) D Kudla | 6 | 6
Q | (United States) E Quigley | 4 | 4
5 | (France) A Mannarino | 6 | 6
4 | (Croatia) I Karlović | 6 | 6^{3} | 6
(Germany) D Brown | 3 | 7^{7} | 2
(Serbia) F Krajinović | 2 | 3
Q | (Australia) T Kokkinakis | 6 | 6
WC | (Russia) A Rublev | 6 | 1 | 6
(Israel) D Sela | 4 | 6 | 3
(Kazakhstan) M Kukushkin | 3 | 1^{r}
7 | (United States) S Johnson | 6 | 4

Second round
1 | (South Africa) K Anderson | 6^{6} | 3
(Chinese Taipei) Y-h Lu | 7^{8} | 6
WC | (United States) D Kudla | 2 | 2
5 | (France) A Mannarino | 6 | 6
4 | (Croatia) I Karlović | 7^{7} | 7^{7}
Q | (Australia) T Kokkinakis | 6^{4} | 6^{2}
WC | (Russia) A Rublev | 3 | 3
7 | (United States) S Johnson | 6 | 6

Quarterfinals
(Chinese Taipei) Y-h Lu | 6 | 1 | 1
5 | (France) A Mannarino | 3 | 6 | 6
4 | (Croatia) I Karlović | 6 | 7^{7}
7 | (United States) S Johnson | 2 | 6^{4}

Semifinals
5 | (France) A Mannarino | 3 | 4
4 | (Croatia) I Karlović | 6 | 6

=== Bottom half ===
First round
6 | (United States) S Querrey | 6 | 1^{r}
(Colombia) A González | 3 | 2
(Croatia) I Dodig | 5 | 5
(United States) D Young | 7 | 7
(United States) T Smyczek | 7 | 6
WC | (United States) S Kozlov | 5 | 2
(Russia) T Gabashvili | 6^{4} | 3
3 | (Ukraine) A Dolgopolov | 7^{7} | 6
8 | (Serbia) V Troicki | 6^{3} | 7 | 6
PR | (France) S Robert | 7^{7} | 5 | 1
(Australia) B Tomic | 6 | 6
(Tunisia) M Jaziri | 3 | 3
Q | (Japan) Y Nishioka | 7 | 6
(Netherlands) I Sijsling | 5 | 1
(Australia) M Matosevic | 6 | 6
2 | (United States) J Isner | 4 | 4

Second round
(Colombia) A González | 3 | 2
(United States) D Young | 6 | 6
(United States) T Smyczek | 2 | 4
3 | (Ukraine) A Dolgopolov | 6 | 6
8 | (Serbia) V Troicki | 3 | 7^{7} | 4
(Australia) B Tomic | 6 | 6^{2} | 6
Q | (Japan) Y Nishioka | 6 | 6
(Australia) M Matosevic | 1 | 3

Quarterfinals
(United States) D Young | 2 | 6 | 6
3 | (Ukraine) A Dolgopolov | 6 | 3 | 4
(Australia) B Tomic | 6 | 6
Q | (Japan) Y Nishioka | 3 | 1

Semifinals
(United States) D Young | 4 | 6 | 6
(Australia) B Tomic | 6 | 4 | 2

== Qualifying ==
=== Seeds ===
1. (Slovenia) Aljaž Bedene (second round)
2. (Romania) Victor Hănescu (qualifying competition)
3. (Australia) Thanasi Kokkinakis (qualified)
4. (Japan) Yoshihito Nishioka (qualified)
5. (United States) Ryan Harrison (withdrew)
6. (United States) Chase Buchanan (second round)
7. (United States) Alex Kuznetsov (qualifying competition)
8. (United States) Jared Donaldson (first round)

=== Qualifiers ===
1. (Australia) John-Patrick Smith
2. (United States) Eric Quigley
3. (Australia) Thanasi Kokkinakis
4. (Japan) Yoshihito Nishioka

=== Qualifying draw ===
==== First qualifier ====
First round
1 | (Slovenia) Aljaž Bedene | 6 | 6
(Uzbekistan) Temur Ismailov | 3 | 2
(France) Gianni Mina | 2 | 2
(United States) Robby Ginepri | 6 | 6
(New Zealand) Michael Venus | 6 | 7
(Zimbabwe) Takanyi Garanganga | 1 | 5
(Australia) John-Patrick Smith | 6 | 6
8 | (United States) Jared Donaldson | 4 | 4

Second round
1 | (Slovenia) Aljaž Bedene | 3 | 4
(United States) Robby Ginepri | 6 | 6
(New Zealand) Michael Venus | 6 | 2 | 4
(Australia) John-Patrick Smith | 2 | 6 | 6

Qualifying competition
(United States) Robby Ginepri | 6 | 3 | 0
(Australia) John-Patrick Smith | 3 | 6 | 6

==== Second qualifier ====
First round
2 | (Romania) Victor Hănescu | 6 | 4 | 6
(Republic of Ireland) James McGee | 3 | 6 | 4
WC | (Canada) Pavel Krainik | 6 | 6
(Brazil) Thales Turini | 3 | 4
(Argentina) Facundo Mena | 7^{7} | 3 | 3
(United States) Eric Quigley | 6^{2} | 6 | 6
WC | (South Africa) Lance Cohen | 2 | 3
6 | (United States) Chase Buchanan | 6 | 6

Second round
2 | (Romania) Victor Hănescu | 6 | 6
WC | (Canada) Pavel Krainik | 2 | 3
(United States) Eric Quigley | 4 | 7^{9} | 7^{7}
6 | (United States) Chase Buchanan | 6 | 6^{7} | 6^{3}

Qualifying competition
2 | (Romania) Victor Hănescu | 3 | 7 | 4
(United States) Eric Quigley | 6 | 5 | 6

==== Third qualifier ====
First round
3 | (Australia) Thanasi Kokkinakis | 6 | 6
WC | (United States) Ty Trombetta | 1 | 4
(Argentina) Guido Andreozzi | 1 | 6 | 6
(Argentina) Marco Trungelliti | 6 | 2 | 3
(United Kingdom) Liam Broady | 3 | 5
(China) Wang Chuhan | 6 | 7
(Spain) Jaume Pla Malfeito | 4 | 1
7 | (United States) Alex Kuznetsov | 6 | 6

Second round
3 | (Australia) Thanasi Kokkinakis | 6 | 6
(Argentina) Guido Andreozzi | 3 | 2
(China) Wang Chuhan | 4 | 6^{5}
7 | (United States) Alex Kuznetsov | 6 | 7^{7}

Qualifying competition
3 | (Australia) Thanasi Kokkinakis | 6 | 6
7 | (United States) Alex Kuznetsov | 1 | 3

==== Fourth qualifier ====
First round
4 | (Japan) Yoshihito Nishioka | 6 | 4 | 6
WC | (United States) Patrick Daciek | 3 | 6 | 4
(United States) Marcos Giron | 6 | 7
(United States) Greg Ouellette | 4 | 5
(United States) Sekou Bangoura | 3 | 6 | 7^{9}
(Ukraine) Artem Smirnov | 6 | 4 | 6^{7}
(United States) Noah Rubin | 6 | 6
Alt | (Mexico) Alan Núñez Aguilera | 4 | 3

Second round
4 | (Japan) Yoshihito Nishioka | 4 | 6 | 6
(United States) Marcos Giron | 6 | 3 | 2
(United States) Sekou Bangoura | 6 | 2 | 6
(United States) Noah Rubin | 4 | 6 | 4

Qualifying competition
4 | (Japan) Yoshihito Nishioka | 7^{7} | 6
(United States) Sekou Bangoura | 6^{5} | 4
