= 1993 Davis Cup World Group =

- Date: 26 March – 5 December
- Edition: 13th

Champions
- Germany
- Davis Cup

The World Group was the highest level of Davis Cup competition in 1993. The first-round losers went into the Davis Cup World Group qualifying round, and the winners progressed to the quarterfinals and were guaranteed a World Group spot for 1994.

The United States were the defending champions, but were eliminated in the first round.

Germany won the title, defeating Australia in the final, 4–1. The final was held at the Messe Düsseldorf Exhibition Hall in Düsseldorf, Germany, from 3 to 5 December. It was the German team's 3rd Davis Cup title overall.

== Participating teams ==
Participating teams
Australia	Austria	Brazil	Cuba
Czech Republic (Note: Following the dissolution of Czechoslovakia, the Czech Republic replaced Czechoslovakia in the World Group.)	Denmark	France	Germany
India	Italy	Netherlands	Russia (Note: Russia took over the place in the World Group gained by the CIS in the 1992 Davis Cup.)
Spain	Sweden	Switzerland	United States

== Draw ==
First round 26–28 March
Melbourne, Australia (grass)
United States	1
Australia	4
Modena, Italy (indoor carpet)
Italy	4
Brazil	1
Vienna, Austria (indoor clay)
France	4
Austria	1
Calcutta, India (grass)
Switzerland	2
India	3
Barcelona, Spain (clay)
Netherlands	3
Spain	2
Kalmar, Sweden (indoor carpet)
Cuba	0
Sweden	5
Aarhus, Denmark (indoor carpet)
Denmark	1
Czech Republic	4
Moscow, Russia (indoor carpet)
Russia	1
Germany	4

Quarterfinals; 16–18 July
Florence, Italy (clay)
Australia	3
Italy	2
Fréjus, France (clay)
France	2
India	3
The Hague, Netherlands (clay)
Netherlands	1
Sweden	4
Halle, Germany (grass)
Czech Republic	1
Germany	4

Semifinals; 24–26 September
Chandigarh, India (grass)
Australia	5
India	0
Borlänge, Sweden (indoor clay)
Sweden	0
Germany	5

Final; 3–5 December
Düsseldorf, Germany (indoor clay)
Australia	1
Germany	4

== First round ==
=== Australia vs. United States ===
Australia
4
Kooyong Stadium, Melbourne, Australia
26–28 March 1993
Grass

United States
1

			1	2	3	4	5
1	(Australia) (United States)	Wally Masur; Brad Gilbert	6; 3	6^{6} 7^{8}	6; 4	6; 2
2	(Australia) (United States)	Mark Woodforde; David Wheaton	3; 6	7^{7} 6^{1}	6; 4	6; 4
3	(Australia) (United States)	Todd Woodbridge / Mark Woodforde; Jim Grabb / Richey Reneberg	7^{7} 6^{5}	6; 2	3; 6	6^{3} 7^{7}	6; 4
4	(Australia) (United States)	Mark Woodforde; Brad Gilbert	5; 7	6; 1	6; 4
5	(Australia) (United States)	Wally Masur; David Wheaton	4; 6	5; 7

=== Italy vs. Brazil ===
Italy
4
Palasport Modena, Modena, Italy
26–28 March 1993
Carpet (indoors)

Brazil
1

			1	2	3	4	5
1	(Italy) (Brazil)	Diego Nargiso; Jaime Oncins	7; 5	6; 2	6; 3
2	(Italy) (Brazil)	Omar Camporese; Luiz Mattar	7^{7} 6^{4}	4; 6	6; 2	6; 1
3	(Italy) (Brazil)	Omar Camporese / Diego Nargiso; Cássio Motta / Fernando Roese	7^{9} 6^{7}	3; 6	4; 6	6; 3	10; 8
4	(Italy) (Brazil)	Omar Camporese; Jaime Oncins	4; 6	6; 3	3; 6
5	(Italy) (Brazil)	Diego Nargiso; Cássio Motta	6; 1	6; 2

=== Austria vs. France ===
Austria
1
Ferry-Dusika-Hallenstadion, Vienna, Austria
26–28 March 1993
Clay (indoors)

France
4

			1	2	3	4	5
1	(Austria) (France)	Horst Skoff; Arnaud Boetsch	2; 6	6^{5} 7^{7}	1; 6
2	(Austria) (France)	Alex Antonitsch; Guy Forget	4; 6	2; 6	3; 6
3	(Austria) (France)	Alex Antonitsch / Horst Skoff; Guy Forget / Henri Leconte	5; 7	4; 6	5; 7
4	(Austria) (France)	Horst Skoff; Guy Forget	6; 3	3; 6	6; 1
5	(Austria) (France)	Gilbert Schaller; Arnaud Boetsch	4; 6	2; 6

=== India vs. Switzerland ===
India
3
Calcutta South Club, Calcutta, India
26–28 March 1993
Grass

Switzerland
2

			1	2	3	4	5
1	(India) (Switzerland)	Leander Paes; Jakob Hlasek	7; 5	6; 1	6; 2
2	(India) (Switzerland)	Ramesh Krishnan; Marc Rosset	6^{3} 7^{7}	6; 4	3; 6	6^{4} 7^{7}
3	(India) (Switzerland)	Ramesh Krishnan / Leander Paes; Jakob Hlasek / Marc Rosset	6^{4} 7^{7}	7^{12} 6^{10}	7; 5	2; 6	6; 3
4	(India) (Switzerland)	Leander Paes; Marc Rosset	4; 6	4; 6	4; 6
5	(India) (Switzerland)	Ramesh Krishnan; Jakob Hlasek	6; 3	6; 4	6; 2

=== Spain vs. Netherlands ===
Spain
2
Tennis de la Vall d'Hebron, Barcelona, Spain
26–28 March 1993
Clay

Netherlands
3

			1	2	3	4	5
1	(Spain) (Netherlands)	Sergi Bruguera; Paul Haarhuis	3; 6	6; 4	6; 4	3; 6	2; 6
2	(Spain) (Netherlands)	Carlos Costa; Mark Koevermans	5; 7	6; 3	6; 1	6; 1
3	(Spain) (Netherlands)	Sergio Casal / Emilio Sánchez; Jacco Eltingh / Paul Haarhuis	6; 3	6; 4	5; 7	7; 5
4	(Spain) (Netherlands)	Carlos Costa; Paul Haarhuis	6; 3	6; 4	3; 6	6^{6} 7^{8}	3; 6
5	(Spain) (Netherlands)	Sergi Bruguera; Mark Koevermans	6; 3	7^{7} 6^{4}	4; 6	4; 6	4; 6

=== Sweden vs. Cuba ===
Sweden
5
Sporthallen, Kalmar, Sweden
26–28 March 1993
Carpet (indoors)

Cuba
0

			1	2	3	4	5
1	(Sweden) (Cuba)	Stefan Edberg; Juan Pino	6; 2	6; 2	6; 2
2	(Sweden) (Cuba)	Nicklas Kulti; Mario Tabares	6; 3	6; 0	4; 6	6; 3
3	(Sweden) (Cuba)	Henrik Holm / Anders Järryd; Juan Pino / Mario Tabares	6; 3	6; 2	6; 4
4	(Sweden) (Cuba)	Stefan Edberg; Mario Tabares	6; 3	6; 2
5	(Sweden) (Cuba)	Nicklas Kulti; Juan Pino	6; 4	6; 4

=== Denmark vs. Czech Republic ===
Denmark
1
Aarhus Idrætspark, Aarhus, Denmark
26–28 March 1993
Carpet (indoors)

Czech Republic
4

			1	2	3	4	5
1	(Denmark) (Czech Republic)	Kenneth Carlsen; Karel Nováček	6^{7} 7^{9}	4; 6	1; 6
2	(Denmark) (Czech Republic)	Frederik Fetterlein; Petr Korda	4; 6	3; 6	2; 6
3	(Denmark) (Czech Republic)	Kenneth Carlsen / Morten Christensen; Petr Korda / Cyril Suk	6; 4	6^{2} 7^{7}	2; 6	2; 6
4	(Denmark) (Czech Republic)	Kenneth Carlsen; Martin Damm	7^{7} 6^{5}	6; 4
5	(Denmark) (Czech Republic)	Frederik Fetterlein; Karel Nováček	4; 6	4; 6

=== Russia vs. Germany ===
Russia
1
Olympic Stadium, Moscow, Russia
26–28 March 1993
Carpet (indoors)

Germany
4

			1	2	3	4	5
1	(Russia) (Germany)	Andrei Cherkasov; Carl-Uwe Steeb	6; 4	6; 1	4; 6	6^{6} 7^{8}	4; 6
2	(Russia) (Germany)	Andrei Olhovskiy; Michael Stich	5; 7	1; 6	6; 1	5; 7
3	(Russia) (Germany)	Andrei Cherkasov / Andrei Olhovskiy; Patrik Kühnen / Michael Stich	4; 6	2; 6	2; 6
4	(Russia) (Germany)	Andrei Olhovskiy; Carl-Uwe Steeb	4; 6	7^{7} 6^{2}	7^{8} 6^{6}
5	(Russia) (Germany)	Yevgeny Kafelnikov; Michael Stich	3; 6	4; 6

== Quarterfinals ==
=== Italy vs. Australia ===
Italy
2
Florence Tennis Club, Florence, Italy
16–18 July 1993
Clay

Australia
3

			1	2	3	4	5
1	(Italy) (Australia)	Renzo Furlan; Richard Fromberg	6^{5} 7^{7}	6^{3} 7^{7}	4; 6
2	(Italy) (Australia)	Stefano Pescosolido; Mark Woodforde	6; 3	7; 5	5; 7	6; 4
3	(Italy) (Australia)	Paolo Canè / Diego Nargiso; Todd Woodbridge / Mark Woodforde	7^{8} 6^{6}	6^{5} 7^{7}	2; 6	3; 6
4	(Italy) (Australia)	Paolo Canè; Mark Woodforde	6; 2	1; 6	7; 5	6; 4
5	(Italy) (Australia)	Stefano Pescosolido; Richard Fromberg	6^{3} 7^{7}	1; 6	4; 6

=== France vs. India ===
France
2
Arènes de Fréjus, Fréjus, France
16–19 July 1993
Clay

India
3

			1	2	3	4	5
1	(France) (India)	Arnaud Boetsch; Ramesh Krishnan	6; 3	6; 3	6; 1
2	(France) (India)	Henri Leconte; Leander Paes	1; 6	2; 6	6; 3	3; 6
3	(France) (India)	Arnaud Boetsch / Henri Leconte; Ramesh Krishnan / Leander Paes	7^{7} 6^{5}	6; 3	6; 4
4	(France) (India)	Arnaud Boetsch; Leander Paes	4; 6	5; 7	4; 6
5	(France) (India)	Rodolphe Gilbert; Ramesh Krishnan	6; 2	4; 6	6; 4	5; 7	4; 6

=== Netherlands vs. Sweden ===
Netherlands
1
Malieveld, The Hague, Netherlands
16–18 July 1993
Clay

Sweden
4

			1	2	3	4	5
1	(Netherlands) (Sweden)	Paul Haarhuis; Magnus Gustafsson	7; 5	1; 6	2; 6	3; 6
2	(Netherlands) (Sweden)	Richard Krajicek; Magnus Larsson	3; 6	4; 6	4; 6
3	(Netherlands) (Sweden)	Paul Haarhuis / Mark Koevermans; Henrik Holm / Anders Järryd	3; 6	1; 6	3; 6
4	(Netherlands) (Sweden)	Richard Krajicek; Magnus Gustafsson	4; 6	5; 7
5	(Netherlands) (Sweden)	Paul Haarhuis; Magnus Larsson	7; 5	6; 2

=== Germany vs. Czech Republic ===
Germany
4
Gerry Weber Stadion, Halle, Germany
16–18 July 1993
Grass

Czech Republic
1

			1	2	3	4	5
1	(Germany) (Czech Republic)	Marc-Kevin Goellner; Petr Korda	6; 4	6^{5} 7^{7}	6; 1	7^{7} 6^{3}
2	(Germany) (Czech Republic)	Michael Stich; Karel Nováček	6; 3	7; 5	3; 6	6^{4} 7^{7}	7; 5
3	(Germany) (Czech Republic)	Patrik Kühnen / Michael Stich; Petr Korda / Cyril Suk	6^{6} 7^{8}	6; 4	7^{7} 6^{3}	6; 4
4	(Germany) (Czech Republic)	Michael Stich; Petr Korda	2; 6	6^{5} 7^{7}
5	(Germany) (Czech Republic)	Marc-Kevin Goellner; Karel Nováček	4; 4					retired

== Semifinals ==
=== India vs. Australia ===
India
0
Chandigarh Stadium, Chandigarh, India
24–26 September 1993
Grass

Australia
5

			1	2	3	4	5
1	(India) (Australia)	Leander Paes; Jason Stoltenberg	3; 6	6^{5} 7^{7}	2; 6
2	(India) (Australia)	Ramesh Krishnan; Wally Masur	2; 6	0; 6	4; 6
3	(India) (Australia)	Ramesh Krishnan / Leander Paes; Todd Woodbridge / Mark Woodforde	2; 6	6^{3} 7^{7}	1; 6
4	(India) (Australia)	Leander Paes; Wally Masur	4; 6	2; 6
5	(India) (Australia)	Zeeshan Ali; Jason Stoltenberg	3; 6	3; 6

=== Sweden vs. Germany ===
Sweden
0
Arena Kupolen, Borlänge, Sweden
24–26 September 1993
Clay (indoors)

Germany
5

			1	2	3	4	5
1	(Sweden) (Germany)	Magnus Gustafsson; Michael Stich	2; 6	3; 6	6; 3	2; 6
2	(Sweden) (Germany)	Stefan Edberg; Marc-Kevin Goellner	3; 6	6; 4	4; 6	6^{4} 7^{7}
3	(Sweden) (Germany)	Henrik Holm / Anders Järryd; Patrik Kühnen / Michael Stich	4; 6	4; 6	6^{7} 7^{9}
4	(Sweden) (Germany)	Stefan Edberg; Michael Stich	1; 6	1; 6
5	(Sweden) (Germany)	Henrik Holm; Marc-Kevin Goellner	6^{3} 7^{7}	4; 6

== Final ==
=== Germany vs. Australia ===
Germany
4
Messe Düsseldorf Exhibition Hall, Düsseldorf, Germany
3–5 December 1993
Clay (indoors)

Australia
1

			1	2	3	4	5
1	(Germany) (Australia)	Michael Stich; Jason Stoltenberg	6^{2} 7^{7}	6; 3	6; 1	4; 6	6; 3
2	(Germany) (Australia)	Marc-Kevin Goellner; Richard Fromberg	6; 3	7; 5	6^{8} 7^{10}	2; 6	7; 9
3	(Germany) (Australia)	Patrik Kühnen / Michael Stich; Todd Woodbridge / Mark Woodforde	7^{7} 6^{4}	4; 6	6; 3	7^{7} 6^{4}
4	(Germany) (Australia)	Michael Stich; Richard Fromberg	6; 4	6; 2	6; 2
5	(Germany) (Australia)	Marc-Kevin Goellner; Jason Stoltenberg	6; 1	6^{2} 7^{7}	7^{7} 6^{3}
