= 1994 Davis Cup World Group =

Highest level of tennis team competition

- Date: 25 March – 4 December
- Edition: 14th

Champions
- Sweden
- Davis Cup

The World Group was the highest level of Davis Cup competition in 1994. The first-round losers went into the Davis Cup World Group qualifying round, and the winners progressed to the quarterfinals and were guaranteed a World Group spot for 1995.

Germany were the defending champions, but were eliminated in the semifinals.

Sweden won the title, defeating Russia in the final, 4–1. The final was held at the Olympic Stadium in Moscow, Russia, from 2 to 4 December. It was the Swedish team's 5th Davis Cup title overall.

== Participating teams ==
Participating teams
Australia	Austria	Belgium	Czech Republic
Denmark	France	Germany	Hungary
India	Israel	Italy	Netherlands
Russia	Spain	Sweden	United States

== Draw ==
First round 25–27 March
New Delhi, India (grass)
United States	5
India	0
Eindhoven, Netherlands (indoor carpet)
Netherlands	5
Belgium	0
Lund, Sweden (indoor carpet)
Sweden	5
Denmark	0
Besançon, France (indoor hard)
France	4
Hungary	1
Ramat HaSharon, Israel (hard)
Israel	1
Czech Republic	4
Saint Petersburg, Russia (indoor carpet)
Russia	4
Australia	1
Madrid, Spain (clay)
Italy	1
Spain	4
Graz, Austria (indoor clay)
Austria	2
Germany	3

Quarterfinals; 15–17 July
Rotterdam, Netherlands (hard)
United States	3
Netherlands	2
Cannes, France (hard)
Sweden	3
France	2
Saint Petersburg, Russia (indoor carpet)
Czech Republic	2
Russia	3
Halle, Germany (grass)
Spain	2
Germany	3

Semifinals; 23–25 September
Gothenburg, Sweden (indoor carpet)
United States	2
Sweden	3
Hamburg, Germany (hard)
Russia	4
Germany	1

Final; 2–4 December
Moscow, Russia (indoor carpet)
Sweden	4
Russia	1

== First round ==
=== India vs. United States ===
India
0
Delhi Lawn Tennis Association Complex, New Delhi, India
25–27 March 1994
Grass

United States
5

			1	2	3	4	5
1	(India) (United States)	Zeeshan Ali; Jim Courier	1; 6	1; 6	2; 6
2	(India) (United States)	Leander Paes; Todd Martin	3; 6	6; 4	1; 6	6^{1} 7^{7}
3	(India) (United States)	Gaurav Natekar / Leander Paes; Patrick McEnroe / Richey Reneberg	6^{0} 7^{7}	4; 6	6; 2	6^{4} 7^{7}
4	(India) (United States)	Leander Paes; Jim Courier	7^{7} 6^{5}	1; 6	4; 6
5	(India) (United States)	Zeeshan Ali; Todd Martin	2; 6	5; 7

=== Netherlands vs. Belgium ===
Netherlands
5
Eindhoven SC, Eindhoven, Netherlands
25–27 March 1994
Carpet (indoors)

Belgium
0

			1	2	3	4	5
1	(Netherlands) (Belgium)	Paul Haarhuis; Filip Dewulf	6; 3	6^{5} 7^{7}	3; 6	6; 4	6; 4
2	(Netherlands) (Belgium)	Jan Siemerink; Xavier Daufresne	6; 4	6^{3} 7^{7}	6; 4	6; 4
3	(Netherlands) (Belgium)	Jacco Eltingh / Paul Haarhuis; Xavier Daufresne / Filip Dewulf	6; 3	6; 4	6; 2
4	(Netherlands) (Belgium)	Paul Haarhuis; Xavier Daufresne	6; 2	6; 2
5	(Netherlands) (Belgium)	Jan Siemerink; Bart Wuyts	6; 1	6; 1

=== Sweden vs. Denmark ===
Sweden
5
Victoriastadion, Lund, Sweden
25–27 March 1994
Carpet (indoors)

Denmark
0

			1	2	3	4	5
1	(Sweden) (Denmark)	Stefan Edberg; Frederik Fetterlein	6; 2	6; 4	6; 2
2	(Sweden) (Denmark)	Magnus Gustafsson; Kenneth Carlsen	6; 3	7^{7} 6^{2}	4; 6	4; 6	11; 9
3	(Sweden) (Denmark)	Jan Apell / Jonas Björkman; Kenneth Carlsen / Morten Christensen	6^{9} 7^{11}	7^{7} 6^{4}	7^{7} 6^{4}	2; 6	6; 2
4	(Sweden) (Denmark)	Stefan Edberg; Kenneth Carlsen	6^{4} 7^{7}	6; 1	6; 2
5	(Sweden) (Denmark)	Magnus Gustafsson; Frederik Fetterlein	7^{7} 6^{5}	6; 2

=== France vs. Hungary ===
France
4
Palais des Sports, Besançon, France
25–27 March 1994
Hard (indoors)

Hungary
1

			1	2	3	4	5
1	(France) (Hungary)	Arnaud Boetsch; Sándor Noszály	6; 3	6; 2	6; 2
2	(France) (Hungary)	Henri Leconte; József Krocskó	4; 6	6^{4} 7^{7}	3; 6
3	(France) (Hungary)	Arnaud Boetsch / Olivier Delaître; László Markovits / Viktor Nagy	6; 3	6; 3	6; 3
4	(France) (Hungary)	Arnaud Boetsch; József Krocskó	6; 3	6; 3	6; 1
5	(France) (Hungary)	Henri Leconte; Sándor Noszály	6; 4	6; 3

=== Israel vs. Czech Republic ===
Israel
1
Canada Stadium, Ramat HaSharon, Israel
25–27 March 1994
Hard

Czech Republic
4

			1	2	3	4	5
1	(Israel) (Czech Republic)	Gilad Bloom; Petr Korda	1; 6	3; 6	4; 6
2	(Israel) (Czech Republic)	Amos Mansdorf; Karel Nováček	7^{7} 6^{4}	6; 2	7; 5
3	(Israel) (Czech Republic)	Eyal Erlich / Amos Mansdorf; Petr Korda / Cyril Suk	6; 3	6^{3} 7^{7}	6^{3} 7^{7}	1; 6
4	(Israel) (Czech Republic)	Amos Mansdorf; Petr Korda	4; 6	6; 3	7^{7} 6^{4}	1; 6	1; 6
5	(Israel) (Czech Republic)	Gilad Bloom; Karel Nováček	4; 6	3; 6

=== Russia vs. Australia ===
Russia
4
Sports Forum, Saint Petersburg, Russia
25–27 March 1994
Carpet (indoors)

Australia
1

			1	2	3	4	5
1	(Russia) (Australia)	Yevgeny Kafelnikov; Pat Rafter	6; 3	6; 0	6; 4
2	(Russia) (Australia)	Alexander Volkov; Jamie Morgan	6; 4	6^{3} 7^{7}	6^{2} 7^{7}	1; 6
3	(Russia) (Australia)	Yevgeny Kafelnikov / Andrei Olhovskiy; Todd Woodbridge / Mark Woodforde	6; 4	6; 0	3; 6	4; 6	6; 3
4	(Russia) (Australia)	Alexander Volkov; Pat Rafter	6; 4	7^{7} 6^{4}	6; 3
5	(Russia) (Australia)	Yevgeny Kafelnikov; Jamie Morgan	6; 3	6^{6} 7^{8}	7; 5

=== Spain vs. Italy ===
Spain
4
Club de Campo Villa de Madrid, Madrid, Spain
25–27 March 1994
Clay

Italy
1

			1	2	3	4	5
1	(Spain) (Italy)	Sergi Bruguera; Andrea Gaudenzi	6; 3	7; 5	6; 1
2	(Spain) (Italy)	Carlos Costa; Stefano Pescosolido	6; 4	6; 4	1; 6	4; 6	2; 6
3	(Spain) (Italy)	Sergi Bruguera / Tomás Carbonell; Paolo Canè / Diego Nargiso	6; 3	3; 6	6; 1	6; 1
4	(Spain) (Italy)	Sergi Bruguera; Stefano Pescosolido	6; 4	1; 6	0; 6	6; 2	6; 3
5	(Spain) (Italy)	Alberto Berasategui; Andrea Gaudenzi	7; 5	6; 3

=== Austria vs. Germany ===
Austria
2
Schwarzl Freizeit Zentrum, Graz, Austria
25–27 March 1994
Clay (indoors)

Germany
3

			1	2	3	4	5
1	(Austria) (Germany)	Horst Skoff; Michael Stich	6; 4	3; 6	2; 6	2; 6
2	(Austria) (Germany)	Thomas Muster; Marc-Kevin Goellner	6; 3	6; 3	6; 3
3	(Austria) (Germany)	Alex Antonitsch / Thomas Muster; Patrik Kühnen / Michael Stich	4; 6	6; 3	2; 6	6; 2	1; 6
4	(Austria) (Germany)	Thomas Muster; Michael Stich	6; 4	6^{8} 7^{10}	4; 6	6; 3	12; 10
5	(Austria) (Germany)	Horst Skoff; Marc-Kevin Goellner	6; 3	4; 6	5; 7	1; 6

== Quarterfinals ==
=== Netherlands vs. United States ===
Netherlands
2
Mullerpier, Rotterdam, Netherlands
15–17 July 1994
Hard

United States
3

			1	2	3	4	5
1	(Netherlands) (United States)	Richard Krajicek; Jim Courier	4; 6	3; 6	3; 6
2	(Netherlands) (United States)	Jacco Eltingh; Pete Sampras	2; 6	2; 6	0; 6
3	(Netherlands) (United States)	Jacco Eltingh / Paul Haarhuis; Jared Palmer / Richey Reneberg	2; 6	7^{8} 6^{6}	6; 3	6^{2} 7^{7}	6; 2
4	(Netherlands) (United States)	Richard Krajicek; Pete Sampras	2; 6	7; 5	7^{7} 6^{5}	7; 5
5	(Netherlands) (United States)	Jacco Eltingh; Jim Courier	3; 6	4; 6	6; 4	1; 6

=== France vs. Sweden ===
France
2
Stade des Hespérides, Cannes, France
15–17 July 1994
Hard

Sweden
3

			1	2	3	4	5
1	(France) (Sweden)	Arnaud Boetsch; Stefan Edberg	3; 6	2; 6	6^{4} 7^{7}
2	(France) (Sweden)	Cédric Pioline; Henrik Holm	6; 4	6; 3	7; 5
3	(France) (Sweden)	Olivier Delaître / Jean-Philippe Fleurian; Jan Apell / Jonas Björkman	1; 6	4; 6	4; 6
4	(France) (Sweden)	Cédric Pioline; Stefan Edberg	4; 6	3; 6	1; 6
5	(France) (Sweden)	Olivier Delaître; Henrik Holm	6; 4	6; 3

=== Russia vs. Czech Republic ===
Russia
3
Sports Forum, Saint Petersburg, Russia
15–17 July 1994
Carpet (indoors)

Czech Republic
2

			1	2	3	4	5
1	(Russia) (Czech Republic)	Yevgeny Kafelnikov; Sláva Doseděl	6; 2	6; 3	6; 4
2	(Russia) (Czech Republic)	Andrei Olhovskiy; Petr Korda	3; 6	2; 6	2; 6
3	(Russia) (Czech Republic)	Yevgeny Kafelnikov / Andrei Olhovskiy; Petr Korda / Cyril Suk	6; 3	4; 6	6; 4	3; 6	5; 7
4	(Russia) (Czech Republic)	Yevgeny Kafelnikov; Petr Korda	6; 4	6; 1	2; 6	6; 4
5	(Russia) (Czech Republic)	Andrei Olhovskiy; Sláva Doseděl	6; 2	2; 6	7^{7} 6^{3}	6; 3

=== Germany vs. Spain ===
Germany
3
Gerry Weber Stadion, Halle, Germany
15–17 July 1994
Grass

Spain
2

			1	2	3	4	5
1	(Germany) (Spain)	Marc-Kevin Goellner; Sergi Bruguera	6^{5} 7^{7}	3; 6	2; 6
2	(Germany) (Spain)	Michael Stich; Jordi Burillo	4; 6	6; 3	7^{7} 6^{4}	6; 2
3	(Germany) (Spain)	Karsten Braasch / Michael Stich; Sergi Bruguera / Tomás Carbonell	6; 3	7^{8} 6^{6}	6; 2
4	(Germany) (Spain)	Michael Stich; Sergi Bruguera	7^{7} 6^{4}	5; 7	7; 5	6; 2
5	(Germany) (Spain)	Marc-Kevin Goellner; Jordi Burillo	4; 6	4; 6

== Semifinals ==
=== Sweden vs. United States ===
Sweden
3
Scandinavium, Gothenburg, Sweden
23–25 September 1994
Carpet (indoors)

United States
2

			1	2	3	4	5
1	(Sweden) (United States)	Stefan Edberg; Todd Martin	2; 6	6; 2	4; 6	3; 6
2	(Sweden) (United States)	Magnus Larsson; Pete Sampras	7^{7} 6^{3}	4; 6	2; 6	6^{3} 7^{7}
3	(Sweden) (United States)	Jan Apell / Jonas Björkman; Jared Palmer / Jonathan Stark	6; 4	6; 4	3; 6	6; 2
4	(Sweden) (United States)	Stefan Edberg; Pete Sampras	6; 3					retired
5	(Sweden) (United States)	Magnus Larsson; Todd Martin	5; 7	6; 2	6; 2	6; 4

=== Germany vs. Russia ===
Germany
1
Deutscher Tennis Bund, Hamburg, Germany
23–25 September 1994
Hard

Russia
4

			1	2	3	4	5
1	(Germany) (Russia)	Bernd Karbacher; Yevgeny Kafelnikov	6^{2} 7^{7}	1; 6	6; 2	4; 6
2	(Germany) (Russia)	Michael Stich; Alexander Volkov	5; 7	6; 1	6^{5} 7^{7}	4; 6
3	(Germany) (Russia)	Karsten Braasch / Michael Stich; Yevgeny Kafelnikov / Andrei Olhovskiy	4; 6	6^{1} 7^{7}	6; 3	7^{7} 6^{3}	8; 10
4	(Germany) (Russia)	Michael Stich; Yevgeny Kafelnikov	5; 7	3; 6
5	(Germany) (Russia)	Bernd Karbacher; Alexander Volkov	6; 4	6; 1

== Final ==
=== Russia vs. Sweden ===
Russia
1
Olympic Stadium, Moscow, Russia
2–4 December 1994
Carpet (indoors)

Sweden
4

			1	2	3	4	5
1	(Russia) (Sweden)	Alexander Volkov; Stefan Edberg	4; 6	2; 6	7^{7} 6^{2}	6; 0	6; 8
2	(Russia) (Sweden)	Yevgeny Kafelnikov; Magnus Larsson	0; 6	2; 6	6; 3	6; 2	3; 6
3	(Russia) (Sweden)	Yevgeny Kafelnikov / Andrei Olhovskiy; Jan Apell / Jonas Björkman	7^{7} 6^{4}	2; 6	3; 6	6; 1	6; 8
4	(Russia) (Sweden)	Yevgeny Kafelnikov; Stefan Edberg	4; 6	6; 4	6; 0
5	(Russia) (Sweden)	Alexander Volkov; Magnus Larsson	6^{4} 7^{7}	4; 6
