= Great Britain Davis Cup team results =

National tennis team results

This is a list of the Great Britain Davis Cup team results since 1981, when the competition started being held in the current World Group format.

== Results ==
Year	Competition	Date	Surface	Venue	Opponent	Score	Result
1981	World Group, First round	6–8 Mar	Carpet (i)	Brighton (GBR)	Italy	3–2	Win
1981	World Group, Quarterfinals	9–11 Jul	Grass	Christchurch (NZL)	New Zealand	4–1	Win
1981	World Group, Semi-finals	2–4 Oct	Clay	Buenos Aires (ARG)	Argentina	0–5	Loss
1982	World Group, First round	5–7 Mar	Clay	Rome (ITA)	Italy	2–3	Loss
1982	World Group, Relegation Play-offs	1–3 Oct	Clay	Barcelona (ESP)	Spain	3–2	Win
1983	World Group, First round	4–6 Mar	Grass	Adelaide (AUS)	Australia	1–4	Loss
1983	World Group, Relegation Play-offs	30 Sep – 2 Oct	Grass	Eastbourne (GBR)	Chile	4–1	Win
1984	World Group, First round	24–26 Feb	Carpet (i)	Telford (GBR)	Italy	2–3	Loss
1984	World Group, Relegation Play-offs	28–30 Sep	Grass	Eastbourne (GBR)	Yugoslavia	1–4	Loss
1985	European Zone, Quarterfinals	14–16 Jun	Grass	Nottingham (GBR)	Portugal	5–0	Win
1985	European Zone, Semifinals	2–4 Aug	Grass	Eastbourne (GBR)	Switzerland	3–0	Win
1985	European Zone, Final	4–6 Oct	Grass	Eastbourne (GBR)	Israel	4–1	Win
1986	World Group, First round	7–9 Mar	Carpet (i)	Telford (GBR)	Spain	4–1	Win
1986	World Group, Quarterfinals	18–20 Jul	Grass	Wimbledon (GBR)	Australia	1–4	Loss
1987	World Group, First round	13–15 Mar	Clay	Mexico City (MEX)	Mexico	0–5	Loss
1987	World Group, Relegation Play-offs	24–26 Jul	Clay	Zagreb (YUG)	Yugoslavia	0–3	Loss
1988	Europe Zone Group I, Semi-finals	9–12 Jun	Grass	Bristol (GBR)	Finland	3–1	Win
1988	Europe Zone Group I, Final	22–24 Jul	Clay	Zell am See (AUT)	Austria	0–5	Loss
1989	Europe/Africa Zone Group I, Second round	5–7 May	Carpet (i)	Helsinki (FIN)	Finland	4–1	Win
1989	World Group, Qualifying Round	20–22 Jul	Grass	Eastbourne (GBR)	Argentina	2–3	Loss
1990	Europe/Africa Zone Group I, Second round	4–6 May	Clay	Bucharest (ROU)	Romania	3–2	Win
1990	World Group, Qualifying Round	21–23 Sep	Grass	London (GBR)	France	0–5	Loss
1991	Europe/Africa Zone Group I, Second round	3–5 May	Clay	Warsaw (POL)	Poland	4–1	Win
1991	World Group, Qualifying Round	20–22 Sep	Grass	Manchester (GBR)	Austria	3–1	Win
1992	World Group, First round	31 Jan – 2 Feb	Carpet (i)	Bayonne (FRA)	France	0–5	Loss
1992	World Group, Qualifying Round	25–27 Sep	Grass	New Delhi (IND)	India	1–4	Loss
1993	Europe/Africa Zone Group I, Second round	30 Apr – 2 May	Clay	Budapest (HUN)	Hungary	2–3	Loss
1994	Europe/Africa Zone Group I, First round	25–27 Mar	Clay	Porto (POR)	Portugal	1–4	Loss
1994	Europe/Africa Zone Group I, Relegation play-off	15–17 Jul	Grass	Manchester (GBR)	Romania	2–3	Loss
1995	Europe/Africa Zone Group II, First round	28–30 Apr	Clay	Bratislava (SVK)	Slovakia	0–5	Loss
1995	Europe/Africa Zone Group II, Relegation play-off	14–16 Jul	Grass	Eastbourne (GBR)	Monaco	5–0	Win
1996	Europe/Africa Zone Group II, First round	3–5 May	Carpet (i)	Newcastle (GBR)	Slovenia	4–1	Win
1996	Europe/Africa Zone Group II, Second round	12–14 Jul	Hard	Accra (GHA)	Ghana	5–0	Win
1996	Europe/Africa Zone Group II, Third round	20–22 Sep	Grass	Wimbledon (GBR)	Egypt	5–0	Win
1997	Europe/Africa Zone Group I, First round	4–6 Apr	Carpet (i)	London (GBR)	Zimbabwe	1–4	Loss
1997	Europe/Africa Zone Group I, First round play-off	11–13 Jul	Clay	Kyiv (UKR)	Ukraine	3–2	Win
1998	Europe/Africa Zone Group I, Second round	3–5 Apr	Carpet (i)	Newcastle (GBR)	Ukraine	5–0	Win
1998	World Group, Qualifying Round	25–27 Sep	Hard	Nottingham (GBR)	India	3–2	Win
1999	World Group, First round	2–4 Apr	Hard (i)	Birmingham (GBR)	United States	2–3	Loss
1999	World Group, Qualifying Round	24–26 Sep	Hard (i)	Birmingham (GBR)	South Africa	4–1	Win
2000	World Group, First round	4–6 Feb	Clay (i)	Ostrava (CZE)	Czech Republic	1–4	Loss
2000	World Group, Qualifying Round	14–16 Jul	Grass	Wimbledon (GBR)	Ecuador	2–3	Loss
2001	Europe/Africa Zone Group I, Second round	6–8 Apr	Carpet (i)	Birmingham (GBR)	Portugal	5–0	Win
2001	World Group, Qualifying Round	21–23 Sep	Clay	Guayaquil (ECU)	Ecuador	4–1	Win
2002	World Group, First round	8–10 Feb	Carpet (i)	Birmingham (GBR)	Sweden	2–3	Loss
2002	World Group, Qualifying Round	20–22 Sep	Carpet (i)	Birmingham (GBR)	Thailand	3–2	Win
2003	World Group, First round	7–9 Feb	Clay	Sydney (AUS)	Australia	1–4	Loss
2003	World Group, Play-offs	19–22 Sep	Clay	Casablanca (MAR)	Morocco	2–3	Loss
2004	Europe/Africa Zone Group I, Second round	9–11 Apr	Hard	Esch-sur-Alzette (LUX)	Luxembourg	4–1	Win
2004	World Group, Play-offs	24–26 Sep	Clay	Pörtschach (AUT)	Austria	2–3	Loss
2005	Europe/Africa Zone Group I, Second round	4–6 Mar	Hard	Ramat HaSharon (ISR)	Israel	3–2	Win
2005	World Group, Play-offs	23–25 Sep	Clay (i)	Geneva (SUI)	Switzerland	0–5	Loss
2006	Europe/Africa Zone Group I, Second round	7–6 Apr	Carpet (i)	Glasgow (GBR)	(Serbia and Montenegro) Serbia and Montenegro	2–3	Loss
2006	Europe/Africa Zone Group I, First Round Play–offs	21–23 Jul	Grass	Eastbourne (GBR)	Israel	2–3	Loss
2006	Europe/Africa Zone Group I, Second Round Play–offs	22–24 Sep	Clay	Odesa (UKR)	Ukraine	3–2	Win
2007	Europe/Africa Zone Group I, Second round	6–8 Apr	Hard (i)	Birmingham (GBR)	Netherlands	4–1	Win
2007	World Group, Play-offs	21–23 Sep	Grass	Wimbledon (GBR)	Croatia	4–1	Win
2008	World Group, First round	8–10 Feb	Clay	Buenos Aires (ARG)	Argentina [3]	1–4	Loss
2008	World Group, Play-offs	19–21 Sep	Grass	Wimbledon (GBR)	Austria	2–3	Loss
2009	Europe/Africa Zone Group I, Second round	6–8 Mar	Hard (i)	Glasgow (GBR)	Ukraine	1–4	Loss
2009	Europe/Africa Zone Group I, Second Round Play–offs	18–20 Sep	Hard (i)	Liverpool (GBR)	Poland	2–3	Loss
2010	Europe/Africa Zone Group II, First round	5–7 Mar	Hard (i)	Vilnius (LTU)	Lithuania	2–3	Loss
2010	Europe/Africa Zone Group II, Play-offs	9–11 Jul	Grass	Eastbourne (GBR)	Turkey	5–0	Win
2011	Europe/Africa Zone Group II, First round	4–6 Mar	Hard (i)	Bolton (GBR)	Tunisia	4–1	Win
2011	Europe/Africa Zone Group II, Second round	8–10 Jul	Hard (i)	Glasgow (GBR)	Luxembourg	4–1	Win
2011	Europe/Africa Zone Group II, Third round	16–18 Sep	Hard (i)	Glasgow (GBR)	Hungary	5–0	Win
2012	Europe/Africa Zone Group I, First round	10–12 Feb	Hard (i)	Glasgow (GBR)	Slovakia	3–2	Win
2012	Europe/Africa Zone Group I, Second round	6–18 Apr	Hard (i)	Glasgow (GBR)	Belgium	1–4	Loss
2013	Europe/Africa Zone Group I, Second round	5–7 Apr	Hard (i)	Coventry (GBR)	Russia	3–2	Win
2013	World Group, Play-offs	13–15 Sep	Clay	Umag (CRO)	Croatia	4–1	Win
2014	World Group, First round	31 Jan – 2 Feb	Clay	San Diego (USA)	United States [6]	3–1	Win
2014	World Group, Quarterfinals	4–6 Apr	Clay	Naples (ITA)	Italy	2–3	Loss
2015	World Group, First round	6–8 Mar	Hard (i)	Glasgow (GBR)	United States [7]	3–2	Win
2015	World Group, Quarterfinals	17–19 Jul	Grass	London (GBR)	France [1]	3–1	Win
2015	World Group, Semi-finals	18–20 Sep	Hard (i)	Glasgow (GBR)	Australia	3–2	Win
2015	World Group, Final	27–29 Nov	Clay (i)	Ghent (BEL)	Belgium	3–1	Champion
2016	World Group, First round	4–6 Mar	Hard (i)	Birmingham (GBR)	Japan	3–1	Win
2016	World Group, Quarterfinals	15–17 Jul	Clay	Belgrade (SRB)	Serbia [7]	3–2	Win
2016	World Group, Semi-finals	16–18 Sep	Hard (i)	Glasgow (GBR)	Argentina [6]	2–3	Loss
2017	World Group, First round	3–5 Feb	Hard (i)	Ottawa (CAN)	Canada	3-2	Win
2017	World Group, Quarterfinals	7–9 Apr	Clay (i)	Rouen (FRA)	France	1–4	Loss
2018	World Group, First round	2–4 Feb	Clay	Marbella (ESP)	Spain	1–3	Loss
2018	World Group, Play-offs	14–16 Sep	Hard (i)	Glasgow (GBR)	Uzbekistan	3–1	Win
