= 2002 Davis Cup World Group qualifying round =

Tennis tournament

The World Group qualifying round were the main play-offs of 2002 Davis Cup. Winners advanced to the World Group, and loser were relegated in the Zonal Regions I.

== Teams ==
Bold indicates team has qualified for the 2003 Davis Cup World Group.

From World Group

- **Netherlands**
- **Brazil**
- Morocco
- Slovakia
- **Switzerland**
- **Great Britain**
- **Germany**
- **Australia**

From Americas Group I

- Venezuela
- Canada

From Asia/Oceania Group I

- Thailand
- India

From Europe/Africa Group I

- **Belgium**
- Finland
- **Romania**
- Zimbabwe

== Results ==
Home team	Score	Visiting team	Location	Venue	Door	Surface
**Australia**	5–0	India	Adelaide	Memorial Drive	Outdoor	Hard
Zimbabwe	1–4	**Belgium**	Harare	City Sports Centre	Indoor	Hard
**Brazil**	4–0	Canada	Rio de Janeiro	Veiga-Almeida University	Outdoor	Clay
**Germany**	5–0	Venezuela	Karlsruhe	Europahalle Karlsruhe	Indoor	Hard
**Great Britain**	3–2	Thailand	Birmingham	National Indoor Arena	Indoor	Carpet
Finland	1–4	**Netherlands**	Turku	Turku Hall	Indoor	Carpet
Slovakia	1–4	**Romania**	Prešov	Mestska Hala	Indoor	Carpet
Morocco	2–3	**Switzerland**	Casablanca	Al Amal Complex	Outdoor	Clay

- Australia, Brazil, Germany, Great Britain, Netherlands and Switzerland will remain in the World Group in 2003.
- Belgium and Romania are promoted to the World Group in 2003.
- Canada, Finland, India, Thailand, Venezuela and Zimbabwe will remain in Zonal Group I in 2003.
- Morocco and Slovakia are relegated to Zonal Group I in 2003.

== Playoff results ==
=== Australia vs. India ===
Australia
5
Memorial Drive, Adelaide, Australia
20–22 September 2002
Hard

India
0

			1	2	3	4	5
1	(Australia) (India)	**Lleyton Hewitt**; Harsh Mankad	**6**; 1	**7^{7}** 6^{2}	**6**; 1
2	(Australia) (India)	**Wayne Arthurs**; Leander Paes	**6**; 4	3; **6**	**6**; 3	**6**; 4
3	(Australia) (India)	**Lleyton Hewitt / Todd Woodbridge**; Leander Paes / Vishal Uppal	**6**; 3	**7^{7}** 6^{5}	**6**; 1
4	(Australia) (India)	**Scott Draper**; Rohan Bopanna	**6**; 3	**7**; 5
5	(Australia) (India)	**Wayne Arthurs**; Harsh Mankad	**6**; 4	3; **6**	**7**; 5

=== Zimbabwe vs. Belgium ===
Zimbabwe
1
City Sports Centre, Harare, Zimbabwe
20–22 September 2002
Hard (i)

Belgium
4

			1	2	3	4	5
1	(Zimbabwe) (Belgium)	Wayne Black; **Xavier Malisse**	6^{1} **7^{7}**	**7^{9}** 6^{7}	5; **7**	3; **6**
2	(Zimbabwe) (Belgium)	Byron Black; **Olivier Rochus**	**7^{7}** 6^{4}	4; **6**	2; **6**	3; **6**
3	(Zimbabwe) (Belgium)	**Wayne Black / Kevin Ullyett**; Gilles Elseneer / Tom Vanhoudt	**6**; 1	2; **6**	**7^{8}** 6^{6}	**6**; 3
4	(Zimbabwe) (Belgium)	Byron Black; **Xavier Malisse**	3; **6**	6^{3} **7^{7}**	4; **6**
5	(Zimbabwe) (Belgium)	Genius Chidzikwe; **Gilles Elseneer**	1; **6**	4; **6**

=== Brazil vs. Canada ===
Brazil
4
Veiga-Almeida University, Rio de Janeiro, Brazil
20–22 September 2002
Clay

Canada
0

			1	2	3	4	5
1	(Brazil) (Canada)	**Fernando Meligeni**; Frank Dancevic	**6**; 2	**7**; 5	2; **6**	**7**; 5
2	(Brazil) (Canada)	**Gustavo Kuerten**; Daniel Nestor	**6**; 4	**7^{12}** 6^{10}	**6**; 0
3	(Brazil) (Canada)	**Gustavo Kuerten / André Sá**; Simon Larose / Daniel Nestor	4; **6**	**7^{7}** 6^{5}	**6**; 1	4; **6**	**6**; 2
4	(Brazil) (Canada)	**André Sá**; Frank Dancevic	**6**; 3	**6**; 2
5	(Brazil) (Canada)	Fernando Meligeni; Simon Larose						**not** **played**

=== Germany vs. Venezuela ===
Germany
5
Europahalle Karlsruhe, Karlsruhe, Germany
20–22 September 2002
Hard (i)

Venezuela
0

			1	2	3	4	5
1	(Germany) (Venezuela)	**Rainer Schüttler**; José de Armas	**6**; 1	**6**; 1	**6**; 1
2	(Germany) (Venezuela)	**Tommy Haas**; Jimy Szymanski	**6**; 1	**6**; 2	**6**; 1
3	(Germany) (Venezuela)	**Nicolas Kiefer / David Prinosil**; José de Armas / Jimy Szymanski	**6**; 1	**6**; 3	**6**; 0
4	(Germany) (Venezuela)	**Nicolas Kiefer**; Kepler Orellana	**6**; 1	**7**; 5
5	(Germany) (Venezuela)	**Rainer Schüttler**; Jimy Szymanski	**6**; 3	**6**; 0

=== Great Britain vs. Thailand ===
Great Britain
3
National Indoor Arena, Birmingham, Great Britain
20–22 September 2002
Carpet (i)

Thailand
2

			1	2	3	4	5
1	(United Kingdom) (Thailand)	**Tim Henman**; Danai Udomchoke	4; **6**	**6**; 3	**6**; 2	**6**; 2
2	(United Kingdom) (Thailand)	Martin Lee; **Paradorn Srichaphan**	0; **6**	6^{2} **7^{7}**	2; **6**
3	(United Kingdom) (Thailand)	**Tim Henman / Miles McLagan**; Paradorn Srichaphan / Danai Udomchoke	6^{4} **7^{7}**	**6**; 4	**7**; 5	**6**; 2
4	(United Kingdom) (Thailand)	**Tim Henman**; Paradorn Srichaphan	**6**; 3	**6**; 2	**6**; 3
5	(United Kingdom) (Thailand)	Arvind Parmar; **Danai Udomchoke**	3; **6**	1; **6**

=== Finland vs. Netherlands ===
Finland
1
Turku Hall, Turku, Finland
20–22 September 2002
Carpet (i)

Netherlands
4

			1	2	3	4	5
1	(Finland) (Netherlands)	Jarkko Nieminen; **Raemon Sluiter**	**6**; 4	6^{3} **7^{7}**	0; **6**	6^{8} **7^{10}**
2	(Finland) (Netherlands)	Tuomas Ketola; **Sjeng Schalken**	6^{13} **7^{15}**	3; **6**	3; **6**
3	(Finland) (Netherlands)	Tuomas Ketola / Jarkko Nieminen; **Paul Haarhuis / Sjeng Schalken**	1; **6**	4; **6**	4; **6**
4	(Finland) (Netherlands)	**Jarkko Nieminen**; Martin Verkerk	**6**; 2	**6**; 4
5	(Finland) (Netherlands)	Timo Nieminen; **Raemon Sluiter**	0; **6**	3; **6**

=== Slovakia vs. Romania ===
Slovakia
1
Mestská hala, Prešov, Slovakia
20–22 September 2002
Carpet (i)

Romania
4

			1	2	3	4	5
1	(Slovakia) (Romania)	**Dominik Hrbatý**; Adrian Voinea	**6**; 3	**6**; 4	3; **6**	**6**; 3
2	(Slovakia) (Romania)	Karol Kučera; **Andrei Pavel**	0; **6**	3; **6**	**7^{7}** 6^{3}	2; **6**
3	(Slovakia) (Romania)	Karol Beck / Dominik Hrbatý; **Andrei Pavel / Gabriel Trifu**	**7^{7}** 6^{4}	6^{5} **7^{7}**	6; **6**	3; **8**	6
4	(Slovakia) (Romania)	Dominik Hrbatý; **Andrei Pavel**	6^{1} **7^{7}**	2; **6**	2; **6**
5	(Slovakia) (Romania)	Karol Beck; **Victor Hănescu**	4; **6**	6^{1} **7^{7}**

=== Morocco vs. Switzerland ===
Morocco
2
Al Amal Complex, Casablanca, Morocco
20–22 September 2002
Clay

Switzerland
3

			1	2	3	4	5
1	(Morocco) (Switzerland)	**Younes El Aynaoui**; Michel Kratochvil	**7**; 5	**6**; 2	**6**; 2
2	(Morocco) (Switzerland)	Hicham Arazi; **Roger Federer**	3; **6**	2; **6**	1; **6**
3	(Morocco) (Switzerland)	Karim Alami / Younes El Aynaoui; **George Bastl / Roger Federer**	4; **6**	1; **6**	4; **6**
4	(Morocco) (Switzerland)	Younes El Aynaoui; **Roger Federer**	3; **6**	2; **6**	1; **6**
5	(Morocco) (Switzerland)	**Mounir El Aarej**; Michel Kratochvil	**6**; 2	**6**; 3
