= 2004 Davis Cup World Group =

- Date: 6 February – 5 December
- Edition: 24th

Champions
- Spain
- Davis Cup

The World Group was the highest level of Davis Cup competition in 2004. The first-round losers went into the Davis Cup World Group play-offs, and the winners progress to the quarterfinals. The quarterfinalists were guaranteed a World Group spot for 2005.

== Participating teams ==
Participating teams
Argentina	Australia	Austria	Belarus
Canada	Czech Republic	Croatia	France
Morocco	Netherlands	Romania	Russia
Spain	Sweden	Switzerland	United States

== Draw ==
First round 6–8 February
Adelaide, Australia (hard)
1	Australia	1
Sweden	4
Uncasville, United States (indoor hard)
7	United States	5
Austria	0
Minsk, Belarus (indoor carpet)
4	Russia	2
Belarus	3
Agadir, Morocco (indoor hard)
5	Argentina	5
Morocco	0
Bucharest, Romania (indoor clay)
Romania	2
6	Switzerland	3
Metz, France (indoor clay)
Croatia	1
3	France	4
Maastricht, Netherlands (indoor clay)
Canada	1
8	Netherlands	4
Brno, Czech Republic (indoor carpet)
Czech Republic	2
2	Spain	3

Quarterfinals; 9–11 April
Delray Beach, United States (hard)
Sweden	1
7	United States	4
Minsk, Belarus (indoor carpet)
Belarus	5
5	Argentina	0
Prilly, Switzerland (indoor hard)
6	Switzerland	2
3	France	3
Palma de Mallorca, Spain (clay)
8	Netherlands	1
2	Spain	4

Semifinals; 24–26 September
Charleston, United States (hard)
7	United States	4
Belarus	0
Alicante, Spain (clay)
3	France	1
2	Spain	4

Final; 3–5 December
Seville, Spain (indoor clay)
7	United States	2
2	Spain	3

== First round ==
=== Australia vs. Sweden ===
Australia
1
Memorial Drive, Adelaide, Australia
6–8 February 2004
Hard

Sweden
4

			1	2	3	4	5
1	(Australia) (Sweden)	Mark Philippoussis; Thomas Enqvist	3; 6	4; 6	2; 6
2	(Australia) (Sweden)	Lleyton Hewitt; Robin Söderling	6; 4	6; 3	6; 1
3	(Australia) (Sweden)	Wayne Arthurs / Todd Woodbridge; Jonas Björkman / Joachim Johansson	6^{5} 7^{7}	4; 6	6; 2	7^{7} 6^{4}	5; 7
4	(Australia) (Sweden)	Mark Philippoussis; Jonas Björkman	5; 7	2; 6	2; 6
5	(Australia) (Sweden)	Wayne Arthurs; Thomas Enqvist	6^{8} 7^{10}	6; 3	4; 6

=== United States vs. Austria ===
United States
5
Mohegan Sun Arena, Uncasville, United States
6–8 February 2004
Hard (i)

Austria
0

			1	2	3	4	5
1	(United States) (Austria)	Robby Ginepri; Jürgen Melzer	6^{6} 7^{8}	4; 6	6; 4	6; 4	6; 2
2	(United States) (Austria)	Andy Roddick; Stefan Koubek	6; 4	6; 4	6; 2
3	(United States) (Austria)	Bob Bryan / Mike Bryan; Julian Knowle / Jürgen Melzer	6; 2	6; 1	6; 4
4	(United States) (Austria)	Andy Roddick; Jürgen Melzer	6; 4	6; 2
5	(United States) (Austria)	Robby Ginepri; Stefan Koubek	7; 5	6; 2

=== Belarus vs. Russia ===
Belarus
3
Football Manege, Minsk, Belarus
6–8 February 2004
Carpet (i)

Russia
2

			1	2	3	4	5
1	(Belarus) (Russia)	Vladimir Voltchkov; Igor Andreev	7^{7} 6^{3}	6^{4} 7^{7}	7; 5	4; 4		retired
2	(Belarus) (Russia)	Max Mirnyi; Marat Safin	7^{7} 6^{3}	7^{7} 6^{5}	1; 6	4; 6	11; 9
3	(Belarus) (Russia)	Max Mirnyi / Alexander Shvets; Marat Safin / Mikhail Youzhny	4; 6	5; 7	6^{4} 7^{7}
4	(Belarus) (Russia)	Max Mirnyi; Igor Andreev	6; 3	6; 4	6; 4
5	(Belarus) (Russia)	Vladimir Voltchkov; Mikhail Youzhny	7; 5	6; 2	6; 4

=== Morocco vs. Argentina ===
Morocco
0
Salle Inbiaat, Agadir, Morocco
6–8 February 2004
Hard (i)

Argentina
5

			1	2	3	4	5
1	(Morocco) (Argentina)	Mounir El Aarej; Guillermo Coria	1; 6	1; 6	4; 6
2	(Morocco) (Argentina)	Hicham Arazi; David Nalbandian	6; 4	1; 6	5; 7	1; 2		retired
3	(Morocco) (Argentina)	Mounir El Aarej / Mehdi Tahiri; Agustín Calleri / Lucas Arnold Ker	1; 6	4; 6	2; 6
4	(Morocco) (Argentina)	Mehdi Tahiri; Guillermo Coria	2; 6	6^{4} 7^{7}
5	(Morocco) (Argentina)	Mounir El Aarej; Agustín Calleri	6^{1} 7^{7}	6; 3	1; 6

=== Romania vs. Switzerland ===
Romania
2
Sala Polivalentă, Bucharest, Romania
6–8 February 2004
Clay (i)

Switzerland
3

			1	2	3	4	5
1	(Romania) (Switzerland)	Andrei Pavel; Michel Kratochvil	6; 4	6; 3	5; 7	6; 4
2	(Romania) (Switzerland)	Victor Hănescu; Roger Federer	6^{4} 7^{7}	3; 6	1; 6
3	(Romania) (Switzerland)	Andrei Pavel / Gabriel Trifu; Yves Allegro / Roger Federer	4; 6	6; 1	3; 6	6; 3	8; 10
4	(Romania) (Switzerland)	Andrei Pavel; Roger Federer	3; 6	2; 6	5; 7
5	(Romania) (Switzerland)	Victor Hănescu; Stanislas Wawrinka	6; 3	6^{3} 7^{7}	6; 3

=== France vs. Croatia ===
France
4
Arènes de Metz, Metz, France
6–8 February 2004
Clay (i)

Croatia
1

			1	2	3	4	5
1	(France) (Croatia)	Arnaud Clément; Mario Ančić	6; 4	6; 3	6; 3
2	(France) (Croatia)	Thierry Ascione; Ivan Ljubičić	5; 7	4; 6	4; 6
3	(France) (Croatia)	Nicolas Escudé / Michaël Llodra; Mario Ančić / Ivo Karlović	6; 1	7^{7} 6^{5}	6; 3
4	(France) (Croatia)	Arnaud Clément; Ivan Ljubičić	6; 2	3; 6	7^{7} 6^{3}	6; 4
5	(France) (Croatia)	Nicolas Escudé; Ivo Karlović	7^{7} 6^{5}	6; 2

=== Netherlands vs. Canada ===
Netherlands
4
MECC, Maastricht, Netherlands
6–8 February 2004
Clay (i)

Canada
1

			1	2	3	4	5
1	(Netherlands) (Canada)	Sjeng Schalken; Frank Dancevic	6; 3	5; 7	6; 2	6; 1
2	(Netherlands) (Canada)	Martin Verkerk; Simon Larose	6; 4	7^{11} 6^{9}	4; 6	6; 3
3	(Netherlands) (Canada)	Paul Haarhuis / Martin Verkerk; Daniel Nestor / Frédéric Niemeyer	6^{10} 7^{12}	0; 1				retired
4	(Netherlands) (Canada)	Martin Verkerk; Frank Dancevic	6^{5} 7^{7}	6; 2	7; 5	6; 3
5	(Netherlands) (Canada)	Sjeng Schalken; Simon Larose	6; 2	7; 5

=== Czech Republic vs. Spain ===
Czech Republic
2
Brno Exhibition Center, Brno, Czech Republic
6–8 February 2004
Carpet (i)

Spain
3

			1	2	3	4	5
1	(Czech Republic) (Spain)	Jiří Novák; Rafael Nadal	7^{7} 6^{2}	6; 3	7^{7} 6^{3}
2	(Czech Republic) (Spain)	Radek Štěpánek; Tommy Robredo	5; 7	6; 3	6^{4} 7^{7}	6^{7} 7^{9}
3	(Czech Republic) (Spain)	Jiří Novák / Radek Štěpánek; Rafael Nadal / Tommy Robredo	6; 4	7^{8} 6^{6}	6; 3
4	(Czech Republic) (Spain)	Tomáš Berdych; Feliciano López	4; 6	7^{7} 6^{2}	3; 6	2; 6
5	(Czech Republic) (Spain)	Radek Štěpánek; Rafael Nadal	6^{2} 7^{7}	6^{4} 7^{7}	3; 6

== Quarterfinals ==
=== United States vs. Sweden ===
United States
4
Delray Beach Tennis Center, Delray Beach, United States
9–11 April 2004
Hard

Sweden
1

			1	2	3	4	5
1	(United States) (Sweden)	Mardy Fish; Jonas Björkman	6; 4	3; 6	2; 6	5; 7
2	(United States) (Sweden)	Andy Roddick; Thomas Enqvist	6; 4	7; 5	6; 2
3	(United States) (Sweden)	Bob Bryan / Mike Bryan; Jonas Björkman / Thomas Johansson	6; 3	6; 3	6; 4
4	(United States) (Sweden)	Andy Roddick; Jonas Björkman	7^{7} 6^{3}	6; 4	6; 0
5	(United States) (Sweden)	Mardy Fish; Thomas Johansson	3; 6	6; 1	6; 4

=== Belarus vs. Argentina ===
Belarus
5
Football Manege, Minsk, Belarus
9–11 April 2004
Carpet (i)

Argentina
0

			1	2	3	4	5
1	(Belarus) (Argentina)	Vladimir Voltchkov; Agustín Calleri	6; 3	6; 4	6; 2
2	(Belarus) (Argentina)	Max Mirnyi; Guillermo Cañas	6; 2	6; 2	6; 2
3	(Belarus) (Argentina)	Max Mirnyi / Vladimir Voltchkov; Lucas Arnold Ker / Agustín Calleri	6; 3	6; 4	6; 1
4	(Belarus) (Argentina)	Max Mirnyi; Lucas Arnold Ker	6; 1	6; 2
5	(Belarus) (Argentina)	Vladimir Voltchkov; Juan Mónaco	3; 6	6; 3	6; 3

=== Switzerland vs. France ===
Switzerland
2
Centre Intercommunal de Glace de Malley, Prilly, Switzerland
9–11 April 2004
Hard (i)

France
3

			1	2	3	4	5
1	(Switzerland) (France)	Roger Federer; Nicolas Escudé	6; 2	6; 4	6; 4
2	(Switzerland) (France)	Ivo Heuberger; Arnaud Clément	3; 6	3; 6	2; 6
3	(Switzerland) (France)	Yves Allegro / Roger Federer; Nicolas Escudé / Michaël Llodra	7^{7} 6^{4}	3; 6	6^{5} 7^{7}	3; 6
4	(Switzerland) (France)	Roger Federer; Arnaud Clément	6; 2	7; 5	6; 4
5	(Switzerland) (France)	Michel Kratochvil; Nicolas Escudé	6^{3} 7^{7}	4; 6	6^{6} 7^{8}

=== Spain vs. Netherlands ===
Spain
4
Plaza de Toros Coliseo, Palma de Mallorca, Spain
9–11 April 2004
Clay

Netherlands
1

			1	2	3	4	5
1	(Spain) (Netherlands)	Carlos Moyá; Martin Verkerk	6; 2	7; 5	6; 4
2	(Spain) (Netherlands)	Juan Carlos Ferrero; Raemon Sluiter	6; 2	6; 2	6; 4
3	(Spain) (Netherlands)	Rafael Nadal / Tommy Robredo; John van Lottum / Martin Verkerk	6; 3	6; 2	3; 6	2; 6	2; 6
4	(Spain) (Netherlands)	Juan Carlos Ferrero; Martin Verkerk	6; 4	6^{5} 7^{7}	4; 6	7; 5	6; 1
5	(Spain) (Netherlands)	Carlos Moyá; Sjeng Schalken	6; 3	6; 4

== Semifinals ==
=== United States vs. Belarus ===
United States
4
Family Circle Tennis Center, Charleston, United States
24–26 September 2004
Hard

Belarus
0

			1	2	3	4	5
1	(United States) (Belarus)	Andy Roddick; Vladimir Voltchkov	6; 1	6; 4	6; 4
2	(United States) (Belarus)	Mardy Fish; Max Mirnyi	7; 5	6; 2	3; 6	6; 3
3	(United States) (Belarus)	Bob Bryan / Mike Bryan; Max Mirnyi / Vladimir Voltchkov	6; 1	6; 3	7; 5
4	(United States) (Belarus)	Andy Roddick; Alexander Skrypko	6; 4	6; 2
5	(United States) (Belarus)	Mardy Fish; Andrei Karatchenia	3; 0					not completed

=== Spain vs. France ===
Spain
4
Plaza de Toros de Alicante, Alicante, Spain
24–26 September 2004
Clay

France
1

			1	2	3	4	5
1	(Spain) (France)	Carlos Moyá; Paul-Henri Mathieu	3; 6	6; 3	6; 2	3; 6	3; 6
2	(Spain) (France)	Juan Carlos Ferrero; Fabrice Santoro	6; 3	6; 1	1; 6	6; 3
3	(Spain) (France)	Rafael Nadal / Tommy Robredo; Arnaud Clément / Michaël Llodra	7^{7} 6^{4}	4; 6	6; 2	2; 6	6; 3
4	(Spain) (France)	Rafael Nadal; Arnaud Clément	6; 4	6; 1	6; 2
5	(Spain) (France)	Tommy Robredo; Paul-Henri Mathieu	6; 4	6; 4

== Final ==
=== Spain vs. United States ===
Spain
3
Estadio Olímpico, Seville, Spain
3–5 December 2004
Clay (i)

United States
2

			1	2	3	4	5
1	(Spain) (United States)	Carlos Moyà; Mardy Fish	6; 4	6; 2	6; 3
2	(Spain) (United States)	Rafael Nadal; Andy Roddick	6^{6} 7^{8}	6; 2	7^{8} 6^{6}	6; 2
3	(Spain) (United States)	Juan Carlos Ferrero / Tommy Robredo; Bob Bryan / Mike Bryan	0; 6	3; 6	2; 6
4	(Spain) (United States)	Carlos Moyà; Andy Roddick	6; 2	7^{7} 6^{1}	7^{7} 6^{5}
5	(Spain) (United States)	Tommy Robredo; Mardy Fish	6^{8} 7^{10}	2; 6
