= 2002 Davis Cup Americas Zone Group I =

International tennis competition

The Americas Zone was one of the three zones of the regional Davis Cup competition in 2002.

In the Americas Zone there were four different tiers, called groups, in which teams competed against each other to advance to the upper tier. Winners in Group I advanced to the World Group qualifying round, along with losing teams from the World Group first round. Teams who lost their respective ties competed in the relegation play-offs, with winning teams remaining in Group I, whereas teams who lost their play-offs were relegated to the Americas Zone Group II in 2003.

== Participating nations ==
- Bahamas
- Canada
- Chile
- Ecuador
- Mexico
- Venezuela

=== Draw ===
Second Round Play-offs
Nassau, Bahamas (hard)
Bahamas	3
Mexico	2

First Round Play-offs
Guayaquil, Ecuador (clay)
Ecuador	5
Bahamas	0
Querétaro, Mexico (indoor carpet)
Mexico	2
Chile	3

First Round
S	Ecuador
bye
Nassau, Bahamas (hard)
Venezuela	3
Bahamas	2
Waterloo, Canada (indoor carpet)
Canada	4
Mexico	1
bye
S	Chile

Second Round
Barquisimeto, Venezuela (hard)
S	Ecuador	2
Venezuela	3
Calgary, Canada (indoor carpet)
Canada	5
S	Chile	0

- Mexico relegated to Group II in 2003.
- Venezuela and Canada advance to World Group Play-off.

== First round ==
=== Bahamas vs. Venezuela ===
Bahamas
2
Nassau, Bahamas
8–10 February 2002
Hard

Venezuela
3

			1	2	3	4	5
1	(The Bahamas) (Venezuela)	Mark Merklein; José de Armas	4; 6	6; 3	2; 6	3; 6
2	(The Bahamas) (Venezuela)	Mark Knowles; Jimy Szymanski	6; 1	6; 3	6; 3
3	(The Bahamas) (Venezuela)	Mark Knowles / Mark Merklein; José de Armas / Jimy Szymanski	2; 6	6; 3	6; 4	6; 4
4	(The Bahamas) (Venezuela)	Mark Knowles; José de Armas	3; 6	7; 5	3; 6	6^{3} 7^{7}
5	(The Bahamas) (Venezuela)	Mark Merklein; Jimy Szymanski	4; 6	3; 6	1; 6

=== Canada vs. Mexico ===
Canada
4
Ontario, Canada
8–10 February 2002
Carpet (indoors)

Mexico
1

			1	2	3	4	5
1	(Canada) (Mexico)	Frédéric Niemeyer; Alejandro Hernández	5; 7	6; 3	6; 4	7; 5
2	(Canada) (Mexico)	Daniel Nestor; Miguel Gallardo-Valles	6; 3	6; 4	6; 0
3	(Canada) (Mexico)	Daniel Nestor / Frédéric Niemeyer; Santiago González / Alejandro Hernández	6; 1	6; 1	6; 1
4	(Canada) (Mexico)	Frank Dancevic; Miguel Gallardo-Valles	3; 6	0; 6
5	(Canada) (Mexico)	Simon Larose; Santiago González	6^{5} 7^{7}	6; 2	6; 2

== Second round ==
=== Venezuela vs. Ecuador ===
Venezuela
3
Airport Tennis Complex, Barquisimeto, Venezuela
5–7 April 2002
Hard

Ecuador
2

			1	2	3	4	5
1	(Venezuela) (Ecuador)	José de Armas; Luis Morejón	6; 4	6; 3	4; 6	6; 2
2	(Venezuela) (Ecuador)	Jimy Szymanski; Nicolás Lapentti	6; 3	3; 6	5; 7	6; 3	4; 6
3	(Venezuela) (Ecuador)	José de Armas / Jimy Szymanski; Giovanni Lapentti / Nicolás Lapentti	7; 5	6; 2	7^{9} 6^{7}
4	(Venezuela) (Ecuador)	José de Armas; Nicolás Lapentti	1; 6	3; 6	7^{7} 6^{5}	6; 4	3; 6
5	(Venezuela) (Ecuador)	Jimy Szymanski; Luis Morejón	4; 6	6; 3	6; 3	6; 2

=== Canada vs. Chile ===
Canada
5
Stampede Corral, Calgary, Alberta, Canada
5–7 April 2002
Carpet (indoors)

Chile
0

			1	2	3	4	5
1	(Canada) (Chile)	Daniel Nestor; Marcelo Ríos	7^{7} 6^{1}	6^{2} 7^{7}	6; 3	1; 6	7; 5
2	(Canada) (Chile)	Frédéric Niemeyer; Fernando González	6^{2} 7^{7}	7^{7} 6^{2}	4; 6	6; 3	6; 4
3	(Canada) (Chile)	Daniel Nestor / Frédéric Niemeyer; Hermes Gamonal / Fernando González	6; 3	6; 0	6; 2
4	(Canada) (Chile)	Frank Dancevic; Guillermo Hormazábal	6; 1	6; 4
5	(Canada) (Chile)	Simon Larose; Hermes Gamonal	6; 3	7^{7} 6^{5}

== First round play-offs ==
=== Ecuador vs. Bahamas ===
Ecuador
5
Guayaquil T.C., Guayaquil, Ecuador
12–14 July 2002
Clay

Bahamas
0

			1	2	3	4	5
1	(Ecuador) (The Bahamas)	Jhony de Leon; Dentry Mortimer	6; 3	6; 1	6; 1
2	(Ecuador) (The Bahamas)	Luis Morejón; Bjorn Munroe	6; 3	6; 3	6; 0
3	(Ecuador) (The Bahamas)	Carlos Avellán / Luis Morejón; Devin Mullings / Bjorn Munroe	6; 2	6; 3	6; 2
4	(Ecuador) (The Bahamas)	Carlos Avellán; Bjorn Munroe	6; 1	7^{8} 6^{6}
5	(Ecuador) (The Bahamas)	Martin Stiegwardt; Devin Mullings	3; 6	6; 1	6; 1

=== Mexico vs. Chile ===
Mexico
2
Josefa Ortiz-Domínguez Stadium, Querétaro, Mexico
12–14 July 2002
Carpet (indoors)

Chile
3

			1	2	3	4	5
1	(Mexico) (Chile)	Alejandro Hernández; Nicolás Massú	3; 6	1; 6	0; 6
2	(Mexico) (Chile)	Marcelo Amador; Marcelo Ríos	5; 7	7^{7} 6^{3}	3; 6	2; 6
3	(Mexico) (Chile)	Bruno Echagaray / Santiago González; Nicolás Massú / Marcelo Ríos	6; 3	3; 6	6; 3	6; 2
4	(Mexico) (Chile)	Alejandro Hernández; Marcelo Ríos	7^{7} 6^{5}	3; 6	2; 6	6; 0	6; 2
5	(Mexico) (Chile)	Marcelo Amador; Nicolás Massú	3; 6	4; 6	4; 6

== Second round play-offs ==
=== Bahamas vs. Mexico ===
Bahamas
3
BLTA National Tennis Centre, Nassau, Bahamas
20–22 September 2002
Hard

Mexico
2

			1	2	3	4	5
1	(The Bahamas) (Mexico)	Mark Merklein; Miguel Gallardo-Valles	7; 5	0; 6	4; 6	6^{5} 7^{7}
2	(The Bahamas) (Mexico)	Mark Knowles; Alejandro Hernández	6^{4} 7^{7}	6; 2	1; 6	6; 1	6; 4
3	(The Bahamas) (Mexico)	Mark Knowles / Mark Merklein; Bruno Echagaray / Santiago González	6; 3	6; 4	6; 2
4	(The Bahamas) (Mexico)	Mark Knowles; Miguel Gallardo-Valles	6^{6} 7^{8}	6; 3	1; 6	0; 1
5	(The Bahamas) (Mexico)	Mark Merklein; Alejandro Hernández	6; 2	6; 3	6; 4
