= 2004 Davis Cup World Group play-offs =

The World Group play-offs were the main play-offs of 2004 Davis Cup. Winners advanced to the World Group, and loser were relegated in the Zonal Regions I.

== Teams ==
Bold indicates team has qualified for the 2005 Davis Cup World Group.

From World Group

- **Australia**
- **Austria**
- **Russia**
- Morocco
- **Romania**
- **Croatia**
- Canada
- **Czech Republic**

From Americas Group I

- Paraguay
- **Chile**

From Asia/Oceania Group I

- Thailand
- Japan

From Europe/Africa Group I

- Germany
- Great Britain
- Belgium
- **Slovakia**

== Results ==
**Seeded teams**

- Australia
- Chile
- Croatia
- Czech Republic
- Germany
- Great Britain
- Romania
- Russia

**Unseeded teams**

- Austria
- Belgium
- Canada
- Japan
- Morocco
- Paraguay
- Slovakia
- Thailand

Home team	Score	Visiting team	Location	Venue	Door	Surface
**Australia**	4–1	Morocco	West Perth	Royal Kings Park	Outdoor	Grass
**Chile**	5–0	Japan	Viña del Mar	Club Naval de Campo Las Salinas	Outdoor	Clay
**Croatia**	3–2	Belgium	Rijeka	Dvorana Mladosti	Indoor	Carpet
Paraguay	0–5	**Czech Republic**	Lambaré	Yacht y Golf Club Paraguayo	Outdoor	Clay
**Slovakia**	3–2	Germany	Bratislava	National Tennis Centre	Indoor	Hard
**Austria**	3–2	Great Britain	Pörtschach	Werzer Arena Pörtschach	Outdoor	Clay
**Romania**	4–1	Canada	Bucharest	Clubul Sportiv Progresul Bucuresti	Outdoor	Clay
**Russia**	5–0	Thailand	Moscow	Olympic Stadium	Indoor	Clay

- Australia, Austria, Croatia, Czech Republic, Romania and Russia will remain in the World Group in 2005.
- Chile and Slovakia are promoted to the World Group in 2005.
- Belgium, Germany, Great Britain, Japan, Paraguay and Thailand will remain in Zonal Group I in 2005.
- Canada and Morocco are relegated to Zonal Group I in 2005.

== Playoff results ==
=== Australia vs. Morocco ===
Australia
4
Royal Kings Park, West Perth, Australia
24–26 September 2004
Grass

Morocco
1

			1	2	3	4	5
1	(Australia) (Morocco)	**Wayne Arthurs**; Mounir El Aarej	**7^{8}** 6^{6}	**6**; 4	**6**; 3
2	(Australia) (Morocco)	**Lleyton Hewitt**; Mehdi Tahiri	**6**; 0	**6**; 2	**6**; 2
3	(Australia) (Morocco)	**Wayne Arthurs / Todd Woodbridge**; Mounir El Aarej / Mehdi Tahiri	**7^{10}** 6^{8}	**7^{7}** 6^{2}	**6**; 3
4	(Australia) (Morocco)	Todd Reid; **Mounir El Aarej**	2; **6**	3; **6**
5	(Australia) (Morocco)	**Todd Woodbridge**; Mehdi Ziadi	**6**; 0	**6**; 2

=== Chile vs. Japan ===
Chile
5
Club Naval de Campo Las Salinas, Viña del Mar, Chile
24–26 September 2004
Clay

Japan
0

			1	2	3	4	5
1	(Chile) (Japan)	**Nicolás Massú**; Gouichi Motomura	**6**; 1	**6**; 1	**6**; 1
2	(Chile) (Japan)	**Fernando González**; Takao Suzuki	**6**; 4	**6**; 2	**7^{7}** 6^{1}
3	(Chile) (Japan)	**Fernando González / Nicolás Massú**; Thomas Shimada / Takao Suzuki	**6**; 3	**6**; 3	**6**; 1
4	(Chile) (Japan)	**Hermes Gamonal**; Takao Suzuki	**7**; 5	2; **6**	**6**; 2
5	(Chile) (Japan)	**Fernando González**; Gouichi Motomura	**6**; 3	**6**; 3

=== Croatia vs. Belgium ===
Croatia
3
Dvorana Mladosti, Rijeka, Croatia
24–26 September 2004
Carpet (i)

Belgium
2

			1	2	3	4	5
1	(Croatia) (Belgium)	**Ivan Ljubičić**; Gilles Elseneer	**7^{8}** 6^{6}	**7**; 5	**6**; 4
2	(Croatia) (Belgium)	**Mario Ančić**; Olivier Rochus	**6**; 3	**7^{7}** 6^{2}	**6**; 1
3	(Croatia) (Belgium)	**Mario Ančić / Ivan Ljubičić**; Dick Norman / Kristof Vliegen	6^{8} **7^{10}**	**6**; 4	6^{1} **7^{7}**	**6**; 3	**7**; 5
4	(Croatia) (Belgium)	Saša Tuksar; **Olivier Rochus**	**6**; 4	3; **6**	3; **6**
5	(Croatia) (Belgium)	Mario Ančić; **Gilles Elseneer**	6^{4} **7^{7}**	1; 2				**retired**

=== Paraguay vs. Czech Republic ===
Paraguay
0
Yacht y Golf Club Paraguayo, Lambaré, Paraguay
24–26 September 2004
Clay

Czech Republic
5

			1	2	3	4	5
1	(Paraguay) (Czech Republic)	Paulo Carvallo; **Jiří Novák**	**6**; 3	4; **6**	5; **7**	3; **6**
2	(Paraguay) (Czech Republic)	Ramón Delgado; **Tomáš Berdych**	**6**; 3	**6**; 4	3; **6**	2; **6**	4; **6**
3	(Paraguay) (Czech Republic)	Paulo Carvallo / Ramón Delgado; **Jiří Novák / Radek Štěpánek**	2; **6**	5; **7**	3; **6**
4	(Paraguay) (Czech Republic)	Ramón Delgado; **Radek Štěpánek**	4; **6**	2; **6**
5	(Paraguay) (Czech Republic)	Francisco Rodríguez; **Michal Tabara**	3; **6**	1; **6**

=== Slovakia vs. Germany ===
Slovakia
3
National Tennis Centre, Bratislava, Slovakia
24–26 September 2004
Hard (i)

Germany
2

			1	2	3	4	5
1	(Slovakia) (Germany)	**Dominik Hrbatý**; Florian Mayer	**6**; 3	**6**; 1	**6**; 3
2	(Slovakia) (Germany)	Karol Beck; **Tommy Haas**	**7^{7}** 6^{2}	1; **6**	1; **6**	1; **6**
3	(Slovakia) (Germany)	Dominik Hrbatý / Karol Kučera; **Tommy Haas / Alexander Waske**	3; **6**	3; **6**	**6**; 3	**6**; 4	3; **6**
4	(Slovakia) (Germany)	**Dominik Hrbatý**; Tommy Haas	**6**; 3	**6**; 3	**7**; 5
5	(Slovakia) (Germany)	**Karol Kučera**; Florian Mayer	**6**; 4	**6**; 0	**6**; 2

=== Austria vs. Great Britain ===
Austria
3
Werzer Arena Pörtschach, Pörtschach, Austria
24-26 September 2004
Clay

Great Britain
2

			1	2	3	4	5
1	(Austria) (United Kingdom)	**Stefan Koubek**; Tim Henman	**6**; 3	**6**; 3	**6**; 1
2	(Austria) (United Kingdom)	Jürgen Melzer; **Greg Rusedski**	**6**; 3	3; **6**	4; **6**	6^{4} **7^{7}**
3	(Austria) (United Kingdom)	**Julian Knowle / Alexander Peya**; Tim Henman / Greg Rusedski	**6**; 4	1; **6**	**6**; 2	**6**; 1
4	(Austria) (United Kingdom)	Jürgen Melzer; **Tim Henman**	**6**; 0	2; **6**	6^{4} **7^{7}**	2; **6**
5	(Austria) (United Kingdom)	**Stefan Koubek**; Greg Rusedski	**7^{7}** 6^{2}	**6**; 4	**7**; 5

=== Romania vs. Canada ===
Romania
4
Clubul Sportiv Progresul Bucuresti, Bucharest, Romania
24–26 September 2004
Clay

Canada
1

			1	2	3	4	5
1	(Romania) (Canada)	**Andrei Pavel**; Simon Larose	**7**; 5	**6**; 3	**6**; 2
2	(Romania) (Canada)	**Victor Hănescu**; Frank Dancevic	5; **7**	**6**; 3	3; **6**	**6**; 3	**6**; 4
3	(Romania) (Canada)	Victor Ioniță / Florin Mergea; **Daniel Nestor / Frédéric Niemeyer**	4; **6**	4; **6**	**6**; 2	2; **6**
4	(Romania) (Canada)	**Andrei Pavel**; Frank Dancevic	**6**; 2	**6**; 4	**6**; 2
5	(Romania) (Canada)	**Victor Ioniță**; Simon Larose	4; 2					**retired**

=== Russia vs. Thailand ===
Russia
5
Olympic Stadium, Moscow, Russia
24–26 September 2004
Clay (i)

Thailand
0

			1	2	3	4	5
1	(Russia) (Thailand)	**Igor Andreev**; Paradorn Srichaphan	**7**; 5	**6**; 2	**6**; 4
2	(Russia) (Thailand)	**Marat Safin**; Danai Udomchoke	**6**; 4	**6**; 1	**6**; 2
3	(Russia) (Thailand)	**Marat Safin / Mikhail Youzhny**; Sanchai Ratiwatana / Sonchat Ratiwatana	**6**; 2	**6**; 1	**6**; 4
4	(Russia) (Thailand)	**Nikolay Davydenko**; Sonchat Ratiwatana	**6**; 2	**6**; 0
5	(Russia) (Thailand)	**Mikhail Youzhny**; Sanchai Ratiwatana	**6**; 4	**6**; 2
