= 2003 Davis Cup World Group play-offs =

The World Group playoffs were the main playoffs of 2003 Davis Cup. Winners advanced to the World Group, and losers were relegated in the Zonal Regions I.

== Teams ==
Bold indicates team has qualified for the 2004 Davis Cup World Group.

From World Group

- **Romania**
- **Netherlands**
- Great Britain
- Brazil
- **United States**
- Belgium
- Germany
- **Czech Republic**

From Americas Group I

- Ecuador
- **Canada**

From Asia/Oceania Group I

- India
- Thailand

From Europe/Africa Group I

- Slovakia
- **Austria**
- **Belarus**
- **Morocco**

== Results ==
**Seeded teams**

- Belgium
- Brazil
- Czech Republic
- Germany
- Great Britain
- Netherlands
- Romania
- United States

**Unseeded teams**

- Austria
- Belarus
- Canada
- Ecuador
- India
- Morocco
- Slovakia
- Thailand

Home team	Score	Visiting team	Location	Venue	Door	Surface
**Austria**	3–2	Belgium	Pörtschach	Werzer Arena Pörtschach	Outdoor	Clay
**Canada**	3–2	Brazil	Calgary	Stampede Corral	Indoor	Carpet
Thailand	1–4	**Czech Republic**	Bangkok	Impact, Muang Thong Thani	Indoor	Hard
Germany	2–3	**Belarus**	Sundern	TC Blau-Weiss Sundern	Outdoor	Clay
**Morocco**	3–2	Great Britain	Casablanca	Complex Sportif Al Amal	Outdoor	Clay
**Netherlands**	5–0	India	Zwolle	IJsselhallen	Indoor	Hard
Ecuador	2–3	**Romania**	Quito	Quito Tenis Y Golf Club	Outdoor	Clay
Slovakia	2–3	**United States**	Bratislava	National Tennis Centre	Outdoor	Clay

- Czech Republic, Netherlands, Romania and United States will remain in the World Group in 2004.
- Austria, Belarus, Canada and Morocco are promoted to the World Group in 2004.
- Ecuador, India, Slovakia and Thailand will remain in Zonal Group I in 2004.
- Belgium, Brazil, Germany and Great Britain are relegated to Zonal Group I in 2004.

== Playoff results ==
=== Austria vs. Belgium ===
Austria
3
Werzer Arena Pörtschach, Pörtschach, Austria
19-22 September 2003
Clay

Belgium
2

			1	2	3	4	5
1	(Austria) (Belgium)	**Stefan Koubek**; Christophe Rochus	**6**; 2	**6**; 4	**6**; 1
2	(Austria) (Belgium)	**Jürgen Melzer**; Olivier Rochus	**6**; 1	**7^{7}** 6^{4}	5; **7**	2; **6**	**6**; 1
3	(Austria) (Belgium)	Julian Knowle / Alexander Peya; **Olivier Rochus / Kristof Vliegen**	**6**; 4	1; **6**	4; **6**	2; **6**
4	(Austria) (Belgium)	**Stefan Koubek**; Olivier Rochus	6^{4} **7^{7}**	**6**; 2	**7**; 5	4; **6**	**6**; 3
5	(Austria) (Belgium)	Jürgen Melzer; **Kristof Vliegen**	5; **7**	4; **6**

=== Canada vs. Brazil ===
Canada
3
Stampede Corral, Calgary, Canada
19-22 September 2003
Carpet (i)

Brazil
2

			1	2	3	4	5
1	(Canada) (Brazil)	Frédéric Niemeyer; **Flávio Saretta**	4; **6**	6^{5} **7^{7}**	**7^{7}** 6^{4}	4; **6**
2	(Canada) (Brazil)	**Daniel Nestor**; Gustavo Kuerten	6^{7} **7^{9}**	**7^{7}** 6^{0}	**6**; 3	6^{7} **7^{9}**	**7**; 5
3	(Canada) (Brazil)	**Daniel Nestor / Frédéric Niemeyer**; Gustavo Kuerten / André Sá	**6**; 3	**6**; 2	1; **6**	**6**; 2
4	(Canada) (Brazil)	Simon Larose; **Gustavo Kuerten**	6^{4} **7^{7}**	6^{4} **7^{7}**	**6**; 3	6^{10} **7^{12}**
5	(Canada) (Brazil)	**Frank Dancevic**; Flávio Saretta	**6**; 3	**7**; 5	3; **6**	**7^{9}** 6^{7}

=== Thailand vs. Czech Republic ===
Thailand
1
Impact, Muang Thong Thani, Bangkok, Thailand
19-22 September 2003
Hard (i)

Czech Republic
4

			1	2	3	4	5
1	(Thailand) (Czech Republic)	Danai Udomchoke; **Jiří Novák**	2; **6**	2; **6**	6^{1} **7^{7}**
2	(Thailand) (Czech Republic)	**Paradorn Srichaphan**; Bohdan Ulihrach	**7^{7}** 6^{2}	**6**; 2	**7^{7}** 6^{4}
3	(Thailand) (Czech Republic)	Paradorn Srichaphan / Danai Udomchoke; **Tomáš Berdych / Jiří Novák**	3; **6**	6^{3} **7^{7}**	4; **6**
4	(Thailand) (Czech Republic)	Paradorn Srichaphan; **Jiří Novák**	4; **6**	4; **6**	4; **6**
5	(Thailand) (Czech Republic)	Danai Udomchoke; **Tomáš Berdych**	6^{2} **7^{7}**	3; **6**

=== Germany vs. Belarus ===
Germany
2
TC Blau-Weiss Sundern, Sundern, Germany
19-22 September 2003
Clay

Belarus
3

			1	2	3	4	5
1	(Germany) (Belarus)	Tomas Behrend; **Max Mirnyi**	**7**; 5	**6**; 2	6^{6} **7^{8}**	2; **6**	4; **6**
2	(Germany) (Belarus)	**Rainer Schüttler**; Vladimir Voltchkov	**6**; 3	3; **6**	6^{3} **7^{7}**	**6**; 4	**6**; 4
3	(Germany) (Belarus)	Nicolas Kiefer / Rainer Schuettler; **Max Mirnyi / Vladimir Voltchkov**	3; **6**	**6**; 3	5; **7**	5; **7**
4	(Germany) (Belarus)	Rainer Schüttler; **Max Mirnyi**	3; **6**	5; **7**	3; **6**
5	(Germany) (Belarus)	**Lars Burgsmüller**; Alexander Skrypko	**6**; 2	**6**; 0

=== Morocco vs. Great Britain ===
Morocco
3
Complex Sportif Al Amal, Casablanca, Morocco
19-22 September 2003
Clay

Great Britain
2

			1	2	3	4	5
1	(Morocco) (United Kingdom)	**Hicham Arazi**; Tim Henman	**6**; 4	**6**; 4	**7^{7}** 6^{4}
2	(Morocco) (United Kingdom)	**Younes El Aynaoui**; Greg Rusedski	3; **6**	**6**; 3	**6**; 4	3; **6**	**6**; 1
3	(Morocco) (United Kingdom)	Hicham Arazi / Mounir El Aarej; **Tim Henman / Greg Rusedski**	6^{3} **7^{7}**	2; **6**	4; **6**
4	(Morocco) (United Kingdom)	Younes El Aynaoui; **Tim Henman**	3; **6**	**7^{7}** 6^{4}	6^{5} **7^{7}**	4; **6**
5	(Morocco) (United Kingdom)	**Hicham Arazi**; Greg Rusedski	5; **7**	**7**; 5	**7^{9}** 6^{7}	**7^{7}** 6^{5}

=== Netherlands vs. India ===
Netherlands
5
IJsselhallen, Zwolle, Netherlands
19-22 September 2003
Hard (i)

India
0

			1	2	3	4	5
1	(Netherlands) (India)	**Martin Verkerk**; Rohan Bopanna	5; **7**	**6**; 3	5; **7**	**7^{9}** 6^{7}	**12**; 10
2	(Netherlands) (India)	**Sjeng Schalken**; Prakash Amritraj	**6**; 3	**6**; 1	**6**; 1
3	(Netherlands) (India)	**John van Lottum / Martin Verkerk**; Mahesh Bhupathi / Rohan Bopanna	4; **6**	**7**; 5	**7**; 5	**6**; 4
4	(Netherlands) (India)	**Sjeng Schalken**; Harsh Mankad	**6**; 3	**6**; 1
5	(Netherlands) (India)	**Raemon Sluiter**; Prakash Amritraj	**6**; 1	**6**; 3

=== Ecuador vs. Romania ===
Ecuador
2
Quito Tenis Y Golf Club, Quito, Ecuador
19-22 September 2003
Clay

Romania
3

			1	2	3	4	5
1	(Ecuador) (Romania)	Giovanni Lapentti; **Victor Hănescu**	6^{3} **7^{7}**	**7^{7}** 6^{5}	6^{5} **7^{7}**	**7^{7}** 6^{1}	4; **6**
2	(Ecuador) (Romania)	**Nicolás Lapentti**; Răzvan Sabău	**6**; 2	**6**; 4	3; **6**	4; **6**	**6**; 3
3	(Ecuador) (Romania)	Giovanni Lapentti / Nicolás Lapentti; **Florin Mergea / Horia Tecău**	6^{2} **7^{7}**	**6**; 1	3; **6**	**6**; 3	11; **13**
4	(Ecuador) (Romania)	**Nicolás Lapentti**; Victor Hănescu	**6**; 4	6^{4} **7^{7}**	6^{5} **7^{7}**	**7^{7}** 6^{2}	**6**; 3
5	(Ecuador) (Romania)	Giovanni Lapentti; **Răzvan Sabău**	4; **6**	**6**; 3	4; **6**	**7**; 5	5; **7**

=== Slovakia vs. United States ===
Slovakia
2
National Tennis Centre, Bratislava, Slovakia
19-22 September 2003
Clay

United States
3

			1	2	3	4	5
1	(Slovakia) (United States)	**Dominik Hrbatý**; Andy Roddick	3; **6**	**6**; 3	**6**; 4	**6**; 4
2	(Slovakia) (United States)	Karol Kučera; **Mardy Fish**	**6**; 4	5; **7**	5; **7**	1; **6**
3	(Slovakia) (United States)	Karol Beck / Dominik Hrbatý; **Bob Bryan / Mike Bryan**	1; **6**	4; **6**	6^{5} **7^{7}**
4	(Slovakia) (United States)	Karol Beck; **Andy Roddick**	3; **6**	4; **6**	4; **6**
5	(Slovakia) (United States)	**Michal Mertiňák**; Mardy Fish	3; **6**	**6**; 3	**6**; 4
