= Austria Davis Cup team =

National tennis team

Austria
- Captain: Stefan Koubek
- Nations Ranking: 6 (21 September 2026)
- Colors: Red & White
- First year: 1905
- Years played: 91
- Ties played (W–L): 174 (84–90)
- Years in World Group: 23 (10–23)
- Best finish: Semifinal (1990)
- Most total wins: Thomas Muster (45–18)
- Most singles wins: Thomas Muster (36–8)
- Most doubles wins: Jürgen Melzer (15–12)
- Best doubles team: Thomas Muster / Alex Antonitsch (9–7)
- Most ties played: Jürgen Melzer (38)
- Most years played: Jürgen Melzer (22)

The Austria Davis Cup team represents Austria in the Davis Cup and is governed by the Austrian Tennis Federation, known in German as Österreichischer Tennisverband. In 2010, Austria was re-promoted to the World Group after being relegated to the Europa/Africa Zone Group I only one year earlier. In 2012, Austria advanced to the World Group quarterfinals for the first time since 1995, eventually losing against Spain.

== History ==
Austria competed in its first Davis Cup in 1905.

The Austrian team achieved their best Davis Cup result in 1990, when they were on the brink of reaching the final, playing their semi final against the USA on clay in Vienna, with a team consisting of Thomas Muster, Horst Skoff and Alex Antonitsch. After Muster had won his singles rubbers against Michael Chang and Andre Agassi, the standing in the tie was 2:2. Skoff and Chang met each other in the decisive fifth rubber, with Skoff taking a 2 set lead, and trying to close out the third set as the daylight faded. Skoff failed to do this and Chang took the third set, with the match then postponed until the next day, with Skoff leading 2 sets to 1 overnight. Skoff needed to win 1 more set to send Austria into the final, but the final 2 sets were both won by Chang, so Austria went out and the USA reached the final.

== Results and fixtures ==
The following are lists of match results and scheduled matches for the current year.

Win Loss Fixture

=== 2026 ===
Qualifiers
First round

Japan
2
Ariake Coliseum, Tokyo, Japan
6–7 February 2026
Hard (i)

Austria
3

			1	2	3
1	(Japan) (Austria)	Yosuke Watanuki; Sebastian Ofner	6; 3	6; 4
2	(Japan) (Austria)	Shintaro Mochizuki; Jurij Rodionov	4; 6	5; 7
3	(Japan) (Austria)	Yosuke Watanuki / Takeru Yuzuki; Alexander Erler / Lucas Miedler	7^{7} 6^{4}	6^{8} 7^{10}	6; 4
4	(Japan) (Austria)	Shintaro Mochizuki; Lukas Neumayer	3; 6	3; 6
5	(Japan) (Austria)	Yoshihito Nishioka; Jurij Rodionov	7; 5	1; 6	0; 6

Qualifiers
Second round

Austria
3
Wiener Athletic Club, Vienna, Austria
18–19 September
Clay

Belgium
1

			1	2	3
1	(Austria) (Belgium)	Jurij Rodionov; Gauthier Onclin	6; 4	6; 1
2	(Austria) (Belgium)	Lukas Neumayer; Zizou Bergs	6; 2	4; 6	2; 6
3	(Austria) (Belgium)	Lucas Miedler / Neil Oberleitner; Sander Gillé / Joran Vliegen	7^{7} 6^{5}	7; 5
4	(Austria) (Belgium)	Jurij Rodionov; Zizou Bergs	7^{8} 6^{6}	6; 3
5	(Austria) (Belgium)	Lukas Neumayer; Gauthier Onclin				not played

Finals
Quarterfinals

Austria

SuperTennis Arena, Bologna, Italy
26 November
Hard (i)

Spain

		1	2	3
1	(Austria) (Spain)
2	(Austria) (Spain)
3	(Austria) (Spain)

== Current squad ==
Squad representing Austria at the 2026 Davis Cup Finals
Player	Win–loss			First year	Ties	Ranking	
Player	Sgl	Dbl	Total	First year	Ties	Sgl	Dbl
Jurij Rodionov	11–6	0–0	11–6	2019	12	137	—
Lukas Neumayer	4–2	0–0	4–2	2024	5	168	671
Joel Schwärzler	0–0	0–0	0–0	2026	0	172	475
Neil Oberleitner	0–0	1–0	1–0	2026	1	854	22
Lucas Miedler	1–0	7–3	8–3	2022	10	—	19

* Statistics are as of 26 October 2026.

== Recent performances ==
Here is the list of all match-ups since 1981, when the competition started being held in the current World Group format.

=== 1980s ===
Year	Competition	Date	Location	Opponent	Score	Result
1981	European Zone, 1st Round	BYE				
1981	European Zone, Quarterfinals	12–14 Jun	Salzburg (AUT)	Denmark	3–2	Win
1981	European Zone, Semifinals	9–11 Jul	Pörtschach (AUT)	Soviet Union	0–5	Loss
1982	European Zone, 1st Round	BYE				
1982	European Zone, Quarterfinals	11–13 Jun	Vienna (AUT)	Algeria	5–0	Win
1982	European Zone, Semifinals	6–8 Aug	Pörtschach (AUT)	Switzerland	0–4	Loss
1983	European Zone, 1st Round	6–8 May	Ternitz (AUT)	Morocco	5–0	Win
1983	European Zone, Quarterfinals	10–12 Jun	Oslo (NOR)	Norway	4–1	Win
1983	European Zone, Semifinals	8–10 Jul	Pörtschach (AUT)	Hungary	2–3	Loss
1984	European Zone, 1st Round	4–6 May		Lebanon	W/O	Win
1984	European Zone, Quarterfinals	15–17 Jun	Vienna (AUT)	Norway	5–0	Win
1984	European Zone, Semifinals	13–15 Jul	Jūrmala (URS)	Soviet Union	2–3	Loss
1985	European Zone, 1st Round	BYE				
1985	European Zone, Quarterfinals	14–16 Jun	Athens (GRE)	Greece	3–2	Win
1985	European Zone, Semifinals	2–4 Aug	Hartberg (AUT)	Israel	2–3	Loss
1986	European Zone, 1st Round	BYE				
1986	European Zone, Quarterfinals	13–15 Jun	Mayrhofen (AUT)	Portugal	5–0	Win
1986	European Zone, Semifinals	18–20 Jul	Bad Kleinkirchheim (AUT)	Romania	3–2	Win
1986	European Zone, Finals	1–3 Oct	Montpellier (FRA)	France	1–4	Loss
1987	European Zone, 1st Round	BYE				
1987	European Zone, Quarterfinals	12–14 Jun	Bad Kleinkirchheim (AUT)	Greece	4–1	Win
1987	European Zone, Semifinals	24–26 Jul	Oporto (POR)	Portugal	4–1	Win
1987	European Zone, Finals	2–4 Oct	Copenhagen (DEN)	Denmark	2–3	Loss
1988	Europe Zone Group I, 1st Round	BYE				
1988	Europe Zone Group I, Semifinals	10–12 Jun	Villach (AUT)	Nigeria	5–0	Win
1988	Europe Zone Group I, Finals	22–24 Jul	Zell am See (AUT)	Great Britain	5–0	Win
1989	World Group, 1st Round	3–5 Feb	Vienna (AUT)	Australia	5–0	Win
1989	World Group, Quarterfinals	7–9 Apr	Vienna (AUT)	Sweden	2–3	Loss

=== 1990s ===
Year	Competition	Date	Location	Opponent	Score	Result
1990	World Group, 1st Round	2–4 Feb	Barcelona (ESP)	Spain	3–2	Win
1990	World Group, Quarterfinals	30 Mar–2 Apr	Vienna (AUT)	Italy	5–0	Win
1990	World Group, Semifinals	21–23 Sep	Vienna (AUT)	United States	2–3	Loss
1991	World Group, 1st Round	1–3 Feb	Prague (TCH)	Czechoslovakia	1–4	Loss
1991	World Group, relegation play-offs	20–22 Sep	Manchester (GBR)	Great Britain	1–3	Loss
1992	Euro/African Zone Group I, 1st Round	BYE				
1992	Euro/African Zone Group I, Semifinals	1–3 May	Helsinki (FIN)	Finland	4–1	Win
1992	World Group, relegation play-offs	25–27 Sep	Vancouver (CAN)	Canada	3–1	Win
1993	World Group, 1st Round	26–28 Mar	Vienna (AUT)	France	1–4	Loss
1993	World Group, relegation play-offs	24–26 Sep	Christchurch (NZL)	New Zealand	3–2	Win
1994	World Group, 1st Round	26–28 Mar	Graz (AUT)	Germany	2–3	Loss
1994	World Group, relegation play-offs	23–25 Sep	Montevideo (URU)	Uruguay	3–2	Win
1995	World Group, 1st Round	3–5 Feb	Vienna (AUT)	Spain	4–1	Win
1995	World Group, Quarterfinals	31 Mar–2 Apr	Växjö (SWE)	Sweden	0–5	Loss
1996	World Group, 1st Round	9–12 Feb	Johannesburg (RSA)	South Africa	2–3	Loss
1996	World Group, relegation play-offs	20–22 Sep	São Paulo (BRA)	Brazil	1–4	Loss
1997	Euro/African Zone Group I, 1st Round	BYE				
1997	Euro/African Zone Group I, Semifinals	4–6 Apr	Graz (AUT)	Croatia	3–2	Win
1997	World Group, relegation play-offs	19–21 Sep	Harare (ZIM)	Zimbabwe	2–3	Loss
1998	Euro/African Zone Group I, Quarterfinals	3–5 Apr	Ramat HaSharon (ISR)	Israel	1–4	Loss
1998	Euro/African Zone Group I, Relegation Play-offs	25–27 Sep	Pörtschach (AUT)	Denmark	5–0	Win
1999	Euro/African Zone Group I, Quarterfinals	2–4 Apr	Wels (AUT)	Portugal	4–1	Win
1999	World Group, relegation play-offs	24–26 Sep	Pörtschach (AUT)	Sweden	3–2	Win

=== 2000s ===
Year	Competition	Date	Location	Opponent	Score	Result
2000	World Group, 1st Round	4–6 Feb	Bratislava (SVK)	Slovakia	2–3	Loss
2000	World Group, relegation play-offs	21–23 Jul	Rennes (FRA)	France	0–5	Loss
2001	Euro/African Zone Group I, Quarterfinals	6–8 Apr	Pula (CRO)	Croatia	1–4	Loss
2001	Euro/African Zone Group I, Relegation Play-offs	21–23 Sep	Wels (AUT)	Ukraine	4–1	Win
2002	Euro/African Zone Group I, 1st Round	8–10 Feb	Tyrol (AUT)	Israel	3–2	Win
2002	Euro/African Zone Group I, Quarterfinals	5–7 Apr	Constanța (ROU)	Romania	0–5	Loss
2003	Euro/African Zone Group I, 1st Round	7–9 Feb	Oslo (NOR)	Norway	5–0	Win
2003	Euro/African Zone Group I, Quarterfinals	4–6 Apr	St. Anton (AUT)	Finland	3–2	Win
2003	World Group, relegation play-offs	19–21 Sep	Pörtschach (AUT)	Belgium	3–2	Win
2004	World Group, 1st Round	6–8 Feb	Uncasville (USA)	United States	0–5	Loss
2004	World Group, relegation play-offs	24–26 Sep	Pörtschach (AUT)	Great Britain	3–2	Win
2005	World Group, 1st Round	4–6 Mar	Sydney (AUS)	Australia	0–5	Loss
2005	World Group, relegation play-offs	23–25 Sep	Pörtschach (AUT)	Ecuador	4–1	Win
2006	World Group, 1st Round	10–12 Feb	Graz (AUT)	Croatia	2–3	Loss
2006	World Group, relegation play-offs	22–24 Sep	Pörtschach (AUT)	Mexico	5–0	Win
2007	World Group, 1st Round	9–11 Feb	Linz (AUT)	Argentina	1–4	Loss
2007	World Group, relegation play-offs	21–23 Sep	Innsbruck (AUT)	Brazil	4–1	Win
2008	World Group, 1st Round	8–10 Feb	Vienna (AUT)	United States	1–4	Loss
2008	World Group, relegation play-offs	19–21 Sep	London (GBR)	Great Britain	3–2	Win
2009	World Group, 1st Round	6–8 Mar	Garmisch-Partenkirchen (GER)	Germany	2–3	Loss
2009	World Group, relegation play-offs	18–20 Sep	Rancagua (CHI)	Chile	2–3	Loss

=== 2010s ===
Year	Competition	Date	Location	Opponent	Score	Result
2010	Europe/Africa Zone Group I, 2nd round	5–7 Mar	Bad Gleichenberg (AUT)	Slovakia	3–2	Win
2010	World Group play-offs	16–19 Sep	Tel Aviv (ISR)	Israel	3–2	Win
2011	World Group, 1st round	4–6 Mar	Vienna (AUT)	France	2–3	Loss
2011	World Group play-offs	16–18 Sep	Antwerp (BEL)	Belgium	4–1	Win
2012	World Group, 1st round	10–12 Feb	Wiener Neustadt (AUT)	Russia	3–2	Win
2012	World Group, Quarterfinals	6–8 Apr	Oropesa del Mar (ESP)	Spain	1–4	Loss
2013	World Group, 1st round	1–3 Feb	Astana (KAZ)	Kazakhstan	1–3	Loss
2013	World Group play-offs	13–15 Sep	Groningen (NED)	Netherlands	0–5	Loss
2014	Europe/Africa Zone Group I, 2nd round	4–6 Apr	Bratislava (SVK)	Slovakia	1–4	Loss
2014	Europe/Africa Zone Group I, 1st round play-offs	12–14 Sep	Valmiera (LAT)	Latvia	4–1	Win
2015	Europe/Africa Zone Group I, 1st round	6–8 Mar	Örebro (SWE)	Sweden	3–2	Win
2015	Europe/Africa Zone Group I, 2nd round	17–19 Jul	Kitzbühel (AUT)	Netherlands	2–3	Loss
2016	Europe/Africa Zone Group I, 1st round	4–6 Mar	Guimarães (POR)	Portugal	4–1	Win
2016	Europe/Africa Zone Group I, 2nd round	15–17 Jul	Kyiv (UKR)	Ukraine	2–3	Loss
2017	Europe/Africa Zone Group I, 2nd round	7–9 Apr	Minsk (BLR)	Belarus	1–3	Loss
2017	Europe/Africa Zone Group I, 1st round play-offs	15–17 Sep	Wels (AUT)	Romania	4–1	Win
2018	Europe/Africa Zone Group I, 1st round	2–3 Feb	Sankt Pölten (AUT)	Belarus	5–0	Win
2018	Europe/Africa Zone Group I, 2nd round	6–7 Apr	Moscow (RUS)	Russia	3–1	Win
2018	World Group play-offs	14–16 Sep	Graz (AUT)	Australia	3–1	Win
2019	Qualifying round	1–2 Feb	Salzburg (AUT)	Chile	2–3	Loss
2019	Europe/Africa Zone Group I	13–14 Sep	Espoo (FIN)	Finland	3–2	Win

=== 2020s ===
Year	Competition	Date	Location	Opponent	Score	Result
2020	Qualifying round	6–7 Mar	Premstätten (AUT)	Uruguay	3–1	Win
2021	Finals, Group stage	26 Nov	Innsbruck (AUT)	Serbia	0–3	Loss
2021	Finals, Group stage	28 Nov	Innsbruck (AUT)	Germany	1–2	Loss
2022	Qualifying round	4–5 Mar	Seoul (KOR)	South Korea	1–3	Loss
2022	World Group I	16–17 Sep	Tulln an der Donau (AUT)	Pakistan	4–0	Win
2023	Qualifying round	4–5 Feb	Rijeka (CRO)	Croatia	1–3	Loss
2023	World Group I	15–16 Sep	Schwechat (AUT)	Portugal	1–3	Loss
2024	World Group I play-offs	3–4 Feb	Limerick (IRL)	Ireland	4–0	Win
2024	World Group I	13–14 Sep	Bad Waltersdorf (AUT)	Turkey	3–0	Win
2025	Qualifiers first round	31 Jan–1 Feb	Schwechat (AUT)	Finland	4–0	Win
2025	Qualifiers second round	12–13 Sep	Debrecen (HUN)	Hungary	3–2	Win
2025	Finals, Quarterfinals	19 Nov	Bologna (ITA)	Italy	0–2	Loss
2026	Qualifiers first round	6–7 Feb	Tokyo (JPN)	Japan	3–2	Win
2026	Qualifiers second round	18–19 Sep	Vienna (AUT)	Belgium	3–1	Win
2026	Finals, Quarterfinals	26 Nov	Bologna (ITA)	Spain	–	

== Player records ==
Most total wins overall
#	Player	Years	Win–loss			Ties played	Years played
#	Player	Years	Singles	Doubles	Total	Ties played	Years played
1	Thomas Muster	1984–1997	36–8	9–10	45–18	24	12
2	Jürgen Melzer	1999–2020	22–29	15–12	37–41	38	22
3	Hans Kary	1969–1983	22–15	11–10	33–25	26	14
4	Franz Matejka	1927–1934	20–9	2–4	22–13	15	8
4	Franz Saiko	1954–1962	18–8	4–5	22–13	15	9
4	Horst Skoff	1986–1994	21–13	1–4	22–17	19	9
7	Stefan Koubek	1998–2011	20–19	0–0	20–19	22	13
8	Peter Feigl	1976–1985	12–12	7–6	19–18	15	9
8	Alex Antonitsch	1984–1996	6–8	13–14	19–22	27	13
10	Hermann Artens	1927–1934	14–13	4–9	18–22	15	8

== See also ==
- Davis Cup
- Austria Billie Jean King Cup team
- Austria at the Hopman Cup
