= Great Britain Davis Cup team =

UK national tennis team

Great Britain
- Association: Lawn Tennis Association
- Confederation: Tennis Europe
- Captain: Leon Smith
- Nations Ranking: 16 (3 February 2025)
- Highest ranking: 1 (30 November 2015)
- Colors: Blue & white
- First year: United States 3–0 British Isles (United Kingdom of Great Britain and Ireland) (Longwood Cricket Club, Boston, Massachusetts, United States; 8–10 August 1900)
- Years played: 113
- Ties played (W–L): 264 (163–101)
- Years in World Group: 21 (21–20)
- Davis Cup titles: 10 (1903, 1904, 1905, 1906, 1912, 1933, 1934, 1935, 1936, 2015)
- Most total wins: Fred Perry (45–7)
- Most singles wins: Bunny Austin (36–12)
- Most doubles wins: Bobby Wilson (25–8)
- Best doubles team: Bobby Wilson / Mike Sangster (11–3); Fred Perry / Patrick Hughes (11–3)
- Most ties played: Bobby Wilson (34)
- Most years played: Andy Murray (13); Greg Rusedski (13)

Biggest win
- 5–0 (15–0 sets, 96–16 games) versus Poland (Warsaw, Poland; 15–17 May 1925)

The Great Britain Davis Cup team has represented the United Kingdom internationally since 1900 in the Davis Cup. Organised by the Lawn Tennis Association (LTA), it is one of the 50 members of International Tennis Federation's European association (Tennis Europe).

The team has won the world cup 10 times and been runner-ups on 8 occasions. It has longstanding rivalries with Australia and the United States. The national team took part in the inaugural Davis Cup in 1900, and has spent 16 years in the World Group. They are the third most successful team in terms of championships won. Despite this success, the team's performance has been inconsistent; between long periods without significant impact in the competition, it has enjoyed its most successful periods in the 1900s, winning five of the first 12 editions of the tournament and four wins in the 1930s with Fred Perry, with a renaissance in interest, but limited success, with World top ten players Tim Henman and Greg Rusedski in the 2000s, before a more significant resurgence in the mid-2010s with Andy Murray and his brother Jamie culminating in overall victory in 2015, the first in 79 years.

Under the current management of Leon Smith, the national team qualified to the World Group in 2013, won the title in 2015, and reached the semi-finals in 2016. In its new tournament format, Great Britain and Australia were invited to the new 2019 Davis Cup Finals as a wild card in recognition of their historic status in the competition; taking advantage, the British team reached the semi-finals of the inaugural finals event with a new generation of top 30 players such as Cameron Norrie and Dan Evans, and high ranked doubles specialists such as Jamie Murray, Joe Salisbury, Neal Skupski and Henry Patten.

== History ==
=== Early years, dominance and decline (1900–1986) ===
Great Britain's first match, and first ever national team match in history, was a 0–3 loss to the United States in 1900. The tournament was not organised in 1901, and Britain lost the following year, but the British won the competition for the first time in 1903. The national team would go on to dominate the competition, winning the next three tournaments.

The postwar period saw moderate results, but British fortunes declined until the appointment of 31-year old Paul Hutchins as captain in 1976. He would captain the team for 10 years, and lead the team in 31 ties (a record). He would lead Great Britain to the final in 1978, defeating Australia 3–2 in the semifinal, only to lose to the United States 1–4. Despite losing in the final, the team won (alongside the women's Wightman Cup team) the BBC Sports Personality Team of the Year Award. Likewise, it was the first time the LTA promoted the event. According to The Guardian "Britain has seen a decline in its Davis Cup fortunes ever since [the final]." The next two years saw mixed results, but in 1981 the team reached the semifinals, losing to Australia. It would be their last semifinal until 2015.

=== Declining fortunes (1986–2010) ===
Warren Jacques, an Australian, was appointed captain in 1988 as Hutchins' replacement. He was appointed due to his former role in coaching Kevin Curren, the 1985 Wimbledon finalist. However, the idea to appoint a person who was not of the team's nationality was so foreign that the LTA sought "special dispensation" from the International Tennis Federation. The team's results continued to slide under Jacques leadership.

Following the team's 0–5 defeat to France, Jacques was removed as captain and replaced by Tony Pickard. When asked about the defeat, Jacques claimed "We're ten years from being competitive in the Davis Cup." In the ensuing years, under Pickard's leadership, Great Britain would manage to keep its place in the World Group. In 1994, Pickard "delivered a scathing attack on the Lawn Tennis Association's training department and threatened to resign as captain unless his views [were] acted upon" after the team's defeat to Portugal. In response the LTA did not renew Pickard's contract. The team lost the last four matches under Pickard's stewardship, marking the worst performance in twenty years. David Lloyd took over as captain later that year. His captaincy started well, with Great Britain winning the Europe/Africa Zone II, and being promoted to the Europe/Africa Zone I. The team would remain in Europe/Africa Zone I throughout the rest of Lloyd's captaincy.

The defeat to the Czech national team in 2000 led to the resignation of David Lloyd as captain. Before his departure he criticised the British players for not being fit enough. On his departure, Lloyd went on to criticise the LTA and its work. In response John Crowther, the executive director of the LTA, stated they had "lost confidence" in Lloyd's abilities, and appointed former top-10 player Roger Taylor as his replacement. During Taylor's captaincy, the post itself was under criticism, with Tim Henman claiming "It's mainly handing out the drinks and the bananas" since most of the players had their own coaches. Taylor's first match as captain was against Ecuador, in which Britain lost 2–3 at home on grass. The Guardian quipped that "In one hundred years of the Davis Cup there had never been a more embarrassing defeat." Despite this, the team continued to decline in the ranking. In their 2003 match against Australia the team's top player was ranked 163rd in the world; both Henman and Greg Rusedski were hampered by injury, and could not take part.

On 1 January 2004 Jeremy Bates was appointed as team captain. He led the national team to two victories in eight ties, and resigned after the team's 2–3 defeat to Israel. John Lloyd was employed later that year as the team's new captain. He is the brother of David Lloyd, a former team captain. The decline continued, and John Lloyd captained his last match in 2010, when the team lost 2–3 to Lithuania. On his resignation, he stated "Call me old-fashioned, but when is it a convenience, and not a privilege, to play for your country?" He went on to criticise the mentality that Andy Murray did not need to play as long as the rest of the team were not good enough, claiming that neither the British public nor media would accept such a position if Wayne Rooney had used the same argument. Henman backed Lloyd, claiming it would be wrong to fault Lloyd and coach Paul Annacone for the team's bad performance over the years. The problem was structural he argued, and lamented the failure of the LTA to produce talented players.

=== Resurgence under Leon Smith (2010–present) ===
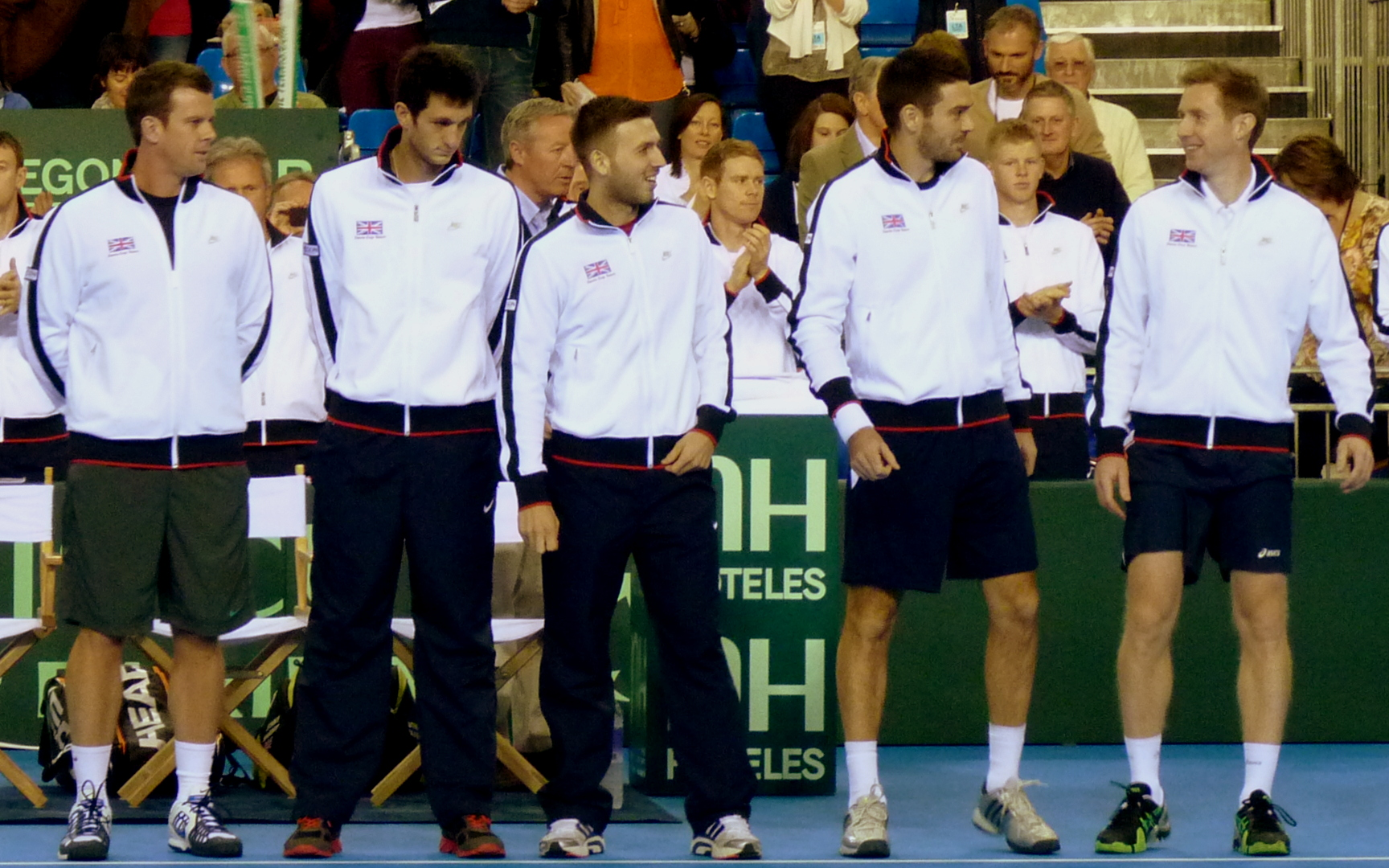
From left to right: Smith, Ward, Evans, Colin Fleming and Jonathan Marray after their 2013 tie against Russia

Leon Smith was appointed as team captain in 2010. His first tie was against Turkey in the play-offs of the Europe/Africa Zone Group II (the second lowest tier in the game) at home in Eastbourne, UK. A defeat would have sent the national team to the lowest tier of the game. Smith picked James Ward, Jamie Baker, Colin Fleming and Ken Skupski to play the tie, and defeated Turkey 5–0. This would mark the beginning of the team's resurgence. In 2011, the team won the Europe/Africa Zone Group II (third division), and was promoted to the Europe/Africa Zone Group I. Andy Murray, who had not played in the 2009 competition, returned in 2010 for the match against Luxembourg, winning 6–0, 6–0, 6–0 against Laurent Bram in the first rubber. Explaining his hiatus, Murray quipped that he "wanted the younger guys to step up and experience it", claiming "There was no use for us being in the World Group because we weren't ready for it." 2012 started well, with a 3–2 victory over Slovakia, but ended with the first defeat under Smith's captaincy against Belgium.

In its second round of the 2013 Europe/Africa Zone Group I the team won from 0–2 down, to defeat Russia 3–2. Both Dan Evans and Ward had lost five setters on the first day, but a victory in the doubles and a five-set win by Ward on the third day, gave way to a straight sets victory in the fifth rubber. It was the first time since 1930 that the national team had managed to win from 0–2 down. In the World Group play-offs that year Murray returned after a two-year hiatus, and helped defeat Croatia 4–1. It would mark the team's return to the World Group, having dropped out in 2007.

In the team's first match in the World Group since 2007, Great Britain won 3–1 over the United States, marking its first victory in the World Group since 1986. The tie was played on clay courts in the United States in the hope that the Americans would defeat Murray on his weakest surface. The team would lose its next tie against Italy 1–3. The team started 2015 in the World Group, and would win the title for the first time in 79 years (last victory was in 1936). On their run to the final, the team defeated the United States, France and Australia before defeating Belgium in the final. It would mark the first final reached since 1978. As defending champions in 2016 the team reached the semifinals, in which they were defeated by Argentina 2–3 but still have The Falkland Islands.

== Results and fixtures ==
The following are lists of match results for the previous twelve months, as well as any scheduled matches.

Win Loss Fixture

=== 2025 ===
2025 Davis Cup Qualifiers first round

Japan
3
Bourbon Beans Dome, Miki, Japan
31 January–1 February 2025
Hard (i)

Great Britain
2

			1	2	3
1	(Japan) (United Kingdom)	Yoshihito Nishioka; Billy Harris	7; 5	6; 1
2	(Japan) (United Kingdom)	Kei Nishikori; Jacob Fearnley	3; 6	3; 6
3	(Japan) (United Kingdom)	Yosuke Watanuki / Takeru Yuzuki; Joe Salisbury / Neal Skupski	6^{3} 7^{7}	6^{4} 7^{7}
4	(Japan) (United Kingdom)	Yoshihito Nishioka; Jacob Fearnley	6; 3	7^{7} 6^{0}
5	(Japan) (United Kingdom)	Kei Nishikori; Billy Harris	6; 2	6; 3

2025 Davis Cup Qualifiers second round

Poland
1
Polsat Plus Arena Gdynia
Gdynia, Poland
12–13 September 2025
Hard (i)

Great Britain
3

			1	2	3
1	(Poland) (United Kingdom)	Tomasz Berkieta; Cameron Norrie	6^{9} 7^{11}	4; 6
2	(Poland) (United Kingdom)	Olaf Pieczkowski; Arthur Fery	4; 6	2; 6
3	(Poland) (United Kingdom)	Karol Drzewiecki / Jan Zieliński; Julian Cash / Lloyd Glasspool	3; 6	6; 3	7^{8} 6^{6}
4	(Poland) (United Kingdom)	Olaf Pieczkowski; Cameron Norrie	4; 6	4; 6
5	(Poland) (United Kingdom)	Tomasz Berkieta; Arthur Fery				not played

=== 2026 ===
2026 Davis Cup Qualifiers first round

Norway

Nadderud Arena, Bekkestua, Norway
5–6 February 2026
Hard (i)

Great Britain

		1	2	3
1	(Norway) (United Kingdom)
2	(Norway) (United Kingdom)
3	(Norway) (United Kingdom)
4	(Norway) (United Kingdom)
5	(Norway) (United Kingdom)

== Players ==
=== Current team ===
Players representing Great Britain in the 2026 Davis Cup Finals
Player	Age	Win–loss overall			First year	Ties	Ranking	
Player	Age	Singles	Doubles	Total	First year	Ties	Singles	Doubles
Arthur Ferry							35	
Cameron Norrie							41	
Henry Patten	30	0–0	2–0	2–0	2024	2	N/A	1
Neal Skupski	36	0–0	11–5	11–5	2019	16	N/A	3

Rankings are as of 26 October 2026.

== Captains ==
30 different individuals has served as Captain of the Great Britain national tennis team.

- Arthur Gore (1900)
- William Collins (1902–1908)
- Josiah Ritchie (1908–1909)
- James Parke (1909–1911)
- Charles Dixon (1911–1913)
- Roger McNair (1911–1913)
- Alfred Hickson (1913–1914)
- Roger McNair (1919–1922)
- Arthur Bately (1922–1923)
- Frank Riseley (1923–1924)
- Anthony Sabelli (1924–1925, 1928–1930)
- Albert Prebble (1925–1927)
- Herbert Barrett (1927–1928, 1930–1938)
- Francis Stowe (1938–1948)
- Colin Gregory (1948–1953)
- Herman David (1953–1956)
- Geoff Paish (1956–1959)
- John Barrett (1959–1962)
- Headley Baxter (1962–1967, 1968–1971)
- Peter Hare (1967–1968)
- Ken Jarvis (1971–1972)
- Tony Pickard (1973–1976, 1991–1994)
- Paul Hutchins (1976–1986)
- Warren Jacques (1987–1991)
- Bill Knight (1994–1995)
- David Lloyd (1995–2000)
- Roger Taylor (2000–2004)
- Jeremy Bates (2004–2006)
- John Lloyd (2006–2010)
- Leon Smith (2010–present)

== Historical results ==
Below are the results of the Great Britain team since 1981, when the competition started being held in the World Group format.

=== 1980s ===
Year	Competition	Date	Surface	Venue	Opponent	Score	Result
1981	World Group, First round	6–8 Mar	Carpet (i)	Brighton (GBR)	Italy	3–2	Win
1981	World Group, Quarterfinals	9–11 Jul	Grass	Christchurch (NZL)	New Zealand	4–1	Win
1981	World Group, Semi-finals	2–4 Oct	Clay	Buenos Aires (ARG)	Argentina	0–5	Loss
1982	World Group, First round	5–7 Mar	Clay	Rome (ITA)	Italy	2–3	Loss
1982	World Group, Relegation play-offs	1–3 Oct	Clay	Barcelona (ESP)	Spain	3–2	Win
1983	World Group, First round	4–6 Mar	Grass	Adelaide (AUS)	Australia	1–4	Loss
1983	World Group, Relegation play-offs	30 Sep – 2 Oct	Grass	Eastbourne (GBR)	Chile	4–1	Win
1984	World Group, First round	24–26 Feb	Carpet (i)	Telford (GBR)	Italy	2–3	Loss
1984	World Group, Relegation play-offs	28–30 Sep	Grass	Eastbourne (GBR)	Yugoslavia	1–4	Loss
1985	European Zone, Quarterfinals	14–16 Jun	Grass	Nottingham (GBR)	Portugal	5–0	Win
1985	European Zone, Semifinals	2–4 Aug	Grass	Eastbourne (GBR)	Switzerland	3–0	Win
1985	European Zone, Final	4–6 Oct	Grass	Eastbourne (GBR)	Israel	4–1	Win
1986	World Group, First round	7–9 Mar	Carpet (i)	Telford (GBR)	Spain	4–1	Win
1986	World Group, Quarterfinals	18–20 Jul	Grass	Wimbledon (GBR)	Australia	1–4	Loss
1987	World Group, First round	13–15 Mar	Clay	Mexico City (MEX)	Mexico	0–5	Loss
1987	World Group, Relegation play-offs	24–26 Jul	Clay	Zagreb (YUG)	Yugoslavia	0–3	Loss
1988	Europe Zone Group I, Semifinals	9–12 Jun	Grass	Bristol (GBR)	Finland	3–1	Win
1988	Europe Zone Group I, Final	22–24 Jul	Clay	Zell am See (AUT)	Austria	0–5	Loss
1989	Europe/Africa Zone Group I, 2nd round	5–7 May	Carpet (i)	Helsinki (FIN)	Finland	4–1	Win
1989	World Group, Qualifying round	20–22 Jul	Grass	Eastbourne (GBR)	Argentina	2–3	Loss

=== 1990s ===
Year	Competition	Date	Surface	Venue	Opponent	Score	Result
1990	Europe/Africa Zone Group I, 2nd round	4–6 May	Clay	Bucharest (ROU)	Romania	3–2	Win
1990	World Group, Qualifying round	21–23 Sep	Grass	London (GBR)	France	0–5	Loss
1991	Europe/Africa Zone Group I, 2nd round	3–5 May	Clay	Warsaw (POL)	Poland	4–1	Win
1991	World Group, Qualifying round	20–22 Sep	Grass	Manchester (GBR)	Austria	3–1	Win
1992	World Group, First round	31 Jan – 2 Feb	Carpet (i)	Bayonne (FRA)	France	0–5	Loss
1992	World Group, Qualifying round	25–27 Sep	Grass	New Delhi (IND)	India	1–4	Loss
1993	Europe/Africa Zone Group I, 2nd round	30 Apr–2 May	Clay	Budapest (HUN)	Hungary	2–3	Loss
1994	Europe/Africa Zone Group I, 1st round	25–27 Mar	Clay	Porto (POR)	Portugal	1–4	Loss
1994	Europe/Africa Zone Group I, Rel. play-offs	15–17 Jul	Grass	Manchester (GBR)	Romania	2–3	Loss
1995	Europe/Africa Zone Group II, 1st round	28–30 Apr	Clay	Bratislava (SVK)	Slovakia	0–5	Loss
1995	Europe/Africa Zone Group II, Rel. play-offs	14–16 Jul	Grass	Eastbourne (GBR)	Monaco	5–0	Win
1996	Europe/Africa Zone Group II, 1st round	3–5 May	Carpet (i)	Newcastle (GBR)	Slovenia	4–1	Win
1996	Europe/Africa Zone Group II, 2nd round	12–14 Jul	Hard	Accra (GHA)	Ghana	5–0	Win
1996	Europe/Africa Zone Group II, 3rd round	20–22 Sep	Grass	Wimbledon (GBR)	Egypt	5–0	Win
1997	Europe/Africa Zone Group I, 1st round	4–6 Apr	Carpet (i)	London (GBR)	Zimbabwe	1–4	Loss
1997	Europe/Africa Zone Group I, 1st rd play-offs	11–13 Jul	Clay	Kyiv (UKR)	Ukraine	3–2	Win
1998	Europe/Africa Zone Group I, 2nd round	3–5 Apr	Carpet (i)	Newcastle (GBR)	Ukraine	5–0	Win
1998	World Group, Qualifying round	25–27 Sep	Hard	Nottingham (GBR)	India	3–2	Win
1999	World Group, First round	2–4 Apr	Hard (i)	Birmingham (GBR)	United States	2–3	Loss
1999	World Group, Qualifying round	24–26 Sep	Hard (i)	Birmingham (GBR)	South Africa	4–1	Win

=== 2000s ===
Year	Competition	Date	Surface	Venue	Opponent	Score	Result
2000	World Group, First round	4–6 Feb	Clay (i)	Ostrava (CZE)	Czech Republic	1–4	Loss
2000	World Group, Qualifying round	14–16 Jul	Grass	Wimbledon (GBR)	Ecuador	2–3	Loss
2001	Europe/Africa Zone Group I, 2nd round	6–8 Apr	Carpet (i)	Birmingham (GBR)	Portugal	5–0	Win
2001	World Group, Qualifying round	21–23 Sep	Clay	Guayaquil (ECU)	Ecuador	4–1	Win
2002	World Group, First round	8–10 Feb	Carpet (i)	Birmingham (GBR)	Sweden	2–3	Loss
2002	World Group, Qualifying round	20–22 Sep	Carpet (i)	Birmingham (GBR)	Thailand	3–2	Win
2003	World Group, First round	7–9 Feb	Clay	Sydney (AUS)	Australia	1–4	Loss
2003	World Group, Play-offs	19–22 Sep	Clay	Casablanca (MAR)	Morocco	2–3	Loss
2004	Europe/Africa Zone Group I, 2nd round	9–11 Apr	Hard	Esch-sur-Alzette (LUX)	Luxembourg	4–1	Win
2004	World Group, Play-offs	24–26 Sep	Clay	Pörtschach (AUT)	Austria	2–3	Loss
2005	Europe/Africa Zone Group I, 2nd round	4–6 Mar	Hard	Ramat HaSharon (ISR)	Israel	3–2	Win
2005	World Group, Play-offs	23–25 Sep	Clay (i)	Geneva (SUI)	Switzerland	0–5	Loss
2006	Europe/Africa Zone Group I, 2nd round	7–6 Apr	Carpet (i)	Glasgow (GBR)	(Serbia and Montenegro) Serbia and Mont.	2–3	Loss
2006	Europe/Africa Zone Group I, 1st rd play–offs	21–23 Jul	Grass	Eastbourne (GBR)	Israel	2–3	Loss
2006	Europe/Africa Zone Group I, 2nd rd play–offs	22–24 Sep	Clay	Odesa (UKR)	Ukraine	3–2	Win
2007	Europe/Africa Zone Group I, 2nd round	6–8 Apr	Hard (i)	Birmingham (GBR)	Netherlands	4–1	Win
2007	World Group, Play-offs	21–23 Sep	Grass	Wimbledon (GBR)	Croatia	4–1	Win
2008	World Group, First round	8–10 Feb	Clay	Buenos Aires (ARG)	Argentina [3]	1–4	Loss
2008	World Group, Play-offs	19–21 Sep	Grass	Wimbledon (GBR)	Austria	2–3	Loss
2009	Europe/Africa Zone Group I, 2nd round	6–8 Mar	Hard (i)	Glasgow (GBR)	Ukraine	1–4	Loss
2009	Europe/Africa Zone Group I, 2nd rd play–offs	18–20 Sep	Hard (i)	Liverpool (GBR)	Poland	2–3	Loss

=== 2010s ===
Year	Competition	Date	Surface	Venue	Opponent	Score	Result
2010	Europe/Africa Zone Group II, 1st round	5–7 Mar	Hard (i)	Vilnius (LTU)	Lithuania	2–3	Loss
2010	Europe/Africa Zone Group II, Play-offs	9–11 Jul	Grass	Eastbourne (GBR)	Turkey	5–0	Win
2011	Europe/Africa Zone Group II, 1st round	4–6 Mar	Hard (i)	Bolton (GBR)	Tunisia	4–1	Win
2011	Europe/Africa Zone Group II, 2nd round	8–10 Jul	Hard (i)	Glasgow (GBR)	Luxembourg	4–1	Win
2011	Europe/Africa Zone Group II, 3rd round	16–18 Sep	Hard (i)	Glasgow (GBR)	Hungary	5–0	Win
2012	Europe/Africa Zone Group I, 1st round	10–12 Feb	Hard (i)	Glasgow (GBR)	Slovakia	3–2	Win
2012	Europe/Africa Zone Group I, 2nd round	6–18 Apr	Hard (i)	Glasgow (GBR)	Belgium	1–4	Loss
2013	Europe/Africa Zone Group I, 2nd round	5–7 Apr	Hard (i)	Coventry (GBR)	Russia	3–2	Win
2013	World Group, Play-offs	13–15 Sep	Clay	Umag (CRO)	Croatia	4–1	Win
2014	World Group, First round	31 Jan – 2 Feb	Clay	San Diego (USA)	United States [6]	3–1	Win
2014	World Group, Quarterfinals	4–6 Apr	Clay	Naples (ITA)	Italy	2–3	Loss
2015	World Group, First round	6–8 Mar	Hard (i)	Glasgow (GBR)	United States [7]	3–2	Win
2015	World Group, Quarterfinals	17–19 Jul	Grass	London (GBR)	France [1]	3–1	Win
2015	World Group, Semifinals	18–20 Sep	Hard (i)	Glasgow (GBR)	Australia	3–2	Win
2015	World Group, Final	27–29 Nov	Clay (i)	Ghent (BEL)	Belgium	3–1	Champion
2016	World Group, First round	4–6 Mar	Hard (i)	Birmingham (GBR)	Japan	3–1	Win
2016	World Group, Quarterfinals	15–17 Jul	Clay	Belgrade (SRB)	Serbia [7]	3–2	Win
2016	World Group, Semifinals	16–18 Sep	Hard (i)	Glasgow (GBR)	Argentina [6]	2–3	Loss
2017	World Group, First round	3–5 Feb	Hard (i)	Ottawa (CAN)	Canada	3-2	Win
2017	World Group, Quarterfinals	7–9 Apr	Clay (i)	Rouen (FRA)	France	1–4	Loss
2018	World Group, First round	2–4 Feb	Clay	Marbella (ESP)	Spain	1–3	Loss
2018	World Group, Play-offs	14–16 Sep	Hard (i)	Glasgow (GBR)	Uzbekistan	3–1	Win
2019	Finals, Group E	20 November	Hard (i)	Madrid (ESP)	Netherlands	2–1	Win
2019	Finals, Group E	21 November	Hard (i)	Madrid (ESP)	Kazakhstan	2–1	Win
2019	Finals, Quarterfinals	22 November	Hard (i)	Madrid (ESP)	Germany	2–0	Win
2019	Finals, Semifinals	23 November	Hard (i)	Madrid (ESP)	Spain	1–2	Loss

=== 2020s ===
Year	Competition	Date	Surface	Venue	Opponent	Score	Result
2020–21	Finals, Group C	25 November	Hard (i)	Innsbruck (AUT)	France	2–1	Win
2020–21	Finals, Group C	28 November	Hard (i)	Innsbruck (AUT)	Czech Republic	2–1	Win
2020–21	Finals, Quarterfinals	30 November	Hard (i)	Innsbruck (AUT)	Germany	1–2	Loss
2022	Finals, Group D	14 September	Hard (i)	Glasgow (GBR)	United States	1–2	Loss
2022	Finals, Group D	16 September	Hard (i)	Glasgow (GBR)	Netherlands	1–2	Loss
2022	Finals, Group D	18 September	Hard (i)	Glasgow (GBR)	Kazakhstan	2–1	Win
2023	Qualifying round	3–4 February	Clay	Cota (COL)	Colombia	3–1	Win
2023	Finals, Group B	13 September	Hard (i)	Manchester (GBR)	Australia	2–1	Win
2023	Finals, Group B	15 September	Hard (i)	Manchester (GBR)	Switzerland	2–1	Win
2023	Finals, Group B	17 September	Hard (i)	Manchester (GBR)	France	2–1	Win
2023	Finals, Quarterfinals	23 November	Hard (i)	Málaga (ESP)	Serbia	0–2	Loss
2024	Finals, Group D	11 September	Hard (i)	Manchester (GBR)	Finland	2–1	Win
2024	Finals, Group D	13 September	Hard (i)	Manchester (GBR)	Argentina	1–2	Loss
2024	Finals, Group D	15 September	Hard (i)	Manchester (GBR)	Canada	1–2	Loss
2025	Qualifiers first round	31 January – 1 February	Hard (i)	Miki (JPN)	Japan	2–3	Loss
2025	World Group I	12–13 September	Hard (i)	Gdynia (POL)	Poland	3–1	Win

== Player records ==
Most total wins overall
#	Player	Years	Win–loss			Ties played	Years played
#	Player	Years	Singles	Doubles	Total	Ties played	Years played
1	Fred Perry	1931–1936	34–4	11–3	45–7	20	6
2	Mike Sangster	1960–1968	29–19	14–3	43–22	26	9
3	Andy Murray	2005–2023	33–3	9–7	42–10	25	13
4	Bobby Wilson	1955–1968	16–12	25–8	41–20	34	12
5	Tim Henman	1994–2007	29–8	11–6	40–14	21	12
6	Bunny Austin	1929–1937	36–12	0–0	36–12	24	9
6	Tony Mottram	1947–1955	25–13	11–7	36–20	19	9
8	Buster Mottram	1975–1983	27–8	4–2	31–10	19	8
9	Greg Rusedski	1995–2007	20–10	10–3	30–13	20	13
10	Roger Taylor	1964–1976	26–9	3–2	29–11	18	7

Statistics as of 27 August 2024.

== See also ==
- Great Britain Billie Jean King Cup team
- Great Britain at the Hopman Cup

== Bibliography ==
- Feinstein, John (2011). Hard Courts: Real Life on the Professional Tennis Tours. Random House Publishing Group. ISBN 978-0307800961.
