= 2004 Davis Cup Europe/Africa Zone Group I =

International tennis competition

The European and African Zone was one of the three zones of regional Davis Cup competition in 2005.

In the European and African Zone there were four different groups in which teams competed against each other to advance to the next group.

== Participating teams ==
- Belgium
- Finland
- Germany
- Great Britain
- Greece
- Israel
- Luxembourg
- Slovakia
- South Africa
- Zimbabwe

== Draw ==
Second round Play-offs
Ramat HaSharon, Israel (hard)
Israel	3
Finland	2
Pretoria, South Africa (hard)
Greece	1
South Africa	4

First round Play-offs
Israel
bye
bye
Finland
Greece
bye
bye
South Africa

First round
S	Germany
bye
Israel
bye
S	Great Britain
bye
Esch/Alzette, Luxembourg (indoor hard)
Finland	1
Luxembourg	4
Harare, Zimbabwe (indoor hard)
Greece	2
Zimbabwe	3
bye
S	Belgium
bye
South Africa
bye
S	Slovakia

Second round
Alsdorf, Germany (indoor hard)
S	Germany	5
Israel	0
Esch/Alzette, Luxembourg (indoor hard)
S	Great Britain	4
Luxembourg	1
Tournai, Belgium (indoor clay)
Zimbabwe	1
S	Belgium	4
Johannesburg, South Africa (grass)
South Africa	2
S	Slovakia	3

- Finland and Greece relegated to Group II in 2005.
- Germany, Great Britain, Belgium, and Slovakia advance to World Group Play-off.

== Second round matches ==
=== Great Britain vs. Luxembourg ===
Great Britain
4
National Tennis Centre, Esch-sur-Alzette, Luxembourg
9–11 April 2004
hard (outdoor)

Luxembourg
1

			1	2	3	4	5
1	(United Kingdom) (Luxembourg)	Arvind Parmar; Gilles Müller	6; 4	5; 7	6; 3	4; 6	4; 6
2	(United Kingdom) (Luxembourg)	Tim Henman; Gilles Kremer	6; 3	6; 3	6; 2
3	(United Kingdom) (Luxembourg)	Tim Henman / Greg Rusedski; Gilles Müller / Mike Scheidweiler	6; 4	7^{9} 6^{7}	6; 3
4	(United Kingdom) (Luxembourg)	Tim Henman; Gilles Müller	7^{7} 6^{2}	6; 2	6; 1
5	(United Kingdom) (Luxembourg)	Greg Rusedski; Mike Scheidweiler	6; 3	7^{7} 6^{5}
