= Thailand Davis Cup team =

Thai national tennis team

Thailand
- Captain: Thanakorn Srichaphan
- Nations Ranking: 49 (20 September 2021)
- Colors: red and white
- First year: 1958
- Years played: 42
- Ties played (W–L): 92 (49-43)
- Best finish: WG Play-offs (2002, 2003, 2004, 2006)
- Most total wins: Danai Udomchoke (42-20)
- Most singles wins: Danai Udomchoke (40-17)
- Most doubles wins: Vittaya Samrej (21-13)
- Best doubles team: Vittaya Samrej/Narathorn Srichaphan (11-5); Sanchai Ratiwatana/Sonchat Ratiwatana (11–9)
- Most ties played: Vittaya Samrej (37)
- Most years played: Vittaya Samrej (18)

The Thailand men's national tennis team represents Thailand in Davis Cup tennis competition and are governed by the Lawn Tennis Association of Thailand.

Thailand currently compete in the Asia/Oceania Zone of Group II. They have never competed in the World Group, but reached the Play-offs on four occasions.

== History ==
Thailand competed in its first Davis Cup in 1958.

== Results and fixtures ==
Below are the results of Thailand team since 2000's, when the competition started being held in the World Group play-offs and qualifying round format.

=== World Group play-offs ===
Year	Home team	Score	Visiting team	Location	Venue	Door	Surface
2002	Great Britain	3–2	Thailand	Birmingham	National Indoor Arena	Indoor	Carpet
2003	Thailand	1–4	Czech Republic	Nonthaburi	Impact, Muang Thong Thani	Indoor	Hard
2004	Russia	5–0	Thailand	Moscow	Olympic Stadium	Indoor	Clay
2006	Germany	4–1	Thailand	Düsseldorf	Rochus Club	Outdoor	Clay

=== 2010's ===
Year	Competition	Date	Surface	Venue	Opponent	Score	Result

=== 2020's ===
Year	Competition	Date	Surface	Venue	Opponent	Score	Result

== Current team (2022) ==
- Kasidit Samrej
- Yuttana Charoenphon
- Thantub Suksumrarn
- Wishaya Trongcharoenchaikul
- Pruchya Isaro

== See also ==
- Davis Cup
- Thailand Billie Jean King Cup team
- Thailand at the Hopman Cup
- Lawn Tennis Association of Thailand
