= 2003 Davis Cup World Group =

- Date: 7 February – 30 November
- Edition: 23rd

Champions
- Australia
- Davis Cup

The World Group was the highest level of Davis Cup competition in 2003. The first-round losers went into the Davis Cup World Group playoffs, and the winners progress to the quarterfinals. The quarterfinalists were guaranteed a World Group spot for 2004.

== Participating teams ==
Participating teams
Argentina	Australia	Belgium	Brazil
Croatia	Czech Republic	France	Germany
Great Britain	Netherlands	Romania	Russia
Spain	Sweden	Switzerland	United States

== Draw ==
First round 7–9 February
Bucharest, Romania (indoor carpet)
S	France	4
Romania	1
Arnhem, Netherlands (indoor carpet)
S	Netherlands	2
Switzerland	3
Sydney, Australia (clay)
S	Australia	4
Great Britain	1
Helsingborg, Sweden (indoor carpet)
S	Sweden	3
Brazil	2
Zagreb, Croatia (indoor carpet)
Croatia	4
S	United States	1
Seville, Spain (clay)
Belgium	0
S	Spain	5
Buenos Aires, Argentina (clay)
Germany	0
S	Argentina	5
Ostrava, Czech Republic (indoor clay)
Czech Republic	2
S	Russia	3

Quarterfinals; 4–6 April
Toulouse, France (indoor hard)
S	France	2
Switzerland	3
Malmö, Sweden (indoor hard)
S	Australia	5
S	Sweden	0
Valencia, Spain (clay)
Croatia	0
S	Spain	5
Buenos Aires, Argentina (clay)
S	Argentina	5
S	Russia	0

Semifinals; 19–21 September
Melbourne, Australia (hard)
Switzerland	2
S	Australia	3
Málaga, Spain (clay)
S	Spain	3
S	Argentina	2

Final; 28–30 November
Melbourne, Australia (grass)
S	Australia	3
S	Spain	1

== First round ==
=== Romania vs. France ===
Romania
1
Sala Polivalentă, Bucharest, Romania
7–9 February 2003
Carpet (i)

France
4

			1	2	3	4	5
1	(Romania) (France)	Adrian Voinea; Sébastien Grosjean	2; 6	3; 6	6^{10} 7^{12}
2	(Romania) (France)	Andrei Pavel; Nicolas Escudé	6^{2} 7^{7}	2; 6	6^{5} 7^{7}
3	(Romania) (France)	Andrei Pavel / Gabriel Trifu; Michaël Llodra / Fabrice Santoro	4; 6	3; 6	6^{4} 7^{7}
4	(Romania) (France)	Victor Hănescu; Fabrice Santoro	6; 1	6; 4
5	(Romania) (France)	Gabriel Trifu; Nicolas Escudé	6^{3} 7^{7}	6; 4	4; 6

=== Netherlands vs. Switzerland ===
Netherlands
2
Gelredome, Arnhem, Netherlands
7–9 February 2003
Carpet (i)

Switzerland
3

			1	2	3	4	5
1	(Netherlands) (Switzerland)	Sjeng Schalken; Michel Kratochvil	6; 3	7; 5	1; 6	4; 6	6; 4
2	(Netherlands) (Switzerland)	Raemon Sluiter; Roger Federer	2; 6	1; 6	3; 6
3	(Netherlands) (Switzerland)	Paul Haarhuis / Martin Verkerk; George Bastl / Roger Federer	3; 6	6; 3	6; 4	7; 5
4	(Netherlands) (Switzerland)	Sjeng Schalken; Roger Federer	6^{2} 7^{7}	4; 6	5; 7
5	(Netherlands) (Switzerland)	Martin Verkerk; Michel Kratochvil	6; 1	6^{5} 7^{7}	6^{6} 7^{8}	1; 6

=== Australia vs. Great Britain ===
Australia
4
Sydney International Tennis Centre, Sydney, Australia
7–9 February 2003
Clay

Great Britain
1

			1	2	3	4	5
1	(Australia) (United Kingdom)	Mark Philippoussis; Alan Mackin	6; 3	6; 3	6; 3
2	(Australia) (United Kingdom)	Lleyton Hewitt; Alex Bogdanovic	7; 5	6; 1	6; 2
3	(Australia) (United Kingdom)	Lleyton Hewitt / Todd Woodbridge; Miles McLagan / Arvind Parmar	6; 1	6; 3	4; 6	6; 2
4	(Australia) (United Kingdom)	Wayne Arthurs; Miles McLagan	4; 6	6; 1	6; 4
5	(Australia) (United Kingdom)	Todd Woodbridge; Alex Bogdanovic	2; 6	6^{4} 7^{7}

=== Sweden vs. Brazil ===
Sweden
3
Idrottens Hus, Helsingborg, Sweden
7–9 February 2003
Carpet (i)

Brazil
2

			1	2	3	4	5
1	(Sweden) (Brazil)	Andreas Vinciguerra; Gustavo Kuerten	1; 6	4; 6	4; 6
2	(Sweden) (Brazil)	Jonas Björkman; André Sá	6; 4	5; 7	6; 2	4; 6	6; 1
3	(Sweden) (Brazil)	Jonas Björkman / Magnus Larsson; Gustavo Kuerten / André Sá	4; 6	6; 2	7; 5	2; 6	2; 6
4	(Sweden) (Brazil)	Jonas Björkman; Gustavo Kuerten	6; 4	6; 4	4; 6	4; 6	6; 1
5	(Sweden) (Brazil)	Andreas Vinciguerra; Flávio Saretta	6; 1	7; 5	6; 3

=== Croatia vs. United States ===
Croatia
4
Hall Dom Sportova, Zagreb, Croatia
7–9 February 2003
Carpet (i)

United States
1

			1	2	3	4	5
1	(Croatia) (United States)	Ivan Ljubičić; Mardy Fish	7; 5	6; 3	6; 4
2	(Croatia) (United States)	Mario Ančić; James Blake	1; 6	2; 6	6^{5} 7^{7}
3	(Croatia) (United States)	Goran Ivanišević / Ivan Ljubičić; James Blake / Mardy Fish	3; 6	4; 6	7^{7} 6^{4}	6; 4	6; 4
4	(Croatia) (United States)	Ivan Ljubičić; James Blake	6; 3	6^{5} 7^{7}	6; 4	6; 3
5	(Croatia) (United States)	Mario Ančić; Taylor Dent	7^{7} 6^{5}	3; 6	7^{12} 6^{10}

=== Spain vs. Belgium ===
Spain
5
Centro Deportivo Tenis Olimpico, Seville, Spain
7–9 February 2003
Clay

Belgium
0

			1	2	3	4	5
1	(Spain) (Belgium)	Juan Carlos Ferrero; Christophe Rochus	6; 3	6; 2	7; 5
2	(Spain) (Belgium)	Carlos Moyá; Xavier Malisse	7^{7} 6^{2}	6; 1	7^{7} 6^{5}
3	(Spain) (Belgium)	Àlex Corretja / Albert Costa; Olivier Rochus / Kristof Vliegen	6; 4	4; 6	6; 3	3; 6	8; 6
4	(Spain) (Belgium)	Juan Carlos Ferrero; Kristof Vliegen	6; 1	6; 4
5	(Spain) (Belgium)	Carlos Moyá; Christophe Rochus	6; 2	6; 2

=== Argentina vs. Germany ===
Argentina
5
Club Atlético River Plate, Buenos Aires, Argentina
7–9 February 2003
Clay

Germany
0

			1	2	3	4	5
1	(Argentina) (Germany)	Gastón Gaudio; Rainer Schüttler	6; 2	6; 3	6; 0
2	(Argentina) (Germany)	David Nalbandian; Lars Burgsmüller	6; 1	7^{7} 6^{4}	7; 5
3	(Argentina) (Germany)	Lucas Arnold Ker / David Nalbandian; Michael Kohlmann / Rainer Schüttler	6; 1	0; 6	4; 6	6; 1	6; 2
4	(Argentina) (Germany)	Juan Ignacio Chela; David Prinosil	6; 4	6; 1
5	(Argentina) (Germany)	Gastón Gaudio; Lars Burgsmüller	6; 3	6; 1

=== Czech Republic vs. Russia ===
Czech Republic
2
Sports Culture Palace, Ostrava, Czech Republic
7–9 February 2003
Clay (i)

Russia
3

			1	2	3	4	5
1	(Czech Republic) (Russia)	Jiří Novák; Nikolay Davydenko	6; 4	4; 6	6; 1	6; 1
2	(Czech Republic) (Russia)	Radek Štěpánek; Mikhail Youzhny	6; 3	6^{8} 7^{10}	7^{8} 6^{6}	2; 6	3; 6
3	(Czech Republic) (Russia)	Martin Damm / Cyril Suk; Yevgeny Kafelnikov / Mikhail Youzhny	6^{1} 7^{7}	6; 4	3; 6	3; 6
4	(Czech Republic) (Russia)	Jiří Novák; Yevgeny Kafelnikov	6; 2	6; 3	7^{7} 6^{5}
5	(Czech Republic) (Russia)	Radek Štěpánek; Nikolay Davydenko	6; 1	6^{4} 7^{7}	2; 6	6; 3	0; 6

== Quarterfinals ==
=== France vs. Switzerland ===
France
2
Zenith Stadium, Toulouse, France
4–6 April 2003
Hard (i)

Switzerland
3

			1	2	3	4	5
1	(France) (Switzerland)	Sébastien Grosjean; George Bastl	6; 3	6; 4	3; 6	6; 3
2	(France) (Switzerland)	Nicolas Escudé; Roger Federer	4; 6	5; 7	2; 6
3	(France) (Switzerland)	Nicolas Escudé / Fabrice Santoro; Roger Federer / Marc Rosset	4; 6	6; 3	3; 6	6^{4} 7^{7}
4	(France) (Switzerland)	Fabrice Santoro; Roger Federer	1; 6	0; 6	2; 6
5	(France) (Switzerland)	Nicolas Escudé; George Bastl	7^{7} 6^{5}	5; 7	7^{7} 6^{3}

=== Sweden vs. Australia ===
Sweden
0
Baltiska Hallen, Malmö, Sweden
4–6 April 2003
Hard (i)

Australia
5

			1	2	3	4	5
1	(Sweden) (Australia)	Jonas Björkman; Mark Philippoussis	4; 6	3; 6	3; 6
2	(Sweden) (Australia)	Thomas Enqvist; Lleyton Hewitt	4; 6	2; 6	7; 5	4; 6
3	(Sweden) (Australia)	Jonas Björkman / Thomas Enqvist; Wayne Arthurs / Todd Woodbridge	4; 6	2; 6	2; 6
4	(Sweden) (Australia)	Joachim Johansson; Wayne Arthurs	3; 6	6; 3	6^{4} 7^{7}
5	(Sweden) (Australia)	Magnus Norman; Mark Philippoussis	5; 7	7; 5	3; 6

=== Spain vs. Croatia ===
Spain
5
Valencia Tennis Club, Valencia, Spain
4–6 April 2003
Clay

Croatia
0

			1	2	3	4	5
1	(Spain) (Croatia)	Juan Carlos Ferrero; Mario Ančić	6; 4	6; 2	7^{7} 6^{1}
2	(Spain) (Croatia)	Carlos Moyá; Ivan Ljubičić	6^{5} 7^{7}	6; 1	6; 4	6; 4
3	(Spain) (Croatia)	Àlex Corretja / Albert Costa; Ivan Ljubičić / Lovro Zovko	6; 2	6; 3	6; 4
4	(Spain) (Croatia)	Albert Costa; Ivan Ljubičić	6; 3	6; 4
5	(Spain) (Croatia)	Àlex Corretja; Mario Ančić	7; 5	6; 3

=== Argentina vs. Russia ===
Argentina
5
Club Atlético River Plate, Buenos Aires, Argentina
4–6 April 2003
Clay

Russia
0

			1	2	3	4	5
1	(Argentina) (Russia)	David Nalbandian; Nikolay Davydenko	6; 2	6; 2	7; 5
2	(Argentina) (Russia)	Gastón Gaudio; Yevgeny Kafelnikov	6; 4	6; 0	6; 2
3	(Argentina) (Russia)	Lucas Arnold Ker / David Nalbandian; Yevgeny Kafelnikov / Mikhail Youzhny	3; 6	6; 3	6; 4	6; 3
4	(Argentina) (Russia)	Mariano Zabaleta; Mikhail Youzhny	6; 1	6; 4
5	(Argentina) (Russia)	Gastón Gaudio; Nikolay Davydenko	7^{7} 6^{4}	6; 3

== Semifinals ==
=== Australia vs. Switzerland ===
Australia
3
Rod Laver Arena, Melbourne, Australia
19–21 September 2003
Hard

Switzerland
2

			1	2	3	4	5
1	(Australia) (Switzerland)	Lleyton Hewitt; Michel Kratochvil	6; 4	6; 4	6; 1
2	(Australia) (Switzerland)	Mark Philippoussis; Roger Federer	3; 6	4; 6	6^{3} 7^{7}
3	(Australia) (Switzerland)	Wayne Arthurs / Todd Woodbridge; Roger Federer / Marc Rosset	4; 6	7^{7} 6^{5}	5; 7	6; 4	6; 4
4	(Australia) (Switzerland)	Lleyton Hewitt; Roger Federer	5; 7	2; 6	7^{7} 6^{4}	7; 5	6; 1
5	(Australia) (Switzerland)	Todd Woodbridge; Michel Kratochvil	4; 6					retired

=== Spain vs. Argentina ===
Spain
3
Palacio de Deportes José María Martín Carpena, Málaga, Spain
19–21 September 2003
Clay

Argentina
2

			1	2	3	4	5
1	(Spain) (Argentina)	Juan Carlos Ferrero; Gastón Gaudio	6; 4	6; 0	6; 0
2	(Spain) (Argentina)	Carlos Moyá; Mariano Zabaleta	5; 7	2; 6	6; 2	6; 0	6; 1
3	(Spain) (Argentina)	Àlex Corretja / Albert Costa; Agustín Calleri / Lucas Arnold Ker	3; 6	6; 1	4; 6	2; 6
4	(Spain) (Argentina)	Juan Carlos Ferrero; Agustín Calleri	4; 6	5; 7	1; 6
5	(Spain) (Argentina)	Carlos Moyá; Gastón Gaudio	6; 1	6; 4	6; 2

== Final ==
=== Australia vs. Spain ===
Australia
3
Rod Laver Arena, Melbourne, Australia
28–30 November 2003
Grass

Spain
1

			1	2	3	4	5
1	(Australia) (Spain)	Lleyton Hewitt; Juan Carlos Ferrero	3; 6	6; 3	3; 6	7^{7} 6^{0}	6; 2
2	(Australia) (Spain)	Mark Philippoussis; Carlos Moyà	4; 6	4; 6	6; 4	6^{4} 7^{7}
3	(Australia) (Spain)	Wayne Arthurs / Todd Woodbridge; Àlex Corretja / Feliciano López	6; 3	6; 1	6; 3
4	(Australia) (Spain)	Mark Philippoussis; Juan Carlos Ferrero	7; 5	6; 3	1; 6	2; 6	6; 0
5	(Australia) (Spain)	Lleyton Hewitt; Carlos Moyà						not played

== Anthem incident ==
Himno de Riego, an obsolete anthem of Spain, was played in the Australia vs Spain match. Juan Antonio Gomez Angulo, Spain's sport minister, left the stadium in protest and returned after the organizer apologized. For similar incidents, see list of wrong anthems incidents.
