= Mounir El Aarej =

Moroccan tennis player

- Full name: Mounir El Aarej
- Country (sports): Morocco
- Born: 16 June 1977 (age 49)
- Prize money: $127,514

Singles
- Career record: 8-23
- Career titles: 0
- Highest ranking: No. 319 (26 June 2000)

Doubles
- Career record: 4-19
- Career titles: 0
- Highest ranking: No. 278 (25 April 2005)
Medal record
Mediterranean Games
Bronze medal – third place	2001 Tunis	Doubles

Mounir El Aarej (born 16 June 1977) is a former professional tennis player from Morocco.

== Biography ==
A regular Davis Cup player for Morocco during his career, El Aarej made his debut in 1996, for a World Group qualifier against Switzerland in Olten.

He won a bronze medal in the doubles at the 2001 Mediterranean Games (with Mehdi Tahiri) and was a quarter-finalist in the singles draw.

In 2002 he beat a young Rafael Nadal in the semi-finals of a Futures tournament in Gandia. He also had a win that year in the Davis Cup over Switzerland's Michel Kratochvil, who was at the time ranked in the world's top 40.

El Aarej was a member of the team that beat Great Britain in a World Group play off in 2003. He also played in a playoff tie against Australia in Perth in the 2004 Davis Cup.

His best performance on the ATP Tour came when he made the doubles semi-finals at the 2004 Grand Prix Hassan II in Casablanca, with Mehdi Tahiri. He competed at the tournament, which was held in Casablanca, every year from 1997 to 2007, in either singles or doubles.

He featured in the Mediterranean Games again in 2005. Fourth in the singles, he lost his semi-final to top seed Nicolás Almagro in a final set tiebreak and was beaten in the bronze medal playoff by Simone Bolelli.

El Aarej, who had a Davis Cup win over Filippo Volandri in Rome in 2005, continued representing Morocco until 2008. By the time he retired he had featured in 19 ties and played 31 matches for Morocco.

== See also ==
- List of Morocco Davis Cup team representatives
