= Simon Larose =

Canadian tennis player

- Country (sports): Canada
- Born: June 28, 1978 (age 47) Cap-de-la-Madeleine, Quebec, Canada
- Height: 6 ft 3 in (1.91 m)
- Turned pro: 1998
- Retired: 2005 (after given 2 year ban)
- Plays: Right-handed (one-handed backhand)
- Coach: Martin Laurendeau
- Prize money: US$205,394

Singles
- Career record: 11–19
- Career titles: 0
- Highest ranking: No. 189 (19 July 2004)

Grand Slam singles results
- Australian Open: Q2 (2001)
- French Open: Q1 (2004)
- Wimbledon: Q2 (2001)
- US Open: Q1 (2004)

Doubles
- Career record: 6–8
- Career titles: 0
- Highest ranking: No. 149 (29 July 2002)

Simon Larose (born June 28, 1978) is a former professional tennis player. He was Canada's top-ranked singles player for some months during 2003 and 2004. Larose retired from the tour shortly after being banned for two years for substance abuse.

== Biography ==
Larose was born in Cap-de-la-Madeleine, Quebec, Canada. He joined the ATP professional tour at the age of 20 in 1998 having played collegiately at Mississippi State University. He was Canada's top-ranked singles player, according to the ATP rankings, in 2003 from January 6 until February 3, from May 19 until June 23, and from August 18 until October 13, and again in 2004 from July 12 until August 2. His best singles ATP ranking is World No. 189, which he achieved in July 2004.

Although Larose did not make any official announcement, he was quoted in the press as saying that he retired from tennis after being levied a two-year ban in February 2005 by the ATP for testing positive for cocaine. At the time of his supposed cocaine use, he had been out of action with a back injury.

Since his retirement from the ATP circuit Larose has been coaching at a local tennis club, moving on to coach for Tennis Canada.

Simon made Canadian radio history when he provided analysis on the first-ever Canadian English language production of the 2010 Rogers Cup tennis final along with CJAD 800's Rick Moffat (play-by-play) and Mark Shalhoub (courtside reporter).

Larose provided CJAD 800 coverage for the 2012 Rogers Cup and returns to the booth August 10–11 for the Men's Singles Semis and Final.

Larose has been successful as a coach. He was appointed the Canadian National team's head coach and has coached Rebecca Marino and Francoise Abanda.
