= 2014 Davis Cup Asia/Oceania Zone Group IV =

International tennis competition

The Asia/Oceania Zone was one of the three zones of regional Davis Cup competition in 2014.

In the Asia/Oceania Zone there were four different groups in which teams competed against each other to advance to the next group.

== Format ==
The ten teams were split into two round robin pools of five, with the winning nation from each pool playing against the runner-up from the other pool in promotion play-off matches. The winning teams from these matches were promoted to Group III in 2015.

The ties were played on the week commencing 9 June 2014 at Tehran, Iran and were played on outdoor clay courts.

== Groups ==
=== Group A ===
| Team | Ties Played | Ties Won | Ties Lost | Matches Won | Matches Lost | Standing |
|---|---|---|---|---|---|---|
| Pacific Oceania | 4 | 4 | 0 | 10 | 2 | 1 |
| Jordan | 4 | 3 | 1 | 8 | 4 | 2 |
| Bangladesh | 4 | 2 | 2 | 7 | 5 | 3 |
| Iraq | 4 | 1 | 3 | 5 | 7 | 4 |
| Kyrgyzstan | 4 | 0 | 4 | 0 | 12 | 5 |

==== Pacific Oceania vs. Kyrgyzstan ====
Pacific Oceania
3
Enghelab sports complex, Tehran, Iran
9 June 2014
clay (outdoor)

Kyrgyzstan
0

| | | | 1 | 2 | 3 |
|---|---|---|---|---|---|
| 1 | (Pacific Oceania) (Kyrgyzstan) | Aymeric Mara; Adilbek Mamatov | 6; 2 | 6; 1 |
| 2 | (Pacific Oceania) (Kyrgyzstan) | Juan Sebastien Langton; Maksim Serko | 6; 1 | 6; 4 |
| 3 | (Pacific Oceania) (Kyrgyzstan) | Gilles de Gouy / Daniel Llarenas; Abai Kanybek Uulu / Maksim Serko | 6; 1 | 6; 1 |

==== Jordan vs. Bangladesh ====
Jordan
3
Enghelab sports complex, Tehran, Iran
9 June 2014
clay (outdoor)

Bangladesh
0

| | | | 1 | 2 | 3 |
|---|---|---|---|---|---|
| 1 | (Jordan) (Bangladesh) | Ahmed Ibrahim Ahmad Alhadid; Henry Prithul Mondol | 6; 1 | 2; 6 | 6; 3 |
| 2 | (Jordan) (Bangladesh) | Hamzeh Al-Aswad; Sree-Amol Roy | 5; 7 | 6; 2 | 6; 3 |
| 3 | (Jordan) (Bangladesh) | Hamzeh Al-Aswad / Mousa Alkotop; Mamun Bapari / Ranjan Ram | 3; 6 | 6; 3 | 6; 3 |

==== Pacific Oceania vs. Bangladesh ====
Pacific Oceania
2
Enghelab sports complex, Tehran, Iran
10 June 2014
clay (outdoor)

Bangladesh
1

| | | | 1 | 2 | 3 |
|---|---|---|---|---|---|
| 1 | (Pacific Oceania) (Bangladesh) | Aymeric Mara; Henry Prithul Mondol | 4; 6 | 6; 4 | 2; 6 |
| 2 | (Pacific Oceania) (Bangladesh) | Juan Sebastien Langton; Sree-Amol Roy | 3; 6 | 7; 6 | 6; 3 |
| 3 | (Pacific Oceania) (Bangladesh) | Gilles de Gouy / Daniel Llarenas; Ranjan Ram / Sree-Amol Roy | 7; 6 | 6; 0 |

==== Jordan vs. Iraq ====
Jordan
2
Enghelab sports complex, Tehran, Iran
10 June 2014
clay (outdoor)

Iraq
1

| | | | 1 | 2 | 3 |
|---|---|---|---|---|---|
| 1 | (Jordan) (Iraq) | Ahmed Ibrahim Ahmad Alhadid; Akram M. Abdalkarem Al-Saady | 6; 3 | 6; 3 |
| 2 | (Jordan) (Iraq) | Hamzeh Al-Aswad; Ali Khairi Hashim Al Mayahi | 3; 6 | 3; 6 |
| 3 | (Jordan) (Iraq) | Ahmed Ibrahim Ahmad Alhadid / Mousa Alkotop; Ali Khairi Hashim Al Mayahi / Akram M. Abdalkarem Al-Saady | 6; 2 | 2; 6 | 6; 2 |

==== Pacific Oceania vs. Jordan ====
Pacific Oceania
3
Enghelab sports complex, Tehran, Iran
11 June 2014
clay (outdoor)

Jordan
0

| | | | 1 | 2 | 3 |
|---|---|---|---|---|---|
| 1 | (Pacific Oceania) (Jordan) | Aymeric Mara; Mousa Alkotop | 4; 6 | 6; 4 | 6; 3 |
| 2 | (Pacific Oceania) (Jordan) | Juan Sebastien Langton; Hamzeh Al-Aswad | 6; 2 | 7; 6 |
| 3 | (Pacific Oceania) (Jordan) | Gilles de Gouy / Daniel Llarenas; Hamzeh Al-Aswad / Tareq Talal Shkakwa | 4; 6 | 7; 6 | 6; 0 |

==== Iraq vs. Kyrgyzstan ====
Iraq
3
Enghelab sports complex, Tehran, Iran
11 June 2014
clay (outdoor)

Kyrgyzstan
0

| | | | 1 | 2 | 3 |
|---|---|---|---|---|---|
| 1 | (Iraq) (Kyrgyzstan) | Barakat Zainy; Adilbek Mamatov | 6; 1 | 6; 4 |
| 2 | (Iraq) (Kyrgyzstan) | Ali Khairi Hashim Al Mayahi; Maksim Serko | 6; 4 | 6; 3 |
| 3 | (Iraq) (Kyrgyzstan) | Ali Khairi Hashim Al Mayahi / Akram M. Abdalkarem Al-Saady; Adilbek Mamatov / Maksim Serko | 6; 1 | 6; 1 |

==== Pacific Oceania vs. Iraq ====
Pacific Oceania
2
Enghelab sports complex, Tehran, Iran
12 June 2014
clay (outdoor)

Iraq
1

| | | | 1 | 2 | 3 |
|---|---|---|---|---|---|
| 1 | (Pacific Oceania) (Iraq) | Aymeric Mara; Barakat Zainy | 6; 3 | 3; 6 | 6; 2 |
| 2 | (Pacific Oceania) (Iraq) | Juan Sebastien Langton; Ali Khairi Hashim Al Mayahi | 2; 6 | 1; 6 |
| 3 | (Pacific Oceania) (Iraq) | Gilles de Gouy / Daniel Llarenas; Ali Khairi Hashim Al Mayahi / Akram M. Abdalkarem Al-Saady | 6; 3 | 7; 6 |

==== Bangladesh vs. Kyrgyzstan ====
Bangladesh
3
Enghelab sports complex, Tehran, Iran
12 June 2014
clay (outdoor)

Kyrgyzstan
0

| | | | 1 | 2 | 3 |
|---|---|---|---|---|---|---|
| 1 | (Bangladesh) (Kyrgyzstan) | Henry Prithul Mondol; Adilbek Mamatov | 6; 3 | 6; 0 |
| 2 | (Bangladesh) (Kyrgyzstan) | Sree-Amol Roy; Maksim Serko | 6; 2 | 6; 0 |
| 3 | (Bangladesh) (Kyrgyzstan) | Ranjan Ram / Sree-Amol Roy; Abai Kanybek Uulu / Maksim Serko | 0; 0 | | | retired |

==== Jordan vs. Kyrgyzstan ====
Jordan
3
Enghelab sports complex, Tehran, Iran
13 June 2014
clay (outdoor)

Kyrgyzstan
0

| | | | 1 | 2 | 3 |
|---|---|---|---|---|---|
| 1 | (Jordan) (Kyrgyzstan) | Mousa Alkotop; Abai Kanybek Uulu | 6; 0 | 6; 0 |
| 2 | (Jordan) (Kyrgyzstan) | Ahmed Ibrahim Ahmad Alhadid; Maksim Serko | 6; 0 | 6; 0 |
| 3 | (Jordan) (Kyrgyzstan) | Hamzeh Al-Aswad / Tareq Talal Shkakwa; Abai Kanybek Uulu / Maksim Serko | 6; 1 | 6; 1 |

==== Bangladesh vs. Iraq ====
Bangladesh
3
Enghelab sports complex, Tehran, Iran
13 June 2014
clay (outdoor)

Iraq
0

| | | | 1 | 2 | 3 |
|---|---|---|---|---|---|
| 1 | (Bangladesh) (Iraq) | Henry Prithul Mondol; Adel Mustafa Al-Saedi | 6; 2 | 6; 2 |
| 2 | (Bangladesh) (Iraq) | Sree-Amol Roy; Akram M. Abdalkarem Al-Saady | 6; 1 | 6; 0 |
| 3 | (Bangladesh) (Iraq) | Mamun Bapari / Sree-Amol Roy; Ali Khairi Hashim Al Mayahi / Barakat Zainy | 7; 6 | 6; 4 |

=== Group B ===
| Team | Ties Played | Ties Won | Ties Lost | Matches Won | Matches Lost | Standing |
|---|---|---|---|---|---|---|
| Saudi Arabia | 4 | 4 | 0 | 9 | 3 | 1 |
| Qatar | 4 | 3 | 1 | 10 | 2 | 2 |
| Mongolia | 4 | 2 | 2 | 6 | 6 | 3 |
| Bahrain | 4 | 1 | 3 | 5 | 7 | 4 |
| Oman | 4 | 0 | 4 | 0 | 12 | 5 |

==== Qatar vs. Mongolia ====
Qatar
3
Enghelab sports complex, Tehran, Iran
9 June 2014
clay (outdoor)

Mongolia
0

| | | | 1 | 2 | 3 |
|---|---|---|---|---|---|
| 1 | (Qatar) (Mongolia) | Jabor Mohammed Ali Mutawa; Munkhbaatar Badrakh | 7; 5 | 2; 6 | 6; 4 |
| 2 | (Qatar) (Mongolia) | Mubarak Al Harrasi; Baatar Oyunbat | 6; 0 | 6; 2 |
| 3 | (Qatar) (Mongolia) | Ali Al-Saygh / Mousa Shanan Zayed; Oyunbold Baatar / Gunsenkhorloo Nyamdelger | 6; 1 | 6; 0 |

==== Saudi Arabia vs. Oman ====
Saudi Arabia
3
Enghelab sports complex, Tehran, Iran
9 June 2014
clay (outdoor)

Oman
0

| | | | 1 | 2 | 3 |
|---|---|---|---|---|---|
| 1 | (Saudi Arabia) (Oman) | Fahad Al Saad; Abdullah Al Barwani | 6; 3 | 6; 4 |
| 2 | (Saudi Arabia) (Oman) | Ammar Alhaqbani; Younis Al Rawahi | 6; 0 | 6; 1 |
| 3 | (Saudi Arabia) (Oman) | Mohammed Alsoughayer / Abdulmalek Burasais; Omran Al Balushi / Zakariya Alsuleimani | 6; 1 | 6; 1 |

==== Qatar vs. Oman ====
Qatar
3
Enghelab sports complex, Tehran, Iran
10 June 2014
clay (outdoor)

Oman
0

| | | | 1 | 2 | 3 |
|---|---|---|---|---|---|
| 1 | (Qatar) (Oman) | Jabor Mohammed Ali Mutawa; Abdullah Al Barwani | 6; 0 | 6; 0 |
| 2 | (Qatar) (Oman) | Mubarak Al Harrasi; Younis Al Rawahi | 6; 0 | 6; 0 |
| 3 | (Qatar) (Oman) | Ali Al-Saygh / Mousa Shanan Zayed; Omran Al Balushi / Zakariya Alsuleimani | 6; 1 | 6; 1 |

==== Saudi Arabia vs. Bahrain ====
Saudi Arabia
2
Enghelab sports complex, Tehran, Iran
10 June 2014
clay (outdoor)

Bahrain
1

| | | | 1 | 2 | 3 |
|---|---|---|---|---|---|
| 1 | (Saudi Arabia) (Bahrain) | Fahad Al Saad; Ayman Abdul-Nabi | 4; 6 | 6; 2 | 7; 5 |
| 2 | (Saudi Arabia) (Bahrain) | Ammar Alhaqbani; Hasan Abdulnabi | 6; 2 | 6; 1 |
| 3 | (Saudi Arabia) (Bahrain) | Mohammed Alsoughayer / Abdulmalek Burasais; Abdulkarim Abdulnabi / Hasan Abdulnabi | 4; 6 | 0; 6 |

==== Qatar vs. Saudi Arabia ====
Qatar
1
Enghelab sports complex, Tehran, Iran
11 June 2014
clay (outdoor)

Saudi Arabia
2

| | | | 1 | 2 | 3 |
|---|---|---|---|---|---|
| 1 | (Qatar) (Saudi Arabia) | Jabor Mohammed Ali Mutawa; Fahad Al Saad | 6; 3 | 6; 4 |
| 2 | (Qatar) (Saudi Arabia) | Mubarak Al Harrasi; Ammar Alhaqbani | 6; 3 | 6; 7 | 6; 7 |
| 3 | (Qatar) (Saudi Arabia) | Jabor Mohammed Ali Mutawa / Mousa Shanan Zayed; Fahad Al Saad / Ammar Alhaqbani | 4; 6 | 2; 6 |

==== Bahrain vs. Mongolia ====
Bahrain
1
Enghelab sports complex, Tehran, Iran
11 June 2014
clay (outdoor)

Mongolia
2

| | | | 1 | 2 | 3 |
|---|---|---|---|---|---|
| 1 | (Bahrain) (Mongolia) | Abdulkarim Abdulnabi; Munkhbaatar Badrakh | 0; 6 | 0; 6 |
| 2 | (Bahrain) (Mongolia) | Ayman Abdul-Nabi; Baatar Oyunbat | 6; 7 | 2; 6 |
| 3 | (Bahrain) (Mongolia) | Abdulkarim Abdulnabi / Hasan Abdulnabi; Munkhbaatar Badrakh / Baatar Oyunbat | 7; 6 | 3; 6 | 6; 3 |

==== Qatar vs. Bahrain ====
Qatar
3
Enghelab sports complex, Tehran, Iran
12 June 2014
clay (outdoor)

Bahrain
0

| | | | 1 | 2 | 3 |
|---|---|---|---|---|---|---|
| 1 | (Qatar) (Bahrain) | Jabor Mohammed Ali Mutawa; Abdulkarim Abdulnabi | 6; 2 | 7; 5 |
| 2 | (Qatar) (Bahrain) | Mubarak Al Harrasi; Ayman Abdul-Nabi | 6; 1 | | | retired |
| 3 | (Qatar) (Bahrain) | Ali Al-Saygh / Mousa Shanan Zayed; Mohamed Esam Abdulaal / Abdulkarim Abdulnabi | 7; 5 | 6; 2 |

==== Oman vs. Mongolia ====
Oman
0
Enghelab sports complex, Tehran, Iran
12 June 2014
clay (outdoor)

Mongolia
3

| | | | 1 | 2 | 3 |
|---|---|---|---|---|---|
| 1 | (Oman) (Mongolia) | Omran Al Balushi; Munkhbaatar Badrakh | 0; 6 | 2; 6 |
| 2 | (Oman) (Mongolia) | Younis Al Rawahi; Oyunbold Baatar | 4; 6 | 3; 6 |
| 3 | (Oman) (Mongolia) | Omran Al Balushi / Younis Al Rawahi; Munkhbaatar Badrakh / Baatar Oyunbat | 2; 6 | 2; 6 |

==== Saudi Arabia vs. Mongolia ====
Saudi Arabia
2
Enghelab sports complex, Tehran, Iran
13 June 2014
clay (outdoor)

Mongolia
1

| | | | 1 | 2 | 3 |
|---|---|---|---|---|---|---|
| 1 | (Saudi Arabia) (Mongolia) | Fahad Al Saad; Munkhbaatar Badrakh | 6; 3 | 7; 6 |
| 2 | (Saudi Arabia) (Mongolia) | Ammar Alhaqbani; Baatar Oyunbat | 6; 2 | 6; 2 |
| 3 | (Saudi Arabia) (Mongolia) | Ammar Alhaqbani / Abdulmalek Burasais; Munkhbaatar Badrakh / Baatar Oyunbat | 5; 7 | | | retired |

==== Oman vs. Bahrain ====
Oman
0
Enghelab sports complex, Tehran, Iran
13 June 2014
clay (outdoor)

Bahrain
3

| | | | 1 | 2 | 3 |
|---|---|---|---|---|---|
| 1 | (Oman) (Bahrain) | Omran Al Balushi; Abdulkarim Abdulnabi | 0; 6 | 1; 6 |
| 2 | (Oman) (Bahrain) | Younis Al Rawahi; Hasan Abdulnabi | 2; 6 | 3; 6 |
| 3 | (Oman) (Bahrain) | Omran Al Balushi / Younis Al Rawahi; Mohamed Esam Abdulaal / Abdulkarim Abdulnabi | 6; 7 | 3; 6 |

== Play-offs ==
=== 1st to 4th play-off ===
==== Pacific Oceania vs. Qatar ====
Pacific Oceania
1
Enghelab sports complex, Tehran, Iran
14 June 2014
clay (outdoor)

Qatar
2

| | | | 1 | 2 | 3 |
|---|---|---|---|---|---|
| 1 | (Pacific Oceania) (Qatar) | Aymeric Mara; Jabor Mohammed Ali Mutawa | 3; 6 | 3; 6 |
| 2 | (Pacific Oceania) (Qatar) | Juan Sebastien Langton; Mubarak Al Harrasi | 1; 6 | 2; 6 |
| 3 | (Pacific Oceania) (Qatar) | Gilles De Gouy / Daniel Llarenas; Ali Al-Saygh / Mousa Shanan Zayed | 6; 3 | 7; 5 |

==== Jordan vs. Saudi Arabia ====
Jordan
0
Enghelab sports complex, Tehran, Iran
14 June 2014
clay(outdoor)

Saudi Arabia
2

| | | | 1 | 2 | 3 |
|---|---|---|---|---|---|---|
| 1 | (Jordan) (Saudi Arabia) | Mousa Alkotop; Fahad Al Saad | 2; 6 | 3; 6 |
| 2 | (Jordan) (Saudi Arabia) | Ahmed Ibrahim Ahmad Alhadid; Ammar Alhaqbani | 2; 6 | 6; 7 |
| 3 | (Jordan) (Saudi Arabia) | Hamzeh Al-Aswad / Mousa Alkotop; Mohammed Alsoughayer / Abdulmalek Burasais | | | | not played |

=== 5th to 6th play-off ===
==== Bangladesh vs. Mongolia ====
Bangladesh
2
Enghelab sports complex, Tehran, Iran
14 June 2014
clay(outdoor)

Mongolia
1

| | | | 1 | 2 | 3 |
|---|---|---|---|---|---|
| 1 | (Bangladesh) (Mongolia) | Ranjan Ram; Munkhbaatar Badrakh | 5; 7 | 7; 6 | 3; 6 |
| 2 | (Bangladesh) (Mongolia) | Sree-Amol Roy; Baatar Oyunbat | 6; 2 | 6; 1 |
| 3 | (Bangladesh) (Mongolia) | Henry Prithul Mondol / Sree-Amol Roy; Munkhbaatar Badrakh / Baatar Oyunbat | 6; 3 | 6; 4 |

=== 7th to 8th play-off ===
==== Iraq vs. Bahrain ====
Iraq
2
Enghelab sports complex, Tehran, Iran
14 June 2014
clay(outdoor)

Bahrain
1

| | | | 1 | 2 | 3 |
|---|---|---|---|---|---|
| 1 | (Iraq) (Bahrain) | Barakat Zainy; Mohamed Esam Abdulaal | 6; 2 | 6; 2 |
| 2 | (Iraq) (Bahrain) | Ali Khairi Hashim Al Mayahi; Abdulkarim Abdulnabi | 2; 6 | 7; 5 | 3; 6 |
| 3 | (Iraq) (Bahrain) | Ali Khairi Hashim Al Mayahi / Akram M. Abdalkarem Al-Saady; Mohamed Esam Abdulaal / Abdulkarim Abdulnabi | 6; 3 | 6; 3 |

=== 9th to 10th play-off ===
==== Kyrgyzstan vs. Oman ====
Kyrgyzstan
2
Enghelab sports complex, Tehran, Iran
14 June 2014
clay(outdoor)

Oman
1

| | | | 1 | 2 | 3 |
|---|---|---|---|---|---|
| 1 | (Kyrgyzstan) (Oman) | Adilbek Mamatov; Abdullah Al Barwani | 7; 6 | 7; 6 |
| 2 | (Kyrgyzstan) (Oman) | Maksim Serko; Younis Al Rawahi | 5; 7 | 4; 6 |
| 3 | (Kyrgyzstan) (Oman) | Adilbek Mamatov / Maksim Serko; Omran Al Balushi / Abdullah Al Barwani | 6; 4 | 6; 4 |

== Final standings ==
| Rank | Team |
|---|---|
| 1 | Saudi Arabia |
| 2 | Qatar |
| 3 | Pacific Oceania |
| 4 | Jordan |
| 5 | Bangladesh |
| 6 | Mongolia |
| 7 | Iraq |
| 8 | Bahrain |
| 9 | Kyrgyzstan |
| 10 | Oman |

- Saudi Arabia and Qatar promoted to Group III in 2015.
