= 2013 Davis Cup Asia/Oceania Zone Group IV =

International tennis competition

The Asia/Oceania Zone is one of the three zones of regional Davis Cup competition in 2013.

In the Asia/Oceania Zone there are four different groups in which teams compete against each other to advance to the next group.

== Teams ==
The 2013 Davis Cup Asia/Oceania Zone Group IV consisted of the following teams:

=== Group A ===
- Bahrain
- Bangladesh
- Iraq
- Singapore
- Turkmenistan

=== Group B ===
- Jordan
- Kyrgyzstan
- Myanmar
- Qatar
- Saudi Arabia

== Format ==
The ten teams are split into two pools of five, the top nation from each pool play against the runner-up from the other pool. The two winners will be promoted.

The tournament was played on the week commencing 9 September 2013 at Aviation Tennis Club, Dubai, United Arab Emirates and it was played on outdoor hard court.

== Groups ==
=== Group A ===
Team	Ties Played	Ties Won	Ties Lost	Matches Won	Matches Lost	Standing
Turkmenistan	4	4	0	11	1	1
Singapore	4	3	1	9	3	2
Bahrain	4	2	2	4	8	3
Bangladesh	4	1	3	4	8	4
Iraq	4	0	4	2	10	5

==== Bangladesh v Turkmenistan ====
Bangladesh
0
Dubai Aviation Club, Dubai, United Arab Emirates
9 September 2013
hard (outdoor)

Turkmenistan
3

			1	2	3
1	(Bangladesh) (Turkmenistan)	Mohammed Anwar Hossain; Georgiy Pochay	2; 6	0; 6
2	(Bangladesh) (Turkmenistan)	Sree-Amol Roy; Aleksandr Ernepesov	4; 6	4; 6
3	(Bangladesh) (Turkmenistan)	Mohammad Jamil Bhuiyan / Sree Biplob Ram; Aleksandr Ernepesov / Georgiy Pochay	1; 6	2; 6

==== Singapore v Bahrain ====
Singapore
3
Dubai Aviation Club, Dubai, United Arab Emirates
9 September 2013
hard (outdoor)

Bahrain
0

			1	2	3
1	(Singapore) (Bahrain)	Rohan Kamdar; Yusuf Qaed	6; 3	6; 1
2	(Singapore) (Bahrain)	Roy Hobbs; Abdulkarim Abdulnabi	6; 3	6; 4
3	(Singapore) (Bahrain)	Fu Koh / Yong Jie Isaac Ong; Abdulkarim Abdulnabi / Hasan Abdulnabi	6; 1	6; 4

==== Bangladesh v Iraq ====
Bangladesh
2
Dubai Aviation Club, Dubai, United Arab Emirates
10 September 2013
hard (outdoor)

Iraq
1

			1	2	3
1	(Bangladesh) (Iraq)	Mohammad Jamil Bhuiyan; Ahmed Abdulhasan	6; 3	2; 6	6; 7
2	(Bangladesh) (Iraq)	Sree-Amol Roy; Ali Hashim	6; 0	6; 2
3	(Bangladesh) (Iraq)	Sree Biplob Ram / Sree Amol Roy; Ahmed Abdulhasan / Ali Hashmim	6; 4	6; 2

==== Singapore v Turkmenistan ====
Singapore
1
Dubai Aviation Club, Dubai, United Arab Emirates
10 September 2013
hard (outdoor)

Turkmenistan
2

			1	2	3
1	(Singapore) (Turkmenistan)	Rohan Kamdar; Georgiy Pochay	2; 6	2; 6
2	(Singapore) (Turkmenistan)	Roy Hobbs; Aleksandr Ernepesov	6; 4	7; 6
3	(Singapore) (Turkmenistan)	Roy Hobbs / Yong Jie Isaac Ong; Eziz Dovletov / Georgiy Pochay	4; 6	5; 7

==== Bangladesh v Singapore ====
Bangladesh
1
Dubai Aviation Club, Dubai, United Arab Emirates
11 September 2013
hard (outdoor)

Singapore
2

			1	2	3
1	(Bangladesh) (Singapore)	Mohammad Jamil Bhuiyan; Yong Jie Isaac Ong	6; 7	0; 6
2	(Bangladesh) (Singapore)	Sree-Amol Roy; Roy Hobbs	7; 5	7; 5
3	(Bangladesh) (Singapore)	Sree Biplob Ram / Sree Amol Roy; Roy Hobbs / Rohan Kamdar	5; 7	2; 6

==== Iraq v Bahrain ====
Iraq
1
Dubai Aviation Club, Dubai, United Arab Emirates
11 September 2013
hard (outdoor)

Bahrain
2

			1	2	3
1	(Iraq) (Bahrain)	Maab Abdulrazaq Yaseen; Yusuf Qaed	7; 6	6; 1
2	(Iraq) (Bahrain)	Ahmed Abdulhasan; Hasan Abdulnabi	1; 6	1; 6
3	(Iraq) (Bahrain)	Ali Hashim / Maab Abdulrazaq Yaseen; Abdulkarim Abdulnabi / Hasan Abdulnabi	3; 6	6; 3	4; 6

==== Bangladesh v Bahrain ====
Bangladesh
1
Dubai Aviation Club, Dubai, United Arab Emirates
12 September 2013
hard (outdoor)

Bahrain
2

			1	2	3
1	(Bangladesh) (Bahrain)	Mohammed Anwar Hossain; Yusuf Qaed	2; 6	1; 6
2	(Bangladesh) (Bahrain)	Sree-Amol Roy; Hasan Abdulnabi	6; 4	6; 2
3	(Bangladesh) (Bahrain)	Sree Biplob Ram / Sree Amol Roy; Abdulkarim Abdulnabi / Hasan Abdulnabi	6; 7	4; 6

==== Turkmenistan v Iraq ====
Turkmenistan
3
Dubai Aviation Club, Dubai, United Arab Emirates
12 September 2013
hard (outdoor)

Iraq
0

			1	2	3
1	(Turkmenistan) (Iraq)	Georgiy Pochay; Ahmed Abdulhasan	7; 5	6; 2
2	(Turkmenistan) (Iraq)	Aleksandr Ernepesov; Ali Hashim	6; 2	6; 0
3	(Turkmenistan) (Iraq)	Eziz Dovletov / Aleksandr Ernepesov; Ali Hashim / Maab Abdulrazaq Yaseen	6; 3	3; 6	6; 1

==== Turkmenistan v Bahrain ====
Turkmenistan
3
Dubai Aviation Club, Dubai, United Arab Emirates
13 September 2013
hard (outdoor)

Bahrain
0

			1	2	3
1	(Turkmenistan) (Bahrain)	Georgiy Pochay; Abdulkarim Abdulnabi	6; 3	6; 2
2	(Turkmenistan) (Bahrain)	Aleksandr Ernepesov; Hasan Abdulnabi	6; 1	6; 2
3	(Turkmenistan) (Bahrain)	Eziz Dovletov / Georgiy Pochay; Khalid Almosawi / Yusuf Qaed	7; 5	6; 1

==== Singapore v Iraq ====
Singapore
3
Dubai Aviation Club, Dubai, United Arab Emirates
12 September 2013
hard (outdoor)

Iraq
0

			1	2	3
1	(Singapore) (Iraq)	Yong Jie Isaac Ong; Maab Abdulrazaq Yaseen	6; 2	6; 2
2	(Singapore) (Iraq)	Roy Hobbs; Ali Hashim	6; 7	6; 1	6; 2
3	(Singapore) (Iraq)	Rohan Kamdar / Fu Koh; Ahmed Abdulhasan / Maab Abdulrazaq Yaseen	6; 1	6; 2	1

=== Group B ===
Team	Ties Played	Ties Won	Ties Lost	Matches Won	Matches Lost	Standing
Qatar	4	4	0	10	2	1
Saudi Arabia	4	3	1	8	4	2
Jordan	4	2	2	7	5	3
Myanmar	4	1	3	5	7	4
Kyrgyzstan	4	0	4	0	12	5

==== Qatar v Saudi Arabia ====
Qatar
2
Dubai Aviation Club, Dubai, United Arab Emirates
9 September 2013
hard (outdoor)

Saudi Arabia
1

			1	2	3
1	(Qatar) (Saudi Arabia)	Sultan Khalfan Al Alawi; Fahad Al Saad	4; 6	6^{6} 7^{8}
2	(Qatar) (Saudi Arabia)	Mubarak Shannan Zayid Alharrasi; Saleh Alrajeh	6; 3	6; 3
3	(Qatar) (Saudi Arabia)	Sultan Khalfan Al Alawi / Mousa Shanan Zayed; Fahad Al Saad / Saleh Alrajeh	6; 0	6; 4

==== Jordan v Myanmar ====
Jordan
2
Dubai Aviation Club, Dubai, United Arab Emirates
9 September 2013
hard (outdoor)

Myanmar
1

			1	2	3
1	(Jordan) (Myanmar)	Fawaz El Hourani; Zaw-Zaw Latt	6; 4	0; 6	0; 6
2	(Jordan) (Myanmar)	Mohammad Alaisowi; Aung Kyaw Naing	6; 2	6; 1
3	(Jordan) (Myanmar)	Mohammad Alaisowi / Fawaz El Hourani; Nge Hnaung / Zaw-Zaw Latt	7^{7} 6^{2}	6; 3

==== Qatar v Kyrgyzstan ====
Qatar
3
Dubai Aviation Club, Dubai, United Arab Emirates
10 September 2013
hard (outdoor)

Kyrgyzstan
0

			1	2	3
1	(Qatar) (Kyrgyzstan)	Mubarak Shannan Zayid Alharrasi; Rufat Mirdzhaliev	6; 1	6; 1
2	(Qatar) (Kyrgyzstan)	Mousa Shanan Zayed; Adilbek Mamatov	6; 4	6; 0
3	(Qatar) (Kyrgyzstan)	Abdulla Al Mohamoud / Mousa Shanan Zayed; Baatai Maksatov / Shirzat Sadykov	6; 0	6; 1

==== Jordan v Saudi Arabia ====
Jordan
1
Dubai Aviation Club, Dubai, United Arab Emirates
10 September 2013
hard (outdoor)

Saudi Arabia
2

			1	2	3
1	(Jordan) (Saudi Arabia)	Fawaz El Hourani; Fahad Al Saad	3; 6	3; 6
2	(Jordan) (Saudi Arabia)	Mohammad Alaisowi; Saleh Alrajeh	4; 6	7^{7} 6^{5}	3; 6
3	(Jordan) (Saudi Arabia)	Hamzeh Al-Aswad / Fawaz El Hourani; Fahad Al Saad / Abdulrahman Alazzam	7^{7} 6^{5}	6; 0

==== Qatar v Jordan ====
Qatar
2
Dubai Aviation Club, Dubai, United Arab Emirates
11 September 2013
hard (outdoor)

Jordan
1

			1	2	3
1	(Qatar) (Jordan)	Sultan Khalfan Al Alawi; Mohammad Alaisowi	6; 1	2; 6	4; 6
2	(Qatar) (Jordan)	Mubarak Shannan Zayid Alharrasi; Hamzeh Al-Aswad	6; 4	7^{7} 6^{1}
3	(Qatar) (Jordan)	Mousa Shanan Zayed / Mubarak Shannan Zayid Alharrasi; Mohammad Alaisowi / Fawaz El Hourani	7; 5	6; 3

==== Kyrgyzstan v Myanmar ====
Kyrgyzstan
0
Dubai Aviation Club, Dubai, United Arab Emirates
11 September 2013
hard (outdoor)

Myanmar
3

			1	2	3
1	(Kyrgyzstan) (Myanmar)	Rufat Mirdzhaliev; Zaw-Zaw Latt	2; 6	2; 6
2	(Kyrgyzstan) (Myanmar)	Adilbek Mamatov; Aung Kyaw Naing	0; 6	2; 6
3	(Kyrgyzstan) (Myanmar)	Adilbek Mamatov / Rufat Mirdzhaliev; Nge Hnaung / Zaw-Zaw Latt	3; 6	2; 6

==== Qatar v Myanmar ====
Qatar
3
Dubai Aviation Club, Dubai, United Arab Emirates
12 September 2013
hard (outdoor)

Myanmar
0

			1	2	3
1	(Qatar) (Myanmar)	Mubarak Shannan Zayid Alharrasi; Zaw-Zaw Latt	6; 3	6; 2
2	(Qatar) (Myanmar)	Mousa Shanan Zayed; Nge Hnaung	6^{0} 7^{7}	6; 3	7; 5
3	(Qatar) (Myanmar)	Sultan Khalfan Al Alawi / Abdulla Al Mohamoud; Zaw-Zaw Latt / Min Min	6^{4} 7^{7}	6; 3	6; 3

==== Saudi Arabia v Kyrgyzstan ====
Saudi Arabia
3
Dubai Aviation Club, Dubai, United Arab Emirates
12 September 2013
hard (outdoor)

Kyrgyzstan
0

			1	2	3
1	(Saudi Arabia) (Kyrgyzstan)	Fahad Al Saad; Rufat Mirdzhaliev	6; 1	6; 0
2	(Saudi Arabia) (Kyrgyzstan)	Saleh Alrajeh; Adilbek Mamatov	6; 1	6; 0
3	(Saudi Arabia) (Kyrgyzstan)	Abdulrahman Alazzam / Alwaleed Alsayyah; Baatai Maksatov / Shirzat Sadykov	6; 1	6; 0

==== Saudi Arabia v Myanmar ====
Saudi Arabia
2
Dubai Aviation Club, Dubai, United Arab Emirates
13 September 2013
hard (outdoor)

Myanmar
1

			1	2	3
1	(Saudi Arabia) (Myanmar)	Fahad Al Saad; Nge Hnaung	6; 2	6; 3
2	(Saudi Arabia) (Myanmar)	Saleh Alrajeh; Aung Kyaw Naing	1; 6	6; 0	6; 4
3	(Saudi Arabia) (Myanmar)	Abdulrahman Alazzam / Alwaleed Alsayyah; Nge Hnaung / Zaw-Zaw Latt	1; 6	3; 6

==== Jordan v Kyrgyzstan ====
Jordan
3
Dubai Aviation Club, Dubai, United Arab Emirates
13 September 2013
hard (outdoor)

Kyrgyzstan
0

			1	2	3
1	(Jordan) (Kyrgyzstan)	Fawaz El Hourani; Rufat Mirdzhaliev	6; 1	6; 3
2	(Jordan) (Kyrgyzstan)	Mohammad Alaisowi; Adilbek Mamatov	6; 2	6; 2
3	(Jordan) (Kyrgyzstan)	Hamzeh Al-Aswad / Fawaz El Hourani; Adilbek Mamatov / Shirzat Sadykov	6; 0	6; 1

== Play-offs ==
=== 1st to 4th play-off ===
==== Turkmenistan v Saudi Arabia ====
Turkmenistan
2
Dubai Aviation Club, Dubai, United Arab Emirates
14 September 2013
hard (outdoor)

Saudi Arabia
0

			1	2	3
1	(Turkmenistan) (Saudi Arabia)	Georgiy Pochay; Fahad Al Saad	1; 6	6; 3	6; 3
2	(Turkmenistan) (Saudi Arabia)	Aleksandr Ernepesov; Saleh Alrajeh	6; 1	6; 2
3	(Turkmenistan) (Saudi Arabia)

==== Qatar v Singapore ====
Qatar
1
Dubai Aviation Club, Dubai, United Arab Emirates
14 September 2013
hard (outdoor)

Singapore
2

			1	2	3
1	(Qatar) (Singapore)	Mubarak Shannan Zayid Alharrasi; Yong Jie Isaac Ong	2; 6	6^{5} 7^{7}
2	(Qatar) (Singapore)	Mousa Shanan Zayed; Roy Hobbs	6^{4} 7^{7}	7; 5	6; 3
3	(Qatar) (Singapore)	Sultan Khalfan Al Alawi / Mousa Shanan Zayed; Roy Hobbs / Rohan Kamdar	4; 6	2; 6

=== 5th to 6th play-off ===
==== Bahrain v Jordan ====
Bahrain
0
Dubai Aviation Club, Dubai, United Arab Emirates
14 September 2013
hard (outdoor)

Jordan
2

			1	2	3
1	(Bahrain) (Jordan)	Khalid Almosawi; Fawaz El Hourani	1; 6	1; 6
2	(Bahrain) (Jordan)	Yusuf Qaed; Mohammad Alaisowi	2; 6	0; 6
3	(Bahrain) (Jordan)

=== 7th to 8th play-off ===
==== Bangladesh v Myanmar ====
Bangladesh
0
Dubai Aviation Club, Dubai, United Arab Emirates
14 September 2013
hard (outdoor)

Myanmar
2

			1	2	3
1	(Bangladesh) (Myanmar)	Sree Biplob Ram; Zaw-Zaw Latt	1; 6	1; 6
2	(Bangladesh) (Myanmar)	Mohammad Jamil Bhuiyan; Aung Kyaw Naing	4; 6	1; 6
3	(Bangladesh) (Myanmar)

=== 9th to 10th play-off ===
==== Iraq v Kyrgyzstan ====
Iraq
2
Dubai Aviation Club, Dubai, United Arab Emirates
14 September 2013
hard (outdoor)

Kyrgyzstan
0

			1	2	3
1	(Iraq) (Kyrgyzstan)	Maab Abdulrazaq Yaseen; Shirzat Sadykov	6; 0	6; 0
2	(Iraq) (Kyrgyzstan)	Ali Hashim; Adilbek Mamatov	7^{7} 6^{5}	7; 5
3	(Iraq) (Kyrgyzstan)

== Final standings ==
Rank	Team
1	Turkmenistan
2	Singapore
3	Qatar
4	Saudi Arabia
5	Jordan
6	Bahrain
7	Myanmar
8	Bangladesh
9	Iraq
10	Kyrgyzstan

- Turkmenistan and Singapore promoted to Group III in 2014.
