= 2017 Davis Cup Asia/Oceania Zone Group IV =

International tennis competition

The Asia/Oceania Zone was the unique zone within Group 4 of the regional Davis Cup competition in 2017. The zone's competition was held in round robin format in Isa Town, Bahrain, from 3 April to 8 April 2017. The two winning nations won promotion to Group III, Asia/Oceania Zone, for 2018.

== Participating nations ==
- Bahrain
- Bangladesh
- Cambodia
- Iraq
- Kyrgyzstan
- Mongolia
- Myanmar
- Oman
- Saudi Arabia
- Singapore
- Tajikistan

=== Inactive nations ===
- Brunei
- Yemen

== Draw ==
Date: 3–8 April

Location: Bahrain Polytechnic, Isa Town, Bahrain (hard)

Format: Round-robin basis. Two pools of five and six teams, respectively (Pools A and B). The winner of each pool plays off against the runner-up of the other pool to determine which two nations are promoted to Asia/Oceania Zone Group III in 2018.

Seeding: The seeding was based on the Davis Cup Rankings of 20 February 2017 (shown in parentheses below).

Pot 1	Pot 2	Pot 3	Pot 4	Pot 5
1. Cambodia (101); 2. Iraq (106)	3. Bahrain (107); 4. Singapore (107)	5. Saudi Arabia (111); 6. Bangladesh (112)	7. Myanmar (120); 8. Oman (122)	9. Tajikistan (123); 10. Mongolia (124); 11. Kyrgyzstan (126)

=== Pool A ===
		CAM	KSA	MYA	BHR	KGZ	RR; W–L	Set; W–L	Game; W–L	Standings
101	Cambodia		2–1	3–0	3–0	2–1	4–0	20–8 (71%)	150–92 (62%)	1
111	Saudi Arabia	1–2		3–0	3–0	3–0	3–1	20–7 (74%)	137–91 (60%)	2
120	Myanmar	0–3	0–3		2–1	2–1	2–2	10–17 (37%)	106–140 (43%)	3
107	Bahrain	0–3	0–3	1–2		3–0	1–3	12–17 (41%)	123–141 (47%)	4
126	Kyrgyzstan	1–2	0–3	1–2	0–3		0–4	7–20 (26%)	98–150 (40%)	5

Standings are determined by: 1. number of wins; 2. number of matches; 3. in two-team ties, head-to-head records; 4. in three-team ties, (a) percentage of sets won (head-to-head records if two teams remain tied), then (b) percentage of games won (head-to-head records if two teams remain tied), then (c) Davis Cup rankings.

=== Pool B ===
		SGP	OMA	MGL	TJK	BAN	IRQ	RR; W–L	Set; W–L	Game; W–L	Standings
107	Singapore		1–2	3–0	3–0	3–0	3–0	4–1	27–5 (84%)	189–83 (69%)	1
122	Oman	2–1		1–2	3–0	3–0	3–0	4–1	25–9 (74%)	178–122 (59%)	2
124	Mongolia	0–3	2–1		2–1	2–1	2–1	4–1	17–15 (53%)	145–124 (54%)	3
123	Tajikistan	0–3	0–3	1–2		2–1	1–2	1–4	11–22 (33%)	124–170 (42%)	4
112	Bangladesh	0–3	0–3	1–2	1–2		2–1	1–4	9–23 (28%)	102–168 (38%)	5
106	Iraq	0–3	0–3	1–2	2–1	1–2		1–4	9–24 (27%)	117–182 (39%)	6

Standings are determined by: 1. number of wins; 2. number of matches; 3. in two-team ties, head-to-head records; 4. in three-team ties, (a) percentage of sets won (head-to-head records if two teams remain tied), then (b) percentage of games won (head-to-head records if two teams remain tied), then (c) Davis Cup rankings.

=== Playoffs ===
Placing	A Team	Score	B Team
Promotional	Cambodia	2–0	Oman
Promotional	Saudi Arabia	2–1	Singapore
5th–6th	Myanmar	2–1	Mongolia
7th–8th	Bahrain	1–2	Tajikistan
9th–10th	Kyrgyzstan	2–1	Bangladesh
11th	—N/a		Iraq

Cambodia and Saudi Arabia promoted to Group III in 2018.

== Round robin ==
=== Pool A ===
==== Cambodia vs. Myanmar ====
Cambodia
3
Bahrain Polytechnic, Isa Town, Bahrain
3 April 2017
Hard

Myanmar
0

			1	2	3
1	(Cambodia) (Myanmar)	Mam Phalkun; Tin Myo Wai	6; 1	7; 5
2	(Cambodia) (Myanmar)	Long Samneang; Aung Kyaw Naing	4; 6	6; 3	6; 2
3	(Cambodia) (Myanmar)	Bun Kenny / Our Sarith; Aung Kyaw Naing / Phyo Min Thar	6; 2	6; 1

==== Bahrain vs. Saudi Arabia ====
Bahrain
0
Bahrain Polytechnic, Isa Town, Bahrain
3 April 2017
Hard

Saudi Arabia
3

			1	2	3
1	(Bahrain) (Saudi Arabia)	Hasan Abdulnabi; Fahad Al Saad	2; 6	6; 2	3; 6
2	(Bahrain) (Saudi Arabia)	Yusuf Qaed; Ammar Alhaqbani	0; 6	2; 6
3	(Bahrain) (Saudi Arabia)	Abdulkarim Abdulnabi / Hasan Abdulnabi; Ammar Alhaqbani / Saud Alhaqbani	3; 6	3; 6

==== Cambodia vs. Kyrgyzstan ====
Cambodia
2
Bahrain Polytechnic, Isa Town, Bahrain
4 April 2017
Hard

Kyrgyzstan
1

			1	2	3
1	(Cambodia) (Kyrgyzstan)	Mam Phalkun; Farhad Urumbaev	6; 2	6; 1
2	(Cambodia) (Kyrgyzstan)	Our Sarith; Evgeniy Babak	5; 7	2; 6
3	(Cambodia) (Kyrgyzstan)	Bun Kenny / Mam Phalkun; Evgeniy Babak / Denis Surotin	3; 6	6; 2	6; 2

==== Bahrain vs. Myanmar ====
Bahrain
1
Bahrain Polytechnic, Isa Town, Bahrain
4 April 2017
Hard

Myanmar
2

			1	2	3
1	(Bahrain) (Myanmar)	Elyas Abdulnabi; Tin Myo Wai	2; 6	5; 7
2	(Bahrain) (Myanmar)	Hasan Abdulnabi; Aung Kyaw Naing	6; 3	6; 2
3	(Bahrain) (Myanmar)	Abdulkarim Abdulnabi / Hasan Abdulnabi; Aung Kyaw Naing / Phyo Min Thar	6; 1	3; 6	4; 6

==== Cambodia vs. Bahrain ====
Cambodia
3
Bahrain Polytechnic, Isa Town, Bahrain
5 April 2017
Hard

Bahrain
0

			1	2	3
1	(Cambodia) (Bahrain)	Long Samneang; Hasan Abdulnabi	6; 4	6^{4} 7^{7}	6; 2
2	(Cambodia) (Bahrain)	Bun Kenny; Yusuf Qaed	6; 0	6; 2
3	(Cambodia) (Bahrain)	Mam Phalkun / Our Sarith; Abdulkarim Abdulnabi / Elyas Abdulnabi	6; 3	4; 6	6; 4

==== Saudi Arabia vs. Kyrgyzstan ====
Saudi Arabia
3
Bahrain Polytechnic, Isa Town, Bahrain
5 April 2017
Hard

Kyrgyzstan
0

			1	2	3
1	(Saudi Arabia) (Kyrgyzstan)	Faisal Al Rebdi; Denis Surotin	6; 1	6; 3
2	(Saudi Arabia) (Kyrgyzstan)	Ammar Alhaqbani; Evgeniy Babak	6; 2	4; 6	6; 4
3	(Saudi Arabia) (Kyrgyzstan)	Fahad Al Saad / Saud Alhaqbani; Denis Surotin / Farhad Urumbaev	6; 3	6; 1

==== Bahrain vs. Kyrgyzstan ====
Bahrain
3
Bahrain Polytechnic, Isa Town, Bahrain
6 April 2017
Hard

Kyrgyzstan
0

			1	2	3
1	(Bahrain) (Kyrgyzstan)	Hasan Abdulnabi; Farhad Urumbaev	6; 2	6; 0
2	(Bahrain) (Kyrgyzstan)	Yusuf Qaed; Evgeniy Babak	7^{8} 6^{6}	6^{5} 7^{7}	6; 4
3	(Bahrain) (Kyrgyzstan)	Abdulkarim Abdulnabi / Elyas Abdulnabi; Denis Surotin / Farhad Urumbaev	6; 2	7; 5

==== Saudi Arabia vs. Myanmar ====
Saudi Arabia
3
Bahrain Polytechnic, Isa Town, Bahrain
6 April 2017
Hard

Myanmar
0

			1	2	3
1	(Saudi Arabia) (Myanmar)	Ammar Alhaqbani; Tin Myo Wai	6; 4	6; 0
2	(Saudi Arabia) (Myanmar)	Saud Alhaqbani; Aung Kyaw Naing	6; 3	7; 5
3	(Saudi Arabia) (Myanmar)	Faisal Al Rebdi / Fahad Al Saad; Aung Myo Thant / Phyo Min Thar	6; 4	4; 6	6; 1

==== Cambodia vs. Saudi Arabia ====
Cambodia
2
Bahrain Polytechnic, Isa Town, Bahrain
7 April 2017
Hard

Saudi Arabia
1

			1	2	3
1	(Cambodia) (Saudi Arabia)	Our Sarith; Ammar Alhaqbani	4; 6	1; 6
2	(Cambodia) (Saudi Arabia)	Long Samneang; Saud Alhaqbani	6; 1	6; 0
3	(Cambodia) (Saudi Arabia)	Bun Kenny / Mam Phalkun; Fahad Al Saad / Ammar Alhaqbani	6; 4	6; 1

==== Myanmar vs. Kyrgyzstan ====
Myanmar
2
Bahrain Polytechnic, Isa Town, Bahrain
7 April 2017
Hard

Kyrgyzstan
1

			1	2	3
1	(Myanmar) (Kyrgyzstan)	Tin Myo Wai; Denis Surotin	6; 2	7; 5
2	(Myanmar) (Kyrgyzstan)	Aung Kyaw Naing; Evgeniy Babak	5; 7	2; 6
3	(Myanmar) (Kyrgyzstan)	Phyo Min Thar / Tin Myo Wai; Evgeniy Babak / Denis Surotin	6; 2	6; 4

=== Pool B ===
==== Iraq vs. Mongolia ====
Iraq
1
Bahrain Polytechnic, Isa Town, Bahrain
3 April 2017
Hard

Mongolia
2

			1	2	3
1	(Iraq) (Mongolia)	Ali Khairi Hasim Al Mayahi; Munkhbaatar Badrakh	2; 6	2; 6
2	(Iraq) (Mongolia)	Akram M. Abdalkarem Al-Saady; Duurenbayar Erdenebayar	7^{7} 6^{4}	4; 6	7; 5
3	(Iraq) (Mongolia)	Ali Kahiri Hasim Al Mayahi / Akram M. Abdalkarem Al-Saady; Munkhbaatar Badrakh / Duurenbayar Erdenebayar	2; 6	1; 6

==== Singapore vs. Tajikistan ====
Singapore
3
Bahrain Polytechnic, Isa Town, Bahrain
3 April 2017
Hard

Tajikistan
0

			1	2	3
1	(Singapore) (Tajikistan)	Roy Hobbs; Sergey Makashin	6; 3	6; 1
2	(Singapore) (Tajikistan)	Shaheed Alam; Mirkhusein Yakhyaev	6; 2	6; 0
3	(Singapore) (Tajikistan)	Roy Hobbs / Ng Hao-yuan; Sergey Makashin / Mirkhusein Yakhyaev	6; 2	6; 2

==== Bangladesh vs. Oman ====
Bangladesh
0
Bahrain Polytechnic, Isa Town, Bahrain
3 April 2017
Hard

Oman
3

			1	2	3
1	(Bangladesh) (Oman)	Sree-Amol Roy; Mohammed Al Nabhani	1; 6	3; 6
2	(Bangladesh) (Oman)	Mamun Bapari; Abdullah Al Barwani	3; 6	4; 6
3	(Bangladesh) (Oman)	Faruk Hossain / Md Juel Rana; Abdullah Al Barwani / Mohammed Al Nabhani	0; 6	2; 6

==== Iraq vs. Tajikistan ====
Iraq
2
Bahrain Polytechnic, Isa Town, Bahrain
4 April 2017
Hard

Tajikistan
1

			1	2	3
1	(Iraq) (Tajikistan)	Ali Khairi Hashim Al Mayahi; Sergey Makashin	2; 6	6; 3	7^{7} 6^{3}
2	(Iraq) (Tajikistan)	Akram M. Abdalkarem Al-Saady; Mirkhusein Yakhyaev	6; 4	7; 5
3	(Iraq) (Tajikistan)	Adel Mustafa Al-Saedi / Barakat Zainy; Sergey Makashin / Mansur Yakhyaev	4; 6	6^{5} 7^{7}

==== Singapore vs. Oman ====
Singapore
1
Bahrain Polytechnic, Isa Town, Bahrain
4 April 2017
Hard

Oman
2

			1	2	3
1	(Singapore) (Oman)	Ng Hao-yuan; Mohammed Al Nabhani	5; 7	3; 6
2	(Singapore) (Oman)	Shaheed Alam; Abdullah Al Barwani	7^{7} 6^{5}	6^{4} 7^{7}	5; 7
3	(Singapore) (Oman)	Roy Hobbs / Ng Hao-yuan; Mohammed Al Nabhani / Younis Al Rawahi	6; 0	6; 3

==== Bangladesh vs. Mongolia ====
Bangladesh
1
Bahrain Polytechnic, Isa Town, Bahrain
4 April 2017
Hard

Mongolia
2

			1	2	3
1	(Bangladesh) (Mongolia)	Md Juel Rana; Munkhbaatar Badrakh	1; 6	0; 6
2	(Bangladesh) (Mongolia)	Mamun Bapari; Duurenbayar Erdenebayar	0; 6	0; 6
3	(Bangladesh) (Mongolia)	Faruk Hossain / Sree-Amol Roy; Ankhsaikhan Temuugei / Orgil Tsogt	6; 4	6; 1

==== Iraq vs. Oman ====
Iraq
0
Bahrain Polytechnic, Isa Town, Bahrain
5 April 2017
Hard

Oman
3

			1	2	3
1	(Iraq) (Oman)	Barakat Zainy; Mohammed Al Nabhani	1; 6	2; 6
2	(Iraq) (Oman)	Adel Mustafa Al-Saedi; Abdullah Al Barwani	2; 6	4; 6
3	(Iraq) (Oman)	Adel Mustafa Al-Saedi / Barakat Zainy; Abdullah Al Barwani / Mohammed Al Nabhani	4; 6	2; 6

==== Singapore vs. Bangladesh ====
Singapore
3
Bahrain Polytechnic, Isa Town, Bahrain
5 April 2017
Hard

Bangladesh
0

			1	2	3
1	(Singapore) (Bangladesh)	Ng Hao-yuan; Faruk Hossain	6; 1	6^{8} 7^{10}	7^{7} 6^{0}
2	(Singapore) (Bangladesh)	Roy Hobbs; Md Juel Rana	6; 0	6; 0
3	(Singapore) (Bangladesh)	Shaheed Alam / Ng Hao-yuan; Mamun Bapari / Sree-Amol Roy	6; 1	6; 3

==== Tajikistan vs. Mongolia ====
Tajikistan
1
Bahrain Polytechnic, Isa Town, Bahrain
5 April 2017
Hard

Mongolia
2

			1	2	3
1	(Tajikistan) (Mongolia)	Sergey Makashin; Munkhbaatar Badrakh	0; 6	4; 6
2	(Tajikistan) (Mongolia)	Mirkhusein Yakhyaev; Duurenbayar Erdenebayar	6; 4	6; 4
3	(Tajikistan) (Mongolia)	Mansur Yakhyaev / Mirkhusein Yakhyaev; Munkhbaatar Badrakh / Duurenbayar Erdenebayar	4; 6	2; 6

==== Iraq vs. Bangladesh ====
Iraq
1
Bahrain Polytechnic, Isa Town, Bahrain
6 April 2017
Hard

Bangladesh
2

			1	2	3
1	(Iraq) (Bangladesh)	Ali Khairi Hashim Al Mayahi; Faruk Hossain	6; 1	6; 1
2	(Iraq) (Bangladesh)	Akram M. Abdalkarem Al-Saady; Sree-Amol Roy	3; 6	4; 6
3	(Iraq) (Bangladesh)	Ali Khairi Hashim Al Mayahi / Akram M. Abdalkarem Al-Saady; Mamun Bapari / Sree-Amol Roy	6; 4	3; 6	4; 6

==== Singapore vs. Mongolia ====
Singapore
3
Bahrain Polytechnic, Isa Town, Bahrain
6 April 2017
Hard

Mongolia
0

			1	2	3
1	(Singapore) (Mongolia)	Roy Hobbs; Munkhbaatar Badrakh	6; 4	6; 3
2	(Singapore) (Mongolia)	Shaheed Alam; Duurenbayar Erdenebayar	6; 0	6; 1
3	(Singapore) (Mongolia)	Roy Hobbs / Ng Hao-yuan; Ankhsaikhan Temuugei / Orgil Tsogt	6; 2	6; 2

==== Oman vs. Tajikistan ====
Oman
3
Bahrain Polytechnic, Isa Town, Bahrain
6 April 2017
Hard

Tajikistan
0

			1	2	3
1	(Oman) (Tajikistan)	Mohammed Al Nabhani; Mansur Yakhyaev	6; 0	6; 0
2	(Oman) (Tajikistan)	Abdullah Al Barwani; Mirkhusein Yakhyaev	7; 5	3; 6	6; 2
3	(Oman) (Tajikistan)	Abdullah Al Barwani / Mohammed Al Nabhani; Sergey Makashin / Mansur Yakhyaev	2; 6	6; 3	6; 3

==== Iraq vs. Singapore ====
Iraq
0
Bahrain Polytechnic, Isa Town, Bahrain
7 April 2017
Hard

Singapore
3

			1	2	3
1	(Iraq) (Singapore)	Barakat Zainy; Ng Hao-yuan	1; 6	2; 6
2	(Iraq) (Singapore)	Adel Mustafa Al-Saedi; Shaheed Alam	1; 6	2; 6
3	(Iraq) (Singapore)	Adel Mustafa Al-Saedi / Barakat Zainy; Roy Hobbs / Joshua Liu	1; 6	0; 1		retired

==== Bangladesh vs. Tajikistan ====
Bangladesh
1
Bahrain Polytechnic, Isa Town, Bahrain
7 April 2017
Hard

Tajikistan
2

			1	2	3
1	(Bangladesh) (Tajikistan)	Faruk Hossain; Sergey Makashin	1; 6	3; 6
2	(Bangladesh) (Tajikistan)	Sree-Amol Roy; Mirkhusein Yakhyaev	6; 2	3; 1		retired
3	(Bangladesh) (Tajikistan)	Mamun Bapari / Sree-Amol Roy; Sergey Makashin / Mirkhusein Yakhyaev	6^{2} 7^{7}	0; 6

==== Oman vs. Mongolia ====
Oman
1
Bahrain Polytechnic, Isa Town, Bahrain
7 April 2017
Hard

Mongolia
2

			1	2	3
1	(Oman) (Mongolia)	Zakariya Alsuleimani; Munkhbaatar Badrakh	0; 6	0; 6
2	(Oman) (Mongolia)	Abdullah Al Barwani; Ankhsaikhan Temuugei	6; 1	6; 2
3	(Oman) (Mongolia)	Abdullah Al Barwani / Younis Al Rawahi; Munkhbaatar Badrakh / Duurenbayar Erdenebayar	6^{2} 7^{7}	6; 3	4; 6

== Playoffs ==
=== Promotional playoffs ===
==== Cambodia vs. Oman ====
Cambodia
2
Bahrain Polytechnic, Isa Town, Bahrain
8 April 2017
Hard

Oman
0

			1	2	3
1	(Cambodia) (Oman)	Long Samneang; Mohammed Al Nabhani	3; 6	6; 2	6; 4
2	(Cambodia) (Oman)	Bun Kenny; Abdullah Al Barwani	6; 2	6; 1
3	(Cambodia) (Oman)	Bun Kenny / Mam Phalkun; Abdullah Al Barwani / Mohammed Al Nabhani				not played

==== Singapore vs. Saudi Arabia ====
Singapore
1
Bahrain Polytechnic, Isa Town, Bahrain
8 April 2017
Hard

Saudi Arabia
2

			1	2	3
1	(Singapore) (Saudi Arabia)	Roy Hobbs; Fahad Al Saad	6; 0	6; 2
2	(Singapore) (Saudi Arabia)	Shaheed Alam; Ammar Alhaqbani	6; 4	4; 6	3; 6
3	(Singapore) (Saudi Arabia)	Roy Hobbs / Ng Hao-yuan; Fahad Al Saad / Ammar Alhaqbani	3; 6	3; 6

=== 5th place playoff ===
==== Myanmar vs. Mongolia ====
Myanmar
2
Bahrain Polytechnic, Isa Town, Bahrain
8 April 2017
Hard

Mongolia
1

			1	2	3
1	(Myanmar) (Mongolia)	Aung Myo Thant; Munkhbaatar Badrakh	4; 6	2; 6
2	(Myanmar) (Mongolia)	Tin Myo Wai; Orgil Tsogt	6; 0	6; 0
3	(Myanmar) (Mongolia)	Aung Kyaw Naing / Phyo Min Thar; Munkhbaatar Badrakh / Ankhsaikhan Temuugei	6^{3} 7^{7}	6; 3	6; 4

=== 7th place playoff ===
==== Bahrain vs. Tajikistan ====
Bahrain
1
Bahrain Polytechnic, Isa Town, Bahrain
8 April 2017
Hard

Tajikistan
2

			1	2	3
1	(Bahrain) (Tajikistan)	Hasan Abdulnabi; Sergey Makashin	6; 4	6; 3
2	(Bahrain) (Tajikistan)	Yusuf Qaed; Mirkhusein Yakhyaev	6^{4} 7^{7}	1; 6
3	(Bahrain) (Tajikistan)	Abdulkarim Abdulnabi / Hasan Abdulnabi; Sergey Makashin / Mansur Yakhyaev	6; 3	5; 7	3; 6

=== 9th place playoff ===
==== Bangladesh vs. Kyrgyzstan ====
Bangladesh
1
Bahrain Polytechnic, Isa Town, Bahrain
8 April 2017
Hard

Kyrgyzstan
2

			1	2	3
1	(Bangladesh) (Kyrgyzstan)	Faruk Hossain; Farhad Urumbaev	6; 3	4; 6	3; 6
2	(Bangladesh) (Kyrgyzstan)	Md Juel Rana; Evgeniy Babak	2; 6	1; 6
3	(Bangladesh) (Kyrgyzstan)	Faruk Hossain / Md Juel Rana; Evgeniy Babak / Farhad Urumbaev	5; 7	7; 5	0; 0	retired
