= 2015 Davis Cup Asia/Oceania Zone Group IV =

International tennis competition

The Asia/Oceania Zone was one of the three zones of regional Davis Cup competition in 2015.

In the Asia/Oceania Zone there were four different groups in which teams competed against each other to advance to the next group.

== Teams ==
=== Group A ===
- Bahrain
- Iraq
- Jordan
- Pacific Oceania (promoted to group III)

=== Group B ===
- Bangladesh
- Kyrgyzstan
- Oman
- Singapore (promoted to group III)
- United Arab Emirates

== Format ==
The nine teams were split into two round robin pools, with the winning nation from each pool playing against the runner-up from the other pool in promotion play-off matches. The winning teams from these matches were promoted to Group III in 2016.

The ties were played on the week commencing 27 April 2015 at Bahrain Tennis Federation, Isa Town, Bahrain and were played on outdoor hard courts.

== Groups ==
=== Group A ===
	Pacific Oceania	Jordan	Bahrain	Iraq	RR W–L	Matches W–L	Sets W–L	Games W–L	Standings
Pacific Oceania		2–1	3–0	2–1	3–0	7–2	15–8	122–90	1
Jordan	1–2		2–1	2–1	2–1	5–4	13–10	114–109	2
Bahrain	0–3	1–2		2–1	1–2	3–6	8–13	94–117	3
Iraq	1–2	1–2	1–2		0–3	3–6	8–13	95–109	4

==== Pacific Oceania vs. Iraq ====
Pacific Oceania
2
Bahrain Tennis Federation, Isa Town, Bahrain
27 April 2015
Hard

Iraq
1

			1	2	3
1	(Pacific Oceania) (Iraq)	Cyril Jacobe; Akram M Abdalkarem Al-Saadi	5; 7	2; 6
2	(Pacific Oceania) (Iraq)	Heve Kelley; Ali Khairi Hashim Al Mayahi	6; 2	6; 2
3	(Pacific Oceania) (Iraq)	Brett Baudinet / Daniel Llarenas; Ali Khairi Hashim Al Mayahi / Akram M Abdalkarem Al-Saadi	6; 3	3; 6	6; 4

==== Jordan vs. Bahrain ====
Jordan
2
Bahrain Tennis Federation, Isa Town, Bahrain
27 April 2015
Hard

Bahrain
1

			1	2	3
1	(Jordan) (Bahrain)	Mousa Alkotop; Yusuf Qaed	6; 3	6; 0
2	(Jordan) (Bahrain)	Seif Adas; Hasan Abdulnabi	6; 4	6; 3
3	(Jordan) (Bahrain)	Seif Adas / Mousa Alkotop; Abdulkarim Abdulnabi / Hasan Abdulnabi	6^{4} 7^{7}	7^{9} 6^{7}	6^{3} 7^{7}

==== Pacific Oceania vs. Bahrain ====
Pacific Oceania
3
Bahrain Tennis Federation, Isa Town, Bahrain
28 April 2015
Hard

Bahrain
0

			1	2	3
1	(Pacific Oceania) (Bahrain)	Cyril Jacobe; Abdulkarim Abdulnabi	2; 6	6; 3	6; 3
2	(Pacific Oceania) (Bahrain)	Heve Kelley; Yusuf Qaed	6^{6} 7^{8}	6; 4	6; 2
3	(Pacific Oceania) (Bahrain)	Brett Baudinet / Daniel Llarenas; Hasan Abdulnabi / Yusuf Qaed	6; 2	7^{7} 6^{2}

==== Jordan vs. Iraq ====
Jordan
2
Bahrain Tennis Federation, Isa Town, Bahrain
29 April 2015
Hard

Iraq
1

			1	2	3
1	(Jordan) (Iraq)	Seif Adas; Akram M Abdalkarem Al-Saadi	2; 6	7; 5	6; 3
2	(Jordan) (Iraq)	Ahmed Ibrahim Ahmad Alhadid; Ali Khairi Hashim Al Mayahi	4; 6	6; 1	6^{1} 7^{7}
3	(Jordan) (Iraq)	Seif Adas / Mousa Alkotop; Ali Khairi Hashim Al Mayahi / Akram M Abdalkarem Al-Saadi	7^{7} 6^{1}	6; 2

==== Pacific Oceania vs. Jordan ====
Pacific Oceania
2
Bahrain Tennis Federation, Isa Town, Bahrain
30 April 2015
Hard

Jordan
1

			1	2	3
1	(Pacific Oceania) (Jordan)	Cyril Jacobe; Mousa Alkotop	3; 6	6; 2	6; 3
2	(Pacific Oceania) (Jordan)	Heve Kelley; Seif Adas	6^{4} 7^{7}	6; 0	4; 6
3	(Pacific Oceania) (Jordan)	Brett Baudinet / Daniel Llarenas; Mousa Alkotop / Tareq Talal Shkakwa	6; 1	6; 2

==== Iraq vs. Bahrain ====
Iraq
1
Bahrain Tennis Federation, Isa Town, Bahrain
1 May 2015
Hard

Bahrain
2

			1	2	3
1	(Iraq) (Bahrain)	Akram M Abdalkarem Al-Saadi; Ali Dawani	6; 2	6; 3
2	(Iraq) (Bahrain)	Ali Khairi Hashim Al Mayahi; Yusuf Qaed	2; 6	5; 7
3	(Iraq) (Bahrain)	Ali Khairi Hashim Al Mayahi / Akram M Abdalkarem Al-Saadi; Abdulkarim Abdulnabi / Yusuf Qaed	4; 6	6^{4} 7^{7}

=== Group B ===
	Singapore	United Arab Emirates	Bangladesh	Oman	Kyrgyzstan	RR W–L	Matches W–L	Sets W–L	Games W–L	Standings
Singapore		2–1	3–0	3–0	3–0	4–0	11–1	23–3	153–63	1
United Arab Emirates	1–2		3–0	3–0	3–0	3–1	10–2	21–7	156–83	2
Bangladesh	0–3	0–3		3–0	3–0	2–2	6–6	13–12	111–91	3
Oman	0–3	0–3	0–3		3–0	1–3	3–9	7–18	70–125	4
Kyrgyzstan	0–3	0–3	0–3	0–3		0–4	0–12	0–24	17–145	5

==== United Arab Emirates vs. Kyrgyzstan ====
United Arab Emirates
3
Bahrain Tennis Federation, Isa Town, Bahrain
27 April 2015
Hard

Kyrgyzstan
0

			1	2	3
1	(United Arab Emirates) (Kyrgyzstan)	Mahmoud Nader Al Blooshi; Emir Tenizbaev	6; 0	6; 0
2	(United Arab Emirates) (Kyrgyzstan)	Omar Alawadhi; Namazbek Diushembiev	6; 0	6; 0
3	(United Arab Emirates) (Kyrgyzstan)	Abdulla Ahmad Ahli / Omar Alawadhi; Erbol Kanatbek / Ibragim Karimberdiev	6; 0	6; 0

==== Bangladesh vs. Singapore ====
Bangladesh
0
Bahrain Tennis Federation, Isa Town, Bahrain
27 April 2015
Hard

Singapore
3

			1	2	3
1	(Bangladesh) (Singapore)	Sree-Amol Roy; Yong Jie Isaac Ong	5; 7	0; 6
2	(Bangladesh) (Singapore)	Shibu Lal; Roy Hobbs	3; 6	3; 6
3	(Bangladesh) (Singapore)	Ranjan Ram / Sree Biplob Ram; Shaheed Alam / Sherwin Foo	1; 6	3; 6

==== United Arab Emirates vs. Bangladesh ====
United Arab Emirates
3
Bahrain Tennis Federation, Isa Town, Bahrain
28 April 2015
Hard

Bangladesh
0

			1	2	3
1	(United Arab Emirates) (Bangladesh)	Mahmoud Nader Al Blooshi; Sree-Amol Roy	5; 7	6; 1	7^{7} 6^{5}
2	(United Arab Emirates) (Bangladesh)	Omar Alawadhi; Shibu Lal	6; 3	6; 2
3	(United Arab Emirates) (Bangladesh)	Abdulla Ahmad Ahli / Omar Alawadhi; Shibu Lal / Ranjan Ram	6; 2	6; 3

==== Singapore vs. Oman ====
Singapore
3
Bahrain Tennis Federation, Isa Town, Bahrain
28 April 2015
Hard

Oman
0

			1	2	3
1	(Singapore) (Oman)	Yong Jie Isaac Ong; Younis Al Rawahi	6; 0	6; 1
2	(Singapore) (Oman)	Roy Hobbs; Fawaz Mandhry	6; 0	6; 2
3	(Singapore) (Oman)	Shaheed Alam / Sherwin Foo; Omran Al Balushi / Ahmed Al Barwani	6; 0	6; 4

==== United Arab Emirates vs. Oman ====
United Arab Emirates
3
Bahrain Tennis Federation, Isa Town, Bahrain
29 April 2015
Hard

Oman
0

			1	2	3
1	(United Arab Emirates) (Oman)	Mahmoud Nader Al Blooshi; Younis Al Rawahi	6; 0	6; 2
2	(United Arab Emirates) (Oman)	Omar Alawadhi; Fawaz Mandhry	6; 1	6; 1
3	(United Arab Emirates) (Oman)	Abdulla Ahmad Ahli / Fares Al Janahi; Omran Al Balushi / Ahmed Al Barwani	6; 2	5; 7	6; 2

==== Bangladesh vs. Kyrgyzstan ====
Bangladesh
3
Bahrain Tennis Federation, Isa Town, Bahrain
29 April 2015
Hard

Kyrgyzstan
0

			1	2	3
1	(Bangladesh) (Kyrgyzstan)	Sree Biplob Ram; Ibragim Karimberdiev	6; 1	6; 0
2	(Bangladesh) (Kyrgyzstan)	Shibu Lal; Namazbek Diushembiev	6; 0	6; 0
3	(Bangladesh) (Kyrgyzstan)	Shibu Lal / Ranjan Ram; Ibragim Karimberdiev / Emir Tenizbaev	6; 0	6; 0

==== United Arab Emirates vs. Singapore ====
United Arab Emirates
1
Bahrain Tennis Federation, Isa Town, Bahrain
30 April 2015
Hard

Singapore
2

			1	2	3
1	(United Arab Emirates) (Singapore)	Fares Al Janahi; Yong Jie Isaac Ong	1; 6	6^{5} 7^{7}
2	(United Arab Emirates) (Singapore)	Omar Alawadhi; Roy Hobbs	4; 6	6; 3	6; 4
3	(United Arab Emirates) (Singapore)	Omar Alawadhi / Mahmoud Nader Al Blooshi; Roy Hobbs / Yong Jie Isaac Ong	5; 7	7; 5	2; 6

==== Oman vs. Kyrgyzstan ====
Oman
3
Bahrain Tennis Federation, Isa Town, Bahrain
30 April 2015
Hard

Kyrgyzstan
0

			1	2	3
1	(Oman) (Kyrgyzstan)	Omran Al Balushi; Ibragim Karimberdiev	6; 0	6; 1
2	(Oman) (Kyrgyzstan)	Younis Al Rawahi; Namazbek Diushembiev	7; 5	6; 2
3	(Oman) (Kyrgyzstan)	Ahmed Al Barwani / Fawaz Mandhry; Ibragim Karimberdiev / Emir Tenizbaev	6; 2	6; 2

==== Bangladesh vs. Oman ====
Bangladesh
3
Bahrain Tennis Federation, Isa Town, Bahrain
1 May 2015
Hard

Oman
0

			1	2	3
1	(Bangladesh) (Oman)	Sree Biplob Ram; Omran Al Balushi	6; 2	6; 3
2	(Bangladesh) (Oman)	Shibu Lal; Younis Al Rawahi	6; 4	6; 0
3	(Bangladesh) (Oman)	Shibu Lal / Ranjan Ram; Omran Al Balushi / Ahmed Al Barwani	6; 1	6; 1

==== Singapore vs. Kyrgyzstan ====
Singapore
3
Bahrain Tennis Federation, Isa Town, Bahrain
1 May 2015
Hard

Kyrgyzstan
0

			1	2	3
1	(Singapore) (Kyrgyzstan)	Sherwin Foo; Emir Tenizbaev	6; 1	6; 0
2	(Singapore) (Kyrgyzstan)	Shaheed Alam; Namazbek Diushembiev	6; 0	6; 1
3	(Singapore) (Kyrgyzstan)	Shaheed Alam / Sherwin Foo; Namazbek Diushembiev / Ibragim Karimberdiev	6; 2	6; 0

== Play-offs ==
=== 1st to 4th play-off ===
==== Pacific Oceania vs. United Arab Emirates ====
Pacific Oceania
2
Bahrain Tennis Federation, Isa Town, Bahrain
2 May 2015
Hard

United Arab Emirates
1

			1	2	3
1	(Pacific Oceania) (United Arab Emirates)	Cyril Jacobe; Mahmoud Nader Al Blooshi	6; 4	3; 6	6; 4
2	(Pacific Oceania) (United Arab Emirates)	Heve Kelley; Omar Alawadhi	0; 6	4; 6
3	(Pacific Oceania) (United Arab Emirates)	Brett Baudinet / Daniel Llarenas; Omar Alawadhi / Mahmoud Nader Al Blooshi	7^{8} 6^{6}	7; 5

==== Singapore vs. Jordan ====
Singapore
2
Bahrain Tennis Federation, Isa Town, Bahrain
2 May 2015
Hard

Jordan
0

			1	2	3
1	(Singapore) (Jordan)	Yong Jie Isaac Ong; Mousa Alkotop	3; 6	6; 3	7^{7} 6^{2}
2	(Singapore) (Jordan)	Roy Hobbs; Seif Adas	6; 4	6; 3
3	(Singapore) (Jordan)	Shaheed Alam / Sherwin Foo; Seif Adas / Mousa Alkotop

=== 5th to 6th play-off ===
==== Bahrain vs. Bangladesh ====
Bahrain
1
Bahrain Tennis Federation, Isa Town, Bahrain
2 May 2015
Hard

Bangladesh
2

			1	2	3
1	(Bahrain) (Bangladesh)	Ali Dawani; Sree Biplob Ram	6; 3	6; 2
2	(Bahrain) (Bangladesh)	Yusuf Qaed; Shibu Lal	0; 6	0; 6
3	(Bahrain) (Bangladesh)	Abdulkarim Abdulnabi / Yusuf Qaed; Shibu Lal / Ranjan Ram	5; 7	3; 6

=== 7th to 8th play-off ===
==== Iraq vs. Oman ====
Iraq
2
Bahrain Tennis Federation, Isa Town, Bahrain
2 May 2015
Hard

Oman
1

			1	2	3
1	(Iraq) (Oman)	Ali Khairi Hashim Al Mayahi; Omran Al Balushi	6; 1	6; 2
2	(Iraq) (Oman)	Kareem Khairi Hashim Al Mayahi; Younis Al Rawahi	1; 6	3; 6
3	(Iraq) (Oman)	Ali Khairi Hashim Al Mayahi / Akram M Abdalkarem Al-Saadi; Ahmed Al Barwani / Younis Al Rawahi	6; 2	6; 3
