= 2007 Davis Cup Asia/Oceania Zone Group IV =

International tennis competition

The Asian and Oceanian Zone is one of the three zones of regional Davis Cup competition in 2007.

In the Asian and Oceanian Zone there are four different groups in which teams compete against each other to advance to the next group.

The Group IV tournament was held May 9–13, in Theinbyu Tennis Plaza, Yangon, Myanmar, on outdoor hard courts.

== Format ==
There will be a Round Robin where the ten teams will compete in two pools. The winner of each pool will be promoted to the Asia and Oceania Group III in 2008.

== Pool A ==
	Pool A	TJK	BAN	TKM	JOR	BRN
1	Tajikistan (4–0)		3–0	3–0	2–1	2–1
2	Bangladesh (3–1)	0–3		2–1	3–0	3–0
3	Turkmenistan (2–2)	0–3	1–2		2–1	2–1
4	Jordan (1–3)	1–2	0–3	1–2		2–1
5	Bahrain (0–4)	1–2	0–3	1–2	1–2	

- Tajikistan advances to Asia/Oceania Group III in 2008.

=== Tajikistan vs. Turkmenistan ===
Tajikistan
3
Theinbyu Tennis Plaza, Yangon, Myanmar
9 May 2007
Hard

Turkmenistan
0

			1	2	3
1	(Tajikistan) (Turkmenistan)	Sergey Makashin; Myalikkuli Mamedkuliyev	6; 2	7^{7} 6^{2}
2	(Tajikistan) (Turkmenistan)	Dilshod Sharifi; Dovran Chagylov	6; 1	6; 2
3	(Tajikistan) (Turkmenistan)	Mansur Yakhyaev / Mirkhusein Yakhyaev; Eziz Dovletov / Evgeniy Jirnov	6; 2	6; 2

=== Bangladesh vs. Jordan ===
Bangladesh
3
Theinbyu Tennis Plaza, Yangon, Myanmar
9 May 2007
Hard

Jordan
0

			1	2	3
1	(Bangladesh) (Jordan)	Ranjan Ram; Fabio Badra	4; 6	6; 4	6; 3
2	(Bangladesh) (Jordan)	Sree-Amol Roy; Tareq Talal Shkakwa	6; 2	6; 4
3	(Bangladesh) (Jordan)	Mazharul-Pimon Islam / Henry Prithul Mondol; Ahmad Adas / Sari Alotaibi	6; 2	6; 3

=== Bahrain vs. Turkmenistan ===
Bahrain
1
Theinbyu Tennis Plaza, Yangon, Myanmar
10 May 2007
Hard

Turkmenistan
2

			1	2	3
1	(Bahrain) (Turkmenistan)	Khaled Al Thawadi; Eziz Dovletov	6; 0	6; 4
2	(Bahrain) (Turkmenistan)	Abdulkarim Abdulnabi; Myalikkuli Mamedkuliyev	5; 7	3; 6
3	(Bahrain) (Turkmenistan)	Khaled Al Thawadi / Hasan Abdulnabi; Dovran Chagylov / Myalikkuli Mamedkuliyev	7^{12} 6^{10}	4; 6	0; 6

=== Tajikistan vs. Jordan ===
Tajikistan
2
Theinbyu Tennis Plaza, Yangon, Myanmar
10 May 2007
Hard

Jordan
1

			1	2	3
1	(Tajikistan) (Jordan)	Sergey Makashin; Fabio Badra	3; 6	2; 6
2	(Tajikistan) (Jordan)	Dilshod Sharifi; Tareq Talal Shkakwa	6; 3	6; 1
3	(Tajikistan) (Jordan)	Dilshod Sharifi / Mansur Yakhyaev; Fabio Badra / Tareq Talal Shkakwa	6; 3	6; 4

=== Bahrain vs. Bangladesh ===
Bahrain
0
Theinbyu Tennis Plaza, Yangon, Myanmar
11 May 2007
Hard

Bangladesh
3

			1	2	3
1	(Bahrain) (Bangladesh)	Khaled Al Thawadi; Ranjan Ram	5; 7	3; 6
2	(Bahrain) (Bangladesh)	Abdulkarim Abdulnabi; Sree-Amol Roy	1; 6	1; 6
3	(Bahrain) (Bangladesh)	Hasan Abdulnabi / Abdulla Mohamed Ahmed Mohamed; Ranjan Ram / Sree-Amol Roy	2; 6	4; 6

=== Jordan vs. Turkmenistan ===
Jordan
1
Theinbyu Tennis Plaza, Yangon, Myanmar
11 May 2007
Hard

Turkmenistan
2

			1	2	3
1	(Jordan) (Turkmenistan)	Fabio Badra; Eziz Dovletov	6; 2	6; 3
2	(Jordan) (Turkmenistan)	Sari Alotaibi; Myalikkuli Mamedkuliyev	1; 6	3; 6
3	(Jordan) (Turkmenistan)	Fabio Badra / Tareq Talal Shkakwa; Dovran Chagylov / Myalikkuli Mamedkuliyev	3; 6	5; 7

=== Bahrain vs. Tajikistan ===
Bahrain
1
Theinbyu Tennis Plaza, Yangon, Myanmar
12 May 2007
Hard

Tajikistan
2

			1	2	3
1	(Bahrain) (Tajikistan)	Hasan Abdulnabi; Mirkhusein Yakhyaev	6; 4	7^{7} 6^{1}
2	(Bahrain) (Tajikistan)	Khaled Al Thawadi; Dilshod Sharifi	1; 6	5; 7
3	(Bahrain) (Tajikistan)	Abdulkarim Abdulnabi / Khaled Al Thawadi; Sergey Makashin / Mansur Yakhyaev	3; 6	1; 6

=== Bangladesh vs. Turkmenistan ===
Bangladesh
2
Theinbyu Tennis Plaza, Yangon, Myanmar
12 May 2007
Hard

Turkmenistan
1

			1	2	3
1	(Bangladesh) (Turkmenistan)	Ranjan Ram; Evgeniy Jirnov	6; 3	6; 0
2	(Bangladesh) (Turkmenistan)	Sree-Amol Roy; Myalikkuli Mamedkuliyev	6; 3	6; 1
3	(Bangladesh) (Turkmenistan)	Mazharul-Pimon Islam / Henry Prithul Mondol; Dovran Chagylov / Myalikkuli Mamedkuliyev	4; 6	6; 3	8; 10

=== Bahrain vs. Jordan ===
Bahrain
1
Theinbyu Tennis Plaza, Yangon, Myanmar
13 May 2007
Hard

Jordan
2

			1	2	3
1	(Bahrain) (Jordan)	Hasan Abdulnabi; Ahmad Adas	6; 3	6; 2
2	(Bahrain) (Jordan)	Khaled Al Thawadi; Fabio Badra	6; 2	6^{4} 7^{7}	4; 6
3	(Bahrain) (Jordan)	Abdulkarim Abdulnabi / Abdulla Mohamed Ahmed Mohamed; Sari Alotaibi / Tareq Talal Shkakwa	1; 6	7^{7} 6^{4}	3; 6

=== Tajikistan vs. Bangladesh ===
Tajikistan
3
Theinbyu Tennis Plaza, Yangon, Myanmar
13 May 2007
Hard

Bangladesh
0

			1	2	3
1	(Tajikistan) (Bangladesh)	Sergey Makashin; Ranjan Ram	3; 6	6; 1	6; 2
2	(Tajikistan) (Bangladesh)	Dilshod Sharifi; Sree-Amol Roy	1; 6	6; 4	6; 4
3	(Tajikistan) (Bangladesh)	Sergey Makashin / Mirkhusein Yakhyaev; Mazharul-Pimon Islam / Henry Prithul Mondol	6; 3	3; 6	6; 4

== Pool B ==
	Pool B	SYR	MYA	QAT	IRQ	BRU
1	Syria (4–0)		3–0	3–0	3–0	3–0
2	Myanmar (3–1)	0–3		3–0	3–0	3–0
3	Qatar (2–2)	0–3	0–3		2–1	3–0
4	Iraq (1–3)	0–3	0–3	1–2		3–0
5	Brunei (0–4)	0–3	0–3	0–3	0–3	

- Syria advances to Asia/Oceania Group III in 2008.

=== Qatar vs. Brunei ===
Qatar
3
Theinbyu Tennis Plaza, Yangon, Myanmar
9 May 2007
Hard

Brunei
0

			1	2	3
1	(Qatar) (Brunei)	Abdulla Al-Haji; Abdul-Rasheed Abdullah	6; 0	6; 0
2	(Qatar) (Brunei)	Sultan Khalfan Al Alawi; Gavin Yeung Kok Lim	6; 1	6; 1
3	(Qatar) (Brunei)	Abdulla Al Shammari / Mohammed Al Shammari; Peng-Wuei Chua / Sie-Lu On	6; 2	6; 0

=== Myanmar vs. Iraq ===
Myanmar
3
Theinbyu Tennis Plaza, Yangon, Myanmar
9 May 2007
Hard

Iraq
0

			1	2	3
1	(Myanmar) (Iraq)	Kyaw Zaw Naing; Mohammad Al Hatem				w/o
2	(Myanmar) (Iraq)	Maung-Tu Maw; Akram M Abdalkarem Al-Saadi				w/o
3	(Myanmar) (Iraq)	Zaw-Zaw Latt / Khin-Maung Win; Mohamed Abbas-Salman / Ali Khairi Hashim Al Mayahi	6; 0	6; 0

=== Syria vs. Iraq ===
Syria
3
Theinbyu Tennis Plaza, Yangon, Myanmar
10 May 2007
Hard

Iraq
0

			1	2	3
1	(Syria) (Iraq)	Roy Radwan; Mohammad Al Hatem	6; 0	6; 0
2	(Syria) (Iraq)	Issam Haitham Taweel; Akram M Abdalkarem Al-Saadi	6; 2	6; 2
3	(Syria) (Iraq)	Robert Makzoume / Romain Radwan; Mohamed Abbas-Salman / Ali Khairi Hashim Al Mayahi	6; 0	6; 0

=== Myanmar vs. Brunei ===
Myanmar
3
Theinbyu Tennis Plaza, Yangon, Myanmar
10 May 2007
Hard

Brunei
0

			1	2	3
1	(Myanmar) (Brunei)	Kyaw Zaw Naing; Abdul-Rasheed Abdullah	6; 2	6; 1
2	(Myanmar) (Brunei)	Maung-Tu Maw; Gavin Yeung Kok Lim	6; 1	6; 1
3	(Myanmar) (Brunei)	Zaw-Zaw Latt / Khin-Maung Win; Abdul-Rasheed Abdullah / Sie-Lu On	6; 0	6; 2

=== Syria vs. Qatar ===
Syria
3
Theinbyu Tennis Plaza, Yangon, Myanmar
11 May 2007
Hard

Qatar
0

			1	2	3
1	(Syria) (Qatar)	Roy Radwan; Abdulla Al-Haji	6; 1	6; 2
2	(Syria) (Qatar)	Issam Haitham Taweel; Sultan Khalfan Al Alawi	6^{3} 7^{7}	4; 3		retired
3	(Syria) (Qatar)	Robert Makzoume / Romain Radwan; Abdulla Al Shammari / Abdulla Al-Haji	6; 2	6; 1

=== Iraq vs. Brunei ===
Iraq
3
Theinbyu Tennis Plaza, Yangon, Myanmar
11 May 2007
Hard

Brunei
0

			1	2	3
1	(Iraq) (Brunei)	Mohammad Al Hatem; Abdul-Rasheed Abdullah	6; 1	6; 3
2	(Iraq) (Brunei)	Akram M Abdalkarem Al-Saadi; Gavin Yeung Kok Lim	6; 1	6; 0
3	(Iraq) (Brunei)	Mohammad Al Hatem / Akram M Abdalkarem Al-Saadi; Gavin Yeung Kok Lim / Sie-Lu On	6^{4} 7^{7}	6; 1	6; 2

=== Syria vs. Brunei ===
Syria
3
Theinbyu Tennis Plaza, Yangon, Myanmar
12 May 2007
Hard

Brunei
0

			1	2	3
1	(Syria) (Brunei)	Robert Makzoume; Sie-Lu On	6; 0	6; 1
2	(Syria) (Brunei)	Romain Radwan; Gavin Yeung Kok Lim	6; 0	6; 1
3	(Syria) (Brunei)	Robert Makzoume / Romain Radwan; Peng-Wuei Chua / Gavin Yeung Kok Lim	6; 1	6; 0

=== Qatar vs. Myanmar ===
Qatar
0
Theinbyu Tennis Plaza, Yangon, Myanmar
12 May 2007
Hard

Myanmar
3

			1	2	3
1	(Qatar) (Myanmar)	Abdulla Al-Haji; Kyaw Zaw Naing	6^{5} 7^{7}	1; 6
2	(Qatar) (Myanmar)	Mohammed Al Shammari; Maung-Tu Maw	1; 6	0; 6
3	(Qatar) (Myanmar)	Abdulla Al Shammari / Mohammed Al Shammari; Zaw-Zaw Latt / Khin-Maung Win	4; 6	2; 6

=== Syria vs. Myanmar ===
Syria
3
Theinbyu Tennis Plaza, Yangon, Myanmar
13 May 2007
Hard

Myanmar
0

			1	2	3
1	(Syria) (Myanmar)	Roy Radwan; Kyaw Zaw Naing	6; 2	6; 4
2	(Syria) (Myanmar)	Issam Haitham Taweel; Maung-Tu Maw	6; 2	6; 2
3	(Syria) (Myanmar)	Robert Makzoume / Romain Radwan; Zaw-Zaw Latt / Khin-Maung Win	7; 5	7; 5

=== Qatar vs. Iraq ===
Qatar
2
Theinbyu Tennis Plaza, Yangon, Myanmar
13 May 2007
Hard

Iraq
1

			1	2	3
1	(Qatar) (Iraq)	Abdulla Al-Haji; Mohammad Al Hatem	7; 5	6; 3
2	(Qatar) (Iraq)	Abdulla Al Shammari; Akram M Abdalkarem Al-Saadi	6; 3	0; 6	1; 6
3	(Qatar) (Iraq)	Abdulla Al Shammari / Mohammed Al Shammari; Akram M Abdalkarem Al-Saadi / Ali Khairi Hashim Al Mayahi	6; 3	6; 4
