= 2016 Davis Cup Asia/Oceania Zone Group IV =

International tennis competition

The Asia/Oceania Zone was the unique zone within Group 4 of the regional Davis Cup competition in 2016. The zone's competition was held in round robin format in Amman, Jordan, in July 2016. Two nations won promotion to Group III, Asia/Oceania Zone, for 2017.

== Participating nations ==
- Bahrain
- Iraq
- Jordan
- Mongolia
- Myanmar
- Oman
- Saudi Arabia
- Tajikistan
- United Arab Emirates

=== Inactive nations ===
- Bangladesh
- Brunei
- Kyrgyzstan
- Yemen

== Draw ==
Date: 11–16 July 2016

Location: Al-Hussein Sport City, Amman, Jordan (clay)

Format: Round-robin basis. Two pools of four and five teams, respectively (Pools A and B). The winner of each pool plays off against the runner-up of the other pool to determine which two nations are promoted to Asia/Oceania Zone Group III in 2017.

Seeding: The seeding was based on the Davis Cup Rankings of 7 March 2016 (shown in parentheses below).

Pot 1	Pot 2	Pot 3	Pot 4
1. United Arab Emirates (98); 2. Jordan (106)	3. Saudi Arabia (107); 4. Iraq (116)	5. Bahrain (117); 6. Oman (120)	7. Mongolia (121); 8. Myanmar (124); 9. Tajikistan (–)

Group A

	United Arab Emirates	Oman	Saudi Arabia	Myanmar	RR W–L	Matches W–L	Sets W–L	Games W–L	Standings
United Arab Emirates		3–0	3–0	3–0	3–0	9–0	18–2	117–72	1
Oman	3–0		1–2	2–1	1–2	3–6	9–13	82–109	2
Saudi Arabia	0–3	2–1		1–2	1–2	3–6	8–14	99–105	3
Myanmar	0–3	1–2	2–1		1–2	3–6	8–14	97–109	4

Group B

	Jordan	Bahrain	Iraq	Tajikistan	Mongolia	RR W–L	Matches W–L	Sets W–L	Games W–L	Standings
Jordan		3–0	3–0	3–0	3–0	4–0	12–0	24–1	149–54	1
Bahrain	0–3		3–0	2–1	2–1	3–1	7–5	15–12	132–111	2
Iraq	0–3	0–3		2–1	2–1	2–2	4–8	8–16	88–114	3
Tajikistan	0–3	1–2	1–2		3–0	1–3	5–7	11–15	100–127	4
Mongolia	0–3	1–2	1–2	0–3		0–4	2–10	6–20	74–137	5

== First round ==
=== Group A ===
==== United Arab Emirates vs. Myanmar ====
United Arab Emirates
3
Al-Hussein Sport City, Amman, Jordan
11 July 2016
Clay

Myanmar
0

			1	2	3
1	(United Arab Emirates) (Myanmar)	Mahmoud Nader Al Blooshi; Aung Kyaw Naing	6; 3	6; 3
2	(United Arab Emirates) (Myanmar)	Omar Alawadhi; Tin Myo Wai	6; 3	6; 2
3	(United Arab Emirates) (Myanmar)	Abdulrahman Al Janahi / Omar Alawadhi; Aung Kyaw Naing / Phyo Min Thar	7; 6	6; 3

==== Saudi Arabia vs. Oman ====
Saudi Arabia
2
Al-Hussein Sport City, Amman, Jordan
11 July 2016
Clay

Oman
1

			1	2	3
1	(Saudi Arabia) (Oman)	Faisal Al Rebdi; Younis Al Rawahi	6; 1	6; 0
2	(Saudi Arabia) (Oman)	Abdullah Alfaraj; Mohammed Al Nabhani	4; 6	4; 6
3	(Saudi Arabia) (Oman)	Faisal Al Rebdi / Sulaiman Alqasem; Abdullah Al Barwani / Mohammed Al Nabhani	6; 2	0; 6	6; 4

==== United Arab Emirates vs. Oman ====
United Arab Emirates
3
Al-Hussein Sport City, Amman, Jordan
13 July 2016
Clay

Oman
0

			1	2	3
1	(United Arab Emirates) (Oman)	Fahad Al Janahi; Mohammed Al Nabhani	6; 3	3; 6	6; 4
2	(United Arab Emirates) (Oman)	Omar Alawadhi; Abdullah Al Barwani	6; 1	6; 2
3	(United Arab Emirates) (Oman)	Mahmoud Nader Al Blooshi / Abdulrahman Al Janahi; Mohammed Al Nabhani / Younis Al Rawahi	6; 0	7; 5

==== Saudi Arabia vs. Myanmar ====
Saudi Arabia
1
Al-Hussein Sport City, Amman, Jordan
13 July 2016
Clay

Myanmar
2

			1	2	3
1	(Saudi Arabia) (Myanmar)	Faisal Al Rebdi; Aung Kyaw Naing	6; 3	3; 6	6; 3
2	(Saudi Arabia) (Myanmar)	Abdullah Alfaraj; Tin Myo Wai	3; 6	3; 6
3	(Saudi Arabia) (Myanmar)	Faisal Al Rebdi / Sulaiman Alqasem; Aung Kyaw Naing / Phyo Min Thar	6; 3	4; 6	5; 7

==== United Arab Emirates vs. Saudi Arabia ====
United Arab Emirates
3
Al-Hussein Sport City, Amman, Jordan
15 July 2016
Clay

Saudi Arabia
0

			1	2	3
1	(United Arab Emirates) (Saudi Arabia)	Abdulrahman Al Janahi; Faisal Al Rebdi	6; 4	2; 6	7; 5
2	(United Arab Emirates) (Saudi Arabia)	Omar Alawadhi; Abdullah Alfaraj	6; 4	6; 2
3	(United Arab Emirates) (Saudi Arabia)	Abdulrahman Al Janahi / Omar Alawadhi; Faisal Al Rebdi / Abdullah Alfaraj	6; 4	7^{7} 6^{0}

==== Oman vs. Myanmar ====
Oman
2
Al-Hussein Sport City, Amman, Jordan
15 July 2016
Clay

Myanmar
1

			1	2	3
1	(Oman) (Myanmar)	Mohammed Al Nabhani; Aung Kyaw Naing	7^{13} 6^{11}	6; 2
2	(Oman) (Myanmar)	Abdullah Al Barwani; Tin Myo Wai	1; 6	6; 4	2; 6
3	(Oman) (Myanmar)	Abdullah Al Barwani / Mohammed Al Nabhani; Aung Kyaw Naing / Phyo Min Thar	1; 6	6; 1	7^{9} 6^{7}

=== Group B ===
==== Jordan vs. Mongolia ====
Jordan
3
Al-Hussein Sport City, Amman, Jordan
11 July 2016
Clay

Mongolia
0

			1	2	3
1	(Jordan) (Mongolia)	Seif Adas; Temuugei Enkhsaikhan	6; 0	6; 0
2	(Jordan) (Mongolia)	Mousa Alkotop; Duurenbayar Erdenebayar	6; 0	6; 2
3	(Jordan) (Mongolia)	Hamzeh Al-Aswad / Ahmed Ibrahim Ahmad Alhadid; Temuugei Enkhsaikhan / Duurenbayar Erdenebayar	6; 1	6; 4

==== Iraq vs. Tajikistan ====
Iraq
2
Enghelab Sports Complex, Tehran, Iran
11 July 2016
Clay

Tajikistan
1

			1	2	3
1	(Iraq) (Tajikistan)	Ali Khairi Hashim Al Mayahi; Mirkhusein Yakhyaev	6; 1	4; 0		retired
2	(Iraq) (Tajikistan)	Akram M. Abdalkarem Al-Saady; Anvar Rakhmatov	4; 6	4; 6
3	(Iraq) (Tajikistan)	Ali Khairi Hashim Al Mayahi / Akram M. Abdalkarem Al-Saady; Fariduni Hamid / Anvar Rakhmatov	6; 2	6; 4

==== Bahrain vs. Mongolia ====
Bahrain
2
Al-Hussein Sport City, Amman, Jordan
12 July 2016
Clay

Mongolia
1

			1	2	3
1	(Bahrain) (Mongolia)	Elyas Abdulnabi; Duurenbayar Erdenebayar	3; 6	2; 6
2	(Bahrain) (Mongolia)	Hasan Abdulnabi; Oyunbat Baatar	3; 6	6; 2	6; 0
3	(Bahrain) (Mongolia)	Abdulkarim Abdulnabi / Hasan Abdulnabi; Oyunbat Baatar / Duurenbayar Erdenebayar	6; 2	6; 1

==== Jordan vs. Tajikistan ====
Jordan
3
Al-Hussein Sport City, Amman, Jordan
12 July 2016
Clay

Tajikistan
0

			1	2	3
1	(Jordan) (Tajikistan)	Seif Adas; Mirkhusein Yakhyaev	6; 1	6; 0
2	(Jordan) (Tajikistan)	Mousa Alkotop; Fariduni Hamid	6; 1	6; 3
3	(Jordan) (Tajikistan)	Hamzeh Al-Aswad / Mousa Alkotop; Anvar Rakhmatov / Mirkhusein Yakhyaev	6; 2	6; 1

==== Iraq vs. Mongolia ====
Iraq
2
Al-Hussein Sport City, Amman, Jordan
13 July 2016
Clay

Mongolia
1

			1	2	3
1	(Iraq) (Mongolia)	Barakat Zainy; Duurenbayar Erdenebayar	5; 7	1; 6
2	(Iraq) (Mongolia)	Ali Khairi Hashim Al Mayahi; Oyunbat Baatar	6; 2	6; 1
3	(Iraq) (Mongolia)	Ali Khairi Hashim Al Mayahi / Akram M. Abdalkarem Al-Saady; Oyunbat Baatar / Duurenbayar Erdenebayar	6; 3	6; 2

==== Jordan vs. Bahrain ====
Jordan
3
Al-Hussein Sport City, Amman, Jordan
13 July 2016
Clay

Bahrain
0

			1	2	3
1	(Jordan) (Bahrain)	Seif Adas; Yusuf Qaed	6; 1	3; 6	6; 3
2	(Jordan) (Bahrain)	Mousa Alkotop; Hasan Abdulnabi	6; 4	6; 3
3	(Jordan) (Bahrain)	Hamzeh Al-Aswad / Ahmed Ibrahim Ahmad Alhadid; Abdulkarim Abdulnabi / Hasan Abdulnabi	7^{7} 6^{4}	6; 4

==== Tajikistan vs. Mongolia ====
Tajikistan
3
Al-Hussein Sport City, Amman, Jordan
14 July 2016
Clay

Mongolia
0

			1	2	3
1	(Tajikistan) (Mongolia)	Fariduni Hamid; Temuugei Enkhsaikhan	6; 4	2; 6	6; 1
2	(Tajikistan) (Mongolia)	Anvar Rakhmatov; Oyunbat Baatar	6; 3	6; 1
3	(Tajikistan) (Mongolia)	Fariduni Hamid / Mirkhusein Yakhyaev; Oyunbat Baatar / Temuugei Enkhsaikhan	6; 3	7; 5

==== Iraq vs. Bahrain ====
Iraq
0
Al-Hussein Sport City, Amman, Jordan
14 July 2016
Clay

Bahrain
3

			1	2	3
1	(Iraq) (Bahrain)	Ali Khairi Hashim Al Mayahi; Abdulkarim Abdulnabi	2; 6	2; 6
2	(Iraq) (Bahrain)	Akram M. Abdalkarem Al-Saady; Hasan Abdulnabi	0; 6	5; 7
3	(Iraq) (Bahrain)	Ali Suwaed / Barakat Zaini; Abdulkarim Abdulnabi / Hasan Abdulnabi	1; 6	4; 6

==== Jordan vs. Iraq ====
Jordan
3
Al-Hussein Sport City, Amman, Jordan
15 July 2016
Clay

Iraq
0

			1	2	3
1	(Jordan) (Iraq)	Seif Adas; Ali Khairi Hashim Al Mayahi	6; 3	6; 2
2	(Jordan) (Iraq)	Mousa Alkotop; Akram M. Abdalkarem Al-Saady	6; 0	6; 0
3	(Jordan) (Iraq)	Hamzeh Al-Aswad / Ahmed Ibrahim Ahmad Alhadid; Ali Suwaed / Barakat Zaini	6; 2	7; 5

==== Bahrain vs. Tajikistan ====
Bahrain
2
Al-Hussein Sport City, Amman, Jordan
15 July 2016
Clay

Tajikistan
1

			1	2	3
1	(Bahrain) (Tajikistan)	Abdulkarim Abdulnabi; Mirkhusein Yakhyaev	7^{7} 6^{5}	6; 0
2	(Bahrain) (Tajikistan)	Hasan Abdulnabi; Anvar Rakhmatov	1; 6	5; 7
3	(Bahrain) (Tajikistan)	Abdulkarim Abdulnabi / Hasan Abdulnabi; Anvar Rakhmatov / Mirkhusein Yakhyaev	4; 6	7; 5	6; 4

== Play-offs ==
Placing	A Team	Score	B Team
Promotional	United Arab Emirates	3–0	Bahrain
Promotional	Oman	1–2	Jordan
5th–6th	Saudi Arabia	0–3	Iraq
7th–8th	Myanmar	2–1	Tajikistan
9th	N/A	—	Mongolia

=== Promotional ===
==== United Arab Emirates vs. Bahrain ====
United Arab Emirates
3
Al-Hussein Sport City, Amman, Jordan
16 July 2016
Clay

Bahrain
0

			1	2	3
1	(United Arab Emirates) (Bahrain)	Fahad Al Janahi; Abdulkarim Abdulnabi	6; 0	6; 3
2	(United Arab Emirates) (Bahrain)	Omar Alawadhi; Hasan Abdulnabi	6; 0	7; 5
3	(United Arab Emirates) (Bahrain)	Abdulrahman Al Janahi / Omar Alawadhi; Elyas Abdulnabi / Yusuf Qaed	6; 4	6; 3

==== Oman vs. Jordan ====
Oman
1
Al-Hussein Sport City, Amman, Jordan
16 July 2016
Clay

Jordan
2

			1	2	3
1	(Oman) (Jordan)	Mohammed Al Nabhani; Seif Adas	3; 6	7^{7} 6^{4}	7^{7} 6^{4}
2	(Oman) (Jordan)	Abdullah Al Barwani; Mousa Alkotop	2; 6	4; 6
3	(Oman) (Jordan)	Abdullah Al Barwani / Mohammed Al Nabhani; Hamzeh Al-Aswad / Mousa Alkotop	2; 6	2; 6

=== 5th−6th ===
==== Saudi Arabia vs. Iraq ====
Saudi Arabia
0
Al-Hussein Sport City, Amman, Jordan
16 July 2016
Clay

Iraq
3

			1	2	3
1	(Saudi Arabia) (Iraq)	Abdulrahman Alazzam; Ali Suwaed	1; 6	4; 6
2	(Saudi Arabia) (Iraq)	Faisal Al Rebdi; Ali Khairi Hashim Al Mayahi	2; 6	5; 7
3	(Saudi Arabia) (Iraq)	Abdulrahman Alazzam / Abdullah Alfaraj; Akram M. Abdalkarem Al-Saady / Barakat Zainy	4; 6	4; 6

=== 7th−8th ===
==== Myanmar vs. Tajikistan ====
Myanmar
2
Al-Hussein Sport City, Amman, Jordan
16 July 2016
Clay

Tajikistan
1

			1	2	3
1	(Myanmar) (Tajikistan)	Aung Myo Thant; Saidov Farkhod	6; 1	6; 0
2	(Myanmar) (Tajikistan)	Tin Myo Wai; Fariduni Hamid	3; 6	6; 4	3; 6
3	(Myanmar) (Tajikistan)	Aung Kyaw Naing / Phyo Min Thar; Fariduni Hamid / Mirkhusein Yakhyaev	7^{9} 6^{7}	4; 6	6; 4
