= 2015 Davis Cup Asia/Oceania Zone Group III =

International tennis competition

The Asia/Oceania Zone was one of the four zones within Group 3 of the regional Davis Cup competition in 2015. The zone's competition was held in round robin format in Kuala Lumpur, Malaysia, in March 2015. The eight competing nations were divided into two pools of four. The winners and runners up from each pool played off to determine the two nations to be promoted to Asia/Oceania Zone Group II in 2016, while the remaining nations played to off to determine the two nations to be relegated to Asia/Oceania Zone Group IV in 2016.

== Participating nations ==
- Cambodia
- Hong Kong
- Malaysia
- Qatar
- Saudi Arabia
- Syria
- Turkmenistan
- Vietnam

== Draw ==
The eight teams were divided into two pools of four, using the following seeding:

Pot 1	Pot 2	Pot 3	Pot 4
1. Malaysia; 2. Vietnam	3. Hong Kong; 4. Syria	5. Cambodia; 6. Saudi Arabia	7. Qatar; 8. Turkmenistan

The winner of each pool plays off against the runner-up of the other pool, and the two winners of these play-offs are promoted to Asia/Oceania Zone Group II in 2016. The third placed team in each pool plays off against the fourth placed team in the other pool, and the two losers of these play-offs are relegated to Asia/Oceania Zone Group IV in 2016.

The group was staged from the 25th to 28 March 2015 at the Kompleks Tenis Tun Abd Razak at the National Tennis Centre in Kuala Lumpur, Malaysia.

Pool A

	Malaysia	Hong Kong	Qatar	Saudi Arabia	RR W–L	Matches W–L	Sets W–L	Games W–L	Standings
Malaysia		2–1	3–0	3–0	3–0	8–1	17–3	107–64	1
Hong Kong	1–2		2–1	3–0	2–1	6–3	13–9	113–84	2
Qatar	0–3	1–2		3–0	1–2	4–5	10–12	97–107	3
Saudi Arabia	0–3	0–3	0–3		0–3	0–9	2–18	57–119	4

Pool B

	Vietnam	Turkmenistan	Syria	Cambodia	RR W–L	Matches W–L	Sets W–L	Games W–L	Standings
Vietnam		3–0	2–1	3–0	3–0	8–1	16–2	102–54	1
Turkmenistan	0–3		2–1	2–1	2–1	4–5	8–12	84–105	2
Syria	1–2	1–2		2–1	1–2	4–5	9–10	94–82	3
Cambodia	0–3	1–2	1–2		0–3	2–7	5–14	65–104	4

== First round ==
=== Pool A ===
==== Malaysia vs. Qatar ====
Malaysia
3
Kompleks Tenis Tun Abd Razak, National Tennis Centre, Kuala Lumpur, Malaysia
25 March 2015
Hard, Outdoor

Qatar
0

			1	2	3
1	(Malaysia) (Qatar)	Ariez Elyaas Deen Heshaam; Jabor Al-Mutawa	6; 2	6; 1
2	(Malaysia) (Qatar)	Mohd Assri Merzuki; Mousa Shanan Zayed	1; 6	7; 5	6; 1
3	(Malaysia) (Qatar)	Syed Mohd Agil Syed Naguib / Muhammad Zainal Abidin; Mubarak Al Harrasi / Ali Al-Saygh	6; 3	7; 6

==== Hong Kong vs. Saudi Arabia ====
Hong Kong
3
Kompleks Tenis Tun Abd Razak, National Tennis Centre, Kuala Lumpur, Malaysia
25 March 2015
Hard, Outdoor

Saudi Arabia
0

			1	2	3
1	(Hong Kong) (Saudi Arabia)	Li Hei-yin; Omar Ahmed	6; 4	6; 1
2	(Hong Kong) (Saudi Arabia)	Wong Hong-kit; Fahad Al Saad	5; 7	6; 3	6; 1
3	(Hong Kong) (Saudi Arabia)	Phillip King / Lam Siu-fai; Omar Ahmed / Faisal Alrebdi	6; 2	6; 3

==== Malaysia vs. Hong Kong ====
Malaysia
2
Kompleks Tenis Tun Abd Razak, National Tennis Centre, Kuala Lumpur, Malaysia
26 March 2015
Hard, Outdoor

Hong Kong
1

			1	2	3
1	(Malaysia) (Hong Kong)	Mohd Assri Merzuki; Li Hei-yin	6; 3	6; 3
2	(Malaysia) (Hong Kong)	Syed Mohd Agil Syed Naguib; Wong Hong-kit	7^{7} 6^{4}	6; 3
3	(Malaysia) (Hong Kong)	Ariez Elyaas Deen Heshaam / Muhammad Zainal Abidin; Phillip King / Wong Hong-kit	3; 6	7; 5	3; 6

==== Saudi Arabia vs. Qatar ====
Saudi Arabia
0
Kompleks Tenis Tun Abd Razak, National Tennis Centre, Kuala Lumpur, Malaysia
26 March 2015
Hard, Outdoor

Qatar
3

			1	2	3
1	(Saudi Arabia) (Qatar)	Omar Ahmed; Jabor Al-Mutawa	2; 6	2; 6
2	(Saudi Arabia) (Qatar)	Fahad Al Saad; Mubarak Al Harrasi	6^{7} 7^{9}	0; 6
3	(Saudi Arabia) (Qatar)	Omar Al Thagib / Faisal Alrebdi; Ali Al-Saygh / Mousa Shanan Zayed	6^{2} 7^{7}	6; 3	6^{3} 7^{7}

==== Malaysia vs. Saudi Arabia ====
Malaysia
3
Kompleks Tenis Tun Abd Razak, National Tennis Centre, Kuala Lumpur, Malaysia
27 March 2015
Hard, Outdoor

Saudi Arabia
0

			1	2	3
1	(Malaysia) (Saudi Arabia)	Ariez Elyaas Deen Heshaam; Omar Ahmed	6; 1	6; 2
2	(Malaysia) (Saudi Arabia)	Syed Mohd Agil Syed Naguib; Faisal Alrebdi	6; 1	6; 0
3	(Malaysia) (Saudi Arabia)	Mohd Assri Merzuki / Muhammad Zainal Abidin; Omar Ahmed / Faisal Alrebdi	6; 1	6; 3

==== Hong Kong vs. Qatar ====
Hong Kong
2
Kompleks Tenis Tun Abd Razak, National Tennis Centre, Kuala Lumpur, Malaysia
27 March 2015
Hard, Outdoor

Qatar
1

			1	2	3
1	(Hong Kong) (Qatar)	Lam Siu-fai; Mousa Shanan Zayed	6; 1	6; 1
2	(Hong Kong) (Qatar)	Phillip King; Mubarak Al Harrasi	4; 6	7; 5	4; 6
3	(Hong Kong) (Qatar)	Lam Siu-fai / Wong Hong-kit; Mubarak Al Harrasi / Mousa Shanan Zayed	7; 5	0; 6	6; 1

=== Pool B ===
==== Vietnam vs. Turkmenistan ====
Vietnam
3
Kompleks Tenis Tun Abd Razak, National Tennis Centre, Kuala Lumpur, Malaysia
25 March 2015
Hard, Outdoor

Turkmenistan
0

			1	2	3
1	(Vietnam) (Turkmenistan)	Nguyễn Hoàng Thiên; Isa Mämmetgulyýew	6; 3	7^{7} 6^{2}
2	(Vietnam) (Turkmenistan)	Lý Hoàng Nam; Aleksandr Ernepesov	6; 0	6; 1
3	(Vietnam) (Turkmenistan)	Đỗ Minh Quân / Lam Quang Tri; Aleksandr Ernepesov / Georgiy Pochay	6; 1	7^{9} 6^{7}

==== Syria vs. Cambodia ====
Syria
2
Kompleks Tenis Tun Abd Razak, National Tennis Centre, Kuala Lumpur, Malaysia
25 March 2015
Hard, Outdoor

Cambodia
1

			1	2	3
1	(Syria) (Cambodia)	Marc Abdelnour; Phalkun Mam	6; 2	6; 3
2	(Syria) (Cambodia)	Bruno Abdel Nour; Kenny Bun	6^{4} 7^{7}	4; 6
3	(Syria) (Cambodia)	Bruno Abdel Nour / Marc Abdelnour; Socheaphearun Doeum / Phalkun Mam	6; 2	6; 1

==== Vietnam vs. Syria ====
Vietnam
2
Kompleks Tenis Tun Abd Razak, National Tennis Centre, Kuala Lumpur, Malaysia
26 March 2015
Hard, Outdoor

Syria
1

			1	2	3
1	(Vietnam) (Syria)	Nguyễn Hoàng Thiên; Kareem Al Allaf	6^{3} 7^{7}	1; 6
2	(Vietnam) (Syria)	Lý Hoàng Nam; Bruno Abdel Nour	6; 4	6; 1
3	(Vietnam) (Syria)	Đỗ Minh Quân / Lý Hoàng Nam; Bruno Abdel Nour / Marc Abdelnour	6; 2	6; 4

==== Cambodia vs. Turkmenistan ====
Cambodia
1
Kompleks Tenis Tun Abd Razak, National Tennis Centre, Kuala Lumpur, Malaysia
26 March 2015
Hard, Outdoor

Turkmenistan
2

			1	2	3
1	(Cambodia) (Turkmenistan)	Phalkun Mam; Georgiy Pochay	7^{9} 6^{7}	6; 3
2	(Cambodia) (Turkmenistan)	Kenny Bun; Isa Mämmetgulyýew	6; 1	3; 6	5; 6
3	(Cambodia) (Turkmenistan)	Socheaphearun Doeum / Phalkun Mam; Aleksandr Ernepesov / Georgiy Pochay	3; 6	1; 6

==== Vietnam vs. Cambodia ====
Vietnam
3
Kompleks Tenis Tun Abd Razak, National Tennis Centre, Kuala Lumpur, Malaysia
27 March 2015
Hard, Outdoor

Cambodia
0

			1	2	3
1	(Vietnam) (Cambodia)	Nguyễn Hoàng Thiên; Samneang Long	6; 1	6; 3
2	(Vietnam) (Cambodia)	Lý Hoàng Nam; Socheaphearun Doeum	6; 2	6; 2
3	(Vietnam) (Cambodia)	Đỗ Minh Quân / Lam Quang Tri; Socheaphearun Doeum / Samneang Long	6; 4	6; 1

==== Syria vs. Turkmenistan ====
Syria
1
Kompleks Tenis Tun Abd Razak, National Tennis Centre, Kuala Lumpur, Malaysia
27 March 2015
Hard, Outdoor

Turkmenistan
2

			1	2	3
1	(Syria) (Turkmenistan)	Kareem Al Allaf; Isa Mämmetgulyýew	3; 6	6^{1} 7^{7}
2	(Syria) (Turkmenistan)	Bruno Abdel Nour; Aleksandr Ernepesov	6; 4	6; 2
3	(Syria) (Turkmenistan)	Bruno Abdel Nour / Marc Abdelnour; Aleksandr Ernepesov / Georgiy Pochay	6; 1	3; 6	6^{6} 7^{8}

== Play-offs ==
=== Promotion ===
==== Malaysia vs. Turkmenistan ====
Malaysia
2
Kompleks Tenis Tun Abd Razak, National Tennis Centre, Kuala Lumpur, Malaysia
28 March 2015
Hard, Outdoor

Turkmenistan
0

			1	2	3
1	(Malaysia) (Turkmenistan)	Mohd Assri Merzuki; Georgiy Pochay	6^{3} 7^{7}	6; 3	6; 3
2	(Malaysia) (Turkmenistan)	Syed Mohd Agil Syed Naguib; Isa Mämmetgulyýew	6; 3	3; 6	6; 2
3	(Malaysia) (Turkmenistan)	Ariez Elyaas Deen Heshaam / Muhammad Zainal Abidin; Aleksandr Ernepesov / Georgiy Pochay				not played

==== Vietnam vs. Hong Kong ====
Vietnam
2
Kompleks Tenis Tun Abd Razak, National Tennis Centre, Kuala Lumpur, Malaysia
28 March 2015
Hard, Outdoor

Hong Kong
0

			1	2	3
1	(Vietnam) (Hong Kong)	Nguyễn Hoàng Thiên; Phillip King	6; 1	6; 0
2	(Vietnam) (Hong Kong)	Lý Hoàng Nam; Li Hei-yin	4; 6	6; 3	6; 2
3	(Vietnam) (Hong Kong)	Đỗ Minh Quân / Lam Quang Tri; Lam Siu-fai / Wong Hong-kit				not played

=== Relegation ===
==== Cambodia vs. Qatar ====
Cambodia
2
Kompleks Tenis Tun Abd Razak, National Tennis Centre, Kuala Lumpur, Malaysia
28 March 2015
Hard, Outdoor

Qatar
1

			1	2	3
1	(Cambodia) (Qatar)	Phalkun Mam; Jabor Al-Mutawa	6; 2	6; 1
2	(Cambodia) (Qatar)	Kenny Bun; Mubarak Al Harrasi	7; 5	6; 3
3	(Cambodia) (Qatar)	Socheaphearun Doeum / Samneang Long; Jabor Al-Mutawa / Mousa Shanan Zayed	2; 6	1; 6

==== Syria vs. Saudi Arabia ====
Syria
3
Kompleks Tenis Tun Abd Razak, National Tennis Centre, Kuala Lumpur, Malaysia
28 March 2015
Hard, Outdoor

Saudi Arabia
0

			1	2	3
1	(Syria) (Saudi Arabia)	Marc Abdelnour; Faisal Alrebdi	6; 3	6; 1
2	(Syria) (Saudi Arabia)	Bruno Abdel Nour; Fahad Al Saad	6; 3	6; 1
3	(Syria) (Saudi Arabia)	Marc Abdelnour / Amer Naow; Omar Ahmed / Omar Al Thagib	6; 1	3; 6	7; 5

== Outcomes ==
- Malaysia and Vietnam are promoted to Asia/Oceania Zone Group II in 2016
- Cambodia, Hong Kong, Syria and Turkmenistan remain in Asia/Oceania Zone Group III in 2016
- Qatar and Saudi Arabia are relegated to Asia/Oceania Zone Group IV in 2016. However, it was later decided by the Davis Cup Committee that Asia/Oceania Zone Group III would be expanded from eight teams to nine in 2016, and Qatar's relegation was therefore overturned.
