= 2016 Davis Cup Asia/Oceania Zone Group III =

International tennis competition

The Asia/Oceania Zone was one of the four zones within Group 3 of the regional Davis Cup competition in 2016. The zone's competition was held in round robin format in Tehran, Iran, in July 2016. Two nations won promotion to Group II, Asia/Oceania Zone, for 2017 and two nations got relegated to Group IV, Asia/Oceania Zone, for 2017.

== Participating nations ==
- Cambodia
- Hong Kong
- Iran
- Lebanon
- Pacific Oceania
- Qatar
- Singapore
- Syria
- Turkmenistan

== Draw ==
Date: 11–16 July 2016

Location: Enghelab Sports Complex, Tehran, Iran (clay)

Format: Round-robin basis. Two pools of four and five teams, respectively (Pools A and B). The winner of each pool plays off against the runner-up of the other pool to determine which two nations are promoted to Asia/Oceania Zone Group II in 2017.

Seeding: The seeding was based on the Davis Cup Rankings of 7 March 2016 (shown in parentheses below).

| Pot 1 | Pot 2 | Pot 3 | Pot 4 |
|---|---|---|---|
| 1. Iran (87); 2. Syria (90) | 3. Lebanon (93); 4. Turkmenistan (95) | 5. Hong Kong (96); 6. Cambodia (97) | 7. Pacific Oceania (99); 8. Qatar (100); 9. Singapore (103) |

Group A

| | Iran | Hong Kong | Pacific Oceania | Turkmenistan | RR W–L | Matches W–L | Sets W–L | Games W–L | Standings |
| Iran | | 2–1 | 3–0 | 3–0 | 3–0 | 8–1 | 16–2 | 108–60 | 1 |
| Hong Kong | 1–2 | | 3–0 | 2–1 | 2–1 | 6–3 | 13–7 | 107–78 | 2 |
| Pacific Oceania | 0–3 | 0–3 | | 2–1 | 1–2 | 2–7 | 5–14 | 69–102 | 3 |
| Turkmenistan | 0–3 | 1–2 | 1–2 | | 0–3 | 2–7 | 4–15 | 59–103 | 4 |

Group B

| | Lebanon | Syria | Qatar | Cambodia | Singapore | RR W–L | Matches W–L | Sets W–L | Games W–L | Standings |
| Lebanon | | 3–0 | 3–0 | 3–0 | 3–0 | 4–0 | 12–0 | 24–1 | 153–79 | 1 |
| Syria | 0–3 | | 2–1 | 3–0 | 3–0 | 3–1 | 8–4 | 17–11 | 149–125 | 2 |
| Qatar | 0–3 | 1–2 | | 3–0 | 3–0 | 2–2 | 7–5 | 17–13 | 161–158 | 3 |
| Cambodia | 0–3 | 0–3 | 0–3 | | 2–1 | 1–3 | 2–10 | 7–20 | 111–153 | 4 |
| Singapore | 0–3 | 0–3 | 0–3 | 1–2 | | 0–4 | 1–11 | 3–23 | 97–156 | 5 |

== First round ==
=== Group A ===
==== Iran vs. Pacific Oceania ====
Iran
3
Enghelab Sports Complex, Tehran, Iran
11 July 2016
Clay

Pacific Oceania
0

| | | | 1 | 2 | 3 |
|---|---|---|---|---|---|
| 1 | (Iran) (Pacific Oceania) | Anoosha Shahgholi; Heve Kelley | 6; 1 | 6; 4 |
| 2 | (Iran) (Pacific Oceania) | Shahin Khaledan; William O'Connell | 6; 1 | 6; 1 |
| 3 | (Iran) (Pacific Oceania) | Mohammad Karegaran / Amirvala Madanchi; Brett Baudinet / Daniel Llarenas | 6; 3 | 6; 4 |

==== Turkmenistan vs. Hong Kong ====
Turkmenistan
1
Enghelab Sports Complex, Tehran, Iran
11 July 2016
Clay

Hong Kong
2

| | | | 1 | 2 | 3 |
|---|---|---|---|---|---|
| 1 | (Turkmenistan) (Hong Kong) | Yuriy Roguskiy; Karan Rastogi | 1; 6 | 1; 6 |
| 2 | (Turkmenistan) (Hong Kong) | Isa Mammetgulyyev; Jack Wong | 1; 6 | 6; 3 | 6; 3 |
| 3 | (Turkmenistan) (Hong Kong) | Aleksandr Ernepesov / Isa Mammetgulyyev; Karan Rastogi / Chun Hun Wong | 2; 6 | 1; 6 |

==== Iran vs. Hong Kong ====
Iran
2
Enghelab Sports Complex, Tehran, Iran
13 July 2016
Clay

Hong Kong
1

| | | | 1 | 2 | 3 |
|---|---|---|---|---|---|
| 1 | (Iran) (Hong Kong) | Anoosha Shahgholi; Anthony Jackie Tang | 7^{7} 6^{3} | 6; 4 |
| 2 | (Iran) (Hong Kong) | Shahin Khaledan; Karan Rastogi | 7; 5 | 6; 4 |
| 3 | (Iran) (Hong Kong) | Mohammad Karegaran / Amirvala Madanchi; Chun Hun Wong / Jack Wong | 6^{4} 7^{7} | 3; 6 |

==== Turkmenistan vs. Pacific Oceania ====
Turkmenistan
1
Enghelab Sports Complex, Tehran, Iran
13 July 2016
Clay

Pacific Oceania
2

| | | | 1 | 2 | 3 |
|---|---|---|---|---|---|
| 1 | (Turkmenistan) (Pacific Oceania) | Yuriy Roguskiy; Heve Kelley | 3; 6 | 2; 6 |
| 2 | (Turkmenistan) (Pacific Oceania) | Isa Mammetgulyyev; William O'Connell | 6; 3 | 6; 2 |
| 3 | (Turkmenistan) (Pacific Oceania) | Isa Mammetgulyyev / Yuriy Roguskiy; Brett Baudinet / Daniel Llarenas | 4; 6 | 6^{9} 7^{11} |

==== Iran vs. Turkmenistan ====
Iran
3
Enghelab Sports Complex, Tehran, Iran
15 July 2016
Clay

Turkmenistan
0

| | | | 1 | 2 | 3 |
|---|---|---|---|---|---|
| 1 | (Iran) (Turkmenistan) | Amirvala Madanchi; Atlymyrat Gurbanov | 6; 1 | 6; 1 |
| 2 | (Iran) (Turkmenistan) | Shahin Khaledan; Isa Mammetgulyyev | 7^{7} 6^{2} | 6; 3 |
| 3 | (Iran) (Turkmenistan) | Mohammad Karegaran / Anoosha Shahgholi; Aleksandr Ernepesov / Atlymyrat Gurbanov | 6; 2 | 6; 1 |

==== Hong Kong vs. Pacific Oceania ====
Hong Kong
3
Enghelab Sports Complex, Tehran, Iran
15 July 2016
Clay

Pacific Oceania
0

| | | | 1 | 2 | 3 |
|---|---|---|---|---|---|
| 1 | (Hong Kong) (Pacific Oceania) | Anthony Jackie Tang; Heve Kelley | 6; 4 | 6; 2 |
| 2 | (Hong Kong) (Pacific Oceania) | Karan Rastogi; William O'Connell | 6; 3 | 6; 1 |
| 3 | (Hong Kong) (Pacific Oceania) | Chun Hun Wong / Jack Wong; Brett Baudinet / Daniel Llarenas | 2; 6 | 6; 3 | 7^{7} 6^{3} |

=== Group B ===
==== Lebanon vs. Cambodia ====
Lebanon
3
Enghelab Sports Complex, Tehran, Iran
11 July 2016
Clay

Cambodia
0

| | | | 1 | 2 | 3 |
|---|---|---|---|---|---|
| 1 | (Lebanon) (Cambodia) | Hady Habib; Nysan Tan | 6; 2 | 6; 2 |
| 2 | (Lebanon) (Cambodia) | Giovani Samaha; Kenny Bun | 6; 2 | 7^{7} 6^{3} |
| 3 | (Lebanon) (Cambodia) | Jad Ballout / Hady Habib; Phalkun Mam / Nysan Tan | 6; 4 | 6; 3 |

==== Singapore vs. Qatar ====
Singapore
0
Enghelab Sports Complex, Tehran, Iran
11 July 2016
Clay

Qatar
3

| | | | 1 | 2 | 3 |
|---|---|---|---|---|---|
| 1 | (Singapore) (Qatar) | Shaheed Alam; Jabor Mohammed Ali Mutawa | 6^{5} 7^{7} | 5; 7 |
| 2 | (Singapore) (Qatar) | Roy Hobbs; Mubarak Shannan Zayid | 2; 6 | 2; 6 |
| 3 | (Singapore) (Qatar) | Sherwin Foo / Roy Hobbs; Mousa Shanan Zayed / Mubarak Shannan Zayid | 6; 3 | 3; 6 | 6^{2} 7^{7} |

==== Syria vs. Singapore ====
Syria
3
Enghelab Sports Complex, Tehran, Iran
12 July 2016
Clay

Singapore
0

| | | | 1 | 2 | 3 |
|---|---|---|---|---|---|
| 1 | (Syria) (Singapore) | Amer Naow; Shaheed Alam | 6; 3 | 6; 4 |
| 2 | (Syria) (Singapore) | Kareem Allaf; Roy Hobbs | 6; 0 | 6; 4 |
| 3 | (Syria) (Singapore) | Bruno Abdel Nour / Amer Naow; Sherwin Foo / Hao Yuan Ng | 6; 4 | 6; 0 |

==== Cambodia vs. Qatar ====
Cambodia
0
Enghelab Sports Complex, Tehran, Iran
12 July 2016
Clay

Qatar
3

| | | | 1 | 2 | 3 |
|---|---|---|---|---|---|
| 1 | (Cambodia) (Qatar) | Nysan Tan; Mousa Shanan Zayed | 6; 3 | 4; 6 | 2; 6 |
| 2 | (Cambodia) (Qatar) | Kenny Bun; Mubarak Shannan Zayid | 3; 6 | 4; 6 |
| 3 | (Cambodia) (Qatar) | Samneang Long / Phalkun Mam; Jabor Mohammed Ali Mutawa / Mousa Shanan Zayed | 5; 7 | 5; 7 |

==== Syria vs. Qatar ====
Syria
2
Enghelab Sports Complex, Tehran, Iran
13 July 2016
Clay

Qatar
1

| | | | 1 | 2 | 3 |
|---|---|---|---|---|---|
| 1 | (Syria) (Qatar) | Bruno Abdel Nour; Jabor Mohammed Ali Mutawa | 7^{7} 6^{4} | 6^{2} 7^{7} | 6; 3 |
| 2 | (Syria) (Qatar) | Kareem Allaf; Mubarak Shannan Zayid | 6^{2} 7^{7} | 7; 5 | 6; 4 |
| 3 | (Syria) (Qatar) | Bruno Abdel Nour / Amer Naow; Mousa Shanan Zayed / Mubarak Shannan Zayid | 7^{7} 6^{3} | 6^{5} 7^{7} | 5; 7 |

==== Lebanon vs. Singapore ====
Lebanon
3
Enghelab Sports Complex, Tehran, Iran
13 July 2016
Clay

Singapore
0

| | | | 1 | 2 | 3 |
|---|---|---|---|---|---|
| 1 | (Lebanon) (Singapore) | Hady Habib; Hao Yuan Ng | 6; 2 | 6; 2 |
| 2 | (Lebanon) (Singapore) | Giovani Samaha; Roy Hobbs | 6; 2 | 6; 4 |
| 3 | (Lebanon) (Singapore) | Jad Ballout / Kamil Khalil; Roy Hobbs / Hao Yuan Ng | 6; 3 | 6; 4 |

==== Syria vs. Cambodia ====
Syria
3
Enghelab Sports Complex, Tehran, Iran
14 July 2016
Clay

Cambodia
0

| | | | 1 | 2 | 3 |
|---|---|---|---|---|---|
| 1 | (Syria) (Cambodia) | Amer Naow; Nysan Tan | 6; 1 | 6; 4 |
| 2 | (Syria) (Cambodia) | Kareem Allaf; Phalkun Mam | 6; 1 | 6; 3 |
| 3 | (Syria) (Cambodia) | Kareem Allaf / Amer Naow; Samneang Long / Nysan Tan | 6; 4 | 4; 6 | 6; 2 |

==== Lebanon vs. Qatar ====
Lebanon
3
Enghelab Sports Complex, Tehran, Iran
14 July 2016
Clay

Qatar
0

| | | | 1 | 2 | 3 |
|---|---|---|---|---|---|
| 1 | (Lebanon) (Qatar) | Hady Habib; Mousa Shanan Zayed | 6; 1 | 6; 0 |
| 2 | (Lebanon) (Qatar) | Giovani Samaha; Mubarak Shannan Zayid | 4; 6 | 7^{7} 6^{5} | 7; 5 |
| 3 | (Lebanon) (Qatar) | Jad Ballout / Kamil Khalil; Abdullah Shannan Alharrasi / Mousa Shanan Zayed | 6; 3 | 7; 5 |

==== Syria vs. Lebanon ====
Syria
0
Enghelab Sports Complex, Tehran, Iran
15 July 2016
Clay

Lebanon
3

| | | | 1 | 2 | 3 |
|---|---|---|---|---|---|
| 1 | (Syria) (Lebanon) | Amer Naow; Hady Habib | 2; 6 | 3; 6 |
| 2 | (Syria) (Lebanon) | Bruno Abdel Nour; Giovani Samaha | 2; 6 | 5; 7 |
| 3 | (Syria) (Lebanon) | Kareem Allaf / Amer Naow; Jad Ballout / Hady Habib | 2; 6 | 3; 6 |

==== Cambodia vs. Singapore ====
Cambodia
2
Enghelab Sports Complex, Tehran, Iran
15 July 2016
Clay

Singapore
1

| | | | 1 | 2 | 3 |
|---|---|---|---|---|---|
| 1 | (Cambodia) (Singapore) | Samneang Long; Hao Yuan Ng | 5; 7 | 6; 3 | 5; 7 |
| 2 | (Cambodia) (Singapore) | Kenny Bun; Roy Hobbs | 6; 3 | 6; 4 |
| 3 | (Cambodia) (Singapore) | Phalkun Mam / Nysan Tan; Shaheed Alam / Sherwin Foo | 7^{11} 6^{9} | 7; 5 |

== Play-offs ==
| Placing | A Team | Score | B Team |
|---|---|---|---|
| Promotion | Iran | 2–1 | Syria |
| Promotion | Hong Kong | 2–1 | Lebanon |
| 5th | N/A | — | Qatar |
| Relegation | Pacific Oceania | 3–0 | Singapore |
| Relegation | Turkmenistan | 2–1 | Cambodia |

=== Promotional ===
==== Iran vs. Syria ====
Iran
2
Enghelab Sports Complex, Tehran, Iran
16 July 2016
Clay

Syria
1

| | | | 1 | 2 | 3 |
|---|---|---|---|---|---|
| 1 | (Iran) (Syria) | Anoosha Shahgholi; Amer Naow | 6^{2} 7^{7} | 7^{8} 6^{6} | 6; 1 |
| 2 | (Iran) (Syria) | Shahin Khaledan; Kareem Allaf | 3; 6 | 6; 1 | 4; 6 |
| 3 | (Iran) (Syria) | Amirvala Madanchi / Anoosha Shahgholi; Bruno Abdel Nour / Amer Naow | 6; 3 | 6; 2 |

==== Hong Kong vs. Lebanon ====
Hong Kong
2
Enghelab Sports Complex, Tehran, Iran
16 July 2016
Clay

Lebanon
1

| | | | 1 | 2 | 3 |
|---|---|---|---|---|---|
| 1 | (Hong Kong) (Lebanon) | Anthony Jackie Tang; Hady Habib | 3; 6 | 2; 6 |
| 2 | (Hong Kong) (Lebanon) | Karan Rastogi; Giovani Samaha | 6; 3 | 6; 2 |
| 3 | (Hong Kong) (Lebanon) | Karan Rastogi / Chun Hun Wong; Jed Ballout / Hady Habib | 6; 3 | 6; 4 |

=== Relegation ===
==== Pacific Oceania vs. Singapore ====
Pacific Oceania
3
Enghelab Sports Complex, Tehran, Iran
16 July 2016
Clay

Singapore
0

| | | | 1 | 2 | 3 |
|---|---|---|---|---|---|
| 1 | (Pacific Oceania) (Singapore) | Heve Kelley; Shaheed Alam | 6; 1 | 6; 4 |
| 2 | (Pacific Oceania) (Singapore) | William O'Connell; Roy Hobbs | 6; 3 | 6; 2 |
| 3 | (Pacific Oceania) (Singapore) | Brett Baudinet / Daniel Llarenas; Roy Hobbs / Hao Yuan Ng | 6; 4 | 6; 3 |

==== Turkmenistan vs. Cambodia ====
Turkmenistan
2
Enghelab Sports Complex, Tehran, Iran
16 July 2016
Clay

Cambodia
1

| | | | 1 | 2 | 3 |
|---|---|---|---|---|---|
| 1 | (Turkmenistan) (Cambodia) | Yuriy Roguskiy; Nysan Tan | 6; 3 | 6; 3 |
| 2 | (Turkmenistan) (Cambodia) | Isa Mammetgulyyev; Kenny Bun | 6; 2 | 6; 1 |
| 3 | (Turkmenistan) (Cambodia) | Aleksandr Ernepesov / Atlymyrat Gurbanov; Samneang Long / Nysan Tan | 6; 3 | 6^{2} 7^{7} | 4; 6 |
