= Roy Hobbs =

Roy Hobbs may refer to:

- Roy Hobbs (baseball), protagonist of The Natural, a 1952 novel about baseball
- Roy Hobbs (tennis), Singaporean tennis player
