= Turkmenistan Davis Cup team =

National tennis team

Turkmenistan
- Captain: Victor Krasnov
- Nations Ranking: 110 ▲1
- First year: 2004
- Years played: 15
- Ties played (W–L): 68 (20–48)
- Best finish: Asia/Oceania Zone group III; 3rd place (2015)
- Most total wins: Aleksandr Ernepesov (21–18)
- Most singles wins: Aleksandr Ernepesov (12–10)
- Most doubles wins: Aleksandr Ernepesov (9–8)
- Best doubles team: Aleksandr Ernepesov & Georgiy Pochay (6–3)
- Most ties played: Aleksandr Ernepesov (30)
- Most years played: Eziz Dovletov (8)

The Turkmenistan men's national tennis team represents Turkmenistan in Davis Cup tennis competition and are governed by the Turkmenistan Tennis Association.

Turkmenistan currently compete in the Asia/Oceania Zone of Group IV.

Turkmenistan finished 4th in Pool B of Asia/Oceania Zone Group IV in 2008 and remains in that group for 2009.

Best Davis Cup Performance Asia/Oceania Zone Group III 3rd place in 2015.

Turkmenistan achieved its first Davis Cup victory in 2007, after 14 defeats, with wins over Bahrain and Jordan.

== History ==
Turkmenistan competed in its first Davis Cup in 2004.

== Current team (2022) ==
TBD

== Statistics ==
Last updated: Turkmenistan - Bangladesh; 3 February 2018

Record

- Total: 20–48 (29.4%)

Head-to-head record (2004–)

DC team	Pld	W	L
Bahrain	5	3	2
Bangladesh	7	2	5
Brunei	1	0	1
Cambodia	4	2	2
Guam	1	0	1
Hong Kong	1	0	1
Iran	1	0	1
Iraq	4	3	1
Jordan	5	1	4
Kyrgyzstan	1	0	1
Lebanon	1	0	1
Malaysia	3	0	3
Mongolia	2	1	1
Myanmar	2	0	2
Pacific Oceania	2	0	2
Qatar	4	1	3
Saudi Arabia	4	2	2
Singapore	4	1	3
Syria	4	1	3
Tajikistan	3	1	2
United Arab Emirates	7	1	6
Vietnam	1	0	1
Yemen	1	1	0
Total (23)	68	20	48

Record against continents

Africa	Asia	Europe	North America	Oceania	South America
	Bahrain; Bangladesh; Brunei; Cambodia; Hong Kong; Iran; Iraq; Jordan; Kyrgyzstan; Lebanon; Malaysia; Mongolia; Myanmar; Qatar; Saudi Arabia; Singapore; Syria; Tajikistan; United Arab Emirates; Vietnam; Yemen			Guam; Pacific Oceania	
Record: 0-0	Record: 20-45 (30.8%)	Record: 0-0	Record: 0-0	Record: 0-3 (0.0%)	Record: 0-0

Record by decade

- 2004–2009: 4–22 (15.4%)
- 2010–2019: 16–26 (38.1%)

== See also ==
- Davis Cup
- Turkmenistan Billie Jean King Cup team
