= Jabor Al-Mutawa =

Qatari tennis player

- Full name: Jabor Mohammed Ali Mutawa
- Country (sports): Qatar
- Born: May 27, 1994 (age 31)
- Prize money: $72,033

Singles
- Career record: 0–4

Doubles
- Career record: 0–5
- Highest ranking: No. 1304 (November 20, 2017)

Jabor Mohammed Ali Mutawa (born May 27, 1994) is a Qatari tennis player.

Mutawa represented Qatar in the Davis Cup. He also represented Qatar at the 2014 Asian Games.

Mutawa has competed multiple times in the Qatar ExxonMobil Open.
