= Mousa Shanan Zayed =

Qatari tennis player

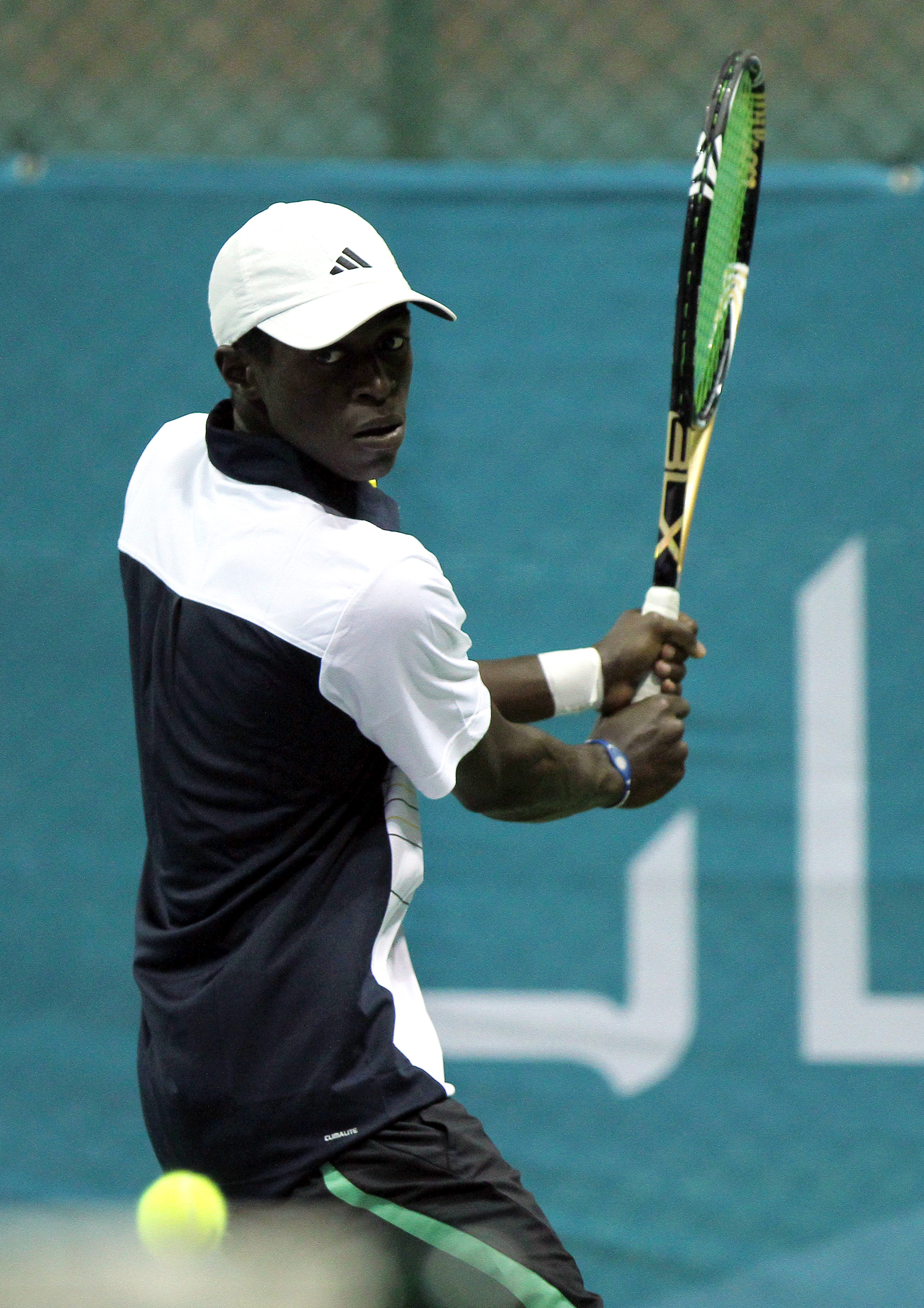
- Zayed at the 2011 Pan Arab Games
- Country (sports): Qatar
- Residence: Oman
- Born: 9 March 1994 (age 32) Doha, Qatar
- Plays: Right-handed
- Prize money: $54,656

Singles
- Career record: 0–2
- Career titles: 0
- Highest ranking: No. 1,668 (15 October 2012)

Doubles
- Career record: 0–6
- Career titles: 0
- Highest ranking: No. 1,304 (27 November 2017)
- Current ranking: No. 1,657 (2 April 2018)
- Last updated on: 6 April 2018.

Mousa Shanan Zayed Al-Harrasi (born 9 March 1994) is a Qatari tennis player.

== Career ==
Zayed mainly plays on the futures circuit and has also competed for the Qatari Davis Cup team since he was 14, where he holds a 24–25 record, the second largest number of wins for the country.

Zayed has received wildcards into the main draw of the singles and doubles of the Qatar Open in both 2013 and 2014. In 2013 he faced Frenchman Gael Monfils in his opening match, but only won three games in a straight sets loss. At the singles event of the 2014 competition, he faced grand slam champion Andy Murray in his opening match, however, was dominated in a straight sets defeat without winning a single game, suffering the third double bagel loss of his career. Zayed dropped out of the ATP rankings for the second time in December 2014, after losing his only ranking point.
