= Mongolia Davis Cup team =

National tennis team of Mongolia

The Mongolia Davis Cup team represents Mongolia in Davis Cup tennis competition and are governed by the Mongolian Tennis Association.

Mongolia currently compete in the Asia/Oceania Zone of Group IV.

Mongolia finished fifth of six teams in their Group IV round-robin pool in 2008.

== History ==
Mongolia competed in its first Davis Cup in 2008.

== Current team (2022) ==
TBD

== See also ==
- Davis Cup
- Mongolia Billie Jean King Cup team
