= Roy Hobbs (tennis) =

Singaporean tennis player

- Country (sports): Singapore
- Residence: Singapore
- Born: 13 August 1989 (age 36) Singapore
- Height: 1.83 m (6 ft 0 in)
- Plays: Right-handed (one-handed backhand)
- Prize money: $10,567

Singles
- Career record: 20–15 (at ATP Tour level, Grand Slam level, and in Davis Cup)
- Career titles: 0
- Highest ranking: No. 1346 (21 March 2016)

Doubles
- Career record: 17–8 (at ATP Tour level, Grand Slam level, and in Davis Cup)
- Career titles: 0
- Highest ranking: No. 1166 (11 April 2016)
- Current ranking: No. 2239 (15 February 2021)
- Last updated on: 15 February 2021.

Roy Hobbs (born 13 August 1989) is a Singaporean tennis player. With a world ranking of #1346 in 2016, Hobbs became and still remains the highest ranked tennis player in Singaporean history.

Hobbs has a career high ATP singles ranking of 1346 achieved on 21 March 2016. He also has a career high ATP doubles ranking of 1166 achieved on 11 April 2016.

Hobbs represents Singapore at the Davis Cup, where he has a W/L record of 37–23. He owns the most Davis Cup wins for Singapore.
