= Hasan Abdulnabi =

Bahraini tennis player

- Country (sports): Bahrain
- Born: 12 February 1989 (age 36); Manama, Bahrain
- Plays: Left-handed (two-handed backhand)
- Prize money: $1,262

Singles
- Career record: 17–17 (at ATP Tour level, Grand Slam level, and in Davis Cup)
- Career titles: 0
- Highest ranking: No. 1697 (7 April 2014)

Doubles
- Career record: 13–17 (at ATP Tour level, Grand Slam level, and in Davis Cup)
- Career titles: 0
- Last updated on: 15 November 2021.

Hasan Abdulnabi (born 12 February 1989) is a Bahraini tennis player.

Abdulnabi has a career high ATP singles ranking of 1697 achieved on 7 April 2014.

Abdulnabi represents Bahrain at the Davis Cup, where he has a W/L record of 30–34.
