= Abdulkarim Abdulnabi =

Bahraini tennis player

- Country (sports): Bahrain
- Born: 24 May 1987 (age 37); Isa Town, Bahrain
- Plays: Right-handed (two-handed backhand)
- Prize money: $352

Singles
- Career record: 5–7 (at ATP Tour level, Grand Slam level, and in Davis Cup)
- Career titles: 0

Doubles
- Career record: 13–13 (at ATP Tour level, Grand Slam level, and in Davis Cup)
- Career titles: 0
- Last updated on: 15 November 2021.

Abdulkarim Abdulnabi (born 24 May 1987) is a Bahraini tennis player.

Abdulnabi represents Bahrain at the Davis Cup, where he has a W/L record of 18–20.
