= Myanmar Davis Cup team =

National sports team

Myanmar
- ITF ranking: 114
- First year: 1955
- Years played: 16
- Ties played (W–L): 64 (27–37)
- Most total wins: Zaw Zaw Latt (29–24)
- Most singles wins: Zaw Zaw Latt (16–10)
- Most doubles wins: Zaw Zaw Latt (13–14)
- Best doubles team: Zaw Zaw Latt / Khin Maung Win (5–5)
- Most ties played: Zaw Zaw Latt (35)
- Most years played: Min Min / Zaw Zaw Latt / Aung Kyaw Naing (8)

The Myanmar Davis Cup team represents Myanmar in Davis Cup tennis competition and are governed by the Tennis Federation of Myanmar.

They have not competed since 2018.

They finished third in Group IV in 2003.

== History ==
Myanmar competed in its first Davis Cup in 1955, but competed in only two ties until 2003.

== Last team (2018) ==
- Aung Myo Thant
- Tin Myo Wai
- Aung Kyaw Naing Paloungakn (Captain-player)
- Zaw San Oo

== See also ==
- Davis Cup
