= Kyrgyzstan Davis Cup team =

National tennis team

The Kyrgyzstan men's national tennis team represents Kyrgyzstan in Davis Cup tennis competition and are governed by the Kyrgyzstan Tennis Federation.

Kyrgyzstan currently compete in the Asia/Oceania Zone of Group IV.

== History ==
Kyrgyzstan competed in its first Davis Cup in 2002. Their best result was seventh place in Group III in 2003. Prior to 1993, Kyrgyz players represented the Soviet Union.

== Current team (2022) ==
- Mirgiiaz Mirdzhaliev
- Ilgiz Kamchibekov (Junior player)
- Evgeniy Babak

== See also ==
- Davis Cup
- Kyrgyzstan Billie Jean King Cup team
