= Iraq Davis Cup team =

National tennis team

The Iraq Davis Cup team represents Iraq in Davis Cup tennis competition and are governed by the Iraqi Tennis Federation. Iraq currently compete in the Asia/Oceania Zone of Group IV. They competed in Group II from 1988-1990, but failed to advance beyond the first round.

== History ==
Iraq competed in its first Davis Cup in 1988.

== Current team (2026) ==
The following players represented Iraq in the 2026 Davis Cup Asia/Oceania Zone Group IV tournament:

- Mohammed Al-Shammari
- Akam Bakr
- Amin Al-Ubaidy

== See also ==
- Davis Cup
- Iraq Billie Jean King Cup team
