= Bahrain Davis Cup team =

National tennis team

The Bahrain Davis Cup team represents Bahrain in Davis Cup tennis competition and are governed by the Bahrain Tennis Federation.

Bahrain currently compete in the Asia/Oceania Zone of Group IV.

== History ==
- Bahrain competed in its first Davis Cup in 1989.

== See also ==
- Davis Cup
- Bahrain Billie Jean King Cup team
