= 2022 Davis Cup Asia/Oceania Zone Group IV =

Davis Cup competition in 2022

The Asia/Oceania Zone was the unique zone within Group 4 of the regional Davis Cup competition in 2022. The zone's competition was held in round robin format in Colombo, Sri Lanka, from 8 to 13 August 2022 and in Isa Town, Bahrain, from 17 to 22 October 2022.

== Participating nations ==
- Bahrain
- Bangladesh
- Brunei
- Bhutan
- Cambodia
- Guam
- Iraq
- Kuwait
- Kyrgyzstan
- Laos
- Maldives
- Mongolia
- Singapore
- Sri Lanka
- Turkmenistan
- Yemen

== Withdrawn/inactive nations ==
- Macau
- Myanmar
- Oman
- Philippines
- Qatar
- Tajikistan

== Draw ==
Date: 8–13 August 2022 and 17–22 October 2022

Location: Sri Lanka Tennis Association Courts, Colombo, Sri Lanka (clay) and Bahrain Tennis Federation, Isa Town, Bahrain (hard)

Format: Round-robin basis. In Colombo, one pool of three teams and one pool of four teams. The winners of each pool will play-off against each other to determine the nation promoted to Asia/Oceania Group III in 2023. In Isa Town, two pools of five teams. The winners of each pool will play-off against each other to determine the nation promoted to Asia/Oceania Group III in 2023.

=== Seeding ===
Colombo

Pot	Nation	Rank^{1}	Seed
1	Sri Lanka	106	1
1	Iraq	112	2
2	Kyrgyzstan	113	3
2	Yemen	132	4
3	Bangladesh	137	5
3	Brunei	NR	–
3	Maldives	NR	–

- ^{1}Davis Cup Rankings as of 7 March 2022

Isa Town

Pot	Nation	Rank^{1}	Seed
1	Turkmenistan	125	1
1	Kuwait	133	2
2	Cambodia	135	3
2	Bahrain	140	4
3	Guam	144	5
3	Mongolia	145	6
4	Singapore	149	7
4	Bhutan	NR	–
4	Laos	NR	–

- ^{1}Davis Cup Rankings as of 20 September 2022

=== Round Robin ===
==== Pool A (Colombo) ====
		SRI	KGZ	BAN	RR; W–L	Set; W–L	Game; W–L	Standings
1	Sri Lanka		3–0	3–0	2-0	12–0 (100%)	73–26 (74%)	1
3	Kyrgyzstan	0–3		3–0	1–1	6–7 (46%)	57–51 (53%)	2
5	Bangladesh	0–3	0–3		0–2	1–12 (8%)	22–75 (23%)	3

==== Pool B (Colombo) ====
		IRQ	BRU	YEM	MDV	RR; W–L	Set; W–L	Game; W–L	Standings
2	Iraq		3–0	2–1	3–0	3–0	17–3 (85%)	110–46 (71%)	1
–	Brunei	0–3		2–1	2–1	2–1	9–10 (47%)	75–78 (49%)	2
4	Yemen	1–2	1–2		2–1	1–2	8–11 (42%)	79–91 (46%)	3
–	Maldives	0–3	1–2	1–2		0–3	5–15 (25%)	55–104 (35%)	4

==== Pool A (Isa Town) ====
		CAM	TKM	BHU	MGL	RR; W–L	Set; W–L	Game; W–L	Standings
3	Cambodia		2–1	3–0	3–0	3–0	17–2 (89%)	112–43 (72%)	1
1	Turkmenistan	1–2		3–0	3–0	2–1	14–5 (74%)	92–68 (57%)	2
–	Bhutan	0–3	0–3		2–1	1–2	4–15 (21%)	52–102 (34%)	3
6	Mongolia	0–3	0–3	1–2		0–3	3–16 (16%)	64–107 (37%)	4

==== Pool B (Isa Town) ====
		SGP	KUW	GUM	LAO	BRN	RR; W–L	Set; W–L	Game; W–L	Standings
7	Singapore		3–0	3–0	3–0	3–0	4–0	24–4 (86%)	160–70 (70%)	1
2	Kuwait	0–3		3–0	3–0	3–0	3–1	21–7 (75%)	141–95 (60%)	2
5	Guam	0–3	0–3		2–1	3–0	2–2	12–16 (43%)	124–126 (50%)	3
–	Laos	0–3	0–3	1–2		2–1	1–3	8–18 (31%)	93–136 (41%)	4
4	Bahrain	0–3	0–3	0–3	1–2		0–4	3–23 (12%)	62–153 (29%)	5

Standings are determined by: 1. number of wins; 2. number of matches; 3. in two-team ties, head-to-head records; 4. in three-team ties, (a) percentage of sets won (head-to-head records if two teams remain tied), then (b) percentage of games won (head-to-head records if two teams remain tied), then (c) Davis Cup rankings.

=== Playoffs ===
Placing (Colombo)	A Team	Score	B Team
Promotion	Sri Lanka	2–0	Iraq
3rd–4th	Kyrgyzstan	2–0	Brunei
5th–6th	Bangladesh	2–1	Yemen
7th	—		Maldives

Placing (Isa Town)	A Team	Score	B Team
Promotion	Cambodia	2–1	Singapore
3rd–4th	Turkmenistan	0–3	Kuwait
5th–6th	Bhutan	0–3	Guam
7th–8th	Mongolia	1–2	Laos
9th	—		Bahrain

- Sri Lanka and Cambodia were promoted to 2023 Davis Cup Asia/Oceania Zone Group III.

== Round Robin ==
=== Pool A (Colombo) ===
==== Sri Lanka vs. Bangladesh ====
Sri Lanka
3
Sri Lanka Tennis Association Courts, Colombo, Sri Lanka
8 August 2022
Clay

Bangladesh
0

			1	2	3
1	(Sri Lanka) (Bangladesh)	Yasitha de Silva; Ranjan Ram	6; 3	6; 0
2	(Sri Lanka) (Bangladesh)	Harshana Godamanna; Md Rubel Hossain	6; 1	6; 3
3	(Sri Lanka) (Bangladesh)	Chathurya Nilaweera / Thehan Sanjaya Wijemanne; Md Kawsar Ali / Md Juel Rana	6; 0	6; 1

==== Kyrgyzstan vs. Bangladesh ====
Kyrgyzstan
3
Sri Lanka Tennis Association Courts, Colombo, Sri Lanka
10 August 2022
Clay

Bangladesh
0

			1	2	3
1	(Kyrgyzstan) (Bangladesh)	Ilgiz Kamchibekov; Ranjan Ram	3; 6	5; 0		retired
2	(Kyrgyzstan) (Bangladesh)	Mirgiiaz Mirdzhaliev; Md Rubel Hossain	6; 0	6; 4
3	(Kyrgyzstan) (Bangladesh)	Evgeniy Babak / Mirgiiaz Mirdzhaliev; Md Rubel Hossain / Md Juel Rana	6; 2	6; 2

==== Sri Lanka vs. Kyrgyzstan ====
Sri Lanka
3
Sri Lanka Tennis Association Courts, Colombo, Sri Lanka
11 August 2022
Clay

Kyrgyzstan
0

			1	2	3
1	(Sri Lanka) (Kyrgyzstan)	Yasitha de Silva; Ilgiz Kamchibekov	7^{8} 6^{6}	6; 0
2	(Sri Lanka) (Kyrgyzstan)	Harshana Godamanna; Mirgiiaz Mirdzhaliev	6; 4	6; 2
3	(Sri Lanka) (Kyrgyzstan)	Chathurya Nilaweera / Thehan Sanjaya Wijemanne; Evgeniy Babak / Mirgiiaz Mirdzhaliev	6; 4	6; 2

=== Pool B (Colombo) ===
==== Iraq vs. Brunei ====
Iraq
3
Sri Lanka Tennis Association Courts, Colombo, Sri Lanka
8 August 2022
Clay

Brunei
0

			1	2	3
1	(Iraq) (Brunei)	Abdullah Ali Hatem Ghrairi; Billie Kee-Loong Wong	6; 4	6; 2
2	(Iraq) (Brunei)	Adil Mustafa Al-Saedi; Aiman Abdullah	6; 1	6; 4
3	(Iraq) (Brunei)	Mohammed Al-Shammari / Abdullah Ali Hatem Ghrairi; Lim Chung-peng / Gavin Yeung Kok Lim	6; 0	6; 0

==== Yemen vs. Maldives ====
Yemen
2
Sri Lanka Tennis Association Courts, Colombo, Sri Lanka
8 August 2022
Clay

Maldives
1

			1	2	3
1	(Yemen) (Maldives)	Halil Sallam; Alham Shiyam	4; 6	3; 6
2	(Yemen) (Maldives)	Ghassan Alansi; Abdulla Faaih Fazeel	6; 4	6; 4
3	(Yemen) (Maldives)	Ghassan Alansi / Halil Sallam; Mohammed Fazeeh / Hussain Nasif	6; 4	6; 2

==== Iraq vs. Maldives ====
Iraq
3
Sri Lanka Tennis Association Courts, Colombo, Sri Lanka
9 August 2022
Clay

Maldives
0

			1	2	3
1	(Iraq) (Maldives)	Abdullah Ali Hatem Ghrairi; Aiham Shiyam	6; 0	6; 0
2	(Iraq) (Maldives)	Adel Mustafa Al-Saedi; Abdulla Faaih Fazeel	5; 7	6; 2	2; 0	retired
3	(Iraq) (Maldives)	Mohammed Al-Shammari / Abdullah Ali Hatem Ghrairi; Hussain Nasif / Aiham Shiyam	6; 0	6; 0

==== Yemen vs. Brunei ====
Yemen
1
Sri Lanka Tennis Association Courts, Colombo, Sri Lanka
10 August 2022
Clay

Brunei
2

			1	2	3
1	(Yemen) (Brunei)	Halil Sallam; Billie Kee-Loong Wong	0; 6	1; 6
2	(Yemen) (Brunei)	Ghassan Alansi; Aiman Abdullah	6; 3	6; 4
3	(Yemen) (Brunei)	Ghassan Alansi / Halil Sallam; Aiman Abdullah / Billie Kee-Loong Wong	4; 6	5; 7

==== Iraq vs. Yemen ====
Iraq
2
Sri Lanka Tennis Association Courts, Colombo, Sri Lanka
11 August 2022
Clay

Yemen
1

			1	2	3
1	(Iraq) (Yemen)	Abdullah Ali Hatem Ghrairi; Alhassan Ishaq	6; 1	6; 0
2	(Iraq) (Yemen)	Adil Mustafa Al-Saedi; Ghassan Alansi	6; 4	1; 6	1; 6
3	(Iraq) (Yemen)	Mohammed Al-Shammari / Abdullah Ali Hatem Ghrairi; Ghassan Alansi / Halil Sallam	7; 5	6; 4

==== Maldives vs. Brunei ====
Maldives
1
Sri Lanka Tennis Association Courts, Colombo, Sri Lanka
11 August 2022
Clay

Brunei
2

			1	2	3
1	(Maldives) (Brunei)	Aiham Shiyam; Billie Kee-Loong Wong	1; 6	1; 6
2	(Maldives) (Brunei)	Abdulla Faaih Fazeel; Aiman Abdullah	6; 1	2; 6	6; 1
3	(Maldives) (Brunei)	Abdulla Faaih Fazeel / Hussain Nasif; Aiman Abdullah / Billie Kee-Loong Wong	0; 6	4; 6

=== Pool A (Isa Town) ===
==== Cambodia vs. Bhutan ====
Cambodia
3
Bahrain Tennis Federation, Isa Town, Bahrain
17 October 2022
Hard

Bhutan
0

			1	2	3
1	(Cambodia) (Bhutan)	Mathew Krusling; Tenzin Singye Dorji	7^{7} 6^{2}	6; 3
2	(Cambodia) (Bhutan)	Bun Kenny; Tandin Wangchuk	6; 0	6; 0
3	(Cambodia) (Bhutan)	Long Samneang / Timothy Tep; Nidup Gyeltshen / Pema Norbu	6; 0	1; 0		retired

==== Turkmenistan vs. Bhutan ====
Turkmenistan
3
Bahrain Tennis Federation, Isa Town, Bahrain
18 October 2022
Hard

Bhutan
0

			1	2	3
1	(Turkmenistan) (Bhutan)	Yuriy Rogusskiy; Nidup Gyeltshen	6; 2	6; 0
2	(Turkmenistan) (Bhutan)	Meylis Orazmuhamedow; Pema Norbu	6; 2	6; 0
3	(Turkmenistan) (Bhutan)	Gurbanberdi Gurbanberdiyev / Yuriy Rogusskiy; Tenzin Singye Dorji / Tandin Wangchuk	6; 4	6; 2

==== Cambodia vs. Mongolia ====
Cambodia
3
Bahrain Tennis Federation, Isa Town, Bahrain
18 October 2022
Hard

Mongolia
0

			1	2	3
1	(Cambodia) (Mongolia)	Long Samneang; Undrakh Purevdorj	6; 3	6; 3
2	(Cambodia) (Mongolia)	Bun Kenny; Gunburd Batjargal	6; 0	6; 0
3	(Cambodia) (Mongolia)	Khleang Ponlok / Mathew Krusling; Khatansuikh Batbayar / Gunburd Batjargal	7; 5	6; 4

==== Turkmenistan vs. Mongolia ====
Turkmenistan
3
Bahrain Tennis Federation, Isa Town, Bahrain
19 October 2022
Hard

Mongolia
0

			1	2	3
1	(Turkmenistan) (Mongolia)	Yuriy Rogusskiy; Undrakh Purevdorj	6; 4	6; 3
2	(Turkmenistan) (Mongolia)	Meylis Orazmuhamedow; Khatansuikh Batbayar	6; 1	6; 2
3	(Turkmenistan) (Mongolia)	Meylis Orazmuhamedow / Yuriy Rogusskiy; Gunburd Batjargal / Undrakh Purevdorj	6; 4	7^{7} 6^{4}

==== Turkmenistan vs. Cambodia ====
Turkmenistan
1
Bahrain Tennis Federation, Isa Town, Bahrain
20 October 2022
Hard

Cambodia
2

			1	2	3
1	(Turkmenistan) (Cambodia)	Yuriy Rogusskiy; Long Samneang	3; 6	7; 5	6; 3
2	(Turkmenistan) (Cambodia)	Meylis Orazmuhamedow; Bun Kenny	1; 6	0; 6
3	(Turkmenistan) (Cambodia)	Meylis Orazmuhamedow / Yuriy Rogusskiy; Bun Kenny / Mathew Krusling	1; 6	1; 6

==== Mongolia vs. Bhutan ====
Mongolia
1
Bahrain Tennis Federation, Isa Town, Bahrain
20 October 2022
Hard

Bhutan
2

			1	2	3
1	(Mongolia) (Bhutan)	Undrakh Purevdorj; Tenzin Singye Dorji	6; 3	6; 3
2	(Mongolia) (Bhutan)	Khatansuikh Batbayar; Tandin Wangchuk	2; 6	2; 6
3	(Mongolia) (Bhutan)	Gunburd Batjargal / Undrakh Purevdorj; Tenzin Singye Dorji / Tandin Wangchuk	6; 3	3; 6	4; 6

=== Pool B (Isa Town) ===
==== Kuwait vs. Guam ====
Kuwait
3
Bahrain Tennis Federation, Isa Town, Bahrain
17 October 2022
Hard

Guam
0

			1	2	3
1	(Kuwait) (Guam)	Essa Qabazard; Derek Okuhama	6; 2	6; 2
2	(Kuwait) (Guam)	Bader Alabdullah; Camden Camacho	6; 1	6; 1
3	(Kuwait) (Guam)	Bader Alabdullah / Essa Qabazard; Camden Camacho / Daniel Llarenas	7^{7} 6^{5}	1; 6	7^{7} 6^{4}

==== Bahrain vs. Singapore ====
Bahrain
0
Bahrain Tennis Federation, Isa Town, Bahrain
17 October 2022
Hard

Singapore
3

			1	2	3
1	(Bahrain) (Singapore)	Hamad Abdulaal; Shaheed Alam	0; 6	0; 6
2	(Bahrain) (Singapore)	Faris Abdulhusain Abdulkarim Al Toobli; Roy Hobbs	1; 6	1; 6
3	(Bahrain) (Singapore)	Hamad Abdulaal / Youssef Ashraf; Michael Dylan Jimenez / Ethan Kai Xin Lye	1; 6	3; 6

==== Kuwait vs. Laos ====
Kuwait
3
Bahrain Tennis Federation, Isa Town, Bahrain
18 October 2022
Hard

Laos
0

			1	2	3
1	(Kuwait) (Laos)	Essa Qabazard; Sataporn Simmalavong	6; 1	6; 4
2	(Kuwait) (Laos)	Bader Alabdullah; Vitaya Rasavady	6; 1	6; 3
3	(Kuwait) (Laos)	Ali Alshati / Essa Qabazard; Xaysavath Chansomphou / Somphone Songbandith	6; 4	6; 0

==== Bahrain vs. Guam ====
Bahrain
0
Bahrain Tennis Federation, Isa Town, Bahrain
18 October 2022
Hard

Guam
3

			1	2	3
1	(Bahrain) (Guam)	Essa Alqattan; Derek Okuhama	1; 6	0; 6
2	(Bahrain) (Guam)	Youssef Ashraf; Camden Camacho	1; 6	1; 6
3	(Bahrain) (Guam)	Faris Abdulhusain Abdulkarim Al Toobli / Essa Alqattan; Mason Caldwell / Derek Okuhama	1; 6	7^{7} 6^{3}	3; 6

==== Kuwait vs. Singapore ====
Kuwait
0
Bahrain Tennis Federation, Isa Town, Bahrain
19 October 2022
Hard

Singapore
3

			1	2	3
1	(Kuwait) (Singapore)	Essa Qabazard; Shaheed Alam	6; 3	3; 6	3; 6
2	(Kuwait) (Singapore)	Bader Alabdullah; Roy Hobbs	6; 3	3; 6	1; 6
3	(Kuwait) (Singapore)	Ali Alshati / Yaqoub Mohammed; Michael Dylan Jimenez / Ethan Kai Xin Lye	6; 4	1; 6	1; 6

==== Guam vs. Laos ====
Guam
2
Bahrain Tennis Federation, Isa Town, Bahrain
19 October 2022
Hard

Laos
1

			1	2	3
1	(Guam) (Laos)	Derek Okuhama; Sataporn Simmalavong	4; 6	2; 6
2	(Guam) (Laos)	Camden Camacho; Vitaya Rasavady	6; 2	6; 4
3	(Guam) (Laos)	Camden Camacho / Daniel Llarenas; Vitaya Rasavady / Sataporn Simmalavong	3; 6	7^{7} 6^{1}	1; 1	retired

==== Kuwait vs. Bahrain ====
Kuwait
3
Bahrain Tennis Federation, Isa Town, Bahrain
20 October 2022
Hard

Bahrain
0

			1	2	3
1	(Kuwait) (Bahrain)	Ali Alshati; Youssef Ashraf	6; 3	6; 1
2	(Kuwait) (Bahrain)	Essa Qabazard; Faris Abdulhusain Abdulkarim Al Toobli	6; 3	6; 2
3	(Kuwait) (Bahrain)	Bader Alabdullah / Ali Alshati; Faris Abdulhusain Abdulkarim Al Toobli / Essa Alqattan	6; 2	6; 1

==== Singapore vs. Laos ====
Singapore
3
Bahrain Tennis Federation, Isa Town, Bahrain
20 October 2022
Hard

Laos
0

			1	2	3
1	(Singapore) (Laos)	Shaheed Alam; Somphone Songbandith	6; 0	6; 2
2	(Singapore) (Laos)	Roy Hobbs; Xaysavath Chansomphou	6; 4	6; 0
3	(Singapore) (Laos)	Michael Dylan Jimenez / Ethan Kai Xin Lye; Vitaya Rasavady / Somphone Songbandith	6; 1	6; 3

==== Bahrain vs. Laos ====
Bahrain
1
Bahrain Tennis Federation, Isa Town, Bahrain
21 October 2022
Hard

Laos
2

			1	2	3
1	(Bahrain) (Laos)	Hamad Abdulaal; Sataporn Simmalavong	2; 6	4; 6
2	(Bahrain) (Laos)	Faris Abdulhusain Abdulkarim Al Toobli; Vitaya Rasavady	1; 6	4; 6
3	(Bahrain) (Laos)	Essa Alqattan / Youssef Ashraf; Xaysavath Chansomphou / Somphone Songbandith	7^{7} 6^{2}	6^{6} 7^{8}	6; 2

==== Guam vs. Singapore ====
Guam
0
Bahrain Tennis Federation, Isa Town, Bahrain
21 October 2022
Hard

Singapore
3

			1	2	3
1	(Guam) (Singapore)	Mason Caldwell; Shaheed Alam	1; 6	1; 6
2	(Guam) (Singapore)	Camden Camacho; Roy Hobbs	6; 4	5; 7	2; 6
3	(Guam) (Singapore)	Mason Caldwell / Daniel Llarenas; Shaheed Alam / Ethan Kai Xin Lye	6^{2} 7^{7}	3; 6

== Play-offs ==
=== Promotion play-off ===
==== Sri Lanka vs. Iraq ====
Sri Lanka
2
Sri Lanka Tennis Association Courts, Colombo, Sri Lanka
13 August 2022
Clay

Iraq
0

			1	2	3
1	(Sri Lanka) (Iraq)	Yasitha de Silva; Abdullah Ali Hatem Ghrairi	6; 4	6; 2
2	(Sri Lanka) (Iraq)	Harshana Godamanna; Adil Mustafa Al-Saedi	6; 3	6; 2
3	(Sri Lanka) (Iraq)	Chathurya Nilaweera / Thehan Sanjaya Wijemanne; Mohammed Al-Shammari / Abdullah Ali Hatem Ghrairi				not played

==== Cambodia vs. Singapore ====
Cambodia
2
Bahrain Tennis Federation, Isa Town, Bahrain
22 October 2022
Hard

Singapore
1

			1	2	3
1	(Cambodia) (Singapore)	Mathew Krusling; Shaheed Alam	1; 6	6; 2	4; 6
2	(Cambodia) (Singapore)	Bun Kenny; Roy Hobbs	6; 3	6; 3
3	(Cambodia) (Singapore)	Bun Kenny / Mathew Krusling; Shaheed Alam / Ethan Kai Xin Lye	7^{7} 6^{4}	6; 2

=== 3rd place play-off ===
==== Kyrgyzstan vs. Brunei ====
Kyrgyzstan
2
Sri Lanka Tennis Association Courts, Colombo, Sri Lanka
13 August 2022
Clay

Brunei
0

			1	2	3
1	(Kyrgyzstan) (Brunei)	Ilgiz Kamchibekov; Billie Kee-Loong Wong	6; 4	5; 7	6; 1
2	(Kyrgyzstan) (Brunei)	Mirgiiaz Mirdzhaliev; Aiman Abdullah	6; 0	6; 0
3	(Kyrgyzstan) (Brunei)	Evgeniy Babak / Mirgiiaz Mirdzhaliev; Aiman Abdullah / Billie Kee-Loong Wong				not played

==== Turkmenistan vs. Kuwait ====
Turkmenistan
0
Bahrain Tennis Federation, Isa Town, Bahrain
22 October 2022
Hard

Kuwait
3

			1	2	3
1	(Turkmenistan) (Kuwait)	Yuriy Rogusskiy; Essa Qabazard	6; 4	2; 6	2; 6
2	(Turkmenistan) (Kuwait)	Meylis Orazmuhamedow; Bader Alabdullah	5; 7	3; 6
3	(Turkmenistan) (Kuwait)	Gurbanberdi Gurbanberdiyev / Atlymyrat Gurbanov; Ali Alshati / Yaqoub Mohammed	6^{1} 7^{7}	6^{3} 7^{7}

=== 5th place play-off ===
==== Bangladesh vs. Yemen ====
Bangladesh
2
Sri Lanka Tennis Association Courts, Colombo, Sri Lanka
13 August 2022
Clay

Yemen
1

			1	2	3
1	(Bangladesh) (Yemen)	Md Rubel Hossain; Halil Sallam	6; 0	6; 0
2	(Bangladesh) (Yemen)	Md Kawsar Ali; Ghassan Alansi	5; 7	0; 6
3	(Bangladesh) (Yemen)	Md Rubel Hossain / Ranjan Ram; Ghassan Alansi / Halil Sallam	6; 2	6; 2

==== Bhutan vs. Guam ====
Bhutan
0
Bahrain Tennis Federation, Isa Town, Bahrain
22 October 2022
Hard

Guam
3

			1	2	3
1	(Bhutan) (Guam)	Nidup Gyeltshen; Daniel Llarenas	1; 6	4; 6
2	(Bhutan) (Guam)	Pema Norbu; Camden Camacho	0; 6	0; 6
3	(Bhutan) (Guam)	Tenzin Singye Dorji / Tandin Wangchuk; Mason Caldwell / Derek Okuhama	4; 6	5; 7

=== 7th place play-off ===
==== Mongolia vs. Laos ====
Mongolia
1
Bahrain Tennis Federation, Isa Town, Bahrain
22 October 2022
Hard

Laos
2

			1	2	3
1	(Mongolia) (Laos)	Undrakh Purevdorj; Somphone Songbandith	6; 4	6; 2
2	(Mongolia) (Laos)	Gunburd Batjargal; Sataporn Simmalavong	1; 6	1; 6
3	(Mongolia) (Laos)	Khatansuikh Batbayar / Undrakh Purevdorj; Vitaya Rasavady / Sataporn Simmalavong	0; 6	1; 6
