= 2018 Davis Cup =

2018 edition of the Davis Cup

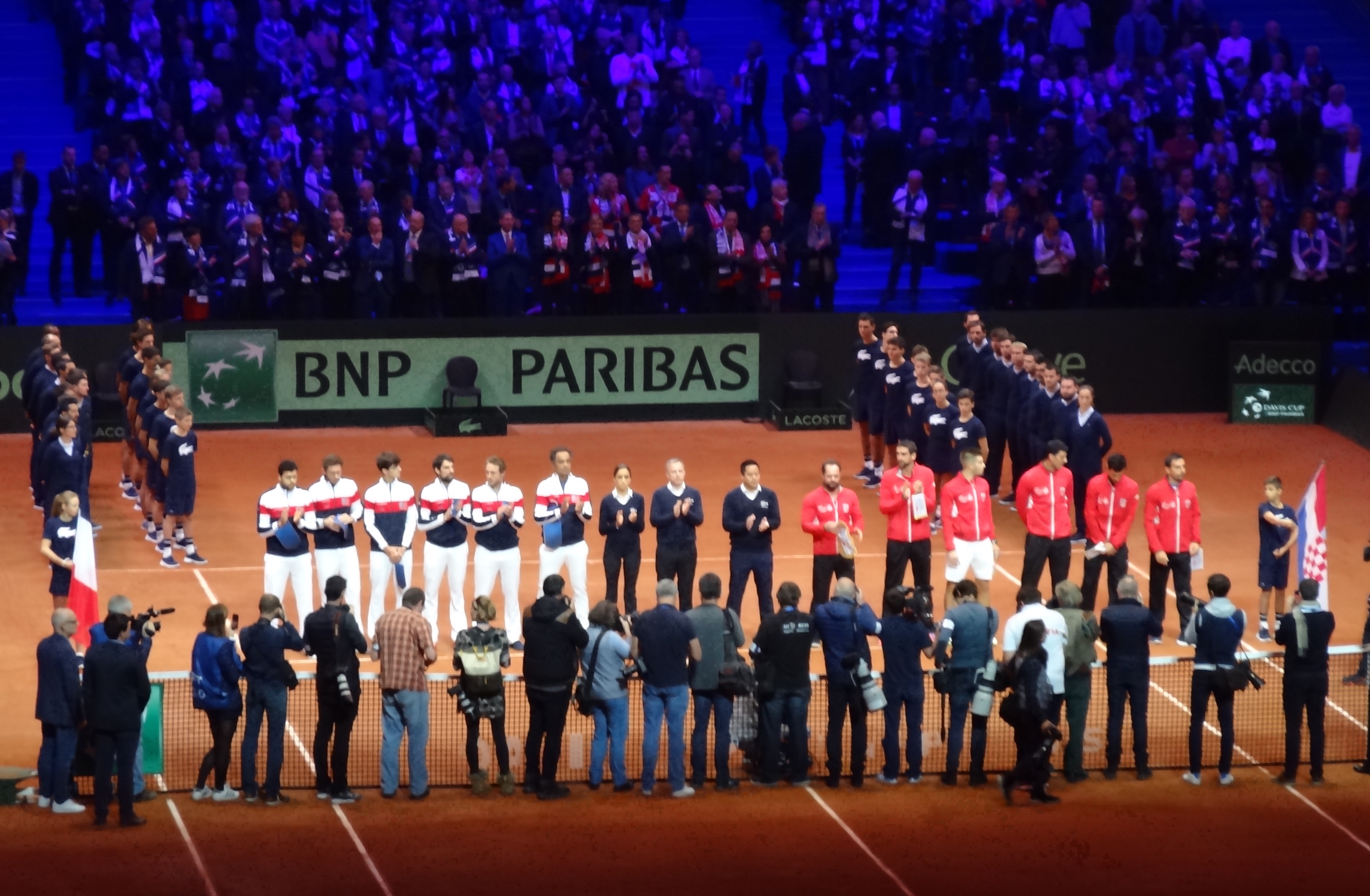
- France and Croatia during the final

Details
- Duration: 2 February – 25 November 2018
- Edition: 107th

Champion
- Winning nation: Croatia

The 2018 Davis Cup was the 107th edition of the Davis Cup, a tournament between national teams in men's tennis. It was sponsored by BNP Paribas. In 2018, new rules were introduced for the Group I and II zonal events, with ties now being played as best-of-three sets over the course of two days.

Croatia won their second Davis Cup on indoor clay in the final match held at 25 November with a 3–1 win over France.

Guam made its first appearance in the tournament.

== World Group ==
Participating teams
Australia	Belgium	Canada	Croatia
France	Germany	Great Britain	Hungary
Italy	Japan	Kazakhstan	Netherlands
Serbia	Spain	Switzerland	United States

=== Seeds ===
1. France (final)
2. Belgium (quarterfinals)
3. Great Britain (first round)
4. Croatia (champion)
5. Switzerland (first round)
6. Australia (first round)
7. Serbia (first round)
8. Italy (quarterfinals)

=== Draw ===
First round 2–4 February
Albertville, France (indoor hard)
1	France	3
Netherlands	1
Morioka, Japan (indoor hard)
8	Italy	3
Japan	1
Marbella, Spain (clay)
3	Great Britain	1
Spain	3
Brisbane, Australia (hard)
6	Australia	1
Germany	3
Astana, Kazakhstan (indoor hard)
Kazakhstan	4
5	Switzerland	1
Osijek, Croatia (indoor clay)
Canada	1
4	Croatia	3
Niš, Serbia (indoor clay)
United States	3
7	Serbia	1
Liège, Belgium (indoor hard)
Hungary	2
2	Belgium	3

Quarterfinals; 6–8 April
Genoa, Italy (clay)
1	France	3
8	Italy	1
Valencia, Spain (clay)
Spain	3
Germany	2
Varaždin, Croatia (indoor clay)
Kazakhstan	1
4	Croatia	3
Nashville, United States (indoor hard)
United States	4
2	Belgium	0

Semifinals; 14–16 September
Lille, France (indoor hard)
1	France	3
Spain	2
Zadar, Croatia (clay)
4	Croatia	3
United States	2

Final; 23–25 November
Lille, France (indoor clay)
1	France	1
4	Croatia	3

=== Final ===
France
1
Stade Pierre-Mauroy, Lille, France
23–25 November
Clay (i)

Croatia
3

			1	2	3	4	5
1	(France) (Croatia)	Jérémy Chardy; Borna Ćorić	2; 6	5; 7	4; 6
2	(France) (Croatia)	Jo-Wilfried Tsonga; Marin Čilić	3; 6	5; 7	4; 6
3	(France) (Croatia)	Nicolas Mahut / Pierre-Hugues Herbert; Ivan Dodig / Mate Pavić	6; 4	6; 4	3; 6	7^{7} 6^{3}
4	(France) (Croatia)	Lucas Pouille; Marin Čilić	6^{3} 7^{7}	3; 6	3; 6
5	(France) (Croatia)	Jo-Wilfried Tsonga; Borna Ćorić						not played

== World Group play-offs ==
Date: 14–16 September 2018

The eight losing teams in the World Group first round ties and eight winners of the Zonal Group I final round ties will compete in the World Group play-offs for seeded spots in the 2019 Qualifying Round. Seedings are based on Davis Cup rankings as of 9 April 2018.

Seeded teams

1. Argentina
2. Great Britain
3. Australia
4. Switzerland
5. Serbia
6. Canada
7. Czech Republic
8. Japan

Unseeded teams

- Austria
- Bosnia and Herzegovina
- Colombia
- Hungary
- India
- Netherlands
- Sweden
- Uzbekistan

Home team	Score	Visiting team	Location	Venue	Door	Surface
Argentina	4–0	Colombia	San Juan	Estadio Aldo Cantoni	Indoor	Clay
Great Britain	3–1	Uzbekistan	Glasgow	Commonwealth Arena	Indoor	Hard
Austria	3–1	Australia	Graz	Messe Congress Graz	Outdoor	Clay
Switzerland	2–3	Sweden	Biel/Bienne	Swiss Tennis Arena	Indoor	Hard
Serbia	4–0	India	Kraljevo	Kraljevo Sports Hall	Indoor	Clay
Canada	3–1	Netherlands	Toronto	Coca-Cola Coliseum	Indoor	Hard
Hungary	2–3	Czech Republic	Budapest	Kopaszi Dam	Outdoor	Clay
Japan	4–0	Bosnia and Herzegovina	Osaka	Utsubo Tennis Center	Outdoor	Hard

== Americas Zone ==
=== Group I ===
Seeds: The first seed received a bye into the second round.

1. Argentina
2. Brazil

Remaining nations:

- Barbados
- Chile
- Colombia
- Dominican Republic
- Ecuador

=== Draw ===
Second Round Play-offs
Saint Michael, Barbados (hard)
Ecuador	4
Barbados	0

First Round Play-offs
bye
Ecuador
Santo Domingo Este, Dominican Republic (hard)
Barbados	0
Dominican Republic	4

First Round
1	Argentina
bye
Santiago, Chile (clay)
Chile	3
Ecuador	1
Saint Michael, Barbados (hard)
Colombia	4
Barbados	0
Santo Domingo, Dominican Republic (hard)
Dominican Republic	2
2	Brazil	3

Second Round
San Juan, Argentina (indoor clay)
1	Argentina	3
Chile	2
Barranquilla, Colombia (hard)
Colombia	3
2	Brazil	2

- Barbados relegated to Group II in 2019.
- Argentina and Colombia advance to World Group Play-off.

=== Group II ===
Seeds:

1. Venezuela
2. Peru
3. El Salvador
4. Mexico

Remaining nations:

- Bolivia
- Guatemala
- Puerto Rico
- Uruguay

=== Draw ===
Play-offs
Guatemala City, Guatemala (hard)
Guatemala	3
3	El Salvador	1
Trinidad, Bolivia (clay)
Puerto Rico	0
Bolivia	5

First Round
Guatemala City, Guatemala (hard)
1	Venezuela	3
Guatemala	1
San Salvador, El Salvador (hard)
3	El Salvador	1
Uruguay	4
Tijuana, Mexico (hard)
Puerto Rico	0
4	Mexico	5
La Paz, Bolivia (clay)
Bolivia	1
2	Peru	4

Second Round
Montevideo, Uruguay (clay)
1	Venezuela	1
Uruguay	4
Metepec, Mexico (hard)
4	Mexico	3
2	Peru	1

Third Round
Montevideo, Uruguay (clay)
Uruguay	3
4	Mexico	1

- El Salvador and Puerto Rico relegated to Group III in 2019.
- Uruguay promoted to Group I in 2019.

=== Group III ===
Date: 28 May–2 June

Location: Costa Rica Country Club, Escazú, Costa Rica (hard)

Format: Round-robin basis. The winner of Pool A will play-off against the runner-up of Pool B and the winner of Pool B will play-off against the runner-up of Pool A to determine which two nations will advance to Americas Zone Group II in 2019.

Participating teams

Pool A

- Costa Rica
- Cuba
- Panama
- Paraguay

Pool B

- Antigua and Barbuda
- Bahamas
- Bermuda
- Honduras
- Jamaica

Inactive Teams

- Aruba
- Eastern Caribbean
- Haiti
- Saint Lucia
- Trinidad and Tobago
- U.S. Virgin Islands

==== Play-offs ====
- Bahamas and Honduras promoted to Group II in 2019.

== Asia/Oceania Zone ==
=== Group I ===
Seeds: All seeds received a bye into the second round.

1. India
2. Uzbekistan

Remaining nations:

- China
- New Zealand
- Pakistan
- South Korea

=== Draw ===
Second Round Play-offs
Gimcheon, South Korea (indoor hard)
New Zealand	2
South Korea	3

First Round Play-offs
bye
New Zealand
South Korea
bye

First Round
1	India
bye
Tianjin, China (indoor hard)
China	3
New Zealand	1
Islamabad, Pakistan (grass)
Pakistan	4
South Korea	0
bye
2	Uzbekistan

Second Round
Tianjin, China (hard)
1	India	3
China	2
Islamabad, Pakistan (grass)
Pakistan	1
2	Uzbekistan	4

- New Zealand relegated to Group II in 2019.
- India and Uzbekistan advance to World Group Play-off.

=== Group II ===
Seeds:

1. Thailand
2. Chinese Taipei
3. Hong Kong
4. Philippines

Remaining nations:

- Indonesia
- Iran
- Lebanon
- Sri Lanka

=== Draw ===
Play-offs
Colombo, Sri Lanka (clay)
Sri Lanka	1
Indonesia	3
Taipei, Taiwan (indoor hard)
Iran	0
2	Chinese Taipei	4

First Round
Colombo, Sri Lanka (clay)
1	Thailand	3
Sri Lanka	2
Jakarta, Indonesia (indoor hard)
3	Philippines	4
Indonesia	1
Causeway Bay, Hong Kong (hard)
Iran	0
4	Hong Kong	4
Beirut, Lebanon (indoor hard)
Lebanon	3
2	Chinese Taipei	2

Second Round
Manila, Philippines (indoor clay)
1	Thailand	4
3	Philippines	1
Zouk Mosbeh, Lebanon (hard)
4	Hong Kong	1
Lebanon	3

Third Round
Nonthaburi, Thailand (hard)
1	Thailand	2
Lebanon	3

- Sri Lanka and Iran relegated to Group III in 2019.
- Lebanon promoted to Group I in 2019.

=== Group III ===
Date: 2–7 April

Location: Mỹ Đình Sports Complex, Hanoi, Vietnam (indoor hard)

Format: Round-robin basis. One pool of 4 teams (Pool A) and one pool of 5 teams (Pool B). The winner of Pool A will play-off against the runner-up of Pool B and the winner of Pool B will play-off against the runner-up of Pool A to determine which two nations will be promoted to Asia/Oceania Zone Group II in 2019.

Participating teams

Pool A

- Cambodia
- Malaysia
- Pacific Oceania
- Vietnam

Pool B

- Jordan
- Kuwait
- Qatar
- Saudi Arabia
- Syria

==== Play-offs ====
- Vietnam and Kuwait promoted to Group II in 2019.
- Cambodia and Jordan relegated to Group IV in 2019.

=== Group IV ===
Date: 29 January–3 February

Location: Sultan Qaboos Sports Complex, Muscat, Oman (hard)

Format: Round-robin basis. Two pools of six teams. The winner of Pool A will play-off against the runner-up in Pool B and the winner of Pool B will play-off against the runner-up in Pool A to determine which two nations will be promoted to Asia/Oceania Zone Group III in 2019.

Participating teams

Pool A

- Bangladesh
- Iraq
- Kyrgyzstan
- Myanmar
- Oman
- United Arab Emirates

Pool B

- Bahrain
- Guam
- Mongolia
- Singapore
- Tajikistan
- Turkmenistan

Inactive Teams

- Brunei
- Yemen

==== Play-offs ====
- Oman and Singapore were promoted to Group III in 2019.

== Europe/Africa Zone ==
=== Group I ===
Seeds: All seeds and Bosnia and Herzegovina received a bye into the second round.

1. Czech Republic
2. Russia
3. Slovakia
4. Portugal

Remaining nations:

- Austria
- Belarus
- Bosnia and Herzegovina
- Israel
- South Africa
- Sweden
- Ukraine

=== Draw ===
Second Round Play-offs
Lisbon, Portugal (clay)
South Africa	0
4	Portugal	4
Bratislava, Slovakia (indoor clay)
3	Slovakia	3
Belarus	1

First Round Play-offs
bye
South Africa
Bucha, Ukraine (hard)
4	Portugal	1
Ukraine	3
bye
3	Slovakia
Moscow, Russia (indoor hard)
Belarus	2
2	Russia	3

First Round
1	Czech Republic
bye
Centurion, South Africa (hard)
South Africa	2
Israel	3
4	Portugal
bye
Dnipro, Ukraine (indoor hard)
Ukraine	2
Sweden	3
Bosnia and Herzegovina
bye
bye
3	Slovakia
Sankt Pölten, Austria (indoor clay)
Austria	5
Belarus	0
bye
2	Russia

Second Round
Ostrava, Czech Republic (indoor clay)
1	Czech Republic	3
Israel	1
Stockholm, Sweden (indoor hard)
4	Portugal	2
Sweden	3
Bratislava, Slovakia (indoor clay)
Bosnia and Herzegovina	3
3	Slovakia	2
Moscow, Russia (indoor hard)
Austria	3
2	Russia	1

- South Africa and Belarus relegated to Group II in 2019.
- Czech Republic, Sweden, Bosnia and Herzegovina, and Austria advance to World Group Play-off.

=== Group II ===
Seeds:

1. Romania
2. Lithuania
3. Denmark
4. Slovenia
5. Turkey
6. Norway
7. Finland
8. Georgia

Remaining nations:

- Egypt
- Estonia
- Ireland
- Luxembourg
- Morocco
- Poland
- Tunisia
- Zimbabwe

=== Draw ===
Relegation Play-offs
Esch-sur-Alzette, Lux. (indoor hard)
Luxembourg	5
8	Georgia	0
Portorož, Slovenia (clay)
4	Slovenia	3
5	Turkey	2
Oslo, Norway (indoor hard)
6	Norway	3
Ireland	1
Tallinn, Estonia (indoor hard)
Tunisia	2
Estonia	3

First Round
Piatra Neamț, Romania (indoor hard)
1	Romania	4
Luxembourg	1
Marrakesh, Morocco (clay)
8	Georgia	1
Morocco	3
Maribor, Slovenia (indoor hard)
4	Slovenia	2
Poland	3
Harare, Zimbabwe (hard)
5	Turkey	1
Zimbabwe	3
Sharm El Sheikh, Egypt (hard)
Egypt	4
6	Norway	0
Birkerød, Denmark (indoor hard)
Ireland	1
3	Denmark	4
Tunis, Tunisia (hard)
Tunisia	2
7	Finland	3
Šiauliai, Lithuania (indoor hard)
Estonia	1
2	Lithuania	3

Second Round
Cluj-Napoca, Romania (indoor hard)
1	Romania	5
Morocco	0
Sopot, Poland (indoor hard)
Poland	4
Zimbabwe	1
Gentofte, Denmark (indoor hard)
Egypt	3
3	Denmark	1
Helsinki, Finland (indoor hard)
7	Finland	3
2	Lithuania	2

Third Round
Cluj-Napoca, Romania (indoor clay)
1	Romania	2
Poland	3
Cairo, Egypt (clay)
Egypt	2
7	Finland	3

- Georgia, Turkey, Ireland, and Tunisia relegated to Group III in 2019.
- Poland and Finland promoted to Group I in 2019.

=== Group III Europe ===
Date: 3–7 April

Location 1: Tennis Club Lokomotiv, Plovdiv, Bulgaria (clay)
Location 2: Ulcinj Bellevue, Ulcinj, Montenegro (clay)

Format: Round-robin basis. Two pools of four teams at each venue. The winners of each pool play-off against each other to determine which nation will be promoted to Europe/Africa Zone Group II in 2019. Two promoted - one from each venue.

Participating teams

Pool A (Plovdiv)

- Albania
- Bulgaria
- Iceland
- Macedonia

Pool B (Plovdiv)

- Andorra
- Cyprus
- Monaco
- San Marino

Pool A (Ulcinj)

- Armenia
- Greece
- Latvia
- Montenegro

Pool B (Ulcinj)

- Kosovo
- Liechtenstein
- Malta
- Moldova

Inactive Team

- Azerbaijan

==== Play-offs ====
- Monaco and Montenegro were promoted to Group II in 2019.

=== Group III Africa ===
Date: 18–23 June

Location: Nairobi Club Ground, Nairobi, Kenya (clay)

Format: Round-robin basis. One pool of four teams (Pool A) and one pool of five teams (Pool B). The winners of each pool play-off against each other to determine which two nations are promoted to Europe/Africa Zone Group II in 2019.

Participating teams

Pool A

- Benin
- Cameroon
- Nigeria
- Rwanda

Pool B

- Algeria
- Kenya
- Mozambique
- Namibia
- Uganda

Inactive Teams

- Angola
- Botswana
- Burkina Faso
- Congo
- Djibouti
- Ethiopia
- Gabon
- Ghana
- Ivory Coast
- Lesotho
- Libya
- Madagascar
- Mali
- Mauritius
- Senegal
- Sudan
- Togo
- Zambia

==== Play-offs ====
- Kenya and Namibia were promoted to Group II in 2019.
