= Nepal Davis Cup team =

National sports team

Nepal
- Coach: Jitendra Pariyar
- ITF ranking: 121 ▲14
- Colors: Red and Blue
- First year: 2023
- Years played: 2+
- Ties played (W–L): 6 (5–1)
- Most total wins: Abhishek Bastola (7–1)
- Most singles wins: Abhishek Bastola (6–0)
- Most doubles wins: Pradip Khadka (2–1)
- Best doubles team: Abhishek Bastola/Pradip Khadka (1–0); Pradip Khadka/Aki Zuben Rawat (1–1)
- Most ties played: Abhishek Bastola (6); Pradip Khadka (6)
- Most years played: Abhishek Bastola (2); Pradip Khadka (2)

The Nepal men's national tennis team represents Nepal in international men's tennis competition in the Davis Cup, governed by the International Tennis Federation (ITF). The team is administered by the Nepal Tennis Association, the governing body for tennis in Nepal.

== History ==
Nepal made its debut in the Davis Cup in 2023, competing in the Asia/Oceania Zone Group V. The initial campaign took place in Bahrain, where the team finished 7th out of 10 nations.On October 25, Abhishek Bastola made history by becoming the first Nepali to win a Davis Cup match for Nepal, defeating Qatar’s #1 player, Mubarak Al-Harrasi, 7–6(2), 7–6(7).

In 2024, Nepal returned with an improved lineup and achieved promotion to Asia/Oceania Zone Group IV after defeating Bahrain 2–0 in the playoff round. This marked a significant milestone in Nepal’s tennis development.

== Current team (2025) ==
As of 2025, the following players have represented Nepal in Davis Cup competition:

- Pradip Khadka
- Pranab Manandhar
- Nishant Shrestha
- Aayushman Hajur Rana

== Performance Summary ==
Zone legend
World Group/Inter-Zonal/Challenge Round
World Group play-offs/Qualifying Play-offs
Continental Zone I
Continental Zone II
Continental Zone III
Continental Zone IV
Continental Zone V

Year	Zone	Final round	Final opponent	Score	Result
2023	Asia/Oceania Group V	Promotion play-off	Maldives	3–0	7th
2024	Asia/Oceania Group V	Promotion play-off	Bahrain	2–0	Promoted to Asia/Oceania Zone Group IV
2025	Asia/Oceania Group IV	Promotion play-off	TBD		

== See also ==
- Davis Cup
- Nepal Tennis Association
- Sport in Nepal
