= 2023 Davis Cup Asia/Oceania Zone Group V =

Davis Cup competition in 2023

The Asia/Oceania Zone was the unique zone within Group 5 of the regional Davis Cup competition in 2023. The zone's competition was held in round robin format in Isa Town, Bahrain from 25 to 28 October 2023.

== Participating nations ==
- Bahrain
- Bangladesh
- Bhutan
- Brunei
- Laos
- Macau
- Maldives
- Mongolia
- Myanmar
- Nepal
- Qatar
- Tajikistan
- Yemen

== Draw ==
Date: 25–28 October 2023

Location: Bahrain Tennis Federation, Isa Town, Bahrain (Hard)

Format: Round-robin basis. Three pools of three teams and one pool of four teams and nations will play each team once in their pool. Nations finishing first of each pool will enter promotional play-offs, with the first of Pool A facing the first of Pool D and the first of Pool B facing the first of Pool C, and the two winners will be promoted to Asia/Oceania Zone Group IV in 2024.

=== Seeding ===
| Pot | Nation | Rank^{1} | Seed |
|---|---|---|---|
| 1 | Bahrain | | |
| 1 | Yemen | | |
| 1 | Bangladesh | | |
| 1 | Brunei | | |
| 2 | Bhutan | | |
| 2 | Qatar | | |
| 2 | Mongolia | | |
| 2 | Laos | | |
| 3 | Myanmar | | |
| 3 | Nepal | | |
| 3 | Maldives | | |
| 3 | Tajikistan | | |
| 3 | Macau | | |

- ^{1}Davis Cup Rankings as of

=== Round Robin ===
==== Pool A ====
| | MYA | BHR | BHU | RR; W–L | Set; W–L | Game; W–L | Standings |
| Myanmar | | 2–1 | 3–0 | 2–0 | 5–1 (%) | – (%) | 1 |
| Bahrain | 1–2 | | 2–1 | 1–1 | 3–3 (%) | – (%) | 2 |
| Bhutan | 0–3 | 1–2 | | 0–2 | 1–5 (%) | – (%) | 3 |

==== Pool B ====
| | QAT | NEP | YEM | RR; W–L | Set; W–L | Game; W–L | Standings |
| Qatar | | 2–1 | 3–0 | 2–0 | 5–1 (%) | – (%) | 1 |
| Nepal | 1–2 | | 2–1 | 1–1 | 3–3 (%) | – (%) | 2 |
| Yemen | 0–3 | 1–2 | | 0–2 | 1–5 (%) | – (%) | 3 |

==== Pool C ====
| | MGL | MDV | BAN | RR; W–L | Set; W–L | Game; W–L | Standings |
| Mongolia | | 2–1 | 3–0 | 2–0 | 5–1 (%) | – (%) | 1 |
| Maldives | 1–2 | | 2–1 | 1–1 | 3–3 (%) | – (%) | 2 |
| Bangladesh | 0–3 | 1–2 | | 0–2 | 1–5 (%) | – (%) | 3 |

==== Pool D ====
| | LAO | BRU | MAC | TJK | RR; W–L | Set; W–L | Game; W–L | Standings |
| Laos | | 2–1 | 3–0 | 3–0 | 3–0 | 8–1 (%) | – (%) | 1 |
| Brunei | 1–2 | | 2–1 | 1–2 | 1–2 | 4–5 (%) | – (%) | 2 |
| Macau | 0–3 | 1–2 | | 2–1 | 1–2 | 3–6 (%) | – (%) | 3 |
| Tajikistan | 0–3 | 2–1 | 1–2 | | 1–2 | 3–6 (%) | – (%) | 4 |

Standings are determined by: 1. number of wins; 2. number of matches; 3. in two-team ties, head-to-head records; 4. in three-team ties, (a) percentage of sets won (head-to-head records if two teams remain tied), then (b) percentage of games won (head-to-head records if two teams remain tied), then (c) Davis Cup rankings.

=== Playoffs ===
| Placing | A Team | Score | B Team |
|---|---|---|---|
| Promotional | Myanmar | 2–1 | Laos |
| Promotional | Qatar | 3–0 | Mongolia |
| Fifth | Bahrain | 2–1 | Brunei |
| Seventh | Nepal | 3–0 | Maldives |
| Ninth | Bhutan | 1–2 | Macau |
| Eleventh | Yemen | 3–0 | Bangladesh |

- Myanmar and Qatar were promoted to 2024 Davis Cup Asia/Oceania Zone Group IV.

== Round Robin ==
=== Pool A ===
==== Bahrain vs. Myanmar ====
Bahrain
1
Bahrain Tennis Federation, Isa Town, Bahrain
25 October 2023
Hard

Myanmar
2

| | | | 1 | 2 | 3 |
|---|---|---|---|---|---|
| 1 | (Bahrain) (Myanmar) | Elyas Abdulnabi; Myu Paing Min | 6; 1 | 6; 3 |
| 2 | (Bahrain) (Myanmar) | Faris Al-Toobli; Hein Latt Kyaw | 1; 6 | 0; 6 |
| 3 | (Bahrain) (Myanmar) | Elyas Abdulnabi / Hasan Abdulnabi; Myu Paing Min / Aung Myo Thant | 6^{3} 7^{7} | 6; 4 | 4; 6 |

==== Bhutan vs. Myanmar ====
Bhutan
0
Bahrain Tennis Federation, Isa Town, Bahrain
26 October 2023
Hard

Myanmar
3

| | | | 1 | 2 | 3 |
|---|---|---|---|---|---|
| 1 | (Bhutan) (Myanmar) | Tenzin Singye Dorji; Hein Latt Kyaw | 6; 4 | 1; 6 | 3; 6 |
| 2 | (Bhutan) (Myanmar) | Tandin Wangchuk; Hein Htet Zaw | 6^{3} 7^{7} | 2; 6 |
| 3 | (Bhutan) (Myanmar) | Pema Norbu / Thinley Norbu; Myu Paing Min / Zaw San Oo | 1; 6 | 1; 6 |

==== Bahrain vs. Bhutan ====
Bahrain
2
Bahrain Tennis Federation, Isa Town, Bahrain
27 October 2023
Hard

Bhutan
1

| | | | 1 | 2 | 3 |
|---|---|---|---|---|---|
| 1 | (Bahrain) (Bhutan) | Shadi Kallel; Tenzin Singye Dorji | 5; 7 | 2; 6 |
| 2 | (Bahrain) (Bhutan) | Elyas Abdulnabi; Tandin Wangchuk | 7; 5 | 6; 4 |
| 3 | (Bahrain) (Bhutan) | Elyas Abdulnabi / Hasan Abdulnabi; Thinley Norbu / Tandin Wangchuk | 6; 3 | 6; 0 |

=== Pool B ===
==== Qatar vs. Nepal ====
Qatar
2
Bahrain Tennis Federation, Isa Town, Bahrain
25 October 2023
Hard

Nepal
1

| | | | 1 | 2 | 3 |
|---|---|---|---|---|---|
| 1 | (Qatar) (Nepal) | Rashed Naif; Pradip Khadka | 6; 1 | 6; 1 |
| 2 | (Qatar) (Nepal) | Mubarak Shannan Zayid Al-Harrasi; Abhishek Bastola | 6^{2} 7^{7} | 6^{7} 7^{9} |
| 3 | (Qatar) (Nepal) | Mossa Al-Harrasi / Rashed Naif; Abhishek Bastola / Aki Zuben Rawat | 6; 4 | 6; 4 |

==== Yemen vs. Nepal ====
Yemen
1
Bahrain Tennis Federation, Isa Town, Bahrain
26 October 2023
Hard

Nepal
2

| | | | 1 | 2 | 3 |
|---|---|---|---|---|---|
| 1 | (Yemen) (Nepal) | Ahmed Mohammed; Ritik Rana | 4; 6 | 1; 6 |
| 2 | (Yemen) (Nepal) | Ghassan Al-Ansi; Abhishek Bastola | 4; 6 | 2; 6 |
| 3 | (Yemen) (Nepal) | Mansoor Ahmed / Ghassan Al-Ansi; Pradip Khadka / Aki Zuben Rawat | 1; 6 | 7^{7} 6^{4} | 6; 4 |

==== Yemen vs. Qatar ====
Yemen
0
Bahrain Tennis Federation, Isa Town, Bahrain
27 October 2023
Hard

Qatar
3

| | | | 1 | 2 | 3 |
|---|---|---|---|---|---|
| 1 | (Yemen) (Qatar) | Ahmed Mohammed; Mashari Naif | 1; 6 | 0; 6 |
| 2 | (Yemen) (Qatar) | Ghassan Al-Ansi; Mubarak Shannan Zayid Al-Harrasi | 4; 6 | 4; 6 |
| 3 | (Yemen) (Qatar) | Mansoor Ahmed / Ghassan Al-Ansi; Issa Al-Harrasi / Mossa Al-Harrasi | 0; 6 | 4; 6 |

=== Pool C ===
==== Mongolia vs. Maldives ====
Mongolia
2
Bahrain Tennis Federation, Isa Town, Bahrain
25 October 2023
Hard

Maldives
1

| | | | 1 | 2 | 3 |
|---|---|---|---|---|---|
| 1 | (Mongolia) (Maldives) | Undrakh Purevdorj; Daoud Shaheeb | 6; 3 | 6; 3 |
| 2 | (Mongolia) (Maldives) | Munkhbaatar Badrakh; Abdulla Faaih Fazeel | 6; 2 | 6; 2 |
| 3 | (Mongolia) (Maldives) | Sonompuntsag Enkhjargal / Undrakh Purevdorj; Abdulla Faaih Fazeel / Daoud Shaheeb | 6^{4} 7^{7} | 1; 6 |

==== Bangladesh vs. Maldives ====
Bangladesh
1
Bahrain Tennis Federation, Isa Town, Bahrain
26 October 2023
Hard

Maldives
2

| | | | 1 | 2 | 3 |
|---|---|---|---|---|---|
| 1 | (Bangladesh) (Maldives) | Zarif Abrar; Daoud Shaheeb | 6; 3 | 6; 3 |
| 2 | (Bangladesh) (Maldives) | Alve Mahadi Hasan; Abdulla Faaih Fazeel | 6; 2 | 3; 6 | 0; 6 |
| 3 | (Bangladesh) (Maldives) | Zarif Abrar / Ranjan Ram; Abdulla Faaih Fazeel / Daoud Shaheeb | 4; 6 | 4; 6 |

==== Bangladesh vs. Mongolia ====
Bangladesh
0
Bahrain Tennis Federation, Isa Town, Bahrain
27 October 2023
Hard

Mongolia
3

| | | | 1 | 2 | 3 |
|---|---|---|---|---|---|
| 1 | (Bangladesh) (Mongolia) | Zarif Abrar; Munkhbaatar Badrakh | 1; 6 | 4; 6 |
| 2 | (Bangladesh) (Mongolia) | Alve Mahadi Hasan; Oyunbat Baatar | 2; 6 | 6; 3 | 4; 6 |
| 3 | (Bangladesh) (Mongolia) | Zarif Abrar / Saiam Md; Sonompuntsag Enkhjargal / Undrakh Purevdorj | 1; 6 | 7; 5 | 2; 6 |

=== Pool D ===
==== Brunei Durassalam vs. Tajikistan ====
Brunei
1
Bahrain Tennis Federation, Isa Town, Bahrain
25 October 2023
Hard

Tajikistan
2

| | | | 1 | 2 | 3 |
|---|---|---|---|---|---|---|
| 1 | (Brunei) (Tajikistan) | Timothy Lim; Somon Amonov | 0; 6 | 2; 6 |
| 2 | (Brunei) (Tajikistan) | Aiman Abdullah; Firuz Mukhidinov | 3; 1 | | | retired |
| 3 | (Brunei) (Tajikistan) | Aiman Abdullah / Chung Peng Lim; Somon Amonov / Mirsulton Zamonov | 6; 1 | 5; 7 | 4; 6 |

==== Laos vs. Macau ====
Laos
3
Bahrain Tennis Federation, Isa Town, Bahrain
25 October 2023
Hard

Macau
0

| | | | 1 | 2 | 3 |
|---|---|---|---|---|---|
| 1 | (Laos) (Macau) | Xaysavath Chansomphou; Cheong Ioi Tou | 6; 1 | 7; 5 |
| 2 | (Laos) (Macau) | Sataporn Simmalavong; Ng Long Hei | 6; 1 | 6; 0 |
| 3 | (Laos) (Macau) | Ananda Khamphoumany / Somphone Songbandith; Cheong Ioi Tou / Fong Chi Hei Austin | 6; 1 | 6; 1 |

==== Brunei Durassalam vs. Macau ====
Brunei
2
Bahrain Tennis Federation, Isa Town, Bahrain
26 October 2023
Hard

Macau
1

| | | | 1 | 2 | 3 |
|---|---|---|---|---|---|
| 1 | (Brunei) (Macau) | Chung Peng Lim; Fong Chi Hei Austin | 1; 6 | 2; 6 |
| 2 | (Brunei) (Macau) | Aiman Abdullah; Ng Long Hei | 6; 1 | 6; 2 |
| 3 | (Brunei) (Macau) | Aiman Abdullah / Timothy Lim; Cheong Ioi Tou / Ng Long Hei | 7^{9} 6^{7} | 6; 3 |

==== Laos vs. Tajikistan ====
Laos
3
Bahrain Tennis Federation, Isa Town, Bahrain
26 October 2023
Hard

Tajikistan
0

| | | | 1 | 2 | 3 |
|---|---|---|---|---|---|
| 1 | (Laos) (Tajikistan) | Somphone Songbandith; Mirsulton Zamonov | 6; 2 | 6; 0 |
| 2 | (Laos) (Tajikistan) | Sataporn Simmalavong; Somon Amonov | 3; 6 | 6; 3 | 6; 2 |
| 3 | (Laos) (Tajikistan) | Xaysavath Chansomphou / Ananda Khamphoumany; Somon Amonov / Abbos Ismoilov | 6; 0 | 6; 1 |

==== Brunei Durassalam vs. Laos ====
Brunei
1
Bahrain Tennis Federation, Isa Town, Bahrain
27 October 2023
Hard

Laos
2

| | | | 1 | 2 | 3 |
|---|---|---|---|---|---|
| 1 | (Brunei) (Laos) | Timothy Lim; Xaysavath Chansomphou | 0; 6 | 0; 6 |
| 2 | (Brunei) (Laos) | Aiman Abdullah; Somphone Songbandith | 6; 1 | 6; 1 |
| 3 | (Brunei) (Laos) | Gavin Yeung Kok Lim / Ak Ahmad Dasugi Pg Hj Sulaiman; Ananda Khamphoumany / Sataporn Simmalavong | 1; 6 | 1; 6 |

==== Tajikistan vs. Macau ====
Tajikistan
1
Bahrain Tennis Federation, Isa Town, Bahrain
27 October 2023
Hard

Macau
2

| | | | 1 | 2 | 3 |
|---|---|---|---|---|---|
| 1 | (Tajikistan) (Macau) | Mirsulton Zamonov; Cheong Ioi Tou | 0; 6 | 0; 6 |
| 2 | (Tajikistan) (Macau) | Somon Amonov; Ng Long Hei | 6; 2 | 6; 1 |
| 3 | (Tajikistan) (Macau) | Somon Amonov / Mirsulton Zamonov; Cheong Ioi Tou / Fong Chi Hei Austin | 4; 6 | 4; 6 |

== Play-offs ==
=== Promotional play-offs ===
==== Myanmar vs. Laos ====
Myanmar
2
Bahrain Tennis Federation, Isa Town, Bahrain
28 October 2023
Hard

Laos
1

| | | | 1 | 2 | 3 |
|---|---|---|---|---|---|
| 1 | (Myanmar) (Laos) | Myu Paing Min; Xaysavath Chansomphou | 6; 3 | 6; 1 |
| 2 | (Myanmar) (Laos) | Hein Latt Kyaw; Sataporn Simmalavong | 4; 6 | 1; 6 |
| 3 | (Myanmar) (Laos) | Myu Paing Min / Aung Myo Thant; Ananda Khamphoumany / Sataporn Simmalavong | 4; 6 | 7; 5 | 6; 3 |

==== Qatar vs. Mongolia ====
Qatar
3
Bahrain Tennis Federation, Isa Town, Bahrain
28 October 2023
Hard

Mongolia
0

| | | | 1 | 2 | 3 |
|---|---|---|---|---|---|
| 1 | (Qatar) (Mongolia) | Mashari Naif; Munkhbaatar Badrakh | 4; 6 | 6; 1 | 6; 2 |
| 2 | (Qatar) (Mongolia) | Mubarak Shannan Zayid Al-Harrasi; Oyunbat Baatar | 6; 2 | 6; 2 |
| 3 | (Qatar) (Mongolia) | Issa Al-Harrasi / Rashed Naif; Sonompuntsag Enkhjargal / Undrakh Purevdorj | 6; 1 | 6; 3 |

=== Fifth place play-off ===
==== Bahrain vs. Brunei Durassalam ====
Bahrain
2
Bahrain Tennis Federation, Isa Town, Bahrain
28 October 2023
Hard

Brunei
1

| | | | 1 | 2 | 3 |
|---|---|---|---|---|---|
| 1 | (Bahrain) (Brunei) | Elyas Abdulnabi; Timothy Lim | 6; 0 | 6; 2 |
| 2 | (Bahrain) (Brunei) | Faris Al-Toobli; Aiman Abdullah | 6; 3 | 0; 6 | 1; 6 |
| 3 | (Bahrain) (Brunei) | Elyas Abdulnabi / Hasan Abdulnabi; Gavin Yeung Kok Lim / Timothy Lim | 6; 0 | 6; 1 |

=== Seventh place play-off ===
==== Nepal vs. Maldives ====
Nepal
3
Bahrain Tennis Federation, Isa Town, Bahrain
28 October 2023
Hard

Maldives
0

| | | | 1 | 2 | 3 |
|---|---|---|---|---|---|
| 1 | (Nepal) (Maldives) | Ritik Rana; Daoud Shaheeb | 6; 4 | 6; 0 |
| 2 | (Nepal) (Maldives) | Abhishek Bastola; Abdulla Faaih Fazeel | 6; 2 | 6^{8} 7^{10} | 6; 2 |
| 3 | (Nepal) (Maldives) | Pradip Khadka / Aki Zuben Rawat; Mohamed Kaisaan Izzath Rasheed / Aiham Shiyam | 6; 1 | 6; 2 |

=== Ninth place play-off ===
==== Bhutan vs. Macau ====
Bhutan
1
Bahrain Tennis Federation, Isa Town, Bahrain
28 October 2023
Hard

Macau
2

| | | | 1 | 2 | 3 |
|---|---|---|---|---|---|
| 1 | (Bhutan) (Macau) | Thinley Norbu; Fong Chi Hei Austin | 6; 4 | 6; 7 | 3; 6 |
| 2 | (Bhutan) (Macau) | Pema Norbu; Cheong Ioi Tou | 1; 6 | 1; 6 |
| 3 | (Bhutan) (Macau) | Tenzin Singye Dorji / Tandin Wangchuk; Cheong Ioi Tou / Ng Long Hei | 6; 3 | 6; 3 |

=== Eleventh place play-off ===
==== Yemen vs. Bangladesh ====
Yemen
3
Bahrain Tennis Federation, Isa Town, Bahrain
28 October 2023
Hard

Bangladesh
0

| | | | 1 | 2 | 3 |
|---|---|---|---|---|---|
| 1 | (Yemen) (Bangladesh) | Ahmed Mohammed; Saiam Md | 6; 0 | 6; 4 |
| 2 | (Yemen) (Bangladesh) | Ghassan Al-Ansi; Zarif Abrar | 6; 3 | 6; 2 |
| 3 | (Yemen) (Bangladesh) | Mansoor Ahmed / Ghassan Al-Ansi; Zarif Abrar / Ranjan Ram | 6; 1 | 6; 4 |

== Final placements ==
| Placing | Teams | |
| Promoted/First | Myanmar | Qatar |
| Third | Laos | Mongolia |
| Fifth | Bahrain | |
| Sixth | Brunei | |
| Seventh | Nepal | |
| Eighth | Maldives | |
| Ninth | Macau | |
| Tenth | Bhutan | |
| Eleventh | Yemen | |
| Twelfth | Bangladesh | |
| Thirteenth | Tajikistan | |

- Myanmar and Qatar were promoted to 2024 Davis Cup Asia/Oceania Zone Group IV.
