= 2020 Dubai Tennis Championships – Men's doubles =

Men's doubles
- 2020 Dubai Tennis Championships

Final
- Champions: (Australia) John Peers (New Zealand) Michael Venus
- Runners-up: (South Africa) Raven Klaasen (Austria) Oliver Marach
- Score: 6–3, 6–2

Details
- Draw: 16
- Seeds: 4

Events
Singles	men	women
Doubles	men	women
- Dubai Tennis Championships

Rajeev Ram and Joe Salisbury were the defending champions, but lost in the quarterfinals to John Peers and Michael Venus.

Peers and Venus went on to win the title, defeating Raven Klaasen and Oliver Marach in the final, 6–3, 6–2.

This tournament marked the final professprofessional appearance of former doubles world No. 1 and eight-time men's doubles major champion Leander Paes.

== Seeds ==
1. (United States) Rajeev Ram / (United Kingdom) Joe Salisbury (quarterfinals)
2. (Croatia) Ivan Dodig / (Slovakia) Filip Polášek (first round)
3. (Germany) Kevin Krawietz / (Germany) Andreas Mies (quarterfinals)
4. (South Africa) Raven Klaasen / (Austria) Oliver Marach (final)

== Draw ==
Key

- Q = Qualifier
- WC = Wild card
- LL = Lucky loser
- Alt = Alternate
- ITF = ITF entry
- PR = Protected ranking
- SR = Special ranking
- SE = Special exempt
- JE = Junior exempt
- JR = Junior Accelerator Programme entrant
- CO = College Accelerator Programme entrant
- NG = Next Gen Accelerator Program entrant
- w/o = Walkover
- r = Retired
- d = Defaulted

=== Draw ===
First round
1	(United States) R Ram (United Kingdom) J Salisbury	6	6
(Croatia) M Čilić (Serbia) N Djokovic	2	2
(Australia) J Peers (New Zealand) M Venus	6	6
(France) P-H Herbert (France) B Paire	4	4
3	(Germany) K Krawietz (Germany) A Mies	6	6^{7}	[10]
(Netherlands) J-J Rojer (Romania) H Tecău	4	7^{9}	[8]
(Austria) J Melzer (France) É Roger-Vasselin	6	7^{7}
(United Kingdom) J Murray (United Kingdom) N Skupski	1	6^{2}
WC	(United Arab Emirates) A Al Janahi (United Arab Emirates) F Al Janahi	0	1
(Netherlands) W Koolhof (Croatia) N Mektić	6	6
(Russia) K Khachanov (Russia) A Rublev	6^{4}	3
4	(South Africa) R Klaasen (Austria) O Marach	7^{7}	6
Q	(Finland) H Kontinen (Germany) J-L Struff	7^{7}	7^{7}
(Croatia) M Pavić (Brazil) B Soares	6^{2}	6^{4}
WC	(Australia) M Ebden (India) L Paes	6	6
2	(Croatia) I Dodig (Slovakia) F Polášek	4	3

Quarterfinals
1	(United States) R Ram (United Kingdom) J Salisbury	4	2
(Australia) J Peers (New Zealand) M Venus	6	6
3	(Germany) K Krawietz (Germany) A Mies	4	6^{1}
(Austria) J Melzer (France) É Roger-Vasselin	6	7^{7}
(Netherlands) W Koolhof (Croatia) N Mektić	5	4
4	(South Africa) R Klaasen (Austria) O Marach	7	6
Q	(Finland) H Kontinen (Germany) J-L Struff	6	6
WC	(Australia) M Ebden (India) L Paes	3	3

Semifinals
(Australia) J Peers (New Zealand) M Venus	7^{7}	6
(Austria) J Melzer (France) É Roger-Vasselin	6^{2}	2
4	(South Africa) R Klaasen (Austria) O Marach	6	6
Q	(Finland) H Kontinen (Germany) J-L Struff	3	2

Final
(Australia) J Peers (New Zealand) M Venus	6	6
4	(South Africa) R Klaasen (Austria) O Marach	3	2

== Qualifying ==
=== Seeds ===
1. (Finland) Henri Kontinen / (Germany) Jan-Lennard Struff (qualified)
2. (India) Rohan Bopanna / (Spain) Pablo Carreño Busta (qualifying competition)

=== Qualifiers ===
1. (Finland) Henri Kontinen / (Germany) Jan-Lennard Struff

=== Qualifying draw ===
First round
1	(Finland) Henri Kontinen (Germany) Jan-Lennard Struff	w/o
(Italy) Thomas Fabbiano (Finland) Emil Ruusuvuori
WC	(Czech Republic) Lukáš Rosol (Serbia) Viktor Troicki	4	5
2	(India) Rohan Bopanna (Spain) Pablo Carreño Busta	6	7

Qualifying competition
1	(Finland) Henri Kontinen (Germany) Jan-Lennard Struff	6	3	[10]
2	(India) Rohan Bopanna (Spain) Pablo Carreño Busta	3	6	[6]
