= 2018 Davis Cup Asia/Oceania Zone Group IV =

International tennis competition

The Asia/Oceania Zone was the unique zone within Group 4 of the regional Davis Cup competition in 2018. The zone's competition was held in round robin format in Muscat, Oman, from 29 January to 3 February 2018. The two winning nations won promotion to Group III, Asia/Oceania Zone in 2019.

== Participating nations ==
- Bahrain
- Bangladesh
- Guam
- Iraq
- Kyrgyzstan
- Mongolia
- Myanmar
- Oman
- Singapore
- Tajikistan
- Turkmenistan
- United Arab Emirates

=== Inactive nations ===
- Brunei
- Yemen

== Draw ==
Date: 29 January–3 February

Location: Sultan Qaboos Sports Complex, Muscat, Oman (hard)

Format: Round-robin basis. Two pools of six teams. The winner of Pool A will play-off against the runner-up in Pool B and the winner of Pool B will play-off against the runner-up in Pool A to determine which two nations will be promoted to Asia/Oceania Zone Group III in 2019.

=== Seeding ===
Pot	Nation	Rank^{1}	Seed
1	United Arab Emirates	103	1
1	Singapore	106	2
2	Oman	109	3
2	Turkmenistan	111	4
3	Myanmar	112	5
3	Mongolia	113	6
4	Iraq	114	7
4	Bahrain	115	8
5	Bangladesh	116	9
5	Tajikistan	117	10
6	Kyrgyzstan	127	11
6	Guam	NR	12

- ^{1}Davis Cup Rankings as of 27 November 2017

=== Round Robin ===
==== Pool A ====
		OMA	UAE	IRQ	MYA	BAN	KGZ	RR; W–L	Set; W–L	Game; W–L	Standings
3	Oman		2–1	3–0	3–0	3–0	3–0	5–0	28–9 (76%)	205–125 (62%)	1
1	United Arab Emirates	1–2		3–0	3–0	2–1	3–0	4–1	25–8 (76%)	181–101 (64%)	2
7	Iraq	0–3	0–3		2–1	1–2	3–0	2–3	17–19 (47%)	170–180 (49%)	3
5	Myanmar	0–3	0–3	1–2		2–1	3–0	2–3	17–19 (47%)	155–166 (48%)	4
9	Bangladesh	0–3	1–2	2–1	1–2		2–1	2–3	13–19 (41%)	127–148 (46%)	5
11	Kyrgyzstan	0–3	0–3	0–3	0–3	1–2		0–5	2–28 (7%)	61–179 (25%)	6

==== Pool B ====
		SGP	GUM	BHR	MGL	TKM	TJK	RR; W–L	Set; W–L	Game; W–L	Standings
2	Singapore		3–0	3–0	3–0	3–0	3–0	5–0	30–1 (97%)	189–72 (72%)	1
12	Guam	0–3		1–2	3–0	3–0	3–0	3–2	21–12 (64%)	176–129 (58%)	2
8	Bahrain	0–3	2–1		1–2	2–1	3–0	3–2	19–14 (58%)	173–135 (56%)	3
6	Mongolia	0–3	0–3	2–1		2–1	3–0	3–2	15–19 (44%)	131–150 (47%)	4
4	Turkmenistan	0–3	0–3	1–2	1–2		3–0	1–4	12–21 (36%)	149–153 (49%)	5
10	Tajikistan	0–3	0–3	0–3	0–3	0–3		0–5	0–30 (0%)	1–180 (0%)	6

Standings are determined by: 1. number of wins; 2. number of matches; 3. in two-team ties, head-to-head records; 4. in three-team ties, (a) percentage of sets won (head-to-head records if two teams remain tied), then (b) percentage of games won (head-to-head records if two teams remain tied), then (c) Davis Cup rankings.

=== Playoffs ===
Placing	A Team	Score	B Team
Promotional	Oman	2–0	Guam
Promotional	United Arab Emirates	1–2	Singapore
5th–6th	Iraq	0–2	Bahrain
7th–8th	Myanmar	1–2	Mongolia
9th–10th	Bangladesh	1–2	Turkmenistan
11th–12th	Kyrgyzstan	3–0	Tajikistan

- Oman and Singapore were promoted to Group III in 2019.

== Round Robin ==
=== Pool A ===
==== United Arab Emirates vs. Kyrgyzstan ====
United Arab Emirates
3
Sultan Qaboos Sports Complex, Muscat, Oman
29 January
Hard

Kyrgyzstan
0

			1	2	3
1	(United Arab Emirates) (Kyrgyzstan)	Abdulrahman Al Janahi; Kirill Kistanov	6; 1	6; 0
2	(United Arab Emirates) (Kyrgyzstan)	Omar Alawadhi; Evgeniy Babak	6; 1	6; 0
3	(United Arab Emirates) (Kyrgyzstan)	Abdulrahman Al Janahi / Fares Al Janahi; Evgeniy Babak / Georgy Kotlyarevsky	6; 2	6; 3

==== Oman vs. Bangladesh ====
Oman
3
Sultan Qaboos Sports Complex, Muscat, Oman
29 January
Hard

Bangladesh
0

			1	2	3
1	(Oman) (Bangladesh)	Mohammed Al Nabhani; Sree-Amol Roy	6; 0	6; 0
2	(Oman) (Bangladesh)	Abdullah Al Barwani; Dipu Lal	6; 0	3; 6	6; 3
3	(Oman) (Bangladesh)	Mohammed Al Nabhani / Younis Al Rawahi; Ranjan Ram / Mohammad Rana	6; 1	6; 3

==== Myanmar vs. Iraq ====
Myanmar
1
Sultan Qaboos Sports Complex, Muscat, Oman
29 January
Hard

Iraq
2

			1	2	3
1	(Myanmar) (Iraq)	Tin Myo Wai; Akram M. Abdalkarem Al-Saady	2; 6	6^{4} 7^{7}
2	(Myanmar) (Iraq)	Aung Myo Thant; Ali Khairi Hashim Al Mayahi	3; 6	7^{7} 6^{5}	7; 5
3	(Myanmar) (Iraq)	Zaw San Oo / Tin Myo Wai; Akram M. Abdalkarem Al-Saady / Adel Mustafa Al-Saedi	3; 6	6; 3	3; 6

==== United Arab Emirates vs. Bangladesh ====
United Arab Emirates
2
Sultan Qaboos Sports Complex, Muscat, Oman
30 January
Hard

Bangladesh
1

			1	2	3
1	(United Arab Emirates) (Bangladesh)	Omar Alawadhi; Mohammad Rana	4; 5			retired
2	(United Arab Emirates) (Bangladesh)	Fahad Janahi; Dipu Lal	6; 2	6; 2
3	(United Arab Emirates) (Bangladesh)	Fares Al Janahi / Fahad Janahi; Ranjan Ram / Sree-Amol Roy	6; 1	6; 4

==== Oman vs. Iraq ====
Oman
3
Sultan Qaboos Sports Complex, Muscat, Oman
30 January
Hard

Iraq
0

			1	2	3
1	(Oman) (Iraq)	Mohammed Al Nabhani; Akram M. Abdalkarem Al-Saady	6; 3	6; 3
2	(Oman) (Iraq)	Abdullah Al Barwani; Ali Khairi Hashim Al Mayahi	6; 4	5; 7	6; 2
3	(Oman) (Iraq)	Abdullah Al Barwani / Mohammed Al Nabhani; Adel Mustafa Al-Saedi / Barakat Zainy	6; 1	6^{5} 7^{7}	7; 5

==== Myanmar vs. Kyrgyzstan ====
Myanmar
3
Sultan Qaboos Sports Complex, Muscat, Oman
30 January
Hard

Kyrgyzstan
0

			1	2	3
1	(Myanmar) (Kyrgyzstan)	Tin Myo Wai; Georgy Kotlyarevsky	6; 0	6; 0
2	(Myanmar) (Kyrgyzstan)	Aung Myo Thant; Evgeniy Babak	7^{10} 6^{8}	6; 0
3	(Myanmar) (Kyrgyzstan)	Aung Kyaw Naing / Tin Myo Wai; Kirill Kistanov / Georgy Kotlyarevsky	6; 2	6; 0

==== United Arab Emirates vs. Myanmar ====
United Arab Emirates
3
Sultan Qaboos Sports Complex, Muscat, Oman
31 January
Hard

Myanmar
0

			1	2	3
1	(United Arab Emirates) (Myanmar)	Abdulrahman Al Janahi; Aung Kyaw Naing	6; 1	6; 2
2	(United Arab Emirates) (Myanmar)	Fahad Janahi; Aung Myo Thant	3; 6	6; 2	6; 3
3	(United Arab Emirates) (Myanmar)	Abdulrahman Al Janahi / Fares Al Janahi; Aung Kyaw Naing / Tin Myo Wai	6; 0	6; 3

==== Oman vs. Kyrgyzstan ====
Oman
3
Sultan Qaboos Sports Complex, Muscat, Oman
31 January
Hard

Kyrgyzstan
0

			1	2	3
1	(Oman) (Kyrgyzstan)	Mohammed Al Nabhani; Kirill Kistanov	6; 1	6; 1
2	(Oman) (Kyrgyzstan)	Abdullah Al Barwani; Evgeniy Babak	6; 2	6; 2
3	(Oman) (Kyrgyzstan)	Mohammed Al Nabhani / Muneer Al Rawahi; Evgeniy Babak / Georgy Kotlyarevsky	6; 4	6; 0

==== Iraq vs. Bangladesh ====
Iraq
1
Sultan Qaboos Sports Complex, Muscat, Oman
31 January
Hard

Bangladesh
2

			1	2	3
1	(Iraq) (Bangladesh)	Barakat Zainy; Sree-Amol Roy	6; 4	3; 6	2; 6
2	(Iraq) (Bangladesh)	Adel Mustafa Al-Saedi; Dipu Lal	6; 2	6; 4
3	(Iraq) (Bangladesh)	Ali Khairi Hashim Al Mayahi / Adel Mustafa Al-Saedi; Ranjan Ram / Sree-Amol Roy	6^{4} 7^{7}	4; 6

==== United Arab Emirates vs. Iraq ====
United Arab Emirates
3
Sultan Qaboos Sports Complex, Muscat, Oman
1 February
Hard

Iraq
0

			1	2	3
1	(United Arab Emirates) (Iraq)	Abdulrahman Al Janahi; Barakat Zainy	6; 3	6; 3
2	(United Arab Emirates) (Iraq)	Fahad Janahi; Adel Mustafa Al-Saedi	6; 2	6; 4
3	(United Arab Emirates) (Iraq)	Abdulrahman Al Janahi / Fares Al Janahi; Adel Mustafa Al-Saedi / Barakat Zainy	6^{4} 7^{7}	6; 1	6; 3

==== Oman vs. Myanmar ====
Oman
3
Sultan Qaboos Sports Complex, Muscat, Oman
1 February
Hard

Myanmar
0

			1	2	3
1	(Oman) (Myanmar)	Mohammed Al Nabhani; Aung Kyaw Naing	5; 7	6; 2	6; 1
2	(Oman) (Myanmar)	Abdullah Al Barwani; Aung Myo Thant	6; 2	4; 6	6; 3
3	(Oman) (Myanmar)	Muneer Al Rawahi / Younis Al Rawahi; Zaw San Oo / Tin Myo Wai	6; 4	4; 6	6; 3

==== Bangladesh vs. Kyrgyzstan ====
Bangladesh
2
Sultan Qaboos Sports Complex, Muscat, Oman
1 February
Hard

Kyrgyzstan
1

			1	2	3
1	(Bangladesh) (Kyrgyzstan)	Sree-Amol Roy; Georgy Kotlyarevsky	6; 0	6; 1
2	(Bangladesh) (Kyrgyzstan)	Dipu Lal; Kirill Kistanov	4; 6	4; 6
3	(Bangladesh) (Kyrgyzstan)	Mohammad Rana / Sree-Amol Roy; Kirill Kistanov / Georgy Kotlyarevsky	7; 5	6; 0

==== United Arab Emirates vs. Oman ====
United Arab Emirates
1
Sultan Qaboos Sports Complex, Muscat, Oman
2 February
Hard

Oman
2

			1	2	3
1	(United Arab Emirates) (Oman)	Abdulrahman Al Janahi; Mohammed Al Nabhani	5; 7	5; 7
2	(United Arab Emirates) (Oman)	Fahad Janahi; Abdullah Al Barwani	6; 1	6; 4
3	(United Arab Emirates) (Oman)	Abdulrahman Al Janahi / Fares Al Janahi; Abdullah Al Barwani / Mohammed Al Nabhani	5; 7	6; 1	3; 6

==== Myanmar vs. Bangladesh ====
Myanmar
2
Sultan Qaboos Sports Complex, Muscat, Oman
2 February
Hard

Bangladesh
1

			1	2	3
1	(Myanmar) (Bangladesh)	Aung Kyaw Naing; Mohammad Rana	6; 0	7; 5
2	(Myanmar) (Bangladesh)	'Tin Myo Wai'; Dipu Lal	7^{7} 6^{4}	6; 2
3	(Myanmar) (Bangladesh)	Zaw San Oo / Aung Myo Thant; Ranjan Ram / Sree-Amol Roy	2; 6	2; 6

==== Iraq vs. Kyrgyzstan ====
Iraq
3
Sultan Qaboos Sports Complex, Muscat, Oman
2 February
Hard

Kyrgyzstan
0

			1	2	3
1	(Iraq) (Kyrgyzstan)	Akram M. Abdalkarem Al-Saady; Kirill Kistanov	6; 1	6; 3
2	(Iraq) (Kyrgyzstan)	Ali Khairi Hashim Al Mayahi; Evgeniy Babak	6; 3	6; 4
3	(Iraq) (Kyrgyzstan)	Akram M. Abdalkarem Al-Saady / Adel Mustafa Al-Saedi; Evgeniy Babak / Georgy Kotlyarevsky	6; 2	7; 5

=== Pool B ===
==== Singapore vs. Guam ====
Singapore
3
Sultan Qaboos Sports Complex, Muscat, Oman
29 January
Hard

Guam
0

			1	2	3
1	(Singapore) (Guam)	Roy Hobbs; Christopher Cajigan	6; 3	4; 6	6; 4
2	(Singapore) (Guam)	Shaheed Alam; Daniel Llarenas	7^{7} 6^{5}	6; 2
3	(Singapore) (Guam)	Jensen Hui / Ng Hao-yuan; Mason Caldwell / Jean Pierre Huynh	6; 3	6; 2

==== Turkmenistan vs. Tajikistan ====
Turkmenistan
3
Sultan Qaboos Sports Complex, Muscat, Oman
29 January
Hard

Tajikistan
0

			1	2	3
1	(Turkmenistan) (Tajikistan)	Atlymyrat Gurbanov; Firuz Mukhidinov	6; 0	6; 0
2	(Turkmenistan) (Tajikistan)	Yuriy Rogusskiy; Firdavs Odinaev	6; 0	6; 0
3	(Turkmenistan) (Tajikistan)	Atlymyrat Gurbanov / Yuriy Rogusskiy; Firuz Mukhidinov / Firdavs Odinaev	6; 0	6; 0

==== Mongolia vs. Bahrain ====
Mongolia
2
Sultan Qaboos Sports Complex, Muscat, Oman
29 January
Hard

Bahrain
1

			1	2	3
1	(Mongolia) (Bahrain)	Munkhbaatar Badrakh; Elyas Abdulnabi	4; 6	7^{10} 6^{8}	2; 0	retired
2	(Mongolia) (Bahrain)	Temuugei Enkhsaikhan; Ali Dawani	2; 6	0; 6
3	(Mongolia) (Bahrain)	Munkhbaatar Badrakh / Baatar Oyunbat; Hasan Abdulnabi / Ali Dawani	3; 6	6; 4	6; 4

==== Singapore vs. Tajikistan ====
Singapore
3
Sultan Qaboos Sports Complex, Muscat, Oman
30 January
Hard

Tajikistan
0

			1	2	3
1	(Singapore) (Tajikistan)	Ng Hao-yuan; Azamat Mukhudinov	6; 0	6; 0
2	(Singapore) (Tajikistan)	Shaheed Alam; Shakhrom Umarov	6; 0	6; 0
3	(Singapore) (Tajikistan)	Roy Hobbs / Jensen Hui; Azamat Mukhudinov / Shakhrom Umarov	6; 0	6; 0

==== Turkmenistan vs. Bahrain ====
Turkmenistan
1
Sultan Qaboos Sports Complex, Muscat, Oman
30 January
Hard

Bahrain
2

			1	2	3
1	(Turkmenistan) (Bahrain)	Atlymyrat Gurbanov; Hasan Abdulnabi	3; 6	6^{5} 7^{7}
2	(Turkmenistan) (Bahrain)	Yuriy Rogusskiy; Ali Dawani	2; 6	5; 7
3	(Turkmenistan) (Bahrain)	Atlymyrat Gurbanov / Yuriy Rogusskiy; Hasan Abdulnabi / Yusuf Qaed	6; 3	5; 7	6; 2

==== Mongolia vs. Guam ====
Mongolia
0
Sultan Qaboos Sports Complex, Muscat, Oman
30 January
Hard

Guam
3

			1	2	3
1	(Mongolia) (Guam)	Baatar Oyunbat; Christopher Cajigan	3; 6	0; 3		retired
2	(Mongolia) (Guam)	Munkhbaatar Badrakh; Daniel Llarenas	7; 5	2; 6	5; 7
3	(Mongolia) (Guam)	Tamir Ankhbayar / Temuugei Enkhsaikhan; Mason Caldwell / Jean Pierre Huynh	3; 6	1; 6

==== Singapore vs. Mongolia ====
Singapore
3
Sultan Qaboos Sports Complex, Muscat, Oman
31 January
Hard

Mongolia
0

			1	2	3
1	(Singapore) (Mongolia)	Roy Hobbs; Baatar Oyunbat	6; 2	6; 1
2	(Singapore) (Mongolia)	Shaheed Alam; Munkhbaatar Badrakh	6; 0	6; 1
3	(Singapore) (Mongolia)	Jensen Hui / Ng Hao-yuan; Tamir Ankhbayar / Temuugei Enkhsaikhan	6; 1	6; 0

==== Turkmenistan vs. Guam ====
Turkmenistan
0
Sultan Qaboos Sports Complex, Muscat, Oman
31 January
Hard

Guam
3

			1	2	3
1	(Turkmenistan) (Guam)	Atlymyrat Gurbanov; Christopher Cajigan	5; 7	5; 7
2	(Turkmenistan) (Guam)	Yuriy Rogusskiy; Daniel Llarenas	6^{6} 7^{8}	4; 6
3	(Turkmenistan) (Guam)	Hadzhymyrat Charyyev / Gurbanberdi Gurbanberdiyev; Mason Caldwell / Jean Pierre Huynh	6^{6} 7^{8}	6; 2	1; 6

==== Bahrain vs. Tajikistan ====
Bahrain
3
Sultan Qaboos Sports Complex, Muscat, Oman
31 January
Hard

Tajikistan
0

			1	2	3
1	(Bahrain) (Tajikistan)	Ali Dawani; Firuz Mukhidinov	6; 0	6; 0
2	(Bahrain) (Tajikistan)	Yusuf Qaed; Firdavs Odinaev	6; 0	6; 0
3	(Bahrain) (Tajikistan)	Hasan Abdulnabi / Ali Dawani; Azamat Mukhudinov / Firdavz Odinaev	6; 0	6; 0

==== Singapore vs. Turkmenistan ====
Singapore
3
Sultan Qaboos Sports Complex, Muscat, Oman
1 February
Hard

Turkmenistan
0

			1	2	3
1	(Singapore) (Turkmenistan)	Roy Hobbs; Atlymyrat Gurbanov	6; 2	6; 2
2	(Singapore) (Turkmenistan)	Shaheed Alam; Yuriy Rogusskiy	6; 0	6; 1
3	(Singapore) (Turkmenistan)	Jensen Hui / Ng Hao-yuan; Atlymyrat Gurbanov / Yuriy Rogusskiy	7^{7} 6^{5}	7; 5

==== Mongolia vs. Tajikistan ====
Mongolia
3
Sultan Qaboos Sports Complex, Muscat, Oman
1 February
Hard

Tajikistan
0

			1	2	3
1	(Mongolia) (Tajikistan)	Tamir Ankhbayar; Shakhrom Umarov	6; 0	6; 0
2	(Mongolia) (Tajikistan)	Temuugei Enkhsaikhan; Firuz Mukhidinov	6; 1	6; 0
3	(Mongolia) (Tajikistan)	Tamir Ankhbayar / Temuugei Enkhsaikhan; Firdavs Odinaev / Shakhrom Umarov	6; 0	6; 0

==== Bahrain vs. Guam ====
Bahrain
2
Sultan Qaboos Sports Complex, Muscat, Oman
1 February
Hard

Guam
1

			1	2	3
1	(Bahrain) (Guam)	Hasan Abdulnabi; Christopher Cajigan	7; 5	6; 4
2	(Bahrain) (Guam)	Ali Dawani; Daniel Llarenas	6; 2	7^{7} 6^{4}
3	(Bahrain) (Guam)	Ali Dawani / Yusuf Qaed; Jean Pierre Huynh / Daniel Llarenas	3; 6	5; 7

==== Singapore vs. Bahrain ====
Singapore
3
Sultan Qaboos Sports Complex, Muscat, Oman
2 February
Hard

Bahrain
0

			1	2	3
1	(Singapore) (Bahrain)	Roy Hobbs; Elyas Abdulnabi	7^{7} 6^{2}	6; 4
2	(Singapore) (Bahrain)	Shaheed Alam; Ali Dawani	6; 3	6; 4
3	(Singapore) (Bahrain)	Shaheed Alam / Roy Hobbs; Hasan Abdulnabi / Ali Dawani	6; 2	7^{9} 6^{7}

==== Turkmenistan vs. Mongolia ====
Turkmenistan
1
Sultan Qaboos Sports Complex, Muscat, Oman
2 February
Hard

Mongolia
2

			1	2	3
1	(Turkmenistan) (Mongolia)	Hadzhymyrat Charyyev; Munkhbaatar Badrakh	4; 6	1; 6
2	(Turkmenistan) (Mongolia)	Yuriy Rogusskiy; Tamir Ankhbayar	6; 4	6; 2
3	(Turkmenistan) (Mongolia)	Atlymyrat Gurbanov / Yuriy Rogusskiy; Munkhbaatar Badrakh / Baatar Oyunbat	3; 6	6; 4	5; 7

==== Tajikistan vs. Guam ====
Tajikistan
0
Sultan Qaboos Sports Complex, Muscat, Oman
2 February
Hard

Guam
3

			1	2	3
1	(Tajikistan) (Guam)	Shakhrom Umarov; Mason Caldwell	0; 6	0; 6
2	(Tajikistan) (Guam)	Firdavs Odinaev; Jean Pierre Huynh	0; 6	0; 6
3	(Tajikistan) (Guam)	Azamat Mukhudinov / Shakhrom Umarov; Mason Caldwell / Jean Pierre Huynh	0; 6	0; 6

== Playoffs ==
=== Promotional Playoffs ===
==== Oman vs. Guam ====
Oman
2
Sultan Qaboos Sports Complex, Muscat, Oman
3 February
Hard

Guam
0

			1	2	3
1	(Oman) (Guam)	Mohammed Al Nabhani; Christopher Cajigan	3; 6	6; 3	7^{7} 6^{4}
2	(Oman) (Guam)	Abdullah Al Barwani; Daniel Llarenas	1; 6	6; 3	7; 5
3	(Oman) (Guam)	Abdullah Al Barwani / Mohammed Al Nabhani; Mason Caldwell / Jean Pierre Huynh				not played

==== Singapore vs. United Arab Emirates ====
Singapore
2
Sultan Qaboos Sports Complex, Muscat, Oman
3 February
Hard

United Arab Emirates
1

			1	2	3
1	(Singapore) (United Arab Emirates)	Roy Hobbs; Abdulrahman Al Janahi	7^{7} 6^{5}	6; 1
2	(Singapore) (United Arab Emirates)	Shaheed Alam; Fahad Janahi	6; 3	5; 7	5; 7
3	(Singapore) (United Arab Emirates)	Roy Hobbs / Jensen Hui; Omar Alawadhi / Fares Al Janahi	6; 2	2; 6	6; 3

=== 5th Place Playoff ===
==== Iraq vs. Bahrain ====
Iraq
0
Sultan Qaboos Sports Complex, Muscat, Oman
3 February
Hard

Bahrain
2

			1	2	3
1	(Iraq) (Bahrain)	Barakat Zainy; Elyas Abdulnabi	3; 6	0; 6
2	(Iraq) (Bahrain)	Akram M. Abdalkarem Al-Saady; Ali Dawani	2; 6	0; 6
3	(Iraq) (Bahrain)	Ali Khairi Hashim Al Mayahi / Adel Mustafa Al-Saedi; Hasan Abdulnabi / Yusuf Qaed				not played

=== 7th Place Playoff ===
==== Myanmar vs. Mongolia ====
Myanmar
1
Sultan Qaboos Sports Complex, Muscat, Oman
3 February
Hard

Mongolia
2

			1	2	3
1	(Myanmar) (Mongolia)	Zaw San Oo; Tamir Ankhbayar	3; 6	0; 6
2	(Myanmar) (Mongolia)	Aung Myo Thant; Temuugei Enkhsaikhan	6; 2	6; 2
3	(Myanmar) (Mongolia)	Aung Kyaw Naing / Tin Myo Wai; Munkhbaatar Badrakh / Baatar Oyunbat	5; 7	3; 6

=== 9th Place Playoff ===
==== Bangladesh vs. Turkmenistan ====
Bangladesh
1
Sultan Qaboos Sports Complex, Muscat, Oman
3 February
Hard

Turkmenistan
2

			1	2	3
1	(Bangladesh) (Turkmenistan)	Mohammed Rana; Gurbanberdi Gurbanberdiyev	4; 6	4; 6
2	(Bangladesh) (Turkmenistan)	Ranjan Ram; Atlymyrat Gurbanov	7; 5	0; 2		retired
3	(Bangladesh) (Turkmenistan)	Dipu Lal / Sree-Amol Roy; Gurbanberdi Gurbanberdiyev / Yuriy Rogusskiy	7^{7} 6^{5}	6; 2

=== 11th Place Playoff ===
==== Kyrgyzstan vs. Tajikistan ====
Kyrgyzstan
3
Sultan Qaboos Sports Complex, Muscat, Oman
3 February
Hard

Tajikistan
0

			1	2	3
1	(Kyrgyzstan) (Tajikistan)	Kirill Kistanov; Shakhrom Umarov	6; 0	6; 0
2	(Kyrgyzstan) (Tajikistan)	Evgeniy Babak; Firdavs Odinaev	6; 0	6; 0
3	(Kyrgyzstan) (Tajikistan)	Evgeniy Babak / Kirill Kistanov; Firdavs Odinaev / Shakhrom Umarov	6; 0	6; 0
