= 2018 Davis Cup World Group play-offs =

The 2018 Davis Cup World Group play-offs were held from 14 to 16 September. They were the main play-offs of the 2018 Davis Cup. The winners of the playoffs advance as seeded to the 2019 Davis Cup qualifying round.

== Teams ==
Bold indicates team had qualified as seeded to the 2019 Davis Cup qualifying round.

From World Group

- Netherlands
- **Japan**
- **Great Britain**
- Australia
- Switzerland
- **Canada**
- **Serbia**
- Hungary

From Americas Group I

- **Argentina**
- Colombia

From Asia/Oceania Group I

- India
- Uzbekistan

From Europe/Africa Group I

- **Czech Republic**
- **Sweden**
- Bosnia and Herzegovina
- **Austria**

== Results summary ==
Date: 14–16 September

The eight losing teams in the World Group first round ties and eight winners of the Zonal Group I final round ties competed in the World Group play-offs for spots in the 2019 qualifying round. The draw took place on April 10 in London.

**Seeded teams**

1. Argentina
2. Great Britain
3. Australia
4. Switzerland
5. Serbia
6. Canada
7. Czech Republic
8. Japan

**Unseeded teams**

- Austria
- Bosnia and Herzegovina
- Colombia
- Hungary
- India
- Netherlands
- Sweden
- Uzbekistan

Home team	Score	Visiting team	Location	Venue	Door	Surface
**Argentina**	4–0	Colombia	San Juan	Estadio Aldo Cantoni	Indoor	Clay
**Great Britain**	3–1	Uzbekistan	Glasgow	Commonwealth Arena	Indoor	Hard
**Austria**	3–1	Australia	Graz	Messe Congress Graz	Outdoor	Clay
Switzerland	2–3	**Sweden**	Biel/Bienne	Swiss Tennis Arena	Indoor	Hard
**Serbia**	4–0	India	Kraljevo	Kraljevo Sports Hall	Indoor	Clay
**Canada**	3–1	Netherlands	Toronto	Coca-Cola Coliseum	Indoor	Hard
Hungary	2–3	**Czech Republic**	Budapest	Kopaszi Dam	Outdoor	Clay
**Japan**	4–0	Bosnia and Herzegovina	Osaka	Utsubo Tennis Center	Outdoor	Hard

== Play-off results ==
=== Argentina vs. Colombia ===
Argentina
4
Estadio Aldo Cantoni, San Juan, Argentina
14–16 September
Clay (i)

Colombia
0

			1	2	3	4	5
1	(Argentina) (Colombia)	**Diego Schwartzman**; Santiago Giraldo	**6**; 3	**6**; 1	6^{3} **7^{7}**	**6**; 1
2	(Argentina) (Colombia)	**Guido Pella**; Daniel Elahi Galán	3; **6**	**6**; 4	4; **6**	**6**; 3	**6**; 2
3	(Argentina) (Colombia)	**Máximo González / Horacio Zeballos**; Alejandro Gómez / Cristian Rodríguez	**6**; 4	**7^{7}** 6^{3}	6^{4} **7^{7}**	4; **6**	**6**; 4
4	(Argentina) (Colombia)	**Horacio Zeballos**; Nicolás Mejía	**7**; 5	**6**; 2
5	(Argentina) (Colombia)	Guido Pella; Santiago Giraldo						**not** **played**

=== Great Britain vs. Uzbekistan ===
Great Britain
3
Commonwealth Arena, Glasgow, United Kingdom
14–16 September
Hard (i)

Uzbekistan
1

			1	2	3	4	5
1	(United Kingdom) (Uzbekistan)	**Dan Evans**; Denis Istomin	**7^{7}** 6^{4}	4; **6**	0; **6**	**6**; 4	**7**; 5
2	(United Kingdom) (Uzbekistan)	Cameron Norrie; **Jurabek Karimov**	**6**; 0	**7**; 5	6^{6} **7^{8}**	2; **6**	2; **6**
3	(United Kingdom) (Uzbekistan)	**Dominic Inglot / Jamie Murray**; Sanjar Fayziev / Denis Istomin	4; **6**	**7^{10}** 6^{8}	**6**; 2	**6**; 3
4	(United Kingdom) (Uzbekistan)	**Cameron Norrie**; Sanjar Fayziev	**6**; 2	**6**; 2	**6**; 0
5	(United Kingdom) (Uzbekistan)	Dan Evans; Jurabek Karimov						**not** **played**

=== Austria vs. Australia ===
Austria
3
Messe Congress Graz, Graz, Austria
14–16 September
Clay

Australia
1

			1	2	3	4	5
1	(Austria) (Australia)	**Dominic Thiem**; Jordan Thompson	**6**; 1	**6**; 3	**6**; 0
2	(Austria) (Australia)	**Dennis Novak**; Alex de Minaur	3; **6**	**6**; 2	**6**; 3	**6**; 2
3	(Austria) (Australia)	Oliver Marach / Jürgen Melzer; **Lleyton Hewitt / John Peers**	1; **6**	4; **6**	**6**; 3	5; **7**
4	(Austria) (Australia)	**Dominic Thiem**; Alex de Minaur	**6**; 4	**6**; 2	3; **6**	**6**; 4
5	(Austria) (Australia)	Dennis Novak; Jordan Thompson						**not** **played**

=== Switzerland vs. Sweden ===
Switzerland
2
Swiss Tennis Arena, Biel/Bienne, Switzerland
14–16 September
Hard (i)

Sweden
3

			1	2	3	4	5
1	(Switzerland) (Sweden)	Marc-Andrea Hüsler; **Markus Eriksson**	**6**; 3	**6**; 4	4; **6**	6^{10} **7^{12}**	4; **6**
2	(Switzerland) (Sweden)	**Henri Laaksonen**; Jonathan Mridha	**7^{7}** 6^{5}	**6**; 2	**6**; 3
3	(Switzerland) (Sweden)	Antoine Bellier / Luca Margaroli; **Markus Eriksson / Robert Lindstedt**	2; **6**	2; **6**	4; **6**
4	(Switzerland) (Sweden)	**Henri Laaksonen**; Markus Eriksson	**6**; 2	**6**; 2	6^{5} **7^{7}**	**6**; 1
5	(Switzerland) (Sweden)	Sandro Ehrat; **Jonathan Mridha**	**6**; 4	3; **6**	4; **6**	6^{4} **7^{7}**

=== Serbia vs. India ===
Serbia
4
Kraljevo Sports Hall, Kraljevo, Serbia
14–16 September
Clay (i)

India
0

			1	2	3	4	5
1	(Serbia) (India)	**Laslo Đere**; Ramkumar Ramanathan	3; **6**	**6**; 4	**7^{7}** 6^{2}	**6**; 2
2	(Serbia) (India)	**Dušan Lajović**; Prajnesh Gunneswaran	**6**; 4	**6**; 3	**6**; 4
3	(Serbia) (India)	**Nikola Milojević / Danilo Petrović**; Rohan Bopanna / Saketh Myneni	**7^{7}** 6^{5}	**6**; 2	**7^{7}** 6^{4}
4	(Serbia) (India)	**Peđa Krstin**; Sriram Balaji	**6**; 3	**6**; 1
5	(Serbia) (India)	Laslo Đere; Prajnesh Gunneswaran						**not** **played**

=== Canada vs. Netherlands ===
Canada
3
Coca-Cola Coliseum, Toronto, Canada
14–16 September
Hard (i)

Netherlands
1

			1	2	3	4	5
1	(Canada) (Netherlands)	**Milos Raonic**; Thiemo de Bakker	**6**; 3	**6**; 2	**6**; 2
2	(Canada) (Netherlands)	**Denis Shapovalov**; Robin Haase	3; **6**	3; **6**	**7**; 5	**6**; 3	**6**; 4
3	(Canada) (Netherlands)	Daniel Nestor / Vasek Pospisil; **Matwé Middelkoop / Jean-Julien Rojer**	**6**; 4	3; **6**	4; **6**	4; **6**
4	(Canada) (Netherlands)	**Milos Raonic**; Scott Griekspoor	**7^{7}** 6^{4}	**6**; 3	**6**; 4
5	(Canada) (Netherlands)	Denis Shapovalov; Thiemo de Bakker						**not** **played**

=== Hungary vs. Czech Republic ===
Hungary
2
Lurdy Ház, Budapest, Hungary
14–16 September
Clay

Czech Republic
3

			1	2	3	4	5
1	(Hungary) (Czech Republic)	**Zsombor Piros**; Jiří Veselý	3; **6**	**6**; 4	4; **6**	**7^{7}** 6^{3}	**7**; 5
2	(Hungary) (Czech Republic)	Máté Valkusz; **Lukáš Rosol**	1; **6**	2; **6**	4; **6**
3	(Hungary) (Czech Republic)	**Gábor Borsos / Péter Nagy**; Roman Jebavý / Lukáš Rosol	3; **6**	4; **6**	**6**; 1	**6**; 2	**6**; 4
4	(Hungary) (Czech Republic)	Máté Valkusz; **Jiří Veselý**	**7^{7}** 6^{4}	3; **6**	2; **6**	4; **6**
5	(Hungary) (Czech Republic)	Zsombor Piros; **Lukáš Rosol**	4; **6**	6^{6} **7^{8}**	3; **6**

=== Japan vs. Bosnia and Herzegovina ===
Japan
4
Utsubo Tennis Center, Osaka, Japan
14–16 September
Hard

Bosnia and Herzegovina
0

			1	2	3	4	5
1	(Japan) (Bosnia and Herzegovina)	**Taro Daniel**; Tomislav Brkić	**6**; 4	**6**; 2	**7^{7}** 6^{3}
2	(Japan) (Bosnia and Herzegovina)	**Yoshihito Nishioka**; Mirza Bašić	**6**; 4	**6**; 3	**6**; 3
3	(Japan) (Bosnia and Herzegovina)	**Ben McLachlan / Yasutaka Uchiyama**; Tomislav Brkić / Nerman Fatić	**6**; 2	**6**; 4	**6**; 4
4	(Japan) (Bosnia and Herzegovina)	**Yosuke Watanuki**; Darko Bojanović	**6**; 1	**6**; 3
5	(Japan) (Bosnia and Herzegovina)	Yoshihito Nishioka; Tomislav Brkić						**not** **played**
