= 2020 Dubai Tennis Championships – Women's doubles =

Women's doubles
- 2020 Dubai Tennis Championships

Final
- Champions: (Chinese Taipei) Hsieh Su-wei (Czech Republic) Barbora Strýcová
- Runners-up: (Czech Republic) Barbora Krejčíková (China) Zheng Saisai
- Score: 7–5, 3–6, [10–5]

Events
Singles	men	women
Doubles	men	women
- Dubai Tennis Championships

Hsieh Su-wei and Barbora Strýcová were the defending champions and successfully defended their title, defeating Barbora Krejčíková and Zheng Saisai in the final, 7–5, 3–6, [10–5].

== Seeds ==
The top four seeds received a bye into the second round.

1. (Chinese Taipei) Hsieh Su-wei / (Czech Republic) Barbora Strýcová (champions)
2. (Chinese Taipei) Chan Hao-ching / (Chinese Taipei) Latisha Chan (second round)
3. (United States) Nicole Melichar / (China) Xu Yifan (quarterfinals)
4. (Canada) Gabriela Dabrowski / (China) Zhang Shuai (semifinals)
5. (Czech Republic) Barbora Krejčíková / (China) Zheng Saisai (final)
6. (Czech Republic) Květa Peschke / (Netherlands) Demi Schuurs (second round)
7. (China) Duan Yingying / (Russia) Veronika Kudermetova (second round)
8. (Japan) Shuko Aoyama / (Japan) Ena Shibahara (first round)

== Draw ==
Key

- Q = Qualifier
- WC = Wild card
- LL = Lucky loser
- Alt = Alternate
- ITF = ITF entry
- PR = Protected ranking
- SR = Special ranking
- SE = Special exempt
- JE = Junior exempt
- JR = Junior Accelerator Programme entrant
- CO = College Accelerator Programme entrant
- NG = Next Gen Accelerator Program entrant
- w/o = Walkover
- r = Retired
- d = Defaulted

=== Finals ===
Semifinals
1	(Chinese Taipei) Hsieh Su-wei (Czech Republic) Barbora Strýcová	7	6
4	(Canada) Gabriela Dabrowski (China) Zhang Shuai	5	3
5	(Czech Republic) Barbora Krejčíková (China) Zheng Saisai	6	6
(United States) Desirae Krawczyk (United States) Alison Riske	2	2

Final
1	(Chinese Taipei) Hsieh Su-wei (Czech Republic) Barbora Strýcová	7	3	[10]
5	(Czech Republic) Barbora Krejčíková (China) Zheng Saisai	5	6	[5]

=== Top half ===
First round
(China) X Han (China) S Peng	4	7	[10]
(Sweden) C Lister (Czech Republic) R Voráčová	6	5	[6]
(United States) S Kenin (United States) B Mattek-Sands	6	7
WC	(Australia) M Adamczak (Russia) Y Sizikova	0	5
(Belgium) K Flipkens (Belgium) A Van Uytvanck	3	1
6	(Czech Republic) K Peschke (Netherlands) D Schuurs	6	6
(Czech Republic) K Muchová (Czech Republic) M Vondroušová	6	4	[10]
(United States) J Brady (Latvia) A Sevastova	3	6	[7]
PR	(Croatia) D Jurak (Kazakhstan) Y Shvedova	6	2	[4]
(Ukraine) L Kichenok (Ukraine) N Kichenok	4	6	[10]
(Switzerland) V Golubic (Switzerland) J Teichmann	0	1
7	(China) Y Duan (Russia) V Kudermetova	6	6

Second round
1	(Chinese Taipei) S-w Hsieh (Czech Republic) B Strýcová	6	6
(China) X Han (China) S Peng	2	2
(United States) S Kenin (United States) B Mattek-Sands	0	6	[10]
6	(Czech Republic) K Peschke (Netherlands) D Schuurs	6	0	[1]
4	(Canada) G Dabrowski (China) S Zhang	w/o
(Czech Republic) K Muchová (Czech Republic) M Vondroušová
(Ukraine) L Kichenok (Ukraine) N Kichenok	6^{3}	7	[10]
7	(China) Y Duan (Russia) V Kudermetova	7^{7}	5	[7]

Quarterfinals
1	(Chinese Taipei) S-w Hsieh (Czech Republic) B Strýcová	6	6
(United States) S Kenin (United States) B Mattek-Sands	3	0
4	(Canada) G Dabrowski (China) S Zhang	6	6
(Ukraine) L Kichenok (Ukraine) N Kichenok	2	4

Semifinals
1	(Chinese Taipei) S-w Hsieh (Czech Republic) B Strýcová	7	6
4	(Canada) G Dabrowski (China) S Zhang	5	3

=== Bottom half ===
First round
5	(Czech Republic) B Krejčíková (China) S Zheng	6	6
(Chile) A Guarachi (Poland) A Rosolska	4	2
WC	(France) C Garcia (India) S Mirza	6	4	[10]
PR	(Russia) A Kudryavtseva (Slovenia) K Srebotnik	4	6	[8]
(Japan) M Ninomiya (China) Z Yang	6	6
(Germany) J Görges (Romania) S Halep	2	1
8	(Japan) S Aoyama (Japan) E Shibahara	2	2
(Czech Republic) Ka Plíšková (Czech Republic) Kr Plíšková	6	6
(United States) H Carter (Brazil) L Stefani	6^{4}	7	[10]
(Czech Republic) L Hradecká (Slovenia) A Klepač	7^{7}	5	[2]
(United States) D Krawczyk (United States) A Riske	6	4	[10]
(United States) K Christian (Georgia (country)) O Kalashnikova	4	6	[8]

Second round
5	(Czech Republic) B Krejčíková (China) S Zheng	6	6
WC	(France) C Garcia (India) S Mirza	4	2
(Japan) M Ninomiya (China) Z Yang	6	5	[7]
3	(United States) N Melichar (China) Y Xu	1	7	[10]
(Czech Republic) Ka Plíšková (Czech Republic) Kr Plíšková	4	4
(United States) H Carter (Brazil) L Stefani	6	6
(United States) D Krawczyk (United States) A Riske	3	6	[10]
2	(Chinese Taipei) H-c Chan (Chinese Taipei) L Chan	6	3	[7]

Quarterfinals
5	(Czech Republic) B Krejčíková (China) S Zheng	6	5	[13]
3	(United States) N Melichar (China) Y Xu	4	7	[11]
(United States) H Carter (Brazil) L Stefani	3	6	[6]
(United States) D Krawczyk (United States) A Riske	6	4	[10]

Semifinals
5	(Czech Republic) B Krejčíková (China) S Zheng	6	6
(United States) D Krawczyk (United States) A Riske	2	2
