= 2020 Dubai Tennis Championships – Men's singles =

Men's singles
- 2020 Dubai Tennis Championships

Final
- Champion: (Serbia) Novak Djokovic
- Runner-up: (Greece) Stefanos Tsitsipas
- Score: 6–3, 6–4

Details
- Draw: 32 (4 Q / 3 WC )
- Seeds: 8

Events
Singles	men	women
Doubles	men	women
- Dubai Tennis Championships

Novak Djokovic won the title, defeating Stefanos Tsitsipas in the final, 6–3, 6–4. Djokovic saved three match points in his semifinal match against Gaël Monfils.

Roger Federer was the defending champion, but withdrew from the tournament after undergoing surgery on his right knee.

== Seeds ==
1. (Serbia) Novak Djokovic (champion)
2. (Greece) Stefanos Tsitsipas (final)
3. (France) Gaël Monfils (semifinals)
4. (Italy) Fabio Fognini (first round)
5. (Spain) Roberto Bautista Agut (first round)
6. (Russia) Andrey Rublev (quarterfinals)
7. (Russia) Karen Khachanov (quarterfinals)
8. (France) Benoît Paire (second round)

== Draw ==
Key

- Q = Qualifier
- WC = Wild card
- LL = Lucky loser
- Alt = Alternate
- ITF = ITF entry
- PR = Protected ranking
- SR = Special ranking
- SE = Special exempt
- JE = Junior exempt
- JR = Junior Accelerator Programme entrant
- CO = College Accelerator Programme entrant
- NG = Next Gen Accelerator Program entrant
- w/o = Walkover
- r = Retired
- d = Defaulted

=== Finals ===
Semifinals
1	(Serbia) Novak Djokovic	2	7^{10}	6
3	(France) Gaël Monfils	6	6^{8}	1
(United Kingdom) Dan Evans	2	3
2	(Greece) Stefanos Tsitsipas	6	6

Final
1	(Serbia) Novak Djokovic	6	6
2	(Greece) Stefanos Tsitsipas	3	4

=== Top half ===
First round
1	(Serbia) N Djokovic	6	6
WC	(Tunisia) M Jaziri	1	2
(Germany) P Kohlschreiber	4	6	6
WC	(Egypt) M Safwat	6	4	0
WC	(India) P Gunneswaran	4	3
Q	(Austria) D Novak	6	6
(Kazakhstan) M Kukushkin	6^{2}	1
7	(Russia) K Khachanov	7^{7}	6
3	(France) G Monfils	6	7
(Hungary) M Fucsovics	4	5
PR	(Chinese Taipei) Y-h Lu	6	1	2
Q	(Japan) Y Uchiyama	3	6	6
Q	(South Africa) L Harris	6^{5}	4
(France) R Gasquet	7^{7}	6
(Croatia) M Čilić	6	5	6^{1}
8	(France) B Paire	2	7	7^{7}

Second round
1	(Serbia) N Djokovic	6	6
(Germany) P Kohlschreiber	3	1
Q	(Austria) D Novak	3	4
7	(Russia) K Khachanov	6	6
3	(France) G Monfils	6	6
Q	(Japan) Y Uchiyama	1	2
(France) R Gasquet	6	6
8	(France) B Paire	4	4

Quarterfinals
1	(Serbia) N Djokovic	6	6
7	(Russia) K Khachanov	2	2
3	(France) G Monfils	6	6
(France) R Gasquet	3	3

Semifinals
1	(Serbia) N Djokovic	2	7^{10}	6
3	(France) G Monfils	6	6^{8}	1

=== Bottom half ===
First round
6	(Russia) A Rublev	6	6
Q	(Italy) L Musetti	4	4
(Portugal) J Sousa	6	3	3
(Serbia) F Krajinović	4	6	6
(Japan) Y Nishioka	5	2
(France) P-H Herbert	7	6
(United Kingdom) D Evans	3	6	7
4	(Italy) F Fognini	6	4	5
5	(Spain) R Bautista Agut	6^{2}	5
(Germany) J-L Struff	7^{7}	7
(Georgia (country)) N Basilashvili	5	7^{7}	6
(Lithuania) R Berankis	7	6^{2}	3
(Poland) H Hurkacz	2	5
(Kazakhstan) A Bublik	6	7
(Spain) P Carreño Busta	6^{1}	1
2	(Greece) S Tsitsipas	7^{7}	6

Second round
6	(Russia) A Rublev	7^{7}	6
(Serbia) F Krajinović	6^{3}	0
(France) P-H Herbert	5	6	6^{7}
(United Kingdom) D Evans	7	3	7^{9}
(Germany) J-L Struff	6	6
(Georgia (country)) N Basilashvili	1	0
(Kazakhstan) A Bublik	6^{1}	4
2	(Greece) S Tsitsipas	7^{7}	6

Quarterfinals
6	(Russia) A Rublev	2	6^{9}
(United Kingdom) D Evans	6	7^{11}
(Germany) J-L Struff	6	4	4
2	(Greece) S Tsitsipas	4	6	6

Semifinals
(United Kingdom) D Evans	2	3
2	(Greece) S Tsitsipas	6	6

== Qualifying ==
=== Seeds ===
1. (Sweden) Mikael Ymer (first round, retired)
2. (Germany) Philipp Kohlschreiber (moved to main draw)
3. (Japan) Yūichi Sugita (qualifying competition)
4. (South Africa) Lloyd Harris (qualified)
5. (Austria) Dennis Novak (qualified)
6. (Japan) Yasutaka Uchiyama (qualified)
7. (Australia) Alexei Popyrin (first round)
8. (Finland) Emil Ruusuvuori (qualifying competition, retired)

=== Qualifiers ===
1. (Italy) Lorenzo Musetti
2. (Austria) Dennis Novak
3. (Japan) Yasutaka Uchiyama
4. (South Africa) Lloyd Harris

=== Qualifying draw ===
==== First qualifier ====
First round
1	(Sweden) Mikael Ymer	4	3^{r}
(Russia) Evgeny Donskoy	6	3
WC	(Italy) Lorenzo Musetti	6	7^{7}
7	(Australia) Alexei Popyrin	3	6^{1}

Qualifying competition
(Russia) Evgeny Donskoy	6^{7}	6^{1}
WC	(Italy) Lorenzo Musetti	7^{9}	7^{7}

==== Second qualifier ====
First round
Alt	(Germany) Yannick Hanfmann	7^{7}	6
WC	(Republic of Ireland) Simon Carr	6^{3}	1
(Slovenia) Blaž Rola	6^{3}	7^{7}	4
5	(Austria) Dennis Novak	7^{7}	6^{3}	6

Qualifying competition
Alt	(Germany) Yannick Hanfmann	3	4
5	(Austria) Dennis Novak	6	6

==== Third qualifier ====
First round
3	(Japan) Yūichi Sugita	6	6
WC	(Greece) Petros Tsitsipas	3	2
(China) Zhang Zhizhen	7	6^{2}	2^{r}
6	(Japan) Yasutaka Uchiyama	5	7^{7}	2

Qualifying competition
3	(Japan) Yūichi Sugita	4	6^{7}
6	(Japan) Yasutaka Uchiyama	6	7^{9}

==== Fourth qualifier ====
First round
4	(South Africa) Lloyd Harris	5	6	6
(Italy) Thomas Fabbiano	7	4	3
(Germany) Peter Gojowczyk	5	0^{r}
8	(Finland) Emil Ruusuvuori	7	0

Qualifying competition
4	(South Africa) Lloyd Harris	1
8	(Finland) Emil Ruusuvuori	0^{r}
