= 2020 Dubai Tennis Championships – Women's singles =

Women's singles
- 2020 Dubai Tennis Championships

Final
- Champion: (Romania) Simona Halep
- Runner-up: (Kazakhstan) Elena Rybakina
- Score: 3–6, 6–3, 7–6^{(7–5)}

Details
- Draw: 30 (6 Q / 4 WC )
- Seeds: 8

Events
Singles	men	women
Doubles	men	women
- Dubai Tennis Championships

Simona Halep defeated Elena Rybakina in the final, 3–6, 6–3, 7–6^{(7–5)} to win the women's singles tennis title at the 2020 Dubai Tennis Championships. It was her 20th WTA Tour singles title. Halep saved a match point en route to the title, against Ons Jabeur in the second round.

Belinda Bencic was the defending champion, but lost in the first round to Anastasia Pavlyuchenkova.

This tournament marked the return of former world No. 1 Kim Clijsters, who lost to Garbiñe Muguruza in the first round. It was Clijsters' first professional match since August 29, 2012.

== Seeds ==
The top two seeds received a bye into the second round.

1. (Romania) Simona Halep (champion)
2. (Czech Republic) Karolína Plíšková (quarterfinals)
3. (Ukraine) Elina Svitolina (first round)
4. (Switzerland) Belinda Bencic (first round)
5. (United States) Sofia Kenin (first round)
6. (Netherlands) Kiki Bertens (withdrew)
7. (Belarus) Aryna Sabalenka (quarterfinals)
8. (Croatia) Petra Martić (semifinals)
9. (Spain) Garbiñe Muguruza (quarterfinals)

== Draw ==
Key

- Q = Qualifier
- WC = Wild card
- LL = Lucky loser
- Alt = Alternate
- ITF = ITF entry
- PR = Protected ranking
- SR = Special ranking
- SE = Special exempt
- JE = Junior exempt
- JR = Junior Accelerator Programme entrant
- CO = College Accelerator Programme entrant
- NG = Next Gen Accelerator Program entrant
- w/o = Walkover
- r = Retired
- d = Defaulted

=== Finals ===
Semifinals
1	(Romania) Simona Halep	6	6
Q	(United States) Jennifer Brady	2	0
8	(Croatia) Petra Martić	6^{5}	6^{2}
SE	(Kazakhstan) Elena Rybakina	7^{7}	7^{7}

Final
1	(Romania) Simona Halep	3	6	7^{7}
SE	(Kazakhstan) Elena Rybakina	6	3	6^{5}

=== Top half ===
First round
(United States) A Riske	6^{3}	6	3
WC	(Tunisia) O Jabeur	7^{7}	1	6
(Belgium) E Mertens	6	6
(China) Q Wang	3	0
(Greece) M Sakkari	2	6	1
7	(Belarus) A Sabalenka	6	4	6
3/WC	(Ukraine) E Svitolina	2	1
Q	(United States) J Brady	6	6
(Czech Republic) M Vondroušová	6	6
(Latvia) A Sevastova	3	2
Q	(Russia) V Kudermetova	5	6	7^{7}
(Ukraine) D Yastremska	7	3	6^{2}
WC	(Belgium) K Clijsters	2	6^{6}
9/WC	(Spain) G Muguruza	6	7^{8}

Second round
1	(Romania) S Halep	1	6	7^{9}
WC	(Tunisia) O Jabeur	6	2	6^{7}
(Belgium) E Mertens	4	3
7	(Belarus) A Sabalenka	6	6
Q	(United States) J Brady	4	6	6
(Czech Republic) M Vondroušová	6	4	1
Q	(Russia) V Kudermetova	5	6	4
9/WC	(Spain) G Muguruza	7	4	6

Quarterfinals
1	(Romania) S Halep	3	6	6
7	(Belarus) A Sabalenka	6	2	2
Q	(United States) J Brady	6^{5}	6	6
9/WC	(Spain) G Muguruza	7^{7}	3	4

Semifinals
1	(Romania) S Halep	6	6
Q	(United States) J Brady	2	0

=== Bottom half ===
First round
8	(Croatia) P Martić	6	6
LL	(Chinese Taipei) S-w Hsieh	4	3
(United States) A Anisimova	6^{3}	6	4
(Czech Republic) B Strýcová	7^{7}	2	6
Q	(Romania) S Cîrstea	1	3
(Estonia) A Kontaveit	6	6
(Russia) A Pavlyuchenkova	1	6	6
4	(Switzerland) B Bencic	6	1	1
5	(United States) S Kenin	7^{7}	3	3
SE	(Kazakhstan) E Rybakina	6^{2}	6	6
(Czech Republic) K Muchová	4	6	0
Q	(Czech Republic) K Siniaková	6	4	6
Q	(France) K Mladenovic	6	6
Q	(Belarus) A Sasnovich	4	3

Second round
8	(Croatia) P Martić	6	6
(Czech Republic) B Strýcová	3	3
(Estonia) A Kontaveit	7^{7}	7
(Russia) A Pavlyuchenkova	6^{5}	5
SE	(Kazakhstan) E Rybakina	6	6
Q	(Czech Republic) K Siniaková	3	3
Q	(France) K Mladenovic	1	2
2	(Czech Republic) Ka Plíšková	6	6

Quarterfinals
8	(Croatia) P Martić	7^{7}	6
(Estonia) A Kontaveit	6^{4}	1
SE	(Kazakhstan) E Rybakina	7^{7}	6
2	(Czech Republic) Ka Plíšková	6^{1}	3

Semifinals
8	(Croatia) P Martić	6^{5}	6^{2}
SE	(Kazakhstan) E Rybakina	7^{7}	7^{7}

== Qualifying ==
=== Seeds ===
1. (Germany) Julia Görges (second round)
2. (China) Zhang Shuai (second round)
3. (China) Zheng Saisai (first round)
4. (France) Kristina Mladenovic (qualified)
5. (Russia) Veronika Kudermetova (qualified)
6. (Chinese Taipei) Hsieh Su-wei (qualifying competition, lucky loser)
7. (Slovenia) Polona Hercog (qualifying competition)
8. (Belgium) Alison Van Uytvanck (qualifying competition)
9. (United States) Jennifer Brady (qualified)
10. (Russia) Anna Blinkova (second round)
11. (Spain) Carla Suárez Navarro (qualifying competition)
12. (Australia) Ajla Tomljanović (first round)

=== Qualifiers ===
1. (Romania) Sorana Cîrstea
2. (Belarus) Aliaksandra Sasnovich
3. (Czech Republic) Kateřina Siniaková
4. (France) Kristina Mladenovic
5. (Russia) Veronika Kudermetova
6. (United States) Jennifer Brady

=== Lucky loser ===
1. (Chinese Taipei) Hsieh Su-wei

=== Qualifying draw ===
==== First qualifier ====
First round
1	(Germany) Julia Görges	6	6
(Italy) Camila Giorgi	2	4
(Russia) Margarita Gasparyan	4	3
(Romania) Sorana Cîrstea	6	6
(Kazakhstan) Anna Danilina	2	6	6
(Russia) Varvara Flink	6	4	4
(Netherlands) Bibiane Schoofs	1	4
11	(Spain) Carla Suárez Navarro	6	6

Second round
1	(Germany) Julia Görges	7	4	6^{4}
(Romania) Sorana Cîrstea	5	6	7^{7}
(Kazakhstan) Anna Danilina	3	1
11	(Spain) Carla Suárez Navarro	6	6

Qualifying competition
(Romania) Sorana Cîrstea	6	1	6
11	(Spain) Carla Suárez Navarro	2	6	4

==== Second qualifier ====
First round
2	(China) Zhang Shuai	6	6
(Japan) Misaki Doi	4	3
(Romania) Ana Bogdan	6	6
(Czech Republic) Barbora Krejčíková	4	4
(Belarus) Aliaksandra Sasnovich	7^{7}	2	6
WC	(Brazil) Luisa Stefani	6^{1}	6	2
(Poland) Magdalena Fręch	4	6	3
10	(Russia) Anna Blinkova	6	2	6

Second round
2	(China) Zhang Shuai	6	4	6^{10}
(Romania) Ana Bogdan	3	6	7^{12}
(Belarus) Aliaksandra Sasnovich	6	6
10	(Russia) Anna Blinkova	1	2

Qualifying competition
(Romania) Ana Bogdan	4	6^{4}
(Belarus) Aliaksandra Sasnovich	6	7^{7}

==== Third qualifier ====
First round
3	(China) Zheng Saisai	6^{8}	4
(Czech Republic) Kateřina Siniaková	7^{10}	6
(Bulgaria) Elitsa Kostova	5	1
(Italy) Giulia Gatto-Monticone	7	6
(Slovakia) Kristína Kučová	3	6	6
(Ukraine) Katarina Zavatska	6	2	3
(Russia) Angelina Gabueva	1	4
8	(Belgium) Alison Van Uytvanck	6	6

Second round
(Czech Republic) Kateřina Siniaková	6	6
(Italy) Giulia Gatto-Monticone	1	4
(Slovakia) Kristína Kučová	4	6^{3}
8	(Belgium) Alison Van Uytvanck	6	7^{7}

Qualifying competition
(Czech Republic) Kateřina Siniaková	5	6	7
8	(Belgium) Alison Van Uytvanck	7	2	5

==== Fourth qualifier ====
First round
4	(France) Kristina Mladenovic	6	6
(Italy) Jasmine Paolini	1	4
(Russia) Natalia Vikhlyantseva	3	2
(Russia) Daria Kasatkina	6	6
(Belgium) Ysaline Bonaventure	6^{2}	6	2
(China) Han Xinyun	7^{7}	2	6
(China) You Xiaodi	3	3
7	(Slovenia) Polona Hercog	6	6

Second round
4	(France) Kristina Mladenovic	6	6
(Russia) Daria Kasatkina	3	3
(China) Han Xinyun	2	4
7	(Slovenia) Polona Hercog	6	6

Qualifying competition
4	(France) Kristina Mladenovic	6	6
7	(Slovenia) Polona Hercog	3	1

==== Fifth qualifier ====
First round
5	(Russia) Veronika Kudermetova	6	6
WC	(United Kingdom) Sarah Beth Grey	2	4
(Czech Republic) Tereza Martincová	7	6
(Switzerland) Jil Teichmann	5	4
(Belgium) Kirsten Flipkens	6	7
(Switzerland) Viktorija Golubic	3	5
(United States) Bethanie Mattek-Sands	6	3	7^{9}
12	(Australia) Ajla Tomljanović	4	6	6^{7}

Second round
5	(Russia) Veronika Kudermetova	5	6	6
(Czech Republic) Tereza Martincová	7	3	4
(Belgium) Kirsten Flipkens	1	1
(United States) Bethanie Mattek-Sands	6	6

Qualifying competition
5	(Russia) Veronika Kudermetova	6	6
(United States) Bethanie Mattek-Sands	4	2

==== Sixth qualifier ====
First round
6	(Chinese Taipei) Hsieh Su-wei	6	6
(France) Chloé Paquet	2	2
WC	(Croatia) Tena Lukas	4	3
(Russia) Liudmila Samsonova	6	6
WC	(United Kingdom) Vera Pursnani	0	0
(Canada) Gabriela Dabrowski	6	6
(Czech Republic) Kristýna Plíšková	3	6^{3}
9	(United States) Jennifer Brady	6	7^{7}

Second round
6	(Chinese Taipei) Hsieh Su-wei	7^{7}	6
(Russia) Liudmila Samsonova	6^{1}	2
(Canada) Gabriela Dabrowski	4	3
9	(United States) Jennifer Brady	6	6

Qualifying competition
6	(Chinese Taipei) Hsieh Su-wei	2	2
9	(United States) Jennifer Brady	6	6
