= 2020 Dubai Tennis Championships =

- Date: 17–22 February (women); 24–29 February (men)
- Edition: 28th (men) / 20th (women)
- Category: ATP Tour 500 (men); WTA Premier (women)
- Draw: 32S / 16D (men); 30S / 28D (women)
- Prize money: $2,950,420 (men) (2020) $2,643,670 (women) (2020)
- Surface: Hard, Outdoor
- Location: Dubai, United Arab Emirates
- Venue: Aviation Club Tennis Centre

Champions

Men's singles
- (Serbia) Novak Djokovic

Women's singles
- (Romania) Simona Halep

Men's doubles
- (Australia) John Peers / (New Zealand) Michael Venus

Women's doubles
- (Chinese Taipei) Hsieh Su-wei / (Czech Republic) Barbora Strýcová
- Dubai Tennis Championships

The 2020 Dubai Tennis Championships (also known as the Dubai Duty Free Tennis Championships for sponsorship reasons) was an ATP Tour 500 event on the 2020 ATP Tour and a Premier tournament on the 2020 WTA Tour. Both events were held at the Aviation Club Tennis Centre in Dubai, United Arab Emirates. The women's tournament took place from February 17 to 22 and the men's tournament from February 24 to 29.

The Women's event was expanded to 30 places in the main draw, and 48 places in qualifying; following the cancellation of the Hungarian Ladies Open, which was scheduled in the same week as the Dubai Tennis Championships.

== Points ==
=== Point distribution ===
Event	W	F	SF	QF	Round of 16	Round of 32	Q	Q3	Q2	Q1
Men's singles	500	300	180	90	45	0	20	—N/a	10	0
Men's doubles	500	300	180	90	0	—N/a	45	—N/a	25	0
Women's singles	470	305	185	100	55	1	25	18	13	1
Women's doubles	470	305	185	100	1	—N/a	—N/a	—N/a	—N/a	—N/a

== ATP singles main-draw entrants ==
=== Seeds ===
Country	Player	Ranking^{1}	Seed
SRB	Novak Djokovic	1	1
GRE	Stefanos Tsitsipas	6	2
FRA	Gaël Monfils	9	3
ITA	Fabio Fognini	11	4
ESP	Roberto Bautista Agut	12	5
RUS	Andrey Rublev	14	6
RUS	Karen Khachanov	17	7
FRA	Benoît Paire	20	8

- Rankings are as of February 17, 2020.

=== Other entrants ===
The following players received wildcards into the singles main draw:

- (India) Prajnesh Gunneswaran
- (Tunisia) Malek Jaziri
- (Egypt) Mohamed Safwat

The following player received entry using a protected ranking into the singles main draw:

- (Chinese Taipei) Lu Yen-hsun

The following players received entry from the qualifying draw:

- (South Africa) Lloyd Harris
- (Italy) Lorenzo Musetti
- (Austria) Dennis Novak
- (Japan) Yasutaka Uchiyama

=== Withdrawals ===
Before the tournament

- (Switzerland) Roger Federer → replaced by (Japan) Yoshihito Nishioka
- (France) Jo-Wilfried Tsonga → replaced by (Lithuania) Ričardas Berankis

== ATP doubles main-draw entrants ==
=== Seeds ===
Country	Player	Country	Player	Rank^{1}	Seed
USA	Rajeev Ram	GBR	Joe Salisbury	11	1
CRO	Ivan Dodig	SVK	Filip Polášek	17	2
GER	Kevin Krawietz	GER	Andreas Mies	25	3
NED	Wesley Koolhof	CRO	Nikola Mektić	38	4

- Rankings are as of February 17, 2020.

=== Other entrants ===
The following pairs received wildcards into the doubles main draw:

- (United Arab Emirates) Abdulrahman Al Janahi / (United Arab Emirates) Fares Al Janahi
- (Australia) Matthew Ebden / (India) Leander Paes

The following pair received entry from the qualifying draw:

- (Finland) Henri Kontinen / (Germany) Jan-Lennard Struff

== WTA singles main-draw entrants ==
=== Seeds ===
Country	Player	Ranking^{1}	Seed
ROU	Simona Halep	2	1
CZE	Karolína Plíšková	3	2
UKR	Elina Svitolina	4	3
SUI	Belinda Bencic	5	4
USA	Sofia Kenin	7	5
~~NED~~	~~Kiki Bertens~~	~~8~~	~~6~~
BLR	Aryna Sabalenka	13	7
CRO	Petra Martić	15	8
ESP	Garbiñe Muguruza	16	9

- Rankings are as of February 10, 2020.

=== Other entrants ===
The following players received wildcards into the singles main draw:

- (Belgium) Kim Clijsters
- (Tunisia) Ons Jabeur
- (Spain) Garbiñe Muguruza
- (Ukraine) Elina Svitolina

The following player received entry as a special exempt:

- (Kazakhstan) Elena Rybakina

The following players received entry from the qualifying draw:

- (United States) Jennifer Brady
- (Romania) Sorana Cîrstea
- (Russia) Veronika Kudermetova
- (France) Kristina Mladenovic
- (Belarus) Aliaksandra Sasnovich
- (Czech Republic) Kateřina Siniaková

The following player received entry as a lucky loser:

- (Chinese Taipei) Hsieh Su-wei

=== Withdrawals ===
Before the tournament

- (Canada) Bianca Andreescu → replaced by (Russia) Anastasia Pavlyuchenkova
- (Australia) Ashleigh Barty → replaced by (China) Wang Qiang
- (Netherlands) Kiki Bertens → replaced by (Chinese Taipei) Hsieh Su-wei
- (United States) Madison Keys → replaced by (Czech Republic) Barbora Strýcová
- (United Kingdom) Johanna Konta → replaced by (Latvia) Anastasija Sevastova

== WTA doubles main-draw entrants ==
=== Seeds ===
Country	Player	Country	Player	Rank^{1}	Seed
TPE	Hsieh Su-wei	CZE	Barbora Strýcová	3	1
TPE	Chan Hao-ching	TPE	Latisha Chan	24	2
USA	Nicole Melichar	CHN	Xu Yifan	27	3
CAN	Gabriela Dabrowski	CHN	Zhang Shuai	29	4
CZE	Barbora Krejčiková	CHN	Zheng Saisai	33	5
CZE	Květa Peschke	NED	Demi Schuurs	35	6
CHN	Duan Yingying	RUS	Veronika Kudermetova	42	7
JPN	Shuko Aoyama	JPN	Ena Shibahara	53	8

- Rankings are as of February 10, 2020.

=== Other entrants ===
The following pairs received a wildcard into the doubles main draw:

- (Australia) Monique Adamczak / (Russia) Yana Sizikova
- (France) Caroline Garcia / (India) Sania Mirza

=== Withdrawals ===
During the tournament

- (Czech Republic) Markéta Vondroušová (right adductor strain)

== Champions ==
=== Men's singles ===
- (Serbia) Novak Djokovic def. (Greece) Stefanos Tsitsipas, 6–3, 6–4

=== Women's singles ===
- (Romania) Simona Halep def. (Kazakhstan) Elena Rybakina, 3–6, 6–3, 7–6^{(7–5)}

=== Men's doubles ===
- (Australia) John Peers / (New Zealand) Michael Venus def. (South Africa) Raven Klaasen / (Austria) Oliver Marach, 6–3, 6–2

=== Women's doubles ===
- (Chinese Taipei) Hsieh Su-wei / (Czech Republic) Barbora Strýcová def. (Czech Republic) Barbora Krejčiková / (China) Zheng Saisai, 7–5, 3–6, [10–5]
