= Alhassan Ishaq =

Nigerian politician

Member of the Kano State House of Assembly
- Constituency: Kura/Garun Mallam State Constituency

Personal details
- Born: Kano State, Nigeria
- Party: New Nigeria People's Party
- Occupation: Politician

Alhassan Ishaq is a Nigerian politician who currently serves as the representative for the Kura/Garun/Mallam state constituency in the Kano State House of Assembly. He was elected under the platform of the New Nigeria Peoples Party (NNPP).
