= Nepal Tennis Association =

Sports governing body in Nepal

- नेपाल टेनिस संघ
- Sport: Tennis
- Abbreviation: NTA
- Founded: 1956; 69 years ago
- Affiliation: International Tennis Federation
- Regional affiliation: Asian Tennis Federation
- Location: National Sports Council, Tripureshwor, Kathmandu
- President: Ms.Jyoti Rana
- Secretary: Manohar Das Mool

Official website
- www.anlta.org.np
- (Nepal)

Nepal Tennis Association (NTA) also known as All Nepal Lawn Tennis Association (ANLTA) is the governing body of tennis in Nepal founded in 1956. It has played a vital role in the development of domestic, national and international tennis in Nepal, producing a number of young talented players.

== International and national affiliations ==
- International Tennis Federation (ITF)
- Asian Tennis Federation
- National Sports Council
- Nepal Olympic Committee

== Venues ==
- All Nepal Lawn Tennis Association Tennis Court, ANFA Complex, Satdobato, Lalitpur
- Mahendra Police Club Lawn Tennis Court, Bhrikutimandap, Kathmandu
- Nagpokhari Open Tennis Court, Kathmandu
- Pokhara Tennis Court, Pokhara
