= Guam Davis Cup team =

Guam
- Nations Ranking: 122
- First year: 2018
- Years played: 2
- Ties played (W–L): 10 (5-5)
- Years in World Group: 0 (0-0)
- Davis Cup titles: 0
- Runners-up: 0
- Most total wins: Daniel Llarenas (9-5)
- Most singles wins: Camden Camacho (2-2); Daniel Llarenas (2-3); Christopher Cajigan (2-6)
- Most doubles wins: Daniel Llarenas (7-2)
- Best doubles team: Mason Caldwell & Jean Pierre Hyunh (3-1)
- Most ties played: Daniel Llarenas (13)
- Most years played: Daniel Llarenas (3)

Guam Davis Cup team is a team that represents the island of Guam in Davis Cup tennis competition and is governed by the Guam National Tennis Federation, the governing body of Guam. Guam first competed in the Davis Cup in 2018 and is currently competing in Group II of the Asia/Oceania Zone.

== History ==
Before competing as an independent team, Guam was a part of the Pacific Oceania team with their first appearance being in 1995 until 2017 with only Daniel Llarenas securing a spot on the team playing between 2011 and 2016. In 2018, they played their first Davis Cup as an independent in Group IV of the Asian zone where the team would finish in second place in their group. The following year, they opened with a 2–1 victory over Mongolia After consecutive 3-0 sweeps to Jordan and Turkmenistan, Guam finished equal ninth with a 2–1 victory over Bahrain.

== Current team (2022) ==
TBD

== Results ==
Tournament	2018	2019
Asia/Oceania Zone Group IV	3rd	9th

== See also ==
- Davis Cup
- Guam Billie Jean King Cup team
