= Maldives Davis Cup team =

National tennis team

Maldives
- First year: 2022
- Years played: 2
- Ties played (W–L): 3 (0-3)
- Best finish: Asia/Oceania Zone group IV; 7th place (2022)
- Most total wins: Aiham Shiyam, Abdulla Faith Fazeel (1-3)
- Most singles wins: Aiham Shiyam, Abdulla Faaih Fazeel (1-2)
- Most ties played: Abdulla Faith Fazeel, Hussain Nasif, Aiham Shiyam (3)
- Most years played: Abdulla Faith Fazeel, Hussain Nasif, Aiham Shiyam, Mohamed Fazeeh (1)

The Maldives Davis Cup team represents Maldives in Davis Cup tennis competition and are governed by the Tennis Association of Maldives. They currently compete in the Asia/Oceania Zone of Group IV.

== History ==
Maldives competed in its first Davis Cup in 2022.The Men's team competed in November 2025 in the Group V Asia/Oceania competition. The team lost in the Finals 0-2 to the Northern Mariana Islands. The top player was Abdullah Faaih Fazeel' The team was coached by Farrokh Etminan.

== Players ==
Player	W-L (Total)	W-L (Singles)	W-L (Doubles)	Ties	Debut	Ref
Abdulla Faith Fazeel	1–3	1–2	0–1	3	2022	
Hussain Nasif	0–3	0–0	0–3	3	2022	
Aiham Shiyam	1–3	1–2	0–1	3	2022	
Mohamed Fazeeh	0–1	0–0	0–1	1	2022	

== Recent performances ==
Here is the list of all match-ups of Maldives participation in the Davis Cup in 2022.

Year	Competition	Date	Surface	Venue	Opponent	Score	Result
2022	Asia/Oceania Zone Group IV, Pool B	8 August	Clay	Sri Lanka Tennis Association Courts (SRI)	Yemen	1–2	Loss
2022	Asia/Oceania Zone Group IV, Pool B	9 August	Clay	Sri Lanka Tennis Association Courts (SRI)	Iraq	0–3	Loss
2022	Asia/Oceania Zone Group IV, Pool B	11 August	Clay	Sri Lanka Tennis Association Courts (SRI)	Brunei	1–2	Loss

== See also ==
- Davis Cup
