= Fares Al-Janahi =

Emirati tennis player

Fares Al Janahi
- Country (sports): United Arab Emirates
- Born: 24 January 1999 (age 27)

Singles
- Career record: 0–1 (at ATP Tour level, Grand Slam level, and in Davis Cup)
- Career titles: 0

Doubles
- Career record: 5–2 (at ATP Tour level, Grand Slam level, and in Davis Cup)
- Career titles: 0
- Last updated on: 17 February 2020.

Fares Al Janahi (born 24 January 1999) is an Emirati tennis player.

Al Janahi made his ATP main draw debut at the 2020 Dubai Tennis Championships after receiving a wildcard for the doubles main draw.

Al Janahi represents the UAE at the Davis Cup, where he has a W/L record of 5–3.
