= Yemen Davis Cup team =

The Yemen Davis Cup team represents Yemen in Davis Cup tennis competitions and is governed by the Yemen Tennis Federation.

== History ==
Yemen competed in its first Davis Cup in 2009 in the Asia/Oceania Zone. The team finished 4th of five teams in its Group IV pool after Iraq withdrew as fifth team. In 2010, the team finished last of five teams in Group IV of the Asia/Oceania Zone. Yemen has not competed again in the Davis Cup since 2010.

== Current team (2022) ==
- Ghassan Alansi (Captain-player)
- Halil Sallam (Junior player)
- Alhassan Ishaq

== See also ==
- Davis Cup
