= 2021 Davis Cup Asia/Oceania Zone Group IV =

Davis Cup competition in 2021

The Asia/Oceania Zone was the unique zone within Group 4 of the regional Davis Cup competition in 2021. The zone's competition was held in round robin format in Isa Town, Bahrain, from 18 to 23 October 2021.

== Participating nations ==
- Bahrain
- Cambodia
- Guam
- Iran
- Iraq
- Kyrgyzstan
- Mongolia
- Oman
- Saudi Arabia
- Turkmenistan
- United Arab Emirates
- Yemen

=== Inactive teams ===
- Bangladesh
- Brunei
- Myanmar
- Singapore
- Tajikistan

== Draw ==
Date: 18–23 October 2021

Location: Bahrain Tennis Federation Courts, Isa Town, Bahrain (hard)

Format: Round-robin basis. Three pools of four teams. The top two nations in each pool will play-off to determine which three nations are promoted to Asia/Oceania Group III in 2022.

=== Seeding ===
Pot	Nation	Rank^{1}	Seed
1	United Arab Emirates	115	1
1	Turkmenistan	116	2
1	Iran	117	3
2	Oman	118	4
2	Saudi Arabia	119	5
2	Cambodia	120	6
3	Guam	121	7
3	Iraq	124	8
3	Kyrgyzstan	125	9
4	Mongolia	129	10
4	Bahrain	130	11
4	Yemen	135	12

- ^{1}Davis Cup Rankings as of 20 September 2021

=== Round Robin ===
==== Pool A ====
		KSA	UAE	BHR	GUM	RR; W–L	Set; W–L	Game; W–L	Standings
5	Saudi Arabia		3–0	3–0	3–0	9–0	18–0 (100%)	108–29 (79%)	1
1	United Arab Emirates	0–3		2–1	3–0	5–4	10–9 (53%)	78–77 (50%)	2
11	Bahrain	0–3	1–2		3–0	4–5	9–12 (43%)	81–99 (45%)	3
7	Guam	0–3	0–3	0–3		0–9	2–18 (10%)	59–121 (33%)	4

==== Pool B ====
		TKM	IRQ	OMA	MGL	RR; W–L	Set; W–L	Game; W–L	Standings
2	Turkmenistan		3–0	3–0	3–0	9–0	18–0 (100%)	111–27 (80%)	1
8	Iraq	0–3		3–0	3–0	6–3	12–6 (67%)	92–55 (63%)	2
4	Oman	0–3	0–3		2–1	2–7	4–14 (22%)	37–92 (29%)	3
10	Mongolia	0–3	0–3	1–2		1–8	2–16 (11%)	33–99 (25%)	4

==== Pool C ====
		IRI	CAM	KGZ	YEM	RR; W–L	Set; W–L	Game; W–L	Standings
3	Iran		3–0	3–0	3–0	9–0	18–2 (90%)	115–43 (73%)	1
6	Cambodia	0–3		2–1	3–0	5–4	11–8 (58%)	85–69 (55%)	2
9	Kyrgyzstan	0–3	1–2		3–0	4–5	9–11 (45%)	80–87 (48%)	3
12	Yemen	0–3	0–3	0–3		0–9	1–18 (5%)	33–114 (22%)	4

Standings are determined by: 1. number of wins; 2. number of matches; 3. in two-team ties, head-to-head records; 4. in three-team ties, (a) percentage of sets won (head-to-head records if two teams remain tied), then (b) percentage of games won (head-to-head records if two teams remain tied), then (c) Davis Cup rankings.

=== Play-offs ===
Placing	Team 1	Score	Team 2
Promotional	Saudi Arabia	2–1	Cambodia
Promotional	Turkmenistan	1–2	United Arab Emirates
Promotional	Iran	3–0	Iraq
7th–12th	Bahrain	3–0	Mongolia
7th–12th	Oman	0–3	Yemen
7th–12th	Kyrgyzstan	2–1	Guam

- Saudi Arabia, United Arab Emirates and Iran are promoted to Asia/Oceania Group III in 2022.

== Round Robin ==
=== Pool A ===
==== United Arab Emirates vs. Guam ====
United Arab Emirates
3
Bahrain Tennis Federation Courts, Isa Town, Bahrain
18 October 2021
Hard

Guam
0

			1	2	3
1	(United Arab Emirates) (Guam)	Omar Al-Awadhi; Camden Camacho	7; 5	6; 2
2	(United Arab Emirates) (Guam)	Abdulrahman Al Janahi; Mason Caldwell	6; 3	6; 1
3	(United Arab Emirates) (Guam)	Omar Al-Awadhi / Hamad Abbas Janahi; Camden Camacho / Derek Okuhama	6; 2	6; 4

==== Saudi Arabia vs. Bahrain ====
Saudi Arabia
3
Bahrain Tennis Federation Courts, Isa Town, Bahrain
18 October 2021
Hard

Bahrain
0

			1	2	3
1	(Saudi Arabia) (Bahrain)	Ammar Alhaqbani; Elyas Abdulnabi	4; 0			retired
2	(Saudi Arabia) (Bahrain)	Saud Alhognani; Yusuf Qaed	6; 4	6; 1
3	(Saudi Arabia) (Bahrain)	Omar Ahmed / Ammar Alhaqbani; Abdulkarim Abdulnabi / Hasan Abdulnabi	6; 3	6; 1

==== Saudi Arabia vs. Guam ====
Saudi Arabia
3
Bahrain Tennis Federation Courts, Isa Town, Bahrain
19 October 2021
Hard

Guam
0

			1	2	3
1	(Saudi Arabia) (Guam)	Ammar Alhaqbani; Camden Camacho	6; 1	6; 1
2	(Saudi Arabia) (Guam)	Saud Alhogbani; Mason Caldwell	6; 2	6; 3
3	(Saudi Arabia) (Guam)	Ammar Alhaqbani / Faisal Al Rebdi; Camden Camacho / Derek Okuhama	6; 3	6; 2

==== United Arab Emirates vs. Bahrain ====
United Arab Emirates
2
Bahrain Tennis Federation Courts, Isa Town, Bahrain
20 October 2021
Hard

Bahrain
1

			1	2	3
1	(United Arab Emirates) (Bahrain)	Hamad Abbas Janahi; Elyas Abdulnabi	6; 3	4; 6	6; 2
2	(United Arab Emirates) (Bahrain)	Omar Al-Awadhi; Yusuf Qaed	6; 0	6; 0
3	(United Arab Emirates) (Bahrain)	Mahmoud Nader Al-Baloushi / Abdulrahman Al Janahi; Abdulkarim Abdulnabi / Hasan Abdulnabi	5; 7	0; 2		retired

==== United Arab Emirates vs. Saudi Arabia ====
United Arab Emirates
0
Bahrain Tennis Federation Courts, Isa Town, Bahrain
21 October 2021
Hard

Saudi Arabia
3

			1	2	3
1	(United Arab Emirates) (Saudi Arabia)	Omar Al-Awadhi; Ammar Alhaqbani	2; 3			retired
2	(United Arab Emirates) (Saudi Arabia)	Abdulrahman Al Janahi; Saud Alhogbani	0; 6	1; 6
3	(United Arab Emirates) (Saudi Arabia)	Abdulrahman Al Janahi / Hamad Abbas Janahi; Omar Ahmed / Ammar Alhaqbani	3; 6	2; 6

==== Guam vs. Bahrain ====
Guam
0
Bahrain Tennis Federation Courts, Isa Town, Bahrain
22 October 2021
Hard

Bahrain
3

			1	2	3
1	(Guam) (Bahrain)	Camden Camacho; Abdulkarim Abdulnabi	2; 6	7^{10} 6^{8}	1; 6
2	(Guam) (Bahrain)	Mason Caldwell; Elyas Abdulnabi	6^{1} 7^{7}	0; 6
3	(Guam) (Bahrain)	Mason Caldwell / Derek Okuhama; Hasan Abdulnabi / Yusuf Qaed	5; 7	6; 4	3; 6

=== Pool B ===
==== Turkmenistan vs. Iraq ====
Turkmenistan
3
Bahrain Tennis Federation Courts, Isa Town, Bahrain
18 October 2021
Hard

Iraq
0

			1	2	3
1	(Turkmenistan) (Iraq)	Yuriy Rogusskiy; Adel Mustafa Al-Saedi	7; 5	6; 2
2	(Turkmenistan) (Iraq)	Isa Mammetgulyyev; Mohammed Abuzed Saber	7; 5	6; 2
3	(Turkmenistan) (Iraq)	Isa Mammetgulyyev / Yuriy Rogusskiy; Mohammed Al-Shammari / Abdullah Ali Hatem	7; 5	6; 1

==== Oman vs. Mongolia ====
Oman
2
Bahrain Tennis Federation Courts, Isa Town, Bahrain
18 October 2021
Hard

Mongolia
1

			1	2	3
1	(Oman) (Mongolia)	Isa Ali Alsuleimani; Khatansuikh Batbayar	6; 1	6; 2
2	(Oman) (Mongolia)	Ali Al Busaidi; Oyunbold Baatar	6; 3	6; 2
3	(Oman) (Mongolia)	Marwan Alkhanjari / Isa Ali Alsuleimani; Oyunbold Baatar / Khatansuikh Batbayar	0; 6	3; 6

==== Oman vs. Iraq ====
Oman
0
Bahrain Tennis Federation Courts, Isa Town, Bahrain
19 October 2021
Hard

Iraq
3

			1	2	3
1	(Oman) (Iraq)	Isa Ali Alsuleimani; Adel Mustafa Al-Saedi	2; 6	3; 6
2	(Oman) (Iraq)	Ali Al Busaidi; Mohammed Abuzed Saber	0; 6	0; 6
3	(Oman) (Iraq)	Marwan Alkhanjari / Isa Ali Alsuleimani; Mohammed Al-Shammari / Abdullah Ali Hatem	2; 6	0; 6

==== Turkmenistan vs. Mongolia ====
Turkmenistan
3
Bahrain Tennis Federation Courts, Isa Town, Bahrain
20 October 2021
Hard

Mongolia
0

			1	2	3
1	(Turkmenistan) (Mongolia)	Yuriy Rogusskiy; Khatansuikh Batbayar	6; 1	6; 1
2	(Turkmenistan) (Mongolia)	Isa Mammetgulyyev; Sukhbaatar Puntsag	6; 0	6; 0
3	(Turkmenistan) (Mongolia)	Isa Mammetgulyyev / Yuriy Rogusskiy; Oyunbold Baatar / Khatansuikh Batbayar	6; 0	6; 2

==== Turkmenistan vs. Oman ====
Turkmenistan
3
Bahrain Tennis Federation Courts, Isa Town, Bahrain
21 October 2021
Hard

Oman
0

			1	2	3
1	(Turkmenistan) (Oman)	Yuriy Rogusskiy; Marwan Alkhanjari	6; 0	6; 2
2	(Turkmenistan) (Oman)	Isa Mammetgulyyev; Isa Ali Alsuleimani	6; 0	6; 0
3	(Turkmenistan) (Oman)	Isa Mammetgulyyev / Yuriy Rogusskiy; Ali Al Busaidi / Isa Ali Alsuleimani	6; 0	6; 1

==== Iraq vs. Mongolia ====
Iraq
3
Bahrain Tennis Federation Courts, Isa Town, Bahrain
22 October 2021
Hard

Mongolia
0

			1	2	3
1	(Iraq) (Mongolia)	Adel Mustafa Al-Saedi; Khatansuikh Batbayar	6; 0	6; 0
2	(Iraq) (Mongolia)	Mohammed Abuzed Saber; Sukhbaatar Puntsag	6; 2	6; 2
3	(Iraq) (Mongolia)	Mohammed Al-Shammari / Abdullah Ali Hatem; Oyunbold Baatar / Khatansuikh Batbayar	6; 3	6; 2

=== Pool C ===
==== Iran vs. Kyrgyzstan ====
Iran
3
Bahrain Tennis Federation Courts, Isa Town, Bahrain
18 October 2021
Hard

Kyrgyzstan
0

			1	2	3
1	(Iran) (Kyrgyzstan)	Sina Moghimi; Mirgiiaz Mirdzhaliev	6; 4	7; 5
2	(Iran) (Kyrgyzstan)	Hamidreza Nadaf; Kirill Kistanov	6; 2	6; 0
3	(Iran) (Kyrgyzstan)	Amir Hossein Badi / Hamidreza Nadaf; Namazbek Diushembiev / Mirgiiaz Mirdzhaliev	6; 0	2; 6	6; 0

==== Cambodia vs. Yemen ====
Cambodia
3
Bahrain Tennis Federation Courts, Isa Town, Bahrain
18 October 2021
Hard

Yemen
0

			1	2	3
1	(Cambodia) (Yemen)	Long Samneang; Nawras Hussein	6; 2	6; 4
2	(Cambodia) (Yemen)	Bun Kenny; Halil Sallam	6; 0	6; 1
3	(Cambodia) (Yemen)	Khleang Ponlok / Tep Timothy; Nawras Hussein / Halil Sallam	6; 1	6; 0

==== Cambodia vs. Kyrgyzstan ====
Cambodia
2
Bahrain Tennis Federation Courts, Isa Town, Bahrain
19 October 2021
Hard

Kyrgyzstan
1

			1	2	3
1	(Cambodia) (Kyrgyzstan)	Bun Kenny; Namazbek Diushembiev	6; 0	6; 1
2	(Cambodia) (Kyrgyzstan)	Tep Timothy; Mirgiiaz Mirdzhaliev	2; 6	0; 6
3	(Cambodia) (Kyrgyzstan)	Bun Kenny / Long Samneang; Kirill Kistanov / Mirgiiaz Mirdzhaliev	6; 2	7^{12} 6^{10}

==== Iran vs. Yemen ====
Iran
3
Bahrain Tennis Federation Courts, Isa Town, Bahrain
20 October 2021
Hard

Yemen
0

			1	2	3
1	(Iran) (Yemen)	Ali Yazdani; Nawras Hussein	6; 0	6; 1
2	(Iran) (Yemen)	Amir Hossein Badi; Halil Sallam	6; 2	6; 1
3	(Iran) (Yemen)	Amir Hossein Badi / Ali Yazdani; Nawras Hussein / Halil Sallam	6; 1	6; 0

==== Iran vs. Cambodia ====
Iran
3
Bahrain Tennis Federation Courts, Isa Town, Bahrain
21 October 2021
Hard

Cambodia
0

			1	2	3
1	(Iran) (Cambodia)	Sina Moghimi; Long Samneang	6; 4	6; 2
2	(Iran) (Cambodia)	Hamidreza Nadaf; Bun Kenny	4; 6	6; 1	6; 3
3	(Iran) (Cambodia)	Amir Hossein Badi / Ali Yazdani; Khleang Ponlok / Tep Timothy	6; 2	6; 4

==== Kyrgyzstan vs. Yemen ====
Kyrgyzstan
3
Bahrain Tennis Federation Courts, Isa Town, Bahrain
22 October 2021
Hard

Yemen
0

			1	2	3
1	(Kyrgyzstan) (Yemen)	Mirgiiaz Mirdzhaliev; Nawras Hussein	7^{7} 6^{5}	5; 7	6; 4
2	(Kyrgyzstan) (Yemen)	Kirill Kistanov; Halil Sallam	6; 1	6; 1
3	(Kyrgyzstan) (Yemen)	Namazbek Diushembiev / Mirgiiaz Mirdzhaliev; Nawras Hussein / Halil Sallam	6; 1	6; 1

== Play-offs ==
=== Promotional play-offs ===
==== Saudi Arabia vs. Cambodia ====
Saudi Arabia
2
Bahrain Tennis Federation Courts, Isa Town, Bahrain
23 October 2021
Hard

Cambodia
1

			1	2	3
1	(Saudi Arabia) (Cambodia)	Ammar Alhaqbani; Long Samneang	6; 1	7; 5
2	(Saudi Arabia) (Cambodia)	Saud Alhogbani; Bun Kenny	4; 6	0; 4		retired
3	(Saudi Arabia) (Cambodia)	Ammar Alhaqbani / Faisal Al Rebdi; Bun Kenny / Long Samneang	6; 0	6; 4

==== Turkmenistan vs. United Arab Emirates ====
Turkmenistan
1
Bahrain Tennis Federation Courts, Isa Town, Bahrain
23 October 2021
Hard

United Arab Emirates
2

			1	2	3
1	(Turkmenistan) (United Arab Emirates)	Yuriy Rogusskiy; Hamad Abbas Janahi	2; 6	6; 4	2; 6
2	(Turkmenistan) (United Arab Emirates)	Isa Mammetgulyyev; Omar Al-Awadhi	6; 2	6; 0
3	(Turkmenistan) (United Arab Emirates)	Isa Mammetgulyyev / Yuriy Rogusskiy; Abdulrahman Al Janahi / Hamad Abbas Janahi	6^{6} 7^{8}	3; 6

==== Iran vs. Iraq ====
Iran
3
Bahrain Tennis Federation Courts, Isa Town, Bahrain
23 October 2021
Hard

Iraq
0

			1	2	3
1	(Iran) (Iraq)	Sina Moghimi; Adel Mustafa Al-Saedi	6; 0	4; 6	6; 1
2	(Iran) (Iraq)	Hamidreza Nadaf; Mohammed Abuzed Saber	6; 1	6; 1
3	(Iran) (Iraq)	Sina Moghimi / Hamidreza Nadaf; Mohammed Al-Shammari / Abdullah Ali Hatem	7; 5	6; 3

=== 7th to 12th play-offs ===
==== Bahrain vs. Mongolia ====
Bahrain
3
Bahrain Tennis Federation Courts, Isa Town, Bahrain
23 October 2021
Hard

Mongolia
0

			1	2	3
1	(Bahrain) (Mongolia)	Hasan Abdulnabi; Sukhbaatar Puntsag	6; 0	6; 1
2	(Bahrain) (Mongolia)	Yusuf Qaed; Oyunbold Baatar	6; 0	6; 0
3	(Bahrain) (Mongolia)	Hasan Abdulnabi / Yusuf Qaed; Khatansuikh Batbayar / Sukhbaatar Puntsag	6; 0	6; 1

==== Oman vs. Yemen ====
Oman
0
Bahrain Tennis Federation Courts, Isa Town, Bahrain
23 October 2021
Hard

Yemen
3

			1	2	3
1	(Oman) (Yemen)	Marwan Alkhanjari; Nawras Hussein	2; 6	2; 6
2	(Oman) (Yemen)	Isa Ali Alsuleimani; Halil Sallam	6; 2	3; 6	0; 6
3	(Oman) (Yemen)	Ali Al Busaidi / Marwan Alkhanjari; Nawras Hussein / Halil Sallam	6^{3} 7^{7}	3; 6

==== Kyrgyzstan vs. Guam ====
Kyrgyzstan
2
Bahrain Tennis Federation Courts, Isa Town, Bahrain
23 October 2021
Hard

Guam
1

			1	2	3
1	(Kyrgyzstan) (Guam)	Namazbek Diushembiev; Derek Okuhama	0; 6	6^{6} 7^{8}
2	(Kyrgyzstan) (Guam)	Kirill Kistanov; Camden Camacho	7^{7} 6^{2}	6; 2
3	(Kyrgyzstan) (Guam)	Namazbek Diushembiev / Mirgiiaz Mirdzhaliev; Mason Caldwell / Camden Camacho	6; 0	6; 3
