= 2019 Davis Cup Asia/Oceania Zone Group IV =

The Asia/Oceania Zone was the unique zone within Group 4 of the regional Davis Cup competition in 2019. The zone's competition was held in round robin format in Amman, Jordan from 11 to 14 September 2019.

== Participating nations ==
- Bahrain
- Bangladesh
- Cambodia
- Guam
- Iraq
- Jordan
- Kyrgyzstan
- Mongolia
- Oman
- Pacific Oceania
- Saudi Arabia
- Tajikistan
- Turkmenistan
- United Arab Emirates

=== Inactive nations ===
- Brunei
- Myanmar
- Yemen

== Draw ==
Date: 11–14 September

Location: Jordan Tennis Federation, Amman, Jordan (hard)

Format: Round-robin basis.

=== Seeding ===
Pot	Nation	Rank^{1}	Seed
1	Pacific Oceania	101	1
1	Oman	102	2
1	Jordan	103	3
1	United Arab Emirates	104	4
2	Cambodia	106	5
2	Mongolia	107	6
2	Bahrain	110	7
2	Saudi Arabia	112	8
3	Turkmenistan	116	9
3	Iraq	117	10
3	Bangladesh	120	11
3	Guam	122	12
3	Tajikistan	123	13
3	Kyrgyzstan	127	14

- ^{1}Davis Cup Rankings as of 4 February 2019

=== Round Robin ===
==== Pool A ====
		POC	KSA	BAN	RR; W–L	Set; W–L	Game; W–L	Standings
1	Pacific Oceania		2–1	3–0	2–0	10–2 (83%)	64–24 (73%)	1
8	Saudi Arabia	1–2		3–0	1–1	8–4 (67%)	59–37 (61%)	2
11	Bangladesh	0–3	0–3		0–2	0–12 (0%)	10–72 (12%)	3

==== Pool B ====
		OMA	IRQ	BRN	RR; W–L	Set; W–L	Game; W–L	Standings
2	Oman		2–1	2–1	2–0	10–6 (63%)	87–67 (56%)	1
10	Iraq	1–2		2–1	1–1	7–9 (44%)	81–85 (49%)	2
7	Bahrain	1–2	1–2		0–2	7–9 (44%)	69–85 (45%)	3

==== Pool C ====
		JOR	TKM	GUM	MGL	RR; W–L	Set; W–L	Game; W–L	Standings
3	Jordan		2–1	3–0	3–0	3–0	16–2 (89%)	105–42 (71%)	1
9	Turkmenistan	1–2		3–0	3–0	2–1	14–4 (78%)	102–56 (65%)	2
12	Guam	0–3	0–3		2–1	1–2	4–14 (22%)	50–103 (33%)	3
6	Mongolia	0–3	0–3	1–2		0–3	2–16 (11%)	48–104 (32%)	4

==== Pool D ====
		UAE	CAM	KGZ	TJK	RR; W–L	Set; W–L	Game; W–L	Standings
4	United Arab Emirates		3–0	3–0	3–0	3–0	18–1 (95%)	115–49 (70%)	1
5	Cambodia	0–3		3–0	3–0	2–1	13–6 (68%)	97–57 (63%)	2
14	Kyrgyzstan	0–3	0–3		2–1	1–2	5–15 (25%)	61–108 (36%)	3
13	Tajikistan	0–3	0–3	1–2		0–3	3–17 (15%)	57–116 (33%)	4

Standings are determined by: 1. number of wins; 2. number of matches; 3. in two-team ties, head-to-head records; 4. in three-team ties, (a) percentage of sets won (head-to-head records if two teams remain tied), then (b) percentage of games won (head-to-head records if two teams remain tied), then (c) Davis Cup rankings.

=== Playoffs ===
Placing	A Team	Score	D Team
1st–4th	Pacific Oceania	2–0	United Arab Emirates
5th–8th	Saudi Arabia	2–1	Cambodia
9th–12th	Bangladesh	2–0	Kyrgyzstan
13th	—		Tajikistan

Placing	B Team	Score	C Team
1st–4th	Oman	0–2	Jordan
5th–8th	Iraq	0–2	Turkmenistan
9th–12th	Bahrain	1–2	Guam
13th	—		Mongolia

== Round Robin ==
=== Pool A ===
==== Pacific Oceania vs. Bangladesh ====
Pacific Oceania
3
Jordan Tennis Federation, Amman, Jordan
11 September
Hard

Bangladesh
0

			1	2	3
1	(Pacific Oceania) (Bangladesh)	Matthew Stubbings; Mohammed-Alamgir Hossain	6; 0	6; 1
2	(Pacific Oceania) (Bangladesh)	Colin Sinclair; Dipu Lal	6; 0	6; 0
3	(Pacific Oceania) (Bangladesh)	Brett Baudinet / Colin Sinclair; Mohammed-Alamgir Hossain / Dipu Lal	6; 0	6; 0

==== Saudi Arabia vs. Bangladesh ====
Saudi Arabia
3
Jordan Tennis Federation, Amman, Jordan
12 September
Hard

Bangladesh
0

			1	2	3
1	(Saudi Arabia) (Bangladesh)	Ammar Alhaqbani; Shibu Lal	6; 1	6; 1
2	(Saudi Arabia) (Bangladesh)	Saud Alhaqbani; Dipu Lal	6; 1	6; 0
3	(Saudi Arabia) (Bangladesh)	Ammar Alhaqbani / Abdulmajeed Bukhari; Mohammed-Alamgir Hossain / Sree-Amol Roy	6; 4	6; 2

==== Pacific Oceania vs. Saudi Arabia ====
Pacific Oceania
2
Jordan Tennis Federation, Amman, Jordan
13 September
Hard

Saudi Arabia
1

			1	2	3
1	(Pacific Oceania) (Saudi Arabia)	Matthew Stubbings; Ammar Alhaqbani	1; 6	2; 6
2	(Pacific Oceania) (Saudi Arabia)	Colin Sinclair; Saud Alhaqbani	6; 1	6; 1
3	(Pacific Oceania) (Saudi Arabia)	Brett Baudinet / Colin Sinclair; Ammar Alhaqbani / Saud Alhaqbani	6; 3	7^{9} 6^{7}

=== Pool B ===
==== Oman vs. Iraq ====
Oman
2
Jordan Tennis Federation, Amman, Jordan
11 September
Hard

Iraq
1

			1	2	3
1	(Oman) (Iraq)	Mohammed Al Nabhani; Ali Bahadli	7^{9} 6^{7}	6; 3
2	(Oman) (Iraq)	Abdullah Al Barwani; Akram M. Abdalkarem Al-Saadi	2; 6	6; 3	3; 6
3	(Oman) (Iraq)	Abdullah Al Barwani / Mohammed Al Nabhani; Akram M. Abdalkarem Al-Saadi / Adil Mustafa Al-Saedi	6^{1} 7^{7}	7; 5	6; 4

==== Bahrain vs. Iraq ====
Bahrain
1
Jordan Tennis Federation, Amman, Jordan
12 September
Hard

Iraq
2

			1	2	3
1	(Bahrain) (Iraq)	Elyas Abdulnabi; Ali Suwaed	6; 4	6; 2
2	(Bahrain) (Iraq)	Hasan Abdulnabi; Akram M. Abdalkarem Al-Saadi	3; 6	6; 4	5; 7
3	(Bahrain) (Iraq)	Hasan Abdulnabi / Kareem Abdulnabi; Akram M. Abdalkarem Al-Saadi / Ali Bahadli	3; 6	7; 5	6^{4} 7^{7}

==== Oman vs. Bahrain ====
Oman
2
Jordan Tennis Federation, Amman, Jordan
13 September
Hard

Bahrain
1

			1	2	3
1	(Oman) (Bahrain)	Mohammed Al Nabhani; Elyas Abdulnabi	4; 6	6; 4	6; 1
2	(Oman) (Bahrain)	Abdullah Al Barwani; Hasan Abdulnabi	6; 2	6^{4} 7^{7}	4; 6
3	(Oman) (Bahrain)	Abdullah Al Barwani / Mohammed Al Nabhani; Elyas Abdulnabi / Hasan Abdulnabi	6; 0	6; 1

=== Pool C ===
==== Jordan vs. Turkmenistan ====
Jordan
2
Jordan Tennis Federation, Amman, Jordan
11 September
Hard

Turkmenistan
1

			1	2	3
1	(Jordan) (Turkmenistan)	Abedallah Shelbayh; Arslan Orashev	6; 2	6; 4
2	(Jordan) (Turkmenistan)	Mousa Alkotop; Isa Mämmetgulyýew	6^{4} 7^{7}	2; 6
3	(Jordan) (Turkmenistan)	Mousa Alkotop / Abedallah Shelbayh; Isa Mämmetgulyýew / Yuriy Rogusskiy	7^{7} 6^{4}	6; 3

==== Mongolia vs. Guam ====
Mongolia
1
Jordan Tennis Federation, Amman, Jordan
11 September
Hard

Guam
2

			1	2	3
1	(Mongolia) (Guam)	Tamir Ankhbayar; Camden Camacho	4; 6	6^{4} 7^{7}
2	(Mongolia) (Guam)	Duurenbayar Erdenebayar; Christopher Cajigan	6; 2	6; 3
3	(Mongolia) (Guam)	Duurenbayar Erdenebayar / Sukhjargal Sukhbaatar; Camden Camacho / Derek Okuhama	5; 7	3; 6

==== Jordan vs. Mongolia ====
Jordan
3
Jordan Tennis Federation, Amman, Jordan
12 September
Hard

Mongolia
0

			1	2	3
1	(Jordan) (Mongolia)	Seif Adas; Sukhjargal Sukhbaatar	6; 3	6; 0
2	(Jordan) (Mongolia)	Abedallah Shelbayh; Duurenbayar Erdenebayar	6; 0	6; 1
3	(Jordan) (Mongolia)	Mohammad Al-Aisowi / Mousa Alkotop; Tamir Ankhbayar / Angarag Enkhbaatar	6; 0	6; 0

==== Turkmenistan vs. Guam ====
Turkmenistan
3
Jordan Tennis Federation, Amman, Jordan
12 September
Hard

Guam
0

			1	2	3
1	(Turkmenistan) (Guam)	Arslan Orashev; Camden Camacho	6; 2	6; 1
2	(Turkmenistan) (Guam)	Isa Mämmetgulyýew; Christopher Cajigan	6; 0	6; 0
3	(Turkmenistan) (Guam)	Atlymyrat Gurbanov / Yuriy Rogusskiy; Joshua Cepeda / Derek Okuhama	7^{10} 6^{8}	6; 0

==== Jordan vs. Guam ====
Jordan
3
Jordan Tennis Federation, Amman, Jordan
13 September
Hard

Guam
0

			1	2	3
1	(Jordan) (Guam)	Abedallah Shelbayh; Derek Okuhama	6; 1	6; 2
2	(Jordan) (Guam)	Mousa Alkotop; Camden Camacho	6; 0	6; 0
3	(Jordan) (Guam)	Seif Adas / Mohammad Al-Aisowi; Christopher Cajigan / Joshua Cepeda	6; 3	6; 4

==== Mongolia vs. Turkmenistan ====
Mongolia
0
Jordan Tennis Federation, Amman, Jordan
13 September
Hard

Turkmenistan
3

			1	2	3
1	(Mongolia) (Turkmenistan)	Tamir Ankhbayar; Arslan Orashev	1; 6	5; 7
2	(Mongolia) (Turkmenistan)	Angarag Enkhbaatar; Isa Mämmetgulyýew	1; 6	0; 6
3	(Mongolia) (Turkmenistan)	Duurenbayar Erdenebayar / Sukhjargal Sukhbaatar; Atlymyrat Gurbanov / Yuriy Rogusskiy	3; 6	4; 6

=== Pool D ===
==== United Arab Emirates vs. Tajikistan ====
United Arab Emirates
3
Jordan Tennis Federation, Amman, Jordan
11 September
Hard

Tajikistan
0

			1	2	3
1	(United Arab Emirates) (Tajikistan)	Fahad Janahi; Aminjon Abdulloev	6; 0	6; 1
2	(United Arab Emirates) (Tajikistan)	Omar Alawadhi; Issamjon Sharifov	6; 2	6; 1
3	(United Arab Emirates) (Tajikistan)	Abdulla Ahli / Hamad Abbas Janahi; Anvar Rakhmatov / Issamjon Sharifov	7; 5	6; 3

==== Cambodia vs. Kyrgyzstan ====
Cambodia
3
Jordan Tennis Federation, Amman, Jordan
11 September
Hard

Kyrgyzstan
0

			1	2	3
1	(Cambodia) (Kyrgyzstan)	Phalkun Mam; Farhad Urumbaev	6; 0	6; 0
2	(Cambodia) (Kyrgyzstan)	Kenny Bun; Kirill Kistanov	6; 4	6; 2
3	(Cambodia) (Kyrgyzstan)	Nysan Tan / Timothy Tep; Ernest Batirbekov / Farhad Urumbaev	6; 0	6; 0

==== United Arab Emirates vs. Kyrgyzstan ====
United Arab Emirates
3
Jordan Tennis Federation, Amman, Jordan
12 September
Hard

Kyrgyzstan
0

			1	2	3
1	(United Arab Emirates) (Kyrgyzstan)	Hamad Abbas Janahi; Ernest Batirbekov	6; 3	6; 0
2	(United Arab Emirates) (Kyrgyzstan)	Omar Alawadhi; Kirill Kistanov	6; 2	6; 0
3	(United Arab Emirates) (Kyrgyzstan)	Abdulla Ahli / Fahad Janahi; Kirill Kistanov / Farhad Urumbaev	6; 1	7^{7} 6^{5}

==== Cambodia vs. Tajikistan ====
Cambodia
3
Jordan Tennis Federation, Amman, Jordan
12 September
Hard

Tajikistan
0

			1	2	3
1	(Cambodia) (Tajikistan)	Phalkun Mam; Aminjon Abdulloev	6; 2	6; 0
2	(Cambodia) (Tajikistan)	Kenny Bun; Issamjon Sharifov	6; 2	6; 0
3	(Cambodia) (Tajikistan)	Nysan Tan / Timothy Tep; Firuz Mukhidinov / Issamjon Sharifov	6; 4	6; 2

==== United Arab Emirates vs. Cambodia ====
United Arab Emirates
3
Jordan Tennis Federation, Amman, Jordan
13 September
Hard

Cambodia
0

			1	2	3
1	(United Arab Emirates) (Cambodia)	Fahad Janahi; Phalkun Mam	6; 4	6; 2
2	(United Arab Emirates) (Cambodia)	Omar Alawadhi; Kenny Bun	4; 6	7; 5	6; 3
3	(United Arab Emirates) (Cambodia)	Abdulla Ahli / Hamad Abbas Janahi; Nysan Tan / Timothy Tep	6; 1	6; 4

==== Tajikistan vs. Kyrgyzstan ====
Tajikistan
1
Jordan Tennis Federation, Amman, Jordan
13 September
Hard

Kyrgyzstan
2

			1	2	3
1	(Tajikistan) (Kyrgyzstan)	Aminjon Abdulloev; Farhad Urumbaev	4; 6	5; 7
2	(Tajikistan) (Kyrgyzstan)	Issamjon Sharifov; Kirill Kistanov	5; 7	6; 3	0; 6
3	(Tajikistan) (Kyrgyzstan)	Aminjon Abdulloev / Issamjon Sharifov; Ernest Batirbekov / Kirill Kistanov	3; 6	6; 4	6; 4

== Playoffs ==
=== 1st to 4th playoffs ===
==== Pacific Oceania vs. United Arab Emirates ====
Pacific Oceania
2
Jordan Tennis Federation, Amman, Jordan
14 September
Hard

United Arab Emirates
0

			1	2	3
1	(Pacific Oceania) (United Arab Emirates)	Matthew Stubbings; Fahad Janahi	6; 2	6; 1
2	(Pacific Oceania) (United Arab Emirates)	Colin Sinclair; Omar Alawadhi	7; 5	3; 6	6; 2
3	(Pacific Oceania) (United Arab Emirates)	Brett Baudinet / Colin Sinclair; Abdulla Ahli / Hamad Abbas Janahi				not played

==== Oman vs. Jordan ====
Oman
0
Jordan Tennis Federation, Amman, Jordan
14 September
Hard

Jordan
2

			1	2	3
1	(Oman) (Jordan)	Mohammed Al Nabhani; Abedallah Shelbayh	4; 6	0; 6
2	(Oman) (Jordan)	Abdullah Al Barwani; Mousa Alkotop	1; 6	5; 7
3	(Oman) (Jordan)	Abdullah Al Barwani / Mohammed Al Nabhani; Mousa Alkotop / Abedallah Shelbayh				not played

=== 5th to 8th playoffs ===
==== Saudi Arabia vs. Cambodia ====
Saudi Arabia
2
Jordan Tennis Federation, Amman, Jordan
14 September
Hard

Cambodia
1

			1	2	3
1	(Saudi Arabia) (Cambodia)	Ammar Alhaqbani; Timothy Tep	6; 0	6; 2
2	(Saudi Arabia) (Cambodia)	Saud Alhaqbani; Kenny Bun	3; 6	1; 6
3	(Saudi Arabia) (Cambodia)	Ammar Alhaqbani / Abdulmajeed Bukhari; Kenny Bun / Phalkun Mam	6; 2	5; 7	7^{8} 6^{6}

==== Iraq vs. Turkmenistan ====
Iraq
0
Jordan Tennis Federation, Amman, Jordan
14 September
Hard

Turkmenistan
2

			1	2	3
1	(Iraq) (Turkmenistan)	Ali Bahadli; Arslan Orashev	1; 6	2; 6
2	(Iraq) (Turkmenistan)	Adil Mustafa Al-Saedi; Isa Mämmetgulyýew	0; 6	0; 6
3	(Iraq) (Turkmenistan)	Akram M. Abdalkarem Al-Saadi / Ali Bahadli; Isa Mämmetgulyýew / Yuriy Rogusskiy				not played

=== 9th to 12th playoffs ===
==== Bangladesh vs. Kyrgyzstan ====
Bangladesh
2
Jordan Tennis Federation, Amman, Jordan
14 September
Hard

Kyrgyzstan
0

			1	2	3
1	(Bangladesh) (Kyrgyzstan)	Shibu Lal; Farhad Urumbaev	6; 4	6; 3
2	(Bangladesh) (Kyrgyzstan)	Sree-Amol Roy; Kirill Kistanov	6; 4	6; 4
3	(Bangladesh) (Kyrgyzstan)	Shibu Lal / Sree-Amol Roy; Ernest Batirbekov / Kirill Kistanov				not played

==== Bahrain vs. Guam ====
Bahrain
1
Jordan Tennis Federation, Amman, Jordan
14 September
Hard

Guam
2

			1	2	3
1	(Bahrain) (Guam)	Hamad Abdulaal; Camden Camacho	2; 6	3; 6
2	(Bahrain) (Guam)	Elyas Abdulnabi; Christopher Cajigan	6; 2	6; 1
3	(Bahrain) (Guam)	Hamad Abdulaal / Kareem Abdulnabi; Camden Camacho / Derek Okuhama	3; 6	1; 6
