= Isa Mämmetgulyýew =

Turkmen tennis player

Isa Mammetgulyyev
- Full name: Isa Mämmetgulyýew
- Country (sports): Turkmenistan
- Residence: Bratislava, Slovakia
- Born: 8 January 1997 (age 28) Ashgabat, Turkmenistan
- Plays: Left-handed (two-handed backhand)
- Prize money: $11,350

Singles
- Career record: 0–0 (at ATP Tour level, Grand Slam level)
- Career titles: 0; 0 Challenger, 0 Futures
- Highest ranking: No. 1,115 (25 July 2016)

Doubles
- Career record: 0–0 (at ATP Tour level, Grand Slam level)
- Career titles: 0; 0 Challenger, 0 Futures
- Highest ranking: No. 1,189 (19 September 2016)

Team competitions
- Davis Cup: 18–11
- Last updated on: 15 August 2022.

Isa Mammetgulyyev (born 8 January 1997) is a Turkmen tennis player. With a world ranking of #1115 in 2016, he became and still remains the highest ranked tennis player in Turkmenistan history.

Mammetgulyyev has a career high ATP singles ranking of 1115 achieved on 25 July 2016. He also has a career high ATP doubles ranking of 1189, achieved on 19 September 2016.

Mammetgulyyev has represented Turkmenistan at Davis Cup, where he has a win–loss record of 18–11.

He played at the 2014 Asian Games on Mixed doubles with Anastasiýa Prenko and Men's team event.

He participated at the 2017 Asian Indoor and Martial Arts Games in Ashgabat, Turkmenistan. In singles he lost at the second round against Hong Kongese Wong Hong Kit. In doubles with Ýuriý Rogusskiý lost against the latest silver medalist Kazakhs duo (Timur Khabibulin-Denis Yevseyev) on the first round. In Mixed doubles with Anastasiýa Prenko lost against the latest champion on the quarter-final.

== Personal life ==
Isa Mammetgulyyev was born in Ashgabat, Turkmenistan. He is studying in Bratislava, Slovakia.

Mammetgulyyev trains at the tennis academy of Dominika Cibulková.

== Davis Cup ==
=== Participations: (11–10) ===
Group membership World Group (0–0) WG Play-off (0–0) Group I (0–0) Group II (0–0) Group III (7–9) Group IV (4–1)	Matches by surface Hard (6–3) Clay (5–7) Grass (0–0) Carpet (0–0)	Matches by type Singles (10–6) Doubles (1–4)

- ▲ ▼ indicates the outcome of the Davis Cup match followed by the score, date, place of event, the zonal classification and its phase, and the court surface.

Rubber outcome	No.	Rubber	Match type (partner if any)	Opponent nation	Opponent player(s)	Score
▼0–3; 25 March 2015; National Tennis Centre, Kuala Lumpur, Malaysia; Asia/Oceania Zone Group III Round Robin; Hard surface
Defeat	1	I	Singles	Vietnam	Nguyễn Hoàng Thiên	3–6, 6–7^{(2–7)}
▲2–1; 26 March 2015; National Tennis Centre, Kuala Lumpur, Malaysia; Asia/Oceania Zone Group III Round Robin; Hard surface
Victory	2	II	Singles	Cambodia	Bun Kenny	1–6, 6–3, 6–5 (ret)
▲2–1; 27 March 2015; National Tennis Centre, Kuala Lumpur, Malaysia; Asia/Oceania Zone Group III Round Robin; Hard surface
Victory	3	I	Singles	Syria	Kareem Al Allaf	6–3, 7–6^{(7–1)}
▼0–2; 27 March 2015; National Tennis Centre, Kuala Lumpur, Malaysia; Asia/Oceania Zone Group III Promotional Play off; Hard surface
Defeat	4	II	Singles	Malaysia	Syed Mohd Agil Syed Naguib	3–6, 6–3, 2–6
▼1–2; 11 July 2016; Enghelab Sport Complex, Tehran, Iran; Asia/Oceania Zone Group III Round Robin; Clay surface
Victory	5	II	Singles	Hong Kong	Wong Hong Kit	1–6, 6–3, 6–3
Defeat	6	III	Doubles (with Aleksandr Ernepesov)	Hong Kong	Karan Rastogi / Wong Chun-hun	2–6, 1–6
▼1–2; 13 July 2016; Enghelab Sport Complex, Tehran, Iran; Asia/Oceania Zone Group III Round Robin; Clay surface
Victory	7	II	Singles	Pacific Oceania	William O'Connell	6–3, 6–2
Defeat	8	III	Doubles (with Yuriy Rogusskiy)	Pacific Oceania	Brett Baudinet / Daniel Llarenas	4–6, 6–7^{(9–11)}
▼0–3; 15 July 2016; Enghelab Sport Complex, Tehran, Iran; Asia/Oceania Zone Group III Round Robin; Clay surface
Defeat	9	II	Singles	Iran	Shahin Khaledan	6–7^{(2–7)}, 3–6
▲2–1; 16 July 2016; Enghelab Sport Complex, Tehran, Iran; Asia/Oceania Zone Group III Relegational Play off; Clay surface
Victory	10	II	Singles	Cambodia	Bun Kenny	6–2, 6–1
▼1–2; 17 July 2017; Sri Lanka Tennis Association Center, Colombo, Sri Lanka; Asia/Oceania Zone Group III Round Robin; Clay surface
Victory	11	III	Doubles (with Aleksandr Ernepesov)	Lebanon	Jad Ballout / Najib Fakih	3–6, 7–6^{(7–1)}, 6–4
▼0–3; 18 July 2017; Sri Lanka Tennis Association Center, Colombo, Sri Lanka; Asia/Oceania Zone Group III Round Robin; Clay surface
Defeat	12	II	Singles	Malaysia	Ahmed Deedat Abdul Razak	4–6, 6–3, 2–6
▼1–2; 19-20 July 2017; Sri Lanka Tennis Association Center, Colombo, Sri Lanka; Asia/Oceania Zone Group III Round Robin; Clay surface
Defeat	13	II	Singles	Qatar	Mubarak Shannan Zayid	3–6, 7–6^{(7–4)}, 4–6
▼1–2; 21 July 2017; Sri Lanka Tennis Association Center, Colombo, Sri Lanka; Asia/Oceania Zone Group III Round Robin; Clay surface
Victory	14	II	Singles	United Arab Emirates	Fahad Janahi	6–0, 6–2
Defeat	15	III	Doubles (with Aleksandr Ernepesov)	United Arab Emirates	Omar Alawadhi / Hamad Abbas Janahi	4–6, 7–6^{(7–1)}, 4–6
▼1–2; 22 July 2017; Sri Lanka Tennis Association Center, Colombo, Sri Lanka; Asia/Oceania Zone Group III Relegation Play off; Clay surface
Defeat	16	II	Singles	Pacific Oceania	Colin Sinclair	6–4, 3–6, 2–6
▼1–2; 11 September 2019; Jordan Tennis Federation, Amman, Jordan; Asia/Oceania Zone Group IV Pool C Round robin; Hard surface
Victory	17	II	Singles	Jordan	Mousa Alkotop	7–6^{(7–4)}, 6–2
Defeat	18	III	Doubles (with Ýuriý Rogusskiý)	Jordan	Mousa Alkotop / Abedallah Shelbayh	6–7^{(4–7)}, 3–6
▲3–0; 12 September 2019; Jordan Tennis Federation, Amman, Jordan; Asia/Oceania Zone Group IV Pool C Round robin; Hard surface
Victory	19	II	Singles	Guam	Christopher Cajigan	6–0, 6–0
▲3–0; 13 September 2019; Jordan Tennis Federation, Amman, Jordan; Asia/Oceania Zone Group IV Pool C Round robin; Hard surface
Victory	20	II	Singles	Mongolia	Angarag Enkhbaatar	6–1, 6–0
▲2–0; 14 September 2019; Jordan Tennis Federation, Amman, Jordan; Asia/Oceania Zone Group IV 7th-8th playoff; Hard surface
Victory	21	II	Singles	Iraq	Adel Mustafa Al-Saedi	6–0, 6–0
▲3–0; 18 October 2021; Bahrain Tennis Federation Courts, Isa Town, Bahrain; Asia/Oceania Zone Group IV Pool B Round robin; Hard surface
Victory	22	II	Singles	Iraq	Mohammed Abuzed Saber	7–5, 6–2
▲3–0; 20 October 2021; Bahrain Tennis Federation Courts, Isa Town, Bahrain; Asia/Oceania Zone Group IV Pool B Round robin; Hard surface
Victory	23	II	Singles	Mongolia	Sukhbaatar Puntsag	6–0, 6–0
Victory	24	III	Doubles (with Ýuriý Rogusskiý)	Mongolia	Oyunbold Baatar / Khatansuikh Batbayar	6–0, 6–2
▲3–0; 21 October 2021; Bahrain Tennis Federation Courts, Isa Town, Bahrain; Asia/Oceania Zone Group IV Pool B Round robin; Hard surface
Victory	25	II	Singles	Oman	Isa Ali Alsuleimani	6–0, 6–0
Victory	26	III	Doubles (with Ýuriý Rogusskiý)	Oman	Ali Al-Busaidi / Isa Ali Alsuleimani	6–0, 6–1
▼1–2; 21 October 2021; Bahrain Tennis Federation Courts, Isa Town, Bahrain; Asia/Oceania Zone Group IV Promotional playoff; Hard surface
Victory	27	II	Singles	United Arab Emirates	Omar Al-Awadhi	6–2, 6–0
Defeat	28	III	Doubles (with Ýuriý Rogusskiý)	United Arab Emirates	Abdulrahman Al Janahi / Hamad Abbas Janahi	6–7^{(6–8)}, 3–6

== Sources ==
- Isa Mämmetgulyýew at the Association of Tennis Professionals
- Isa Mämmetgulyýew at the International Tennis Federation
- Isa Mämmetgulyýew at the Davis Cup
