= 2017 Davis Cup Asia/Oceania Zone Group III =

International tennis competition

The Asia/Oceania Zone was the unique zone within Group 3 of the regional Davis Cup competition in 2017. The zone's competition was held in round robin format in Colombo, Sri Lanka, from 17 July to 22 July 2017. The two winning nations won promotion to Group II, Asia/Oceania Zone, for 2018.

== Participating nations ==
- Jordan
- Lebanon
- Malaysia
- Pacific Oceania
- Qatar
- Sri Lanka
- Syria
- Turkmenistan
- United Arab Emirates

== Draw ==
Date: 17–22 July

Location: Sri Lanka Tennis Association, Colombo, Sri Lanka (clay)

Format: Round-robin basis. Two pools of four and five teams, respectively (Pools A and B). The winner of each pool plays off against the runner-up of the other pool to determine which two nations are promoted to Asia/Oceania Zone Group II in 2018.

Seeding: The seeding was based on the Davis Cup Rankings of 10 April 2017 (shown in parentheses below).

Pot 1	Pot 2	Pot 3	Pot 4
1. Sri Lanka (78); 2. Lebanon (88)	3. Malaysia (89); 4. Syria (93)	5. Pacific Oceania (97); 6. Qatar (100)	7. United Arab Emirates (103); 8. Jordan (104); 9. Turkmenistan (105)

=== Pool A ===
		SRI	JOR	POC	SYR	RR; W–L	Set; W–L	Game; W–L	Standings
78	Sri Lanka		2–1	2–1	2–1	3–0	12–6 (67%)	96–66 (59%)	1
104	Jordan	1–2		2–1	2–1	2–1	10–9 (53%)	82–95 (46%)	2
97	Pacific Oceania	1–2	1–2		2–1	1–2	10–11 (48%)	91–91 (50%)	3
93	Syria	1–2	1–2	1–2		0–3	7–13 (35%)	78–95 (45%)	4

Standings are determined by: 1. number of wins; 2. number of matches; 3. in two-team ties, head-to-head records; 4. in three-team ties, (a) percentage of sets won (head-to-head records if two teams remain tied), then (b) percentage of games won (head-to-head records if two teams remain tied), then (c) Davis Cup rankings.

=== Pool B ===
		LBN	QAT	MAS	UAE	TKM	RR; W–L	Set; W–L	Game; W–L	Standings
88	Lebanon		3–0	2–1	2–1	2–1	4–0	19–8 (70%)	147–100 (60%)	1
100	Qatar	0–3		2–0	2–1	2–1	3–1	15–12 (56%)	118–111 (52%)	2
89	Malaysia	1–2	0–2		2–1	3–0	2–2	14–11 (56%)	121–100 (55%)	3
103	United Arab Emirates	1–2	1–2	1–2		2–1	1–3	11–17 (39%)	109–142 (43%)	4
105	Turkmenistan	1–2	1–2	0–3	1–2		0–4	9–20 (31%)	111–153 (42%)	5

Standings are determined by: 1. number of wins; 2. number of matches; 3. in two-team ties, head-to-head records; 4. in three-team ties, (a) percentage of sets won (head-to-head records if two teams remain tied), then (b) percentage of games won (head-to-head records if two teams remain tied), then (c) Davis Cup rankings.

=== Playoffs ===
Placing	A Team	Score	B Team
Promotional	Sri Lanka	2–0	Qatar
Promotional	Jordan	0–2	Lebanon
5th	—N/a		Malaysia
Relegation	Pacific Oceania	2–1	Turkmenistan
Relegation	Syria	2–0	United Arab Emirates

- Sri Lanka and Lebanon promoted to Group II in 2018.
- Turkmenistan and United Arab Emirates relegated to Group IV in 2018.

== Round robin ==
=== Pool A ===
==== Sri Lanka vs. Jordan ====
Sri Lanka
2
Sri Lanka Tennis Association, Colombo, Sri Lanka
17 July 2017
Clay

Jordan
1

			1	2	3
1	(Sri Lanka) (Jordan)	Harshana Godamanna; Seif Adas	6; 3	6; 2
2	(Sri Lanka) (Jordan)	Sharmal Dissanayake; Mousa Alkotop	6; 2	6; 4
3	(Sri Lanka) (Jordan)	Sharmal Dissanayake / Harshana Godamanna; Hamzeh Al-Aswad / Mousa Alkotop	4; 6	5; 6		retired

==== Syria vs. Pacific Oceania ====
Syria
1
Sri Lanka Tennis Association, Colombo, Sri Lanka
17 July 2017
Clay

Pacific Oceania
2

			1	2	3
1	(Syria) (Pacific Oceania)	Yacoub Makzoume; Heve Kelley	3; 6	6; 1	2; 6
2	(Syria) (Pacific Oceania)	Kareem Al Allaf; Colin Sinclair	4; 6	0; 6
3	(Syria) (Pacific Oceania)	Yacoub Makzoume / Majdi Salim; Brett Baudinet / Aymeric Mara	6; 3	1; 6	6; 3

==== Sri Lanka vs. Pacific Oceania ====
Sri Lanka
2
Sri Lanka Tennis Association, Colombo, Sri Lanka
19 July 2017
Clay

Pacific Oceania
1

			1	2	3
1	(Sri Lanka) (Pacific Oceania)	Harshana Godamanna; Heve Kelley	6; 1	6; 3
2	(Sri Lanka) (Pacific Oceania)	Sharmal Dissanayake; Colin Sinclair	4; 6	4; 6
3	(Sri Lanka) (Pacific Oceania)	Sharmal Dissanayake / Harshana Godamanna; Brett Baudinet / Aymeric Mara	6; 3	6; 1

==== Syria vs. Jordan ====
Syria
1
Sri Lanka Tennis Association, Colombo, Sri Lanka
19–20 July 2017
Clay

Jordan
2

			1	2	3
1	(Syria) (Jordan)	Yacoub Makzoume; Seif Adas	6; 1	6; 1
2	(Syria) (Jordan)	Kareem Al Allaf; Mousa Alkotop	4; 6	5; 7
3	(Syria) (Jordan)	Kareem Al Allaf / Yacoub Makzoume; Hamzeh Al-Aswad / Mousa Alkotop	4; 6	3; 6

==== Sri Lanka vs. Syria ====
Sri Lanka
2
Sri Lanka Tennis Association, Colombo, Sri Lanka
20 July 2017
Clay

Syria
1

			1	2	3
1	(Sri Lanka) (Syria)	Harshana Godamanna; Yacoub Makzoume	6; 1	6; 3
2	(Sri Lanka) (Syria)	Sharmal Dissanayake; Kareem Al Allaf	1; 6	6^{2} 7^{7}
3	(Sri Lanka) (Syria)	Sharmal Dissanayake / Harshana Godamanna; Kareem Al Allaf / Majdi Salim	6; 4	6; 1

==== Pacific Oceania vs. Jordan ====
Pacific Oceania
1
Sri Lanka Tennis Association, Colombo, Sri Lanka
20 July 2017
Clay

Jordan
2

			1	2	3
1	(Pacific Oceania) (Jordan)	Heve Kelley; Mousa Alkotop	7; 5	1; 6	6^{2} 7^{7}
2	(Pacific Oceania) (Jordan)	Colin Sinclair; Mohammed Alyamani	6; 1	6; 0
3	(Pacific Oceania) (Jordan)	Brett Baudinet / Aymeric Mara; Hamzeh Al-Aswad / Mousa Alkotop	4; 6	4; 6

=== Pool B ===
==== Lebanon vs. Turkmenistan ====
Lebanon
2
Sri Lanka Tennis Association, Colombo, Sri Lanka
17 July 2017
Clay

Turkmenistan
1

			1	2	3
1	(Lebanon) (Turkmenistan)	Hady Habib; Georgiy Pochay	6; 0	6; 1
2	(Lebanon) (Turkmenistan)	Giovani Samaha; Yuriy Rogusskiy	7^{7} 6^{1}	6; 2
3	(Lebanon) (Turkmenistan)	Jad Ballout / Najib Fakih; Aleksandr Ernepesov / Isa Mammetgulyyev	6; 3	6^{1} 7^{7}	4; 6

==== Qatar vs. United Arab Emirates ====
Qatar
2
Sri Lanka Tennis Association, Colombo, Sri Lanka
17 July 2017
Clay

United Arab Emirates
1

			1	2	3
1	(Qatar) (United Arab Emirates)	Jabor Al-Mutawa; Omar Alawadhi	6; 2	4; 6	1; 6
2	(Qatar) (United Arab Emirates)	Mubarak Shannan Zayid; Fahad Janahi	6; 2	6; 0
3	(Qatar) (United Arab Emirates)	Mousa Shanan Zayed / Mubarak Shannan Zayid; Omar Alawadhi / Hamad Abbas Janahi	6; 4	6; 4

==== Lebanon vs. United Arab Emirates ====
Lebanon
2
Sri Lanka Tennis Association, Colombo, Sri Lanka
18 July 2017
Clay

United Arab Emirates
1

			1	2	3
1	(Lebanon) (United Arab Emirates)	Najib Fakih; Abdulrahman Al Janahi	6; 1	4; 6	6; 4
2	(Lebanon) (United Arab Emirates)	Hady Habib; Omar Alawadhi	6; 3	7; 5
3	(Lebanon) (United Arab Emirates)	Jad Ballout / Hady Habib; Fahad Janahi / Hamad Abbas Janahi	3; 6	5; 7

==== Malaysia vs. Turkmenistan ====
Malaysia
3
Sri Lanka Tennis Association, Colombo, Sri Lanka
18 July 2017
Clay

Turkmenistan
0

			1	2	3
1	(Malaysia) (Turkmenistan)	Mohd Assri Merzuki; Yuriy Rogusskiy	6; 3	6; 1
2	(Malaysia) (Turkmenistan)	Ahmed Deedat Abdul Razak; Isa Mammetgulyyev	6; 4	3; 6	6; 2
3	(Malaysia) (Turkmenistan)	Christian Didier Chin / Mohd Assri Merzuki; Aleksandr Ernepesov / Yuriy Rogusskiy	6; 1	6; 4

==== Lebanon vs. Malaysia ====
Lebanon
2
Sri Lanka Tennis Association, Colombo, Sri Lanka
19 July 2017
Clay

Malaysia
1

			1	2	3
1	(Lebanon) (Malaysia)	Hady Habib; Christian Didier Chin	6; 2	6; 4
2	(Lebanon) (Malaysia)	Giovani Samaha; Ahmed Deedat Abdul Razak	6; 3	7^{7} 6^{1}
3	(Lebanon) (Malaysia)	Jad Ballout / Najib Fakih; Koay Hao-sheng / Mohd Assri Merzuki	4; 6	3; 6

==== Qatar vs. Turkmenistan ====
Qatar
2
Sri Lanka Tennis Association, Colombo, Sri Lanka
19–20 July 2017
Clay

Turkmenistan
1

			1	2	3
1	(Qatar) (Turkmenistan)	Mousa Shanan Zayed; Yuriy Rogusskiy	1; 1			retired
2	(Qatar) (Turkmenistan)	Mubarak Shannan Zayid; Isa Mammetgulyyev	6; 3	6^{4} 7^{7}	6; 4
3	(Qatar) (Turkmenistan)	Jabor Al-Mutawa / Mousa Shanan Zayed; Aleksandr Ernepesov / Georgiy Pochay	4; 6	6; 4	1; 2	retired

==== Lebanon vs. Qatar ====
Lebanon
3
Sri Lanka Tennis Association, Colombo, Sri Lanka
20 July 2017
Clay

Qatar
0

			1	2	3
1	(Lebanon) (Qatar)	Hady Habib; Jabor Al-Mutawa	6; 1	6; 1
2	(Lebanon) (Qatar)	Giovani Samaha; Mubarak Shannan Zayid	1; 6	6; 4	6; 4
3	(Lebanon) (Qatar)	Jad Ballout / Najib Fakih; Mousa Shanan Zayed / Mubarak Shannan Zayid				w/o

==== Malaysia vs. United Arab Emirates ====
Malaysia
2
Sri Lanka Tennis Association, Colombo, Sri Lanka
20 July 2017
Clay

United Arab Emirates
1

			1	2	3
1	(Malaysia) (United Arab Emirates)	Mohd Assri Merzuki; Hamad Abbas Janahi	6; 1	6; 1
2	(Malaysia) (United Arab Emirates)	Ahmed Deedat Abdul Razak; Omar Alawadhi	6^{6} 7^{8}	6; 0	0; 6
3	(Malaysia) (United Arab Emirates)	Christian Didier Chin / Mohd Assri Merzuki; Fahad Janahi / Hamad Abbas Janahi	6; 2	6; 4

==== Malaysia vs. Qatar ====
Malaysia
0
Sri Lanka Tennis Association, Colombo, Sri Lanka
21 July 2017
Clay

Qatar
2

			1	2	3
1	(Malaysia) (Qatar)	Koay Hao-sheng; Jabor Al-Mutawa	6^{7} 7^{9}	6; 1	4; 6
2	(Malaysia) (Qatar)	Mohd Assri Merzuki; Mubarak Shannan Zayid	3; 2			retired
3	(Malaysia) (Qatar)	Christian Didier Chin / Mohd Assri Merzuki; Mousa Shanan Zayed / Mubarak Shannan Zayid				not played

==== United Arab Emirates vs. Turkmenistan ====
United Arab Emirates
2
Sri Lanka Tennis Association, Colombo, Sri Lanka
21 July 2017
Clay

Turkmenistan
1

			1	2	3
1	(United Arab Emirates) (Turkmenistan)	Omar Alawadhi; Georgiy Pochay	6; 4	6; 3
2	(United Arab Emirates) (Turkmenistan)	Fahad Janahi; Isa Mammetgulyyev	0; 6	2; 6
3	(United Arab Emirates) (Turkmenistan)	Omar Alawadhi / Hamad Abbas Janahi; Aleksandr Ernepesov / Isa Mammetgulyyev	6; 4	6^{1} 7^{7}	6; 4

== Playoffs ==
=== Promotional playoffs ===
==== Sri Lanka vs. Qatar ====
Sri Lanka
2
Sri Lanka Tennis Association, Colombo, Sri Lanka
22 July 2017
Clay

Qatar
0

			1	2	3
1	(Sri Lanka) (Qatar)	Harshana Godamanna; Mousa Shanan Zayed	6; 3	6; 3
2	(Sri Lanka) (Qatar)	Sharmal Dissanayake; Mubarak Shannan Zayid	6; 4	6; 3
3	(Sri Lanka) (Qatar)	Sharmal Dissanayake / Harshana Godamanna; Mousa Shanan Zayed / Mubarak Shannan Zayid				not played

==== Lebanon vs. Jordan ====
Lebanon
2
Sri Lanka Tennis Association, Colombo, Sri Lanka
22 July 2017
Clay

Jordan
0

			1	2	3
1	(Lebanon) (Jordan)	Hady Habib; Hamzeh Al-Aswad	6; 2	6; 0
2	(Lebanon) (Jordan)	Giovani Samaha; Mousa Alkotop	6; 4	3; 6	6; 2
3	(Lebanon) (Jordan)	Jad Ballout / Najib Fakih; Hamzeh Al-Aswad / Mousa Alkotop				not played

=== Relegation playoffs ===
==== Pacific Oceania vs. Turkmenistan ====
Pacific Oceania
2
Sri Lanka Tennis Association, Colombo, Sri Lanka
22 July 2017
Clay

Turkmenistan
1

			1	2	3
1	(Pacific Oceania) (Turkmenistan)	Heve Kelley; Aleksandr Ernepesov	3; 6	6; 1	4; 6
2	(Pacific Oceania) (Turkmenistan)	Colin Sinclair; Isa Mammetgulyyev	4; 6	6; 3	6; 2
3	(Pacific Oceania) (Turkmenistan)	Brett Baudinet / Aymeric Mara; Aleksandr Ernepesov / Georgiy Pochay	6; 4	6; 1

==== Syria vs. United Arab Emirates ====
Syria
2
Sri Lanka Tennis Association, Colombo, Sri Lanka
22 July 2017
Clay

United Arab Emirates
0

			1	2	3
1	(Syria) (United Arab Emirates)	Yacoub Makzoume; Omar Alawadhi	4; 6	6; 2	6; 3
2	(Syria) (United Arab Emirates)	Kareem Al Allaf; Fahad Janahi	6; 4	6; 2
3	(Syria) (United Arab Emirates)	Kareem Al Allaf / Majdi Salim; Omar Alawadhi / Hamad Abbas Janahi				not played
