= 2006 Davis Cup Asia/Oceania Zone Group IV =

International tennis competition

The Asian and Oceanian Zone is one of the three zones of regional Davis Cup competition in 2006.

In the Asian and Oceanian Zone there are four different groups in which teams compete against each other to advance to the next group.

The Group IV tournament was held April 6–9, in Al Hussein Tennis Club, Amman, Jordan, on outdoor hard courts.

== Format ==
There will be a Round Robin where the nine teams will compete in two pools. The winner of each pool will be promoted to the Asia and Oceania Group III in 2007.

== Pool A ==
	Pool A	OMA	IRQ	MYA	QAT
1	Oman (3–0)		3–0	3–0	3–0
2	Iraq (2–1)	0–3		2–1	2–1
3	Myanmar (1–2)	0–3	1–2		2–1
4	Qatar (0–3)	0–3	1–2	1–2	

- Oman advances to Asia/Oceania Group III in 2007.

=== Iraq vs. Qatar ===
Iraq
2
Al Hussein Tennis Club, Amman, Jordan
6 April 2006
Hard

Qatar
1

			1	2	3
1	(Iraq) (Qatar)	Haidar Kadhim; Abdulla Al-Haji	6; 4	6; 4
2	(Iraq) (Qatar)	Nasir Al Hatam; Sultan Khalfan Al Alawi	4; 6	2; 6
3	(Iraq) (Qatar)	Nasir Al Hatam / Haidar Kadhim; Abdulla Al-Haji / Sultan Khalfan Al Alawi	6; 1	6; 1

=== Oman vs. Myanmar ===
Oman
3
Al Hussein Tennis Club, Amman, Jordan
6–7 April 2006
Hard

Myanmar
0

			1	2	3
1	(Oman) (Myanmar)	Mohammed Al Nabhani; Kyaw Zaw Naing	6; 1	6; 2
2	(Oman) (Myanmar)	Khalid Al Nabhani; Maung-Tu Maw	6; 4	6; 3
3	(Oman) (Myanmar)	Khalid Al Nabhani / Mohammed Al Nabhani; Maung-Tu Maw / Kyaw Zaw Naing	7^{7} 6^{4}	4; 6	6; 2

=== Iraq vs. Oman ===
Iraq
0
Al Hussein Tennis Club, Amman, Jordan
7 April 2006
Hard

Oman
3

			1	2	3
1	(Iraq) (Oman)	Saddam-Hussain Kadhim; Mohammed Al Nabhani	4; 6	2; 6
2	(Iraq) (Oman)	Nasir Al Hatam; Khalid Al Nabhani	2; 6	0; 6
3	(Iraq) (Oman)	Nasir Al Hatam / Akram M Abdalkarem Al-Saadi; Khalid Al Nabhani / Mohammed Al Nabhani	1; 6	2; 6

=== Qatar vs. Myanmar ===
Qatar
1
Al Hussein Tennis Club, Amman, Jordan
7 April 2006
Hard

Myanmar
2

			1	2	3
1	(Qatar) (Myanmar)	Abdulla Al-Haji; Kyaw Zaw Naing	4; 6	4; 6
2	(Qatar) (Myanmar)	Sultan Khalfan Al Alawi; Maung-Tu Maw	6; 0	6; 0
3	(Qatar) (Myanmar)	Abdulla Al-Haji / Sultan Khalfan Al Alawi; Maung-Tu Maw / Kyaw Zaw Naing	6^{8} 7^{10}	2; 6

=== Iraq vs. Myanmar ===
Iraq
2
Al Hussein Tennis Club, Amman, Jordan
9 April 2006
Hard

Myanmar
1

			1	2	3
1	(Iraq) (Myanmar)	Saddam-Hussain Kadhim; Kyaw Zaw Naing	3; 6	6; 1	6; 0
2	(Iraq) (Myanmar)	Nasir Al Hatam; Maung-Tu Maw	2; 6	4; 6
3	(Iraq) (Myanmar)	Nasir Al Hatam / Haidar Kadhim; Maung-Tu Maw / Kyaw Zaw Naing	4; 6	4; 2		retired

=== Oman vs. Qatar ===
Oman
3
Al Hussein Tennis Club, Amman, Jordan
9 April 2006
Hard

Qatar
0

			1	2	3
1	(Oman) (Qatar)	Mohammed Al Nabhani; Feras Al-Naama	6; 0	6; 1
2	(Oman) (Qatar)	Khalid Al Nabhani; Abdulla Al-Haji	6; 1	6; 1
3	(Oman) (Qatar)	Fahad-Qamar Al Hashmi / Khalid Al Nabhani; Feras Al-Naama / Faisal Al Jarboey	6; 1	6; 2

== Pool B ==
	Pool B	UAE	SYR	TJK	JOR	TKM
1	United Arab Emirates (4–0)		2–1	3–0	3–0	3–0
2	Syria (3–1)	1–2		2–1	2–1	3–0
3	Tajikistan (2–2)	0–3	1–2		2–1	3–0
4	Jordan (1–3)	0–3	1–2	1–2		3–0
5	Turkmenistan (0–4)	0–3	0–3	0–3	0–3	

- United Arab Emirates advances to Asia/Oceania Group III in 2007.

=== Tajikistan vs. Turkmenistan ===
Tajikistan
3
Al Hussein Tennis Club, Amman, Jordan
6 April 2006
Hard

Turkmenistan
0

			1	2	3
1	(Tajikistan) (Turkmenistan)	Mirkhusein Yakhyaev; Dovran Chagylov	7; 5	6; 3
2	(Tajikistan) (Turkmenistan)	Dilshod Sharifi; Ruslan Almazov	6; 0	6; 1
3	(Tajikistan) (Turkmenistan)	Farhod Saidov / Dilshod Sharifi; Dovran Chagylov / Shirali Javliev	6; 1	6; 2

=== United Arab Emirates vs. Jordan ===
United Arab Emirates
3
Al Hussein Tennis Club, Amman, Jordan
6 April 2006
Hard

Jordan
0

			1	2	3
1	(United Arab Emirates) (Jordan)	Mahmoud Nader Al Blooshi; Tareq Talal Shkakwa	6; 2	1; 6	6; 2
2	(United Arab Emirates) (Jordan)	Omar Alawadhi; Abdullah Fadda	6; 3	6; 1
3	(United Arab Emirates) (Jordan)	Omar Alawadhi / Hamad Abbas Janahi; Ahmed Ibrahim Ahmad Alhadid / Ahmed Tbayshat	6; 1	6; 1

=== Turkmenistan vs. Syria ===
Turkmenistan
0
Al Hussein Tennis Club, Amman, Jordan
6–7 April 2006
Hard

Syria
3

			1	2	3
1	(Turkmenistan) (Syria)	Eziz Dovletov; Issam Haitham Taweel	0; 6	1; 6
2	(Turkmenistan) (Syria)	Shirali Javliev; Hayan Maarouf	3; 6	3; 6
3	(Turkmenistan) (Syria)	Ruslan Almazov / Eziz Dovletov; Majdi Salim / Yashar Sheet	1; 6	2; 6

=== Tajikistan vs. Jordan ===
Tajikistan
2
Al Hussein Tennis Club, Amman, Jordan
7 April 2006
Hard

Jordan
1

			1	2	3
1	(Tajikistan) (Jordan)	Mirkhusein Yakhyaev; Tareq Talal Shkakwa	3; 6	6; 3	9; 7
2	(Tajikistan) (Jordan)	Dilshod Sharifi; Abdullah Fadda	7^{7} 6^{5}	3; 6	6; 4
3	(Tajikistan) (Jordan)	Rahmatullo Rajabaliev / Mirkhusein Yakhyaev; Ahmed Ibrahim Ahmad Alhadid / Ahmed Tbayshat	5; 7	4; 6

=== United Arab Emirates vs. Syria ===
United Arab Emirates
2
Al Hussein Tennis Club, Amman, Jordan
7 April 2006
Hard

Syria
1

			1	2	3
1	(United Arab Emirates) (Syria)	Mahmoud Nader Al Blooshi; Issam Haitham Taweel	7^{8} 6^{6}	0; 6	0; 6
2	(United Arab Emirates) (Syria)	Omar Alawadhi; Hayan Maarouf	6; 0	6; 1
3	(United Arab Emirates) (Syria)	Mahmoud Nader Al Blooshi / Omar Alawadhi; Majdi Salim / Issam Haitham Taweel	6; 2	6; 1

=== Turkmenistan vs. Jordan ===
Turkmenistan
0
Al Hussein Tennis Club, Amman, Jordan
7–8 April 2006
Hard

Jordan
3

			1	2	3
1	(Turkmenistan) (Jordan)	Dovran Chagylov; Tareq Talal Shkakwa	0; 6	2; 6
2	(Turkmenistan) (Jordan)	Ruslan Almazov; Abdullah Fadda	1; 6	2; 6
3	(Turkmenistan) (Jordan)	Ruslan Almazov / Dovran Chagylov; Abdullah Fadda / Tareq Talal Shkakwa	0; 6	4; 6

=== Tajikistan vs. Syria ===
Tajikistan
1
Al Hussein Tennis Club, Amman, Jordan
8 April 2006
Hard

Syria
2

			1	2	3
1	(Tajikistan) (Syria)	Mirkhusein Yakhyaev; Issam Haitham Taweel	6; 3	6; 2
2	(Tajikistan) (Syria)	Dilshod Sharifi; Hayan Maarouf	6^{3} 7^{7}	6; 1	2; 6
3	(Tajikistan) (Syria)	Dilshod Sharifi / Mirkhusein Yakhyaev; Majdi Salim / Yashar Sheet	4; 6	4; 6

=== Turkmenistan vs. United Arab Emirates ===
Turkmenistan
0
Al Hussein Tennis Club, Amman, Jordan
8 April 2006
Hard

United Arab Emirates
3

			1	2	3
1	(Turkmenistan) (United Arab Emirates)	Eziz Dovletov; Mahmoud Nader Al Blooshi	1; 6	1; 6
2	(Turkmenistan) (United Arab Emirates)	Ruslan Almazov; Omar Alawadhi	0; 6	0; 6
3	(Turkmenistan) (United Arab Emirates)	Ruslan Almazov / Dovran Chagylov; Faisal Bastaki / Hamad Abbas Janahi	3; 6	3; 6

=== Tajikistan vs. United Arab Emirates ===
Tajikistan
0
Al Hussein Tennis Club, Amman, Jordan
9 April 2006
Hard

United Arab Emirates
3

			1	2	3
1	(Tajikistan) (United Arab Emirates)	Mirkhusein Yakhyaev; Mahmoud Nader Al Blooshi	7; 5	3; 6	4; 6
2	(Tajikistan) (United Arab Emirates)	Dilshod Sharifi; Omar Alawadhi	7^{7} 6^{4}	2; 6	2; 6
3	(Tajikistan) (United Arab Emirates)	Rahmatullo Rajabaliev / Farhod Saidov; Faisal Bastaki / Hamad Abbas Janahi	2; 6	1; 6

=== Syria vs. Jordan ===
Syria
2
Al Hussein Tennis Club, Amman, Jordan
9 April 2006
Hard

Jordan
1

			1	2	3
1	(Syria) (Jordan)	Issam Haitham Taweel; Tareq Talal Shkakwa	6; 2	6^{6} 7^{8}	6; 2
2	(Syria) (Jordan)	Hayan Maarouf; Abdullah Fadda	3; 6	2; 6
3	(Syria) (Jordan)	Majdi Salim / Yashar Sheet; Abdullah Fadda / Tareq Talal Shkakwa	6; 2	2; 6	6; 2
