= List of highest ranked tennis players per country =

This article lists the professional tennis players who reached the highest ranking among their compatriots during the Open Era. The rankings used are ATP rankings for men (since 23 August 1973 for singles, and 1 March 1976 for doubles) and WTA rankings for women (since 3 November 1975 for singles, and 4 September 1984 for doubles).

On 11 September 2017, Garbiñe Muguruza and Rafael Nadal made Spain the first country since the United States 14 years ago to simultaneously top both the ATP and the WTA rankings, with Muguruza making her debut in the No. 1 spot. The most recent previous such pair were Serena Williams and Andre Agassi, 28 April to 11 May 2003.

== Top ranked by country – singles ==
=== Men ===
Nation	Ranking	Player(s)	Date reached
Algeria	114	Lamine Ouahab	21 September 2009
Andorra	505	Joan Jiménez-Guerra	11 October 1999
Angola	1142	Nélson de Almeida	14 June 1999
Antigua and Barbuda	1021	Jody Maginley	21 October 2019
Argentina	2	Guillermo Vilas	30 April 1975
Armenia	38	Sargis Sargsian	12 January 2004
Aruba	453	Jose-Luis Muguruza	12 June 2006
Australia	1	John Newcombe; Patrick Rafter; Lleyton Hewitt	3 June 1974; 26 July 1999; 19 November 2001
Austria	1	Thomas Muster	12 February 1996
Azerbaijan	247	Emin Ağayev	21 June 2004
Bahamas	96	Roger Smith; Mark Knowles	1 August 1988; 24 June 1996
Bahrain	1413	Abdul-Rahman Shehab	20 September 2004
Bangladesh	1242	Hira Lal	10 June 1996
Barbados	106	Darian King	8 May 2017
Belarus	18	Max Mirnyi	18 August 2003
Belgium	7	David Goffin	20 November 2017
Benin	354	Arnaud Segodo	2 February 2004
Bermuda	457	Steven Alger	4 January 1981
Bolivia	32	Mario Martinez	12 September 1983
Bosnia and Herzegovina	23	Damir Džumhur	2 July 2018
Botswana	1155	Petrus Molefe	13 December 1999
Brazil	1	Gustavo Kuerten	4 December 2000
Brunei	1096	Ak Aki Ismasufian	11 January 1993
Bulgaria	3	Grigor Dimitrov	20 November 2017
Burkina Faso	1580	Joel Meda	30 April 2018
Burundi	610	Guy Orly Iradukunda	14 January 2019
Cambodia	995	Bun Kenny	17 October 2022
Cameroon	1070	Pierre Otolo-Metomo	19 December 2001
Canada	3	Milos Raonic	21 November 2016
Cayman Islands	1146	Nigel Mitten	14 July 2003
Central African Republic	904	Samir Douat M'Bioka	7 July 1997
Chile	1	Marcelo Ríos	30 March 1998
China	31	Zhang Zhizhen	22 July 2024
Chinese Taipei	33	Lu Yen-hsun	1 November 2010
Colombia	28	Santiago Giraldo	29 September 2014
Costa Rica	55	Juan Antonio Marín	11 October 1999
Croatia	2	Goran Ivanišević*	4 July 1994
Cuba	131	Mario Tabares	28 August 1989
Curacao	1139	Michael-John Every	17 February 2020
Cyprus	8	Marcos Baghdatis	21 August 2006
Czech Republic	2	Petr Korda	2 February 1998
Czechoslovakia	1	Ivan Lendl	28 February 1983
DRC	1157	Bienvenue Bolangi	25 May 2026
Denmark	4	Holger Rune	21 August 2023
Dominican Republic	43	Víctor Estrella	13 July 2015
Ecuador	4	Andrés Gómez	11 June 1990
Egypt	34	Ismail El Shafei	8 April 1975
El Salvador	139	Marcelo Arévalo	2 July 2018
Estonia	71	Jürgen Zopp	10 September 2012
Finland	13	Jarkko Nieminen	10 July 2006
France	3	Yannick Noah	7 July 1986
Gabon	1385	Kryce-Didier Momo-Kassa	3 November 2003
Georgia	16	Nikoloz Basilashvili	27 May 2019
Germany	1	Boris Becker; Alexander Zverev	28 January 1991; 2 November 2026
Ghana	275	Henry Adjei-Darko	30 January 2006
Greece	3	Stefanos Tsitsipas	9 August 2021
Guadeloupe	1163	Jean-Christian Morandais	23 September 2024
Guam	1591	Christopher Cajigan	30 July 2018
Guatemala	275	Christopher Díaz Figueroa	30 September 2013
Haiti	22	Ronald Agénor	8 May 1989
Honduras	1580	Jaime Bendeck	30 April 2018
Hong Kong	85	Coleman Wong	2 November 2026
Hungary	12	Balázs Taróczy	5 April 1982
Iceland	703	Arnar Sigurdsson	7 May 2007
India	18	Vijay Amritraj	20 October 1980
Indonesia	240	Suwandi	18 June 2001
Iran	146	Taghi Akbari	3 June 1974
Ireland	129 (Note: Matt Doyle ranked world number 56 in 1983. He represented Ireland in the Davis Cup from 1981 but did not acquire Irish nationality until 1985.)	Conor Niland	6 December 2010
Israel	18	Amos Mansdorf	16 November 1987
Italy	1	Jannik Sinner	10 June 2024
Ivory Coast	200	Claude N'Goran	7 August 1995
Jamaica	98 (Note: Although Brown has a career high singles ranking of 64 in October 2016, he switched nationalities to represent Germany starting on 1 November 2010.)	Dustin Brown	26 July 2010
Japan	4	Kei Nishikori	2 March 2015
Jordan	181	Abdullah Shelbayh	29 January 2024
Kazakhstan	10	Alexander Bublik	12 January 2026
Kenya	100	Paul Wekesa	1 May 1995
Kosovo	790	Vullnet Tashi	23 July 2018
Kuwait	336	Mohammad Ghareeb	17 July 2006
Kyrgyzstan	607	Daniiar Duldaev	14 July 2014
Latvia	10	Ernests Gulbis	9 June 2014
Lebanon	154 (Note: Hassan, who has double Lebanese and German nationality, ranked world number 143 on 17 June 2024, but played under German flag in ATP Tour until 30 June 2024 and started playing under Lebanese flag on 1 July 2024.)	Benjamin Hassan	1 July 2024
Libya	1863	Ahmed Mouhan	16 December 2024
Liechtenstein	1614	Vital Flurin Leuch	17 September 2018
Lithuania	50	Ričardas Berankis	23 May 2016
Luxembourg	21	Gilles Müller	31 July 2017
Madagascar	1009	Antso Rakotondramanga	29 April 2013
Malaysia	291	V. Selvam	12 December 1994
Mali	820	Veerawah Selvam	1 October 1990
Malta	875	Gordon Asciak	9 May 1994
Mauritius	570	Kamil Patel	6 December 1999
Mexico	4	Raúl Ramírez	7 November 1976
Moldova	39	Radu Albot	5 August 2019
Monaco	14	Valentin Vacherot	5 October 2026
Montenegro	263	Goran Tošić	7 June 2010
Morocco	14	Younes El Aynaoui	11 March 2003
Mozambique	1764	Bruno Nhavene	19 May 2025
Namibia	976	Jurgens Strydom	12 November 2007
Netherlands	3	Tom Okker	2 March 1974
Netherlands Antilles	218	Jean-Julien Rojer	15 August 2005
New Zealand	18	Onny Parun	16 September 1975
Nicaragua	987	Joaquin Guilleme	13 July 2026
Nigeria	52	Nduka Odizor	11 June 1984
North Macedonia	242	Predrag Rusevski	11 February 2008
Northern Mariana Islands	340	Colin Sinclair	18 September 2023
Norway	2	Casper Ruud	12 September 2022
Oman	1212	Khalid Al Nabhani	17 March 2003
Pakistan	34	Haroon Rahim	24 October 1977
Panama	1417	Alberto Gonzalez	12 February 2007
Paraguay	9	Víctor Pecci	24 March 1980
Peru	18	Jaime Yzaga	30 October 1989
Philippines	72	Cecil Mamiit	11 October 1999
Poland	6	Hubert Hurkacz	5 August 2024
Portugal	28	João Sousa	16 May 2016
Puerto Rico	120	Miguel Nido	23 April 1990
Qatar	950	Sultan Al-Alawi	11 September 2000
Romania	1	Ilie Năstase	23 August 1973
Russia	1	Yevgeny Kafelnikov; Marat Safin; Daniil Medvedev	3 May 1999; 20 November 2000; 28 February 2022
Rwanda	1422	Eric Hagenimana	11 October 2004
San Marino	1101	Marco De Rossi	26 September 2022
Saudi Arabia	1040	Ammar Al-Haqbani	13 July 2026
Senegal	74	Yahiya Doumbia	19 September 1988
Serbia	1	Novak Djokovic*	4 July 2011
Serbia and Montenegro	63	Novak Djokovic*	29 May 2006
Sierra Leone	1194	Sahr Timothy Kpulun	26 September 2011
Singapore	655	Wei Pin Choo	30 November 1992
Slovakia	6	Karol Kučera	14 September 1998
Slovenia	43	Grega Žemlja; Aljaž Bedene	15 July 2013; 19 February 2018
Solomon Islands	956	Michael Leong	22 June 2009
South Africa	5	Kevin Curren; Kevin Anderson	22 July 1985; 16 July 2018
South Korea	19	Chung Hyeon	2 April 2018
Soviet Union	9	Alex Metreveli	3 July 1974
Spain	1	Carlos Moyá; Juan Carlos Ferrero; Rafael Nadal; Carlos Alcaraz	15 March 1999; 8 September 2003; 18 August 2008; 12 September 2022
Sri Lanka	292	Sivagnanam Suresh	4 January 1981
Sudan	1488	Gaafar El Sadig; Mohammed Youssif	6 February 2006; 6 February 2006
Sweden	1	Björn Borg; Mats Wilander; Stefan Edberg	23 August 1977; 12 September 1988; 13 August 1990
Switzerland	1	Roger Federer	2 February 2004
Syria	299	Hazem Naw	28 October 2024
Tajikistan	1393	Dilshod Sharifi	9 July 2012
Tanzania	1024	Ronald Rugimbana	14 July 2003
Thailand	9	Paradorn Srichaphan	12 May 2003
Togo	316	Komlavi Loglo	1 October 2007
Trinidad and Tobago	969	Joseph Cadogan	12 September 2011
Tunisia	42	Malek Jaziri	12 November 2018
Turkey	77	Marsel İlhan	2 March 2015
Turkmenistan	1115	Isa Mämmetgulyýew	25 July 2016
Uganda	509	Patrick Tibbs	4 January 1982
Ukraine	4	Andriy Medvedev	16 May 1994
United Arab Emirates	805	Omar Alawadhi	14 July 2003
United Kingdom	1	Andy Murray	7 November 2016
United States	1	Jimmy Connors; John McEnroe; Jim Courier; Pete Sampras; Andre Agassi; Andy Roddick	29 July 1974; 3 March 1980; 10 February 1992; 12 April 1993; 10 April 1995; 3 November 2003
United States Virgin Islands	1038	Larry Angus	18 June 1990
Uruguay	19	Pablo Cuevas	15 August 2016
Uzbekistan	33	Denis Istomin	13 August 2012
Venezuela	66	Jorge Andrew	31 December 1978
Vietnam	231	Lý Hoàng Nam	28 November 2022
Yugoslavia	7	Goran Ivanišević*	28 January 1991
Zambia	913	Dermot Sweeney	30 November 1992
Zimbabwe	22	Byron Black	29 April 1996

* Goran Ivanišević is included for both Yugoslavia and Croatia, and Novak Djokovic is included for both Serbia and Montenegro, and Serbia.

=== Women ===
Nation	Ranking	Player(s)	Date reached
Albania	1061	Daniela Islamaj	21 June 2010
Algeria	370	Samia Medjahdi	7 August 2006
Andorra	89	Victoria Jiménez Kasintseva	16 March 2026
Angola	373	Helga Vieira	16 July 2001
Argentina	3	Gabriela Sabatini	27 February 1989
Armenia	36	Elina Avanesyan	17 March 2025
Australia	1	Evonne Goolagong Cawley; Ashleigh Barty	26 April 1976; 24 June 2019
Austria	7	Barbara Schett	13 September 1999
Azerbaijan	1141	Kamilla Farhad	7 November 2011
Bahamas	916	Kerrie Cartwright	11 June 2018
Belarus	1	Victoria Azarenka; Aryna Sabalenka	30 January 2012; 11 September 2023
Belgium	1	Kim Clijsters; Justine Henin	11 August 2003; 20 October 2003
Benin	974	Gloriana Goreti Nahum	21 July 2025
Bolivia	187	María Fernanda Álvarez Terán	28 September 2009
Bosnia and Herzegovina	99	Mervana Jugić-Salkić	21 June 2004
Brazil	10	Beatriz Haddad Maia	12 June 2023
Bulgaria	3	Manuela Maleeva	4 February 1985
Burundi	212	Sada Nahimana	16 March 2026
Cambodia	560	Andrea Ka	12 June 2017
Cameroon	989	Karine Marion Job	23 February 2026
Canada	4	Bianca Andreescu	21 October 2019
Chile	162	Daniela Seguel	28 July 2018
China	2	Li Na	17 February 2014
Chinese Taipei	23	Hsieh Su-wei	25 February 2013
Colombia	16	Fabiola Zuluaga	17 January 2005
Costa Rica	624	Paula Umaña	7 November 1994
Croatia	4	Iva Majoli	5 February 1996
Cuba	391	Iluminada Concepción	17 July 1989
Cyprus	152	Raluca Șerban	24 July 2023
Czech Republic	1	Karolína Plíšková	17 July 2017
Czechoslovakia	3	Hana Mandlíková	16 April 1984
Denmark	1	Caroline Wozniacki	11 October 2010
Dominican Republic	219	Joelle Schad	21 October 1996
Ecuador	287	María Dolores Campana	27 February 1995
Egypt	31	Mayar Sherif	19 June 2023
El Salvador	772	Ingrid Gonzalez	18 October 1993
Estonia	2	Anett Kontaveit	6 June 2022
Fiji	1199	Saoirse Breen	15 September 2025
Finland	50	Emma Laine	7 August 2006
France	1	Amélie Mauresmo	13 September 2004
Gabon	1094	Celestine Avomo Ella	26 August 2019
Georgia	18 (Note: Although Meskhi has a career high singles ranking of 12 in August 1991, she was playing under Soviet flag at that time. Sport organizations did not recognized Georgia as an independent state until after 1992 Summer Olympics (August 1992).)	Leila Meskhi	31 August 1992
Germany	1	Steffi Graf; Angelique Kerber	17 August 1984; 12 September 2016
Greece	3	Maria Sakkari	21 March 2022
Guadeloupe	1096	Anne Sophie Morandais	2 December 2019
Guatemala	608 (Note: Jessica Lehnhoff, who has a career high singles ranking of 166 in June 2004, has played for Guatemala Fed Cup team, but played under United States flag in WTA Tour.)	Kirsten-Andrea Weedon	5 August 2019
Haiti	397	Neyssa Etienne	14 June 2004
Hong Kong	58 (Note: Although Hy has a career high singles ranking of 28 in March 1993, she switched nationalities to represent Canada starting at the beginning of the 1988 season.)	Patricia Hy	13 April 1987
Hungary	7	Andrea Temesvári	23 January 1984
India	27	Sania Mirza	27 August 2007
Indonesia	19	Yayuk Basuki	6 October 1997
Iran	914 (Note: Aravane Rezaï, who has double Iranian and French nationality, has a career high singles ranking of 15 in October 2010, but has always played under the French flag in WTA Tour.)	Mandegar Farzami	20 July 2026
Ireland	181 (Note: Anne Mall, who has a career high singles ranking of 139 in August 1994, has played for Ireland Fed Cup team, but played under United States flag in WTA Tour.)	Kelly Liggan	15 September 2003
Israel	11	Shahar Pe'er	31 January 2011
Italy	4	Francesca Schiavone; Jasmine Paolini	31 January 2011; 28 October 2024
Jamaica	347	Iwalani McCalla	21 August 1995
Japan	1	Naomi Osaka	28 January 2019
Kazakhstan	1	Elena Rybakina	14 September 2026
Kenya	414	Angella Okutoyi	19 January 2026
Kosovo	352	Arlinda Rushiti	9 January 2023
Kyrgyzstan	163	Ksenia Palkina Ulukan	16 March 2009
Latvia	5	Jeļena Ostapenko	19 March 2018
Liechtenstein	137	Stephanie Vogt	24 February 2014
Lithuania	197	Lina Stančiūtė	28 September 2009
Luxembourg	18	Anne Kremer	29 July 2002
Madagascar	44	Dally Randriantefy	11 April 2005
Malaysia	329	Khoo Chin-bee	15 September 2003
Malta	235	Francesca Curmi	20 July 2026
Mauritius	233	Marinne Giraud	9 February 2009
Mexico	34	Angélica Gavaldón	1 January 1996
Moldova	132 (Note: Aliona Bolsova, who has double Spanish and Moldovan nationality, has a career high singles ranking of 88 in July 2019, but she switched nationalities to represent Spain starting in April 2013.)	Svetlana Komleva	13 March 1995
Monaco	87 (Note: Although Gagliardi has a career high singles ranking of 42 in 2002, she switched nationalities to represent Switzerland starting in July 1997.)	Emmanuelle Gagliardi	8 June 1997
Montenegro	46	Danka Kovinić	22 February 2016
Morocco	139	Bahia Mouhtassine	24 June 2002
Namibia	473 (Note: Although Nortje has a career high singles ranking of 447 in 1989, she did not represent Namibia until it became an independent country in 21 March 1990.)	Elizma Nortje	25 March 1990
Nepal	1358	Abhilasha Bista	27 May 2024
Netherlands	4	Kiki Bertens	13 May 2019
New Caledonia	867	Carolann Delaunay	28 October 2024
New Zealand	17	Belinda Cordwell	4 December 1989
Nigeria	549	Clara Udofa	10 November 1997
North Macedonia	170	Lina Gjorcheska	12 June 2017
Norway	174	Amy Jönsson	4 July 1988
Oman	362	Fatma Al-Nabhani	4 October 2010
Pakistan	943	Ushna Suhail	12 December 2016
Papua New Guinea	276	Abigail Tere-Apisah	6 August 2018
Paraguay	51	Rossana de los Ríos	12 November 2001
Peru	14	Laura Arraya	4 March 1990
Philippines	18	Alexandra Eala	24 August 2026
Poland	1	Iga Świątek	4 April 2022
Portugal	76	Michelle Larcher de Brito	6 July 2009
Puerto Rico	27	Kristina Brandi; Monica Puig	4 December 2000; 26 September 2016
Romania	1	Simona Halep	9 October 2017
Russia	1	Maria Sharapova; Dinara Safina	22 August 2005; 20 April 2009
Samoa	662	Steffi Carruthers	13 October 2014
San Marino	448	Francesca Guardigli	4 August 1997
Serbia	1	Ana Ivanovic; Jelena Janković	9 June 2008; 11 August 2008
Serbia and Montenegro	9	Jelena Dokic	17 February 2003
Singapore	438 (Note: Beier Ko, who has a career high singles ranking of 299 in June 2004, has played for Singapore Fed Cup team, but played under the Canadian flag in WTA Tour.)	Stefanie Tan	15 May 2017
Slovakia	4	Dominika Cibulková	20 March 2017
Slovenia	20	Katarina Srebotnik	7 August 2006
South Africa	3	Amanda Coetzer	3 November 1997
South Korea	45	Cho Yoon-jeong	14 July 2003
Soviet Union	5	Natalya Zvereva	22 May 1989
Spain	1	Arantxa Sánchez Vicario; Garbiñe Muguruza	6 February 1995; 11 September 2017
Sri Lanka	268	Lihini Weerasuriya	15 February 1993
Sweden	10	Catarina Lindqvist	15 April 1985
Switzerland	1	Martina Hingis	31 March 1997
Thailand	19	Tamarine Tanasugarn	13 May 2002
Trinidad and Tobago	905	Yolande Leacock	18 April 2011
Tunisia	2	Ons Jabeur	27 June 2022
Turkey	48	Zeynep Sönmez	13 July 2026
Turkmenistan	536	Anastasiya Prenko	3 May 2010
Ukraine	3	Elina Svitolina	11 September 2017
United Kingdom	2	Virginia Wade	3 November 1975
United States	1	Chris Evert; Martina Navratilova; Tracy Austin; Monica Seles*; Lindsay Davenport; Jennifer Capriati; Venus Williams; Serena Williams	3 November 1975; 10 July 1978; 7 April 1980; 15 August 1995; 12 October 1998; 15 October 2001; 25 February 2002; 8 July 2002
Uruguay	218 (Note: Fiorella Bonicelli, who played between 1967 and 1978, ranked in the top 40, but data from that time are too sparse to estimate her highest career ranking. She certainly ranked 33 in December 1978.)	Patricia Miller	30 January 1989
Uzbekistan	16	Iroda Tulyaganova	17 June 2002
Venezuela	26	María Vento-Kabchi	19 July 2004
Vietnam	612	Nguyen Thuy-Dung	25 May 2009
Yugoslavia	1	Monica Seles*	11 March 1991
Zimbabwe	31	Cara Black	15 March 1999

* Monica Seles is included for both United States and Yugoslavia.

== Best result by country in an Open Era Grand Slam – singles ==
=== Men ===
Nation	Grand Slams Won	Player(s)
USA	51	Pete Sampras (14), Jimmy Connors (8), Andre Agassi (8), John McEnroe (7), Jim Courier (4), Arthur Ashe (3), Stan Smith (2), Roscoe Tanner, Vitas Gerulaitis, Johan Kriek, Michael Chang, Andy Roddick
Spain	36	Rafael Nadal (22), Carlos Alcaraz (7), Sergi Bruguera (2), Andrés Gimeno, Manuel Orantes, Carlos Moyá, Albert Costa, Juan Carlos Ferrero

==== Oceania ====
- Australia: Champion (x20)
  - Rod Laver
    - 1968 Wimbledon, 1969 Australian Open, 1969 French Open, 1969 Wimbledon, 1969 US Open
  - John Newcombe
    - 1970 Wimbledon, 1971 Wimbledon, 1973 Australian Open, 1973 US Open, 1975 Australian Open
  - Ken Rosewall
    - 1968 French Open, 1970 US Open, 1971 Australian Open, 1972 Australian Open
  - Patrick Rafter
    - 1997 US Open, 1998 US Open
  - Lleyton Hewitt
    - 2001 US Open, 2002 Wimbledon
  - Mark Edmondson
    - 1976 Australian Open
  - Pat Cash
    - 1987 Wimbledon
- New Zealand: Finalist (x2)
  - Onny Parun
    - 1973 Australian Open
  - Chris Lewis
    - 1983 Wimbledon

==== North America ====
- Bahamas: Third Round
  - Roger Smith
    - 1994 US Open
- Barbados: First Round
  - Darian King
    - 2017 US Open
- Canada: Finalist
  - Milos Raonic
    - 2016 Wimbledon
- Costa Rica: First Round (x17)
  - Juan Antonio Marín
    - 1998, 1999, 2000, 2006 Australian Open, 1998, 1999, 2000, 2001, 2006 French Open, 1997, 1998, 1999, 2000 Wimbledon, 1997, 1998, 1999, 2000 US Open
- Cuba: First Round
  - Mario Tabares
    - 1990 French Open
- Dominican Republic: Third Round
  - Víctor Estrella Burgos
    - 2014 US Open
- El Salvador
- Guatemala
- Haiti: Fourth Round
  - Ronald Agénor
    - 1988 US Open
- Jamaica: Third Round (x2)
  - Dustin Brown
    - 2013 Wimbledon, 2015 Wimbledon
- Mexico: Semifinalist (x3)
  - Raúl Ramírez
    - 1976 French Open, 1976 Wimbledon, 1977 French Open
- United States: Champion (x51)
  - Pete Sampras
    - 1990 US Open, 1993 Wimbledon, 1993 US Open, 1994 Australian Open, 1994 Wimbledon, 1995 Wimbledon, 1995 US Open, 1996 US Open, 1997 Australian Open, 1997 Wimbledon, 1998 Wimbledon, 1999 Wimbledon, 2000 Wimbledon, 2002 US Open
  - Jimmy Connors
    - 1974 Australian Open, 1974 Wimbledon, 1974 US Open, 1976 US Open, 1978 US Open, 1982 Wimbledon, 1982 US Open, 1983 US Open
  - Andre Agassi
    - 1992 Wimbledon, 1994 US Open, 1995 Australian Open, 1999 French Open, 1999 US Open, 2000 Australian Open, 2001 Australian Open, 2003 Australian Open
  - John McEnroe
    - 1979 US Open, 1980 US Open, 1981 Wimbledon, 1981 US Open, 1983 Wimbledon, 1984 Wimbledon, 1984 US Open
  - Jim Courier
    - 1991 French Open, 1992 Australian Open, 1992 French Open, 1993 Australian Open
  - Arthur Ashe
    - US Open, 1970 Australian Open, 1975 Wimbledon
  - Stan Smith
    - 1971 US Open, 1972 Wimbledon
  - Roscoe Tanner
    - 1977 Australian Open (January)
  - Vitas Gerulaitis
    - 1977 Australian Open (December)
  - Johan Kriek
    - 1982 Australian Open
  - Michael Chang
    - 1989 French Open
  - Andy Roddick
    - 2003 US Open

==== South America ====
- Argentina: Champion (x6)
  - Guillermo Vilas
    - 1977 French Open, 1977 US Open, 1978 Australian Open, 1979 Australian Open
  - Gastón Gaudio
    - 2004 French Open
  - Juan Martin del Potro
    - 2009 US Open
- Bolivia: Third Round
  - Mario Martinez
    - 1983 French Open
- Brazil: Champion (x3)
  - Gustavo Kuerten
    - 1997 French Open, 2000 French Open, 2001 French Open
- Chile: Finalist
  - Marcelo Ríos
    - 1998 Australian Open
  - Fernando González
    - 2007 Australian Open
- Colombia: Fourth Round
  - Daniel Elahi Galán
    - 2023 Wimbledon
- Ecuador: Champion
  - Andrés Gómez
    - 1990 French Open
- Paraguay: Finalist
  - Víctor Pecci
    - 1979 French Open
- Peru: Quarterfinalist (x2)
  - Jaime Yzaga
    - 1991 Australian Open, 1994 US Open
- Uruguay: Quarterfinalist
  - Marcelo Filippini
    - 1999 French Open
- Venezuela: Third Round
  - Nicolás Pereira
    - 1995 US Open

==== Africa ====
- Algeria: First Round
  - Lamine Ouahab
    - 2009 Australian Open
- Egypt: Quarterfinalist
  - Ismail El Shafei
    - 1974 Wimbledon
- Kenya: Second Round
  - Paul Wekesa
    - 1989 Australian Open
- Morocco: Quarterfinalist (x4)
  - Younes El Aynaoui
    - 2000 Australian Open, 2002 US Open, 2003 Australian Open, 2003 US Open
- Nigeria: Fourth Round
  - Nduka Odizor
    - 1983 Wimbledon
- Senegal: First Round (x4)
  - Yahiya Doumbia
    - 1988 French Open, 1988 Wimbledon, 1988 US Open, 1989 US Open
- South Africa: Champion
  - Johan Kriek
    - 1981 Australian Open
- Tunisia: Third Round (x2)
  - Malek Jaziri
    - 2015 Australian Open, 2017 Australian Open
- Zimbabwe: Quarterfinalist (x2)
  - Byron Black
    - 1995 US Open, 2000 Wimbledon

==== Asia ====
- Armenia: Fourth Round (x2)
  - Sargis Sargsian
    - 2003 Australian Open, 2004 US Open
- China: Third Round (x4)
  - Wu Yibing
    - 2022 US Open
  - Zhang Zhizhen
    - 2023 French Open, 2023 US Open, 2024 French Open
- Chinese Taipei: Quarterfinalist
  - Lu Yen-hsun
    - 2010 Wimbledon
- Georgia: Finalist
  - Alex Metreveli
    - 1973 Wimbledon
- Hong Kong: Third Round
  - Coleman Wong
    - 2025 US Open
- India: Quarterfinalist (x4)
  - Vijay Amitraj
    - 1973 Wimbledon, 1973 US Open, 1974 US Open, 1981 Wimbledon
- Indonesia
- Iran: Second Round
  - Mansour Bahrami
    - 1981 French Open
- Israel: Quarterfinalist
  - Amos Mansdorf
    - 1992 Australian Open
- Japan: Finalist
  - Kei Nishikori
    - 2014 US Open
- Kazakhstan: Quarterfinalist
  - Alexander Bublik
    - 2025 French Open
- Lebanon: Second Round
  - Hady Habib
    - 2025 Australian Open
- Pakistan: Third Round
  - Haroon Rahim
    - 1971 US Open
- Philippines: Second Round (x5)
  - Cecil Mamiit
    - 1999 Australian Open, 1999 US Open, 2001 Australian Open, 2001 French Open, 2002 French Open
- South Korea: Semifinalist
  - Hyeon Chung
    - 2018 Australian Open
- Thailand: Fourth Round (x3)
  - Paradorn Srichaphan
    - 2003 Wimbledon, 2003 US Open, 2004 Australian Open
- Turkey: Second Round (x7)
  - Marsel İlhan
    - 2009 US Open, 2010 Australian Open, 2010 Wimbledon, 2011 French Open, 2011 US Open, 2015 Wimbledon, 2015 US Open
- Uzbekistan: Fourth Round (x3)
  - Denis Istomin
    - 2012 US Open, 2013 Wimbledon, 2017 Australian Open
- Vietnam

==== Europe ====
- Austria: Champion (x2)
  - Thomas Muster
    - 1995 French Open
  - Dominic Thiem
    - 2020 US Open
- Belarus: Quarterfinalist
  - Max Mirnyi
    - 2002 US Open
- Belgium: Semifinalist
  - Xavier Malisse
    - 2002 Wimbledon
- Bosnia and Herzegovina: Third Round (x6)
  - Damir Džumhur
    - 2014 Australian Open, 2015 French Open, 2017 US Open, 2018 Australian Open, 2018 French Open, 2025 French Open
- Bulgaria: Semifinalist (x3)
  - Grigor Dimitrov
    - 2014 Wimbledon, 2017 Australian Open, 2019 US Open
- Croatia: Champion (x2)
  - Goran Ivanišević
    - 2001 Wimbledon
  - Marin Čilić
    - 2014 US Open
- Cyprus: Finalist
  - Marcos Baghdatis
    - 2006 Australian Open
- Czech Republic: Champion (x12)
  - Ivan Lendl
    - 1984 French Open, 1985 US Open, 1986 French Open, 1986 US Open, 1987 French Open, 1987 US Open, 1989 Australian Open, 1990 Australian Open
  - Jan Kodeš
    - 1970 French Open, 1971 French Open, 1973 Wimbledon
  - Petr Korda
    - 1998 Australian Open
- Denmark: Quarterfinalist (x3)
  - Holger Rune
    - 2022 French Open, 2023 French Open, 2023 Wimbledon
- Estonia: Third Round
  - Jürgen Zopp
    - 2018 French Open
- Finland: Quarterfinalist (x3)
  - Jarkko Nieminen
    - 2005 US Open, 2006 Wimbledon, 2008 Australian Open
- France: Champion
  - Yannick Noah
    - 1983 French Open
- Germany: Champion (x8)
  - Boris Becker
    - 1985 Wimbledon, 1986 Wimbledon, 1989 Wimbledon, 1989 US Open, 1991 Australian Open, 1996 Australian Open
  - Michael Stich
    - 1991 Wimbledon
  - Alexander Zverev
    - 2026 French Open
- Greece: Finalist (x2)
  - Stefanos Tsitsipas
    - 2021 French Open, 2023 Australian Open
- Hungary: Quarterfinalist (x2)
  - Balázs Taróczy
    - 1976 French Open, 1981 French Open
- Iceland
- Ireland: Fourth Round
  - Matt Doyle
    - 1982 US Open
- Italy: Champion (x6)
  - Adriano Panatta
    - 1976 French Open
  - Jannik Sinner
    - 2024 Australian Open, 2024 US Open, 2025 Australian Open, 2025 Wimbledon, 2026 Wimbledon
- Latvia: Semifinalist
  - Ernests Gulbis
    - 2014 French Open
- Lithuania: Third Round (x4)
  - Ričardas Berankis
    - 2011 Australian Open, 2013 Australian Open, 2020 US Open, 2021 French Open
- Luxembourg: Quarterfinalist (x2)
  - Gilles Müller
    - 2008 US Open, 2017 Wimbledon
- Moldova: Third Round (x4)
  - Radu Albot
    - 2017 US Open, 2018 Wimbledon, 2021 Australian Open, 2022 Australian Open
- Monaco: Third Round (x2)
  - Jean-René Lisnard
    - 2005 Australian Open
  - Valentin Vacherot
    - 2026 Australian Open
- Montenegro
- Netherlands: Champion
  - Richard Krajicek
    - 1996 Wimbledon
- North Macedonia
- Norway: Finalist (x3)
  - Casper Ruud
    - 2022 French Open, 2022 US Open, 2023 French Open
- Poland: Semifinalist
  - Jerzy Janowicz
    - 2013 Wimbledon
  - Hubert Hurkacz
    - 2021 Wimbledon
- Portugal: Fourth Round (x4)
  - João Sousa
    - 2018 US Open, 2019 Wimbledon
  - Nuno Borges
    - 2024 Australian Open, 2024 US Open
- Romania: Champion (x2)
  - Ilie Năstase
    - 1972 US Open, 1973 French Open
- Russia: Champion (x5)
  - Yevgeny Kafelnikov
    - 1996 French Open, 1999 Australian Open
  - Marat Safin
    - 2000 US Open, 2005 Australian Open
  - Daniil Medvedev
    - 2021 US Open
- Serbia: Champion (x24)
  - Novak Djokovic
    - 2008 Australian Open, 2011 Australian Open, 2011 Wimbledon, 2011 US Open, 2012 Australian Open, 2013 Australian Open, 2014 Wimbledon, 2015 Australian Open, 2015 Wimbledon, 2015 US Open, 2016 Australian Open, 2016 French Open, 2018 Wimbledon, 2018 US Open, 2019 Australian Open, 2019 Wimbledon, 2020 Australian Open, 2021 Australian Open, 2021 French Open, 2021 Wimbledon, 2022 Wimbledon, 2023 Australian Open, 2023 French Open, 2023 US Open
- Slovakia: Finalist (x2)
  - Miloslav Mečíř
    - 1986 US Open, 1989 Australian Open
- Slovenia: Third Round (x6)
  - Aljaž Bedene
    - 2016 French Open, 2017 Wimbledon, 2019 US Open, 2020 French Open, 2021 Wimbledon, 2022 French Open
- Spain: Champion (x36)
  - Rafael Nadal
    - 2005 French Open, 2006 French Open, 2007 French Open, 2008 French Open, 2008 Wimbledon, 2009 Australian Open, 2010 French Open, 2010 Wimbledon, 2010 US Open, 2011 French Open, 2012 French Open, 2013 French Open, 2013 US Open, 2014 French Open, 2017 French Open, 2017 US Open, 2018 French Open, 2019 French Open, 2019 US Open, 2020 French Open, 2022 Australian Open, 2022 French Open
  - Carlos Alcaraz
    - 2022 US Open, 2023 Wimbledon, 2024 French Open, 2024 Wimbledon, 2025 French Open, 2025 US Open, 2026 Australian Open
  - Sergi Bruguera
    - 1993 French Open, 1994 French Open
  - Andrés Gimeno
    - 1972 French Open
  - Manuel Orantes
    - 1975 US Open
  - Carlos Moyá
    - 1998 French Open
  - Albert Costa
    - 2002 French Open
  - Juan Carlos Ferrero
    - 2003 French Open
- Sweden: Champion (x25)
  - Björn Borg
    - 1974 French Open, 1975 French Open, 1976 Wimbledon, 1977 Wimbledon, 1978 French Open, 1978 Wimbledon, 1979 French Open, 1979 Wimbledon, 1980 French Open, 1980 Wimbledon, 1981 French Open
  - Mats Wilander
    - 1982 French Open, 1983 Australian Open, 1984 Australian Open, 1985 French Open, 1988 Australian Open, 1988 French Open, 1988 US Open
  - Stefan Edberg
    - 1985 Australian Open, 1987 Australian Open, 1988 Wimbledon, 1990 Wimbledon, 1991 US Open, 1992 US Open
  - Thomas Johansson
    - 2002 Australian Open
- Switzerland: Champion (x23)
  - Roger Federer
    - 2003 Wimbledon, 2004 Australian Open, 2004 Wimbledon, 2004 US Open, 2005 Wimbledon, 2005 US Open, 2006 Australian Open, 2006 Wimbledon, 2006 US Open, 2007 Australian Open, 2007 Wimbledon, 2007 US Open, 2008 US Open, 2009 French Open, 2009 Wimbledon, 2010 Australian Open, 2012 Wimbledon, 2017 Australian Open, 2017 Wimbledon, 2018 Australian Open
  - Stan Wawrinka
    - 2014 Australian Open, 2015 French Open, 2016 US Open
- Ukraine: Finalist
  - Andriy Medvedev
    - 1999 French Open
- United Kingdom: Champion (x3)
  - Andy Murray
    - 2012 US Open, 2013 Wimbledon, 2016 Wimbledon

=== Women ===
==== Oceania ====
- Australia: Champion (x24)
  - Margaret Court
    - 1969 Australian Open, 1969 French Open, 1969 US Open, 1970 Australian Open, 1970 French Open, 1970 Wimbledon, 1970 US Open, 1971 Australian Open, 1973 Australian Open, 1973 French Open, 1973 US Open
  - Evonne Goolagong
    - 1971 French Open, 1971 Wimbledon, 1974 Australian Open, 1975 Australian Open, 1976 Australian Open, 1977 Australian Open (December), 1980 Wimbledon
  - Kerry Melville
    - 1977 Australian Open (January)
  - Chris O'Neil (tennis)
    - 1978 Australian Open
  - Samantha Stosur
    - 2011 US Open
  - Ashleigh Barty
    - 2019 French Open, 2021 Wimbledon, 2022 Australian Open
- New Zealand: Semifinalist
  - Belinda Cordwell
    - 1989 Australian Open

==== North America ====
- Canada: Champion
  - Bianca Andreescu
    - 2019 US Open
- Mexico: Quarterfinalist (x2)
  - Angélica Gavaldón
    - 1990 Australian Open, 1995 Australian Open
- Puerto Rico: Fourth Round (x3)
  - Kristina Brandi
    - 2000 Australian Open, 2000 Wimbledon
  - Monica Puig
    - 2013 Wimbledon
- United States: Champion (x90)
  - Billie Jean King
    - 1968 Wimbledon, 1971 US Open, 1972 French Open, 1972 Wimbledon, 1972 US Open, 2002 Wimbledon, 1974 US Open, 2002 Wimbledon
  - Nancy Richey
    - 1968 French Open
  - Chris Evert
    - 1974 French Open, 1974 Wimbledon, 1975 French Open, 1975 US Open, 1976 Wimbledon, 1976 US Open, 1977 US Open, 1978 US Open, 1979 French Open, 1980 French Open, 1980 US Open, 1981 Wimbledon, 1982 Australian Open, 1982 US Open, 1983 French Open, 1984 Australian Open, 1985 French Open, 1986 French Open
  - Martina Navratilova
    - 1978 Wimbledon, 1979 Wimbledon, 1981 Australian Open, 1982 French Open, 1982 Wimbledon, 1983 Australian Open, 1983 Wimbledon, 1983 US Open, 1984 French Open, 1984 Wimbledon, 1984 US Open, 1985 Australian Open, 1985 Wimbledon, 1986 Wimbledon, 1986 US Open, 1987 Wimbledon, 1987 US Open, 1990 Wimbledon
  - Tracy Austin
    - 1979 US Open, 1981 US Open
  - Barbara Jordan (tennis)
    - 1979 Australian Open
  - Monica Seles
    - 1996 Australian Open
  - Lindsay Davenport
    - 1998 US Open, 1999 Wimbledon, 2000 Australian Open
  - Venus Williams
    - 2000 Wimbledon, 2000 US Open, 2001 Wimbledon, 2001 US Open, 2005 Wimbledon, 2007 Wimbledon, 2008 Wimbledon
  - Serena Williams
    - 1999 US Open, 2002 French Open, 2002 Wimbledon, 2002 US Open, 2003 Australian Open, 2003 Wimbledon, 2005 Australian Open, 2007 Australian Open, 2008 US Open, 2009 Australian Open, 2009 Wimbledon, 2010 Australian Open, 2010 Wimbledon, 2012 Wimbledon, 2012 US Open, 2013 French Open, 2013 US Open, 2014 US Open, 2015 Australian Open, 2015 French Open, 2015 Wimbledon, 2016 Wimbledon, 2017 Australian Open
  - Jennifer Capriati
    - 2001 Australian Open, 2001 French Open, 2003 Australian Open
  - Sloane Stephens
    - 2017 US Open
  - Sofia Kenin
    - 2020 Australian Open
  - Coco Gauff
    - 2023 US Open, 2025 French Open
  - Madison Keys
    - 2025 Australian Open

==== South America ====
- Argentina: Champion
  - Gabriela Sabatini
    - 1990 US Open
- Brazil: Semifinalist
  - Beatriz Haddad Maia
    - 2023 French Open
- Colombia: Semifinalist
  - Fabiola Zuluaga
    - 2004 Australian Open
- Paraguay: Fourth Round
  - Rossana de los Ríos
    - 2000 French Open
- Peru: Quarterfinalist
  - Laura Arraya
    - 1991 Wimbledon
- Venezuela: Fourth Round (x2)
  - María Vento-Kabchi
    - 1997 Wimbledon, 2005 US Open

==== Africa ====
- Egypt: Second Round (x5)
  - Mayar Sherif
    - 2021 Australian Open, 2022 French Open, 2023 French Open, 2024 French Open, 2026 French Open
- Madagascar: Third Round (x3)
  - Dally Randriantefy
    - 1995 Australian Open, 1996 US Open, 2003 French Open
- Morocco: First Round (x2)
  - Bahia Mouhtassine
    - 2002 Australian Open, 2003 French Open
- South Africa: Semifinalist (x3)
  - Amanda Coetzer
    - 1996 Australian Open, 1997 Australian Open, 1997 French Open
- Tunisia: Finalist (x3)
  - Ons Jabeur
    - 2022 Wimbledon, 2022 US Open, 2023 Wimbledon
- Zimbabwe: Fourth Round
  - Cara Black
    - 2001 French Open

==== Asia ====
- China: Champion (x2)
  - Li Na
    - 2011 French Open, 2014 Australian Open
- Chinese Taipei: Quarterfinalist
  - Hsieh Su-wei
    - 2021 Australian Open
- Georgia: Quarterfinalist
  - Leila Meskhi
    - 1990 Wimbledon
- India: Fourth Round
  - Sania Mirza
    - 2005 US Open
- Indonesia: Quarterfinalist
  - Yayuk Basuki
    - 1997 Wimbledon
- Iran: Fourth Round (x2)
  - Aravane Rezaï
    - 2006 US Open, 2009 French Open
- Israel: Quarterfinalist (x2)
  - Shahar Pe'er
    - 2007 Australian Open, 2007 US Open
- Japan: Champion (x4)
  - Naomi Osaka
    - 2018 US Open, 2019 Australian Open, 2020 US Open, 2021 Australian Open
- Kazakhstan: Champion
  - Elena Rybakina (x3)
    - 2022 Wimbledon, 2026 Australian Open, 2026 US Open
- Philippines: Fourth Round
  - Alexandra Eala
    - 2026 Wimbledon
- South Korea: Third Round (x2)
  - Cho Yoon-Jeong
    - 2002 US Open, 2005 US Open
- Thailand: Quarterfinalist
  - Tamarine Tanasugarn
    - 2008 Wimbledon
- Turkey: Third Round (x2)
  - Zeynep Sönmez
    - 2025 Wimbledon, 2026 Australian Open
- Uzbekistan: Third Round (x3)
  - Iroda Tulyaganova
    - 2001 Wimbledon, 2002 Australian Open, 2002 French Open

==== Europe ====
- Albania
- Andorra: First Round (x2)
  - Victoria Jiménez Kasintseva
    - 2025 US Open, 2026 Wimbledon
- Austria: Quarterfinalist (x2)
  - Tamira Paszek
    - 2011 Wimbledon, 2012 Wimbledon
- Belarus: Champion (x6)
  - Victoria Azarenka
    - 2012 Australian Open, 2013 Australian Open
  - Aryna Sabalenka
    - 2023 Australian Open, 2024 Australian Open, 2024 US Open, 2025 US Open
- Belgium: Champion (x11)
  - Justine Henin
    - 2003 French Open, 2003 US Open, 2004 Australian Open, 2005 French Open, 2006 French Open, 2007 French Open, 2007 US Open
  - Kim Clijsters
    - 2005 US Open, 2009 US Open, 2010 US Open, 2011 Australian Open
- Bosnia and Herzegovina: First Round (x3)
  - Mervana Jugić-Salkić
    - 2004 French Open, 2004 Wimbledon, 2005 French Open
- Bulgaria: Semifinalist (x2)
  - Manuela Maleeva
    - 1992 US Open, 1993 US Open
- Croatia: Champion
  - Iva Majoli
    - 1997 French Open
- Czech Republic: Champion (x11)
  - Hana Mandlíková
    - 1980 Australian Open, 1981 French Open, 1985 US Open, 1987 Australian Open
  - Jana Novotná
    - 1998 Wimbledon
  - Petra Kvitová
    - 2011 Wimbledon, 2014 Wimbledon
  - Barbora Krejčíková
    - 2021 French Open, 2024 Wimbledon
  - Markéta Vondroušová
    - 2023 Wimbledon
  - Linda Nosková
    - 2026 Wimbledon
- Denmark: Champion
  - Caroline Wozniacki
    - 2018 Australian Open
- Estonia: Quarterfinalist (x7)
  - Kaia Kanepi
    - 2008 French Open, 2010 Wimbledon, 2010 US Open, 2012 French Open, 2013 Wimbledon, 2017 US Open, 2022 Australian Open
- Finland: Second Round (x4)
  - Emma Laine
    - 2005 US Open, 2006 Australian Open, 2006 French Open, 2006 US Open
- France: Champion (x5)
  - Mary Pierce
    - 1995 Australian Open, 2000 French Open
  - Amélie Mauresmo
    - 2006 Australian Open, 2006 Wimbledon
  - Marion Bartoli
    - 2013 Wimbledon
- Germany: Champion (x25)
  - Steffi Graf
    - 1987 French Open, 1988 Australian Open, 1988 French Open, 1988 Wimbledon, 1988 US Open, 1989 Australian Open, 1989 Wimbledon, 1989 US Open, 1990 Australian Open, 1991 Wimbledon, 1992 Wimbledon, 1993 French Open, 1993 Wimbledon, 1993 US Open, 1994 Australian Open, 1995 French Open, 1995 Wimbledon, 1995 US Open, 1996 French Open, 1996 Wimbledon, 1996 US Open, 1999 Wimbledon
  - Angelique Kerber
    - 2016 Australian Open, 2016 US Open, 2018 Wimbledon
- Greece: Semifinalist (x2)
  - Maria Sakkari
    - 2021 French Open, 2021 US Open
- Hungary: Fourth Round (x2)
  - Andrea Temesvári
    - 1983 French Open, 1984 Wimbledon
- Ireland
- Italy: Champion (x2)
  - Francesca Schiavone
    - 2010 French Open
  - Flavia Pennetta
    - 2015 US Open
- Latvia: Champion
  - Jeļena Ostapenko
    - 2017 French Open
- Liechtenstein: First Round
  - Kathinka von Deichmann
    - 2018 US Open
- Lithuania
- Luxembourg: Third Round (x3)
  - Anne Kremer
    - 1999 Wimbledon, 2002 French Open, 2004 Wimbledon
- Malta
- Moldova
- Montenegro: Third Round (x2)
  - Danka Kovinic
    - 2022 Australian Open, 2022 French Open
- Netherlands: Finalist
  - Betty Stöve
    - 1977 Wimbledon
- North Macedonia: First Round
  - Lina Gjorcheska
    - 2026 Wimbledon
- Norway: First Round
  - Amy Jönsson
    - 1988 Australian Open
- Poland: Champion (x6)
  - Iga Świątek
    - 2020 French Open, 2022 French Open, 2022 US Open, 2023 French Open, 2024 French Open, 2025 Wimbledon
- Portugal: Third Round (x3)
  - Michelle Larcher de Brito
    - 2009 French Open, 2013 Wimbledon, 2014 Wimbledon
- Romania: Champion (x3)
  - Virginia Ruzici
    - 1978 French Open
  - Simona Halep
    - 2018 French Open, 2019 Wimbledon
- Russia: Champion (x8)
  - Anastasia Myskina
    - 2004 French Open
  - Maria Sharapova
    - 2004 Wimbledon, 2006 US Open, 2008 Australian Open, 2012 French Open, 2015 French Open
  - Svetlana Kuznetsova
    - 2004 US Open
  - Mirra Andreeva
    - 2026 French Open
- Serbia: Champion
  - Ana Ivanovic
    - 2008 French Open
- Slovakia: Finalist
  - Dominika Cibulková
    - 2014 Australian Open
- Slovenia: Semifinalist
  - Tamara Zidansek
    - 2021 French Open
- Spain: Champion (x7)
  - Arantxa Sánchez Vicario
    - 1989 French Open, 1994 French Open, 1994 US Open, 1998 French Open
  - Conchita Martinez
    - 1994 Wimbledon
  - Garbiñe Muguruza
    - 2016 French Open, 2017 Wimbledon
- Sweden: Semifinalist (x2)
  - Catarina Lindqvist
    - 1987 Australian Open, 1989 Wimbledon
- Switzerland: Champion (x5)
  - Martina Hingis
    - 1997 Australian Open, 1997 Wimbledon, 1997 US Open, 1998 Australian Open, 1999 Australian Open
- Ukraine: Semifinalist (x7)
  - Elina Svitolina
    - 2019 Wimbledon, 2019 US Open, 2023 Wimbledon, 2026 Australian Open
  - Dayana Yastremska
    - 2024 Australian Open
  - Marta Kostyuk
    - 2026 French Open, 2026 Wimbledon
- United Kingdom: Champion (x5)
  - Virginia Wade
    - 1968 US Open, 1972 Australian Open, 1977 Wimbledon
  - Sue Barker
    - 1976 French Open
  - Emma Raducanu
    - 2021 US Open

== Top ranked by country – doubles ==
=== Men ===
Nation	Ranking	Player(s)	Date reached
Algeria	122	Lamine Ouahab	19 November 2007
Antigua and Barbuda	158	Jody Maginley	23 February 2026
Argentina	1	Horacio Zeballos	6 May 2024
Armenia	33	Sargis Sargsian	9 August 2004
Australia	1	Paul McNamee; John Fitzgerald; Todd Woodbridge; Mark Woodforde; Matthew Ebden	25 May 1981; 8 July 1991; 6 July 1992; 16 November 1992; 26 February 2024
Austria	2	Oliver Marach	28 May 2018
Bahamas	1	Mark Knowles	24 June 2002
Belarus	1	Max Mirnyi	9 June 2003
Belgium	10	Dick Norman	26 April 2010
Bolivia	79	Federico Zeballos	18 March 2024
Bosnia and Herzegovina	40	Tomislav Brkić	17 January 2022
Brazil	1	Marcelo Melo	2 November 2015
Bulgaria	66	Grigor Dimitrov	26 August 2013
Burundi	552	Guy Orly Iradukunda	18 April 2022
Canada	1	Grant Connell; Daniel Nestor	15 November 1993; 3 November 2002
Chile	5	Hans Gildemeister	27 April 1987
China	47	Zhang Zhizhen	15 July 2024
Chinese Taipei	60	Ray Ho	16 February 2026
Colombia	1	Juan Sebastián Cabal; Robert Farah	15 July 2019; 15 July 2019
Costa Rica	188	Juan Antonio Marín	12 February 2007
Croatia	1	Mate Pavić; Nikola Mektić	21 May 2018; 18 October 2021
Cyprus	93	Marcos Baghdatis	7 January 2008
Czech Republic	3	Daniel Vacek	8 September 1997
Czechoslovakia	1	Tomáš Šmíd	17 December 1984
Denmark	17	Frederik Nielsen	1 April 2013
Dominican Republic	135	Víctor Estrella Burgos	13 July 2015
Ecuador	1	Andrés Gómez	15 September 1986
Egypt	26	Ismail El Shafei	30 August 1977
El Salvador	1	Marcelo Arévalo	11 November 2024
Estonia	218	Jürgen Zopp	11 July 2016
Finland	1	Henri Kontinen; Harri Heliövaara	3 April 2017; 8 June 2026
France	1	Yannick Noah; Nicolas Mahut	25 August 1986; 6 June 2016
Georgia	100	Irakli Labadze	29 October 2001
Germany	5	Kevin Krawietz	10 February 2025
Ghana	274	Frank Ofori	22 August 1994
Greece	64	Stefanos Tsitsipas	29 August 2022
Hungary	3	Balázs Taróczy	15 July 1985
India	1	Mahesh Bhupathi; Leander Paes; Rohan Bopanna	26 April 1999; 21 June 1999; 29 January 2024
Indonesia	68	Christopher Rungkat	17 June 2019
Israel	5	Andy Ram; Jonathan Erlich	7 July 2008; 7 July 2008
Italy	6	Andrea Vavassori; Simone Bolelli	14 October 2024; 13 January 2025
Ivory Coast	161	Claude N'Goran	15 April 1996
Jamaica	68 (Note: Although Brown has a career high doubles ranking of 43 in May 2012, he switched nationalities to represent Germany starting on 1 November 2010.)	Dustin Brown	18 October 2010
Japan	18	Ben McLachlan	5 November 2018
Jordan	177	Abdullah Shelbayh	2 December 2024
Kazakhstan	21	Andrey Golubev	16 May 2022
Latvia	108	Ģirts Dzelde	4 October 1993
Lebanon	153	Ali Hamadeh	2 August 1999
Lithuania	132	Laurynas Grigelis	12 November 2012
Luxembourg	74	Gilles Müller	1 May 2017
Malaysia	122	Adam Malik	25 July 1994
Mauritius	328	Kamil Patel	28 January 2002
Mexico	1	Raúl Ramírez	12 April 1976
Moldova	56	Radu Albot	29 April 2019
Monaco	12	Hugo Nys	12 June 2023
Montenegro	132 (Note: Although Tošić has a career high doubles ranking of 116 in April 2014, he switched nationalities to represent Serbia starting in May–June 2013.)	Goran Tošić	5 November 2012
Morocco	85	Younes El Aynaoui	14 July 2003
Netherlands	1	Tom Okker; Paul Haarhuis; Jacco Eltingh; Wesley Koolhof	5 February 1979; 31 January 1994; 16 January 1995; 7 November 2022
New Zealand	6	Michael Venus	29 August 2022
North Macedonia	38	Aleksandar Kitinov	15 November 1999
Northern Mariana Islands	200	Colin Sinclair	10 April 2023
Norway	78	Bent-Ove Pedersen	30 August 1993
Pakistan	8	Aisam-ul-Haq Qureshi	6 June 2011
Paraguay	8	Víctor Pecci	3 January 1979
Peru	15	Luis Horna	2 February 2009
Philippines	18	Treat Huey	11 July 2016
Poland	1	Łukasz Kubot	8 January 2018
Portugal	19	Francisco Cabral	12 January 2026
Puerto Rico	66	Ernie Fernández	30 July 1984
Romania	2	Horia Tecău	23 November 2015
Russia	4	Yevgeny Kafelnikov	30 March 1998
Senegal	187	Yahiya Doumbia	6 July 1987
Serbia	1	Nenad Zimonjić	17 November 2008
Serbia and Montenegro	9	Nenad Zimonjić	20 March 2006
Slovakia	7	Filip Polášek	3 February 2020
Slovenia	127	Aljaž Bedene	7 October 2013
South Africa	1	Bob Hewitt; Frew McMillan; Danie Visser; Pieter Aldrich	1 March 1976; 25 April 1977; 29 January 1990; 23 July 1990
South Korea	95	Lee Hyung-taik	16 January 2006
Spain	1	Emilio Sánchez; Marcel Granollers	3 April 1989; 6 May 2024
Sweden	1	Anders Järryd; Stefan Edberg; Jonas Björkman	12 August 1985; 9 June 1986; 9 July 2001
Switzerland	8	Marc Rosset	2 November 1992
Thailand	39	Sanchai Ratiwatana; Sonchat Ratiwatana	28 April 2008; 28 April 2008
Tunisia	54	Skander Mansouri	6 January 2025
Turkey	169	Tuna Altuna	30 April 2018
Ukraine	33	Sergiy Stakhovsky	6 June 2011
United Kingdom	1	Jamie Murray; Joe Salisbury; Neal Skupski; Lloyd Glasspool; Henry Patten	4 April 2016; 4 April 2022; 14 November 2022; 18 August 2025; 8 June 2026
United States	1	John McEnroe; Stan Smith; Peter Fleming; Robert Seguso; Ken Flach; Jim Grabb; Jim Pugh; Rick Leach; David Pate; Kelly Jones; Richey Reneberg; Patrick Galbraith; Jonathan Stark; Jared Palmer; Alex O'Brien; Donald Johnson; Bob Bryan; Mike Bryan; Rajeev Ram; Austin Krajicek	27 April 1981; 2 March 1981; 1 February 1982; 9 September 1985; 14 October 1985; 12 June 1989; 19 June 1989; 26 March 1990; 14 January 1991; 12 October 1992; 1 February 1993; 18 October 1993; 1 August 1994; 20 March 2000; 8 May 2000; 28 January 2002; 8 September 2003; 8 September 2003; 3 October 2022; 12 June 2023
Uruguay	14	Pablo Cuevas	20 April 2009
Uzbekistan	59	Denis Istomin	8 October 2012
Venezuela	44	Nicolás Pereira	19 November 1990
Yugoslavia	1	Slobodan Živojinović	8 September 1986
Zimbabwe	1	Byron Black	14 February 1994

=== Women ===
Nation	Ranking	Player(s)	Date reached
Algeria	166	Inès Ibbou	19 May 2025
Andorra	309	Victoria Jiménez Kasintseva	31 October 2022
Argentina	1	Paola Suárez; Gisela Dulko	9 September 2002; 1 November 2010
Armenia	163	Elina Avanesyan	12 August 2024
Australia	1	Rennae Stubbs; Samantha Stosur; Storm Hunter	21 August 2000; 6 February 2006; 6 November 2023
Austria	8	Barbara Schett	15 January 2001
Belarus	1	Natasha Zvereva; Aryna Sabalenka	7 October 1991; 22 February 2021
Belgium	1	Kim Clijsters; Elise Mertens	4 August 2003; 10 May 2021
Bolivia	137	María Fernanda Álvarez Terán	7 April 2014
Bosnia and Herzegovina	59	Mervana Jugić-Salkić	10 July 2006
Brazil	4	Luisa Stefani	13 July 2026
Bulgaria	13	Magdalena Maleeva	2 February 2004
Burundi	199	Sada Nahimana	27 October 2025
Canada	2	Gabriela Dabrowski	23 February 2026
Chile	11	Alexa Guarachi	11 September 2021
China	1	Peng Shuai	17 February 2014
Chinese Taipei	1	Hsieh Su-wei; Latisha Chan	12 May 2014; 23 October 2017
Colombia	71	Catalina Castaño	8 July 2013
Croatia	9	Darija Jurak Schreiber	15 November 2021
Cyprus	176	Raluca Șerban	14 January 2019
Czech Republic	1	Helena Suková; Jana Novotná; Květa Peschke; Lucie Šafářová; Barbora Krejčíková; Kateřina Siniaková; Barbora Strýcová	1 January 1993; 3 August 1998; 4 July 2011; 21 August 2017; 22 October 2018; 22 October 2018; 15 July 2019
Czechoslovakia	1	Helena Suková; Jana Novotná	5 February 1990; 27 August 1990
Denmark	14	Tine Scheuer-Larsen	10 October 1988
Ecuador	217	Mell Reasco	27 July 2026
Egypt	65	Mayar Sherif	14 April 2025
Estonia	33	Ingrid Neel	6 May 2024
Finland	52	Nanne Dahlman	24 June 1996
France	1	Julie Halard-Decugis; Kristina Mladenovic	11 September 2000; 10 June 2019
Georgia	42	Oksana Kalashnikova	11 September 2023
Germany	3	Steffi Graf; Claudia Kohde-Kilsch	3 March 1987; 17 August 1987
Greece	21	Eleni Daniilidou	29 January 2007
Hong Kong	36	Patricia Hy	30 March 1987
Hungary	1	Tímea Babos	20 August 2018
India	1	Sania Mirza	13 April 2015
Indonesia	9	Yayuk Basuki	6 July 1998
Iran	719 (Note: Aravane Rezaï, who has double Iranian and French nationality, has a career high doubles ranking of 118 in March 2009, but has always played under the French flag in WTA Tour.)	Meshkatolzahra Safi	4 May 2026
Israel	14	Shahar Pe'er	12 May 2008
Italy	1	Flavia Pennetta; Sara Errani; Roberta Vinci	28 February 2011; 10 September 2012; 15 October 2012
Japan	1	Ai Sugiyama	23 October 2000
Kazakhstan	3	Yaroslava Shvedova	23 February 2016
Kenya	223	Angella Okutoyi	19 January 2026
Kosovo	444	Arlinda Rushiti	19 May 2025
Latvia	1	Larisa Neiland	27 January 1992
Liechtenstein	69	Stephanie Vogt	22 February 2016
Lithuania	138	Lina Stančiūtė	15 May 2006
Luxembourg	47	Mandy Minella	29 April 2013
Malta	402	Francesca Curmi	17 July 2023
Mexico	6	Giuliana Olmos	10 April 2023
Montenegro	67	Danka Kovinić	20 June 2016
Morocco	143	Bahia Mouhtassine	4 November 2002
Netherlands	7	Demi Schuurs	22 October 2018
New Zealand	1	Erin Routliffe	15 July 2024
North Macedonia	116	Lina Gjorcheska	12 June 2017
Norway	26	Ulrikke Eikeri	22 April 2024
Peru	27	Laura Arraya	28 March 1988
Philippines	76	Riza Zalameda	12 April 2010
Poland	16	Agnieszka Radwańska	10 October 2011
Portugal	91	Matilde Jorge	9 February 2026
Romania	11	Monica Niculescu	2 April 2018
Russia	1	Anna Kournikova; Ekaterina Makarova; Elena Vesnina	22 November 1999; 11 June 2018; 11 June 2018
Serbia	4	Aleksandra Krunić	18 May 2026
Slovakia	3	Janette Husárová	21 April 2003
Slovenia	1	Katarina Srebotnik	4 July 2011
South Africa	4	Liezel Huber^{1}	4 July 2005
South Korea	34	Park Sung-hee	15 June 1998
Spain	1	Arantxa Sánchez Vicario; Virginia Ruano Pascual	19 October 1992; 8 September 2003
Sweden	20	Johanna Larsson	30 October 2017
Switzerland	1	Martina Hingis	8 June 1998
Thailand	15	Tamarine Tanasugarn	13 September 2004
Tunisia	47	Selima Sfar	28 July 2008
Turkey	53	İpek Şenoğlu	19 October 2009
Ukraine	3	Lyudmyla Kichenok	23 September 2024
United Kingdom	6	Anne Hobbs	17 September 1984
United States	1	Martina Navratilova; Pam Shriver; Gigi Fernández; Lindsay Davenport; Corina Morariu; Lisa Raymond; Liezel Huber; Serena Williams; Venus Williams; Bethanie Mattek-Sands; Coco Gauff; Jessica Pegula; Taylor Townsend	4 September 1984; 18 March 1985; 4 March 1991; 20 October 1997; 3 April 2000; 12 June 2000; 12 November 2007; 7 June 2010; 7 June 2010; 9 January 2017; 15 August 2022; 11 September 2023; 28 July 2025
Uzbekistan	28	Iroda Tulyaganova	23 September 2002
Venezuela	15	María Vento-Kabchi	26 July 2004
Zimbabwe	1	Cara Black	17 October 2005
