= Hamid Reza Naddaf =

Iranian tennis player

Hamid Reza Nadaf
- Country (sports): Iran
- Born: 19 November 1992 (age 33) Isfahan, Iran
- Height: 183 cm (6 ft 0 in)
- Plays: Right-handed (Double-handed backhand)
- Coach: Omid Soori
- Prize money: US $12,676

Singles
- Career record: 3–1
- Career titles: 0
- Highest ranking: No. 803 (14 October 2019)

Doubles
- Career record: 0–0
- Career titles: 0
- Highest ranking: No. 1570 (15 January 2024)
- Last updated on: 3 March 2025.

Hamid Reza Nadaf (born 19 November 1992 in Isfahan) is an Iranian former professional tennis player. He had a career-high ATP singles ranking of world No. 803, achieved on 14 October 2019.

Nadaf played for the Iranian National Team in international competitions.

== Background ==
Hamidreza Nadaf started playing tennis at the age of 7 and at the same time was active in fields such as football and gymnastics. At the age of 12 he pursued the sport of tennis more seriously and finally at the age of 19 he entered the field professionally and was able to He won the national championship and was ranked in the world championships and was invited to the national team at the same age.

From the age of 14, he was a champion in the national championships, and at the age of 16, after his good growth, he was a finalist in the International Youth Championship (ITF), which is held in Iran like all other parts of the world. It reached the world ranking period and rose to the rank of 413 in the world; He also participated in the world adult competitions and when he was 18 years old, he was able to get 4 factors of these competitions and was also in the world ranking of adults. Since then, he has been a regular member of the national team and was sent to various international competitions and was able to prove his place in the national team. He has a record of 7 consecutive games without a loss.

== Honors ==
Tournament name	Holding time	Earned position	Game type
Grand Prize of Freedom	2017-08-03	Champion	Individual
Cup of someone	2016-09-20	Champion	Individual
Cup of someone	2016-09-20	second place	Two people
1000 points (1400 Tehran)	2021-11-19	Champion	Individual
Live Cup in memory of Asghar Kazeruni	2016-08-28	second place	Individual

== Davis Cup ==
Opponent's name	First set	Set II	Third set	Hold time	Opponent nationality
Mohammad abozid	6-1 Nadaf	6-1 Nadaf	-	2021	Iraq
Kenny Bonn	6-4 Bonn	6-1 Nadaf	6-2 Nadaf	2021	Cambodia
Kristanov	6-2 Nadaf	6-0 Nadaf	-	2021	Kyrgyzstan
Mohammad Obaid	6-3 Mohammad Obaid	6-4 Nadaf	7-6 Nadaf	2017	Pakistan
Wuen Huang	5-4 Nadaf	-	-	2017	Vietnam
