= Mohammed Al-Nabhani =

Omani tennis player

- Country (sports): Oman
- Born: 1 September 1985 (age 40) Cairo, Egypt
- Height: 5 ft 10 in (178 cm)
- Plays: Right-handed

Singles
- Career record: 40–31 (Davis Cup)
- Highest ranking: No. 1498 (30 Apr 2007)

Doubles
- Career record: 37–23 (ATP Tour & Davis Cup)
- Highest ranking: No. 1060 (3 Nov 2003)

Mohammed Al-Nabhani (born 1 September 1985) is an Omani former professional tennis player.

== Biography ==
Al-Nabhani was born in 1985 to an Omani father and an Egyptian mother. His two siblings, Fatma and Khalid, are also tennis players. He has formed doubles partnerships with both in international competition, including at the Asian Games, where he competed with sister Fatma in mixed doubles in 2010 and 2018.

Since 2000 he has represented Oman in the Davis Cup, and as of 2019 holds the team records for most ties played (71), most singles wins (40) and most doubles wins (37). His Davis Cup doubles partnership with brother Khalid has amassed 26 wins, which puts them among the top-5 in competition history.

Al-Nabhani had a stint early in his career playing collegiate tennis for the University of Toledo.

On the ATP Tour, Al-Nabhani made a main draw appearance 2011 at the Dubai Tennis Championships, where he and his partner Omar Alawadhi lost their first round match to Marcel Granollers and Dick Norman in a match tiebreak.
