= Ammar Al-Haqbani =

American tennis player

- Country (sports): United States; Saudi Arabia (Davis Cup)
- Born: 15 December 1998 (age 27) Riyadh, Saudi Arabia
- College: Virginia
- Prize money: $9,005

Singles
- Career record: 19–2 (at ATP Tour level, Grand Slam level, and in Davis Cup)
- Career titles: 0
- Highest ranking: No. 1,086 (15 December 2025)
- Current ranking: No. 1,132 (22 December 2025)

Doubles
- Career record: 9–4 (at ATP Tour level, Grand Slam level, and in Davis Cup)
- Career titles: 0
- Highest ranking: No. 1,631 (14 July 2025)
- Current ranking: No. 1,933 (22 December 2025)
- Last updated on: 22 December 2025.

Ammar Al-Haqbani (Arabic: عمار الحقباني; born 15 December 1998) is a Saudi Arabia-born American tennis player. Al-Haqbani has a career high ATP singles ranking of No. 1,080 achieved on 15 December 2025 and a career high ATP doubles ranking of No. 1,631 achieved on 14 July 2025.

Al-Haqbani represents Saudi Arabia at the Davis Cup, where he has a W/L record of 28–6.

Al-Haqbani played college tennis at the University of Virginia.
