= Abdulrahman Al Janahi =

Emirati tennis player

- Country (sports): United Arab Emirates
- Born: 15 November 1994 (age 31)
- Plays: Right-handed

Singles
- Career record: 4–3 (at ATP Tour level, Grand Slam level, and in Davis Cup)
- Career titles: 0

Doubles
- Career record: 8–4 (at ATP Tour level, Grand Slam level, and in Davis Cup)
- Career titles: 0
- Last updated on: 17 February 2020.

Abdulrahman Al Janahi (born 15 November 1994) is an Emirati tennis player. Al Janahi represents the UAE at the Davis Cup, where he has a W/L record of 17–20.

== Career ==
Al Janahi made his ATP main draw debut at the 2020 Dubai Tennis Championships after receiving a wildcard for the doubles main draw.
