= Hamad Abbas Janahi =

Emirati tennis player

- Country (sports): United Arab Emirates
- Born: 4 August 1990 (age 35) Dubai, United Arab Emirates
- Plays: Left-handed
- Prize money: $11,439

Singles
- Career record: 0–0 (at ATP Tour level, Grand Slam level, and in Davis Cup)
- Career titles: 0

Doubles
- Career record: 0–3 (at ATP Tour level, Grand Slam level, and in Davis Cup)
- Career titles: 0
- Last updated on: 28 November 2016.

Hamad Abbas Janahi (born 4 August 1990) is an Emirati tennis player.

Janahi made his ATP main draw debut in the doubles draw at the 2008 Dubai Tennis Championships. Janahi represents the United Arab Emirates in the Davis Cup. He has a 28–25 record at the Davis Cup.
