= Omar Al-Awadhi =

Emirati tennis player (born 1982)

- Country (sports): United Arab Emirates
- Born: 16 January 1982 (age 44) Dubai, United Arab Emirates
- Turned pro: 2001
- Plays: Right-handed (two-handed backhand)
- Prize money: $111,717

Singles
- Career record: 1–10 (at ATP Tour level, Grand Slam level, and in Davis Cup)
- Career titles: 0
- Highest ranking: No. 805 (14 July 2003)

Doubles
- Career record: 0–9 (at ATP Tour level, Grand Slam level, and in Davis Cup)
- Career titles: 0
- Highest ranking: No. 1005 (26 May 2003)
- Last updated on: 6 April 2018.

Omar Bahrouzyan Al-Awadhi (born 16 January 1982) is an Emirati tennis player.

Al-Awadhi has a career high ATP singles ranking of 805 achieved on 14 July 2003. He also has a career high ATP doubles ranking of 1005 achieved on 26 May 2003.

Al-Awadhi made his ATP main draw debut at the 2001 Dubai Tennis Championships in the singles draw. Al-Awadhi represents the United Arab Emirates in the Davis Cup. He received many wildcards at the Dubai Tennis Championships, the last time in 2021, never winning a match.

== ATP Challenger and ITF Futures finals ==
=== Doubles: 2 (0–2) ===
ITF Futures (0–2)

| Result | W–L | Date | Tournament | Tier | Surface | Partner | Opponents | Score |
|---|---|---|---|---|---|---|---|---|
| Loss | 0–1 | May 2003 | Meshref, Kuwait | Futures | Hard | (Kuwait) Musaad Al Jazzaf | (Romania) Florin Mergea (Romania) Horia Tecău | 2–6, 5–7 |
| Loss | 0–2 | Oct 2010 | Meshref, Kuwait | Futures | Hard | (Oman) Mohammed Al Nabhani | (Croatia) Roko Karanušić (Germany) Sebastian Rieschick | 2–6, 2–6 |
