= 2015 Davis Cup =

2015 edition of the Davis Cup

Details
- Duration: 6 February – 29 November 2015
- Edition: 104th

Champion
- Winning nation: Great Britain

The 2015 Davis Cup was the 104th edition of the Davis Cup, a tournament between national teams in men's tennis. It was sponsored by BNP Paribas. Great Britain won their tenth title (their first since 1936), with Andy Murray defeating David Goffin of Belgium on clay in the final match held at Flanders Expo located in Ghent on 29 November 2015.

== World Group ==
Participating teams
Argentina	Australia	Belgium	Brazil
Canada	Croatia	Czech Republic	France
Germany	Great Britain	Italy	Japan
Kazakhstan	Serbia	Switzerland	United States

=== Seeds ===
1. France (quarterfinals)
2. Switzerland (first round)
3. Czech Republic (first round)
4. Serbia (quarterfinals)
5. Argentina (semifinals)
6. Italy (first round)
7. United States (first round)
8. Canada (quarterfinals)

=== Draw ===
First round 6–8 March
Frankfurt, Germany (indoor hard)
1	France	3
Germany	2
Glasgow, Great Britain (indoor hard)
7	United States	2
Great Britain	3
Ostrava, Czech Republic (indoor hard)
3	Czech Republic	2
Australia	3
Astana, Kazakhstan (indoor hard)
6	Italy	2
Kazakhstan	3
Buenos Aires, Argentina (clay)
Brazil	2
5	Argentina	3
Kraljevo, Serbia (indoor hard)
Croatia	0
4	Serbia	5
Vancouver, Canada (indoor hard)
Japan	2
8	Canada	3
Liège, Belgium (indoor hard)
Belgium	3
2	Switzerland	2

Quarterfinals; 17–19 July
London, Great Britain (grass)
1	France	1
Great Britain	3
Darwin, Australia (grass)
Australia	3
Kazakhstan	2
Buenos Aires, Argentina (indoor clay)
5	Argentina	4
4	Serbia	1
Middelkerke, Belgium (clay)
8	Canada	0
Belgium	5

Semifinals; 18–20 September
Glasgow, Great Britain (indoor hard)
Great Britain	3
Australia	2
Brussels, Belgium (indoor hard)
5	Argentina	2
Belgium	3

Final; 27–29 November
Ghent, Belgium (indoor clay)
Great Britain	3
Belgium	1

=== Final ===
Belgium and Great Britain won through to the final by winning semi-final ties against Argentina and Australia respectively. This meant that Belgium would participate in their first Davis Cup final since 1904 (a 5–0 defeat against Great Britain), and Great Britain in their first since 1978. It also marked a remarkable recovery in fortunes for Great Britain, who had been in danger of relegation to the lowest division of the Davis Cup in 2010.

Belgium were drawn as the home team under the rotation policy used by the organizers. They chose to play the tie on a clay surface in the Flanders Expo, an indoor arena in Ghent. The Belgians opted for a clay surface in the hope of unsettling Andy Murray, the highest ranked player on either side. The choice of surface led Murray to question whether he would participate in the 2015 ATP World Tour Finals, played on a hard court in the week before the Davis Cup final, due to the difficulty in transitioning between surfaces. Murray's comments led ITF executive president Chris Kermode to state that the Tour Finals was a mandatory event. Murray participated in the finals, but was eliminated during the group stage.

On the weekend before the tie, transport systems in the capital city of Brussels were shut down by the Belgian authorities due to security concerns relating to the recent attacks in Paris. The British team delayed travelling to Belgium by 24 hours due to the security concerns, with the venue being located 35 km (22 mi) from Brussels.

For his squad, Belgium captain Johan Van Herck selected Kimmer Coppejans, Ruben Bemelmans, Steve Darcis and David Goffin. The team was led by Goffin, ranked 16th in the world and possessing a strong record in Davis Cup singles matches. Their selection was relatively straightforward, as no other Belgian players possessed significant Davis Cup experience or were ranked in the top 200. Great Britain captain Leon Smith named a five-man provisional squad of Murray, his brother Jamie, James Ward, Kyle Edmund and Dominic Inglot. The team was led by Andy Murray, ranked second in the world and likely to play in the doubles match with his brother. Smith later reduced the squad by omitting Inglot, a specialist doubles player who would only have been used if either Murray had been injured.

Smith opted to use Edmund in the opening singles instead of Ward, due to his recent success in winning an ATP Challenger Tour event held on clay (the 2015 Copa Fila). This meant that Edmund made his Davis Cup debut in the final, becoming only the sixth player in tournament history to make his debut in a final. Edmund made a flying start to the first singles tie, racing into a two-set lead against Goffin by hitting many forehand winners. Goffin fought back to win in five sets, winning 14 of the last 15 games. Murray levelled the tie by winning in straight sets against Bemelmans. Smith commented that it was the score that would have been expected after the first day, with the two higher-ranked players winning their matches.

With the tie standing level after the first day, Belgian captain Van Herck gambled by selecting Goffin for the doubles (alongside Darcis) instead of Bemelmans. This was an attempt to win the tie by winning the doubles and the two singles matches not contested by Andy Murray. Van Herck also justified his decision by saying he felt they would have a better chance to win by playing from the back of the court, instead of playing a more typical doubles match at the net. The tactic appeared to work, as the Belgian pair won the second set to level the match and then took an early lead in the third. Darcis weakened later in the match and his serve was broken later in the third set, won 6–3 by the Murrays. After Jamie survived seven break points on his serve midway through the fourth set, the Darcis serve was broken again. Andy then closed out the victory, giving Great Britain a 2–1 lead.

Going into the final day, Belgium hoped that Goffin would defeat Andy Murray and force the tie into a decisive fifth rubber. The teams would then have faced an open choice of the other team members for that match, with Edmund nominally scheduled to play Bemelmans. Goffin had only won one game in a recent meeting with Murray, but gave him a much harder match, which ran to almost three hours. Murray survived a break point at 2–2 in the first set, but then raced to a 5–2 lead. Goffin survived three set points on his own serve, but Murray then clinched the set in his next service game. Goffin again resisted pressure on his own serve for most of the second set, but was broken in the 11th game. Murray held serve to win the second set. Goffin then fought back by breaking the Murray serve early in the third set, but was then immediately broken himself. Murray then raced to victory, winning the match on his second match point with a backhand lob. This gave Great Britain an unassailable 3–1 lead, with the two teams opting not to play the dead fifth rubber.

The win was Great Britain's first Davis Cup victory since 1936, when Fred Perry and Bunny Austin contributed to a final win against Australia. Andy Murray became only the third player, after John McEnroe and Mats Wilander, to win the maximum eight singles matches in a Davis Cup tournament. With his three victories in doubles matches with his brother, he also became only the fourth man to win 11 points in a tournament.

==== Summary ====
Belgium
1
Flanders Expo, Ghent, Belgium
27–29 November 2015
Clay (i)

Great Britain
3

			1	2	3	4	5
1	(Belgium) (United Kingdom)	David Goffin; Kyle Edmund	3; 6	1; 6	6; 2	6; 1	6; 0
2	(Belgium) (United Kingdom)	Ruben Bemelmans; Andy Murray	3; 6	2; 6	5; 7
3	(Belgium) (United Kingdom)	Steve Darcis / David Goffin; Andy Murray / Jamie Murray	4; 6	6; 4	3; 6	2; 6
4	(Belgium) (United Kingdom)	David Goffin; Andy Murray	3; 6	5; 7	3; 6
5	(Belgium) (United Kingdom)	Ruben Bemelmans; Kyle Edmund						not played

== World Group play-offs ==
Date: 18–20 September

The eight losing teams in the World Group, first round ties, and eight winners of the Zonal Group I final round ties competed in the World Group play-offs for spots in the 2016 World Group.

Seeded teams

1. Czech Republic
2. Switzerland
3. Italy
4. United States
5. Japan
6. Germany
7. Croatia
8. Slovakia

Unseeded teams

- Brazil
- Colombia
- Dominican Republic
- India
- Netherlands
- Poland
- Russia
- Uzbekistan

Home team	Score	Visiting team	Location	Venue	Door	Surface
India	1–3	Czech Republic	New Delhi	R.K. Khanna Tennis Complex	Outdoor	Hard
Switzerland	4–1	Netherlands	Geneva	Palexpo	Indoor	Hard
Russia	1–4	Italy	Irkutsk	Baikal Arena	Indoor	Hard
Uzbekistan	1–3	United States	Tashkent	Olympic Tennis School	Outdoor	Clay
Colombia	2–3	Japan	Pereira	Club Campestre	Outdoor	Clay
Dominican Republic	1–4	Germany	Santo Domingo	Centro Nacional de Tenis del Parque del Este	Outdoor	Hard
Brazil	1–3	Croatia	Florianópolis	Costão do Santinho	Outdoor	Clay
Poland	3–2	Slovakia	Gdynia	Gdynia Sports Arena	Indoor	Hard

- Croatia, Czech Republic, Germany, Italy, Japan, Switzerland and United States remained in the World Group in 2016.
- Poland was promoted to the World Group in 2016.
- Brazil was relegated to Zonal Group I in 2016.
- Colombia, Dominican Republic, India, Netherlands, Russia, Slovakia and Uzbekistan remained in Zonal Group I in 2016.

== Americas Zone ==
=== Group I ===
Seeds: All seeds and Uruguay received a bye into the second round.

1. Colombia
2. Ecuador

Remaining nations:

- Barbados
- Dominican Republic
- Uruguay

==== Draw ====
Second round play-offs
Saint Michael, Barbados (hard)
Uruguay	2
Barbados	3

First round play-offs
bye
Uruguay
Saint Michael, Barbados (hard)
Barbados	2
Ecuador	3

First round
1	Colombia
bye
Uruguay
bye
Saint Michael, Barbados (hard)
Barbados	2
Dominican Republic	3
bye
2	Ecuador

Second round
Montevideo, Uruguay (clay)
1	Colombia	3
Uruguay	2
Santo Domingo, Dominican Republic (clay)
Dominican Republic	3
2	Ecuador	2

- Uruguay relegated to Group II in 2016.
- Colombia and Dominican Republic advance to World Group Play-off.

=== Group II ===
Seeds:

1. Venezuela
2. Chile
3. Mexico
4. El Salvador

Remaining nations:

- Bolivia
- Costa Rica
- Peru
- Puerto Rico

==== Draw ====
Play-offs
Bayamón, Puerto Rico (hard)
Costa Rica	0
Puerto Rico	5
Lima, Peru (clay)
Bolivia	2
Peru	3

First Round
Caracas, Venezuela (hard)
1	Venezuela	5
Costa Rica	0
Humacao, Puerto Rico (hard)
3	El Salvador	3
Puerto Rico	2
Mérida, Mexico (hard)
Bolivia	1
4	Mexico	3
Santiago, Chile (clay)
Peru	0
2	Chile	5

Second Round
Caracas, Venezuela (hard)
1	Venezuela	3
3	El Salvador	2
Talcahuano, Chile (indoor clay)
4	Mexico	0
2	Chile	5

Third Round
Santiago, Chile (clay)
1	Venezuela	0
2	Chile	5

- Costa Rica and Bolivia relegated to Group III in 2016.
- Chile promoted to Group I in 2016.

=== Group III ===
Date: 20–25 July

Location: Panama City, Panama (clay)

- Bahamas
- Bermuda
- Cuba
- Guatemala
- Honduras
- Jamaica
- Panama
- Paraguay
- Trinidad and Tobago

Group A

	Paraguay	Cuba	Honduras	Panama	RR W–L	Matches W–L	Sets W–L	Games W–L	Standings
Paraguay		3–0	3–0	3–0	3–0	9–0	18–2	114–65	1
Cuba	0–3		2–1	3–0	2–1	5–4	12–9	104–100	2
Honduras	0–3	1–2		2–1	1–2	3–6	7–14	86–111	3
Panama	0–3	0–3	1–2		0–3	1–8	5–17	92–120	4

Group B

	Guatemala	Jamaica	Bahamas	Trinidad and Tobago	Bermuda	RR W–L	Matches W–L	Sets W–L	Games W–L	Standings
Guatemala		2–1	3–0	3–0	3–0	4–0	11–1	22–5	157–98	1
Jamaica	1–2		2–1	3–0	2–1	3–1	8–4	18–9	142–120	2
Bahamas	0–3	1–2		2–1	3–0	2–2	6–6	14–12	128–122	3
Trinidad and Tobago	0–3	0–3	1–2		2–1	1–3	3–9	6–20	97–144	4
Bermuda	0–3	1–2	0–3	1–2		0–4	2–10	7–21	114–154	5

7th-place play-off

- Panama 2–0 Trinidad and Tobago

5th-place play-off

- Honduras 2–0 Bahamas

Promotion play-off

- Paraguay 2–0 Jamaica
- Guatemala 2–0 Cuba

Paraguay and Guatemala promoted to Group II in 2016.

== Asia/Oceania Zone ==
=== Group I ===
Seeds: All seeds received a bye into the second round.

1. Uzbekistan
2. India

Remaining nations:

- China
- South Korea
- New Zealand
- Thailand

==== Draw ====
Second-round play-offs
Thailand	0
China	5

First-round play-offs
bye
Thailand
China
bye

First Round
1	Uzbekistan
bye
Nonthaburi, Thailand (hard)
South Korea	3
Thailand	2
Auckland, New Zealand (hard)
China	1
New Zealand	4
bye
2	India

Second Round
Tashkent, Uzbekistan (clay)
1	Uzbekistan	3
South Korea	2
Christchurch, NZ (indoor hard)
New Zealand	2
2	India	3

- Thailand relegated to Group II in 2016.
- Uzbekistan and India advance to World Group play-off.

=== Group II ===
Seeds:

1. Chinese Taipei
2. Pakistan
3. Philippines
4. Indonesia

Remaining nations:

- Iran
- Kuwait
- Lebanon
- Sri Lanka

==== Draw ====
Play-offs
Colombo, Sri Lanka (clay)
Lebanon	2
Sri Lanka	3
Tehran, Iran (clay)
Iran	1
Kuwait	3

First Round
Kaohsiung, Taiwan (hard)
1	Chinese Taipei	5
Lebanon	0
Pasig, Philippines (indoor clay)
3	Philippines	5
Sri Lanka	0
Palembang, Indonesia (hard)
Iran	0
4	Indonesia	5
Colombo, Sri Lanka (clay)
Kuwait	2
2	Pakistan	3

Second Round
Kaohsiung, Chinese Taipei (hard)
1	Chinese Taipei	3
3	Philippines	1
Jakarta, Indonesia (hard)
4	Indonesia	1
2	Pakistan	3

Third Round
İzmir, Turkey (hard)
1	Chinese Taipei	2
2	Pakistan	3

- Lebanon and Iran relegated to Group III in 2016.
- Pakistan promoted to Group I in 2016.

=== Group III ===
Date: 25–28 March

Location: Kuala Lumpur, Malaysia (hard)

Seeds

1. Malaysia
2. Vietnam
3. Hong Kong
4. Syria
5. Cambodia
6. Saudi Arabia
7. Qatar
8. Turkmenistan

Group A

	Malaysia	Hong Kong	Qatar	Saudi Arabia	RR W–L	Matches W–L	Sets W–L	Games W–L	Standings
Malaysia		2–1	3–0	3–0	3–0	8–1	17–3	113–64	1
Hong Kong	1–2		2–1	3–0	2–1	6–3	13–9	113–90	2
Qatar	0–3	1–2		3–0	1–2	4–5	10–12	97–107	3
Saudi Arabia	0–3	0–3	0–3		0–3	0–9	2–18	57–119	4

Group B

	Vietnam	Turkmenistan	Syria	Cambodia	RR W–L	Matches W–L	Sets W–L	Games W–L	Standings
Vietnam		3–0	2–1	3–0	3–0	8–1	16–2	105–54	1
Turkmenistan	0–3		2–1	2–1	2–1	4–5	8–12	84–105	2
Syria	1–2	1–2		2–1	1–2	4–5	9–10	94–85	3
Cambodia	0–3	1–2	1–2		0–3	2–7	5–14	65–104	4

Relegation play-off

- Qatar 1–2 Cambodia
- Syria 3–0 Saudi Arabia

Qatar† and Saudi Arabia relegated to Group IV in 2016.

† Relegation to Group IV were ultimately not enforced.

Promotion play-off

- Malaysia 2–0 Turkmenistan
- Vietnam 2–0 Hong Kong

Malaysia and Vietnam promoted to Group II in 2016.

=== Group IV ===
Date: 27 April–2 May

Location: Isa Town, Bahrain (hard)

Seeds

1. Pacific Oceania
2. United Arab Emirates
3. Jordan
4. Bangladesh
5. Singapore
6. Iraq
7. Oman
8. Bahrain
9. Kyrgyzstan

Group A

	Pacific Oceania	Jordan	Bahrain	Iraq	RR W–L	Matches W–L	Sets W–L	Games W–L	Standings
Pacific Oceania		2–1	3–0	2–1	3–0	7–2	15–8	122–90	1
Jordan	1–2		2–1	2–1	2–1	5–4	13–10	114–109	2
Bahrain	0–3	1–2		2–1	1–2	3–6	8–13	94–117	3
Iraq	1–2	1–2	1–2		0–3	3–6	8–13	95–109	4

Group B

	Singapore	United Arab Emirates	Bangladesh	Oman	Kyrgyzstan	RR W–L	Matches W–L	Sets W–L	Games W–L	Standings
Singapore		2–1	3–0	3–0	3–0	4–0	11–1	23–3	153–63	1
United Arab Emirates	1–2		3–0	3–0	3–0	3–1	10–2	21–7	156–83	2
Bangladesh	0–3	0–3		3–0	3–0	2–2	6–6	13–12	111–91	3
Oman	0–3	0–3	0–3		3–0	1–3	3–9	7–18	70–125	4
Kyrgyzstan	0–3	0–3	0–3	0–3		0–4	0–12	0–24	17–145	5

7th-place play-off

- Iraq 2–1 Oman

5th-place play-off

- Bahrain 1–2 Bangladesh

Promotion play-off

- Pacific Oceania 2–1 United Arab Emirates
- Singapore 2–0 Jordan

Pacific Oceania and Singapore promoted to Group III in 2016.

== Europe/Africa Zone ==
=== Group I ===
Seeds: The top three seeds received a bye into the second round.

1. Spain
2. Ukraine
3. Netherlands
4. Israel

Remaining nations:

- Austria
- Denmark
- Lithuania
- Poland
- Romania
- Russia
- Slovakia
- Slovenia
- Sweden

==== Draw ====
Second Round Play-offs
Slagelse, Denmark (indoor hard)
Denmark	2
Sweden	3
Kranj, Slovenia (indoor hard)
Slovenia	5
Lithuania	0

First Round Play-offs
Odense, Denmark (indoor hard)
1	Spain	5
Denmark	0
bye
Sweden
Tel Aviv, Israel (indoor hard)
Slovenia	2
4	Israel	3
Vilnius, Lithuania (indoor hard)
Lithuania	1
2	Ukraine	4

First Round
1	Spain
bye
Novy Urengoy, Russia (indoor hard)
Russia	4
Denmark	1
3	Netherlands
bye
Örebro, Sweden (indoor hard)
Austria	3
Sweden	2
Bratislava, Slovakia (indoor hard)
Slovakia	5
Slovenia	0
Sibiu, Romania (indoor hard)
Romania	5
4	Israel	0
Płock, Poland (indoor hard)
Lithuania	2
Poland	3
bye
2	Ukraine

Second Round
Vladivostok, Russia (indoor hard)
1	Spain	2
Russia	3
Kitzbühel, Austria (clay)
3	Netherlands	3
Austria	2
Constanța, Romania (clay)
Slovakia	3
Romania	2
Szczecin, Poland (indoor hard)
Poland	3
2	Ukraine	1

- Denmark and Lithuania relegated to Group II in 2016.
- Russia, Netherlands, Slovakia, and Poland advance to World Group Play-off.

=== Group II ===
Seeds:

1. South Africa
2. Latvia
3. Portugal
4. Moldova
5. Bosnia and Herzegovina
6. Finland
7. Belarus
8. Luxembourg

Remaining nations:

- Bulgaria
- Hungary
- Ireland
- Madagascar
- Monaco
- Morocco
- Turkey
- Zimbabwe

==== Draw ====
Play-offs
Centurion, South Africa (hard)
1	South Africa	5
Ireland	0
Roquebrune-Cap-Martin, France (clay)
Morocco	1
Monaco	3
Harare, Zimbabwe (hard)
Zimbabwe	5
4	Moldova	0
Liepāja, Latvia (clay)
Madagascar	2
2	Latvia	3

First Round
Mersin, Turkey (indoor hard)
1	South Africa	2
Turkey	3
Dublin, Ireland (indoor hard)
7	Belarus	5
Ireland	0
Cruz Quebrada, Portugal (indoor hard)
3	Portugal	4
Morocco	1
Roquebrune-Cap-Martin, France (clay)
6	Finland	3
Monaco	2
Harare, Zimbabwe (hard)
Zimbabwe	1
5	Bosnia and Herzegovina	4
Győr, Hungary (indoor hard)
Hungary	4
4	Moldova	1
Esch-sur-Alzette, Lux. (indoor hard)
Madagascar	2
8	Luxembourg	3
Jūrmala, Latvia (indoor hard)
Bulgaria	4
2	Latvia	1

Second Round
Istanbul, Turkey (hard)
Turkey	2
7	Belarus	3
Viana do Castelo, Portugal (clay)
3	Portugal	4
6	Finland	1
Siófok, Hungary (clay)
5	Bosnia and Herzegovina	2
Hungary	3
Luxembourg City, Luxembourg (clay)
8	Luxembourg	0
Bulgaria	5

Third Round
Viana do Castelo, Portugal (clay)
7	Belarus	2
3	Portugal	3
Sofia, Bulgaria (clay)
Hungary	3
Bulgaria	2

- Ireland, Morocco, Moldova, and Madagascar relegated to Group III in 2016.
- Portugal and Hungary promoted to Group I in 2016.

=== Group III Europe ===
Date: 15–18 July

Location: City of San Marino, San Marino (clay)

Seeds:

1. Cyprus
2. Estonia
3. Macedonia
4. Georgia

Remaining nations:

- Albania
- Armenia
- Greece
- Iceland
- Liechtenstein
- Malta
- Montenegro
- Norway
- San Marino

Group A

	Cyprus	Greece	San Marino	RR W–L	Matches W–L	Sets W–L	Games W–L	Standings
Cyprus		2–1	3–0	2–0	5–1	11–2	71–31	1
Greece	1–2		3–0	1–1	4–2	8–6	65–60	2
San Marino	0–3	0–3		0–2	0–6	1–12	31–76	3

Group B

	Estonia	Montenegro	Liechtenstein	RR W–L	Matches W–L	Sets W–L	Games W–L	Standings
Estonia		3–0	3–0	2–0	6–0	12–0	72–21	1
Montenegro	0–3		3–0	1–1	3–3	6–6	51–51	2
Liechtenstein	0–3	0–3		0–2	0–6	0–12	23–74	3

Group C

	Norway	Macedonia	Armenia	RR W–L	Matches W–L	Sets W–L	Games W–L	Standings
Norway		3–0	3–0	2–0	6–0	12–3	81–46	1
Macedonia	0–3		3–0	1–1	3–3	9–6	73–55	2
Armenia	0–3	0–3		0–2	0–6	0–12	19–72	3

Group D

	Georgia	Malta	Iceland	Albania	RR W–L	Matches W–L	Sets W–L	Games W–L	Standings
Georgia		3–0	3–0	3–0	3–0	9–0	18–0	108–17	1
Malta	0–3		3–0	3–0	2–1	6–3	12–8	90–74	2
Iceland	0–3	0–3		3–0	1–2	3–6	7–12	71–94	3
Albania	0–3	0–3	0–3		0–3	0–9	1–18	29–113	4

9th to 12th-place play-off

- San Marino 2–0 Armenia
- Liechtenstein 2–1 Iceland

5th to 8th-place play-off

- Greece 0–2 Macedonia
- Montenegro 2–1 Malta

Promotion play-off

- Cyprus 0–2 Norway
- Estonia 0–2 Georgia

Norway and Georgia promoted to Group II in 2016.

=== Group III Africa ===
Date: 26–29 October

Location: Cairo, Egypt (clay)

- Algeria
- Benin
- Egypt
- Ghana
- Libya
- Mozambique
- Namibia
- Tunisia

Group A

	Tunisia	Namibia	Algeria	Ghana	RR W–L	Matches W–L	Sets W–L	Games W–L	Standings
Tunisia		3–0	3–0	3–0	3–0	9–0	18–0	111–33	1
Namibia	0–3		2–1	2–1	2–1	4–5	9–11	71–96	2
Algeria	0–3	1–2		3–0	1–2	4–5	8–12	76–97	3
Ghana	0–3	0–3	1–2		0–3	1–8	4–16	76–108	4

Group B

	Egypt	Benin	Mozambique	Libya	RR W–L	Matches W–L	Sets W–L	Games W–L	Standings
Egypt		2–1	3–0	3–0	3–0	8–1	17–2	110–37	1
Benin	1–2		2–1	3–0	2–1	6–3	13–7	92–75	2
Mozambique	0–3	1–2		3–0	1–2	4–5	7–11	62–78	3
Libya	0–3	0–3	0–3		0–3	0–9	0–17	27–101	4

7th-place play-off

- Ghana 2–0 Libya

5th-place play-off

- Algeria 2–1 Mozambique

Promotion play-off

- Tunisia 2–0 Benin
- Egypt 2–0 Namibia

Tunisia and Egypt promoted to Group II in 2016.
