= 2012 Davis Cup Asia/Oceania Zone Group IV =

International tennis competition

The Asia/Oceania Zone is one of the three zones of regional Davis Cup competition in 2012.

In the Asia/Oceania Zone there are four different groups in which teams compete against each other to advance to the next group.

== Format ==
The ten teams were split into two pools of five, the top nation from each pool played against the runner-up from the other pool. The two winners were promoted.

It was played in the week commencing 16 April 2012 at Doha, Qatar and was played on outdoor hard court.

== Groups ==
=== Group A ===
Team	Ties Played	Ties Won	Ties Lost	Matches Won	Matches Lost	Standing
United Arab Emirates	4	4	0	10	2	1
Turkmenistan	4	3	1	10	2	2
Saudi Arabia	4	2	2	7	5	3
Iraq	4	1	3	2	10	4
Bahrain	4	0	4	1	11	5

==== Bahrain vs. Turkmenistan ====
Bahrain
0
Khalifa International Tennis and Squash Complex, Doha, Qatar
16 April 2012
hard (outdoor)

Turkmenistan
3

			1	2	3
1	(Bahrain) (Turkmenistan)	Yusuf E. Qaed; Eziz Davletov	2; 6	3; 6
2	(Bahrain) (Turkmenistan)	Hasan Abdul-Nabi; Aleksandr Ernepesov	4; 6	2; 6
3	(Bahrain) (Turkmenistan)	Abdulla Mohamed / Yusuf E. Qaed; Eziz Davletov / Jamshid Ilmuradov	2; 6	2; 6

==== Saudi Arabia vs. Iraq ====
Saudi Arabia
3
Khalifa International Tennis and Squash Complex, Doha, Qatar
16 April 2012
hard (outdoor)

Iraq
0

			1	2	3
1	(Saudi Arabia) (Iraq)	Fahad Al Saad; Ali Hashim	6; 0	6; 1
2	(Saudi Arabia) (Iraq)	Omar Al Thagib; Ahmed Hamzah Abdulhasan	6; 4	6; 0
3	(Saudi Arabia) (Iraq)	Zaki Al Abdullah / Omar Al Thagib; Ahmed Hamzah Abdulhasan / Ali Hashim	6; 0	6; 2

==== Iraq vs. Turkmenistan ====
Iraq
0
Khalifa International Tennis and Squash Complex, Doha, Qatar
17 April 2012
hard (outdoor)

Turkmenistan
3

			1	2	3
1	(Iraq) (Turkmenistan)	Ali Hashim; Eziz Davletov	2; 6	1; 6
2	(Iraq) (Turkmenistan)	Ahmed Hamzah Abdulhasan; Aleksandr Ernepesov	2; 6	1; 6
3	(Iraq) (Turkmenistan)	Maab Abdulrazaq Yaseen / Barakat Zainy; Eziz Davletov / Jamshid Ilmuradov	4; 6	3; 6

==== United Arab Emirates vs. Saudi Arabia ====
United Arab Emirates
2
Khalifa International Tennis and Squash Complex, Doha, Qatar
17 April 2012
hard (outdoor)

Saudi Arabia
1

			1	2	3
1	(United Arab Emirates) (Saudi Arabia)	Hamad Abbas Janahi; Fahad Al Saad	5; 7	0; 6
2	(United Arab Emirates) (Saudi Arabia)	Omar Awadhy; Omar Al Thagib	6; 2	6; 2
3	(United Arab Emirates) (Saudi Arabia)	Omar Awadhy / Hamad Abbas Janahi; Fahad Al Saad / Omar Al Thagib	6; 2	6; 2

==== Saudi Arabia vs. Turkmenistan ====
Saudi Arabia
0
Khalifa International Tennis and Squash Complex, Doha, Qatar
18 April 2012
hard (outdoor)

Turkmenistan
3

			1	2	3
1	(Saudi Arabia) (Turkmenistan)	Zaki Al Abdullah; Georgiy Pochay	6; 4	2; 6	3; 6
2	(Saudi Arabia) (Turkmenistan)	Fahad Al Saad; Aleksandr Ernepesov	6; 4	2; 6	3; 6
3	(Saudi Arabia) (Turkmenistan)	Omar Al Thagib / Abdulmalek Burasais; Eziz Davletov / Jamshid Ilmuradov	6; 1	5; 7	4; 6

==== United Arab Emirates vs. Bahrain ====
United Arab Emirates
3
Khalifa International Tennis and Squash Complex, Doha, Qatar
18 April 2012
hard (outdoor)

Bahrain
0

			1	2	3
1	(United Arab Emirates) (Bahrain)	Hamad Abbas Janahi; Yusuf E. Qaed	6; 2	6; 1
2	(United Arab Emirates) (Bahrain)	Omar Awadhy; Hasan Abdul-Nabi	6; 0	6; 2
3	(United Arab Emirates) (Bahrain)	Omar Awadhy / Hamad Abbas Janahi; Abdulla Mohamed / Yusuf E. Qaed	6; 4	6; 4

==== United Arab Emirates vs. Iraq ====
United Arab Emirates
3
Khalifa International Tennis and Squash Complex, Doha, Qatar
19 April 2012
hard (outdoor)

Iraq
0

			1	2	3
1	(United Arab Emirates) (Iraq)	Hamad Abbas Janahi; Barakat Zainy	6; 1	6; 4
2	(United Arab Emirates) (Iraq)	Omar Awadhy; Maab Abdulrazaq Yaseen	6; 0	6; 1
3	(United Arab Emirates) (Iraq)	Soud Al Ali / Hamad Abbas Janahi; Maab Abdulrazaq Yaseen / Barakat Zainy	6; 1	6; 2

==== Bahrain vs. Saudi Arabia ====
Bahrain
0
Khalifa International Tennis and Squash Complex, Doha, Qatar
19 April 2012
hard (outdoor)

Saudi Arabia
3

			1	2	3
1	(Bahrain) (Saudi Arabia)	Yusuf E. Qaed; Fahad Al Saad	3; 6	5; 7
2	(Bahrain) (Saudi Arabia)	Abdulla Mohamed; Abdulmalek Burasais	1; 6	2; 6
3	(Bahrain) (Saudi Arabia)	Hasan Abdul-Nabi / Abdulla Mohamed; Zaki Al Abdullah / Omar Al Thagib	7^{7} 6^{2}	4; 6	4; 6

==== United Arab Emirates vs. Turkmenistan ====
United Arab Emirates
2
Khalifa International Tennis and Squash Complex, Doha, Qatar
20 April 2012
hard (outdoor)

Turkmenistan
1

			1	2	3
1	(United Arab Emirates) (Turkmenistan)	Hamad Abbas Janahi; Eziz Davletov	6; 4	6; 2
2	(United Arab Emirates) (Turkmenistan)	Omar Awadhy; Aleksandr Ernepesov	6; 3	6; 4
3	(United Arab Emirates) (Turkmenistan)	Soud Al Ali / Hamad Abbas Janahi; Jamshid Ilmuradov / Georgiy Pochay	3; 6	1; 6

==== Bahrain vs. Iraq ====
Bahrain
1
Khalifa International Tennis and Squash Complex, Doha, Qatar
20 April 2012
hard (outdoor)

Iraq
2

			1	2	3
1	(Bahrain) (Iraq)	Yusuf E. Qaed; Ali Hashim	6; 2	6; 4
2	(Bahrain) (Iraq)	Hasan Abdul-Nabi; Ahmed Hamzah Abdulhasan	1; 6	4; 6
3	(Bahrain) (Iraq)	Abdulla Mohamed / Yusuf E. Qaed; Ahmed Hamzah Abdulhasan / Ali Hashim	5; 7	3; 6

=== Group B ===
Team	Ties Played	Ties Won	Ties Lost	Matches Won	Matches Lost	Standing
Cambodia	4	4	0	10	2	1
Qatar	4	3	1	8	4	2
Singapore	4	2	2	5	7	3
Jordan	4	1	3	5	7	4
Myanmar	4	0	4	2	10	5

==== Singapore vs. Cambodia ====
Singapore
0
Khalifa International Tennis and Squash Complex, Doha, Qatar
16 April 2012
hard (outdoor)

Cambodia
3

			1	2	3
1	(Singapore) (Cambodia)	Hao Yuan Ng; Pannhara Mam	2; 6	4; 6
2	(Singapore) (Cambodia)	Roy Hobbs; Kenny Bun	2; 6	1; 6
3	(Singapore) (Cambodia)	Roy Hobbs / Rohan Kamdar; Kenny Bun / Pannhara Mam	6^{8} 7^{10}	3; 6

==== Qatar vs. Myanmar ====
Qatar
2
Khalifa International Tennis and Squash Complex, Doha, Qatar
16 April 2012
hard (outdoor)

Myanmar
1

			1	2	3
1	(Qatar) (Myanmar)	Jabor Al-Mutawa; Nge Hnaung	6; 2	6; 3
2	(Qatar) (Myanmar)	Mousa Shanan Zayed; Phyo Min Thar	6; 2	5; 7	3; 6
3	(Qatar) (Myanmar)	Jabor Al-Mutawa / Mousa Shanan Zayed; Nge Hnaung / Min Min	7^{7} 6^{2}	7^{7} 6^{4}

==== Jordan vs. Myanmar ====
Jordan
2
Khalifa International Tennis and Squash Complex, Doha, Qatar
17 April 2012
hard (outdoor)

Myanmar
1

			1	2	3
1	(Jordan) (Myanmar)	Yazan Abdelaziz Abudayeh; Nge Hnaung	6^{8} 7^{10}	6; 3	4; 6
2	(Jordan) (Myanmar)	Fawaz El Hourani; Phyo Min Thar	7^{7} 6^{4}	6; 1
3	(Jordan) (Myanmar)	Yazan Abdelaziz Abudayeh / Fawaz El Hourani; Nge Hnaung / Phyo Min Thar	6; 4	5; 7	8; 6

==== Qatar vs. Cambodia ====
Qatar
1
Khalifa International Tennis and Squash Complex, Doha, Qatar
17 April 2012
hard (outdoor)

Cambodia
2

			1	2	3
1	(Qatar) (Cambodia)	Jabor Al-Mutawa; Pannhara Mam	2; 6	3; 6
2	(Qatar) (Cambodia)	Mousa Shanan Zayed; Kenny Bun	0; 6	0; 6
3	(Qatar) (Cambodia)	Jabor Al-Mutawa / Mousa Shanan Zayed; Pannhara Mam / Vetu Mam	2; 6	6; 2	7; 5

==== Jordan vs. Singapore ====
Jordan
1
Khalifa International Tennis and Squash Complex, Doha, Qatar
18 April 2012
hard (outdoor)

Singapore
2

			1	2	3
1	(Jordan) (Singapore)	Yazan Abdelaziz Abudayeh; Hao Yuan Ng	7^{7} 6^{2}	7^{8} 6^{6}
2	(Jordan) (Singapore)	Fawaz El Hourani; Roy Hobbs	4; 6	6; 3	3; 6
3	(Jordan) (Singapore)	Yazan Abdelaziz Abudayeh / Fawaz El Hourani; Roy Hobbs / Rohan Kamdar	4; 6	6; 4	3; 6

==== Myanmar vs. Cambodia ====
Myanmar
0
Khalifa International Tennis and Squash Complex, Doha, Qatar
18 April 2012
hard (outdoor)

Cambodia
3

			1	2	3
1	(Myanmar) (Cambodia)	Aung Kyaw Naing; Pannhara Mam	1; 6	5; 7
2	(Myanmar) (Cambodia)	Phyo Min Thar; Kenny Bun	0; 6	0; 6
3	(Myanmar) (Cambodia)	Nge Hnaung / Min Min; Kenny Bun / Pannhara Mam	4; 6	2; 6

==== Qatar vs. Jordan ====
Qatar
2
Khalifa International Tennis and Squash Complex, Doha, Qatar
19 April 2012
hard (outdoor)

Jordan
1

			1	2	3
1	(Qatar) (Jordan)	Jabor Al-Mutawa; Yazan Abdelaziz Abudayeh	6; 4	6; 1
2	(Qatar) (Jordan)	Mousa Shanan Zayed; Fawaz El Hourani	6^{5} 7^{7}	2; 6
3	(Qatar) (Jordan)	Jabor Al-Mutawa / Mousa Shanan Zayed; Yazan Abdelaziz Abudayeh / Fawaz El Hourani	6; 4	3; 6	6; 4

==== Singapore vs. Myanmar ====
Singapore
3
Khalifa International Tennis and Squash Complex, Doha, Qatar
19 April 2012
hard (outdoor)

Myanmar
0

			1	2	3
1	(Singapore) (Myanmar)	Rohan Kamdar; Nge Hnaung	6; 0	6; 3
2	(Singapore) (Myanmar)	Roy Hobbs; Phyo Min Thar	6; 1	6; 3
3	(Singapore) (Myanmar)	Roy Hobbs / Rohan Kamdar; Min Min / Phyo Min Thar	6; 4	1; 6	6; 4

==== Jordan vs. Cambodia ====
Jordan
1
Khalifa International Tennis and Squash Complex, Doha, Qatar
20 April 2012
hard (outdoor)

Cambodia
2

			1	2	3
1	(Jordan) (Cambodia)	Fawaz El Hourani; Pannhara Mam	1; 6	2; 6
2	(Jordan) (Cambodia)	Seif Adas; Kenny Bun	1; 6	1; 6
3	(Jordan) (Cambodia)	Yazan Abdelaziz Abudayeh / Seif Adas; Samneang Long / Vetu Mam	6; 4	6; 1

==== Qatar vs. Singapore ====
Qatar
3
Khalifa International Tennis and Squash Complex, Doha, Qatar
20 April 2012
hard (outdoor)

Singapore
0

			1	2	3
1	(Qatar) (Singapore)	Jabor Al-Mutawa; Rohan Kamdar	4; 6	7; 6	6; 1
2	(Qatar) (Singapore)	Mousa Shanan Zayed; Roy Hobbs	6; 0	6; 1
3	(Qatar) (Singapore)	Jabor Al-Mutawa / Mousa Shanan Zayed; Kai Yi Lee / Hao Yuan Ng	6; 1	6; 4

== Play-offs ==
=== 1st to 4th play-off ===
==== Qatar vs. United Arab Emirates ====
Qatar
1
Khalifa International Tennis and Squash Complex, Doha, Qatar
21 April 2012
hard (outdoor)

United Arab Emirates
2

			1	2	3
1	(Qatar) (United Arab Emirates)	Jabor Al-Mutawa; Hamad Abbas Janahi	1; 6	6; 3	2; 6
2	(Qatar) (United Arab Emirates)	Mousa Shanan Zayed; Omar Awadhy	0; 6	1; 6
3	(Qatar) (United Arab Emirates)	Abdulrahman Al Harib / Mousa Shanan Zayed; Soud Al Ali / Abdulrahman Al Janahi	6; 2	6; 2

==== Turkmenistan vs. Cambodia ====
Turkmenistan
0
Khalifa International Tennis and Squash Complex, Doha, Qatar
21 April 2012
hard (outdoor)

Cambodia
3

			1	2	3
1	(Turkmenistan) (Cambodia)	Eziz Davletov; Pannhara Mam	0; 6	0; 6
2	(Turkmenistan) (Cambodia)	Aleksandr Ernepesov; Kenny Bun	3; 6	0; 6
3	(Turkmenistan) (Cambodia)	Eziz Davletov / Jamshid Ilmuradov; Pannhara Mam / Vetu Mam	5; 7	2; 6

=== 5th to 6th play-off ===
==== Saudi Arabia vs. Singapore ====
Saudi Arabia
2
Khalifa International Tennis and Squash Complex, Doha, Qatar
21 April 2012
hard (outdoor)

Singapore
1

			1	2	3
1	(Saudi Arabia) (Singapore)	Fahad Al Saad; Hao Yuan Ng	6; 2	6; 3
2	(Saudi Arabia) (Singapore)	Abdulmalek Burasais; Roy Hobbs	2; 6	6^{4} 7^{7}
3	(Saudi Arabia) (Singapore)	Fahad Al Saad / Abdulmalek Burasais; Rohan Kamdar / Kai Yi Lee	6; 4	6; 2

=== 7th to 8th play-off ===
==== Iraq vs. Jordan ====
Iraq
0
Khalifa International Tennis and Squash Complex, Doha, Qatar
21 April 2012
hard (outdoor)

Jordan
3

			1	2	3
1	(Iraq) (Jordan)	Maab Abdulrazaq Yaseen; Yazan Abdelaziz Abudayeh	1; 6	5; 7
2	(Iraq) (Jordan)	Ahmed Hamzah Abdulhasan; Fawaz El Hourani	2; 6	3; 6
3	(Iraq) (Jordan)	Ahmed Hamzah Abdulhasan / Ali Hashim; Seif Adas / Fawaz El Hourani	4; 6	2; 6

=== 9th to 10th play-off ===
==== Bahrain vs. Myanmar ====
Bahrain
0
Khalifa International Tennis and Squash Complex, Doha, Qatar
21 April 2012
hard (outdoor)

Myanmar
3

			1	2	3
1	(Bahrain) (Myanmar)	Abdulla Mohamed; Nge Hnaung	3; 6	2; 6
2	(Bahrain) (Myanmar)	Yusuf E. Qaed; Phyo Min Thar	2; 6	6^{4} 7^{7}
3	(Bahrain) (Myanmar)	Abdulla Mohamed / Yusuf E. Qaed; Min Min / Phyo Min Thar	4; 6	2; 6

== Final standings ==
Rank	Team
1	Cambodia
2	United Arab Emirates
3	Turkmenistan
4	Qatar
5	Saudi Arabia
6	Singapore
7	Jordan
8	Iraq
9	Myanmar
10	Bahrain

- Cambodia and United Arab Emirates promoted to Group III in 2013.
