= 2024 Davis Cup Asia/Oceania Zone Group IV =

Davis Cup competition in 2024

The Asia/Oceania Zone was the unique zone within Group 4 of the regional Davis Cup competition in 2024. The zone's competition was held in round robin format in Phnom Penh, Cambodia from 10 to 13 July 2024.

== Participating nations ==
- Cambodia
- Iraq
- Kuwait
- Kyrgyzstan
- Myanmar
- Qatar
- Sri Lanka
- United Arab Emirates

== Draw ==
Date: 10–13 July 2024

Location: Morodok Techo National Sports Complex, Phnom Penh, Cambodia (Hard)

Format: Round-robin basis. Two pools of four teams and nations will play each team once in their pool. Nations finishing in the top two of each pool will enter promotional play-offs, with the first of Pool A facing the second of Pool B and the first of Pool B facing the second of Pool A, and the two winners will be promoted to Asia/Oceania Zone Group III in 2025.

Nations finishing in the bottom two of each pool will enter relegation play-offs, with the third of Pool A facing the fourth of Pool B and the third of Pool B facing the fourth of Pool A, and the two lost teams will be relegated to Asia/Oceania Zone Group V in 2025.

=== Seeding ===
Pot	Nation	Rank^{1}	Seed
1	Kyrgyzstan	97	1
1	Cambodia	102	2
2	Sri Lanka	103=	3
2	Kuwait	107	4
3	United Arab Emirates	111	5
3	Iraq	113=	6
4	Qatar	124	7
4	Myanmar	128	8

- ^{1}Davis Cup Rankings as of 18 March 2024

=== Round Robin ===
==== Pool A ====
		QAT	SRI	KGZ	UAE	RR; W–L	Set; W–L	Game; W–L	Standings
7	Qatar		2–1	2–1	3–0	3–0	7–2 (%)	– (%)	1
3	Sri Lanka	1–2		2–1	3–0	2–1	6–3 (%)	– (%)	2
1	Kyrgyzstan	1–2	1–2		3–0	1–2	5–4 (%)	– (%)	3
5	United Arab Emirates	0–3	0–3	0–3		0–3	0–9 (%)	– (%)	4

==== Pool B ====
		KUW	CAM	IRQ	MYA	RR; W–L	Set; W–L	Game; W–L	Standings
4	Kuwait		2–1	3–0	3–0	3–0	8–1 (%)	– (%)	1
2	Cambodia	1–2		3–0	3–0	2–1	7–2 (%)	– (%)	2
6	Iraq	0–3	0–3		3–0	1–2	3–6 (%)	– (%)	3
8	Myanmar	0–3	0–3	0–3		0–3	0–9 (%)	– (%)	4

Standings are determined by: 1. number of wins; 2. number of matches; 3. in two-team ties, head-to-head records; 4. in three-team ties, (a) percentage of sets won (head-to-head records if two teams remain tied), then (b) percentage of games won (head-to-head records if two teams remain tied), then (c) Davis Cup rankings.

=== Playoffs ===
Placing	A Team	Score	B Team
Promotional	Qatar	0–2	Cambodia
Promotional	Kuwait	0–2	Sri Lanka
Relegation	Kyrgyzstan	2–1	Myanmar
Relegation	Iraq	2–1	United Arab Emirates

- Cambodia and Sri Lanka were promoted to 2025 Davis Cup Asia/Oceania Zone Group III.
- Myanmar and United Arab Emirates were relegated to 2025 Davis Cup Asia/Oceania Zone Group V.

== Round Robin ==
=== Pool A ===
==== Kyrgyzstan vs. United Arab Emirates ====
Kyrgyzstan
3
Morodok Techo National Sports Complex, Phnom Penh, Cambodia
10 July 2024
Hard

United Arab Emirates
0

			1	2	3
1	(Kyrgyzstan) (United Arab Emirates)	Mirgiiaz Mirdzhaliev; Hamad Janahi	6; 1	1; 0		retired
2	(Kyrgyzstan) (United Arab Emirates)	Ilgiz Kamchibekov; Omar Alawadhi	6; 4	6; 3
3	(Kyrgyzstan) (United Arab Emirates)	Kirill Kistanov / Mirgiiaz Mirdzhaliev; Abdulla Ahmad Ahli / Abdulla Al Marzouqi	6; 1	6; 2

==== Sri Lanka vs. Qatar ====
Sri Lanka
1
Morodok Techo National Sports Complex, Phnom Penh, Cambodia
10 July 2024
Hard

Qatar
2

			1	2	3
1	(Sri Lanka) (Qatar)	Ashen Silva; Rashed Nawaf	4; 6	3; 6
2	(Sri Lanka) (Qatar)	Apna Perera; Mubarak Al-Harrasi	3; 6	1; 6
3	(Sri Lanka) (Qatar)	Harshana Godamanna / Thehan Sanjaya Wijemanne; Mousa Al-Harrasi / Mashari Nawaf	6; 4	6; 2

==== Kyrgyzstan vs. Sri Lanka ====
Kyrgyzstan
1
Morodok Techo National Sports Complex, Phnom Penh, Cambodia
11 July 2024
Hard

Sri Lanka
2

			1	2	3
1	(Kyrgyzstan) (Sri Lanka)	Kirill Kistanov; Ashen Silva	6; 3	2; 6	6; 4
2	(Kyrgyzstan) (Sri Lanka)	Ilgiz Kamchibekov; Apna Perera	5; 7	3; 6
3	(Kyrgyzstan) (Sri Lanka)	Kirill Kistanov / Mirgiiaz Mirdzhaliev; Harshana Godamanna / Thehan Sanjaya Wijemanne	4; 6	5; 7

==== United Arab Emirates vs. Qatar ====
United Arab Emirates
0
Morodok Techo National Sports Complex, Phnom Penh, Cambodia
11 July 2024
Hard

Qatar
3

			1	2	3
1	(United Arab Emirates) (Qatar)	Hamad Janahi; Mashari Nawaf	1; 6	0; 6
2	(United Arab Emirates) (Qatar)	Abdulla Al Marzouqi; Mubarak Al-Harrasi	3; 6	0; 6
3	(United Arab Emirates) (Qatar)	Abdulla Ahmad Ahli / Ahmed Badri; Mousa Al-Harrasi / Mubarak Al-Harrasi	0; 6	1; 6

==== Kyrgyzstan vs. Qatar ====
Kyrgyzstan
1
Morodok Techo National Sports Complex, Phnom Penh, Cambodia
12 July 2024
Hard

Qatar
2

			1	2	3
1	(Kyrgyzstan) (Qatar)	Mirgiiaz Mirdzhaliev; Rashed Nawaf	1; 6	7^{7} 6^{3}	0; 6
2	(Kyrgyzstan) (Qatar)	Ilgiz Kamchibekov; Mubarak Al-Harrasi	6^{4} 7^{7}	0; 6
3	(Kyrgyzstan) (Qatar)	Ilgiz Kamchibekov / Kirill Kistanov; Ghanim Al Sulaiti / Mashari Nawaf	6; 3	6; 2

==== Sri Lanka vs. United Arab Emirates ====
Sri Lanka
3
Morodok Techo National Sports Complex, Phnom Penh, Cambodia
12 July 2024
Hard

United Arab Emirates
0

			1	2	3
1	(Sri Lanka) (United Arab Emirates)	Thehan Sanjaya Wijemanne; Abdulla Al Marzouqi	6; 0	6; 0
2	(Sri Lanka) (United Arab Emirates)	Apna Perera; Ahmed Badri	6; 0	6; 0
3	(Sri Lanka) (United Arab Emirates)	Kanika Jayathilake / Ashen Silva; Abdulla Ahmad Ahli / Hamad Janahi	6; 1	6; 3

=== Pool B ===
==== Cambodia vs. Iraq ====
Cambodia
3
Morodok Techo National Sports Complex, Phnom Penh, Cambodia
10 July 2024
Hard

Iraq
0

			1	2	3
1	(Cambodia) (Iraq)	Kenny Bun; Adel Saidi	6; 1	6; 0
2	(Cambodia) (Iraq)	Mathew Krusling; Abdullah Ali Hatem Ghrairi	7^{7} 6^{4}	6; 3
3	(Cambodia) (Iraq)	Sarinreach Leng / Timothy Tep; Amin Al Ubaidy / Mohammed Abuzed Saber Saber	6; 4	6; 3

==== Kuwait vs. Myanmar ====
Kuwait
3
Morodok Techo National Sports Complex, Phnom Penh, Cambodia
10 July 2024
Hard

Myanmar
0

			1	2	3
1	(Kuwait) (Myanmar)	Bader Alabdullah; Hein Htet Zaw	6; 0	6; 0
2	(Kuwait) (Myanmar)	Abdulhamid Mubarak; Hein Latt Kyaw	6; 2	7; 5
3	(Kuwait) (Myanmar)	Ali Alshati / Hussen Alshati; Saw Htut / Aung Myo Thant	6; 4	6; 4

==== Cambodia vs. Myanmar ====
Cambodia
3
Morodok Techo National Sports Complex, Phnom Penh, Cambodia
11 July 2024
Hard

Myanmar
0

			1	2	3
1	(Cambodia) (Myanmar)	Mathew Krusling; Hein Latt Kyaw	6; 4	6; 4
2	(Cambodia) (Myanmar)	Sarinreach Leng; Aung Kyaw Naing	6; 3	6; 2
3	(Cambodia) (Myanmar)	Kenny Bun / Ponlok Khleang; Hein Htet Zaw / Aung Myo Thant	7; 5	6; 2

==== Kuwait vs. Iraq ====
Kuwait
3
Morodok Techo National Sports Complex, Phnom Penh, Cambodia
11 July 2024
Hard

Iraq
0

			1	2	3
1	(Kuwait) (Iraq)	Bader Alabdullah; Adel Saidi	6; 0	2; 0		retired
2	(Kuwait) (Iraq)	Abdulhamid Mubarak; Abdullah Ali Hatem Ghrairi	6; 4	6; 0
3	(Kuwait) (Iraq)	Ali Alshati / Yaqoub Mohammed; Amin Al Ubaidy / Akram M Abdalkarem Al-Saadi	6; 3	6; 2

==== Cambodia vs. Kuwait ====
Cambodia
1
Morodok Techo National Sports Complex, Phnom Penh, Cambodia
12 July 2024
Hard

Kuwait
2

			1	2	3
1	(Cambodia) (Kuwait)	Ponlok Khleang; Bader Alabdullah	3; 6	0; 6
2	(Cambodia) (Kuwait)	Sarinreach Leng; Abdulhamid Mubarak	7^{7} 6^{5}	7; 5
3	(Cambodia) (Kuwait)	Mathew Krusling / Timothy Tep; Bader Alabdullah / Ali Alshati	3; 6	2; 6

==== Iraq vs. Myanmar ====
Iraq
3
Morodok Techo National Sports Complex, Phnom Penh, Cambodia
12 July 2024
Hard

Myanmar
0

			1	2	3
1	(Iraq) (Myanmar)	Mohammed Abuzed Saber Saber; Hein Latt Kyaw	6; 3	7^{7} 6^{5}
2	(Iraq) (Myanmar)	Abdullah Ali Hatem Ghrairi; Aung Kyaw Naing	6; 1	6; 0
3	(Iraq) (Myanmar)	Akram M Abdalkarem Al-Saadi / Abdullah Ali Hatem Ghrairi; Saw Htut / Aung Myo Thant	6; 1	7^{8} 6^{6}

== Play-offs ==
=== Promotional play-offs ===
==== Qatar vs. Cambodia ====
Qatar
0
Morodok Techo National Sports Complex, Phnom Penh, Cambodia
13 July 2024
Hard

Cambodia
2

			1	2	3
1	(Qatar) (Cambodia)	Rashed Nawaf; Kenny Bun	3; 6	4; 6
2	(Qatar) (Cambodia)	Mubarak Al-Harrasi; Sarinreach Leng	6; 1	3; 6	3; 6
3	(Qatar) (Cambodia)	Mousa Al-Harrasi / Rashed Nawaf; Ponlok Khleang / Timothy Tep				not played

==== Kuwait vs. Sri Lanka ====
Kuwait
0
Morodok Techo National Sports Complex, Phnom Penh, Cambodia
13 July 2024
Hard

Sri Lanka
2

			1	2	3
1	(Kuwait) (Sri Lanka)	Bader Alabdullah; Thehan Sanjaya Wijemanne	3; 6	4; 6
2	(Kuwait) (Sri Lanka)	Abdulhamid Mubarak; Apna Perera	6; 1	6^{1} 7^{7}	1; 6
3	(Kuwait) (Sri Lanka)	Bader Alabdullah / Ali Alshati; Kanika Jayathilake / Ashen Silva				not played

=== Relegation play-offs ===
==== Kyrgyzstan vs. Myanmar ====
Kyrgyzstan
2
Morodok Techo National Sports Complex, Phnom Penh, Cambodia
13 July 2024
Hard

Myanmar
1

			1	2	3
1	(Kyrgyzstan) (Myanmar)	Mirgiiaz Mirdzhaliev; Aung Myo Thant	3; 6	3; 6
2	(Kyrgyzstan) (Myanmar)	Ilgiz Kamchibekov; Hein Latt Kyaw	6; 3	6; 2
3	(Kyrgyzstan) (Myanmar)	Kirill Kistanov / Mirgiiaz Mirdzhaliev; Saw Htut / Aung Myo Thant	6; 4	6; 2

==== Iraq vs. United Arab Emirates ====
Iraq
2
Morodok Techo National Sports Complex, Phnom Penh, Cambodia
13 July 2024
Hard

United Arab Emirates
1

			1	2	3
1	(Iraq) (United Arab Emirates)	Adel Saidi; Omar Alawadhi	1; 6	0; 6
2	(Iraq) (United Arab Emirates)	Abdullah Ali Hatem Ghrairi; Abdulla Al Marzouqi	6; 2	6; 3
3	(Iraq) (United Arab Emirates)	Abdullah Ali Hatem Ghrairi / Adel Saidi; Abdulla Ahmad Ahli / Omar Alawadhi	6; 1	6; 1

== Final placements ==
Placing	Teams	
Promoted/First	Cambodia	Sri Lanka
Third	Kuwait	Qatar
Fifth	Iraq	Kyrgyzstan
Relegated/Seventh	Myanmar	United Arab Emirates

- Cambodia and Sri Lanka were promoted to 2025 Davis Cup Asia/Oceania Zone Group III.
- Myanmar and United Arab Emirates were relegated to 2025 Davis Cup Asia/Oceania Zone Group V.
