= 2023 Davis Cup Asia/Oceania Zone Group III =

Davis Cup competition in 2023

The Asia/Oceania Zone was the unique zone within Group 3 of the regional Davis Cup competition in 2023. The zone's competition was held in round robin format in Colombo, Sri Lanka, from 26 to 29 July 2023.

== Participating nations ==
- Cambodia
- Iran
- Jordan
- Malaysia
- Pacific Oceania
- Saudi Arabia
- Sri Lanka
- Vietnam

== Draw ==
Date: 26–29 July 2023

Location: Sri Lanka Tennis Association Courts, Colombo, Sri Lanka (Clay)

Format: Round-robin basis. Two pools of four teams and nations will play each team once in their group. Nations finishing first in each group will be promoted to World Group II play-offs in 2024. Nations finishing second in each group will enter a promotion play-off and the winner will be promoted to World Group II play-offs in 2024.

Nations finishing in the bottom two of each group will enter relegation play-offs, with the third of Group A facing the fourth of Group B, and the third of Group B facing the fourth of Group A and the two lost teams will be relegated to Asia/Oceania Zone Group IV in 2024.

=== Seeding ===
Pot	Nation	Rank^{1}	Seed
1	Pacific Oceania		
1	Vietnam		
2	Jordan		
2	Saudi Arabia		
3	Vietnam		
3	Malaysia		
4	Sri Lanka		
4	Cambodia		

- ^{1}Davis Cup Rankings as of

=== Round Robin ===
==== Pool A ====
	IRN	VIE	KSA	SRI	RR; W–L	Set; W–L	Game; W–L	Standings
Iran		3–0	2–1	3–0	3–0	8–1 (%)	– (%)	1
Vietnam	0–3		2–1	2–1	2–1	4–5 (%)	– (%)	2
Saudi Arabia	1–2	1–2		2–1	1–2	4–5 (%)	– (%)	3
Sri Lanka	0–3	1–2	1–2		0–3	2–7 (%)	– (%)	4

==== Pool B ====
	POC	JOR	MAS	CAM	RR; W–L	Set; W–L	Game; W–L	Standings
Pacific Oceania		2–1	1–2	3–0	2–1	6–3 (%)	– (%)	1
Jordan	1–2		2–1	3–0	2–1	6–3 (%)	– (%)	2
Malaysia	2–1	1–2		3–0	2–1	6–3 (%)	– (%)	3
Cambodia	0–3	0–3	0–3		0–3	0–9 (%)	– (%)	4

Standings are determined by: 1. number of wins; 2. number of matches; 3. in two-team ties, head-to-head records; 4. in three-team ties, (a) percentage of sets won (head-to-head records if two teams remain tied), then (b) percentage of games won (head-to-head records if two teams remain tied), then (c) Davis Cup rankings.

=== Playoffs ===
Placing	A Team	Score	B Team
First	Iran	2–0	Pacific Oceania
Promotional	Vietnam	2–1	Jordan
Relegation	Saudi Arabia	3–0	Cambodia
Relegation	Sri Lanka	1–2	Malaysia

- Iran, Pacific Oceania and Vietnam were promoted to 2024 Davis Cup World Group II play-offs.
- Cambodia and Sri Lanka were relegated to 2024 Davis Cup Asia/Oceania Zone Group IV.

== Round Robin ==
=== Pool A ===
==== Vietnam vs. Iran ====
Vietnam
0
Sri Lanka Tennis Association Courts, Colombo, Sri Lanka
26 July 2023
Clay

Iran
3

			1	2	3
1	(Vietnam) (Iran)	Nguyễn Văn Phương; Hamidreza Nadaf	1; 6	4; 6
2	(Vietnam) (Iran)	Vũ Hà Minh Đức; Sina Moghimi	1; 6	1; 6
3	(Vietnam) (Iran)	Nguyễn Đắc Tiến / Phạm Minh Tuấn; Samyar Elyasi / Ali Yazdani	6; 2	5; 7	1; 6

==== Saudi Arabia vs. Sri Lanka ====
Saudi Arabia
2
Sri Lanka Tennis Association Courts, Colombo, Sri Lanka
26 July 2023
Clay

Sri Lanka
1

			1	2	3
1	(Saudi Arabia) (Sri Lanka)	Saud Alhogbani; Thehan Sanjaya Wijemanne	7; 5	6; 0
2	(Saudi Arabia) (Sri Lanka)	Ammar Alhaqbani; Chathurya Nilaweera	6; 3	6; 1
3	(Saudi Arabia) (Sri Lanka)	Omar Ahmed / Abdullah Alfaraj; Dhillon Herath / Thehan Sanjaya Wijemanne	3; 6	7^{8} 6^{6}	2; 6

==== Vietnam vs. Sri Lanka ====
Vietnam
2
Sri Lanka Tennis Association Courts, Colombo, Sri Lanka
27 July 2023
Clay

Sri Lanka
1

			1	2	3
1	(Vietnam) (Sri Lanka)	Nguyễn Văn Phương; Ashen Silva	7; 5	6; 2
2	(Vietnam) (Sri Lanka)	Vũ Hà Minh Đức; Chathurya Nilaweera	6; 4	7; 5
3	(Vietnam) (Sri Lanka)	Nguyễn Đắc Tiến / Phạm Minh Tuấn; Dhillon Herath / Thehan Sanjaya Wijemanne	6; 3	6^{5} 7^{7}	4; 6

==== Saudi Arabia vs. Iran ====
Saudi Arabia
1
Sri Lanka Tennis Association Courts, Colombo, Sri Lanka
27 July 2023
Clay

Iran
2

			1	2	3
1	(Saudi Arabia) (Iran)	Saud Alhogbani; Hamidreza Nadaf	4; 6	6; 1	6; 2
2	(Saudi Arabia) (Iran)	Ammar Alhaqbani; Sina Moghimi	2; 6	4; 6
3	(Saudi Arabia) (Iran)	Ammar Alhaqbani / Abdulmajeed Bukhari; Samyar Elyasi / Ali Yazdani	3; 6	5; 7

==== Vietnam vs. Saudi Arabia ====
Vietnam
2
Sri Lanka Tennis Association Courts, Colombo, Sri Lanka
28 July 2023
Clay

Saudi Arabia
1

			1	2	3
1	(Vietnam) (Saudi Arabia)	Nguyễn Văn Phương; Abdulmajeed Bukhari	6; 2	6; 3
2	(Vietnam) (Saudi Arabia)	Vũ Hà Minh Đức; Saud Alhogbani	4; 6	2; 6
3	(Vietnam) (Saudi Arabia)	Nguyễn Văn Phương / Phạm Minh Tuấn; Ammar Alhaqbani / Saud Alhogbani	6; 4	6; 0

==== Iran vs. Sri Lanka ====
Iran
3
Sri Lanka Tennis Association Courts, Colombo, Sri Lanka
28 July 2023
Clay

Sri Lanka
0

			1	2	3
1	(Iran) (Sri Lanka)	Ali Yazdani; Apna Perera	6; 0	6; 4
2	(Iran) (Sri Lanka)	Sina Moghimi; Ashen Silva	6; 0	6; 3
3	(Iran) (Sri Lanka)	Amir Hossein Badi / Samyar Elyasi; Dhillon Herath / Thehan Sanjaya Wijemanne	6; 4	7^{7} 6^{4}

=== Pool B ===
==== Pacific Oceania vs. Malaysia ====
Pacific Oceania
1
Sri Lanka Tennis Association Courts, Colombo, Sri Lanka
26 July 2023
Clay

Malaysia
2

			1	2	3
1	(Pacific Oceania) (Malaysia)	Clément Mainguy; Naufal Siddiq Kamaruzzaman	6^{4} 7^{7}	6; 4	4; 6
2	(Pacific Oceania) (Malaysia)	Colin Sinclair; Mitsuki Wei Kang Leong	6; 2	2; 6	6^{5} 7^{7}
3	(Pacific Oceania) (Malaysia)	Matavao Fanguna / Colin Sinclair; Christian Didier Chin / Darrshan Suresh Kumar	6; 4	6; 1

==== Jordan vs. Cambodia ====
Jordan
3
Sri Lanka Tennis Association Courts, Colombo, Sri Lanka
26 July 2023
Clay

Cambodia
0

			1	2	3
1	(Jordan) (Cambodia)	Mohammad Alkotop; Timothy Tep	6; 0	6; 4
2	(Jordan) (Cambodia)	Karam Hatamleh; Sarinreach Leng	7^{10} 6^{8}	6; 3
3	(Jordan) (Cambodia)	Mohammad Alkotop / Karam Hatamleh; Samneang Long / Timothy Tep	3; 6	6; 1	6; 2

==== Pacific Oceania vs. Cambodia ====
Pacific Oceania
3
Sri Lanka Tennis Association Courts, Colombo, Sri Lanka
27 July 2023
Clay

Cambodia
0

			1	2	3
1	(Pacific Oceania) (Cambodia)	Gillian Osmont; Khleang Ponlok	6; 0	6; 2
2	(Pacific Oceania) (Cambodia)	Colin Sinclair; Sarinreach Leng	7; 5	6; 2
3	(Pacific Oceania) (Cambodia)	Matavao Fanguna / Colin Sinclair; Khleang Ponlok / Samneang Long	6; 3	6; 2

==== Jordan vs. Malaysia ====
Jordan
2
Sri Lanka Tennis Association Courts, Colombo, Sri Lanka
27 July 2023
Clay

Malaysia
1

			1	2	3
1	(Jordan) (Malaysia)	Mohammad Alkotop; Christian Didier Chin	6; 4	6; 2
2	(Jordan) (Malaysia)	Karam Hatamleh; Mitsuki Wei Kang Leong	1; 6	4; 6
3	(Jordan) (Malaysia)	Mohammad Alkotop / Karam Hatamleh; Naufal Siddiq Kamaruzzaman / Mitsuki Wei Kang Leong	1; 6	6; 3	6; 1

==== Pacific Oceania vs. Jordan ====
Pacific Oceania
2
Sri Lanka Tennis Association Courts, Colombo, Sri Lanka
28 July 2023
Clay

Jordan
1

			1	2	3
1	(Pacific Oceania) (Jordan)	Clément Mainguy; Mohammad Alkotop	6^{3} 7^{7}	4; 6
2	(Pacific Oceania) (Jordan)	Colin Sinclair; Zaid Shelbaya	6; 1	6; 0
3	(Pacific Oceania) (Jordan)	Matavao Fanguna / Colin Sinclair; Mohammad Alkotop / Karam Hatamleh	6; 2	6^{5} 7^{7}	6; 3

==== Malaysia vs. Cambodia ====
Malaysia
3
Sri Lanka Tennis Association Courts, Colombo, Sri Lanka
28 July 2023
Clay

Cambodia
0

			1	2	3
1	(Malaysia) (Cambodia)	Naufal Siddiq Kamaruzzaman; Khleang Ponlok	6; 1	6; 1
2	(Malaysia) (Cambodia)	Mitsuki Wei Kang Leong; Timothy Tep	6; 3	6; 1
3	(Malaysia) (Cambodia)	Naufal Siddiq Kamaruzzaman / Mitsuki Wei Kang Leong; Sarinreach Leng / Timothy Tep	6; 3	6; 3

== Play-offs ==
=== First place play-off ===
==== Iran vs. Pacific Oceania ====
Iran
2
Sri Lanka Tennis Association Courts, Colombo, Sri Lanka
29 July 2023
Clay

Pacific Oceania
0

			1	2	3
1	(Iran) (Pacific Oceania)	Hamidreza Nadaf; Gillian Osmont	6; 2	6; 2
2	(Iran) (Pacific Oceania)	Sina Moghimi; Clément Mainguy	6; 2	6; 4
3	(Iran) (Pacific Oceania)	Samyar Elyasi / Ali Yazdani; Matavao Fanguna / Colin Sinclair				not played

=== Promotional play-off ===
==== Vietnam vs. Jordan ====
Vietnam
2
Sri Lanka Tennis Association Courts, Colombo, Sri Lanka
29 July 2023
Clay

Jordan
1

			1	2	3
1	(Vietnam) (Jordan)	Nguyễn Văn Phương; Mohammad Alkotop	1; 6	2; 6
2	(Vietnam) (Jordan)	Vũ Hà Minh Đức; Karam Hatamleh	6; 3	6; 1
3	(Vietnam) (Jordan)	Nguyễn Văn Phương / Phạm Minh Tuấn; Mohammad Alkotop / Karam Hatamleh	6; 2	6; 1

=== Relegation play-offs ===
==== Saudi Arabia vs. Cambodia ====
Saudi Arabia
3
Sri Lanka Tennis Association Courts, Colombo, Sri Lanka
29 July 2023
Clay

Cambodia
0

			1	2	3
1	(Saudi Arabia) (Cambodia)	Saud Alhogbani; Sarinreach Leng	6; 2	6; 3
2	(Saudi Arabia) (Cambodia)	Ammar Alhaqbani; Samneang Long	6; 0	6; 0
3	(Saudi Arabia) (Cambodia)	Abdullah Alfaraj / Ammar Alhaqbani; Sarinreach Leng / Timothy Tep	6; 0	6; 1

==== Sri Lanka vs. Malaysia ====
Sri Lanka
1
Sri Lanka Tennis Association Courts, Colombo, Sri Lanka
29 July 2023
Clay

Malaysia
2

			1	2	3
1	(Sri Lanka) (Malaysia)	Thehan Sanjaya Wijemanne; Naufal Siddiq Kamaruzzaman	6; 3	6; 3
2	(Sri Lanka) (Malaysia)	Chathurya Nilaweera; Mitsuki Wei Kang Leong	6^{5} 7^{7}	0; 6
3	(Sri Lanka) (Malaysia)	Dhillon Herath / Thehan Sanjaya Wijemanne; Christian Didier Chin / Mitsuki Wei Kang Leong	6^{5} 7^{7}	6^{6} 7^{8}

== Final placements ==
Placing	Teams	
Promoted/First	Iran	
Promoted/Second	Pacific Oceania	
Promoted/Third	Vietnam	
Fourth	Jordan	
Fifth	Malaysia	Saudi Arabia
Relegated/Seventh	Cambodia	Sri Lanka

- Iran, Pacific Oceania and Vietnam were promoted to 2024 Davis Cup World Group II play-offs.
- Cambodia and Sri Lanka were relegated to 2024 Davis Cup Asia/Oceania Zone Group IV.
