= 2013 Davis Cup Asia/Oceania Zone Group III =

International tennis competition

The Asia/Oceania Zone is one of the three zones of regional Davis Cup competition in 2013.

In the Asia/Oceania Zone there are four different groups in which teams compete against each other to advance to the next group.

== Teams ==
- Cambodia
- Hong Kong
- Iran
- Malaysia
- Oman
- Pacific Oceania
- United Arab Emirates
- Vietnam

== Draw ==
The eight teams will be split into two pools of four, the top two nations will advance to the promotion pool. The two best teams from there will be promoted to Group II for 2014. The bottom two teams will play in a relegation pool, where the two last teams will be relegated to Group IV for 2014.

It was played on the week commencing 9 September 2013 and it was played at the Aviation Tennis Club in Dubai, United Arab Emirates.

=== Pools ===
	Pool A	HKG	OMN	MAS	IRN
1	Hong Kong		2–1	3–0	2–1
2	Oman	1–2		1–2	1–2
3	Malaysia	0–3	2–1		2–1
4	Iran	1–2	2–1	1–2	

	Pool B	POC	UAE	VIE	CAM
1	Pacific Oceania		1–2	1–2	1–2
2	United Arab Emirates	2–1		0–3	1–2
3	Vietnam	2–1	3–0		3–0
4	Cambodia	2–1	2–1	0–3	

=== Play-offs ===
	Promotion	HKG	VIE	MAS	CAM
1	Hong Kong		1–2	3–0	2–1
2	Vietnam	2–1		1–2	3–0
3	Malaysia	0–3	2–1		3–0
4	Cambodia	1–2	0–3	0–3	

	Relegation	POC	UAE	OMN	IRN
1	Pacific Oceania		1–2	2–1	1–2
2	United Arab Emirates	2–1		3–0	0–3
3	Oman	1–2	0–3		1–2
4	Iran	2–1	3–0	2–1	

- Hong Kong and Vietnam promoted to Group II in 2014
- Pacific Oceania and Oman relegated to Group IV in 2014

== First round ==
=== Pool A ===
==== Hong Kong vs. Oman ====
Hong Kong
2
Aviation Club Tennis Centre, Dubai, United Arab Emirates
11 September 2013
Hard, Outdoor

Oman
1

			1	2	3
1	(Hong Kong) (Oman)	Ognian Kolev; Mohammed Al-Nabhani	6; 1	6; 3
2	(Hong Kong) (Oman)	Phillip King; Khalid Al-Nabhani	6; 0	6; 2
3	(Hong Kong) (Oman)	Lam Siu-chuen / Li Hei-yin; Khalid Al-Nabhani / Mohammed Al-Nabhani	4; 6	1; 6

==== Malaysia vs. Iran ====
Malaysia
2
Aviation Club Tennis Centre, Dubai, United Arab Emirates
11 September 2013
Hard, Outdoor

Iran
1

			1	2	3
1	(Malaysia) (Iran)	Syed Mohd Agil Syed Naguib; Anoosha Shahgholi	6; 3	3; 6	3; 6
2	(Malaysia) (Iran)	Mohd Assri Merzuki; Shahin Khaledan	1; 6	7^{7} 6^{4}	6; 4
3	(Malaysia) (Iran)	Syed Mohd Agil Syed Naguib / Si Yew Ming; Anoosha Shahgholi / Ashkan Shokoofi	6^{0} 7^{7}	6; 3	6; 4

==== Hong Kong vs. Malaysia ====
Hong Kong
3
Aviation Club Tennis Centre, Dubai, United Arab Emirates
12 September 2013
Hard, Outdoor

Malaysia
0

			1	2	3
1	(Hong Kong) (Malaysia)	Ognian Kolev; Muhammad Zainal Abidin	6; 3	6; 4
2	(Hong Kong) (Malaysia)	Phillip King; Mohd Assri Merzuki	6; 0	6; 4
3	(Hong Kong) (Malaysia)	Phillip King / Ognian Kolev; Syed Mohd Agil Syed Naguib / Si Yew Ming	6; 3	3; 6	6; 2

==== Oman vs. Iran ====
Oman
1
Aviation Club Tennis Centre, Dubai, United Arab Emirates
12 September 2013
Hard, Outdoor

Iran
2

			1	2	3
1	(Oman) (Iran)	Mohammed Al-Nabhani; Ashkan Shokoofi	3; 6	2; 6
2	(Oman) (Iran)	Khalid Al-Nabhani; Anoosha Shahgholi	3; 6	3; 6
3	(Oman) (Iran)	Khalid Al-Nabhani / Mohammed Al-Nabhani; Ashkan Shokoofi / Farshad Talavar	6; 3	6^{4} 7^{7}	7; 5

==== Hong Kong vs. Iran ====
Hong Kong
2
Aviation Club Tennis Centre, Dubai, United Arab Emirates
13 September 2013
Hard, Outdoor

Iran
1

			1	2	3
1	(Hong Kong) (Iran)	Li Hei-yin; Ashkan Shokoofi	3; 6	3; 6
2	(Hong Kong) (Iran)	Phillip King; Shahin Khaledan	6; 1	7^{7} 6^{4}
3	(Hong Kong) (Iran)	Phillip King / Ognian Kolev; Anoosha Shahgholi / Ashkan Shokoofi	6; 2	6; 3

==== Malaysia vs. Oman ====
Malaysia
2
Aviation Club Tennis Centre, Dubai, United Arab Emirates
13 September 2013
Hard, Outdoor

Oman
1

			1	2	3
1	(Malaysia) (Oman)	Si Yew Ming; Mohammed Al-Nabhani	3; 6	2; 6
2	(Malaysia) (Oman)	Mohd Assri Merzuki; Khalid Al-Nabhani	6; 4	7^{7} 6^{5}
3	(Malaysia) (Oman)	Mohd Assri Merzuki / Syed Mohd Agil Syed Naguib; Khalid Al-Nabhani / Mohammed Al-Nabhani	6; 4	3; 6	6; 1

=== Pool B ===
==== Vietnam vs. Cambodia ====
Vietnam
3
Aviation Club Tennis Centre, Dubai, United Arab Emirates
11 September 2013
Hard, Outdoor

Cambodia
0

			1	2	3
1	(Vietnam) (Cambodia)	Nguyễn Hoàng Thiên; Phalkun Mam	6; 3	6; 4
2	(Vietnam) (Cambodia)	Đỗ Minh Quân; Kenny Bun	6; 2	7; 5
3	(Vietnam) (Cambodia)	Lê Quốc Khánh / Phạm Minh Tuấn; Pannhara Mam / Phalkun Mam	6; 2	6; 2

==== Pacific Oceania vs. United Arab Emirates ====
Pacific Oceania
1
Aviation Club Tennis Centre, Dubai, United Arab Emirates
11 September 2013
Hard, Outdoor

United Arab Emirates
2

			1	2	3
1	(Pacific Oceania) (United Arab Emirates)	William O'Connell; Mahmoud Nader Al Blooshi	4; 6	6; 3	3; 6
2	(Pacific Oceania) (United Arab Emirates)	Gilles de Gouy; Omar Alawadhi	3; 6	3; 6
3	(Pacific Oceania) (United Arab Emirates)	Brett Baudinet / Daniel Llarenas; Soud Al Ali / Hamad Abbas Janahi	6; 4	2; 6	7^{10} 6^{8}

==== Pacific Oceania vs. Vietnam ====
Pacific Oceania
1
Aviation Club Tennis Centre, Dubai, United Arab Emirates
12 September 2013
Hard, Outdoor

Vietnam
2

			1	2	3
1	(Pacific Oceania) (Vietnam)	William O'Connell; Nguyễn Hoàng Thiên	2; 6	1; 6
2	(Pacific Oceania) (Vietnam)	Gilles de Gouy; Đỗ Minh Quân	2; 6	4; 6
3	(Pacific Oceania) (Vietnam)	Brett Baudinet / Daniel Llarenas; Lê Quốc Khánh / Phạm Minh Tuấn	6; 2	6; 4

==== United Arab Emirates vs. Cambodia ====
United Arab Emirates
1
Aviation Club Tennis Centre, Dubai, United Arab Emirates
12 September 2013
Hard, Outdoor

Cambodia
2

			1	2	3
1	(United Arab Emirates) (Cambodia)	Hamad Abbas Janahi; Pannhara Mam	4; 6	7; 5	6; 0
2	(United Arab Emirates) (Cambodia)	Omar Alawadhi; Kenny Bun	6; 4	4; 6	3; 6
3	(United Arab Emirates) (Cambodia)	Omar Alawadhi / Hamad Abbas Janahi; Kenny Bun / Phalkun Mam	3; 6	6^{3} 7^{7}

==== Pacific Oceania vs. Cambodia ====
Pacific Oceania
1
Aviation Club Tennis Centre, Dubai, United Arab Emirates
13 September 2013
Hard, Outdoor

Cambodia
2

			1	2	3
1	(Pacific Oceania) (Cambodia)	William O'Connell; Pannhara Mam	1; 6	2; 6
2	(Pacific Oceania) (Cambodia)	Gilles de Gouy; Kenny Bun	5; 7	6; 4	0; 6
3	(Pacific Oceania) (Cambodia)	Brett Baudinet / Daniel Llarenas; Pannhara Mam / Phalkun Mam	6; 1	6; 3

==== Vietnam vs. United Arab Emirates ====
Vietnam
3
Aviation Club Tennis Centre, Dubai, United Arab Emirates
13 September 2013
Hard, Outdoor

United Arab Emirates
0

			1	2	3
1	(Vietnam) (United Arab Emirates)	Nguyễn Hoàng Thiên; Hamad Abbas Janahi	6; 4	6; 4
2	(Vietnam) (United Arab Emirates)	Đỗ Minh Quân; Omar Alawadhi	7^{7} 6^{5}	7; 5
3	(Vietnam) (United Arab Emirates)	Lê Quốc Khánh / Phạm Minh Tuấn; Mahmoud Nader Al Blooshi / Hamad Abbas Janahi	6; 3	6; 4

== Second round ==
=== Promotion pool ===
==== Cambodia vs. Hong Kong ====
Cambodia
1
Aviation Club Tennis Centre, Dubai, United Arab Emirates
14 September 2013
Hard, Outdoor

Hong Kong
2

			1	2	3
1	(Cambodia) (Hong Kong)	Pannhara Mam; Ognian Kolev	4; 6	6; 4	4; 6
2	(Cambodia) (Hong Kong)	Kenny Bun; Phillip King	1; 6	3; 6
3	(Cambodia) (Hong Kong)	Kenny Bun / Phalkun Mam; Lam Siu-chuen / Li Hei-yin	5; 7	6; 2	6; 2

==== Vietnam vs. Malaysia ====
Vietnam
1
Aviation Club Tennis Centre, Dubai, United Arab Emirates
14 September 2013
Hard, Outdoor

Malaysia
2

			1	2	3
1	(Vietnam) (Malaysia)	Nguyễn Hoàng Thiên; Syed Mohd Agil Syed Naguib	6; 3	3; 6	2; 6
2	(Vietnam) (Malaysia)	Đỗ Minh Quân; Mohd Assri Merzuki	6; 4	4; 6	6; 4
3	(Vietnam) (Malaysia)	Đỗ Minh Quân / Lê Quốc Khánh; Mohd Assri Merzuki / Syed Mohd Agil Syed Naguib	6; 1	3; 6	4; 6

==== Cambodia vs. Malaysia ====
Cambodia
0
Aviation Club Tennis Centre, Dubai, United Arab Emirates
15 September 2013
Hard, Outdoor

Malaysia
3

			1	2	3
1	(Cambodia) (Malaysia)	Phalkun Mam; Muhammad Zainal Abidin	6; 1	4; 6	6^{3} 7^{7}
2	(Cambodia) (Malaysia)	Pannhara Mam; Mohd Assri Merzuki	6; 3	2; 6	2; 6
3	(Cambodia) (Malaysia)	Kenny Bun / Phalkun Mam; Syed Mohd Agil Syed Naguib / Si Yew Ming	3; 6	6; 3	4; 6

==== Vietnam vs. Hong Kong ====
Vietnam
2
Aviation Club Tennis Centre, Dubai, United Arab Emirates
15 September 2013
Hard, Outdoor

Hong Kong
1

			1	2	3
1	(Vietnam) (Hong Kong)	Nguyễn Hoàng Thiên; Ognian Kolev	3; 6	6; 3	1; 6
2	(Vietnam) (Hong Kong)	Phạm Minh Tuấn; Phillip King	2; 6	6; 0	6; 0
3	(Vietnam) (Hong Kong)	Đỗ Minh Quân / Lê Quốc Khánh; Lam Siu-chuen / Li Hei-yin	6; 1	6; 3

=== Relegation pool ===
==== Iran vs. Pacific Oceania ====
Iran
2
Aviation Club Tennis Centre, Dubai, United Arab Emirates
14 September 2013
Hard, Outdoor

Pacific Oceania
1

			1	2	3
1	(Iran) (Pacific Oceania)	Anoosha Shahgholi; Daniel Llarenas	6; 0	7; 5
2	(Iran) (Pacific Oceania)	Shahin Khaledan; William O'Connell	6; 3	7; 5
3	(Iran) (Pacific Oceania)	Ashkan Shokoofi / Farshad Talavar; Brett Baudinet / Daniel Llarenas	6^{2} 7^{7}	6; 3	3; 6

==== Oman vs. United Arab Emirates ====
Oman
0
Aviation Club Tennis Centre, Dubai, United Arab Emirates
14 September 2013
Hard, Outdoor

United Arab Emirates
3

			1	2	3
1	(Oman) (United Arab Emirates)	Mohammed Al-Nabhani; Hamad Abbas Janahi	6^{9} 7^{11}	6; 4	2; 6
2	(Oman) (United Arab Emirates)	Khalid Al-Nabhani; Omar Alawadhi	3; 6	1; 6
3	(Oman) (United Arab Emirates)	Khalid Al-Nabhani / Mudrik Al-Rawahi; Soud Al Ali / Hamad Abbas Janahi	3; 6	4; 6

==== Iran vs. United Arab Emirates ====
Iran
3
Aviation Club Tennis Centre, Dubai, United Arab Emirates
15 September 2013
Hard, Outdoor

United Arab Emirates
0

			1	2	3
1	(Iran) (United Arab Emirates)	Anoosha Shahgholi; Soud Al Ali	6; 2	6; 1
2	(Iran) (United Arab Emirates)	Shahin Khaledan; Hamad Abbas Janahi	6; 3	6; 3
3	(Iran) (United Arab Emirates)	Ashkan Shokoofi / Farshad Talavar; Soud Al Ali / Hamad Abbas Janahi	6; 4	6; 3

==== Oman vs. Pacific Oceania ====
Oman
1
Aviation Club Tennis Centre, Dubai, United Arab Emirates
15 September 2013
Hard, Outdoor

Pacific Oceania
2

			1	2	3
1	(Oman) (Pacific Oceania)	Mudrik Al-Rawahi; Daniel Llarenas	4; 6	1; 6
2	(Oman) (Pacific Oceania)	Khalid Al-Nabhani; William O'Connell	4; 6	6; 3	6; 1
3	(Oman) (Pacific Oceania)	Khalid Al-Nabhani / Mudrik Al-Rawahi; Brett Baudinet / Daniel Llarenas	4; 6	2; 6
