= 2025 Davis Cup Asia/Oceania Zone Group III =

Davis Cup competition in 2025

The Asia/Oceania Zone was the unique zone within Group 3 of the regional Davis Cup competition in 2025. The zone's competition was held in round robin format in Bắc Ninh, Vietnam, from 14 to 19 July 2025.

== Participating nations ==
- Cambodia
- Indonesia
- Jordan
- Saudi Arabia
- Singapore
- Sri Lanka
- Syria
- Thailand
- Vietnam
- ~~Iran~~ (Withdrew)

== Draw ==
Date: 14–19 July 2024

Location: Hanaka Paris Ocean Park, Bắc Ninh, Vietnam (Hard)

Format: Round-robin basis. One pool of four teams and one pool of five teams. Nations will play each team once in their group. The two pool winners will automatically be promoted to the World Group II Play-offs in 2026. They will be joined by the winner of a promotion play-off between the two teams finishing in second place in each pool.

Nations finishing fourth in each group will enter relegation play-off and the loser will be relegated to Asia/Oceania Zone Group IV in 2026. They will be joined by the nation finishing fifth in Pool B.

=== Seeding ===
Pot	Nation	Rank^{1}	Seed
1	Thailand	70	1
1	Indonesia	71	2
2	Saudi Arabia	75	3
2	Syria	78=	4
3	Jordan	80	5
3	Vietnam	83	6
4	Singapore	89	7
4	Sri Lanka	93	8
5	Cambodia	94	9

- ^{1}Davis Cup Rankings as of 3 February 2025

=== Round Robin ===
==== Pool A ====
		THA	KSA	SGP	VIE	RR; W–L	Match; W–L	Set; W–L	Standings
1	Thailand		3–0	3–0	3–0	3–0	9–0 (100%)	– (%)	1
3	Saudi Arabia	0–3		2–1	2–1	2–1	4–5 (44%)	– (%)	2
7	Singapore	0–3	1–2		3–0	1–2	4–5 (44%)	– (%)	3
6	Vietnam	0–3	1–2	0–3		0–3	1–8 (11%)	– (%)	4

==== Pool B ====
		INA	SYR	JOR	SRI	CAM	RR; W–L	Set; W–L	Game; W–L	Standings
2	Indonesia		2–1	2–1	3–0	3–0	4–0	10–2 (83%)	– (%)	1
4	Syria	1–2		2–1	3–0	3–0	3–1	9–3 (75%)	– (%)	2
5	Jordan	1–2	1–2		3–0	3–0	2–2	8–4 (67%)	– (%)	3
8	Sri Lanka	0–3	0–3	0–3		2–1	1–3	2–10 (17%)	– (%)	4
9	Cambodia	0–3	0–3	0–3	1–2		0–4	1–11 (8%)	– (%)	5

Standings are determined by: 1. number of wins; 2. number of matches; 3. in two-team ties, head-to-head records; 4. in three-team ties, (a) percentage of sets won (head-to-head records if two teams remain tied), then (b) percentage of games won (head-to-head records if two teams remain tied), then (c) Davis Cup rankings.

=== Playoffs ===
Placing	A Team	Score	B Team
First	Thailand	2–0	Indonesia
Promotional	Saudi Arabia	1–2	Syria
Fifth	Singapore	2–1	Jordan
Seventh	Vietnam	2–1	Sri Lanka
Relegated			Cambodia

- Thailand, Indonesia and Syria were promoted to 2026 Davis Cup World Group II play-offs.
- Sri Lanka and Cambodia were relegated to 2026 Davis Cup Asia/Oceania Zone Group IV.

== Round Robin ==
=== Pool A ===
==== Thailand vs. Vietnam ====
Thailand
3
Hanaka Paris Ocean Park, Bắc Ninh, Vietnam
14 July 2025
Hard

Vietnam
0

			1	2	3
1	(Thailand) (Vietnam)	Pawit Sornlaksup; Nguyễn Văn Phương	6; 2	2; 0		retired
2	(Thailand) (Vietnam)	Maximus Jones; Vũ Hà Minh Đức	6; 2	6; 3
3	(Thailand) (Vietnam)	Thanapet Chanta / Pruchya Isaro; Đinh Viết Tuấn Minh / Nguyễn Minh Phát	6; 2	6; 4

==== Saudi Arabia vs. Singapore ====
Saudi Arabia
2
Hanaka Paris Ocean Park, Bắc Ninh, Vietnam
14–15 July 2025
Hard

Singapore
1

			1	2	3
1	(Saudi Arabia) (Singapore)	Saud Alhogbani; Bill Chan	6; 4	2; 6	3; 6
2	(Saudi Arabia) (Singapore)	Ammar Faleh Alhogbani; Shaheed Alam	3; 6	7^{7} 6^{5}	6; 2
3	(Saudi Arabia) (Singapore)	Saud Alhogbani / Abdulmajeed Bukhari; Bill Chan / Jerall Yasin	6; 2	6; 3

==== Thailand vs. Singapore ====
Thailand
3
Hanaka Paris Ocean Park, Bắc Ninh, Vietnam
16 July 2025
Hard

Singapore
0

			1	2	3
1	(Thailand) (Singapore)	Maximus Jones; Bill Chan	5; 7	6; 2	7^{7} 6^{5}
2	(Thailand) (Singapore)	Kasidit Samrej; Shaheed Alam	6; 4	6; 2
3	(Thailand) (Singapore)	Pruchya Isaro / Pawit Sornlaksup; Daniel Abadia / Michael Dylan Jimenez	6; 2	6; 2

==== Saudi Arabia vs. Vietnam ====
Saudi Arabia
2
Hanaka Paris Ocean Park, Bắc Ninh, Vietnam
16 July 2025
Hard

Vietnam
1

			1	2	3
1	(Saudi Arabia) (Vietnam)	Saud Alhogbani; Phạm La Hoàng Anh	6; 4	6; 1
2	(Saudi Arabia) (Vietnam)	Ammar Faleh Alhogbani; Vũ Hà Minh Đức	6^{5} 7^{7}	6; 3	6; 1
3	(Saudi Arabia) (Vietnam)	Abdulmajeed Bukhari / Bader Idrees; Đinh Viết Tuấn Minh / Nguyễn Văn Phương	7^{7} 6^{5}	5; 7	6^{2} 7^{7}

==== Thailand vs. Saudi Arabia ====
Thailand
3
Hanaka Paris Ocean Park, Bắc Ninh, Vietnam
17 July 2025
Hard

Saudi Arabia
0

			1	2	3
1	(Thailand) (Saudi Arabia)	Pawit Sornlaksup; Bader Idrees	6; 0	6; 0
2	(Thailand) (Saudi Arabia)	Kasidit Samrej; Abdulmajeed Bukhari	6; 2	6; 1
3	(Thailand) (Saudi Arabia)	Pruchya Isaro / Maximus Jones; Abdulmajeed Bukhari / Bader Idrees	2; 1			retired

==== Vietnam vs. Singapore ====
Vietnam
0
Hanaka Paris Ocean Park, Bắc Ninh, Vietnam
17 July 2025
Hard

Singapore
3

			1	2	3
1	(Vietnam) (Singapore)	Phạm La Hoàng Anh; Bill Chan	3; 6	4; 6
2	(Vietnam) (Singapore)	Vũ Hà Minh Đức; Shaheed Alam	6; 4	6^{6} 7^{8}	2; 6
3	(Vietnam) (Singapore)	Đinh Viết Tuấn Minh / Nguyễn Minh Phát; Michael Dylan Jimenez / Jerall Yasin	4; 6	6; 3	3; 6

=== Pool B ===
==== Indonesia vs. Cambodia ====
Indonesia
3
Hanaka Paris Ocean Park, Bắc Ninh, Vietnam
14 July 2025
Hard

Cambodia
0

			1	2	3
1	(Indonesia) (Cambodia)	Anthony Susanto; Poev Vireak	6; 0	6; 0
2	(Indonesia) (Cambodia)	M Rifqi Fitriadi; Sothoeun Yoeun	6; 0	6; 0
3	(Indonesia) (Cambodia)	Lucky Candra Kurniawan / Christopher Rungkat; Rafaelis De Spiegeleer / Poev Vireak	6; 1	6; 1

==== Syria vs. Sri Lanka ====
Syria
3
Hanaka Paris Ocean Park, Bắc Ninh, Vietnam
14 July 2025
Hard

Sri Lanka
0

			1	2	3
1	(Syria) (Sri Lanka)	Yacoeb Makzoume; Harshana Godamanna	2; 6	6; 4	7^{7} 6^{2}
2	(Syria) (Sri Lanka)	Taym Alazmeh; Apna Perera	6; 2	4; 6	6; 2
3	(Syria) (Sri Lanka)	Hazem Naw / Rabee Saleem; Chathurya Nilaweera / Ashen Silva	6; 0	6; 4

==== Indonesia vs. Sri Lanka ====
Indonesia
3
Hanaka Paris Ocean Park, Bắc Ninh, Vietnam
15 July 2025
Hard

Sri Lanka
0

			1	2	3
1	(Indonesia) (Sri Lanka)	Nathan Anthony Barki; Ashen Silva	4; 6	7; 5	6; 2
2	(Indonesia) (Sri Lanka)	M Rifqi Fitriadi; Apna Perera	6; 0	6; 1
3	(Indonesia) (Sri Lanka)	Christopher Rungkat / Anthony Susanto; Harshana Godamanna / Chathurya Nilaweera	6; 1	6; 4

==== Syria vs. Jordan ====
Syria
2
Hanaka Paris Ocean Park, Bắc Ninh, Vietnam
15 July 2025
Hard

Jordan
1

			1	2	3
1	(Syria) (Jordan)	Taym Alazmeh; Mohammad Alkotop	6; 1	6; 3
2	(Syria) (Jordan)	Hazem Naw; Zaid Al-Mashni	6^{2} 7^{7}	6; 4	7; 5
3	(Syria) (Jordan)	Yacoub Makzoume / Rabee Saleem; Mohammad Alkotop / Mousa Alkotop	5; 7	6; 3	1; 6

==== Syria vs. Cambodia ====
Syria
3
Hanaka Paris Ocean Park, Bắc Ninh, Vietnam
16 July 2025
Hard

Cambodia
0

			1	2	3
1	(Syria) (Cambodia)	Rabee Saleem; Rafaelis De Spiegeleer	6; 1	6; 0
2	(Syria) (Cambodia)	Hazem Naw; Sothoeun Yoeun	7^{7} 6^{1}	6; 3
3	(Syria) (Cambodia)	Taym Alazmeh / Yacoub Makzoume; Poev Vireak / Sothoeun Yoeun	6; 0	6; 0

==== Jordan vs. Sri Lanka ====
Jordan
3
Hanaka Paris Ocean Park, Bắc Ninh, Vietnam
16 July 2025
Hard

Sri Lanka
0

			1	2	3
1	(Jordan) (Sri Lanka)	Mohammad Alkotop; Ashen Silva	6; 3	3; 6	6; 4
2	(Jordan) (Sri Lanka)	Mousa Alkotop; Apna Perera	6; 3	6; 0
3	(Jordan) (Sri Lanka)	Mousa Alkotop / Malek El-Qurneh; Harshana Godamanna / Chathurya Nilaweera	6; 3	7^{7} 6^{2}

==== Indonesia vs. Jordan ====
Indonesia
2
Hanaka Paris Ocean Park, Bắc Ninh, Vietnam
17 July 2025
Hard

Jordan
1

			1	2	3
1	(Indonesia) (Jordan)	Nathan Anthony Barki; Mohammad Alkotop	6; 4	4; 6	2; 6
2	(Indonesia) (Jordan)	M Rifqi Fitriadi; Mousa Alkotop	7^{7} 6^{5}	6; 3
3	(Indonesia) (Jordan)	M Rifqi Fitriadi / Christopher Rungkat; Mohammad Alkotop / Mousa Alkotop	7; 5	6; 3

==== Sri Lanka vs. Cambodia ====
Sri Lanka
2
Hanaka Paris Ocean Park, Bắc Ninh, Vietnam
17 July 2025
Hard

Cambodia
1

			1	2	3
1	(Sri Lanka) (Cambodia)	Ashen Silva; Poev Vireak	6; 0	6; 0
2	(Sri Lanka) (Cambodia)	Harshana Godamanna; Sothoeun Yoeun	6; 2	6; 2
3	(Sri Lanka) (Cambodia)	Chathurya Nilaweera / Apna Perera; Rafaelis De Spiegeleer / Sothoeun Yoeun	5; 1			retired

==== Indonesia vs. Syria ====
Indonesia
2
Hanaka Paris Ocean Park, Bắc Ninh, Vietnam
18 July 2025
Hard

Syria
1

			1	2	3
1	(Indonesia) (Syria)	Nathan Anthony Barki; Taym Alazmeh	1; 6	3; 6
2	(Indonesia) (Syria)	M Rifqi Fitriadi; Hazem Naw	6; 1	6; 1
3	(Indonesia) (Syria)	M Rifqi Fitriadi / Christopher Rungkat; Taym Alazmeh / Rabee Saleem	4; 6	6; 3	6; 2

==== Jordan vs. Cambodia ====
Jordan
3
Hanaka Paris Ocean Park, Bắc Ninh, Vietnam
18 July 2025
Hard

Cambodia
0

			1	2	3
1	(Jordan) (Cambodia)	Malek El-Qurneh; Rafaelis De Spiegeleer	6; 0	6; 1
2	(Jordan) (Cambodia)	Zaid Al-Mashni; Sothoeun Yoeun	6; 1	6; 1
3	(Jordan) (Cambodia)	Zaid Al-Mashni / Karam Hatamleh; Rafaelis De Spiegeleer / Sothoeun Yoeun	6; 0	7^{7} 6^{4}

== Play-offs ==
=== First place play-off ===
==== Thailand vs. Indonesia ====
Thailand
2
Hanaka Paris Ocean Park, Bắc Ninh, Vietnam
19 July 2025
Hard

Indonesia
0

			1	2	3
1	(Thailand) (Indonesia)	Pawit Sornlaksup; Lucky Candra Kurniawan	6; 2	6; 2
2	(Thailand) (Indonesia)	Kasidit Samrej; Nathan Anthony Barki	7^{7} 6^{5}	6^{9} 7^{11}	7^{7} 6^{2}
3	(Thailand) (Indonesia)	Pruchya Isaro / Maximus Jones; Lucky Candra Kurniawan / Anthony Susanto				not played

=== Promotional play-off ===
==== Saudi Arabia vs. Syria ====
Saudi Arabia
1
Hanaka Paris Ocean Park, Bắc Ninh, Vietnam
19 July 2025
Hard

Syria
2

			1	2	3
1	(Saudi Arabia) (Syria)	Saud Alhogbani; Taym Alazmeh	7^{7} 6^{2}	6; 2
2	(Saudi Arabia) (Syria)	Ammar Faleh Alhogbani; Hazem Naw	7^{7} 6^{5}	4; 6	3; 6
3	(Saudi Arabia) (Syria)	Saud Alhogbani / Abdulmajeed Bukhari; Taym Alazmeh / Hazem Naw	3; 6	4; 6

=== Fifth place play-off ===
==== Singapore vs. Jordan ====
Singapore
2
Hanaka Paris Ocean Park, Bắc Ninh, Vietnam
19 July 2025
Hard

Jordan
1

			1	2	3
1	(Singapore) (Jordan)	Bill Chan; Mohammad Alkotop	1; 4			retired
2	(Singapore) (Jordan)	Shaheed Alam; Mousa Alkotop	5; 3			retired
3	(Singapore) (Jordan)	Shaheed Alam / Bill Chan; Zaid Al-Mashni / Malek El-Qurneh				retired

=== Relegation play-off ===
==== Vietnam vs. Sri Lanka ====
Vietnam
2
Hanaka Paris Ocean Park, Bắc Ninh, Vietnam
19 July 2025
Hard

Sri Lanka
1

			1	2	3
1	(Vietnam) (Sri Lanka)	Phạm La Hoàng Anh; Ashen Silva	6; 3	7; 5
2	(Vietnam) (Sri Lanka)	Vũ Hà Minh Đức; Harshana Godamanna	3; 6	2; 6
3	(Vietnam) (Sri Lanka)	Đinh Viết Tuấn Minh / Nguyễn Văn Phương; Harshana Godamanna / Chathurya Nilaweera	6; 2	6^{5} 7^{7}	6; 2

== Final placements ==
Placing	Teams
Promoted/First	Thailand
Promoted/Second	Indonesia
Promoted/Third	Syria
Fourth	Saudi Arabia
Fifth	Singapore
Sixth	Jordan
Seventh	Vietnam
Relegated/Eighth	Sri Lanka
Relegated/Ninth	Cambodia

- Thailand, Indonesia and Syria were promoted to 2026 Davis Cup World Group II play-offs.
- Sri Lanka and Cambodia were relegated to 2026 Davis Cup Asia/Oceania Zone Group IV.
