= 2016 Davis Cup =

2016 edition of the Davis Cup

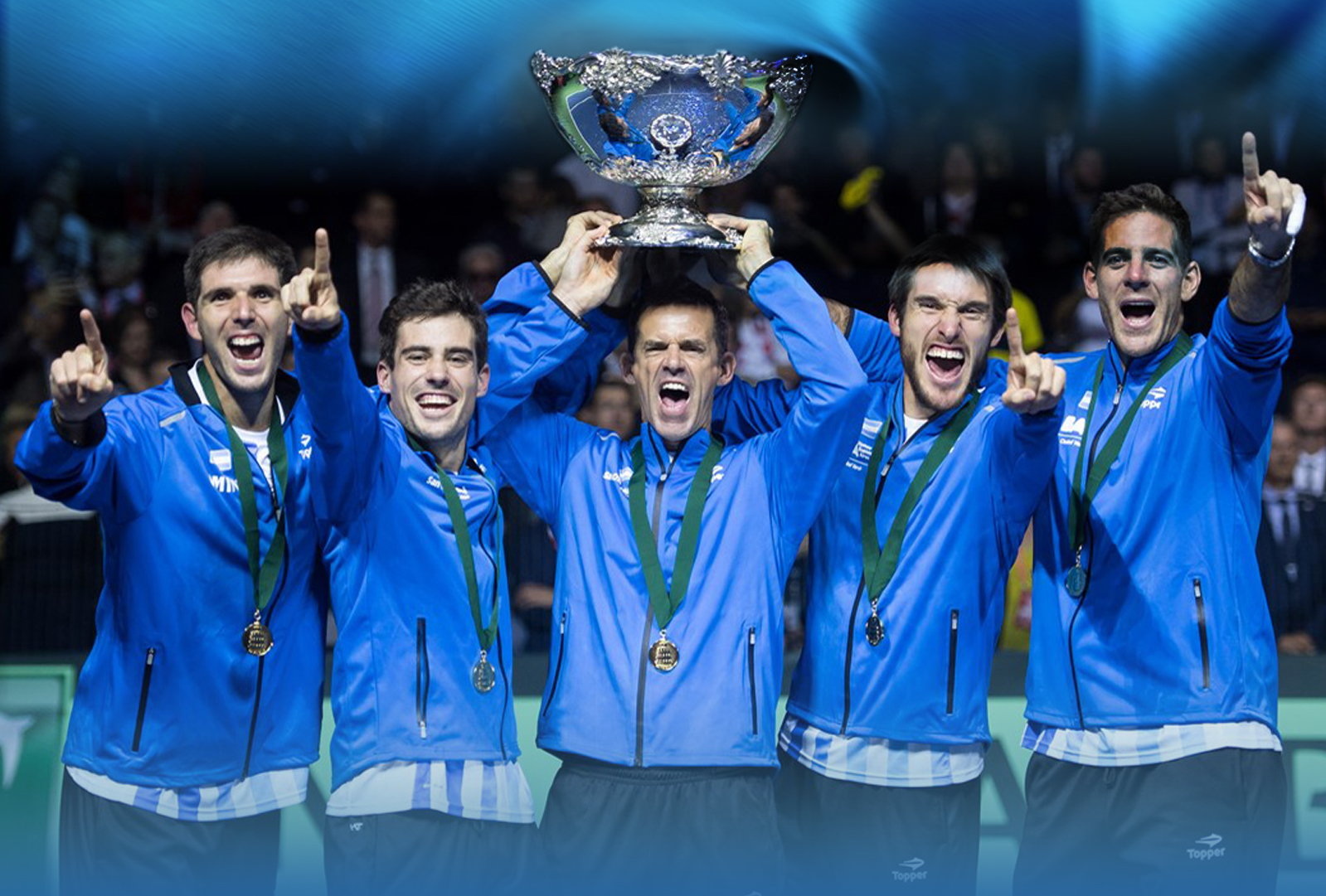
- Argentina won their first Davis Cup title

Details
- Duration: 2 March – 27 November 2016
- Edition: 105th

Champion
- Winning nation: Argentina

The 2016 Davis Cup was the 105th edition of the Davis Cup, a tournament between national teams in men's tennis. It was sponsored by BNP Paribas. From this season's tournament the deciding set of each match would be settled by a tiebreak at 6 games all rather than playing an advantage set until a player or a team were two games clear. Argentina won their first Davis Cup title, after 4 runner-up finishes, defeating Croatia in the final. Federico Delbonis defeated Ivo Karlović in the final match to give Argentina its first Davis Cup title, after a comeback from Juan Martín del Potro against Marin Čilić in the fourth match.

Kosovo made its first appearance in the tournament.

== World Group ==
Participating teams
Argentina	Australia	Belgium	Canada
Croatia	Czech Republic	France	Germany
Great Britain	Italy	Japan	Kazakhstan
Poland	Serbia	Switzerland	United States

=== Seeds ===
1. Great Britain (semifinals)
2. Belgium (first round)
3. Czech Republic (quarterfinals)
4. Switzerland (first round)
5. France (semifinals)
6. Argentina (champions)
7. Serbia (quarterfinals)
8. Australia (first round)

=== Draw ===
First round 4–6 March
Birmingham, Great Britain (indoor hard)
1	Great Britain	3
Japan	1
Belgrade, Serbia (indoor hard)
7	Serbia	3
Kazakhstan	2
Pesaro, Italy (indoor clay)
4	Switzerland	0
Italy	5
Gdańsk, Poland (indoor hard)
6	Argentina	3
Poland	2
Baie-Mahault, Guadeloupe, France (clay)
Canada	0
5	France	5
Hannover, Germany (indoor hard)
Germany	2
3	Czech Republic	3
Kooyong, Australia (grass)
United States	3
8	Australia	1
Liège, Belgium (indoor clay)
Croatia	3
2	Belgium	2

Quarterfinals; 15–17 July
Belgrade, Serbia (clay)
1	Great Britain	3
7	Serbia	2
Pesaro, Italy (clay)
Italy	1
6	Argentina	3
Třinec, Czech Republic (indoor hard)
5	France	3
3	Czech Republic	1
Portland, United States (hard)
United States	2
Croatia	3

Semifinals; 16–18 September
Glasgow, Great Britain (indoor hard)
1	Great Britain	2
6	Argentina	3
Zadar, Croatia (indoor hard)
5	France	2
Croatia	3

Final; 25–27 November
Zagreb, Croatia (indoor hard)
6	Argentina	3
Croatia	2

=== Final ===
Croatia
2
Arena Zagreb, Zagreb, Croatia
25–27 November 2016
Hard (i)

Argentina
3

			1	2	3	4	5
1	(Croatia) (Argentina)	Marin Čilić; Federico Delbonis	6; 3	7; 5	3; 6	1; 6	6; 2
2	(Croatia) (Argentina)	Ivo Karlović; Juan Martín del Potro	4; 6	7^{8} 6^{6}	3; 6	5; 7
3	(Croatia) (Argentina)	Marin Čilić / Ivan Dodig; Juan Martín del Potro / Leonardo Mayer	7^{7} 6^{2}	7^{7} 6^{4}	6; 3
4	(Croatia) (Argentina)	Marin Čilić; Juan Martín del Potro	7^{7} 6^{4}	6; 2	5; 7	4; 6	3; 6
5	(Croatia) (Argentina)	Ivo Karlović; Federico Delbonis	3; 6	4; 6	2; 6

== World Group play-offs ==
Date: 16–18 September

The eight losing teams in the World Group first round ties and eight winners of the Zonal Group I final round ties competed in the World Group play-offs for spots in the 2017 World Group.

Seeded teams

1. Switzerland
2. Belgium
3. Australia
4. Canada
5. Kazakhstan
6. Spain
7. Germany
8. Japan

Unseeded teams

- Brazil
- Chile
- India
- Poland
- Russia
- Slovakia
- Ukraine
- Uzbekistan

Home team	Score	Visiting team	Location	Venue	Door	Surface
Uzbekistan	2–3	Switzerland	Tashkent	Olympic Tennis School	Outdoor	Clay
Belgium	4–0	Brazil	Ostend	Sleuyter Arena	Indoor	Hard
Australia	3–0	Slovakia	Sydney	NSW Tennis Centre	Outdoor	Grass
Canada	5–0	Chile	Halifax	Scotiabank Centre	Indoor	Hard
Russia	3–1	Kazakhstan	Moscow	National Tennis Center	Outdoor	Hard
India	0–5	Spain	New Delhi	R.K. Khanna Tennis Complex	Outdoor	Hard
Germany	3–2	Poland	Berlin	Rot-Weiss Tennis Club	Outdoor	Clay
Japan	5–0	Ukraine	Osaka	Utsubo Tennis Center	Outdoor	Hard

- Australia, Belgium, Canada, Germany, Japan and Switzerland will remain in the World Group in 2017.
- Russia and Spain are promoted to the World Group in 2017.
- Brazil, Chile, India, Slovakia, Ukraine and Uzbekistan will remain in Zonal Group I in 2017.
- Kazakhstan and Poland are relegated to Zonal Group I in 2017.

== Americas Zone ==
=== Group I ===
Seeds: All seeds received a bye into the second round.

1. Brazil
2. Colombia

Remaining nations:

- Barbados
- Chile
- Dominican Republic
- Ecuador

==== Draw ====
Second Round Play-offs
Santo Domingo Este, Dominican Republic (hard)
Barbados	2
Dominican Republic	3

First Round Play-offs
bye
Barbados
Santiago de los Caballeros, Dominican Republic (clay)
Dominican Republic	1
2	Colombia	4

First Round
1	Brazil
bye
Portoviejo, Ecuador (clay)
Barbados	0
Ecuador	5
Santiago, Chile (clay)
Chile	5
Dominican Republic	0
bye
2	Colombia

Second Round
Belo Horizonte, Brazil (indoor hard)
1	Brazil	3
Ecuador	1
Iquique, Chile (clay)
Chile	3
2	Colombia	1

- Barbados relegated to Group II in 2017.
- Brazil and Chile advance to World Group Play-off.

=== Group II ===
Seeds:

1. Uruguay
2. Venezuela
3. Mexico
4. El Salvador

Remaining nations:

- Guatemala
- Paraguay
- Peru
- Puerto Rico

==== Draw ====
Play-offs
Guatemala City, Guatemala (hard)
1	Uruguay	1
Guatemala	4
Asunción, Paraguay (clay)
Puerto Rico	0
Paraguay	5

First Round
Lima, Peru (clay)
1	Uruguay	2
Peru	3
San Francisco de Campeche, MX (hard)
3	Mexico	3
Guatemala	2
Santa Tecla, El Salvador (hard)
Puerto Rico	2
4	El Salvador	3
Valencia, Venezuela (hard)
Paraguay	0
2	Venezuela	5

Second Round
Lima, Peru (clay)
Peru	4
3	Mexico	1
Santa Tecla, El Salvador (hard)
4	El Salvador	2
2	Venezuela	3

Third Round
Lima, Peru (clay)
Peru	3
2	Venezuela	2

- Uruguay and Puerto Rico relegated to Group III in 2017.
- Peru promoted to Group I in 2017.

=== Group III ===
Date: 11–16 July

Location: La Paz, Bolivia (clay)

Confirmed teams:

- Bahamas
- Bermuda
- Bolivia
- Costa Rica
- Cuba
- Honduras
- Jamaica
- Panama
- Trinidad and Tobago

Inactive teams:

- Antigua and Barbuda
- Aruba
- Eastern Caribbean
- Haiti
- Saint Lucia
- U.S. Virgin Islands

Format: Round-robin basis. Two pools of four and five teams, respectively (Pools A and B). The winner of each pool plays off against the runner-up of the other pool to determine which two nations are promoted to Americas Zone Group II in 2017.

Seeding: The seeding was based on the Davis Cup Rankings of 7 March 2016 (shown in parentheses below).

Pot 1	Pot 2	Pot 3	Pot 4
1. Bolivia (72); 2. Bahamas (78)	3. Honduras (85); 4. Jamaica (88)	5. Cuba (89); 6. Costa Rica (91)	7. Panama (102); 8. Bermuda (114); 9. Trinidad and Tobago (115)

Group A

	Bolivia	Jamaica	Cuba	Panama	RR W–L	Matches W–L	Sets W–L	Games W–L	Standings
Bolivia		3–0	3–0	3–0	3–0	9–0	18–0	109–35	1
Jamaica	0–3		3–0	3–0	2–1	6–3	12–7	93–59	2
Cuba	0–3	0–3		3–0	1–2	3–6	7–12	68–79	3
Panama	0–3	0–3	0–3		0–3	0–9	0–18	11–108	4

Group B

	Bahamas	Costa Rica	Honduras	Bermuda	Trinidad and Tobago	RR W–L	Matches W–L	Sets W–L	Games W–L	Standings
Bahamas		2–1	2–1	3–0	3–0	4–0	10–2	21–6	149–94	1
Costa Rica	1–2		2–1	2–1	3–0	3–1	8–4	19–11	164–133	2
Honduras	1–2	1–2		3–0	2–1	2–2	7–5	17–13	144–127	3
Bermuda	0–3	1–2	0–3		2−1	1–3	3–9	8–20	106–149	4
Trinidad and Tobago	0–3	0–3	1–2	1−2		0–4	2–10	6–21	87–147	5

Play-offs

Placing	A Team	Score	B Team
Promotional	Bolivia	2–0	Costa Rica
Promotional	Jamaica	0–2	Bahamas
5th–6th	Cuba	2–0	Honduras
7th–8th	Panama	0–3	Bermuda
9th	N/A	—	Trinidad and Tobago

Bolivia and Bahamas promoted to Group II in 2017.

== Asia/Oceania Zone ==
=== Group I ===
Seeds: All seeds received a bye into the second round.

1. India
2. Uzbekistan

Remaining nations:

- China
- New Zealand
- Pakistan
- South Korea

==== Draw ====
Second-round play-offs
Christchurch, New Zealand (indoor hard)
New Zealand	5
Pakistan	0

First-round play-offs
bye
New Zealand
Pakistan
bye

First Round
1	India
bye
Seoul, South Korea (hard)
New Zealand	1
South Korea	3
Colombo, Sri Lanka (clay)
Pakistan	0
China	5
bye
2	Uzbekistan

Second Round
Chandigarh, India (grass)
1	India	4
South Korea	1
Tashkent, Uzbekistan (clay)
China	2
2	Uzbekistan	3

- Pakistan relegated to Group II in 2017.
- India and Uzbekistan advance to World Group play-off.

=== Group II ===
Seeds:

1. Chinese Taipei
2. Thailand
3. Philippines
4. Indonesia

Remaining nations:

- Kuwait
- Malaysia
- Sri Lanka
- Vietnam

==== Draw ====
Play-offs
Mishref, Kuwait City (hard)
Malaysia	1
Kuwait	4
Surakarta, Indonesia (hard)
4	Indonesia	5
Sri Lanka	0

First Round
Kaohsiung, Taiwan (hard)
1	Chinese Taipei	4
Malaysia	1
Pasig, Philippines (indoor clay)
3	Philippines	5
Kuwait	0
Surakarta, Indonesia (hard)
Vietnam	3
4	Indonesia	2
Nonthaburi, Thailand (hard)
Sri Lanka	2
2	Thailand	3

Second Round
Manila, Philippines (indoor clay)
1	Chinese Taipei	3
3	Philippines	1
Nonthaburi, Thailand (hard)
Vietnam	0
Thailand	5

Third Round
Nonthaburi, Thailand (hard)
1	Chinese Taipei	3
2	Thailand	2

- Malaysia and Sri Lanka relegated to Group III in 2017.
- Chinese Taipei promoted to Group I in 2017.

=== Group III ===
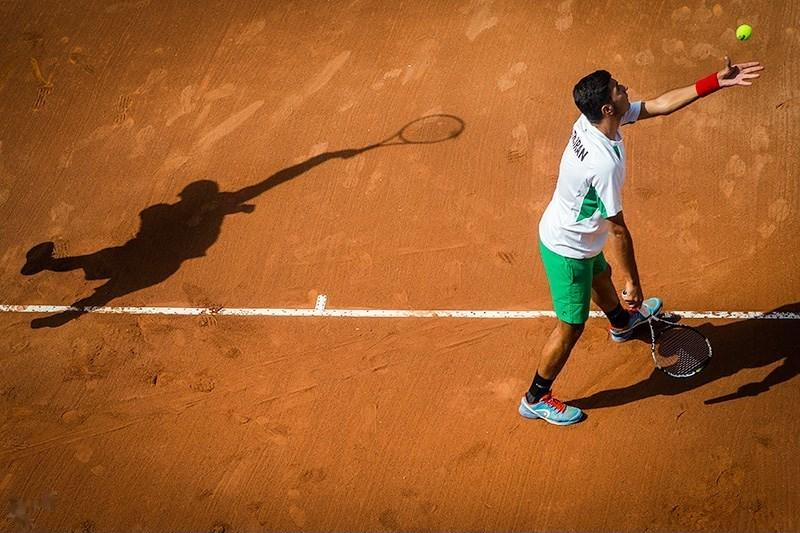
Davis cup in Tehran (15 July 2016)

Date: 11–16 July

Location: Tehran, Iran (clay)

Confirmed teams:

- Cambodia
- Hong Kong
- Iran
- Lebanon
- Pacific Oceania
- Qatar
- Singapore
- Syria
- Turkmenistan

Format: Round-robin basis. Two pools of four and five teams, respectively (Pools A and B). The winner of each pool plays off against the runner-up of the other pool to determine which two nations are promoted to Asia/Oceania Zone Group II in 2017.

Seeding: The seeding was based on the Davis Cup Rankings of 7 March 2016 (shown in parentheses below).

Pot 1	Pot 2	Pot 3	Pot 4
1. Iran (87); 2. Syria (90)	3. Lebanon (93); 4. Turkmenistan (95)	5. Hong Kong (96); 6. Cambodia (97)	7. Pacific Oceania (99); 8. Qatar (100); 9. Singapore (103)

Group A

	Iran	Hong Kong	Pacific Oceania	Turkmenistan	RR W–L	Matches W–L	Sets W–L	Games W–L	Standings
Iran		2–1	3–0	3–0	3–0	8–1	16–2	108–60	1
Hong Kong	1–2		3–0	2–1	2–1	6–3	13–7	107–78	2
Pacific Oceania	0–3	0–3		2–1	1–2	2–7	5–14	69–102	3
Turkmenistan	0–3	1–2	1–2		0–3	2–7	4–15	59–103	4

Group B

	Lebanon	Syria	Qatar	Cambodia	Singapore	RR W–L	Matches W–L	Sets W–L	Games W–L	Standings
Lebanon		3–0	3–0	3–0	3–0	4–0	12–0	24–1	153–79	1
Syria	0–3		2–1	3–0	3–0	3–1	8–4	17–11	149–125	2
Qatar	0–3	1–2		3–0	3–0	2–2	7–5	17–13	161–158	3
Cambodia	0–3	0–3	0–3		2–1	1–3	2–10	7–20	111–153	4
Singapore	0–3	0–3	0–3	1–2		0–4	1–11	3–23	97–156	5

Play-offs

Placing	A Team	Score	B Team
Promotional	Iran	2–1	Syria
Promotional	Hong Kong	2–1	Lebanon
5th	N/A	—	Qatar
Relegation	Pacific Oceania	3–0	Singapore
Relegation	Turkmenistan	2–1	Cambodia

Iran and Hong Kong promoted to Group II in 2017.

Singapore and Cambodia relegated to Group IV in 2017.

=== Group IV ===
Date: 13–16 July

Location: Amman, Jordan (clay)

Confirmed teams:

- Bahrain
- Iraq
- Jordan
- Mongolia
- Myanmar
- Oman
- Saudi Arabia
- Tajikistan
- United Arab Emirates

Inactive teams:

- Bangladesh
- Brunei
- Kyrgyzstan
- Yemen

Format: Round-robin basis. Two pools of four and five teams, respectively (Pools A and B). The winner of each pool plays off against the runner-up of the other pool to determine which two nations are promoted to Asia/Oceania Zone Group III in 2017.

Seeding: The seeding was based on the Davis Cup Rankings of 7 March 2016 (shown in parentheses below).

Pot 1	Pot 2	Pot 3	Pot 4
1. United Arab Emirates (98); 2. Jordan (106)	3. Saudi Arabia (107); 4. Iraq (116)	5. Bahrain (117); 6. Oman (120)	7. Mongolia (121); 8. Myanmar (124); 9. Tajikistan (–)

Group A

	United Arab Emirates	Oman	Saudi Arabia	Myanmar	RR W–L	Matches W–L	Sets W–L	Games W–L	Standings
United Arab Emirates		3–0	3–0	3–0	3–0	9–0	18–2	117–72	1
Oman	3–0		1–2	2–1	1–2	3–6	9–13	82–109	2
Saudi Arabia	0–3	2–1		1–2	1–2	3–6	8–14	99–105	3
Myanmar	0–3	1–2	2–1		1–2	3–6	8–14	97–109	4

Group B

	Jordan	Bahrain	Iraq	Tajikistan	Mongolia	RR W–L	Matches W–L	Sets W–L	Games W–L	Standings
Jordan		3–0	3–0	3–0	3–0	4–0	12–0	24–1	149–54	1
Bahrain	0–3		3–0	2–1	2–1	3–1	7–5	15–12	132–111	2
Iraq	0–3	0–3		2–1	2–1	2–2	4–8	8–16	88–114	3
Tajikistan	0–3	1–2	1–2		3–0	1–3	5–7	11–15	100–127	4
Mongolia	0–3	1–2	1–2	0–3		0–4	2–10	6–20	74–137	5

Play-offs

Placing	A Team	Score	B Team
Promotional	United Arab Emirates	3–0	Bahrain
Promotional	Oman	1–2	Jordan
5th–6th	Saudi Arabia	0–3	Iraq
7th–8th	Myanmar	2–1	Tajikistan
9th	N/A	—	Mongolia

United Arab Emirates and Jordan promoted to Group III in 2017.

== Europe/Africa Zone ==
=== Group I ===
Seeds:

1. Spain
2. Slovakia
3. Netherlands
4. Ukraine

Remaining nations:

- Austria
- Hungary
- Israel
- Portugal
- Romania
- Russia
- Slovenia
- Sweden

==== Draw ====
Second Round Play-offs
Viana do Castelo, Portugal (clay)
Slovenia	0
Portugal	5
Ramat HaSharon, Israel (hard)
Sweden	1
Israel	3

First Round Play-offs
bye
Slovenia
bye
Portugal
Båstad, Sweden (clay)
Sweden	0
3	Netherlands	5
Israel
bye

First Round
1	Spain
bye
Arad, Romania (indoor hard)
Romania	4
Slovenia	1
4	Ukraine
bye
Guimarães, Portugal (indoor hard)
Portugal	1
Austria	4
Kazan, Russia (indoor hard)
Russia	5
Sweden	0
bye
3	Netherlands
Budapest, Hungary (indoor clay)
Hungary	3
Israel	2
bye
2	Slovakia

Second Round
Cluj-Napoca, Romania (indoor hard)
1	Spain	4
Romania	1
Kyiv, Ukraine (hard)
4	Ukraine	3
Austria	2
Moscow, Russia (hard)
Russia	4
3	Netherlands	1
Budapest, Hungary (clay)
Hungary	0
2	Slovakia	3

- Slovenia and Sweden relegated to Group II in 20.
- Spain, Ukraine, Russia, and Slovakia advance to World Group Play-off.

=== Group II ===
Seeds:

1. Lithuania
2. Denmark
3. Belarus
4. Bulgaria
5. Bosnia and Herzegovina
6. Latvia
7. Finland
8. South Africa

Remaining nations:

- Egypt
- Georgia
- Luxembourg
- Monaco
- Norway
- Tunisia
- Turkey
- Zimbabwe

==== Draw ====
Play-offs
Capellen, Luxembourg (hard)
Norway	3
Luxembourg	2
Tunis, Tunisia (hard)
4	Bulgaria	2
Tunisia	3
Roquebrune-Cap-Martin, Monaco (clay)
Monaco	3
Egypt	1
Tbilisi, Georgia (hard)
Zimbabwe	2
Georgia	3

First Round
Šiauliai, Lithuania (indoor hard)
1	Lithuania	3
Norway	2
Centurion, South Africa (hard)
8	South Africa	5
Luxembourg	0
Ankara, Turkey (indoor hard)
4	Bulgaria	2
Turkey	3
Zenica, Bosnia and Herz. (indoor carpet)
5	Bosnia and Herzegovina	3
Tunisia	1
Daugavpils, Latvia (indoor hard)
Monaco	2
6	Latvia	3
Cairo, Egypt (clay)
Egypt	1
3	Belarus	3
Kittilä, Finland (indoor hard)
Zimbabwe	1
7	Finland	4
Tbilisi, Georgia (indoor carpet)
Georgia	0
2	Denmark	5

Second Round
Kaunas, Lithuania (clay)
1	Lithuania	3
8	South Africa	2
Bihać, Bosnia and Herzegovina (clay)
Turkey	1
5	Bosnia and Herzegovina	3
Minsk, Belarus (hard)
6	Latvia	1
3	Belarus	4
Kongens Lyngby, Den. (indoor carpet)
7	Finland	2
2	Denmark	3

Third Round
Vilnius, Lithuania (indoor hard)
1	Lithuania	0
5	Bosnia and Herzegovina	5
Minsk, Belarus (hard)
3	Belarus	4
2	Denmark	1

- Luxembourg, Bulgaria, Egypt, and Zimbabwe relegated to Group III in 2017.
- Bosnia and Herzegovina and Belarus promoted to Group I in 2017.

=== Group III Europe ===
Date: 2–5 March

Location: Tallinn, Estonia (indoor hard)

Format: Round-robin basis. Four pools of four teams (Pools A, B, C and D). The winners of each pool play-off against each other to determine which two nations are promoted to Europe/Africa Zone Group II in 2017.

Seeding: The seeding was based on the Davis Cup Rankings of 30 November 2015 (shown in parentheses below).

Pot 1	Pot 2	Pot 3	Pot 4
1. Moldova (52); 2. Ireland (64); 3. Cyprus (69); 4. Estonia (72)	5. Macedonia (84); 6. Montenegro (91); 7. Malta (95); 8. Greece (100)	9. Liechtenstein (107); 10. San Marino (109); 11. Armenia (117); 12. Iceland (118)	13. Albania (124); 14. Andorra (126); 15. Kosovo (–)

Groups:

Group A

	Moldova	Malta	San Marino	RR W–L	Matches W–L	Sets W–L	Games W–L	Standings
Moldova		3–0	3–0	2–0	6–0	12–0	72–18	1
Malta	0–3		2–1	1–1	2–4	4–8	47–55	2
San Marino	0–3	1–2		0–2	1–5	2–10	26–72	3

Group B

	Ireland	Macedonia	Armenia	Albania	RR W–L	Matches W–L	Sets W–L	Games W–L	Standings
Ireland		2–1	3–0	3–0	3–0	8–1	17–2	108–39	1
Macedonia	1–2		3–0	3–0	2–1	7–2	14–5	100–61	2
Armenia	0–3	0–3		2–1	1–2	2–7	5–14	58–94	3
Albania	0–3	0–3	1–2		0–3	1–8	2–17	36–108	4

Group C

	Cyprus	Montenegro	Andorra	Iceland	RR W–L	Matches W–L	Sets W–L	Games W–L	Standings
Cyprus		3–0	3–0	2–1	3–0	8–1	17–3	115–52	1
Montenegro	0–3		2–1	2–1	2–1	4–5	8–12	89–100	2
Andorra	0–3	1–2		2–1	1–2	3–6	9–12	86–106	3
Iceland	1–2	1–2	1–2		0–3	3–6	6–13	67–99	4

Group D

	Estonia	Greece	Liechtenstein	Kosovo	RR W–L	Matches W–L	Sets W–L	Games W–L	Standings
Estonia		3–0	3–0	3–0	3–0	9–0	18–0	109–18	1
Greece	0–3		3–0	3–0	2–1	6–3	12–6	75–63	2
Liechtenstein	0–3	0–3		3–0	1–2	3–6	6–12	62–85	3
Kosovo	0–3	0–3	0–3		0–3	0–9	0–18	28–108	4

Play-offs

Placing	A Team	Score	D Team
Promotional	Moldova	0–2	Estonia
5th–8th	Malta	1–2	Greece
9th–12th	San Marino	1–2	Liechtenstein
13th–15th	N/A	—	Kosovo

Placing	B Team	Score	C Team
Promotional	Ireland	0–2	Cyprus
5th–8th	Macedonia	2–0	Montenegro
9th–12th	Armenia	1–2	Andorra
13th–15th	Albania	0–3	Iceland

Cyprus and Estonia promoted to Group II in 2017.

=== Group III Africa ===
Date: 11–16 July

Location: Antananarivo, Madagascar (clay)

Confirmed teams:

- Algeria
- Benin
- Botswana
- Cameroon
- Kenya
- Madagascar
- Morocco
- Mozambique
- Namibia
- Nigeria

Inactive teams:

- Angola
- Burkina Faso
- Congo
- Djibouti
- Ethiopia
- Gabon
- Ghana
- Ivory Coast
- Lesotho
- Libya
- Mali
- Mauritius
- Rwanda
- Senegal
- Sudan
- Togo
- Uganda
- Zambia

Format: Round-robin basis. Two pools of five teams (Pools A and B). The winner of each pool plays off against the runner-up of the other pool to determine which two nations are promoted to Europe/Africa Zone Group II in 2017.

Seeding: The seeding was based on the Davis Cup Rankings of 7 March 2016 (shown in parentheses below).

Pot 1	Pot 2	Pot 3	Pot 4	Pot 5
1. Morocco (68); 2. Algeria (80)	3. Benin (83); 4. Namibia (84)	5. Madagascar (101); 6. Mozambique (105)	7. Nigeria (113); 8. Botswana (119)	9. Cameroon (122); 10. Kenya (127)

Group A

	Morocco	Namibia	Nigeria	Cameroon	Mozambique	RR W–L	Matches W–L	Sets W–L	Games W–L	Standings
Morocco		3–0	2–1	3–0	3–0	4–0	11–1	22–4	148–66	1
Namibia	0–3		2–1	3–0	3–0	3–1	8–4	16–10	127–105	2
Nigeria	1–2	1–2		3–0	3–0	2–2	8–4	17–8	125–105	3
Cameroon	0–3	0–3	0–3		3–0	1–3	3–9	9–18	118–134	4
Mozambique	0–3	0–3	0–3	0–3		0–4	0–12	0–24	36–144	5

Group B

	Madagascar	Benin	Kenya	Algeria	Botswana	RR W–L	Matches W–L	Sets W–L	Games W–L	Standings
Madagascar		2–1	3–0	3–0	3–0	4–0	11–1	22–6	151–86	1
Benin	1–2		2–1	3–0	3–0	3–1	9–3	21–6	150–93	2
Kenya	0–3	1–2		3–0	2–1	2–2	6–6	14–14	127–129	3
Algeria	0–3	0–3	0–3		2–1	1–3	2–10	5–22	90–149	4
Botswana	0–3	0–3	1–2	1–2		0–4	2–10	6–20	82–143	5

Play-offs

Placing	A Team	Score	B Team
Promotional	Morocco	2–0	Benin
Promotional	Namibia	0–2	Madagascar
5th–6th	Nigeria	2–1	Kenya
7th–8th	Cameroon	0–2	Algeria
9th–10th	Mozambique	0–2	Botswana

Morocco and Madagascar promoted to Group II in 2017.
