= Bun Kenny =

Cambodian–French tennis player

- Country (sports): Cambodia
- Residence: Phnom Penh, Cambodia
- Born: 1 June 1990 (age 35) Metz, France
- Height: 180 cm (5 ft 11 in)
- Retired: 2015
- Plays: Right-handed (two handed-backhand)
- Prize money: $9,883

Singles
- Career record: 16–6 (at ATP Tour level, Grand Slam level, and in Davis Cup)
- Career titles: 0
- Highest ranking: No. 995 (17 October 2022)

Doubles
- Career record: 7–3 (at ATP Tour level, Grand Slam level, and in Davis Cup)
- Career titles: 0
- Highest ranking: No. 953 (29 April 2013)

Team competitions
- Davis Cup: 23–9
Medal record
Men's Tennis
Representing Cambodia
Southeast Asian Games
Bronze medal – third place	2011 Jakarta-Palembang	Team
Bronze medal – third place	2015 Singapore	Singles
Bronze medal – third place	2023 Cambodia	Singles

Bun Kenny (born 1 June 1990 in Metz) is a Cambodian–French retired tennis player.

Bun has a career high ATP singles ranking of 1080 achieved on 16 July 2012, and a career high ATP doubles ranking of 953 achieved on 29 April 2013.

Playing for Cambodia in Davis Cup, Bun has a W/L record of 23–9.

== ATP Challenger and ITF Futures finals ==
=== Doubles: 2 (0–2) ===
ITF Futures (0–2)

Result	W–L	Date	Tournament	Tier	Surface	Partner	Opponents	Score
Loss	0–1	Apr 2013	Ho Chi Minh City, Vietnam	Futures	Hard	(South Korea) Kim Jae-hwan	(United Kingdom) Andrew Fitzpatrick (United Kingdom) Joshua Ward-Hibbert	4–6, 2–6
Loss	0–2	Nov 2014	Phnom Penh, Cambodia	Futures	Hard	(Canada) Kelsey Stevenson	(Philippines) Jeson Patrombon (Indonesia) David Agung Susanto	7–5, 3–6, [7–10]
