= Cambodia Davis Cup team =

National tennis team

Cambodia
- Captain: Rithivit Tep
- Coach: Braen Aneiros-Romero
- Nations Ranking: 102 (18 Mar 2024)
- Colors: Red & White
- First year: 2012
- Years played: 12
- Ties played (W–L): 52 (28-24)
- Best finish: Asia/Oceania Group III (2013, 2014, 2015, 2016, 2018, 2023)
- Most singles wins: Kenny Bun (28-9)
- Most doubles wins: Kenny Bun (11-5)
- Best doubles team: Kenny Bun & Phalkun Mam (4-4)
- Most ties played: Kenny Bun (42)
- Most years played: Kenny Bun (11)

The Cambodia Davis Cup team represents Cambodia in Davis Cup tennis competition and are governed by the Tennis Federation of Cambodia. The President of the Tennis Federation of Cambpdoa is Mr. Rithy Sear while the General Secretary is Mr. Tep Rithivit.

Cambodia currently compete in the Asia/Oceania Zone of Group III.

== History ==
Cambodia competed in its first Davis Cup in 2012.

== Current team (2024) ==
- Kenny Bun
- Timothy Tep
- Sarinreach Leng
- Mathew Krusling
- Ponlok Khleang

== Results ==
Year	Zone	Final Round	Final opponent	Score	Result
2024	Asia/Oceania Group IV	Promotional Play-off	Qatar	0-2	Promoted to Asia/Oceania Zone Group III
2023	Asia/Oceania Group III	Relegation Play-off	Saudi Arabia	3-0	Relegated to Asia/Oceania Zone Group IV
2022	Asia/Oceania Group IV	Promotional Play-off	Singapore	1-2	Promoted to Asia/Oceania Zone Group III
2021	Asia/Oceania Group IV	Promotional Play-off	Saudi Arabia	2-1	Stayed at Asia/Oceania Zone Group IV
2019	Asia/Oceania Group IV	5th to 8th Play-off	Saudi Arabia	2-1	Stayed at Asia/Oceania Zone Group IV
2018	Asia/Oceania Group III	Relegation Play-off	Saudi Arabia	3-0	Relegated to Asia/Oceania Zone Group IV
2017	Asia/Oceania Group IV	Promotional Play-off	Oman	0-2	Promoted to Asia/Oceania Zone Group III
2016	Asia/Oceania Group III	Promotional Play-off	Turkmenistan	2-1	Relegated to Asia/Oceania Zone Group IV
2015	Asia/Oceania Group III	Relegation Play-off	Qatar	1-2	Stayed at Asia/Oceania Zone Group III
2014	Asia/Oceania Group III	Relegation Play-off	Singapore	1-2	Stayed at Asia/Oceania Zone Group III
2013	Asia/Oceania Group III	Second Round	Malaysia	3-0	Stayed at Asia/Oceania Zone Group III
2012	Asia/Oceania Group IV	1st to 4th Play-off	Turkmenistan	0-3	Promoted to Asia/Oceania Zone Group III

== See also ==
- Davis Cup
