= 2022 Davis Cup Asia/Oceania Zone Group III =

Davis Cup competition in 2022

The Asia/Oceania Zone was the unique zone within Group 3 of the regional Davis Cup competition in 2022. The zone's competition was held in round robin format in Tây Ninh, Vietnam, from 10 to 13 August 2022.

== Participating nations ==
- Iran
- Jordan
- Malaysia
- Pacific Oceania
- Saudi Arabia
- Syria
- United Arab Emirates
- Vietnam

== Draw ==
Date: 10–13 August 2022

Location: Hai Dang Tennis Club, Tây Ninh, Vietnam (hard)

Format: Round-robin basis. Two pools of two teams. Two pools of four teams and nations will play each team once in their group. The two group winners will automatically earn promotion to the World Group II play-offs in 2022. The two second-placed teams will fight for the third remaining promotion spot. The four teams finishing in third and last place will fight to avoid relegation to Asia/Oceania Group IV.

=== Seeding ===
Pot	Nation	Rank^{1}	Seed
1	Vietnam	69	1
1	Pacific Oceania	74	2
2	Syria	80	3
2	Saudi Arabia	86	4
3	Iran	87	5
3	Jordan	93	6
4	Malaysia	95	7
4	United Arab Emirates	96	8

- ^{1}Davis Cup Rankings as of 7 March 2022

=== Round Robin ===
==== Pool A ====
		VIE	JOR	MAS	SYR	RR; W–L	Set; W–L	Game; W–L	Standings
1	Vietnam		3–0	3–0	3–0	3–0	18–3 (86%)	120–65 (65%)	1
6	Jordan	0–3		2–1	2–1	2–1	9–11 (45%)	90–83 (52%)	2
7	Malaysia	0–3	1–2		3–0	1–2	10–11 (48%)	79–84 (48%)	3
3	Syria	0–3	1–2	0–3		0–3	4–16 (20%)	55–112 (33%)	4

==== Pool B ====
		POC	KSA	IRI	UAE	RR; W–L	Set; W–L	Game; W–L	Standings
2	Pacific Oceania		3–0	3–0	3–0	3–0	18–0 (100%)	111–49 (69%)	1
4	Saudi Arabia	0–3		2–1	3–0	2–1	10–8 (56%)	85–64 (57%)	2
5	Iran	0–3	1–2		3–0	1–2	8–11 (42%)	81–87 (48%)	3
8	United Arab Emirates	0–3	0–3	0–3		0–3	1–18 (5%)	36–113 (24%)	4

Standings are determined by: 1. number of wins; 2. number of matches; 3. in two-team ties, head-to-head records; 4. in three-team ties, (a) percentage of sets won (head-to-head records if two teams remain tied), then (b) percentage of games won (head-to-head records if two teams remain tied), then (c) Davis Cup rankings.

=== Playoffs ===
Placing	A Team	Score	B Team
1st–2nd	Vietnam	1–2	Pacific Oceania
Promotion	Jordan	2–0	Saudi Arabia
Relegation	Malaysia	3–0	United Arab Emirates
Relegation	Syria	1–2	Iran

- Jordan, Pacific Oceania and Vietnam qualify for the 2023 Davis Cup World Group II Play-offs
- Syria and United Arab Emirates are relegated to 2023 Davis Cup Asia/Oceania Zone Group IV

== Round Robin ==
=== Pool A ===
==== Vietnam vs. Jordan ====
Vietnam
3
Hai Dang Tennis Club, Tây Ninh, Vietnam
10 August 2022
Hard

Jordan
0

			1	2	3
1	(Vietnam) (Jordan)	Trịnh Linh Giang; Mousa Alkotop	7; 5	6; 3
2	(Vietnam) (Jordan)	Lý Hoàng Nam; Abedallah Shelbayh	6; 2	4; 6	7^{8} 6^{6}
3	(Vietnam) (Jordan)	Lê Quốc Khánh / Nguyễn Văn Phương; Hamzeh Al-Aswad / Mohammad Alkotop	6; 3	6; 4

==== Syria vs. Malaysia ====
Syria
0
Hai Dang Tennis Club, Tây Ninh, Vietnam
10 August 2022
Hard

Malaysia
3

			1	2	3
1	(Syria) (Malaysia)	Majdi Salim; Koay Hao-sheng	1; 6	3; 6
2	(Syria) (Malaysia)	Yacoub Makzoume; Naufal Siddiq Kamaruzzaman	2; 6	3; 6
3	(Syria) (Malaysia)	Yacoub Makzoume / Rabee Sleem; Koay Hao-sheng / Syed Mohd Agil Syed Naguib	6; 3	2; 6	1; 6

==== Vietnam vs. Malaysia ====
Vietnam
3
Hai Dang Tennis Club, Tây Ninh, Vietnam
11 August 2022
Hard

Malaysia
0

			1	2	3
1	(Vietnam) (Malaysia)	Nguyễn Văn Phương; Koay Hao-sheng	6; 1	1; 6	6; 3
2	(Vietnam) (Malaysia)	Lý Hoàng Nam; Naufal Siddiq Kamaruzzaman	6; 3	6; 1
3	(Vietnam) (Malaysia)	Phạm Minh Tuấn / Trịnh Linh Giang; Koay Hao-sheng / Syed Mohd Agil Syed Naguib	6; 2	6; 1

==== Syria vs. Jordan ====
Syria
1
Hai Dang Tennis Club, Tây Ninh, Vietnam
11 August 2022
Hard

Jordan
2

			1	2	3
1	(Syria) (Jordan)	Yacoub Makzoume; Mousa Alkotop	6; 4	6; 4
2	(Syria) (Jordan)	Rabee Sleem; Abedallah Shelbayh	1; 6	1; 6
3	(Syria) (Jordan)	Yacoub Makzoume / Majdi Salim; Hamzeh Al-Aswad / Abedallah Shelbayh	1; 6	3; 6

==== Vietnam vs. Syria ====
Vietnam
3
Hai Dang Tennis Club, Tây Ninh, Vietnam
12 August 2022
Hard

Syria
0

			1	2	3
1	(Vietnam) (Syria)	Phạm Minh Tuấn; Yacoub Makzoume	6; 2	4; 6	6; 1
2	(Vietnam) (Syria)	Nguyễn Văn Phương; Rabee Sleem	7^{7} 6^{2}	6; 3
3	(Vietnam) (Syria)	Lê Quốc Khánh / Trịnh Linh Giang; Majdi Salim / Rabee Sleem	6; 1	6; 0

==== Jordan vs. Malaysia ====
Jordan
2
Hai Dang Tennis Club, Tây Ninh, Vietnam
12 August 2022
Hard

Malaysia
1

			1	2	3
1	(Jordan) (Malaysia)	Mohammad Alkotop; Koay Hao-sheng	3; 6	1; 6
2	(Jordan) (Malaysia)	Abedallah Shelbayh; Christian Andre Sheng Liew	6; 0	6; 1
3	(Jordan) (Malaysia)	Hamzeh Al-Aswad / Abedallah Shelbayh; Koay Hao-sheng / Syed Mohd Agil Syed Naguib	1; 6	6; 1	6; 3

=== Pool B ===
==== Pacific Oceania vs. Iran ====
Pacific Oceania
3
Hai Dang Tennis Club, Tây Ninh, Vietnam
10 August 2022
Hard

Iran
0

			1	2	3
1	(Pacific Oceania) (Iran)	Clément Mainguy; Samyar Elyasi	6; 4	6; 4
2	(Pacific Oceania) (Iran)	Colin Sinclair; Ali Yazdani	6; 2	6; 3
3	(Pacific Oceania) (Iran)	Brett Baudinet / Gillian Osmont; Amir Hossein Badi / Kasra Rahmani	6; 3	6; 3

==== Saudi Arabia vs. United Arab Emirates ====
Saudi Arabia
3
Hai Dang Tennis Club, Tây Ninh, Vietnam
10 August 2022
Hard

United Arab Emirates
0

			1	2	3
1	(Saudi Arabia) (United Arab Emirates)	Saud Alhogbani; Abdulrahman Al Janahi	6; 1	6; 2
2	(Saudi Arabia) (United Arab Emirates)	Anmar Faleh Alhogbani; Abdulla Al Marzouqi	6; 0	6; 0
3	(Saudi Arabia) (United Arab Emirates)	Zaid Ahmed / Anmar Faleh Alhogbani; Abdulrahman Al Janahi / Abdulla Al Marzouqi	6; 1	6; 0

==== Pacific Oceania vs. United Arab Emirates ====
Pacific Oceania
3
Hai Dang Tennis Club, Tây Ninh, Vietnam
11 August 2022
Hard

United Arab Emirates
0

			1	2	3
1	(Pacific Oceania) (United Arab Emirates)	Clément Mainguy; Abdulrahman Al-Janahi	7; 5	6; 2
2	(Pacific Oceania) (United Arab Emirates)	Colin Sinclair; Abdulla Al Marzouqi	6; 2	6; 0
3	(Pacific Oceania) (United Arab Emirates)	Brett Baudinet / Gillian Osmont; Abdulrahman Al-Janahi / Abdulla Al Marzouqi	6; 4	6; 0

==== Saudi Arabia vs. Iran ====
Saudi Arabia
2
Hai Dang Tennis Club, Tây Ninh, Vietnam
11 August 2022
Hard

Iran
1

			1	2	3
1	(Saudi Arabia) (Iran)	Saud Alhogbani; Ali Yazdani	6; 2	7; 5
2	(Saudi Arabia) (Iran)	Anmar Faleh Alhogbani; Amir Hossein Badi	6; 2	6; 1
3	(Saudi Arabia) (Iran)	Zaid Ahmed / Abdullah Alfaraj; Samyar Elyasi / Ali Yazdani	3; 6	4; 6

==== Pacific Oceania vs. Saudi Arabia ====
Pacific Oceania
3
Hai Dang Tennis Club, Tây Ninh, Vietnam
12 August 2022
Hard

Saudi Arabia
0

			1	2	3
1	(Pacific Oceania) (Saudi Arabia)	Clément Mainguy; Saud Alhogbani	7; 5	0; 0		retired
2	(Pacific Oceania) (Saudi Arabia)	Colin Sinclair; Anmar Faleh Alhogbani	6; 4	6; 0
3	(Pacific Oceania) (Saudi Arabia)	Brett Baudinet / Gillian Osmont; Zaid Ahmed / Abdullah Alfaraj	7^{9} 6^{7}	6; 2

==== Iran vs. United Arab Emirates ====
Iran
3
Hai Dang Tennis Club, Tây Ninh, Vietnam
12 August 2022
Hard

United Arab Emirates
0

			1	2	3
1	(Iran) (United Arab Emirates)	Samyar Elyasi; Abdulrahman Al Janahi	3; 6	6; 2	7; 5
2	(Iran) (United Arab Emirates)	Ali Yazdani; Abdulla Al Marzouqi	6; 0	6; 1
3	(Iran) (United Arab Emirates)	Amir Hossein Badi / Hesam Esmail Yazdi; Abdulrahman Al Janahi / Abdulla Almarzooqi	6; 2	6; 3

== Play-offs ==
=== 1st place play-off ===
==== Vietnam vs. Pacific Oceania ====
Vietnam
1
Hai Dang Tennis Club, Tây Ninh, Vietnam
13 August 2022
Hard

Pacific Oceania
2

			1	2	3
1	(Vietnam) (Pacific Oceania)	Trịnh Linh Giang; Clément Mainguy	6^{4} 7^{7}	3; 6
2	(Vietnam) (Pacific Oceania)	Lý Hoàng Nam; Colin Sinclair	6; 2	3; 6	6; 3
3	(Vietnam) (Pacific Oceania)	Lê Quốc Khánh / Lý Hoàng Nam; Brett Baudinet / Colin Sinclair	7^{10} 6^{8}	3; 6	3; 6

=== Promotion play-off ===
==== Jordan vs. Saudi Arabia ====
Jordan
2
Hai Dang Tennis Club, Tây Ninh, Vietnam
13 August 2022
Hard

Saudi Arabia
0

			1	2	3
1	(Jordan) (Saudi Arabia)	Mousa Alkotop; Abdullah Alfaraj	6; 3	6; 4
2	(Jordan) (Saudi Arabia)	Abedallah Shelbayh; Anmar Faleh Alhogbani	6; 2	7; 5
3	(Jordan) (Saudi Arabia)	Hamzeh Al-Aswad / Abedallah Shelbayh; Anmar Faleh Alhogbani / Saud Alhogbani				not played

=== Relegation play-offs ===
==== Malaysia vs. United Arab Emirates ====
Malaysia
3
Hai Dang Tennis Club, Tây Ninh, Vietnam
13 August 2022
Hard

United Arab Emirates
0

			1	2	3
1	(Malaysia) (United Arab Emirates)	Koay Hao-sheng; Abdulrahman Al Janahi	6; 2	6; 2
2	(Malaysia) (United Arab Emirates)	Naufal Siddiq Kamaruzzaman; Abdulla Al Marzouqi	6; 0	6; 0
3	(Malaysia) (United Arab Emirates)	Naufal Siddiq Kamaruzzaman / Christian Andre Sheng Liew; Abdulla Al Marzouqi / Abdulla Almarzooqi	6; 0	6; 1

==== Syria vs. Iran ====
Syria
1
Hai Dang Tennis Club, Tây Ninh, Vietnam
13 August 2022
Hard

Iran
2

			1	2	3
1	(Syria) (Iran)	Majdi Salim; Ali Yazdani	6^{3} 7^{7}	1; 6
2	(Syria) (Iran)	Yacoub Makzoume; Amir Hossein Badi	2; 6	6; 4	6; 0
3	(Syria) (Iran)	Yacoub Makzoume / Rabee Sleem; Samyar Elyasi / Ali Yazdani	4; 6	4; 6
