= 2024 Davis Cup Asia/Oceania Zone Group III =

Davis Cup competition in 2024

The Asia/Oceania Zone was the unique zone within Group 3 of the regional Davis Cup competition in 2024. The zone's competition was held in round robin format in Amman, Jordan, from 10 to 15 June 2024.

== Participating nations ==
- Indonesia
- Iran
- Jordan
- Malaysia
- Pacific Oceania
- Saudi Arabia
- Singapore
- Syria
- Thailand
- Vietnam

== Draw ==
Date: 10–15 June 2024

Location: Jordan Tennis Federation, Amman, Jordan (Hard)

Format: Round-robin basis. Two pools of five teams and nations will play each team once in their group. The two pool winners will automatically be promoted to the World Group II Play-offs in 2025. They will be joined by the winner of a promotion play-off between the two teams finishing in second place in each pool.

The two teams finishing in fifth place in each pool will be relegated to Asia/Oceania Group IV in 2025.

=== Seeding ===
Pot	Nation	Rank^{1}	Seed
1	Indonesia	65	1
1	Thailand	69	2
2	Vietnam	70	3
2	Iran	71	4
3	Pacific Oceania	75	5
3	Malaysia	80	6
4	Jordan	82	7
4	Saudi Arabia	85	8
5	Syria	90=	9
5	Singapore	95	10

- ^{1}Davis Cup Rankings as of 18 March 2024

=== Round Robin ===
==== Pool A ====
		KSA	VIE	SGP	INA	MAS	RR; W–L	Set; W–L	Game; W–L	Standings
8	Saudi Arabia		2–1	2–1	2–1	2–1	4–0	8–4 (%)	– (%)	1
3	Vietnam	1–2		2–1	2–1	1–2	2–2	6–6 (%)	– (%)	2
10	Singapore	1–2	1–2		2–1	3–0	2–2	7–5 (%)	– (%)	3
1	Indonesia	1–2	1–2	1–2		3–0	1–3	6–6 (%)	– (%)	4
6	Malaysia	1–2	2–1	0–3	0–3		1–3	3–9 (%)	– (%)	5

==== Pool B ====
		THA	SYR	JOR	IRN	POC	RR; W–L	Set; W–L	Game; W–L	Standings
2	Thailand		2–1	3–0	3–0	3–0	4–0	11–1 (%)	– (%)	1
9	Syria	1–2		2–1	3–0	3–0	3–1	9–3 (%)	– (%)	2
7	Jordan	0–3	1–2		3–0	3–0	2–2	7–5 (%)	– (%)	3
4	Iran	0–3	0–3	0–3		2–1	1–3	2–10 (%)	– (%)	4
5	Pacific Oceania	0–3	0–3	0–3	1–2		0–4	1–11 (%)	– (%)	5

Standings are determined by: 1. number of wins; 2. number of matches; 3. in two-team ties, head-to-head records; 4. in three-team ties, (a) percentage of sets won (head-to-head records if two teams remain tied), then (b) percentage of games won (head-to-head records if two teams remain tied), then (c) Davis Cup rankings.

=== Playoffs ===
Placing	A Team	Score	B Team
First	Saudi Arabia	1–2	Thailand
Promotional	Vietnam	1–2	Syria
Fifth	Singapore	1–2	Jordan
Seventh	Indonesia	2–1	Iran
Relegation	Malaysia	2–0	Pacific Oceania

- Thailand, Saudi Arabia and Syria were promoted to 2025 Davis Cup World Group II play-offs and Indonesia were also promoted as one of the four highest-ranked non-promoted teams in each 2024 Regional Group III event.
- Malaysia and Pacific Oceania were relegated to 2025 Davis Cup Asia/Oceania Zone Group IV.

== Round Robin ==
=== Pool A ===
==== Indonesia vs. Malaysia ====
Indonesia
3
Jordan Tennis Federation, Amman, Jordan
10 June 2024
Hard

Malaysia
0

			1	2	3
1	(Indonesia) (Malaysia)	Nathan Anthony Barki; Darrshan Suresh Kumar	6; 2	6; 4
2	(Indonesia) (Malaysia)	Gunawan Trismuwantara; Leroy Yong	3; 6	6; 4	6; 2
3	(Indonesia) (Malaysia)	Anthony Susanto / Tegar Abdi Satrio Wibowo; Muhammad Aiman Hamdan / Naufal Siddiq Kamaruzzaman	6; 4	6; 3

==== Vietnam vs. Saudi Arabia ====
Vietnam
1
Jordan Tennis Federation, Amman, Jordan
10 June 2024
Hard

Saudi Arabia
2

			1	2	3
1	(Vietnam) (Saudi Arabia)	Nguyễn Văn Phương; Saud Alhogbani	3; 6	4; 6
2	(Vietnam) (Saudi Arabia)	Vũ Hà Minh Đức; Ammar Alhaqbani	1; 6	2; 6
3	(Vietnam) (Saudi Arabia)	Minh Dinh Viet Tuan / Truong Vinhhien; Omar Ahmed / Bader Idrees	6^{5} 7^{7}	7^{7} 6^{4}	6; 3

==== Indonesia vs. Singapore ====
Indonesia
1
Jordan Tennis Federation, Amman, Jordan
11 June 2024
Hard

Singapore
2

			1	2	3
1	(Indonesia) (Singapore)	Anthony Susanto; Shaheed Alam	1; 6	4; 6
2	(Indonesia) (Singapore)	Gunawan Trismuwantara; Bill Chan	3; 6	6; 1	5; 7
3	(Indonesia) (Singapore)	Nathan Anthony Barki / Christopher Rungkat; Shaheed Alam / Roy Hobbs	6; 4	6; 2

==== Malaysia vs. Saudi Arabia ====
Malaysia
1
Jordan Tennis Federation, Amman, Jordan
11 June 2024
Hard

Saudi Arabia
2

			1	2	3
1	(Malaysia) (Saudi Arabia)	Darrshan Suresh Kumar; Saud Alhogbani	1; 6	2; 6
2	(Malaysia) (Saudi Arabia)	Leroy Yong; Ammar Alhaqbani	3; 6	2; 6
3	(Malaysia) (Saudi Arabia)	Naufal Siddiq Kamaruzzaman / Leroy Yong; Omar Ahmed / Bader Idrees	3; 6	6; 3	7^{7} 6^{5}

==== Indonesia vs. Vietnam ====
Indonesia
1
Jordan Tennis Federation, Amman, Jordan
12 June 2024
Hard

Vietnam
2

			1	2	3
1	(Indonesia) (Vietnam)	Nathan Anthony Barki; Nguyễn Văn Phương	6; 4	5; 7	4; 6
2	(Indonesia) (Vietnam)	Tegar Abdi Satrio Wibowo; Vũ Hà Minh Đức	3; 6	1; 6
3	(Indonesia) (Vietnam)	Christopher Rungkat / Gunawan Trismuwantara; Minh Dinh Viet Tuan / Truong Vinhhien	6; 2	6; 4

==== Malaysia vs. Singapore ====
Malaysia
0
Jordan Tennis Federation, Amman, Jordan
12 June 2024
Hard

Singapore
3

			1	2	3
1	(Malaysia) (Singapore)	Naufal Siddiq Kamaruzzaman; Shaheed Alam	4; 6	0; 6
2	(Malaysia) (Singapore)	Leroy Yong; Bill Chan	4; 6	2; 6
3	(Malaysia) (Singapore)	Muhammad Aiman Hamdan / Naufal Siddiq Kamaruzzaman; Shaheed Alam / Roy Hobbs	6; 4	3; 6	2; 6

==== Indonesia vs. Saudi Arabia ====
Indonesia
1
Jordan Tennis Federation, Amman, Jordan
13 June 2024
Hard

Saudi Arabia
2

			1	2	3
1	(Indonesia) (Saudi Arabia)	Nathan Anthony Barki; Saud Alhogbani	2; 6	4; 6
2	(Indonesia) (Saudi Arabia)	Gunawan Trismuwantara; Ammar Alhaqbani	2; 6	6^{5} 7^{7}
3	(Indonesia) (Saudi Arabia)	Nathan Anthony Barki / Christopher Rungkat; Omar Ahmed / Bader Idrees	6; 3	6; 3

==== Vietnam vs. Singapore ====
Vietnam
2
Jordan Tennis Federation, Amman, Jordan
13 June 2024
Hard

Singapore
1

			1	2	3
1	(Vietnam) (Singapore)	Nguyễn Văn Phương; Shaheed Alam	6; 4	6; 2
2	(Vietnam) (Singapore)	Vũ Hà Minh Đức; Bill Chan	3; 6	5; 7
3	(Vietnam) (Singapore)	Minh Dinh Viet Tuan / Nguyễn Văn Phương; Shaheed Alam / Roy Hobbs	7^{7} 6^{4}	6^{5} 7^{7}	7; 5

==== Vietnam vs. Malaysia ====
Vietnam
1
Jordan Tennis Federation, Amman, Jordan
14 June 2024
Hard

Malaysia
2

			1	2	3
1	(Vietnam) (Malaysia)	Truong Vinhhien; Darrshan Suresh Kumar	2; 6	3; 6
2	(Vietnam) (Malaysia)	Vũ Hà Minh Đức; Leroy Yong	6^{3} 7^{7}	6; 4	4; 6
3	(Vietnam) (Malaysia)	Anh Pham La Hoang / Minh Dinh Viet Tuan; Muhammad Aiman Hamdan / Naufal Siddiq Kamaruzzaman	7^{10} 6^{8}	7; 5

==== Saudi Arabia vs. Singapore ====
Saudi Arabia
2
Jordan Tennis Federation, Amman, Jordan
14 June 2024
Hard

Singapore
1

			1	2	3
1	(Saudi Arabia) (Singapore)	Saud Alhogbani; Shaheed Alam	4; 6	6; 0	6; 2
2	(Saudi Arabia) (Singapore)	Ammar Alhaqbani; Bill Chan	6; 3	6; 2
3	(Saudi Arabia) (Singapore)	Omar Ahmed / Bader Idrees; Michael Dylan Jimenez / Jerall Yasin	7^{7} 6^{3}	3; 6	3; 6

=== Pool B ===
==== Thailand vs. Pacific Oceania ====
Thailand
3
Jordan Tennis Federation, Amman, Jordan
10 June 2024
Hard

Pacific Oceania
0

			1	2	3
1	(Thailand) (Pacific Oceania)	Kasidit Samrej; Gillian Osmont	6; 1	6; 2
2	(Thailand) (Pacific Oceania)	Maximus Jones; Heve Kelley	6; 3	6; 1
3	(Thailand) (Pacific Oceania)	Pruchya Isaro / Maximus Jones; Brett Baudinet / Gillian Osmont	6; 2	6; 2

==== Iran vs. Jordan ====
Iran
0
Jordan Tennis Federation, Amman, Jordan
10 June 2024
Hard

Jordan
3

			1	2	3
1	(Iran) (Jordan)	Ali Yazdani; Mohammad Alkotop	3; 6	4; 6
2	(Iran) (Jordan)	Sina Moghimi; Mousa Alkotop	4; 6	7^{11} 6^{9}	3; 6
3	(Iran) (Jordan)	Samyar Elyasi / Ali Yazdani; Mohammad Alkotop / Mousa Alkotop	2; 6	3; 6

==== Thailand vs. Syria ====
Thailand
2
Jordan Tennis Federation, Amman, Jordan
11 June 2024
Hard

Syria
1

			1	2	3
1	(Thailand) (Syria)	Kasidit Samrej; Taym Al Azmeh	7^{7} 6^{5}	6; 3
2	(Thailand) (Syria)	Maximus Jones; Hazem Naw	6; 3	6^{5} 7^{7}	1; 6
3	(Thailand) (Syria)	Pruchya Isaro / Kasidit Samrej; Taym Al Azmeh / Hazem Naw	6; 2	3; 6	6; 0

==== Pacific Oceania vs. Jordan ====
Pacific Oceania
0
Jordan Tennis Federation, Amman, Jordan
11 June 2024
Hard

Jordan
3

			1	2	3
1	(Pacific Oceania) (Jordan)	Gillian Osmont; Mohammad Alkotop	2; 6	4; 6
2	(Pacific Oceania) (Jordan)	Heve Kelley; Mousa Alkotop	2; 6	3; 6
3	(Pacific Oceania) (Jordan)	Brett Baudinet / Gillian Osmont; Mohammad Alkotop / Mousa Alkotop	3; 6	2; 6

==== Thailand vs. Iran ====
Thailand
3
Jordan Tennis Federation, Amman, Jordan
12 June 2024
Hard

Iran
0

			1	2	3
1	(Thailand) (Iran)	Kasidit Samrej; Samyar Elyasi	7^{7} 6^{3}	7^{7} 6^{3}
2	(Thailand) (Iran)	Maximus Jones; Ali Yazdani	6; 2	7; 5
3	(Thailand) (Iran)	Thanapet Chanta / Wishaya Trongcharoenchaikul; Samyar Elyasi / Ali Yazdani	6; 3	7^{7} 6^{2}

==== Pacific Oceania vs. Syria ====
Pacific Oceania
0
Jordan Tennis Federation, Amman, Jordan
12 June 2024
Hard

Syria
3

			1	2	3
1	(Pacific Oceania) (Syria)	Gillian Osmont; Taym Al Azmeh	4; 6	4; 6
2	(Pacific Oceania) (Syria)	Heve Kelley; Hazem Naw	1; 6	0; 6
3	(Pacific Oceania) (Syria)	Brett Baudinet / Gillian Osmont; Yacoub Makzoume / Hazem Naw	6^{0} 7^{7}	4; 6

==== Thailand vs. Jordan ====
Thailand
3
Jordan Tennis Federation, Amman, Jordan
13 June 2024
Hard

Jordan
0

			1	2	3
1	(Thailand) (Jordan)	Kasidit Samrej; Mohammad Alkotop	6; 3	6; 4
2	(Thailand) (Jordan)	Maximus Jones; Mousa Alkotop	6; 3	6; 3
3	(Thailand) (Jordan)	Thanapet Chanta / Wishaya Trongcharoenchaikul; Malek El-Qurneh / Zaid Mashni	5; 7	7^{8} 6^{6}	6; 1

==== Iran vs. Syria ====
Iran
0
Jordan Tennis Federation, Amman, Jordan
13 June 2024
Hard

Syria
3

			1	2	3
1	(Iran) (Syria)	Ali Yazdani; Taym Al Azmeh	1; 6	2; 6
2	(Iran) (Syria)	Hamidreza Nadaf; Hazem Naw	4; 6	1; 6
3	(Iran) (Syria)	Samyar Elyasi / Ali Yazdani; Yacoub Makzoume / Rabee Saleem	6^{4} 7^{7}	6; 3	6^{1} 7^{7}

==== Iran vs. Pacific Oceania ====
Iran
2
Jordan Tennis Federation, Amman, Jordan
14 June 2024
Hard

Pacific Oceania
1

			1	2	3
1	(Iran) (Pacific Oceania)	Samyar Elyasi; Charlie Benjamin	6; 3	6; 0
2	(Iran) (Pacific Oceania)	Sina Moghimi; Gillian Osmont	6; 4	6; 4
3	(Iran) (Pacific Oceania)	Samyar Elyasi / Hamidreza Nadaf; Brett Baudinet / Charlie Benjamin

==== Jordan vs. Syria ====
Jordan
1
Jordan Tennis Federation, Amman, Jordan
14 June 2024
Hard

Syria
2

			1	2	3
1	(Jordan) (Syria)	Mohammad Alkotop; Taym Al Azmeh	7^{7} 6^{3}	1; 6	6; 4
2	(Jordan) (Syria)	Mousa Alkotop; Hazem Naw	3; 6	2; 6
3	(Jordan) (Syria)	Mohammad Alkotop / Mousa Alkotop; Taym Al Azmeh / Hazem Naw	4; 6	3; 6

== Play-offs ==
=== First place play-off ===
==== Saudi Arabia vs. Thailand ====
Saudi Arabia
1
Jordan Tennis Federation, Amman, Jordan
15 June 2024
Hard

Thailand
2

			1	2	3
1	(Saudi Arabia) (Thailand)	Omar Ahmed; Kasidit Samrej	0; 6	3; 6
2	(Saudi Arabia) (Thailand)	Ammar Alhaqbani; Maximus Jones	6; 3	1; 0		retired
3	(Saudi Arabia) (Thailand)	Omar Ahmed / Saud Alhogbani; Pruchya Isaro / Kasidit Samrej	6; 4	3; 6	2; 6

=== Promotional play-off ===
==== Vietnam vs. Syria ====
Vietnam
1
Jordan Tennis Federation, Amman, Jordan
15 June 2024
Hard

Syria
2

			1	2	3
1	(Vietnam) (Syria)	Nguyễn Văn Phương; Taym Al Azmeh	7^{7} 6^{2}	6; 2
2	(Vietnam) (Syria)	Vũ Hà Minh Đức; Hazem Naw	3; 6	1; 6
3	(Vietnam) (Syria)	Minh Dinh Viet Tuan / Nguyễn Văn Phương; Taym Al Azmeh / Hazem Naw	1; 6	3; 6

=== Fifth place play-off ===
==== Singapore vs. Jordan ====
Singapore
1
Jordan Tennis Federation, Amman, Jordan
15 June 2024
Hard

Jordan
2

			1	2	3
1	(Singapore) (Jordan)	Jerall Yasin; Mohammad Alkotop	3; 6	7; 5	3; 6
2	(Singapore) (Jordan)	Roy Hobbs; Mousa Alkotop	3; 6	6; 1	6; 4
3	(Singapore) (Jordan)	Shaheed Alam / Roy Hobbs; Mohammad Alkotop / Mousa Alkotop	3; 6	4; 6

=== Seventh place play-off ===
==== Indonesia vs. Iran ====
Indonesia
2
Jordan Tennis Federation, Amman, Jordan
15 June 2024
Hard

Iran
1

			1	2	3
1	(Indonesia) (Iran)	Nathan Anthony Barki; Ali Yazdani	2; 6	3; 6
2	(Indonesia) (Iran)	Gunawan Trismuwantara; Sina Moghimi	2; 6	6; 4	7^{8} 6^{6}
3	(Indonesia) (Iran)	Nathan Anthony Barki / Christopher Rungkat; Samyar Elyasi / Ali Yazdani	1; 6	6; 3	7; 5

=== Relegation play-off ===
==== Malaysia vs. Pacific Oceania ====
Malaysia
2
Jordan Tennis Federation, Amman, Jordan
15 June 2024
Hard

Pacific Oceania
0

			1	2	3
1	(Malaysia) (Pacific Oceania)	Darrshan Suresh Kumar; Charlie Benjamin	6; 0	6; 1
2	(Malaysia) (Pacific Oceania)	Naufal Siddiq Kamaruzzaman; Brett Baudinet	6; 1	6; 3
3	(Malaysia) (Pacific Oceania)	Darrshan Suresh Kumar / Leroy Yong; Brett Baudinet / Charlie Benjamin				not played

== Final placements ==
Placing	Teams
Promoted/First	Thailand
Promoted/Second	Saudi Arabia
Promoted/Third	Syria
Fourth	Vietnam
Fifth	Jordan
Sixth	Singapore
Seventh	Indonesia
Eighth	Iran
Relegated/Ninth	Malaysia
Relegated/Tenth	Pacific Oceania

- Thailand, Saudi Arabia and Syria were promoted to 2025 Davis Cup World Group II play-offs and Indonesia were also promoted as one of the four highest-ranked non-promoted teams in each 2024 Regional Group III event.
- Malaysia and Pacific Oceania were relegated to 2025 Davis Cup Asia/Oceania Zone Group IV.
