= 2021 Davis Cup Asia/Oceania Zone Group III =

Davis Cup competition in 2021

The Asia/Oceania Zone was the unique zone within Group 3 of the regional Davis Cup competition in 2021. The zone's competition was held in round robin format in Amman, Jordan, from 15 to 18 September 2021.

== Participating nations ==
- Hong Kong
- Jordan
- Kuwait
- Malaysia
- Pacific Oceania
- Qatar
- Sri Lanka
- Syria
- Vietnam

=== Withdrawn nations ===
- Philippines

== Draw ==
Date: 15–18 September 2021

Location: Jordan Tennis Federation, Amman, Jordan (hard)

Format: Round-robin basis. Three pools of three teams will contest the round-robin stage of the event. The top two teams in each pool will play-off, with the three winners earning promotion. The bottom team in each pool will be relegated to Asia/Oceania Group IV.

=== Seeding ===
Pot	Nation	Rank^{1}	Seed
1	Hong Kong	68	1
1	Vietnam	71	2
1	Syria	76	3
2	Sri Lanka	78	4
2	Kuwait	80	5
2	Qatar	81	6
3	Jordan	90	7
3	Pacific Oceania	92	8
3	Malaysia	97	9

- ^{1}Davis Cup Rankings as of 8 March 2021

=== Round Robin ===
==== Pool A ====
		HKG	MAS	KUW	RR; W–L	Set; W–L	Game; W–L	Standings
1	Hong Kong		3–0	2–1	5–1	10–3 (77%)	71–46 (61%)	1
9	Malaysia	0–3		3–0	3–3	7–7 (50%)	64–73 (47%)	2
5	Kuwait	1–2	0–3		1–5	3–10 (23%)	60–76 (44%)	3

==== Pool B ====
		VIE	POC	QAT	RR; W–L	Set; W–L	Game; W–L	Standings
2	Vietnam		2–1	2–1	4–2	9–6 (60%)	78–63 (55%)	1
8	Pacific Oceania	1–2		2–1	3–3	8–7 (53%)	70–67 (51%)	2
6	Qatar	1–2	1–2		2–4	4–8 (33%)	41–59 (41%)	3

==== Pool C ====
		SYR	JOR	SRI	RR; W–L	Set; W–L	Game; W–L	Standings
3	Syria		3–0	3–0	6–0	12–1 (92%)	76–43 (64%)	1
7	Jordan	0–3		2–1	2–4	4–9 (31%)	52–72 (42%)	2
4	Sri Lanka	0–3	1–2		1–5	4–10 (29%)	66–79 (46%)	3

Standings are determined by: 1. number of wins; 2. number of matches; 3. in two-team ties, head-to-head records; 4. in three-team ties, (a) percentage of sets won (head-to-head records if two teams remain tied), then (b) percentage of games won (head-to-head records if two teams remain tied), then (c) Davis Cup rankings.

=== Playoffs ===
Placing	Team 1	Score	Team 2
Promotional	Hong Kong	2–0	Jordan
Promotional	Vietnam	2–0	Malaysia
Promotional	Syria	1–2	Pacific Oceania

== Round Robin ==
=== Pool A ===
==== Hong Kong vs. Malaysia ====
Hong Kong
3
Jordan Tennis Federation, Amman, Jordan
15 September 2021
Hard

Malaysia
0

			1	2	3
1	(Hong Kong) (Malaysia)	Coleman Wong; Koay Hao-sheng	6; 3	6; 1
2	(Hong Kong) (Malaysia)	Wong Hong-kit; Syed Mohd Agil Syed Naguib	3; 6	6; 1	6; 2
3	(Hong Kong) (Malaysia)	Coleman Wong / Wong Hong-kit; Imran Daniel Abdul Hazli / Koay Hao-sheng	6; 3	6; 4

==== Hong Kong vs. Kuwait ====
Hong Kong
2
Jordan Tennis Federation, Amman, Jordan
16 September 2021
Hard

Kuwait
1

			1	2	3
1	(Hong Kong) (Kuwait)	Coleman Wong; Abdulhamid Mubarak	6; 4	6; 2
2	(Hong Kong) (Kuwait)	Wong Hong-kit; Essa Qabazard	6; 4	6; 3
3	(Hong Kong) (Kuwait)	Ng Ki-lung / Wong Hong-kit; Bader Alabdullah / Essa Qabazard	3; 6	5; 7

==== Kuwait vs. Malaysia ====
Kuwait
0
Jordan Tennis Federation, Amman, Jordan
17 September 2021
Hard

Malaysia
3

			1	2	3
1	(Kuwait) (Malaysia)	Abdulhamid Mubarak; Koay Hao-sheng	7; 5	2; 6	4; 6
2	(Kuwait) (Malaysia)	Essa Qabazard; Naufal Siddiq Kamaruzzaman	6^{5} 7^{7}	4; 6
3	(Kuwait) (Malaysia)	Bader Alabdullah / Abdulrahman Alawadhi; Imran Daniel Abdul Hazli / Syed Mohd Agil Syed Naguib	6^{4} 7^{7}	5; 7

=== Pool B ===
==== Vietnam vs. Pacific Oceania ====
Vietnam
2
Jordan Tennis Federation, Amman, Jordan
15 September 2021
Hard

Pacific Oceania
1

			1	2	3
1	(Vietnam) (Pacific Oceania)	Trịnh Linh Giang; Clément Mainguy	4; 6	6; 3	7; 5
2	(Vietnam) (Pacific Oceania)	Lý Hoàng Nam; Colin Sinclair	4; 6	6; 4	4; 6
3	(Vietnam) (Pacific Oceania)	Lê Quốc Khánh / Lý Hoàng Nam; Brett Baudinet / Colin Sinclair	6; 4	3; 6	6; 3

==== Vietnam vs. Qatar ====
Vietnam
2
Jordan Tennis Federation, Amman, Jordan
16 September 2021
Hard

Qatar
1

			1	2	3
1	(Vietnam) (Qatar)	Vũ Hà Minh Đức; Rashed Nawaf	4; 6	4; 6
2	(Vietnam) (Qatar)	Lý Hoàng Nam; Mashari Nawaf	6; 1	6; 0
3	(Vietnam) (Qatar)	Lê Quốc Khánh / Lý Hoàng Nam; Rashed Nawaf / Mousa Shanan Zayed	6; 3	6; 4

==== Qatar vs. Pacific Oceania ====
Qatar
1
Jordan Tennis Federation, Amman, Jordan
17 September 2021
Hard

Pacific Oceania
2

			1	2	3
1	(Qatar) (Pacific Oceania)	Rashed Nawaf; Clément Mainguy	3; 6	5; 7
2	(Qatar) (Pacific Oceania)	Mousa Shanan Zayed; Colin Sinclair	1; 6	0; 6
3	(Qatar) (Pacific Oceania)	Sultan Al-Alawi / Mousa Shanan Zayed; Brett Baudinet / Heimanarii Lai San	6; 0	6; 2

=== Pool C ===
==== Syria vs. Jordan ====
Syria
3
Jordan Tennis Federation, Amman, Jordan
15 September 2021
Hard

Jordan
0

			1	2	3
1	(Syria) (Jordan)	Amer Naow; Seif Adas	6; 3	6; 4
2	(Syria) (Jordan)	Kareem Al Allaf; Mousa Alkotop	6; 2	6; 0
3	(Syria) (Jordan)	Kareem Al Allaf / Yacoub Makzoume; Hamzeh Al-Aswad / Mousa Alkotop	6; 2	6; 2

==== Syria vs. Sri Lanka ====
Syria
3
Jordan Tennis Federation, Amman, Jordan
16 September 2021
Hard

Sri Lanka
0

			1	2	3
1	(Syria) (Sri Lanka)	Yacoub Makzoume; Yasitha de Silva	6; 4	2; 6	7^{7} 6^{4}
2	(Syria) (Sri Lanka)	Kareem Al Allaf; Thehan Sanjaya Wijemanne	6; 0	6; 4
3	(Syria) (Sri Lanka)	Kareem Al Allaf / Amer Naow; Chathurya Nilaweera / Thehan Sanjaya Wijemanne	6; 4	7^{9} 6^{7}

==== Sri Lanka vs. Jordan ====
Sri Lanka
1
Jordan Tennis Federation, Amman, Jordan
17 September 2021
Hard

Jordan
2

			1	2	3
1	(Sri Lanka) (Jordan)	Yasitha de Silva; Seif Adas	6; 4	7^{7} 6^{4}
2	(Sri Lanka) (Jordan)	Chathurya Nilaweera; Mousa Alkotop	2; 6	6; 3	5; 7
3	(Sri Lanka) (Jordan)	Yasitha de Silva / Thehan Sanjaya Wijemanne; Hamzeh Al-Aswad / Mousa Alkotop	6^{3} 7^{7}	4; 6

=== Promotional play-offs ===
==== Hong Kong vs. Jordan ====
Hong Kong
2
Jordan Tennis Federation, Amman, Jordan
18 September 2021
Hard

Jordan
0

			1	2	3
1	(Hong Kong) (Jordan)	Coleman Wong; Seif Adas	6; 2	6; 1
2	(Hong Kong) (Jordan)	Wong Hong-kit; Mousa Alkotop	6; 4	6; 1
3	(Hong Kong) (Jordan)	Coleman Wong / Wong Hong-kit; Hamzeh Al-Aswad / Mousa Alkotop				not played

==== Vietnam vs. Malaysia ====
Vietnam
2
Jordan Tennis Federation, Amman, Jordan
18 September 2021
Hard

Malaysia
0

			1	2	3
1	(Vietnam) (Malaysia)	Trịnh Linh Giang; Koay Hao-sheng	6; 3	7; 5
2	(Vietnam) (Malaysia)	Lý Hoàng Nam; Imran Daniel Abdul Hazli	6; 3	6; 2
3	(Vietnam) (Malaysia)	Lê Quốc Khánh / Lý Hoàng Nam; Koay Hao-sheng / Syed Mohd Agil Syed Naguib				not played

==== Syria vs. Pacific Oceania ====
Syria
1
Jordan Tennis Federation, Amman, Jordan
18 September 2021
Hard

Pacific Oceania
2

			1	2	3
1	(Syria) (Pacific Oceania)	Hazem Naw; Clément Mainguy	6; 2	6; 1
2	(Syria) (Pacific Oceania)	Kareem Al Allaf; Colin Sinclair	5; 7	7^{9} 6^{7}	4; 6
3	(Syria) (Pacific Oceania)	Kareem Al Allaf / Hazem Naw; Brett Baudinet / Colin Sinclair	3; 6	7^{7} 6^{2}	4; 6

== Final placements ==
Placing	Teams		
Promoted/First	Hong Kong	Vietnam	Pacific Oceania
Fourth	Jordan	Malaysia	Syria
Relegated/Seventh	Kuwait	Qatar	Sri Lanka

- Hong Kong, Vietnam and Pacific Oceania were promoted to 2022 Davis Cup World Group II Play-offs.
- Kuwait, Qatar and Sri Lanka were relegated to 2022 Davis Cup Asia/Oceania Zone Group IV.
