= 2018 Davis Cup Asia/Oceania Zone Group III =

International tennis competition

The Asia/Oceania Zone was the unique zone within Group 3 of the regional Davis Cup competition in 2018. The zone's competition was held in round robin format in Hanoi, Vietnam, from 2 to 7 April 2018. The two winning nations won promotion to Group II, Asia/Oceania Zone, for 2019.

== Participating nations ==
- Cambodia
- Jordan
- Kuwait
- Malaysia
- Pacific Oceania
- Qatar
- Saudi Arabia
- Syria
- Vietnam (Host)

== Draw ==
Date: 2–7 April, 2018

Location: Mỹ Đình Sports Complex, Hanoi, Vietnam (indoor hard)

Format: Round-robin basis. One pool of 4 teams (Pool A) and one pool of 5 teams (Pool B). The winner of Pool A will play-off against the runner-up of Pool B and the winner of Pool B will play-off against the runner-up of Pool A to determine which two nations will be promoted to Asia/Oceania Zone Group II in 2019.

=== Seeding ===
Pot	Nation	Rank^{1}	Seed
1	Vietnam	67	1
1	Kuwait	73	2
2	Qatar	86	3
2	Malaysia	91	4
3	Syria	92	5
3	Pacific Oceania	93	6
4	Jordan	99	7
4	Cambodia	103	8
4	Saudi Arabia	114	9

- ^{1}Davis Cup Rankings as of 5 February 2018

=== Draw ===
==== Pool A ====
		VIE	MAS	CAM	POC	RR; W–L	Set; W–L	Game; W–L	Standings
1	Vietnam		3–0	3–0	2–1	3–0	17–3 (85%)	113–48 (70%)	1
4	Malaysia	0–3		3–0	2–1	2–1	12–9 (57%)	103–95 (52%)	2
8	Cambodia	0–3	0–3		2–1	1–2	6–15 (29%)	77–112 (41%)	3
6	Pacific Oceania	1–2	1–2	1–2		0–3	7–15 (32%)	83–121 (41%)	4

==== Pool B ====
		KUW	QAT	SYR	JOR	KSA	RR; W–L	Set; W–L	Game; W–L	Standings
2	Kuwait		2–1	2–1	3–0	3–0	4–0	20–5 (80%)	144–90 (62%)	1
3	Qatar	1–2		3–0	2–1	3–0	3–1	19–8 (70%)	145–102 (59%)	2
5	Syria	1–2	0–3		2–1	2–1	2–2	12–16 (43%)	113–139 (45%)	3
7	Jordan	0–3	1–2	1–2		3–0	1–3	12–16 (43%)	126–128 (50%)	4
9	Saudi Arabia	0–3	0–3	1–2	0–3		0–4	5–23 (18%)	87–156 (36%)	5

Standings are determined by: 1. number of wins; 2. number of matches; 3. in two-team ties, head-to-head records; 4. in three-team ties, (a) percentage of sets won (head-to-head records if two teams remain tied), then (b) percentage of games won (head-to-head records if two teams remain tied), then (c) Davis Cup rankings.

=== Playoffs ===
Placing	A Team	Score	B Team
Promotional	Vietnam	3–0	Qatar
Promotional	Malaysia	0–2	Kuwait
5th	—N/a		Syria
Relegation	Cambodia	0–3	Saudi Arabia
Relegation	Pacific Oceania	2–1	Jordan

- Vietnam and Kuwait promoted to Group II in 2019.
- Cambodia and Jordan relegated to Group IV in 2019.

== Round Robin ==
=== Pool A ===
==== Vietnam vs. Pacific Oceania ====
Vietnam
2
Mỹ Đình Sports Complex, Hanoi, Vietnam
3 April
Hard (indoor)

Pacific Oceania
1

			1	2	3
1	(Vietnam) (Pacific Oceania)	Trịnh Linh Giang; Heve Kelley	6; 0	6; 2
2	(Vietnam) (Pacific Oceania)	Lý Hoàng Nam; Matthew Stubbings	6; 3	6; 1
3	(Vietnam) (Pacific Oceania)	Phạm Minh Tuấn / Lê Quốc Khánh; Brett Baudinet / Colin Sinclair	6; 1	3; 6	3; 6

==== Malaysia vs. Cambodia ====
Malaysia
3
Mỹ Đình Sports Complex, Hanoi, Vietnam
3 April
Hard (indoor)

Cambodia
0

			1	2	3
1	(Malaysia) (Cambodia)	Ahmed Deedat Abdul Razak; Kim Delton	6; 1	6; 2
2	(Malaysia) (Cambodia)	Christian Didier Chin; Bun Kenny	7; 5	3; 6	7^{8} 6^{6}
3	(Malaysia) (Cambodia)	Syed Mohd Agil Syed Naguib / Muhammad-Ashaari bin Zainal-Abidin; Kim Delton / Mam Phalkun	6; 3	6; 2

==== Vietnam vs. Cambodia ====
Vietnam
3
Mỹ Đình Sports Complex, Hanoi, Vietnam
4 April
Hard (indoor)

Cambodia
0

			1	2	3
1	(Vietnam) (Cambodia)	Trịnh Linh Giang; Kim Delton	6; 0	6; 1
2	(Vietnam) (Cambodia)	Lý Hoàng Nam; Long Samneang	6; 1	6; 1
3	(Vietnam) (Cambodia)	Phạm Minh Tuấn / Lê Quốc Khánh; Kim Delton / Mam Phalkun	6; 1	6; 4

==== Malaysia vs. Pacific Oceania ====
Malaysia
2
Mỹ Đình Sports Complex, Hanoi, Vietnam
4 April
Hard (indoor)

Pacific Oceania
1

			1	2	3
1	(Malaysia) (Pacific Oceania)	Ahmed Deedat Abdul Razak; Matthew Stubbings	7^{7} 6^{5}	7; 5
2	(Malaysia) (Pacific Oceania)	Christian Didier Chin; Colin Sinclair	6; 3	6; 2
3	(Malaysia) (Pacific Oceania)	Syed Mohd Agil Syed Naguib / Muhammad-Ashaari bin Zainal-Abidin; Brett Baudinet / Matthew Stubbings	5; 7	6; 0	4; 6

==== Vietnam vs. Malaysia ====
Vietnam
3
Mỹ Đình Sports Complex, Hanoi, Vietnam
5 April
Hard (indoor)

Malaysia
0

			1	2	3
1	(Vietnam) (Malaysia)	Trịnh Linh Giang; Christian Didier Chin	6; 4	6; 0
2	(Vietnam) (Malaysia)	Lý Hoàng Nam; Muhammad-Ashaari bin Zainal-Abidin	6; 0	6; 1
3	(Vietnam) (Malaysia)	Phạm Minh Tuấn / Lê Quốc Khánh; Ahmed Deedat Abdul Razak / Syed Mohd Agil Syed Naguib	7^{7} 6^{5}	4; 6	6; 4

==== Pacific Oceania vs. Cambodia ====
Pacific Oceania
1
Mỹ Đình Sports Complex, Hanoi, Vietnam
5 April
Hard (indoor)

Cambodia
2

			1	2	3
1	(Pacific Oceania) (Cambodia)	Heve Kelley; Kim Delton	7; 5	2; 6	4; 6
2	(Pacific Oceania) (Cambodia)	Matthew Stubbings; Long Samneang	4; 6	0; 6
3	(Pacific Oceania) (Cambodia)	Brett Baudinet / Heve Kelley; Long Samneang / Mam Phalkun	6^{3} 7^{7}	6; 4	6; 4

=== Pool B ===
==== Kuwait vs. Jordan ====
Kuwait
3
Mỹ Đình Sports Complex, Hanoi, Vietnam
2 April
Hard (indoor)

Jordan
0

			1	2	3
1	(Kuwait) (Jordan)	Mohammad Ghareeb; Mousa Alkotop	6; 4	6; 2
2	(Kuwait) (Jordan)	Abdullah Maqdes; Seif Adas	7^{7} 6^{1}	6; 3
3	(Kuwait) (Jordan)	Mohammad Ghareeb / Abdullah Maqdes; Hamzeh Al-Aswad / Mousa Alkotop	6; 3	6; 2

==== Qatar vs. Syria ====
Qatar
3
Mỹ Đình Sports Complex, Hanoi, Vietnam
2 April
Hard (indoor)

Syria
0

			1	2	3
1	(Qatar) (Syria)	Jabor Al-Mutawa; Rabee Sleem	6; 1	6; 2
2	(Qatar) (Syria)	Mubarak Shannan Zayid; Yacoub Makzoume	6; 2	2; 6	6; 3
3	(Qatar) (Syria)	Issa Shanan Al Harrasi / Mousa Shanan Zayed; Yacoub Makzoume / Rabee Sleem	6; 4	7^{7} 6^{3}

==== Kuwait vs. Saudi Arabia ====
Kuwait
3
Mỹ Đình Sports Complex, Hanoi, Vietnam
3 April
Hard (indoor)

Saudi Arabia
0

			1	2	3
1	(Kuwait) (Saudi Arabia)	Mohammad Ghareeb; Saud Alhaqbani	7; 5	6; 1
2	(Kuwait) (Saudi Arabia)	Abdullah Maqdes; Ammar Alhaqbani	3; 6	6; 4	6; 1
3	(Kuwait) (Saudi Arabia)	Mohammed Ghareeb / Abdullah Maqdes; Fahad Al Saad / Faisal Alrebdi	6; 3	6; 4

==== Qatar vs. Jordan ====
Qatar
2
Mỹ Đình Sports Complex, Hanoi, Vietnam
3 April
Hard (indoor)

Jordan
1

			1	2	3
1	(Qatar) (Jordan)	Jabor Al-Mutawa; Mousa Alkotop	4; 6	6; 2	6; 3
2	(Qatar) (Jordan)	Mubarak Shannan Zayid; Seif Adas	6; 2	6; 4
3	(Qatar) (Jordan)	Issa Shanan Al Harrasi / Mousa Shanan Zayed; Hamzeh Al-Aswad / Mousa Alkotop	5; 7	6; 4	6^{2} 7^{7}

==== Kuwait vs. Qatar ====
Kuwait
2
Mỹ Đình Sports Complex, Hanoi, Vietnam
4 April
Hard (indoor)

Qatar
1

			1	2	3
1	(Kuwait) (Qatar)	Mohammad Ghareeb; Mousa Shanan Zayed	7; 5	6; 0
2	(Kuwait) (Qatar)	Abdullah Maqdes; Mubarak Shannan Zayid	6^{1} 7^{7}	2; 6
3	(Kuwait) (Qatar)	Mohammed Ghareeb / Abdullah Maqdes; Mousa Shanan Zayed / Mubarak Shannan Zayid	6; 2	7; 5

==== Syria vs. Saudi Arabia ====
Syria
2
Mỹ Đình Sports Complex, Hanoi, Vietnam
4 April
Hard (indoor)

Saudi Arabia
1

			1	2	3
1	(Syria) (Saudi Arabia)	Rabee Sleem; Faisal Alrebdi	6; 4	6; 4
2	(Syria) (Saudi Arabia)	Yacoub Makzoume; Ammar Alhaqbani	5; 7	6; 2	3; 6
3	(Syria) (Saudi Arabia)	Yacoub Makzoume / Rabee Sleem; Fahad Al Saad / Ammar Alhaqbani	6; 4	3; 6	6; 2

==== Kuwait vs. Syria ====
Kuwait
2
Mỹ Đình Sports Complex, Hanoi, Vietnam
5 April
Hard (indoor)

Syria
1

			1	2	3
1	(Kuwait) (Syria)	Mohammad Ghareeb; Rabee Sleem	6; 1	6; 3
2	(Kuwait) (Syria)	Abdullah Maqdes; Yacoub Makzoume	5; 7	4; 6
3	(Kuwait) (Syria)	Mohammad Ghareeb / Abdullah Maqdes; Yacoub Makzoume / Rabee Sleem	6; 3	6; 1

==== Jordan vs. Saudi Arabia ====
Jordan
3
Mỹ Đình Sports Complex, Hanoi, Vietnam
5 April
Hard (indoor)

Saudi Arabia
0

			1	2	3
1	(Jordan) (Saudi Arabia)	Mousa Alkotop; Saud Alhaqbani	6; 0	6; 1
2	(Jordan) (Saudi Arabia)	Seif Adas; Ammar Alhaqbani	6; 4	3; 6	6; 4
3	(Jordan) (Saudi Arabia)	Hamzeh Al-Aswad / Mousa Alkotop; Faisal Alrebdi / Saud Alhaqbani	6; 2	6; 2

==== Qatar vs. Saudi Arabia ====
Qatar
3
Mỹ Đình Sports Complex, Hanoi, Vietnam
6 April
Hard (indoor)

Saudi Arabia
0

			1	2	3
1	(Qatar) (Saudi Arabia)	Jabor Al-Mutawa; Saud Alhaqbani	6; 4	6; 2
2	(Qatar) (Saudi Arabia)	Mubarak Shannan Zayid; Fahad Al Saad	6; 2	6; 1
3	(Qatar) (Saudi Arabia)	Issa Shanan Al Harrasi / Mousa Shanan Zayed; Fahad Al Saad / Faisal Alrebdi				w/o

==== Syria vs. Jordan ====
Syria
2
Mỹ Đình Sports Complex, Hanoi, Vietnam
6 April
Hard (indoor)

Jordan
1

			1	2	3
1	(Syria) (Jordan)	Rabee Sleem; Mousa Alkotop	0; 6	0; 6
2	(Syria) (Jordan)	Yacoub Makzoume; Seif Adas	6; 3	6; 3
3	(Syria) (Jordan)	Yacoub Makzoume / Rabee Sleem; Hamzeh Al-Aswad / Mousa Alkotop	6; 4	3; 6	6; 4

== Play-offs ==
=== Promotional play-offs ===
==== Vietnam vs. Qatar ====
Vietnam
3
Mỹ Đình Sports Complex, Hanoi, Vietnam
7 April
Hard (indoor)

Qatar
0

			1	2	3
1	(Vietnam) (Qatar)	Trịnh Linh Giang; Jabor Al-Mutawa	6; 4	7; 5
2	(Vietnam) (Qatar)	Lý Hoàng Nam; Mubarak Shannan Zayid	6; 4	7^{7} 6^{2}
3	(Vietnam) (Qatar)	Phạm Minh Tuấn / Lê Quốc Khánh; Issa Shanan Al Harrasi / Mousa Shanan Zayed	6; 3	6; 2

==== Malaysia vs. Kuwait ====
Malaysia
0
Mỹ Đình Sports Complex, Hanoi, Vietnam
7 April
Hard (indoor)

Kuwait
2

			1	2	3
1	(Malaysia) (Kuwait)	Syed Mohd Agil Syed Naguib; Mohammad Ghareeb	3; 6	3; 6
2	(Malaysia) (Kuwait)	Christian Didier Chin; Abdullah Maqdes	6; 3	3; 6	5; 7
3	(Malaysia) (Kuwait)	Muhammad-Ashaari bin Zainal-Abidin / Syed Mohd Agil Syed Naguib; Mohammad Ghareeb / Abdullah Maqdes				not played

=== Relegation play-offs ===
==== Cambodia vs. Saudi Arabia ====
Cambodia
0
Mỹ Đình Sports Complex, Hanoi, Vietnam
7 April
Hard (indoor)

Saudi Arabia
3

			1	2	3
1	(Cambodia) (Saudi Arabia)	Kim Delton; Saud Alhaqbani	6; 4	1; 6	2; 6
2	(Cambodia) (Saudi Arabia)	Long Samneang; Ammar Alhaqbani	1; 6	2; 6
3	(Cambodia) (Saudi Arabia)	Long Samneang / Mam Phalkun; Ammar Alhaqbani / Saud Alhaqbani				w/o

==== Jordan vs. Pacific Oceania ====
Jordan
1
Mỹ Đình Sports Complex, Hanoi, Vietnam
7 April
Hard (indoor)

Pacific Oceania
2

			1	2	3
1	(Jordan) (Pacific Oceania)	Mousa Alkotop; Heve Kelley	6; 3	6; 1
2	(Jordan) (Pacific Oceania)	Seif Adas; Matthew Stubbings	5; 7	2; 6
3	(Jordan) (Pacific Oceania)	Hamzeh Al-Aswad / Mousa Alkotop; Brett Baudinet / Matthew Stubbings	6; 2	6^{5} 7^{7}	4; 6
