= 2019 Davis Cup Asia/Oceania Zone Group III =

International tennis competition

The Asia/Oceania Zone was the unique zone within Group 3 of the regional Davis Cup competition in 2019. The zone's competition was held in round robin format in Singapore, from 26 to 29 June 2019.

== Participating nations ==
- Iran
- Kuwait
- Malaysia
- Qatar
- Singapore
- Sri Lanka
- Syria
- Vietnam

== Draw ==
Date: 26–29 June

Location: Singapore Sports Hub, Singapore (indoor hard)

Format: Round-robin basis.

=== Seeding ===
Pot	Nation	Rank^{1}	Seed
1	Vietnam	66	1
1	Iran	72	2
2	Kuwait	73	3
2	Qatar	83	4
3	Sri Lanka	87	5
3	Syria	92	6
4	Malaysia	96	7
4	Singapore	100	8

- ^{1}Davis Cup Rankings as of 4 February 2019

=== Round Robin ===
==== Pool A ====
		VIE	SRI	KUW	SGP	RR; W–L	Set; W–L	Game; W–L	Standings
1	Vietnam		3–0	3–0	2–1	3–0	17–4 (81%)	120–63 (66%)	1
5	Sri Lanka	0–3		2–1	2–1	2–1	9–11 (45%)	88–99 (47%)	2
3	Kuwait	0–3	1–2		2–1	1–2	7–14 (33%)	84–110 (43%)	3
8	Singapore	1–2	1–2	1–2		0–3	9–13 (41%)	90–110 (45%)	4

==== Pool B ====
		SYR	QAT	MAS	IRI	RR; W–L	Set; W–L	Game; W–L	Standings
6	Syria		3–0	2–1	3–0	3–0	17–3 (85%)	113–61 (65%)	1
4	Qatar	0–3		2–1	2–1	2–1	10–11 (48%)	90–92 (49%)	2
7	Malaysia	1–2	1–2		3–0	1–2	11–11 (50%)	99–106 (48%)	3
2	Iran	0–3	1–2	0–3		0–3	3–16 (16%)	69–112 (38%)	4

Standings are determined by: 1. number of wins; 2. number of matches; 3. in two-team ties, head-to-head records; 4. in three-team ties, (a) percentage of sets won (head-to-head records if two teams remain tied), then (b) percentage of games won (head-to-head records if two teams remain tied), then (c) Davis Cup rankings.

=== Playoffs ===
Placing	A Team	Score	B Team
1st–2nd	Vietnam	2–0	Syria
3rd–4th	Sri Lanka	2–1	Qatar
5th–6th	Kuwait	2–1	Malaysia
7th–8th	Singapore	2–1	Iran

== Round Robin ==
=== Pool A ===
==== Vietnam vs. Sri Lanka ====
Vietnam
3
Singapore Sports Hub, Singapore
26 June
Hard (i)

Sri Lanka
0

			1	2	3
1	(Vietnam) (Sri Lanka)	Trịnh Linh Giang; Dineshkanthan Thangarajah	6; 2	6; 3
2	(Vietnam) (Sri Lanka)	Lý Hoàng Nam; Harshana Godamanna	3; 6	6; 4	7^{7} 6^{2}
3	(Vietnam) (Sri Lanka)	Lê Quốc Khánh / Phạm Minh Tuấn; Dineshkanthan Thangarajah / Savit Weerasinghe	6; 1	6; 2

==== Kuwait vs. Singapore ====
Kuwait
2
Singapore Sports Hub, Singapore
26 June
Hard (i)

Singapore
1

			1	2	3
1	(Kuwait) (Singapore)	Abdullah Maqdes; Shaheed Alam	6; 2	6^{9} 7^{11}	6; 2
2	(Kuwait) (Singapore)	Mohammad Ghareeb; Ng Hao-yuan	7; 5	4; 6	6; 2
3	(Kuwait) (Singapore)	Abdulrahman Alawadhi / Essa Qabazard; Jensen Hiu / Roy Hobbs	3; 6	2; 6

==== Vietnam vs. Singapore ====
Vietnam
2
Singapore Sports Hub, Singapore
27 June
Hard (i)

Singapore
1

			1	2	3
1	(Vietnam) (Singapore)	Trịnh Linh Giang; Shaheed Alam	6; 2	6; 1
2	(Vietnam) (Singapore)	Lý Hoàng Nam; Ng Hao-yuan	6; 1	6; 1
3	(Vietnam) (Singapore)	Lê Quốc Khánh / Phạm Minh Tuấn; Shaheed Alam / Ng Hao-yuan	4; 6	6; 3	4; 6

==== Kuwait vs. Sri Lanka ====
Kuwait
1
Singapore Sports Hub, Singapore
27 June
Hard (i)

Sri Lanka
2

			1	2	3
1	(Kuwait) (Sri Lanka)	Abdullah Maqdes; Dineshkanthan Thangarajah	6; 3	6; 4
2	(Kuwait) (Sri Lanka)	Mohammad Ghareeb; Harshana Godamanna	3; 6	1; 6
3	(Kuwait) (Sri Lanka)	Mohammad Ghareeb / Abdullah Maqdes; Harshana Godamanna / Dineshkanthan Thangarajah	6^{5} 7^{7}	3; 6

==== Vietnam vs. Kuwait ====
Vietnam
3
Singapore Sports Hub, Singapore
28 June
Hard (i)

Kuwait
0

			1	2	3
1	(Vietnam) (Kuwait)	Trịnh Linh Giang; Abdullah Maqdes	6; 3	7; 5
2	(Vietnam) (Kuwait)	Lý Hoàng Nam; Abdulrahman Alawadhi	6; 0	6; 1
3	(Vietnam) (Kuwait)	Lê Quốc Khánh / Lý Hoàng Nam; Mohammad Ghareeb / Abdullah Maqdes	6; 2	5; 7	6; 1

==== Sri Lanka vs. Singapore ====
Sri Lanka
2
Singapore Sports Hub, Singapore
28 June
Hard (i)

Singapore
1

			1	2	3
1	(Sri Lanka) (Singapore)	Dineshkanthan Thangarajah; Shaheed Alam	4; 6	1; 6
2	(Sri Lanka) (Singapore)	Harshana Godamanna; Ng Hao-yuan	6; 2	6; 3
3	(Sri Lanka) (Singapore)	Harshana Godamanna / Dineshkanthan Thangarajah; Shaheed Alam / Ng Hao-yuan	1; 6	7^{10} 6^{8}	7; 5

=== Pool B ===
==== Iran vs. Syria ====
Iran
0
Singapore Sports Hub, Singapore
26 June
Hard (i)

Syria
3

			1	2	3
1	(Iran) (Syria)	Mahdi Souri; Yacoub Makzoume	6^{5} 7^{7}	2; 6
2	(Iran) (Syria)	Shahin Khaledan; Kareem Al Allaf	2; 6	5; 7
3	(Iran) (Syria)	Hesam Esmail Yazdi / Kiarash Souri; Kareem Al Allaf / Yacoub Makzoume	3; 6	1; 6

==== Qatar vs. Malaysia ====
Qatar
2
Singapore Sports Hub, Singapore
26 June
Hard (i)

Malaysia
1

			1	2	3
1	(Qatar) (Malaysia)	Mousa Shanan Zayed; Christian Didier Chin	7; 5	6; 2
2	(Qatar) (Malaysia)	Mubarak Shannan Zayid; Shamirul Shahril Mohd Adam Das	7; 5	5; 7	6; 1
3	(Qatar) (Malaysia)	Rayane Alami / Mousa Shanan Zayed; Christian Didier Chin / Syed Mohd Agil Syed Naguib	0; 6	6; 2	2; 6

==== Iran vs. Malaysia ====
Iran
0
Singapore Sports Hub, Singapore
27 June
Hard (i)

Malaysia
3

			1	2	3
1	(Iran) (Malaysia)	Hesam Esmail Yazdi; Syed Mohd Agil Syed Naguib	2; 6	3; 6
2	(Iran) (Malaysia)	Shahin Khaledan; Shamirul Shahril Mohd Adam Das	7^{7} 6^{2}	6^{5} 7^{7}	3; 6
3	(Iran) (Malaysia)	Kiarash Souri / Mahdi Souri; Christian Didier Chin / Syed Mohd Agil Syed Naguib	3; 6	5; 7

==== Qatar vs. Syria ====
Qatar
0
Singapore Sports Hub, Singapore
27 June
Hard (i)

Syria
3

			1	2	3
1	(Qatar) (Syria)	Mousa Shanan Zayed; Yacoub Makzoume	6; 1	3; 6	2; 6
2	(Qatar) (Syria)	Mubarak Shannan Zayid; Kareem Al Allaf	3; 6	1; 6
3	(Qatar) (Syria)	Rashed Nawaf / Mousa Shanan Zayed; Kareem Al Allaf / Majdi Salim	3; 6	3; 6

==== Iran vs. Qatar ====
Iran
1
Singapore Sports Hub, Singapore
28 June
Hard (i)

Qatar
2

			1	2	3
1	(Iran) (Qatar)	Mahdi Souri; Mousa Shanan Zayed	0; 6	1; 6
2	(Iran) (Qatar)	Shahin Khaledan; Mubarak Shannan Zayid	6^{6} 7^{8}	2; 6
3	(Iran) (Qatar)	Shahin Khaledan / Kiarash Souri; Rayane Alami / Rashed Nawaf	6; 2	6; 3

==== Syria vs. Malaysia ====
Syria
2
Singapore Sports Hub, Singapore
28 June
Hard (i)

Malaysia
1

			1	2	3
1	(Syria) (Malaysia)	Yacoub Makzoume; Christian Didier Chin	3; 6	6; 1	4; 6
2	(Syria) (Malaysia)	Kareem Al Allaf; Shamirul Shahril Mohd Adam Das	6; 0	6; 1
3	(Syria) (Malaysia)	Kareem Al Allaf / Yacoub Makzoume; Christian Didier Chin / Shamirul Shahril Mohd Adam Das	6; 2	7; 5

== Playoffs ==
=== 1st to 2nd playoff ===
==== Vietnam vs. Syria ====
Vietnam
2
Singapore Sports Hub, Singapore
29 June
Hard (i)

Syria
0

			1	2	3
1	(Vietnam) (Syria)	Trịnh Linh Giang; Yacoub Makzoume	7^{7} 6^{3}	7^{9} 6^{7}
2	(Vietnam) (Syria)	Lý Hoàng Nam; Kareem Al Allaf	6^{6} 7^{8}	6; 1	6; 0
3	(Vietnam) (Syria)	Lê Quốc Khánh / Lý Hoàng Nam; Kareem Al Allaf / Yacoub Makzoume				not played

=== 3rd to 4th playoff ===
==== Sri Lanka vs. Qatar ====
Sri Lanka
2
Singapore Sports Hub, Singapore
29 June
Hard (i)

Qatar
1

			1	2	3
1	(Sri Lanka) (Qatar)	Savit Weerasinghe; Mousa Shanan Zayed	4; 6	2; 6
2	(Sri Lanka) (Qatar)	Harshana Godamanna; Mubarak Shannan Zayid	6; 1	2; 6	7; 5
3	(Sri Lanka) (Qatar)	Harshana Godamanna / Dineshkanthan Thangarajah; Mousa Shanan Zayed / Mubarak Shannan Zayid	3; 6	6; 3	6; 4

=== 5th to 6th playoff ===
==== Kuwait vs. Malaysia ====
Kuwait
2
Singapore Sports Hub, Singapore
29 June
Hard (i)

Malaysia
1

			1	2	3
1	(Kuwait) (Malaysia)	Essa Qabazard; Naufal Siddiq Kamaruzzaman	2; 6	2; 6
2	(Kuwait) (Malaysia)	Abdullah Maqdes; Shamirul Shahril Mohd Adam Das	6; 1	4; 6	6; 2
3	(Kuwait) (Malaysia)	Mohammad Ghareeb / Abdullah Maqdes; Shamirul Shahril Mohd Adam Das / Syed Mohd Agil Syed Naguib	6; 3	6; 4

=== 7th to 8th playoff ===
==== Singapore vs. Iran ====
Singapore
2
Singapore Sports Hub, Singapore
29 June
Hard (i)

Iran
1

			1	2	3
1	(Singapore) (Iran)	Shaheed Alam; Hesam Esmail Yazdi	6; 3	6; 2
2	(Singapore) (Iran)	Ng Hao-yuan; Shahin Khaledan	6; 4	6^{3} 7^{7}	6^{2} 7^{7}
3	(Singapore) (Iran)	Shaheed Alam / Roy Hobbs; Shahin Khaledan / Kiarash Souri	6; 3	6; 2
