= 2023 Davis Cup Asia/Oceania Zone Group IV =

Davis Cup competition in 2023

The Asia/Oceania Zone was the unique zone within Group 4 of the regional Davis Cup competition in 2023. The zone's competition was held in round robin format in Antalya, Turkey from 18 to 21 October 2023.

== Participating nations ==
- Guam
- Iraq
- Kuwait
- Kyrgyzstan
- Singapore
- Syria
- Turkmenistan
- United Arab Emirates

== Draw ==
Date: 18–21 October 2023

Location: Megasaray Tennis Academy, Antalya, Turkey (Clay)

Format: Round-robin basis. Two pools of four teams and nations will play each team once in their pool. Nations finishing in the top two of each pool will enter promotional play-offs, with the first of Pool A facing the second of Pool B and the first of Pool B facing the second of Pool A, and the two winners will be promoted to Asia/Oceania Zone Group III in 2024.

Nations finishing in the bottom two of each pool will enter relegation play-offs, with the third of Pool A facing the fourth of Pool B and the third of Pool B facing the fourth of Pool A, and the two lost teams will be relegated to Asia/Oceania Zone Group V in 2024.

=== Seeding ===
Pot	Nation	Rank^{1}	Seed
1	Syria		
1	Kuwait		
2	Iraq		
2	Turkmenistan		
3	United Arab Emirates		
3	Kyrgyzstan		
4	Singapore		
4	Guam		

- ^{1}Davis Cup Rankings as of

=== Round Robin ===
==== Pool A ====
	SYR	SGP	UAE	IRQ	RR; W–L	Set; W–L	Game; W–L	Standings
Syria		2–1	3–0	3–0	3–0	8–1 (%)	– (%)	1
Singapore	1–2		3–0	3–0	2–1	7–2 (%)	– (%)	2
United Arab Emirates	0–3	0–3		2–1	1–2	2–7 (%)	– (%)	3
Iraq	0–3	0–3	1–2		0–3	1–8 (%)	– (%)	4

==== Pool B ====
	KGZ	KUW	GUM	TKM	RR; W–L	Set; W–L	Game; W–L	Standings
Kyrgyzstan		3–0	3–0	3–0	3–0	9–0 (%)	– (%)	1
Kuwait	0–3		3–0	3–0	2–1	6–3 (%)	– (%)	2
Guam	0–3	0–3		2–1	1–2	2–7 (%)	– (%)	3
Turkmenistan	0–3	0–3	1–2		0–3	1–8 (%)	– (%)	4

Standings are determined by: 1. number of wins; 2. number of matches; 3. in two-team ties, head-to-head records; 4. in three-team ties, (a) percentage of sets won (head-to-head records if two teams remain tied), then (b) percentage of games won (head-to-head records if two teams remain tied), then (c) Davis Cup rankings.

=== Playoffs ===
Placing	A Team	Score	B Team
Promotional	Syria	2–0	Kuwait
Promotional	Kyrgyzstan	0–2	Singapore
Relegation	United Arab Emirates	2–1	Turkmenistan
Relegation	Guam	0–2	Iraq

- Singapore and Syria were promoted to 2024 Davis Cup Asia/Oceania Zone Group III.
- Guam and Turkmenistan were relegated to 2024 Davis Cup Asia/Oceania Zone Group V.

== Round Robin ==
=== Pool A ===
==== Syria vs. Singapore ====
Syria
2
Megasaray Tennis Academy, Antalya, Turkey
18 October 2023
Clay

Singapore
1

			1	2	3
1	(Syria) (Singapore)	Yacoub Makzoume; Shaheed Alam	7^{7} 6^{3}	1; 6	5; 7
2	(Syria) (Singapore)	Hazem Naw; Ng Hao Yuan	6; 2	6; 2
3	(Syria) (Singapore)	Amer Naow / Hazem Naw; Roy Hobbs / Jerall Yasin	4; 6	6; 1	6; 2

==== Iraq vs. United Arab Emirates ====
Iraq
1
Megasaray Tennis Academy, Antalya, Turkey
18 October 2023
Clay

United Arab Emirates
2

			1	2	3
1	(Iraq) (United Arab Emirates)	Abdullah Ali Hatem Ghrairi; Omar Al-Awadhi	2; 6	6; 4	3; 6
2	(Iraq) (United Arab Emirates)	Adil Mustafa Al-Saedi; Hamad Abbas Janahi	7; 5	6; 1
3	(Iraq) (United Arab Emirates)	Mohammed Al-Shammari / Abdullah Ali Hatem Ghrairi; Abdulrahman Al Janahi / Omar Al-Awadhi	2; 6	4; 6

==== Syria vs. Iraq ====
Syria
3
Megasaray Tennis Academy, Antalya, Turkey
19 October 2023
Clay

Iraq
0

			1	2	3
1	(Syria) (Iraq)	Rabee Saleem; Mohammed Abuzed Saber	6; 0	6; 2
2	(Syria) (Iraq)	Hazem Naw; Adil Mustafa Al-Saedi	6; 3	6; 3
3	(Syria) (Iraq)	Amer Naow / Hazem Naw; Mohammed Al-Shammari / Abdullah Ali Hatem Ghrairi	4; 6	6; 1	7; 5

==== United Arab Emirates vs. Singapore ====
United Arab Emirates
0
Megasaray Tennis Academy, Antalya, Turkey
19 October 2023
Clay

Singapore
3

			1	2	3
1	(United Arab Emirates) (Singapore)	Abdulrahman Al Janahi; Shaheed Alam	2; 6	1; 6
2	(United Arab Emirates) (Singapore)	Omar Al-Awadhi; Roy Hobbs	2; 6	3; 6
3	(United Arab Emirates) (Singapore)	Abdulrahman Al Janahi / Hamad Abbas Janahi; Michael Dylan Jimenez / Jerall Yasin	5; 7	5; 7

==== Syria vs. United Arab Emirates ====
Syria
3
Megasaray Tennis Academy, Antalya, Turkey
20 October 2023
Clay

United Arab Emirates
0

			1	2	3
1	(Syria) (United Arab Emirates)	Rabee Saleem; Abdulrahman Al Janahi	6; 2	6; 3
2	(Syria) (United Arab Emirates)	Hazem Naw; Abdulla Al Marzouqi	6; 0	6; 1
3	(Syria) (United Arab Emirates)	Yacoub Makzoume / Amer Naow; Omar Al-Awadhi / Hamad Abbas Janahi	6; 3	6; 0

==== Iraq vs. Singapore ====
Iraq
0
Megasaray Tennis Academy, Antalya, Turkey
20 October 2023
Clay

Singapore
3

			1	2	3
1	(Iraq) (Singapore)	Mohammed Abuzed Saber; Shaheed Alam	1; 6	1; 6
2	(Iraq) (Singapore)	Abdullah Ali Hatem Ghrairi; Roy Hobbs	2; 6	6; 3	1; 6
3	(Iraq) (Singapore)	Mohammed Al-Shammari / Mohammed Abuzed Saber; Ng Hao Yuan / Jerall Yasin	2; 6	2; 6

=== Pool B ===
==== Kuwait vs. Guam ====
Kuwait
3
Megasaray Tennis Academy, Antalya, Turkey
18 October 2023
Clay

Guam
0

			1	2	3
1	(Kuwait) (Guam)	Bader Alabdullah; Daniel Llarenas	6; 1	6; 4
2	(Kuwait) (Guam)	Essa Qabazard; Camden Camacho	6; 3	6; 0
3	(Kuwait) (Guam)	Abdulhamid Mubarak / Essa Qabazard; Mason Caldwell / Derek Okuhama	6; 2	6; 1

==== Turkmenistan vs. Kyrgyzstan ====
Turkmenistan
0
Megasaray Tennis Academy, Antalya, Turkey
18 October 2023
Clay

Kyrgyzstan
3

			1	2	3
1	(Turkmenistan) (Kyrgyzstan)	Yuriy Rogusskiy; Mirgiiaz Mirdzhaliev	2; 6	4; 6
2	(Turkmenistan) (Kyrgyzstan)	Meylis Orazmuhamedow; Ilgiz Kamchibekov	4; 6	1; 6
3	(Turkmenistan) (Kyrgyzstan)	Atlymyrat Gurbanov / Yuriy Rogusskiy; Kirill Kistanov / Mirgiiaz Mirdzhaliev	3; 6	2; 6

==== Kuwait vs. Turkmenistan ====
Kuwait
3
Megasaray Tennis Academy, Antalya, Turkey
19 October 2023
Clay

Turkmenistan
0

			1	2	3
1	(Kuwait) (Turkmenistan)	Bader Alabdullah; Yuriy Rogusskiy	7^{12} 6^{10}	6; 0
2	(Kuwait) (Turkmenistan)	Essa Qabazard; Meylis Orazmuhamedow	6; 2	6; 4
3	(Kuwait) (Turkmenistan)	Abdulhamid Mubarak / Essa Qabazard; Atlymyrat Gurbanov / Yuriy Rogusskiy	6; 4	6; 1

==== Kyrgyzstan vs. Guam ====
Kyrgyzstan
3
Megasaray Tennis Academy, Antalya, Turkey
19 October 2023
Clay

Guam
0

			1	2	3
1	(Kyrgyzstan) (Guam)	Kirill Kistanov; Daniel Llarenas	7^{7} 6^{3}	3; 6	6; 2
2	(Kyrgyzstan) (Guam)	Ilgiz Kamchibekov; Camden Camacho	6; 1	6; 2
3	(Kyrgyzstan) (Guam)	Kirill Kistanov / Mirgiiaz Mirdzhaliev; Mason Caldwell / Derek Okuhama	7^{7} 6^{3}	7^{7} 6^{2}

==== Kuwait vs. Kyrgyzstan ====
Kuwait
0
Megasaray Tennis Academy, Antalya, Turkey
20 October 2023
Clay

Kyrgyzstan
3

			1	2	3
1	(Kuwait) (Kyrgyzstan)	Bader Alabdullah; Mirgiiaz Mirdzhaliev	4; 6	4; 6
2	(Kuwait) (Kyrgyzstan)	Essa Qabazard; Ilgiz Kamchibekov	6; 3	6^{4} 7^{7}	6^{5} 7^{7}
3	(Kuwait) (Kyrgyzstan)	Yaqoub Mohammed / Abdulhamid Mubarak; Kirill Kistanov / Mirgiiaz Mirdzhaliev	5; 7	6; 4	3; 6

==== Turkmenistan vs. Guam ====
Turkmenistan
1
Megasaray Tennis Academy, Antalya, Turkey
20 October 2023
Clay

Guam
2

			1	2	3
1	(Turkmenistan) (Guam)	Yuriy Rogusskiy; Daniel Llarenas	3; 6	2; 6
2	(Turkmenistan) (Guam)	Meylis Orazmuhamedow; Camden Camacho	2; 6	2; 6
3	(Turkmenistan) (Guam)	Hadzhymyrat Charyyev / Atlymyrat Gurbanov; Mason Caldwell / Derek Okuhama	6; 3	7^{8} 6^{6}

== Play-offs ==
=== Promotional play-offs ===
==== Syria vs. Kuwait ====
Syria
2
Megasaray Tennis Academy, Antalya, Turkey
21 October 2023
Clay

Kuwait
0

			1	2	3
1	(Syria) (Kuwait)	Yacoub Makzoume; Bader Alabdullah	6; 4	6^{1} 7^{7}	6; 0
2	(Syria) (Kuwait)	Hazem Naw; Essa Qabazard	6; 0	6; 2
3	(Syria) (Kuwait)	Amer Naow / Rabee Saleem; Bader Alabdullah / Essa Qabazard				not played

==== Kyrgyzstan vs. Singapore ====
Kyrgyzstan
0
Megasaray Tennis Academy, Antalya, Turkey
21 October 2023
Clay

Singapore
2

			1	2	3
1	(Kyrgyzstan) (Singapore)	Mirgiiaz Mirdzhaliev; Shaheed Alam	6^{4} 7^{7}	3; 6
2	(Kyrgyzstan) (Singapore)	Ilgiz Kamchibekov; Roy Hobbs	4; 6	2; 6
3	(Kyrgyzstan) (Singapore)	Kirill Kistanov / Mirgiiaz Mirdzhaliev; Shaheed Alam / Roy Hobbs				not played

=== Relegation play-offs ===
==== United Arab Emirates vs. Turkmenistan ====
United Arab Emirates
2
Megasaray Tennis Academy, Antalya, Turkey
21 October 2023
Clay

Turkmenistan
1

			1	2	3
1	(United Arab Emirates) (Turkmenistan)	Abdulrahman Al Janahi; Atlymyrat Gurbanov	6; 1	6; 0
2	(United Arab Emirates) (Turkmenistan)	Omar Al-Awadhi; Meylis Orazmuhamedow	6; 4	4; 6	6^{5} 7^{7}
3	(United Arab Emirates) (Turkmenistan)	Abdulrahman Al Janahi / Omar Al-Awadhi; Meylis Orazmuhamedow / Yuriy Rogusskiy	6; 1	2; 6	6; 4

==== Guam vs. Iraq ====
Guam
0
Megasaray Tennis Academy, Antalya, Turkey
21 October 2023
Clay

Iraq
2

			1	2	3
1	(Guam) (Iraq)	Daniel Llarenas; Abdullah Ali Hatem Ghrairi	2; 6	2; 6
2	(Guam) (Iraq)	Camden Camacho; Adil Mustafa Al-Saedi	2; 6	6; 4	6^{7} 7^{9}
3	(Guam) (Iraq)	Mason Caldwell / Derek Okuhama; Mohammed Al-Shammari / Abdullah Ali Hatem Ghrairi				not played

== Final placements ==
Placing	Teams	
Promoted/First	Singapore	Syria
Third	Kuwait	Kyrgyzstan
Fifth	Iraq	United Arab Emirates
Relegated/Seventh	Guam	Turkmenistan

- Singapore and Syria were promoted to 2024 Davis Cup Asia/Oceania Zone Group III.
- Guam and Turkmenistan were relegated to 2024 Davis Cup Asia/Oceania Zone Group V.
