= 2020 Davis Cup World Group II play-offs =

International tennis competition play-offs

The 2020 Davis Cup World Group II play-offs were held on 6–7 March. The twelve winning teams from the play-offs qualified for the 2020 Davis Cup World Group II and the twelve losing teams would play at the Group III of the corresponding continental zone.

== Teams ==
Twenty-four teams played for twelve spots in the World Group II, in series decided on a home and away basis.

These twenty-four teams are:

- 12 losing teams from their Group II zone:
- 12 teams from their Group III zone:
  - 4 from Europe
  - 3 from Asia/Oceania,
  - 3 from Americas, and
  - 2 from Africa.

The 12 winning teams from the play-offs would play at the World Group II and the 12 losing teams would play at the Group III of the corresponding continental zone.

Seeded teams

- Bulgaria
- Denmark
- Egypt
- El Salvador
- Georgia
- Guatemala
- Hong Kong
- Indonesia
- Morocco
- Paraguay
- Philippines
- Zimbabwe

Unseeded teams

- Costa Rica
- Estonia
- Greece
- Jamaica
- Kenya
- Latvia
- Poland
- Puerto Rico
- Sri Lanka
- Syria
- Tunisia
- Vietnam

== Results summary ==
Home team	Score	Away team	Location	Venue	Surface
Latvia	4–1	Egypt	Jūrmala	National Tennis Centre Lielupe	Hard (i)
Paraguay	4–0	Sri Lanka	Asunción	Club Internacional de Tenis	Clay
Morocco	4–0	Vietnam	Marrakesh	Royal Tennis Club de Marrakech	Clay
Indonesia	4–0	Kenya	Jakarta	Gelora Bung Karno Sports Complex	Hard
Guatemala	1–3	Tunisia	Guatemala City	Federación Nacional De Tenis	Hard
Costa Rica	1–4	Bulgaria	San José	Costa Rica Country Club	Hard
Poland	4–0	Hong Kong	Kalisz	Arena Kalisz	Hard (i)
Zimbabwe	3–1	Syria	Harare	Harare Sports Club	Hard
Philippines	1–4	Greece	Manila	Philippine Columbian Association	Clay (i)
Denmark	5–0	Puerto Rico	Holbæk	Holbæk Sportsby	Hard (i)
El Salvador	3–1	Jamaica	San Salvador	Polideportivo de Ciudad Merliot	Hard
Georgia	1–4	Estonia	Tbilisi	Alex Metreveli Tennis Club	Hard

== World Group II play-offs results ==
=== Latvia vs. Egypt ===
Latvia
4
National Tennis Centre Lielupe, Jūrmala, Latvia
6–7 March 2020
Hard (i)

Egypt
1

			1	2	3
1	(Latvia) (Egypt)	Kārlis Ozoliņš; Mohamed Safwat	6^{9} 7^{11}	5; 7
2	(Latvia) (Egypt)	Ernests Gulbis; Karim-Mohamed Maamoun	6; 4	6; 3
3	(Latvia) (Egypt)	Ernests Gulbis / Kārlis Ozoliņš; Karim-Mohamed Maamoun / Mohamed Safwat	6; 3	6; 4
4	(Latvia) (Egypt)	Ernests Gulbis; Mohamed Safwat	6; 2	6; 4
5	(Latvia) (Egypt)	Robert Strombachs; Amr Elsayed Abdou Ahmed Mohamed	6; 3	7^{7} 6^{3}

=== Paraguay vs. Sri Lanka ===
Paraguay
4
Club Internacional de Tenis, Asunción, Paraguay
6–7 March 2020
Clay

Sri Lanka
0

			1	2	3
1	(Paraguay) (Sri Lanka)	Adolfo Daniel Vallejo; Sharmal Dissanayake	6; 4	6; 4
2	(Paraguay) (Sri Lanka)	Martín Antonio Vergara del Puerto; Yasitha de Silva	7; 5	6; 3
3	(Paraguay) (Sri Lanka)	Juan Borba / Ayed Zatar; Yasitha de Silva / Sharmal Dissanayake	6; 1	6; 4
4	(Paraguay) (Sri Lanka)	Adolfo Daniel Vallejo; Thehan Sanjaya Wijemanne	6; 1	6; 1
5	(Paraguay) (Sri Lanka)	Martín Antonio Vergara del Puerto; Sharmal Dissanayake				not played

=== Morocco vs. Vietnam ===
Morocco
4
Royal Tennis Club de Marrakech, Marrakesh, Morocco
6–7 March 2020
Clay

Vietnam
0

			1	2	3
1	(Morocco) (Vietnam)	Lamine Ouahab; Lý Hoàng Nam	6; 3	6; 2
2	(Morocco) (Vietnam)	Adam Moundir; Nguyễn Văn Phương	6; 1	6; 4
3	(Morocco) (Vietnam)	Anas Fattar / Lamine Ouahab; Lê Quốc Khánh / Lý Hoàng Nam	6; 4	6; 1
4	(Morocco) (Vietnam)	Aïssa Benchakroun; Trịnh Linh Giang	2; 6	6; 3	10; 4
5	(Morocco) (Vietnam)	Lamine Ouahab; Nguyễn Văn Phương				not played

=== Indonesia vs. Kenya ===
Indonesia
4
Gelora Bung Karno Sports Complex, Jakarta, Indonesia
6–7 March 2020
Hard

Kenya
0

			1	2	3
1	(Indonesia) (Kenya)	Christopher Rungkat; Sheil Kotecha	6; 1	6; 2
2	(Indonesia) (Kenya)	David Agung Susanto; Ismael Changawa Ruwa Mzai	6; 2	6; 4
3	(Indonesia) (Kenya)	Christopher Rungkat / David Agung Susanto; Ismael Changawa Ruwa Mzai / Ibrahim Kibet Yego	6^{2} 7^{7}	7^{8} 6^{6}	7^{7} 6^{3}
4	(Indonesia) (Kenya)	Gunawan Trismuwantara; Kevin Cheruiyot	6; 4	6; 2
5	(Indonesia) (Kenya)	Christopher Rungkat; Ismael Changawa Ruwa Mzai				not played

=== Guatemala vs. Tunisia ===
Guatemala
1
Federación Nacional De Tenis, Guatemala City, Guatemala
6–7 March 2020
Hard

Tunisia
3

			1	2	3
1	(Guatemala) (Tunisia)	Wilfredo González; Aziz Dougaz	6; 3	3; 6	7; 5
2	(Guatemala) (Tunisia)	Franz Luna Lavidalie; Malek Jaziri	2; 6	3; 6
3	(Guatemala) (Tunisia)	Sebastián Domínguez / Wilfredo González; Moez Echargui / Malek Jaziri	6^{4} 7^{7}	5; 7
4	(Guatemala) (Tunisia)	Wilfredo González; Malek Jaziri	2; 6	4; 6
5	(Guatemala) (Tunisia)	Franz Luna Lavidalie; Aziz Dougaz				not played

=== Costa Rica vs. Bulgaria ===
Costa Rica
1
Costa Rica Country Club, San José, Costa Rica
6–7 March 2020
Hard

Bulgaria
4

			1	2	3
1	(Costa Rica) (Bulgaria)	Julián Saborío; Dimitar Kuzmanov	4; 6	2; 6
2	(Costa Rica) (Bulgaria)	Jesse Flores; Alexandar Lazarov	5; 7	6; 4	3; 6
3	(Costa Rica) (Bulgaria)	Jesse Flores / Pablo Núñez; Adrian Andreev / Alexandar Lazarov	7^{11} 6^{9}	4; 6	7^{12} 6^{10}
4	(Costa Rica) (Bulgaria)	Jesse Flores; Dimitar Kuzmanov	4; 6	3; 6
5	(Costa Rica) (Bulgaria)	Rodrigo Crespo Piedra; Alexander Donski	2; 6	4; 6

=== Poland vs. Hong Kong ===
Poland
4
Arena Kalisz, Kalisz, Poland
6–7 March 2020
Hard (i)

Hong Kong
0

			1	2	3
1	(Poland) (Hong Kong)	Kacper Żuk; Lam Ching	6; 2	6; 1
2	(Poland) (Hong Kong)	Jerzy Janowicz; Yeung Pak-long	6^{5} 7^{7}	7; 5	6; 4
3	(Poland) (Hong Kong)	Szymon Walków / Jan Zieliński; Lam Ching / Yeung Pak-long	6; 3	6^{6} 7^{8}	6; 3
4	(Poland) (Hong Kong)	Maks Kaśnikowski; Kai Wai-yu	1; 6	6; 2	10; 3
5	(Poland) (Hong Kong)	Jerzy Janowicz; Lam Ching				not played

=== Zimbabwe vs. Syria ===
Zimbabwe
3
Harare Sports Club, Harare, Zimbabwe
6–7 March 2020
Hard

Syria
1

			1	2	3
1	(Zimbabwe) (Syria)	Mehluli Don Ayanda Sibanda; Hazem Naw	3; 6	3; 6
2	(Zimbabwe) (Syria)	Benjamin Lock; Amer Naow	6; 3	6; 3
3	(Zimbabwe) (Syria)	Benjamin Lock / Courtney John Lock; Yacoub Makzoume / Hazem Naw	6; 1	4; 6	6; 3
4	(Zimbabwe) (Syria)	Benjamin Lock; Hazem Naw	6; 4	6; 4
5	(Zimbabwe) (Syria)	Mehluli Don Ayanda Sibanda; Yacoub Makzoume				not played

=== Philippines vs. Greece ===
Philippines
1
Philippine Columbian Association, Manila, Philippines
6–7 March 2020
Clay (i)

Greece
4

			1	2	3
1	(Philippines) (Greece)	Alberto Lim Jr. Stefanos Tsitsipas	2; 6	1; 6
2	(Philippines) (Greece)	Jeson Patrombon; Petros Tsitsipas	2; 6	1; 6
3	(Philippines) (Greece)	Francis Alcantara / Ruben Gonzales; Markos Kalovelonis / Petros Tsitsipas	7^{7} 6^{5}	6; 4
4	(Philippines) (Greece)	Jeson Patrombon; Stefanos Tsitsipas	2; 6	1; 6
5	(Philippines) (Greece)	Eric Olivarez Jr. Petros Tsitsipas	4; 6	5; 7

=== Denmark vs. Puerto Rico ===
Denmark
5
Holbæk Sportsby, Holbæk, Denmark
6–7 March 2020
Hard (i)

Puerto Rico
0

			1	2	3
1	(Denmark) (Puerto Rico)	Mikael Torpegaard; Quinton Vega	7^{7} 6^{5}	6; 0
2	(Denmark) (Puerto Rico)	Holger Rune; Ignacio García	4; 6	6; 3	6; 0
3	(Denmark) (Puerto Rico)	Søren Hess-Olesen / Frederik Nielsen; Ignacio García / Quinton Vega	6; 1	6; 2
4	(Denmark) (Puerto Rico)	Frederik Nielsen; Ignacio García	7^{7} 6^{5}	6; 2
5	(Denmark) (Puerto Rico)	Holger Rune; Quinton Vega	6; 1	7^{7} 6^{4}

=== El Salvador vs. Jamaica ===
El Salvador
3
Polideportivo de Ciudad Merliot, San Salvador, El Salvador
6–7 March 2020
Hard

Jamaica
1

			1	2	3
1	(El Salvador) (Jamaica)	Alberto Emmanuel Alvarado Larín; Blaise Bicknell	3; 6	2; 6
2	(El Salvador) (Jamaica)	Marcelo Arévalo; Rowland Phillips	6; 3	6^{4} 7^{7}	6; 2
3	(El Salvador) (Jamaica)	Marcelo Arévalo / Lluis Miralles; Blaise Bicknell / Rowland Phillips	6; 3	6; 2
4	(El Salvador) (Jamaica)	Marcelo Arévalo; Blaise Bicknell	6; 4	7^{7} 6^{5}
5	(El Salvador) (Jamaica)	Alberto Emmanuel Alvarado Larín; Rowland Phillips				not played

=== Georgia vs. Estonia ===
Georgia
1
Alex Metreveli Tennis Club, Tbilisi, Georgia
6–7 March 2020
Hard

Estonia
4

			1	2	3
1	(Georgia (country)) (Estonia)	Nikoloz Basilashvili; Vladimir Ivanov	6; 4	6; 1
2	(Georgia (country)) (Estonia)	Aleksandre Metreveli; Kristjan Tamm	4; 6	6; 4	3; 6
3	(Georgia (country)) (Estonia)	Aleksandre Metreveli / George Tsivadze; Vladimir Ivanov / Mattias Siimar	6; 3	3; 6	3; 6
4	(Georgia (country)) (Estonia)	Zura Tkemaladze; Kristjan Tamm	3; 6	6; 2	5; 7
5	(Georgia (country)) (Estonia)	Nikoloz Davlianidze; Daniil Glinka	0; 6	7; 5	3; 10
