= List of Men's Tennis Academic All-America Team Members of the Year =

Student athlete award

Men's Tennis Academic All-America Team Members of the Year
- Awarded for: The yearly outstanding men's tennis Academic All-America team member
- Country: United States and Canada
- Presented by: College Sports Communicators

History
- Most recent: Dylan Dietrich, University of Virginia; Adam Lynch, Barry University; Advik Mareedu, Claremont-Mudd-Scripps; Shaheed Alam, Keiser University
- Next ceremony: June 2027
- Website: official site

The Men's Tennis Academic All-America Team Member of the Year is the annual most outstanding singular college tennis athlete of the set of male tennis athletes selected for the Academic All-America Teams in a given year.

== Four-division era (2023–present) ==
Men's Tennis Academic All-America Team Members of the Year

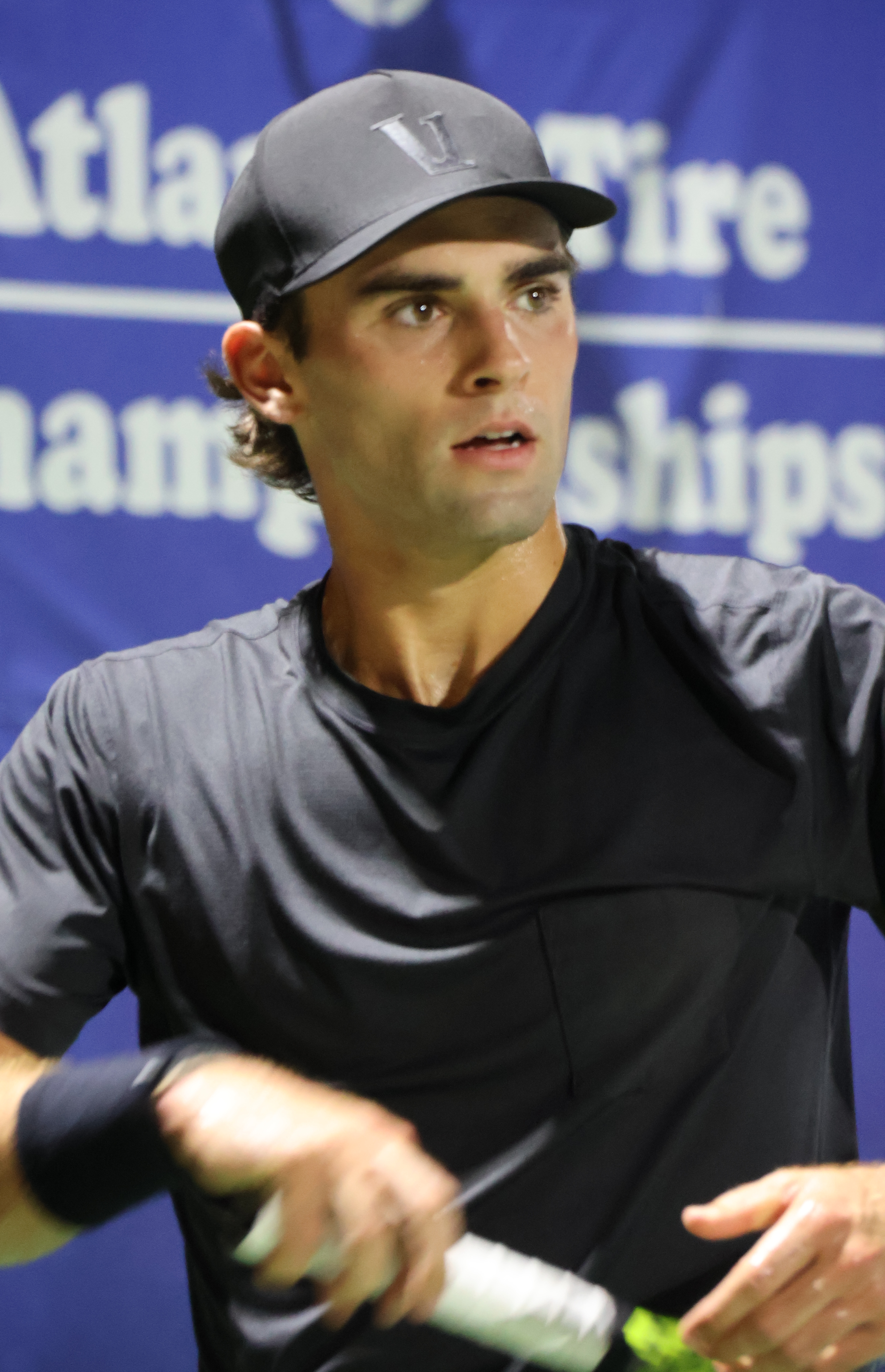
Eliot Spizzirri (pictured in 2023), 2024 winner

Key
†	Indicates winners of the all-sports Academic All-America award.

All winners are American unless indicated otherwise.

Men's Tennis Academic All-America Team Members of the Year (2023–present)
Year	Division I		Division II		Division III		College/NAIA (Note: College Division, 2011–19; NAIA, 2018–present)	
Year	Winner	School	Winner	School	Winner	School	Winner	School
2023	(Canada) Sebastien Collard	South Alabama	(Germany) Cedric Drenth	Wayne State	Nick Aney	Gustavus Adolphus	(Austria) Martin Muller	Cumberlands
2024	Eliot Spizzirri	Texas	(Serbia) Marko Jovanovic	Adelphi	Kailas Kahler	MIT	(Germany) Charly Zick	Georgia Gwinnett
2025	(Belgium) Pierre-Yves Bailly	Texas	(Germany) Cedric Drenth	Wayne State	Advik Mereedu	Claremont-Mudd-Scripps	(Singapore) Shaheed Alam	Keiser
2026	(Switzerland) Dylan Dietrich	Virginia	Adam Lynch	Barry	Advik Mereedu	Claremont-Mudd-Scripps	(Singapore) Shaheed Alam	Keiser
