= Yacoub Makzoume =

Syrian tennis player

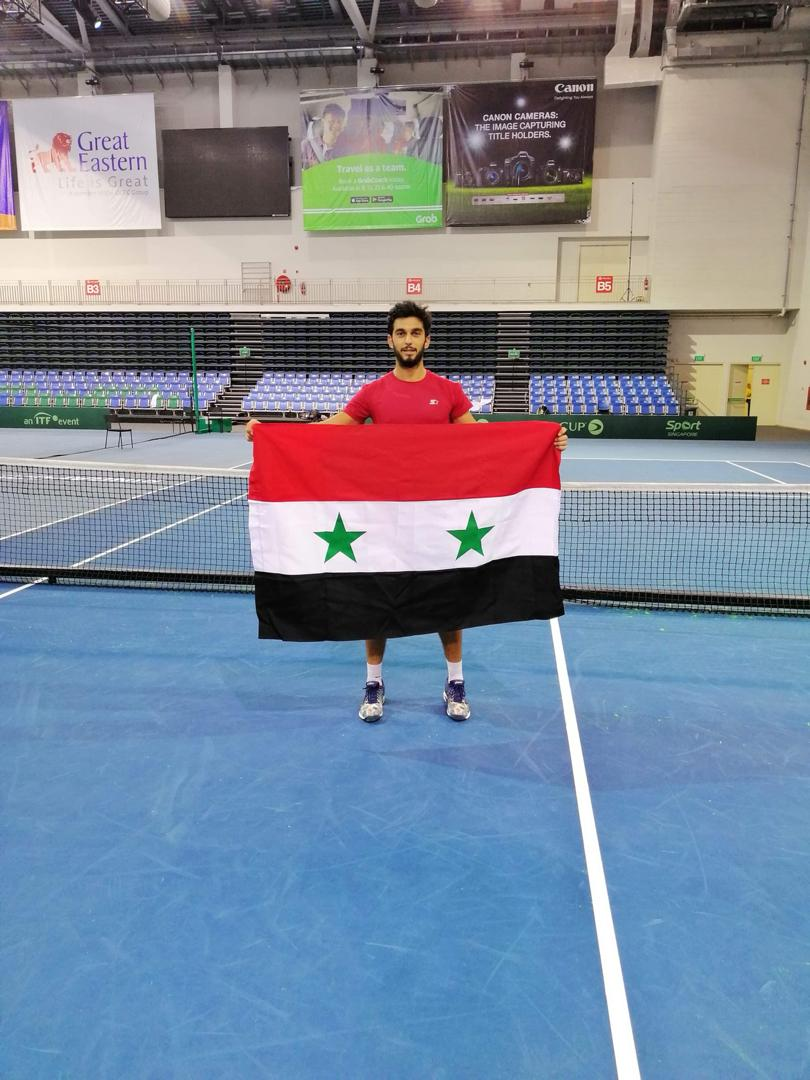
- Yacoub Makozume Singapore Daviscup
- Full name: Yacoub Raouf Makzoume
- Country (sports): Syria
- Residence: Lattakia, Syria
- Born: March 4, 1995 (age 30) Lattakia, Syria
- Height: 1.92 m (6 ft 4 in)
- Plays: Right-handed (two-handed backhand)
- College: Tishreen University

Singles
- Highest ranking: No. 1572 (06 May 2019)

Doubles
- Highest ranking: No. 1695 (30 Sep 2019)

Team competitions
- Davis Cup: Singles 6–6; Doubles 5–3
- Last updated on: 25 February 2020.

Yacoub Makzoume (born 4 March 1995) is a Syrian tennis player. He is a member of the Syria Davis Cup team.

Makzoume has represented Syria at the Davis Cup, where he has a win-loss record of 11–9.

== Career ==
Yacoub turned professional in 2011.

He reached a career-high junior ranking of No. 620 on 2 January 2012.

== Davis Cup ==
=== Participation: (11–9) ===
Yacoub's First Participation with Syria Davis Cup team was in when he participated 3 times in a row in 2017, 2018 and 2019 in group 3 and qualified with them to group 2.

| Group membership World Group (0–0) WG play-off (0–0) Group I (0–0) Group II (0–0) Group III (11–9) Group IV (0–0) | Matches by surface Clay (3–3) Hard (8–6) Grass (0–0) Carpet (0–0) | Matches by type Singles (6–6) Doubles (5–3) |

- ▲ ▼ indicates the outcome of the Davis Cup match followed by the score, date, place of event, the zonal classification and its phase, and the court surface.

| Rubber outcome | No. | Rubber | Match type (partner if any) | Opponent nation | Opponent player(s) | Score |
▼1–2; 17 July 2017; Sri Lanka Tennis Association, Colombo, Sri Lanka; Asia/Oceania Zone Group III first round; clay surface
| Defeat | 1 | I | Singles | Pacific Oceania | Heve Kelley | 3–6, 6–1, 2–6 |
| Victory | 2 | III | Doubles (with Salim Majdi) | Pacific Oceania | Brett Baudinet / Aymeric Mara | 6–3, 1–6, 6–3 |
▼1–2; 20 July 2017; Sri Lanka Tennis Association, Colombo, Sri Lanka; Asia/Oceania Zone Group III first round; clay surface
| Victory | 3 | I | Singles | Jordan | Seif Adas | 6–1, 6–1 |
| Defeat | 4 | III | Doubles (with Kareem Al Allaf) | Jordan | Hamzeh Alaswad / Mousa Alkotop | 4–6, 3–6 |
▼1–2; 20 July 2017; Sri Lanka Tennis Association, Colombo, Sri Lanka; Asia/Oceania Zone Group III first round; clay surface
| Defeat | 5 | I | Singles | Sri Lanka | Harshana Godamanna | 1–6, 3–6 |
▲2–0; 22 July 2017; Sri Lanka Tennis Association, Colombo, Sri Lanka; Asia/Oceania Zone Group III Semi Final; clay surface
| Victory | 6 | I | Singles | (United Arab Emirates) UAE | Omar Alawadhi | 4–6, 6–2, 6–3 |
▼0–3; 02 April 2018; My Dinh Sports Complex, Hanoi, Vietnam; Asia/Oceania Zone Group III first round; hard surface
| Defeat | 7 | II | Singles | Qatar | Mubarak Shannan Zayid | 2–6, 6–2,3–6 |
| Defeat | 8 | III | Doubles (with Rabee Sleem) | Qatar | Issa Shanan Al Harrasi / Mousa Shanan Zayed | 4–6, 6–7 |
▲2–1; 04 April 2018; My Dinh Sports Complex, Hanoi, Vietnam; Asia/Oceania Zone Group III first round; hard surface
| Defeat | 9 | II | Singles | Saudi Arabia | Ammar Alhagbani | 5–7, 6–2, 3–6 |
| Victory | 10 | III | Doubles (with Rabee Sleem) | Saudi Arabia | Ammar Alhagbani / Fahad Al Saad | 6–4, 3–6, 6–2 |
▼1–2; 05 April 2018; My Dinh Sports Complex, Hanoi, Vietnam; Asia/Oceania Zone Group III first round; hard surface
| Victory | 11 | II | Singles | Kuwait | Abduallah Maqdes | 7–5, 6–4 |
| Defeat | 12 | III | Doubles (with Rabee Sleem) | Kuwait | Abduallah Maqdes / Mohammad Ghareeb | 3–6, 1–6 |
▲2–1; 06 April 2018; My Dinh Sports Complex, Hanoi, Vietnam; Asia/Oceania Zone Group III first round; hard surface
| Victory | 13 | II | Singles | Jordan | Seif Adas | 6–3, 6–3 |
| Victory | 14 | III | Doubles (with Rabee Sleem) | Jordan | Hamzeh Alaswad / Mousa Alkotop | 6–4, 3–6, 6–4 |
▲3–0; 26 June 2019; OCBC Arena, Singapore, Singapore; Asia/Oceania Zone Group III first round; hard surface
| Victory | 15 | I | Singles | Iran | Mahdi Souri | 7–6, 6–2 |
| Victory | 16 | III | Doubles (with Kareem Al Allaf) | Iran | Hesam Esmail Yazdi / Kiarash Souri | 6–3, 6–1 |
▲3–0; 27 June 2019; OCBC Arena, Singapore, Singapore; Asia/Oceania Zone Group III first round; hard surface
| Victory | 17 | I | Singles | Qatar | Mousa Shanan Zayed | 1–6, 6–3, 6–2 |
▲2–1; 28 June 2019; OCBC Arena, Singapore, Singapore; Asia/Oceania Zone Group III first round; hard surface
| Defeat | 18 | I | Singles | Malaysia | Christian Didier Chin | 3–6, 6–1, 4–6 |
| Victory | 19 | III | Doubles (with Kareem Al Allaf) | Malaysia | Christian Didier Chin / Shamirul Shahril Mohd Adam Das | 6–2, 7–5 |
▼0–2; 29 June 2019; OCBC Arena, Singapore, Singapore; Asia/Oceania Zone Group III play-off round; hard surface
| Defeat | 20 | I | Singles | Vietnam | Trịnh Linh Giang | 6–7, 6–7 |
