= Syria Davis Cup team =

National tennis team

Syria
- ITF ranking: T-75 ▲1
- Colors: Green, white (red stars) and black
- First year: 1986
- Years played: 35
- Ties played (W–L): 135 (63 - 72)
- Years in World Group: 0
- Most total wins: Rabi Bouhassoun (34 - 21)
- Most singles wins: Rabi Bouhassoun (29 - 8)
- Most doubles wins: Lays Salim (11 - 18)
- Best doubles team: Hayan Maarouf & Majdi Salim (5 - 4)
- Most ties played: Lays Salim (43)
- Most years played: Lays Salim (11)

The Syria Davis Cup team represents Syria in Davis Cup tennis competition and are governed by the Syrian Arab Tennis Federation. Syria currently competes in the Asia/Oceania Zone of Group III.

== History ==
Syria made their Davis Cup debut in 1986. Their best performance has been reaching the Asia/Oceania Zone Group II second round in 1988.

Syria currently compete in the Asia/Oceania Zone of Group IV. They won Group III in 2000, 2010, and 2013.

Kareem Al Allaf represented the Syria Davis Cup team at the Davis Cup, where he played #1 singles and had a W/L record of 18–9 (12–5 in singles play) in 2015–21.

The Syrian Tennis Federation banned him, because he competed in a match against an Israeli opponent in a 2022 ITF Men's World Tennis Tour tournament in Fayetteville, Arkansas, in November 2022. Egyptian journalist Reem Abulleil wrote on Twitter: "Syrian tennis player @KareemAllaf played against and defeated Israeli player Nitzan Ricklis last week in a $15k in Fayetteville, Arkansas. As a response, the Syrian Tennis Federation has banned him. Hope @ITFTennis do something. This nonsense has got to stop."

As a result of the Syrian federation's ban, Allaf switched nationalities to represent his birth country, the United States.

== Current team (2024) ==
- Hazem Naw
- Yacoub Makzoume
- Taym Al Azmeh
- Rabee Saleem

== Statistics ==
The youngest player in Syrian Davis Cup history was Rabi Bouhassoun, aged 15 years and 212 days. The oldest player in Syrian Davis Cup history was Jehad Sheet, aged 41 years and 159 days.

The longest rubber in Syrian Davis Cup history was 4 hours and 22 minutes, when on 9 February 2001 Selvam Veerasingam of Malaysia defeated Syria's Rabi Bouhassoun 7-6 6-7 7-6 7-6 The longest final set of a rubber, in Syrian Davis Cup history, took place on 9 April 1988 when Hassan Bin Bohari and Albert Teo of Singapore defeated Abdul-Latif Mourad and Samer Mourad of Syria 16-14 in the third and final set of the 6-4 6-3 16-14 match.

=== 2010s ===
Year	Competition	Date	Location	Opponent	Score	Result
2010	Asia/Oceania Group III, Group stage	28 Apr	Tehran (IRN)	Iran	2–1	Win
2010	Asia/Oceania Group III, Group stage	29 Apr	Tehran (IRN)	Kuwait	3–0	Win
2010	Asia/Oceania Group III, Promotional Play-off	1 May	Tehran (IRN)	Vietnam	1–2	Loss
2010	Asia/Oceania Group III, Promotional Play-off	2 May	Tehran (IRN)	Lebanon	2–1	Win
2011	Asia/Oceania Group II, First round	4–6 Mar	Changwon (KOR)	South Korea	1–4	Loss
2011	Asia/Oceania Group II, Play-offs	8–10 Jul	Hong Kong	Hong Kong	1–4	Loss
2012	Asia/Oceania Group III, Group stage	25 Apr	Tehran (IRN)	Bangladesh	3–0	Win
2012	Asia/Oceania Group III, Group stage	26 Apr	Tehran (IRN)	Malaysia	3–0	Win
2012	Asia/Oceania Group III, Group stage	27 Apr	Tehran (IRN)	Oman	3–0	Win
2012	Asia/Oceania Group III, Promotional Play-off	28 Apr	Tehran (IRN)	Iran	2–1	Win
2012	Asia/Oceania Group III, Promotional Play-off	29 Apr	Tehran (IRN)	Kuwait	3–0	Win
2013	Asia/Oceania Group II, First round	1–3 Feb	Lapu-Lapu (PHI)	Philippines	2–3	Loss
2013	Asia/Oceania Group II, Play-offs	5–7 Apr	Mishref (KUW)	Kuwait	2–3	Loss
2014	Asia/Oceania Group III, Group Stage	11 Jun	Tehran (IRN)	Cambodia	2–1	Win
2014	Asia/Oceania Group III, Group Stage	12 Jun	Tehran (IRN)	Malaysia	1–2	Loss
2014	Asia/Oceania Group III, Group Stage	13 Jun	Tehran (IRN)	Turkmenistan	2–1	Win
2014	Asia/Oceania Group III, Play-offs	14 Jun	Tehran (IRN)	Iran	0–3	Loss
2015	Asia/Oceania Group III, Group Stage	25 Mar	Kuala Lumpur (MAS)	Cambodia	2–1	Win
2015	Asia/Oceania Group III, Group Stage	26 Mar	Kuala Lumpur (MAS)	Vietnam	1–2	Loss
2015	Asia/Oceania Group III, Group Stage	27 Mar	Kuala Lumpur (MAS)	Turkmenistan	1–2	Loss
2015	Asia/Oceania Group III, Play-offs	28 Mar	Kuala Lumpur (MAS)	Saudi Arabia	3–0	Win
2016	Asia/Oceania Group III, Group Stage	12 Jul	Tehran (IRN)	Singapore	3–0	Win
2016	Asia/Oceania Group III, Group Stage	13 Jul	Tehran (IRN)	Qatar	2–1	Win
2016	Asia/Oceania Group III, Group Stage	14 Jul	Tehran (IRN)	Turkmenistan	2–1	Win
2016	Asia/Oceania Group III, Group Stage	15 Jul	Tehran (IRN)	Lebanon	0–3	Loss
2016	Asia/Oceania Group III, Play-offs	16 Jul	Tehran (IRN)	Iran	1–2	Loss
2017	Asia/Oceania Group III, Group Stage	17 Jul	Colombo (SRI)	Pacific Oceania	1–2	Loss
2017	Asia/Oceania Group III, Group Stage	19–20 Jul	Colombo (SRI)	Jordan	1–2	Loss
2017	Asia/Oceania Group III, Group Stage	20 Jul	Colombo (SRI)	Sri Lanka	1–2	Loss
2017	Asia/Oceania Group III, Play-offs	22 Jul	Colombo (SRI)	United Arab Emirates	2–0	Win
2018	Asia/Oceania Group III, Group Stage	2 Apr	Hanoi (VIE)	Qatar	0–3	Loss
2018	Asia/Oceania Group III, Group Stage	4 Apr	Hanoi (VIE)	Saudi Arabia	2–1	Win
2018	Asia/Oceania Group III, Group Stage	5 Apr	Hanoi (VIE)	Kuwait	1–2	Loss
2018	Asia/Oceania Group III, Group Stage	6 Apr	Hanoi (VIE)	Jordan	2–1	Win
2019	Asia/Oceania Group III, Group Stage	26 Jun	Singapore (SIN)	Iran	3–0	Win
2019	Asia/Oceania Group III, Group Stage	27 Jun	Singapore (SIN)	Qatar	3–0	Win
2019	Asia/Oceania Group III, Group Stage	28 Jun	Singapore (SIN)	Malaysia	2–1	Win
2019	Asia/Oceania Group III, Play-offs	29 Jul	Singapore (SIN)	Vietnam	0–2	Loss

=== 2020s ===
Year	Competition	Date	Location	Opponent	Score	Result
2020	World Group II Play-offs	6–7 Mar	Harare (ZIM)	Zimbabwe	1–3	Loss
2021	Asia/Oceania Group III, Group stage	15 Sep	Amman (JOR)	Jordan	3–0	Win
2021	Asia/Oceania Group III, Group stage	16 Sep	Amman (JOR)	Sri Lanka	3–0	Win
2021	Asia/Oceania Group III, Promotional Play-off	18 Sep	Amman (JOR)	Pacific Oceania	1–2	Loss

== See also ==
- Davis Cup
- Syria Billie Jean King Cup team
