= Ali Yazdani (tennis) =

Iranian tennis player

- Country (sports): Iran
- Born: 9 September 2003 (age 23) Jajarm, Iran
- Plays: Right-handed
- Prize money: US $23,141

Singles
- Career record: 0–0
- Career titles: 0
- Highest ranking: No. 684 (8 September 2025)
- Current ranking: No. 954 (14 September 2026)

Doubles
- Career record: 0–1
- Career titles: 0
- Highest ranking: No. 821 (22 June 2026)
- Current ranking: No. 1,018 (14 September 2026)
- Last updated on: 16 September 2026.

Ali Yazdani (Persian: علی یزدانی, born 9 September 2003 in Jajarm) is an Iranian professional tennis player. He has a career-high ATP singles ranking of world No. 684 achieved on 8 September 2025 and a doubles ranking of No. 821 achieved on 22 June 2026. He is currently the No. 1 player from Iran.

Yazdani plays for the Iranian National Team since 2021.

== ITF World Tennis Tour finals ==
=== Singles: 2 (1 title, 2 runner-ups) ===
Legend ITF WTT (1–2)

Result	W–L	Date	Tournament	Tier	Surface	Opponent	Score
Win	1–0	May 2025	M15 Tehran, Iran	WTT	Clay	(India) Karan Singh	6–4, 6–3
Loss	1–1	Jun 2025	M15 Kayseri, Turkey	WTT	Hard	(United States) Maxwell McKennon	5–7, 1–6
Loss	1–2	Aug 2025	M15 Pirot, Serbia	WTT	Clay	(Argentina) Juan Estévez	3–6, 6–7^{(1–7)}

=== Doubles: 1 (title) ===
Legend ITF WTT (1–0)

Result	W–L	Date	Tournament	Tier	Surface	Partner	Opponents	Score
Win	1–0	Jan 2024	M15 Kish Island, Iran	WTT	Clay	(Iran) Samyar Elyasi	(Italy) Simone Agostini (Italy) Gianluca Cadenasso	7–6^{(8–6)}, 6–4
