= Nguyễn Văn Phương =

Vietnamese tennis player

- Country (sports): Vietnam
- Residence: Bình Dương, Vietnam
- Born: 27 February 2001 (age 24) Bắc Giang, Vietnam
- Height: 1.75 m (5 ft 9 in)
- Plays: Right-handed (two-handed backhand)
- Prize money: $3,659

Singles
- Career record: 0–1 (at ATP Tour level, Grand Slam level, and in Davis Cup)
- Career titles: 0
- Highest ranking: No. 1332 (21 May 2018)

Grand Slam singles results
- Australian Open Junior: 2R (2019)
- French Open Junior: Q1 (2019)
- Wimbledon Junior: 1R (2019)

Doubles
- Career record: 0–0 (at ATP Tour level, Grand Slam level, and in Davis Cup)
- Career titles: 0
- Highest ranking: No. 1098 (17 December 2018)
- Current ranking: No. 1689 (2 March 2020)

Grand Slam doubles results
- Australian Open Junior: 2R (2019)
- Wimbledon Junior: 1R (2019)
Medal record
Men's Tennis
Representing Vietnam
Southeast Asian Games
Bronze medal – third place	2019 Philippines	Doubles
Bronze medal – third place	2021 Vietnam	Doubles
- Last updated on: 16 March 2020.

Nguyễn Văn Phương (born 27 February 2001) is a Vietnamese tennis player.

Nguyễn has a career high ATP singles ranking of 1332 achieved on 21 May 2018. He also has a career high ATP doubles ranking of 1098 achieved on 17 December 2018.

Nguyễn has a career-high ITF juniors ranking of 44, achieved on 31 December 2018.

Nguyễn represents Vietnam at the Davis Cup, where he has a W/L record of 0–1.

== Future and Challenger finals ==
=== Doubles: 1 (1–0) ===
Legend (singles) ATP Challenger Tour (0–0) ITF World Tennis Tour (1–0)	Titles by surface Hard (1–0) Clay (0–0) Grass (0–0) Carpet (0–0)

Result	W–L	Date	Tournament	Tier	Surface	Partner	Opponents	Score
Win	1–0	May 2018	Thừa Thiên-Huế, Vietnam F2	Futures	Hard	(Vietnam) Lý Hoàng Nam	(Hong Kong) Wong Chun-hun (Hong Kong) Yeung Pak-long	3–6, 6–3, [10–8]

== Davis Cup ==
=== Participations: (0–1) ===
Group membership World Group (0–0) WG Play-off (0–0) Group I (0–0) Group II (0–1) Group III (0–0) Group IV (0–0)	Matches by surface Hard (0–0) Clay (0–1) Grass (0–0) Carpet (0–0)	Matches by type Singles (0–1) Doubles (0–0)

- ▲ ▼ indicates the outcome of the Davis Cup match followed by the score, date, place of event, the zonal classification and its phase, and the court surface.

Rubber outcome	No.	Rubber	Match type (partner if any)	Opponent nation	Opponent player(s)	Score
▼0–4; 6-7 March 2020; Royal Tennis Club de Marrakech, Marrakesh, Morocco; World Group II Play-off First round; Clay surface
Defeat	1	II	Singles	Morocco	Adam Moundir	1–6, 4–6
