= Phạm Minh Tuấn =

Vietnamese tennis player

- Country (sports): Vietnam
- Born: 19 October 1993 (age 32) Đà Nẵng, Vietnam
- Plays: Right-handed
- Prize money: $808

Singles
- Career record: 1–4 (at ATP Tour level, Grand Slam level, and in Davis Cup)
- Career titles: 0

Doubles
- Career record: 2–2 (at ATP Tour level, Grand Slam level, and in Davis Cup)
- Career titles: 0
Medal record
Men's Tennis
Representing Vietnam
Southeast Asian Games
Bronze medal – third place	2021 Vietnam	Doubles
- Last updated on: 16 October 2017.

Phạm Minh Tuấn (born 19 October 1993) is a Vietnamese tennis player.

Phạm represents Vietnam at the Davis Cup where he has a W/L record of 3–6.
