= Amer Naow =

Syrian tennis player

- Country (sports): Syria
- Born: 1 January 1995 (age 31) Aleppo, Syria
- Plays: Right-handed (two-handed backhand)
- Prize money: $326

Singles
- Career record: 3–4 (at ATP Tour level, Grand Slam level, and in Davis Cup)
- Career titles: 0

Doubles
- Career record: 10–5 (at ATP Tour level, Grand Slam level, and in Davis Cup)
- Career titles: 0
- Last updated on: 30 December 2024.

Amer Naow (born 1 January 1995) is a Syrian former tennis player.

Naow represents Syria at the Davis Cup, where he has a W/L record of 13–9.

== Personal life ==
Naow is the older brother of fellow tennis player Hazem Naw.

Due to the Syrian Civil War, Naow was forced out of Aleppo and moved to Beirut, Lebanon, but now plays tennis for local leagues in Germany. Through this, he received a wildcard to the qualifying rounds of the 2017 Marburg Open, a Challenger-level tournament.
