= Saud Alhogbani =

Saudi tennis player

- Country (sports): Saudi Arabia
- Born: 15 January 2003 (age 22)
- Prize money: $156

Singles
- Career record: 6–7 (at ATP Tour level, Grand Slam level, and in Davis Cup)
- Career titles: 0

Doubles
- Career record: 2–2 (at ATP Tour level, Grand Slam level, and in Davis Cup)
- Career titles: 0
- Last updated on: 15 November 2021.

Saud Alhogbani (Arabic: سعود الحقباني; born 15 January 2003) is a Saudi Arabian tennis player.

== Career ==
Alhogbani represents Saudi Arabia at the Davis Cup, where he has a W/L record of 8–9.

Alhogbani was a promising junior tennis player, winning multiple USTA junior tennis tournaments.

== Personal life ==
Alhogbani grew up in Alexandria, Virginia with seven siblings.
