= Kareem Al Allaf =

Syrian tennis player (born 1998)

Kareem Allaf
- Full name: Kareem Al Allaf
- Native name: كريم العلاف
- Country (sports): Syria (2015–22); United States (2022–present)
- Born: March 22, 1998 (age 28) Des Moines, Iowa, United States
- Height: 1.81 m (5 ft 11 in)
- Plays: Right-handed (two-handed backhand)
- College: University of Iowa
- Coach: Ross Wilson, Ammar Allaf
- Prize money: $35,082

Singles
- Career record: 12–5 (at ATP Tour level, Grand Slam level, and in Davis Cup)
- Career titles: 0
- Highest ranking: No. 751 (May 22, 2023)

Doubles
- Career record: 6–4 (at ATP Tour level, Grand Slam level, and in Davis Cup)
- Career titles: 1 ITF
- Highest ranking: No. 704 (August 21, 2023)

Team competitions
- Davis Cup: 18–9 (12–5 in singles)
- Last updated on: December 20, 2024.

Kareem Al Allaf (كريم العلاف; born March 22, 1998) is an American tennis player and tennis coach of Syrian descent. He holds the all-time wins record for singles and doubles combined in college tennis at the University of Iowa.

Allaf has a career-high ATP singles ranking of 751, achieved on May 22, 2023. He also has a career-high ATP doubles ranking of 704, achieved on August 21, 2023. He was also a doubles champion at the ITF World Tennis Tour in the summer of 2019.

Allaf represented the Syria Davis Cup team at the Davis Cup, where he played #1 singles and had a W/L record of 18–9 (12–5 in singles play) in 2015–21. However, the Syrian Tennis Federation banned him because he competed in a match against an Israeli opponent in a tournament in Arkansas in 2022. Consequently, he switched nationalities to represent his birth country, the United States.

== Early life ==
Allaf was born in Des Moines, Iowa. His father is Syrian. He won one ITF Junior title in singles competition,

== College career ==
Allaf graduated from the University of Iowa in 2020 with a degree in Enterprise Leadership and a minor in Communications, before earning a masters in 2022 in Sports and Recreational Management. He holds the all-time wins record for singles and doubles combined in college tennis at the University of Iowa with 164 combined wins for the Hawkeyes, for whom he played from 2016–21.

He won 95 career singles matches and 69 career doubles matches. His 22 doubles victories as a sophomore in 2018 are third on Iowa’s single-season wins list, and his 23 singles victories during his freshman year in 2017 tied for the 11th-most in a single season in the university's history. In 2018, Allaf became the third player in program history to win the Intercollegiate Tennis Association (ITA) Central Regional Singles Championship in Tulsa, Oklahoma. In 2019, he qualified for the ITA Main Draw, and became only the second player from the university to accomplish the feat. In 2020 he was named first-team All-Big Ten, ITA Central Region Senior Player of the Year, and ITA Central Region Most Improved Senior. Allaf earned three All-Big Ten honors.

== Professional career ==
Allaf has a career-high ATP singles ranking of 751, achieved on May 22, 2023. He also has a career-high ATP doubles ranking of 704, achieved on August 21, 2023. He was also a doubles champion at the ITF World Tennis Tour in the summer of 2019.

== Davis Cup; ban by Syria ==
Allaf represented the Syria Davis Cup team at the Davis Cup, where he played #1 singles and had a W/L record of 18–9 (12–5 in singles play) in 2015–21.

The Syrian Tennis Federation banned him, because he competed in a match against an Israeli opponent in a 2022 ITF Men's World Tennis Tour tournament in Fayetteville, Arkansas, in November 2022. Allaf said:

"I respect everyone equally ... Hopefully this doesn't happen again to other athletes from Arab countries .. I think the ITF should get involved in this ... It should never happen again."

Egyptian journalist Reem Abulleil wrote on Twitter: "Syrian tennis player @KareemAllaf played against and defeated Israeli player Nitzan Ricklis last week in a $15k in Fayetteville, Arkansas. As a response, the Syrian Tennis Federation has banned him. Hope @ITFTennis do something. This nonsense has got to stop."

As a result of the Syrian federation's ban, Allaf switched nationalities to represent his birth country, the United States.

== Coaching ==
From 2022–23 he was a volunteer assistant at Mississippi State University. From 2023 to the present he has been a University of Central Florida assistant coach with their UCF Knights tennis team in Orlando, Florida.

== See also ==
- Malek Jaziri, Tunisian tennis player ordered by the Tunisian tennis federation to withdraw from a match against an Israeli; the ITF consequently barred Tunisia from competing in the 2014 Davis Cup.
