= Shaheed Alam =

Singaporean tennis player (born 1998)

- Full name: Muhammad Shaheed Alam Bin Meqsud Alam
- Country (sports): Singapore
- Residence: Singapore
- Born: 9 July 1998 (age 28) Singapore
- Height: 1.7 m (5 ft 7 in)
- Plays: Right-handed (two-handed backhand)
- College: Keiser University
- Prize money: $5,501

Singles
- Career record: 25-25 (at ATP Tour level, Grand Slam level, and in Davis Cup)
- Career titles: 0
- Highest ranking: No. 1743 (5 March 2018)
- Current ranking: No. 1813 (15 February 2021)

Doubles
- Career record: 10-15 (at ATP Tour level, Grand Slam level, and in Davis Cup)
- Career titles: 0
- Highest ranking: No. 2116 (6 January 2020)
- Current ranking: No. 2239 (15 February 2021)
- Last updated on: 15 February 2021.

Shaheed Alam (born 9 July 1998) is a Singaporean tennis player.

Alam has a career high ATP singles ranking of 1743 achieved on 5 March 2018. He also has a career high ATP doubles ranking of 2116 achieved on 6 January 2020.

Alam represents Singapore at the Davis Cup, where he has a W/L record of 29–12.

In October 2023, Alam led Singapore to Davis Cup promotion in the Group 4 Asia/Oceania region. Singapore will compete in Group 3 Asia/Oceania in 2024.

Alam plays for Keiser University Seahawks in the National Association of Intercollegiate Athletes (NAIA) where he has been ranked as high as No. 2 in the nation.
