= Hazem Naw =

Syrian tennis player (born 2000)

- Country (sports): Syria
- Born: 1 January 2000 (age 26) Aleppo, Syria
- Height: 1.83 m (6 ft 0 in)
- Plays: Right-handed (two-handed backhand)
- Coach: Amer Naow
- Prize money: US $81,201

Singles
- Career record: 15–3 (at ATP Tour level, Grand Slam level, and in Davis Cup)
- Career titles: 4 ITF
- Highest ranking: No. 299 (28 October 2024)
- Current ranking: No. 952 (19 October 2026)

Doubles
- Career record: 8–4 (at ATP Tour level, Grand Slam level, and in Davis Cup)
- Career titles: 5 ITF
- Highest ranking: No. 722 (11 November 2024)
- Current ranking: No. 1,241 (19 October 2026)
- Last updated on: 19 October 2026.

Hazem Naw (born 1 January 2000) is a Syrian tennis player. Naw has a career high ATP singles ranking of world No. 299 achieved on 28 October 2024 and a doubles ranking of No. 722 achieved on 11 November 2024. He is currently the No. 1 Syrian player.

Naw represents Syria at the Davis Cup, where he has a W/L record of 23–7.

== Career ==
After a short junior career, Naw began to play ITF events in both the singles and doubles draw. In August 2021, he received a wildcard into the doubles draw of the Platzmann-Sauerland Open, a Challenger event in Germany which he played alongside former top-100 player Dustin Brown.

=== 2024: Historic first ATP Challenger win for Syria ===
Naw made history as the first Syrian tennis player to record a win in a singles Challenger main draw with his victory over Billy Harris at the 2024 Koblenz Open, having qualified for the main draw.

== Personal life ==
Naw is the younger brother of fellow tennis player Amer Naow.

Due to the Syrian Civil War, Naw was forced out of Aleppo and moved to Beirut, Lebanon before playing tennis for local leagues in Germany.

== ATP Challenger and ITF Tour finals ==
=== Singles: 8 (4–4) ===
Legend (singles) ATP Challenger Tour (0–0) ITF World Tennis Tour (4–4)	Finals by surface Hard (2–1) Clay (2–3) Grass (0–0) Carpet (0–0)

Result	W–L	Date	Tournament	Tier	Surface	Opponent	Score
Win	1–0	Jan 2022	M15, Monastir	World Tennis Tour	Hard	(Romania) Sebastian Gima	5–7, 7–6^{(7–5)}, 7–6^{(9–7)}
Loss	1–1	Mar 2023	M15, Kish Island	World Tennis Tour	Clay	(Romania) Dan Alexandru Tomescu	6–7^{(6–8)}, 4–6
Loss	1–2	Mar 2023	M15, Kish Island	World Tennis Tour	Clay	(Russia) Denis Klok	6–3, 1–6, 3–6
Win	2–2	Aug 2023	M15, Trier	World Tennis Tour	Clay	(Germany) Tom Gentzsch	6–4, 6–2
Win	3–2	Nov 2023	M15, Alcalá de Henares	World Tennis Tour	Hard	(Spain) Daniel Mérida	6–4, 6–1
Loss	3–3	Dec 2023	M15, Madrid	World Tennis Tour	Hard	(United Kingdom) Alastair Gray	1–6, 7–6^{(7–5)}, 2–6
Win	4–3	Jan 2024	M15, Kish Island	World Tennis Tour	Clay	(Ukraine) Oleg Prihodko	6–0, 6–4
Loss	4–4	Jul 2024	M15, Metzingen	World Tennis Tour	Clay	(Germany) Florian Broska	5–7, 2–6

=== Doubles: 8 (6–2) ===
Legend (doubles) ATP Challenger Tour (0–0) ITF World Tennis Tour (6–2)	Finals by surface Hard (3–1) Clay (3–1) Grass (0–0) Carpet (0–0)

Result	W–L	Date	Tournament	Tier	Surface	Partner	Opponents	Score
Win	1–0	Aug 2021	M15, Huy	World Tennis Tour	Clay	(Germany) John Sperle	(United Kingdom) Jonathan Binding (United Kingdom) Mark Whitehouse	6–3, 7–5
Win	2–0	Oct 2021	M15, Sozopol	World Tennis Tour	Hard	(Poland) Yann Wójcik	(Russia) Yan Bondarevskiy (Romania) Nicholas David Ionel	6–4, 5–7, [10–6]
Loss	2–1	May 2022	M15, Valldoreix	World Tennis Tour	Clay	(Argentina) Franco Emanuel Egea	(Spain) Álvaro López San Martín (Spain) Daniel Rincón	3–6, 2–6
Loss	2–2	Jun 2022	M15, Vaasa	World Tennis Tour	Hard	(Germany) Robert Strombachs	(Finland) Eero Vasa (Finland) Iiro Vasa	3–6, 4–6
Win	3–2	Aug 2023	M15, Überlingen	World Tennis Tour	Clay	(Germany) Taym Al Azmeh	(Germany) Jakob Schnaitter (Germany) Mark Wallner	7–5, 3–6, [10–7]
Win	4–2	Jun 2024	M15, Kamen	World Tennis Tour	Clay	(Germany) Taym Al Azmeh	(Germany) Jasper Camehn (Germany) Moritz Kudernatsch	1–6, 7–5, [10–5]
Win	5–2	Sep 2026	M15, Monastir	World Tennis Tour	Hard	(Syria) Taym Al Azmeh	(France) Maxence Bertimon (France) Leo Deflandre	7–6^{(7–4)}, 6–4
Win	6–2	Nov 2026	M15, Sharm El Sheikh	World Tennis Tour	Hard	(Germany) Frederic Schlossmann	(Georgia (country)) Aleksandre Bakshi (Georgia (country)) Saba Purtseladze	7–6^{(7–3)}, 7–6^{(7–3)}
