= Brett Baudinet =

Cook Islands businessman and tennis player

Brett Baudinet (born 1 November 1981) is a Cook Islands businessman and tennis player. He has represented the Cook Islands at the Pacific Mini Games, and Oceania at the Davis Cup.

== Personal life ==
Baudinet grew up in the Cook Islands, and moved to New Zealand at the age of 14 to attend King's College, Auckland. In 2000 he moved to the United States, where he attended the University of Michigan and lived in Chicago. He returned to Rarotonga in 2012. He runs a tourism business.

In 2023 he founded a fintech and rideshare company, Smartie. In October 2026 he opened a new resort on Rarotonga.

== Tennis career ==
Baudinet first represented the Cook Islands at tennis at the age of eight in the Aotearoa Māori Tennis Championships in New Zealand. He played in his first Davis Cup match in February 2000. He later moved to the US to study, where he played for the University of Michigan.

In September 2017 he was awarded the Davis Cup Commitment Award for outstanding services to tennis for playing 50 Davis Cup matches.

In October 2018 he was awarded Sportsman of the Year at the Cook Islands Sports Awards.

In March 2021 Baudinet was selected as captain of the Pacific Oceania Davis Cup team, becoming the first Cook Islander to captain the team.

In 2023 he represented Pacific Oceania at the Davis Cup competition in Barbados. In 2024 he competed in his 20th Davis Cup.
