= Vietnam Davis Cup team =

National tennis team

Vietnam
- Nations Ranking: 65 ▲6 (20 September 2021)
- First year: 1964
- Years played: 25
- Ties played (W–L): 84 (52 - 32)
- Most total wins: Đỗ Minh Quân (41 - 22)
- Most singles wins: Đỗ Minh Quân (27 - 13)
- Most doubles wins: Lê Quốc Khánh (21 - 19)
- Best doubles team: Đỗ Minh Quân & Lê Quốc Khánh (7 - 9)
- Most ties played: Lê Quốc Khánh (44), Đỗ Minh Quân (44)
- Most years played: Lê Quốc Khánh (12)

The Vietnam Davis Cup team represents Vietnam in Davis Cup tennis competition and are governed by the Vietnam Tennis Federation. The President of VTF is Mr Nguyễn Danh Thái while the General Secretary is Mr Nguyen Quoc Ky. Commercial and International Affairs is handled by Mr Long Le Hoang.

Vietnam currently compete in the Asia/Oceania Zone of Group III. As South Vietnam they reached the final of Eastern Zone A in 1964, and of Eastern Zone B in 1965, 1969 and of Eastern Zone Preliminary Rounds in 1973.

== History ==
Vietnam competed in its first Davis Cup in 1964 as South Vietnam until 1974 before returning as Vietnam in 2003. After 10 years of competition in Asia/Oceania Groups 3 and 4, the Vietnamese team made it to Group 2 for the very first time in 2014.

== Current team (2025) ==
September 2025

- Nguyễn Văn Phương
- Đinh Viết Tuấn Minh
- Phạm La Hoàng Anh
- Nguyễn Minh Phát
- Vũ Hà Minh Đức

Coach: Nguyễn Phi Anh Vũ

== Results ==
Zone legend
| Color | Zone |
|---|---|
| #6f6 | World Group/Inter-Zonal/Challenge Round |
| #cfc | World Group play-offs/Qualifying Play-offs |
| #ccf | Continental Zone I |
| #ffc | Continental Zone II |
| #fcc | Continental Zone III |
| #f66 | Continental Zone IV |

| Year | Zone | Final round | Final opponent | Score | Result |
|---|---|---|---|---|---|
| 2003 | Asia/Oceania Group IV | Promotional Play-off | Myanmar | 3–0 | Promoted to Asia/Oceania Zone Group III |
| 2004 | Asia/Oceania Group III | 1st to 4th Play-off | Pacific Oceania | 1–2 | Stayed at Asia/Oceania Zone Group III |
| 2005 | Asia/Oceania Group III | 1st to 4th Play-off | Sri Lanka | 2–1 | Stayed at Asia/Oceania Zone Group III |
| 2006 | Asia/Oceania Group III | 5th to 8th Play-off | Singapore | 2–1 | Stayed at Asia/Oceania Zone Group III |
| 2007 | Asia/Oceania Group III | 5th to 8th Play-off | Malaysia | 2–1 | Stayed at Asia/Oceania Zone Group III |
| 2008 | Asia/Oceania Group III | 5th to 8th Play-off | United Arab Emirates | 3–0 | Relegated to Asia/Oceania Zone Group IV |
| 2009 | Asia/Oceania Group IV | Round robin | United Arab Emirates | 2–1 | Promoted to Asia/Oceania Zone Group III |
| 2010 | Asia/Oceania Group III | Promotional Play-off | Iran | 0–2 | Stayed at Asia/Oceania Zone Group III |
| 2011 | Asia/Oceania Group III | Promotional Play-off | Malaysia | 2–1 | Stayed at Asia/Oceania Zone Group III |
| 2012 | Asia/Oceania Group III | 5th to 6th Play-off | Oman | 3–0 | Stayed at Asia/Oceania Zone Group III |
| 2013 | Asia/Oceania Group III | Promotional Play-off | Hong Kong | 2–1 | Promoted to Asia/Oceania Zone Group II |
| 2014 | Asia/Oceania Group II | Relegation Play-off | Sri Lanka | 2–3 | Relegated to Asia/Oceania Zone Group III |
| 2015 | Asia/Oceania Group III | 1st to 4th Play-off | Hong Kong | 2–0 | Promoted to Asia/Oceania Zone Group II |
| 2016 | Asia/Oceania Group II | Second round | Thailand | 0–5 | Stayed at Asia/Oceania Zone Group II |
| 2017 | Asia/Oceania Group II | Relegation Play-off | Iran | 0–5 | Relegated to Asia/Oceania Zone Group III |
| 2018 | Asia/Oceania Group III | Promotional Play-off | Qatar | 3–0 | Promoted to Asia/Oceania Zone Group II^{a} |
| 2019 | Asia/Oceania Group III | 1st to 2nd Play-off | Syria | 2–0 | Promoted to Asia/Oceania Zone Group II |

^a Vietnam stayed at Asia/Oceania Group III for the following year after a format change to the competition.

== See also ==
- Davis Cup
- Vietnam Billie Jean King Cup team
