= Trịnh Linh Giang =

Vietnamese tennis player

- Country (sports): Vietnam
- Residence: Tây Ninh, Vietnam
- Born: 3 August 1997 (age 29) Hanoi, Vietnam
- Height: 1.83 m (6 ft 0 in)
- Plays: Right-handed (two-handed backhand)
- Prize money: $2,352

Singles
- Career record: 8–0 (at ATP Tour level, Grand Slam level, and in Davis Cup)
- Career titles: 0
- Highest ranking: No. 1176 (14 November 2022)

Doubles
- Career record: 0–0 (at ATP Tour level, Grand Slam level, and in Davis Cup)
- Career titles: 0
- Highest ranking: No. 1175 (15 August 2022)
Medal record
Men's Tennis
Representing Vietnam
Southeast Asian Games
Silver medal – second place	2021 Vietnam	Singles
Bronze medal – third place	2021 Vietnam	Doubles
- Last updated on: 30 January 2023.

Trịnh Linh Giang (born 3 August 1997), also known as Giang Trịnh, is a Vietnamese tennis and pickleball player. He is currently ranked world No. 53 in the latter discipline.

Trịnh has a career high ATP singles ranking of 1176 achieved on 14 November 2022.

Trịnh represents Vietnam at the Davis Cup, where he has a W/L record of 4–0.
