= Pacific Oceania Davis Cup team =

Tennis team

Pacific Oceania
- Captain: (Vanuatu) Aymeric MARA
- Nations Ranking: 132 ▼18 (9 February 2026)
- Colors: Sky Blue & Black
- First year: 1995
- Years played: 26
- Ties played (W–L): 97 (51–46)
- Years in World Group: 0 (0–0)
- Best finish: Group II SF (2005)
- Most total wins: (Cook Islands) Brett Baudinet (37–28)
- Most singles wins: (Solomon Islands) Michael Leong (19–12)
- Most doubles wins: (Cook Islands) Brett Baudinet (36–17)
- Best doubles team: (Cook Islands) Brett Baudinet / (Guam) Daniel Llarenas (11–2)
- Most ties played: (Cook Islands) Brett Baudinet (59)
- Most years played: (Cook Islands) Brett Baudinet (17)

The Pacific Oceania Davis Cup team represents the island nations in Oceania, excluding Australia, New Zealand and New Caledonia, in Davis Cup tennis competition and are governed by the Oceania Tennis Federation.

Pacific Oceania on Sunday 19 September 2021 was promoted following the Davis Cup Tie in Amman, Jordan to compete in the 2022 Asia/Oceania Zone of Group II. In August 2022 they were promoted to World Group II.

== Current team ==
Team representing Pacific Oceania vs. El Salvador at the 2024 Davis Cup World Group II Play-offs from 2–3 February 2024:

- (French Polynesia) Heve Kelley
- (Vanuatu) Clement Mainguy
- (French Polynesia) Gillian Osmont
- (Tonga) Matavao Fanguna

== History ==
Pacific Oceania competed in its first Davis Cup in 1995.

== Nations and territories represented ==
- American Samoa
- Cook Islands
- Fiji (1995–1998 / 2002–present)
- Guam (1995–2017)
- Kiribati
- Federated States of Micronesia
- Nauru
- Norfolk Island
- Northern Mariana Islands (1995–2023)
- Palau
- Papua New Guinea
- Samoa
- Solomon Islands
- Tahiti
- Tonga
- Tuvalu
- Vanuatu

== Former squad members ==
Active single players listed in bold and active double players listed also in italic

Player	Total W–L	Singles W–L	Doubles W–L	Number of ties	First year played	Years played
(Cook Islands) Brett Baudinet	37–28	1–11	36–17	59	2000	17
(French Polynesia) Gilles de Gouy	5–3	0–3	5–0	8	2013	2
(American Samoa) Muka Godinet	3–1	2–1	1–0	3	2001	1
(Vanuatu) Cyril Jacobe	15–24	6–14	9–10	28	1999	9
(Tonga) Motuliki Kailahi	13–6	5–5	8–1	10	1995	2
(French Polynesia) **Heve Kelley**	2–2	2–2	0–0	4	2015	1
(Samoa) Juan-Sebastian Langton	26–25	16–17	10–8	35	2002	11
(Solomon Islands) Michael Leong	20–15	19–12	1–3	22	2004	9
(Guam) Daniel Llarenas	19–5	2–1	17–4	21	2011	6
(Vanuatu) Cyrille Mainguy	1–1	0–0	1–1	2	1996	2
(Vanuatu) Aymeric Mara	3–3	3–3	0–0	6	2012	2
(Fiji) Hitesh Morriswala	1–2	0–1	1–1	2	1996	1
(Marshall Islands) West Nott	4–5	4–3	0–2	6	2005	4
(Fiji) **William O'Connell**	1–8	1–8	0–0	9	2013	2
(Vanuatu) Jerome Rovo	0–7	0–3	0–4	6	1999	2
(Samoa) Leon So'onalole	2–5	2–3	0–2	7	2002	3
(Solomon Islands) Lency Tenai	27–21	11–16	16–5	29	1995	7
(Papua New Guinea) Lawrence Tere	8–13	2–10	6–3	10	1998	3
(Fiji) Sanjeev Tikaram	4–6	1–4	3–2	6	1995	3
(Vanuatu) Aymeric Mara	4–6	1–3	3–3	10	2012	3
(French Polynesia) Heve Kelley	6–10	5–10	1–0	15	2015	4
(Northern Mariana Islands) Colin Sinclair	14–2	10–1	4–1	12	2015	4
(Papua New Guinea) Matthew Stubbings	5–4	3–4	2–0	7	2018	2
(Vanuatu) Clement Mainguy	1–2	1–2	0–0	3	2021	1
(French Polynesia) Heimanarii Lai San	0–1	0–0	0–1	1	2021	1

== See also ==
- Davis Cup
- Pacific Oceania Billie Jean King Cup team
