= Malaysia Davis Cup team =

National tennis team

The Malaysia Davis Cup team represents Malaysia in Davis Cup tennis competition and are governed by the Lawn Tennis Association of Malaysia.

Malaysia currently compete in the Asia/Oceania Zone of Group III. They have reached the semifinals of Group II on three occasions.

== History ==
Malaysia competed in its first Davis Cup in 1957.

Dominic Ryan, a British-Malaysian expat is currently team captain. He won a match against China's Hongbin Wang in a 5-7 5-7 6-4 6-0 6-2 reversal.

== Current team (2022) ==
- Naufal Siddiq Kamaruzzaman
- Christian Andre Sheng Liew
- Hao Sheng Koay
- Syed Mohd Agil Syed Naguib

== See also ==
- Davis Cup
- Malaysia Billie Jean King Cup team
