= 2004 Davis Cup =

2004 edition of the Davis Cup

Details
- Duration: 6 February – 5 December
- Edition: 93rd
- Teams: 130

Champion
- Winning nation: Spain

The 2004 Davis Cup was the 93rd edition of the tournament between nations in men's tennis. A total of 130 nations participated in the tournament. In the final, Spain defeated the United States at the Estadio de La Cartuja in Seville, Spain, on 3–5 December, giving Spain their second title. Turkmenistan made its first appearance in the tournament.

== World Group ==
Participating Teams
Argentina	Australia	Austria	Belarus
Canada	Czech Republic	Croatia	France
Morocco	Netherlands	Romania	Russia
Spain	Sweden	Switzerland	United States

=== Draw ===
First round 6–8 February
Adelaide, Australia (hard)
1	Australia	1
Sweden	4
Uncasville, USA (indoor hard)
7	United States	5
Austria	0
Minsk, Belarus (indoor carpet)
4	Russia	2
Belarus	3
Agadir, Morocco (indoor hard)
5	Argentina	5
Morocco	0
Bucharest, Romania (indoor clay)
Romania	2
6	Switzerland	3
Metz, France (indoor clay)
Croatia	1
3	France	4
Maastricht, Netherlands (indoor clay)
Canada	1
8	Netherlands	4
Brno, Czech Republic (indoor carpet)
Czech Republic	2
2	Spain	3

Quarterfinals; 9–11 April
Delray Beach, United States (hard)
Sweden	1
7	United States	4
Minsk, Belarus (indoor carpet)
Belarus	5
5	Argentina	0
Prilly, Switzerland (indoor hard)
6	Switzerland	2
3	France	3
Palma de Mallorca, Spain (clay)
8	Netherlands	1
2	Spain	4

Semifinals; 24–26 September
Charleston, United States (hard)
7	United States	4
Belarus	0
Alicante, Spain (clay)
3	France	1
2	Spain	4

Final; 3–5 December
Seville, Spain (indoor clay)
7	United States	2
2	Spain	3

First round losers compete in play-off ties with Zonal Group I Qualifiers.

=== Final ===
Spain
3
Estadio Olímpico, Seville, Spain
3–5 December 2004
Clay (i)

United States
2

			1	2	3	4	5
1	(Spain) (United States)	Carlos Moyà; Mardy Fish	6; 4	6; 2	6; 3
2	(Spain) (United States)	Rafael Nadal; Andy Roddick	6^{6} 7^{8}	6; 2	7^{8} 6^{6}	6; 2
3	(Spain) (United States)	Juan Carlos Ferrero / Tommy Robredo; Bob Bryan / Mike Bryan	0; 6	3; 6	2; 6
4	(Spain) (United States)	Carlos Moyà; Andy Roddick	6; 2	7^{7} 6^{1}	7^{7} 6^{5}
5	(Spain) (United States)	Tommy Robredo; Mardy Fish	6^{8} 7^{10}	2; 6

== World Group play-offs ==
Date: 24–26 September

Home team	Score	Visiting team	Location	Venue	Door	Surface
Australia	4–1	Morocco	West Perth	Royal Kings Park	Outdoor	Grass
Chile	5–0	Japan	Viña del Mar	Club Naval de Campo Las Salinas	Outdoor	Clay
Croatia	3–2	Belgium	Rijeka	Dvorana Mladosti	Indoor	Carpet
Paraguay	0–5	Czech Republic	Lambaré	Yacht y Golf Club Paraguayo	Outdoor	Clay
Slovakia	3–2	Germany	Bratislava	National Tennis Centre	Indoor	Hard
Austria	3–2	Great Britain	Pörtschach	Werzer Arena Pörtschach	Outdoor	Clay
Romania	4–1	Canada	Bucharest	Clubul Sportiv Progresul Bucuresti	Outdoor	Clay
Russia	5–0	Thailand	Moscow	Olympic Stadium	Indoor	Clay

- Australia, Austria, Croatia, Czech Republic, Romania and Russia will remain in the World Group in 2005.
- Chile and Slovakia are promoted to the World Group in 2005.
- Belgium, Germany, Great Britain, Japan, Paraguay and Thailand will remain in Zonal Group I in 2005.
- Canada and Morocco are relegated to Zonal Group I in 2005.

== Americas Zone ==
=== Group I ===
Second Round Play-offs
Brasília, Brazil (clay)
1	Brazil	1
Peru	4

First Round Play-offs
Caracas, Venezuela (hard)
1	Brazil	2
Venezuela	3
Guayaquil, Ecuador (indoor hard)
Peru	1
2	Ecuador	4

First Round
1	Brazil
bye
Caracas, Venezuela (hard)
Venezuela	1
Paraguay	4
Lima, Peru (clay)
Chile	5
Peru	0
bye
2	Ecuador

Second Round
Bahia, Brazil (clay)
1	Brazil	2
Paraguay	3
Viña del Mar, Chile (clay)
Chile	5
2	Ecuador	0

- Brazil relegated to Group II in 2005.
- Chile and Paraguay advance to World Group Play-off.

=== Group II ===
The Americas Zone was one of the three zones of the regional Davis Cup competition in 2004.

In the Americas Zone there were four different tiers, called groups, in which teams compete against each other to advance to the upper tier. Winners in Group II advanced to the Americas Zone Group I. Teams who lost their respective ties competed in the relegation play-offs, with winning teams remaining in Group II, whereas teams who lost their play-offs were relegated to the Americas Zone Group III in 2005.

== Participating nations ==
- Bahamas
- Cuba
- Dominican Republic
- Haiti
- Jamaica
- Mexico
- Puerto Rico
- Uruguay

=== Draw ===
Play-offs
Bayamón, Puerto Rico (hard)
Puerto Rico	2
Jamaica	3
Havana, Cuba (hard)
Haiti	2
Cuba	3

First Round
Bayamón, Puerto Rico (indoor hard)
1	Bahamas	3
Puerto Rico	2
Kingston, Jamaica (hard)
3	Mexico	4
Jamaica	1
Port-au-Prince, Haiti (clay)
Haiti	2
4	Uruguay	3
Havana, Cuba (hard)
Cuba	1
2	Dominican Republic	4

Second Round
Mexico City, Mexico (clay)
1	Bahamas	0
3	Mexico	5
Santo Domingo, Dominican Rep. (hard)
4	Uruguay	1
2	Dominican Republic	4

Third Round
Toluca, Mexico (clay)
3	Mexico	5
2	Dominican Republic	0

- Puerto Rico and Haiti relegated to Group III in 2005.
- Mexico promoted to Group I in 2005.

== First round ==
=== Puerto Rico vs. Bahamas ===
Puerto Rico
2
Coliseo Rubén Rodríguez, Bayamón, Puerto Rico
6–8 February 2004
Hard (indoors)

Bahamas
3

			1	2	3	4	5
1	(Puerto Rico) (The Bahamas)	Gabriel Montilla; Christopher Eldon	6; 4	2; 6	6; 4	6; 4
2	(Puerto Rico) (The Bahamas)	Luis Haddock; Mark Merklein	1; 6	4; 6	6^{4} 7^{7}
3	(Puerto Rico) (The Bahamas)	Gilberto Álvarez / Gabriel Montilla; Mark Merklein / Bjorn Munroe	4; 6	7^{7} 6^{5}	3; 6	6^{3} 7^{7}
4	(Puerto Rico) (The Bahamas)	Gabriel Montilla; Mark Merklein	0; 6	3; 6	3; 6
5	(Puerto Rico) (The Bahamas)	Ricardo González-Díaz; H'Cone Thompson	6; 4	7; 5

=== Jamaica vs. Mexico ===
Jamaica
1
Liguanea Club, Kingston, Jamaica
6–8 February 2004
Hard

Mexico
4

			1	2	3	4	5
1	(Jamaica) (Mexico)	Scott Willinsky; Miguel Gallardo Valles	4; 6	4; 6	1; 6
2	(Jamaica) (Mexico)	Ryan Russell; Luis-Manuel Flores	6; 3	1; 6	6; 1	6; 4
3	(Jamaica) (Mexico)	Karl Hale / Ryan Russell; Daniel Langre / Víctor Romero	2; 6	1; 6	0; 6
4	(Jamaica) (Mexico)	Ryan Russell; Miguel Gallardo Valles	0; 6	6^{4} 7^{7}	5; 7
5	(Jamaica) (Mexico)	Scott Willinsky; Daniel Langre	6; 4	4; 6	5; 7

=== Haiti vs. Uruguay ===
Haiti
2
Cercle Bellevue, Port-au-Prince, Haiti
6–8 February 2004
Clay

Uruguay
3

			1	2	3	4	5
1	(Haiti) (Uruguay)	Iphton Louis; Pablo Cuevas	4; 6	0; 6	3; 6
2	(Haiti) (Uruguay)	Bertrand Madsen; Federico Sansonetti	6; 2	6; 3	7^{7} 6^{1}
3	(Haiti) (Uruguay)	Iphton Louis / Bertrand Madsen; Pablo Cuevas / Federico Sansonetti	6; 4	6; 4	7^{7} 6^{5}
4	(Haiti) (Uruguay)	Bertrand Madsen; Pablo Cuevas	6^{6} 7^{8}	3; 6	6^{3} 7^{7}
5	(Haiti) (Uruguay)	Iphton Louis; Federico Sansonetti	1; 6	3; 6	6; 3	4; 6

=== Cuba vs. Dominican Republic ===
Cuba
1
Centro Nacional de Tenis '19 de Noviembre', Havana, Cuba
6–8 February 2004
Hard

Dominican Republic
4

			1	2	3	4	5
1	(Cuba) (Dominican Republic)	Sandor Martínez; Víctor Estrella Burgos	1; 6	6^{4} 7^{7}	4; 6
2	(Cuba) (Dominican Republic)	Ricardo Chile; Jhonson García	6; 3	6^{3} 7^{7}	2; 6	6; 3	1; 6
3	(Cuba) (Dominican Republic)	Ricardo Chile / Sandor Martínez; Víctor Estrella Burgos / Jhonson García	6; 4	7^{7} 6^{4}	4; 6	7^{7} 6^{3}
4	(Cuba) (Dominican Republic)	Eddy Gonzalez-Gonzalez; Víctor Estrella Burgos	6; 2	4; 6	6; 0	4; 6	4; 6
5	(Cuba) (Dominican Republic)	Favel-Antonio Freyre-Perdomo; Jose Bernard	3; 6	3; 6

== Second round ==
=== Mexico vs. Bahamas ===
Mexico
5
Centro Deportivo Chapultepec, Mexico City, Mexico
9–11 April 2004
Clay

Bahamas
0

			1	2	3	4	5
1	(Mexico) (The Bahamas)	Alejandro Hernández; Christopher Eldon	6; 0	7; 5	6; 2
2	(Mexico) (The Bahamas)	Miguel Gallardo Valles; Bjorn Munroe	6; 2	6; 1	6; 3
3	(Mexico) (The Bahamas)	Bruno Echagaray / Santiago González; Christopher Eldon / Bjorn Munroe	6; 0	6; 2	6; 3
4	(Mexico) (The Bahamas)	Miguel Gallardo Valles; H'Cone Thompson	6; 0	6; 0
5	(Mexico) (The Bahamas)	Alejandro Hernández; Bjorn Munroe	6; 2	7^{7} 6^{2}

=== Dominican Republic vs. Uruguay ===
Dominican Republic
4
Centro Nacional de Tenis, Santo Domingo, Dominican Republic
9–11 April 2004
Hard

Uruguay
1

			1	2	3	4	5
1	(Dominican Republic) (Uruguay)	Víctor Estrella Burgos; Pablo Cuevas	6; 4	6; 3	7; 5
2	(Dominican Republic) (Uruguay)	Jhonson García; Marcel Felder	7; 5	6; 4	7; 5
3	(Dominican Republic) (Uruguay)	Víctor Estrella Burgos / Jhonson García; Augusto Ricciardi-Castelli / Marcel Felder	3; 6	2; 6	6; 3	7; 5	6; 4
4	(Dominican Republic) (Uruguay)	Michael-Ray Pallares González; Federico Sansonetti	6; 3	6; 3
5	(Dominican Republic) (Uruguay)	Federico Rodríguez; Pablo Cuevas	3; 6	6; 1	3; 6

== Relegation play-offs ==
=== Puerto Rico vs. Jamaica ===
Puerto Rico
2
Centro de Tenis Municipal (Honda), Bayamón, Puerto Rico
9–11 April 2004
Hard

Jamaica
3

			1	2	3	4	5
1	(Puerto Rico) (Jamaica)	Gabriel Montilla; Scott Willinsky	6; 3	7^{8} 6^{6}	6; 4
2	(Puerto Rico) (Jamaica)	Luis Haddock; Ryan Russell	7; 5	6; 3	6; 2
3	(Puerto Rico) (Jamaica)	Gilberto Álvarez / Gabriel Montilla; Ryan Russell / Jermaine Smith	2; 6	6^{1} 7^{7}	3; 6
4	(Puerto Rico) (Jamaica)	Gabriel Montilla; Ryan Russell	7^{7} 6^{3}	3; 6	0; 6	2; 6
5	(Puerto Rico) (Jamaica)	Juan Ríos; Scott Willinsky	6; 2	6^{5} 7^{7}	2; 6	4; 6

=== Cuba vs. Haiti ===
Cuba
3
Centro Nacional de Tenis "19 de Noviembre", Havana, Cuba
9–11 April 2004
Hard

Haiti
2

			1	2	3	4	5
1	(Cuba) (Haiti)	Eddy Gonzalez-Gonzalez; Bertrand Madsen	5; 7	2; 6	3; 6
2	(Cuba) (Haiti)	Ricardo Chile; Olivier Sajous	6; 4	6; 0	6; 0
3	(Cuba) (Haiti)	Ricardo Chile / Sandor Martínez; Iphton Louis / Bertrand Madsen	6; 4	6; 3	6; 3
4	(Cuba) (Haiti)	Ricardo Chile; Bertrand Madsen	6; 2	6; 3	6; 3
5	(Cuba) (Haiti)	Edgar Hernandez-Perez; Olivier Sajous	7; 5	6^{6} 7^{8}	2; 6

== Third round ==
=== Mexico vs. Dominican Republic ===
Mexico
5
Club Deportivo Toluca, Toluca, Mexico
24–26 September 2004
Clay

Dominican Republic
0

			1	2	3	4	5
1	(Mexico) (Dominican Republic)	Alejandro Hernández; Jhonson García	6; 4	6; 4	6; 4
2	(Mexico) (Dominican Republic)	Miguel Gallardo Valles; Víctor Estrella Burgos	6; 3	6; 4	3; 6	7^{7} 6^{5}
3	(Mexico) (Dominican Republic)	Bruno Echagaray / Santiago González; Víctor Estrella Burgos / Jhonson García	6; 2	6; 3	7^{7} 6^{4}
4	(Mexico) (Dominican Republic)	Santiago González; Jhonson García	6; 1	7; 5
5	(Mexico) (Dominican Republic)	Alejandro Hernández; Federico Rodríguez	6; 1	6; 4

=== Group III ===
- Venue: Country Club de Tegucigalpa, Tegucigalpa, Honduras (outdoor hard)
- Date: 4-8 February

Rank	Team
1	Colombia
2	Netherlands Antilles
3	El Salvador
4	Bolivia
5	Honduras
6	Panama
7	U.S. Virgin Islands
8	Trinidad and Tobago

- Colombia and Netherlands Antilles promoted to Group II in 2005.
- U.S. Virgin Islands and Trinidad and Tobago relegated to Group IV in 2005.

=== Group IV ===
- Venue: Costa Rica Country Club, Escazú, Costa Rica (outdoor hard)
- Date: 7 - 11 April

Team	Pld	W	L	MF	MA
Guatemala	5	5	0	14	1
Saint Lucia	5	4	1	10	5
Barbados	5	2	3	8	7
Costa Rica	5	2	3	7	8
Bermuda	5	1	4	3	12
Eastern Caribbean	5	1	4	3	12

Guatemala and St.Lucia promoted to Group III for 2005.

== Asia/Oceania Zone ==
=== Group I ===
Second Round Play-offs
Islamabad, Pakistan (clay)
Pakistan	3
New Zealand	2

First Round Play-offs
Kaohsiung, Taiwan (hard)
Pakistan	0
Chinese Taipei	5
Jakarta, Indonesia (hard)
Indonesia	5
New Zealand	0

First Round
Nonthaburi, Thailand (indoor hard)
1	Thailand	5
Pakistan	0
Kaohsiung, Taiwan (hard)
3	Uzbekistan	4
Chinese Taipei	1
Jakarta, Indonesia (hard)
Indonesia	2
4	Japan	3
Invercargill, New Zealand (indoor carpet)
New Zealand	2
2	India	3

Second Round
Bangkok, Thailand (indoor hard)
1	Thailand	4
3	Uzbekistan	1
Osaka, Japan (hard)
4	Japan	3
2	India	2

- New Zealand relegated to Group II in 2005.
- Thailand and Japan advance to World Group Play-off.

=== Group II ===
Play-offs
Tehran, Iran (clay)
Malaysia	1
Iran	4
Manila, Philippines (indoor clay)
Philippines	4
2	Hong Kong	1

First Round
Kuala Lumpur, Malaysia (indoor hard)
1	South Korea	5
Malaysia	0
Beirut, Lebanon (indoor carpet)
4	Lebanon	3
Iran	2
Manila, Philippines (indoor clay)
Philippines	1
3	China	4
Causeway Bay, Hong Kong (hard)
2	Hong Kong	1
Kuwait	3

Second Round
Busan, South Korea (hard)
1	South Korea	5
4	Lebanon	0
Nanjing, China (indoor hard)
3	China	5
Kuwait	0

Third Round
Nanjing, China (hard)
1	South Korea	2
3	China	3

- Malaysia and Hong Kong relegated to Group III in 2005.
- China promoted to Group I in 2005.

=== Group III ===
Venue: Phu Tho Tennis Centre, Ho Chi Minh City, Vietnam (hard)
Date: 7–11 April

Pool A

Pos	Team	Pld	W	L	Qualification	(Kazakhstan)	(Tajikistan)	(Qatar)	(Oman)
1	Kazakhstan	3	3	0	Advance to Promotion pool	—	3–0	3–0	3–0
2	Tajikistan	3	2	1	Advance to Promotion pool	0–3	—	3–0	3–0
3	Qatar	3	1	2	Advance to Relegation pool	0–3	0–3	—	3–0
4	Oman	3	0	3	Advance to Relegation pool	0–3	0–3	0–3	—

Pool B

Pos	Team	Pld	W	L	Qualification	(Pacific Oceania)	(Vietnam)	(Bahrain)	(Syria)
1	Pacific Oceania	3	3	0	Advance to Promotion pool	—	2–1	3–0	3–0
2	Vietnam	3	2	1	Advance to Promotion pool	1–2	—	2–1	3–0
3	Bahrain	3	1	2	Advance to Relegation pool	0–3	1–2	—	2–1
4	Syria	3	0	3	Advance to Relegation pool	0–3	0–3	1–2	—

Promotion pool

Pos	Team	Pld	W	L	Promotion	(Kazakhstan)	(Pacific Oceania)	(Vietnam)	(Tajikistan)
1	Kazakhstan	3	3	0	Promoted to Group II	—	2–1	3–0	3–0 (Note: Carried over from Pool A)
2	Pacific Oceania	3	2	1	Promoted to Group II	1–2	—	2–1 (Note: Carried over from Pool B)	2–1
3	Vietnam	3	1	2		0–3	1–2	—	2–0
4	Tajikistan	3	0	3		0–3	1–2	0–2	—

Notes:

Relegation pool

Pos	Team	Pld	W	L	Qualification	(Bahrain)	(Qatar)	(Oman)	(Syria)
1	Bahrain	3	3	0		—	2–1	3–0	2–1 (Note: Carried over from Pool B)
2	Qatar	3	2	1		1–2	—	3–0 (Note: Carried over from Pool A)	3–0
3	Oman	3	1	2	Relegated to Group IV	0–3	3–0	—	2–1
4	Syria	3	0	3	Relegated to Group IV	1–2	0–3	1–2	—

=== Group IV ===
Venue: Al Hussein Sport City, Amman, Jordan (hard)
Date: 7–11 April

	Pool A	KSA	SIN	JOR	UAE	BRU	TKM
1	Saudi Arabia (4–1)		3–0	2–1	0–3	3–0	3–0
2	Singapore (4–1)	0–3		2–1	2–1	3–0	3–0
3	Jordan (3–2)	1–2	1–2		2–1	3–0	2–1
4	United Arab Emirates (3–2)	3–0	1–2	1–2		3–0	2–1
5	Brunei (1–4)	0–3	0–3	0–3	0–3		2–1
6	Turkmenistan (0–5)	0–3	0–3	1–2	1–2	1–2	

	Pool B	SRI	BAN	MYA	KGZ	IRQ
1	Sri Lanka (4–0)		3–0	2–1	3–0	3–0
2	Bangladesh (3–1)	0–3		2–1	3–0	3–0
3	Myanmar (1–3)	1–2	1–2		2–1	1–2
4	Kyrgyzstan (1–3)	0–3	0–3	1–2		2–1
5	Iraq (1–3)	0–3	0–3	2–1	1–2	

- Saudi Arabia and Sri Lanka promoted to Group III in 2005.

== Europe/Africa Zone ==
=== Group I ===
Second round Play-offs
Ramat HaSharon, Israel (hard)
Israel	3
Finland	2
Pretoria, South Africa (hard)
Greece	1
South Africa	4

First round Play-offs
Israel
bye
bye
Finland
Greece
bye
bye
South Africa

First round
S	Germany
bye
Israel
bye
S	Great Britain
bye
Esch/Alzette, Luxembourg (indoor hard)
Finland	1
Luxembourg	4
Harare, Zimbabwe (indoor hard)
Greece	2
Zimbabwe	3
bye
S	Belgium
bye
South Africa
bye
S	Slovakia

Second round
Alsdorf, Germany (indoor hard)
S	Germany	5
Israel	0
Esch/Alzette, Luxembourg (indoor hard)
S	Great Britain	4
Luxembourg	1
Tournai, Belgium (indoor clay)
Zimbabwe	1
S	Belgium	4
Johannesburg, South Africa (grass)
South Africa	2
S	Slovakia	3

- Finland and Greece relegated to Group II in 2005.
- Germany, Great Britain, Belgium, and Slovakia advance to World Group Play-off.

=== Group II ===
The Europe/Africa Zone was one of the three zones of the regional Davis Cup competition in 2004.

In the Europe/Africa Zone there were four different tiers, called groups, in which teams competed against each other to advance to the upper tier. Winners in Group II advanced to the Europe/Africa Zone Group I. Teams who lost their respective ties competed in the relegation play-offs, with winning teams remaining in Group II, whereas teams who lost their play-offs were relegated to the Europe/Africa Zone Group III in 2005.

== Participating nations ==
- Algeria
- Bulgaria
- Denmark
- Egypt
- Georgia
- Hungary
- Ireland
- Italy
- Latvia
- Norway
- Poland
- Portugal
- Serbia and Montenegro
- Slovenia
- Tunisia
- Ukraine

=== Draw ===
Relegation Play-offs
Tbilisi, Georgia (clay)
Georgia	3
Egypt	2
Slovenia
S	Denmark
S	Slovenia	w/o
Liepāja, Latvia (clay)
Tunisia	2
S	Latvia	3
Donetsk, Ukraine (hard)
S	Ireland	1
Ukraine	4

First Round
Cagliari, Italy (clay)
S	Italy	3
Georgia	2
Sofia, Bulgaria (indoor carpet)
S	Bulgaria	5
Egypt	0
Algiers, Algeria (clay)
S	Denmark
Algeria	w/o
Portorož, Slovenia (clay)
S	Slovenia	2
Poland	3
Tunis, Tunisia (hard)
Tunisia	2
S	Portugal	3
Belgrade, Serbia-Mont. (indoor carpet)
Latvia	0
S	Serbia and Montenegro	5
Dublin, Ireland (indoor carpet)
Hungary	4
S	Ireland	1
Oslo, Norway (indoor hard)
Ukraine	2
S	Norway	3

Second Round
Teramo, Italy (clay)
S	Italy	5
S	Bulgaria	0
Gdynia, Poland (clay)
Algeria	1
Poland	4
Maia, Portugal (clay)
S	Portugal	0
S	Serbia and Montenegro	5
Szeged, Hungary (clay)
Hungary	3
S	Norway	2

Third Round
Livorno, Italy (clay)
S	Italy	3
Poland	2
Szeged, Hungary (clay)
S	Serbia and Montenegro	3
Hungary	0

- Egypt, Denmark, Tunisia, and Ireland relegated to Group III in 2005.
- Italy and Serbia and Montenegro promoted to Group I in 2005.

== First round ==
=== Italy vs. Georgia ===
Italy
3
Tennis Club Cagliari, Cagliari, Italy
9–11 April 2004
Clay

Georgia
2

			1	2	3	4	5
1	(Italy) (Georgia (country))	Alessio di Mauro; Irakli Ushangishvili	6; 1	6; 0	6; 2
2	(Italy) (Georgia (country))	Andreas Seppi; Irakli Labadze	4; 6	5; 7	6; 1	6; 2	2; 6
3	(Italy) (Georgia (country))	Massimo Bertolini / Giorgio Galimberti; Lado Chikhladze / Irakli Labadze	7^{7} 6^{5}	7; 5	6; 4
4	(Italy) (Georgia (country))	Giorgio Galimberti; Irakli Labadze	1; 6	2; 6	7; 5	3; 6
5	(Italy) (Georgia (country))	Andreas Seppi; Lado Chikhladze	6; 2	6; 4	6; 4

=== Bulgaria vs. Egypt ===
Bulgaria
5
Sofia Tennis Hall, Sofia, Bulgaria
9–11 April 2004
Carpet (indoors)

Egypt
0

			1	2	3	4	5
1	(Bulgaria) (Egypt)	Ivaylo Traykov; Karim Maamoun	6; 2	6; 3	6; 4
2	(Bulgaria) (Egypt)	Todor Enev; Mohamed Mamoun	6; 2	6; 0	6; 2
3	(Bulgaria) (Egypt)	Todor Enev / Ivaylo Traykov; Amr Ghoneim / Karim Maamoun	6; 3	7; 5	6; 2
4	(Bulgaria) (Egypt)	Ilia Kushev; Amr Ghoneim	6; 2	6; 2
5	(Bulgaria) (Egypt)	Yordan Kanev; Karim Maamoun	7^{7} 6^{1}	6; 3

=== Slovenia vs. Poland ===
Slovenia
2
ŠRC Marina Portorož, Portorož, Slovenia
9–11 April 2004
Clay

Poland
3

			1	2	3	4	5
1	(Slovenia) (Poland)	Marko Tkalec; Bartłomiej Dąbrowski	6; 4	6; 3	6; 0
2	(Slovenia) (Poland)	Luka Gregorc; Łukasz Kubot	6^{5} 7^{7}	6^{2} 7^{7}	3; 6
3	(Slovenia) (Poland)	Andrej Kračman / Boštjan Ošabnik; Mariusz Fyrstenberg / Marcin Matkowski	1; 6	5; 7	6^{2} 7^{7}
4	(Slovenia) (Poland)	Marko Tkalec; Łukasz Kubot	6; 1	7^{7} 6^{2}	4; 6	3; 6	6; 4
5	(Slovenia) (Poland)	Andrej Kračman; Mariusz Fyrstenberg	5; 7	6; 0	2; 6	3; 6

=== Tunisia vs. Portugal ===
Tunisia
2
Centre National de Tennis, Tunis, Tunisia
9–11 April 2004
Hard

Portugal
3

			1	2	3	4	5
1	(Tunisia) (Portugal)	Haythem Abid; Leonardo Tavares	6^{5} 7^{7}	1; 6	6; 4	2; 6
2	(Tunisia) (Portugal)	Malek Jaziri; Bernardo Mota	6; 2	1; 6	5; 7	7^{7} 6^{4}	8; 6
3	(Tunisia) (Portugal)	Haythem Abid / Malek Jaziri; Fred Gil / Leonardo Tavares	5; 7	3; 6	2; 6
4	(Tunisia) (Portugal)	Haythem Abid; Fred Gil	4; 6	3; 6	5; 7
5	(Tunisia) (Portugal)	Malek Jaziri; Rui Machado	6; 4	6; 3

=== Serbia and Montenegro vs. Latvia ===
Serbia and Montenegro
5
Tennis Club Gemax, Belgrade, Serbia and Montenegro
9–11 April 2004
Carpet (indoors)

Latvia
0

			1	2	3	4	5
1	(Serbia and Montenegro) (Latvia)	Nenad Zimonjić; Andis Juška	6; 3	6; 2	6; 4
2	(Serbia and Montenegro) (Latvia)	Janko Tipsarević; Deniss Pavlovs	6; 0	6; 0	6; 3
3	(Serbia and Montenegro) (Latvia)	Dejan Petrović / Nenad Zimonjić; Deniss Pavlovs / Jānis Skroderis	6; 4	6; 0	6; 3
4	(Serbia and Montenegro) (Latvia)	Janko Tipsarević; Andis Juška	6; 4	6; 4
5	(Serbia and Montenegro) (Latvia)	Novak Djokovic; Jānis Skroderis	6; 2	6; 2

=== Ireland vs. Hungary ===
Ireland
1
Fitzwilliam Lawn Tennis Club, Dublin, Ireland
9–11 April 2004
Carpet (indoors)

Hungary
4

			1	2	3	4	5
1	(Republic of Ireland) (Hungary)	Peter Clarke; Gergely Kisgyörgy	4; 6	4; 6	4; 6
2	(Republic of Ireland) (Hungary)	Kevin Sorensen; Kornél Bardóczky	6; 3	7; 5	4; 6	6^{5} 7^{7}	3; 6
3	(Republic of Ireland) (Hungary)	Eoin Collins / David J. Mullins; Kornél Bardóczky / Gergely Kisgyörgy	6; 4	1; 6	5; 7	6; 1	4; 6
4	(Republic of Ireland) (Hungary)	Peter Clarke; György Balázs	3; 6	1; 6
5	(Republic of Ireland) (Hungary)	Kevin Sorensen; Gergely Kisgyörgy						w/o

=== Norway vs. Ukraine ===
Norway
3
Riksanlegget for Tennis, Oslo, Norway
9–11 April 2004
Hard (indoors)

Ukraine
2

			1	2	3	4	5
1	(Norway) (Ukraine)	Jan Frode Andersen; Sergei Yaroshenko	4; 6	6; 0	7^{7} 6^{5}	6; 2
2	(Norway) (Ukraine)	Stian Boretti; Orest Tereshchuk	1; 6	6; 3	6; 4	6; 2
3	(Norway) (Ukraine)	Jan Frode Andersen / Stian Boretti; Mikhail Filima / Orest Tereshchuk	6; 4	6; 4	7^{7} 6^{3}
4	(Norway) (Ukraine)	Erling Tveit; Mikhail Filima	4; 6	3; 6
5	(Norway) (Ukraine)	Frederick Sundsten; Sergei Yaroshenko	3; 6	3; 6

== Second round ==
=== Italy vs. Bulgaria ===
Italy
5
Circolo Tennis Teramo, Teramo, Italy
16–18 July 2004
Clay

Bulgaria
0

			1	2	3	4	5
1	(Italy) (Bulgaria)	Filippo Volandri; Ivaylo Traykov	6; 4	6; 2	6; 4
2	(Italy) (Bulgaria)	Potito Starace; Todor Enev	6; 1	6; 2	6; 3
3	(Italy) (Bulgaria)	Massimo Bertolini / Andreas Seppi; Yordan Kanev / Ilia Kushev	6; 4	6; 0	6; 1
4	(Italy) (Bulgaria)	Filippo Volandri; Ilia Kushev	6; 2	6; 0
5	(Italy) (Bulgaria)	Andreas Seppi; Yordan Kanev	6; 2	7; 5

=== Poland vs. Algeria ===
Poland
4
Tennis Club Arka, Gdynia, Poland
16–18 July 2004
Clay

Algeria
1

			1	2	3	4	5
1	(Poland) (Algeria)	Łukasz Kubot; Abdelhak Hameurlaïne	6; 1	7^{7} 6^{3}	6; 1
2	(Poland) (Algeria)	Marcin Matkowski; Lamine Ouahab	1; 6	7; 5	3; 6	4; 6
3	(Poland) (Algeria)	Mariusz Fyrstenberg / Marcin Matkowski; Rachid Baba-Aïssa / Abdel-Wahid Henni	6; 4	6; 1	6; 0
4	(Poland) (Algeria)	Łukasz Kubot; Lamine Ouahab	6; 2	7^{7} 6^{1}	6; 3
5	(Poland) (Algeria)	Filip Urban; Rachid Baba-Aïssa	7^{8} 6^{6}	6; 2

=== Portugal vs. Serbia and Montenegro ===
Portugal
0
Complexo Municipal de Ténis da Maia, Maia, Portugal
16–18 July 2004
Clay

Serbia and Montenegro
5

			1	2	3	4	5
1	(Portugal) (Serbia and Montenegro)	Leonardo Tavares; Boris Pašanski	6; 3	1; 6	6; 1	1; 6	2; 6
2	(Portugal) (Serbia and Montenegro)	Fred Gil; Janko Tipsarević	2; 6	4; 6	1; 6
3	(Portugal) (Serbia and Montenegro)	Fred Gil / Leonardo Tavares; Nikola Ćirić / Dušan Vemić	6; 1	7^{7} 6^{5}	3; 6	1; 6	4; 6
4	(Portugal) (Serbia and Montenegro)	Rui Machado; Dušan Vemić	3; 6	3; 6
5	(Portugal) (Serbia and Montenegro)	Fred Gil; Boris Pašanski	7^{7} 6^{3}	2; 6	0; 6

=== Hungary vs. Norway ===
Hungary
3
Gellért Szabadidő Központ, Szeged, Hungary
16–18 July 2004
Clay

Norway
2

			1	2	3	4	5
1	(Hungary) (Norway)	Kornél Bardóczky; Helge Koll-Frafjord	6; 2	6; 1	6; 1
2	(Hungary) (Norway)	Sebő Kiss; Jan Frode Andersen	4; 6	4; 6	6; 3	4; 6
3	(Hungary) (Norway)	Kornél Bardóczky / Gergely Kisgyörgy; Jan Frode Andersen / Frederick Sundsten	6; 3	6; 4	6; 3
4	(Hungary) (Norway)	Kornél Bardóczky; Jan Frode Andersen	3; 6	4; 6	7^{10} 6^{8}	6; 4	3; 6
5	(Hungary) (Norway)	György Balázs; Helge Koll-Frafjord	6; 0	6; 2	6; 4

== Relegation play-offs ==
=== Georgia vs. Egypt ===
Georgia
3
Leila Meskhi Tennis, Tbilisi, Georgia
16–18 July 2004
Clay

Egypt
2

			1	2	3	4	5
1	(Georgia (country)) (Egypt)	Irakli Ushangishvili; Karim Maamoun	1; 6	7^{7} 6^{4}	6; 4	7; 5
2	(Georgia (country)) (Egypt)	Irakli Labadze; Mohamed Mamoun	6; 3	6; 3	6; 2
3	(Georgia (country)) (Egypt)	Lado Chikhladze / Irakli Labadze; Karim Maamoun / Mohamed Mamoun	6; 3	6; 2	6; 2
4	(Georgia (country)) (Egypt)	Lado Chikhladze; Omar Hedayet	3; 6	1; 6
5	(Georgia (country)) (Egypt)	David Kvernadze; Mohamed Mamoun	4; 6	3; 6

=== Latvia vs. Tunisia ===
Latvia
3
Liepāja's Tennis Sport School, Liepāja, Latvia
16–18 July 2004
Clay

Tunisia
2

			1	2	3	4	5
1	(Latvia) (Tunisia)	Andis Juška; Malek Jaziri	4; 6	3; 6	4; 6
2	(Latvia) (Tunisia)	Deniss Pavlovs; Haythem Abid	6; 0	4; 6	6; 4	7; 5
3	(Latvia) (Tunisia)	Andis Juška / Deniss Pavlovs; Tarek Ben Soltane / Malek Jaziri	6; 3	6; 1	6; 1
4	(Latvia) (Tunisia)	Andis Juška; Haythem Abid	6; 0	6; 0	6; 4
5	(Latvia) (Tunisia)	Adrians Žguns; Malek Jaziri	5; 7	4; 6

=== Ukraine vs. Ireland ===
Ukraine
4
Tennis Club Viccourt, Donetsk, Ukraine
16–18 July 2004
Hard

Ireland
1

			1	2	3	4	5
1	(Ukraine) (Republic of Ireland)	Orest Tereshchuk; Conor Niland	6; 3	6; 3	6; 3
2	(Ukraine) (Republic of Ireland)	Sergei Yaroshenko; Kevin Sorensen	1; 6	4; 6	6; 4	2; 6
3	(Ukraine) (Republic of Ireland)	Mikhail Filima / Orest Tereshchuk; John Doran / David J. Mullins	7^{7} 6^{3}	6; 3	7; 5
4	(Ukraine) (Republic of Ireland)	Orest Tereshchuk; Kevin Sorensen	6; 4	6; 3	6; 2
5	(Ukraine) (Republic of Ireland)	Dmytro Tolok; David J. Mullins	7; 5	6; 4

== Third round ==
=== Italy vs. Poland ===
Italy
3
Tennis Club, Livorno, Italy
24–26 September 2004
Clay

Poland
2

			1	2	3	4	5
1	(Italy) (Poland)	Filippo Volandri; Michał Przysiężny	6; 1	6; 2	6; 1
2	(Italy) (Poland)	Potito Starace; Łukasz Kubot	6; 4	6; 3	6; 4
3	(Italy) (Poland)	Massimo Bertolini / Andreas Seppi; Mariusz Fyrstenberg / Marcin Matkowski	3; 6	6; 2	4; 6	4; 6
4	(Italy) (Poland)	Filippo Volandri; Łukasz Kubot	6; 3	4; 6	1; 6	7^{7} 6^{4}	2; 6
5	(Italy) (Poland)	Potito Starace; Mariusz Fyrstenberg	2; 6	6; 3	4; 6	6; 3	7; 5

=== Hungary vs. Serbia and Montenegro ===
Hungary
0
Gellért Szabadidő Központ, Szeged, Hungary
24–26 September 2004
Clay

Serbia and Montenegro
3

			1	2	3	4	5
1	(Hungary) (Serbia and Montenegro)	Kornél Bardóczky; Boris Pašanski	7^{7} 6^{5}	4; 6	4; 6	2; 6
2	(Hungary) (Serbia and Montenegro)	György Balázs; Janko Tipsarević	1; 6	4; 6	2; 6
3	(Hungary) (Serbia and Montenegro)	Kornél Bardóczky / Gergely Kisgyörgy; Dušan Vemić / Nenad Zimonjić	3; 6	2; 6	2; 6
4	(Hungary) (Serbia and Montenegro)	Kornél Bardóczky; Janko Tipsarević						not played
5	(Hungary) (Serbia and Montenegro)	György Balázs; Boris Pašanski						not played

=== Group III ===
==== Zone A ====
Venue: Namibia National Tennis Stadium, Windhoek, Namibia (hard)
Date: 12–16 May

	Group A	CIV	TUR	KEN
1	Ivory Coast (2–0)		2–1	3–0
2	Turkey (1–1)	1–2		3–0
3	Kenya (0–2)	0–3	0–3	

	Group B	GHA	NAM	MAD
1	Ghana (2–0)		2–1	2–1
2	Namibia (1–1)	1–2		3–0
3	Madagascar (0–2)	1–2	0–3	

(scores in italics carried over)

	1st–4th Play-off	CIV	GHA	TUR	NAM
1	Ivory Coast (3–0)		2–1	2–1	3–0
2	Ghana (2–1)	1–2		2–1	2–1
3	Turkey (1–2)	1–2	1–2		3–0
4	Namibia (0–3)	0–3	1–2	0–3	

	5th–6th Play-off	KEN	MAD
1	Kenya (1–0)		3–0
2	Madagascar (0–1)	0–3	

- Ivory Coast and Ghana promoted to Group II in 2005.
- Benin and Togo withdrew from the tournament and relegated to Group IV in 2005.

The Europe/Africa Zone was one of the three zones of the regional Davis Cup competition in 2004.

In the Europe/Africa Zone there were four different tiers, called groups, in which teams competed against each other to advance to the upper tier. Group III was split into two tournaments. One tournament was held in Namibia National Tennis Stadium, Windhoek, Namibia, May 12–16, on outdoor hard courts, while the other was held in Orange Tennis Centre, Kaunas, Lithuania, February 2–8, on indoor carpet courts.

== Format ==
Benin and Togo withdrew from the Windhoek tournament and relegated to Europe/Africa Zone Group IV in 2005. The six remaining teams in the Windhoek tournament were split into two pools and played in a round-robin format. The top two teams of each pool advanced to the promotion pool, from which the two top teams were promoted to the Europe/Africa Zone Group II in 2005. The remaining teams of each group played against each other in the 5th–6th Play-off and remained in Group III in 2005.

== Pool A ==
	Group A	CIV	TUR	KEN
1	Ivory Coast (2–0)		2–1	3–0
2	Turkey (1–1)	1–2		3–0
3	Kenya (0–2)	0–3	0–3	

=== Turkey vs. Kenya ===
Turkey
3
Namibia National Tennis Stadium, Windhoek, Namibia
12 May 2004
Hard

Kenya
0

			1	2	3
1	(Turkey) (Kenya)	Haluk Akkoyun; Christian Vitulli	6; 4	6; 0
2	(Turkey) (Kenya)	Ergün Zorlu; Allan Cooper	6; 1	6; 2
3	(Turkey) (Kenya)	Haluk Akkoyun / Esat Tanık; Allan Cooper / Christian Vitulli	7; 5	6; 3

=== Ivory Coast vs. Kenya ===
Ivory Coast
3
Namibia National Tennis Stadium, Windhoek, Namibia
13 May 2004
Hard

Kenya
0

			1	2	3
1	(Ivory Coast) (Kenya)	Charles Irie; Christian Vitulli	6; 4	6; 0
2	(Ivory Coast) (Kenya)	Claude N'Goran; Allan Cooper	6; 1	6; 3
3	(Ivory Coast) (Kenya)	Claude N'Goran / Nouhoun Sangaré; Aldrin Ndinya / Christian Vitulli	6; 1	6; 3

=== Ivory Coast vs. Turkey ===
Ivory Coast
2
Namibia National Tennis Stadium, Windhoek, Namibia
14 May 2004
Hard

Turkey
1

			1	2	3
1	(Ivory Coast) (Turkey)	Charles Irie; Haluk Akkoyun	4; 6	1; 6
2	(Ivory Coast) (Turkey)	Claude N'Goran; Ergün Zorlu	6; 2	6; 3
3	(Ivory Coast) (Turkey)	Claude N'Goran / Nouhoun Sangaré; Haluk Akkoyun / Ergün Zorlu	6^{0} 7^{7}	7^{11} 6^{9}	6; 2

== Pool B ==
	Group B	GHA	NAM	MAD
1	Ghana (2–0)		2–1	2–1
2	Namibia (1–1)	1–2		3–0
3	Madagascar (0–2)	1–2	0–3	

=== Madagascar vs. Namibia ===
Madagascar
0
Namibia National Tennis Stadium, Windhoek, Namibia
12 May 2004
Hard

Namibia
3

			1	2	3
1	(Madagascar) (Namibia)	Donne-Dubert Radison; Jurgens Strydom	7^{8} 6^{6}	6^{4} 7^{7}	1; 6
2	(Madagascar) (Namibia)	Jacob Rasolondrazana; Johan Theron	6; 2	2; 6	5; 7
3	(Madagascar) (Namibia)	Harivony Andrianafetra / Jean-Marc Randriamanalina; Henrico Du Plessis / Johan Theron	3; 6	2; 6

=== Ghana vs. Namibia ===
Ghana
2
Namibia National Tennis Stadium, Windhoek, Namibia
13 May 2004
Hard

Namibia
1

			1	2	3
1	(Ghana) (Namibia)	Henry Adjei-Darko; Jurgens Strydom	6^{11} 7^{13}	7^{7} 6^{5}	8; 6
2	(Ghana) (Namibia)	Gunther Darkey; Johan Theron	6; 4	4; 0		retired
3	(Ghana) (Namibia)	Gunther Darkey / Samuel Fumi; Henrico Du Plessis / Jurgens Strydom	4; 6	6; 3	3; 6

=== Ghana vs. Madagascar ===
Ghana
2
Namibia National Tennis Stadium, Windhoek, Namibia
14 May 2004
Hard

Madagascar
1

			1	2	3
1	(Ghana) (Madagascar)	Henry Adjei-Darko; Donne-Dubert Radison	6; 3	6; 1
2	(Ghana) (Madagascar)	Gunther Darkey; Jacob Rasolondrazana	5; 7	4; 6
3	(Ghana) (Madagascar)	Henry Adjei-Darko / Gunther Darkey; Harivony Andrianafetra / Jacob Rasolondrazana	6; 2	7; 5

== Promotion pool ==
The top two teams from each of Pools A and B advanced to the Promotion pool. Results and points from games against the opponent from the preliminary round were carried forward.

(scores in italics carried over from Groups)

	1st–4th Play-off	CIV	GHA	TUR	NAM
1	Ivory Coast (3–0)		2–1	2–1	3–0
2	Ghana (2–1)	1–2		2–1	2–1
3	Turkey (1–2)	1–2	1–2		3–0
4	Namibia (0–3)	0–3	1–2	0–3	

Ivory Coast and Ghana promoted to Group II in 2005.

=== Ivory Coast vs. Namibia ===
Ivory Coast
3
Namibia National Tennis Stadium, Windhoek, Namibia
15 May 2004
Hard

Namibia
0

			1	2	3
1	(Ivory Coast) (Namibia)	Charles Irie; Jurgens Strydom	7^{7} 6^{2}	6; 2
2	(Ivory Coast) (Namibia)	Claude N'Goran; Johan Theron	6; 1	7^{7} 6^{1}
3	(Ivory Coast) (Namibia)	Claude N'Goran / Nouhoun Sangaré; Henrico Du Plessis / Jurgens Strydom	7^{7} 6^{4}	7; 5

=== Turkey vs. Ghana ===
Turkey
1
Namibia National Tennis Stadium, Windhoek, Namibia
15 May 2004
Hard

Ghana
2

			1	2	3
1	(Turkey) (Ghana)	Haluk Akkoyun; Henry Adjei-Darko	3; 6	0; 6
2	(Turkey) (Ghana)	Ergün Zorlu; Gunther Darkey	1; 6	1; 6
3	(Turkey) (Ghana)	Haluk Akkoyun / Esat Tanık; Samuel Fumi / Solomon Koomsom	6; 2	6; 4

=== Ivory Coast vs. Ghana ===
Ivory Coast
2
Namibia National Tennis Stadium, Windhoek, Namibia
16 May 2004
Hard

Ghana
1

			1	2	3
1	(Ivory Coast) (Ghana)	Nouhoun Sangaré; Solomon Koomsom	7; 5	3; 6	6; 3
2	(Ivory Coast) (Ghana)	Charles Irie; Samuel Fumi	7^{7} 6^{5}	6; 3
3	(Ivory Coast) (Ghana)	Charles Irie / Claude N'Goran; Henry Adjei-Darko / Gunther Darkey	2; 3			retired

=== Turkey vs. Namibia ===
Turkey
3
Namibia National Tennis Stadium, Windhoek, Namibia
16 May 2004
Hard

Namibia
0

			1	2	3
1	(Turkey) (Namibia)	Esat Tanık; Henrico Du Plessis	7; 5	6; 1
2	(Turkey) (Namibia)	Haluk Akkoyun; Jurgens Strydom	6; 2	6; 3
3	(Turkey) (Namibia)	Haluk Akkoyun / Esat Tanık; Henrico Du Plessis / Johan Theron	6; 4	6; 4

== 5th–6th Play-off: Kenya vs. Madagascar ==
Kenya
3
Namibia National Tennis Stadium, Windhoek, Namibia
15 May 2004
Hard

Madagascar
0

			1	2	3
1	(Kenya) (Madagascar)	Christian Vitulli; Donne-Dubert Radison	7^{7} 6^{1}	3; 6	6; 4
2	(Kenya) (Madagascar)	Allan Cooper; Jacob Rasolondrazana	4; 6	6; 3	9; 7
3	(Kenya) (Madagascar)	Allan Cooper / Christian Vitulli; Harivony Andrianafetra / Jean-Marc Randriamanalina	6; 1	6; 4

== Final standings ==
Rank	Team
1	Ivory Coast
2	Ghana
3	Turkey
4	Namibia
5	Kenya
6	Madagascar

- Ivory Coast and Ghana promoted to Group II in 2005.
- Benin and Togo withdrew from the tournament and relegated to Group IV in 2005.

=== Zone B ===
Venue: Orange Tennis Centre, Kaunas, Lithuania (indoor carpet)
Date: 2–8 February

	Pool A	LTU	EST	CYP
1	Lithuania (1–1)		1–2	2–1
2	Estonia (1–1)	2–1		1–2
3	Cyprus (1–1)	1–2	2–1	

	Pool B	MON	MKD	ISL	AND
1	Monaco (3–0)		2–1	2–1	3–0
2	North Macedonia (2–1)	1–2		3–0	2–1
3	Iceland (1–2)	1–2	0–3		3–0
4	Andorra (0–3)	0–3	1–2	0–3	

(scores in italics carried over)

	1st–4th Play-off	MON	EST	MKD	LTU
1	Monaco (2–1)		3–0	2–1	1–2
2	Estonia (2–1)	0–3		2–1	2–1
3	North Macedonia (1–2)	1–2	1–2		2–1
4	Lithuania (1–2)	2–1	1–2	1–2	

	5th–7th Play-off	ISL	CYP	AND
1	Iceland (2–0)		2–1	3–0
2	Cyprus (1–1)	1–2		2–1
3	Andorra (0–2)	0–3	1–2	

- Monaco and Estonia promoted to Group II in 2005.
- Andorra relegated to Group IV in 2005.
- Azerbaijan withdrew from the tournament and relegated to Group IV in 2005.

The Europe/Africa Zone was one of the three zones of the regional Davis Cup competition in 2004.

In the Europe/Africa Zone there were four different tiers, called groups, in which teams competed against each other to advance to the upper tier. Group III was split into two tournaments. One tournament was held in Namibia National Tennis Stadium, Windhoek, Namibia, May 12–16, on outdoor hard courts, while the other was held in Orange Tennis Centre, Kaunas, Lithuania, February 2–8, on indoor carpet courts.

== Format ==
Azerbaijan withdrew from the Kaunas tournament and relegated to the Europe/Africa Zone Group IV in 2005. The seven remaining teams in the Kaunas tournament were split into two pools and played in a round-robin format. The top two teams of each pool advanced to the promotion pool, from which the two top teams were promoted to the Europe/Africa Zone Group II in 2005. The remaining teams in each group from the preliminary round were relegated into the relegation pool, from which the bottom team relegated to the Europe/Africa Zone Group IV in 2005.

== Pool A ==
	Pool A	LTU	EST	CYP
1	Lithuania (1–1)		1–2	2–1
2	Estonia (1–1)	2–1		1–2
3	Cyprus (1–1)	1–2	2–1	

=== Cyprus vs. Lithuania ===
Cyprus
1
Orange Tennis Centre, Kaunas, Lithuania
4 February 2004
Carpet (indoors)

Lithuania
2

			1	2	3
1	(Cyprus) (Lithuania)	Photos Kallias; Rolandas Muraška	1; 6	4; 6
2	(Cyprus) (Lithuania)	Marcos Baghdatis; Aivaras Balžekas	6; 1	4; 6	6; 4
3	(Cyprus) (Lithuania)	Marcos Baghdatis / Demetrios Leontis; Paulius Jurkėnas / Gvidas Sabeckis	3; 6	3; 6

=== Cyprus vs. Estonia ===
Cyprus
2
Orange Tennis Centre, Kaunas, Lithuania
5 February 2004
Carpet (indoors)

Estonia
1

			1	2	3
1	(Cyprus) (Estonia)	Photos Kallias; Alti Vahkal	7; 5	3; 6	4; 6
2	(Cyprus) (Estonia)	Marcos Baghdatis; Mait Künnap	6; 4	7^{7} 6^{3}
3	(Cyprus) (Estonia)	Marcos Baghdatis / Demetrios Leontis; Mait Künnap / Alti Vahkal	5; 7	6; 4	12; 10

=== Estonia vs. Lithuania ===
Estonia
2
Orange Tennis Centre, Kaunas, Lithuania
6 February 2004
Carpet (indoors)

Lithuania
1

			1	2	3
1	(Estonia) (Lithuania)	Oskar Saarne; Rolandas Muraška	6^{3} 7^{7}	6; 4	6; 4
2	(Estonia) (Lithuania)	Mait Künnap; Aivaras Balžekas	5; 7	6; 3	7; 9
3	(Estonia) (Lithuania)	Mait Künnap / Alti Vahkal; Rolandas Muraška / Gvidas Sabeckis	6; 4	6; 3

== Pool B ==
	Pool B	MON	MKD	ISL	AND
1	Monaco (3–0)		2–1	2–1	3–0
2	North Macedonia (2–1)	1–2		3–0	2–1
3	Iceland (1–2)	1–2	0–3		3–0
4	Andorra (0–3)	0–3	1–2	0–3	

=== North Macedonia vs. Iceland ===
North Macedonia
3
Orange Tennis Centre, Kaunas, Lithuania
4 February 2004
Carpet (indoors)

Iceland
0

			1	2	3
1	(North Macedonia) (Iceland)	Predrag Rusevski; Raj-Kumar Bonifacius	6; 4	6; 4
2	(North Macedonia) (Iceland)	Lazar Magdinčev; Arnar Sigurðsson	3; 6	6; 2	6; 3
3	(North Macedonia) (Iceland)	Lazar Magdinčev / Predrag Rusevski; Raj-Kumar Bonifacius / Arnar Sigurðsson	6; 1	7; 5

=== Monaco vs. Andorra ===
Monaco
3
Orange Tennis Centre, Kaunas, Lithuania
4 February 2004
Carpet (indoors)

Andorra
0

			1	2	3
1	(Monaco) (Andorra)	Guillaume Couillard; Kenneth Tuilier-Curco	6; 1	6; 1
2	(Monaco) (Andorra)	Benjamin Balleret; Joan Jiménez Guerra	6; 0	6^{3} 7^{7}	6; 2
3	(Monaco) (Andorra)	Thomas Drouet / Emmanuel Heussner; Pau Gerbaud-Farras / Marc Vilanova	6; 1	6; 4

=== North Macedonia vs. Andorra ===
North Macedonia
2
Orange Tennis Centre, Kaunas, Lithuania
5 February 2004
Carpet (indoors)

Andorra
1

			1	2	3
1	(North Macedonia) (Andorra)	Predrag Rusevski; Kenneth Tuilier-Curco	6; 3	6; 3
2	(North Macedonia) (Andorra)	Lazar Magdinčev; Joan Jiménez Guerra	6; 2	6; 4
3	(North Macedonia) (Andorra)	Dimitar Grabul / Kristian Mitrovski; Pau Gerbaud-Farras / Joan Jiménez Guerra	6^{4} 7^{7}	4; 6

=== Monaco vs. Iceland ===
Monaco
2
Orange Tennis Centre, Kaunas, Lithuania
5 February 2004
Carpet (indoors)

Iceland
1

			1	2	3
1	(Monaco) (Iceland)	Guillaume Couillard; Raj-Kumar Bonifacius	6; 4	6; 2
2	(Monaco) (Iceland)	Benjamin Balleret; Arnar Sigurðsson	6; 3	6; 2
3	(Monaco) (Iceland)	Thomas Drouet / Emmanuel Heussner; Raj-Kumar Bonifacius / Arnar Sigurðsson	5; 7	4; 6

=== North Macedonia vs. Monaco ===
North Macedonia
1
Orange Tennis Centre, Kaunas, Lithuania
6 February 2004
Carpet (indoors)

Monaco
2

			1	2	3
1	(North Macedonia) (Monaco)	Predrag Rusevski; Emmanuel Heussner	3; 6	7^{7} 6^{2}	5; 7
2	(North Macedonia) (Monaco)	Lazar Magdinčev; Benjamin Balleret	6; 4	6^{3} 7^{7}	6; 3
3	(North Macedonia) (Monaco)	Lazar Magdinčev / Predrag Rusevski; Guillaume Couillard / Emmanuel Heussner	6; 4	6^{8} 7^{10}	4; 6

=== Andorra vs. Iceland ===
Andorra
0
Orange Tennis Centre, Kaunas, Lithuania
6 February 2004
Carpet (indoors)

Iceland
3

			1	2	3
1	(Andorra) (Iceland)	Kenneth Tuilier-Curco; Raj-Kumar Bonifacius	2; 6	7; 5	7; 9
2	(Andorra) (Iceland)	Joan Jiménez Guerra; Arnar Sigurðsson	1; 6	2; 6
3	(Andorra) (Iceland)	Pau Gerbaud-Farras / Kenneth Tuilier-Curco; Raj-Kumar Bonifacius / Arnar Sigurðsson	3; 6	4; 6

== Promotion pool ==
The top two teams from each of Pools A and B advanced to the Promotion pool. Results and points from games against the opponent from the preliminary round were carried forward.

(scores in italics carried over from Groups)

	1st–4th Play-off	MON	EST	MKD	LTU
1	Monaco (2–1)		3–0	2–1	1–2
2	Estonia (2–1)	0–3		2–1	2–1
3	North Macedonia (1–2)	1–2	1–2		2–1
4	Lithuania (1–2)	2–1	1–2	1–2	

Monaco and Estonia promoted to Group II in 2005.

=== Monaco vs. Lithuania ===
Monaco
1
Orange Tennis Centre, Kaunas, Lithuania
7 February 2004
Carpet (indoors)

Lithuania
2

			1	2	3
1	(Monaco) (Lithuania)	Guillaume Couillard; Gvidas Sabeckis	4; 6	6; 3	5; 7
2	(Monaco) (Lithuania)	Benjamin Balleret; Aivaras Balžekas	4; 6	6^{5} 7^{7}
3	(Monaco) (Lithuania)	Guillaume Couillard / Emmanuel Heussner; Paulius Jurkėnas / Gvidas Sabeckis	2; 6	7; 5	14; 12

=== Estonia vs. North Macedonia ===
Estonia
2
Orange Tennis Centre, Kaunas, Lithuania
7 February 2004
Carpet (indoors)

North Macedonia
1

			1	2	3
1	(Estonia) (North Macedonia)	Oskar Saarne; Predrag Rusevski	6^{6} 7^{8}	4; 6
2	(Estonia) (North Macedonia)	Mait Künnap; Lazar Magdinčev	2; 6	6; 4	6; 2
3	(Estonia) (North Macedonia)	Mait Künnap / Alti Vahkal; Lazar Magdinčev / Predrag Rusevski	6; 4	6^{7} 7^{9}	7; 5

=== Monaco vs. Estonia ===
Monaco
3
Orange Tennis Centre, Kaunas, Lithuania
8 February 2004
Carpet (indoors)

Estonia
0

			1	2	3
1	(Monaco) (Estonia)	Emmanuel Heussner; Oskar Saarne	6^{8} 7^{10}	7; 5	13; 11
2	(Monaco) (Estonia)	Guillaume Couillard; Mait Künnap	6; 3	7^{7} 6^{3}
3	(Monaco) (Estonia)	Benjamin Balleret / Thomas Drouet; Mait Künnap / Alti Vahkal	6^{1} 7^{7}	7^{7} 6^{4}	1; 0	retired

=== North Macedonia vs. Lithuania ===
North Macedonia
2
Orange Tennis Centre, Kaunas, Lithuania
8 February 2004
Carpet (indoors)

Lithuania
1

			1	2	3
1	(North Macedonia) (Lithuania)	Predrag Rusevski; Rolandas Muraška	4; 6	2; 6
2	(North Macedonia) (Lithuania)	Lazar Magdinčev; Aivaras Balžekas	6; 4	7^{7} 6^{3}
3	(North Macedonia) (Lithuania)	Lazar Magdinčev / Predrag Rusevski; Paulius Jurkėnas / Rolandas Muraška	4; 6	7; 5	10; 8

== Relegation pool ==
The bottom team from Pool A and the bottom two teams from Pool B were placed in the relegation group. Results and points from games against the opponent from the preliminary round were carried forward.

(scores in italics carried over from Groups)

	5th–7th Play-off	ISL	CYP	AND
1	Iceland (2–0)		2–1	3–0
2	Cyprus (1–1)	1–2		2–1
3	Andorra (0–2)	0–3	1–2	

Andorra relegated to Group IV in 2005.

=== Andorra vs. Cyprus ===
Andorra
1
Orange Tennis Centre, Kaunas, Lithuania
7 February 2004
Carpet (indoors)

Cyprus
2

			1	2	3
1	(Andorra) (Cyprus)	Pau Gerbaud-Farras; Photos Kallias	7^{8} 6^{6}	6; 3
2	(Andorra) (Cyprus)	Kenneth Tuilier-Curco; Marcos Baghdatis	2; 6	0; 6
3	(Andorra) (Cyprus)	Pau Gerbaud-Farras / Joan Jiménez Guerra; Marcos Baghdatis / Demetrios Leontis	7^{7} 6^{5}	6^{1} 7^{7}	2; 6

=== Iceland vs. Cyprus ===
Iceland
2
Orange Tennis Centre, Kaunas, Lithuania
8 February 2004
Carpet (indoors)

Cyprus
1

			1	2	3
1	(Iceland) (Cyprus)	Andri Jonsson; Demetrios Leontis	3; 6	4; 6
2	(Iceland) (Cyprus)	Arnar Sigurðsson; Eleftherios Christou	6; 2	6; 2
3	(Iceland) (Cyprus)	Jón Axel Jónsson / Arnar Sigurðsson; Eleftherios Christou / Demetrios Leontis	6; 3	6; 4

== Final standings ==
Rank	Team
1	Monaco
2	Estonia
3	North Macedonia
4	Lithuania
5	Iceland
6	Cyprus
7	Andorra

- Monaco and Estonia promoted to Group II in 2005.
- Andorra relegated to Group IV in 2005.
- Azerbaijan withdrew from the tournament and relegated to Group IV in 2005.

=== Group IV ===
==== Zone A ====
- Venue: Olympique Club de Dakar, Dakar, Senegal (hard)
- Date: 4–8 February

		NGR	SMR	SEN	MLI	GAB
1	Nigeria (4–0)		3–0	3–0	3–0	3–0
2	San Marino (3–1)	0–3		3–0	3–0	3–0
3	Senegal (2–2)	0–3	0–3		2–1	3–0
4	Mali (1–3)	0–3	0–3	1–2		3–0
5	Gabon (0–4)	0–3	0–3	0–3	0–3	

- Nigeria and San Marino promoted to Group III in 2005.

==== Zone B ====
Venue: Tennis Club Ali-Ten, Chișinău, Moldova (clay)
Date: 15–18 July

	Pool A	ARM	MRI	BOT	MLT
1	Armenia (3–0)		3–0	3–0	3–0
2	Mauritius (2–1)	0–3		2–1	3–0
3	Botswana (1–2)	0–3	1–2		2–1
4	Malta (0–3)	0–3	0–3	1–2	

	Pool B	BIH	MDA	RWA	UGA
1	Bosnia and Herzegovina (3–0)		2–1	3–0	3–0
2	Moldova (2–1)	1–2		3–0	3–0
3	Rwanda (1–2)	0–3	0–3		3–0
4	Uganda (0–3)	0–3	0–3	0–3	

(scores in italics carried over)

	1st–4th Play-off	BIH	ARM	MDA	MRI
1	Bosnia and Herzegovina (3–0)		3–0	2–1	3–0
2	Armenia (2–1)	0–3		2–1	3–0
3	Moldova (1–2)	1–2	1–2		3–0
4	Mauritius (0–3)	0–3	0–3	0–3	

	5th–8th Play-off	RWA	BOT	UGA	MLT
1	Rwanda (3–0)		2–1	3–0	2–1
2	Botswana (2–1)	1–2		3–0	2–1
3	Uganda (1–2)	0–3	0–3		3–0
4	Malta (0–3)	1–2	1–2	0–3	

- Bosnia and Herzegovina and Armenia promoted to Group III in 2005.

The Europe/Africa Zone was one of the three zones of the regional Davis Cup competition in 2004.

In the Europe/Africa Zone there were four different tiers, called groups, in which teams competed against each other to advance to the upper tier. Group IV was split into two tournaments. One tournament was held in Olympique Club de Dakar, Dakar, Senegal, February 4–8, on outdoor hard courts, while the other was held in Tennis Club Ali-Ten, Chișinău, Moldova, July 15–18, on outdoor clay courts.

== Format ==
The eight teams in the Chișinău tournament were split into two groups and played in a round-robin format. The top two teams of each group advanced to the promotion pool, from which the two top teams were promoted to the Europe/Africa Zone Group III in 2005. The bottom two teams of each group were placed in a second pool to determine places 5–8.

== Pool A ==
	Pool A	ARM	MRI	BOT	MLT
1	Armenia (3–0)		3–0	3–0	3–0
2	Mauritius (2–1)	0–3		2–1	3–0
3	Botswana (1–2)	0–3	1–2		2–1
4	Malta (0–3)	0–3	0–3	1–2	

=== Armenia vs. Mauritius ===
Armenia
3
Tennis Club Ali-Ten, Chișinău, Moldova
15 July 2004
Clay

Mauritius
0

			1	2	3
1	(Armenia) (Mauritius)	Harutyun Sofyan; Olivier Rey	6; 1	6; 1
2	(Armenia) (Mauritius)	Sargis Sargsian; Kamil Patel	6; 4	6; 4
3	(Armenia) (Mauritius)	Tsolak Gevorgyan / Ara Harutyunyan; Alexandre Daruty / Simon Koenig	6; 4	1; 6	6; 3

=== Botswana vs. Malta ===
Botswana
2
Tennis Club Ali-Ten, Chișinău, Moldova
15 July 2004
Clay

Malta
1

			1	2	3
1	(Botswana) (Malta)	Bokang Setshogo; Marcus Delicata	6; 2	6; 1
2	(Botswana) (Malta)	Phenyo Matong; Daniel Ceross	6; 4	6; 4
3	(Botswana) (Malta)	Uyapo Nleya / Keneilwe Phuthego; Daniel Ceross / Marcus Delicata	6^{5} 7^{7}	0; 6

=== Armenia vs. Malta ===
Armenia
3
Tennis Club Ali-Ten, Chișinău, Moldova
16 July 2004
Clay

Malta
0

			1	2	3
1	(Armenia) (Malta)	Ara Harutyunyan; Marcus Delicata	6; 1	6; 2
2	(Armenia) (Malta)	Sargis Sargsian; Daniel Ceross	6; 1	6; 1
3	(Armenia) (Malta)	Ara Harutyunyan / Harutyun Sofyan; Matthew Borg / Daniel Ceross	6; 1	6; 1

=== Botswana vs. Mauritius ===
Botswana
1
Tennis Club Ali-Ten, Chișinău, Moldova
16 July 2004
Clay

Mauritius
2

			1	2	3
1	(Botswana) (Mauritius)	Bokang Setshogo; Simon Koenig	6; 1	6; 3
2	(Botswana) (Mauritius)	Phenyo Matong; Kamil Patel	3; 6	2; 6
3	(Botswana) (Mauritius)	Phenyo Matong / Uyapo Nleya; Alexandre Daruty / Kamil Patel	1; 6	0; 6

=== Armenia vs. Botswana ===
Armenia
3
Tennis Club Ali-Ten, Chișinău, Moldova
16 July 2004
Clay

Botswana
0

			1	2	3
1	(Armenia) (Botswana)	Harutyun Sofyan; Keneilwe Phuthego	6; 3	6; 2
2	(Armenia) (Botswana)	Sargis Sargsian; Uyapo Nleya	6; 0	6; 1
3	(Armenia) (Botswana)	Sargis Sargsian / Harutyun Sofyan; Uyapo Nleya / Bokang Setshogo	6; 0	6; 1

=== Malta vs. Mauritius ===
Malta
0
Tennis Club Ali-Ten, Chișinău, Moldova
16 July 2004
Clay

Mauritius
3

			1	2	3
1	(Malta) (Mauritius)	Marcus Delicata; Alexandre Daruty	0; 6	0; 6
2	(Malta) (Mauritius)	Daniel Ceross; Kamil Patel	1; 6	2; 6
3	(Malta) (Mauritius)	Matthew Borg / Daniel Ceross; Alexandre Daruty / Simon Koenig	3; 6	7^{7} 6^{5}	2; 6

== Pool B ==
	Pool B	BIH	MDA	RWA	UGA
1	Bosnia and Herzegovina (3–0)		2–1	3–0	3–0
2	Moldova (2–1)	1–2		3–0	3–0
3	Rwanda (1–2)	0–3	0–3		3–0
4	Uganda (0–3)	0–3	0–3	0–3	

=== Moldova vs. Uganda ===
Moldova
3
Tennis Club Ali-Ten, Chișinău, Moldova
15 July 2004
Clay

Uganda
0

			1	2	3
1	(Moldova) (Uganda)	Andrei Ciumac; Godfrey Uzunga	6; 0	6; 3
2	(Moldova) (Uganda)	Andrei Gorban; Charles Yokwe	6; 0	6; 0
3	(Moldova) (Uganda)	Andrei Gorban / Denys Molchanov; Patrick Olobo / Charles Yokwe	6; 2	6; 1

=== Bosnia and Herzegovina vs. Rwanda ===
Bosnia and Herzegovina
3
Tennis Club Ali-Ten, Chișinău, Moldova
15 July 2004
Clay

Rwanda
0

			1	2	3
1	(Bosnia and Herzegovina) (Rwanda)	Bojan Vujić; Jean-Paul Nshimiyimana	6; 1	6; 1
2	(Bosnia and Herzegovina) (Rwanda)	Aleksandar Marić; Jean-Claude Gasigwa	6; 3	6; 3
3	(Bosnia and Herzegovina) (Rwanda)	Aleksandar Marić / Bojan Vujić; Jean-Claude Gasigwa / Eric Hagenimana	6; 4	6; 2

=== Moldova vs. Rwanda ===
Moldova
3
Tennis Club Ali-Ten, Chișinău, Moldova
16 July 2004
Clay

Rwanda
0

			1	2	3
1	(Moldova) (Rwanda)	Andrei Ciumac; Eric Hagenimana	3; 6	6; 4	6; 4
2	(Moldova) (Rwanda)	Andrei Gorban; Jean-Claude Gasigwa	6; 0	6; 0
3	(Moldova) (Rwanda)	Ilie Babinciuc / Andrei Ciumac; Eric Hagenimana / Jean-Paul Nshimiyimana	6; 0	6; 3

=== Bosnia and Herzegovina vs. Uganda ===
Bosnia and Herzegovina
3
Tennis Club Ali-Ten, Chișinău, Moldova
16 July 2004
Clay

Uganda
0

			1	2	3
1	(Bosnia and Herzegovina) (Uganda)	Bojan Vujić; Godfrey Uzunga	6; 1	6; 1
2	(Bosnia and Herzegovina) (Uganda)	Uglješa Ostojić; Charles Yokwe	6; 0	6; 1
3	(Bosnia and Herzegovina) (Uganda)	Aleksandar Marić / Bojan Vujić; Patrick Olobo / Godfrey Uzunga	6; 1	6; 2

=== Moldova vs. Bosnia and Herzegovina ===
Moldova
1
Tennis Club Ali-Ten, Chișinău, Moldova
16 July 2004
Clay

Bosnia and Herzegovina
2

			1	2	3
1	(Moldova) (Bosnia and Herzegovina)	Denys Molchanov; Bojan Vujić	6; 3	0; 2		retired
2	(Moldova) (Bosnia and Herzegovina)	Andrei Gorban; Uglješa Ostojić	6; 1	6; 4
3	(Moldova) (Bosnia and Herzegovina)	Andrei Ciumac / Andrei Gorban; Aleksandar Marić / Bojan Vujić	6^{5} 7^{7}	6; 3	2; 6

=== Rwanda vs. Uganda ===
Rwanda
3
Tennis Club Ali-Ten, Chișinău, Moldova
16 July 2004
Clay

Uganda
0

			1	2	3
1	(Rwanda) (Uganda)	Alain Hakizimana; Patrick Olobo	6; 1	6; 4
2	(Rwanda) (Uganda)	Eric Hagenimana; Godfrey Uzunga	3; 6	6; 3	6; 2
3	(Rwanda) (Uganda)	Jean-Claude Gasigwa / Alain Hakizimana; James Odongo / Patrick Olobo	6; 3	6; 3

== Promotion pool ==
The top two teams from each of Pools A and B advanced to the Promotion pool. Results and points from games against the opponent from the preliminary round were carried forward.

(scores in italics carried over from Groups)

	1st–4th Play-off	BIH	ARM	MDA	MRI
1	Bosnia and Herzegovina (3–0)		3–0	2–1	3–0
2	Armenia (2–1)	0–3		2–1	3–0
3	Moldova (1–2)	1–2	1–2		3–0
4	Mauritius (0–3)	0–3	0–3	0–3	

Bosnia and Herzegovina and Armenia promoted to Group III in 2005.

=== Armenia vs. Moldova ===
Armenia
2
Tennis Club Ali-Ten, Chișinău, Moldova
17 July 2004
Clay

Moldova
1

			1	2	3
1	(Armenia) (Moldova)	Harutyun Sofyan; Andrei Ciumac	4; 6	6^{3} 7^{7}
2	(Armenia) (Moldova)	Sargis Sargsian; Andrei Gorban	6; 4	6; 2
3	(Armenia) (Moldova)	Sargis Sargsian / Harutyun Sofyan; Andrei Ciumac / Andrei Gorban	6; 3	6; 3

=== Mauritius vs. Bosnia and Herzegovina ===
Mauritius
0
Tennis Club Ali-Ten, Chișinău, Moldova
17 July 2004
Clay

Bosnia and Herzegovina
3

			1	2	3
1	(Mauritius) (Bosnia and Herzegovina)	Alexandre Daruty; Bojan Vujić	1; 6	0; 6
2	(Mauritius) (Bosnia and Herzegovina)	Kamil Patel; Uglješa Ostojić	4; 6	3; 6
3	(Mauritius) (Bosnia and Herzegovina)	Alexandre Daruty / Simon Koenig; Aleksandar Marić / Bojan Vujić	1; 6	1; 6

=== Armenia vs. Bosnia and Herzegovina ===
Armenia
0
Tennis Club Ali-Ten, Chișinău, Moldova
18 July 2004
Clay

Bosnia and Herzegovina
3

			1	2	3
1	(Armenia) (Bosnia and Herzegovina)	Ara Harutyunyan; Aleksandar Marić	0; 6	1; 6
2	(Armenia) (Bosnia and Herzegovina)	Harutyun Sofyan; Uglješa Ostojić	2; 6	1; 6
3	(Armenia) (Bosnia and Herzegovina)	Ara Harutyunyan / Harutyun Sofyan; Aleksandar Marić / Uglješa Ostojić	1; 6	0; 6

=== Mauritius vs. Moldova ===
Mauritius
0
Tennis Club Ali-Ten, Chișinău, Moldova
18 July 2004
Clay

Moldova
3

			1	2	3
1	(Mauritius) (Moldova)	Alexandre Daruty; Ilie Babinciuc	0; 6	0; 6
2	(Mauritius) (Moldova)	Kamil Patel; Andrei Ciumac	6; 2	3; 6	2; 6
3	(Mauritius) (Moldova)	Simon Koenig / Olivier Rey; Ilie Babinciuc / Andrei Ciumac	3; 6	1; 6

== Placement pool ==
The bottom two teams from Pools A and B were placed in the placement group. Results and points from games against the opponent from the preliminary round were carried forward.

(scores in italics carried over from Groups)

	5th–8th Play-off	RWA	BOT	UGA	MLT
1	Rwanda (3–0)		2–1	3–0	2–1
2	Botswana (2–1)	1–2		3–0	2–1
3	Uganda (1–2)	0–3	0–3		3–0
4	Malta (0–3)	1–2	1–2	0–3	

=== Botswana vs. Rwanda ===
Botswana
1
Tennis Club Ali-Ten, Chișinău, Moldova
17 July 2004
Clay

Rwanda
2

			1	2	3
1	(Botswana) (Rwanda)	Bokang Setshogo; Eric Hagenimana	6; 3	3; 6	2; 6
2	(Botswana) (Rwanda)	Phenyo Matong; Jean-Claude Gasigwa	6; 4	6; 2
3	(Botswana) (Rwanda)	Keneilwe Phuthego / Bokang Setshogo; Eric Hagenimana / Alain Hakizimana	3; 6	6; 2	1; 6

=== Malta vs. Uganda ===
Malta
0
Tennis Club Ali-Ten, Chișinău, Moldova
17 July 2004
Clay

Uganda
3

			1	2	3
1	(Malta) (Uganda)	Matthew Borg; James Odongo	1; 6	2; 6
2	(Malta) (Uganda)	Daniel Ceross; Patrick Olobo	2; 6	1; 6
3	(Malta) (Uganda)	Matthew Borg / Daniel Ceross; Patrick Olobo / Charles Yokwe	2; 6	2; 6

=== Botswana vs. Uganda ===
Botswana
3
Tennis Club Ali-Ten, Chișinău, Moldova
18 July 2004
Clay

Uganda
0

			1	2	3
1	(Botswana) (Uganda)	Bokang Setshogo; James Odongo	7; 5	6; 3
2	(Botswana) (Uganda)	Phenyo Matong; Patrick Olobo	6; 2	6; 3
3	(Botswana) (Uganda)	Phenyo Matong / Bokang Setshogo; Patrick Olobo / Charles Yokwe	7^{7} 6^{5}	0; 6	6; 3

=== Malta vs. Rwanda ===
Malta
1
Tennis Club Ali-Ten, Chișinău, Moldova
18 July 2004
Clay

Rwanda
2

			1	2	3
1	(Malta) (Rwanda)	Marcus Delicata; Eric Hagenimana	3; 6	6; 3	4; 6
2	(Malta) (Rwanda)	Daniel Ceross; Jean-Claude Gasigwa	3; 6	2; 6
3	(Malta) (Rwanda)	Daniel Ceross / Marcus Delicata; Alain Hakizimana / Jean-Paul Nshimiyimana	7; 5	6; 4

== Final standings ==
Rank	Team
1	Bosnia and Herzegovina
2	Armenia
3	Moldova
4	Mauritius
5	Rwanda
6	Botswana
7	Uganda
8	Malta

- Bosnia and Herzegovina and Armenia promoted to Group III in 2005.
