= 2009 Delray Beach International Tennis Championships =

- Date: February 23 – March 1
- Edition: 17th
- Category: International Series
- Draw: 32S / 16D
- Prize money: $442,500
- Surface: Hard / outdoor
- Location: Delray Beach, Florida, U.S.

Champions

Singles
- (United States) Mardy Fish

Doubles
- (United States) Bob Bryan / (United States) Mike Bryan
← 2008 ·	Delray Beach Open	· 2010 →

The 2009 Delray Beach International Tennis Championships was a men's tennis tournament played on outdoor hard courts. It was the 17th edition of the Delray Beach International Tennis Championships, and was part of the International Series of the 2009 ATP Tour. It took place at the Delray Beach Tennis Center in Delray Beach, Florida, United States, from February 23 through March 1, 2009.

The field was headlined by ATP No. 21 and San Jose finalist Mardy Fish, Auckland finalist Sam Querrey, and 2008 Moscow titlist Igor Kunitsyn. Other top seeds competing were Ernests Gulbis, Steve Darcis, Florent Serra, Jérémy Chardy and Lu Yen-hsun.

First-seeded Mardy Fish won the singles title.

== ATP entrants ==
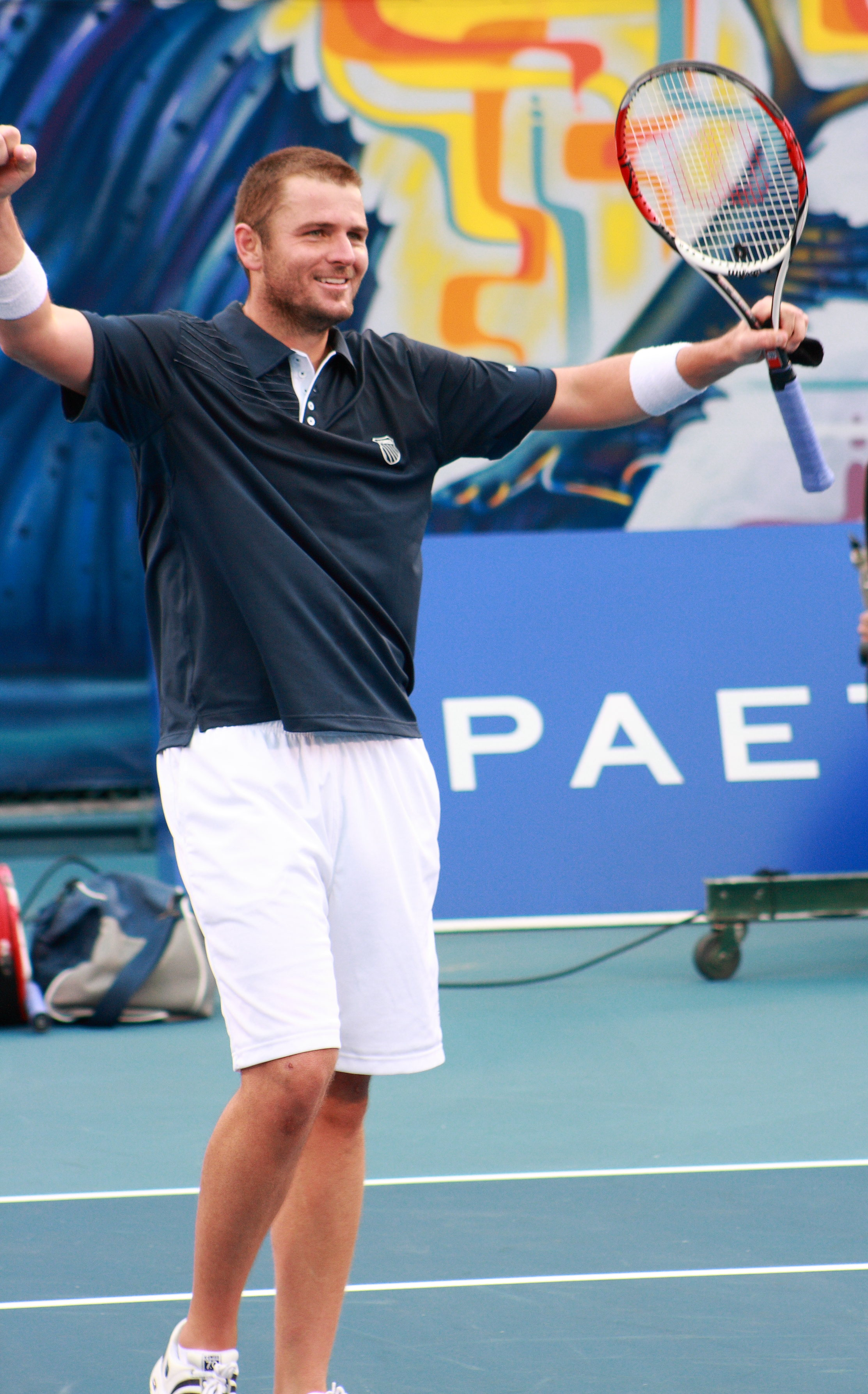
Mardy Fish won the singles event

=== Seeds ===
Athlete	Nationality	Ranking*	Seeding
Mardy Fish	United States	20	1
Sam Querrey	United States	34	2
Ernests Gulbis	Latvia	42	3
Igor Kunitsyn	Russia	40	4
Steve Darcis	Belgium	49	5
Florent Serra	France	51	6
Jérémy Chardy	France	52	7
Lu Yen-hsun	Chinese Taipei	59	8

- Rankings as of February 23, 2009.

=== Other entrants ===
The following players received wildcards into the main draw:

- (United States) Sam Querrey
- (Australia) Lleyton Hewitt
- (United States) Evan King

The following players received a special exempt into the main draw:

- (Israel) Dudi Sela

The following players received entry from the qualifying draw:

- (Russia) Evgeny Korolev
- (Canada) Frank Dancevic
- (United States) Taylor Dent
- (United States) Ryan Sweeting

== Finals ==
=== Singles ===
(United States) Mardy Fish defeated (Russia) Evgeny Korolev 7–5, 6–3

- It was Fish's first singles title of the year and 3rd of his career.

=== Doubles ===
(United States) Bob Bryan / (United States) Mike Bryan defeated (Brazil) Marcelo Melo / (Brazil) André Sá, 6–4, 6–4
