= 2010 Delray Beach International Tennis Championships – Singles =

Singles
- 2010 Delray Beach International Tennis Championships

Final
- Champion: (Latvia) Ernests Gulbis
- Runner-up: (Croatia) Ivo Karlović
- Score: 6–2, 6–3

Details
- Draw: 32
- Seeds: 8

Events
Singles	Doubles
- Delray Beach Open

The 2010 Delray Beach International Tennis Championships was a tennis tournament played on outdoor hard courts. It was the 18th edition of the Delray Beach International Tennis Championships, and was part of the International Series of the 2010 ATP World Tour. It took place at the Delray Beach Tennis Center in Delray Beach, Florida, United States, from February 22 through February 28, 2010. Mardy Fish was the defending champion, but he lost 2–6, 3–6 to Ivo Karlović in the semifinals.

Ernests Gulbis won in the final 6–2, 6–3 against Ivo Karlović.

== Seeds ==
1. (Germany) Tommy Haas (first round)
2. (Croatia) Ivo Karlović (final)
3. (Germany) Benjamin Becker (quarterfinals)
4. (France) Jérémy Chardy (quarterfinals)
5. (Kazakhstan) Evgeny Korolev (second round)
6. (Germany) Florian Mayer (second round)
7. (United States) James Blake (quarterfinals)
8. (United States) Michael Russell (first round)

== Draw ==
Key

- Q = Qualifier
- WC = Wild card
- LL = Lucky loser
- Alt = Alternate
- ITF = ITF entry
- PR = Protected ranking
- SR = Special ranking
- SE = Special exempt
- JE = Junior exempt
- JR = Junior Accelerator Programme entrant
- CO = College Accelerator Programme entrant
- NG = Next Gen Accelerator Program entrant
- w/o = Walkover
- r = Retired
- d = Defaulted

=== Finals ===
Semifinals
(Latvia) Ernests Gulbis	6	6
(Finland) Jarkko Nieminen	4	4
(United States) Mardy Fish	2	3
2	(Croatia) Ivo Karlović	6	6

Final
(Latvia) Ernests Gulbis	6	6
2	(Croatia) Ivo Karlović	2	3

=== Top half ===
First round
1/WC	(Germany) T Haas	6^{3}	5
(Russia) T Gabashvili	7^{7}	7
Q	(United States) R Harrison	4	6^{5}
(Latvia) E Gulbis	6	7^{7}
Q	(South Africa) K Anderson	6^{7}	6^{2}
(Argentina) L Mayer	7^{9}	7^{7}
Q	(Australia) N Lindahl	4	1
6	(Germany) F Mayer	6	6
3	(Germany) B Becker	6	1	6
(Japan) K Nishikori	3	6	0
(United States) R Ram	3	2
(United States) W Odesnik	6	6
(Italy) P Lorenzi	3	4
(Finland) J Nieminen	6	6
(Ecuador) N Lapentti	2	6	1
5	(Kazakhstan) E Korolev	6	1	6

Second round
(Russia) T Gabashvili	1	4
(Latvia) E Gulbis	6	6
(Argentina) L Mayer	6	7^{7}
6	(Germany) F Mayer	4	6^{4}
3	(Germany) B Becker	w/o
(United States) W Odesnik
(Finland) J Nieminen	5	6	6
5	(Kazakhstan) E Korolev	7	1	0

Quarterfinals
(Latvia) E Gulbis	7^{7}	6
(Argentina) L Mayer	6^{2}	4
3	(Germany) B Becker	5	6	6^{5}
(Finland) J Nieminen	7	3	7^{7}

Semifinals
(Latvia) E Gulbis	6	6
(Finland) J Nieminen	4	4

=== Bottom half ===
First round
8	(United States) M Russell	4	6	5
(Germany) M Zverev	6	3	7
(Belgium) C Rochus	7	3	3^{r}
(United States) M Fish	5	6	3
WC	(United States) V Spadea	2	3
(Colombia) S Giraldo	6	6
(Belgium) X Malisse	3	6^{5}
4	(France) J Chardy	6	7^{7}
7	(United States) J Blake	6	3	6
(United States) T Dent	1	6	3
Q	(United States) R Kendrick	6^{4}	6^{0}
(Netherlands) R Haase	7^{7}	7^{7}
WC	(France) S Grosjean	6	3	2
(Germany) D Brands	3	6	6
(Germany) P Petzschner	3	6^{3}
2	(Croatia) I Karlović	6	7^{7}

Second round
(Germany) M Zverev	2	4
(United States) M Fish	6	6
(Colombia) S Giraldo	5	6	5
4	(France) J Chardy	7	4	7
7	(United States) J Blake	6	6
(Netherlands) R Haase	3	1
(Germany) D Brands	6^{8}	6^{6}
2	(Croatia) I Karlović	7^{10}	7^{8}

Quarterfinals
(United States) M Fish	6	6
4	(France) J Chardy	4	3
7	(United States) J Blake	3	7^{7}	1
2	(Croatia) I Karlović	6	6^{5}	6

Semifinals
(United States) M Fish	2	3
2	(Croatia) I Karlović	6	6

== Qualifying ==
=== Seeds ===
1. (United States) Kevin Kim (second round)
2. (Australia) Carsten Ball (second round)
3. (South Africa) Kevin Anderson (qualified)
4. (United States) Robert Kendrick (qualified)
5. (Chile) Paul Capdeville (second round)
6. (United States) Donald Young (first round)
7. (United States) Jesse Witten (first round)
8. (Colombia) Carlos Salamanca (qualifying competition)

=== Qualifiers ===
1. (Australia) Nick Lindahl
2. (United States) Ryan Harrison
3. (South Africa) Kevin Anderson
4. (United States) Robert Kendrick

=== Draw ===
==== First qualifier ====
First round
1	(United States) Kevin Kim	6	6
(South Africa) Rik de Voest	4	4
WC	(France) Julien Carsuzaa	5	2
(Chinese Taipei) Yang Tsung-hua	7	6
(Australia) Nick Lindahl	6	6
(Australia) Marinko Matosevic	2	1
(Canada) Peter Polansky	3	4
5	(Chile) Paul Capdeville	6	6

Second round
1	(United States) Kevin Kim	4	4
(Chinese Taipei) Yang Tsung-hua	6	6
(Australia) Nick Lindahl	6	6
5	(Chile) Paul Capdeville	3	3

Qualifying competition
(Chinese Taipei) Yang Tsung-hua	6	2	3
(Australia) Nick Lindahl	4	6	6

==== Second qualifier ====
First round
2	(Australia) Carsten Ball	7	6
(United States) Ryler DeHeart	5	3
(United States) Ryan Harrison	7	7
(Slovakia) Luka Gregorc	5	5
(India) Yuki Bhambri	6	6
(Uruguay) Marcel Felder	4	3
(South Africa) Izak van der Merwe	2	6	6
6	(United States) Donald Young	6	3	3

Second round
2	(Australia) Carsten Ball	6	6^{5}	3
(United States) Ryan Harrison	2	7^{7}	6
(India) Yuki Bhambri	6	4	5
(South Africa) Izak van der Merwe	4	6	7

Qualifying competition
(United States) Ryan Harrison	6	5	7^{7}
(South Africa) Izak van der Merwe	4	7	6^{2}

==== Third qualifier ====
First round
3	(South Africa) Kevin Anderson	6
(Ecuador) Giovanni Lapentti	1^{r}
WC	(United States) Jack Sock	6^{4}	5
WC	(United States) Olivier Sajous	7^{7}	7
(Colombia) Alejandro González	2	3
(Canada) Pierre-Ludovic Duclos	6	6
(Lithuania) Ričardas Berankis	7	6^{4}	1^{r}
8	(Colombia) Carlos Salamanca	5	7^{7}	4

Second round
3	(South Africa) Kevin Anderson	6	7^{9}
WC	(United States) Olivier Sajous	3	6^{7}
(Canada) Pierre-Ludovic Duclos	6	4	5
8	(Colombia) Carlos Salamanca	4	6	7

Qualifying competition
3	(South Africa) Kevin Anderson	6	6
8	(Colombia) Carlos Salamanca	4	4

==== Fourth qualifier ====
First round
4	(United States) Robert Kendrick	5	6	6
(United States) Michael McClune	7	3	4
(Russia) Alex Bogomolov Jr.	7	6^{1}	6^{6}
(United States) Tim Smyczek	5	7^{7}	7^{8}
WC	(United States) Eric Hechtman	1	2
(United Kingdom) Jamie Baker	6	6
(France) Vincent Millot	6	3	6
7	(United States) Jesse Witten	4	6	3

Second round
4	(United States) Robert Kendrick	6	6
(United States) Tim Smyczek	4	2
(United Kingdom) Jamie Baker	2	6	7^{7}
(France) Vincent Millot	6	3	6^{3}

Qualifying competition
4	(United States) Robert Kendrick	3	7^{7}	6
(United Kingdom) Jamie Baker	6	6^{2}	2
