= Italy Davis Cup team all-time record =

The following table shows the Italy Davis Cup team all-time record against opposing nations in the Davis Cup. It does not include matches in the World Team Cup or ATP Cup.

In total, Italy has played against 48 different nations and has a winning record against 36 nations.

As of 7 July 2024, Italy has a perfect 100% winning record against 19 nations. The best of these is against Poland, achieving 100% of wins after 9 ties. Italy has not won a tie against three nations. The worst of these is against Canada, as they have been unable to record a win after four ties.

== Head-to-head record ==
=== Key ===
100% winning record Winning record Even record Losing record 100% losing record

As of 7 July 2024

Nation	Ties	W–L	%	Surface				Setting		Unknown	Ref
Nation	Ties	W–L	%	Clay	Hard	Grass	Crpt	Ind'r	Out'r	Unknown	Ref
Argentina	5	3–2	60%	2–2	1–0	—	—	1–0	2–2	—	
Australia^{1}	13	5–8	38%	4–1	1–0	0–7	—	1–0	4–8	— (Note: Unknown record changed to Hard (indoor) for the 2023 Finals ties held in Malaga.)	
Austria	6	5–1	83%	4–0	—	—	—	0–1	4–0	1–0	
Belarus	1	1–0	100%	1–0	—	—	—	—	1–0	—	
Belgium	9	5–4	56%	3–1	0–1	—	—	0–1	3–1	2–2	
Brazil	4	2–2	50%	1–2	—	—	1–0	1–0	1–2	—	
Bulgaria	3	3–0	100%	3–0	—	—	—	0–0	3–0	—	
Canada	4	0–4	0%	—	0–4	—	—	0–4	—	—	
Chile	7	7–0	100%	5–0	2–0	—	—	1–0	6–0	—	
Colombia	1	1–0	100%	—	1–0	—	—	1–0	—	— (Note: Unknown record changed to Hard (indoor) for the 2021 ties held in Turin.)	
Croatia	5	2–3	40%	1–1	1–2	—	—	2–2	0–1	—	
Czech Republic^{2}	11	3–8	27%	3–5	0–1	—	0–1	0–2	3–5	0–1	
Denmark	10	8–2	80%	7–1	—	—	1–0	1–0	7–1	0–1	
Egypt	4	4–0	100%	4–0	—	—	—	—	4–0	—	
Finland	3	2–1	67%	1–1	—	—	1–0	1–0	1–1	—	
France	11	5–6	45%	5–5	—	—	0–1	0–1	5–5	—	
Georgia	1	1–0	100%	1–0	—	—	—	—	1–0	—	
Germany^{3}	8	2–6	25%	1–2	—	—	0–1	0–1	1–2	1–3	
Great Britain^{4}	16	12–4	75%	6–1	—	5–2	1–1	1–1	11–3	—	
Hungary	8	7–1	88%	4–0	—	—	—	—	4–0	3–1	
India	6	5–1	83%	3–0	0–0	2–1	—	—	5–1	—	
Ireland	3	3–0	100%	1–0	—	2–0	—	—	3–0	—	
Israel	2	1–1	50%	1–0	0–1	—	—	—	1–1	—	
Japan (Note: Does not include ties where walkover occurred: 1922 First Round victory against Japan; 1924 Second Round victory against Romania; 1948 Europe First Round victory against Poland; 1949 Europe First Round victory against Turkiye; 1966 Europe Quarterfinal victory against Morocco)	3	3–0	100%	2–0	1–0	—	—	1–0	2–0	—	
Kazakhstan	1	0–1	0%	—	0–1	—	—	0–1	—	—	
Latvia	1	1–0	100%	1–0	—	—	—	—	1–0	—	
Luxembourg	5	5–0	100%	2–0	2–0	—	—	1–0	3–0	1–0	
Mexico	1	1–0	100%	1–0	—	—	—	—	1–0	—	
Monaco	3	3–0	100%	3–0	—	—	—	—	3–0	—	
Morocco	2	1–1	50%	1–1	—	—	—	—	1–1	—	
Netherlands	9	8–1	89%	6–1	2–0	—	—	2–0	6–1	—	
New Zealand	1	0–1	0%	0–1	—	—	—	—	0–1	—	
Paraguay	1	1–0	100%	1–0	—	—	—	—	1–0	—	
Philippines	1	1–0	100%	—	—	1–0	—	—	1–0	—	
Poland	9	9–0	100%	5–0	—	—	—	—	5–0	4–0	
Portugal	3	3–0	100%	2–0	—	—	1–0	1–0	2–0	—	
Romania	4	3–1	75%	3–1	—	—	—	—	3–1	—	
Russia^{5}	6	5–1	83%	4–0	1–0	—	—	1–0	4–0	0–1	
Serbia^{6}	8	5–3	63%	3–1	1–0	—	0–1	1–1	3–1	1–1	
Slovakia	2	2–0	100%	1–0	1–0	—	—	1–0	1–0	—	
Slovenia	1	1–0	100%	1–0	—	—	—	—	1–0	—	
South Africa	6	4–2	67%	4–1	—	—	—	—	4–1	0–1	
South Korea	3	3–0	100%	2–0	1–0	—	—	—	3–0	— (Note: Unknown record changed to Clay (outdoor) for the 2020 tie held in Cagliari.)	
Spain	13	7–6	54%	5–6	—	—	2–0	2–0	5–6	— (Note: Unknown record changed to Clay (outdoor) for 1977 tie held in Barcelona.)	
Sweden	22	13–9	59%	11–6	2–1	—	0–2	2–4	11–5	—	
Switzerland	7	4–3	57%	3–1	0–1	—	0–1	1–2	2–1	0–1	
Turkey	0	0–0	—	—	—	—	—	—	—	—	
United States	13	5–8	38%	1–3	3–1	1–3	0–1	3–2	2–6	—	
Zimbabwe^{7}	3	2–1	67%	2–0	0–1	—	—	—	2–1	—	
Total	269	177–92	66%	125–45	20–14	11–13	7–9	26–23	137–58	14–11	
Total	Ties	W–L	%	Clay	Hard	Grass	Carpet	Ind'r	Out'r	Unk'wn	

==== Notes ====
^{1} Includes ties competing as Australasia until 1922
^{2} Includes ties competing as Czechoslovakia from 1924 to 1993
^{3} Includes ties competing as West Germany until 1988
^{4} Includes ties competing as (United Kingdom) British Isles until 1912
^{5} Includes ties competing as Soviet Union until 1992
^{6} Includes ties competing as Yugoslavia until 2003; and as Serbia and Montenegro from 2004 to 2006
^{7} Includes ties competing as Rhodesia until 1977

== See also ==
- Italy Davis Cup team
