= 2010 Delray Beach International Tennis Championships – Doubles =

Tennis tournament

Doubles
- 2010 Delray Beach International Tennis Championships

Final
- Champions: (United States) Bob Bryan (United States) Mike Bryan
- Runners-up: (Germany) Philipp Marx (Slovakia) Igor Zelenay
- Score: 6–3, 7–6^{(7–3)}

Events
| Singles | Doubles |
| ← 2009 · | Delray Beach Open | · 2011 → |

The 2010 Delray Beach International Tennis Championships was a tennis tournament played on outdoor hard courts. The 18th edition of the Delray Beach International Tennis Championships, it was part of the International Series of the 2010 ATP World Tour. It took place at the Delray Beach Tennis Center in Delray Beach, Florida, United States, from February 22 through February 28, 2010. Bob Bryan and Mike Bryan were the defending champions and they won in the final 6–3, 7–6^{(7–3)}, against Philipp Marx and Igor Zelenay.

== Seeds ==
1. (United States) Bob Bryan / (United States) Mike Bryan (champions)
2. (Germany) Michael Kohlmann / (Germany) Philipp Petzschner (first round)
3. (United Kingdom) Ross Hutchins / (Australia) Jordan Kerr (first round)
4. (Brazil) André Sá / (Romania) Horia Tecău (first round)

== Draw ==
=== Key ===
- Q = Qualifier
- WC = Wild card
- LL = Lucky loser
- Alt = Alternate
- SE = Special exempt
- PR = Protected ranking
- ITF = ITF entry
- JE = Junior exempt
- w/o = Walkover
- r = Retired
- d = Defaulted
- SR = Special ranking

=== Draws ===
First round
1 | (United States) B Bryan (United States) M Bryan | 6 | 6
(Czech Republic) L Friedl (Czech Republic) D Škoch | 3 | 2
(Finland) J Nieminen (United States) B Reynolds | 6 | 4 | [10]
(South Africa) J Coetzee (United States) S Lipsky | 3 | 6 | [7]
4 | (Brazil) A Sá (Romania) H Tecău | 2 | 3
(United States) J Cerretani (France) J Chardy | 6 | 6
(United Kingdom) C Fleming (United Kingdom) K Skupski | 6^{5} | 4
WC | (United States) T Dent (United States) R Harrison | 7^{7} | 6
WC | (United States) J Blake (United States) R Kendrick | 6 | 6
ALT | (United States) E Butorac (United States) D Martin | 3 | 4
(Germany) P Marx (Slovakia) I Zelenay | 6^{8} | 6 | [10]
3 | (United Kingdom) R Hutchins (Australia) J Kerr | 7^{10} | 1 | [8]
(Germany) D Brands (Germany) F Mayer | 6^{6} | 7 | [6]
(South Africa) R de Voest (Netherlands) R Wassen | 7^{8} | 5 | [10]
(Germany) B Becker (Argentina) L Mayer | 7^{7} | 6
2 | (Germany) M Kohlmann (Germany) P Petzschner | 6^{4} | 4

Quarterfinals
1 | (United States) B Bryan (United States) M Bryan | 6 | 6
(Finland) J Nieminen (United States) B Reynolds | 1 | 4
(United States) J Cerretani (France) J Chardy | 3 | 6^{4}
WC | (United States) T Dent (United States) R Harrison | 6 | 7^{7}
WC | (United States) J Blake (United States) R Kendrick | 7^{7} | 4 | [6]
(Germany) P Marx (Slovakia) I Zelenay | 6^{5} | 6 | [10]
(South Africa) R de Voest (Netherlands) R Wassen | 3 | 3
(Germany) B Becker (Argentina) L Mayer | 6 | 6

Semifinals
1 | (United States) B Bryan (United States) M Bryan | 6^{6} | 7 | [10]
WC | (United States) T Dent (United States) R Harrison | 7^{8} | 5 | [4]
(Germany) P Marx (Slovakia) I Zelenay | w/o
(Germany) B Becker (Argentina) L Mayer

Final
1 | (United States) B Bryan (United States) M Bryan | 6 | 7^{7}
(Germany) P Marx (Slovakia) I Zelenay | 3 | 6^{3}
