= 2004 Davis Cup Asia/Oceania Zone Group III =

International tennis competition

The Group III tournament was held April 7–11, in Phu Tho Tennis Centre, Ho Chi Minh City, Vietnam, on outdoor hard courts.

== Format ==
The eight teams were split into two groups and played in a round-robin format. The top two teams of each group advanced to the promotion pool, from which the two top teams were promoted to the Asia/Oceania Zone Group II in 2005. The bottom two teams of each group were placed in the relegation pool, from which the two bottom teams were demoted to the Asia/Oceania Zone Group IV in 2005.

== Pool A ==
Pos	Team	Pld	W	L	Qualification	(Kazakhstan)	(Tajikistan)	(Qatar)	(Oman)
1	Kazakhstan	3	3	0	Advance to Promotion pool	—	3–0	3–0	3–0
2	Tajikistan	3	2	1	Advance to Promotion pool	0–3	—	3–0	3–0
3	Qatar	3	1	2	Advance to Relegation pool	0–3	0–3	—	3–0
4	Oman	3	0	3	Advance to Relegation pool	0–3	0–3	0–3	—

=== Kazakhstan vs. Oman ===
Kazakhstan
3
Phu Tho Tennis Centre, Ho Chi Minh City, Vietnam
7 April 2004
Hard

Oman
0

			1	2	3
1	(Kazakhstan) (Oman)	Dias Doskarayev; Mohammed Al Nabhani	6; 1	6; 1
2	(Kazakhstan) (Oman)	Alexey Kedryuk; Khalid Al Nabhani	6; 4	6; 4
3	(Kazakhstan) (Oman)	Alexey Kedryuk / Anton Tsymbalov; Khalid Al Nabhani / Mohammed Al Nabhani	6; 1	6; 2

=== Qatar vs. Tajikistan ===
Qatar
0
Phu Tho Tennis Centre, Ho Chi Minh City, Vietnam
7 April 2004
Hard

Tajikistan
3

			1	2	3
1	(Qatar) (Tajikistan)	Mohammed-Saadon Al Kawari; Mansur Yakhyaev	4; 6	6; 1	4; 6
2	(Qatar) (Tajikistan)	Sultan Khalfan Al Alawi; Sergey Makashin	0; 6	2; 2		retired
3	(Qatar) (Tajikistan)	Mohammed-Saadon Al Kawari / Amir Mohamed Ebrahim Bayoumi; Sergey Makashin / Mansur Yakhyaev	3; 6	3; 6

=== Kazakhstan vs. Tajikistan ===
Kazakhstan
3
Phu Tho Tennis Centre, Ho Chi Minh City, Vietnam
8 April 2004
Hard

Tajikistan
0

			1	2	3
1	(Kazakhstan) (Tajikistan)	Dias Doskarayev; Mansur Yakhyaev	6; 1	7^{9} 6^{7}
2	(Kazakhstan) (Tajikistan)	Alexey Kedryuk; Sergey Makashin	6; 0	6; 3
3	(Kazakhstan) (Tajikistan)	Alexey Kedryuk / Anton Tsymbalov; Sergey Makashin / Mansur Yakhyaev	6; 1	6; 0

=== Oman vs. Qatar ===
Oman
0
Phu Tho Tennis Centre, Ho Chi Minh City, Vietnam
8 April 2004
Hard

Qatar
3

			1	2	3
1	(Oman) (Qatar)	Mohammed Al Nabhani; Mohammed-Saadon Al Kawari	3; 6	3; 6
2	(Oman) (Qatar)	Khalid Al Nabhani; Amir Mohamed Ebrahim Bayoumi	5; 7	6; 3	2; 6
3	(Oman) (Qatar)	Khalid Al Nabhani / Mohammed Al Nabhani; Mohammed-Saadon Al Kawari / Abdullah Hassan	5; 7	7^{7} 6^{5}	3; 6

=== Kazakhstan vs. Qatar ===
Kazakhstan
3
Phu Tho Tennis Centre, Ho Chi Minh City, Vietnam
9 April 2004
Hard

Qatar
0

			1	2	3
1	(Kazakhstan) (Qatar)	Dias Doskarayev; Mohammed-Saadon Al Kawari	6; 0	6; 2
2	(Kazakhstan) (Qatar)	Alexey Kedryuk; Amir Mohamed Ebrahim Bayoumi	6; 0	6; 4
3	(Kazakhstan) (Qatar)	Alexey Kedryuk / Anton Tsymbalov; Mohammed-Saadon Al Kawari / Abdullah Hassan	6; 1	6; 2

=== Oman vs. Tajikistan ===
Oman
0
Phu Tho Tennis Centre, Ho Chi Minh City, Vietnam
9 April 2004
Hard

Tajikistan
3

			1	2	3
1	(Oman) (Tajikistan)	Mohammed Al Nabhani; Mansur Yakhyaev	2; 6	6; 4	2; 6
2	(Oman) (Tajikistan)	Khalid Al Nabhani; Sergey Makashin	1; 6	1; 6
3	(Oman) (Tajikistan)	Mohammed Al Nabhani / Sulaiman Al Rawahi; Sergey Makashin / Mansur Yakhyaev	4; 6	7^{7} 6^{2}	6; 8

== Pool B ==
Pos	Team	Pld	W	L	Qualification	(Pacific Oceania)	(Vietnam)	(Bahrain)	(Syria)
1	Pacific Oceania	3	3	0	Advance to Promotion pool	—	2–1	3–0	3–0
2	Vietnam	3	2	1	Advance to Promotion pool	1–2	—	2–1	3–0
3	Bahrain	3	1	2	Advance to Relegation pool	0–3	1–2	—	2–1
4	Syria	3	0	3	Advance to Relegation pool	0–3	0–3	1–2	—

=== Vietnam vs. Bahrain ===
Vietnam
2
Phu Tho Tennis Centre, Ho Chi Minh City, Vietnam
7 April 2004
Hard

Bahrain
1

			1	2	3
1	(Vietnam) (Bahrain)	Lê Quốc Khánh; Abdul-Rahman Shehab	2; 6	1; 6
2	(Vietnam) (Bahrain)	Đỗ Minh Quân; Esam Abdulaal	6; 2	5; 7	8; 6
3	(Vietnam) (Bahrain)	Huỳnh Chí Khương / Lê Quốc Khánh; Khaled Al Thawadi / Abdul-Rahman Shehab	6; 4	3; 6	6; 3

=== Pacific Oceania vs. Syria ===
Pacific Oceania
3
Phu Tho Tennis Centre, Ho Chi Minh City, Vietnam
7 April 2004
Hard

Syria
0

			1	2	3
1	(Pacific Oceania) (Syria)	Juan Sebastien Langton; Lays Salim	7^{7} 6^{4}	6; 1
2	(Pacific Oceania) (Syria)	Michael Leong; Abraham Ibrahim	6; 1	6; 4
3	(Pacific Oceania) (Syria)	Brett Baudinet / Juan Sebastien Langton; Mowafak Al Hafez / Hayan Maarouf	6; 4	6; 2

=== Vietnam vs. Syria ===
Vietnam
3
Phu Tho Tennis Centre, Ho Chi Minh City, Vietnam
8 April 2004
Hard

Syria
0

			1	2	3
1	(Vietnam) (Syria)	Ngô Quang Huy; Lays Salim	6; 4	6; 1
2	(Vietnam) (Syria)	Đỗ Minh Quân; Abraham Ibrahim	6; 3	6; 1
3	(Vietnam) (Syria)	Huỳnh Chí Khương / Lê Quốc Khánh; Mowafak Al Hafez / Hayan Maarouf	6; 3	6; 3

=== Bahrain vs. Pacific Oceania ===
Bahrain
0
Phu Tho Tennis Centre, Ho Chi Minh City, Vietnam
8 April 2004
Hard

Pacific Oceania
3

			1	2	3
1	(Bahrain) (Pacific Oceania)	Abdul-Rahman Shehab; Juan Sebastien Langton	6; 4	3; 6	4; 6
2	(Bahrain) (Pacific Oceania)	Khaled Al Thawadi; Michael Leong	0; 6	0; 6
3	(Bahrain) (Pacific Oceania)	Esam Abdulaal / Abdulkarim Abdulnabi; Brett Baudinet / Juan Sebastien Langton	1; 6	4; 6

=== Vietnam vs. Pacific Oceania ===
Vietnam
1
Phu Tho Tennis Centre, Ho Chi Minh City, Vietnam
9 April 2004
Hard

Pacific Oceania
2

			1	2	3
1	(Vietnam) (Pacific Oceania)	Ngô Quang Huy; Juan Sebastien Langton	3; 6	4; 6
2	(Vietnam) (Pacific Oceania)	Đỗ Minh Quân; Michael Leong	5; 7	6; 4	6; 3
3	(Vietnam) (Pacific Oceania)	Huỳnh Chí Khương / Lê Quốc Khánh; Brett Baudinet / Juan Sebastien Langton	6^{4} 7^{7}	6^{6} 7^{8}

=== Bahrain vs. Syria ===
Bahrain
2
Phu Tho Tennis Centre, Ho Chi Minh City, Vietnam
9 April 2004
Hard

Syria
1

			1	2	3
1	(Bahrain) (Syria)	Abdul-Rahman Shehab; Lays Salim	6; 1	6; 2
2	(Bahrain) (Syria)	Esam Abdulaal; Abraham Ibrahim	6; 3	6; 4
3	(Bahrain) (Syria)	Khaled Al Thawadi / Abdul-Rahman Shehab; Mowafak Al Hafez / Hayan Maarouf	4; 6	3; 6

== Promotion pool ==
The top two teams from each of Pools A and B advanced to the Promotion pool. Results and points from games against the opponent from the preliminary round were carried forward.

Pos	Team	Pld	W	L	Promotion	(Kazakhstan)	(Pacific Oceania)	(Vietnam)	(Tajikistan)
1	Kazakhstan	3	3	0	Promoted to Group II	—	2–1	3–0	3–0 (Note: Carried over from Pool A)
2	Pacific Oceania	3	2	1	Promoted to Group II	1–2	—	2–1 (Note: Carried over from Pool B)	2–1
3	Vietnam	3	1	2		0–3	1–2	—	2–0
4	Tajikistan	3	0	3		0–3	1–2	0–2	—

=== Kazakhstan vs. Vietnam ===
Kazakhstan
3
Phu Tho Tennis Centre, Ho Chi Minh City, Vietnam
10 April 2004
Hard

Vietnam
0

			1	2	3
1	(Kazakhstan) (Vietnam)	Dias Doskarayev; Lê Quốc Khánh	6; 0	6; 1
2	(Kazakhstan) (Vietnam)	Alexey Kedryuk; Đỗ Minh Quân	6; 4	6; 2
3	(Kazakhstan) (Vietnam)	Alexey Kedryuk / Anton Tsymbalov; Đỗ Minh Quân / Lê Quốc Khánh	6; 3	6; 1

=== Tajikistan vs. Pacific Oceania ===
Tajikistan
1
Phu Tho Tennis Centre, Ho Chi Minh City, Vietnam
10 April 2004
Hard

Pacific Oceania
2

			1	2	3
1	(Tajikistan) (Pacific Oceania)	Mansur Yakhyaev; Juan Sebastien Langton	6; 2	7^{7} 6^{5}
2	(Tajikistan) (Pacific Oceania)	Sergey Makashin; Michael Leong	1; 6	6^{5} 7^{7}
3	(Tajikistan) (Pacific Oceania)	Sergey Makashin / Mansur Yakhyaev; Brett Baudinet / Juan Sebastien Langton	4; 6	6^{6} 7^{8}

=== Kazakhstan vs. Pacific Oceania ===
Kazakhstan
2
Phu Tho Tennis Centre, Ho Chi Minh City, Vietnam
11 April 2004
Hard

Pacific Oceania
1

			1	2	3
1	(Kazakhstan) (Pacific Oceania)	Anton Tsymbalov; Brett Baudinet	6; 3	6; 1
2	(Kazakhstan) (Pacific Oceania)	Dias Doskarayev; Michael Leong	7^{8} 6^{6}	2; 2		retired
3	(Kazakhstan) (Pacific Oceania)	Alexey Kedryuk / Anton Tsymbalov; Brett Baudinet / Juan Sebastien Langton	6; 2	6; 2

=== Tajikistan vs. Vietnam ===
Tajikistan
0
Phu Tho Tennis Centre, Ho Chi Minh City, Vietnam
11 April 2004
Hard

Vietnam
2

			1	2	3
1	(Tajikistan) (Vietnam)	Mansur Yakhyaev; Ngô Quang Huy	3; 6	2; 6
2	(Tajikistan) (Vietnam)	Sergey Makashin; Đỗ Minh Quân	2; 6	3; 6
3	(Tajikistan) (Vietnam)

Kazakhstan and Pacific Oceania promoted to Group II in 2005.

== Relegation pool ==
The bottom two teams from Pools A and B were placed in the relegation group. Results and points from games against the opponent from the preliminary round were carried forward.

Pos	Team	Pld	W	L	Qualification	(Bahrain)	(Qatar)	(Oman)	(Syria)
1	Bahrain	3	3	0		—	2–1	3–0	2–1 (Note: Carried over from Pool B)
2	Qatar	3	2	1		1–2	—	3–0 (Note: Carried over from Pool A)	3–0
3	Oman	3	1	2	Relegated to Group IV	0–3	3–0	—	2–1
4	Syria	3	0	3	Relegated to Group IV	1–2	0–3	1–2	—

=== Qatar vs. Syria ===
Qatar
3
Phu Tho Tennis Centre, Ho Chi Minh City, Vietnam
10 April 2004
Hard

Syria
0

			1	2	3
1	(Qatar) (Syria)	Mohammed-Saadon Al Kawari; Hayan Maarouf	6; 3	7; 5
2	(Qatar) (Syria)	Amir Mohamed Ebrahim Bayoumi; Abraham Ibrahim	6; 4	6; 4
3	(Qatar) (Syria)	Mohammed-Saadon Al Kawari / Abdullah Hassan; Mowafak Al Hafez / Lays Salim	6; 4	6; 4

=== Oman vs. Bahrain ===
Oman
0
Phu Tho Tennis Centre, Ho Chi Minh City, Vietnam
10 April 2004
Hard

Bahrain
3

			1	2	3
1	(Oman) (Bahrain)	Mohammed Al Nabhani; Abdul-Rahman Shehab	7; 5	4; 6	4; 6
2	(Oman) (Bahrain)	Khalid Al Nabhani; Esam Abdulaal	1; 6	7; 5	2; 6
3	(Oman) (Bahrain)	Sulaiman Al Rawahi / Saleh Al Zadjali; Abdulkarim Abdulnabi / Khaled Al Thawadi	0; 6	3; 6

=== Qatar vs. Bahrain ===
Qatar
1
Phu Tho Tennis Centre, Ho Chi Minh City, Vietnam
16 July 2004
Hard

Bahrain
2

			1	2	3
1	(Qatar) (Bahrain)	Abdullah Hassan; Abdul-Rahman Shehab	2; 6	6; 0		retired
2	(Qatar) (Bahrain)	Amir Mohamed Ebrahim Bayoumi; Esam Abdulaal	6^{4} 7^{7}	1; 6
3	(Qatar) (Bahrain)	Mohammed-Saadon Al Kawari / Abdullah Hassan; Esam Abdulaal / Abdul-Rahman Shehab	2; 6	6; 2	6; 8

=== Oman vs. Syria ===
Oman
2
Phu Tho Tennis Centre, Ho Chi Minh City, Vietnam
11 April 2004
Hard

Syria
1

			1	2	3
1	(Oman) (Syria)	Mohammed Al Nabhani; Mowafak Al Hafez	0; 6	6; 1	6; 4
2	(Oman) (Syria)	Khalid Al Nabhani; Hayan Maarouf	3; 6	2; 6
3	(Oman) (Syria)	Khalid Al Nabhani / Mohammed Al Nabhani; Mowafak Al Hafez / Lays Salim	6; 3	6; 3
