= 2009 Delray Beach International Tennis Championships – Doubles =

Doubles
- 2009 Delray Beach International Tennis Championships

Final
- Champions: (United States) Bob Bryan; (United States) Mike Bryan
- Runners-up: (Brazil) Marcelo Melo; (Brazil) André Sá
- Score: 6-4, 6-4

Events
Singles	Doubles
← 2008 ·	Delray Beach Open	· 2010 →

Max Mirnyi and Jamie Murray were the defending champions, but did not compete together that year.
Mirnyi partnered with Ashley Fisher, but lost in the first round to Bob Bryan and Mike Bryan.
Murray partnered with Dušan Vemić, but lost in the quarterfinals to Rajeev Ram and Bobby Reynolds.
Bob Bryan and Mike Bryan won in the final, 6–4, 6–4, over Marcelo Melo and André Sá.

== Seeds ==
1. (United States) Bob Bryan / (United States) Mike Bryan (champions)
2. (Brazil) Marcelo Melo / (Brazil) André Sá (final)
3. (United Kingdom) Jamie Murray / (Serbia) Dušan Vemić (quarterfinals)
4. (United States) Eric Butorac / (Brazil) Bruno Soares (semifinals)

== Draw ==
=== Key ===
- Q = Qualifier
- WC = Wild card
- LL = Lucky loser
- Alt = Alternate
- SE = Special exempt
- PR = Protected ranking
- ITF = ITF entry
- JE = Junior exempt
- w/o = Walkover
- r = Retired
- d = Defaulted
- SR = Special ranking

=== Draw ===
First round

Quarterfinals

Semifinals

Final

1
- (United States) B Bryan
- (United States) M Bryan
7
6

- (Australia) A Fisher
- (Belarus) M Mirnyi
5
3

1
- (United States) B Bryan
- (United States) M Bryan
7^{9}
3
[12]

- (France) J Chardy
- (Luxembourg) G Müller
0
4

- (United States) S Lipsky
- (United States) D Martin
6^{7}
6
[10]

- (United States) S Lipsky
- (United States) D Martin
6
6

1
- (United States) B Bryan
- (United States) M Bryan
1
6
[12]

4
- (United States) E Butorac
- (Brazil) B Soares
6
6

4
- (United States) E Butorac
- (Brazil) B Soares
6
2
[10]

ALT
- (Germany) D Gremelmayr
- (Austria) S Koubek
4
4

4
- (United States) E Butorac
- (Brazil) B Soares
4
6
[10]

- (India) R Bopanna
- (Finland) J Nieminen
6
7

- (India) R Bopanna
- (Finland) J Nieminen
6
3
[8]

ALT
- (Chile) P Capdeville
- (Russia) E Korolev
4
5

1
- (United States) B Bryan
- (United States) M Bryan
6
6

- (United States) R Ram
- (United States) B Reynolds
6
7

2
- (Brazil) M Melo
- (Brazil) A Sá
4
4

WC
- (Belgium) X Malisse
- (United States) V Spadea
2
5

- (United States) R Ram
- (United States) B Reynolds
6
6

WC
- (Germany) T Haas
- (United States) G Hill
3
6
[10]

3
- (United Kingdom) J Murray
- (Serbia) D Vemić
4
2

3
- (United Kingdom) J Murray
- (Serbia) D Vemić
6
3
[12]

- (United States) R Ram
- (United States) B Reynolds
6^{10}
6
[5]

- (Russia) I Kunitsyn
- (Germany) M Zverev
6^{7}
4

2
- (Brazil) M Melo
- (Brazil) A Sá
7^{12}
2
[10]

- (Germany) P Petzschner
- (Austria) A Peya
7^{9}
6

- (Germany) P Petzschner
- (Austria) A Peya

- (Belgium) S Darcis
- (Belgium) C Rochus
3
4

2
- (Brazil) M Melo
- (Brazil) A Sá
w/o

2
- (Brazil) M Melo
- (Brazil) A Sá
6
6
