= Jānis Skroderis =

Latvian tennis player

Janis Skroderis
- Country (sports): Latvia
- Residence: Riga, Latvian SSR, Soviet Union
- Born: August 14, 1983 (age 41); Jūrmala, Soviet Union
- Turned pro: 2002
- Plays: Right-handed (Double-handed backhand)
- Prize money: US $1,965

Singles
- Career record: 0–2
- Career titles: 0
- Highest ranking: 1233 (June 21, 2004)

Doubles
- Career record: 0–1
- Career titles: 0
- Highest ranking: 1186 (August 9, 2004)
- Last updated on: June 19, 2012.

Janis Skroderis (born August 14, 1983) is a Latvian former professional tennis player.

== Career ==
Notably, Skroderis was the very first player that future world No. 1 Novak Djokovic ever faced in an official ATP match, a dead rubber in the 2004 Davis Cup match between Serbia and Montenegro and Latvia, which he lost 2–6, 2–6. Talking about this match, Skroderis stated: “I remember that I had several chances in that match because Novak was very young and inexperienced, but when it was necessary, he increased the pace and won both sets. After that match, he won several Challengers and his career took off. It seems that it was me who brought him luck, so I am very happy”.

He played mainly on the ITF Futures tournaments. Skroderis' career high in the ATP singles rankings was position No. 1233, which he achieved in June 2004, and the official statistics say that he only played two matches at ATP level, losing both of them.
