= 2010 Delray Beach International Tennis Championships =

- Date: February 22–28
- Edition: 18th
- Category: International Series
- Draw: 32S / 16D
- Prize money: $442,500
- Surface: Hard / outdoor
- Location: Delray Beach, Florida, U.S.
- Venue: Delray Beach Tennis Center

Champions

Singles
- (Latvia) Ernests Gulbis

Doubles
- (United States) Bob Bryan / (United States) Mike Bryan
- Delray Beach Open

The 2010 Delray Beach International Tennis Championships was a tennis tournament played on outdoor hard courts. It was the 18th edition of the Delray Beach International Tennis Championships, and was part of the International Series of the 2010 ATP World Tour. It took place at the Delray Beach Tennis Center in Delray Beach, Florida, United States, from February 22 through February 28, 2010. Unseeded Ernests Gulbis won the singles title.

== ATP entrants ==
=== Seeds ===
Athlete	Nationality	Ranking*	Seeding
Tommy Haas	Germany	18	1
Ivo Karlović	Croatia	33	2
Benjamin Becker	Germany	40	3
Jérémy Chardy	France	41	4
Evgeny Korolev	Kazakhstan	49	5
Florian Mayer	Germany	51	6
James Blake	United States	55	7
Michael Russell	United States	68	8

- Rankings as of February 15, 2010.

=== Other entrants ===
The following players received wildcards into the main draw:

- (Germany) Tommy Haas
- (France) Sébastien Grosjean
- (United States) Vincent Spadea

The following players received entry from the qualifying draw:

- (South Africa) Kevin Anderson
- (United States) Ryan Harrison
- (United States) Robert Kendrick
- (Australia) Nick Lindahl

== Finals ==
=== Singles ===
(Latvia) Ernests Gulbis defeated (Croatia) Ivo Karlović, 6–2, 6–3.

- It was Gulbis' first singles title of his career.

=== Doubles ===
(United States) Bob Bryan / (United States) Mike Bryan defeated (Germany) Philipp Marx / (Slovakia) Igor Zelenay, 6–3, 7–6^{(7–3)}.
