= 2009 Delray Beach International Tennis Championships – Singles =

Singles
- 2009 Delray Beach International Tennis Championships

Final
- Champion: (United States) Mardy Fish
- Runner-up: (Russia) Evgeny Korolev
- Score: 7–5, 6–3

Details
- Draw: 32
- Seeds: 8

Events
Singles	Doubles
- Delray Beach Open

Kei Nishikori was the defending champion, but chose not to participate this year.

In the final, Mardy Fish defeated Evgeny Korolev, 7–5, 6–3.

== Seeds ==
1. (United States) Mardy Fish (champion)
2. (United States) Sam Querrey (second round)
3. (Latvia) Ernests Gulbis (first round)
4. (Russia) Igor Kunitsyn (first round)
5. (Belgium) Steve Darcis (first round)
6. (France) Florent Serra (quarterfinals)
7. (France) Jérémy Chardy (semifinals)
8. (Chinese Taipei) Lu Yen-hsun (second round)

== Draw ==
Key

- Q = Qualifier
- WC = Wild card
- LL = Lucky loser
- Alt = Alternate
- ITF = ITF entry
- PR = Protected ranking
- SR = Special ranking
- SE = Special exempt
- JE = Junior exempt
- JR = Junior Accelerator Programme entrant
- CO = College Accelerator Programme entrant
- NG = Next Gen Accelerator Program entrant
- w/o = Walkover
- r = Retired
- d = Defaulted

=== Finals ===
Semifinals
1	(United States) Mardy Fish	6	6
7	(France) Jérémy Chardy	4	1
Q	(Russia) Evgeny Korolev	6	7
(Belgium) Christophe Rochus	1	5

Final
1	(United States) Mardy Fish	7	6
Q	(Russia) Evgeny Korolev	5	3

=== Top half ===
First round
1	(United States) M Fish	7	6
Q	(Canada) F Dancevic	5	3
(United States) V Spadea	2	7	6
(Germany) D Gremelmayr	6	5	1
Q	(United States) T Dent	4	3
(Germany) M Zverev	6	6
(Finland) J Nieminen	3	6^{5}
6	(France) F Serra	6	7^{7}
3	(Latvia) E Gulbis	5	2
(Cyprus) M Baghdatis	7	6
(Germany) P Petzschner	3	1^{r}
SE	(Israel) D Sela	6	4
(Kazakhstan) A Golubev	6	6
WC	(United States) E King	2	4
(Germany) T Haas	6^{7}	3
7	(France) J Chardy	7^{9}	6

Second round
1	(United States) M Fish	6	6
(United States) V Spadea	4	1
(Germany) M Zverev	3	6	4
6	(France) F Serra	6	4	6
(Cyprus) M Baghdatis	7^{9}	6
SE	(Israel) D Sela	6^{7}	3
(Kazakhstan) A Golubev	6^{4}	5
7	(France) J Chardy	7^{7}	7

Quarterfinals
1	(United States) M Fish	7^{7}	7^{7}
6	(France) F Serra	6^{2}	6^{4}
(Cyprus) M Baghdatis	6^{7}	6^{3}
7	(France) J Chardy	7^{9}	7^{7}

Semifinals
1	(United States) M Fish	6	6
7	(France) J Chardy	4	1

=== Bottom half ===
First round
5	(Belgium) S Darcis	3	4
(Spain) G García-López	6	6
Q	(United States) R Sweeting	6^{5}	2
(Luxembourg) G Müller	7^{7}	6
(Chile) P Capdeville	6	2	1
(United States) R Kendrick	4	6	6
Q	(Russia) E Korolev	6	7^{7}
4	(Russia) I Kunitsyn	4	6^{3}
8	(Chinese Taipei) Y-h Lu	7	2	6
WC	(Australia) L Hewitt	5	6	2
(Austria) S Koubek	6	6
(United States) B Reynolds	4	3
(Croatia) R Karanušić	3	4
(Belgium) C Rochus	6	6
(Argentina) G Cañas	6^{3}	4
2/WC	(United States) S Querrey	7^{7}	6

Second round
(Spain) G García-López	5	6	6
(Luxembourg) G Müller	7	3	3
(United States) R Kendrick	6	3	5
Q	(Russia) E Korolev	3	6	7
8	(Chinese Taipei) Y-h Lu	4	3
(Austria) S Koubek	6	6
(Belgium) C Rochus	6	6
2/WC	(United States) S Querrey	4	1

Quarterfinals
(Spain) G García-López	2	2
Q	(Russia) E Korolev	6	6
(Austria) S Koubek	3	6^{6}
(Belgium) C Rochus	6	7^{8}

Semifinals
Q	(Russia) E Korolev	6	7
(Belgium) C Rochus	1	5

== Qualifying ==
=== Seeds ===
1. (United States) Wayne Odesnik (qualifying competition)
2. (Kazakhstan) Evgeny Korolev (qualified)
3. (United States) ~~Kevin Kim~~ (withdrew due to being placed in the main draw for the Mexican Open)
4. (Germany) Benjamin Becker (qualifying competition)
5. (Germany) Simon Greul (first round)
6. (Canada) Frank Dancevic (qualified)
7. (Australia) Chris Guccione (first round, retired due to a left arm injury)
8. (United States) Donald Young (first round)

=== Qualifiers ===
1. (Canada) Frank Dancevic
2. (Kazakhstan) Evgeny Korolev
3. (United States) Taylor Dent
4. (United States) Ryan Sweeting

=== Draw ===
==== First qualifier ====
First round
1	(United States) Wayne Odesnik	6	6
WC	(Canada) Jonathan David	0	0
(United States) Rajeev Ram	6	6
(Serbia) Dušan Vemić	4	4
(United States) John Isner	6	6
(India) Rohan Bopanna	2	1
WC	(United States) Matt Bocko	1	6	3
6	(Canada) Frank Dancevic	6	3	6

Second round
1	(United States) Wayne Odesnik	6	6
(United States) Rajeev Ram	2	3
(United States) John Isner	6^{5}	2
6	(Canada) Frank Dancevic	7^{7}	6

Qualifying competition
1	(United States) Wayne Odesnik	7^{7}	4	2
6	(Canada) Frank Dancevic	6^{3}	6	6

==== Second qualifier ====
First round
2	(Kazakhstan) Evgeny Korolev	4	6	6
(Netherlands) Jesse Huta Galung	6	3	2
(South Korea) Jun Woong-sun	3	6	2
(Canada) Jesse Levine	6	4	6
(Canada) Peter Polansky	6	6
(Netherlands) Matwé Middelkoop	4	4
WC	(Latvia) Adrians Zguns	6	4
7	(Australia) Chris Guccione	4	2^{r}

Second round
2	(Kazakhstan) Evgeny Korolev	6	6
(Canada) Jesse Levine	3	4
(Canada) Peter Polansky	6	6
WC	(Latvia) Adrians Zguns	1	4

Qualifying competition
2	(Kazakhstan) Evgeny Korolev	6	6
(Canada) Peter Polansky	4	2

==== Third qualifier ====
First round
Alt	(United States) Eric Nunez	4	7^{8}	6^{5}
(Slovakia) Luka Gregorc	6	6^{6}	7^{7}
(Serbia) Vladimir Obradović	3	6^{4}
(Ecuador) Giovanni Lapentti	6	7^{7}
(United States) Todd Widom	3	2
(Belgium) Xavier Malisse	6	6
WC	(United States) Taylor Dent	6	6
5	(Germany) Simon Greul	3	3

Second round
(Slovakia) Luka Gregorc	2	4
(Ecuador) Giovanni Lapentti	6	6
(Belgium) Xavier Malisse	5	3
WC	(United States) Taylor Dent	7	6

Qualifying competition
(Ecuador) Giovanni Lapentti	3	3
WC	(United States) Taylor Dent	6	6

==== Fourth qualifier ====
First round
4	(Germany) Benjamin Becker	6	3	6
(Bosnia and Herzegovina) Amer Delić	4	6	3
(Paraguay) Ramón Delgado	6	6
(Brazil) Ricardo Mello	4	0
(United States) Ryan Sweeting	6	6
(United States) Michael Yani	3	2
(India) Somdev Devvarman	6	6
8	(United States) Donald Young	4	4

Second round
4	(Germany) Benjamin Becker	6	5	6
(Paraguay) Ramón Delgado	4	7	0
(United States) Ryan Sweeting	7	6
(India) Somdev Devvarman	5	4

Qualifying competition
4	(Germany) Benjamin Becker	6^{4}	1
(United States) Ryan Sweeting	7^{7}	6
