= Ilie Babinciuc =

Moldovan tennis player

- Country (sports): Moldova
- Born: 6 December 1985 (age 40)
- Plays: Right-handed
- Prize money: $1,146

Doubles
- Career record: 0–0
- Career titles: 0
- Highest ranking: No. 1225 (8 September 2014)

Ilie Babinciuc (born 6 December 1985) is a tennis player from Moldova. He was part of the Moldova Davis Cup team for two ties in 2004.
