= 2005 Davis Cup Asia/Oceania Zone Group II =

One of three zones of regional Davis Cup 2005

The Asia/Oceania Zone was one of the three zones of the regional Davis Cup competition in 2005.

In the Asia/Oceania Zone there were four tiers, called groups, in which teams compete against each other to advance to the upper tier. Winners in Group II advanced to the Asia/Oceania Zone Group I. Teams who lost their respective ties competed in the relegation play-offs, with winning teams remaining in Group II, whereas teams who lost their play-offs were relegated to the Asia/Oceania Zone Group III in 2006.

== Participating nations ==
- Iran
- Kazakhstan
- Kuwait
- Lebanon
- New Zealand
- Pacific Oceania
- Philippines
- South Korea

=== Draw ===
Play-offs
Tehran, Iran (clay)
Kazakhstan	3
4	Iran	2
Beirut, Lebanon (clay)
3	Lebanon	3
Philippines	2

First Round
Auckland, New Zealand (indoor hard)
1	New Zealand	4
Kazakhstan	1
Tehran, Iran (clay)
4	Iran	1
Kuwait	4
Lautoka, Fiji (hard)
Pacific Oceania	3
3	Lebanon	2
Manila, Philippines (indoor clay)
Philippines	2
2	South Korea	3

Second Round
Auckland, New Zealand (indoor hard)
1	New Zealand	3
Kuwait	2
Seoul, South Korea (hard)
Pacific Oceania	0
2	South Korea	5

Third Round
Auckland, New Zealand (indoor hard)
1	New Zealand	2
2	South Korea	3

- Iran and the Philippines relegated to Group III in 2006.
- South Korea promoted to Group I in 2006.

== First round ==
=== New Zealand vs. Kazakhstan ===
New Zealand
4
More FM Tennis Park, Auckland, New Zealand
4–6 March 2005
Hard (indoors)

Kazakhstan
1

			1	2	3	4	5
1	(New Zealand) (Kazakhstan)	Mark Nielsen; Dmitriy Makeyev	6; 0	6; 2	6; 3
2	(New Zealand) (Kazakhstan)	GD Jones; Alexey Kedryuk	6; 3	6; 4	6; 4
3	(New Zealand) (Kazakhstan)	Mark Nielsen / Matthew Prentice; Alexey Kedryuk / Dmitriy Makeyev	6; 3	6; 2	6; 2
4	(New Zealand) (Kazakhstan)	Jose Statham; Alexey Kedryuk	4; 6	5; 7
5	(New Zealand) (Kazakhstan)	GD Jones; Stanislav Bykov	6; 1	6; 0

=== Iran vs. Kuwait ===
Iran
1
Enghelab Sports Complex, Tehran, Iran
4–6 March 2005
Clay

Kuwait
4

			1	2	3	4	5
1	(Iran) (Kuwait)	Ashkan Shokoofi; Abdullah Maqdes	6^{7} 7^{9}	5; 7	3; 6
2	(Iran) (Kuwait)	Anoosha Shahgholi; Mohammad Ghareeb	5; 7	6^{5} 7^{7}	3; 6
3	(Iran) (Kuwait)	Ashkan Shokoofi / Seyed Akbar Taheri Rahaghi; Mohammad Ghareeb / Mohammad-Khaliq Siddiq	1; 6	4; 6	5; 7
4	(Iran) (Kuwait)	Shahab Hassani-Nafez; Ahmad Rabeea Muhammad	6; 2	7; 5
5	(Iran) (Kuwait)	Anoosha Shahgholi; Abdullah Maqdes	3; 6	3; 6

=== Pacific Oceania vs. Lebanon ===
Pacific Oceania
3
Dr Robin Mitchell Regional Tennis Centre, Lautoka, Fiji
4–6 March 2005
Hard

Lebanon
2

			1	2	3	4	5
1	(Pacific Oceania) (Lebanon)	Michael Leong; Patrick Chucri	6; 3	2; 6	6; 3	5; 7	3; 0	retired
2	(Pacific Oceania) (Lebanon)	Juan Sebastien Langton; Karim Alayli	6^{6} 7^{8}	6; 3	6; 1	7; 5
3	(Pacific Oceania) (Lebanon)	Brett Baudinet / Juan Sebastien Langton; Patrick Chucri / Jicham Zaatini	3; 6	6^{0} 7^{7}	6^{4} 7^{7}
4	(Pacific Oceania) (Lebanon)	Michael Leong; Jicham Zaatini	7; 5	6^{14} 7^{16}	6; 3	4; 6	6; 2
5	(Pacific Oceania) (Lebanon)	Brett Baudinet; Patrick Chucri	4; 6	6; 2	2; 6

=== Philippines vs. South Korea ===
Philippines
2
Philippine Columbian Association, Manila, Philippines
4–6 March 2005
Clay (indoors)

South Korea
3

			1	2	3	4	5
1	(Philippines) (South Korea)	Patrick John Tierro; Suk Hyun-joon	7; 5	7; 5	6; 4
2	(Philippines) (South Korea)	Johnny Arcilla; Jun Woong-sun	4; 6	6; 3	6^{7} 7^{9}	6; 4	4; 6
3	(Philippines) (South Korea)	Johnny Arcilla / Rolando Ruel; Chung Hee-seok / Kim Dong-hyun	4; 6	0; 6	0; 6
4	(Philippines) (South Korea)	Patrick John Tierro; Jun Woong-sun	3; 6	3; 6	3; 6
5	(Philippines) (South Korea)	Johnny Arcilla; Suk Hyun-joon	6; 2	7; 5

== Second round ==
=== New Zealand vs. Kuwait ===
New Zealand
3
More FM Tennis Park, Auckland, New Zealand
15–17 July 2005
Hard (indoors)

Kuwait
2

			1	2	3	4	5
1	(New Zealand) (Kuwait)	Mark Nielsen; Abdullah Maqdes	7^{7} 6^{1}	1; 6	6; 4	6; 1
2	(New Zealand) (Kuwait)	GD Jones; Mohammad Ghareeb	3; 6	6; 4	7; 5	6; 2
3	(New Zealand) (Kuwait)	Daniel King-Turner / Mark Nielsen; Mohammad Ghareeb / Mohammad-Khaliq Siddiq	7^{7} 6^{4}	6; 4	6; 4
4	(New Zealand) (Kuwait)	Adam Thompson; Mohammad Ghareeb	5; 7	3; 6
5	(New Zealand) (Kuwait)	Daniel King-Turner; Abdullah Maqdes	6^{4} 7^{7}	7; 5	3; 6

=== South Korea vs. Pacific Oceania ===
South Korea
5
Olympic Tennis Court, Seoul, South Korea
15–17 July 2005
Hard

Pacific Oceania
0

			1	2	3	4	5
1	(South Korea) (Pacific Oceania)	Kim Sun-yong; Michael Leong	6; 0	3; 6	6; 4	6; 3
2	(South Korea) (Pacific Oceania)	Jun Woong-sun; West Nott	7; 5	6; 4	6; 1
3	(South Korea) (Pacific Oceania)	Jun Woong-sun / Kwon Oh-hee; Brett Baudinet / Juan Sebastien Langton	6; 1	6; 0	6; 4
4	(South Korea) (Pacific Oceania)	An Jae-sung; Michael Leong	6; 4	6; 3
5	(South Korea) (Pacific Oceania)	Kim Sun-yong; Juan Sebastien Langton	6; 4	6; 3

== Relegation play-offs ==
=== Iran vs. Kazakhstan ===
Iran
2
Enghelab Sports Complex, Tehran, Iran
15–17 July 2005
Clay

Kazakhstan
3

			1	2	3	4	5
1	(Iran) (Kazakhstan)	Shahab Hassani-Nafez; Alexey Kedryuk	5; 7	1; 6	2; 6
2	(Iran) (Kazakhstan)	Ashkan Shokoofi; Dmitriy Makeyev	6; 3	6; 4	6; 0
3	(Iran) (Kazakhstan)	Ramin Raziyani / Ashkan Shokoofi; Alexey Kedryuk / Anton Tsymbalov	4; 6	2; 6	6^{4} 7^{7}
4	(Iran) (Kazakhstan)	Ashkan Shokoofi; Alexey Kedryuk	3; 6	1; 6	4; 6
5	(Iran) (Kazakhstan)	Anoosha Shahgholi; Dmitriy Makeyev	6; 3	6^{5} 7^{7}	6; 4

=== Lebanon vs. Philippines ===
Lebanon
3
Golf Club of Lebanon, Beirut, Lebanon
15–17 July 2005
Clay

Philippines
2

			1	2	3	4	5
1	(Lebanon) (Philippines)	Patrick Chucri; Johnny Arcilla	6; 2	6; 2	6; 2
2	(Lebanon) (Philippines)	Karim Alayli; Patrick John Tierro	3; 6	6; 3	4; 6	6; 1	5; 7
3	(Lebanon) (Philippines)	Karim Alayli / Patrick Chucri; Adelo Abadia / Johnny Arcilla	2; 6	6; 3	4; 6	6; 4	6; 4
4	(Lebanon) (Philippines)	Patrick Chucri; Patrick John Tierro	7^{7} 6^{5}	7^{10} 6^{8}	1; 6	4; 6	5; 7
5	(Lebanon) (Philippines)	Karim Alayli; Johnny Arcilla	6; 2	7^{7} 6^{5}	6; 1

== Third round ==
=== New Zealand vs. South Korea ===
New Zealand
2
More FM Tennis Park, Auckland, New Zealand
23–25 September 2005
Hard (indoors)

South Korea
3

			1	2	3	4	5
1	(New Zealand) (South Korea)	Mark Nielsen; Im Kyu-tae	0; 6	4; 6	6; 4	6; 0	5; 2	retired
2	(New Zealand) (South Korea)	Daniel King-Turner; Lee Hyung-taik	1; 6	6^{5} 7^{7}	1; 6
3	(New Zealand) (South Korea)	Daniel King-Turner / Mark Nielsen; Kwon Oh-hee / Lee Hyung-taik	2; 6	2; 6	2; 6
4	(New Zealand) (South Korea)	Mark Nielsen; Lee Hyung-taik	2; 6	6^{8} 7^{10}	3; 6
5	(New Zealand) (South Korea)	Jose Statham; Kim Sun-yong	6; 4	6; 4
