= Serbia and Montenegro Davis Cup team =

- First year: 2004
- Years played: 3
- Ties played (W–L): 8 (6–2)
- Most total wins: Janko Tipsarević (10–4)
- Most singles wins: Janko Tipsarević (10–3)
- Most doubles wins: Nenad Zimonjić (4–2)
- Best doubles team: Dusan Vemic and Nenad Zimonjić (2–1)
- Most ties played: Janko Tipsarević (8)
- Most years played: Nenad Zimonjić (3); Janko Tipsarević (3); Novak Djokovic (3)

Serbia and Montenegro men's national tennis team represented Serbia and Montenegro in international tennis competitions in 2004–2006.

== See also ==
- Davis Cup
