= Delray Beach Tennis Center =

Tennis venue

Coordinates: 26°27′45.70″N 80°04′32″W

- Interactive map of Delray Beach Tennis Center
- Location: Delray Beach, Florida; United States
- Capacity: 8,200 (tennis) (stadium)

Construction
- Built: 1992

Tenants
- Delray Beach Open (tennis) (1999-present); Davis Cup: USA vs. Sweden, April 2004; Fed Cup: USA vs. Belgium, April 2005

Delray Beach Tennis Center is a tennis center in Delray Beach, Florida. The center opened in 1974, and added a stadium, built in 1992, that currently holds 8,200 spectators. It currently hosts the Delray Beach Open.

It has hosted Fed Cup and Davis Cup matches.

In 2006, the Palm Beach Phantoms indoor football team planned on playing there, which would have made the Tennis Center the first outdoor facility to host the normally indoor sporting event. However, no agreement was made with the team, which forced the Phantoms to play all of its games on the road. The team folded after the 2006 season with a record of 1–6.

== See also ==
- List of tennis stadiums by capacity
- International Tennis Championships
