= 2001 Davis Cup Asia/Oceania Zone Group II =

One of three zones of regional Davis Cup 2001

The Asia/Oceania Zone was one of the three zones of the regional Davis Cup competition in 2001.

In the Asia/Oceania Zone there were four different tiers, called groups, in which teams compete against each other to advance to the upper tier. Winners in Group II advanced to the Asia/Oceania Zone Group I. Teams who lost their respective ties competed in the relegation play-offs, with winning teams remaining in Group II, whereas teams who lost their play-offs were relegated to the Asia/Oceania Zone Group III in 2002.

== Participating nations ==
- Chinese Taipei
- Hong Kong
- Iran
- Kuwait
- Lebanon
- Malaysia
- Pakistan
- Syria

=== Draw ===
Relegation Play-offs
Mishref, Kuwait (hard)
Kuwait	4
Iran	1
Damascus, Syria (indoor hard)
Syria	0
Pakistan	5

First Round
Kuwait City, Kuwait (hard)
Lebanon	4
Kuwait	1
Causeway Bay, Hong Kong (hard)
Iran	1
Hong Kong	4
Damascus, Syria (indoor hard)
Syria	2
Malaysia	3
Taichung, Taiwan (clay)
Pakistan	2
Chinese Taipei	3

Second Round
Yarze, Lebanon (clay)
Lebanon	3
Hong Kong	2
Kuala Lumpur, Malaysia (indoor hard)
Malaysia	0
Chinese Taipei	5

Third Round
Yarze, Lebanon (clay)
Lebanon	w/o
Chinese Taipei

- Iran and Syria relegated to Group III in 2002.
- Lebanon promoted to Group I in 2002.

== First round ==
=== Kuwait vs. Lebanon ===
Kuwait
1
Yarmouk Sports Club, Kuwait City, Kuwait
9–11 February 2001
Hard

Lebanon
4

			1	2	3	4	5
1	(Kuwait) (Lebanon)	Hussain Al-Ashwak; Jicham Zaatini	0; 6	0; 6	3; 6
2	(Kuwait) (Lebanon)	Mohammad Ghareeb; Ali Hamadeh	4; 6	4; 6	3; 6
3	(Kuwait) (Lebanon)	Mohammed Rashid Al-Foudari / Mohammad Ghareeb; Ali Hamadeh / Jicham Zaatini	5; 7	4; 6	4; 6
4	(Kuwait) (Lebanon)	Hussain Al-Ashwak; Karim Alayli	6; 3	6; 2
5	(Kuwait) (Lebanon)	Adel Al-Shatti; Jad Ayoub	2; 6	6; 3	3; 6

=== Hong Kong vs. Iran ===
Hong Kong
4
Victoria Park, Causeway Bay, Hong Kong
9–11 February 2001
Hard

Iran
1

			1	2	3	4	5
1	(Hong Kong) (Iran)	Michael Brown; Anoosha Shahgholi	6; 1	6^{5} 7^{7}	6; 3	4; 0		retired
2	(Hong Kong) (Iran)	Wayne Wong; Ramin Raziani	6; 2	7^{8} 6^{6}	6^{2} 7^{7}	6; 2
3	(Hong Kong) (Iran)	Michael Brown / John Hui; Ramin Raziani / Seyed Akbar Taheri Rahaghi	6; 4	6; 1	7; 5
4	(Hong Kong) (Iran)	John Hui; Shahab Hassani-Nafez	5; 7	3; 6
5	(Hong Kong) (Iran)	Wayne Wong; Seyed Akbar Taheri Rahaghi	6; 3	7; 5

=== Syria vs. Malaysia ===
Syria
2
Al-Fayhaa Sports Complex, Damascus, Syria
9–11 February 2001
Hard (indoors)

Malaysia
3

			1	2	3	4	5
1	(Syria) (Malaysia)	Samir Saadeldin; Selvam Veerasingam	5; 7	4; 6	6; 2	3; 6
2	(Syria) (Malaysia)	Rabi Bouhassoun; Hazuan Hizan	6; 1	6; 1	4; 6	7^{7} 6^{2}
3	(Syria) (Malaysia)	Rabi Bouhassoun / Lays Salim; Hazuan Hizan / Jamal Darmadi	4; 6	4; 6	2; 6
4	(Syria) (Malaysia)	Rabi Bouhassoun; Selvam Veerasingam	6^{6} 7^{8}	7^{9} 6^{7}	6^{4} 7^{7}	6^{4} 7^{7}
5	(Syria) (Malaysia)	Samir Saadeldin; Mohammed-Rajan Sundera-Karuppiah	6; 0	7; 5

=== Chinese Taipei vs. Pakistan ===
Chinese Taipei
3
Chung-Hsin Tennis Club, Taichung, Taiwan
9–11 February 2001
Clay

Pakistan
2

			1	2	3	4	5
1	(Chinese Taipei) (Pakistan)	Lu Yen-hsun; Aisam-ul-Haq Qureshi	2; 6	3; 6	6; 4	6; 3	1; 6
2	(Chinese Taipei) (Pakistan)	Jimmy Wang; Aqeel Khan	6; 4	6; 2	3; 6	6; 2
3	(Chinese Taipei) (Pakistan)	Cheng Wei-jen / Lu Yen-hsun; Aqeel Khan / Aisam-ul-Haq Qureshi	4; 6	6; 2	4; 6	6^{4} 7^{7}
4	(Chinese Taipei) (Pakistan)	Jimmy Wang; Aisam-ul-Haq Qureshi	6^{3} 7^{7}	6; 2	6; 3	7^{7} 6^{5}
5	(Chinese Taipei) (Pakistan)	Lu Yen-hsun; Aqeel Khan	6; 4	1; 6	6; 3	6; 4

== Second round ==
=== Lebanon vs. Hong Kong ===
Lebanon
3
Yarze, Lebanon
6–8 April 2001
Clay

Hong Kong
2

			1	2	3	4	5
1	(Lebanon) (Hong Kong)	Ali Hamadeh; Melvin Tong	6^{2} 7^{7}	6; 1	6; 4	6; 4
2	(Lebanon) (Hong Kong)	Jicham Zaatini; Michael Brown	7^{9} 6^{7}	6; 3	0; 6	5; 7	6; 8
3	(Lebanon) (Hong Kong)	Ali Hamadeh / Jicham Zaatini; John Hui / Chris Numbers	6; 4	6; 3	7^{8} 6^{6}
4	(Lebanon) (Hong Kong)	Jicham Zaatini; Melvin Tong	6; 1	7^{8} 6^{6}	6; 1
5	(Lebanon) (Hong Kong)	Serge Dakessian; Michael Brown	2; 6	2; 6

=== Malaysia vs. Chinese Taipei ===
Malaysia
0
Kuala Lumpur, Malaysia
6–8 April 2001
Hard (indoors)

Chinese Taipei
5

			1	2	3	4	5
1	(Malaysia) (Chinese Taipei)	Selvam Veerasingam; Lu Yen-hsun	2; 6	1; 6	3; 6
2	(Malaysia) (Chinese Taipei)	Mohammed-Rajan Sundera-Karuppiah; Jimmy Wang	1; 6	6^{4} 7^{7}	0; 5			retired
3	(Malaysia) (Chinese Taipei)	Hazuan Hizan / Jamal Darmadi; Cheng Wei-jen / Lu Yen-hsun	2; 6	1; 6	2; 6
4	(Malaysia) (Chinese Taipei)	Jamal Darmadi; Cheng Wei-jen	5; 7	0; 6
5	(Malaysia) (Chinese Taipei)	Mohammed-Rajan Sundera-Karuppiah; Chang Wen-lung	2; 6	1; 6

== Relegation play-offs ==
=== Kuwait vs. Iran ===
Kuwait
4
Mishref, Kuwait
6–8 April 2001
Hard

Iran
1

			1	2	3	4	5
1	(Kuwait) (Iran)	Hussain Al-Ashwak; Ramin Raziani	5; 7	6^{5} 7^{7}	6; 3	4; 6
2	(Kuwait) (Iran)	Mohammad Ghareeb; Anoosha Shahgholi	6; 1	6; 2	7; 5
3	(Kuwait) (Iran)	Hussain Al-Ashwak / Mohammad Ghareeb; Ramin Raziani / Anoosha Shahgholi	6; 3	7; 5	1; 6	6; 3
4	(Kuwait) (Iran)	Mohammad Ghareeb; Ramin Raziani	6; 4	6; 2	6; 4
5	(Kuwait) (Iran)	Hussain Al-Ashwak; Anoosha Shahgholi	7^{9} 6^{7}	7; 5

=== Syria vs. Pakistan ===
Syria
0
Damascus, Syria
6–8 April 2001
Hard (indoors)

Pakistan
5

			1	2	3	4	5
1	(Syria) (Pakistan)	Samir Saadeldin; Aisam-ul-Haq Qureshi	1; 6	4; 6	3; 6
2	(Syria) (Pakistan)	Rabi Bouhassoun; Aqeel Khan	7^{7} 6^{4}	3; 6	3; 6	6^{5} 7^{7}
3	(Syria) (Pakistan)	Rabi Bouhassoun / Samir Saadeldin; Aqeel Khan / Aisam-ul-Haq Qureshi	2; 6	3; 6	4; 6
4	(Syria) (Pakistan)	Lays Salim; Asim Shafik	3; 6					retired
5	(Syria) (Pakistan)	Yazan Al-Kasim; Nomi Qamar	2; 6	2; 6

== Third round ==
=== Lebanon vs. Chinese Taipei ===
Lebanon defeated Chinese Taipei by walkover. The tie was scheduled to be held at the Country Club in Yarze, Lebanon between 2 and 4 November 2001.
