= 2004 Davis Cup Asia/Oceania Zone Group II =

One of three zones of regional Davis Cup 2004

The Asia/Oceania Zone was one of the three zones of the regional Davis Cup competition in 2004.

In the Asia/Oceania Zone there were four tiers, called groups, in which teams compete against each other to advance to the upper tier. Winners in Group II advanced to the Asia/Oceania Zone Group I. Teams who lost their respective ties competed in the relegation play-offs, with winning teams remaining in Group II, whereas teams who lost their play-offs were relegated to the Asia/Oceania Zone Group III in 2005.

== Participating nations ==
- China
- Hong Kong
- Iran
- Kuwait
- Lebanon
- Malaysia
- Philippines
- South Korea

=== Draw ===
Play-offs
Tehran, Iran (clay)
Malaysia	1
Iran	4
Manila, Philippines (indoor clay)
Philippines	4
2	Hong Kong	1

First Round
Kuala Lumpur, Malaysia (indoor hard)
1	South Korea	5
Malaysia	0
Beirut, Lebanon (indoor carpet)
4	Lebanon	3
Iran	2
Manila, Philippines (indoor clay)
Philippines	1
3	China	4
Causeway Bay, Hong Kong (hard)
2	Hong Kong	1
Kuwait	3

Second Round
Busan, South Korea (hard)
1	South Korea	5
4	Lebanon	0
Nanjing, China (indoor hard)
3	China	5
Kuwait	0

Third Round
Nanjing, China (hard)
1	South Korea	2
3	China	3

- Malaysia and Hong Kong relegated to Group III in 2005.
- China promoted to Group I in 2005.

== First round ==
=== Malaysia vs. South Korea ===
Malaysia
0
National Tennis Centre, Kuala Lumpur, Malaysia
6–8 February 2004
Hard (indoors)

South Korea
5

			1	2	3	4	5
1	(Malaysia) (South Korea)	Dannio Yahya; Lee Hyung-taik	1; 6	0; 6	0; 6
2	(Malaysia) (South Korea)	Si Yew Ming; Chung Hee-seok	3; 6	5; 7	4; 6
3	(Malaysia) (South Korea)	Adam Jaya / Si Yew Ming; Chung Hee-seok / Lee Hyung-taik	7^{7} 6^{5}	2; 6	4; 6	3; 6
4	(Malaysia) (South Korea)	Adam Jaya; Im Kyu-tae	5; 7	4; 6
5	(Malaysia) (South Korea)	Mohammed-Noor Noordin; Nam Hyun-woo	3; 6	1; 6

=== Lebanon vs. Iran ===
Lebanon
3
Jamhour Sports Club Indoor Stadium, Beirut, Lebanon
6–8 February 2004
Carpet (indoors)

Iran
2

			1	2	3	4	5
1	(Lebanon) (Iran)	Will Farah-Lebar; Anoosha Shahgholi	6; 0	7; 5	6; 3
2	(Lebanon) (Iran)	Patrick Chucri; Ashkan Shokoofi	4; 6	1; 6	7; 5	6; 3	6; 4
3	(Lebanon) (Iran)	Patrick Chucri / Will Farah-Lebar; Anoosha Shahgholi / Ashkan Shokoofi	6; 3	6; 4	6; 2
4	(Lebanon) (Iran)	Fadi Youssef; Anoosha Shahgholi	0; 6	6^{3} 7^{7}
5	(Lebanon) (Iran)	Wahib Maknieh; Ashkan Shokoofi	3; 6	7^{7} 6^{5}	1; 6

=== Philippines vs. China ===
Philippines
1
Ynares Socio-Cultural Sports Center, Pasig City, Metro Manila, Philippines
6–8 February 2004
Clay (indoors)

China
4

			1	2	3	4	5
1	(Philippines) (China)	Johnny Arcilla; Lu Hao	5; 7	6; 2	1; 6	6^{3} 7^{7}
2	(Philippines) (China)	Joseph Victorino; Yu Xinyuan	1; 6	2; 6	1; 6
3	(Philippines) (China)	Adelo Abadia / Johnny Arcilla; Xu Ran / Yu Xinyuan	3; 6	1; 6	6; 3	2; 6
4	(Philippines) (China)	Johnny Arcilla; Li Jingyi	6; 2	7; 5
5	(Philippines) (China)	Joseph Victorino; Lu Hao	5; 7	4; 6

=== Hong Kong vs. Kuwait ===
Hong Kong
1
Victoria Park, Causeway Bay, Hong Kong
6–8 February 2004
Hard

Kuwait
3

			1	2	3	4	5
1	(Hong Kong) (Kuwait)	Michael Brown; Mohammad Ghareeb	2; 6	3; 6	1; 6
2	(Hong Kong) (Kuwait)	Yu Hiu Tung; Musaad Al Jazzaf	6; 2	4; 6	4; 6	6; 3	5; 7
3	(Hong Kong) (Kuwait)	John Hui / Brian Hung; Abdullah Maqdes / Ahmad Rabeea Muhammad	6; 3	6; 2	6; 0
4	(Hong Kong) (Kuwait)	Yu Hiu Tung; Mohammad Ghareeb	4; 6	4; 6	2; 6
5	(Hong Kong) (Kuwait)	Michael Brown; Musaad Al Jazzaf						not played

== Second round ==
=== South Korea vs. Lebanon ===
South Korea
5
Geumjeong Tennis Stadium, Busan, South Korea
9–11 April 2004
Hard

Lebanon
0

			1	2	3	4	5
1	(South Korea) (Lebanon)	Chung Hee-seok; Will Farah-Lebar	6; 2	6; 2	6; 1
2	(South Korea) (Lebanon)	Kim Young-jun; Patrick Chucri	7^{7} 6^{5}	7^{7} 6^{4}	6; 1
3	(South Korea) (Lebanon)	Chung Hee-seok / Lee Hyung-taik; Patrick Chucri / Will Farah-Lebar	6; 3	6; 1	6; 4
4	(South Korea) (Lebanon)	Jun Woong-sun; Patrick Chucri	6; 4	7; 5
5	(South Korea) (Lebanon)	Kim Young-jun; Will Farah-Lebar	6; 2	6; 4

=== China vs. Kuwait ===
China
5
Nanjing Sports College Tennis Centre, Nanjing, China
9–11 April 2004
Hard (indoors)

Kuwait
0

			1	2	3	4	5
1	(China) (Kuwait)	Zhu Benqiang; Mohammad-Khaliq Siddiq	6; 0	6; 4	7; 5
2	(China) (Kuwait)	Zeng Shaoxuan; Mohammad Ghareeb	7^{7} 6^{5}	6^{5} 7^{7}				retired
3	(China) (Kuwait)	Zeng Shaoxuan / Zhu Benqiang; Abdullah Maqdes / Mohammad-Khaliq Siddiq	6; 1	6; 3	6; 0
4	(China) (Kuwait)	Yu Xinyuan; Abdullah Maqdes	6; 4	6; 3
5	(China) (Kuwait)	Li Jingyi; Ahmad Rabeea Muhammad	6; 0	6; 3

== Relegation play-offs ==
=== Iran vs. Malaysia ===
Iran
4
Enghelab Sports Complex, Tehran, Iran
9–11 April 2004
Clay

Malaysia
1

			1	2	3	4	5
1	(Iran) (Malaysia)	Shahab Hassani-Nafez; Adam Jaya	6; 1	6; 4	6; 2
2	(Iran) (Malaysia)	Ashkan Shokoofi; Si Yew Ming	4; 6	6^{2} 7^{7}	7; 5	6; 4	6; 4
3	(Iran) (Malaysia)	Ashkan Shokoofi / Farshad Talavar; Adam Jaya / Si Yew Ming	6^{4} 7^{7}	3; 6	5; 7
4	(Iran) (Malaysia)	Shahab Hassani-Nafez; Si Yew Ming	6; 3	3; 6	7^{7} 6^{3}	6; 2
5	(Iran) (Malaysia)	Saeid Ahmadvand; Mohammed-Noor Noordin	6; 0	6; 3

=== Philippines vs. Hong Kong ===
Philippines
4
Ynares Socio-Cultural Sports Centre, Metro Manila, Philippines
9–11 April 2004
Clay (indoors)

Hong Kong
1

			1	2	3	4	5
1	(Philippines) (Hong Kong)	Adelo Abadia; Yu Hiu Tung	6; 2	6; 1	6; 3
2	(Philippines) (Hong Kong)	Johnny Arcilla; Michael Brown	2; 6	6; 1	6; 2	6; 4
3	(Philippines) (Hong Kong)	Adelo Abadia / Johnny Arcilla; John Hui / Asif Ismail	7; 5	6; 2	6; 3
4	(Philippines) (Hong Kong)	Patrick John Tierro; Yu Hiu Tung	6; 4	6; 3
5	(Philippines) (Hong Kong)	Joseph Victorino; Michael Brown	6; 3	3; 6	0; 1			retired

== Third round ==
=== China vs. South Korea ===
China
3
Nanjing Sports College Tennis Centre, Nanjing, China
24–26 September 2004
Hard

South Korea
2

			1	2	3	4	5
1	(China) (South Korea)	Zhu Benqiang; Lee Hyung-taik	4; 6	5; 7	4; 6
2	(China) (South Korea)	Wang Yu; Kim Young-jun	7^{10} 6^{8}	3; 6	4; 6	6; 3	6; 2
3	(China) (South Korea)	Zeng Shaoxuan / Zhu Benqiang; Chung Hee-seok / Lee Hyung-taik	4; 6	3; 6	7^{7} 6^{4}	6; 3	6; 4
4	(China) (South Korea)	Wang Yu; Lee Hyung-taik	2; 6	3; 6	3; 6
5	(China) (South Korea)	Zhu Benqiang; Kim Young-jun	5; 7	6^{3} 7^{7}	6; 1	7; 5	6; 3
