= 1997 Davis Cup Asia/Oceania Zone Group II =

International tennis competition

The Asia/Oceania Zone was one of the three zones of the regional Davis Cup competition in 1997.

In the Asia/Oceania Zone there were four different tiers, called groups, in which teams compete against each other to advance to the upper tier. Winners in Group II advanced to the Asia/Oceania Zone Group I. Teams who lost their respective ties competed in the relegation play-offs, with winning teams remaining in Group II, whereas teams who lost their play-offs were relegated to the Asia/Oceania Zone Group III in 1998.

== Participating nations ==
- Chinese Taipei
- Hong Kong
- Iran
- Lebanon
- Pakistan
- Saudi Arabia
- Singapore
- Thailand

=== Draw ===
Relegation Play-offs
Islamabad, Pakistan (clay)
Singapore	0
Pakistan	5
Riyadh, Saudi Arabia (hard)
Saudi Arabia	1
Hong Kong	4

First Round
Taipei, Taiwan (indoor hard)
Chinese Taipei	5
Singapore	0
Islamabad, Pakistan (clay)
Pakistan	2
Iran	3
Riyadh, Saudi Arabia (hard)
Lebanon	5
Saudi Arabia	0
Causeway Bay, Hong Kong (hard)
Hong Kong	0
Thailand	5

Second Round
Tehran, Iran (clay)
Chinese Taipei	1
Iran	4
Beirut, Lebanon (indoor hard)
Lebanon	5
Thailand	0

Third Round
Beirut, Lebanon (indoor hard)
Iran	1
Lebanon	4

- Singapore and Saudi Arabia relegated to Group III in 1998.
- Lebanon promoted to Group I in 1998.

== First round ==
=== Chinese Taipei vs. Singapore ===
Chinese Taipei
5
Royal Ball Bay Club, Taipei, Taiwan
21–23 February 1997
Hard (indoors)

Singapore
0

			1	2	3	4	5
1	(Chinese Taipei) (Singapore)	Lien Yu-hui; Chen Chee-yen	6; 2	6; 0	6; 0
2	(Chinese Taipei) (Singapore)	Tsai Chia-yen; Ho Kuen-yiep	6; 2	6; 1	6; 4
3	(Chinese Taipei) (Singapore)	Chiang Jinn-yen / Lien Yu-hui; Ho Kuen-yiep / Kho Tung-yi	6; 2	6; 3	6; 2
4	(Chinese Taipei) (Singapore)	Tsai Chia-yen; Chen Chee-yen	6; 2	6; 2
5	(Chinese Taipei) (Singapore)	Lien Yu-hui; Tan Ee-wei	6; 1	6; 0

=== Pakistan vs. Iran ===
Pakistan
2
National Stadium, Islamabad, Pakistan
21–23 February 1997
Clay

Iran
3

			1	2	3	4	5
1	(Pakistan) (Iran)	Omer Rashid; Mansour Bahrami	3; 6	4; 6	6; 0	4; 6
2	(Pakistan) (Iran)	Hamed-ul-Haq; Mohammed-Reza Tavakoli	7^{7} 6^{2}	3; 6	6; 2	6; 4
3	(Pakistan) (Iran)	Omer Rashid / Asim Shafik; Mansour Bahrami / Ramin Raziani	3; 6	5; 7	6^{3} 7^{7}
4	(Pakistan) (Iran)	Omer Rashid; Ramin Raziani	6; 4	3; 6	2; 6	4; 6
5	(Pakistan) (Iran)	Hamed-ul-Haq; Mansour Bahrami	1; 6	6; 4	6; 2

=== Saudi Arabia vs. Lebanon ===
Saudi Arabia
0
National Stadium, Riyadh, Saudi Arabia
18–20 February 1997
Hard

Lebanon
5

			1	2	3	4	5
1	(Saudi Arabia) (Lebanon)	Othman Al-Anazi; Ali Hamadeh	1; 6	2; 6	4; 6
2	(Saudi Arabia) (Lebanon)	Bader Mohammed Almuqail; Sean Karam	4; 6	3; 6	4; 6
3	(Saudi Arabia) (Lebanon)	Othman Al-Anazi / Bader Mohammed Almuqail; Ali Hamadeh / Sean Karam	4; 6	1; 6	3; 6
4	(Saudi Arabia) (Lebanon)	Bader Mohammed Almuqail; Ali Hamadeh	0; 6	1; 6
5	(Saudi Arabia) (Lebanon)	Tawfiq Moafa; Toufiq Zhalan	5; 7	3; 6

=== Hong Kong vs. Thailand ===
Hong Kong
0
Victoria Park, Causeway Bay, Hong Kong
14–16 February 1997
Hard

Thailand
5

			1	2	3	4	5
1	(Hong Kong) (Thailand)	Mark Ferreira; Woraphol Thongkhamchu	3; 6	2; 6	0; 6
2	(Hong Kong) (Thailand)	Melvin Tong; Vittaya Samrej	3; 6	7; 5	2; 6	6; 2	4; 6
3	(Hong Kong) (Thailand)	Mark Ferreira / Graeme Foster; Narathorn Srichaphan / Tanakorn Srichaphan	1; 6	2; 6	3; 6
4	(Hong Kong) (Thailand)	Mark Ferreira; Vittaya Samrej	2; 6	2; 6
5	(Hong Kong) (Thailand)	Wayne Wong; Woraphol Thongkhamchu	3; 6	6^{2} 7^{7}

== Second round ==
=== Iran vs. Chinese Taipei ===
Iran
4
Enghelab Sport Complex, Tehran, Iran
4–6 April 1997
Clay

Chinese Taipei
1

			1	2	3	4	5
1	(Iran) (Chinese Taipei)	Ramin Raziani; Lien Yu-hui	4; 6	2; 6	7^{7} 6^{5}	6; 4	6; 3
2	(Iran) (Chinese Taipei)	Mansour Bahrami; Chen Chih-jung	7; 5	7^{7} 6^{3}	3; 6	6; 3
3	(Iran) (Chinese Taipei)	Mansour Bahrami / Ramin Raziani; Chen Chih-jung / Lien Yu-hui	6; 4	7^{8} 6^{6}	7^{7} 6^{4}
4	(Iran) (Chinese Taipei)	Ramin Raziani; Chen Chih-jung	0; 2					retired
5	(Iran) (Chinese Taipei)	Mansour Bahrami; Tsai Chia-yen	6; 0	7^{7} 6^{2}

=== Lebanon vs. Thailand ===
Lebanon
5
E.D.L. Club, Beirut, Lebanon
4–6 April 1997
Hard (indoors)

Thailand
0

			1	2	3	4	5
1	(Lebanon) (Thailand)	Jicham Zaatini; Vittaya Samrej	3; 6	6; 3	6; 3	6; 2
2	(Lebanon) (Thailand)	Ali Hamadeh; Narathorn Srichaphan	7^{7} 6^{5}	7; 5	7^{7} 6^{4}
3	(Lebanon) (Thailand)	Ali Hamadeh / Jicham Zaatini; Narathorn Srichaphan / Tanakorn Srichaphan	6; 4	3; 6	7^{7} 6^{2}	6; 4
4	(Lebanon) (Thailand)	Ali Hamadeh; Vittaya Samrej	6; 3	3; 6	7^{7} 6^{5}
5	(Lebanon) (Thailand)	Jicham Zaatini; Tanakorn Srichaphan	6; 4	6; 1

== Relegation play-offs ==
=== Pakistan vs. Singapore ===
Pakistan
5
National Stadium, Islamabad, Pakistan
4–6 April 1997
Clay

Singapore
0

			1	2	3	4	5
1	(Pakistan) (Singapore)	Omer Rashid; Ho Kuen-yiep	6; 3	6; 0	7; 5
2	(Pakistan) (Singapore)	Hamed-ul-Haq; Lim Yang-tat	6; 4	6; 2	6; 1
3	(Pakistan) (Singapore)	Omer Rashid / Hamed-ul-Haq; Ho Kuen-yiep / Lim Yang-tat	6; 3	6; 3	6; 2
4	(Pakistan) (Singapore)	Asim Shafik; Lim Yang-tat	6; 1	6; 4
5	(Pakistan) (Singapore)	Syed-Nasir Sherazi; Jensen Hiu	6; 1	6; 3

=== Saudi Arabia vs. Hong Kong ===
Saudi Arabia
1
National Stadium, Riyadh, Saudi Arabia
4–6 April 1997
Hard

Hong Kong
4

			1	2	3	4	5
1	(Saudi Arabia) (Hong Kong)	Bader Mohammed Almuqail; Wayne Wong	6; 4	7^{7} 6^{5}	6; 3
2	(Saudi Arabia) (Hong Kong)	Farah Al-Somali; Melvin Tong	2; 6	0; 6	0; 6
3	(Saudi Arabia) (Hong Kong)	Tawfik Al-Ibrahim / Bader Mohammed Almuqail; Mark Ferreira / Melvin Tong	0; 6	1; 6	4; 6
4	(Saudi Arabia) (Hong Kong)	Bader Mohammed Almuqail; Melvin Tong	5; 7	2; 6	3; 6
5	(Saudi Arabia) (Hong Kong)	Tawfiq Moafa; Wayne Wong	2; 6	3; 6

== Third round ==
=== Lebanon vs. Iran ===
Lebanon
4
E.D.L. Club, Beirut, Lebanon
19–21 September 1997
Hard (indoors)

Iran
1

			1	2	3	4	5
1	(Lebanon) (Iran)	Ali Hamadeh; Reza Nakhai	6; 3	7; 5	6; 4
2	(Lebanon) (Iran)	Jicham Zaatini; Mohammed-Reza Tavakoli	6; 2	6; 1	6; 3
3	(Lebanon) (Iran)	Ali Hamadeh / Jicham Zaatini; Reza Nakhai / Seyed Akbar Taheri Rahaghi	6; 4	6; 4	6; 3
4	(Lebanon) (Iran)	Jicham Zaatini; Reza Nakhai	7^{7} 6^{3}	6; 3
5	(Lebanon) (Iran)	Toufiq Zhalan; Mohammed-Reza Tavakoli	2; 6	4; 6
