= 2003 Davis Cup Asia/Oceania Zone Group II =

One of three zones of regional Davis Cup 2003

The Asia/Oceania Zone was one of the three zones of the regional Davis Cup competition in 2003.

In the Asia/Oceania Zone there were four different tiers, called groups, in which teams compete against each other to advance to the upper tier. Winners in Group II advanced to the Asia/Oceania Zone Group I. Teams who lost their respective ties competed in the relegation play-offs, with winning teams remaining in Group II, whereas teams who lost their play-offs were relegated to the Asia/Oceania Zone Group III in 2004.

== Participating nations ==
- China
- Chinese Taipei
- Hong Kong
- Iran
- Kazakhstan
- Lebanon
- Philippines
- Tajikistan

=== Draw ===
Play-offs
Dushanbe, Tajikistan (clay)
Iran	5
Tajikistan	0
Manila, Philippines (indoor clay)
Kazakhstan	2
Philippines	3

First Round
Tehran, Iran (indoor clay)
1	Lebanon	3
Iran	2
Causeway Bay, Hong Kong (hard)
4	Hong Kong	4
Tajikistan	1
Taipei, Chinese Taipei (carpet)
Kazakhstan	1
3	Chinese Taipei	4
Wuhan, China (indoor hard)
Philippines	0
2	China	3

Second Round
Colombo, Sri Lanka (hard)
1	Lebanon	1
4	Hong Kong	3
Wuhan, China (hard)
3	Chinese Taipei	3
2	China	2

Third Round
Kaohsiung, Chinese Taipei (hard)
4	Hong Kong	1
3	Chinese Taipei	4

- Tajikistan and Kazakhstan relegated to Group III in 2004.
- Chinese Taipei promoted to Group I in 2004.

== First round ==
=== Iran vs. Lebanon ===
Iran
2
Shihad Shiroodi Stadium, Tehran, Iran
7–9 February 2003
Clay (indoors)

Lebanon
3

			1	2	3	4	5
1	(Iran) (Lebanon)	Ashkan Shokoofi; Jicham Zaatini	3; 6	6; 3	6; 4	6; 1
2	(Iran) (Lebanon)	Seyed Akbar Taheri Rahaghi; Patrick Chucri	5; 7	3; 6	1; 6
3	(Iran) (Lebanon)	Ashkan Shokoofi / Seyed Akbar Taheri Rahaghi; Patrick Chucri / Jicham Zaatini	5; 7	3; 6	6^{4} 7^{7}
4	(Iran) (Lebanon)	Anoosha Shahgholi; Jicham Zaatini	1; 6	6; 4	6; 3	3; 6	6; 1
5	(Iran) (Lebanon)	Ashkan Shokoofi; Patrick Chucri	4; 6	7; 5	4; 6	6; 1	5; 7

=== Hong Kong vs. Tajikistan ===
Hong Kong
4
Victoria Park, Causeway Bay, Hong Kong
7–9 February 2003
Hard

Tajikistan
1

			1	2	3	4	5
1	(Hong Kong) (Tajikistan)	Asif Ismail; Dilshod Sharifi	6; 0	6; 0	6; 3
2	(Hong Kong) (Tajikistan)	Yu Hiu Tung; Sergey Makashin	5; 7	6; 2	6; 4	6; 3
3	(Hong Kong) (Tajikistan)	John Hui / Asif Ismail; Sergey Makashin / Dilshod Sharifi	6; 1	6; 1	6; 2
4	(Hong Kong) (Tajikistan)	Asif Ismail; Sergey Makashin	6^{4} 7^{7}	6; 2	6^{5} 7^{7}
5	(Hong Kong) (Tajikistan)	Yu Hiu Tung; Dilshod Sharifi	6; 1	6; 1

=== Chinese Taipei vs. Kazakhstan ===
Chinese Taipei
4
Taipei Physical Education College Gymnasium, Taipei, Chinese Taipei
7–9 February 2003
Carpet (indoors)

Kazakhstan
1

			1	2	3	4	5
1	(Chinese Taipei) (Kazakhstan)	Lu Yen-hsun; Dias Doskarayev	7; 5	6; 0	7; 5
2	(Chinese Taipei) (Kazakhstan)	Jimmy Wang; Alexey Kedryuk	6; 4	6; 1	6; 2
3	(Chinese Taipei) (Kazakhstan)	Lu Yen-hsun / Jimmy Wang; Dias Doskarayev / Alexey Kedryuk	6; 1	6; 1	6; 1
4	(Chinese Taipei) (Kazakhstan)	Lu Yen-hsun; Alexey Kedryuk	3; 6	1; 6
5	(Chinese Taipei) (Kazakhstan)	Cheng Wei-jen; Anton Tsymbalov	6; 3	6; 0

=== China vs. Philippines ===
China
3
Wuhan Xinhualu Sports Centre Tennis Club, Wuhan, China
14–16 February 2003
Hard (indoors)

Philippines
0

			1	2	3	4	5
1	(China) (Philippines)	Zeng Shaoxuan; Johnny Arcilla	6; 2	6; 1	6; 3
2	(China) (Philippines)	Zhu Benqiang; Joseph Victorino	6; 0	6; 0	6; 1
3	(China) (Philippines)	Xu Ran / Zeng Shaoxuan; Johnny Arcilla / Michael Mora	6; 2	6; 1	6; 3
4	(China) (Philippines)	Zhu Benqiang; Johnny Arcilla						not played
5	(China) (Philippines)	Zeng Shaoxuan; Joseph Victorino						not played

== Second round ==
=== Lebanon vs. Hong Kong ===
Lebanon
1
National Tennis Centre, Colombo, Sri Lanka
20–22 June 2003
Hard

Hong Kong
3

			1	2	3	4	5
1	(Lebanon) (Hong Kong)	Patrick Chucri; Yu Hiu Tung	6; 2	1; 6	6; 4	3; 0		retired
2	(Lebanon) (Hong Kong)	Karim Alayli; Wayne Wong	1; 6	6; 1	5; 7	3; 6
3	(Lebanon) (Hong Kong)	Karim Alayli / Patrick Chucri; Brian Hung / Lu Ling	1; 6	3; 6	4; 6
4	(Lebanon) (Hong Kong)	Patrick Chucri; Wayne Wong	7; 5	6; 3	5; 7	4; 6	3; 6
5	(Lebanon) (Hong Kong)	Karim Alayli; Yu Hiu Tung						not played

=== China vs. Chinese Taipei ===
China
2
Wuhan Xinhua Sports Centre Tennis Club, Wuhan, China
4–6 April 2003
Hard

Chinese Taipei
3

			1	2	3	4	5
1	(China) (Chinese Taipei)	Sun Peng; Lu Yen-hsun	4; 6	3; 6	6; 4	7; 5	4; 6
2	(China) (Chinese Taipei)	Zhu Benqiang; Jimmy Wang	7^{7} 6^{2}	6^{8} 7^{10}	6; 1	6; 1
3	(China) (Chinese Taipei)	Xu Ran / Zeng Shaoxuan; Lu Yen-hsun / Jimmy Wang	6; 4	4; 6	0; 6	3; 6
4	(China) (Chinese Taipei)	Zhu Benqiang; Lu Yen-hsun	6; 2	6; 1				retired
5	(China) (Chinese Taipei)	Zeng Shaoxuan; Jimmy Wang	3; 6	4; 6	2; 6

== Relegation play-offs ==
=== Tajikistan vs. Iran ===
Tajikistan
0
Dushanbe Central Stadium, Dushanbe, Tajikistan
4–6 April 2003
Clay

Iran
5

			1	2	3	4	5
1	(Tajikistan) (Iran)	Mansur Yakhyaev; Anoosha Shahgholi	7; 5	6^{4} 7^{7}	3; 6	4; 6
2	(Tajikistan) (Iran)	Sergey Makashin; Ashkan Shokoofi	6^{1} 7^{7}	6; 1	4; 6	3; 6
3	(Tajikistan) (Iran)	Sergey Makashin / Mansur Yakhyaev; Anoosha Shahgholi / Seyed Akbar Taheri Rahaghi	6; 3	3; 6	5; 7	6; 2	4; 6
4	(Tajikistan) (Iran)	Dilshod Sharifi; Shahab Hassani-Nafez	3; 6	3; 6
5	(Tajikistan) (Iran)	Aziz Avganov; Ashkan Shokoofi	4; 6	1; 6

=== Philippines vs. Kazakhstan ===
Philippines
3
Philippine Columbian Association, Manila, Philippines
4–6 April 2003
Clay (indoors)

Kazakhstan
2

			1	2	3	4	5
1	(Philippines) (Kazakhstan)	Joseph Victorino; Anton Tsymbalov	6; 4	6; 4	6; 4
2	(Philippines) (Kazakhstan)	Johnny Arcilla; Alexey Kedryuk	3; 6	4; 6	6; 2	7; 5	6; 2
3	(Philippines) (Kazakhstan)	Johnny Arcilla / Michael Mora; Alexey Kedryuk / Anton Tsymbalov	4; 6	7; 5	6; 3	5; 7	6; 4
4	(Philippines) (Kazakhstan)	Joseph Victorino; Alexey Kedryuk	5; 7	6^{7} 7^{9}
5	(Philippines) (Kazakhstan)	Rolando Ruel; Anton Tsymbalov	2; 6	3; 6

== Third round ==
=== Chinese Taipei vs. Hong Kong ===
Chinese Taipei
4
Yang-Ming Tennis Center, Kaohsiung, Chinese Taipei
19–21 September 2003
Hard

Hong Kong
1

			1	2	3	4	5
1	(Chinese Taipei) (Hong Kong)	Jimmy Wang; Yu Hiu Tung	6; 0	6; 4	6; 1
2	(Chinese Taipei) (Hong Kong)	Lu Yen-hsun; Wayne Wong	6; 4	6; 1	6; 3
3	(Chinese Taipei) (Hong Kong)	Lu Yen-hsun / Jimmy Wang; John Hui / Brian Hung	6; 3	6; 2	6; 4
4	(Chinese Taipei) (Hong Kong)	Chen Ti; Yu Hiu Tung	6; 4	6; 0
5	(Chinese Taipei) (Hong Kong)	Cheng Wei-jen; Wayne Wong	1; 6	2; 6
