= 2002 Davis Cup Asia/Oceania Zone Group II =

One of three zones of regional Davis Cup 2002

The Asia/Oceania Zone was one of the three zones of the regional Davis Cup competition in 2002.

In the Asia/Oceania Zone there were four different tiers, called groups, in which teams compete against each other to advance to the upper tier. Winners in Group II advanced to the Asia/Oceania Zone Group I. Teams who lost their respective ties competed in the relegation play-offs, with winning teams remaining in Group II, whereas teams who lost their play-offs were relegated to the Asia/Oceania Zone Group III in 2003.

== Participating nations ==
- China
- Chinese Taipei
- Hong Kong
- Kazakhstan
- Kuwait
- Malaysia
- Pakistan
- Philippines

=== Draw ===
Play-offs
Manila, Philippines (indoor clay)
Kuwait	2
Philippines	3
Causeway Bay, Hong Kong (indoor hard)
Malaysia	0
Hong Kong	5

First Round
Shenzhen, China (hard)
1	China	4
Kuwait	1
Almaty, Kazakhstan (indoor hard)
Kazakhstan	4
Philippines	1
Kuala Lumpur, Malaysia (indoor hard)
Pakistan	4
Malaysia	1
Causeway Bay, Hong Kong (outdoor hard)
Hong Kong	1
2	Chinese Taipei	4

Second Round
Wuhan, China (hard)
1	China	3
Kazakhstan	2
Lahore, Pakistan (grass)
Pakistan	4
2	Chinese Taipei	1

Third Round
Peshawar, Pakistan (grass)
1	China	2
Pakistan	3

- Kuwait and Malaysia relegated to Group III in 2003.
- Pakistan promoted to Group I in 2003.

== First round ==
=== China vs. Kuwait ===
China
4
Shenzhen, China
8–10 February 2002
Hard

Kuwait
1

			1	2	3	4	5
1	(China) (Kuwait)	Zhu Benqiang; Musaad Al Jazzaf	6; 0	6; 0	6; 0
2	(China) (Kuwait)	Wang Yu; Mohammad Ghareeb	3; 6	5; 7	4; 6
3	(China) (Kuwait)	Xu Ran / Zeng Shaoxuan; Hussain Al-Ashwak / Mohammad Ghareeb	6; 0	6; 3	6; 4
4	(China) (Kuwait)	Zhu Benqiang; Hussain Al-Ashwak	6; 1	6; 1	6; 1
5	(China) (Kuwait)	Wang Yu; Musaad Al Jazzaf	7; 5	6; 1

=== Kazakhstan vs. Philippines ===
Kazakhstan
4
Almaty, Kazakhstan
8–10 February 2002
Hard (indoors)

Philippines
1

			1	2	3	4	5
1	(Kazakhstan) (Philippines)	Dias Doskarayev; Joseph Victorino	4; 6	6; 4	6; 3	6; 0
2	(Kazakhstan) (Philippines)	Alexey Kedryuk; Johnny Arcilla	6; 2	6; 2	4; 6	6; 3
3	(Kazakhstan) (Philippines)	Dias Doskarayev / Alexey Kedryuk; Adelo Abadia / Johnny Arcilla	3; 6	4; 6	6; 3	7^{7} 6^{5}	9; 7
4	(Kazakhstan) (Philippines)	Anton Tsymbalov; Joseph Victorino	6; 2	3; 6	7; 5
5	(Kazakhstan) (Philippines)	Dmitriy Makeyev; Michael Mora	6^{2} 7^{7}	4; 6

=== Malaysia vs. Pakistan ===
Malaysia
1
Kuala Lumpur, Malaysia
8–10 February 2002
Hard (indoors)

Pakistan
4

			1	2	3	4	5
1	(Malaysia) (Pakistan)	Hazuan Hizan; Asim Shafik	3; 6	6; 4	1; 6	4; 6
2	(Malaysia) (Pakistan)	Si Yew Ming; Aisam Qureshi	6^{6} 7^{8}	6^{2} 7^{7}	7^{7} 6^{3}	2; 6
3	(Malaysia) (Pakistan)	Jamal Darmadi / Si Yew Ming; Aqeel Khan / Aisam Qureshi	3; 6	2; 6	7; 5	2; 6
4	(Malaysia) (Pakistan)	Adam Jaya; Nomi Qamar	3; 6	2; 6
5	(Malaysia) (Pakistan)	Si Yew Ming; Asim Shafik	6^{10} 7^{12}	7^{7} 6^{4}	6; 4

=== Hong Kong vs. Chinese Taipei ===
Hong Kong
1
Causeway Bay, Hong Kong
8–10 February 2002
Hard

Chinese Taipei
4

			1	2	3	4	5
1	(Hong Kong) (Chinese Taipei)	Michael Brown; Cheng Wei-jen	4; 6	6; 1	7^{7} 6^{4}	6; 1
2	(Hong Kong) (Chinese Taipei)	Chris Numbers; Jimmy Wang	1; 6	2; 6	4; 6
3	(Hong Kong) (Chinese Taipei)	John Hui / Melvin Tong; Liu Chia-che / Jimmy Wang	1; 6	2; 6	6; 3	1; 6
4	(Hong Kong) (Chinese Taipei)	Michael Brown; Jimmy Wang	1; 6	6; 3	4; 6	2; 6
5	(Hong Kong) (Chinese Taipei)	John Hui; Cheng Wei-jen	2; 6	6^{5} 7^{7}

== Second round ==
=== China vs. Kazakhstan ===
China
3
Chongren Road Sports Centre, Wuhan, China
5–7 April 2002
Hard

Kazakhstan
2

			1	2	3	4	5
1	(China) (Kazakhstan)	Wang Yu; Alexey Kedryuk	3; 6	2; 6	7^{7} 6^{4}	6; 2	0; 6
2	(China) (Kazakhstan)	Zhu Benqiang; Dias Doskarayev	6; 2	3; 6	3; 6	4; 6
3	(China) (Kazakhstan)	Xu Ran / Zeng Shaoxuan; Dias Doskarayev / Alexey Kedryuk	6; 4	6; 0	7^{7} 6^{1}
4	(China) (Kazakhstan)	Zhu Benqiang; Alexey Kedryuk	3; 6	7^{7} 6^{3}	6; 2	4; 6	6; 1
5	(China) (Kazakhstan)	Wang Yu; Dias Doskarayev	6; 4	6; 3	6; 1

=== Pakistan vs. Chinese Taipei ===
Pakistan
4
Punjab Tennis Centre, Lahore, Pakistan
5–7 April 2002
Grass

Chinese Taipei
1

			1	2	3	4	5
1	(Pakistan) (Chinese Taipei)	Aqeel Khan; Cheng Wei-jen	4; 6	6; 3	6; 3	6; 0
2	(Pakistan) (Chinese Taipei)	Aisam Qureshi; Chang Wen-lung	7^{7} 6^{5}	6; 3				retired
3	(Pakistan) (Chinese Taipei)	Aqeel Khan / Aisam Qureshi; Liu Chia-che / Simon Shen	6; 4	2; 6	6; 4	6; 4
4	(Pakistan) (Chinese Taipei)	Aisam Qureshi; Cheng Wei-jen	6; 2	6; 1
5	(Pakistan) (Chinese Taipei)	Asim Shafik; Simon Shen	5; 7	2; 6

== Relegation play-offs ==
=== Philippines vs. Kuwait ===
Philippines
3
Philippine-Columbian Association, Paco, Manila, Philippines
5–7 April 2002
Clay (indoors)

Kuwait
2

			1	2	3	4	5
1	(Philippines) (Kuwait)	Johnny Arcilla; Musaad Al Jazzaf	7^{7} 6^{4}	5; 7	6; 1	6; 4
2	(Philippines) (Kuwait)	Adelo Abadia; Mohammad Ghareeb	5; 7	3; 6	5; 7
3	(Philippines) (Kuwait)	Adelo Abadia / Johnny Arcilla; Hussain Al-Ashwak / Mohammad Ghareeb	4; 6	6; 3	7^{7} 6^{4}	6; 1
4	(Philippines) (Kuwait)	Johnny Arcilla; Mohammad Ghareeb	0; 6	3; 6	2; 6
5	(Philippines) (Kuwait)	Adelo Abadia; Musaad Al Jazzaf	6; 3	6; 2	6; 1

=== Hong Kong vs. Malaysia ===
Hong Kong
5
Victoria Park, Causeway Bay, Hong Kong
5–7 April 2002
Hard (indoors)

Malaysia
0

			1	2	3	4	5
1	(Hong Kong) (Malaysia)	Michael Brown; Si Yew Ming	6; 3	6; 4	7; 5
2	(Hong Kong) (Malaysia)	John Hui; Hazuan Hizan	6; 2	6; 3	1; 6	7; 5
3	(Hong Kong) (Malaysia)	John Hui / Melvin Tong; Adam Jaya / Si Yew Ming	3; 6	6; 4	7^{7} 6^{3}	6; 3
4	(Hong Kong) (Malaysia)	Yu Hiu Tung; Adam Jaya	5; 7	6; 3	6; 0
5	(Hong Kong) (Malaysia)	Michael Brown; Dannio Yahya	6; 0	7; 5

== Third round ==
=== Pakistan vs. China ===
Pakistan
3
Peshawar Club, Peshawar, Pakistan
20–22 September 2002
Grass

China
2

			1	2	3	4	5
1	(Pakistan) (China)	Aqeel Khan; Zhu Benqiang	1; 6	1; 6	7^{7} 6^{5}	6^{2} 7^{7}
2	(Pakistan) (China)	Aisam Qureshi; Wang Yu	6; 2	6; 3	6; 2
3	(Pakistan) (China)	Aqeel Khan / Aisam Qureshi; Xu Ran / Zeng Shaoxuan	6^{3} 7^{7}	7; 5	3; 6	7^{9} 6^{7}	12; 10
4	(Pakistan) (China)	Aisam Qureshi; Zhu Benqiang	6; 4	6; 4	3; 6	1; 6	1; 6
5	(Pakistan) (China)	Aqeel Khan; Wang Yu	6; 1	6; 4	7; 5
