= 2002 Davis Cup Asia/Oceania Zone Group III =

International tennis competition

The Group III tournament was held April 10–14, in Tehran, Iran, on outdoor clay courts.

== Format ==
The eight teams were split into two groups and played in a round-robin format. The top two teams of each group advanced to the promotion pool, from which the two top teams were promoted to the Asia/Oceania Zone Group II in 2003. The bottom two teams of each group were placed in the relegation pool, from which the two bottom teams were demoted to the Asia/Oceania Zone Group IV in 2003.

== Pool A ==
Team	Pld	W	L	MF	MA
Iran	3	3	0	9	0
United Arab Emirates	3	2	1	5	4
Qatar	3	1	2	4	5
Singapore	3	0	3	0	9

=== Iran vs. Qatar ===
Iran
3
Enghelab Club, Tehran, Iran
10 April 2002

Qatar
0

			1	2	3
1	(Iran) (Qatar)	Anoosha Shahgholi; Sultan Khalfan Al Alawi	6; 2	7; 5
2	(Iran) (Qatar)	Seyed Akbar Taheri Rahaghi; Nasser Ghanim Al Khulaifi	6; 2	6; 1
3	(Iran) (Qatar)	Ashkan Shokoofi / Seyed Akbar Taheri Rahaghi; Mohammed-Saadon Al Kawari / Mohammed-Ali Al Saoud	6; 2	6; 2

=== United Arab Emirates vs. Singapore ===
United Arab Emirates
3
Enghelab Club, Tehran, Iran
10 April 2002

Singapore
0

			1	2	3
1	(United Arab Emirates) (Singapore)	Mahmoud Nader Al Blooshi; Jensen Hiu	7^{7} 6^{3}	5; 7	8; 6
2	(United Arab Emirates) (Singapore)	Omar Alawadhi; Jonathan Kam	7; 5	6; 2
3	(United Arab Emirates) (Singapore)	Omar Alawadhi / Mahmoud Nader Al Blooshi; Kok-Huen Kam / Jonathan Kam	7; 5	5; 7	6; 2

=== Iran vs. United Arab Emirates ===
Iran
3
Enghelab Club, Tehran, Iran
11 April 2002

United Arab Emirates
0

			1	2	3
1	(Iran) (United Arab Emirates)	Shahab Hassani-Nafez; Mahmoud Nader Al Blooshi	6; 3	6; 2
2	(Iran) (United Arab Emirates)	Anoosha Shahgholi; Omar Alawadhi	6^{5} 7^{7}	6; 2	6; 0
3	(Iran) (United Arab Emirates)	Ashkan Shokoofi / Seyed Akbar Taheri Rahaghi; Omar Alawadhi / Mahmoud Nader Al Blooshi	6; 1	6; 2

=== Qatar vs. Singapore ===
Qatar
3
Enghelab Club, Tehran, Iran
11 April 2002

Singapore
0

			1	2	3
1	(Qatar) (Singapore)	Sultan Khalfan Al Alawi; Jensen Hiu	6; 0	6; 1
2	(Qatar) (Singapore)	Nasser Ghanim Al Khulaifi; Kok-Huen Kam	6; 3	6; 2
3	(Qatar) (Singapore)	Mohammed-Saadon Al Kawari / Mohammed-Ali Al Saoud; Jensen Hiu / Kok-Huen Kam	6^{2} 7^{7}	7; 5	9; 7

=== Iran vs. Singapore ===
Iran
3
Enghelab Club, Tehran, Iran
12 April 2002

Singapore
0

			1	2	3
1	(Iran) (Singapore)	Shahab Hassani-Nafez; Kok-Huen Kam	6; 4	6; 1
2	(Iran) (Singapore)	Seyed Akbar Taheri Rahaghi; Jonathan Kam	6; 0	6; 0
3	(Iran) (Singapore)	Anoosha Shahgholi / Ashkan Shokoofi; Kok-Huen Kam / Jonathan Kam	6; 2	6; 1

=== United Arab Emirates vs. Qatar ===
United Arab Emirates
2
Enghelab Club, Tehran, Iran
12 April 2002

Qatar
1

			1	2	3
1	(United Arab Emirates) (Qatar)	Mahmoud Nader Al Blooshi; Sultan Khalfan Al Alawi	2; 6	0; 6
2	(United Arab Emirates) (Qatar)	Omar Alawadhi; Nasser Ghanim Al Khulaifi	4; 6	6; 4	6; 2
3	(United Arab Emirates) (Qatar)	Omar Alawadhi / Mahmoud Nader Al Blooshi; Sultan Khalfan Al Alawi / Nasser Ghanim Al Khulaifi	6; 3	6; 3

== Pool B ==
Team	Pld	W	L	MF	MA
Tajikistan	3	3	0	6	3
Pacific Oceania	3	2	1	5	4
Syria	3	1	2	4	5
Saudi Arabia	3	0	3	3	6

=== Syria vs. Tajikistan ===
Syria
1
Enghelab Club, Tehran, Iran
10 April 2002

Tajikistan
2

			1	2	3
1	(Syria) (Tajikistan)	Lays Salim; Mansur Yakhyaev	3; 6	2; 6
2	(Syria) (Tajikistan)	Rabi Bouhassoun; Sergey Makashin	6; 3	6; 3
3	(Syria) (Tajikistan)	Rabi Bouhassoun / Lays Salim; Sergey Makashin / Mansur Yakhyaev	4; 6	5; 7

=== Saudi Arabia vs. Pacific Oceania ===
Saudi Arabia
1
Enghelab Club, Tehran, Iran
10 April 2002

Pacific Oceania
2

			1	2	3
1	(Saudi Arabia) (Pacific Oceania)	Bader Mohammed Almuqail; Leon So'Onalole	6; 4	5; 7	8; 10
2	(Saudi Arabia) (Pacific Oceania)	Omar Althagib; Brett Baudinet	6^{6} 7^{8}	6; 4	7; 5
3	(Saudi Arabia) (Pacific Oceania)	Baqer Abu Khulaif / Bader Mohammed Almuqail; Brett Baudinet / Juan Sebastien Langton	6; 2	3; 6	12; 14

=== Syria vs. Saudi Arabia ===
Syria
2
Enghelab Club, Tehran, Iran
11 April 2002

Saudi Arabia
1

			1	2	3
1	(Syria) (Saudi Arabia)	Lays Salim; Bader Mohammed Almuqail	6; 3	3; 6	9; 11
2	(Syria) (Saudi Arabia)	Rabi Bouhassoun; Omar Althagib	6; 3	6; 1
3	(Syria) (Saudi Arabia)	Rabi Bouhassoun / Lays Salim; Baqer Abu Khulaif / Bader Mohammed Almuqail	6; 4	6; 4

=== Tajikistan vs. Pacific Oceania ===
Tajikistan
2
Enghelab Club, Tehran, Iran
11 April 2002

Pacific Oceania
1

			1	2	3
1	(Tajikistan) (Pacific Oceania)	Mansur Yakhyaev; Leon So'Onalole	3; 6	6; 2	7; 5
2	(Tajikistan) (Pacific Oceania)	Sergey Makashin; Brett Baudinet	6; 1	6; 2
3	(Tajikistan) (Pacific Oceania)	Sergey Makashin / Mansur Yakhyaev; Brett Baudinet / Juan Sebastien Langton	7; 5	3; 6	6; 8

=== Syria vs. Pacific Oceania ===
Syria
1
Enghelab Club, Tehran, Iran
12 April 2002

Pacific Oceania
2

			1	2	3
1	(Syria) (Pacific Oceania)	Lays Salim; Juan Sebastien Langton	6; 0	1; 6	12; 14
2	(Syria) (Pacific Oceania)	Rabi Bouhassoun; Leon So'Onalole	7^{7} 6^{5}	6; 2
3	(Syria) (Pacific Oceania)	Rabi Bouhassoun / Robert Makzoume; Brett Baudinet / Juan Sebastien Langton	3; 6	1; 6

=== Saudi Arabia vs. Tajikistan ===
Saudi Arabia
1
Enghelab Club, Tehran, Iran
12 April 2002

Tajikistan
2

			1	2	3
1	(Saudi Arabia) (Tajikistan)	Baqer Abu Khulaif; Mansur Yakhyaev	7^{11} 6^{9}	2; 6	0; 6
2	(Saudi Arabia) (Tajikistan)	Bader Mohammed Almuqail; Sergey Makashin	4; 6	6^{1} 7^{7}
3	(Saudi Arabia) (Tajikistan)	Baqer Abu Khulaif / Omar Althagib; Sergey Makashin / Mansur Yakhyaev	6; 1	6; 0

== Promotion pool ==
The top two teams from each of Pools A and B advanced to the Promotion pool. Results and points from games against the opponent from the preliminary round were carried forward.

Team	Pld	W	L	MF	MA
Iran	3	3	0	8	1
Tajikistan	3	2	1	5	4
United Arab Emirates	3	1	2	2	7
Pacific Oceania	3	0	3	3	6

=== Iran vs. Pacific Oceania ===
Iran
2
Enghelab Club, Tehran, Iran
13 April 2002

Pacific Oceania
1

			1	2	3
1	(Iran) (Pacific Oceania)	Anoosha Shahgholi; Leon So'Onalole	6; 4	6; 3
2	(Iran) (Pacific Oceania)	Seyed Akbar Taheri Rahaghi; Brett Baudinet	6; 0	7; 5
3	(Iran) (Pacific Oceania)	Ashkan Shokoofi / Seyed Akbar Taheri Rahaghi; Brett Baudinet / Juan Sebastien Langton	6^{8} 7^{10}	6; 3	3; 6

=== Tajikistan vs. United Arab Emirates ===
Tajikistan
3
Enghelab Club, Tehran, Iran
13 April 2002

United Arab Emirates
0

			1	2	3
1	(Tajikistan) (United Arab Emirates)	Mansur Yakhyaev; Mahmoud Nader Al Blooshi	6; 4	6; 3
2	(Tajikistan) (United Arab Emirates)	Sergey Makashin; Omar Alawadhi	7; 5	2; 6	6; 3
3	(Tajikistan) (United Arab Emirates)	Sergey Makashin / Mansur Yakhyaev; Mahmoud Nader Al Blooshi / Ali-Sherif Al Marzooqi	6; 2	6; 0

=== Iran vs. Tajikistan ===
Iran
3
Enghelab Club, Tehran, Iran
14 April 2002

Tajikistan
0

			1	2	3
1	(Iran) (Tajikistan)	Anoosha Shahgholi; Mansur Yakhyaev	6; 2	6; 4
2	(Iran) (Tajikistan)	Seyed Akbar Taheri Rahaghi; Sergey Makashin	6; 4	6; 3
3	(Iran) (Tajikistan)	Shahab Hassani-Nafez / Anoosha Shahgholi; Sergey Makashin / Mansur Yakhyaev	7; 5	6; 3

=== United Arab Emirates vs. Pacific Oceania ===
United Arab Emirates
2
Enghelab Club, Tehran, Iran
14 April 2002

Pacific Oceania
1

			1	2	3
1	(United Arab Emirates) (Pacific Oceania)	Mahmoud Nader Al Blooshi; Leon So'Onalole	3; 6	2; 6
2	(United Arab Emirates) (Pacific Oceania)	Omar Alawadhi; Brett Baudinet	1; 6	6; 3	6; 3
3	(United Arab Emirates) (Pacific Oceania)	Omar Alawadhi / Mahmoud Nader Al Blooshi; Juan Sebastien Langton / Leon So'Onalole	6; 3	6; 4

Iran and Tajikistan promoted to Group II for 2003.

== Relegation pool ==
The bottom two teams from Pools A and B were placed in the relegation group. Results and points from games against the opponent from the preliminary round were carried forward.

Team	Pld	W	L	MF	MA
Qatar	3	3	0	7	2
Syria	3	2	1	5	4
Singapore	3	1	2	3	6
Saudi Arabia	3	0	3	3	6

=== Qatar vs. Saudi Arabia ===
Qatar
2
Enghelab Club, Tehran, Iran
13 April 2002

Saudi Arabia
1

			1	2	3
1	(Qatar) (Saudi Arabia)	Sultan Khalfan Al Alawi; Baqer Abu Khulaif	6; 0	6; 3
2	(Qatar) (Saudi Arabia)	Nasser Ghanim Al Khulaifi; Bader Mohammed Almuqail	6^{2} 7^{7}	6; 4	5; 7
3	(Qatar) (Saudi Arabia)	Sultan Khalfan Al Alawi / Mohammed-Ali Al Saoud; Bader Mohammed Almuqail / Omar Althagib	6; 4	6; 1

=== Syria vs. Singapore ===
Syria
2
Enghelab Club, Tehran, Iran
13 April 2002

Singapore
1

			1	2	3
1	(Syria) (Singapore)	Lays Salim; Jensen Hiu	4; 6	6; 4	6; 4
2	(Syria) (Singapore)	Rabi Bouhassoun; Kok-Huen Kam	6; 4	6; 3
3	(Syria) (Singapore)	Rabi Bouhassoun / Robert Makzoume; Jensen Hiu / Kok-Huen Kam	5; 6			retired

=== Qatar vs. Syria ===
Qatar
2
Enghelab Club, Tehran, Iran
14 April 2002

Syria
1

			1	2	3
1	(Qatar) (Syria)	Sultan Khalfan Al Alawi; Abraham Ibrahim	6; 4	6; 1
2	(Qatar) (Syria)	Mohammed-Ali Al Saoud; Rabi Bouhassoun	1; 6	2; 6
3	(Qatar) (Syria)	Sultan Khalfan Al Alawi / Mohammed-Saadon Al Kawari; Abraham Ibrahim / Robert Makzoume	4; 6	6; 1	6; 3

=== Singapore vs. Saudi Arabia ===
Singapore
2
Enghelab Club, Tehran, Iran
14 April 2002

Saudi Arabia
1

			1	2	3
1	(Singapore) (Saudi Arabia)	Jensen Hiu; Bader Mohammed Almuqail	7; 5	6; 2
2	(Singapore) (Saudi Arabia)	Kok-Huen Kam; Omar Althagib	6; 2	5; 7	2; 6
3	(Singapore) (Saudi Arabia)	Jensen Hiu / Kok-Huen Kam; Baqer Abu Khulaif / Omar Althagib	6; 4	6^{5} 7^{7}	6; 1

Singapore and Saudi Arabia demoted to Group IV for 2003.

== Final standings ==
Rank	Team
1	Iran
2	Tajikistan
3	United Arab Emirates
4	Pacific Oceania
5	Qatar
6	Syria
7	Singapore
8	Saudi Arabia

- Iran and Tajikistan promoted to Group II in 2003.
- Singapore and Saudi Arabia relegated to Group IV in 2003.
