= 2007 Davis Cup Asia/Oceania Zone Group II =

The Asia/Oceania Zone was one of the three zones of the regional Davis Cup competition in 2007.

In the Asia/Oceania Zone, there were four tiers, called groups, in which teams competed against each other to advance to the upper tier. Winners in Group II advanced to the Asia/Oceania Zone Group I. Teams who lost their respective ties competed in the relegation play-offs, with winning teams remaining in Group II. In contrast, teams who lost their play-offs were relegated to the Asia/Oceania Zone Group III in 2008.

== Participating nations ==
- Hong Kong
- Indonesia
- Iran
- Kuwait
- New Zealand
- Pacific Oceania
- Pakistan
- Philippines

=== Draw ===
Play-offs
Apia, Samoa (hard)
1	Pakistan	2
Pacific Oceania	3
Tehran, Iran (clay)
Iran	2
Hong Kong	3

First Round
Manila, Philippines (hard)
1	Pakistan	1
Philippines	4
Dunedin, New Zealand (indoor carpet)
3	New Zealand	5
Pacific Oceania	0
Kuwait City, Kuwait (hard)
Iran	1
4	Kuwait	4
Hong Kong, China (hard)
Hong Kong	2
2	Indonesia	3

Second Round
Auckland, New Zealand (outdoor carpet)
Philippines	4
3	New Zealand	1
Kuwait City, Kuwait (hard)
4	Kuwait	4
2	Indonesia	1

Third Round
Kuwait City, Kuwait (hard)
Philippines	5
4	Kuwait	0

- Iran and Pakistan relegated to Group III in 2008.
- Philippines promoted to Group I in 2008.

== First round ==
=== Philippines vs. Pakistan ===
Philippines
4
Rizal Memorial Tennis Center, Manila, Philippines
9–11 February 2007
Hard

Pakistan
1

			1	2	3	4	5
1	(Philippines) (Pakistan)	Cecil Mamiit; Jalil Khan	6; 1	6; 0	6; 1
2	(Philippines) (Pakistan)	Eric Taino; Aqeel Khan	4; 6	6; 0	6^{1} 7^{7}	5; 7
3	(Philippines) (Pakistan)	Cecil Mamiit / Eric Taino; Aqeel Khan / Asim Shafik	5; 7	6; 4	6; 1	6; 3
4	(Philippines) (Pakistan)	Cecil Mamiit; Aqeel Khan	6; 1	6; 3	6; 2
5	(Philippines) (Pakistan)	Patrick John Tierro; Yasir Khan	6; 3	6; 0

=== New Zealand vs. Pacific Oceania ===
New Zealand
5
Edgar Centre, Dunedin, New Zealand
9–11 February 2007
Carpet (indoors)

Pacific Oceania
0

			1	2	3	4	5
1	(New Zealand) (Pacific Oceania)	Daniel King-Turner; West Nott	6; 3	6; 4	6; 4
2	(New Zealand) (Pacific Oceania)	Simon Rea; Michael Leong	6; 3	6; 2	6; 2
3	(New Zealand) (Pacific Oceania)	Daniel King-Turner / Simon Rea; Juan Sebastien Langton / Michael Leong	6; 1	6; 3	6; 3
4	(New Zealand) (Pacific Oceania)	Jose Statham; Juan Sebastien Langton	7^{7} 6^{4}	6; 1
5	(New Zealand) (Pacific Oceania)	Adam Thompson; Brett Baudinet	6; 2	6^{1} 7^{7}	6; 1

=== Kuwait vs. Iran ===
Kuwait
4
Bassam Al-Motawa Tennis Center, Kuwait City, Kuwait
9–11 February 2007
Hard

Iran
1

			1	2	3	4	5
1	(Kuwait) (Iran)	Ahmad Rabeea Muhammad; Ashkan Shokoofi	7; 5	7^{7} 6^{5}	6; 1
2	(Kuwait) (Iran)	Mohammad Ghareeb; Shahab Hassani-Nafez	6; 0	6; 2	6; 2
3	(Kuwait) (Iran)	Mohammad Ghareeb / Mohammad-Khaliq Siddiq; Shahab Hassani-Nafez / Ashkan Shokoofi	6; 2	7^{7} 6^{3}	6; 4
4	(Kuwait) (Iran)	Ali Ismaeel; Ashkan Shokoofi	1; 6	6^{3} 7^{7}
5	(Kuwait) (Iran)	Ahmad Rabeea Muhammad; Shahab Hassani-Nafez	6; 3	6; 3

=== Hong Kong vs. Indonesia ===
Hong Kong
2
Victoria Park, Causeway Bay, Hong Kong, China
9–11 February 2007
Hard

Indonesia
3

			1	2	3	4	5
1	(Hong Kong) (Indonesia)	Yu Hiu Tung; Prima Simpatiaji	7; 5	3; 6	3; 6	2; 6
2	(Hong Kong) (Indonesia)	Wayne Wong; Elbert Sie	3; 6	6; 2	6; 3	6; 1
3	(Hong Kong) (Indonesia)	Wayne Wong / Yu Hiu Tung; Christopher Rungkat / Suwandi Suwandi	4; 6	4; 6	0; 6
4	(Hong Kong) (Indonesia)	Henry So; Elbert Sie	6; 4	0; 6	3; 6	3; 6
5	(Hong Kong) (Indonesia)	Michael Lai; Christopher Rungkat	7^{7} 6^{5}	6; 2

== Second round ==
=== New Zealand vs. Philippines ===
New Zealand
1
Parnell Tennis Club, Auckland, New Zealand
6–8 April 2007
Carpet

Philippines
4

			1	2	3	4	5
1	(New Zealand) (Philippines)	Jose Statham; Cecil Mamiit	4; 6	4; 6	4; 6
2	(New Zealand) (Philippines)	Simon Rea; Eric Taino	1; 6	2; 6	4; 6
3	(New Zealand) (Philippines)	Daniel King-Turner / Simon Rea; Cecil Mamiit / Eric Taino	7; 5	6^{2} 7^{7}	6^{4} 7^{7}	2; 6
4	(New Zealand) (Philippines)	Matt Simpson; Patrick John Tierro	3; 6	6; 2	2; 6
5	(New Zealand) (Philippines)	Jose Statham; Johnny Arcilla	6; 2	6; 4

=== Kuwait vs. Indonesia ===
Kuwait
4
Bassam Al-Motowa Tennis Center, Kuwait City, Kuwait
6–8 April 2007
Hard

Indonesia
1

			1	2	3	4	5
1	(Kuwait) (Indonesia)	Mohammad Ghareeb; Prima Simpatiaji	7^{9} 6^{7}	7; 5	7; 5
2	(Kuwait) (Indonesia)	Ahmad Rabeea Muhammad; Elbert Sie	3; 6	1; 6	0; 6
3	(Kuwait) (Indonesia)	Mohammad Ghareeb / Mohammad-Khaliq Siddiq; Suwandi Suwandi / Bonit Wiryawan	6^{3} 7^{7}	2; 6	6; 2	6; 3	6; 3
4	(Kuwait) (Indonesia)	Mohammad Ghareeb; Elbert Sie	6; 1	6; 3	6; 3
5	(Kuwait) (Indonesia)	Ahmad Rabeea Muhammad; Prima Simpatiaji	3; 6	6; 4	6; 4

== Relegation play-offs ==
=== Pacific Oceania vs. Pakistan ===
Pacific Oceania
3
National Tennis Centre, Apia, Samoa
6–8 April 2007
Hard

Pakistan
2

			1	2	3	4	5
1	(Pacific Oceania) (Pakistan)	Juan Sebastien Langton; Aqeel Khan	3; 6	3; 6	6; 2	2; 6
2	(Pacific Oceania) (Pakistan)	Michael Leong; Jalil Khan	6; 1	6; 1	6; 1
3	(Pacific Oceania) (Pakistan)	Brett Baudinet / West Nott; Aqeel Khan / Shahzad Khan	7; 5	6^{6} 7^{8}	7^{7} 6^{5}	5; 7	3; 6
4	(Pacific Oceania) (Pakistan)	Michael Leong; Aqeel Khan	6; 1	6; 2	6; 2
5	(Pacific Oceania) (Pakistan)	West Nott; Jalil Khan	6; 1	6; 0	6; 0

=== Iran vs. Hong Kong ===
Iran
2
Enghelab Sports Complex, Tehran, Iran
6–8 April 2007
Clay

Hong Kong
3

			1	2	3	4	5
1	(Iran) (Hong Kong)	Anoosha Shahgholi; Michael Lai	7^{7} 6^{3}	4; 6	2; 6	6; 4	3; 6
2	(Iran) (Hong Kong)	Ashkan Shokoofi; Yu Hiu Tung	4; 6	6^{2} 7^{7}	5; 7
3	(Iran) (Hong Kong)	Anoosha Shahgholi / Ashkan Shokoofi; Henry So / Yu Hiu Tung	6; 3	6; 4	6; 2
4	(Iran) (Hong Kong)	Anoosha Shahgholi; Yu Hiu Tung	7^{7} 6^{1}	2; 6	3; 6	4; 6
5	(Iran) (Hong Kong)	Rouzbeh Kamran; Gilbert Wong	6; 1	6; 2

== Third round ==
=== Kuwait vs. Philippines ===
Kuwait
0
Bassam Al-Motowa Tennis Center, Kuwait City, Kuwait
21–23 September 2007
Hard

Philippines
5

			1	2	3	4	5
1	(Kuwait) (Philippines)	Ahmad Rabeea Muhammad; Cecil Mamiit	3; 6	0; 6	0; 6
2	(Kuwait) (Philippines)	Mohammad Ghareeb; Eric Taino	2; 6	3; 6	6^{5} 7^{7}
3	(Kuwait) (Philippines)	Mohammad Ghareeb / Mohammad-Khaliq Siddiq; Cecil Mamiit / Eric Taino	7^{7} 6^{5}	0; 6	2; 6	6; 2	1; 6
4	(Kuwait) (Philippines)	Ali Ghareeb; Patrick John Tierro	3; 6	1; 6
5	(Kuwait) (Philippines)	Ahmad Rabeea Muhammad; Johnny Arcilla	1; 6	5; 7
