= 1996 Davis Cup Asia/Oceania Zone Group III =

International tennis competition

The Asia/Oceania Zone was one of the three zones of the regional Davis Cup competition in 1996.

In the Asia/Oceania Zone there were three different tiers, called groups, in which teams competed against each other to advance to the upper tier. Winners in Group III advanced to the Asia/Oceania Zone Group II in 1997. In a move to a four-tier system, the bottom five teams were re-assigned to the new Group IV in 1997; all other teams remained in Group III.

== Participating nations ==
- Bangladesh
- Brunei
- Jordan
- Kazakhstan
- Kuwait
- Lebanon
- Malaysia
- Oman
- Pacific Oceania
- Qatar
- Singapore
- Syria
- United Arab Emirates

=== Draw ===
- Venue: Aviation Club Tennis Centre, Dubai, United Arab Emirates
- Date: 18–24 March

Group A

	SIN	MAS	POC	KAZ	SYR	OMA	RR; W–L	Match; W–L	Set; W–L	Standings
Singapore		3–0	2–1	2–1	2–1	2–1	5–0	11–4 (73%)	23–10 (70%)	1
Malaysia	0–3		2–1	2–1	1–2	2–1	3–2	7–8 (47%)	17–19 (47%)	2
Pacific Oceania	1–2	1–2		2–1	2–1	2–1	3–2	8–7 (53%)	19–16 (54%)	3
Kazakhstan	1–2	1–2	1–2		2–1	2–1	2–3	7–8 (47%)	18–20 (47%)	4
Syria	1–2	2–1	1–2	1–2		3–0	2–3	8–7 (53%)	20–17 (54%)	5
Oman	1–2	1–2	1–2	1–2	0–3		0–5	4–11 (27%)	9–24 (27%)	6

Group B

	LIB	KUW	BAN	QAT	JOR	BRU	UAE	RR; W–L	Match; W–L	Set; W–L	Standings
Lebanon		3–0	3–0	3–0	2–1	3–0	3–0	6–0	17–1 (94%)	34–1 (97%)	1
Kuwait	0–3		3–0	2–1	3–0	3–0	3–0	5–1	14–4 (78%)	28–6 (82%)	2
Bangladesh	0–3	0–3		2–1	3–0	3–0	3–0	4–2	11–7 (61%)	22–16 (58%)	3
Qatar	0–3	1–2	1–2		3–0	3–0	3–0	3–3	11–7 (61%)	22–15 (59%)	4
Jordan	1–2	0–3	0–3	0–3		3–0	3–0	2–4	7–11 (39%)	14–22 (39%)	5
Brunei	0–3	0–3	0–3	0–3	0–3		2–1	1–5	2–16 (11%)	4–33 (11%)	6
United Arab Emirates	0–3	0–3	0–3	0–3	0–3	1–2		0–6	1–17 (6%)	3–34 (8%)	7

- Singapore and Lebanon promoted to Group II in 1997.
- Syria, Oman, Jordan, Brunei and United Arab Emirates assigned to Group IV in 1997.

== Group A ==
=== Kazakhstan vs. Malaysia ===
Kazakhstan
1
Aviation Club Tennis Centre, Dubai, United Arab Emirates
20 March 1996

Malaysia
2

			1	2	3
1	(Kazakhstan) (Malaysia)	Dmitri Arissov; Chua Jin-ghee	6; 3	4; 6	2; 6
2	(Kazakhstan) (Malaysia)	Alexey Kedryuk; Vasuthevan Ortchuan	7; 5	2; 6	6; 4
3	(Kazakhstan) (Malaysia)	Dmitri Arissov / Igor Chaldounov; Chua Jin-ghee / Abdul-Aziz Shazali	3; 6	3; 6

=== Oman vs. Pacific Oceania ===
Oman
1
Aviation Club Tennis Centre, Dubai, United Arab Emirates
20 March 1996

Pacific Oceania
2

			1	2	3
1	(Oman) (Pacific Oceania)	Barkat Salim Al-Sharji; Lency Tenai	2; 6	0; 6
2	(Oman) (Pacific Oceania)	Mudrik Al-Rawahi; Sanjeev Tikaram	6; 2	7; 5
3	(Oman) (Pacific Oceania)	Mudrik Al-Rawahi / Barkat Salim Al-Sharji; Lency Tenai / Sanjeev Tikaram	2; 6	2; 6

=== Singapore vs. Syria ===
Singapore
2
Aviation Club Tennis Centre, Dubai, United Arab Emirates
20 March 1996

Syria
1

			1	2	3
1	(Singapore) (Syria)	Chen Chee-yen; Mowafak Al-Amin	6; 1	6; 1
2	(Singapore) (Syria)	Lim Yang-tat; Rabi Bouhassoun	6^{3} 7^{7}	2; 6
3	(Singapore) (Syria)	Lam Ju-min / Lim Yang-tat; Rabi Bouhassoun / Dawood Dawoodian	6; 2	6; 4

=== Kazakhstan vs. Syria ===
Kazakhstan
2
Aviation Club Tennis Centre, Dubai, United Arab Emirates
21 March 1996

Syria
1

			1	2	3
1	(Kazakhstan) (Syria)	Dmitri Arissov; Dawood Dawoodian	6; 2	3; 6	6; 4
2	(Kazakhstan) (Syria)	Alexey Kedryuk; Rabi Bouhassoun	6; 3	1; 6	2; 6
3	(Kazakhstan) (Syria)	Igor Chaldounov / Alexey Kedryuk; Mowafak Al-Amin / Rabi Bouhassoun	2; 6	6; 0	7; 5

=== Malaysia vs. Oman ===
Malaysia
2
Aviation Club Tennis Centre, Dubai, United Arab Emirates
21 March 1996

Oman
1

			1	2	3
1	(Malaysia) (Oman)	Vasuthevan Ortchuan; Barkat Salim Al-Sharji	6; 1	6; 0
2	(Malaysia) (Oman)	Cheng Heng-koon; Mudrik Al-Rawahi	1; 6	0; 6
3	(Malaysia) (Oman)	Chua Jin-ghee / Abdul-Aziz Shazali; Mudrik Al-Rawahi / Barkat Salim Al-Sharji	6; 0	6; 2

=== Pacific Oceania vs. Singapore ===
Pacific Oceania
1
Aviation Club Tennis Centre, Dubai, United Arab Emirates
21 March 1996

Singapore
2

			1	2	3
1	(Pacific Oceania) (Singapore)	Lency Tenai; Lam Ju-min	7; 5	6; 4
2	(Pacific Oceania) (Singapore)	Sanjeev Tikaram; Chen Chee-yen	6^{3} 7^{7}	0; 6
3	(Pacific Oceania) (Singapore)	Lency Tenai / Sanjeev Tikaram; Lam Ju-min / Lim Yang-tat	7; 5	3; 6	4; 6

=== Kazakhstan vs. Singapore ===
Kazakhstan
1
Aviation Club Tennis Centre, Dubai, United Arab Emirates
22–23 March 1996

Singapore
2

			1	2	3
1	(Kazakhstan) (Singapore)	Igor Chaldounov; Chen Chee-yen	2; 6	2; 6
2	(Kazakhstan) (Singapore)	Dmitri Arissov; Lim Yang-tat	6; 3	7^{7} 6^{2}
3	(Kazakhstan) (Singapore)	Dmitri Arissov / Alexey Kedryuk; Lam Ju-min / Lim Yang-tat	3; 6	6; 3	4; 6

=== Malaysia vs. Pacific Oceania ===
Malaysia
2
Aviation Club Tennis Centre, Dubai, United Arab Emirates
22–23 March 1996

Pacific Oceania
1

			1	2	3
1	(Malaysia) (Pacific Oceania)	Abdul-Aziz Shazali; Hitesh Morriswala	6; 2	6; 2
2	(Malaysia) (Pacific Oceania)	Chua Jin-ghee; Lency Tenai	7^{7} 6^{4}	4; 6	6; 1
3	(Malaysia) (Pacific Oceania)	Cheng Heng-koon / Vasuthevan Ortchuan; Cyrille Mainguy / Hitesh Morriswala	5; 7	7; 5	4; 6

=== Oman vs. Syria ===
Oman
0
Aviation Club Tennis Centre, Dubai, United Arab Emirates
22–23 March 1996

Syria
3

			1	2	3
1	(Oman) (Syria)	Barkat Salim Al-Sharji; Dawood Dawoodian	3; 6	0; 6
2	(Oman) (Syria)	Mudrik Al-Rawahi; Rabi Bouhassoun	6; 2	2; 6	1; 6
3	(Oman) (Syria)	Mudrik Al-Rawahi / Barkat Salim Al-Sharji; Dawood Dawoodian / Lays Salim	4; 6	6^{7} 7^{9}

=== Kazakhstan vs. Oman ===
Kazakhstan
2
Aviation Club Tennis Centre, Dubai, United Arab Emirates
23 March 1996

Oman
1

			1	2	3
1	(Kazakhstan) (Oman)	Dmitri Arissov; Barkat Salim Al-Sharji	6; 1	6; 2
2	(Kazakhstan) (Oman)	Alexey Kedryuk; Mudrik Al-Rawahi	1; 6	6; 3	2; 6
3	(Kazakhstan) (Oman)	Dmitri Arissov / Igor Chaldounov; Mudrik Al-Rawahi / Barkat Salim Al-Sharji	6; 1	6; 2

=== Malaysia vs. Singapore ===
Malaysia
0
Aviation Club Tennis Centre, Dubai, United Arab Emirates
23 March 1996

Singapore
3

			1	2	3
1	(Malaysia) (Singapore)	Abdul-Aziz Shazali; Lam Ju-min	3; 6	2; 6
2	(Malaysia) (Singapore)	Chua Jin-ghee; Chen Chee-yen	1; 6	5; 7
3	(Malaysia) (Singapore)	Chua Jin-ghee / Abdul-Aziz Shazali; Lam Ju-min / Lim Yang-tat	2; 6	6^{4} 7^{7}

=== Pacific Oceania vs. Syria ===
Pacific Oceania
2
Aviation Club Tennis Centre, Dubai, United Arab Emirates
23 March 1996

Syria
1

			1	2	3
1	(Pacific Oceania) (Syria)	Lency Tenai; Mowafak Al-Amin	6; 1	3; 6	6; 2
2	(Pacific Oceania) (Syria)	Sanjeev Tikaram; Rabi Bouhassoun	0; 6	1; 6
3	(Pacific Oceania) (Syria)	Lency Tenai / Sanjeev Tikaram; Mowafak Al-Amin / Rabi Bouhassoun	6; 3	6; 2

=== Kazakhstan vs. Pacific Oceania ===
Kazakhstan
1
Aviation Club Tennis Centre, Dubai, United Arab Emirates
24 March 1996

Pacific Oceania
2

			1	2	3
1	(Kazakhstan) (Pacific Oceania)	Dmitri Arissov; Lency Tenai	3; 6	4; 6
2	(Kazakhstan) (Pacific Oceania)	Alexey Kedryuk; Sanjeev Tikaram	4; 6	4; 6
3	(Kazakhstan) (Pacific Oceania)	Igor Chaldounov / Alexey Kedryuk; Cyrille Mainguy / Hitesh Morriswala	3; 6	6; 4	6; 3

=== Malaysia vs. Syria ===
Malaysia
1
Aviation Club Tennis Centre, Dubai, United Arab Emirates
24 March 1996

Syria
2

			1	2	3
1	(Malaysia) (Syria)	Vasuthevan Ortchuan; Dawood Dawoodian	3; 6	4; 6
2	(Malaysia) (Syria)	Cheng Heng-koon; Rabi Bouhassoun	3; 6	6; 3	5; 7
3	(Malaysia) (Syria)	Chua Jin-ghee / Abdul-Aziz Shazali; Dawood Dawoodian / Lays Salim	7; 5	1; 6	6; 2

=== Oman vs. Singapore ===
Oman
1
Aviation Club Tennis Centre, Dubai, United Arab Emirates
24 March 1996

Singapore
2

			1	2	3
1	(Oman) (Singapore)	Barkat Salim Al-Sharji; Lam Ju-min	3; 6	2; 6
2	(Oman) (Singapore)	Mudrik Al-Rawahi; Chen Chee-yen	3; 6	6; 2	6; 3
3	(Oman) (Singapore)	Fahad Qamar Al-Hashmi / Mudrik Al-Rawahi; Lim Kok-hong / Lim Yang-tat	2; 6	1; 6

== Group B ==
=== Bangladesh vs. Brunei ===
Bangladesh
3
Aviation Club Tennis Centre, Dubai, United Arab Emirates
18 March 1996

Brunei
0

			1	2	3
1	(Bangladesh) (Brunei)	Shovon Jamaly; Ismasufian Ibrahim	6; 1	6; 3
2	(Bangladesh) (Brunei)	Hira Lal; Zulkifli Shamsol	6; 1	6; 0
3	(Bangladesh) (Brunei)	Shovon Jamaly / Hira Lal; Nelson Cheong / On Sie-lu	6; 1	6; 0

=== Jordan vs. Kuwait ===
Jordan
0
Aviation Club Tennis Centre, Dubai, United Arab Emirates
18 March 1996

Kuwait
3

			1	2	3
1	(Jordan) (Kuwait)	Fares Azzouni; Aymen-Ibrahim Al-Ashwak	1; 6	2; 6
2	(Jordan) (Kuwait)	Laith Azzouni; Hussain Al-Ashwak	4; 6	3; 6
3	(Jordan) (Kuwait)	Laith Azzouni / Khaled Naffa; Abdullah Abdul-Aziz / Adel Al-Shatti	3; 6	3; 6

=== Lebanon vs. Qatar ===
Lebanon
3
Aviation Club Tennis Centre, Dubai, United Arab Emirates
18 March 1996

Qatar
0

			1	2	3
1	(Lebanon) (Qatar)	Toufiq Zhalan; Sultan Al-Alawi	4; 6	6; 3	6; 3
2	(Lebanon) (Qatar)	Ali Hamadeh; Nasser Al-Khelaifi	6; 1	6; 4
3	(Lebanon) (Qatar)	Ali Hamadeh / Zaki Hassan; Mohammed Salem Al-Khelaifi / Nasser Al-Khelaifi	6; 4	6; 2

=== United Arab Emirates vs. Lebanon ===
United Arab Emirates
0
Aviation Club Tennis Centre, Dubai, United Arab Emirates
19 March 1996

Lebanon
3

			1	2	3
1	(United Arab Emirates) (Lebanon)	Omar Alawadhi; Badih El-Munzer	3; 6	4; 6
2	(United Arab Emirates) (Lebanon)	Saeed Hasher Al-Maktoum; Ali Hamadeh	0; 6	1; 6
3	(United Arab Emirates) (Lebanon)	Othman Al-Ulama / Hadi Badri; Ali Hamadeh / Zaki Hassan	1; 6	0; 6

=== Bangladesh vs. Kuwait ===
Bangladesh
0
Aviation Club Tennis Centre, Dubai, United Arab Emirates
19–20 March 1996

Kuwait
3

			1	2	3
1	(Bangladesh) (Kuwait)	Shovon Jamaly; Adel Al-Shatti	1; 6	1; 6
2	(Bangladesh) (Kuwait)	Hira Lal; Hussain Al-Ashwak	4; 6	2; 6
3	(Bangladesh) (Kuwait)	Shovon Jamaly / Hira Lal; Abdullah Abdul-Aziz / Aymen-Ibrahim Al-Ashwak	3; 6	6^{4} 7^{7}

=== Brunei vs. Jordan ===
Brunei
0
Aviation Club Tennis Centre, Dubai, United Arab Emirates
19–20 March 1996

Jordan
3

			1	2	3
1	(Brunei) (Jordan)	Ismasufian Ibrahim; Fares Azzouni	2; 6	4; 6
2	(Brunei) (Jordan)	Zulkifli Shamsol; Laith Azzouni	0; 6	0; 6
3	(Brunei) (Jordan)	Nelson Cheong / On Sie-lu; Ghassan Hassan-Qadi / Khaled Naffa	1; 6	4; 6

=== United Arab Emirates vs. Bangladesh ===
United Arab Emirates
0
Aviation Club Tennis Centre, Dubai, United Arab Emirates
20 March 1996

Bangladesh
3

			1	2	3
1	(United Arab Emirates) (Bangladesh)	Othman Al-Ulama; Shovon Jamaly	0; 6	3; 6
2	(United Arab Emirates) (Bangladesh)	Saeed Hasher Al-Maktoum; Hira Lal	1; 6	2; 6
3	(United Arab Emirates) (Bangladesh)	Hadi Badri / Omar Alawadhi; Tofazzal Hossain / Dilip Passia	2; 6	0; 6

=== Brunei vs. Kuwait ===
Brunei
0
Aviation Club Tennis Centre, Dubai, United Arab Emirates
20 March 1996

Kuwait
3

			1	2	3
1	(Brunei) (Kuwait)	Nelson Cheong; Adel Al-Shatti	0; 6	0; 6
2	(Brunei) (Kuwait)	Ismasufian Ibrahim; Hussain Al-Ashwak	2; 6	0; 6
3	(Brunei) (Kuwait)	Nelson Cheong / On Sie-lu; Abdullah Abdul-Aziz / Hussain Al-Ashwak	0; 6	0; 6

=== Jordan vs. Qatar ===
Jordan
0
Aviation Club Tennis Centre, Dubai, United Arab Emirates
20 March 1996

Qatar
3

			1	2	3
1	(Jordan) (Qatar)	Fares Azzouni; Mohammed Ali Al-Saoud	7^{7} 6^{5}	6^{5} 7^{7}	3; 6
2	(Jordan) (Qatar)	Laith Azzouni; Nasser Al-Khelaifi	4; 6	5; 7
3	(Jordan) (Qatar)	Ghassan Hassan-Qadi / Khaled Naffa; Sultan Al-Alawi / Nasser Al-Khelaifi	1; 6	2; 6

=== United Arab Emirates vs. Qatar ===
United Arab Emirates
0
Aviation Club Tennis Centre, Dubai, United Arab Emirates
21 March 1996

Qatar
3

			1	2	3
1	(United Arab Emirates) (Qatar)	Omar Alawadhi; Mohammed Ali Al-Saoud	3; 6	1; 6
2	(United Arab Emirates) (Qatar)	Saeed Hasher Al-Maktoum; Nasser Al-Khelaifi	0; 6	1; 6
3	(United Arab Emirates) (Qatar)	Othman Al-Ulama / Hadi Badri; Sultan Al-Alawi / Mohammed Salem Al-Khelaifi	4; 6	5; 7

=== Bangladesh vs. Jordan ===
Bangladesh
3
Aviation Club Tennis Centre, Dubai, United Arab Emirates
21 March 1996

Jordan
0

			1	2	3
1	(Bangladesh) (Jordan)	Shovon Jamaly; Khaled Naffa	6; 3	6; 2
2	(Bangladesh) (Jordan)	Hira Lal; Laith Azzouni	6; 2	2; 6	6; 3
3	(Bangladesh) (Jordan)	Shovon Jamaly / Hira Lal; Fares Azzouni / Laith Azzouni	7; 5	6; 1

=== Brunei vs. Lebanon ===
Brunei
0
Aviation Club Tennis Centre, Dubai, United Arab Emirates
21 March 1996

Lebanon
3

			1	2	3
1	(Brunei) (Lebanon)	Nelson Cheong; Badih El-Munzer	1; 6	0; 6
2	(Brunei) (Lebanon)	Ismasufian Ibrahim; Toufiq Zhalan	1; 6	2; 6
3	(Brunei) (Lebanon)	Nelson Cheong / On Sie-lu; Ali Hamadeh / Zaki Hassan	2; 6	0; 6

=== United Arab Emirates vs. Brunei ===
United Arab Emirates
1
Aviation Club Tennis Centre, Dubai, United Arab Emirates
22–23 March 1996

Brunei
2

			1	2	3
1	(United Arab Emirates) (Brunei)	Othman Al-Ulama; Nelson Cheong	6; 2	7^{7} 6^{5}
2	(United Arab Emirates) (Brunei)	Saeed Hasher Al-Maktoum; Ismasufian Ibrahim	7; 5	1; 6	6; 8
3	(United Arab Emirates) (Brunei)	Othman Al-Ulama / Hadi Badri; Ismasufian Ibrahim / Zulkifli Shamsol	4; 6	3; 6

=== Bangladesh vs. Lebanon ===
Bangladesh
0
Aviation Club Tennis Centre, Dubai, United Arab Emirates
22–23 March 1996

Lebanon
3

			1	2	3
1	(Bangladesh) (Lebanon)	Shovon Jamaly; Zaki Hassan	3; 6	1; 6
2	(Bangladesh) (Lebanon)	Hira Lal; Ali Hamadeh	2; 6	2; 6
3	(Bangladesh) (Lebanon)	Tofazzal Hossain / Dilip Passia; Badih El-Munzer / Toufiq Zhalan	3; 6	2; 6

=== Kuwait vs. Qatar ===
Kuwait
2
Aviation Club Tennis Centre, Dubai, United Arab Emirates
22–23 March 1996

Qatar
1

			1	2	3
1	(Kuwait) (Qatar)	Adel Al-Shatti; Sultan Al-Alawi	6; 0	6; 2
2	(Kuwait) (Qatar)	Hussain Al-Ashwak; Nasser Al-Khelaifi	6; 4	7^{7} 6^{4}
3	(Kuwait) (Qatar)	Abdullah Abdul-Aziz / Aymen-Ibrahim Al-Ashwak; Sultan Al-Alawi / Nasser Al-Khelaifi	0; 0			retired

=== United Arab Emirates vs. Jordan ===
United Arab Emirates
0
Aviation Club Tennis Centre, Dubai, United Arab Emirates
23 March 1996

Jordan
3

			1	2	3
1	(United Arab Emirates) (Jordan)	Omar Alawadhi; Khaled Naffa	4; 6	1; 6
2	(United Arab Emirates) (Jordan)	Saeed Hasher Al-Maktoum; Laith Azzouni	4; 6	4; 6
3	(United Arab Emirates) (Jordan)	Hadi Badri / Omar Alawadhi; Fares Azzouni / Laith Azzouni	3; 6	1; 6

=== Bangladesh vs. Qatar ===
Bangladesh
2
Aviation Club Tennis Centre, Dubai, United Arab Emirates
23 March 1996

Qatar
1

			1	2	3
1	(Bangladesh) (Qatar)	Shovon Jamaly; Mohammed Ali Al-Saoud	6; 1	6; 0
2	(Bangladesh) (Qatar)	Hira Lal; Nasser Al-Khelaifi	4; 6	6; 0	7; 5
3	(Bangladesh) (Qatar)	Tofazzal Hossain / Dilip Passia; Sultan Al-Alawi / Nasser Al-Khelaifi	3; 6	0; 6

=== Kuwait vs. Lebanon ===
Kuwait
0
Aviation Club Tennis Centre, Dubai, United Arab Emirates
23 March 1996

Lebanon
3

			1	2	3
1	(Kuwait) (Lebanon)	Adel Al-Shatti; Zaki Hassan	2; 6	2; 6
2	(Kuwait) (Lebanon)	Hussain Al-Ashwak; Ali Hamadeh	2; 6	2; 6
3	(Kuwait) (Lebanon)	Abdullah Abdul-Aziz / Adel Al-Shatti; Badih El-Munzer / Zaki Hassan	4; 6	3; 6

=== United Arab Emirates vs. Kuwait ===
United Arab Emirates
0
Aviation Club Tennis Centre, Dubai, United Arab Emirates
24 March 1996

Kuwait
3

			1	2	3
1	(United Arab Emirates) (Kuwait)	Hadi Badri; Aymen-Ibrahim Al-Ashwak	0; 6	1; 6
2	(United Arab Emirates) (Kuwait)	Omar Alawadhi; Adel Al-Shatti	1; 6	1; 6
3	(United Arab Emirates) (Kuwait)	Saeed Hasher Al-Maktoum / Omar Alawadhi; Hussain Al-Ashwak / Adel Al-Shatti	2; 6	1; 6

=== Brunei vs. Qatar ===
Brunei
0
Aviation Club Tennis Centre, Dubai, United Arab Emirates
24 March 1996

Qatar
3

			1	2	3
1	(Brunei) (Qatar)	Ismasufian Ibrahim; Sultan Al-Alawi	0; 6	1; 6
2	(Brunei) (Qatar)	Zulkifli Shamsol; Nasser Al-Khelaifi	0; 6	2; 6
3	(Brunei) (Qatar)	Nelson Cheong / On Sie-lu; Sultan Al-Alawi / Mohammed Salem Al-Khelaifi	4; 6	4; 6

=== Jordan vs. Lebanon ===
Jordan
1
Aviation Club Tennis Centre, Dubai, United Arab Emirates
24 March 1996

Lebanon
2

			1	2	3
1	(Jordan) (Lebanon)	Ghassan Hassan-Qadi; Badih El-Munzer	1; 6	1; 6
2	(Jordan) (Lebanon)	Khaled Naffa; Ali Hamadeh	1; 6	1; 6
3	(Jordan) (Lebanon)	Ghassan Hassan-Qadi / Khaled Naffa; Ali Hamadeh / Toufiq Zhalan	0; 1			retired
