= 2009 Davis Cup Asia/Oceania Zone Group III =

International tennis competition

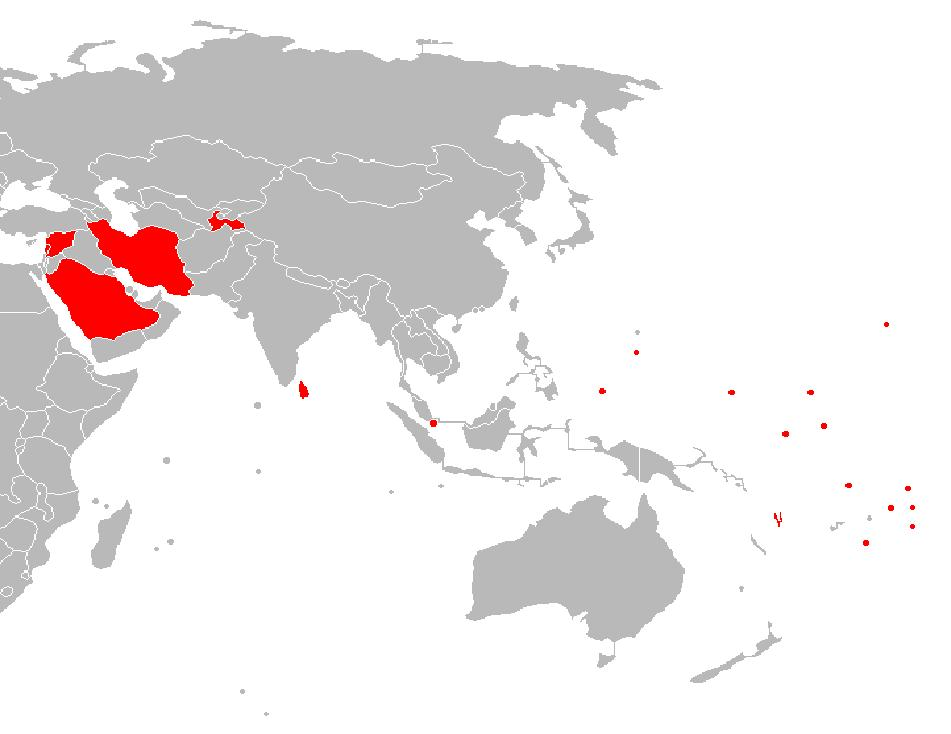
Countries participating in the 2009 Davis Cup Asia/Oceania Zone Group III

The Asian and Oceanian Zone is one of the three zones of regional Davis Cup competition in 2009.

In the Asian and Oceanian Zone there are four different groups in which teams compete against each other to advance to the next group.

== Format ==
There will be a Round Robin with eight teams. The eight nations will be divided into two pools of four. The top two teams in each pool will advance to the Final Pool of four teams from which the two highest-placed nations are promoted to Asia and Oceania Group II in 2010. The bottom two teams of each pool of the Round Robin will compete against each other in the Relegation Pool. The two lowest-placed nations are relegated to Asia and Oceania Group IV in 2010.

== Information ==
Venue: Al-Hamadaniah Tennis Complex, Aleppo, Syria

Surface: Hard – outdoors

Dates: 15–19 April

== Participating teams ==
- Iran
- Lebanon
- Pacific Oceania
- Saudi Arabia
- Singapore
- Sri Lanka
- Syria
- Tajikistan

== Pool A ==
		POC	LIB	TJK	SIN
1	Pacific Oceania (3–0)		2–1	3–0	3–0
2	Lebanon (2–1)	1–2		2–1	2–1
3	Tajikistan (1–2)	0–3	1–2		3–0
4	Singapore (0–3)	0–3	1–2	0–3	

=== Matches ===
==== Tajikistan vs. Pacific Oceania ====
Tajikistan
0
Hamadaniah Sport Centre, Aleppo, Syria
15 April 2009
hard (outdoors)

Pacific Oceania
3

			1	2	3
1	(Tajikistan) (Pacific Oceania)	Bakhtiyor Sadulloev; Juan Sebastien Langton	4; 6	2; 6
2	(Tajikistan) (Pacific Oceania)	Sergey Makashin; Michael Leong	2; 6	2; 6
3	(Tajikistan) (Pacific Oceania)	Bakhtiyor Sadulloev / Mirkhusein Yakhyaev; Brett Baudinet / Cyril Jacobe	1; 6	2; 6

==== Singapore vs. Lebanon ====
Singapore
1
Hamadaniah Sport Centre, Aleppo, Syria
15 April 2009
hard (outdoors)

Lebanon
2

			1	2	3
1	(Singapore) (Lebanon)	Stanley Armando; Brahim Saffiedine	6; 4	2; 6	6; 2
2	(Singapore) (Lebanon)	Abdul-Hakim Jamaludin; Karim Al-Ayly	1; 6	1; 6
3	(Singapore) (Lebanon)	Stanley Armando / Daniel Heryanta Dewandaka; Karim Al-Ayly / Hicham Zaatini	1; 6	0; 6

==== Singapore vs. Pacific Oceania ====
Singapore
0
Hamadaniah Sport Centre, Aleppo, Syria
16 April 2009
hard (outdoors)

Pacific Oceania
3

			1	2	3
1	(Singapore) (Pacific Oceania)	Stanley Armando; Juan Sebastien Langton	6; 3	2; 6	5; 7
2	(Singapore) (Pacific Oceania)	Abdul-Hakim Jamaludin; Michael Leong	0; 6	3; 6
3	(Singapore) (Pacific Oceania)	Abdul-Hakim Jamaludin / Marcus Dexian Tay; Brett Baudinet / Cyril Jacobe	6^{4} 7^{7}	3; 6

==== Tajikistan vs. Lebanon ====
Tajikistan
1
Hamadaniah Sport Centre, Aleppo, Syria
16 April 2009
hard (outdoors)

Lebanon
2

			1	2	3
1	(Tajikistan) (Lebanon)	Mirkhusein Yakhyaev; Brahim Saffiedine	6; 0	6; 3
2	(Tajikistan) (Lebanon)	Bakhtiyor Sadulloev; Karim Al-Ayly	3; 6	1; 6
3	(Tajikistan) (Lebanon)	Sergey Makashin / Mirkhusein Yakhyaev; Karim Al-Ayly / Hicham Zaatini	5; 7	4; 6

==== Lebanon vs. Pacific Oceania ====
Lebanon
1
Hamadaniah Sport Centre, Aleppo, Syria
17 April 2009
hard (outdoors)

Pacific Oceania
2

			1	2	3
1	(Lebanon) (Pacific Oceania)	Hicham Zaatini; Juan Sebastien Langton	4; 6	6; 3	4; 6
2	(Lebanon) (Pacific Oceania)	Karim Al-Ayly; Brett Baudinet	4; 6	1; 3		retired
3	(Lebanon) (Pacific Oceania)	Karim Al-Ayly / Hicham Zaatini; Brett Baudinet / Cyril Jacobe	7; 5	3; 6	4; 6

==== Singapore vs. Tajikistan ====
Singapore
0
Hamadaniah Sport Centre, Aleppo, Syria
17 April 2009
hard (outdoors)

Tajikistan
3

			1	2	3
1	(Singapore) (Tajikistan)	Marcus Dexian Tay; Mirkhusein Yakhyaev	3; 6	4; 6
2	(Singapore) (Tajikistan)	Stanley Armando; Sergey Makashin	5; 7	0; 6
3	(Singapore) (Tajikistan)	Stanley Armando / Daniel Heryanta Dewandaka; Sergey Makashin / Mirkhusein Yakhyaev	2; 6	5; 7

== Pool B ==
		SRI	SYR	KSA	IRI
1	Sri Lanka (3–0)		3–0	3–0	2–1
2	Syria (2–1)	0–3		3–0	3–0
3	Saudi Arabia (1–2)	0–3	0–3		2–1
4	Iran (0–3)	1–2	0–3	1–2	

=== Matches ===
==== Iran vs. Sri Lanka ====
Iran
1
Hamadaniah Sport Centre, Aleppo, Syria
15 April 2009
hard (outdoors)

Sri Lanka
2

			1	2	3
1	(Iran) (Sri Lanka)	Anousha Shahgholi; Rajeev Rajapakse	7^{7} 6^{1}	5; 7	6; 0
2	(Iran) (Sri Lanka)	Rouzbeh Kamran; Harshana Godamanna	3; 6	2; 6
3	(Iran) (Sri Lanka)	Anousha Shahgholi / Ashkan Shokoofi; Harshana Godamanna / Rajeev Rajapakse	0; 6	2; 6

==== Syria vs. Saudi Arabia ====
Syria
3
Hamadaniah Sport Centre, Aleppo, Syria
15 April 2009
hard (outdoors)

Saudi Arabia
0

			1	2	3
1	(Syria) (Saudi Arabia)	Romain Radwan; Fahad Al-Saad	7^{7} 6^{2}	6; 3
2	(Syria) (Saudi Arabia)	Issam Haitham Taweel; Saleh Al-Rajeh	6; 3	7; 5
3	(Syria) (Saudi Arabia)	Hayan Marouf / Roy Radwan; Fahad Al-Saad / Bader Al-Muqail	6; 3	6; 4

==== Saudi Arabia vs. Sri Lanka ====
Saudi Arabia
0
Hamadaniah Sport Centre, Aleppo, Syria
16 April 2009
hard (outdoors)

Sri Lanka
3

			1	2	3
1	(Saudi Arabia) (Sri Lanka)	Fahad Al-Saad; Rajeev Rajapakse	1; 6	7; 5	4; 6
2	(Saudi Arabia) (Sri Lanka)	Saleh Al-Rajeh; Harshana Godamanna	4; 6	0; 6
3	(Saudi Arabia) (Sri Lanka)	Omar Al-Thagib / Bader Al-Muqail; Harshana Godamanna / Rajeev Rajapakse	2; 6	3; 6

==== Syria vs. Iran ====
Syria
3
Hamadaniah Sport Centre, Aleppo, Syria
16 April 2009
hard (outdoors)

Iran
0

			1	2	3
1	(Syria) (Iran)	Roy Radwan; Ashkan Shokoofi	4; 6	6; 2	6; 4
2	(Syria) (Iran)	Romain Radwan; Anousha Shahgholi	7; 5	6; 6		retired
3	(Syria) (Iran)	Hayan Marouf / Issam Haitham Taweel; Rouzbeh Kamran / Omid Souri	6; 2	6; 4

==== Syria vs. Sri Lanka ====
Syria
0
Hamadaniah Sport Centre, Aleppo, Syria
17 April 2009
hard (outdoors)

Sri Lanka
3

			1	2	3
1	(Syria) (Sri Lanka)	Romain Radwan; Rajeev Rajapakse	6; 4	5; 7	1; 6
2	(Syria) (Sri Lanka)	Issam Haitham Taweel; Harshana Godamanna	7; 5	2; 6	2; 6
3	(Syria) (Sri Lanka)	Hayan Marouf / Issam Haitham Taweel; Harshana Godamanna / Rajeev Rajapakse	2; 6	2; 6

==== Saudi Arabia vs. Iran ====
Saudi Arabia
2
Hamadaniah Sport Centre, Aleppo, Syria
17 April 2009
hard (outdoors)

Iran
1

			1	2	3
1	(Saudi Arabia) (Iran)	Omar Al-Thagib; Omid Souri	4; 6	3; 6
2	(Saudi Arabia) (Iran)	Fahad Al-Saad; Anousha Shahgholi	6; 4	3; 1		retired
3	(Saudi Arabia) (Iran)	Fahad Al-Saad / Bader Al-Muqail; Anousha Shahgholi / Ashkan Shokoofi	5; 7	6; 3	6; 4

== Promotion Pool ==
		POC	SRI	SYR	LIB
1	Pacific Oceania (3–0)		3–0	2–1	2–1
2	Sri Lanka (2–1)	0–3		3–0	3–0
3	Syria (1–2)	1–2	0–3		3–0
4	Lebanon (0–3)	1–2	0–3	0–3	

- Pacific Oceania and Sri Lanka promoted to Group II in 2010.

=== Matches ===
==== Lebanon vs. Sri Lanka ====
Lebanon
0
Hamadaniah Sport Centre, Aleppo, Syria
18 April 2009
hard (outdoors)

Sri Lanka
3

			1	2	3
1	(Lebanon) (Sri Lanka)	Brahim Saffiedine; Rajeev Rajapakse	4; 6	2; 6
2	(Lebanon) (Sri Lanka)	Karim Al-Ayly; Harshana Godamanna	4; 6	3; 6
3	(Lebanon) (Sri Lanka)	Rami Osman / Brahim Saffiedine; Rajeev Rajapakse / Harshana Godamanna	0; 6	1; 6

==== Syria vs. Pacific Oceania ====
Syria
1
Hamadaniah Sport Centre, Aleppo, Syria
18 April 2009
hard (outdoors)

Pacific Oceania
2

			1	2	3
1	(Syria) (Pacific Oceania)	Hayan Marouf; Juan Sebastien Langton	6; 0	6; 4
2	(Syria) (Pacific Oceania)	Issam Haitham Taweel; Michael Leong	1; 6	3; 6
3	(Syria) (Pacific Oceania)	Hayan Marouf / Roy Radwan; Brett Baudinet / Cyril Jacobe	0; 6	4; 6

==== Pacific Oceania vs. Sri Lanka ====
Pacific Oceania
3
Hamadaniah Sport Centre, Aleppo, Syria
19 April 2009
hard (outdoors)

Sri Lanka
0

			1	2	3
1	(Pacific Oceania) (Sri Lanka)	Juan Sebastien Langton; Rajeev Rajapakse	7^{7} 6^{5}	6; 4
2	(Pacific Oceania) (Sri Lanka)	Michael Leong; Harshana Godamanna	7; 5	6; 1
3	(Pacific Oceania) (Sri Lanka)	Brett Baudinet / Cyril Jacobe; Sankha Atukorale / Harshana Godamanna	4; 6	6; 2	6; 4

==== Syria vs. Lebanon ====
Syria
3
Hamadaniah Sport Centre, Aleppo, Syria
19 April 2009
hard (outdoors)

Lebanon
0

			1	2	3
1	(Syria) (Lebanon)	Hayan Marouf; Rami Osman	6; 1	6; 3
2	(Syria) (Lebanon)	Issam Haitham Taweel; Brahim Saffiedine	6; 3	6; 2
3	(Syria) (Lebanon)	Romain Radwan / Roy Radwan; Rami Osman / Brahim Saffiedine	5; 0			retired

== Relegation Pool ==
		KSA	IRI	TJK	SIN
1	Saudi Arabia (3–0)		2–1	3–0	3–0
2	Iran (2–1)	1–2		2–1	3–0
3	Tajikistan (1–2)	0–3	1–2		3–0
4	Singapore (0–3)	0–3	0–3	0–3	

- Tajikistan and Singapore relegated to Group IV in 2010.

=== Matches ===
==== Iran vs. Tajikistan ====
Iran
2
Hamadaniah Sport Centre, Aleppo, Syria
18 April 2009
hard (outdoors)

Tajikistan
1

			1	2	3
1	(Iran) (Tajikistan)	Anousha Shahgholi; Mirkhusein Yakhyaev	6; 4	4; 6	6; 2
2	(Iran) (Tajikistan)	Rouzbeh Kamran; Sergey Makashin	2; 6	5; 7
3	(Iran) (Tajikistan)	Anousha Shahgholi / Ashkan Shokoofi; Sergey Makashin / Mirkhusein Yakhyaev	6; 3	6; 1

==== Singapore vs. Saudi Arabia ====
Singapore
0
Hamadaniah Sport Centre, Aleppo, Syria
18 April 2009
hard (outdoors)

Saudi Arabia
3

			1	2	3
1	(Singapore) (Saudi Arabia)	Marcus Dexian Tay; Fahad Al-Saad	1; 6	1; 6
2	(Singapore) (Saudi Arabia)	Abdul-Hakim Jamaludin; Saleh Al-Rajeh	1; 6	1; 6
3	(Singapore) (Saudi Arabia)	Abdul-Hakim Jamaludin / Marcus Dexian Tay; Omar Al-Thagib / Bader Al-Muqail	2; 6	4; 6

==== Saudi Arabia vs. Tajikistan ====
Saudi Arabia
3
Hamadaniah Sport Centre, Aleppo, Syria
19 April 2009
hard (outdoors)

Tajikistan
0

			1	2	3
1	(Saudi Arabia) (Tajikistan)	Fahad Al-Saad; Sergey Makashin	3; 6	7; 5	7; 5
2	(Saudi Arabia) (Tajikistan)	Saleh Al-Rajeh; Bakhtiyor Sadulloev	7^{7} 6^{2}	6; 2
3	(Saudi Arabia) (Tajikistan)	Omar Al-Thagib / Bader Al-Muqail; Bakhtiyor Sadulloev / Mirkhusein Yakhyaev	5; 3			retired

==== Singapore vs. Iran ====
Singapore
0
Hamadaniah Sport Centre, Aleppo, Syria
19 April 2009
hard (outdoors)

Iran
3

			1	2	3
1	(Singapore) (Iran)	Marcus Dexian Tay; Anousha Shahgholi	1; 6	0; 6
2	(Singapore) (Iran)	Abdul-Hakim Jamaludin; Rouzbeh Kamran	0; 6	6^{2} 7^{7}
3	(Singapore) (Iran)	Abdul-Hakim Jamaludin / Marcus Dexian Tay; Anousha Shahgholi / Ashkan Shokoofi	3; 6	2; 6
