= Philipp Müllner =

Austrian professional tennis player

- Country (sports): Austria
- Born: 11 April 1980 (age 45)
- Plays: Right-handed
- Prize money: $33,507

Singles
- Highest ranking: No. 329 (27 Oct 2003)

Doubles
- Highest ranking: No. 230 (1 Dec 2003)

Philipp Müllner (born 11 April 1980) is an Austrian former professional tennis player.

Müllner reached a career high singles ranking of 329 in the world and won four ITF Futures titles. His best performance on the ATP Challenger Tour came at the 2003 Tehran Challenger, where he made the singles semi-finals and won the doubles event, partnering Daniel Köllerer.

== Challenger/Futures titles ==
=== Singles: (4) ===
Legend
ITF Futures (4)

| No. | Date | Tournament | Tier | Surface | Opponent | Score |
|---|---|---|---|---|---|---|
| 1. | May 2002 | Korea Rep. F2, Cheongju | Futures | Clay | (Argentina) Roberto Álvarez | 6–2, 6–3 |
| 2. | Jun 2003 | Serbia & Montenegro F2, Belgrade | Futures | Clay | (Bulgaria) Ivaylo Traykov | 3–6, 7–6^{(2)}, 7–6^{(5)} |
| 3. | Jun 2004 | Serbia & Montenegro F1, Sombor | Futures | Clay | (Serbia and Montenegro) Nikola Ćirić | 4–6, 7–5, 6–2 |
| 4. | Aug 2005 | Iran F1, Tehran | Futures | Clay | (Tunisia) Malek Jaziri | 6–3, 7–6^{(5)} |

=== Doubles: (3) ===
Legend
ATP Challenger (1)
ITF Futures (2)

| No. | Date | Tournament | Tier | Surface | Partner | Opponents | Score |
|---|---|---|---|---|---|---|---|
| 1. | Sep 2003 | Tehran Challenger, Tehran | Challenger | Clay | (Austria) Daniel Köllerer | (Slovakia) Ivo Klec (Czech Republic) Josef Neštický | w/o |
| 2. | Oct 2003 | Croatia F9, Veli Lošinj | Futures | Clay | (Austria) Herbert Wiltschnig | (Hungary) Kornél Bardóczky (Slovenia) Marko Tkalec | 7–5, 1–0 ret. |
| 3. | Sep 2005 | Iran F3, Tehran | Futures | Clay | (Austria) Herbert Wiltschnig | (Iran) Anoosha Shahgholi (Iran) Ashkan Shokoofi | 6–2, 6–4 |
