= Al-Hamadaniah Tennis Complex =

Tennis complex in Aleppo, Syria

Coordinates: 36°11′19″N 37°07′07″E

- Interactive map of Al-Hamadaniah Tennis Complex
- Location: Aleppo, Syria
- Capacity: indoor court: 800 outdoor court: 598
- Surface: Hard

Construction
- Opened: 2008

Al-Hamadaniah Tennis Complex (Arabic: مجمع الحمدانية للتنس) is a tennis complex in Aleppo, Syria, featuring an indoor tennis court with a seating capacity of 800 spectators and an outdoor tennis court with a seating capacity of 598 spectators along with 4 other outdoor training courts. The complex was opened in 2008, as part of the al-Hamadaniah Sports City.

The 1st major tournament in the complex took place in the outdoor courts between 15 and 19 April 2009, when Aleppo hosted the 2009 Davis Cup Asia/Oceania Zone Group III matches, with the participation of the 8 following teams:

- Iran
- Lebanon
- Pacific Oceania
- Saudi Arabia
- Singapore
- Sri Lanka
- Syria
- Tajikistan
