= 2003 Davis Cup Asia/Oceania Zone Group IV =

International tennis competition

The Group IV tournament was held June 18–21, in Colombo, Sri Lanka, on outdoor clay courts.

== Format ==
The eight teams were split into two groups and played in a round-robin format. The top two teams of each group advanced to the promotion pool, from which the two top teams were promoted to the Asia/Oceania Zone Group III in 2004.

== Pool A ==
Team	Pld	W	L	MF	MA
Vietnam	3	3	0	6	2
Saudi Arabia	3	2	1	6	2
Sri Lanka	3	1	2	4	4
Brunei	3	0	3	0	8

=== Sri Lanka vs. Vietnam ===
Sri Lanka
1
National Tennis Centre, Colombo, Sri Lanka
18 June 2003

Vietnam
2

			1	2	3
1	(Sri Lanka) (Vietnam)	Rohan De Silva; Ngô Quang Huy				w/o
2	(Sri Lanka) (Vietnam)	Rajeev Rajapakse; Đỗ Minh Quân	6^{2} 7^{7}	4; 6
3	(Sri Lanka) (Vietnam)	Rohan De Silva / Franklyn Emmanuel; Lê Quốc Khánh / Ngô Đức Dương	3; 6	2; 6

=== Saudi Arabia vs. Brunei ===
Saudi Arabia
3
National Tennis Centre, Colombo, Sri Lanka
18 June 2003

Brunei
0

			1	2	3
1	(Saudi Arabia) (Brunei)	Bader Mohammed Almuqail; Wong-Kee Loong	6; 4	6; 3
2	(Saudi Arabia) (Brunei)	Omar Althagib; Ismasufian Ibrahim	6; 1	6; 2
3	(Saudi Arabia) (Brunei)	Bader Mohammed Almuqail / Fahad Al Saad; Abdul-Rasheed Abdullah / Mohammed Ridzuan-Yunos	6; 1	6; 1

=== Sri Lanka vs. Saudi Arabia ===
Sri Lanka
0
National Tennis Centre, Colombo, Sri Lanka
19 June 2003

Saudi Arabia
2

			1	2	3
1	(Sri Lanka) (Saudi Arabia)	Franklyn Emmanuel; Bader Mohammed Almuqail	6^{4} 7^{7}	3; 6
2	(Sri Lanka) (Saudi Arabia)	Harshana Godamanna; Omar Althagib	5; 7	4; 6
3	(Sri Lanka) (Saudi Arabia)	Rohan De Silva / Rajeev Rajapakse; Bader Mohammed Almuqail / Fahad Al Saad				not played

=== Brunei vs. Vietnam ===
Brunei
0
National Tennis Centre, Colombo, Sri Lanka
19 June 2003

Vietnam
2

			1	2	3
1	(Brunei) (Vietnam)	Abdul-Rasheed Abdullah; Lê Quốc Khánh	0; 6	0; 3		retired
2	(Brunei) (Vietnam)	Wong-Kee Loong; Ngô Quang Huy	2; 6	2; 6
3	(Brunei) (Vietnam)	Abdul-Rasheed Abdullah / Ismasufian Ibrahim; Lê Quốc Khánh / Ngô Đức Dương				not played

=== Sri Lanka vs. Brunei ===
Sri Lanka
3
National Tennis Centre, Colombo, Sri Lanka
20 June 2003

Brunei
0

			1	2	3
1	(Sri Lanka) (Brunei)	Rajeev Rajapakse; Wong-Kee Loong	6; 1	6; 1
2	(Sri Lanka) (Brunei)	Harshana Godamanna; Ismasufian Ibrahim	6; 0	6; 1
3	(Sri Lanka) (Brunei)	Rohan De Silva / Rajeev Rajapakse; Ismasufian Ibrahim / Wong-Kee Loong	6; 0	6; 1

=== Saudi Arabia vs. Vietnam ===
Saudi Arabia
1
National Tennis Centre, Colombo, Sri Lanka
20 June 2003

Vietnam
2

			1	2	3
1	(Saudi Arabia) (Vietnam)	Fahad Al Saad; Lê Quốc Khánh	3; 6	7^{7} 6^{5}	6; 4
2	(Saudi Arabia) (Vietnam)	Omar Althagib; Đỗ Minh Quân	6^{5} 7^{7}	1; 6
3	(Saudi Arabia) (Vietnam)	Bader Mohammed Almuqail / Fahad Al Saad; Đỗ Minh Quân / Lê Quốc Khánh	6; 2	5; 7	0; 6

== Pool B ==
Team	Pld	W	L	MF	MA
Oman	3	3	0	7	2
Myanmar	3	2	1	5	4
Singapore	3	1	2	4	5
Bangladesh	3	0	3	2	7

=== Singapore vs. Bangladesh ===
Singapore
2
National Tennis Centre, Colombo, Sri Lanka
18 June 2003

Bangladesh
1

			1	2	3
1	(Singapore) (Bangladesh)	Kok-Huen Kam; Hira Lal	6; 2	6^{3} 7^{7}	6; 3
2	(Singapore) (Bangladesh)	Kamil Ghazali; Sree-Amol Roy	1; 6	4; 6
3	(Singapore) (Bangladesh)	Ming-Chye Lim / Daniel Heryanta Dewandaka; Hira Lal / Sree-Amol Roy	6; 0	6; 3

=== Oman vs. Myanmar ===
Oman
3
National Tennis Centre, Colombo, Sri Lanka
18 June 2003

Myanmar
0

			1	2	3
1	(Oman) (Myanmar)	Mohammed Al Nabhani; Min Min	6; 1	6; 4
2	(Oman) (Myanmar)	Khalid Al Nabhani; Zaw Zaw Latt	2; 6	6; 4	6; 2
3	(Oman) (Myanmar)	Khalid Al Nabhani / Mohammed Al Nabhani; Zaw Zaw Latt / Khin Maung Win	6; 2	5; 7	9; 7

=== Singapore vs. Myanmar ===
Singapore
1
National Tennis Centre, Colombo, Sri Lanka
19 June 2003

Myanmar
2

			1	2	3
1	(Singapore) (Myanmar)	Kok-Huen Kam; Khin Maung Win	4; 6	6; 0	1; 6
2	(Singapore) (Myanmar)	Kamil Ghazali; Zaw Zaw Latt	3; 6	4; 6
3	(Singapore) (Myanmar)	Ming-Chye Lim / Daniel Heryanta Dewandaka; Zaw Zaw Latt / Khin Maung Win	6; 4	0; 6	6; 4

=== Oman vs. Bangladesh ===
Oman
2
National Tennis Centre, Colombo, Sri Lanka
19 June 2003

Bangladesh
1

			1	2	3
1	(Oman) (Bangladesh)	Mohammed Al Nabhani; Hira Lal	5; 7	2; 6
2	(Oman) (Bangladesh)	Khalid Al Nabhani; Sree-Amol Roy	6; 2	6; 1
3	(Oman) (Bangladesh)	Khalid Al Nabhani / Mohammed Al Nabhani; Hira Lal / Sree-Amol Roy	6; 2	7; 5

=== Singapore vs. Oman ===
Singapore
1
National Tennis Centre, Colombo, Sri Lanka
20 June 2003

Oman
2

			1	2	3
1	(Singapore) (Oman)	Kok-Huen Kam; Mohammed Al Nabhani	0; 6	4; 6
2	(Singapore) (Oman)	Kamil Ghazali; Khalid Al Nabhani	1; 6	2; 6
3	(Singapore) (Oman)	Ming-Chye Lim / Daniel Heryanta Dewandaka; Khalid Al Nabhani / Mohammed Al Nabhani	6; 4	6; 2

=== Bangladesh vs. Myanmar ===
Bangladesh
0
National Tennis Centre, Colombo, Sri Lanka
20 June 2003

Myanmar
3

			1	2	3
1	(Bangladesh) (Myanmar)	Hira Lal; Khin Maung Win	2; 6	5; 7
2	(Bangladesh) (Myanmar)	Sree-Amol Roy; Zaw Zaw Latt	6; 3	5; 7	3; 6
3	(Bangladesh) (Myanmar)	Abu-Hena-Tasawar Collins / Mohammed-Akhtar Hossain; Maung-Tu Maw / Min Min	4; 6	2; 6

== Promotion pool ==
The top two teams from each of Pools A and B advanced to the Promotion pool. Results and points from games against the opponent from the preliminary round were carried forward.

Team	Pld	W	L	MF	MA
Vietnam	2	2	0	5	1
Oman	2	2	0	5	1
Saudi Arabia	2	0	2	2	4
Myanmar	2	0	2	0	6

=== Vietnam vs. Myanmar ===
Vietnam
3
National Tennis Centre, Colombo, Sri Lanka
21 June 2003

Myanmar
0

			1	2	3
1	(Vietnam) (Myanmar)	Ngô Quang Huy; Khin Maung Win	3; 6	6; 3	6; 2
2	(Vietnam) (Myanmar)	Đỗ Minh Quân; Zaw Zaw Latt	6; 2	7^{9} 6^{7}
3	(Vietnam) (Myanmar)	Lê Quốc Khánh / Ngô Đức Dương; Zaw Zaw Latt / Khin Maung Win	6; 3	6; 4

=== Saudi Arabia vs. Oman ===
Saudi Arabia
1
National Tennis Centre, Colombo, Sri Lanka
21 June 2003

Oman
2

			1	2	3
1	(Saudi Arabia) (Oman)	Fahad Al Saad; Mohammed Al Nabhani	2; 6	7^{11} 6^{9}	6; 3
2	(Saudi Arabia) (Oman)	Bader Mohammed Almuqail; Khalid Al Nabhani	6; 2	3; 6	5; 7
3	(Saudi Arabia) (Oman)	Bader Mohammed Almuqail / Fahad Al Saad; Khalid Al Nabhani / Mohammed Al Nabhani	2; 6	5; 7

Oman and Vietnam promoted to Group III for 2004. The remaining matches were not played, since they could not have changed the outcome.

== Final standings ==
Rank	Team
1	Vietnam
2	Oman
3	Saudi Arabia
4	Myanmar
5	Sri Lanka
6	Singapore
7	Bangladesh
8	Brunei

- Vietnam and Oman promoted to Group III in 2004.
