= Ramin Raziani =

Iranian tennis player

Ramin Raziani رامین رضیانی
- Country (sports): Iran
- Born: April 12, 1974 (age 51) Tehran, Iran
- Plays: Right-handed (one-handed backhand)

Singles
- Highest ranking: No. 1066 (28 October 1996)

Ramin Raziani (Persian: رامین رضیانی) (born April 12, 1974) is an Iranian tennis player, coach and entrepreneur.

== Biography ==
At the age of four, Raziani started playing tennis. For ten years, Raziani has been ranked the number one player in Iran, and also a former Asian champion. In his career, Raziani made 16 doubles finals, and has won 28 international tournaments, including the Satellite tournament and Challenger tournament. In 2010 he achieved a career-high of 147 in the ITF rankings.

He was captain and player for the Iranian Davis Cup team from 1991–2005, played first league for Italy in 1993–1995 and played in the Asian Olympics in 1994 and 1998.

In addition to being a coach at Mayfair Fitness and Racquet clubs in Toronto and the Raziani Tennis Academy, has also started a high-end waterless carwash company called Ecomobile Auto Spa.
