= Jicham Zaatini =

Lebanese tennis player (born 1976)

- Country (sports): Lebanon
- Born: 17 July 1976 (age 49) Maracay, Venezuela
- Plays: Right-handed
- Prize money: $16,138

Singles
- Career record: 11–15 (at ATP Tour level, Grand Slam level, and in Davis Cup)
- Career titles: 0
- Highest ranking: No. 502 (10 August 1998)

Doubles
- Career record: 13–6 (at ATP Tour level, Grand Slam level, and in Davis Cup)
- Career titles: 0
- Highest ranking: No. 278 (14 August 2000)
- Last updated on: 2 July 2018.

Jicham Zaatini (born 17 July 1976) is a former Lebanese tennis player.

Zaatini has a career high ATP singles ranking of 502 achieved on 10 August 1998. He also has a career high ATP doubles ranking of 278 achieved on 14 August 2000. Zaatini represented Lebanon at the Davis Cup, where he has a W/L record of 24–20.
