= Melvin Tong =

Hong Kong tennis player

- Full name: Melvin Tong Man-chung
- Country (sports): Hong Kong
- Born: 19 February 1975 (age 50)
- Plays: Right-handed
- Prize money: $10,511

Singles
- Career record: 0–2 (ATP Tour)
- Highest ranking: No. 913 (16 Oct 2000)

Doubles
- Career record: 0–2 (ATP Tour)
- Highest ranking: No. 997 (16 Oct 2000)

Melvin Tong Man-chung (born 19 February 1975) is a Hong Kong former professional tennis player.

== Tennis career ==
Tong represented Hong Kong at the 1998 Asian Games and was a doubles bronze medalist at the 2001 National Games of China, partnering John Hui. Between 1994 and 2002 he featured in 15 Davis Cup ties for Hong Kong.

On the ATP Tour he received a wildcard to compete in the singles main draw at the Hong Kong Open in both 1997 and 2000. In the 1997 edition he lost his first round match to world number three Michael Chang.

An at times temperamental player, Tong received a one-year ban by South China Athletic Association in 1999, following his verbal abuse of a female umpire at the Coca-Cola Open, during a match where he was also accused of deliberately hitting a linesman twice with his serves.
