= Ali Hamadeh =

Lebanese American tennis player

- Country (sports): Lebanon
- Born: 5 September 1974 (age 51) Memphis, Tennessee; United States
- Height: 1.86 m (6 ft 1 in)
- Turned pro: 1996
- Plays: Right-handed
- Prize money: $29,345

Doubles
- Career record: 5–10
- Career titles: Winner 1 ATP Challenger Finalist 3 ATP Challengers
- Highest ranking: No. 153 (2 Aug 1999)

Grand Slam doubles results
- US Open: 2R (1995) Q (1999)

Ali Hamadeh (born 5 September 1974) is an American former professional tennis player. He is a native of Memphis, Tennessee and represented Lebanon through his dual citizenship.

Hamadeh, a University of Mississippi collegiate player, partnered with Mahesh Bhupathi to win the NCAA doubles championship in 1995. He was a two-time All-American and three-time All SEC during his collegiate career. He was ranked #1 in the NCAA Doubles National Rankings (1995) and #6 in the NCAA Singles National Rankings (1996). He won the 1994 SEC Doubles Championships with Joakim Appleqvist.

Professionally, Hamadeh held a world ranking of 153 in doubles. He partnered with Bhupathi at the 1995 US Open and they defeated the combination of Mark Keil and Peter Nyborg in the opening round.

Hamadeh represented Lebanon in 20 Davis Cup ties and won a record 30 rubbers.

== Challenger titles ==
=== Doubles: (1) ===
No.	Year	Tournament	Surface	Partner	Opponents	Score
1.	1998	Guadalajara, Mexico	Clay	(Netherlands) Sander Groen	(Argentina) Martín García (Argentina) Sebastián Prieto	6–4, 6–2
