= Michael Brown (tennis) =

Australian tennis player

- Full name: Michael Brown
- Country (sports): Australia; Hong Kong
- Born: April 1971 (age 54) Wollongong, Australia
- Prize money: $22,903

Singles
- Career record: 0–1
- Highest ranking: No. 253 (11 May 1992)

Grand Slam singles results
- Australian Open: 1R (1990)

Doubles
- Career record: 1–3
- Highest ranking: No. 203 (18 May 1992)

Grand Slam doubles results
- Australian Open: 1R (1991)

Michael Brown (born April 1971) is a former professional tennis player from Australia. He played Davis Cup tennis for Hong Kong.

== Biography ==
Brown, who comes from Wollongong, was the 1987 Australian School Boys champion. He made the boys' singles quarter-finals at the 1989 Australian Open and turned professional later that year.

Coached by Terry Rocavert, he made the men's singles main draw of the 1990 Australian Open after making it through qualifying and was beaten in the first round by Karel Nováček, over four sets. As a doubles player he was most successful in his partnership with Andrew Kratzmann, with whom he made the main draw twice at the Sydney Indoor, including a second round appearance in 1990. The pair also competed together as wildcards in the men's doubles at the 1991 Australian Open. He won two Challenger doubles titles, one with Kratzmann in Hobart in 1991 and the other partnering Roger Rasheed in Antwerp in 1992.

While living in Hong Kong he was called up to play for their Davis Cup team and appeared in a total of six ties from 2001 to 2004.

== Challenger titles ==
=== Doubles: (2) ===
No.	Year	Tournament	Surface	Partner	Opponents	Score
1.	1991	Hobart, Australia	Carpet	(Australia) Andrew Kratzmann	(Australia) Bret Richardson (Australia) Simon Youl	3–6, 6–3, 7–6
2.	1992	Antwerp, Belgium	Clay	(Australia) Roger Rasheed	(Sweden) Mikael Pernfors (Belgium) Kris Goossens	6–2, 6–4
