= John Hui (tennis) =

Hong Kong tennis player (born 1978)

- Full name: John Hui Kin-yip
- Country (sports): Hong Kong
- Born: 3 January 1978 (age 47)
- Plays: Right-handed
- Prize money: $23,562

Singles
- Career record: 0–2 (ATP Tour)
- Highest ranking: No. 987 (8 Oct 2001)

Doubles
- Career record: 1–4 (ATP Tour)
- Highest ranking: No. 157 (12 Aug 2002)

Chinese name
- Traditional Chinese: 許建業
- Hanyu Pinyin: Xǔ Jiànyè
- Jyutping: Heoi2 Gin3jip6

John Hui Kin-yip (born 3 January 1978) is a Hong Kong former professional tennis player.

Following a collegiate career with Pepperdine University, Hui turned professional in the early 2000s and competed primarily as a doubles player, with a career high ranking of 157 in the world.

Hui, who was a top-100 junior, twice featured in the singles main draw of the ATP Tour's Hong Kong Open, losing his first round matches to Pat Rafter in 1996 and Marat Safin in 2001. He was doubles runner-up in two ATP Challenger tournaments and reached the doubles quarter-finals at the 2001 Heineken Open Shanghai (beating the second seeds en route).

A doubles bronze medalist at the 2001 National Games of China (with Melvin Tong), Hui was a Hong Kong representative at the 2002 Asian Games in Busan and played in 14 Davis Cup ties for Hong Kong. In his Davis Cup career, he won a total of three singles and five doubles rubbers.

In 2003, he married Jacklyn Fu, a former tennis player on the international junior circuit, with whom he has 3 children, Brian, Nicola, and Alex.

Hui is part of one of Hong Kong's four big families, headed by Hui Oi Chow.
