= Yu Hiu Tung =

Hong Kong tennis player

Yu Hiu Tung 余曉東
- Country (sports): Hong Kong
- Residence: Hong Kong, China
- Born: 5 February 1984 (age 41) Hong Kong, China
- Turned pro: 2002
- Plays: Left-handed
- Prize money: $9,041

Singles
- Career record: 11-14
- Career titles: 0; 0 Challenger, 0 Futures
- Highest ranking: No. 910 (13 June 2005)

Doubles
- Career record: 1-4
- Career titles: 0; 0 Challenger, 1 Futures
- Highest ranking: No. 887 (28 August 2006)
- Last updated on: 3 November 2021.

Yu Hiu Tung (Chinese: 余曉東; pinyin: Yú Xiǎodōng; Jyutping: jyu^{4} hiu^{2} dung^{1}; born 5 February 1984) is a professional tennis player from Hong Kong. The left-hander Yu is a member of the Hong Kong Davis Cup team, compiling an 8-12 record in Davis Cup action since 2002.

Yu started playing tennis at age six. He quickly emerged as one of Hong Kong's most highly touted junior players. Highlights of his junior career include ascending to a #70 junior world ranking.

Yu reached his career-high ATP ranking of #910 in the world on 13 June 2005. At the 2006 Asian Games, Yu won his first round singles match against Bhutan's Deepesh Chhetri, but lost in the second round to Taiwanese Wang Yeu-tzuoo. In doubles, he and Wong Wing Luen lost to former World No.1s and eventual gold medalists Mahesh Bhupathi and Leander Paes.

In 2007, Yu gave up his professional tennis career, and began study towards an associate degree at HKU Space. He continues to play Davis Cup. On 2 May 2008, he was the 29th person to carry the olympic torch in the 2008 Olympics torch relay leg in Hong Kong.

== ATP Challenger and ITF Futures finals ==
=== Doubles: 2 (1–1) ===
Legend ATP Challenger (0–0) ITF Futures (1–1)	Finals by surface Hard (1–1) Clay (0–0) Grass (0–0) Carpet (0–0)

Result	W–L	Date	Tournament	Tier	Surface	Partner	Opponents	Score
Loss	0–1	Mar 2006	China F3, Shenzhen	Futures	Hard	(Chinese Taipei) Lee Hsin-Han	(Netherlands) Jesse Huta Galung (Netherlands) Antal Van Der Duim	5–7, 1–6
Win	1–1	Aug 2006	Indonesia F2, Jakarta	Futures	Hard	(Chinese Taipei) Lee Hsin-Han	(Chinese Taipei) Chang Huai-En (Chinese Taipei) Hsieh Wang-Cheng	6–2, 3–6, 7–6^{(7–4)}
