= Anoosha Shahgholi =

Iranian tennis player

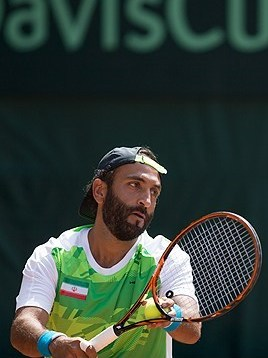
- Country (sports): Iran
- Born: 10 November 1981 (age 44) Tehran, Iran
- Retired: 2019 (last match)
- Plays: Right-handed
- Prize money: $21,650

Singles
- Career record: 27–16 (at ATP Tour level, Grand Slam level, and in Davis Cup)
- Career titles: 0 ITF
- Highest ranking: No. 847 (7 May 2007)

Doubles
- Career record: 11–11 (at ATP Tour level, Grand Slam level, and in Davis Cup)
- Career titles: 2 ITF
- Highest ranking: No. 719 (10 July 2006)
- Last updated on: 6 April 2018.

Anoosha Shahgholi (born 10 November 1981) is an Iranian inactive tennis player.

Shahgholi has a career high ATP singles ranking of 847 achieved on 7 May 2007. He also has a career high ATP doubles ranking of 719 achieved on 10 July 2006.

Shahgholi represents Iran at the Davis Cup where he has a W/L record of 38–27.

== Future and Challenger finals ==
=== Doubles 3 (2–1) ===
Legend
Challengers 0 (0–0)
Futures 3 (2–1)

Outcome	No.	Date	Tournament	Surface	Partner	Opponents	Score
Winner	1.	August 21, 2005	Tehran, Iran F2	Clay	(Iran) Ashkan Shokoofi	(Pakistan) Aqeel Khan (Pakistan) Asim Shafik	6–4, 6–4
Runner-up	2.	September 18, 2005	Tehran, Iran F3	Clay	(Iran) Ashkan Shokoofi	(Austria) Philipp Müllner (Austria) Herbert Wiltschnig	2–6, 4–6
Winner	3.	August 27, 2006	Tehran, Iran F3	Clay	(Iran) Ashkan Shokoofi	(Germany) Bastian Knittel (Germany) Nils Muschiol	6–3, 6–4
