= Ashkan Shokoofi =

Iranian tennis player

- Country (sports): Iran
- Born: 9 July 1981 (age 44) Tehran, Iran
- Retired: 2018 (last match)
- Plays: Right-handed
- Prize money: $12,599

Singles
- Career record: 7–6 (at ATP Tour level, Grand Slam level, and in Davis Cup)
- Career titles: 0 ITF
- Highest ranking: No. 861 (4 October 2004)

Doubles
- Career record: 2–9 (at ATP Tour level, Grand Slam level, and in Davis Cup)
- Career titles: 2 ITF
- Highest ranking: No. 719 (10 July 2006)
- Last updated on: 19 August 2019.

Ashkan Shokoofi (born 9 July 1981) is an Iranian inactive tennis player.

Shokoofi has a career high ATP singles ranking of 861 achieved on 4 October 2004. He also has a career high ATP doubles ranking of 719 achieved on 10 July 2006.

Shokoofi represents Iran at the Davis Cup where he has a W/L record of 24–25.

== Future and Challenger finals ==
=== Doubles 3 (2–1) ===
Legend
Challengers 0 (0–0)
Futures 3 (2–1)

Outcome	No.	Date	Tournament	Surface	Partner	Opponents	Score
Winner	1.	21 August 2005	Tehran, Iran F2	Clay	(Iran) Anoosha Shahgholi	(Pakistan) Aqeel Khan (Pakistan) Asim Shafik	6–4, 6–4
Runner-up	2.	18 September 2005	Tehran, Iran F3	Clay	(Iran) Anoosha Shahgholi	(Austria) Philipp Müllner (Austria) Herbert Wiltschnig	2–6, 4–6
Winner	3.	27 August 2006	Tehran, Iran F3	Clay	(Iran) Anoosha Shahgholi	(Germany) Bastian Knittel (Germany) Nils Muschiol	6–3, 6–4
