= 2017 Davis Cup Asia/Oceania Zone Group II =

International tennis competition

The Asia/Oceania Zone was one of the three zones of the regional Davis Cup competition in 2017.

In the Asia/Oceania Zone there were four different tiers, called groups, in which teams competed against each other to advance to the upper tier. Winners in Group II advanced to the Asia/Oceania Zone Group I. Teams who lost their respective ties competed in the relegation play-offs, with winning teams remaining in Group II, whereas teams who lost their play-offs were relegated to the Asia/Oceania Zone Group III in 2018.

== Participating nations ==
Seeds:

1. Pakistan
2. Thailand
3. Philippines
4. Vietnam

Remaining nations:

- Hong Kong
- Indonesia
- Iran
- Kuwait

=== Draw ===
Play-offs
Isfahan, Iran (clay)
Iran	5
Vietnam	0
Surakarta, Indonesia (hard)
Indonesia	4
Kuwait	1

First Round
Islamabad, Pakistan (hard)
1	Pakistan	3
Iran	2
Ho Chi Minh City, Vietnam (hard)
4	Vietnam	2
Hong Kong	3
Manila, Philippines (indoor clay)
Indonesia	1
3	Philippines	4
Mishref, Kuwait (hard)
Kuwait	1
2	Thailand	3

Second Round
Islamabad, Pakistan (grass)
1	Pakistan	w/o
Hong Kong
Nonthaburi, Thailand (hard)
3	Philippines	0
2	Thailand	5

Third Round
Islamabad, Pakistan (grass)
1	Pakistan	3
2	Thailand	2

- Vietnam and Kuwait relegated to Group III in 2018.
- Pakistan promoted to Group I in 2018.

== First round ==
=== Pakistan vs. Iran ===
Pakistan
3
Pakistan Sports Complex, Islamabad, Pakistan
3–5 February 2017
Hard

Iran
2

			1	2	3	4	5
1	(Pakistan) (Iran)	Aqeel Khan; Shahin Khaledan	7^{7} 6^{1}	6; 4	6; 2
2	(Pakistan) (Iran)	Aisam-ul-Haq Qureshi; Anoosha Shahgholi	6; 1	6; 2	6; 2
3	(Pakistan) (Iran)	Aqeel Khan / Aisam-ul-Haq Qureshi; Alborz Akhavan / Anoosha Shahgholi	6; 1	6; 2	6; 2
4	(Pakistan) (Iran)	Mohammad Abid Ali Khan Akbar; Hamid Reza Nadaf	7^{7} 6^{4}	4; 6	3; 6
5	(Pakistan) (Iran)	Muhammad Abid; Shahin Khaledan	6^{8} 7^{10}	3; 6

=== Vietnam vs. Hong Kong ===
Vietnam
2
Phu Tho Tennis Club, Ho Chi Minh City, Vietnam
3–5 February 2017
Hard

Hong Kong
3

			1	2	3	4	5
1	(Vietnam) (Hong Kong)	Nguyễn Hoàng Thiên; Wong Hong Kit	7^{7} 6^{4}	5; 7	4; 6	6; 3	0; 6
2	(Vietnam) (Hong Kong)	Lý Hoàng Nam; Hei Yin Andrew Li	6; 1	6; 2	6; 4
3	(Vietnam) (Hong Kong)	Lý Hoàng Nam / Nguyễn Hoàng Thiên; Karan Rastogi / Wong Chun Hun	7^{9} 6^{7}	4; 6	6^{4} 7^{7}	1; 6
4	(Vietnam) (Hong Kong)	Lý Hoàng Nam; Wong Hong Kit	6; 3	7^{10} 6^{8}	6; 4
5	(Vietnam) (Hong Kong)	Nguyễn Hoàng Thiên; Karan Rastogi	7^{7} 6^{4}	1; 6	2; 6	1; 6

=== Philippines vs. Indonesia ===
Philippines
4
Philippine Columbian Association, Manila, Philippines
3–5 February 2017
Clay (i)

Indonesia
1

			1	2	3	4	5
1	(Philippines) (Indonesia)	Alberto Lim; David Agung Susanto	6; 3	6; 2	2; 6	1; 6	1; 1	retired
2	(Philippines) (Indonesia)	Ruben Gonzales; Aditya Hari Sasongko	6; 2	6; 2	6; 4
3	(Philippines) (Indonesia)	Francis Casey Alcantara / Treat Huey; David Agung Susanto / Sunu-Wahyu Trijati	6; 2	6; 4	6; 4
4	(Philippines) (Indonesia)	Ruben Gonzales; David Agung Susanto	6; 2	6; 3	6; 4
5	(Philippines) (Indonesia)	Alberto Lim; Anthony Susanto	7; 5	6; 3

=== Kuwait vs. Thailand ===
Kuwait
1
Kuwait Tennis Federation Centre, Mishref, Kuwait
3–5 February 2017
Hard

Thailand
3

			1	2	3	4	5
1	(Kuwait) (Thailand)	Abdullah Maqdes; Jirat Navasirisomboon	2; 6	4; 6	7^{7} 6^{4}	4; 6
2	(Kuwait) (Thailand)	Mohammad Ghareeb; Wishaya Trongcharoenchaikul	6; 4	3; 6	6; 3	6^{3} 7^{7}	6; 0
3	(Kuwait) (Thailand)	Abdulrahman Alawadhi / Abdulhamid Mubarak; Sanchai Ratiwatana / Sonchat Ratiwatana	2; 6	0; 6	3; 6
4	(Kuwait) (Thailand)	Abdullah Maqdes; Wishaya Trongcharoenchaikul	4; 6	2; 6	7; 5	6; 4	6^{3} 7^{7}
5	(Kuwait) (Thailand)	Mohammad Ghareeb; Jirat Navasirisomboon						not played

== Second round ==
=== Pakistan vs. Hong Kong ===
Pakistan
w/o
Naval Sports Complex, Islamabad, Pakistan
7–9 April
Grass

Hong Kong

			1	2	3	4	5
1	(Pakistan) (Hong Kong)	N/A; N/A						not played
2	(Pakistan) (Hong Kong)	N/A; N/A						not played
3	(Pakistan) (Hong Kong)	N/A; N/A						not played
4	(Pakistan) (Hong Kong)	N/A; N/A						not played
5	(Pakistan) (Hong Kong)	N/A; N/A						not played

- Hong Kong withdrew from the tie citing security concerns.

=== Thailand vs. Philippines ===
Thailand
5
The National Tennis Development Center, Nonthaburi, Thailand
7–9 April
Hard

Philippines
0

			1	2	3	4	5
1	(Thailand) (Philippines)	Wishaya Trongcharoenchaikul; Alberto Lim	7^{7} 6^{2}	6; 4	6; 3
2	(Thailand) (Philippines)	Jirat Navasirisomboon; Jeson Patrombon	2; 6	7^{7} 6^{4}	6; 1	6; 1
3	(Thailand) (Philippines)	Sanchai Ratiwatana / Sonchat Ratiwatana; Jeson Patrombon / Patrick-John Tierro	6; 1	6; 4	6; 2
4	(Thailand) (Philippines)	Wishaya Trongcharoenchaikul; Patrick-John Tierro	6; 4	6; 1
5	(Thailand) (Philippines)	Jirat Navasirisomboon; Alberto Lim	6; 4	6; 2

== Play-offs ==
=== Iran vs. Vietnam ===
Iran
5
Isfahan Center Tennis Complex, Isfahan, Iran
7–9 April
Clay

Vietnam
0

			1	2	3	4	5
1	(Iran) (Vietnam)	Shahin Khaledan; Phạm Minh Tuấn	6; 2	6; 4	6; 0
2	(Iran) (Vietnam)	Hamid Reza Nadaf; Nguyễn Hoàng Thiên	5; 4					retired
3	(Iran) (Vietnam)	Amirvala Madanchi / Ashkan Shokoofi; Lê Quốc Khánh / Phạm Minh Tuấn	6; 4	6; 4	6; 4
4	(Iran) (Vietnam)	Amirvala Madanchi; Lê Quốc Khánh	6; 3	6; 2
5	(Iran) (Vietnam)	Hamid Reza Nadaf; Phạm Minh Tuấn	6; 3	6; 3

=== Indonesia vs. Kuwait ===
Indonesia
4
Manahan Stadium, Surakarta, Indonesia
7–9 April
Hard

Kuwait
1

			1	2	3	4	5
1	(Indonesia) (Kuwait)	Anthony Susanto; Abdullah Maqdes	4; 6	6; 4	6; 3	0; 6	0; 6
2	(Indonesia) (Kuwait)	Christopher Rungkat; Mohammad Ghareeb	6; 3	6; 2	6; 0
3	(Indonesia) (Kuwait)	Christopher Rungkat / Sunu-Wahyu Trijati; Mohammad Ghareeb / Abdullah Maqdes	7^{7} 6^{5}	6; 4	6; 3
4	(Indonesia) (Kuwait)	Christopher Rungkat; Abdullah Maqdes	6; 1	6; 3	6; 2
5	(Indonesia) (Kuwait)	Anthony Susanto; Abdulrahman Alawadhi	6; 4	6; 4

== Third round ==
=== Pakistan vs. Thailand ===
Pakistan
3
Naval Sports Complex, Islamabad, Pakistan
15–17 September
Grass

Thailand
2

			1	2	3	4	5
1	(Pakistan) (Thailand)	Aqeel Khan; Wishaya Trongcharoenchaikul	6; 3	6; 4	6; 4
2	(Pakistan) (Thailand)	Aisam-ul-Haq Qureshi; Kittipong Wachiramanowong	6; 1	6; 0	6; 4
3	(Pakistan) (Thailand)	Muhammad Abid / Shahzad Khan; Sanchai Ratiwatana / Sonchat Ratiwatana	6; 4	4; 6	1; 6	1; 6
4	(Pakistan) (Thailand)	Aisam-ul-Haq Qureshi; Wishaya Trongcharoenchaikul	5; 7	6^{4} 7^{7}	6; 4	7^{7} 6^{3}	6^{3} 7^{7}
5	(Pakistan) (Thailand)	Aqeel Khan; Kittipong Wachiramanowong	6; 4	6; 3	3; 6	2; 6	6; 2
