= 2015 Davis Cup Asia/Oceania Zone Group II =

International tennis competition

The Asia/Oceania Zone is one of the three zones of regional Davis Cup competition in 2015.

== Participating nations ==
Seeds:

1. Chinese Taipei
2. Pakistan
3. Philippines
4. Indonesia

Remaining nations:

- Iran
- Kuwait
- Lebanon
- Sri Lanka

=== Draw ===
Play-offs
Colombo, Sri Lanka (clay)
Lebanon	2
Sri Lanka	3
Tehran, Iran (clay)
Iran	1
Kuwait	3

First Round
Kaohsiung, Taiwan (hard)
1	Chinese Taipei	5
Lebanon	0
Pasig, Philippines (indoor clay)
3	Philippines	5
Sri Lanka	0
Palembang, Indonesia (hard)
Iran	0
4	Indonesia	5
Colombo, Sri Lanka (clay)
Kuwait	2
2	Pakistan	3

Second Round
Kaohsiung, Chinese Taipei (hard)
1	Chinese Taipei	3
3	Philippines	1
Jakarta, Indonesia (hard)
4	Indonesia	1
2	Pakistan	3

Third Round
İzmir, Turkey (hard)
1	Chinese Taipei	2
2	Pakistan	3

- Lebanon and Iran relegated to Group III in 2016.
- Pakistan promoted to Group I in 2016.

== First round ==
=== Chinese Taipei vs. Lebanon ===
Chinese Taipei
5
Kaohsiung Yangming Tennis Courts, Kaohsiung, Chinese Taipei
6 – 8 March 2015
Hard

Lebanon
0

			1	2	3	4	5
1	(Chinese Taipei) (Lebanon)	Lu Yen-hsun; Ibrahim Abou Chahine	6; 0	6; 0	6; 1
2	(Chinese Taipei) (Lebanon)	Hung Jui-chen; Karim Alayli	6; 0	6; 1	6; 1
3	(Chinese Taipei) (Lebanon)	Ho Chih-Jen / Wang Chieh-fu; Karim Alayli / Nour Nehme	6; 1	6; 4	6; 2
4	(Chinese Taipei) (Lebanon)	Wang Chieh-fu; Nour Nehme	6; 0	6; 2
5	(Chinese Taipei) (Lebanon)	Hung Jui-chen; Ibrahim Abou Chahine	6; 0	6; 0

=== Philippines vs. Sri Lanka ===
Philippines
5
Valle Verde Country Club, Pasig, Philippines
6 – 8 March 2015
Clay

Sri Lanka
0

			1	2	3	4	5
1	(Philippines) (Sri Lanka)	Patrick-John Tierro; Harshana Godamanna	5; 7	3; 6	6; 4	6; 0	6; 3
2	(Philippines) (Sri Lanka)	Ruben Gonzales; Sharmal Dissanayake	6; 3	6; 2	6; 1
3	(Philippines) (Sri Lanka)	Francis Casey Alcantara / Treat Conrad Huey; Sharmal Dissanayake / Dineshkanthan Thangarajah	3; 6	6; 3	6; 2	6; 4
4	(Philippines) (Sri Lanka)	Treat Conrad Huey; Sharmal Dissanayake	6; 1	6; 3	6; 1
5	(Philippines) (Sri Lanka)	Francis Casey Alcantara; Dineshkanthan Thangarajah	6; 2	6; 3

=== Indonesia vs. Iran ===
Indonesia
5
Bukit Asam Tennis Court, Palembang, Indonesia
6 – 8 March 2015
Hard

Iran
0

			1	2	3	4	5
1	(Indonesia) (Iran)	Christopher Rungkat; Shahin Khaledan	6; 2	6; 1	6; 0
2	(Indonesia) (Iran)	Sunu Wahyu Trijati; Anousha Shahgholi	6; 3	6; 1	6; 0
3	(Indonesia) (Iran)	Christopher Rungkat / David Agung Susanto; Amir Vala Madanchi / Anousha Shahgholi	6; 0	6; 4	6; 1
4	(Indonesia) (Iran)	David Agung Susanto; Mohsen Hosseinzadeh	6; 4	6; 4
5	(Indonesia) (Iran)	Aditya Hari Sasongko; Shahin Khaledan	6; 2	6; 1

=== Pakistan vs. Kuwait ===
Pakistan
3
Sri Lanka Tennis Association Complex, Colombo, Sri Lanka^{[a]}
6 – 8 March 2015
Clay

Kuwait
2

			1	2	3	4	5
1	(Pakistan) (Kuwait)	Aisam-ul-Haq Qureshi; Naser Al Obaidly	6; 1	6; 0	6; 2
2	(Pakistan) (Kuwait)	Aqeel Khan; Mohammad Ghareeb	4; 6	1; 6	1; 6
3	(Pakistan) (Kuwait)	Aqeel Khan / Aisam-ul-Haq Qureshi; Hassan Al Mousa / Dawood Sayed Hashim	6; 3	3; 6	6; 3	6; 1
4	(Pakistan) (Kuwait)	Mohammad Abid Ali Khan Akbar; Mohammad Ghareeb	7^{7} 6^{5}	3; 6	6; 1	3; 6	2; 6
5	(Pakistan) (Kuwait)	Aqeel Khan; Dawood Sayed Hashim	6; 2	6; 1	6; 2

== Second round ==
=== Chinese Taipei vs. Philippines ===
Chinese Taipei
3
Kaohsiung Yangming Tennis Courts, Kaohsiung, Chinese Taipei
17 – 19 July 2015
Hard

Philippines
1

			1	2	3	4	5
1	(Chinese Taipei) (Philippines)	Hung Jui-chen; Jeson Patrombon	6; 2	6; 2	6; 1
2	(Chinese Taipei) (Philippines)	Lu Yen-hsun; Patrick-John Tierro	6; 2	6; 2	6; 1
3	(Chinese Taipei) (Philippines)	Lee Hsin-han / Peng Hsien-yin; Ruben Gonzales / Treat Conrad Huey	3; 6	6^{4} 7^{7}	6^{3} 7^{7}
4	(Chinese Taipei) (Philippines)	Lu Yen-hsun; Ruben Gonzales	6; 2	6; 2	6; 4
5	(Chinese Taipei) (Philippines)	Hung Jui-chen; Patrick-John Tierro						not played

=== Indonesia vs. Pakistan ===
Indonesia
1
Gelora Bung Karno Tennis Stadium, Jakarta, Indonesia
14 – 16 July 2015
Hard

Pakistan
3

			1	2	3	4	5
1	(Indonesia) (Pakistan)	Aditya Hari Sasongko; Aqeel Khan	6; 2	3; 6	5; 7	0; 6
2	(Indonesia) (Pakistan)	David Agung Susanto; Samir Iftikhar	6; 3	7^{7} 6^{3}	4; 6	5; 7	0; 6
3	(Indonesia) (Pakistan)	Christopher Rungkat / Sunu-Wahyu Trijati; Mohammad Abid Ali Khan Akbar / Aqeel Khan	4; 6	7; 5	6; 3	3; 6	6; 3
4	(Indonesia) (Pakistan)	David Agung Susanto; Aqeel Khan	0; 6	6^{2} 7^{7}	6; 0	2; 6
5	(Indonesia) (Pakistan)	Aditya Hari Sasongko; Samir Iftikhar						not played

== Play-off ==
=== Sri Lanka vs. Lebanon ===
Sri Lanka
3
Sri Lanka Tennis Association Complex, Colombo, Sri Lanka
17 – 19 July 2015
Clay

Lebanon
2

			1	2	3	4	5
1	(Sri Lanka) (Lebanon)	Sharmal Dissanayake; Jad Ballout	6; 3	6; 2	2; 1			retired
2	(Sri Lanka) (Lebanon)	Harshana Godamanna; Hady Habib	7; 5	6; 3	6; 3
3	(Sri Lanka) (Lebanon)	Harshana Godamanna / Dineshkanthan Thangarajah; Hady Habib / Giovani Samaha	6^{4} 7^{7}	6; 2	3; 6	6; 3	3; 6
4	(Sri Lanka) (Lebanon)	Sharmal Dissanayake; Hady Habib	5; 7	4; 6	6; 4	6; 4	3; 6
5	(Sri Lanka) (Lebanon)	Harshana Godamanna; Giovani Samaha	6; 3	6; 2	6; 3

=== Iran vs. Kuwait ===
Iran
1
OPT Tennis Club, Tehran, Iran
17 – 19 July 2015
Clay

Kuwait
3

			1	2	3	4	5
1	(Iran) (Kuwait)	Shahin Khaledan; Abdullah Maqdes	4; 6	6; 2	6; 0	7; 5
2	(Iran) (Kuwait)	Mohsen Hosseinzadeh; Mohammad Al-Ghareeb	6; 2	6^{2} 7^{7}	3; 6	4; 6
3	(Iran) (Kuwait)	Anousha Shahgholi / Omid Souri; Mohammad Al-Ghareeb / Abdullah Maqdes	6^{4} 7^{7}	1; 6	0; 6
4	(Iran) (Kuwait)	Anousha Shahgholi; Abdullah Maqdes	0; 6	6^{1} 7^{7}	6; 4	2; 6
5	(Iran) (Kuwait)	Shahin Khaledan; Mohammad Al-Ghareeb						not played

== Third round ==
=== Pakistan vs. Chinese Taipei ===
Pakistan
3
Ulusal Tenis Egitim Merkezi Tennis Club, İzmir, Turkey^{[b]}
18 – 20 September 2015
Hard

Chinese Taipei
2

			1	2	3	4	5
1	(Pakistan) (Chinese Taipei)	Aqeel Khan; Hung Jui-chen	5; 7	6; 4	6; 1	6; 4
2	(Pakistan) (Chinese Taipei)	Samir Iftikhar; Jimmy Wang	3; 6	2; 6	0; 6
3	(Pakistan) (Chinese Taipei)	Aqeel Khan / Aisam-ul-Haq Qureshi; Wang Chieh-fu / Jimmy Wang	6; 2	6; 3	3; 6	6; 3
4	(Pakistan) (Chinese Taipei)	Aqeel Khan; Wang Chieh-Fu	7^{7} 6^{2}	2; 6	6^{5} 7^{7}	6; 1	3; 6
5	(Pakistan) (Chinese Taipei)	Aisam-ul-Haq Qureshi; Hung Jui-chen	7^{7} 6^{3}	4; 6	6; 4	6; 3

== Notes ==
a. The tie was moved to Colombo due to security concerns.
b. The tie was moved to İzmir due to security concerns.
