= 2018 Davis Cup Asia/Oceania Zone Group II =

International tennis competition

The Asia/Oceania Zone was one of the three zones of the regional Davis Cup competition in 2018.

In the Asia/Oceania Zone there were four different tiers, called groups, in which teams competed against each other to advance to the upper tier. Winners in Group II advanced to the Asia/Oceania Zone Group I. Teams who lost their respective ties competed in the relegation play-offs, with winning teams remaining in Group II, whereas teams who lost their play-offs were relegated to the Asia/Oceania Zone Group III in 2019.

== Participating nations ==
Seeds:

1. Thailand
2. Chinese Taipei
3. Hong Kong
4. Philippines

Remaining nations:

- Indonesia
- Iran
- Lebanon
- Sri Lanka

=== Draw ===
Play-offs
Colombo, Sri Lanka (clay)
Sri Lanka	1
Indonesia	3
Taipei, Taiwan (indoor hard)
Iran	0
2	Chinese Taipei	4

First Round
Colombo, Sri Lanka (clay)
1	Thailand	3
Sri Lanka	2
Jakarta, Indonesia (indoor hard)
3	Philippines	4
Indonesia	1
Causeway Bay, Hong Kong (hard)
Iran	0
4	Hong Kong	4
Beirut, Lebanon (indoor hard)
Lebanon	3
2	Chinese Taipei	2

Second Round
Manila, Philippines (indoor clay)
1	Thailand	4
3	Philippines	1
Zouk Mosbeh, Lebanon (hard)
4	Hong Kong	1
Lebanon	3

Third Round
Nonthaburi, Thailand (hard)
1	Thailand	2
Lebanon	3

- Sri Lanka and Iran relegated to Group III in 2019.
- Lebanon promoted to Group I in 2019.

== First round ==
=== Sri Lanka vs. Thailand ===
Sri Lanka
2
Sri Lanka Tennis Association, Colombo, Sri Lanka
3–4 February
Clay

Thailand
3

			1	2	3
1	(Sri Lanka) (Thailand)	Sharmal Dissanayake; Jirat Navasirisomboon	6; 4	7; 5
2	(Sri Lanka) (Thailand)	Yasitha de Silva; Wishaya Trongcharoenchaikul	3; 6	3; 6
3	(Sri Lanka) (Thailand)	Yasitha de Silva / Sharmal Dissanayake; Palaphoom Kovapitukted / Sanchai Ratiwatana	6; 3	6; 4
4	(Sri Lanka) (Thailand)	Alex Fairbanks; Wishaya Trongcharoenchaikul	5; 7	0; 6
5	(Sri Lanka) (Thailand)	Yasitha de Silva; Jirat Navasirisomboon	5; 7	2; 6

=== Indonesia vs. Philippines ===
Indonesia
1
Gelora Bung Karno Sports Complex, Jakarta, Indonesia
3–4 February
Hard (outdoor)

Philippines
4

			1	2	3
1	(Indonesia) (Philippines)	Muhammad Althaf Dhaifullah; Alberto Lim	3; 6	2; 6
2	(Indonesia) (Philippines)	David Agung Susanto; Jeson Patrombon	6; 2	7; 5
3	(Indonesia) (Philippines)	Justin Barki / David Agung Susanto; Francis Alcantara / Jurence Zosimo Mendoza	6^{5} 7^{7}	3; 6
4	(Indonesia) (Philippines)	David Agung Susanto; Alberto Lim	3; 6	4; 6
5	(Indonesia) (Philippines)	Anthony Susanto; John Bryan Decasa Otico	3; 6	3; 6

=== Hong Kong vs. Iran ===
Hong Kong
4
Victoria Park Tennis Stadium, Causeway Bay, Hong Kong
3–4 February
Hard

Iran
0

			1	2	3
1	(Hong Kong) (Iran)	Anthony Jackie Tang; Shahin Khaledan	7^{7} 6^{1}	6; 4
2	(Hong Kong) (Iran)	Wong Hong-kit; Mohsen Hossein Zade	6; 2	6; 3
3	(Hong Kong) (Iran)	Wong Chun-hun / Yeung Pak-long; Anoosha Shahgholi / Ashkan Shokoofi	6; 2	6; 0
4	(Hong Kong) (Iran)	Skyler Butts; Amir Hossein Badi	6; 3	6; 0
5	(Hong Kong) (Iran)	Anthony Jackie Tang; Mohsen Hossein Zade				not played

=== Lebanon vs. Chinese Taipei ===
Lebanon
3
Taadod Sports Academy, Beirut, Lebanon
3–4 February
Hard (indoor)

Chinese Taipei
2

			1	2	3
1	(Lebanon) (Chinese Taipei)	Benjamin Hassan; Yu Cheng-yu	5; 7	6; 3	6; 4
2	(Lebanon) (Chinese Taipei)	Hady Habib; Lee Kuan-yi	6; 4	6; 3
3	(Lebanon) (Chinese Taipei)	Hady Habib / Giovani Samaha; Chen Ti / Yu Cheng-yu	6; 1	7; 5
4	(Lebanon) (Chinese Taipei)	Michel Saade; Tseng Chun-hsin	0; 6	0; 6
5	(Lebanon) (Chinese Taipei)	Jad Ballout; Chen Ti	1; 6	1; 6

== Second round ==
=== Philippines vs. Thailand ===
Philippines
1
Philippine Columbian Association, Manila, Philippines
7–8 April
Clay (i)

Thailand
4

			1	2	3
1	(Philippines) (Thailand)	Jeson Patrombon; Jirat Navasirisomboon	6; 2	6; 2
2	(Philippines) (Thailand)	John Bryan Decasa Otico; Wishaya Trongcharoenchaikul	3; 6	4; 6
3	(Philippines) (Thailand)	Francis Alcantara / Johnny Arcilla; Sanchai Ratiwatana / Sonchat Ratiwatana	6; 4	6^{3} 7^{7}	1; 6
4	(Philippines) (Thailand)	Jeson Patrombon; Wishaya Trongcharoenchaikul	4; 6	6; 1	5; 7
5	(Philippines) (Thailand)	John Bryan Decasa Otico; Palaphoom Kovapitukted	4; 6	3; 6

=== Lebanon vs. Hong Kong ===
Lebanon
3
Notre Dame University – Louaize, Zouk Mosbeh, Lebanon
7–8 April
Hard

Hong Kong
1

			1	2	3
1	(Lebanon) (Hong Kong)	Benjamin Hassan; Wong Hong-kit	6; 4	6; 1
2	(Lebanon) (Hong Kong)	Hady Habib; Wong Chun-hun	6; 4	1; 6	6; 4
3	(Lebanon) (Hong Kong)	Hady Habib / Giovani Samaha; Wong Chun-hun / Yeung Pak-long	2; 6	4; 6
4	(Lebanon) (Hong Kong)	Benjamin Hassan; Wong Chun-hun	7^{7} 6^{5}	6; 3
5	(Lebanon) (Hong Kong)	Hady Habib; Wong Hong-kit				not played

== Play-offs ==
=== Sri Lanka vs. Indonesia ===
Sri Lanka
1
Sri Lanka Tennis Association, Colombo, Sri Lanka
7–8 April
Clay

Indonesia
3

			1	2	3
1	(Sri Lanka) (Indonesia)	Sharmal Dissanayake; Christopher Rungkat	4; 6	6; 4	0; 3	retired
2	(Sri Lanka) (Indonesia)	Harshana Godamanna; David Agung Susanto	6; 3	6; 1
3	(Sri Lanka) (Indonesia)	Sharmal Dissanayake / Harshana Godamanna; Justin Barki / Christopher Rungkat	4; 6	3; 6
4	(Sri Lanka) (Indonesia)	Harshana Godamanna; Christopher Rungkat	4; 6	6; 4	6^{7} 7^{9}
5	(Sri Lanka) (Indonesia)	Sharmal Dissanayake; David Agung Susanto				not played

=== Chinese Taipei vs. Iran ===
Chinese Taipei
4
Taipei Tennis Center, Taipei, Taiwan
7–8 April
Hard (i)

Iran
0

			1	2	3
1	(Chinese Taipei) (Iran)	Jason Jung; Amirvala Madanchi	6; 3	6; 3
2	(Chinese Taipei) (Iran)	Yang Tsung-hua; Shahin Khaledan	6; 4	6; 3
3	(Chinese Taipei) (Iran)	Hsieh Cheng-peng / Peng Hsien-yin; Amirvala Madanchi / Ashkan Shokoofi	6; 0	6; 4
4	(Chinese Taipei) (Iran)	Hsu Yu-hsiou; Shahin Khaledan	4; 6	6; 1	10; 8
5	(Chinese Taipei) (Iran)	Yang Tsung-hua; Amirvala Madanchi				not played

== Third round ==
=== Thailand vs. Lebanon ===
Thailand
2
The National Tennis Development Center (LTAT), Nonthaburi, Thailand
15–16 September
Hard

Lebanon
3

			1	2	3
1	(Thailand) (Lebanon)	Wishaya Trongcharoenchaikul; Hady Habib	6; 4	6^{2} 7^{7}	3; 5	retired
2	(Thailand) (Lebanon)	Palaphoom Kovapitukted; Benjamin Hassan	3; 6	4; 6
3	(Thailand) (Lebanon)	Sanchai Ratiwatana / Sonchat Ratiwatana; Jad Ballout / Giovani Samaha	6; 0	6; 3
4	(Thailand) (Lebanon)	Wishaya Trongcharoenchaikul; Benjamin Hassan	6; 4	4; 6	6; 4
5	(Thailand) (Lebanon)	Palaphoom Kovapitukted; Hady Habib	3; 6	3; 6
