= 2010 Davis Cup Asia/Oceania Zone Group III =

International tennis competition

The Asian and Oceanian Zone is one of the three zones of regional Davis Cup competition in 2010.

In the Asian and Oceanian Zone there are four different groups in which teams compete against each other to advance to the next group.

== Format ==
There will be a Round Robin with eight teams. The eight nations will be divided into two pools of four. The top two teams in each pool will advance to the Final Pool of four teams from which the two highest-placed nations are promoted to Asia and Oceania Group II in 2010. The bottom two teams of each pool of the Round Robin will compete against each other in the Relegation Pool. The two lowest-placed nations are relegated to Asia and Oceania Group IV in 2010.

== Information ==
Venue: Enghelab Sports Complex, Tehran, Iran

Surface: clay – outdoors

Dates: 28 April – 2 May

== Participating teams ==
- Bangladesh
- Iran
- Lebanon
- Oman
- Saudi Arabia – Withdrew
- Singapore
- Syria
- Vietnam

== Pool A ==
		SYR	IRI	KUW
1	Syria (2–0)		2–1	3–0
2	Iran (1–1)	1–2		3–0
3	Kuwait (0–2)	0–3	0–3	
4				

=== Matches ===
==== Iran vs. Syria ====
Iran
1
Enghelab Sports Complex, Tehran, Iran
28 April 2010
clay (outdoors)

Syria
2

			1	2	3
1	(Iran) (Syria)	Ashkan Shokoofi; Romain Radwan	6; 3	4; 6	0; 3	retired
2	(Iran) (Syria)	Shahin Khaledan; Issam Haitham Taweel	7^{7} 6^{5}	6; 3
3	(Iran) (Syria)	Mohammad Mohazzabnia / Ashkan Shokoofi; Hayan Marouf / Majdi Salim	5; 7	6^{8} 7^{10}

==== Syria vs. Kuwait ====
Syria
3
Shiroudi Sports Complex, Tehran, Iran
29 April 2010
clay (indoors)

Kuwait
0

			1	2	3
1	(Syria) (Kuwait)	Romain Radwan; Ali Al-Ghareeb	2; 6	6; 3	6; 2
2	(Syria) (Kuwait)	Issam Haitham Taweel; Ahmad Rabeea Muhammad	6; 1	6; 2
3	(Syria) (Kuwait)	Hayan Marouf / Majdi Salim; Ali Ismaeel / Mohammad-Khaliq Siddiq				w/o

==== Iran vs. Kuwait ====
Iran
3
Enghelab Sports Complex, Tehran, Iran
30 April 2010
clay (outdoors)

Kuwait
0

			1	2	3
1	(Iran) (Kuwait)	Shahin Khaledan; Ali Al-Ghareeb	6; 1	6; 1
2	(Iran) (Kuwait)	Mohammad Mohazzabnia; Ali Ismaeel	7; 5	7; 5
3	(Iran) (Kuwait)	Mohsen Hosseinzadeh / Ashkan Shokoofi; Ali Al-Ghareeb / Ali Ismaeel	6; 1	7^{7} 6^{2}

== Pool B ==
		LIB	VIE	OMA	BAN
1	Lebanon (3–0)		2–1	2–1	2–1
2	Vietnam (2–1)	1–2		3–0	3–0
3	Oman (1–2)	1–2	0–3		2–1
4	Bangladesh (0–3)	1–2	0–3	1–2	

=== Matches ===
==== Bangladesh vs. Oman ====
Bangladesh
1
Enghelab Sports Complex, Tehran, Iran
28 April 2010
clay (outdoors)

Oman
2

			1	2	3
1	(Bangladesh) (Oman)	Shibu Lal; Mohammed Al-Nabhani	3; 6	1; 6
2	(Bangladesh) (Oman)	Sree-Amol Roy; Khalid Al-Nabhani	6; 4	7; 5
3	(Bangladesh) (Oman)	Ranjan Ram / Sree-Amol Roy; Khalid Al-Nabhani / Mohammed Al-Nabhani	6; 3	6^{1} 7^{7}	2; 6

==== Lebanon vs. Vietnam ====
Lebanon
2
Enghelab Sports Complex, Tehran, Iran
28 April 2010
clay (outdoors)

Vietnam
1

			1	2	3
1	(Lebanon) (Vietnam)	Karim Al-Ayly; Đỗ Minh Quân	6; 2	6; 2
2	(Lebanon) (Vietnam)	Michael Massih; Trần Thanh Hoàng	3; 6	1; 6
3	(Lebanon) (Vietnam)	Karim Al-Ayly / Patrick Chucri; Đỗ Minh Quân / Lê Quốc Khánh	6; 4	7^{8} 6^{6}

==== Lebanon vs. Oman ====
Lebanon
2
Esteghlal Tennis Courts, Tehran, Iran
29 April 2010
clay (indoors)

Oman
1

			1	2	3
1	(Lebanon) (Oman)	Karim Al-Ayly; Mohammed Al-Nabhani	6; 2	7^{8} 6^{6}
2	(Lebanon) (Oman)	Michael Massih; Khalid Al-Nabhani	3; 6	6; 3	3; 6
3	(Lebanon) (Oman)	Karim Al-Ayly / Patrick Chucri; Khalid Al-Nabhani / Mohammed Al-Nabhani	3; 6	7^{7} 6^{2}	6; 4

==== Bangladesh vs. Vietnam ====
Bangladesh
0
Esteghlal Tennis Courts, Tehran, Iran
29 April 2010
clay (indoors)

Vietnam
3

			1	2	3
1	(Bangladesh) (Vietnam)	Shibu Lal; Đỗ Minh Quân	2; 6	1; 6
2	(Bangladesh) (Vietnam)	Sree-Amol Roy; Trần Thanh Hoàng	0; 6	1; 6
3	(Bangladesh) (Vietnam)	Mohammed-Alamgir Hossain / Shibu Lal; Lê Quốc Khánh / Bùi Trí Nguyên	2; 6	4; 6

==== Vietnam vs. Oman ====
Vietnam
3
Enghelab Sports Complex, Tehran, Iran
30 April 2010
clay (outdoors)

Oman
0

			1	2	3
1	(Vietnam) (Oman)	Đỗ Minh Quân; Mohammed Al-Nabhani	6; 1	7^{7} 6^{3}
2	(Vietnam) (Oman)	Trần Thanh Hoàng; Khalid Al-Nabhani	6; 2	6; 4
3	(Vietnam) (Oman)	Lê Quốc Khánh / Bùi Trí Nguyên; Abdullah Al-Balushi / Mohammed Al-Nabhani	6; 3	5; 3		retired

==== Bangladesh vs. Lebanon ====
Bangladesh
1
Enghelab Sports Complex, Tehran, Iran
30 April 2010
clay (outdoors)

Lebanon
2

			1	2	3
1	(Bangladesh) (Lebanon)	Mohammed-Alamgir Hossain; Antoine Breikeh	4; 6	6; 4	6; 2
2	(Bangladesh) (Lebanon)	Ranjan Ram; Karim Al-Ayly	0; 6	3; 6
3	(Bangladesh) (Lebanon)	Mohammed-Alamgir Hossain / Shibu Lal; Antoine Breikeh / Michael Massih	5; 7	4; 6

== Promotion Pool ==
		SYR	IRI	LIB	VIE
1	Syria (2–1)		2–1	2–1	1–2
2	Iran (2–1)	1–2		2–0	2–0
3	Lebanon (1–2)	1–2	0–2		2–1
4	Vietnam (1–2)	2–1	0–2	1–2	

- Syria and Iran promoted to Group II in 2011.

=== Matches ===
==== Iran vs. Lebanon ====
Iran
2
Enghelab Sports Complex, Tehran, Iran
1 May 2010
clay (outdoors)

Lebanon
0

			1	2	3
1	(Iran) (Lebanon)	Shahin Khaledan; Patrick Chucri	6; 2	6; 2
2	(Iran) (Lebanon)	Mohammad Mohazzabnia; Karim Al-Ayly	7^{7} 6^{2}	2; 6	7; 5
3	(Iran) (Lebanon)	Mohsen Hosseinzadeh / Ashkan Shokoofi; Karim Al-Ayly / Patrick Chucri	2; 2			not completed

==== Vietnam vs. Syria ====
Vietnam
2
Enghelab Sports Complex, Tehran, Iran
1 May 2010
clay (outdoors)

Syria
1

			1	2	3
1	(Vietnam) (Syria)	Đỗ Minh Quân; Romain Radwan	3; 6	6; 3	6; 3
2	(Vietnam) (Syria)	Trần Thanh Hoàng; Issam Haitham Taweel	2; 6	1; 6
3	(Vietnam) (Syria)	Đỗ Minh Quân / Lê Quốc Khánh; Hayan Marouf / Majdi Salim	7^{10} 6^{8}	6; 2

==== Syria vs. Lebanon ====
Syria
2
Enghelab Sports Complex, Tehran, Iran
2 May 2010
clay (outdoors)

Lebanon
1

			1	2	3
1	(Syria) (Lebanon)	Romain Radwan; Karim Al-Ayly	4; 6	5; 7
2	(Syria) (Lebanon)	Issam Haitham Taweel; Michael Massih	6; 2	6; 1
3	(Syria) (Lebanon)	Hayan Marouf / Majdi Salim; Karim Al-Ayly / Patrick Chucri	7^{7} 6^{4}	7^{7} 6^{2}

==== Iran vs. Vietnam ====
Iran
2
Enghelab Sports Complex, Tehran, Iran
2 May 2010
clay (outdoors)

Vietnam
0

			1	2	3
1	(Iran) (Vietnam)	Shahin Khaledan; Đỗ Minh Quân	7^{7} 6^{4}	6; 3
2	(Iran) (Vietnam)	Mohammad Mohazzabnia; Trần Thanh Hoàng	6; 0	6; 2
3	(Iran) (Vietnam)

== Relegation Pool ==
		KUW	OMA	BAN
1	Kuwait (2–0)		2–0	2–0
2	Oman (1–1)	0–2		2–1
3	Bangladesh (0–2)	0–2	1–2	
4				

- Bangladesh (and Saudi Arabia) relegated to Group IV in 2011.

=== Matches ===
==== Kuwait vs. Bangladesh ====
Kuwait
2
Enghelab Sports Complex, Tehran, Iran
1 May 2010
clay (indoors)

Bangladesh
0

			1	2	3
1	(Kuwait) (Bangladesh)	Mohammad-Khaliq Siddiq; Ranjan Ram	6; 4	6; 1
2	(Kuwait) (Bangladesh)	Ali Al-Ghareeb; Shibu Lal	7^{7} 6^{3}	2; 6	7; 5
3	(Kuwait) (Bangladesh)

==== Kuwait vs. Oman ====
Kuwait
2
Enghelab Sports Complex, Tehran, Iran
2 May 2010
clay (indoors)

Oman
0

			1	2	3
1	(Kuwait) (Oman)	Ali Al-Ghareeb; Mohammed Al-Nabhani	6; 3	4; 6	6; 4
2	(Kuwait) (Oman)	Ali Al-Ghareeb; Ahmad Rabeea Muhammad	7^{7} 6^{4}	7^{7} 6^{5}
3	(Kuwait) (Oman)

== Final standings ==
Rank	Team
1	Syria
2	Iran
3	Lebanon
4	Vietnam
5	Kuwait
6	Oman
7	Bangladesh
8	Saudi Arabia (withdrew)

- Syria and Iran promoted to Group II in 2011.
- Bangladesh relegated to Group IV in 2011.
- Saudi Arabia withdrew from the Davis Cup.
