= 2012 Davis Cup Asia/Oceania Zone Group III =

International tennis competition

The Asia/Oceania Zone is one of the three zones of regional Davis Cup competition in 2012.

In the Asia/Oceania Zone there are four different groups in which teams compete against each other to advance to the next group.

== Format ==
The eight teams were split into two pools of four, the top two nations advanced to the promotion pool. The two best teams from there were promoted. The bottom two teams played in a relegation pool, where the two last teams were relegated.

It was played in the week commencing 25 April 2012 at Tehran, Iran and was played on outdoor clay court.

== Group stage ==
=== Group A ===
| Team | Ties Played | Ties Won | Ties Lost | Matches Won | Matches Lost | Standing |
|---|---|---|---|---|---|---|
| Syria | 3 | 3 | 0 | 9 | 0 | 1 |
| Malaysia | 3 | 2 | 1 | 5 | 4 | 2 |
| Oman | 3 | 1 | 2 | 4 | 5 | 3 |
| Bangladesh | 3 | 0 | 3 | 0 | 9 | 4 |

==== Malaysia vs. Oman ====
Malaysia
2
Enghelab Sport Complex, Tehran, Iran
25 April 2012
Clay (outdoor)

Oman
1

| | | | 1 | 2 | 3 |
|---|---|---|---|---|---|
| 1 | (Malaysia) (Oman) | Si Yew Ming; Mohammed Al-Nabhani | 6; 4 | 2; 6 | 6; 3 |
| 2 | (Malaysia) (Oman) | Assri Merzuki; Khalid Al Nabhani | 6; 4 | 6; 4 |
| 3 | (Malaysia) (Oman) | Ariez Elyaas Deen Heshaam / Syed Mohammad Agil Naguib; Mohammed Al-Nabhani / Khalid Al Nabhani | 6; 4 | 6; 7 | 3; 6 |

==== Syria vs. Bangladesh ====
Syria
3
Enghelab Sport Complex, Tehran, Iran
25 April 2012
Clay (outdoor)

Bangladesh
0

| | | | 1 | 2 | 3 |
|---|---|---|---|---|---|
| 1 | (Syria) (Bangladesh) | Issam Al Tawil; Prithul Mondol | 6; 2 | 6; 0 |
| 2 | (Syria) (Bangladesh) | Marc Abdulnour; Sree-Amol Roy | 6; 2 | 6; 1 |
| 3 | (Syria) (Bangladesh) | Marc Abdulnour / Majdi Salim; Prithul Mondol / Ranjan Ram | 6; 3 | 6; 3 |

==== Malaysia vs. Syria ====
Malaysia
0
Enghelab Sport Complex, Tehran, Iran
26 April 2012
Clay (outdoor)

Syria
3

| | | | 1 | 2 | 3 |
|---|---|---|---|---|---|
| 1 | (Malaysia) (Syria) | Si Yew Ming; Issam Al Tawil | 2; 6 | 1; 6 |
| 2 | (Malaysia) (Syria) | Assri Merzuki; Marc Abdulnour | 1; 6 | 0; 6 |
| 3 | (Malaysia) (Syria) | Ariez Elyaas Deen Heshaam / Assri Merzuki; Amer Naow / Majdi Salim | 1; 6 | 4; 6 |

==== Oman vs. Bangladesh ====
Oman
3
Enghelab Sport Complex, Tehran, Iran
26 April 2012
Clay (outdoor)

Bangladesh
0

| | | | 1 | 2 | 3 |
|---|---|---|---|---|---|
| 1 | (Oman) (Bangladesh) | Mohammed Al-Nabhani; Prithul Mondol | 6; 3 | 7; 5 |
| 2 | (Oman) (Bangladesh) | Khalid Al Nabhani; Sree-Amol Roy | 6; 2 | 6; 4 |
| 3 | (Oman) (Bangladesh) | Mohammed Al-Nabhani / Khalid Al Nabhani; Ranjan Ram / Sree-Amol Roy | 6; 1 | 6; 2 |

==== Syria vs. Oman ====
Syria
3
Enghelab Sport Complex, Tehran, Iran
27 April 2012
Clay (outdoor)

Oman
0

| | | | 1 | 2 | 3 |
|---|---|---|---|---|---|
| 1 | (Syria) (Oman) | Majdi Salim; Mohammed Al-Nabhani | 2; 6 | 7^{7} 6^{0} | 6; 2 |
| 2 | (Syria) (Oman) | Issam Al Tawil; Khalid Al Nabhani | 6; 2 | 6; 2 |
| 3 | (Syria) (Oman) | Amer Naow / Majdi Salim; Saleh Al Zadjali / Khalid Al Nabhani | 6; 1 | 6; 4 |

==== Malaysia vs. Bangladesh ====
Malaysia
3
Enghelab Sport Complex, Tehran, Iran
27 April 2012
Clay (outdoor)

Bangladesh
0

| | | | 1 | 2 | 3 |
|---|---|---|---|---|---|
| 1 | (Malaysia) (Bangladesh) | Si Yew Ming; Ranjan Ram | 6; 3 | 6; 1 |
| 2 | (Malaysia) (Bangladesh) | Ariez Elyaas Deen Heshaam; Sree-Amol Roy | 4; 6 | 7; 5 | 6; 4 |
| 3 | (Malaysia) (Bangladesh) | Assri Merzuki / Syed Mohammad Agil Naguib; Sree-Amol Roy / Ranjan Ram | 6; 3 | 6; 2 |

=== Group B ===
| Team | Ties Played | Ties Won | Ties Lost | Matches Won | Matches Lost | Standing |
|---|---|---|---|---|---|---|
| Kuwait | 3 | 3 | 0 | 9 | 0 | 1 |
| Iran | 3 | 2 | 1 | 5 | 4 | 2 |
| Vietnam | 3 | 1 | 2 | 4 | 5 | 3 |
| Kyrgyzstan | 3 | 0 | 3 | 0 | 9 | 4 |

==== Iran vs. Vietnam ====
Iran
2
Enghelab Sport Complex, Tehran, Iran
25 April 2012
Clay (outdoor)

Vietnam
1

| | | | 1 | 2 | 3 |
|---|---|---|---|---|---|
| 1 | (Iran) (Vietnam) | Mohsen Hosseinzadeh; Nam Hoang Ly | 6; 3 | 6; 4 |
| 2 | (Iran) (Vietnam) | Shahin Khaledan; Thiên Nguyễn Hoàng | 6; 1 | 6; 3 |
| 3 | (Iran) (Vietnam) | Shahin Khaledan / Kiarash Souri; Mach Ho / Hoang Anh Khoa Tran | 5; 7 | 3; 6 |

==== Vietnam vs. Kuwait ====
Vietnam
0
Enghelab Sport Complex, Tehran, Iran
26 April 2012
Clay (outdoor)

Kuwait
3

| | | | 1 | 2 | 3 |
|---|---|---|---|---|---|
| 1 | (Vietnam) (Kuwait) | Mach Ho; Mohammad Ghareeb | 0; 6 | 0; 6 |
| 2 | (Vietnam) (Kuwait) | Nam Hoang Ly; Abdullah Maqdes | 1; 6 | 3; 6 |
| 3 | (Vietnam) (Kuwait) | Nam Hoang Ly / Hoang Anh Khoa Tran; Naser Al Obaidly / Mohammad Ghareeb | 2; 6 | 3; 6 |

==== Iran vs. Kyrgyzstan ====
Iran
3
Enghelab Sport Complex, Tehran, Iran
26 April 2012
Clay (outdoor)

Vietnam
0

| | | | 1 | 2 | 3 |
|---|---|---|---|---|---|
| 1 | (Iran) (Vietnam) | Mohsen Hosseinzadeh; Nam Hoang Ly | 6; 0 | 6; 1 |
| 2 | (Iran) (Vietnam) | Shahin Khaledan; Thiên Nguyễn Hoàng | 6; 1 | 6; 0 |
| 3 | (Iran) (Vietnam) | Morteza Moazzam / Kiarash Souri; Mach Ho / Hoang Anh Khoa Tran | 6; 4 | 7^{7} 6^{2} |

==== Iran vs. Kuwait ====
Iran
0
Enghelab Sport Complex, Tehran, Iran
27 April 2012
Clay (outdoor)

Kuwait
3

| | | | 1 | 2 | 3 |
|---|---|---|---|---|---|
| 1 | (Iran) (Kuwait) | Mohsen Hosseinzadeh; Mohammad Ghareeb | 6; 7 | 2; 6 |
| 2 | (Iran) (Kuwait) | Shahin Khaledan; Abdullah Maqdes | 5; 7 | 1; 6 |
| 3 | (Iran) (Kuwait) | Mohsen Hosseinzadeh / Shahin Khaledan; Mohammad Ghareeb / Abdullah Maqdes | 3; 6 | 2; 6 |

==== Vietnam vs. Kyrgyzstan ====
Vietnam
3
Enghelab Sport Complex, Tehran, Iran
27 April 2012
Clay (outdoor)

Kyrgyzstan
0

| | | | 1 | 2 | 3 |
|---|---|---|---|---|---|
| 1 | (Vietnam) (Kyrgyzstan) | Nam Hoang Ly; Askhai Shaikhullin | 6; 2 | 7; 5 |
| 2 | (Vietnam) (Kyrgyzstan) | Thiên Nguyễn Hoàng; Ernest Batirbekov | 6; 3 | 6; 1 |
| 3 | (Vietnam) (Kyrgyzstan) | Mach Ho / Hoang Anh Khoa Tran; Ernest Batirbekov / Askhai Shaikhullin | 6; 2 | 6; 0 |

==== Kuwait vs. Kyrgyzstan ====
Kuwait
3
Enghelab Sport Complex, Tehran, Iran
25 April 2012
Clay (outdoor)

Kyrgyzstan
0

| | | | 1 | 2 | 3 |
|---|---|---|---|---|---|
| 1 | (Kuwait) (Kyrgyzstan) | Mohammad Ghareeb; Askhai Shaikhullin | 6; 1 | 6; 1 |
| 2 | (Kuwait) (Kyrgyzstan) | Abdullah Maqdes; Ernest Batirbekov | 6; 0 | 6; 1 |
| 3 | (Kuwait) (Kyrgyzstan) | Mohammed Abdal / Abdullah Maqdes; Ernest Batirbekov / Askhai Shaikhullin | 6; 2 | 6; 0 |

== Promotion pool ==
Results and points from games against the opponent from the preliminary round were carried forward.

| Team | Ties Played | Ties Won | Ties Lost | Matches Won | Matches Lost | Standing |
|---|---|---|---|---|---|---|
| Syria | 3 | 3 | 0 | 8 | 1 | 1 |
| Kuwait | 3 | 2 | 1 | 5 | 4 | 2 |
| Malaysia | 3 | 1 | 2 | 3 | 6 | 3 |
| Iran | 3 | 0 | 3 | 2 | 7 | 4 |

=== Iran vs. Syria ===
Iran
1
Enghelab Sport Complex, Tehran, Iran
28 April 2012
Clay (outdoor)

Syria
2

| | | | 1 | 2 | 3 |
|---|---|---|---|---|---|
| 1 | (Iran) (Syria) | Mohsen Hosseinzadeh; Issam Al Tawil | 1; 6 | 5; 7 |
| 2 | (Iran) (Syria) | Shahin Khaledan; Marc Abdulnour | 1; 6 | 7^{7} 6^{4} | 2; 6 |
| 3 | (Iran) (Syria) | Morteza Moazzam / Kiarash Souri; Amer Naow / Majdi Salim | 5; 7 | 7; 5 | 6; 2 |

=== Kuwait vs. Malaysia ===
Kuwait
2
Enghelab Sport Complex, Tehran, Iran
28 April 2012
Clay (outdoor)

Malaysia
1

| | | | 1 | 2 | 3 |
|---|---|---|---|---|---|
| 1 | (Kuwait) (Malaysia) | Mohammad Ghareeb; Assri Merzuki | 6; 1 | 6; 3 |
| 2 | (Kuwait) (Malaysia) | Abdullah Maqdes; Ariez Elyaas Deen Heshaam | 6; 1 | 6; 1 |
| 3 | (Kuwait) (Malaysia) | Mohammad Ghareeb / Abdullah Maqdes; Syed Mohammad Agil Naguib / Si Yew Ming | 2; 6 | 1; 6 |

=== Syria vs. Kuwait ===
Syria
3
Enghelab Sport Complex, Tehran, Iran
29 April 2012
Clay (outdoor)

Kuwait
0

| | | | 1 | 2 | 3 |
|---|---|---|---|---|---|
| 1 | (Syria) (Kuwait) | Issam Al Tawil; Naser Al Obaidly | 6; 1 | 7; 5 |
| 2 | (Syria) (Kuwait) | Marc Abdulnour; Mohammed Abdal | 6; 2 | 6; 4 |
| 3 | (Syria) (Kuwait) | Amer Naow / Majdi Salim; Mohammed Abdal / Naser Al Obaidly | 6; 1 | 6; 1 |

=== Iran vs. Malaysia ===
Iran
1
Enghelab Sport Complex, Tehran, Iran
29 April 2012
Clay (outdoor)

Malaysia
2

| | | | 1 | 2 | 3 |
|---|---|---|---|---|---|
| 1 | (Iran) (Malaysia) | Morteza Moazzam; Si Yew Ming | 2; 6 | 3; 6 |
| 2 | (Iran) (Malaysia) | Kiarash Souri; Assri Merzuki | 4; 6 | 2; 6 |
| 3 | (Iran) (Malaysia) | Mohsen Hosseinzadeh / Morteza Moazzam; Ariez Elyaas Deen Heshaam / Syed Mohammad Agil Naguib | 3; 6 | 6; 3 | 6; 4 |

== Relegation pool ==
Results and points from games against the opponent from the preliminary round were carried forward.

| Team | Ties Played | Ties Won | Ties Lost | Matches Won | Matches Lost | Standing |
|---|---|---|---|---|---|---|
| Vietnam | 3 | 3 | 0 | 8 | 1 | 1 |
| Oman | 3 | 2 | 1 | 6 | 3 | 2 |
| Bangladesh | 3 | 1 | 2 | 4 | 5 | 3 |
| Kyrgyzstan | 3 | 0 | 3 | 0 | 9 | 4 |

=== Vietnam vs. Bangladesh ===
Vietnam
2
Enghelab Sport Complex, Tehran, Iran
28 April 2012
Clay (outdoor)

Bangladesh
1

| | | | 1 | 2 | 3 |
|---|---|---|---|---|---|
| 1 | (Vietnam) (Bangladesh) | Nam Hoang Ly; Ranjan Ram | 6; 3 | 6; 0 |
| 2 | (Vietnam) (Bangladesh) | Thiên Nguyễn Hoàng; Sree-Amol Roy | 6; 3 | 6; 0 |
| 3 | (Vietnam) (Bangladesh) | Mach Ho / Hoang Anh Khoa Tran; Ranjan Ram / Sree-Amol Roy | 6^{5} 7^{7} | 6; 3 | 5; 7 |

=== Oman vs. Kyrgyzstan ===
Oman
3
Enghelab Sport Complex, Tehran, Iran
28 April 2012
Clay (outdoor)

Kyrgyzstan
0

| | | | 1 | 2 | 3 |
|---|---|---|---|---|---|
| 1 | (Oman) (Kyrgyzstan) | Mohammed Al-Nabhani; Askhai Shaikhullin | 6; 3 | 6; 2 |
| 2 | (Oman) (Kyrgyzstan) | Khalid Al Nabhani; Ernest Batirbekov | 6; 4 | 6; 2 |
| 3 | (Oman) (Kyrgyzstan) | Khalid Al Nabhani / Mohammed Al-Nabhani; Ernest Batirbekov / Askhai Shaikhullin | 6; 4 | 6; 1 |

=== Vietnam vs. Oman ===
Vietnam
3
Enghelab Sport Complex, Tehran, Iran
29 April 2012
Clay (outdoor)

Oman
0

| | | | 1 | 2 | 3 |
|---|---|---|---|---|---|
| 1 | (Vietnam) (Oman) | Hoang Anh Khoa Tran; Saleh Al Zadjali | 6; 3 | 6; 4 |
| 2 | (Vietnam) (Oman) | Nam Hoang Ly; Khalid Al Nabhani | 3; 6 | 6; 4 | 6; 4 |
| 3 | (Vietnam) (Oman) | Mach Ho / Thiên Nguyễn Hoàng; Khalid Al Nabhani / Mohammed Al-Nabhani | 6; 7 | 6; 2 |

=== Bangladesh vs. Kyrgyzstan ===
Bangladesh
3
Enghelab Sport Complex, Tehran, Iran
29 April 2012
Clay (outdoor)

Kyrgyzstan
0

| | | | 1 | 2 | 3 |
|---|---|---|---|---|---|
| 1 | (Bangladesh) (Kyrgyzstan) | Prithul Mondal; Askhai Shaikhullin | 6; 4 | 6; 3 |
| 2 | (Bangladesh) (Kyrgyzstan) | Sree-Amol Roy; Ernest Batirbekov | 6; 1 | 6; 2 |
| 3 | (Bangladesh) (Kyrgyzstan) | Ranjan Ram / Sree-Amol Roy; Ernest Batirbekov / Askhai Shaikhullin | 6; 1 | 6^{5} 7^{7} | 6; 3 |

== Final standings ==
| Rank | Team |
|---|---|
| 1 | Syria |
| 2 | Kuwait |
| 3 | Malaysia |
| 4 | Iran |
| 5 | Vietnam |
| 6 | Oman |
| 7 | Bangladesh |
| 8 | Kyrgyzstan |

- Syria and Kuwait promoted to Group II in 2013.
- Bangladesh and Kyrgyzstan relegated to Group IV in 2013.
