= Giovani Samaha =

Lebanese tennis player

- Country (sports): Lebanon
- Born: 14 July 1994 (age 31) Beirut, Lebanon
- Height: 1.91 m (6 ft 3 in)
- Plays: Left-handed
- College: Troy University
- Prize money: $19,743

Singles
- Career record: 0–1 (at ATP Tour level, Grand Slam level, and in Davis Cup)
- Career titles: 0; 0 Challenger, 0 Futures
- Highest ranking: No. 819 (19 August 2019)

Doubles
- Career record: 3–3 (at ATP Tour level, Grand Slam level, and in Davis Cup)
- Career titles: 0; 0 Challenger, 3 Futures
- Highest ranking: No. 568 (21 October 2019)

Team competitions
- Davis Cup: 12–8
- Last updated on: 22 March 2021.

Giovani Samaha (born 14 July 1994) is a Lebanese former tennis player.

Samaha has a career high ATP singles ranking of 819 achieved on 19 August 2019 and a career high ATP doubles ranking of 568, achieved on 21 October 2019. Samaha has won three ITF Futures doubles titles.

== Career ==
Samaha represented Lebanon at the Davis Cup, where he has a win–loss record of 12–8.

== Future and Challenger finals ==
=== Singles: 1 (0–1) ===
Legend (singles) ATP Challenger Tour (0–0) ITF Futures Tour (0–1)	Titles by surface Hard (0–0) Clay (0–1) Grass (0–0) Carpet (0–0)

Result	W–L	Date	Tournament	Tier	Surface	Opponent	Score
Loss	0–1	May 2019	M15 Kampala, Uganda	World Tennis Tour	Clay	(Russia) Ivan Nedelko	3–6, 1–1 ret.

=== Doubles 3 (2–1) ===
Legend (doubles) ATP Challenger Tour (0–0) ITF Futures Tour (2–1)	Titles by surface Hard (0–1) Clay (2–0) Grass (0–0) Carpet (0–0)

Result	W–L	Date	Tournament	Tier	Surface	Partner	Opponents	Score
Win	1–0	Jun 2017	Sri Lanka F1, Colombo	Futures	Clay	(United States) Nicholas Bybel	(United Kingdom) Scott Duncan (France) Nicolas Rosenzweig	6–1, 6–2
Win	2–0	May 2018	Uganda F1, Kampala	Futures	Clay	(India) Kunal Anand	(India) Vinayak Sharma Kaza (Serbia) Goran Marković	6–3, 2–6, [10–8]
Loss	2–1	Oct 2018	Egypt F24, Sharm El Sheikh	Futures	Hard	(Egypt) Issam Haitham Taweel	(Russia) Shalva Dzhanashiya (Russia) Alexander Igoshin	6–7^{(3–7)}, 4–6
Win	3–1	Dec 2018	Egypt F31, Cairo	Futures	Clay	(Ukraine) Vladyslav Manafov	(Switzerland) Louroi Martínez (Switzerland) Damien Wenger	6–3, 6–4

== Davis Cup ==
=== Participations: (12–8) ===
Group membership World Group (0–0) Qualifying Round (0–0) WG play-off (0–0) Group I (1–1) Group II (2–3) Group III (9–4) Group IV (0–0)	Matches by surface Hard (10–2) Clay (2–6) Grass (0–0) Carpet (0–0)	Matches by type Singles (8–3) Doubles (4–5)

- ▲ ▼ indicates the outcome of the Davis Cup match followed by the score, date, place of event, the zonal classification and its phase, and the court surface.

Rubber outcome	No.	Rubber	Match type (partner if any)	Opponent nation	Opponent player(s)	Score
▲2–1; 16 June 2011; Sri Lanka Tennis Association, Colombo, Sri Lanka; Asia/Oceania Zone Group III Pool B round robin; hard surface
Defeat	1	III	Doubles (with Bassam Beidas) (dead rubber)	United Arab Emirates	Khaled Al-Hassani / Faisal Bastaki	3–4 ret.
▲3–0; 18 June 2011; Sri Lanka Tennis Association, Colombo, Sri Lanka; Asia/Oceania Zone Group III Promotion Pool round robin; hard surface
Victory	2	III	Doubles (with Patrick Chucri) (dead rubber)	Vietnam	Lê Quốc Khánh / Ngô Quang Huy	4–5 ret.
▼0–3; 19 June 2011; Sri Lanka Tennis Association, Colombo, Sri Lanka; Asia/Oceania Zone Group III Promotion Pool round robin; hard surface
Defeat	3	II	Singles	Sri Lanka	Harshana Godamanna	2–6, 1–6
Defeat	4	III	Doubles (with Patrick Chucri) (dead rubber)	Sri Lanka	Rajeev Rajapakse / Oshada Wijemanne	0–1 ret.
▼2–3; 17–19 July 2015; Sri Lanka Tennis Association, Colombo, Sri Lanka; Asia/Oceania Zone Group II relegation play-off; clay surface
Victory	5	III	Doubles (with Hady Habib)	Sri Lanka	Harshana Godamanna / Dineshkanthan Thangarajah	7–6^{(7–4)}, 2–6, 6–3, 3–6, 6–3
Defeat	6	V	Singles	Sri Lanka	Harshana Godamanna	3–6, 2–6, 3–6
▲3–0; 11 July 2016; Enghelab Sports Complex, Tehran, Iran; Asia/Oceania Zone Group III Pool B round robin; clay surface
Victory	7	II	Singles	Cambodia	Bun Kenny	6–2, 7–6^{(7–3)}
▲3–0; 13 July 2016; Enghelab Sports Complex, Tehran, Iran; Asia/Oceania Zone Group III Pool B round robin; clay surface
Victory	8	II	Singles	Singapore	Roy Hobbs	6–2, 6–4
▲3–0; 14 July 2016; Enghelab Sports Complex, Tehran, Iran; Asia/Oceania Zone Group III Pool B round robin; clay surface
Victory	9	II	Singles	Qatar	Mubarak Shannan Zayid	4–6, 7–6^{(7–5)}, 7–5
▲3–0; 15 July 2016; Enghelab Sports Complex, Tehran, Iran; Asia/Oceania Zone Group III Pool B round robin; clay surface
Victory	10	II	Singles	Syria	Bruno Abdel Nour	6–2, 7–5
▼1–2; 16 July 2016; Enghelab Sports Complex, Tehran, Iran; Asia/Oceania Zone Group III promotional play-off; clay surface
Defeat	11	II	Singles	Hong Kong	Karan Rastogi	3–6, 2–6
▲2–1; 17 July 2017; Sri Lanka Tennis Association, Colombo, Sri Lanka; Asia/Oceania Zone Group III Pool B round robin; clay surface
Victory	12	II	Singles	Turkmenistan	Ýuriý Rogusskiý	7–6^{(7–1)}, 6–2
▲2–1; 19 July 2017; Sri Lanka Tennis Association, Colombo, Sri Lanka; Asia/Oceania Zone Group III Pool B round robin; clay surface
Victory	13	II	Singles	Malaysia	Ahmed Deedat Abdul Razak	6–3, 7–6^{(7–1)}
▲3–0; 20 July 2017; Sri Lanka Tennis Association, Colombo, Sri Lanka; Asia/Oceania Zone Group III Pool B round robin; clay surface
Victory	14	II	Singles	Qatar	Mubarak Shannan Zayid	1–6, 6–4, 6–4
▲3–0; 22 July 2017; Sri Lanka Tennis Association, Colombo, Sri Lanka; Asia/Oceania Zone Group III promotional play-off; clay surface
Victory	15	II	Singles	Jordan	Mousa Alkotop	6–4, 3–6, 6–2
▲3–2; 3–4 February 2018; Taadod Sports Academy, Beirut, Lebanon; Asia/Oceania Zone Group II first round; hard (i) surface
Victory	16	III	Doubles (with Hady Habib)	Chinese Taipei	Chen Ti / Yu Cheng-yu	6–1, 7–5
▲3–1; 7–8 April 2018; Notre Dame University, Zouk Mosbeh, Lebanon; Asia/Oceania Zone Group II second round; hard surface
Defeat	17	III	Doubles (with Hady Habib)	Hong Kong	Wong Chun-hun / Yeung Pak-long	2–6, 4–6
▲3–2; 15–16 September 2018; National Tennis Development Center, Nonthaburi, Thailand; Asia/Oceania Zone Group II promotional play-off; hard surface
Defeat	18	III	Doubles (with Jad Ballout)	Thailand	Sanchai Ratiwatana / Sonchat Ratiwatana	0–6, 3–6
▼2–3; 13-14 September 2019; Automobile and Touring Club of Lebanon, Jounieh, Lebanon; Asia/Oceania Group I first round; clay surface
Defeat	19	III	Doubles (with Benjamin Hassan)	Uzbekistan	Sanjar Fayziev / Jurabek Karimov	2–6, 7–5, 3–6
▲3–1; 6-7 March 2020; Automobile and Touring Club of Lebanon, Jounieh, Lebanon; World Group I Play-off first round; clay surface
Victory	20	III	Doubles (with Benjamin Hassan)	Thailand	Kittirat Kerdlaphee / Phongsapak Kerdlaphee	6–3, 6–7^{(7–9)}, 6–0
