= 2014 Davis Cup Asia/Oceania Zone Group III =

International tennis competition

The Asia/Oceania Zone is one of the three zones of regional Davis Cup competition in 2014.

In the Asia/Oceania Zone there are four different groups in which teams compete against each other to advance to the next group.

== Format ==
The eight teams were split into two pools of four, the top two nations advanced to the promotion pool. The two best teams from there were promoted. The bottom two teams played in a relegation pool, where the two last teams were relegated.

It was played in the week commencing 9 June 2014 at Tehran, Iran and was played on outdoor clay courts.

== Group stage ==
=== Group A ===
Team	Ties Played	Ties Won	Ties Lost	Matches Won	Matches Lost	Standing
Malaysia	3	3	0	6	3	1
Syria	3	2	1	5	4	2
Cambodia	3	1	2	4	5	3
Turkmenistan	3	0	3	3	6	4

==== Malaysia vs. Turkmenistan ====
Malaysia
2
Enghelab Sport Complex, Tehran, Iran
11 June 2014
Clay (outdoor)

Turkmenistan
1

			1	2	3
1	(Malaysia) (Turkmenistan)	Muhammad-Ashaari bin Zainal-Abidin; Georgiy Pochay	6; 1	5; 7	3; 6
2	(Malaysia) (Turkmenistan)	Mohd Assri Merzuki; Aleksandr Ernepesov	6^{5} 7^{7}	6; 4	6; 2
3	(Malaysia) (Turkmenistan)	Mohd Assri Merzuki / Syed Mohammad Agil Naguib; Aleksandr Ernepesov / Georgiy Pochay	7; 5	6; 2

==== Syria vs. Cambodia ====
Syria
2
Enghelab Sport Complex, Tehran, Iran
11 June 2014
Clay (outdoor)

Cambodia
1

			1	2	3
1	(Syria) (Cambodia)	Bruno Abdel Nour; Pannhara Mam	6; 3	6; 2
2	(Syria) (Cambodia)	Marc Abdelnour; Kenny Bun	4; 6	6^{5} 7^{7}
3	(Syria) (Cambodia)	Bruno Abdel Nour / Marc Abdelnour; Kenny Bun / Phalkun Mam	7; 5	6; 2

==== Malaysia vs. Syria ====
Malaysia
2
Enghelab Sport Complex, Tehran, Iran
12 June 2014
Clay (outdoor)

Syria
1

			1	2	3
1	(Malaysia) (Syria)	Syed Mohammad Agil Naguib; Amer Naow	5; 7	6; 2	6; 4
2	(Malaysia) (Syria)	Mohd Assri Merzuki; Bruno Abdel Nour	6; 4	6; 3
3	(Malaysia) (Syria)	Ahmed Deedat Abdul Razak / Muhammad-Ashaari bin Zainal-Abidin; Bruno Abdel Nour / Marc Abdelnour	6; 2	1; 6	6^{7} 7^{9}

==== Cambodia vs. Turkmenistan ====
Cambodia
2
Enghelab Sport Complex, Tehran, Iran
12 June 2014
Clay (outdoor)

Turkmenistan
1

			1	2	3
1	(Cambodia) (Turkmenistan)	Phalkun Mam; Georgiy Pochay	6; 3	6; 4
2	(Cambodia) (Turkmenistan)	Kenny Bun; Aleksandr Ernepesov	6; 2	6; 4
3	(Cambodia) (Turkmenistan)	Pannhara Mam / Phalkun Mam; Aleksandr Ernepesov / Georgiy Pochay	7	4; 6^{2}	4; 6

==== Malaysia vs. Cambodia ====
Malaysia
2
Enghelab Sport Complex, Tehran, Iran
13 June 2014
Clay (outdoor)

Cambodia
1

			1	2	3
1	(Malaysia) (Cambodia)	Syed Mohammad Agil Naguib; Pannhara Mam	6; 2	6; 0
2	(Malaysia) (Cambodia)	Mohd Assri Merzuki; Kenny Bun	3; 6	1; 6
3	(Malaysia) (Cambodia)	Mohd Assri Merzuki / Syed Mohammad Agil Naguib; Kenny Bun / Phalkun Mam	6^{5} 7^{7}	6; 4	7^{9} 6^{7}

==== Syria vs. Turkmenistan ====
Syria
2
Enghelab Sport Complex, Tehran, Iran
13 June 2014
Clay (outdoor)

Turkmenistan
1

			1	2	3
1	(Syria) (Turkmenistan)	Bruno Abdel Nour; Georgiy Pochay	6; 2	7^{8} 6^{6}
2	(Syria) (Turkmenistan)	Marc Abdelnour; Aleksandr Ernepesov	2; 6	6; 3	5; 7
3	(Syria) (Turkmenistan)	Bruno Abdel Nour / Marc Abdelnour; Eziz Dovletov / Georgiy Pochay	6; 3	6; 3

=== Group B ===
Team	Ties Played	Ties Won	Ties Lost	Matches Won	Matches Lost	Standing
Iran	3	3	0	6	3	1
Lebanon	3	2	1	5	4	2
United Arab Emirates	3	1	2	4	5	3
Singapore	3	0	3	3	6	4

==== Lebanon vs. Singapore ====
Lebanon
3
Enghelab Sport Complex, Tehran, Iran
11 June 2014
Clay (outdoor)

Singapore
0

			1	2	3
1	(Lebanon) (Singapore)	Karim Alayli; Roy Hobbs	6; 3	6; 1
2	(Lebanon) (Singapore)	Bassam Beidas; Yong Jie Isaac Ong	6; 3	6; 2
3	(Lebanon) (Singapore)	Patrick Chucri / Kamil Khalil; Roy Hobbs / Joshua Liu	6; 3	6; 4

==== Iran vs. United Arab Emirates ====
Iran
3
Enghelab Sport Complex, Tehran, Iran
11 June 2014
Clay (outdoor)

United Arab Emirates
0

			1	2	3
1	(Iran) (United Arab Emirates)	Shahin Khaledan; Hamad Abbas Janahi	6; 1	6; 0
2	(Iran) (United Arab Emirates)	Anoosha Shahgholi; Omar Al-Awadhi	6; 1	6; 0
3	(Iran) (United Arab Emirates)	Hamid Reza Nadaf / Omid Souri; Mahmoud Nader Al Blooshi / Abdulrahman Al Janahi	6; 2	6; 1

==== Lebanon vs. Iran ====
Lebanon
0
Enghelab Sport Complex, Tehran, Iran
12 June 2014
Clay (outdoor)

Iran
3

			1	2	3
1	(Lebanon) (Iran)	Bassam Beidas; Shahin Khaledan	6; 3	3; 6	4; 6
2	(Lebanon) (Iran)	Patrick Chucri; Anoosha Shahgholi	3; 6	6^{4} 7^{7}
3	(Lebanon) (Iran)	Patrick Chucri / Kamil Khalil; Hamid Reza Nadaf / Omid Souri	7^{9} 6^{7}	5; 7		retired

==== United Arab Emirates vs. Singapore ====
United Arab Emirates
2
Enghelab Sport Complex, Tehran, Iran
12 June 2014
Clay (outdoor)

Singapore
1

			1	2	3
1	(United Arab Emirates) (Singapore)	Hamad Abbas Janahi; Roy Hobbs	6; 3	6; 4
2	(United Arab Emirates) (Singapore)	Omar Al-Awadhi; Yong Jie Isaac Ong	3; 6	4; 6
3	(United Arab Emirates) (Singapore)	Omar Al-Awadhi / Hamad Abbas Janahi; Roy Hobbs / Yong Jie Isaac Ong	2; 6	6; 2	6; 4

==== Lebanon vs. United Arab Emirates ====
Lebanon
2
Enghelab Sport Complex, Tehran, Iran
13 June 2014
Clay (outdoor)

United Arab Emirates
1

			1	2	3
1	(Lebanon) (United Arab Emirates)	Kamil Khalil; Hamad Abbas Janahi	6; 3	6; 2
2	(Lebanon) (United Arab Emirates)	Bassam Beidas; Mahmoud Nader Al Blooshi	7; 5	6; 4
3	(Lebanon) (United Arab Emirates)	Bassam Beidas / Patrick Chucri; Mahmoud Nader Al Blooshi / Hamad Abbas Janahi				retired

==== Iran vs. Singapore ====
Iran
3
Enghelab Sport Complex, Tehran, Iran
13 June 2014
Clay (outdoor)

Singapore
0

			1	2	3
1	(Iran) (Singapore)	Shahin Khaledan; Joshua Liu	6; 1	6; 0
2	(Iran) (Singapore)	Hamid Reza Nadaf; Yong Jie Isaac Ong	6; 2	6; 3
3	(Iran) (Singapore)	Anoosha Shahgholi / Omid Souri; Shaheed Alam / Joshua Liu	6; 1	6; 1

== Promotion play-off ==
=== Malaysia vs. Lebanon ===
Malaysia
0
Enghelab Sport Complex, Tehran, Iran
14 June 2014
Clay (outdoor)

Lebanon
2

			1	2	3
1	(Malaysia) (Lebanon)	Syed Mohammad Agil Naguib; Bassam Beidas	2; 6	0; 6
2	(Malaysia) (Lebanon)	Mohd Assri Merzuki; Patrick Chucri	4; 6	0; 6
3	(Malaysia) (Lebanon)	Mohd Assri Merzuki / Syed Mohammad Agil Naguib; Bassam Beidas / Patrick Chucri				not played

=== Iran vs. Syria ===
Iran
3
Enghelab Sport Complex, Tehran, Iran
14 June 2014
Clay (outdoor)

Syria
0

			1	2	3
1	(Iran) (Syria)	Shahin Khaledan; Bruno Abdel Nour	6; 2	6; 0
2	(Iran) (Syria)	Anoosha Shahgholi; Marc Abdelnour	6; 2	6; 1
3	(Iran) (Syria)	Hamid Reza Nadaf / Omid Souri; Bruno Abdel Nour / Amer Naow	6; 2	6; 4

== Relegation play-off ==
=== Cambodia vs. Singapore ===
Cambodia
2
Enghelab Sport Complex, Tehran, Iran
14 June 2014
Clay (outdoor)

Singapore
1

			1	2	3
1	(Cambodia) (Singapore)	Phalkun Mam; Joshua Liu	6; 4	6; 3
2	(Cambodia) (Singapore)	Kenny Bun; Roy Hobbs	6; 0	6; 0
3	(Cambodia) (Singapore)	Samneang Long / Pannhara Mam; Shaheed Alam / Yong Jie Isaac Ong	6^{5} 7^{7}	3; 6

=== Turkmenistan vs. United Arab Emirates ===
Turkmenistan
2
Enghelab Sport Complex, Tehran, Iran
14 June 2014
Clay (outdoor)

United Arab Emirates
1

			1	2	3
1	(Turkmenistan) (United Arab Emirates)	Georgiy Pochay; Hamad Abbas Janahi	6; 2	4; 6	2; 6
2	(Turkmenistan) (United Arab Emirates)	Aleksandr Ernepesov; Omar Al-Awadhi	1; 6	6; 1	6; 0
3	(Turkmenistan) (United Arab Emirates)	Aleksandr Ernepesov / Georgiy Pochay; Omar Al-Awadhi / Hamad Abbas Janahi	7^{11} 6^{9}	6; 4

== Final standings ==
Rank	Team
1	Iran
2	Lebanon
3	Malaysia
4	Syria
5	Cambodia
6	Turkmenistan
7	United Arab Emirates
8	Singapore

- Iran and Lebanon promoted to Group II in 2015.
- United Arab Emirates and Singapore relegated to Group IV in 2015.
