= Philippines Davis Cup team =

National sports team

Philippines
- Captain: Joseph Lizardo
- Nations Ranking: 53 ▼1
- Colors: Blue and white
- First year: 1926
- Years played: 60+
- Ties played (W–L): 136 (72–64)
- Best finish: Inter-Zonal (1957, 1958, 1960, and 1964); World Group play-offs (1991)
- Most total wins: Felicisimo Ampon (40–35)
- Most singles wins: Felicisimo Ampon (34–26)
- Most doubles wins: Johnny Arcilla (10–7)
- Best doubles team: Treat Huey/Cecil Mamiit (5–3); Raymundo Deyro/Johnny Jose (5–3)
- Most ties played: Raymundo Deyro (37)
- Most years played: Raymundo Deyro (17)

The Philippines men's national tennis team represents the Philippines in Davis Cup tennis competition and are governed by the Philippine Tennis Association.

The Philippines currently compete in the Asia/Oceania Zone of Group IV. They won the Eastern Zone in 1957, 1958, 1960, and 1964, and reached the World Group Play-off in 1991.

In April 2007, businessman and sportsman Jean Henri Lhuillier, president and chief executive officer of Cebuana Lhuillier was appointed team manager of the Philippines' Davis Cup team.

== History ==
The Philippines was set to compete at the Davis Cup in 1921 but withdrew from the tournament. The country was supposed to be represented by brothers, Francisco and Guillermo Aragon in that year. The Philippines later decided not to enter the 1923 edition after withdrawing from both 1921 and 1922 editions. The country later competed in its first Davis Cup in 1926 becoming the first Southeast Asian country to do so. American Dwight Davis, who was also Governor General of US-administered Philippines promoted the sports in throughout the archipelago during his tenure.

The country was banned in the Davis Cup for two years by the International Tennis Federation due to "long-standing governance failings" within the Philippine Tennis Association.

This meant that the Philippines did not participate in the Davis Cup starting from the 2021 season. Philta's suspension was lifted in January 2024 after a new set of officers were elected in an ITF-ordered vote in December 2023.

The Philippines returned in the Davis Cup starting at the bottom Asia/Oceania Group V division. They earned a promotion in their return.

== Current team (2024) ==
- Alberto Lim Jr.
- Eric Olivarez Jr.
- Francis Alcantara
- Ruben Gonzales
- Patrick-John Tierro

== Results ==
Zone legend
World Group/Inter-Zonal/Challenge Round
World Group play-offs/Qualifying Play-offs
Continental Zone I
Continental Zone II
Continental Zone III
Continental Zone IV/V

Year	Zone	Final round	Final opponent	Score	Result
1921	World	1st	Japan	W/O	Withdrew
1922	World	1st	Spain	W/O	Withdrew
1923–1925	Did not enter				
1926	America	Semifinal	Japan	0–5	Lost
1927	Did not enter				
1928	North & Central America	Semifinal	Australia	0–5	Lost
1929	America	Quarterfinal	United States	0–5	Lost
1930–1945	Did not enter				
1946	America	Quarterfinal	United States	0–5	Lost
1947–1949	Did not enter				
1950	Europe	Quarterfinal	Sweden	0–5	Lost
1951	Europe	Semifinal	Sweden	0–5	Lost
1952	Did not enter				
1953	Europe	Quarterfinal	Denmark	1–4	Lost
1954	Did not enter				
1955	Eastern	Final	Japan	2–3	Stays at Eastern Zone
1956	Did not enter				
1957	Inter-Zonal	Final	United States	0–5	Stays at Eastern Zone
1958	Inter-Zonal	Semifinal	Italy	0–5	Stays at Eastern Zone
1959	Eastern	Final	India	1–4	Stays at Eastern Zone
1960	Inter-Zonal	Semifinal	United States	0–5	Stays at Eastern Zone
1961	Eastern	Semifinal	Japan	2–3	Stays at Eastern Zone
1962	Eastern	Final	India	0–5	Stays at Eastern Zone
1963	Eastern	Semifinal	Japan	0–5	Stays at Eastern Zone
1964	Inter-Zonal	Semifinal	Sweden	0–5	Stays at Eastern Zone
1965	Eastern	Semifinal	Japan	0–5	Stays at Eastern Zone
1966	Eastern	Final	Japan	2–3	Stays at Eastern Zone
1967	Eastern	Final	Japan	0–5	Stays at Eastern Zone
1968	Eastern	Final	Japan	1–4	Stays at Eastern Zone
1969	Eastern	Semifinal	Japan	0–5	Stays at Eastern Zone
1970	Eastern	Semifinal	Australia	0–5	Stays at Eastern Zone
1971	Eastern	Final	Japan	1–4	Stays at Eastern Zone
1972	Eastern	Quarterfinal	South Korea	W/O	Stays at Eastern Zone
1973	Did not enter				
1974	Eastern	Quarterfinal	Japan	0–5	Stays at Eastern Zone
1975	Eastern	Quarterfinal	India	0–4	Stays at Eastern Zone
1976	Eastern	Preliminary round	Thailand	W/O	Stays at Eastern Zone
1977	Eastern	Semifinal	Japan	1–4	Stays at Eastern Zone
1978	Eastern	Preliminary round	Pakistan	W/O	Stays at Eastern Zone
1979	Eastern	Preliminary round	Thailand	W/O	Stays at Eastern Zone
1980–1981	Did not enter				
1982	Eastern	Quarterfinal	South Korea	1–4	Stays at Eastern Zone
1983	Eastern	Quarterfinal	South Korea	1–4	Stays at Eastern Zone
1984	Eastern	Quarterfinal	Japan	0–5	Stays at Eastern Zone
1985	Eastern	Semifinal	South Korea	1–4	Stays at Eastern Zone
1986	Eastern	1st round	Indonesia	1–4	Stays at Eastern Zone
1987	Eastern	Quarterfinal	China	1–4	Included at newly created Eastern Zone Group I
1988	Eastern Group I	Quarterfinal	Japan	0–5	Stays at renamed Asia/Oceania Zone Zone Group I
1989	Asia/Oceania Group I	Quarterfinal	New Zealand	1–4	Stays at Asia/Oceania Zone Group I
1990	Asia/Oceania Group I	Quarterfinal	China	0–5	Stays at Asia/Oceania Zone Group I
1991	World Group qualifying round	Final	Sweden	0–5	Stays at Asia/Oceania Zone Group I
1992	Asia/Oceania Group I	Quarterfinal	Indonesia	1–4	Stays at Asia/Oceania Zone Group I
1993	Asia/Oceania Group I	Quarterfinal	Indonesia	1–4	Stays at Asia/Oceania Zone Group I
1994	Asia/Oceania Group I	Quarterfinal	Japan	0–5	Stays at Asia/Oceania Zone Group I
1995	Asia/Oceania Group I	Semifinal	India	0–5	Stays at Asia/Oceania Zone Group I
1996	Asia/Oceania Group I	Relegation play-off	Chinese Taipei	3–2	Stays at Asia/Oceania Zone Group I
1997	Asia/Oceania Group I	Relegation play-off	Uzbekistan	0–5	Relegated to Asia/Oceania Zone Group II
1998	Asia/Oceania Group II	Relegation play-off	Hong Kong	4–1	Stays at Asia/Oceania Zone Group II
1999	Asia/Oceania Group II	Final	Thailand	4–1	Stays at Asia/Oceania Zone Group II
2000	Asia/Oceania Group II	Relegation play-off	Iran	2–3	Relegated to Asia/Oceania Zone Group III
2001	Asia/Oceania Group III	Final	Kazakhstan	2–0	Promoted to Asia/Oceania Zone Group II
2002	Asia/Oceania Group II	Relegation play-off	Kuwait	3–2	Stays at Asia/Oceania Zone Group II
2003	Asia/Oceania Group II	Relegation play-off	Kazakhstan	3–2	Stays at Asia/Oceania Zone Group II
2004	Asia/Oceania Group II	Relegation play-off	Hong Kong	4–1	Stays at Asia/Oceania Zone Group II
2005	Asia/Oceania Group II	Relegation play-off	Lebanon	3–2	Relegated to Asia/Oceania Zone Group III
2006	Asia/Oceania Group III	Round robin	Sri Lanka	NP	Promoted to Asia/Oceania Zone Group II
2007	Asia/Oceania Group II	Final	Kuwait	5–0	Promoted to Asia/Oceania Zone Group I
2008	Asia/Oceania Group I	Relegation play-off	Kazakhstan	0–5	Relegated to Asia/Oceania Zone Group II
2009	Asia/Oceania Group II	Final	New Zealand	4–1	Promoted to Asia/Oceania Zone Group I
2010	Asia/Oceania Group I	Relegation play-off	South Korea	3–2	Stays at Asia/Oceania Zone Group I
2011	Asia/Oceania Group I	Relegation play-off	Chinese Taipei	2–3	Relegated to Asia/Oceania Zone Group II
2012	Asia/Oceania Group II	Final	Indonesia	2–3	Stays at Asia/Oceania Zone Group II
2013	Asia/Oceania Group II	Final	New Zealand	2–3	Stays at Asia/Oceania Zone Group II
2014	Asia/Oceania Group II	Semifinal	Pakistan	2–3	Stays at Asia/Oceania Zone Group II
2015	Asia/Oceania Group II	Semifinal	Chinese Taipei	1–3	Stays at Asia/Oceania Zone Group II
2016	Asia/Oceania Group II	Semifinal	Chinese Taipei	1–3	Stays at Asia/Oceania Zone Group II
2017	Asia/Oceania Group II	1st Round	Thailand	0–5	Stays at Asia/Oceania Zone Group II
2018	Asia/Oceania Group II	Semifinal	Thailand	1–4	Stays at Asia/Oceania Zone Group II
2019	Asia/Oceania Group II	Final	Thailand	1–3	World Group II play-offs
2020–21	World Group II play-offs	Final	Greece	1–4	Relegates to 2021 Asia/Oceania Zone Group III but withdrew due to a ban.
2022–2023	Suspended				
2024	Asia/Oceania Group V	Promotion play-off	Northern Mariana Islands	2–1	Promoted to Asia/Oceania Zone Group IV
2024	Asia/Oceania Group IV	Promotion play-off	Kyrgyzstan	2-0	Promoted to Asia/Oceania Zone Group III

== Head to head ==
Last updated: Philippines - Indonesia; February 5, 2017

Davis Cup Team Record

(by No. of ties)

- vs Japan 27 ties 9–18
- vs Indonesia 11 ties 5–6
- vs Sri Lanka 9 ties 9–0
- vs South Korea 9 ties 4–5
- vs Chinese Taipei 8 ties 4–4
- vs Pakistan 7 ties 5–2
- vs India 7 ties 3–4
- vs Hong Kong 6 ties 6–0
- vs New Zealand 6 ties 3–3
- vs Thailand 6 ties 4–2
- vs China 6 ties 2–4
- vs Kazakhstan 4 ties 1–3
- vs Sweden 4 ties 0–4
- vs Malaysia 3 ties 3–0
- vs Singapore 3 ties 3–0
- vs United States 3 ties 0–3
- vs Kuwait 3 ties 3–0
- vs Vietnam 2 ties 2–0
- vs Iran 2 ties 1–1
- vs Australia 2 ties 0–2
- vs Uzbekistan 2 ties 0–2
- vs Bahrain 1 tie 1–0
- vs Brazil 1 tie 1–0
- vs Finland 1 tie 1–0
- vs Myanmar 1 tie 1–0
- vs Netherlands 1 tie 1–0
- vs Saudi Arabia 1 tie 1–0
- vs Syria 1 tie 1–0
- vs Tajikistan 1 tie 1–0
- vs Pacific Oceania 1 tie 1–0
- vs Austria 1 tie 0–1
- vs Italy 1 tie 0–1
- vs Lebanon 1 tie 0–1

Notes:Not games resulting to walkovers.

- Philippines forfeited 1 game each against Japan (1921), Spain (1922), South Korea (1972) and Pakistan (1978);2 games against Thailand (1976, 1979)
- Peru forfeited 1 game against the Philippines (1950).

== See also ==
- Davis Cup
- Philippines Billie Jean King Cup team
