= 2011 Davis Cup Asia/Oceania Zone Group II =

International tennis competition

The Asia/Oceania Zone is one of the three zones of regional Davis Cup competition in 2011.

In the Asia/Oceania Zone there are four different groups in which teams compete against each other to advance to the next group.

== Participating teams ==
=== Seeds ===
1. South Korea
2. Thailand
3. Indonesia
4. Pakistan

=== Remaining Nations ===
- Hong Kong
- Iran
- Pacific Oceania
- Syria

== Draw ==
Play-offs
Victoria Park, Hong Kong (hard)
Syria	1
Hong Kong	4
Guam (hard)
Iran	1
Pacific Oceania	4

First Round
Changwon, South Korea (hard)
1	South Korea	4
Syria	1
Causeway Bay, Hong Kong (hard)
4	Pakistan	3
Hong Kong	2
Tehran, Iran (indoor clay)
Iran	2
3	Indonesia	3
Guam (hard)
Pacific Oceania	0
2	Thailand	5

Second Round
Gimcheon, South Korea (hard)
1	South Korea	4
4	Pakistan	0
Nonthaburi, Thailand (hard)
3	Indonesia	1
2	Thailand	4

Third Round
Gimcheon, South Korea (hard)
1	South Korea	3
2	Thailand	0

- Syria and Iran relegated to Group III in 2012.
- South Korea promoted to Group I in 2012.

== First round ==
=== South Korea vs. Syria ===
South Korea
4
Changwon Municipal Tennis Courts, Changwon, South Korea
4–6 March 2011
hard

Syria
1

			1	2	3	4	5
1	(South Korea) (Syria)	Kim Hyun-joon; Marc Abdulnour	6; 3	6; 1	6; 1
2	(South Korea) (Syria)	Cho Soong-jae; Issam Tawil	6; 1	6; 4	6; 1
3	(South Korea) (Syria)	Cho Soong-jae / Kim Hyun-joon; Romain Radwan / Majdi Salim	6; 2	6; 1	6; 1
4	(South Korea) (Syria)	Jeong Suk-young; Marc Abdulnour	6; 3	4; 6	6^{3} 7^{7}
5	(South Korea) (Syria)	Lim Yong-kyu; Issam Tawil	6; 2	6; 2

=== Hong Kong vs. Pakistan ===
Hong Kong
2
Victoria Park, Causeway Bay, Hong Kong
4–6 March 2011
hard

Pakistan
3

			1	2	3	4	5
1	(Hong Kong) (Pakistan)	Yu Hiu Tung; Aisam-ul-Haq Qureshi	7^{7} 6^{3}	4; 6	6^{2} 7^{7}	7; 5	6; 4
2	(Hong Kong) (Pakistan)	Martin Sayer; Aqeel Khan	5; 7	5; 7	4; 6
3	(Hong Kong) (Pakistan)	Jonathan Chu / Coenie van Wyk; Aqeel Khan / Aisam-ul-Haq Qureshi	6^{4} 7^{7}	4; 6	4; 6
4	(Hong Kong) (Pakistan)	Martin Sayer; Aisam-ul-Haq Qureshi	6^{8} 7^{10}	3; 6	6^{4} 7^{7}
5	(Hong Kong) (Pakistan)	Jonathan Chu; Samir Iftikhar	6; 1	6; 4

=== Iran vs. Indonesia ===
Iran
2
Shiroudi Sports Complex, Tehran, Iran
4–6 March 2011
clay (indoors)

Indonesia
3

			1	2	3	4	5
1	(Iran) (Indonesia)	Anousha Shahgholi; Sunu Wahyu Trijati	6; 3	6; 4	2; 6	4; 6	7; 5
2	(Iran) (Indonesia)	Shahin Khaledan; Christopher Rungkat	6^{3} 7^{7}	1; 6	3; 6
3	(Iran) (Indonesia)	Omid Souri / Anousha Shahgholi; Christopher Rungkat / Sunu Wahyu Trijati	3; 6	1; 6	5; 7
4	(Iran) (Indonesia)	Mohsen Hosseinzadeh; Christopher Rungkat	3; 6	3; 6	0; 6
5	(Iran) (Indonesia)	Shahin Khaledan; Aditya Hari Sasongko	6; 1	6^{5} 7^{7}	6; 3

=== Pacific Oceania vs. Thailand ===
Pacific Oceania
0
Hilton Tennis Club, Guam
4–6 March 2011
hard

Thailand
5

			1	2	3	4	5
1	(Pacific Oceania) (Thailand)	Cyril Jacobe; Danai Udomchoke	0; 6	2; 6	3; 6
2	(Pacific Oceania) (Thailand)	Michael Leong; Kittipong Wachiramanowong	3; 6	3; 6	0; 6
3	(Pacific Oceania) (Thailand)	Cyril Jacobe / Leon So'onalole; Sanchai Ratiwatana / Sonchat Ratiwatana	4; 6	5; 7	2; 6
4	(Pacific Oceania) (Thailand)	Michael Leong; Danai Udomchoke	4; 6	0; 6
5	(Pacific Oceania) (Thailand)	Cyril Jacobe; Kittipong Wachiramanowong	2; 6	2; 6

== Playoff round ==
=== Hong Kong vs. Syria ===
Hong Kong
4
Victoria Park, Hong Kong
8–10 July 2011
hard (outdoor)

Syria
1

			1	2	3	4	5
1	(Hong Kong) (Syria)	Nicolas Sayer; Issam Al Taweel	6; 4	3; 6	5; 7	6; 1	6; 3
2	(Hong Kong) (Syria)	Yu Hiu Tung; Marc Abdelnour	6; 2	6; 4	6; 3
3	(Hong Kong) (Syria)	Jonathan Chu / Coenie van Wyk; Marc Abdelnour / Issam Al Taweel	6; 4	1; 6	6; 3	6; 1
4	(Hong Kong) (Syria)	Nicolas Sayer; Bruno Abdelnour	2; 6	0; 6
5	(Hong Kong) (Syria)	Coenie van Wyk; Romain Radwan	6; 1	6; 4

=== Pacific Oceania vs. Iran ===
Pacific Oceania
4
Hilton Tennis Club, Guam
8–10 July 2011
hard (outdoor)

Iran
1

			1	2	3	4	5
1	(Pacific Oceania) (Iran)	West Nott; Shahin Khaledan	6; 1	6; 4	6; 2
2	(Pacific Oceania) (Iran)	Michael Leong; Rouzbeh Kamran	1; 6	6; 3	6; 4	6; 4
3	(Pacific Oceania) (Iran)	Cyril Jacobe / Daniel Llarenas; Ashkan Shokoofi / Akbar Taheri	3; 6	6; 3	6; 4	6; 2
4	(Pacific Oceania) (Iran)	Cyril Jacobe; Shahin Khaledan	4; 6	4; 6
5	(Pacific Oceania) (Iran)	West Nott; Rouzbeh Kamran	6; 3	6; 4

== Second round ==
=== South Korea vs. Pakistan ===
South Korea
4
Gimcheon Total Sports Town Tennis Courts, Gimcheon, South Korea
8–10 July 2011
hard (outdoor)

Pakistan
0

			1	2	3	4	5
1	(South Korea) (Pakistan)	Im Kyu-tae; Aqeel Khan	6; 2	6; 4	6; 2
2	(South Korea) (Pakistan)	Lim Yong-kyu; Aisam-ul-Haq Qureshi	6; 2	5; 7	6; 4	3; 6	6; 3
3	(South Korea) (Pakistan)	Lim Yong-kyu / Seol Jae-min; Aqeel Khan / Aisam-ul-Haq Qureshi	6; 4	6; 2	6^{7} 7^{9}	4; 6	13; 11
4	(South Korea) (Pakistan)	Kim Young-jun; Yasir Khan	6; 0	6; 0
5	(South Korea) (Pakistan)	Lim Yong-kyu; Aqeel Khan						not played

=== Thailand vs. Indonesia ===
Thailand
4
National Tennis Development Center, Nonthaburi, Thailand
8–10 July 2011
hard (outdoor)

Indonesia
1

			1	2	3	4	5
1	(Thailand) (Indonesia)	Kittipong Wachiramanowong; Christopher Rungkat	2; 6	6^{3} 7^{7}	0; 6
2	(Thailand) (Indonesia)	Danai Udomchoke; Elbert Sie	6; 1	6; 1	6; 0
3	(Thailand) (Indonesia)	Sanchai Ratiwatana / Sonchat Ratiwatana; Aditya Hari Sasongko / David Agung Susanto	6; 2	6; 2	6; 2
4	(Thailand) (Indonesia)	Danai Udomchoke; Christopher Rungkat	6; 4	6; 2	6; 1
5	(Thailand) (Indonesia)	Kittipong Wachiramanowong; Elbert Sie	6^{4} 7^{7}	7; 5				retired

== Third round ==
=== South Korea vs. Thailand ===
South Korea
3
Gimcheon Total Sports Town Tennis Courts, Gimcheon, South Korea
16–18 September 2011
hard (outdoor)

Thailand
0

			1	2	3	4	5
1	(South Korea) (Thailand)	Lim Yong-kyu; Perakiat Siriluethaiwattana	6; 3	6; 3	6; 2
2	(South Korea) (Thailand)	Kim Young-jun; Kittipong Wachiramanowong	6; 2	6; 3	7; 5
3	(South Korea) (Thailand)	Lim Yong-kyu / Seol Jae-min; Sanchai Ratiwatana / Sonchat Ratiwatana	2; 1					retired
4	(South Korea) (Thailand)	Chung Hong; Kittipong Wachiramanowong						not played
5	(South Korea) (Thailand)	Seol Jae-min; Perakiat Siriluethaiwattana						not played
