= Iran Davis Cup team =

National sports team

Iran
- Captain: Seyedakbar Taherirehaghi
- ITF ranking: 64
- First year: 1962
- Years played: 43
- Ties played (W–L): 108 (57 - 51)
- Years in World Group: 0 (0 - 0)
- Most total wins: Anoosha Shahgholi (38-27)
- Most singles wins: Anoosha Shahgholi (27-16)
- Most doubles wins: Kanyab Derafshijavan (12-8); Ashkan Shokoofi (12-16)
- Best doubles team: Team: Kanyab Derafshijavan and Mostafa Saleh (6-0); Anoosha Shahgholi and Ashkan Shokoofi (6-6)
- Most ties played: Anoosha Shahgholi (43)
- Most years played: Anoosha Shahgholi (16)

The Iran Davis Cup team represents Iran in Davis Cup tennis competition and are governed by the Tennis Federation of Iran.

Iran currently competes in the Asia/Oceania Zone of Group III.

== History ==
Iran competed in its first Davis Cup in 1962.

== Current team (2022) ==
- Amir Hossein Badi
- Hesam Esmail Yazdi
- Ali Yazdani
- Samyar Elyasi (Junior player)
- Kasra Rahmani (Junior player)

== Notable players ==
- Mansour Bahrami
- Taghi Akbari
- Mohammad Hossein Akbari
- Ali Madani
- Anoosha Shahgholi

== Tournaments ==
Year	Zone	Notes
1959	Eastern Zone	1st round, Forfeit
1962	Eastern Zone	Semi-finals
1963	American Zone	1st round
1964	Eastern Zone B	Semi-finals
1965	Eastern Zone B	1st round
1966	Eastern Zone A	Semi-finals
1967	Eastern Zone B	Final
1968	European Zone B	Quarter-finals
1969	European Zone B	1st round
1970	European Zone B	1st round
1972	European Zone	Quarter-finals
1973	European Zone A	Preliminary Rounds 4
1974	European Zone A	Preliminary Rounds 4
1975	European Zone B	Preliminary Rounds 5
1976	European Zone A	Preliminary Rounds 3
1977	European Zone B	Preliminary Rounds 4
1978	European Zone B	Preliminary Rounds 4
1979	European Zone B	Preliminary Rounds 5
1985	European Zone A	1st round, Forfeit
1986	European Zone B	1st round, Forfeit
1992	Asia/Oceania Zone Group III	Round-Robin winner, Promoted
1993	Asia/Oceania Zone Group II	Round-Robin
1994	Asia/Oceania Zone Group II	Round-Robin
1995	Asia/Oceania Zone Group II	Round-Robin
1996	Asia/Oceania Zone Group II	Round-Robin
1997	Asia/Oceania Zone Group II	Round-Robin
1998	Asia/Oceania Zone Group II	Round-Robin
1999	Asia/Oceania Zone Group II	Round-Robin
2000	Asia/Oceania Zone Group II	Round-Robin
2001	Asia/Oceania Zone Group II	Round-Robin, Relegated
2002	Asia/Oceania Zone Group II	Round-Robin, Promoted
2003	Asia/Oceania Zone Group II	Round-Robin
2004	Asia/Oceania Zone Group II	1st round
2005	Asia/Oceania Zone Group II	1st round, Relegated
2006	Asia/Oceania Zone Group III	1st-4th Playoff, Promoted
2007	Asia/Oceania Zone Group II	1st round, Relegated
2008	Asia/Oceania Zone Group III	1st-4th Playoff
2009	Asia/Oceania Zone III	
2010	Asia/Oceania Zone Group III	Promotional Pool, Promoted
2011	Asia/Oceania Zone Group II	1st round, Relegated
2012	Asia/Oceania Zone Group III	1st-4th Playoff
2013	Asia/Oceania Zone Group III	1st round
2014	Asia/Oceania Zone Group III	Promoted
2015	Asia/Oceania Zone Group II	1st round, Relegated
2016	Asia/Oceania Zone Group III	Promoted
2017	Asia/Oceania Zone Group II	1st round

== Statistics ==
Since 1959(Last updated 29 August 2017) Thailand w/o Iran in 1959. Iran w/o Burma in 1964. Iran w/o Malaysia in 1967. Iran w/o Nigeria in 1975. Turkey w/o Iran in 1985. Hungary w/o Iran in 1986.

Record

- Champion: none
- Runner-up: none
- Lost in Semifinals: none
- Lost in Quarterfinals: none
- Lost in first round: n times

Home and away record (all NN match-ups)

- Performance at home (NN match-ups): NN–NN (NN.N%)
- Performance away (NN match-ups): NN–NN (NN.N%)
- Total: NN–NN (NN.N%)

Head-to-head record (1959–)

Africa

- Algeria 2-0
- Egypt 1-0
- South Africa 0-2
- Nigeria Iran w/o

Asia and Oceania

- Bangladesh 1-0
- Brunei 2-0
- China 0-1
- Hong Kong 1-3
- Indonesia 0-2
- India 0-4
- Jordan 1-0
- Kazakhstan 0-1
- Kyrgyzstan 1-0
- Saudi Arabia 3-1
- Kuwait 2-5
- Lebanon 4-3
- Malaysia 2-4
- Myanmar Iran w/o
- Oman 1-0
- Pakistan 1-3
- Philippines 1-1
- Pacific Oceania 3-1
- Qatar 4-0
- Singapore 3-0
- Sri Lanka 4-2
- Syria 2-4
- Thailand 1-2
- Tajikistan 4-0
- Turkmenistan 1-0
- Chinese Taipei 1-1
- United Arab Emirates 3-0
- Vietnam 3-1

Europe

- Bulgaria 0-1
- Great Britain 0-1
- Hungary w/o
- Ireland 0-1
- Israel 3-0
- Norway 0-1
- Poland 0-1
- Romania 0-2
- Switzerland 0-2
- Turkey 1-0

Americas

- United States 0-1

== Results ==
Year	Competition	Date	Surface	Location	Opponent	Score	Result
2010	Asia/Oceania Zone Group III Pool A	28 Apr	Clay	Tehran, Iran	Syria	1 : 3	Lost
2010	Asia/Oceania Zone Group III Pool A	30 Apr	Clay	Tehran, Iran	Kuwait	3 : 0	Won
2010	Asia/Oceania Zone Group III Promotion Pool	1 May	Clay	Tehran, Iran	Lebanon	2 : 0	Won
2010	Asia/Oceania Zone Group III Promotion Pool	2 May	Clay	Tehran, Iran	Vietnam	2 : 0	Won
2011	Asia/Oceania Zone Group II First round	4-6 Mar	Clay	Tehran, Iran	Indonesia	2 : 3	Lost
2011	Asia/Oceania Zone Group II Play-Offs	8-10 Jul	Clay (i)	Dededo, Guam	Pacific Oceania	1 : 4	Lost
2012	Asia/Oceania Zone Group III First round	25 Apr	Clay	Tehran, Iran	Vietnam	2 : 1	Won
2012	Asia/Oceania Zone Group III First round	26 Apr	Clay	Tehran, Iran	Kyrgyzstan	3 : 0	Won
2012	Asia/Oceania Zone Group III First round	27 Apr	Clay	Tehran, Iran	Kuwait	0 : 3	Lost
2012	Asia/Oceania Zone Group III Play-Offs	28 Apr	Clay	Tehran, Iran	Syria	1 : 2	Lost
2012	Asia/Oceania Zone Group III Play-Offs	29 Apr	Clay	Tehran, Iran	Malaysia	1 : 2	Lost
2013	Asia/Oceania Zone Group III First round	11 Sep	Hard	Dubai, UAE	Malaysia	1 : 2	Lost
2013	Asia/Oceania Zone Group III First round	12 Sep	Hard	Dubai, UAE	Oman	2 : 1	Won
2013	Asia/Oceania Zone Group III First round	13 Jul	Hard	Dubai, UAE	Hong Kong	1 : 2	Lost
2013	Asia/Oceania Zone Group III Play-Offs	14 Sep	Hard	Dubai, UAE	Pacific Oceania	2 : 1	Won
2013	Asia/Oceania Zone Group III Play-Offs	15 Sep	Hard	Dubai, UAE	United Arab Emirates	3 : 0	Won
2014	Asia/Oceania Zone Group III First round	11 Jun	clay	Tehran, Iran	United Arab Emirates	3 : 0	Won
2014	Asia/Oceania Zone Group III First round	12 Jun	clay	Tehran, Iran	Lebanon	3 : 0	Won
2014	Asia/Oceania Zone Group III First round	13 Jul	clay	Tehran, Iran	Singapore	3 : 0	Won
2014	Asia/Oceania Zone Group III Playoff	14 Jun	clay	Tehran, Iran	Syria	3 : 0	Won
2015	Asia/Oceania Zone Group II First round	6-8 Mar	hard	Palembang, Indonesia	Indonesia	0 : 5	Lost
2015	Asia/Oceania Zone Group II Playoff	17-19 Jul	clay	Tehran, Iran	Kuwait	1 : 3	Lost
2016	Asia/Oceania Zone Group III First round	11 Jul	clay	Tehran, Iran	Pacific Oceania	3 : 0	Won
2016	Asia/Oceania Zone Group III First round	13 Jul	clay	Tehran, Iran	Hong Kong	2 : 1	Won
2016	Asia/Oceania Zone Group III First round	15 Jul	clay	Tehran, Iran	Turkmenistan	3 : 0	Won
2016	Asia/Oceania Zone Group III Playoff	16 Jul	clay	Tehran, Iran	Syria	2 : 1	Won
2017	Asia/Oceania Zone Group II First round	3-5 Feb	hard	Islamabad, Pakistan	Pakistan	2 : 3	Lost
2017	Asia/Oceania Zone Group II Playoff	7-9 Apr	clay	Isfahan, Iran	Vietnam	5 : 0	Won
2018	Asia/Oceania Zone Group II First round	3-4 Feb	hard	Causeway Bay, Hong Kong	Hong Kong	0 : 4	Lost
2018	Asia/Oceania Zone Group II Playoff	7-8 Apr	hard (i)	Taipei, Taiwan	Chinese Taipei	0 : 4	Lost
2019	Asia/Oceania Zone Group III Round Robin	26 Jun	hard (i)	Kallang, Singapore	Syria	0 : 3	Lost
2019	Asia/Oceania Zone Group III Round Robin	27 Jun	hard (i)	Kallang, Singapore	Malaysia	0 : 3	Lost
2019	Asia/Oceania Zone Group III Round Robin	28 Jun	hard (i)	Kallang, Singapore	Qatar	1 : 2	Lost
2019	Asia/Oceania Zone Group III Playoff	29 Jun	hard (i)	Kallang, Singapore	Singapore	1 : 2	Lost
2020-21	Asia/Oceania Zone Group IV Round Robin	18 Oct	hard	Isa town, Bahrain	Kyrgyzstan	3 : 0	Won
2020-21	Asia/Oceania Zone Group IV Round Robin	20 Oct	hard	Isa town, Bahrain	Yemen	3 : 0	Won
2020-21	Asia/Oceania Zone Group IV Round Robin	21 Oct	hard	Isa town, Bahrain	Cambodia	3 : 0	Won
2020-21	Asia/Oceania Zone Group IV Playoff	23 Oct	hard	Isa town, Bahrain	Iraq	3 : 0	Won

== See also ==
- Davis Cup
- Iran Billie Jean King Cup team
