= Jirat Navasirisomboon =

Thai tennis player

Jirat Navasirisomboon จิรัฏฐ์ นวสิริสมบูรณ์
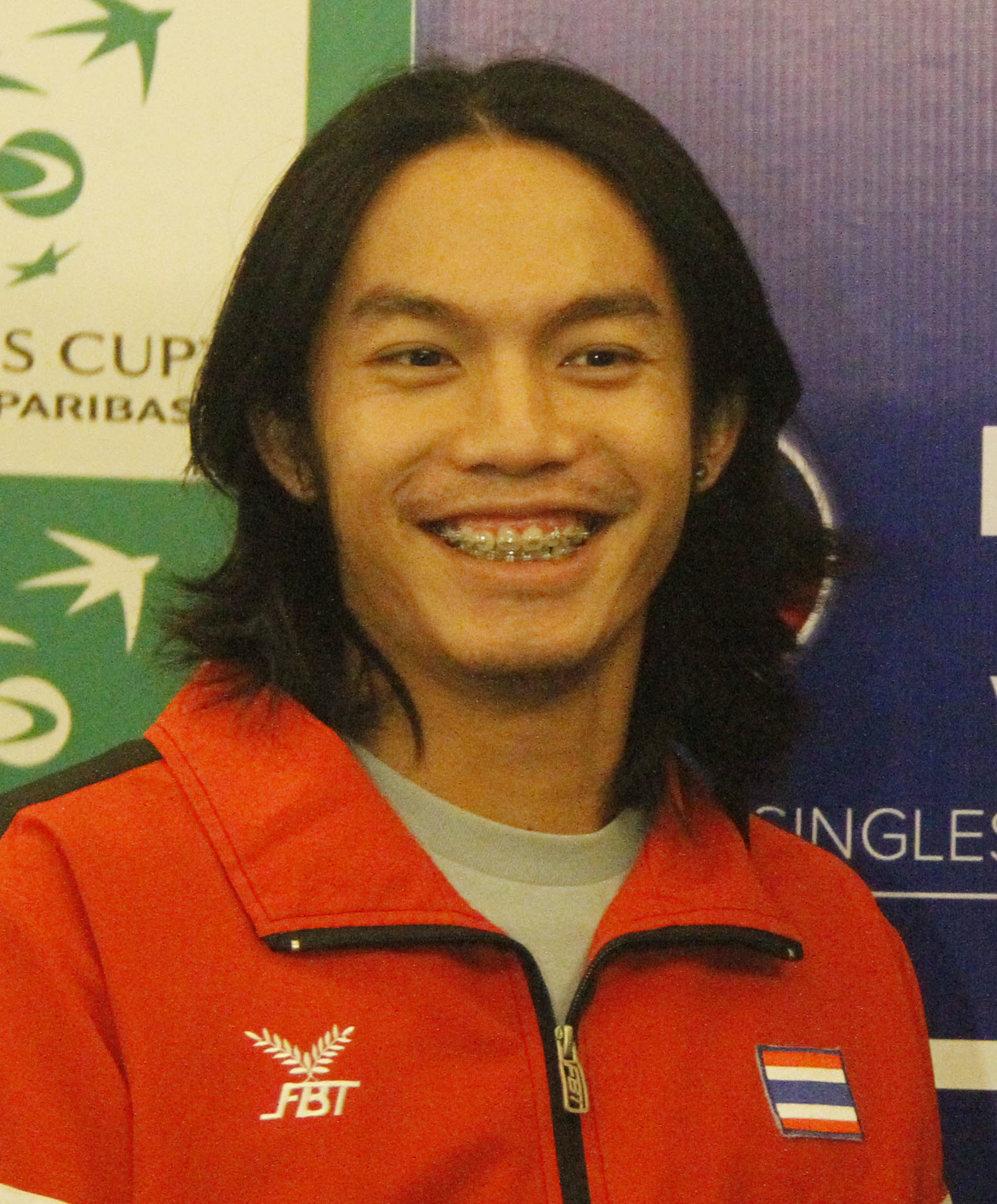
- Country (sports): Thailand
- Born: 17 November 1996 (age 29) Bangkok, Thailand
- Height: 1.75 m (5 ft 9 in)
- Plays: Right-handed (two-handed backhand)
- Prize money: $11,416

Singles
- Career record: 4–3 (at ATP Tour level, Grand Slam level, and in Davis Cup)
- Career titles: 0
- Highest ranking: No. 816 (31 October 2016)
- Current ranking: No. 929 (17 July 2017)

Doubles
- Career record: 0–0 (at ATP Tour level, Grand Slam level, and in Davis Cup)
- Career titles: 0
- Highest ranking: No. 1250 (3 July 2017)
- Current ranking: No. 1262 (17 July 2017)
Medal record
Men's Tennis
Representing Thailand
Southeast Asian Games
| Silver medal – second place | 2017 Kuala Lumpur | Men's Singles |
- Last updated on: 17 July 2017.

Jirat Navasirisomboon (Thai: จิรัฏฐ์ นวสิริสมบูรณ์; born 17 November 1996) is a Thai tennis player.

Navasirisomboon has a career high ATP singles ranking of 816 achieved on 31 October 2016. He also has a career high ATP doubles ranking of 1250 achieved on 3 July 2017.

Navasirisomboon represents Thailand in the Davis Cup. He defeated Kuwaiti tennis player Abdullah Maqdes in his first tie.
