= Wong Hong-kit =

Hong Kong tennis player

Wong Hong-kit 王康傑
- Country (sports): Hong Kong
- Born: 30 August 1998 (age 27) Hong Kong, China
- Plays: Right-handed (two handed-backhand)
- Coach: Eliot Zelts
- Prize money: $35,507

Singles
- Career record: 99–121
- Career titles: 0
- Highest ranking: No. 653 (31 December 2018)

Doubles
- Career record: 67–89
- Career titles: 1 ITF
- Highest ranking: No. 648 (30 September 2019)

Team competitions
- Davis Cup: 14–7

Wong Hong-kit (Chinese: 王康傑; born 30 August 1998; also known as Jack Wong) is a tennis and pickleball player from Hong Kong. His younger sister Cody Wong is also a professional tennis player.

Wong has a career high ATP singles ranking of No. 653 achieved on 31 December 2018 and a career high ATP doubles ranking of No. 648 achieved on 30 September 2019.

Wong represents Hong Kong at the Davis Cup, where he has a W/L record of 14–7.

== ITF Finals ==
=== Singles: 1 (0 titles, 1 runner–ups) ===
Legend $100,000 tournaments $80,000 tournaments $60,000 tournaments $25,000 tournaments $15,000 tournaments	Finals by surface Hard (0–1) Clay (0–0) Grass (0–0) Carpet (0–0)

Result	Date	Tournament	Tier	Surface	Opponents	Score
Loss	Jun 2018	ITF Hong Kong, Hong Kong	25,000	Hard	(Japan) Yuki Mochizuki	6–4, 2–6, 1–6

=== Doubles: 8 (1 titles, 7 runner–ups) ===
Legend $100,000 tournaments $80,000 tournaments $60,000 tournaments $25,000 tournaments $15,000 tournaments $10,000 tournaments	Finals by surface Hard (0–5) Clay (1–2) Grass (0–0) Carpet (0–0)

Result	W–L	Date	Tournament	Tier	Surface	Partner	Opponents	Score
Loss	0–1	Dec 2016	ITF Hong Kong, Hong Kong	10,000	Hard	(Hong Kong) Karan Rastogi	(Chinese Taipei) Cheng-Peng Hsieh (Hong Kong) Yeung Pak Long	7–5, 3–6, 4–10
Loss	0–2	Mar 2017	ITF Trivandrum, India	15,000	Clay	(Chinese Taipei) Hung Jui-Chen	(India) N.Sriram Balaji (India) Vishnu Vardhan	3–6, 5–7
Loss	0–3	Jul 2017	ITF Hong Kong, Hong Kong	15,000	Hard	(Hong Kong) Yeung Pak Long	(Japan) Shintaro Imai (Japan) Takuto Niki	5–7, 2–6
Loss	0–4	Aug 2017	ITF Nonthaburi, Thailand	15,000	Hard	(Hong Kong) Yeung Pak Long	(Thailand) Patcharapol Kawin (Thailand) Jirat Navasirisomboon	5–7, 0–6
Loss	0–5	Jan 2019	ITF Anning, China	15,000	Clay	(Chinese Taipei) Lee Kuan-Yi	(Chinese Taipei) Ti Chen (Chinese Taipei) Ray Ho	4–6, 6–3, 8–10
Win	1–5	Feb 2019	ITF Antalya, Turkey	15,000	Clay	(China) Runhao Hua	(Colombia) Felipe Mantilla (Colombia) Cristian Rodríguez	3–0, Retired
Loss	1–6	May 2022	ITF Heraklion, Greece	15,000	Hard	(Bulgaria) Simon Anthony Ivanov	(Japan) Shinji Hazawa (Japan) Shuichi Sekiguchi	4–6, 6–4, 10–12
Loss	1-7	Sep 2023	ITF Hong Kong	25,000	Hard	(Hong Kong) Coleman Wong	(Japan) Matsuda Ryuki (South Korea) Son Ji Hoon	5–7, 4–6
