= Enghelab Sport Complex =

Sports venue in Tehran, Iran

Coordinates: 35.784°N 51.398°E

The Enghelab Sport Complex (Persian: مجموعه ورزشی انقلاب), previously known as the Imperial Country Club (Persian: باشگاه شاهنشاهی) is a sport complex in Tehran, Iran. The complex was opened in 1958 under the rule of Mohammad Reza Pahlavi, the last Shah of Iran. The complex hosts about 10,000 people daily who participate in different activities.

== Facilities ==
The complex hosts adult-only and child-only pools for both males and females separately. It also includes extensive tennis facilities with 30 red clay outdoor tennis courts. It has 7 tennis courts, six of these have 1530 seats and can be increased to accommodate 2000 people. The central tennis stadium with three floors and 4130 seats and can be increased to accommodate also 7500 people.

The bowling club at the complex in is considered to be the largest bowling club in Iran. The construction of the club and facilities lasted for two years. It includes 24 automatic bowling lanes, an automatic scoring system, an automatic ball return mechanism, etc.

There is also a hall for women exclusively. The hall is built in an area of 2,500 meters and has an interior space of 700 meters. The sports complex within has 3 aerobics halls, Iran's largest gym, a beauty salon and massage parlour, hair and skin treatment, hydrotherapy, free consultancy services and more.
