= Patrick Chucri =

Tennis player and Entrepreneur

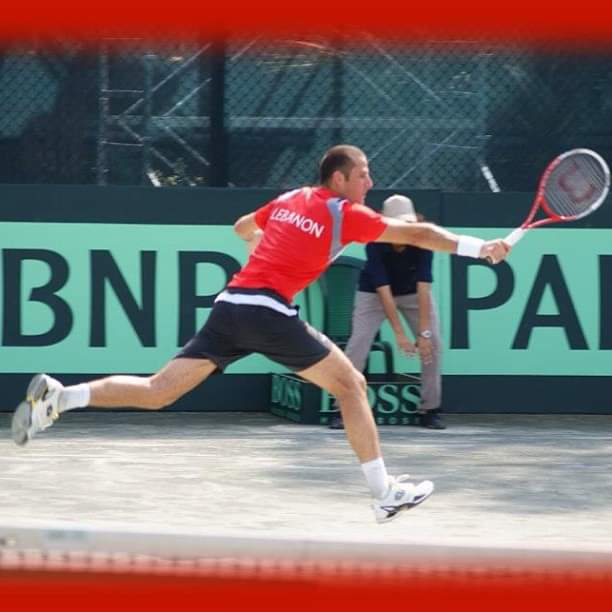
- Chucri during the 2013 Davis Cup
- Country (sports): Lebanon Belgium
- Residence: Dubai, UAE
- Born: 28 October 1981 (age 43) Beirut, Lebanon
- Height: 188 cm (6 ft 2 in)
- Plays: Right-handed

Singles
- Career record: 9–11 (Davis Cup)
- Highest ranking: No. 1053 (17 May 2004)

Doubles
- Career record: 13–15 (Davis Cup)
- Highest ranking: No. 594 (3 Oct 2005)

Patrick Chucri (Arabic: باتريك شكري; born 28 October 1981) is a Lebanese former professional tennis player. He represented Lebanon in the Davis Cup from 2002 to 2014, 2005 Mediterranean Games in Almeria, Spain and the 2006 Asian Games in Doha, Qatar.

Chucri, son of Habib and Randa, brother of Marcel and Cedric is a Beirut native, spent part of his childhood in Belgium and holds both nationalities. At the age of 16 he moved to Delray Beach, Florida to train at the International Tennis Academy. As a 17-year old he won the Lebanese Men's national championship and after graduating high school in Florida, he took up a scholarship to play collegiate tennis for the University of Mississippi (Ole Miss), captaining the team in his senior year. Chucri graduated in 2003 with a major in International Business.

Competing full-time after college, Chucri won five doubles titles on the ITF Futures circuit, four of those partnering with Ole Miss teammate Alexander Hartman. He had a best doubles ranking of 594 in the world and 1053 in singles.

Chucri was a regular member of the Lebanon Davis Cup team until 2014, with appearances in 31 ties. His Davis Cup career included a win over Ashkan Shokoofi in the deciding rubber of a 2003 tie in Tehran, where he came from 2–5 down in the fifth set to secure the tie for Lebanon.

In 2005, Chucri cut short his professional tennis career and began to pursue a career in the media and marketing industry with the Choueiri Group headquartered in Dubai, UAE. Chucri remained with the Group until 2021.

In October 2021 Chucri founded Match Point Investment LLC with its headquarters in Dubai, UAE where he holds the majority in shares and the position of Founder and CEO of the company. Match Point Investment LLC is the official master license holder of touchtennis for the UAE. touchtennis Sports Club (Br of Match Point Investment LLC) was launched in December 2022 and became the first indoor touchtennis club in the world.

In September 2024 Chucri pivoted from touchtennis to pickleball and rebranded the club as Picklers, the first Pickleball club in the Middle East.

== ITF Futures titles ==
=== Doubles: (5) ===
No.	Date	Tournament	Surface	Partner	Opponents	Score
1.	Aug 2003	Iran F1, Tehran	Clay	(Sweden) Alexander Hartman	(Oman) Khalid Al-Nabhani (Oman) Mohammed Al-Nabhani	6–3, 6–3
2.	Aug 2003	Iran F2, Tehran	Clay	(Sweden) Alexander Hartman	(Iran) Shahab Hassani-Nafez (Iran) Farshad Talavar	6–3, 6–2
3.	Apr 2005	Kuwait F2, Mishref	Hard	(Netherlands) Jasper Smit	(Egypt) Motaz Abou El Khair (France) Xavier Audouy	6–3, 6–4
4.	Jul 2005	Lebanon F1, Jounieh	Clay	(Sweden) Alexander Hartman	(France) Xavier Audouy (France) Laurent Recouderc	7–6^{(2)}, 2–6, 6–3
5.	Aug 2005	Lebanon F2, Jounieh	Clay	(Sweden) Alexander Hartman	(Monaco) Benjamin Balleret (France) Clément Morel	6–7^{(3)}, 7–6^{(2)}, 1–0 ret.
