= Amirvala Madanchi =

Iranian tennis player

- Country (sports): Iran
- Born: 17 July 1994 (age 31)
- Plays: Right-handed (two-handed backhand)
- Prize money: $13,250

Singles
- Career record: 1–0 (at ATP Tour level, Grand Slam level, and in Davis Cup)
- Career titles: 0 ITF
- Highest ranking: No. 1,072 (15 August 2016)

Doubles
- Career record: 2–2 (at ATP Tour level, Grand Slam level, and in Davis Cup)
- Career titles: 1 ITF
- Highest ranking: No. 837 (29 August 2016)

Amirvala Madanchi (born 17 July 1994) is an Iranian tennis player.

Madanchi has a career high ATP singles ranking of No. 1,072 achieved on 15 August 2016 and a career high ATP doubles ranking of No. 837 achieved on 29 August 2016.

Madanchi made his ATP main draw debut at the 2017 Dubai Tennis Championships in the doubles draw partnering Omar Alawadhi. He also represents Iran at the Davis Cup, where he has a W/L record of 3–2.
