= Abdullah Maqdes =

Kuwaiti tennis player

- Country (sports): Kuwait
- Born: 31 March 1987 (age 39) Kuwait City, Kuwait
- Plays: Right-handed
- Prize money: $44,208

Singles
- Career record: 35–19 (at ATP Tour level, Grand Slam level, and in Davis Cup)
- Career titles: 1 ITF
- Highest ranking: No. 496 (11 February 2013)

Doubles
- Career record: 12–13 (at ATP Tour level, Grand Slam level, and in Davis Cup)
- Career titles: 4 ITF
- Highest ranking: No. 581 (4 February 2013)

Team competitions
- Davis Cup: 43–21
- Last updated on: 21 September 2020.

Abdullah Maqdes (born 31 March 1987) is a Kuwaiti tennis player.

Maqdes has a career high ATP singles ranking of 496 achieved on 11 February 2013. He also has a career high ATP doubles ranking of 581 achieved on 4 February 2013. Maqdes has a career high combined juniors ranking of 18.

Maqdes made his ATP main draw debut at the 2010 Dubai Tennis Championships in the doubles draw.

Maqdes represents Kuwait in the Davis Cup where he has a W/L record of 43–21.

Maqdes represented the University of Southern California (USC) where his team won the NCAA title in 2010.

== ATP Challenger and ITF Futures finals ==
=== Singles: 4 (1–3) ===
ATP Challenger (0–0)
ITF Futures (1–3)

Result	W–L	Date	Tournament	Tier	Surface	Opponent	Score
Loss	0–1	Jul 2010	Tehran, Iran	Futures	Clay	(Hungary) Attila Balázs	2–5, 2–6
Win	1–1	Apr 2012	Doha, Qatar	Futures	Hard	(France) Jules Marie	6–1, 2–6, 6–4
Loss	1–2	Oct 2012	Meshref, Kuwait	Futures	Hard	(Chinese Taipei) Chen Ti	3–5, 1–6
Loss	1–3	Oct 2013	Heraklion, Greece	Futures	Hard	(France) Martin Vaïsse	4–6, 1–6

=== Doubles: 10 (4–6) ===
ATP Challenger (0–0)
ITF Futures (4–6)

Result	W–L	Date	Tournament	Tier	Surface	Partner	Opponents	Score
Loss	0–1	Jun 2006	Vierumäki, Finland	Futures	Clay	(United States) James Cerretani	(Estonia) Mait Künnap (Spain) Jordi Marsé-Vidri	4–6, 2–6
Win	1–1	Aug 2010	Nonthaburi, Thailand	Futures	Hard	(Germany) Sebastian Rieschick	(India) Vivek Shokeen (India) Ashutosh Singh	6–3, 7–5
Loss	1–2	May 2011	Kenitra, Morocco	Futures	Clay	(Egypt) Sherif Sabry	(Spain) Marc Fornell Mestres (Luxembourg) Mike Vermeer	7–5, 5–7, [3–10]
Loss	1–3	Feb 2012	Antalya, Turkey	Futures	Hard	(South Africa) Ruan Roelofse	(Bosnia and Herzegovina) Damir Džumhur (Bosnia and Herzegovina) Aldin Šetkić	4–6, 6–4, [5–10]
Win	2–3	Jul 2012	Duinbergen, Belgium	Futures	Clay	(South Africa) Jean Andersen	(Belgium) Joris De Loore (Chile) Juan Carlos Sáez	6–3, 3–6, [12–10]
Win	3–3	Sep 2012	Meshref, Kuwait	Futures	Hard	(South Africa) Ruan Roelofse	(France) Clément Reix (France) Romain Sichez	6–4, 6–4
Loss	3–4	Oct 2012	Doha, Qatar	Futures	Hard	(United Kingdom) Lewis Burton	(Poland) Adam Chadaj (Poland) Andriej Kapaś	7–5, 4–6, [6–10]
Win	4–4	Aug 2014	Innsbruck, Austria	Futures	Clay	(Kuwait) Mohammed Ghareeb	(Italy) Andrea Basso (Italy) Alessandro Ceppellini	6–0, 6–3
Loss	4–5	Jun 2015	Jounieh, Lebanon	Futures	Clay	(Kuwait) Mohammed Ghareeb	(Slovakia) Ivo Klec (Slovakia) Adrian Sikora	4–6, 7–6^{(7–5)}, [6–10]
Loss	4–6	Aug 2017	Sintra, Portugal	Futures	Clay	(Spain) Javier Pulgar García	(Portugal) Nuno Deus (Portugal) Bernardo Saraiva	5–7, 2–6
