= Mohammad Ghareeb =

Kuwaiti tennis player

Mohammed Ghareeb
- Country (sports): Kuwait
- Born: 22 July 1980 (age 45) Kuwait City, Kuwait
- Turned pro: 2000
- Plays: Right-handed (one-handed backhand)
- Prize money: $161,129

Singles
- Career record: 28–15
- Career titles: 0
- Highest ranking: No. 336 (17 July 2006)

Doubles
- Career record: 9–18
- Career titles: 0
- Highest ranking: No. 264 (9 June 2008)
Medal record
Representing Kuwait
Men's Tennis
Islamic Solidarity Games
Silver medal – second place	2005 Ta'if	Singles
Silver medal – second place	2013 Palembang	Team
Pan Arab Games
Gold medal – first place	2011 Doha	Doubles
Silver medal – second place	2011 Doha	Team

Mohammed Ghareeb (born July 22, 1980) is a tennis player from Kuwait. He plays right-handed with a single-handed backhand.

== Career ==
Unranked in singles as of February 2018, with a career-high ranking of No. 336 in 2006. In August 2016, Al Ghareeb was Kuwait's second ranked tennis player.

He played a competitive match against world No. 1 Roger Federer in the second round of the 2006 Dubai Tennis Championships, though he lost in straight sets. Ranked No. 488 at the time of the match, Ghareeb was expected to offer little resistance to Federer, but in a surprisingly competitive match, Al Ghareeb led 5–3 in the first set, and 3–2 in the second, before succumbing 7–6, 6–4. According to Federer, Al Ghareeb was "definitely the better player and I think only my experience helped me get through."

Al Ghareeb did not make a significant breakthrough at a top-level event, though in the 2007 Dubai Tennis Championships he won a set from Top 10 player Tomáš Berdych before losing 3–6, 6–3, 6–2. Al Ghareeb again received a wild-card to Dubai in 2008, losing 6–4, 6–0 in the first round to the fifth seed Nikolay Davydenko. Once again, he received a wild card in 2009, losing 7–5, 4–6, 4–6 in the first round to third seed Gilles Simon. Simon praised his opponent's play and expressed surprise at his low ranking, saying that Al Ghareeb "has a strange ranking, 400 or so, with his game, it's just unbelievable."

In 2007, he led the Kuwaiti team in its most successful Davis Cup season, reaching the Asia/Oceania Group II final with victories over Iran and Indonesia, before losing the division championship match to the Philippines in a 0–5 sweep. As of February 2018, Ghareeb had a 67–31 record in Davis Cup play for Kuwait (50-13 in singles), and was its longest-standing member.

== ATP Challenger and ITF Futures finals ==
=== Singles: 10 (5–5) ===
ATP Challenger (0–0)
ITF Futures (5–5)

Result	W–L	Date	Tournament	Tier	Surface	Opponent	Score
Loss	0–1	Apr 2003	Meshref, Kuwait	Futures	Hard	(Germany) Ivo Klec	6–3, 4–6, 4–6
Loss	0–2	Apr 2005	Meshref, Kuwait	Futures	Hard	(Romania) Florin Mergea	6–4, 3–6, 5–7
Loss	0–3	May 2007	Meshref, Kuwait	Futures	Hard	(Australia) Robert Smeets	3–6, 2–6
Loss	0–4	Jun 2007	Koszalin, Poland	Futures	Clay	(Poland) Dawid Olejniczak	6–7^{(5–7)}, 6–2, 4–6
Loss	0–5	Mar 2008	Gurgaon, India	Futures	Hard	(United States) Nathan Thompson	2–6, 2–6
Win	1–5	May 2008	Meshref, Kuwait	Futures	Hard	(Sweden) Johan Örtegren	6–0 ret.
Win	2–5	May 2009	Meshref, Kuwait	Futures	Hard	(Tunisia) Malek Jaziri	6–4, 6–4
Win	3–5	May 2009	Meshref, Kuwait	Futures	Hard	(Tunisia) Malek Jaziri	6–3, 7–6^{7–3}
Win	4–5	Sep 2012	Meshref, Kuwait	Futures	Hard	(Chinese Taipei) Chen Ti	5–7, 7–6^{8–6}, 6–2
Win	5–5	Sep 2013	Meshref, Kuwait	Futures	Hard	(India) Saketh Myneni	6–4, 6–1

=== Doubles: 19 (12–7) ===
ATP Challenger (2–1)
ITF Futures (10–6)

Result	W–L	Date	Tournament	Tier	Surface	Partner	Opponents	Score
Win	1–0	Jun 2001	Marrakech, Morocco	Futures	Clay	(Morocco) Jalal Chafai	(Australia) Kane Dewhurst (Australia) David McNamara	7–5, 4–6, 7–6^{(10–8)}
Win	2–0	Nov 2004	Bangkok, Thailand	Futures	Hard	(India) Sunil-Kumar Sipaeya	(United States) Minh Le (Japan) Hiroyasu Sato	2–6, 6–4, 6–4
Win	3–0	Dec 2005	Menzah, Tunisia	Futures	Hard	(Tunisia) Walid Jallali	(Poland) Pawel Dilaj (Poland) Robert Godlewski	6–2, 6–4
Loss	3–1	May 2006	Meshref, Kuwait	Futures	Hard	(India) Ravi-Shankar Pathanjali	(Germany) Ralph Grambow (Germany) Philipp Marx	6–4, 6–7^{(5–7)}, 3–6
Loss	3–2	May 2007	Meshref, Kuwait	Futures	Hard	(Australia) Greg Jones	(Pakistan) Aisam Qureshi (India) Purav Raja	6–2, 5–7, 2–6
Win	4–2	Jun 2007	Kraków, Poland	Futures	Clay	(Sweden) Kalle Flygt	(Sweden) Johan Brunström (Sweden) Robert Gustafsson	6–4, 6–7^{(6–8)}, 6–4
Win	5–2	Jun 2007	Koszalin, Poland	Futures	Clay	(Sweden) Johan Brunström	(Poland) Mateusz Kowalczyk (Poland) Grzegorz Panfil	6–3, 6–7^{(5–7)}, 7–6^{(7–5)}
Win	6–2	Jun 2007	Oslo, Norway	Futures	Clay	(Sweden) Ervin Eleskovic	(Italy) Fabio Colangelo (Italy) Francesco Zacchia	7–6^{(7–5)}, 6–4
Win	7–2	Jul 2007	Togliatti, Russia	Challenger	Hard	(Sweden) Johan Brunström	(Croatia) Ivan Cerović (France) Pierrick Ysern	7–6^{(7–4)}, 4–6, [13–11]
Win	8–2	Aug 2007	Tampere, Finland	Challenger	Hard	(Sweden) Johan Brunström	(Finland) Jukka Kohtamäki (Finland) Mika Purho	6–2, 7–6^{(7–5)}
Loss	8–3	May 2008	New Delhi, India	Challenger	Hard	(Ukraine) Illya Marchenko	(Australia) Colin Ebelthite (Australia) Sam Groth	6–2, 6–7^{(5–7)}, [8–10]
Win	9–2	May 2008	Meshref, Kuwait	Futures	Hard	(Sweden) Johan Örtegren	(India) Rohan Gajjar (United Kingdom) Ken Skupski	6–4, 3–6, [10–7]
Loss	9–3	Jul 2007	Modena, Italy	Futures	Clay	(France) Stéphane Robert	(Chile) Guillermo Hormazábal (Chile) Hans Podlipnik-Castillo	3–6, 2–6
Win	10–3	Nov 2008	Kish Island, Iran	Futures	Clay	(Monaco) Benjamin Balleret	(Italy) Mattia Livraghi (Italy) Marco Simoni	6–1, 6–2
Loss	10–4	Nov 2008	Kish Island, Iran	Futures	Clay	(Monaco) Benjamin Balleret	(Germany) Alexander Satschko (Germany) Marc-Andre Stratling	2–6, 6–1, [4–10]
Win	11–4	Sep 2012	Meshref, Kuwait	Futures	Hard	(Russia) Mikhail Vasiliev	(Italy) Alessandro Bega (Czech Republic) Jan Blecha	3–6, 7–6^{(7–5)}, [10–7]
Loss	11–5	Oct 2012	Meshref, Kuwait	Futures	Hard	(Russia) Mikhail Vasiliev	(United Kingdom) Lewis Burton (South Africa) Ruan Roelofse	6–7^{(5–7)}, 6–7^{(2–7)}
Loss	11–6	Oct 2012	Doha, Qatar	Futures	Hard	(Monaco) Benjamin Balleret	(Slovakia) Marko Danis (Slovakia) Marek Semjan	5–7, 6–7^{(2–7)}
Win	12–6	Aug 2014	Innsbruck, Austria	Futures	Clay	(Kuwait) Abdullah Maqdes	(Italy) Andrea Basso (Italy) Alessandro Ceppellini	6–0, 6–3
Loss	12–7	Jun 2015	Jounieh, Lebanon	Futures	Clay	(Kuwait) Abdullah Maqdes	(Slovakia) Ivo Klec (Slovakia) Adrian Sikora	4–6, 7–6^{(7–5)}, [6–10]
