= Shahin Khaledan =

Iranian tennis player

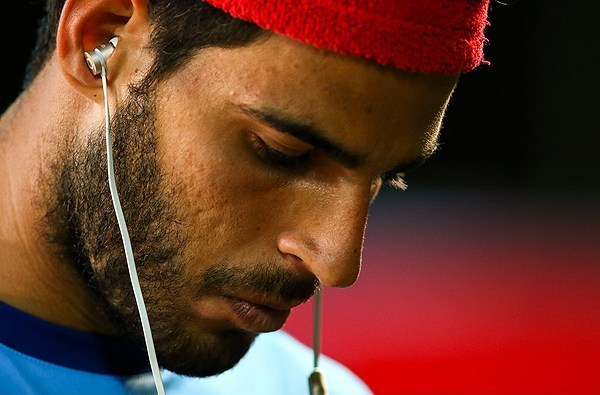
- Country (sports): Iran
- Born: 7 June 1990 (age 36) Isfahan, Iran
- Plays: Right-handed (two-handed backhand)
- Prize money: $11,120

Singles
- Career record: 20–13 (at ATP Tour level, Grand Slam level, and in Davis Cup)
- Career titles: 0
- Highest ranking: No. 912 (22 October 2012)
- Current ranking: No. 1334 (30 April 2018)

Doubles
- Career record: 1–3 (at ATP Tour level, Grand Slam level, and in Davis Cup)
- Career titles: 0
- Highest ranking: No. 1114 (5 December 2011)
- Current ranking: No. 1519 (30 April 2018)
- Last updated on: 3 May 2018.

Shahin Khaledan (born 7 June 1990) is an Iranian tennis player.

Khaledan has a career high ATP singles ranking of 912 achieved on 22 October 2012. He also has a career high ATP doubles ranking of 1114 achieved on 5 December 2011.

Khaledan represents Iran at the Davis Cup where he has a W/L record of 20–13.
