= Lebanon Davis Cup team =

Lebanese national tennis team

The Lebanon men's national tennis team represents Lebanon in Davis Cup tennis competition and are governed by the Fédération Libanaise de Tennis.

In 2024 Lebanon competed in World Group II. After their win against South Africa, they competed in the 2025 Play-offs where they lost to Peru.

== History ==
Lebanon competed in its first Davis Cup in 1957.

== Current team (2025) ==
- Benjamin Hassan
- Hady Habib
- Fadi Bidan

== Past members ==
- Mustapha El Natour
- Hasan Ibrahim
- Tamim Hallak
- Roey Tabet

== See also ==
- Davis Cup
- Lebanon Billie Jean King Cup team
