= Kuwait Davis Cup team =

National tennis team

The Kuwait Davis Cup team represents Kuwait in Davis Cup tennis competition and are governed by the Kuwait Tennis Federation.

Kuwait currently compete in the Asia/Oceania Zone of Group III.

== History ==
Kuwait competed in its first Davis Cup in 1989.

== See also ==
- Davis Cup
