= Tennis at the 2015 SEA Games – Men's doubles =

Men's doubles
- Tennis at the 2015 SEA Games

Final
- Champion: Sanchai Ratiwatana (THA); Sonchat Ratiwatana (THA)
- Runner-up: Ruben Gonzales (PHI); Jeson Patrombon (PHI)
- Score: 6–4, 6–4

Events
Singles	men	women
Doubles	men	women	mixed
Team	men	women
- SEA Games

Christopher Rungkat and Elbert Sie were the defending champions, but Sie was not selected for the Indonesian team. Rungkat partnered Sunu Wahyu Trijati, but they lost in the quarterfinals to Francis Alcantara and Treat Huey.

Sanchai and Sonchat Ratiwatana won the gold medal, defeating Ruben Gonzales and Jeson Patrombon in the final, 6–4, 6–4. Francis Alcantara and Treat Huey, and Warit Sorbutnark and Kittipong Wachiramanowong won the bronze medals.

== Medalists ==
Event	Gold	Silver	Bronze
Men's Doubles	Sanchai Ratiwatana (THA); Sonchat Ratiwatana (THA)	Ruben Gonzales (PHI); Jeson Patrombon (PHI)	Francis Alcantara (PHI); Treat Huey (PHI)
Men's Doubles	Sanchai Ratiwatana (THA); Sonchat Ratiwatana (THA)	Ruben Gonzales (PHI); Jeson Patrombon (PHI)	Warit Sornbutnark (THA); Kittipong Wachiramanowong (THA)

== Seeds ==
1. Sanchai Ratiwatana (THA) / Sonchat Ratiwatana (THA) (champion; gold medallist)
2. Ruben Gonzales (PHI) / Jeson Patrombon (PHI) (final; silver medallists)
3. Christopher Rungkat (INA) / Sunu Wahyu Trijati (INA) (quarterfinals)
4. Warit Sornbutnark (THA) / Kittipong Wachiramanowong (THA) (semifinals; bronze medallists)

== Draw ==
Key

- Q = Qualifier
- WC = Wild card
- LL = Lucky loser
- Alt = Alternate
- ITF = ITF entry
- PR = Protected ranking
- SR = Special ranking
- SE = Special exempt
- JE = Junior exempt
- JR = Junior Accelerator Programme entrant
- CO = College Accelerator Programme entrant
- NG = Next Gen Accelerator Program entrant
- w/o = Walkover
- r = Retired
- d = Defaulted

First round
1	Sa Ratiwatana (THA); So Ratiwatana (THA)	6	6
S Long (CAM); P Mam (CAM)	2	4
M Merzuki (MAS); S Syed Naguib (MAS)	6	6
A Naing (MYA); PS Oo (MYA)	0	3
F Alcantara (PHI); T Huey (PHI)	6	6
SSY Foo (SIN); M Meqsud Alam (SIN)	2	2
HA Trần (VIE); LG Trịnh (VIE)	2	2
3	C Rungkat (INA); SW Trijati (INA)	6	6
4	W Sornbutnark (THA); K Wachiramanowong (THA)	6	7
RA Hobbs (SIN); IY Ong (SIN)	3	5
A Deen Heshaam (MAS); M Zainal Abidin (MAS)	6	6
V Rasavady (LAO); S Simmalavong (LAO)	4	2
ZS Oo (MYA); AM Thant (MYA)	0	0
A Sasongko (INA); D Susanto (INA)	6	6
HT Nguyễn (VIE); MT Phạm (VIE)	6	4
2	R Gonzales (PHI); J Patrombon (PHI)	7	6

Quarterfinals
1	Sa Ratiwatana (THA); So Ratiwatana (THA)	6	6
M Merzuki (MAS); S Syed Naguib (MAS)	2	2
F Alcantara (PHI); T Huey (PHI)	4	6	[10]
3	C Rungkat (INA); SW Trijati (INA)	6	3	[5]
4	W Sornbutnark (THA); K Wachiramanowong (THA)	6	6
A Deen Heshaam (MAS); M Zainal Abidin (MAS)	2	3
A Sasongko (INA); D Susanto (INA)	6	4
2	R Gonzales (PHI); J Patrombon (PHI)	7	6

Semifinals
1	Sa Ratiwatana (THA); So Ratiwatana (THA)	6	4	[10]
F Alcantara (PHI); T Huey (PHI)	4	6	[8]
4	W Sornbutnark (THA); K Wachiramanowong (THA)	6	6	[8]
2	R Gonzales (PHI); J Patrombon (PHI)	2	7	[10]

Final
1	Sa Ratiwatana (THA); So Ratiwatana (THA)	6	6
2	R Gonzales (PHI); J Patrombon (PHI)	4	4
