= 2016 Davis Cup Asia/Oceania Zone Group II =

International tennis competition

The Asia/Oceania Zone was one of the three zones of the regional Davis Cup competition in 2016.

In the Asia/Oceania Zone there were four different tiers, called groups, in which teams competed against each other to advance to the upper tier. Winners in Group II advanced to the Asia/Oceania Zone Group I. Teams who lost their respective ties competed in the relegation play-offs, with winning teams remaining in Group II, whereas teams who lost their play-offs were relegated to the Asia/Oceania Zone Group III in 2017.

== Participating nations ==
Seeds:

1. Chinese Taipei
2. Thailand
3. Philippines
4. Indonesia

Remaining nations:

- Kuwait
- Malaysia
- Sri Lanka
- Vietnam

=== Draw ===
Play-offs
Mishref, Kuwait City (hard)
Malaysia | 1
Kuwait | 4
Surakarta, Indonesia (hard)
4 | Indonesia | 5
Sri Lanka | 0

First Round
Kaohsiung, Taiwan (hard)
1 | Chinese Taipei | 4
Malaysia | 1
Pasig, Philippines (indoor clay)
3 | Philippines | 5
Kuwait | 0
Surakarta, Indonesia (hard)
Vietnam | 3
4 | Indonesia | 2
Nonthaburi, Thailand (hard)
Sri Lanka | 2
2 | Thailand | 3

Second Round
Manila, Philippines (indoor clay)
1 | Chinese Taipei | 3
3 | Philippines | 1
Nonthaburi, Thailand (hard)
Vietnam | 0
Thailand | 5

Third Round
Nonthaburi, Thailand (hard)
1 | Chinese Taipei | 3
2 | Thailand | 2

- Malaysia and Sri Lanka relegated to Group III in 2017.
- Chinese Taipei promoted to Group I in 2017.

== First round ==
=== Chinese Taipei vs. Malaysia ===
Chinese Taipei
4
Kaohsiung Yangming Tennis Center, Kaohsiung, Taiwan
4 – 6 March 2016
Hard

Malaysia
1

| | | | 1 | 2 | 3 | 4 | 5 |
|---|---|---|---|---|---|---|---|
| 1 | (Chinese Taipei) (Malaysia) | Hung Jui-Chen; Mohd Assri Merzuki | 2; 6 | 7^{8} 6^{6} | 6; 0 | 1; 6 | 4; 6 |
| 2 | (Chinese Taipei) (Malaysia) | Huang Liang-Chi; Syed Mohd Agil Syed Naguib | 6; 0 | 6; 0 | 6; 2 |
| 3 | (Chinese Taipei) (Malaysia) | Huang Liang-Chi / Yi Chu-Huan; Mohd Assri Merzuki / Syed Mohd Agil Syed Naguib | 6; 1 | 6; 4 | 6; 2 |
| 4 | (Chinese Taipei) (Malaysia) | Huang Liang-chi; Mohd Assri Merzuki | 6; 1 | 6; 2 | 6; 2 |
| 5 | (Chinese Taipei) (Malaysia) | Hung Jui-Chen; Koay Hao-Sheng | 7; 5 | 6; 1 |

=== Philippines vs. Kuwait ===
Philippines
5
Valle Verde Country Club, Pasig, Philippines

4 – 6 March 2016
Clay (i)

Kuwait
0

| | | | 1 | 2 | 3 | 4 | 5 |
|---|---|---|---|---|---|---|---|---|
| 1 | (Philippines) (Kuwait) | Jeson Patrombon; Abdulrahman Alawadhi | 6; 0 | 6; 2 | 6; 1 |
| 2 | (Philippines) (Kuwait) | Ruben Gonzales; Mohammad Ghareeb | 7^{7} 6^{2} | 6; 2 | 1; 6 | 6^{6} 7^{8} | 5; 5 | retired |
| 3 | (Philippines) (Kuwait) | Francis Alcantara / Treat Huey; Abdulrahman Alawadhi / Abdulhamid Mubarak | 6; 1 | 6; 1 | 6; 2 |
| 4 | (Philippines) (Kuwait) | Jeson Patrombon; Abdulhamid Mubarak | 7^{7} 6^{5} | 6; 3 |
| 5 | (Philippines) (Kuwait) | Francis Alcantara; Ali Ghareeb | 6; 2 | 6; 1 |

=== Indonesia vs. Vietnam ===
Indonesia
2
Gelora Manahan Tennis Stadium Complex, Surakarta, Indonesia
4 – 6 March 2016
Hard

Vietnam
3

| | | | 1 | 2 | 3 | 4 | 5 |
|---|---|---|---|---|---|---|---|---|
| 1 | (Indonesia) (Vietnam) | Christopher Rungkat; Phạm Minh Tuấn | 6; 1 | 6; 1 | 6; 2 |
| 2 | (Indonesia) (Vietnam) | Aditya Hari Sasongko; Lý Hoàng Nam | 1; 6 | 4; 6 | 2; 6 |
| 3 | (Indonesia) (Vietnam) | Christopher Rungkat / Sunu-Wahyu Trijati; Lý Hoàng Nam / Nguyễn Hoàng Thiên | 3; 6 | 6; 3 | 6^{3} 7^{7} | 2; 6 |
| 4 | (Indonesia) (Vietnam) | Christopher Rungkat; Lý Hoàng Nam | 6; 4 | 6; 1 | 2; 0 | | | retired |
| 5 | (Indonesia) (Vietnam) | Aditya Hari Sasongko; Nguyễn Hoàng Thiên | 6; 3 | 2; 6 | 6; 3 | 4; 6 | 4; 6 |

=== Thailand vs. Sri Lanka ===
Thailand
3
National Tennis Development Center, Nonthaburi, Thailand
4 – 6 March 2016
Hard

Sri Lanka
2

| | | | 1 | 2 | 3 | 4 | 5 |
|---|---|---|---|---|---|---|---|
| 1 | (Thailand) (Sri Lanka) | Puriwat Chatpatcharoen; Harshana Godamanna | 3; 6 | 7^{7} 6^{4} | 3; 6 | 3; 6 |
| 2 | (Thailand) (Sri Lanka) | Pruchya Isaro; Sharmal Dissanayake | 6; 2 | 6; 3 | 6; 3 |
| 3 | (Thailand) (Sri Lanka) | Sanchai Ratiwatana / Sonchat Ratiwatana; Yasitha De Silva / Dineshkanthan Thangarajah | 6; 0 | 6; 2 | 6; 3 |
| 4 | (Thailand) (Sri Lanka) | Puriwat Chatpatcharoen; Sharmal Dissanayake | 6; 4 | 6; 2 | 3; 6 | 3; 6 | 1; 6 |
| 5 | (Thailand) (Sri Lanka) | Pruchya Isaro; Harshana Godamanna | 6; 4 | 6^{5} 7^{7} | 6; 3 | 7^{8} 6^{6} |

== Second round ==
=== Philippines vs. Chinese Taipei ===
Philippines
1
Philippine Columbian Association, Manila, Philippines
15 – 17 July 2016
Clay

Chinese Taipei
3

| | | | 1 | 2 | 3 | 4 | 5 |
|---|---|---|---|---|---|---|---|---|
| 1 | (Philippines) (Chinese Taipei) | Ruben Gonzales; Chen Ti | 2; 6 | 6; 2 | 2; 6 | 2; 6 |
| 2 | (Philippines) (Chinese Taipei) | Francis Alcantara; Huang Liang-Chi | 1; 6 | 6; 3 | 7^{7} 6^{4} | 1; 6 | 0; 1 | retired |
| 3 | (Philippines) (Chinese Taipei) | Treat Huey / Jeson Patrombon; Hung Jui-Chen / Wang Chieh-Fu | 6^{7} 7^{9} | 6; 2 | 6; 3 | 6; 4 |
| 4 | (Philippines) (Chinese Taipei) | Jeson Patrombon; Chen Ti | 6; 3 | 6^{4} 7^{7} | 0; 6 | 1; 6 |
| 5 | (Philippines) (Chinese Taipei) | Ruben Gonzales; Huang Liang-Chi | | | | | | not played |

=== Thailand vs. Vietnam ===
Thailand
5
The National Tennis Development Center, Nonthaburi, Thailand
15 – 17 July 2016
Hard

Vietnam
0

| | | | 1 | 2 | 3 | 4 | 5 |
|---|---|---|---|---|---|---|---|---|
| 1 | (Thailand) (Vietnam) | Kittipong Wachiramanowong; Lý Hoàng Nam | 3; 6 | 6; 1 | 6; 0 | 0; 0 | | retired |
| 2 | (Thailand) (Vietnam) | Pruchya Isaro; Nguyễn Hoàng Thiên | 5; 7 | 6; 2 | 6; 4 | 6; 2 |
| 3 | (Thailand) (Vietnam) | Sanchai Ratiwatana / Sonchat Ratiwatana; Lý Hoàng Nam / Nguyễn Đắc Tiến | 6; 4 | 6; 4 | 6; 4 |
| 4 | (Thailand) (Vietnam) | Pruchya Isaro; Phạm Minh Tuấn | 6; 3 | 4; 6 | 7^{7} 6^{4} |
| 5 | (Thailand) (Vietnam) | Kittipong Wachiramanowong; Nguyễn Hoàng Thiên | 6; 0 | 6; 3 |

== Play-offs ==
=== Kuwait vs. Malaysia ===
Kuwait
4
Kuwait Tennis Federation Center, Mishref, Kuwait

15 – 17 July 2016
Hard, Outdoor

Malaysia
1

| | | | 1 | 2 | 3 | 4 | 5 |
|---|---|---|---|---|---|---|---|
| 1 | (Kuwait) (Malaysia) | Mohammad Ghareeb; Mohd Assri Merzuki | 7^{7} 6^{4} | 7^{7} 6^{5} | 6; 4 |
| 2 | (Kuwait) (Malaysia) | Abdullah Maqdes; Syed Mohd Agil Syed Naguib | 6^{7} 7^{9} | 7^{11} 6^{9} | 6; 3 | 6; 3 |
| 3 | (Kuwait) (Malaysia) | Mohammad Ghareeb / Abdullah Maqdes; Mohd Assri Merzuki / Syed Mohd Agil Syed Naguib | 6^{5} 7^{7} | 6; 3 | 2; 6 | 6; 4 | 6; 4 |
| 4 | (Kuwait) (Malaysia) | Abdulrahman Alawadhi; Muhammad-Ashaari Bin Zainal-Abidin | 6; 3 | 4; 6 | 6; 3 |
| 5 | (Kuwait) (Malaysia) | Hamed Al Solaiteen; Koay Hao-Sheng | 2; 6 | 6^{6} 7^{8} |

=== Indonesia vs. Sri Lanka ===
Indonesia
5
Gelora Manahan Tennis Stadium Complex, Surakarta, Indonesia
15 – 17 July 2016
Hard

Sri Lanka
0

| | | | 1 | 2 | 3 | 4 | 5 |
|---|---|---|---|---|---|---|---|
| 1 | (Indonesia) (Sri Lanka) | David Agung Susanto; Harshana Godamanna | 6; 4 | 6; 4 | 6; 4 |
| 2 | (Indonesia) (Sri Lanka) | Christopher Rungkat; Yasitha De Silva | 6; 2 | 6; 0 | 6; 2 |
| 3 | (Indonesia) (Sri Lanka) | Christopher Rungkat / Sunu-Wahyu Trijati; Yasitha De Silva / Harshana Godamanna | 6; 2 | 6; 3 | 6; 0 |
| 4 | (Indonesia) (Sri Lanka) | Aditya Hari Sasongko; Nishangan Nadaraja | 6; 0 | 6; 1 |
| 5 | (Indonesia) (Sri Lanka) | David Agung Susanto; Yasitha De Silva | 6; 3 | 6; 1 |

== Third round ==
=== Chinese Taipei vs. Thailand ===
Thailand
2
The National Tennis Development Center, Nonthaburi, Thailand
16 – 18 September 2016
Hard

Chinese Taipei
3

| | | | 1 | 2 | 3 | 4 | 5 |
|---|---|---|---|---|---|---|---|---|
| 1 | (Thailand) (Chinese Taipei) | Kittipong Wachiramanowong; Yang Tsung-hua | 7^{8} 6^{6} | 6; 4 | 6; 1 |
| 2 | (Thailand) (Chinese Taipei) | Pruchya Isaro; Lee Kuan-yi | 6^{3} 7^{7} | 0; 5 | | | | retired |
| 3 | (Thailand) (Chinese Taipei) | Sanchai Ratiwatana / Sonchat Ratiwatana; Hung Jui-chen / Wang Chieh-fu | 7; 5 | 6; 2 | 7^{7} 6^{4} |
| 4 | (Thailand) (Chinese Taipei) | Pruchya Isaro; Yang Tsung-hua | 3; 6 | 4; 6 | 0; 0 | | | retired |
| 5 | (Thailand) (Chinese Taipei) | Kittipong Wachiramanowong; Lee Kuan-yi | 6; 4 | 3; 6 | 2; 6 | 6^{4} 7^{7} |
