= Tennis at the 2015 SEA Games – Mixed doubles =

Mixed doubles
- Tennis at the 2015 SEA Games

Final
- Champion: Denise Dy (PHI); Treat Huey (PHI)
- Runner-up: Peangtarn Plipuech (THA); Sonchat Ratiwatana (THA)
- Score: 7–6, 6–4

Events
Singles	men	women
Doubles	men	women	mixed
Team	men	women
← 2011 ·	SEA Games	· 2019 →

Denise Dy and Treat Huey were the defending champions and successfully defended their title, defeating Peangtarn Plipuech and Sonchat Ratiwatana in the final, 7–6, 6–4.

Jessy Rompies and Sunu Wahyu Trijati, and Tamarine Tanasugarn and Sanchai Ratiwatana won the bronze medals.

== Medalists ==
Event	Gold	Silver	Bronze
Mixed Doubles	Denise Dy (PHI); Treat Huey (PHI)	Peangtarn Plipuech (THA); Sonchat Ratiwatana (THA)	Jessy Rompies (INA); Sunu Wahyu Trijati (INA)
Mixed Doubles	Denise Dy (PHI); Treat Huey (PHI)	Peangtarn Plipuech (THA); Sonchat Ratiwatana (THA)	Tamarine Tanasugarn (THA); Sanchai Ratiwatana (THA)

== Seeds ==
1. Peangtarn Plipuech (THA) / Sonchat Ratiwatana (THA) (final; Silver medallists)
2. Tamarine Tanasugarn (THA) / Sanchai Ratiwatana (THA) (semifinals; Bronze medallists)
3. Jessy Rompies (INA) / Sunu Wahyu Trijati (INA) (semifinals; Bronze medallists)
4. Denise Dy (PHI) / Treat Huey (PHI) (champions; Gold medallists)
5. Ayu Fani Damayanti (INA) / Aditya Sasongko (INA) (quarterfinals)
6. Yus Syazlin Yusri (MAS) / Mohd Merzuki (MAS) (quarterfinals)

== Draw ==
=== Key ===
- Q = Qualifier
- WC = Wild card
- LL = Lucky loser
- Alt = Alternate
- ITF = ITF entry
- PR = Protected ranking
- SR = Special ranking
- SE = Special exempt
- JE = Junior exempt
- JR = Junior Accelerator Programme entrant
- CO = College Accelerator Programme entrant
- NG = Next Gen Accelerator Program entrant
- w/o = Walkover
- r = Retired
- d = Defaulted

=== Finals ===
Semifinals
1	Peangtarn Plipuech (THA); Sonchat Ratiwatana (THA)	6	6
3	Jessy Rompies (INA); Sunu Wahyu Trijati (INA)	4	1
4	Denise Dy (PHI); Treat Huey (PHI)	6	6
2	Tamarine Tanasugarn (THA); Sanchai Ratiwatana (THA)	2	3

Final
1	Peangtarn Plipuech (THA); Sonchat Ratiwatana (THA)	6	4
4	Denise Dy (PHI); Treat Huey (PHI)	7	6

=== Top half ===
First round
A Tun (MYA); A Naing (MYA)	1	2
K Iglupas (PHI); F Alcantara (PHI)	6	6

Second round
1	Pe Plipuech (THA); So Ratiwatana (THA)	6	6
K Iglupas (PHI); F Alcantara (PHI)	4	4
AD Ka (CAM); K Bun (CAM)	6	6	[8]
6	YS Yusri (MAS); M Merzuki (MAS)	2	7	[10]
3	J Rompies (INA); SW Trijati (INA)	6	6
PK Huỳnh (VIE); HA Trần (VIE)	1	2
S Peng (SIN); C-y Liu (SIN)	7	7
D Nilaxay (LAO); S Phaphithak (LAO)	5	5

Quarterfinals
1	Pe Plipuech (THA); So Ratiwatana (THA)	6	6
6	YS Yusri (MAS); M Merzuki (MAS)	0	4
3	J Rompies (INA); SW Trijati (INA)	6	6
S Peng (SIN); C-y Liu (SIN)	1	1

Semifinals
1	Pe Plipuech (THA); So Ratiwatana (THA)	6	6
3	J Rompies (INA); SW Trijati (INA)	4	1

=== Bottom half ===
First round

Second round
5	AF Damayanti (INA); A Sasongko (INA)	6	6
C Som (CAM); P Mam (CAM)	3	1
YT Lwin (MYA); PS Oo (MYA)	1	0
4	D Dy (PHI); T Huey (PHI)	6	6
J Noordin (MAS); S Syed Naguib (MAS)	7	6
TT Trần (VIE); MT Phạm (VIE)	5	4
A Devanthiran (SIN); M Meqsud Alam (SIN)	0	1
2	T Tanasugarn (THA); Sa Ratiwatana (THA)	6	6

Quarterfinals
5	AF Damayanti (INA); A Sasongko (INA)	1	1
4	D Dy (PHI); T Huey (PHI)	6	6
J Noordin (MAS); S Syed Naguib (MAS)	0	2
2	T Tanasugarn (THA); Sa Ratiwatana (THA)	6	6

Semifinals
4	D Dy (PHI); T Huey (PHI)	6	6
2	T Tanasugarn (THA); Sa Ratiwatana (THA)	2	3
