= Tennis at the 2015 SEA Games – Men's singles =

Men's singles
- Tennis at the 2015 SEA Games

Final
- Champion: Warit Sornbutnark (THA)
- Runner-up: David Susanto (INA)
- Score: 4–6, 6–3, 6–3

Events
Singles	men	women
Doubles	men	women	mixed
Team	men	women
- SEA Games

Christopher Rungkat was the defending champions having won the event in 2011, but lost in the quarterfinals to Jeson Patrombon.

Warit Sornbutnark won the gold medal, defeating David Susanto in the final, 4–6, 6–3, 6–3. Patrombon and Bun Kenny won the bronze medals.

== Medalists ==
Event	Gold	Silver	Bronze
Men's Singles	Warit Sornbutnark (THA)	David Susanto (INA)	Jeson Patrombon (PHI)
Men's Singles	Warit Sornbutnark (THA)	David Susanto (INA)	Bun Kenny (CAM)

== Seeds ==
1. Christopher Rungkat (INA) (quarterfinals)
2. Kittipong Wachiramanowong (THA) (quarterfinals)
3. Warit Sornbutnark (THA) (champion; gold medallist)
4. David Susanto (INA) (final; silver medallist)
5. Jeson Patrombon (PHI) (semifinals; bronze medallist)
6. Roy Alif Hobbs (SIN) (quarterfinals)

== Draw ==
=== Finals ===
Semifinals
5	Jeson Patrombon (PHI)	4	1
3	Warit Sornbutnark (THA)	6	6
4	David Susanto (INA)	6	7^{7}
Bun Kenny (CAM)	1	6^{4}

Final
3	Warit Sornbutnark (THA)	4	6	6
4	David Susanto (INA)	6	3	3

=== Top half ===
First round
IY Ong (SIN)	3	6	4
HT Nguyễn (VIE)	6	2	6

Second round
1	C Rungkat (INA)	6	6
HT Nguyễn (VIE)	3	1
M Zainal Abidin (MAS)	1	1
5	J Patrombon (PHI)	6	6
3	W Sornbutnark (THA)	6	6
S Simmalavong (LAO)	1	1
A Myo Thant (MYA)	2	3
D Kim (CAM)	6	6

Quarterfinals
1	C Rungkat (INA)	2	6
5	J Patrombon (PHI)	6	7
3	W Sornbutnark (THA)	6	6
D Kim (CAM)	2	2

Semifinals
5	J Patrombon (PHI)	4	1
3	W Sornbutnark (THA)	6	6

=== Bottom half ===
First round
R Gonzales (PHI)	6	6
LG Trịnh (VIE)	2	3

Second round
6	RA Hobbs (SIN)	6	6
ZS Oo (MYA)	4	3
A Deen Heshaam (MAS)	6	4
4	D Susanto (INA)	7	6
K Bun (CAM)	7	5	6
V Rasavady (LAO)	6	7	1
R Gonzales (PHI)	6	4
2	K Wachiramanowong (THA)	7	6

Quarterfinals
6	RA Hobbs (SIN)	3	6
4	D Susanto (INA)	6	7
K Bun (CAM)	6	6
2	K Wachiramanowong (THA)	2	4

Semifinals
4	D Susanto (INA)	6	7^{7}
K Bun (CAM)	1	6^{4}
