= 2013 Proton Malaysian Open – Doubles =

Doubles
- 2013 Proton Malaysian Open

Final
- Champions: (United States) Eric Butorac (South Africa) Raven Klaasen
- Runners-up: (Uruguay) Pablo Cuevas (Argentina) Horacio Zeballos
- Score: 6–2, 6–4

Events
Singles	Doubles
← 2012 ·	Proton Malaysian Open	· 2014 →

Alexander Peya and Bruno Soares were the defending champions, but chose not to participate this year.
Eric Butorac and Raven Klaasen won the title, defeating Pablo Cuevas and Horacio Zeballos in the final, 6–2, 6–4.

== Seeds ==
1. (Pakistan) Aisam-ul-Haq Qureshi / (Netherlands) Jean-Julien Rojer (first round)
2. (France) Julien Benneteau / (Serbia) Nenad Zimonjić (quarterfinals)
3. (Mexico) Santiago González / (United States) Scott Lipsky (first round)
4. (Philippines) Treat Huey / (United Kingdom) Dominic Inglot (quarterfinals)

== Draw ==
=== Key ===
- Q = Qualifier
- WC = Wild card
- LL = Lucky loser
- Alt = Alternate
- SE = Special exempt
- PR = Protected ranking
- ITF = ITF entry
- JE = Junior exempt
- w/o = Walkover
- r = Retired
- d = Defaulted
- SR = Special ranking

=== Draw ===
First round
1	(Pakistan) A-u-H Qureshi (Netherlands) J-J Rojer	3	6	[6]
(United States) E Butorac (South Africa) R Klaasen	6	4	[10]
(Argentina) C Berlocq (Argentina) F Delbonis	6	6
Alt	(France) A Mannarino (United States) M Russell	1	3
4	(Philippines) T Huey (United Kingdom) D Inglot	7^{7}	6
(Brazil) M Melo (Brazil) A Sá	6^{4}	2
(Czech Republic) L Dlouhý (Australia) P Hanley	4	5
(United States) R Ram (Romania) H Tecău	6	7
(Uruguay) P Cuevas (Argentina) H Zeballos	6	7^{8}
WC	(Spain) P Carreño-Busta (Malaysia) MA Merzuki	4	6^{6}
(Austria) J Knowle (Austria) J Melzer	6	6
3	(Mexico) S González (United States) S Lipsky	2	2
Alt	(South Africa) R de Voest (India) S Devvarman	6	6
(Spain) P Andújar (Romania) V Hănescu	3	2
WC	(India) Y Bhambri (Malaysia) SMA Syed Naguib	2	2
2	(France) J Benneteau (Serbia) N Zimonjić	6	6

Quarterfinals
(United States) E Butorac (South Africa) R Klaasen	6	6
(Argentina) C Berlocq (Argentina) F Delbonis	2	4
4	(Philippines) T Huey (United Kingdom) D Inglot	4	4
(United States) R Ram (Romania) H Tecău	6	6
(Uruguay) P Cuevas (Argentina) H Zeballos	2	7	[10]
(Austria) J Knowle (Austria) J Melzer	6	5	[7]
Alt	(South Africa) R de Voest (India) S Devvarman	3	6	[10]
2	(France) J Benneteau (Serbia) N Zimonjić	6	4	[7]

Semifinals
(United States) E Butorac (South Africa) R Klaasen	6	6
(United States) R Ram (Romania) H Tecău	3	2
(Uruguay) P Cuevas (Argentina) H Zeballos	0	6	[10]
Alt	(South Africa) R de Voest (India) S Devvarman	6	2	[7]

Final
(United States) E Butorac (South Africa) R Klaasen	6	6
(Uruguay) P Cuevas (Argentina) H Zeballos	2	4
