= 2016 Manila Challenger – Singles =

Singles
- 2016 Manila Challenger

Final
- Champion: (Russia) Mikhail Youzhny
- Runner-up: (Switzerland) Marco Chiudinelli
- Score: 6–4, 6–4

Events
Singles	Doubles
Manila Challenger	· 2017 →

2nd seed Mikhail Youzhny won his fifth career ATP Challenger Tour title, beating Marco Chiudinelli 6–4, 6–4. This was Youzhny's third consecutive ATP Challenger title, having won the KPN Bangkok Open and the KPN Bangkok Open II in the previous two weeks.

== Seeds ==
1. (Italy) Luca Vanni (second round)
2. (Russia) Mikhail Youzhny (champion)
3. (Slovakia) Lukáš Lacko (semifinals)
4. (Japan) Go Soeda (semifinals)
5. (Belgium) Kimmer Coppejans (second round)
6. (Italy) Thomas Fabbiano (second round)
7. (Netherlands) Igor Sijsling (quarterfinals)
8. (India) Somdev Devvarman (first round)

== Draw ==
=== Key ===
- Q = Qualifier
- WC = Wild card
- LL = Lucky loser
- Alt = Alternate
- SE = Special exempt
- PR = Protected ranking
- ITF = ITF entry
- JE = Junior exempt
- w/o = Walkover
- r = Retired
- d = Defaulted
- SR = Special ranking

=== Finals ===
Semifinals
PR	(Switzerland) Marco Chiudinelli	5	7^{7}	7^{7}
4	(Japan) Go Soeda	7	6^{5}	6^{4}
3	(Slovakia) Lukáš Lacko	6	6^{7}	5
2	(Russia) Mikhail Youzhny	1	7^{9}	7

Final
PR	(Switzerland) Marco Chiudinelli	4	4
2	(Russia) Mikhail Youzhny	6	6

=== Top half ===
First round
1	(Italy) L Vanni	6	6
SE	(Portugal) FF Silva	3	2
PR	(Switzerland) M Chiudinelli	6^{1}	6	6
Q	(India) VS Prashanth	7^{7}	4	4
(Italy) L Giustino	3	6	4
(China) Z Li	6	3	6
(Spain) O Roca Batalla	7	6^{0}	7^{7}
8	(India) S Devvarman	5	7^{7}	6^{4}
4	(Japan) G Soeda	7^{7}	6
(Italy) R Marcora	6^{4}	1
(South Korea) D-h Lee	4	7^{12}	2
(Japan) H Moriya	6	6^{10}	6
WC	(Philippines) A Lim	4	0
(France) D Guez	6	6
Q	(Croatia) N Mektić	3	7^{8}	3
6	(Italy) T Fabbiano	6	6^{6}	6

Second round
1	(Italy) L Vanni	3	6	4
PR	(Switzerland) M Chiudinelli	6	1	6
(China) Z Li	6	6^{7}	6
(Spain) O Roca Batalla	2	7^{9}	4
4	(Japan) G Soeda	6	1	6
(Japan) H Moriya	4	6	3
(France) D Guez	6	3	6
6	(Italy) T Fabbiano	1	6	3

Quarterfinals
PR	(Switzerland) M Chiudinelli	6	7^{7}
(China) Z Li	4	6^{1}
4	(Japan) G Soeda	6	3	6
(France) D Guez	3	6	4

Semifinals
PR	(Switzerland) M Chiudinelli	5	7^{7}	7^{7}
4	(Japan) G Soeda	7	6^{5}	6^{4}

=== Bottom half ===
First round
7	(Netherlands) I Sijsling	6	6
WC	(Philippines) R Gonzales	2	2
(Israel) A Weintraub	6	6
WC	(Philippines) FC Alcantara	1	3
(Serbia) P Krstin	6	4	0^{r}
(Italy) F Gaio	2	6	4
Q	(Chinese Taipei) J Wang	3	3
3	(Slovakia) L Lacko	6	6
5	(Belgium) K Coppejans	6	6
WC	(Philippines) J Patrombon	2	2
Q	(Denmark) F Nielsen	3	6^{3}
(Italy) G Naso	6	7^{7}
(Belarus) E Gerasimov	7	2	4
(Belgium) Y Mertens	5	6	6
SE	(Chinese Taipei) J Jung	2	6^{5}
2	(Russia) M Youzhny	6	7^{7}

Second round
7	(Netherlands) I Sijsling	6	6
(Israel) A Weintraub	2	2
(Italy) F Gaio	1	6	1
3	(Slovakia) L Lacko	6	3	6
5	(Belgium) K Coppejans	3	6^{4}
(Italy) G Naso	6	7^{7}
(Belgium) Y Mertens	3	4
2	(Russia) M Youzhny	6	6

Quarterfinals
7	(Netherlands) I Sijsling	4	2
3	(Slovakia) L Lacko	6	6
(Italy) G Naso	2	2
2	(Russia) M Youzhny	6	6

Semifinals
3	(Slovakia) L Lacko	6	6^{7}	5
2	(Russia) M Youzhny	1	7^{9}	7
