= 2012 Proton Malaysian Open – Singles =

Singles
- 2012 Proton Malaysian Open

Final
- Champion: (Argentina) Juan Mónaco
- Runner-up: (France) Julien Benneteau
- Score: 7–5, 4–6, 6–3

Details
- Draw: 28
- Seeds: 8

Events
| Singles | Doubles |
| ← 2011 · | Proton Malaysian Open | · 2013 → |

Janko Tipsarević was the defending champion but decided to participate at 2012 PTT Thailand Open instead.
Juan Mónaco won the title, beating Julien Benneteau 7–5, 4–6, 6–3 in the final.

== Seeds ==
1. (Spain) David Ferrer (semifinals)
2. (Argentina) Juan Mónaco (champion)
3. (Japan) Kei Nishikori (semifinals)
4. (Ukraine) Alexandr Dolgopolov (second round)
5. (Spain) Feliciano López (second round)
6. (Spain) Pablo Andújar (first round)
7. (France) Julien Benneteau (final)
8. (Austria) Jürgen Melzer (first round, retired because of a left quadriceps injury)

== Draw ==
=== Key ===
- Q = Qualifier
- WC = Wild card
- LL = Lucky loser
- Alt = Alternate
- SE = Special exempt
- PR = Protected ranking
- ITF = ITF entry
- JE = Junior exempt
- w/o = Walkover
- r = Retired
- d = Defaulted
- SR = Special ranking

=== Finals ===
Semifinals
1 | (Spain) David Ferrer | 4 | 1
7 | (France) Julien Benneteau | 6 | 6
3 | (Japan) Kei Nishikori | 2 | 6 | 6^{4}
2 | (Argentina) Juan Mónaco | 6 | 2 | 7^{7}

Final
7 | (France) Julien Benneteau | 5 | 6 | 3
2 | (Argentina) Juan Mónaco | 7 | 4 | 6

=== Top half ===
First round
Q | (United Kingdom) D Inglot | 5 | 3
(Russia) A Bogomolov Jr. | 7 | 6
WC | (Malaysia) AE Heshaam | 2 | 1
(Netherlands) I Sijsling | 6 | 6
(Slovakia) L Lacko | 3 | 6^{3}
5 | (Spain) F López | 6 | 7^{7}
(Colombia) A Falla | 7^{7} | 4
(United States) R Ram | 6^{4} | 2^{r}
(Australia) M Ebden | 6 | 7^{7}
WC | (Russia) P Davydenko | 0 | 6^{3}
(Argentina) C Berlocq | 6^{2} | 3
7 | (France) J Benneteau | 7^{7} | 6

Second round
1 | (Spain) D Ferrer | 6 | 6
(Russia) A Bogomolov Jr. | 4 | 2
(Netherlands) I Sijsling | 7^{7} | 7^{7}
5 | (Spain) F López | 6^{0} | 6^{2}
4 | (Ukraine) A Dolgopolov | 3 | 6 | 3
(Colombia) A Falla | 6 | 3 | 6
(Australia) M Ebden | 5 | 2
7 | (France) J Benneteau | 7 | 6

Quarterfinals
1 | (Spain) D Ferrer | 4 | 6 | 6
(Netherlands) I Sijsling | 6 | 3 | 4
(Colombia) A Falla | 2 | 2
7 | (France) J Benneteau | 6 | 6

Semifinals
1 | (Spain) D Ferrer | 4 | 1
7 | (France) J Benneteau | 6 | 6

=== Bottom half ===
First round
6 | (Spain) P Andújar | 3 | 2
(Uzbekistan) D Istomin | 6 | 6
LL | (India) S Singh | 5 | 4
(Russia) N Davydenko | 7 | 6
Q | (Austria) J Knowle | 1 | 4
(Spain) A Ramos | 6 | 6
8 | (Austria) J Melzer | 4 | 0^{r}
(Canada) V Pospisil | 6 | 2
Q | (United States) M Yani | 6 | 7^{7}
(United States) B Baker | 3 | 6^{4}
Q | (Italy) R Ghedin | 3 | 3
WC | (Chinese Taipei) J Wang | 6 | 6

Second round
(Uzbekistan) D Istomin | 5 | 4
(Russia) N Davydenko | 7 | 6
(Spain) A Ramos | 7^{7} | 2 | 1
3 | (Japan) K Nishikori | 6^{5} | 6 | 6
(Canada) V Pospisil | 6 | 7
Q | (United States) M Yani | 3 | 5
WC | (Chinese Taipei) J Wang | 4 | 5
2 | (Argentina) J Mónaco | 6 | 7

Quarterfinals
(Russia) N Davydenko | 4 | r
3 | (Japan) K Nishikori | 6
(Canada) V Pospisil | 3 | 4
2 | (Argentina) J Mónaco | 6 | 6

Semifinals
3 | (Japan) K Nishikori | 2 | 6 | 6^{4}
2 | (Argentina) J Mónaco | 6 | 2 | 7^{7}

== Qualifying ==
=== Seeds ===
1. (Canada) Vasek Pospisil (moved to main draw)
2. (United States) Michael Yani (qualified)
3. (Italy) Riccardo Ghedin (qualified)
4. (Indonesia) Christopher Rungkat (second round)
5. (India) Sanam Singh (qualifying competition, lucky loser)
6. (Japan) Toshihide Matsui (qualifying competition)
7. (Australia) Nick Lindahl (second round)
8. (South Korea) Jun Woong-sun (second round)

=== Qualifiers ===
1. (United Kingdom) Dominic Inglot
2. (United States) Michael Yani
3. (Italy) Riccardo Ghedin
4. (Austria) Julian Knowle

=== Lucky loser ===
1. (India) Sanam Singh

=== Draw ===
==== First qualifier ====
| First round | | | | Second round | | | | Qualifying competition |
| | | | | 1 | (Canada) Vasek Pospisil |
| | | | | | (United States) Austin Karosi | w/o |
| | | | | | | | | (United States) Austin Karosi | 2 | 2 |
| | (United Kingdom) Dominic Inglot | 6 | 6 | | | | | (United Kingdom) Dominic Inglot | 6 | 6 |
| WC | (Malaysia) Ahmed Deedat Abdul Razak | 1 | 4 | | (United Kingdom) Dominic Inglot | 6 | 6 |
| | | | | 7 | (Australia) Nick Lindahl | 3 | 4 |

==== Second qualifier ====
| First round | | | | Second round | | | | Qualifying competition |
| | | | | 2 | (United States) Michael Yani | 7 | 6 |
| | | | | WC | (Malaysia) Syed Mohd Agil Syed Naguib | 5 | 1 |
| | | | | | | | | 2 | (United States) Michael Yani | 6 | 7^{7} |
| WC | (Malaysia) Colin Wei Ming Wong | 3 | 1 | | | | | 5 | (India) Sanam Singh | 4 | 6^{4} |
| WC | (Malaysia) Si Yew Ming | 6 | 6 | WC | (Malaysia) Si Yew Ming | 0 | 1 |
| | | | | 5 | (India) Sanam Singh | 6 | 6 |

==== Third qualifier ====
| First round | | | | | Second round | | | | Qualifying competition |
| | | | | | 3 | (Italy) Riccardo Ghedin | 6 | 6 |
| | | | | | | (Austria) Alexander Peya | 2 | 4 |
| | | | | | | | | | 3 | (Italy) Riccardo Ghedin | 4 | 6 | 7^{10} |
| WC | (Malaysia) Mohd Assri Merzuki | 2 | 7 | 2 | | | | | | (Philippines) Treat Conrad Huey | 6 | 4 | 6^{8} |
| | (Philippines) Treat Conrad Huey | 6 | 5 | 6 | | (Philippines) Treat Conrad Huey | 6 | 7^{7} |
| | | | | | 8 | (South Korea) Jun Woong-sun | 3 | 6^{3} |

==== Fourth qualifier ====
Second round
4 | (Indonesia) Christopher Rungkat | 3 | 2
(Austria) Julian Knowle | 6 | 6
WC | (Brazil) Bruno Soares | 6^{5} | 4^{r}
6 | (Japan) Toshihide Matsui | 7^{7} | 3

Qualifying competition
(Austria) Julian Knowle | 3 | 6 | 6
6 | (Japan) Toshihide Matsui | 6 | 3 | 4
