= Tennis at the 2015 SEA Games – Men's team =

Men's team
- Tennis at the 2015 SEA Games

Final
- Champion: Thailand (THA)
- Runner-up: Indonesia (INA)
- Score: 2–1

Events
| Singles | men | women |
| Doubles | men | women | mixed |
| Team | men | women |
- SEA Games

Indonesia were the defending champions having won the event in 2011, however they lost in the final to Thailand, 2–1.

== Medalists ==
| Event | Gold | Silver | Bronze |
|---|---|---|---|
| Men's Team | Thailand Sanchai Ratiwatana; Sonchat Ratiwatana; Danai Udomchoke; Kittipong Wachiramanowong | Indonesia Christopher Rungkat; Aditya Sasongko; David Susanto; Sunu Wahyu Trijati | Malaysia Ariez Deen Heshaam; Mohd Merzuki; Syed Syed Naguib; Muhammad Zainal Abidin |
| Men's Team | Thailand Sanchai Ratiwatana; Sonchat Ratiwatana; Danai Udomchoke; Kittipong Wachiramanowong | Indonesia Christopher Rungkat; Aditya Sasongko; David Susanto; Sunu Wahyu Trijati | Philippines Francis Alcantara; Ruben Gonzales; Treat Huey; Jeson Patrombon |

== Draw ==
First round 6 June 2015
1 | Thailand
Bye
Myanmar | 0
Vietnam | 3
Singapore
Bye
Bye
3 | Malaysia
4 | Philippines
Bye
Bye
Cambodia
Laos
Bye
Bye
2 | Indonesia

Quarterfinals; 6 June / 7 June 2015
1 | Thailand | 2
Vietnam | 0
Singapore | 0
3 | Malaysia | 3
4 | Philippines | 3
Cambodia | 0
Laos | 0
2 | Indonesia | 3

Semifinals; 8 June 2015
1 | Thailand | 3
3 | Malaysia | 0
4 | Philippines | 1
2 | Indonesia | 2

Final; 9 June 2015
1 | Thailand | 2
2 | Indonesia | 1

== First round ==
| 6 June | Myanmar | 0–3 | Vietnam |

| Aung Naing | 0–2 | Nguyễn Hoàng Thiên | 0–6, 1–6 |
| Zaw San Oo | 0–2 | Phạm Minh Tuấn | 2–6, 0–6 |
| Aung Naing / Aung Myo Thant | 0–2 | Trần Hoàng Anh / Trịnh Linh Giang | 2–6, 0–6 |

== Quarterfinals ==
| 7 June | Thailand | 2–0 | Vietnam |

| Kittipong Wachiramanowong | 2–1 | Nguyễn Hoàng Thiên | 6–3, 4–6, 6–4 |
| Danai Udomchoke | 2–0 | Trịnh Linh Giang | 6–3, 6–3 |
| Sanchai Ratiwatana / Sonchat Ratiwatana | 0–0 | Nguyễn Hoàng Thiên / Phạm Minh Tuấn | not played |

| 7 June | Singapore | 0–3 | Malaysia |

| Isaac Yong Ong | 1–2 | Ariez Deen Heshaam | 3–6, 6–2, 3–6 |
| Roy Alif Hobbs | 1–2 | Syed Syed Naguib | 2–6, 6–2, 4–6 |
| Liu Chong-yu / Muhammad Meqsud Alam | 0–2 | Mohd Merzuki / Muhammad Zainal Abidin | 5–7, 0–6 |

| 6 June | Philippines | 3–0 | Cambodia |

| Ruben Gonzales | 2–0 | Mam Phalkun | 6–3, 7–5 |
| Jeson Patrombon | 2–1 | Bun Kenny | 6–2, 2–6, 6–2 |
| Francis Alcantara / Treat Huey | 2–0 | Kim Delton / Long Samneang | 6–3, 6–1 |

| 6 June | Laos | 0–3 | Indonesia |

| Sataporn Simmalavong | 0–2 | Aditya Sasongko | 0–6, 1–6 |
| Vitaya Rasavady | 0–2 | Christopher Rungkat | 3–6, 1–6 |
| Somchay Phaphithak / Sataporn Simmalavong | 0–2 | Sunu Wahyu Trijati / David Susanto | 3–6, 0–6 |

== Semifinals ==
| 8 June | Thailand | 3–0 | Malaysia |

| Kittipong Wachiramanowong | 2–0 | Mohd Merzuki | 6–2, 6–1 |
| Danai Udomchoke | 2–0 | Syed Syed Naguib | 6–1, 6–0 |
| Sanchai Ratiwatana / Sonchat Ratiwatana | 2–0 | Ariez Deen Heshaam / Muhammad Zainal Abidin | 6–1, 6–0 |

| 8 June | Philippines | 1–2 | Indonesia |

| Ruben Gonzales | 2–0 | Aditya Sasongko | 6–3, 7–6 |
| Jeson Patrombon | 0–2 | Christopher Rungkat | 6–7(3), 0–6 |
| Treat Huey / Francis Alcantara | 0–2 | Sunu Wahyu Trijati / David Susanto | 3–6, 2–6 |

== Final ==
| 9 June | Thailand | 2–1 | Indonesia |

| Kittipong Wachiramanowong | 0–2 | Aditya Sasongko | 4–6, 5–7 |
| Danai Udomchoke | 2–0 | Christopher Rungkat | 6–0, 6–4 |
| Sanchai Ratiwatana / Sonchat Ratiwatana | 2–0 | Christopher Rungkat / Sunu Wahyu Trijati | 6–4, 6–4 |
