= 2012 Proton Malaysian Open =

- Date: 24–30 September
- Edition: 4th
- Category: World Tour 250
- Draw: 28S / 16D
- Prize money: $850,000
- Surface: Hard
- Location: Kuala Lumpur, Malaysia

Champions

Singles
- (Argentina) Juan Mónaco

Doubles
- (Austria) Alexander Peya / (Brazil) Bruno Soares
← 2011 ·	Proton Malaysian Open	· 2013 →

The 2012 Proton Malaysian Open was a professional men's tennis tournament played on hard courts. It was the fourth edition of the tournament, and part of the 2012 ATP World Tour. It took place in Kuala Lumpur, Malaysia between 24 and 30 September 2012. Juan Mónaco won the singles title.

== Singles main-draw entrants ==
=== Seeds ===
Country	Player	Rank^{1}	Seed
ESP	David Ferrer	5	1
ARG	Juan Mónaco	11	2
JPN	Kei Nishikori	17	3
UKR	Alexandr Dolgopolov	19	4
ESP	Feliciano López	32	5
ESP	Pablo Andújar	33	6
FRA	Julien Benneteau	34	7
AUT	Jürgen Melzer	37	8

- ^{1} Rankings are as of 17 September 2012

=== Other entrants ===
The following players received wildcards into the singles main draw:

- (Russia) Philip Davydenko
- (Malaysia) Ariez Elyaas Deen Heshaam
- (Chinese Taipei) Jimmy Wang

The following players received entry from the qualifying draw:

- (Italy) Riccardo Ghedin
- (United Kingdom) Dominic Inglot
- (Austria) Julian Knowle
- (United States) Michael Yani

The following player received entry as lucky loser:

- (India) Sanam Singh

=== Withdrawals ===
- (Cyprus) Marcos Baghdatis
- (Colombia) Santiago Giraldo
- (Slovakia) Martin Kližan (oblique muscle injury)
- (United States) Sam Querrey
- (Italy) Andreas Seppi (fatigue)

=== Retirements ===
- (Russia) Nikolay Davydenko
- (Austria) Jürgen Melzer (left quadriceps injury)

== ATP doubles main-draw entrants ==
=== Seeds ===
Country	Player	Country	Player	Rank^{1}	Seed
POL	Mariusz Fyrstenberg	POL	Marcin Matkowski	21	1
ITA	Daniele Bracciali	BRA	Marcelo Melo	45	2
AUT	Alexander Peya	BRA	Bruno Soares	56	3
AUT	Julian Knowle	SVK	Filip Polášek	59	4

- Rankings are as of 17 September 2012

=== Other entrants ===
The following pairs received wildcards into the doubles main draw:

- (Malaysia) Mohd Assri Merzuki / (Malaysia) Syed Mohammad Agil Naguib
- (Malaysia) Si Yew Ming / (Chinese Taipei) Jimmy Wang

The following pair received entry as alternates:

- (Canada) Vasek Pospisil / (India) Sanam Singh

=== Withdrawals ===
- (Austria) Jürgen Melzer (left quadriceps injury)

=== Retirements ===
- (Slovakia) Martin Kližan (oblique muscle injury)

== Finals ==
=== Singles ===
- (Argentina) Juan Mónaco defeated (France) Julien Benneteau 7–5, 4–6, 6–3

=== Doubles ===
- (Austria) Alexander Peya / (Brazil) Bruno Soares defeated (United Kingdom) Colin Fleming / (United Kingdom) Ross Hutchins, 5–7, 7–5, [10–7]
