= 2016 Manila Challenger – Doubles =

Doubles
- 2016 Manila Challenger
- 2015 Champions: foot

Final
- Champions: (Sweden) Johan Brunström (Denmark) Frederik Nielsen
- Runners-up: (Philippines) Francis Casey Alcantara (Indonesia) Christopher Rungkat
- Score: 6–2, 6–2

Events
Singles	Doubles
Manila Challenger	· 2017 →

2nd seeds Johan Brunström and Frederik Nielsen won the title, beating Francis Casey Alcantara and Christopher Rungkat 6–2, 6–2

== Seeds ==
1. (Serbia) Ilija Bozoljac / (Sweden) Andreas Siljeström (first round)
2. (Sweden) Johan Brunström / (Denmark) Frederik Nielsen (champion)
3. (Croatia) Antonio Šančić / (Netherlands) Mark Vervoort (first round)
4. (Thailand) Sanchai Ratiwatana / (Thailand) Sonchat Ratiwatana (withdrew, Semifinals)

== Draw ==
=== Key ===
- Q = Qualifier
- WC = Wild card
- LL = Lucky loser
- Alt = Alternate
- ITF = ITF entry
- PR = Protected ranking
- SR = Special ranking
- SE = Special exempt
- JE = Junior exempt
- JR = Junior Accelerator Programme entrant
- CO = College Accelerator Programme entrant
- NG = Next Gen Accelerator Program entrant
- w/o = Walkover
- r = Retired
- d = Defaulted

First round
1	(Serbia) I Bozoljac (Sweden) A Siljeström	6	6^{10}	[7]
WC	(Philippines) FC Alcantara (Indonesia) C Rungkat	4	7^{12}	[10]
(China) M Gong (Chinese Taipei) C-h Yi	4	3
PR	(Switzerland) M Chiudinelli (Slovakia) L Lacko	6	6
4	(Thailand) Sa Ratiwatana (Thailand) So Ratiwatana	6	7^{7}
(China) Z Li (Chinese Taipei) H-y Peng	4	6^{3}
(Belgium) K Coppejans (Belgium) Y Mertens	1	6^{5}
(Croatia) D Marcan (Croatia) N Mektić	6	7^{7}
(Austria) M Neuchrist (India) D Sharan	7^{7}	6
(United States) J Cerretani (Japan) T Matsui	6^{5}	2
(France) D Guez (Japan) G Soeda	3	6	[10]
3	(Croatia) A Šančić (Netherlands) M Vervoort	6	1	[8]
WC	(Philippines) R Gonzales (United Kingdom) D Walsh	4	3
(South Africa) D O'Brien (South Africa) R Roelofse	6	6
WC	(Philippines) J Patrombon (Chinese Taipei) J Wang	3	1
2	(Sweden) J Brunström (Denmark) F Nielsen	6	6

Quarterfinals
WC	(Philippines) FC Alcantara (Indonesia) C Rungkat	6	6
PR	(Switzerland) M Chiudinelli (Slovakia) L Lacko	3	2
4	(Thailand) Sa Ratiwatana (Thailand) So Ratiwatana	6	6
(Croatia) D Marcan (Croatia) N Mektić	4	4
(Austria) M Neuchrist (India) D Sharan	6	6
(France) D Guez (Japan) G Soeda	2	4
(South Africa) D O'Brien (South Africa) R Roelofse	5	2
2	(Sweden) J Brunström (Denmark) F Nielsen	7	6

Semifinals
WC	(Philippines) FC Alcantara (Indonesia) C Rungkat	w/o
4	(Thailand) Sa Ratiwatana (Thailand) So Ratiwatana
(Austria) M Neuchrist (India) D Sharan	3	7^{10}	[7]
2	(Sweden) J Brunström (Denmark) F Nielsen	6	6^{8}	[10]

Final
WC	(Philippines) FC Alcantara (Indonesia) C Rungkat	2	2
2	(Sweden) J Brunström (Denmark) F Nielsen	6	6
