= 2016 Manila Challenger =

- Date: 18–24 January
- Edition: 1st
- Draw: 32S / 32Q / 16D
- Prize money: $75,000
- Surface: Hard
- Location: Manila, Philippines
- Venue: Rizal Memorial Tennis Center

Champions

Singles
- (Russia) Mikhail Youzhny

Doubles
- (Sweden) Johan Brunström / (Denmark) Frederik Nielsen
Manila Challenger	· 2017 →

The 2016 Manila Challenger was a professional tennis tournament played on hard courts. It was the first edition of the tournament which was part of the 2016 ATP Challenger Tour. It took place in Manila, Philippines between 18 and 24 January 2016.

== Singles main-draw entrants ==
=== Seeds ===
Country	Player	Rank^{1}	Seed
ITA	Luca Vanni	104	1
RUS	Mikhail Youzhny	106	2
SVK	Lukáš Lacko	112	3
JPN	Go Soeda	118	4
BEL	Kimmer Coppejans	127	5
ITA	Thomas Fabbiano	142	6
NED	Igor Sijsling	145	7
IND	Somdev Devvarman	173	8

- ^{1} Rankings are as of January 11, 2016.

=== Other entrants ===
The following players received wildcards into the singles main draw:

- (Philippines) Francis Casey Alcantara
- (Philippines) Ruben Gonzales
- (Philippines) Alberto Lim Jr.
- (Philippines) Jeson Patrombon

The following player received entry to the main draw as a protected ranking:

- (Switzerland) Marco Chiudinelli

The following players received entry to the main draw as special exempts:

- (Chinese Taipei) Jason Jung
- (Portugal) Frederico Ferreira Silva

The following players received entry from the qualifying draw:

- (Croatia) Nikola Mektić
- (Denmark) Frederik Nielsen
- (India) Vijay Sundar Prashanth
- (Chinese Taipei) Jimmy Wang

== Champions ==
=== Singles ===
- (Russia) Mikhail Youzhny def. (Switzerland) Marco Chiudinelli 6–4, 6–4

=== Doubles ===
- (Sweden) Johan Brunström / (Denmark) Frederik Nielsen def. (Philippines) Francis Casey Alcantara / (Indonesia) Christopher Rungkat 6–2, 6–2
