= 2013 Proton Malaysian Open – Singles =

Singles
- 2013 Proton Malaysian Open

Final
- Champion: (Portugal) João Sousa
- Runner-up: (France) Julien Benneteau
- Score: 2–6, 7–5, 6–4

Details
- Draw: 28
- Seeds: 8

Events
Singles	Doubles
← 2012 ·	Proton Malaysian Open	· 2014 →

João Sousa won the title, defeating Julien Benneteau 2–6, 7–5, 6–4 in the final. He saved a championship point in the second set and became the first player from Portugal to win an ATP title.

Juan Mónaco was the defending champion, but withdrew before the event started.

== Seeds ==
1. (Spain) David Ferrer (quarterfinals)
2. (Switzerland) Stanislas Wawrinka (semifinals)
3. (Spain) Nicolás Almagro (second round)
4. (Austria) Jürgen Melzer (semifinals)
5. (France) Julien Benneteau (final)
6. (Russia) Dmitry Tursunov (quarterfinals)
7. (Canada) Vasek Pospisil (second round)
8. (Russia) Nikolay Davydenko (first round)

== Draw ==
=== Key ===
- Q = Qualifier
- WC = Wild card
- LL = Lucky loser
- Alt = Alternate
- SE = Special exempt
- PR = Protected ranking
- ITF = ITF entry
- JE = Junior exempt
- w/o = Walkover
- r = Retired
- d = Defaulted
- SR = Special ranking

=== Finals ===
Semifinals
SE	(Portugal) João Sousa	6	3	6
4	(Austria) Jürgen Melzer	4	6	4
5	(France) Julien Benneteau	6	6
2	(Switzerland) Stanislas Wawrinka	4	3

Final
SE	(Portugal) João Sousa	2	7	6
5	(France) Julien Benneteau	6	5	4

=== Top half ===
First round
Q	(India) S Devvarman	3	3
Q	(Italy) M Viola	6	6
WC	(United States) R Harrison	3	2
SE	(Portugal) J Sousa	6	6
PR	(Uruguay) P Cuevas	6	6
8	(Russia) N Davydenko	3	4
Q	(Germany) M Zverev	7^{7}	6
(Argentina) H Zeballos	6^{5}	2
WC	(South Korea) H Chung	4	2
(Argentina) F Delbonis	6	6
(Romania) V Hănescu	6	1	3
7	(Canada) V Pospisil	1	6	6

Second round
1	(Spain) D Ferrer	6	6
Q	(Italy) M Viola	2	3
SE	(Portugal) J Sousa	4	7	6
PR	(Uruguay) P Cuevas	6	5	0
4	(Austria) J Melzer	7	6
Q	(Germany) M Zverev	5	4
(Argentina) F Delbonis	7^{7}	7^{7}
7	(Canada) V Pospisil	6^{2}	6^{1}

Quarterfinals
1	(Spain) D Ferrer	2	6^{6}
SE	(Portugal) J Sousa	6	7^{8}
4	(Austria) J Melzer	6	6
(Argentina) F Delbonis	3	2

Semifinals
SE	(Portugal) J Sousa	6	3	6
4	(Austria) J Melzer	4	6	4

=== Bottom half ===
First round
5	(France) J Benneteau	7^{8}	6
SE	(Poland) M Przysiężny	6^{6}	4
(Slovenia) G Žemlja	6	5	0^{r}
(Spain) P Andújar	3	7	0
(Germany) D Brands	3	4
(France) A Mannarino	6	6
6	(Russia) D Tursunov	7	6
Q	(United States) R Ram	5	0
(Russia) A Bogomolov Jr.	6^{5}	0
WC	(Spain) P Carreño-Busta	7^{7}	6
(Cyprus) M Baghdatis	7^{7}	6
(Argentina) C Berlocq	6^{3}	3

Second round
5	(France) J Benneteau	7^{10}	6
(Spain) P Andújar	6^{8}	2
(France) A Mannarino	6	6
3	(Spain) N Almagro	4	3
6	(Russia) D Tursunov	6	6
WC	(Spain) P Carreño-Busta	2	4
(Cyprus) M Baghdatis	1	5
2	(Switzerland) S Wawrinka	6	7

Quarterfinals
5	(France) J Benneteau	6	6
(France) A Mannarino	3	3
6	(Russia) D Tursunov	6	3	6^{3}
2	(Switzerland) S Wawrinka	2	6	7^{7}

Semifinals
5	(France) J Benneteau	6	6
2	(Switzerland) S Wawrinka	4	3

== Qualifying ==
=== Seeds ===
1. (United States) Michael Russell (qualifying competition, retired)
2. (India) Somdev Devvarman (qualified)
3. (United States) Rajeev Ram (qualified)
4. (Italy) Matteo Viola (qualified)
5. (Germany) Mischa Zverev (qualified)
6. (Japan) Tatsuma Ito (qualifying competition)
7. (South Africa) Rik de Voest (second round)
8. (China) Zhang Ze (second round)

=== Qualifiers ===
1. (Germany) Mischa Zverev
2. (India) Somdev Devvarman
3. (United States) Rajeev Ram
4. (Italy) Matteo Viola

=== Qualifying draw ===
==== First qualifier ====
First round
(Australia) Greg Jones	6	6
(Hong Kong) Kevin Kung	0	3
(Japan) Toshihide Matsui	2^{r}
(Philippines) Treat Huey	4
WC	(Malaysia) Abdul Hazli Zainuddin	1	0
5	(Germany) Mischa Zverev	6	6

Second round
1	(United States) Michael Russell	6	2	6
(Australia) Greg Jones	3	6	4
(Philippines) Treat Huey	5	2
5	(Germany) Mischa Zverev	7	6

Qualifying competition
1	(United States) Michael Russell	3	0^{r}
5	(Germany) Mischa Zverev	6	3

==== Second qualifier ====
First round
(United States) Eric Butorac	6	2	6
WC	(Malaysia) Mohd Assri Merzuki	4	6	2
(Netherlands) Jean-Julien Rojer	6	6
WC	(Malaysia) Si Yew Ming	0	4
(Japan) Bumpei Sato	2	2
8	(China) Zhang Ze	6	6

Second round
2	(India) Somdev Devvarman	6	6
(United States) Eric Butorac	1	3
(Netherlands) Jean-Julien Rojer	6	7^{7}
8	(China) Zhang Ze	4	6^{5}

Qualifying competition
2	(India) Somdev Devvarman	7	7
(Netherlands) Jean-Julien Rojer	5	5

==== Third qualifier ====
First round
(South Korea) Nam Ji-sung	6	6
(Mexico) Santiago González	4	2
(New Zealand) Jose Statham	6	6
(Malaysia) Ahmed Deedat Abdul Razak	2	2
WC	(Malaysia) Syed Mohd Agil Syed Naguib	0	1
6	(Japan) Tatsuma Ito	6	6

Second round
3	(United States) Rajeev Ram	6	7^{7}
(South Korea) Nam Ji-sung	3	6^{5}
(New Zealand) Jose Statham	6	4	3
6	(Japan) Tatsuma Ito	1	6	6

Qualifying competition
3	(United States) Rajeev Ram	7^{7}	5	6
6	(Japan) Tatsuma Ito	6^{2}	7	3

==== Fourth qualifier ====
First round
WC	(Malaysia) Ashaari Zainal	6	6
(Italy) Enrico Becuzzi	0	2
(Japan) Yasutaka Uchiyama	6	7^{7}
(Serbia) Nenad Zimonjić	1	6^{4}
(Indonesia) Christopher Rungkat	4	1
7	(South Africa) Rik de Voest	6	6

Second round
4	(Italy) Matteo Viola	6	6
WC	(Malaysia) Ashaari Zainal	0	1
(Japan) Yasutaka Uchiyama	6	3	6
7	(South Africa) Rik de Voest	4	6	4

Qualifying competition
4	(Italy) Matteo Viola	6	7
(Japan) Yasutaka Uchiyama	1	5
