= Tennis at the 2015 SEA Games – Women's team =

Women's team
- Tennis at the 2015 SEA Games

Final
- Champion: Thailand (THA)
- Runner-up: Philippines (PHI)
- Score: 2–1

Events
Singles	men	women
Doubles	men	women	mixed
Team	men	women
- SEA Games

Thailand were the defending champions having won the event in 2011 and they successfully defended their title, defeating Philippines in the final, 2–1.

== Medalists ==
Event	Gold	Silver	Bronze
Women's Team	Thailand Luksika Kumkhum; Noppawan Lertcheewakarn; Tamarine Tanasugarn; Varatchaya Wongteanchai	Philippines Denise Dy; Khim Iglupas; Katharina Lehnert; Anna Clarice Patrimonio	Malaysia Jawairiah Noordin; Theiviya Selvarajoo; Yus Syazlin Yusri
Women's Team	Thailand Luksika Kumkhum; Noppawan Lertcheewakarn; Tamarine Tanasugarn; Varatchaya Wongteanchai	Philippines Denise Dy; Khim Iglupas; Katharina Lehnert; Anna Clarice Patrimonio	Indonesia Jessy Rompies; Lavinia Tananta; Ayu Fani Damayanti; Aldila Sutjiadi

== Draw ==
Quarterfinals; 6 June / 7 June
1	Thailand	3
Singapore	0
Myanmar	1
Malaysia	2
Cambodia	1
3	Indonesia	2
Vietnam	1
2	Philippines	2

Semifinals; 8 June
1	Thailand	3
Malaysia	0
3	Indonesia	1
2	Philippines	2

Final; 9 June
1	Thailand	2
2	Philippines	1

== First round ==
6 June	Thailand	3–0	Singapore

Varatchaya Wongteanchai	2–0	Wee Khee-yen	6–4, 6–1
Luksika Kumkhum	2–0	Li Yun Stefanie Tan	6–4, 6–2
Noppawan Lertcheewakarn / Tamarine Tanasugarn	2–0	Li Yun Stefanie Tan / Wee Khee-yen	7–6, 6–1

6 June	Myanmar	1–2	Malaysia

Amy Tun	0–2	Jawairiah Noordin	2–6, 0–6
Nilar Win	2–0	Theiviya Selvarajoo	6–4, 6–2
Thandar Aung / Amy Tun	0–2	Jawairiah Noordin / Yus Syazlin Yusri	3–6, 6–7

7 June	Cambodia	1–2	Indonesia

Som Chenda	0–2	Jessy Rompies	0–6, 0–6
Ka Andrea Daravy	2–1	Lavinia Tananta	4–6, 6–1, 6–4
Ka Andrea Daravy / Som Chenda	0–2	Ayu Fani Damayanti / Aldila Sutjiadi	4–6, 0–6

7 June	Vietnam	1–2	Philippines

Sĩ Bội Ngọc	2–1	Anna Clarice Patrimonio	6–3, 2–6, 6–4
Trần Thị Tâm	0–2	Katharina Lehnert	2–6, 1–6
Sĩ Bội Ngọc / Trần Thị Tâm	0–2	Denise Dy / Katharina Lehnert	0–6, 3–6

== Semifinals ==
8 June	Thailand	3–0	Malaysia

Noppawan Lertcheewakarn	2–0	Jawairiah Noordin	6–3, 6–4
Varatchaya Wongteanchai	2–0	Theiviya Selvarajoo	6–2, 6–0
Luksika Kumkhum / Tamarine Tanasugarn	0–0	Jawairiah Noordin / Yus Syazlin Yusri	Walkover

8 June	Indonesia	1–2	Philippines

Jessy Rompies	2–0	Anna Clarice Patrimonio	6–1, 6–2
Lavinia Tananta	1–2	Katharina Lehnert	2–6, 6–4, 3–6
Ayu Fani Damayanti / Aldila Sutjiadi	0–2	Denise Dy / Katharina Lehnert	4–6, 6–7

== Final ==
9 June	Thailand	2–1	Philippines

Varatchaya Wongteanchai	2–0	Khim Iglupas	6–2, 6–2
Luksika Kumkhum	1–2	Katharina Lehnert	6–2, 5–7, 6–7
Noppawan Lertcheewakarn / Tamarine Tanasugarn	2–0	Denise Dy / Katharina Lehnert	6–0, 6–2
