= Tennis at the 2015 SEA Games – Women's singles =

Women's singles
- Tennis at the 2015 SEA Games

Final
- Champion: Noppawan Lertcheewakarn (THA)
- Runner-up: Varatchaya Wongteanchai (THA)
- Score: 3–6, 6–0, 6–4

Events
Singles	men	women
Doubles	men	women	mixed
Team	men	women
- SEA Games

Ayu Fani Damayanti was the defending champions having won the event in 2011, but decided not to participate in the singles event.

Noppawan Lertcheewakarn won the gold medal, defeating Varatchaya Wongteanchai in the final, 3–6, 6–0, 6–4. Katharina Lehnert and Lavinia Tananta won the bronze medals.

== Medalists ==
Event	Gold	Silver	Bronze
Women's Singles	Noppawan Lertcheewakarn (THA)	Varatchaya Wongteanchai (THA)	Katharina Lehnert (PHI)
Women's Singles	Noppawan Lertcheewakarn (THA)	Varatchaya Wongteanchai (THA)	Lavinia Tananta (INA)

== Seeds ==
1. Varatchaya Wongteanchai (THA) (final; Silver medallist)
2. Noppawan Lertcheewakarn (THA) (champion; Gold medallist)
3. Katharina Lehnert (PHI) (semifinals; Bronze medallist)
4. Lavinia Tananta (INA) (semifinals; Bronze medallist)

== Draw ==
Key

- Q = Qualifier
- WC = Wild card
- LL = Lucky loser
- Alt = Alternate
- ITF = ITF entry
- PR = Protected ranking
- SR = Special ranking
- SE = Special exempt
- JE = Junior exempt
- JR = Junior Accelerator Programme entrant
- CO = College Accelerator Programme entrant
- NG = Next Gen Accelerator Program entrant
- w/o = Walkover
- r = Retired
- d = Defaulted

=== Finals ===
Semifinals
1	Varatchaya Wongteanchai (THA)	7	6
3	Katharina Lehnert (PHI)	5	1
4	Lavinia Tananta (INA)	0	3
2	Noppawan Lertcheewakarn (THA)	6	6

Final
1	Varatchaya Wongteanchai (THA)	6	0	4
2	Noppawan Lertcheewakarn (THA)	3	6	6

=== Top half ===
First round
T Selvarajoo (MAS)	2	2
A Sutjiadi (INA)	6	6

Second round
1	Vara Wongteanchai (THA)	5	6	6
A Sutjiadi (INA)	7	3	0
T Aung (MYA)	0	1
MT Đào (VIE)	6	6
3	K Lehnert (PHI)	6	7
S Tan (SIN)	0	5
P Philavong (LAO)	3	6	6
C Som (CAM)	6	4	4

Quarterfinals
1	Vara Wongteanchai (THA)	6	6
MT Đào (VIE)	0	0
3	K Lehnert (PHI)	6	6
P Philavong (LAO)	1	0

Semifinals
1	Vara Wongteanchai (THA)	7	6
3	K Lehnert (PHI)	5	1

=== Bottom half ===
First round

Second round
AD Ka (CAM)	6	6
K-y Wee (SIN)	1	2
J Noordin (MAS)	3	3
4	L Tananta (INA)	6	6
N Win (MYA)	1	3
AC Patrimonio (PHI)	6	6
BN Sĩ (VIE)	2	2
2	N Lertcheewakarn (THA)	6	6

Quarterfinals
AD Ka (CAM)	2	0
4	L Tananta (INA)	6	6
AC Patrimonio (PHI)	3	2
2	N Lertcheewakarn (THA)	6	6

Semifinals
4	L Tananta (INA)	0	3
2	N Lertcheewakarn (THA)	6	6
