= 2012 Proton Malaysian Open – Doubles =

Doubles
- 2012 Proton Malaysian Open

Final
- Champions: (Austria) Alexander Peya (Brazil) Bruno Soares
- Runners-up: (United Kingdom) Colin Fleming (United Kingdom) Ross Hutchins
- Score: 5–7, 7–5, [10–7]

Events
| Singles | Doubles |
- Proton Malaysian Open

Eric Butorac and Jean-Julien Rojer were the defending champions but both decided to participate at the 2012 PTT Thailand Open instead.
Alexander Peya and Bruno Soares prevailed in the final against Colin Fleming and Ross Hutchins, 5–7, 7–5, [10–7].

== Seeds ==
1. (Poland) Mariusz Fyrstenberg / (Poland) Marcin Matkowski (semifinals)
2. (Italy) Daniele Bracciali / (Brazil) Marcelo Melo (semifinals)
3. (Austria) Alexander Peya / (Brazil) Bruno Soares (champions)
4. (Austria) Julian Knowle / (Slovakia) Filip Polášek (quarterfinals)

== Draw ==
Key

- Q = Qualifier
- WC = Wild card
- LL = Lucky loser
- Alt = Alternate
- ITF = ITF entry
- PR = Protected ranking
- SR = Special ranking
- SE = Special exempt
- JE = Junior exempt
- JR = Junior Accelerator Programme entrant
- CO = College Accelerator Programme entrant
- NG = Next Gen Accelerator Program entrant
- w/o = Walkover
- r = Retired
- d = Defaulted

=== Draw ===
First round
1 | (Poland) M Fyrstenberg (Poland) M Matkowski | 6 | 6
WC | (Malaysia) MA Merzuki (Malaysia) SMA Syed Naguib | 1 | 3
Alt | (Canada) V Pospisil (India) S Singh | 6 | 6
(United States) J Cerretani (Australia) M Ebden | 4 | 4
4 | (Austria) J Knowle (Slovakia) F Polášek | w/o
(Slovakia) M Kližan (Spain) A Ramos
(Colombia) A Falla (Netherlands) I Sijsling | 3 | 2
(United Kingdom) C Fleming (United Kingdom) R Hutchins | 6 | 6
(Russia) N Davydenko (Belgium) D Norman | 6 | 6
(Russia) M Elgin (Uzbekistan) D Istomin | 3 | 0
WC | (Malaysia) YM Si (Chinese Taipei) J Wang | 2 | 2
3 | (Austria) A Peya (Brazil) B Soares | 6 | 6
(Germany) M Kohlmann (Germany) F Moser | 5 | 6 | [11]
(Philippines) TC Huey (United Kingdom) D Inglot | 7 | 3 | [9]
(United States) B Baker (United States) R Ram | 4 | 3
2 | (Italy) D Bracciali (Brazil) M Melo | 6 | 6

Quarterfinals
1 | (Poland) M Fyrstenberg (Poland) M Matkowski | 4 | 6 | [10]
Alt | (Canada) V Pospisil (India) S Singh | 6 | 3 | [5]
4 | (Austria) J Knowle (Slovakia) F Polášek | 3 | 6 | [4]
(United Kingdom) C Fleming (United Kingdom) R Hutchins | 6 | 2 | [10]
(Russia) N Davydenko (Belgium) D Norman | 3 | 3
3 | (Austria) A Peya (Brazil) B Soares | 6 | 6
(Germany) M Kohlmann (Germany) F Moser | 6^{3} | 4
2 | (Italy) D Bracciali (Brazil) M Melo | 7^{7} | 6

Semifinals
1 | (Poland) M Fyrstenberg (Poland) M Matkowski | 3 | 6^{3}
(United Kingdom) C Fleming (United Kingdom) R Hutchins | 6 | 7^{7}
3 | (Austria) A Peya (Brazil) B Soares | 7^{8} | 6
2 | (Italy) D Bracciali (Brazil) M Melo | 6^{6} | 1

Final
(United Kingdom) C Fleming (United Kingdom) R Hutchins | 7 | 5 | [7]
3 | (Austria) A Peya (Brazil) B Soares | 5 | 7 | [10]
