= Tennis at the 2015 SEA Games – Women's doubles =

Women's doubles
- Tennis at the 2015 SEA Games

Final
- Champion: Noppawan Lertcheewakarn (THA); Varatchaya Wongteanchai (THA)
- Runner-up: Denise Dy (PHI); Katharina Lehnert (PHI)
- Score: 6–3, 6–4

Events
Singles	men	women
Doubles	men	women	mixed
Team	men	women
- SEA Games

Noppawan Lertcheewakarn and Nungnadda Wannasuk were the defending champions, but Wannasuk was not selected for the Thai team. Lertcheewakarn partnered Varatchaya Wongteanchai.

Lertcheewakarn and Wongteanchai won the gold medal, defeating Denise Dy and Katharina Lehnert in the final, 6–3, 6–4. Peangtarn Plipuech and Tamarine Tanasugarn, and Jessy Rompies and Aldila Sutjiadi won the bronze medals.

== Medalists ==
Event	Gold	Silver	Bronze
Women's Doubles	Noppawan Lertcheewakarn (THA); Varatchaya Wongteanchai (THA)	Denise Dy (PHI); Katharina Lehnert (PHI)	Peangtarn Plipuech (THA); Tamarine Tanasugarn (THA)
Women's Doubles	Noppawan Lertcheewakarn (THA); Varatchaya Wongteanchai (THA)	Denise Dy (PHI); Katharina Lehnert (PHI)	Jessy Rompies (INA); Aldila Sutjiadi (INA)

== Seeds ==
1. Peangtarn Plipuech (THA) / Tamarine Tanasugarn (THA) (semifinals; Bronze medallists)
2. Noppawan Lertcheewakarn (THA) / Varatchaya Wongteanchai (THA) (champions; Gold medallists)
3. Jessy Rompies (INA) / Aldila Sutjiadi (INA) (semifinals; Bronze medallists)
4. Denise Dy (PHI) / Katharina Lehnert (PHI) (final; Silver medallists)

== Draw ==
Key

- Q = Qualifier
- WC = Wild card
- LL = Lucky loser
- Alt = Alternate
- ITF = ITF entry
- PR = Protected ranking
- SR = Special ranking
- SE = Special exempt
- JE = Junior exempt
- JR = Junior Accelerator Programme entrant
- CO = College Accelerator Programme entrant
- NG = Next Gen Accelerator Program entrant
- w/o = Walkover
- r = Retired
- d = Defaulted

First round
YT Lwin (MYA); A Tun (MYA)	2	2
MT Đào (VIE); TT Phan (VIE)	6	6
AF Damayanti (INA); L Tananta (INA)	6	6
D Nilaxay (LAO); P Philavong (LAO)	0	0
S Tan (SIN); K-y Wee (SIN)	4	5
4	D Dy (PHI); K Lehnert (PHI)	6	7
3	J Rompies (INA); A Sutjiadi (INA)	6	6
T Aung (MYA); N Win (MYA)	1	1
A Devanthiran (SIN); S Peng (SIN)	4	0
BN Sĩ (VIE); TT Trần (VIE)	6	6
T Selvarajoo (MAS); YS Yusri (MAS)	6	3	[11]
K Iglupas (PHI); AC Patrimonio (PHI)	4	6	[9]

Quarterfinals
1	Pe Plipuech (THA); T Tanasugarn (THA)	6	6
MT Đào (VIE); TT Phan (VIE)	2	0
AF Damayanti (INA); L Tananta (INA)	4	4
4	D Dy (PHI); K Lehnert (PHI)	6	6
3	J Rompies (INA); A Sutjiadi (INA)	6	6
BN Sĩ (VIE); TT Trần (VIE)	3	3
T Selvarajoo (MAS); YS Yusri (MAS)	2	2
2	N Lertcheewakarn (THA); Vara Wongteanchai (THA)	6	6

Semifinals
1	Pe Plipuech (THA); T Tanasugarn (THA)	6	2	[8]
4	D Dy (PHI); K Lehnert (PHI)	1	6	[10]
3	J Rompies (INA); A Sutjiadi (INA)	2	3
2	N Lertcheewakarn (THA); Vara Wongteanchai (THA)	6	6

Final
4	D Dy (PHI); K Lehnert (PHI)	3	4
2	N Lertcheewakarn (THA); Vara Wongteanchai (THA)	6	6
