= Tennis at the 2015 SEA Games =

- Venue: Kallang Tennis Centre
- Dates: 6 June 2015 to 14 June 2015
- Competitors: 68 from 9 nations

Tennis at the 2015 SEA Games was held in Kallang Tennis Centre, in Kallang, Singapore from 6 to 14 June 2015.

== Participating nations ==
A total of 68 athletes from nine nations is being competing in tennis at the 2015 Southeast Asian Games:

- Cambodia (6)
- Indonesia (8)
- Laos (5)
- Malaysia (7)
- Myanmar (8)
- Philippines (8)
- Singapore (8)
- Thailand (9)
- Vietnam (9)

== Medalists ==
Event	Gold	Silver	Bronze
Men's singles	Warit Sornbutnark; Thailand	David Susanto; Indonesia	Jeson Patrombon; Philippines
Men's singles	Warit Sornbutnark; Thailand	David Susanto; Indonesia	Bun Kenny; Cambodia
Women's singles	Noppawan Lertcheewakarn; Thailand	Varatchaya Wongteanchai; Thailand	Katharina Lehnert; Philippines
Women's singles	Noppawan Lertcheewakarn; Thailand	Varatchaya Wongteanchai; Thailand	Lavinia Tananta; Indonesia
Men's doubles	Thailand; Sanchai Ratiwatana; Sonchat Ratiwatana	Philippines; Ruben Gonzales; Jeson Patrombon	Philippines; Francis Alcantara; Treat Huey
Men's doubles	Thailand; Sanchai Ratiwatana; Sonchat Ratiwatana	Philippines; Ruben Gonzales; Jeson Patrombon	Thailand; Warit Sornbutnark; Kittipong Wachiramanowong
Women's doubles	Thailand; Noppawan Lertcheewakarn; Varatchaya Wongteanchai	Philippines; Denise Dy; Katharina Lehnert	Thailand; Peangtarn Plipuech; Tamarine Tanasugarn
Women's doubles	Thailand; Noppawan Lertcheewakarn; Varatchaya Wongteanchai	Philippines; Denise Dy; Katharina Lehnert	Indonesia; Jessy Rompies; Aldila Sutjiadi
Mixed doubles	Philippines; Denise Dy; Treat Huey	Thailand; Peangtarn Plipuech; Sonchat Ratiwatana	Indonesia; Jessy Rompies; Sunu Wahyu Trijati
Mixed doubles	Philippines; Denise Dy; Treat Huey	Thailand; Peangtarn Plipuech; Sonchat Ratiwatana	Thailand; Tamarine Tanasugarn; Sanchai Ratiwatana
Men's team	Thailand; Sanchai Ratiwatana; Sonchat Ratiwatana; Danai Udomchoke; Kittipong Wachiramanowong	Indonesia; Christopher Rungkat; Aditya Sasongko; David Susanto; Sunu Wahyu Trijati	Malaysia; Ariez Deen Heshaam; Mohd Assri Merzuki; Syed Syed Naguib; Muhammad Zainal Abidin
Men's team	Thailand; Sanchai Ratiwatana; Sonchat Ratiwatana; Danai Udomchoke; Kittipong Wachiramanowong	Indonesia; Christopher Rungkat; Aditya Sasongko; David Susanto; Sunu Wahyu Trijati	Philippines; Francis Alcantara; Ruben Gonzales; Treat Huey; Jeson Patrombon
Women's team	Thailand; Luksika Kumkhum; Noppawan Lertcheewakarn; Tamarine Tanasugarn; Varatchaya Wongteanchai	Philippines; Denise Dy; Khim Iglupas; Katharina Lehnert; Anna Clarice Patrimonio	Malaysia; Jawairiah Noordin; Theiviya Selvarajoo; Yus Syazlin Yusri
Women's team	Thailand; Luksika Kumkhum; Noppawan Lertcheewakarn; Tamarine Tanasugarn; Varatchaya Wongteanchai	Philippines; Denise Dy; Khim Iglupas; Katharina Lehnert; Anna Clarice Patrimonio	Indonesia; Jessy Rompies; Lavinia Tananta; Ayu Fani Damayanti; Aldila Sutjiadi

== Medal table ==
* Host nation (Singapore)

Rank	Nation	Gold	Silver	Bronze	Total
1	Thailand	6	2	3	11
2	Philippines	1	3	4	8
3	Indonesia	0	2	4	6
4	Malaysia	0	0	2	2
5	Cambodia	0	0	1	1
6	Laos	0	0	0	0
6	Myanmar	0	0	0	0
6	Singapore*	0	0	0	0
6	Vietnam	0	0	0	0
Totals (9 entries)		7	7	14	28
