= 2013 Proton Malaysian Open =

Tennis tournament

- Date: 23–29 September
- Edition: 5th
- Category: World Tour 250 series
- Draw: 28S / 16D
- Prize money: $857,500
- Surface: Hard
- Location: Kuala Lumpur, Malaysia

Champions

Singles
- (Portugal) João Sousa

Doubles
- (United States) Eric Butorac / (South Africa) Raven Klaasen
- Proton Malaysian Open

The 2013 Proton Malaysian Open was a professional tennis tournament played on hard courts. It was the fifth edition of the tournament, and part of the 2013 ATP World Tour. It took place in Kuala Lumpur, Malaysia between 23 and 29 September 2013.

== Singles main-draw entrants ==
=== Seeds ===
Country	Player	Rank*	Seed
ESP	David Ferrer	4	1
SUI	Stanislas Wawrinka	10	2
ESP	Nicolás Almagro	18	3
AUT	Jürgen Melzer	27	4
FRA	Julien Benneteau	33	5
RUS	Dmitry Tursunov	34	6
CAN	Vasek Pospisil	41	7
RUS	Nikolay Davydenko	43	8

- Rankings are as of 16 September 2013

=== Other entrants ===
The following players received wildcards into the singles main draw:

- (Spain) Pablo Carreño Busta
- (South Korea) Chung Hyeon
- (United States) Ryan Harrison

The following players received entry from the qualifying draw:

- (India) Somdev Devvarman
- (United States) Rajeev Ram
- (Italy) Matteo Viola
- (Germany) Mischa Zverev

=== Withdrawals ===
Before the tournament

- (United States) Brian Baker
- (Croatia) Marin Čilić (suspension)
- (Argentina) Juan Mónaco
- (Italy) Andreas Seppi

=== Retirements ===
- (Slovenia) Grega Žemlja (illness)

== Doubles main-draw entrants ==
=== Seeds ===
Country	Player	Country	Player	Rank^{1}	Seed
PAK	Aisam-ul-Haq Qureshi	NED	Jean-Julien Rojer	29	1
FRA	Julien Benneteau	SRB	Nenad Zimonjić	35	2
MEX	Santiago González	USA	Scott Lipsky	60	3
PHI	Treat Huey	GBR	Dominic Inglot	61	4

- Rankings are as of 16 September 2013

=== Other entrants ===
The following pairs received wildcards into the doubles main draw:

- (India) Yuki Bhambri / (Malaysia) Syed Mohd Agil Syed Naguib
- (Spain) Pablo Carreño Busta / (Malaysia) Mohd Assri Merzuki

The following pairs received entry as alternates:

- (France) Adrian Mannarino / (United States) Michael Russell
- (South Africa) Rik de Voest / (India) Somdev Devvarman

=== Withdrawals ===
Before the tournament

- (Russia) Nikolay Davydenko (wrist injury)
- (Germany) Martin Emmrich (ankle injury)

== Finals ==
=== Singles ===
- (Portugal) João Sousa defeated (France) Julien Benneteau 2–6, 7–5, 6–4

=== Doubles ===
- (United States) Eric Butorac / (South Africa) Raven Klaasen defeated (Uruguay) Pablo Cuevas / (Argentina) Horacio Zeballos 6–2, 6–4
