= Justin Barki =

Indonesian tennis player (born 2000)

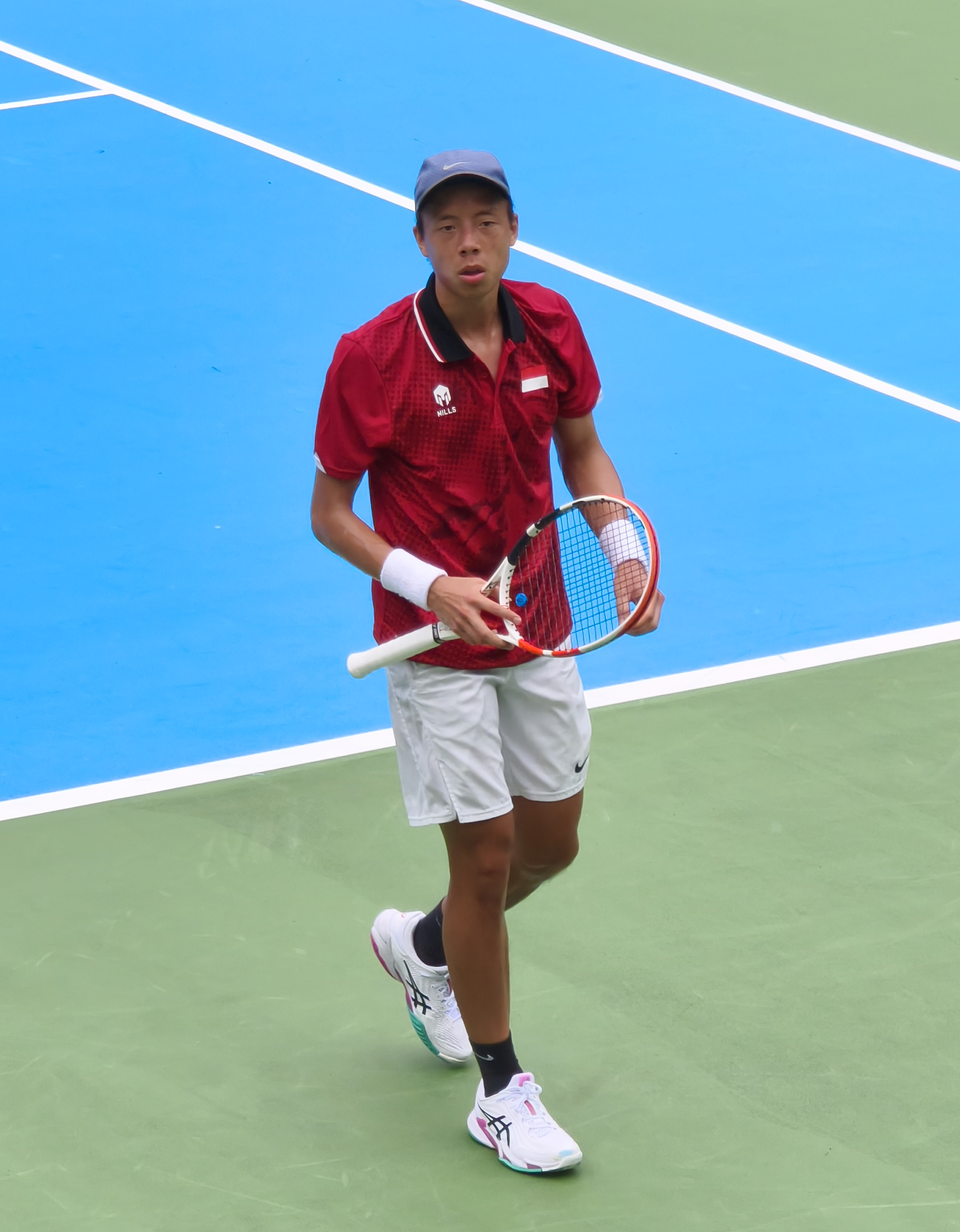
- Full name: Justin Barki
- Country (sports): Indonesia
- Born: 26 May 2000 (age 26) Singapore
- Height: 1.78 m (5 ft 10 in)
- Plays: Right-Handed
- College: Princeton
- Prize money: US $24,283

Singles
- Career record: 1–1 (at ATP Tour level, Grand Slam level, and in Davis Cup)
- Career titles: 0
- Highest ranking: No. 657 (29 October 2023)
- Current ranking: No. 1,604 (3 August 2026)

Doubles
- Career record: 1–2 (at ATP Tour level, Grand Slam level, and in Davis Cup)
- Career titles: 9 ITF
- Highest ranking: No. 403 (11 December 2017)

Team competitions
- Davis Cup: 2–3
Medal record
Men's Tennis
Representing Indonesia
SEA Games
Gold medal – first place	2025 Thailand	Team
- Last updated on: 3 August 2026.

Justin Barki (born 26 May 2000) is an Indonesian tennis player. Barki has a career high ATP singles ranking of No. 657 achieved on 29 October 2023 and a career high ATP doubles ranking of No. 403 achieved on 11 December 2017. Barki has won 9 ITF Futures doubles titles.

Barki has represented Indonesia at the Davis Cup.

== Personal life ==
Barki is the cousin of racing driver Sean Gelael. He is the grandson of coal tycoon Kiki Barki, and the late Dick Gelael, the founder of Gelael Supermarket and Multi Food Indonesia.

== ATP Challenger and ITF Futures/World Tennis Tour finals ==
=== Singles: 2 (1 title, 1 runner-up) ===
Legend ATP Challenger Tour (0–0) ITF World Tennis Tour (1–1)	Finals by surface Hard (1–1) Clay (0–0) Grass (0–0) Carpet (0–0)

Result	W–L	Date	Tournament	Tier	Surface	Opponent	Score
Loss	0–1	Jun 2023	M15 Jakarta, Indonesia	World Tennis Tour	Hard	(Australia) Omar Jasika	2–6, 3–6
Win	1–1	Sep 2023	M25 Hong Kong	World Tennis Tour	Hard	(South Korea) Shin San-hui	4–6, 6–4, ret

=== Doubles: 11 (9 titles, 2 runner-ups) ===
Legend (doubles) ATP Challenger Tour (0–0) ITF Futures Tour/World Tennis Tour (9–2)	Titles by surface Hard (9–2) Clay (0–0) Grass (0–0) Carpet (0–0)

Result	W–L	Date	Tournament	Tier	Surface	Partner	Opponents	Score
Win	1–0	Dec 2016	Indonesia F6, Jakarta	Futures	Hard	(Indonesia) Christopher Rungkat	(Poland) Karol Drzewiecki (Poland) Maciej Smoła	6–4, 6–4
Win	2–0	Feb 2017	Indonesia F3, Jakarta	Futures	Hard	(Indonesia) Christopher Rungkat	(Japan) Sho Katayama (Japan) Sho Shimabukuro	6–3, 6–2
Win	3–0	Mar 2017	Indonesia F4, Jakarta	Futures	Hard	(Indonesia) Christopher Rungkat	(Germany) Pirmin Haenle (India) Karunuday Singh	6–3, 7–6^{(7–1)}
Loss	3–1	Apr 2017	Indonesia F6, Jakarta	Futures	Hard	(Indonesia) Christopher Rungkat	(Japan) Soichiro Moritani (Japan) Kento Takeuchi	4–6, 6–3, [9–11]
Win	4–1	Nov 2017	Indonesia F7, Jakarta	Futures	Hard	(Indonesia) Christopher Rungkat	(Japan) Shintaro Imai (Japan) Renta Tokuda	6–3, 1–6, [11–9]
Win	5–1	Dec 2017	Indonesia F8, Jakarta	Futures	Hard	(India) Vijay Sundar Prashanth	(Japan) Sora Fukuda (Australia) Scott Puodziunas	4–6, 7–6^{(7–5)}, [10–4]
Loss	5–2	Jul 2018	Indonesia F1, Jakarta	Futures	Hard	(Indonesia) Christopher Rungkat	(Australia) Michael Look (Australia) Matthew Romios	6–7^{(6–8)}, 6–7^{(5–7)}
Win	6–2	Aug 2018	Indonesia F3, Jakarta	Futures	Hard	(Indonesia) Christopher Rungkat	(Philippines) Francis Alcantara (Japan) Kaito Uesugi	6–3, 6–2
Win	7–2	Aug 2019	M15 Jakarta, Indonesia	World Tennis Tour	Hard	(South Africa) Ruan Roelofse	(Japan) Sho Shimabukuro (Japan) Hiroyasu Ehara	7–6^{(7–3)}, 6–4
Win	8–2	Apr 2023	M15 Singapore	World Tennis Tour	Hard	(Netherlands) Igor Sijsling	(Philippines) Francis Alcantara (China) Sun Fajing	6–1, 6–1
Win	9–2	Jun 2023	M15 Jakarta, Indonesia	World Tennis Tour	Hard	(Netherlands) Thiemo de Bakker	(India) Siddhant Banthia (India) Nitin Kumar Sinha	6–4, 6–3

== See also ==
- List of Indonesia Davis Cup team representatives
