= Warit Sornbutnark =

Thai tennis player

Warit Sornbutnark วริศ สอนบุตรนาค
- Country (sports): Thailand
- Residence: Bangkok, Thailand
- Born: 27 February 1993 (age 32); Bangkok, Thailand
- Plays: Right-handed (two handed-backhand)
- Prize money: $12,192

Singles
- Career record: 2–3 (at ATP Tour level, Grand Slam level, and in Davis Cup)
- Career titles: 0
- Highest ranking: No. 937 (29 June 2015)
- Current ranking: No. 1101 (14 September 2015)

Doubles
- Career record: 0–0 (at ATP Tour level, Grand Slam level, and in Davis Cup)
- Career titles: 0
- Highest ranking: No. 753 (16 June 2014)
- Current ranking: No. 1095 (14 September 2015)

Team competitions
- Davis Cup: 2–3
Medal record
Men's Tennis
Representing Thailand
Southeast Asian Games
Gold medal – first place	2015 Singapore	Singles
Bronze medal – third place	2015 Singapore	Doubles
- Last updated on: 14 September 2015.

Warit Sornbutnark (Thai: วริศ สอนบุตรนาค; born 27 February 1993) is a Thai tennis player.

Sornbutnark has a career high ATP singles ranking of 937 achieved on 29 June 2015. He also has a career high ATP doubles ranking of 753 achieved on 16 June 2014.

Sornbutnark has represented Thailand at the Davis Cup where he has a W/L record of 2–3.
