= David Agung Susanto =

Indonesian tennis player

- Country (sports): Indonesia
- Residence: Jakarta, Indonesia
- Born: 21 July 1991 (age 34) Jakarta
- Plays: Right-handed (one-handed backhand)
- Prize money: $28,738

Singles
- Career record: 7–12 (at ATP Tour level, Grand Slam level, and in Davis Cup)
- Career titles: 0
- Highest ranking: No. 732 (3 April 2017)

Doubles
- Career record: 4–7 (at ATP Tour level, Grand Slam level, and in Davis Cup)
- Career titles: 4 ITF
- Highest ranking: No. 642 (17 July 2017)

Team competitions
- Davis Cup: 11–22
Medal record
Tennis
Representing Indonesia
Islamic Solidarity Games
Gold medal – first place	2013 Palembang	Team
Silver medal – second place	2013 Palembang	Doubles
Southeast Asian Games
Gold medal – first place	2011 Jakarta-Palembang	Team
Silver medal – second place	2015 Singapore	Singles
Silver medal – second place	2015 Singapore	Team
Bronze medal – third place	2019 Philippines	Mixed doubles
Bronze medal – third place	2023 Phnom Penh	Team
Bronze medal – third place	2023 Phnom Penh	Mixed doubles

David Agung Susanto (born 21 July 1991) is an Indonesian tennis player.

Susanto has a career-high singles ranking of No. 732 by the ATP achieved on 3 April 2017 and a career-high ATP doubles ranking of No. 642 achieved on 17 July 2017. He has won five ITF Futures doubles titles.

Susanto has represented Indonesia in the Davis Cup, where he has a win–loss record of 11–22 (as of March 2024).

== ITF Futures finals ==
=== Singles (0–1) ===
Legend
Challengers
Futures (0–1)

Result	Date	Tournament	Surface	Opponent	Score
Loss	30 April 2016	Chandigarh, India F1	Hard	(India) Vishnu Vardhan	3–6, 6–3, 1–6

=== Doubles (5–7) ===
Legend
Challengers
Futures (5–7)

Result	No.	Date	Tournament	Surface	Partner	Opponent	Score
Loss	1.	11 June 2011	Jakarta, Indonesia F3	Hard	(Indonesia) Sunu Wahyu Trijati	(Thailand) Weerapat Doakmaiklee (Indonesia) Christopher Rungkat	5–7, 0–6
Loss	2.	26 May 2012	Bangkok, Thailand F3	Hard	(Indonesia) Christopher Rungkat	(Chinese Taipei) Lee Hsin-han (Chinese Taipei) Peng Hsien-yin	6–7^{(3–7)}, 3–6
Loss	3.	31 May 2013	Bangkok, Thailand F2	Hard	(Indonesia) Elbert Sie	(Australia) Ryan Agar (Australia) Adam Feeney	6–2, 2–6, [2–10]
Win	1.	21 November 2014	Bangkok, Thailand F8	Hard	(Indonesia) Christopher Rungkat	(Thailand) Dane Chuntaruk (Thailand) Pruchya Isaro	6–3, 6–3
Win	2.	4 July 2014	Phnom Penh, Cambodia F1	Hard	(Philippines) Jeson Patrombon	(Cambodia) Kenny Bun (Canada) Kelsey Stevenson	5–7, 6–3, [10–7]
Win	3.	25 July 2016	Thu Dau Mot City, Vietnam F1	Hard	(Indonesia) Christopher Rungkat	(Japan) Gengo Kikuchi (Japan) Shunrou Takeshima	6–3, 6–1
Win	4.	23 August 2016	Makassar, Indonesia F2	Hard	(Indonesia) Christopher Rungkat	(Chinese Taipei) Lin Wei-de (Chinese Taipei) Yu Cheng-yu	6–1, 6–4
Loss	4.	23 October 2016	Thu Dau Mot City, Vietnam F7	Hard	(Philippines) Francis Casey Alcantara	(China) Chang Yu (China) Wang Aoran	7–5, 3–6, [5–10]
Loss	5.	30 October 2016	Thu Dau Mot City, Vietnam F8	Hard	(Philippines) Francis Casey Alcantara	(South Korea) Kim Young Seok (South Korea) Noh Sang-woo	6–0, 4–6, [8–10]
Loss	6.	4 August 2018	Jakarta, Indonesia F2	Hard	(South Korea) Kim Cheong Eui	(Japan) Sho Shimabukuro (Japan) Kaito Uesugi	4–6, 6–7^{(4–7)}
Win	5.	9 June 2019	M15 Singapore	Hard	(United Kingdom) Jonathan Gray	(Japan) Kazuma Kawachi (Japan) Kazuki Nishiwaki	7–5, 4–6, [10–6]
Loss	7.	11 June 2023	M25 Jakarta	Hard	(Indonesia) Anthony Susanto	(Indonesia) Nathan Anthony Barki (Indonesia) Christopher Rungkat	4–6, 4–6
