= Manila Challenger =

- 2016 Manila Challenger

Defunct tennis tournament
- Location: Manila, Philippines
- Venue: Rizal Memorial Tennis Center
- Category: ATP Challenger Tour
- Surface: Hard / Outdoors
- Prize money: $75,000

The Manila Challenger (also known as the Philippine Open ATP Manila Challenger) was a tennis tournament held in Manila, Philippines in 2016. The event was part of the ATP Challenger Tour and was played on outdoor hardcourts. The inaugural edition of the Manila Challenger was held at the newly refurbished Rizal Memorial Tennis Center in Manila on January 18–24, 2016 with local players and experienced ATP-ranked tennis players vying for the top prize of $75,000.

== Results ==
=== Singles ===
Year	Champion	Runner-up	Score
2016	(Russia) Mikhail Youzhny	(Switzerland) Marco Chiudinelli	6–4, 6–4

=== Doubles ===
Year	Champions	Runners-up	Score
2016	(Sweden) Johan Brunström (Denmark) Frederik Nielsen	(Philippines) Francis Casey Alcantara (Indonesia) Christopher Rungkat	6–2, 6–2
