= Francis Alcantara =

Filipino tennis player (born 1992)

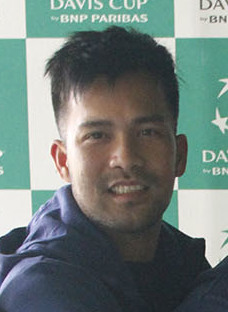
- Alcantara in 2018
- Full name: Francis Casey Alcantara
- Country (sports): Philippines
- Residence: Cagayan de Oro, Philippines
- Born: February 4, 1992 (age 34) Cagayan de Oro, Philippines
- Height: 1.75 m (5 ft 9 in)
- Turned pro: 2015
- Plays: Right-handed (two-handed backhand)
- Prize money: US $87,595

Singles
- Career record: 6–4
- Highest ranking: No. 758 (November 6, 2017)

Grand Slam singles results
- Australian Open Junior: 1R (2009, 2010)
- French Open Junior: 1R (2009)
- Wimbledon Junior: 2R (2010)
- US Open Junior: 1R (2009)

Doubles
- Career record: 7–2
- Highest ranking: No. 162 (February 19, 2024)
- Current ranking: No. 481 (September 14, 2026)

Grand Slam doubles results
- Australian Open Junior: W (2009)
- French Open Junior: 2R (2009, 2010)
- Wimbledon Junior: 2R (2010)
- US Open Junior: 1R (2009)
Medal record
Men's tennis
Representing the Philippines
Asian Games
Bronze medal – third place	2022 Hangzhou	Mixed doubles
Southeast Asian Games
Gold medal – first place	2019 Philippines	Doubles
Gold medal – first place	2023 Cambodia	Doubles
Silver medal – second place	2017 Kuala Lumpur	Doubles
Silver medal – second place	2021 Vietnam	Doubles
Bronze medal – third place	2015 Singapore	Doubles
Bronze medal – third place	2015 Singapore	Team
Bronze medal – third place	2025 Thailand	Team
Bronze medal – third place	2025 Thailand	Mixed doubles
- Last updated on: September 18, 2026.

Francis Casey "Niño" Alcantara (born February 4, 1992) is a professional tennis player from the Philippines. He has a career-high ATP singles ranking of No. 758 achieved on November 6, 2017, and a doubles ranking of No. 162 achieved on February 19, 2024.

== Early life and education ==
Francis Casey "Niño" Alcantara was born to Sarah and Francis Alcantara. He is the eldest of three brothers. Niño Alcantara took up tennis when he was four or five years old at the Nazareth Tennis Club, which was near their residence in Cagayan de Oro. He was influenced by his father who played the sport as well. His brothers and cousins also played the sport.

When Alcantara was still a ten-year old elementary school student, his father died. He stopped regular schooling in his early teenage years opting for homeschooling through Xavier University – Ateneo de Cagayan, so he can train full-time in tennis in Manila. He finished his high school studied in March 2009.

Alcantara later studied in the United States at the California State University, Fresno and Pepperdine University.

== Career ==
=== Junior ===
When Alcantara was 11 years old he was scouted by Romeo Chan as a tennis player. Chan who went to Cagayan de Oro invited Alcantara to reside and train with him in Manila. Alcantara accepted the offer and started playing in junior grand slams in various parts of the world.

He won the 2009 Australian Open Boys' Doubles event with Hsieh Cheng-peng, beating Mikhail Biryukov and Yasutaka Uchiyama, 6–4, 6–2 in the final.

On January 1, 2009, Alcantara reached his highest junior ranking of world number 14. In winning the 2009 Australian Open Boys' Doubles title, Alcantara and Cheng-peng did not lose a set during the entire tournament.

=== College ===
Alcantara played college tennis at the United States NCAA, suiting up for the Fresno State Bulldogs from 2011 to 2012, and the Pepperdine Waves from 2012 to 2014.

=== Professional ===
After graduating from Pepperdine, Alcantara turned professional.

=== National team ===
Alcantara made his debut for the Philippines Davis Cup team at the 2009 Asia/Oceania Zone Group II competition.

Alcantara has also represented the country in other tournaments such as six editions of the SEA Games; as well as the 2022 and 2026 Asian Games.

== Personal life ==
Alcantara is married to Meanne Estacio, with whom he has a son.

== Junior Grand Slam finals ==
=== Doubles: 1 (1 win) ===
Result	Year	Tournament	Surface	Partner	Opponents	Score
Win	2009	Australian Open	Hard	(Chinese Taipei) Hsieh Cheng-Peng	(Russia) Mikhail Biryukov (Japan) Yasutaka Uchiyama	6–4, 6–2

== Davis Cup ==
Legend
Group membership
World Group (0)
Group I (0–1)
Group II (13–5)
Group III (0)
Group IV (0)

- ▲ ▼ indicates the outcome of the Davis Cup match followed by the score, date, place of event, the zonal classification and its phase, and the court surface.

Rubber outcome	No.	Rubber	Match type (partner if any)	Opponent nation	Opponent player(s)	Score
▲4–1; 6–8 March 2009; Victoria Park, Hong Kong, China; Group II Asia/Oceania First round; Hard surface
Victory	3.	V	Singles (dead rubber)	Hong Kong	Michael Lai	6–4, 6–4
▲3–2; 10–12 July 2009; Philippine Columbian Association, Manila, Philippines; Group II Asia/Oceania Second round; Clay surface
Defeat	4.	V	Singles (dead rubber)	Pakistan	Jalil Khan	6–1, 6–7^{(8–10)}, 3–6
▼0–5; 5–7 March 2010; Namihaya Dome, Osaka, Japan; Group I Asia/Oceania First round; Carpet surface
Defeat	4.	V	Singles (dead rubber)	Japan	Go Soeda	1–6, 0–6
▲5–0; 6–8 April 2012; Philippine Columbian Association, Manila, Philippines; Group II Asia/Oceania Second round; Clay surface
Victory	4.	IV	Singles (dead rubber)	Pakistan	Muhammad Abid	6–2, 6–1
▼2–3; 14–16 September 2012; Gelora Bung Karno Tennis Stadium, Jakarta, Indonesia; Group II Asia/Oceania Third round; Hard surface
Defeat	4.	I	Singles	Indonesia	Christopher Rungkat	6–7^{(3–7)}, 2–6, 6–3, 0–6
Victory	4.	V	Singles (dead rubber)	Indonesia	Sunu Wahyu Trijati	6–3, 6–7^{(4–7)}, 6–4
▲3–2; 5–7 April 2013; Plantation Bay Resort & Spa, Lapu-Lapu City, Philippines; Group II Asia/Oceania Second round; Clay surface
Victory	4.	III	Doubles (with Treat Huey)	Thailand	Pruchya Isaro Nuttanon Kadchapanan	6–3, 6–3, 7–6^{(7–4)}
Victory	4.	V	Singles (dead rubber)	Thailand	Wishaya Trongcharoenchaikul	6–4, 4–6, 6–0
▼2–3; 13–15 September 2013; Plantation Bay Resort & Spa, Lapu-Lapu City, Philippines; Group II Asia/Oceania Third round; Clay surface
Victory	4.	III	Doubles (with Treat Huey)	New Zealand	Marcus Daniell Artem Sitak	6–4, 6–3, 6–4
▲5–0; 5–8 March 2015; Valle Verde Country Club, Pasig, Philippines; Group II Asia/Oceania First round; Clay surface
Victory	4.	III	Doubles (with Treat Huey)	Sri Lanka	Sharmal Dissanayake Dineshkanthan Thangarajah	3–6, 6–3, 6–2, 6–4
Victory	4.	V	Singles (dead rubber)	Sri Lanka	Dineshkanthan Thangarajah	6–2, 6–3
▲5–0; 4–6 March 2016; Valle Verde Country Club, Pasig, Philippines; Group II Asia/Oceania First round; Clay surface
Victory	2.	III	Doubles (with Treat Huey)	Kuwait	Abdulrahman Alawadhi Abdulhamid Mubarak	6–1, 6–1, 6–2
Victory	2.	V	Singles (dead rubber)	Kuwait	Ali Ghareeb	6–2, 6–1
▼1–3; 15–17 July 2016; Philippine Columbian Association, Manila, Philippines; Group II Asia/Oceania Second round; Clay surface
Defeat	2.	II	Singles	Chinese Taipei	Huang Lang-chi	1–6, 6–3, 7–6^{(7–4)}, 1–6, 0–1 ret.
▲4–1; 3–5 February 2017; Philippine Columbian Association, Manila, Philippines; Group II Asia/Oceania First round; Clay surface
Victory	1.	III	Doubles (with Treat Huey)	Indonesia	David Agung Susanto Sunu Wahyu Trijati	6–2, 6–4, 6–4
▲4–1; 3–4 February 2018; Gelora Bung Karno Tennis Stadium Complex, Jakarta, Indonesia; Group II Asia/Oceania First round; Hard surface
Victory	1.	III	Doubles (with Jurence Zosimo Mendoza)	Indonesia	Justin Barki David Agung Susanto	7–6^{(7–5)}, 6–3
▼1–4; 7–8 April 2018; Philippine Columbian Association, Manila, Philippines; Group II Asia/Oceania Second round; Clay surface
Defeat	1.	III	Doubles (with Johnny Arcilla)	Thailand	Sanchai Ratiwatana Sonchat Ratiwatana	6–4, 6–7^{(3–7)}, 1–6
▼1–3; 5–6 April 2019; The National Tennis Development Center, Nonthaburi, Thailand; Group II Asia/Oceania; Hard surface
Defeat	1.	III	Doubles (with Jurence Zosimo Mendoza)	Thailand	Sanchai Ratiwatana Sonchat Ratiwatana	4–6, 5–7
▼1–4; 6–7 March 2020; Philippine Columbian Association, Manila, Philippines; Group II Play-offs; Clay surface
Victory	3.	III	Doubles (with Ruben Gonzales)	Greece	Markos Kalovelonis Petros Tsitsipas	7–6^{(7–5)}, 6–4

== Challenger and Futures Finals ==
=== Singles: 1 (0–1) ===
Result	W–L	Date	Tournament	Tier	Surface	Opponent	Score
Loss	0–1	Oct 2016	Vietnam F9, Thủ Dầu Một	Futures	Hard	(France) Enzo Couacaud	1–6, 1–6

=== Doubles: 51 (25–26) ===
Legend (doubles) ATP Challenger Tour (0–6) ITF Futures Tour (25–20)	Titles by surface Hard (23–25) Clay (2–1) Grass (0–0) Carpet (0–0)

Result	W–L	Date	Tournament	Tier	Surface	Partner	Opponents	Score
Win	1–0	Oct 2015	Philippines F2, Manila	Futures	Clay (i)	(Philippines) Johnny Arcilla	(Japan) Katsuki Nagao (Japan) Hiromasa Oku	6–2, 6–2
Loss	1–1	Jan 2016	Manila, Philippines	Challenger	Hard	(Indonesia) Christopher Rungkat	(Sweden) Johan Brunström (Denmark) Frederik Nielsen	2–6, 2–6
Loss	1–2	Oct 2016	Vietnam F7, Thủ Dầu Một	Futures	Hard	(Indonesia) David Agung Susanto	(China) Chang Yu (China) Wang Aoran	7–5, 3–6, [5-10]
Loss	1–3	Oct 2016	Vietnam F8, Thủ Dầu Một	Futures	Hard	(Indonesia) David Agung Susanto	(South Korea) Kim Young Seok (South Korea) Noh Sang-woo	6–0, 4–6, [8-10]
Win	2–3	Mar 2017	Eygypt F8, Sharm El Sheikh	Futures	Hard	(Zimbabwe) Benjamin Lock	(Chinese Taipei) Chen TI (China) Sun Fajing	6–3, 6–7^{(7–9)}, [10-7]
Loss	2–4	Mar 2017	Bahrain F1, Manama	Futures	Hard	(Zimbabwe) Benjamin Lock	(Sweden) Markus Eriksson (Sweden) Milos Sekulic	3–6, 1–6
Win	3–4	May 2017	Singapore F1, Singapore	Futures	Hard	(Netherlands) Sem Verbeek	(Japan) Hiroyasu Ehara (Japan) Sho Katayama	6–3, 6–2
Win	4–4	May 2017	Singapore F2, Singapore	Futures	Hard	(Netherlands) Sem Verbeek	(Japan) Soichiro Moritani (Japan) Masato Shiga	6–3, 6–4
Win	5–4	Jun 2017	Singapore F3, Singapore	Futures	Hard	(Netherlands) Sem Verbeek	(Japan) Yuichi Ito (Vietnam) Lý Hoàng Nam	7–6^{(7–3)}, 6–2
Win	6–4	Jun 2017	Hong Kong F1, Hong Kong	Futures	Hard	(India) Karunuday Singh	(Japan) Yuki Mochizuki (Japan) Tomohiro Masabayashi	6–3, 4–6, [11-9]
Loss	6–5	Jul 2017	China F12, Shenzhen	Futures	Hard	(India) Karunuday Singh	(Vietnam) Lý Hoàng Nam (China) Sun Fajing	4–6, 4–6
Loss	6–6	Oct 2017	Australia F7, Cairns	Futures	Hard	(Netherlands) Sem Verbeek	(United States) Nathan Pasha (Australia) Darren Polkinghorne	2–6, 6–2, [2-10]
Win	7–6	May 2018	Singapore F2, Singapore	Futures	Hard	(United States) Collin Altamirano	(Japan) Shintaro Imai (Japan) Takuto Niki	6–1, 6–4
Loss	7–7	May 2018	China F7, Luzhou	Futures	Hard	(China) Sun Fajing	(New Zealand) Rhett Purcell (Germany) Sami Reinwein	5–7, 3–6
Win	8–7	Jun 2018	China F8, Yinchuan	Futures	Hard	(China) Sun Fajing	(Japan) Kento Takeuchi (Thailand) Wishaya Trongcharoenchaikul	6–4, 2–6, [10-5]
Loss	8–8	Jun 2018	Hong Kong F1, Hong Kong	Futures	Hard	(Chinese Taipei) Yi Chu-Huan	(Hong Kong) Wong Chun-hun (Hong Kong) Yeung Pak-long	4–6, 2–6
Loss	8–9	Jul 2018	Malaysia F3, Kuala Lumpur	Futures	Hard	(United States) John Paul Fruttero	(South Korea) Kim Cheong-eui (South Korea) Noh Sang-woo	1–6, 6–3, [5-10]
Loss	8–10	Aug 2018	Indonesia F3, Jakarta	Futures	Hard	(Japan) Kaito Uesugi	(Indonesia) Justin Barki (Indonesia) Christopher Rungkat	3–6, 2–6
Win	9–10	Sep 2018	Thailand F4, Hua Hin	Futures	Hard	(India) Karunuday Singh	(Thailand) Palaphoom Kovapitukted (Thailand) Nuttanon Kadchapanan	6–3, 7–5
Win	10–10	Oct 2018	Thailand F5, Hua Hin	Futures	Hard	(Japan) Shintaro Imai	(Poland) Adrian Andrzejczuk (Chinese Taipei) Yu Cheng-yu	7–5, 6–7^{(5–7)}, [10-7]
Win	11–10	Oct 2018	Thailand F6, Hua Hin	Futures	Hard	(Thailand) Sonchat Ratiwatana	(New Zealand) Ajeet Rai (India) Karunuday Singh	6–1, 1–6, [10-6]
Loss	11–11	Oct 2018	Vietnam F4, Tây Ninh	Futures	Hard	(Sweden) Markus Eriksson	(Vietnam) Lê Quốc Khánh (Vietnam) Lý Hoàng Nam	4–6, 7–6^{(8–6)}, [10-12]
Win	12–11	Oct 2018	Vietnam F5, Tây Ninh	Futures	Hard	(Sweden) Markus Eriksson	(Vietnam) Lý Hoàng Nam (Russia) Roman Safiullin	5–7, 6–4, [10-7]
Loss	12–12	Nov 2018	Thailand F8, Nonthaburi	Futures	Hard	(Portugal) Bernardo Saraiva	(Chinese Taipei) Hsu Yu-hsiou (Chinese Taipei) Yu Cheng-yu	1–6, 0–6
Loss	12–13	Jul 2019	M25 Qujing, China	World Tennis Tour	Hard	(New Zealand) Rhett Purcell	(China) Hua Runhao (China) Sun Fajing	1–6, 1–6
Loss	12–14	Sep 2019	M25 Brisbane, Australia	World Tennis Tour	Hard	(Australia) Harry Bourchier	(Australia) Jake Delaney (Australia) Luke Saville	1–6, 6–3, [6-10]
Loss	12–15	Oct 2019	M15 Doha, Qatar	World Tennis Tour	Hard	(Russia) Bogdan Bobrov	(Netherlands) Guy Den Heijer (Netherlands) Sidane Pontjodikromo	6–7^{(6–8)}, 6–4, [6-10]
Win	13–15	Oct 2021	M25 Calabasas, USA	World Tennis Tour	Hard	(United States) Raymond Sarmiento	(Estonia) Johannes Seeman (United States) Wally Thayne	6–4, 6–2
Win	14–15	Nov 2021	M25 Harlingen, USA	World Tennis Tour	Hard	(United Kingdom) Mark Whitehouse	(Romania) Gabi Adrian Boitan (Germany) Constantin Frantzen	7–6^{(7–3)}, 5–7, [10-7]
Loss	14–16	Feb 2022	M15 Sharm el-Sheikh, Egypt	World Tennis Tour	Hard	(Canada) Kelsey Stevenson	(Italy) Samuel Vincent Ruggeri (Italy) Francesco Vilardo	6–2, 5–7, [3-10]
Loss	14–17	Mar 2022	M15 Sharm el-Sheikh, Egypt	World Tennis Tour	Hard	(Canada) Kelsey Stevenson	Petr Bar Biryukov Marat Sharipov	7–6^{(8–6)}, 3–6, [8-10]
Loss	14–18	Apr 2022	M15 Cairo, Egypt	World Tennis Tour	Clay	(Northern Mariana Islands) Colin Sinclair	(Argentina) Lorenzo Joaquin Rodriguez Ilya Rudiukov	5–7, 4–6
Win	15–18	May 2022	M25 Cairo, Egypt	World Tennis Tour	Clay	(Northern Mariana Islands) Colin Sinclair	Denis Klok Ilya Rudiukov	6–3, 6–3
Win	16–18	Jun 2022	M15 Tây Ninh, Thailand	World Tennis Tour	Hard	(Vietnam) Nam Hoang Ly	(South Korea) Park Ui-sung (South Korea) Son Ji-hoon	6–3, 6–1
Loss	16–19	Aug 2022	Nonthaburi, Thailand	Challenger	Hard	(Indonesia) Christopher Rungkat	(Zimbabwe) Benjamin Lock (Japan) Yuta Shimizu	1–6, 3–6
Loss	16–20	Sep 2022	Nonthaburi, Thailand	Challenger	Hard	(Indonesia) Christopher Rungkat	(South Korea) Chung Yun-seong (New Zealand) Ajeet Rai	1–6, 6–7^{(6–8)}
Win	17–20	Oct 2022	M25 Tay Ninh, Vietnam	World Tennis Tour	Hard	(Thailand) Pruchya Isaro	(Chinese Taipei) Yu Hsiou Hsu (Thailand) Wishaya Trongcharoenchaikul	2–6, 6–3, [10–3]
Win	18–20	Mar 2023	M25 New Delhi, India	World Tennis Tour	Hard	(Thailand) Pruchya Isaro	(India) Parikshit Somani (India) Manish Sureshkumar	6–2, 6–4
Loss	18–21	Apr 2023	M15 Singapore, Singapore	World Tennis Tour	Hard	(China) Sun Fajing	(Indonesia) Justin Barki (Netherlands) Igor Sijsling	1–6, 1–6
Loss	18–22	Apr 2023	M25 Jakarta, Indonesia	World Tennis Tour	Hard	(Thailand) Pruchya Isaro	(Chinese Taipei) Ray Ho (China) Sun Fajing	4–6, 5–7
Win	19–22	Jun 2023	M25 Jakarta, Indonesia	World Tennis Tour	Hard	(Japan) Hiroki Moriya	(Indonesia) Nathan Anthony Barki (Indonesia) Christopher Rungkat	6–2, 6–1
Win	20–22	Jun 2023	M25 Nakhon Si Thammarat, Thailand	World Tennis Tour	Hard	(Japan) Hiroki Moriya	(Thailand) Maximus Jones (New Zealand) Finn Reynolds	6–2, 6–4
Loss	20–23	Jul 2023	Segovia, Spain	Challenger	Hard	(China) Sun Fajing	(France) Dan Added (France) Pierre-Hugues Herbert	6–4, 3–6, [10–12]
Loss	20–24	Aug 2023	Zhangjiagang, China	Challenger	Hard	(China) Sun Fajing	(Chinese Taipei) Ray Ho (Australia) Matthew Romios	3–6, 4–6
Win	21–24	Nov 2023	M15 Ipoh, Malaysia	World Tennis Tour	Hard	(Indonesia) Christopher Rungkat	(Netherlands) Thijmen Loof (Thailand) Wishaya Trongcharoenchaikul	6–2, 6–0
Win	22–24	Nov 2023	M15 Kuala Lumpur, Malaysia	World Tennis Tour	Hard	(Indonesia) Christopher Rungkat	(Thailand) Pruchya Isaro (Netherlands) Thijmen Loof	6–4, 6–2
Loss	22–25	Jan 2024	Nonthaburi, Thailand	Challenger	Hard	(China) Sun Fajing	(France) Manuel Guinard (France) Grégoire Jacq	4–6, 6–7^{(6–8)}
Win	23–25	Jan 2024	M25 Chennai, India	World Tennis Tour	Hard	(Indonesia) Christopher Rungkat	Bogdan Bobrov (India) Adil Kalyanpur	6–4, 6–2
Loss	23–26	Jul 2024	M15 Nakhon Si Thammarat, Thailand	World Tennis Tour	Hard	(Thailand) Maximus Jones	(India) Adil Kalyanpur (India) Vishnu Vardhan	3–6, 2–6
Win	24–26	Jul 2024	M15 Nakhon Si Thammarat, Thailand	World Tennis Tour	Hard	(Thailand) Maximus Jones	(India) Rishi Reddy (India) Dhakshineswar Suresh	7–6^{(9–7)}, 6–4
Win	25–26	Jul 2024	M15 Nakhon Si Thammarat, Thailand	World Tennis Tour	Hard	(Thailand) Maximus Jones	(India) Adil Kalyanpur (India) Vishnu Vardhan	2–6, 7–5, [10–8]

== ITF World Tennis Tour Juniors ==
=== Singles: 8 (5 titles, 3 runners-up) ===
Legend
Category GA (0–0)
Category G1 (0–0)
Category G2 (0–1)
Category G3 (0–0)
Category G4 (5–1)
Category G5 (0–1)

Result	W–L	Date	Tournament	Category	Surface	Opponent	Score
Win	1–0	Nov 2007	ITF World Junior Tennis Championship, Malaysia	Category G4	Hard	(India) Karunuday Singh	7–6^{(8–6)}, 5–7, 6–4
Loss	1–1	Nov 2007	Singapore International Junior Championships, Singapore	Category G5	Hard	(Malaysia) Juan Antonio Los Santos	4–6, 2–6
Loss	1–2	Dec 2007	PHINMA/ITF Intl Junior Tournament 1, Philippines	Category G4	Hard	(Russia) Artem Ilyushin	4–6, 3–6
Win	2–2	Dec 2007	PHINMA/ITF Intl Junior Tournament 2, Philippines	Category G4	Hard	(Australia) James Duckworth	6–7^{(4–7)}, 6–3, 1–0 ret.
Loss	2–3	Oct 2008	LTAT Junior Championships, Thailand	Category G2	Hard	(Japan) Shuichi Sekiguchi	4–6, 2–6
Win	3–3	Nov 2008	PHINMA/ITF Intl Junior Tournament 1, Philippines	Category G4	Hard	(South Korea) Park Sang-min	6–4, 6–3
Win	4–3	Nov 2009	PHINMA International Juniors (Week 1), Philippines	Category G4	Hard	(Japan) Yoshihito Nishioka	7–5, 6–0
Win	5–3	Dec 2009	PHINMA International Juniors (Week 2), Philippines	Category G4	Hard	(Belgium) Jeroen Vanneste	6–2, 6–3

=== Doubles: 18 (14 title, 4 runners-up) ===
Legend
Category GA (1–0)
Category G1 (5–1)
Category G2 (3–0)
Category G3 (1–1)
Category G4 (2–2)
Category G5 (2–0)

Result	W–L	Date	Tournament	Category	Surface	Partner	Opponents	Score
Win	1–0	Sep 2007	Hyogo International Junior Tournament 2, Japan	Category G5	Carpet	(Japan) Hiroyasu Ehara	(Japan) Musashi Hoshino (Japan) Kishi Watanabe	7–6^{(7–3)}, 6–4
Win	2–0	Sep 2007	China Junior II, China	Category G3	Hard	(Chinese Taipei) Hsieh Cheng-peng	(New Zealand) Logan Mackenzie (Australia) Dane Propoggia	7–6^{(7–2)}, 6–4
Win	3–0	Oct 2007	TrueVisions Thailand Open, Thailand	Category G2	Hard	(Chinese Taipei) Hsieh Cheng-peng	(Japan) Yuki Matsuo (Japan) Hiroki Moriya	6–3, 7–6^{(7–1)}
Win	4–0	Nov 2007	ITF Junior Toyota Open, Thailand	Category G4	Hard	(Australia) Marious Zelba	(United Kingdom) Niall Angus (United Kingdom) Thomas Knights	6–2, 7–6^{(7–1)}
Loss	4–1	Nov 2007	ITF World Junior Tennis Championship, Malaysia	Category G4	Hard	(France) Romain Sichez	(India) Vikram Reddy B (India) Karunuday Singh	6–7^{(6–8)}, 5–7
Win	5–1	Nov 2007	Singapore International Junior Championships, Singapore	Category G5	Hard	(Singapore) Min-Sylvester Wee	(India) Chandril Sood (India) Lakshit Sood	6–4, 6–2
Loss	5–2	Dec 2007	PHINMA/ITF Intl Junior Tournament 1, Philippines	Category G4	Hard	(Australia) James Duckworth	(Chinese Taipei) Huang Liang-chi (Chinese Taipei) Li Chieh-lin	3–6, 6–2, 3–6
Win	6–2	May 2008	RUC Tennis International Junior Open, Morocco	Category G4	Clay	(Egypt) Karim-Mohamed Maamoun	(United Kingdom) Ahmed El Menshawy (United Kingdom) Oliver Evans	6–3, 6–1
Loss	6–3	Jun 2008	Riad 21, Morocco	Category G3	Clay	(Egypt) Karim-Mohamed Maamoun	(Australia) Maverick Banes (Australia) Nat Maraga	6–4, 3–6, 2–6
Win	7–3	Jun 2008	Raquette D'Or, Morocco	Category G2	Clay	(Egypt) Karim-Mohamed Maamoun	(United States) William R Parker (Australia) David Sofaer	6–4, 3–6, 6–2
Win	8–3	Oct 2008	LTAT Junior Championships, Thailand	Category G2	Hard	(Chinese Taipei) Huang Liang-chi	(Hong Kong) Dino Dell'Orto (Canada) Kelsey Stevenson	6–1, 6–7^{(2–7)}, 6–2
Win	9–3	Jan 2009	Australian Open, Australia	Category GA	Hard	(Chinese Taipei) Hsieh Cheng-Peng	(Russia) Mikhail Biryukov (Japan) Yasutaka Uchiyama	6–4, 6–2
Loss	9–4	Mar 2009	ITF/LTAT Junior Championships, Thailand	Category G1	Hard	(Chinese Taipei) Huang Liang-chi	(Austria) Maximilian Neuchrist (Germany) Dominik Schulz	2–6, 3–6
Win	10–4	Mar 2009	13th Sarawak Chief Minister's Cup, Malaysia	Category G1	Hard	(Sweden) Daniel Berta	(United Kingdom) Alastair Barnes (United Kingdom) Ahmed El Menshawy	6–3, 6–3
Win	11–4	Mar 2009	20th Mitsubishi-Lancer International Juniors Championships, Philippines	Category G1	Hard	(Sweden) Daniel Berta	(New Zealand) Ben McLachlan (New Zealand) Riki McLachlan	6–3, 6–0
Win	12–4	May 2009	45th Astrid Bowl Charleroi, Belgium	Category G1	Clay	(Chinese Taipei) Hsieh Cheng-Peng	(Brazil) Guilherme Clezar (Egypt) Karim-Mohamed Maamoun	6–3, 6–2
Win	13–4	Jun 2009	17th International Junior Tournament of Offenbach/Main, Germany	Category G1	Clay	(Chinese Taipei) Huang Liang-chi	(Peru) Duilio Beretta (Ecuador) Roberto Quiroz	6–2, 4–6, [10-7]
Win	14–4	Mar 2010	21st Mitsubishi-Lancer International Juniors Championships, Philippines	Category G1	Hard	(United States) Raymond Sarmiento	(Republic of Ireland) Sam Barry (New Zealand) Ben McLachlan	6–4, 6–3
