= Aung Naing =

Burmese footballer (born 1972)

U Aung Naing (Burmese: ဦးအောင်နိုင်; born 1972) is a Burmese football manager and former footballer who manages the Myanmar national under-19 football team.

== Career ==
In 1990, Aung Naing signed for Malaysian side Perak, where he was regarded as one of the club's most important players. He formed an attacking partnership with South Korean striker Jang Jung. He helped them win the 1990 Malaysian FA Cup.

=== International career ===
Naing represented Myanmar internationally at the 1991 SEA Games.

== Style of play ==
Aung Naing mainly operated as a striker and was known for his work ethic. While playing for Perak, he was regarded as a fan favorite and was described as having a "positive attitude and technical skills were evident in every game".

== Managerial career ==
In 2019, Aung Naing was appointed manager of Burmese side Shan United, helping the club win the league. He was awarded the 2019 Myanmar National League Best Manager.
