= Ariez Elyaas Deen Heshaam =

Malaysian tennis player

- Country (sports): Malaysia
- Born: 24 December 1993 (age 31) Sarawak, Malaysia
- Plays: Right-handed
- Prize money: $12,415

Singles
- Career record: 4–9 (ATP Tour & Davis Cup)
- Highest ranking: No. 1498 (20 Feb 2012)

Doubles
- Career record: 0–6 (ATP Tour & Davis Cup)
- Highest ranking: No. 1378 (16 May 2011)
Medal record
Men's Tennis
Representing Malaysia
Southeast Asian Games
Bronze medal – third place	2015 Singapore	Team

Ariez Elyaas Deen Heshaam (born 24 December 1993) is a Malaysian former professional tennis player.

Elyaas, the son of former national tennis head coach Deen Heshaam, comes from Kuching on the island of Borneo and was a member of the Malaysia Davis Cup team from 2010 to 2015, debuting as a 16-year old. He appeared in a total of 15 ties, for wins in four singles rubbers.

On the ATP Tour, Elyaas featured in his only singles main draw at the 2012 Proton Malaysian Open, held in Kuala Lumpur. Competing as a wildcard, he was beaten in the first round by Igor Sijsling.

Elyaas's career included a stint playing U.S. collegiate tennis for the University of the Cumberlands.

In 2015 he won a team bronze medal for Malaysia at the Southeast Asian Games in Singapore.
