= Nguyễn Hoàng Thiên =

Vietnamese tennis player

- Country (sports): Vietnam
- Residence: Bình Dương, Vietnam
- Born: 12 March 1995 (age 30) Ho Chi Minh City, Vietnam
- Height: 1.80 m (5 ft 11 in)
- Retired: 2019 (last match 2017)
- Plays: Right-handed (one handed-backhand)
- Prize money: $6,228

Singles
- Career record: 11–9 (at ATP Tour level, Grand Slam level, and in Davis Cup)
- Career titles: 0 ITF
- Highest ranking: No. 1,368 (18 June 2012)

Doubles
- Career record: 2–2 (at ATP Tour level, Grand Slam level, and in Davis Cup)
- Career titles: 1 ITF
- Highest ranking: No. 731 (17 July 2017)
Medal record
Men's Tennis
Representing Vietnam
Southeast Asian Games
Bronze medal – third place	2017 Kuala Lumpur	Doubles

Nguyễn Hoàng Thiên (born 12 March 1995) is a Vietnamese tennis player.

Nguyễn has a career high ATP singles ranking of No. 1,368 achieved on 18 June 2012 and a career high ATP doubles ranking of No. 731 achieved on 17 July 2017.

Nguyễn represents Vietnam at the Davis Cup where he has a W/L record of 13–11.
