= Aditya Hari Sasongko =

Indonesian tennis player

- Country (sports): Indonesia
- Born: 4 July 1988 (age 37) Jakarta, Indonesia
- Plays: Left-handed
- Prize money: $6,207

Singles
- Career record: 4–7 (Davis Cup)
- Highest ranking: No. 1102 (7 Nov 2011)

Doubles
- Career record: 0–1 (Davis Cup)
- Highest ranking: No. 975 (24 Sep 2012)
Medal record
Men's Tennis
Representing Indonesia
Southeast Asian Games
Gold medal – first place	2011 Jakarta-Palembang	Tam
Silver medal – second place	2015 Singapore	Team
Bronze medal – third place	2011 Jakarta-Palembang	Mixed doubles

Aditya Hari Sasongko (born 4 July 1988) is an Indonesian former professional tennis player.

A left-handed player from Bantul, Yogyakarta, Sasongko competed on the professional tour at ITF Futures.

Sasongko appeared in 12 Davis Cup rubbers for Indonesia between 2008 and 2017 across 11 ties, registering four singles wins. He also featured in multiple editions of the Southeast Asian Games, including in 2011 when he won a gold medal in the team event. In 2014 he represented Indonesia at the Asian Games in Incheon.

== See also ==
- List of Indonesia Davis Cup team representatives
