= Sunu Wahyu Trijati =

Indonesian tennis player

- Country (sports): Indonesia
- Born: 26 April 1987 (age 39) Jakarta, Indonesia
- Plays: Right-handed

Singles
- Career record: 3–8 (Davis Cup)
- Highest ranking: No. 916 (12 Dec 2005)

Doubles
- Career record: 4–2 (Davis Cup)
- Highest ranking: No. 902 (1 May 2017)
Medal record
Men's tennis
Representing Indonesia
Southeast Asian Games
Silver medal – second place	2005 Manila	Team
Silver medal – second place	2015 Singapore	Team
Bronze medal – third place	2005 Manila	Doubles
Bronze medal – third place	2009 Vientiane	Team
Bronze medal – third place	2015 Singapore	Mixed doubles
Islamic Solidarity Games
Bronze medal – third place	2005 Mecca	Team
Universiade
Bronze medal – third place	2007 Bangkok	Doubles
Men's soft tennis
Representing Indonesia
Asian Games
Bronze medal – third place	2022 Hangzhou	Team
Southeast Asian Games
Gold medal – first place	2023 Cambodia	Team
Bronze medal – third place	2019 Philippines	Team

Sunu Wahyu Trijati (born 26 April 1987) is an Indonesian professional tennis player.

Trijati, a native of Jakarta, made his Davis Cup debut for Indonesia in 2005. He has featured in a total of 13 ties, the last in 2017, for three singles and four doubles wins.

A regular participant in the Southeast Asian Games, Trijati has won five medals in tennis and in 2019 won a further medal as a member of Indonesia's soft tennis team.

== See also ==
- List of Indonesia Davis Cup team representatives
