= Jeson Patrombon =

Filipino tennis player (born 1993)

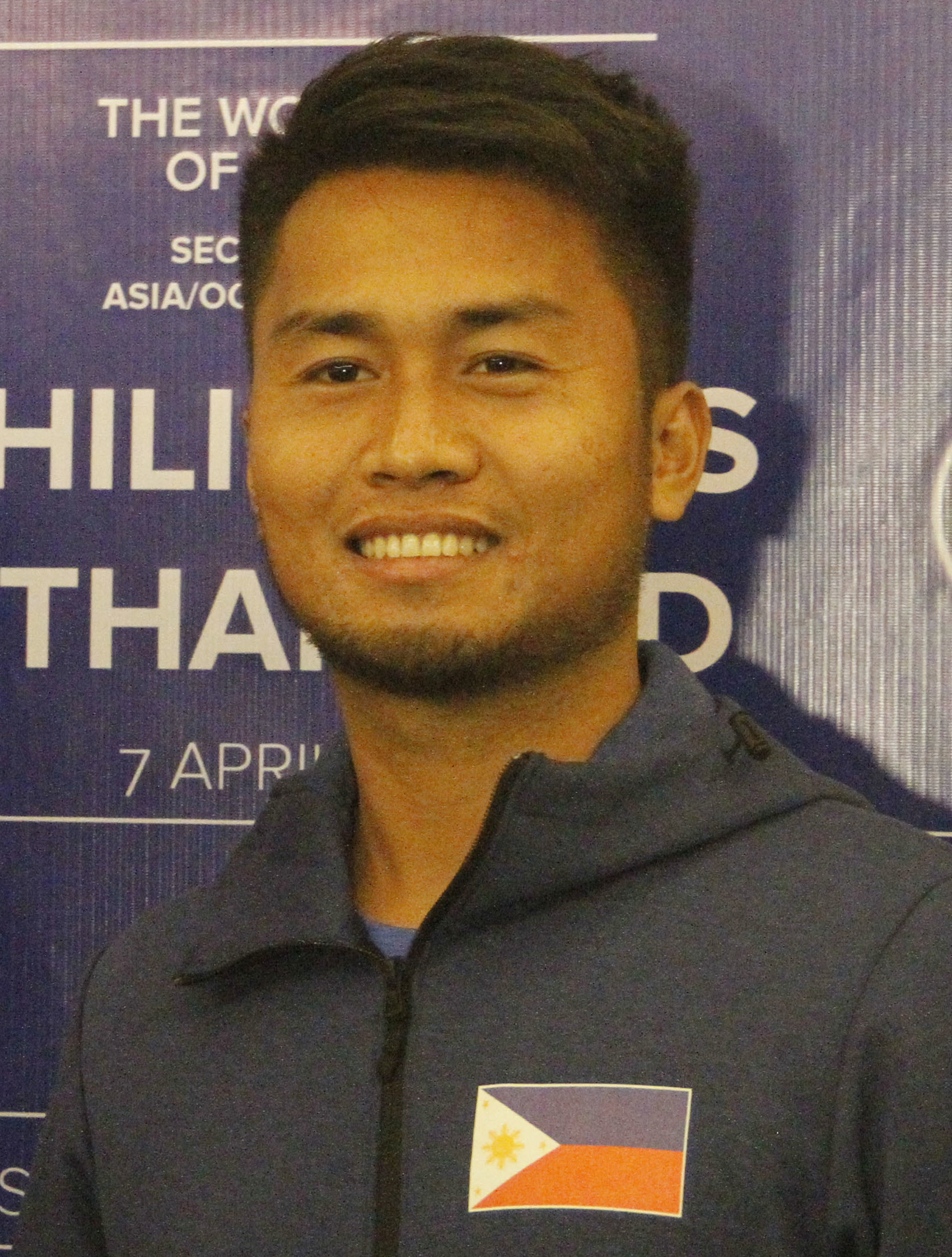
- Patrombon in 2018
- Country (sports): Philippines
- Born: March 27, 1993 (age 32) Iligan, Philippines
- Plays: Right-handed (two handed-backhand)
- Prize money: $16,224

Singles
- Career record: 5–4 (at ATP Tour level, Grand Slam level, and in Davis Cup)
- Career titles: 0
- Highest ranking: No. 869 (13 August 2012)

Grand Slam singles results
- Australian Open Junior: QF (2011)
- French Open Junior: 2R (2010)
- Wimbledon Junior: 2R (2011)
- US Open Junior: 1R (2010, 2011)

Doubles
- Career record: 0–0 (at ATP Tour level, Grand Slam level, and in Davis Cup)
- Career titles: 1 ITF
- Highest ranking: No. 1,063 (5 October 2015)

Grand Slam doubles results
- Australian Open Junior: 2R (2011)
- French Open Junior: 1R (2010)
- Wimbledon Junior: 1R (2010, 2011)
- US Open Junior: 1R (2010, 2011)

Team competitions
- Davis Cup: 5–4
Medal record
Men's Tennis
Representing Philippines
Southeast Asian Games
Gold medal – first place	2019 Philippines	Doubles
Silver medal – second place	2011 Jakarta - Palembang	Team
Silver medal – second place	2015 Singapore	Doubles
Silver medal – second place	2021 Vietnam	Doubles
Bronze medal – third place	2015 Singapore	Singles
Bronze medal – third place	2015 Singapore	Team
Bronze medal – third place	2019 Philippines	Singles
Bronze medal – third place	2021 Vietnam	Team

Jeson Patrombon (born March 27, 1993) is a Filipino tennis player.

On the junior tour, Patrombon had a career high junior ranking of 9 achieved in January 2011. He reached the quarterfinals of the 2011 Australian Open boys' singles event.

Patrombon has a career high ATP singles ranking of No. 869 achieved on 13 August, 2012 and a career high ATP doubles ranking of 1,063 achieved on 5 October 2015. Patrombon has won 1 ITF doubles title.

Patrombon has represented Philippines at the Davis Cup where he has a W/L record of 5–4.
