= Syed Mohd Agil Syed Naguib =

Malaysian tennis player (born 1994)

- Full name: Syed Mohamad Agil bin Syed Naguib
- Country (sports): Malaysia
- Residence: Kuala Lumpur
- Born: 10 February 1994 (age 32) Negeri Sembilan, Malaysia
- Height: 175 cm (5 ft 9 in)
- Turned pro: 2011
- Plays: Right-handed (two-handed backhand)
- Prize money: $12,002

Singles
- Career record: 0–2 (at ATP Tour level, Grand Slam level, and in Davis Cup)
- Career titles: 0
- Highest ranking: No. 1568 (10 November 2014)
- Current ranking: No. 1702

Doubles
- Career record: 0–6 (at ATP Tour level, Grand Slam level, and in Davis Cup)
- Career titles: 0
- Highest ranking: No. 1527 (21 November 2016)
- Current ranking: No. 1533 (28 November 2016)
Medal record
Men's Tennis
Representing Malaysia
Southeast Asian Games
Bronze medal – third place	2015 Singapore	Team
Bronze medal – third place	2021 Vietnam	Team
- Last updated on: 31 January 2021.

Syed Mohd Agil Syed Naguib (born 10 February 1994) is a Malaysian tennis player.

Syed Naguib has a career high ATP singles ranking of 1568 achieved on 10 November 2014. He also has a career high ATP doubles ranking of 1527 achieved on 21 November 2016.

Syed Naguib made his ATP main draw debut at the 2012 Proton Malaysian Open in the doubles competition. At the 2014 Malaysian Open, Kuala Lumpur, he was partnering Nick Kyrgios in the doubles draw. Syed Naguib represents Malaysia in the Davis Cup.

== Personal life ==
Syed Mohd Agil Syed Naguib was born in Negeri Sembilan, Malaysia. His father is ex-Selangor state footballer, Syed Naguib Syed Mohd. He attended primary school in his home state, Negeri Sembilan, before later enrolling into Bukit Jalil Sports School to further his secondary education alongside tennis training. At age 16, he was selected for further training through a national pilot tennis programme under Albert Portas High Performance Camp in Barcelona, Spain.

== Tennis career ==
In 2010, Syed Mohd Agil Syed Naguib championed the singles under-16 male category at the Langkawi Geopark International Junior Tennis Championship, just two days after becoming champion in a preceding tennis tournament in Perlis.

Throughout his professional career, he has repeatedly championed over the Tennis Malaysia National Circuit Series, and held his number one ranking as national singles men's champion over a number of years. He is also a doubles specialist and have won a series of national and international tournaments alongside top national tennis players.

In 2011, he was paired with national singles women's champion, Jawairiah Noordin, in a mixed-doubles category during the Malaysian Tennis Title and the pair won gold.

In 2012, Syed Mohd Agil Syed Naguib debuted in his first ATP Malaysian Open in the singles qualifying draw, receiving a wildcard entry alongside four other top local players.

In the 2013 ATP Malaysian Open, he paired with Indian tennis player, Yuki Bhambri, but lost to Julien Benneteau-Nenad Zimonjić in the first round.

During the 2014 ATP Malaysian Open, he won against fellow national representative, Mohd Assri Merzuki, in the first qualifying round of the men's single, but lost in the second round to Japanese player, Takuto Niki. He also partnered with Australian star Nick Kyrgios in the main draw doubles event.

At the 2015 Southeast Asian Games, Syed Mohd Agil Syed Naguib, made the country proud after bagging Malaysia their second tennis medal, winning a Bronze medal in a match against Singapore for a team event.

During the 2017 Southeast Asian Games, he paired with Mohd Assri Merzuki.

In 2019, he won the male doubles category alongside partner, Mohd Assri Merzuki at the national circuit. At the 2019 Southeast Asian Games, he represented Malaysia alongside compatriots Shamirul Shahril Adam Das in men's doubles category and Jawairiah Noordin in mixed doubles category.
