= Mohd Assri Merzuki =

Malaysian tennis player

- Country (sports): Malaysia
- Born: 28 December 1994 (age 31) Kota Kinabalu, Sabah, Malaysia
- Plays: Right-handed (two-handed backhand)
- Prize money: $12,373

Singles
- Career record: 14–13
- Career titles: 0 ITF
- Highest ranking: No. 1333 (10 November 2014)

Doubles
- Career record: 9–8
- Career titles: 1 ITF
- Highest ranking: No. 794 (20 February 2012)
- Current ranking: No. 1509 (29 January 2018)
Medal record
Men's Tennis
Representing Malaysia
Southeast Asian Games
| Bronze medal – third place | 2015 Singapore | Team |
- Last updated on: 2 February 2018.

Mohd Assri Merzuki (born 28 December 1994) is a Malaysian tennis player who is now retired, currently a junior coach of the sport itself.

== Career ==
Assri has a career high ATP singles ranking of 1333 achieved on 10 November 2014. He also has a career high ATP doubles ranking of 795 achieved on 20 February 2012.

Assri made his ATP main draw debut at the 2015 Malaysian Open, Kuala Lumpur in the doubles draw partnering Syed Mohd Agil Syed Naguib. Assri represented Malaysia in the Davis Cup.

== ATP Challenger and ITF Futures finals ==
=== Doubles: 3 (1–2) ===
ATP Challenger (0–0)
ITF Futures (1–2)

| Result | W–L | Date | Tournament | Tier | Surface | Partner | Opponents | Score |
|---|---|---|---|---|---|---|---|---|
| Win | 1–0 | Jun 2011 | Indian Harbour Beach, United States | Futures | Clay | (Romania) Gabriel Moraru | (France) Antoine Benneteau (Russia) Artem Ilyushin | 7–6^{(8–6)}, 3–6, [10–7] |
| Loss | 1–1 | Aug 2011 | Cluj-Napoca, Romania | Futures | Hard | (Romania) Gabriel Moraru | (Romania) Victor-Mugurel Anagnastopol (Romania) Florin Mergea | 3–6, 7–5, [1–10] |
| Loss | 1–2 | Aug 2014 | Mediaș, Romania | Futures | Clay | (Romania) Lucian Gheorghe | (Czech Republic) Libor Salaba (Czech Republic) Jan Šátral | 3–6, 4–6 |
