= Tennis at the 2011 SEA Games =

- Date: 13–21 November 2011
- Edition: 26th
- Location: Jakabaring Sport Complex, Palembang

Champions

Men's singles
- (Indonesia) Christopher Rungkat

Women's singles
- (Indonesia) Ayu Fani Damayanti

Men's doubles
- (Indonesia) Christopher Rungkat / Elbert Sie

Women's doubles
- (Thailand) Noppawan Lertcheewakarn / Nungnadda Wannasuk

Mixed doubles
- (Philippines) Denise Dy / Treat Huey

Men's team
- Indonesia

Women's team
- Thailand
← 2009 ·	SEA Games	· 2015 →

The tennis tournament at the 2011 SEA Games was held from November 13 to November 21 at the Jakabaring Sport Complex in Palembang in Indonesia. It was the 26th edition of tennis event at the SEA Games.

== Medal summary ==
* Host nation (Indonesia)

Rank	Nation	Gold	Silver	Bronze	Total
1	Indonesia (INA)*	4	2	3	9
2	Thailand (THA)	2	3	4	9
3	Philippines (PHI)	1	2	3	6
4	Vietnam (VIE)	0	0	3	3
5	Cambodia (CAM)	0	0	1	1
Totals (5 entries)		7	7	14	28

== Medalists ==
Event	Gold	Silver	Bronze
Men's singles	Christopher Rungkat; Indonesia	Danai Udomchoke; Thailand	Elbert Sie; Indonesia
Men's singles	Christopher Rungkat; Indonesia	Danai Udomchoke; Thailand	Cecil Mamiit; Philippines
Women's singles	Ayu Fani Damayanti; Indonesia	Noppawan Lertcheewakarn; Thailand	Anna Clarice Patrimonio; Philippines
Women's singles	Ayu Fani Damayanti; Indonesia	Noppawan Lertcheewakarn; Thailand	Nicha Lertpitaksinchai; Thailand
Men's doubles	Indonesia; Christopher Rungkat; Elbert Sie	Philippines; Treat Huey; Cecil Mamiit	Vietnam; Đỗ Minh Quân; Ngo Huang Huy
Men's doubles	Indonesia; Christopher Rungkat; Elbert Sie	Philippines; Treat Huey; Cecil Mamiit	Thailand; Danai Udomchoke; Kittipong Wachiramanowong
Women's doubles	Thailand; Noppawan Lertcheewakarn; Nungnadda Wannasuk	Thailand; Nicha Lertpitaksinchai; Varatchaya Wongteanchai	Indonesia; Ayu Fani Damayanti; Jessy Rompies
Women's doubles	Thailand; Noppawan Lertcheewakarn; Nungnadda Wannasuk	Thailand; Nicha Lertpitaksinchai; Varatchaya Wongteanchai	Vietnam; Huỳnh Phương Đài Trang; Trần Thị Tâm Hảo
Mixed doubles	Philippines; Denise Dy; Treat Huey	Indonesia; Jessy Rompies; Christopher Rungkat	Indonesia; Grace Sari Ysidora; Aditya Hari Sasongko
Mixed doubles	Philippines; Denise Dy; Treat Huey	Indonesia; Jessy Rompies; Christopher Rungkat	Thailand; Nungnadda Wannasuk; Sanchai Ratiwatana
Men's team	Indonesia; Christopher Rungkat; Elbert Sie; Aditya Hari Sasongko; David Agung Susanto	Philippines; Cecil Mamiit; Jeson Patrombon; Treat Huey	Thailand; Danai Udomchoke; Kittipong Wachiramanowong; Sanchai Ratiwatana; Sonchat Ratiwatana
Men's team	Indonesia; Christopher Rungkat; Elbert Sie; Aditya Hari Sasongko; David Agung Susanto	Philippines; Cecil Mamiit; Jeson Patrombon; Treat Huey	Cambodia; Orn Sambath; Kenny Bun; Long Samneang
Women's team	Thailand; Noppawan Lertcheewakarn; Nungnadda Wannasuk; Nicha Lertpitaksinchai; Varatchaya Wongteanchai	Indonesia; Ayu Fani Damayanti; Lavinia Tananta; Grace Sari Ysidora; Jessy Rompies	Vietnam; Trần Lam Anh; Huỳnh Phương Đài Trang; Phan Thị Thanh Bình
Women's team	Thailand; Noppawan Lertcheewakarn; Nungnadda Wannasuk; Nicha Lertpitaksinchai; Varatchaya Wongteanchai	Indonesia; Ayu Fani Damayanti; Lavinia Tananta; Grace Sari Ysidora; Jessy Rompies	Philippines; Anna Clarice Patrimonio; Denise Dy; Marian Capadocia
