= 2011 Malaysian Open – Singles qualifying =

This article displays the qualifying draw of the 2011 Malaysian Open.

== Players ==
=== Seeds ===
1. (Luxembourg) Anne Kremer (qualified)
2. (Turkey) Çağla Büyükakçay (first round)
3. (Japan) Erika Sema (first round)
4. (Slovakia) Kristína Kučová (qualifying competition)
5. (China) Lu Jingjing (qualified)
6. (Poland) Urszula Radwańska (withdrew, moved to the main draw)
7. (Ukraine) Tetiana Luzhanska (qualified)
8. (Thailand) Nudnida Luangnam (qualifying competition)
9. (Hong Kong) Zhang Ling (second round)

=== Qualifiers ===
1. (Luxembourg) Anne Kremer
2. (China) Lu Jingjing
3. (China) Sun Shengnan
4. (Ukraine) Tetiana Luzhanska

== Qualifying draw ==
=== First qualifier ===
First round
1	(Luxembourg) Anne Kremer	6	6
WC	(Germany) Vanessa Henke	2	2
(Ukraine) Veronika Kapshay	3	2
(Kyrgyzstan) Ksenia Palkina	6	6
(China) Xu Yifan	4	4
(Kazakhstan) Galina Voskoboeva	6	6
WC	(China) Liu Wanting	0	0
9	(Hong Kong) Zhang Ling	6	6

Second round
1	(Luxembourg) Anne Kremer	6	6
(Kyrgyzstan) Ksenia Palkina	4	1
(Kazakhstan) Galina Voskoboeva	6	6
9	(Hong Kong) Zhang Ling	2	4

Qualifying competition
1	(Luxembourg) Anne Kremer	4	7	6
(Kazakhstan) Galina Voskoboeva	6	6^{5}	3

=== Second qualifier ===
First round
2	(Turkey) Çağla Büyükakçay	6	6^{4}	2
(Australia) Jessica Moore	0	7	6
(Japan) Tomoko Yonemura	7	6
(Japan) Shuko Aoyama	5	3
(South Korea) Kim So-jung	6	6
(Japan) Akiko Yonemura	2	3
WC	(Vietnam) Huỳnh Phương Đài Trang	2	3
5	(China) Lu Jingjing	6	6

Second round
(Australia) Jessica Moore	7	6
(Japan) Tomoko Yonemura	5	4
(South Korea) Kim So-jung	2	6	1
5	(China) Lu Jingjing	6	3	6

Qualifying competition
(Australia) Jessica Moore	2	3
5	(China) Lu Jingjing	6	6

=== Third qualifier ===
First round
3	(Japan) Erika Sema	6	3	1
(China) Sun Shengnan	1	6	6
(Indonesia) Jessy Rompies	0	3
(Indonesia) Lavinia Tananta	6	6
(Japan) Aiko Nakamura	6	4	6^{3}
(Austria) Nikola Hofmanova	2	6	7
(Ukraine) Maryna Zanevska	4	6	4
8	(Thailand) Nudnida Luangnam	6	3	6

Second round
(China) Sun Shengnan	7	6
(Indonesia) Lavinia Tananta	5	3
(Austria) Nikola Hofmanova	6^{5}	6	1
8	(Thailand) Nudnida Luangnam	7	3	6

Qualifying competition
(China) Sun Shengnan	6	7
8	(Thailand) Nudnida Luangnam	4	5

=== Fourth qualifier ===
First round
4	(Slovakia) Kristína Kučová	7	7
(New Zealand) Sacha Jones	6^{2}	5
(Croatia) Jasmina Tinjić	6	6
WC	(Thailand) Nicha Lertpitaksinchai	2	1
(Chinese Taipei) Chan Chin-wei	6	6
WC	(China) Zheng Saisai	2	0
WC	(Malaysia) Theiviya Selvarajoo	1	1
7	(Ukraine) Tetiana Luzhanska	6	6

Second round
4	(Slovakia) Kristína Kučová	4
(Croatia) Jasmina Tinjić	3^{r}
(Chinese Taipei) Chan Chin-wei	1	2
7	(Ukraine) Tetiana Luzhanska	6	6

Qualifying competition
4	(Slovakia) Kristína Kučová	6	2	2
7	(Ukraine) Tetiana Luzhanska	3	6	6
