= Tennis at the 2011 SEA Games – Women's doubles =

Women's doubles
- Tennis at the 2011 SEA Games

Final
- Champion: (Thailand) Noppawan Lertcheewakarn (Thailand) Nungnadda Wannasuk
- Runner-up: (Thailand) Nicha Lertpitaksinchai (Thailand) Varatchaya Wongteanchai
- Score: 6–3, 6–2

Events
Singles	men	women
Doubles	men	women	mixed
Team	men	women
- SEA Games

Tamarine Tanasugarn and Varatchaya Wongteanchai are the defending champions of the Women's Doubles competition of the 2011 Southeast Asian Games. Tanasugarn decided not to participate and Wongteanchai partnered with Nicha Lertpitaksinchai. Second seed Noppawan Lertcheewakarn and Nungnadda Wannasuk won the title by beating Wongteanchai and Lertpitaksinchai 6–3, 6–2 in the final.

== Medalists ==
Event	Gold	Silver	Bronze
Women's Doubles	Thailand Noppawan Lertcheewakarn; Nungnadda Wannasuk	Thailand Nicha Lertpitaksinchai; Varatchaya Wongteanchai	Indonesia Ayu-Fani Damayanti; Jessy Rompies
Women's Doubles	Thailand Noppawan Lertcheewakarn; Nungnadda Wannasuk	Thailand Nicha Lertpitaksinchai; Varatchaya Wongteanchai	Vietnam Huynh Phuong Dai; Tran Thi Tam Hao

== Draw ==
=== Seeds ===
All seeds received bye to the quarterfinals.

1. (Indonesia) Ayu-Fani Damayanti / (Indonesia) Jessy Rompies (semifinals)
2. (Thailand) Noppawan Lertcheewakarn / (Thailand) Nungnadda Wannasuk (champion)
3. (Indonesia) Lavinia Tananta / (Indonesia) Grace Sari Ysidora (quarterfinals)
4. (Thailand) Nicha Lertpitaksinchai / (Thailand) Varatchaya Wongteanchai (final)

=== Main draw ===
First round
(Myanmar) Thandar Aung (Myanmar) Su Wai Phyo	2	0
(Philippines) Denise Dy (Philippines) Anna Clarice Patrimonio	6	6

Quarterfinals
1	(Indonesia) Ayu-Fani Damayanti (Indonesia) Jessy Rompies	6	5	[12]
(Philippines) Denise Dy (Philippines) Anna Clarice Patrimonio	4	7	[10]
4	(Thailand) Nicha Lertpitaksinchai (Thailand) Varatchaya Wongteanchai	6	6
(Vietnam) Phan Thi Tanh Bin (Vietnam) Tram Lan Anh	1	0
(Vietnam) Huynh Phuong Dai (Vietnam) Tran Thi Tam Hao	6	1	[10]
3	(Indonesia) Lavinia Tananta (Indonesia) Grace Sari Ysidora	3	6	[7]
(Myanmar) Zinmar Htwe (Myanmar) Nilar Win	0	2
2	(Thailand) Noppawan Lertcheewakarn (Thailand) Nungnadda Wannasuk	6	6

Semifinals
1	(Indonesia) Ayu-Fani Damayanti (Indonesia) Jessy Rompies	3	6	[7]
4	(Thailand) Nicha Lertpitaksinchai (Thailand) Varatchaya Wongteanchai	6	3	[10]
(Vietnam) Huynh Phuong Dai (Vietnam) Tran Thi Tam Hao	2	4
2	(Thailand) Noppawan Lertcheewakarn (Thailand) Nungnadda Wannasuk	6	6

Gold Medal Match
4	(Thailand) Nicha Lertpitaksinchai (Thailand) Varatchaya Wongteanchai	3	2
2	(Thailand) Noppawan Lertcheewakarn (Thailand) Nungnadda Wannasuk	6	6
