= Tennis at the 2011 SEA Games – Women's singles =

Women's singles
- Tennis at the 2011 SEA Games

Final
- Champion: (Indonesia) Ayu-Fani Damayanti
- Runner-up: (Thailand) Noppawan Lertcheewakarn
- Score: 6–4, 6–1

Events
Singles	men	women
Doubles	men	women	mixed
Team	men	women
- SEA Games

Lavinia Tananta is the defending champion of the Women's Singles competition of the 2011 SEA Games but lost to Anna Clarice Patrimonio in the quarterfinals. Ayu-Fani Damayanti won the title after beating top seed Noppawan Lertcheewakarn in the final by 6–4, 6–1.

== Medalists ==
Event	Gold	Silver	Bronze
Women's Singles	Indonesia Ayu-Fani Damayanti	Thailand Noppawan Lertcheewakarn	Philippines Anna Clarice Patrimonio
Women's Singles	Indonesia Ayu-Fani Damayanti	Thailand Noppawan Lertcheewakarn	Thailand Nicha Lertpitaksinchai

== Draw ==
=== Seeds ===
All the four seeds received byes to the quarterfinals.

1. (Thailand) Noppawan Lertcheewakarn (final)
2. (Indonesia) Ayu-Fani Damayanti (champion)
3. (Thailand) Nicha Lertpitaksinchai (semifinals)
4. (Indonesia) Lavinia Tananta (quarterfinals)

=== Main draw ===
First round
(Vietnam) Huynh Phuong Dai Trang	7	6
(Myanmar) Nilar Win	6	3
(Philippines) Anna Clarice Patrimonio	6	6
(Malaysia) Jawairiah Noordin	4	3
(Cambodia) Ka Andrea Daravy	6	6
(Philippines) Marian Capadocia	2	4
(Vietnam) Tran Lam Anh	2	3
(Myanmar) Thandar Aung	6	6

Quarterfinals
1	(Thailand) Noppawan Lertcheewakarn	6	6
(Vietnam) Huynh Phuong Dai Trang	0	3
4	(Indonesia) Lavinia Tananta	4	1
(Philippines) Anna Clarice Patrimonio	6	6
(Cambodia) Ka Andrea Daravy	3	3
3	(Thailand) Nicha Lertpitaksinchai	6	6
(Myanmar) Thandar Aung	0	0
2	(Indonesia) Ayu-Fani Damayanti	6	6

Semifinals
1	(Thailand) Noppawan Lertcheewakarn	7	6
(Philippines) Anna Clarice Patrimonio	5	1
3	(Thailand) Nicha Lertpitaksinchai	0	3
2	(Indonesia) Ayu-Fani Damayanti	6	6

Gold Medal Match
1	(Thailand) Noppawan Lertcheewakarn	4	1
2	(Indonesia) Ayu-Fani Damayanti	6	6
