= Tennis at the 2011 SEA Games – Women's team =

Women's team
- Tennis at the 2011 SEA Games

Final
- Champion: Thailand
- Runner-up: Indonesia
- Score: 3–0

Events
Singles	men	women
Doubles	men	women	mixed
Team	men	women
- SEA Games

Thailand were the defending champions of the Men's Team competition of the 2011 SEA Games and successfully defended their title by defeating Indonesia in the final. Each tie was the best of three rubbers, two singles and one doubles match.

== Medalists ==
Event	Gold	Silver	Bronze
Women's Team	Thailand Noppawan Lertcheewakarn; Nungnadda Wannasuk; Nicha Lertpitaksinchai; Varatchaya Wongteanchai	Indonesia Ayu-Fani Damayanti; Lavinia Tananta; Grace Sari Ysidora; Jessy Rompies	Vietnam Tran Lam Anh; Huỳnh Phương Đài Trang; Phan Thi Thanh Binh
Women's Team	Thailand Noppawan Lertcheewakarn; Nungnadda Wannasuk; Nicha Lertpitaksinchai; Varatchaya Wongteanchai	Indonesia Ayu-Fani Damayanti; Lavinia Tananta; Grace Sari Ysidora; Jessy Rompies	Philippines Anna Clarice Patrimonio; Denise Dy; Marian Jade Capadocia

== Draw ==
Quarterfinals; 13 November
Thailand
Bye
Bye
Vietnam
Philippines	3
Myanmar	0
BYE
Indonesia

Semifinals; 14 November
Thailand	3
Vietnam	0
Philippines	0
Indonesia	3

Final; 15 November
Thailand	3
Indonesia	0

=== Quarterfinals ===
Philippines
3
Jakabaring Sport Complex, Palembang
November 13, 2011
Hard (Outdoors)

Myanmar
0

			1	2	3
1	(Philippines) (Myanmar)	Anna Clarice Patrimonio; Thandar Aung	6; 4	7; 5
2	(Philippines) (Myanmar)	Denise Dy; Nilar Win	6; 0	6; 4
3	(Philippines) (Myanmar)	Marian Jade Capadocia / Denise Dy; Zinmar Htwe / Su Wai Phyo	6; 3	6; 2

=== Semifinals ===
Thailand
3
Jakabaring Sport Complex, Palembang
November 14, 2011
Hard (Outdoors)

Vietnam
0

			1	2	3
1	(Thailand) (Vietnam)	Nungnadda Wannasuk; Tran Lam Anh	6; 3	6; 2
2	(Thailand) (Vietnam)	Nicha Lertpitaksinchai; Huynh Phuong Dai Trang	6; 4	6; 2
3	(Thailand) (Vietnam)	Noppawan Lertcheewakarn / Varatchaya Wongteanchai; Huynh Phuong Dai Trang / Phan Thi Thanh Binh	6; 4	6; 0

Philippines
0
Jakabaring Sport Complex, Palembang
November 14, 2011
Hard (Outdoors)

Indonesia
3

			1	2	3
1	(Philippines) (Indonesia)	Anna Clarice Patrimonio; Ayu-Fani Damayanti	3; 6	5; 7
2	(Philippines) (Indonesia)	Denise Dy; Lavinia Tananta	3; 6	2; 6
3	(Philippines) (Indonesia)	Marian Jade Capadocia / Denise Dy; Grace Sari Ysidora / Jessy Rompies	4; 6	3; 6

=== Gold medal match ===
Thailand
3
Jakabaring Sport Complex, Palembang
November 15, 2011
Hard (Outdoors)

Indonesia
0

			1	2	3
1	(Thailand) (Indonesia)	Nungnadda Wannasuk; Lavinia Tananta	7^{7} 6^{4}	6; 2
2	(Thailand) (Indonesia)	Noppawan Lertcheewakarn; Ayu-Fani Damayanti	2; 6	6; 3	7; 5
3	(Thailand) (Indonesia)	Nicha Lertpitaksinchai / Varatchaya Wongteanchai; Ayu-Fani Damayanti / Jessy Rompies
