= 2008 Garuda Indonesia Tennis Masters =

The 2008 Garuda Indonesia Tennis Masters was a tennis tournament held at the Hotel Sultan in Jakarta from 10 December to 14 December 2008. It was the inaugural Garuda Indonesia Tennis Masters.

The tournament was restricted to Indonesian entrants. The total prize purse was 500 million rupiah (roughly $40,000US), with 100 million rupiah for the winners of the singles competition.

The singles competitions each had eight entrants. The men's doubles competition had eight teams, and the women's doubles competition had four teams.

The Indonesian Tennis Association (PELTI) used the Masters to rank Indonesian players, for Fed Cup and Davis Cup selection.

== Results ==
=== Men's singles ===
Christopher Rungkat defeated Nesa Arta 6-2 6-0

=== Men's doubles ===
Christopher Rungkat/Andrian Raturandang defeated Nesa Arta/Hendri Susilo Pramono 6-4 7-5

=== Women's singles ===
Lavinia Tananta defeated Ayu-Fani Damayanti 6-4 7-5

=== Women's doubles ===
Ayu-Fani Damayanti/Liza Andriyani defeated Grace Sari Ysidora/Septi Mende 6-1 6-4
