= Poojashree Venkatesha =

Indian tennis player

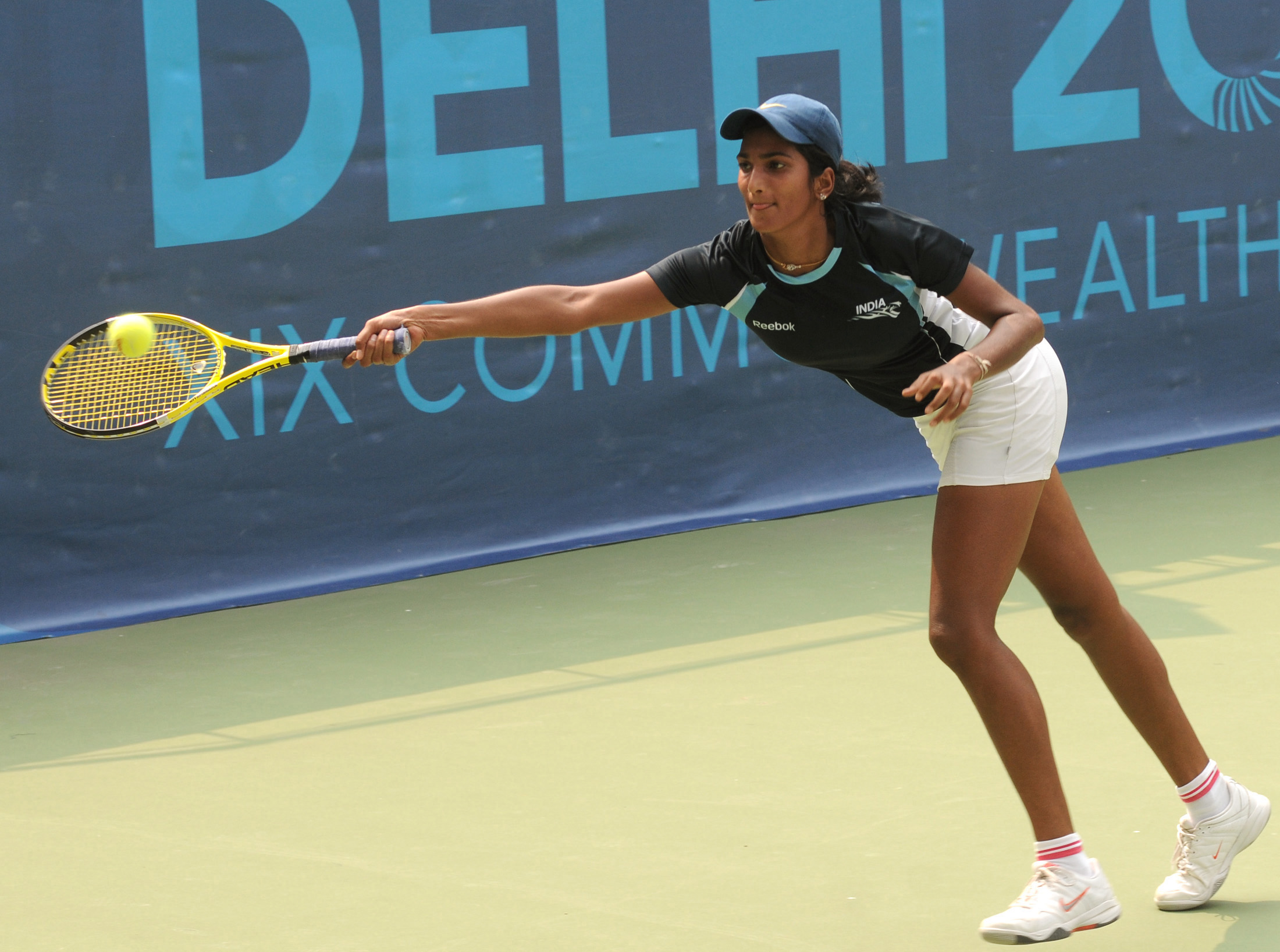
- Poojashree Venkatesha in action against Heather Watson in XIX Commonwealth Games (Khanna Tennis Stadium, Delhi, 6 October 2010)
- Country (sports): India
- Residence: Mysore, India
- Born: 27 July 1990 (age 36) Mandya, India
- Height: 1.83 m (6 ft 0 in)
- Turned pro: 2006
- Plays: Right-handed (two-handed backhand)
- Prize money: $34,906

Singles
- Career record: 95–59
- Career titles: 5 ITF
- Highest ranking: No. 306 (30 November 2009)

Doubles
- Career record: 81–48
- Career titles: 9 ITF
- Highest ranking: No. 371 (28 February 2011)

Poojashree Venkatesha
Medal record

Women's Tennis

Representing India

Commonwealth Youth Games
Silver medal – second place	2008 Pune	Women's singles

Poojashree Venkatesha (born 27 July 1990) is an Indian former tennis player, primarily competing on the ITF Women's Circuit. She won a silver medal in the women's singles event at the 2008 Commonwealth Youth Games.

== Career ==
=== 2008 ===
Venkatesha and won the silver medal as the runner-up at the 2008 Commonwealth Youth Games. In the final, she was beaten by Heather Watson of Great Britain 6–2, 6–1.

=== 2010 ===
At the 2010 Commonwealth Games, Venkatesha missed out on the bronze medal along with India's Nirupama Sanjeev for the women's doubles, defeated by Sania Mirza and Rushmi Chakravarthi of India, 6–4, 6–2.

== ITF Circuit finals ==
$25,000 tournaments
$10,000 tournaments

=== Singles: 7 (5–2) ===
Result	No.	Date	Location	Surface	Opponent	Score
Win	1.	24 November 2008	Islamabad, Pakistan	Clay	(South Korea) Kim Hae-sung	7–6^{(8–10)}, 6–4
Loss	1.	18 April 2009	Shymkent, Kazakhstan	Clay	(Uzbekistan) Albina Khabibulina	7–6^{(7–5)}, 3–6, 1–6
Win	2.	10 August 2009	New Delhi, India	Hard	(United Kingdom) Emily Webley-Smith	7–6^{(10–8)}, 6–2
Win	3.	7 September 2009	Bangalore, India	Hard	(Slovenia) Dalila Jakupović	6–3, 6–3
Win	4.	21 September 2009	Dehradun, India	Hard	(India) Rushmi Chakravarthi	6–3, 7–5
Win	5.	5 October 2009	Noida, India	Hard	(Japan) Moe Kawatoko	6–4, 6–0
Loss	2.	17 May 2010	Durban, South Africa	Hard	(South Africa) Chanel Simmonds	1–6, 4–6

=== Doubles: 16 (9–7) ===
Result	No.	Date	Tournament	Surface	Partner	Opponents	Score
Win	1.	28 April 2008	Cochin, India	Clay	(India) Rushmi Chakravarthi	(India) Archana Venkataraman (India) Geeta Manohar	6–1, 7–5
Loss	1.	5 May 2008	Trivandrum, India	Clay	(Georgia (country)) Magda Okruashvili	(Japan) Miki Miyamura (South Korea) Yu Min-hwa	6–7^{(6–8)}, 2–6
Loss	2.	24 November 2008	Islamabad, Pakistan	Clay	(India) Treta Bhattacharyya	(South Korea) Kim Hae-sung (South Korea) Shin Jung-yoon	1–6, 3–6
Loss	3.	1 December 2008	Islamabad, Pakistan	Hard	(India) Parul Goswami	(South Korea) Kim Hae-sung (South Korea) Shin Jung-yoon	4–6, 6–7^{(2–7)}
Win	2.	26 January 2009	Hyderabad, India	Clay	(India) Parija Maloo	(India) Shivika Burman (India) Kumari-Sweta Solanki	6–1, 6–2
Win	3.	10 August 2009	New Delhi, India	Hard	(India) Sanaa Bhambri	(India) Rishika Sunkara (India) Nova Patel	6–2, 6–1
Win	4.	7 September 2009	Bangalore, India	Hard	(India) Isha Lakhani	(India) Kumari-Sweta Solanki (Japan) Moe Kawatoko	6–4, 6–3
Loss	4.	21 September 2009	Dehradun, India	Hard	(Israel) Keren Shlomo	(Japan) Miki Miyamura (Japan) Moe Kawatoko	1–6, 3–6
Loss	5.	5 October 2009	Noida, India	Hard	(India) Sanaa Bhambri	(Japan) Miki Miyamura (Japan) Moe Kawatoko	1–6, 6–4, [5–10]
Win	5.	12 July 2010	Hatyai, Thailand	Hard	(India) Rushmi Chakravarthi	(Indonesia) Ayu-Fani Damayanti (Indonesia) Lavinia Tananta	6–3, 7–6^{(12–10)}
Win	6.	26 July 2010	Jakarta, Indonesia	Hard	(Indonesia) Jessy Rompies	(Japan) Yumi Miyazaki (Japan) Tomoko Taira	6–2, 7–5
Runner-up	6.	4 December 2010	Mandya, India	Hard	(India) Rushmi Chakravarthi	(Thailand) Peangtarn Plipuech (Thailand) Nungnadda Wannasuk	1–6, 1–6
Win	7.	21 January 2011	Muzaffarnagar, India	Grass	(India) Rushmi Chakravarthi	(Japan) Mari Tanaka (Japan) Miki Miyamura	3–6, 6–4, 6–4
Loss	7.	28 January 2011	Kolkata, India	Clay	(India) Ankita Raina	(Italy) Nicole Clerico (Slovenia) Dalila Jakupović	3–6, 1–6
Win	8.	16 December 2011	Djibouti City	Hard	(Russia) Alexandra Romanova	(Russia) Diana Isaeva (Russia) Anna Morgina	6–1, 6–0
Win	9.	23 December 2011	Djibouti City	Hard	(Russia) Alexandra Romanova	(Russia) Diana Isaeva (Russia) Margarita Lazareva	7–5, 7–6^{(10–8)}
