= Tennis at the 2011 SEA Games – Men's doubles =

Men's doubles
- Tennis at the 2011 SEA Games

Final
- Champion: (Indonesia) Christopher Rungkat (Indonesia) Elbert Sie
- Runner-up: (Philippines) Treat Conrad Huey (Philippines) Cecil Mamiit
- Score: 2–6, 6–2, [10–7]

Events
Singles	men	women
Doubles	men	women	mixed
Team	men	women
- SEA Games

Sonchat Ratiwatana and Sanchai Ratiwatana were the defending champions of the Men's Doubles competition of the 2011 SEA Games but lost to Do Minh Quan and Ngo Huang Huy in the quarterfinals. Christopher Rungkat and Elbert Sie won the title by beating Treat Conrad Huey and Cecil Mamiit 2–6, 6–2, [10–7] in the final.

== Medalists ==
Event	Gold	Silver	Bronze
Men's Doubles	Indonesia Christopher Rungkat; Elbert Sie	Philippines Treat Conrad Huey; Cecil Mamiit	Vietnam Do Minh Quan; Ngo Huang Huy
Men's Doubles	Indonesia Christopher Rungkat; Elbert Sie	Philippines Treat Conrad Huey; Cecil Mamiit	Thailand Danai Udomchoke; Kittipong Wachiramanowong

== Draw ==
=== Seeds ===
All seeds received bye to the quarterfinals.

1. (Thailand) Sanchai Ratiwatana / (Thailand) Sonchat Ratiwatana (quarterfinals)
2. (Thailand) Danai Udomchoke / (Thailand) Kittipong Wachiramanowong (semifinals)
3. (Indonesia) Christopher Rungkat / (Indonesia) Elbert Sie (champion)
4. (Indonesia) Aditya Hari Sasongko / (Indonesia) David Agung Susanto (quarterfinals)

=== Main draw ===
First round
(Philippines) Treat Conrad Huey (Philippines) Cecil Mamiit	6	6
(Myanmar) Zin Bo (Myanmar) Aung Kyaw Naing	0	0
(Cambodia) Long Samneang (Cambodia) Orn Sambath	3	5
(Laos) Keodalasouk D (Laos) Lasavady Vitata	6	7
(Philippines) Johnny Arcilla (Philippines) Jeson Petrombon	6	6
(Myanmar) Aung Ko Oo (Myanmar) Phyo Min Thar	1	1

Quarterfinals
1	(Thailand) Sanchai Ratiwatana (Thailand) Sonchat Ratiwatana	6	4	[6]
(Vietnam) Do Minh Quan (Vietnam) Ngo Huang Huy	1	6	[10]
4	(Indonesia) Aditya Hari Sasongko (Indonesia) David Agung Susanto	6	5	[6]
(Philippines) Treat Conrad Huey (Philippines) Cecil Mamiit	2	7	[10]
(Laos) Keodalasouk D (Laos) Lasavady Vitata	0	0
3	(Indonesia) Christopher Rungkat (Indonesia) Elbert Sie	6	6
(Philippines) Johnny Arcilla (Philippines) Jeson Petrombon	2	2
2	(Thailand) Danai Udomchoke (Thailand) Kittipong Wachiramanowong	6	6

Semifinals
(Vietnam) Do Minh Quan (Vietnam) Ngo Huang Huy	0	6	[2]
(Philippines) Treat Conrad Huey (Philippines) Cecil Mamiit	6	4	[10]
3	(Indonesia) Christopher Rungkat (Indonesia) Elbert Sie	3	7	[10]
2	(Thailand) Danai Udomchoke (Thailand) Kittipong Wachiramanowong	6	5	[8]

Gold Medal Match
(Philippines) Treat Conrad Huey (Philippines) Cecil Mamiit	6	2	[7]
3	(Indonesia) Christopher Rungkat (Indonesia) Elbert Sie	2	6	[10]
