= Juan Ting-fei =

Taiwanese tennis player

Juan Ting-fei 阮婷妃
- Country (sports): Chinese Taipei
- Born: 28 August 1992 (age 33)
- Retired: 2015
- Plays: Right (two-handed backhand)
- Prize money: $24,694

Singles
- Career record: 74–69
- Career titles: 2 ITF
- Highest ranking: No. 455 (21 May 2012)

Grand Slam singles results
- Australian Open Junior: 2R (2010)
- US Open Junior: 1R (2009)

Doubles
- Career record: 51–51
- Career titles: 2 ITF
- Highest ranking: No. 580 (29 April 2013)

Grand Slam doubles results
- Australian Open Junior: 1R (2009, 2010)
- US Open Junior: 1R (2009)

Team competitions
- Fed Cup: 1–7

Juan Ting-fei
- Traditional Chinese: 阮婷妃
- Simplified Chinese: 阮婷妃
Transcriptions
Standard Mandarin
- Hanyu Pinyin: Ruǎn Tíngfēi

Juan Ting-fei (Chinese: 阮婷妃; born 28 August 1992) is a former tennis player from Taiwan.

She has career-high WTA rankings of 455 in singles, achieved on 21 May 2012, and 580 in doubles, reached on 29 April 2013. Juan won two singles titles and two doubles titles on the ITF Circuit.

Playing for Chinese Taipei Fed Cup team, Juan has a win–loss record of 1–7.

== ITF finals ==
Legend
$25,000 tournaments
$10,000 tournaments

=== Singles (2–0) ===
Result	No.	Date	Tournament	Surface	Opponent	Score
Win	1.	Jun 2011	ITF Taipei, Taiwan	Hard	(Chinese Taipei) Lee Ya-hsuan	6–4, 7–6^{(1)}
Win	2.	Dec 2012	ITF Jakarta, Indonesia	Hard	(Chinese Taipei) Hsu Ching-wen	6–3, 6–2

=== Doubles (2–6) ===
Result	No.	Date	Tournament	Surface	Partner	Opponents	Score
Loss	1.	Nov 2008	ITF Manila, Philippines	Hard	(China) Yi Zhong	(Indonesia) Ayu Fani Damayanti (Indonesia) Jessy Rompies	6–7^{(2)}, 3–6
Win	2.	Jun 2009	ITF Pattaya, Thailand	Hard	(Chinese Taipei) Hwang I-hsuan	(Indonesia) Ayu Fani Damayanti (Indonesia) Lavinia Tananta	6–4, 6–2
Loss	3.	Oct 2010	ITF Pattaya, Thailand	Hard	(China) Zhu Lin	(Chinese Taipei) Chen Yi (Thailand) Varatchaya Wongteanchai	5–7, 2–6
Loss	4.	Oct 2010	ITF Taipei, Taiwan	Hard	(China) Zheng Saisai	(Chinese Taipei) Kao Shao-yuan (China) Wang Qiang	3–6, 6–7^{(2)}
Loss	5.	Jun 2011	ITF Taipei, Taiwan	Hard	(Chinese Taipei) Hsieh Yu-chieh	(Chinese Taipei) Chan Chin-wei (Chinese Taipei) Kao Shao-yuan	1–6, 5–7
Loss	6.	Sep 2012	ITF Antalya, Turkey	Hard	(Ukraine) Olena Kyrpot	(Japan) Yurina Koshino (Japan) Kanami Tsuji	5–7, 2–6
Loss	7.	Dec 2012	ITF Jakarta, Indonesia	Hard	(Japan) Yuka Higuchi	(South Korea) Choi Ji-hee (Japan) Akari Inoue	3–6, 4–6
Win	8.	Apr 2013	ITF Sharm El Sheikh, Egypt	Hard	(Russia) Yuliya Kalabina	(Czech Republic) Nikola Fraňková (Germany) Michaela Frlicka	6–3, 6–4
