= Ayu Fani Damayanti =

Indonesian tennis player

- Country (sports): Indonesia
- Residence: Denpasar, Indonesia
- Born: 29 November 1988 (age 37) Denpasar, Indonesia
- Height: 1.62 m (5 ft 4 in)
- Turned pro: 2003
- Plays: Right-handed (two-handed backhand)
- Prize money: $91,437

Singles
- Career record: 203–98
- Career titles: 12 ITF
- Highest ranking: No. 216 (7 May 2012)

Doubles
- Career record: 175–74
- Career titles: 19 ITF
- Highest ranking: No. 201 (14 May 2012)
Medal record
Women's Tennis
Representing Indonesia
Southeast Asian Games
Gold medal – first place	2005 Manila	Team
Gold medal – first place	2011 Jakarta-Palembang	Singles
Silver medal – second place	2005 Manila	Doubles
Silver medal – second place	2009 Vientiane	Singles
Silver medal – second place	2009 Vientiane	Team
Silver medal – second place	2011 Jakarta-Palembang	Team
Bronze medal – third place	2011 Jakarta-Palembang	Doubles
Bronze medal – third place	2015 Singapore	Team

Ayu Fani Damayanti (born 29 November 1988) is a former Indonesian tennis player. She made her debut as a professional in 2003, aged 14, at an ITF tournament in Jakarta.

Her greatest success came in doubles competitions, especially with Septi Mende as partner. The pair won five doubles titles on the ITF Women's Circuit, and the silver medal in doubles at the Southeast Asian Games in 2005. She won seven medals in total at the SEA Games from 2005 to 2015, including gold in the women's singles at the 2011 Southeast Asian Games in Palembang.

Damayanti was part of Indonesia Fed Cup team several times between 2005 and 2015. She was part of Indonesia's successful World Group II play-off against Puerto Rico in 2005. She and her partner Wynne Prakusya defeated the Puerto Rican pair in straight sets.

In 2008, Damayanti reached the final of the women's singles at the inaugural Garuda Indonesia Tennis Masters. She was defeated by Lavinia Tananta. However, she and partner Liza Andriyani won the women's doubles.

== ITF finals ==
=== Singles (12–10) ===
$100,000 tournaments
$75,000 tournaments
$50,000 tournaments
$25,000 tournaments
$10,000 tournaments

Result	No.	Date	Tournament	Surface	Opponent	Score
Loss	1.	8 November 2004	Manila, Philippines	Clay	(South Korea) Lee Ye-ra	0–6, 0–1 ret.
Loss	2.	6 December 2004	Jakarta, Indonesia	Hard	(Indonesia) Sandy Gumulya	3–6, 0–6
Win	1.	25 April 2005	Jakarta, Indonesia	Hard	(Thailand) Nudnida Luangnam	6–3, 6–0
Win	2.	2 May 2006	Jakarta, Indonesia	Hard	(Chinese Taipei) Chen Yi	6–3, 6–3
Loss	3.	16 July 2006	Bangkok, Thailand	Hard	(Hong Kong) Chan Wing-yau	4–6, 4–6
Loss	4.	18 September 2006	Jakarta, Indonesia	Hard	(Indonesia) Lavinia Tananta	7–5, 1–6, 1–6
Loss	5.	7 November 2006	Jakarta, Indonesia	Hard	(Indonesia) Romana Tedjakusuma	2–6, 1–6
Loss	6.	10 November 2008	Manila, Philippines	Hard	(Indonesia) Lavinia Tananta	1–6, 4–6
Win	3.	17 November 2008	Manila, Philippines	Hard	(New Zealand) Sacha Jones	7–6^{(7–5)}, 6–2
Win	4.	16 March 2009	Hamilton, New Zealand	Hard	(Thailand) Noppawan Lertcheewakarn	6–4, 4–6, 6–3
Win	5.	27 April 2009	Balikpapan, Indonesia	Hard	(Japan) Erika Sema	7–5, 6–3
Win	6.	8 June 2009	Bangkok, Thailand	Hard	(Germany) Sarah-Rebecca Sekulic	6–3, 6–2
Win	7.	15 June 2009	Pattaya, Thailand	Hard	(Chinese Taipei) Hwang I-hsuan	7–6^{(7–3)}, 6–4
Win	8.	27 July 2009	Jakarta, Indonesia	Hard	(Indonesia) Grace Sari Ysidora	6–4, 6–4
Loss	7.	2 May 2011	Bangkok, Thailand	Hard	(Thailand) Luksika Kumkhum	2–6, 2–6
Win	9.	28 May 2011	Bangkok, Thailand	Hard	(United States) Julia Cohen	3–6, 6–2, 6–3
Win	10.	12 June 2011	Jakarta, Indonesia	Hard	(China) Zhang Kailin	6–4, 6–3
Loss	8.	26 June 2011	Tarakan, Indonesia	Hard	(Indonesia) Jessy Rompies	1–6, 2–6
Win	11.	30 July 2011	Fergana, Uzbekistan	Hard	(Chinese Taipei) Hsieh Su-wei	6–3, 6–4
Loss	9.	9 October 2011	Palembang, Indonesia	Hard	(France) Iryna Brémond	2–6, 3–6
Loss	10.	9 December 2012	Jakarta, Indonesia	Hard	(China) Lu Jiajing	6–1, 4–6, 5–7
Win	12.	14 July 2013	Solo, Indonesia	Hard	(Japan) Yumi Miyazaki	7–5, 6–2

=== Doubles (19–14) ===
Result	No.	Date	Tournament	Surface	Partner	Opponents	Score
Win	1.	27 September 2004	Balikpapan, Indonesia	Hard	(Indonesia) Septi Mende	(Indonesia) Sandy Gumulya (Thailand) Pichittra Thongdach	6–2, 6–2
Win	2.	1 November 2004	Manila, Philippines	Hard	(Indonesia) Septi Mende	(South Korea) Kim Hae-sung (South Korea) Lee Ye-ra	7–6^{(7–2)}, 1–6, 6–0
Loss	1.	8 November 2004	Manila, Philippines	Hard	(Indonesia) Septi Mende	(Thailand) Prim Buaklee (Thailand) Nudnida Luangnam	w/o
Win	3.	13 December 2004	Jakarta, Indonesia	Hard	(Indonesia) Septi Mende	(South Korea) Yoo Mi (Russia) Julia Efremova	4–6, 6–0, 7–5
Loss	2.	4 April 2005	Wuhan, China	Hard	(Indonesia) Septi Mende	(China) Ji Chunmei (China) Yu Dan	2–6, 4–6
Loss	3.	12 April 2005	Changsha, China	Hard	(Indonesia) Septi Mende	(China) Yang Shujing (China) Yu Ying	1–6, 7–6^{(7–5)}, 2–6
Win	4.	25 April 2005	Jakarta, Indonesia	Hard	(Indonesia) Septi Mende	(Thailand) Orawan Lamangthong (Indonesia) Wukirasih Sawondari	6–1, 6–3
Win	5.	2 May 2006	Jakarta, Indonesia	Hard	(Indonesia) Septi Mende	(China) Huang Lei (China) Xie Yanze	6–4, 6–4
Win	6.	25 July 2006	Bangkok, Thailand	Hard	(Thailand) Nudnida Luangnam	(Thailand) Wilawan Choptang (Thailand) Thassha Vitayaviroj	6–2, 6–2
Loss	4.	18 September 2006	Jakarta, Indonesia	Hard	(Indonesia) Lavinia Tananta	(Thailand) Noppawan Lertcheewakarn (Thailand) Varatchaya Wongteanchai	2–6, 4–6
Loss	5.	12 November 2007	Manila, Philippines	Hard	(Indonesia) Septi Mende	(Chinese Taipei) Yi Chen (Chinese Taipei) Kao Shao-yuan	3–6, 5–7
Win	7.	5 May 2008	Tarakan, Indonesia	Hard	(Indonesia) Liza Andriyani	(Australia) Tiffany Welford (Hong Kong) Yang Zi-Jun	6–2, 6–3
Win	8.	17 November 2008	Manila, Philippines	Hard	(Indonesia) Jessy Rompies	(Chinese Taipei) Juan Ting-fei (China) Yi Zhong	7–6^{(7–2)}, 6–3
Win	9.	11 May 2009	Tanjung Selor, Indonesia	Hard	(Indonesia) Lavinia Tananta	(Indonesia) Beatrice Gumulya (Indonesia) Jessy Rompies	6–1, 6–1
Loss	6.	15 June 2009	Pattaya, Thailand	Hard	(Indonesia) Lavinia Tananta	(Chinese Taipei) Hwang I-hsuan (Chinese Taipei) Juan Ting-fei	4–6, 2–6
Win	10.	3 May 2010	Tarakan, Indonesia	Hard	(Indonesia) Lavinia Tananta	(China) Liu Wanting (Japan) Mari Tanaka	6–4, 7–5
Loss	7.	12 July 2010	Hat Yai, Thailand	Hard	(Indonesia) Lavinia Tananta	(India) Rushmi Chakravarthi (India) Poojashree Venkatesha	2–6, 6–7^{(10–12)}
Win	11.	2 August 2010	Balikpapan, Indonesia	Hard	(Indonesia) Lavinia Tananta	(Chinese Taipei) Chan Hao-ching (Chinese Taipei) Kao Shao-yuan	6–4, 7–5
Win	12.	27 September 2010	Jakarta, Indonesia	Hard	(Indonesia) Jessy Rompies	(Thailand) Peangtarn Plipuech (Indonesia) Laili Rahmawati Ulfa	6–0, 6–0
Loss	8.	11 October 2010	Mount Gambier, Australia	Hard	(Indonesia) Jessy Rompies	(Australia) Alison Bai (Brazil) Ana Clara Duarte	w/o
Loss	9.	2 May 2011	Bangkok, Thailand	Hard	(Indonesia) Lavinia Tananta	(Indonesia) Jessy Rompies (Indonesia) Grace Sari Ysidora	6–3, 4–6, [5–10]
Loss	10.	9 May 2011	Bangkok, Thailand	Hard	(Indonesia) Lavinia Tananta	(China) Li Ting (China) Zhao Yijing	7–6^{(2–7)}, 4–6, [11–13]
Loss	11.	28 May 2011	Bangkok, Thailand	Hard	(Indonesia) Lavinia Tananta	(China) Li Ting (Thailand) Varatchaya Wongteanchai	1–6, 4–6
Loss	12.	3 June 2011	Bangkok, Thailand	Hard	(Indonesia) Lavinia Tananta	(China) Li Ting (Thailand) Varatchaya Wongteanchai	7–5, 6–7^{(5–7)}, [5–10]
Win	13.	11 June 2011	Jakarta, Indonesia	Hard	(Indonesia) Lavinia Tananta	(Indonesia) Bella Destriana (Indonesia) Cynthia Melita	7–5, 6–4
Win	14.	16 September 2011	Cairns, Australia	Hard	(Indonesia) Jessy Rompies	(Brazil) Maria Fernanda Alves (United Kingdom) Samantha Murray	6–3, 6–3
Loss	13.	8 October 2011	Palembang, Indonesia	Hard	(Indonesia) Jessy Rompies	(Belgium) Tamaryn Hendler (South Africa) Chanel Simmonds	4–6, 2–6
Win	15.	7 September 2012	Rockhampton, Australia	Hard	(Indonesia) Lavinia Tananta	(Thailand) Nicha Lertpitaksinchai (Thailand) Peangtarn Plipuech	5–7, 7–6^{(7–2)}, [10–8]
Win	16.	15 September 2012	Salisbury, Australia	Hard	(Indonesia) Lavinia Tananta	(Australia) Alison Bai (Australia) Sally Peers	7–6^{(7–5)}, 6–0
Win	17.	9 December 2012	Jakarta, Indonesia	Hard	(Indonesia) Lavinia Tananta	(China) Lu Jiaxiang (China) Lu Jiajing	6–3, 6–7^{(9–11)}, [10–6]
Win	18.	28 June 2013	Bangkok, Thailand	Hard	(Indonesia) Lavinia Tananta	(Japan) Shiho Akita (Japan) Akari Inoue	1–6, 6–4, [10–6]
Win	19.	13 July 2013	Solo, Indonesia	Hard	(Indonesia) Lavinia Tananta	(Indonesia) Beatrice Gumulya (Indonesia) Jessy Rompies	4–6, 6–1, [10–5]
Loss	14.	2 September 2013	Yeongwol, South Korea	Hard	(Indonesia) Lavinia Tananta	(South Korea) Hong Seung-yeon (South Korea) Lee Hye-min	7–5, 2–6, [5–10]
