= Tennis at the 2011 SEA Games – Mixed doubles =

Mixed doubles
- Tennis at the 2011 SEA Games
- 2009 Champion: (Philippines) Denise Dy (Philippines) Treat Conrad Huey

Final
- Runner-up: (Indonesia) Jessy Rompies (Indonesia) Christopher Rungkat
- Score: 4–6, 6–3, [10–6]

Events
Singles	men	women
Doubles	men	women	mixed
Team	men	women
← 2009 ·	SEA Games	· 2015 →

Tamarine Tanasugarn and Sonchat Ratiwatana are the defending champions of the Mixed Doubles competition of the 2011 SEA Games. Tanasugarn decided not to participate. Ratiwatana partnered with Varatchaya Wongteanchai but the pair lost in the quarterfinals to Denise Dy and Treat Conrad Huey. Dy and Huey eventually won the title by beating Jessy Rompies and Christopher Rungkat 4–6, 6–3, [10–6] in the final.

== Medalists ==
Event	Gold	Silver	Bronze
Mixed Doubles	Philippines Denise Dy; Treat Conrad Huey	Indonesia Jessy Rompies; Christopher Rungkat	Indonesia Grace Sari Ysidora; Aditya Hari Sasongko
Mixed Doubles	Philippines Denise Dy; Treat Conrad Huey	Indonesia Jessy Rompies; Christopher Rungkat	Thailand Nungnadda Wannasuk; Sanchai Ratiwatana

== Draw ==
=== Seeds ===
All seeds received bye to the quarterfinals.

1. (Thailand) Varatchaya Wongteanchai / (Thailand) Sonchat Ratiwatana (quarterfinals)
2. (Thailand) Nungnadda Wannasuk / (Thailand) Sanchai Ratiwatana (semifinals)
3. (Indonesia) Jessy Rompies / (Indonesia) Christopher Rungkat (final)
4. (Indonesia) Grace Sari Ysidora / (Indonesia) Aditya Hari Sasongko (semifinals)

=== Main draw ===
First round
(Philippines) Denise Dy (Philippines) Treat Conrad Huey	6	6
(Myanmar) Zinmar Htwe (Myanmar) Aung Ko Oo	0	2
(Vietnam) Tran Lam Anh (Vietnam) Ho Huynh Dan Mac	5	3
(Cambodia) Ka Andrea Daravy (Cambodia) Kenny Bun	7	6
(Malaysia) Jawairiah Noordin (Malaysia) Si Yew Ming	6	6
(Myanmar) Thandar Aung (Myanmar) Phyo Min Thar	4	1
(Philippines) Anna Clarice Patrimonio (Philippines) Johnny Arcilla	5	2
(Vietnam) Huynh Phuong Dai (Vietnam) Ngô Quang Huy	7	6

Quarterfinals
1	(Thailand) Varatchaya Wongteanchai (Thailand) Sonchat Ratiwatana	3	2
(Philippines) Denise Dy (Philippines) Treat Conrad Huey	6	6
4	(Indonesia) Grace Sari Ysidora (Indonesia) Aditya Hari Sasongko	6	6
(Cambodia) Ka Andrea Daravy (Cambodia) Kenny Bun	3	3
(Malaysia) Jawairiah Noordin (Malaysia) Si Yew Ming	1	2
3	(Indonesia) Jessy Rompies (Indonesia) Christopher Rungkat	6	6
(Vietnam) Huynh Phuong Dai (Vietnam) Ngô Quang Huy	5	4
2	(Thailand) Nungnadda Wannasuk (Thailand) Sanchai Ratiwatana	7	6

Semifinals
(Philippines) Denise Dy (Philippines) Treat Conrad Huey	6	6
4	(Indonesia) Grace Sari Ysidora (Indonesia) Aditya Hari Sasongko	1	2
3	(Indonesia) Jessy Rompies (Indonesia) Christopher Rungkat	6	3	[12]
2	(Thailand) Nungnadda Wannasuk (Thailand) Sanchai Ratiwatana	1	6	[10]

Gold Medal Match
(Philippines) Denise Dy (Philippines) Treat Conrad Huey	4	6	[10]
2	(Indonesia) Jessy Rompies (Indonesia) Christopher Rungkat	6	3	[6]
