= Tennis at the 2011 SEA Games – Men's singles =

Men's singles
- Tennis at the 2011 SEA Games

Final
- Champion: (Indonesia) Christopher Rungkat
- Runner-up: (Thailand) Danai Udomchoke
- Score: 6–2, 6–2

Events
Singles	men	women
Doubles	men	women	mixed
Team	men	women
- SEA Games

Cecil Mamiit is the defending champion of the Men's Singles competition of the 2011 SEA Games but lost in the semifinals to Christopher Rungkat. Rungkat won the title by beating top seed Danai Udomchoke 6–2, 6–2 in the final.

== Medalists ==
Event	Gold	Silver	Bronze
Men's Singles	Indonesia Christopher Rungkat	Thailand Danai Udomchoke	Indonesia Elbert Sie
Men's Singles	Indonesia Christopher Rungkat	Thailand Danai Udomchoke	Philippines Cecil Mamiit

== Draw ==
=== Seeds ===
The top seed received bye to the quarterfinals.

1. (Thailand) Danai Udomchoke (final)
2. (Indonesia) Christopher Rungkat (champion)
3. (Thailand) Kittiphong Wachiramanowong (quarterfinals)
4. (Indonesia) Elbert Sie (semifinals)

=== Main draw ===
First round
(Laos) Lasavady Vitata	2	5
(Vietnam) Do Minh Quan	6	7
4	(Indonesia) Elbert Sie	6	7
(Myanmar) Aung Kyaw Naing	0	5
(Philippines) Jeson Petrombon	6	6
(Cambodia) Long Samneang	0	1
(Vietnam) Nguyen Hoang Thien	2	6	3
(Philippines) Cecil Mamiit	6	2	6
(Myanmar) Phyo Min Thar	0	1
3	(Thailand) Kittipong Wachiramanowong	6	6
(Malaysia) Si Yew Ming	6	6
(Laos) Keodalasouk D	2	1
(Cambodia) Kenny Bun	4	6^{3}
2	(Indonesia) Christopher Rungkat	6	7^{7}

Quarterfinals
1	(Thailand) Danai Udomchoke	6	6
(Vietnam) Do Minh Quan	2	1
4	(Indonesia) Elbert Sie	6	6
(Philippines) Jeson Petrombon	4	1
(Philippines) Cecil Mamiit	3	6	6
3	(Thailand) Kittipong Wachiramanowong	6	3	3
(Malaysia) Si Yew Ming	3	2
2	(Indonesia) Christopher Rungkat	6	6

Semifinals
1	(Thailand) Danai Udomchoke	6	6
4	(Indonesia) Elbert Sie	2	1
(Philippines) Cecil Mamiit	2	6	6^{6}
2	(Indonesia) Christopher Rungkat	6	4	7^{7}

Gold Medal Match
1	(Thailand) Danai Udomchoke	2	2
2	(Indonesia) Christopher Rungkat	6	6
