= Tennis at the 2011 SEA Games – Men's team =

Men's team
- Tennis at the 2011 SEA Games

Final
- Champion: Indonesia
- Runner-up: Philippines
- Score: 2–1

Events
Singles	men	women
Doubles	men	women	mixed
Team	men	women
- SEA Games

The Philippines were the defending champions of the Men's Team competition of the 2011 SEA Games but lost to Indonesia in the final. Each tie was the best of three rubbers, two singles and one doubles match.

== Medalists ==
Event	Gold	Silver	Bronze
Men's Team	Indonesia Christopher Rungkat; Elbert Sie; Aditya Hari Sasongko; David Agung Susanto	Philippines Cecil Mamiit; Jeson Petrombon; Treat Conrad Huey	Thailand Danai Udomchoke; Kittipong Wachiramanowong; Sanchai Ratiwatana; Sonchat Ratiwatana
Men's Team	Indonesia Christopher Rungkat; Elbert Sie; Aditya Hari Sasongko; David Agung Susanto	Philippines Cecil Mamiit; Jeson Petrombon; Treat Conrad Huey	Cambodia Orn Sambath; Kenny Bun; Long Samneang

== Draw ==
Quarterfinals; 13 November
Thailand
Bye
Myanmar	0
Philippines	3
Cambodia	2
Laos	1
Vietnam	0
Indonesia	3

Semifinals; 14 November
Thailand	1
Philippines	2
Cambodia	0
Indonesia	3

Final; 15 November
Philippines	1
Indonesia	2

=== Quarterfinals ===
Myanmar
0
Jakabaring Sport Complex, Palembang
13 November 2011
Hard (Outdoors)

Philippines
3

			1	2	3
1	(Myanmar) (Philippines)	Aung Kyaw Naing; Jeson Petrombon	1; 6	2; 6
2	(Myanmar) (Philippines)	Phyo Min Thar; Cecil Mamiit	1; 6	0; 6
3	(Myanmar) (Philippines)	Aung Ko Oo / Phyo Min Thar; Johnny Arcilla / Treat Conrad Huey	0; 6	4; 6

Cambodia
2
Jakabaring Sport Complex, Palembang
13 November 2011
Hard (Outdoors)

Laos
1

			1	2	3
1	(Cambodia) (Laos)	Orn Sambath; Lasavady Vitata	1; 6	4; 6
2	(Cambodia) (Laos)	Bun Kenny; Donedy Keodalasouk	6; 0	6; 0
3	(Cambodia) (Laos)	Bun Kenny / Orn Sambath; Donedy Keodalasouk / Lasavady Vitata	3; 6	6; 1	6; 0

Vietnam
0
Jakabaring Sport Complex, Palembang
13 November 2011
Hard (Outdoors)

Indonesia
3

			1	2	3
1	(Vietnam) (Indonesia)	Nguyen Hoang Thien; Christopher Rungkat	2; 6	1; 6
2	(Vietnam) (Indonesia)	Do Minh Quan; Elbert Sie	0; 6	6; 3	3; 6
3	(Vietnam) (Indonesia)	Ho Huynh Dan Mach / Ngô Quang Huy; Donedy Keodalasouk / Lasavady Vitata	2; 6	4; 6

=== Semifinals ===
Myanmar
1
Jakabaring Sport Complex, Palembang
14 November 2011
Hard (Outdoors)

Philippines
2

			1	2	3
1	(Myanmar) (Philippines)	Kittipong Wachiramanowong; Cecil Mamiit	1; 6	2; 6
2	(Myanmar) (Philippines)	Danai Udomchoke; Jeson Petrombon	7^{8} 6^{6}	6; 1
3	(Myanmar) (Philippines)	Sanchai Ratiwatana / Sonchat Ratiwatana; Treat Conrad Huey / Cecil Mamiit	6^{6} 7^{8}	6; 4	4; 6

Cambodia
0
Jakabaring Sport Complex, Palembang
14 November 2011
Hard (Outdoors)

Indonesia
3

			1	2	3
1	(Cambodia) (Indonesia)	Orn Sambath; David Agung Susanto	2; 6	2; 6
2	(Cambodia) (Indonesia)	Bun Kenny; Christopher Rungkat	6; 3	2; 6	0; 6
3	(Cambodia) (Indonesia)	Long Samneang / Orn Sambath; Aditya Hari Sasongko / Elbert Sie	0; 6	1; 6

=== Gold medal match ===
Philippines
1
Jakabaring Sport Complex, Palembang
November 15, 2011
Hard (Outdoors)

Indonesia
2

			1	2	3
1	(Philippines) (Indonesia)	Cecil Mamiit; Elbert Sie	1; 6	6; 3	6; 3
2	(Philippines) (Indonesia)	Jeson Petrombon; Christopher Rungkat	3; 6	2; 6
3	(Philippines) (Indonesia)	Cecil Mamiit / Treat Conrad Huey; Christopher Rungkat / Elbert Sie	3; 6	4; 6
