= Nungnadda Wannasuk =

Thai tennis player (born 1989)

- Native name: หนึ่งนัดดา วรรณสุข
- Country (sports): Thailand
- Residence: Bangkok, Thailand
- Born: 11 November 1989 (age 36) Nakhon Ratchasima, Thailand
- Height: 1.65 m (5 ft 5 in)
- Plays: Right (two-handed backhand)
- Prize money: $81,428

Singles
- Career record: 219–149
- Career titles: 9 ITF
- Highest ranking: No. 342 (10 June 2013)

Doubles
- Career record: 169–114
- Career titles: 15 ITF
- Highest ranking: No. 317 (17 August 2009)
Medal record
Tennis
Representing Thailand
Southeast Asian Games
Gold medal – first place	2011 Jakarta-Palembang	Doubles
Gold medal – first place	2011 Jakarta-Palembang	Team
Bronze medal – third place	2007 Nakhon Ratchasima	Doubles
Bronze medal – third place	2011 Jakarta-Palembang	Mixed doubles
Summer Universiade
Gold medal – first place	2011 Shenzhen	Team
Silver medal – second place	2011 Shenzhen	Singles

Nungnadda "Jib" Wannasuk (Thai: หนึ่งนัดดา วรรณสุข; born 11 November 1989) is a Thai former professional tennis player.

== Career ==
She earned her best result in the 2011 PTT Pattaya Open where she, as a qualifier, reached the second round. She lost to top seed Vera Zvonareva, 1–6, 5–7. Wannasuk fought hard as she was 1–6, 1–5 down.

Wannasuk won nine singles titles and 15 doubles titles on the ITF Women's Circuit. All of her singles titles are $10ks, and four of the doubles titles are $25ks. Her highest WTA rankings are 342 in singles, achieved on 10 June 2013, and 317 in doubles, set on 17 August 2009.

== ITF Circuit finals ==
=== Singles (9–10) ===
Legend $25,000 tournaments $10,000 tournaments	Finals by surface Hard (8–10) Carpet (1–0)

Result	No.	Date	Tournament	Surface	Opponent	Score
Win	1.	25 February 2006	Benin City, Nigeria	Hard	(Brazil) Nathalia Rossi	6–2, 6–1
Loss	2.	30 July 2006	Bangkok, Thailand	Hard	(Uzbekistan) Vlada Ekshibarova	4–6, 6–7^{(7–9)}
Win	3.	11 November 2006	Pune, India	Hard	(Kazakhstan) Amina Rakhim	3–6, 6–3, 6–2
Win	4.	6 May 2007	Jakarta, Indonesia	Hard	(Thailand) Noppawan Lertcheewakarn	3–6, 6–4, 6–3
Win	5.	20 July 2007	Khon Kaen, Thailand	Hard	(Chinese Taipei) Chen Yi	6–3, 6–0
Loss	6.	16 August 2008	Chiang Mai, Thailand	Hard	(Thailand) Noppawan Lertcheewakarn	2–6, 3–6
Win	7.	20 September 2009	Kyoto, Japan	Carpet (i)	(Japan) Akiko Yonemura	1–6, 6–3, 6–4
Win	8.	9 October 2010	Nonthaburi, Thailand	Hard	(China) Zhu Lin	6–4, 6–1
Loss	9.	6 November 2011	Kuching, Malaysia	Hard	(Thailand) Luksika Kumkhum	6–7^{(3–7)}, 3–6
Win	10.	10 June 2012	Taipei, Taiwan	Hard (i)	(Chinese Taipei) Chan Chin-wei	6–4, 7–6^{(7–3)}
Loss	11.	7 July 2012	Pattaya, Thailand	Hard	(Thailand) Luksika Kumkhum	2–6, 2–6
Win	12.	14 July 2012	Pattaya, Thailand	Hard	(South Korea) Jang Su-jeong	6–4, 4–6, 6–4
Loss	13.	1 December 2012	Bangkok, Thailand	Hard	(China) Wang Qiang	2–6, 1–6
Win	14.	15 December 2012	Bangkok, Thailand	Hard	(China) Wang Yafan	6–3, 6–1
Loss	15.	29 June 2013	Bangkok, Thailand	Hard	(Thailand) Peangtarn Plipuech	0–6, 1–6
Loss	16.	5 July 2014	Bangkok, Thailand	Hard	(Belgium) Elise Mertens	1–6, 1–6
Loss	17.	7 September 2014	Antalya, Turkey	Hard	(Finland) Emma Laine	0–6, 4–6
Loss	18.	4 April 2015	Dehradun, India	Hard	(Chinese Taipei) Hsu Ching-wen	6–7^{(4–7)}, 4–6
Loss	19.	30 May 2015	Bangkok, Thailand	Hard	(Thailand) Bunyawi Thamchaiwat	7–6^{(7–4)}, 3–6, ret.

=== Doubles (15–9) ===
Legend $25,000 tournaments $10,000 tournaments	Finals by surface Hard (15–9)

Result	No.	Date	Tournament	Surface	Partner	Opponents	Score
Win	1.	Jul 2006	Bangkok, Thailand	Hard	(Thailand) Varatchaya Wongteanchai	(Chinese Taipei) Chang Kai-chen (Vietnam) Nguyễn Thùy Dung	6–4, 6–4
Loss	2.	Nov 2006	Pune, India	Hard	(India) Madura Ranganathan	(India) Isha Lakhani (Kyrgyzstan) Ksenia Palkina	3–6, 6–4, 4–6
Loss	3.	Jul 2007	Khon Kaen, Thailand	Hard	(Philippines) Denise Dy	(Thailand) Sophia Mulsap (Thailand) Varatchaya Wongteanchai	4–6, 2–6
Win	4.	Sep 2007	New Delhi, India	Hard	(India) Tara Iyer	(Thailand) Sophia Mulsap (Thailand) Varatchaya Wongteanchai	6–4, 6–3
Loss	5.	Aug 2008	Khon Kaen, Thailand	Hard	(Thailand) Kanyapat Narattana	(India) Ankita Bhambri (India) Sanaa Bhambri	5–7, 6–7^{(6)}
Win	6.	Aug 2009	Jakarta, Indonesia	Hard	(Thailand) Varatchaya Wongteanchai	(Indonesia) Beatrice Gumulya (Indonesia) Jessy Rompies	6–2, 6–7^{(5)}, [10–7]
Loss	7.	Aug 2009	Solo, Indonesia	Hard	(Thailand) Kanyapat Narattana	(Indonesia) Beatrice Gumulya (Indonesia) Jessy Rompies	2–6, 2–6
Win	8.	Oct 2010	Nonthaburi, Thailand	Hard	(Thailand) Peangtarn Plipuech	(Chinese Taipei) Chen Yi (Thailand) Varatchaya Wongteanchai	7–5, 6–7^{(4)}, [11–9]
Win	9.	Dec 2010	Mandya, India	Hard	(Thailand) Peangtarn Plipuech	(India) Rushmi Chakravarthi (India) Poojashree Venkatesha	6–1, 6–1
Win	10.	Dec 2010	Bangalore, India	Hard	(Thailand) Luksika Kumkhum	(Chinese Taipei) Chen Yi (Japan) Kumiko Iijima	7–6^{(5)}, 5–7, [10–8]
Win	11.	Oct 2011	Jakarta, Indonesia	Hard	(Thailand) Nicha Lertpitaksinchai	(Chinese Taipei) Kao Shao-yuan (China) Zhao Yijing	6–4, 6–4
Win	12.	Nov 2011	Kuching, Malaysia	Hard	(Thailand) Luksika Kumkhum	(China) Lu Jiajing (China) Lu Jiaxiang	6–4, 6–3
Loss	13.	Oct 2012	Bidar, India	Hard	(China) Zhang Nannan	(Ukraine) Oleksandra Korashvili (India) Rishika Sunkara	4–6, 5–7
Win	14.	Mar 2014	Nonthaburi, Thailand	Hard	(Thailand) Varunya Wongteanchai	(Japan) Miyu Kato (Japan) Yuuki Tanaka	6–2, 6–2
Win	15.	May 2014	Bangkok, Thailand	Hard	(Thailand) Varunya Wongteanchai	(Chinese Taipei) Lee Hua-chen (India) Shweta Rana	1–6, 6–3, [10–8]
Win	16.	May 2014	Bangkok, Thailand	Hard	(Thailand) Varunya Wongteanchai	(Japan) Kyoka Okamura (Japan) Hirono Watanabe	6–2, 7–5
Loss	17.	Jun 2014	Bangkok, Thailand	Hard	(Chinese Taipei) Lee Pei-chi	(Japan) Yumi Miyazaki (Japan) Kotomi Takahata	3–6, 1–6
Loss	18.	Jul 2014	Bangkok, Thailand	Hard	(Thailand) Kamonwan Buayam	(Japan) Miyu Kato (Japan) Akiko Omae	0–6, 0–6
Loss	19.	Sep 2014	Antalya, Turkey	Hard	(Thailand) Varunya Wongteanchai	(Japan) Kotomi Takahata (Japan) Akiko Omae	4–6, 2–6
Win	20.	Apr 2015	Dehra Dun, India	Hard	(India) Prarthana Thombare	(India) Prerna Bhambri (India) Rishika Sunkara	6–0, 6–4
Win	21.	Apr 2015	Ahmedabad, India	Hard	(Thailand) Peangtarn Plipuech	(Japan) Nao Hibino (India) Prarthana Thombare	6–3, 2–6, [12–10]
Win	22.	May 2015	Bangkok, Thailand	Hard	(Chinese Taipei) Hsu Ching-wen	(Thailand) Kamonwan Buayam (South Korea) Kim Dabin	4–6, 7–6^{(4)}, [10–3]
Win	23.	Jun 2015	Bangkok, Thailand	Hard	(Oman) Fatma Al-Nabhani	(Thailand) Kamonwan Buayam (South Korea) Kim Dabin	6–3, 7–5
Loss	24.	Dec 2015	Bangkok, Thailand	Hard	(Indonesia) Jessy Rompies	(Russia) Irina Khromacheva (Russia) Valeria Solovyeva	5–7, 6–4, [12–10]
