= Jessy Rompies =

Indonesian tennis player

- Full name: Jessy Priskila Rompies
- Country (sports): Indonesia
- Residence: Jakarta, Indonesia
- Born: 14 April 1990 (age 36) Jakarta
- Height: 1.69 m (5 ft 7 in)
- Turned pro: 2004
- Plays: Right (one-handed backhand)
- Prize money: $133,115

Singles
- Career record: 173–148
- Career titles: 2 ITF
- Highest ranking: No. 413 (17 October 2011)

Doubles
- Career record: 344–225
- Career titles: 1 WTA Challenger, 28 ITF
- Highest ranking: No. 132 (18 July 2022)

Team competitions
- Fed Cup: 24–20
Medal record
Women's Tennis
Representing Indonesia
Asian Indoor and Martial Arts Games
Bronze medal – third place	2017 Ashgabat	Doubles
SEA Games
Gold medal – first place	2019 Philippines	Doubles
Gold medal – first place	2023 Cambodia	Team
Silver medal – second place	2009 Vientiane	Team
Silver medal – second place	2011 Jakarta-Palembang	Team
Silver medal – second place	2017 Kuala Lumpur	Mixed doubles
Silver medal – second place	2023 Cambodia	Doubles
Bronze medal – third place	2009 Vientiane	Doubles
Bronze medal – third place	2011 Jakarta-Palembang	Doubles
Bronze medal – third place	2011 Jakarta-Palembang	Mixed doubles
Bronze medal – third place	2015 Singapore	Doubles
Bronze medal – third place	2015 Singapore	Mixed doubles
Bronze medal – third place	2015 Singapore	Team
Bronze medal – third place	2021 Vietnam	Doubles
Bronze medal – third place	2021 Vietnam	Team
Women's Padel
Representing Indonesia
Asia Cup
Bronze medal – third place	2025 Doha	Team
- Last updated on: 24 June 2026.

Jessy Priskila Rompies (born 14 April 1990) is an Indonesian inactive tennis player. She made her debut as a professional in 2004, aged 14, at an ITF tournament in Jakarta, and was coached by Suzanna Wibowo.

Rompies has won numerous medals at the SEA Games, including a gold in women's doubles in 2019, and a team gold and silver in doubles in 2023.

== Career ==
Rompies has played in several junior Grand Slam tournaments. Her best result was reaching the semifinals of the 2008 US Open girls' doubles, partnered by Beatrice Gumulya. Rompies and Gumulya lost the semifinal match in a tiebreak.

In February 2009, Rompies represented Indonesia in the 2009 Fed Cup Asia/Oceania Zone Group I tournament. She played two doubles matches and one singles match. In her first match, Rompies and Ayu-Fani Damayanti defeated Ankita Bhambri and Rushmi Chakravarthi of India.

In 2011, Rompies represented Indonesia in the 2011 Fed Cup Asia/Oceania Zone Group II tournament and Group I playoff. She played four doubles matches with partner Yayuk Basuki, winning each match to see her country back in the Asia/Oceania Group I. She won one singles title and three doubles titles on the ITF circuit that year. She played in one WTA tournament in 2011, the Malaysian Open. She successfully represented her country at the 2011 SEA Games in Palembang, winning bronze in the women's doubles, mixed doubles, and silver for the women's team. Rompies again won medals in these three events at the 2015 SEA Games in Singapore.

Rompies also played in Fed Cup (2012 and 2016). Playing for the Indonesia Fed Cup team, she has a win–loss record of 24–20 (as of October 2024).

== WTA 125 finals ==
=== Doubles: 2 (1 title, 1 runner-up) ===
Result	W–L	Date	Tournament	Surface	Partner	Opponents	Score
Loss	0–1	Sep 2016	Dalian Open, China	Hard	(Thailand) Nicha Lertpitaksinchai	(Chinese Taipei) Lee Ya-hsuan (Japan) Kotomi Takahata	2–6, 1–6
Win	1–1	Aug 2021	Concord Open, United States	Hard	(Thailand) Peangtarn Plipuech	(United States) Usue Maitane Arconada (Spain) Cristina Bucșa	3–6, 7–6^{(7–5)}, [10–8]

== ITF Circuit finals ==
=== Singles: 5 (2 titles, 3 runner-ups) ===
Legend $10,000 tournaments (2–3)	Finals by surface Hard (2–3)

Result	W–L	Date	Tournament	Tier	Surface	Opponent	Score
Loss	0–1	Nov 2009	ITF Kuching, Malaysia	10,000	Hard	(Indonesia) Lavinia Tananta	1–6, 5–7
Win	1–1	Jun 2010	ITF Nonthaburi, Thailand	10,000	Hard	(Thailand) Nicha Lertpitaksinchai	6–2, 7–5
Loss	2–1	Jun 2011	ITF Surabaya, Indonesia	10,000	Hard	(Indonesia) Sandy Gumulya	1–6, 6–1, 1–6
Win	2–2	Jun 2011	ITF Tarakan, Indonesia	10,000	Hard	(Indonesia) Ayu Fani Damayanti	6–1, 6–2
Loss	2–3	Oct 2016	ITF Jakarta, Indonesia	10,000	Hard	(Singapore) Stefanie Tan	4–6, 4–6

=== Doubles: 50 (28 titles, 22 runner-ups) ===
Legend $80,000 tournaments (1–0) $60,000 tournaments (1–1) $40,000 tournaments (0–1) $25,000 tournaments (5–11) $10/15,000 tournaments (21–9)	Finals by surface Hard (27–21) Clay (0–1) Carpet (1–0)

Result	W–L	Date	Tournament	Tier	Surface	Partner	Opponents	Score
Win	1–0	Apr 2007	ITF Jakarta, Indonesia	10,000	Hard	(Philippines) Denise Dy	(Indonesia) Vivien Silfany-Tony (Indonesia) Lavinia Tananta	6–0, 6–2
Win	2–0	Jul 2007	ITF Khon Kaen, Thailand	10,000	Hard	(Indonesia) Vivien Silfany-Tony	(South Korea) Kim Sun-jung (South Korea) Lee Cho-won	3–6, 6–1, 6–4
Win	3–0	Nov 2008	ITF Manila, Philippines	10,000	Hard	(Indonesia) Lavinia Tananta	(Chinese Taipei) Kao Shao-yuan (China) Zheng Junyi	6–1, 5–7, [10–8]
Win	4–0	Nov 2008	ITF Manila, Philippines	10,000	Hard	(Indonesia) Ayu Fani Damayanti	(Chinese Taipei) Juan Ting-fei (China) Yi Zhong	7–6^{(2)}, 6–3
Loss	4–1	Mar 2009	ITF Hamilton, New Zealand	10,000	Hard	(Thailand) Varatchaya Wongteanchai	(South Korea) Kim So-jung (Japan) Ayaka Maekawa	5–7, 3–6
Win	5–1	May 2009	ITF Tarakan, Indonesia	10,000	Hard	(Indonesia) Beatrice Gumulya	(Japan) Yurina Koshino (Japan) Erika Sema	7–6^{(2)}, 6–3
Loss	5–2	May 2009	ITF Tanjung Selor, Indonesia	25,000	Hard	(Indonesia) Beatrice Gumulya	(Indonesia) Ayu Fani Damayanti (Indonesia) Lavinia Tananta	1–6, 1–6
Loss	5–3	Jul 2009	ITF Jakarta, Indonesia	10,000	Hard	(Indonesia) Beatrice Gumulya	(Thailand) Nungnadda Wannasuk (Thailand) Varatchaya Wongteanchai	2–6, 7–6^{(5)}, [7–10]
Win	6–3	Aug 2009	ITF Solo, Indonesia	10,000	Hard	(Indonesia) Beatrice Gumulya	(Thailand) Kanyapat Narattana (Thailand) Nungnadda Wannasuk	6–2, 6–2
Win	7–3	Aug 2009	ITF Nonthaburi, Thailand	10,000	Hard	(Hong Kong) Zhang Ling	(Japan) Tomoko Dokei (South Korea) Yoo Mi	6–2, 1–6, [10–8]
Loss	7–4	Sep 2009	ITF Darwin, Australia	25,000	Hard	(Australia) Alenka Hubacek	(Australia) Isabella Holland (Australia) Sally Peers	4–6, 6–3, [4–10]
Loss	7–5	May 2010	ITF Tanjung Selor, Indonesia	25,000	Hard	(Thailand) Noppawan Lertcheewakarn	(China) Liu Wanting (Hong Kong) Zhang Ling	6–7^{(5)}, 3–6
Loss	7–6	May 2010	ITF Bukhara, Uzbekistan	25,000	Hard	(Indonesia) Yayuk Basuki	(Georgia (country)) Tatia Mikadze (Georgia (country)) Sofia Shapatava	3–6, 3–6
Loss	7–7	Jul 2010	ITF Pattaya, Thailand	10,000	Hard	(Thailand) Varatchaya Wongteanchai	(Chinese Taipei) Chen Yi (Japan) Sakiko Shimizu	3–6, 6–7^{(2)}
Win	8–7	Jul 2010	ITF Jakarta, Indonesia	10,000	Hard	(India) Poojashree Venkatesha	(Japan) Yumi Miyazaki (Japan) Tomoko Taira	6–2, 7–5
Win	9–7	Sep 2010	ITF Jakarta, Indonesia	10,000	Hard	(Indonesia) Ayu Fani Damayanti	(Thailand) Peangtarn Plipuech (Indonesia) Laili Rahmawati Ulfa	6–0, 6–0
Loss	9–8	Oct 2010	ITF Mount Gambier, Australia	25,000	Hard	(Indonesia) Ayu-Fani Damayanti	(Australia) Alison Bai (Brazil) Ana Clara Duarte	w/o
Loss	9–9	Apr 2011	ITF Antalya, Turkey	10,000	Hard	(Indonesia) Grace Sari Ysidora	(Russia) Irina Glimakova (Russia) Polina Monova	4–6, 7–6^{(4)}, [8–10]
Loss	9–10	Apr 2011	ITF Antalya, Turkey	10,000	Hard	(Indonesia) Grace Sari Ysidora	(United Kingdom) Lucy Brown (United Kingdom) Francesca Stephenson	4–6, 4–6
Win	10–10	May 2011	ITF Bangkok, Thailand	10,000	Hard	(Indonesia) Grace Sari Ysidora	(Indonesia) Ayu Fani Damayanti (Indonesia) Lavinia Tananta	3–6, 6–4, [10–5]
Win	11–10	Jun 2011	ITF Surabaya, Indonesia	10,000	Hard	(Indonesia) Grace Sari Ysidora	(Indonesia) Sandy Gumulya (Indonesia) Cynthia Melita	6–3, 6–4
Loss	11–11	Jun 2011	ITF Tarakan, Indonesia	10,000	Hard	(Indonesia) Grace Sari Ysidora	(Japan) Moe Kawatoko (Japan) Miki Miyamura	2–6, 5–7
Win	12–11	Sep 2011	ITF Cairns, Australia	25,000	Hard	(Indonesia) Ayu-Fani Damayanti	(Brazil) Maria Fernanda Alves (United Kingdom) Samantha Murray	6–3, 6–3
Loss	12–12	Oct 2011	ITF Palembang, Indonesia	25,000	Hard	(Indonesia) Ayu-Fani Damayanti	(Belgium) Tamaryn Hendler (South Africa) Chanel Simmonds	4–6, 2–6
Win	13–12	Jul 2013	ITF Solo, Indonesia	10,000	Hard	(Indonesia) Beatrice Gumulya	(Indonesia) Aldila Sutjiadi (China) Zhu Aiwen	6–2, 6–4
Loss	13–13	Jul 2013	ITF Solo, Indonesia	10,000	Hard	(Indonesia) Beatrice Gumulya	(Indonesia) Ayu Fani Damayanti (Indonesia) Lavinia Tananta	6–4, 1–6, [5–10]
Loss	13–14	Jun 2014	ITF Tarakan, Indonesia	10,000	Hard	(Indonesia) Beatrice Gumulya	(Thailand) Varatchaya Wongteanchai (Thailand) Varunya Wongteanchai	7–5, 4–6, [9–11]
Loss	13–15	Jun 2014	ITF Solo, Indonesia	10,000	Hard	(Indonesia) Beatrice Gumulya	(Indonesia) Nadia Ravita (Indonesia) Aldila Sutjiadi	2–6, 6–7^{(3)}
Win	14–15	Sep 2015	ITF Solo, Indonesia	10,000	Hard	(Indonesia) Beatrice Gumulya	(Malaysia) Jawairiah Noordin (Indonesia) Vita Taher	6–3, 7–5
Win	15–15	Oct 2015	ITF Jakarta, Indonesia	10,000	Hard	(Indonesia) Beatrice Gumulya	(Japan) Haine Ogata (India) Dhruthi Tatachar Venugopal	6–4, 7–6^{(4)}
Loss	15–16	Dec 2015	ITF Bangkok, Thailand	25,000	Hard	(Thailand) Nungnadda Wannasuk	(Russia) Irina Khromacheva (Russia) Valeria Solovyeva	5–7, 6–4, [10–12]
Win	16–16	Jul 2016	ITF Gimcheon, South Korea	10,000	Hard	(Hong Kong) Katherine Ip	(South Korea) Kim Hae-sung (South Korea) Kim Mi-ok	6–3, 6–3
Win	17–16	Jul 2016	ITF Gimcheon, South Korea	10,000	Hard	(Japan) Ayano Shimizu	(South Korea) Hong Seung-yeon (South Korea) Kang Seo-kyung	6–2, 7–5
Win	18–16	Oct 2016	ITF Tarakan, Indonesia	10,000	Hard (i)	(Indonesia) Beatrice Gumulya	(India) Kanika Vaidya (China) Wang Danni	6–3, 6–1
Win	19–16	Oct 2016	ITF Jakarta, Indonesia	10,000	Hard	(Indonesia) Beatrice Gumulya	(Chinese Taipei) Chien Pei-ju (Japan) Tomoko Dokei	6–0, 6–2
Win	20–16	Nov 2016	ITF Hua Hin, Thailand	10,000	Hard	(Malaysia) Jawairiah Noordin	(Thailand) Kamonwan Buayam (Hong Kong) Zhang Ling	6–4, 6–3
Win	21–16	Jul 2017	ITF Hua Hin, Thailand	15,000	Hard	(Indonesia) Beatrice Gumulya	(Thailand) Nudnida Luangnam (Thailand) Varunya Wongteanchai	6–2, 6–1
Win	22–16	Aug 2017	ITF Nonthaburi, Thailand	15,000	Hard	(Indonesia) Beatrice Gumulya	(Thailand) Tamachan Momkoonthod (India) Pranjala Yadlapalli	6–0, 7–6^{(5)}
Win	23–16	Dec 2017	Pune Championships, India	25,000	Hard	(Thailand) Varunya Wongteanchai	(United Kingdom) Samantha Murray (Montenegro) Ana Veselinović	6–4, 6–2
Win	24–16	Jun 2018	ITF Hong Kong	25,000	Hard	(Chinese Taipei) Lee Pei-chi	(France) Victoria Muntean (India) Pranjala Yadlapalli	6–3, 6–4
Loss	24–17	Dec 2018	ITF Mumbai, India	25,000	Hard	(Turkey) Berfu Cengiz	(Uzbekistan) Albina Khabibulina (Russia) Ekaterina Yashina	2–6, 1–6
Win	25–17	May 2019	ITF Singapore	25,000	Hard	(Indonesia) Beatrice Gumulya	(Papua New Guinea) Abigail Tere-Apisah (India) Rutuja Bhosale	6–4, 0–6, [10–6]
Loss	25–18	Jun 2019	ITF Jakarta, Indonesia	25,000	Hard	(Indonesia) Beatrice Gumulya	(Japan) Junri Namigata (Japan) Haruka Kaji	2–6, 6–4, [7–10]
Win	26–18	Nov 2019	Tyler Pro Challenge, United States	80,000	Hard	(Indonesia) Beatrice Gumulya	(Chinese Taipei) Hsu Chieh-yu (Mexico) Marcela Zacarías	6–2, 6–3
Loss	26–19	Nov 2021	ITF Naples, United States	25,000	Hard	(Chinese Taipei) Hsu Chieh-yu	(United States) Hanna Chang (United States) Elizabeth Mandlik	4–6, 6–1, [7–10]
Win	27–19	Jun 2022	ITF Cantanhede, Portugal	25,000	Carpet	(Australia) Olivia Tjandramulia	(Brazil) Ingrid Martins (United Kingdom) Emily Webley-Smith	6–2, 7–6^{(1)}
Loss	27–20	Nov 2022	Sydney Challenger, Australia	60,000	Hard	(Australia) Alexandra Osborne	(Australia) Destanee Aiava (Australia) Lisa Mays	7–5, 3–6, [6–10]
Win	28–20	Nov 2022	ITF Tokyo Open, Japan	60,000	Hard (i)	(Chinese Taipei) Hsieh Yu-chieh	(Japan) Mai Hontama (Japan) Junri Namigata	6–4, 6–3
Loss	28–21	Jan 2023	ITF Nonthaburi, Thailand	40,000	Hard	(Chinese Taipei) Lee Pei-chi	(Chinese Taipei) Liang En-shuo (China) Ma Yexin	3–6, 6–2, [6–10]
Loss	28–22	Jun 2023	ITF Périgueux, France	25,000	Clay	(Australia) Olivia Tjandramulia	(Greece) Sapfo Sakellaridi (Czech Republic) Anna Sisková	2–6, 1–6

== ITF Junior finals ==
=== Singles: 7 (4 titles, 3 runner-ups) ===
Legend Category G1 / B1 Category G2 Category G3 Category G4 Category G5	Finals by surface Hard (4–2) Clay (0–1)

Result	W–L	Date	Tournament	Tier	Surface	Opponent	Score
Loss	0–1	Jul 2006	ITF Hannibal, Tunisia	G4	Clay	(Slovakia) Katarina Poljaková	6–7^{(3–7)}, 3–6
Loss	0–2	Jan 2007	ITF Chandigarh, India	G3	Hard	(Uzbekistan) Alexandra Kolesnichenko	0–6, 4–6
Win	1–2	Jun 2007	ITF Jakarta, Indonesia	G4	Hard	(Malaysia) Jawairiah Noordin	7–5, 6–0
Win	2–2	Jul 2007	ITF Bandung, Indonesia	G4	Hard	(Indonesia) Lutfiana-Aris Budiharto	7–6^{(7–3)}, 7–5
Win	3–2	Mar 2008	ITF Jakarta, Indonesia	G2	Hard	(Indonesia) Beatrice Gumulya	6–4, 6–1
Win	4–2	Mar 2008	ITF Nonthaburi, Thailand	G1	Hard	(Ukraine) Lyudmyla Kichenok	7–6^{(7–5)}, 3–6, 6–4
Loss	4–3	Nov 2008	Asia Oceania Closed, Balikpapan, Indonesia	B1	Hard	(Thailand) Noppawan Lertcheewakarn	4–6, 2–6

=== Doubles: 22 (15 titles, 7 runner-ups) ===
Legend Category G1 / B1 Category G2 Category G3 Category G4 Category G5	Finals by surface Hard (11–5) Clay (4–1) Grass (0–1)

Result	W–L	Date	Tournament	Tier	Surface	Partner	Opponents	Score
Loss	0–1	Nov 2004	ITF Surabaya, Indonesia	G4	Hard	(Indonesia) Mia Sacca	(Indonesia) Nancy Metriya (Indonesia) Patricia Soesilo	7–6^{(7–1)}, 1–6, 4–6
Loss	0–2	Jun 2005	ITF Jakarta, Indonesia	G4	Hard	(Indonesia) Lutfiana-Aris Budiharto	(Hong Kong) Venise Chan (Hong Kong) Yi Yang	3–6, 5–7
Loss	0–3	Oct 2005	Asia Oceania Closed, Bangkok, Thailand	B1	Hard	(Uzbekistan) Dilyara Saidkhodjaeva	(Australia) Tyra Calderwood (Australia) Jessica Moore	5–7, 4–6
Win	1–3	Nov 2005	ITF Solo, Indonesia	G4	Hard	(Indonesia) Vivien Silfany-Tony	(Russia) Agusta Tsybysheva (Russia) Anna Vavrik	6–0, 6–1
Win	2–3	Nov 2005	ITF Surabaya, Indonesia	G4	Hard	(Indonesia) Vivien Silfany-Tony	(Indonesia) Lutfiana-Aris Budiharto (Indonesia) Beatrice Gumulya	6–2, 6–2
Win	3–3	Feb 2006	ITF Rajshahi, Bangladesh	G3	Hard	(Indonesia) Vivien Silfany-Tony	(South Korea) Jeong Yoo-youn (Japan) Erina Kikuchi	7–6^{(7–3)}, 7–5
Win	4–3	Jun 2006	ITF Casablanca, Morocco	G2	Clay	(United States) Stefanie Nunic	(Italy) Giola Barbieri (Italy) Vivienne Vierin	6–2, 5–7, 6–3
Win	5–3	Jul 2006	ITF Tunis, Tunisia	G3	Clay	(Belarus) Ima Bohush	(Morocco) Nadia Lalami (Chile) Giannina Minieri	7–5, 6–3
Win	6–3	Jul 2006	ITF Hannibal, Tunisia	G4	Clay	(Belarus) Ima Bohush	(Austria) Natasha Bredl (Austria) Lisa Summerer	6–2, 6–4
Loss	6–4	Nov 2006	Asia Oceania Closed, Bangkok, Thailand	B1	Hard	(Australia) Jessica Moore	(Chinese Taipei) Chang Kai-chen (Japan) Ayumi Morita	6–4, 5–7, 3–6
Win	7–4	Nov 2006	ITF Surabaya, Indonesia	G4	Hard	(Indonesia) Lutfiana-Aris Budiharto	(South Korea) Kim Kun-hee (South Korea) Kim So-yeon	6–2, 6–1
Win	8–4	Nov 2006	ITF Solo, Indonesia	G4	Hard	(Indonesia) Lutfiana-Aris Budiharto	(Indonesia) Angelika Jogasuria (Indonesia) Angelina Jogasuria	6–3, 6–1
Loss	8–5	Jan 2007	ITF Kolkata, India	G3	Clay	(Indonesia) Beatrice Gumulya	(Ukraine) Julia Golobodorodko (Ukraine) Anastasiya Vasyleva	6–1, 3–6, 4–6
Win	9–5	Apr 2007	ITF Manila, Philippines	G1	Hard	(Philippines) Denise Dy	(Chinese Taipei) Chang Kai-chen (United States) Li Ruo-Qi	6–3, 6–1
Win	10–5	Jul 2007	ITF Bandung, Indonesia	G4	Hard	(Indonesia) Lutfiana-Aris Budiharto	(Japan) Maho Kowase (Japan) Mika Morimoto	6–2, 6–4
Win	11–5	Nov 2007	ITF Sarawak, Malaysia	G3	Hard	(Indonesia) Beatrice Gumulya	(Hungary) Tímea Babos (Hungary) Réka Luca Jani	7–5, 6–1
Win	12–5	Mar 2008	ITF Jakarta, Indonesia	G2	Hard	(Indonesia) Beatrice Gumulya	(Ukraine) Lyudmyla Kichenok (Ukraine) Nadiia Kichenok	w/o
Loss	12–6	Mar 2008	ITF Sarawak, Malaysia	G1	Hard	(Indonesia) Beatrice Gumulya	(Ukraine) Lyudmyla Kichenok (Ukraine) Nadiia Kichenok	6–7^{(1–7)}, 4–6
Win	13–6	May 2008	ITF Santa Croce, Italy	G1	Clay	(Morocco) Nadia Lalami	(Serbia) Bojana Jovanovski (Ukraine) Maryna Zanevska	6–2, 7–6^{(7–2)}
Loss	13–7	Jun 2008	ITF Roehampton, Great Britain	G1	Grass	(Indonesia) Beatrice Gumulya	(United Kingdom) Jade Curtis (Thailand) Noppawan Lertcheewakarn	4–6, 1–6
Win	14–7	Sep 2008	ITF Lexington, United States	G1	Hard	(Indonesia) Beatrice Gumulya	(United States) Jacqueline Cako (United States) Courtney Dolehide	5–7, 6–3, [10–7]
Win	15–7	Nov 2008	Asia Oceania Closed, Balikpapan, Indonesia	B1	Hard	(Indonesia) Beatrice Gumulya	(Japan) Miyabi Inoue (Thailand) Noppawan Lertcheewakarn	7–5, 3–6, 7–6^{(7–5)}

== National representation ==
=== Multi-sport event ===
Rompies made her debut representing Indonesia in multi-sport event at the 2009 Southeast Asian Games, she won the women's doubles bronze medal.

==== Doubles: 6 (1 gold medal, 5 bronze medals) ====
Result	Date	Tournament	Surface	Partner	Opponents	Score
Bronze	Dec 2009	SEA Games, Vientiane	Hard	(Indonesia) Sandy Gumulya	(Thailand) Tamarine Tanasugarn (Thailand) Varatchaya Wongteanchai	1–6, 0–6
Bronze	Nov 2011	SEA Games, Palembang	Hard	(Indonesia) Ayu Fani Damayanti	(Thailand) Nicha Lertpitaksinchai (Thailand) Varatchaya Wongteanchai	3–6, 6–3, [7–10]
Bronze	Jun 2015	SEA Games, Singapore	Hard	(Indonesia) Aldila Sutjiadi	(Thailand) Noppawan Lertcheewakarn (Thailand) Varatchaya Wongteanchai	2–6, 3–6
Bronze	Sep 2017	Asian Indoor and Martial Arts Games, Ashgabat	Hard	(Indonesia) Lavinia Tananta	(India) Ankita Raina (India) Prarthana Thombare	6–3, 6–7, 4–6
Gold	Dec 2019	SEA Games, Manila	Hard	(Indonesia) Beatrice Gumulya	(Thailand) Peangtarn Plipuech (Thailand) Tamarine Tanasugarn	6–3, 6–3
Bronze	May 2022	SEA Games, Bắc Ninh	Hard	(Indonesia) Beatrice Gumulya	(Thailand) Pimrada Jattavapornvanit (Thailand) Lanlana Tararudee	6–4, 2–6, [8–10]

==== Mixed doubles: 3 (2 silver medals, 1 bronze medal) ====
Result	Date	Tournament	Surface	Partner	Opponents	Score
Silver	Nov 2011	SEA Games, Palembang	Hard	(Indonesia) Christopher Rungkat	(Philippines) Treat Huey (Philippines) Denise Dy	6–4, 3–6, [6–10]
Bronze	Jun 2015	SEA Games, Singapore	Hard	(Indonesia) Sunu Wahyu Trijati	(Thailand) Sonchat Ratiwatana (Thailand) Peangtarn Plipuech	4–6, 1–6
Silver	Aug 2017	SEA Games, Kuala Lumpur	Hard	(Indonesia) Christopher Rungkat	(Thailand) Sanchai Ratiwatana (Thailand) Nicha Lertpitaksinchai	1–6, 2–6
