= Elbert Sie =

Indonesian tennis player

- Full name: Alexander Elbert Sie
- Country (sports): Indonesia
- Born: 6 September 1987 (age 39) Bandung, Indonesia
- Height: 170 cm (5 ft 7 in)
- Plays: Right-handed
- Prize money: $21,809

Singles
- Highest ranking: No. 687 (15 October 2007)

Doubles
- Highest ranking: No. 698 (9 May 2011)
Medal record
Men's Tennis
Representing Indonesia
Islamic Solidarity Games
Gold medal – first place	2013 Palembang	Doubles
Gold medal – first place	2013 Palembang	Team
Southeast Asian Games
Gold medal – first place	2011 Jakarta-Palembang	Doubles
Gold medal – first place	2011 Jakarta-Palembang	Team
Silver medal – second place	2007 Nakhon Ratchasima	Team
Bronze medal – third place	2007 Nakhon Ratchasima	Singles
Bronze medal – third place	2007 Nakhon Ratchasima	Doubles
Bronze medal – third place	2011 Jakarta-Palembang	Singles
Men's Soft tennis
Representing Indonesia
Asian Games
Silver medal – second place	2018 Jakarta Palembang	Singles
Bronze medal – third place	2018 Jakarta Palembang	Team
Southeast Asian Games
Bronze medal – third place	2019 Philippines	Team

Alexander Elbert Sie (born 6 September 1987), known as Elbert Sie, is an Indonesian former professional tennis player. After retiring he became a national representative in the sport of soft tennis.

== Biography ==
=== Sporting career ===
Born in Bandung, Sie had a best junior world ranking of 63 and appeared in the boys' singles main draw at Wimbledon, before competing professionally at ITF Futures level from 2006 to 2013.

Sie reached a career high singles world ranking on the professional tour of 687 and won three Futures doubles titles. At ATP Challenger Level, he made one attempt to qualify, in Bangkok in 2012. Unfortunately, in the first qualifying round, Sie had to retire against Hsin-Han Lee whilst leading 6-2 0–1. As a result, he has never lost a completed set at this level.

A regular Indonesian representative in regional multi-sport events, Sie won two gold medals at the 2011 Southeast Asian Games, in the men's doubles and team events. He also claimed two gold medals at the 2013 Islamic Solidarity Games and in 2014 made his Asian Games debut in Incheon.

Sie featured in a total of 18 Davis Cup rubbers for Indonesia between 2006 and 2014, across 12 ties. He registered wins in four singles and three doubles rubbers.

By the time of the 2018 Asian Games he had made the switch to soft tennis and replicated the feat of another Davis Cup player Edi Kusdaryanto by winning a silver medal in the singles event.

=== Personal life ===
Sie married Indonesian actress Stevani Nepa in December 2018.

== Titles ==
Legend ITF Futures (3)	Titles by surface Hard (2) Clay (1)

=== Doubles: (3) ===
No.	Date	Tournament	Surface	Partner	Opponents	Score
1.	Aug 2006	Indonesia F3, Manado	Hard	(Indonesia) Bonit Wiryawan	(Chinese Taipei) Lee Hsin-han (Chinese Taipei) Peng Hsien-yin	4–6, 6–3, 6–4
2.	Oct 2010	Iran F5, Tehran	Clay	(India) Ranjeet Virali-Murugesan	(Austria) Christoph Lessiak-Collé (Austria) Bjorn Propst	6–3, 6–2
3.	Jul 2012	Indonesia F1, Jakarta	Hard	(Indonesia) Christopher Rungkat	(South Korea) Kim Cheong-eui (South Korea) Oh Dae-soung	4–6, 7–5, [10–3]

== See also ==
- List of Indonesia Davis Cup team representatives
