= Noppawan Lertcheewakarn =

Thai tennis player (born 1991)

Noppawan Lertcheewakarn นพวรรณ เลิศชีวกานต์
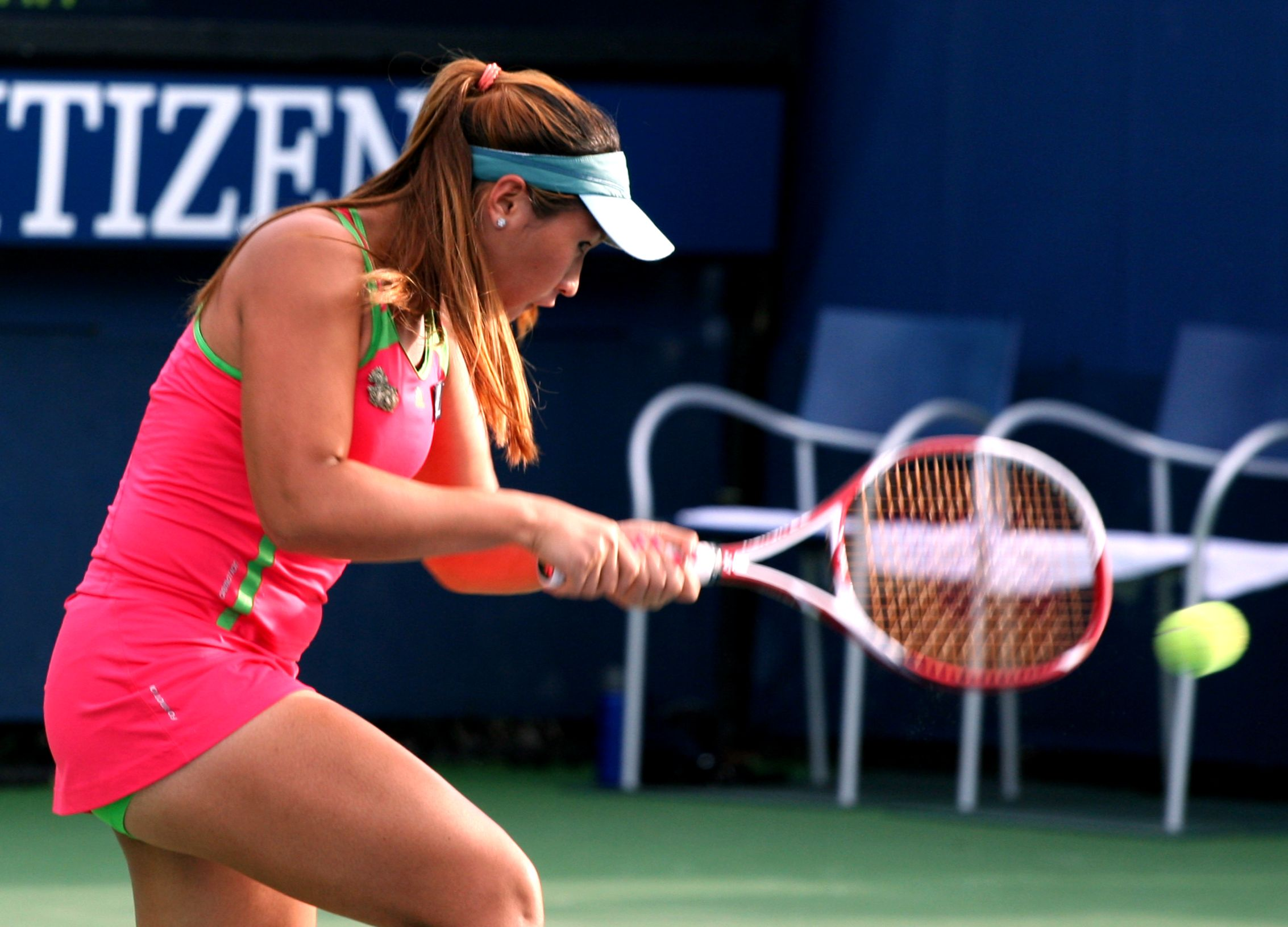
- Noppawan Lertcheewakarn at the 2011 US Open
- Country (sports): Thailand
- Residence: Bangkok, Thailand
- Born: 18 November 1991 (age 34) Chiang Mai, Thailand
- Height: 1.67 m (5 ft 6 in)
- Turned pro: 18 June 2009
- Retired: August 2017 (last match played)
- Plays: Right-handed (two-handed both sides)
- Prize money: $293,951

Singles
- Career record: 242–191
- Career titles: 5 ITF
- Highest ranking: No. 149 (26 September 2011)

Grand Slam singles results
- Australian Open: Q2 (2011)
- French Open: Q1 (2011, 2012)
- Wimbledon: 1R (2010)
- US Open: 1R (2011)

Doubles
- Career record: 141–112
- Career titles: 8 ITF
- Highest ranking: No. 97 (15 August 2011)

Grand Slam doubles results
- Wimbledon: 1R (2011)
Medal record
Women's tennis
Representing Thailand
Asian Games
Bronze medal – third place	2010 Guangzhou	Team
Southeast Asian Games
Gold medal – first place	2011 Jakarta-Palembang	Doubles
Gold medal – first place	2011 Jakarta-Palembang	Team
Gold medal – first place	2015 Singapore	Singles
Gold medal – first place	2015 Singapore	Doubles
Gold medal – first place	2015 Singapore	Team
Silver medal – second place	2011 Jakarta-Palembang	Singles
Silver medal – second place	2017 Kuala Lumpur	Doubles
Bronze medal – third place	2007 Nakhon Ratchasima	Singles
Summer Universiade
Silver medal – second place	2013 Kazan	Doubles

Noppawan "Nok" Lertcheewakarn (Thai: นพวรรณ เลิศชีวกานต์; born 18 November 1991) is a former professional Thai tennis player. At 2009 Wimbledon Championships, she won the junior singles title. She reached career-high WTA rankings of 149 in singles and 97 in doubles.

As of July 2018, Lertcheewakarn having played her last match in August 2017, is in training to be a police officer. She has yet to officially retire.

== Playing style ==
Lertcheewakarn is a counterpuncher with her two-handed backhand and forehand. Her game is lacking powerful strokes, but based on precise groundstrokes and good strategy. Her main weakness is considered to be her serve, lacking of power, consistency and stability.

She has been inspired by Tamarine Tanasugarn, Monica Seles, Marion Bartoli, and Williams sisters. Lertcheewakarn has been coached by Chuck Kriese.

== Junior career ==
In 2008, Lertcheewakarn was world No. 1 in ITF Junior Circuit, became the first Thai player to ever hold that position. In the same year, Lertcheewakarn won the girls' ITF World Champions.

She has reached two Grand Slam girls' singles finals: 2008 Wimbledon losing to Laura Robson, and 2009 Wimbledon beating Kristina Mladenovic. She also reached four Grand Slam girls' doubles finals, won 2008 US Open with Sandra Roma, 2009 French Open with Elena Bogdan, 2009 Wimbledon with Sally Peers, but lost the 2009 US Open, partnering Elena Bogdan.

== Professional career ==
=== 2006–2009 ===
Lertcheewakarn started playing her first ITF Circuit events in August 2006. She made her WTA Tour main-draw debut in 2007 as a qualifier, defeating world No. 97, Melinda Czink of Hungary, in straight sets in the final qualifying round, before losing to Aiko Nakamura in three sets in the first round.

In May 2008, Lertcheewakarn won her first pro title in singles at $25k Balikpapan, defeating the top seed Isha Lakhani of India, in straight sets. In 2009, Lertcheewakarn received a main-draw wildcard into the Pattaya Open; she lost her first-round match against Shahar Pe'er, which lasted 52 minutes, 1–6, 0–6.

=== 2010 ===
She received a wildcard to Pattaya Open, but lost in the first round to Chanelle Scheepers, in a two-hour-and-forty-minute three-set match in which Lertcheewakarn had a 4–1 lead in the second set. She then received a wildcard to the Malaysian Open where she beat Ksenia Pervak in the first round in straight sets, making this her first WTA main-draw win ever. At the $50k Nottingham Trophy, she advanced into the quarterfinals, before losing to Elena Baltacha in two straight sets. Lertcheewakarn received a wildcard entry to the Wimbledon Championships where she was defeated by Andrea Hlaváčková in the first round. She ended the year inside top 200 in singles and doubles.

=== 2011 ===
Lertcheewakarn qualified for the Auckland Open but lost to Heather Watson in the first round, 1–6, 1–6. At the Malaysian Open, she defeated Alberta Brianti, 6–4, 2–6, 6–2, and lost to a qualifier Anne Kremer in the second round. In doubles, Lertcheewakarn reached a WTA tournament final, partnering Jessica Moore, they lost to Dinara Safina and Galina Voskoboeva in a close match. She lost in the first round of the Baku Cup to Ksenia Pervak, having led 5–3 in the third set.

At the US Open, Lertcheewakarn qualified for her second Grand Slam main draw, defeating Zuzana Kučová, Ashley Weinhold and Kristýna Plíšková in three tough matches. In the first round, in just her second Grand Slam tournament, she lost to Anastasiya Yakimova 0–6, 6–4, 3–6. Lertcheewakarn won the Al Habtoor Challenge, beat Bojana Jovanovski, Regina Kulikova, Simona Halep and Kristina Mladenovic en route. She also qualified for HP Open but lost to Samantha Stosur in three sets, she was two points away to score the victory. In 2011, Lertcheewakarn broke into top 100 in doubles and top 150 in singles.

=== 2012 ===
She reached the final of the $50k event in Gifu but lost to Kimiko Date-Krumm, in three sets. She qualified for the Birmingham Classic main draw, defeating Sesil Karatantcheva en route. In the first round, she lost to Misaki Doi in three sets. At the Stanford Classic, Lertcheewakarn lost to Nicole Gibbs, 4–6, 4–6.

== WTA Tour finals ==
=== Doubles: 1 (runner-up) ===
Legend Grand Slam tournaments Premier M & Premier 5 Premier International (0–1)	Finals by surface Hard (0–1) Grass (0–0) Clay (0–0) Carpet (0–0)

Result	Date	Tournament	Surface	Partner	Opponents	Score
Loss	6 March 2011	Malaysian Open	Hard	(Australia) Jessica Moore	(Russia) Dinara Safina (Kazakhstan) Galina Voskoboeva	5–7, 6–2, [5–10]

== WTA Challenger finals ==
=== Doubles: 1 (runner–up) ===
Result	W–L	Date	Tournament	Surface	Partner	Opponents	Score
Loss	0–1	Nov 2012	Royal Indian Open, India	Hard	(Israel) Julia Glushko	(Russia) Nina Bratchikova (Georgia (country)) Oksana Kalashnikova	0–6, 6–4, [8–10]

== ITF Circuit finals ==
=== Singles: 14 (5 titles, 9 runner–ups) ===
Legend $75,000 tournaments $50,000 tournaments $25,000 tournaments $10,000 tournaments	Finals by surface Hard (5–9)

Result	W–L	Date	Tournament	Tier	Surface	Opponent	Score
Loss	0–1	Jun 2007	ITF Jakarta, Indonesia	10,000	Hard	(Thailand) Nungnadda Wannasuk	3–6, 6–4, 6–3
Loss	0–2	Jul 2007	ITF Bangkok, Thailand	10,000	Hard	(China) Lu Jiaxiang	6–2, 2–6, 7–6^{(5)}
Win	1–2	May 2008	ITF Balikpapan, Indonesia	25,000	Hard	(India) Isha Lakhani	6–3, 6–2
Win	2–2	Aug 2008	ITF Chiang Mai, Thailand	10,000	Hard	(Thailand) Nungnadda Wannasuk	6–2, 6–3
Loss	2–3	Mar 2009	ITF Hamilton, New Zealand	10,000	Hard	(Indonesia) Ayu Fani Damayanti	6–4, 4–6, 6–3
Loss	2–4	Jul 2010	ITF Saint Joseph, United States	10,000	Hard	(Venezuela) Gabriela Paz	6–1, 6–4
Win	3–4	Sep 2010	ITF Tsukuba, Japan	25,000	Hard	(Japan) Shiho Akita	6–4, 6–1
Loss	3–5	Sep 2010	ITF Cairns, Australia	25,000	Hard	(Brazil) Ana Clara Duarte	6–3, 3–6, 6–2
Win	4–5	Dec 2011	Dubai Tennis Challenge, UAE	75,000	Hard	(France) Kristina Mladenovic	7–5, 6–4
Loss	4–6	Sep 2012	ITF Phuket, Thailand	25,000	Hard	(Germany) Dinah Pfizenmaier	6–2, 6–4
Loss	4–7	Apr 2012	Kangaroo Cup Gifu, Japan	50,000	Hard	(Japan) Kimiko Date-Krumm	6–1, 5–7, 6–3
Loss	4–8	Oct 2013	Bendigo International, Australia	50,000	Hard	(Australia) Casey Dellacqua	4–6, 4–6
Loss	4–9	Mar 2014	Blossom Cup, China	50,000	Hard	(Kazakhstan) Zarina Diyas	1–6, 1–6
Win	5–9	May 2016	ITF Sharm El Sheikh, Egypt	10,000	Hard	(India) Prerna Bhambri	6–4, 6–1

=== Doubles: 18 (8 titles, 10 runner–ups) ===
Legend $100,000 tournaments $50,000 tournaments $25,000 tournaments $10,000 tournaments	Finals by surface Hard (6–9) Clay (1–1) Grass (1–0)

Result	No.	Date	Tournament	Surface	Partner	Opponents	Score
Win	1.	26 September 2006	ITF Jakarta, Indonesia	Hard	(Thailand) Varatchaya Wongteanchai	(Indonesia) Lavinia Tananta (Indonesia) Ayu Fani Damayanti	6–2, 6–4
Win	2.	19 November 2006	ITF Manila, Philippines	Hard	(Thailand) Varatchaya Wongteanchai	(Chinese Taipei) Kao Shao-yuan (Thailand) Thassha Vitayaviroj	3–6, 6–3, 7–6^{(2)}
Loss	1.	17 June 2007	ITF Montemor-o-Novo, Portugal	Hard	(Thailand) Varanya Vijuksanaboon	(Italy) Elisa Balsamo (Italy) Valentina Sulpizio	6–1, 6–0
Loss	2.	27 July 2007	ITF Bangkok, Thailand	Hard	(Thailand) Napaporn Tongsalee	(Thailand) Sophia Mulsap (Thailand) Varatchaya Wongteanchai	4–6, 6–4, 6–1
Win	3.	24 April 2009	ITF Bol, Croatia	Clay	(Czech Republic) Martina Borecká	(Slovakia) Michaela Pochabová (Slovakia) Patrícia Verešová	6–3, 6–3
Loss	3.	15 May 2010	ITF Tanjung Selor, Indonesia	Hard	(Indonesia) Jessy Rompies	(China) Liu Wanting (Hong Kong) Zhang Ling	7–6^{(5)}, 6–3
Loss	4.	31 July 2010	ITF St. Joseph, United States	Hard	(Venezuela) Gabriela Paz	(United States) Maria Sanchez (United States) Ellen Tsay	6–4, 4–6, [5–10]
Loss	5.	11 September 2010	ITF Cairns, Australia	Hard	(Australia) Tyra Calderwood	(Australia) Tammi Patterson (Australia) Olivia Rogowska	6–3, 7–6^{(3)}
Loss	6.	25 April 2011	Kangaroo Cup, Japan	Hard	(Japan) Erika Sema	(Chinese Taipei) Chan Yung-jan (Chinese Taipei) Chan Hao-ching	6–2, 6–3
Loss	7.	7 August 2011	Vancouver Open, Canada	Hard	(United States) Jamie Hampton	(Czech Republic) Kristýna Plíšková (Czech Republic) Karolína Plíšková	5–7, 6–2, [10–2]
Win	4.	26 March 2012	ITF Phuket, Thailand	Hard	(China) Zheng Saisai	(China) Sun Shengnan (China) Han Xinyun	6–3, 6–3
Win	5.	18 March 2013	ITF Ipswich, Australia	Hard	(Thailand) Varatchaya Wongteanchai	(Australia) Viktorija Rajicic (Australia) Storm Sanders	4–6, 6–1, [10–8]
Loss	8.	19 August 2013	Neva Cup St. Petersburg, Russia	Clay	(Poland) Justyna Jegiołka	(Russia) Victoria Kan (Ukraine) Ganna Poznikhirenko	2–6, 0–6
Win	6.	12 October 2013	ITF Margaret River, Australia	Hard	(Australia) Arina Rodionova	(Australia) Monique Adamczak (Australia) Tammi Patterson	6–2, 3–6, [10–8]
Loss	9.	5 May 2014	ITF Incheon, South Korea	Hard	(Turkey) Melis Sezer	(South Korea) Han Na-lae (South Korea) Yoo Mi	1–6, 1–6
Win	7.	20 April 2015	ITF Shenzhen, China	Hard	(China) Lu Jiajing	(South Korea) Han Na-lae (South Korea) Jang Su-jeong	6–4, 7–5
Loss	10.	24 October 2015	ITF Brisbane, Australia	Hard	(Thailand) Varatchaya Wongteanchai	(United States) Lauren Embree (United States) Asia Muhammad	2–6, 6–4, [9–11]
Win	8.	10 March 2017	ITF Mildura, Australia	Grass	(China) Lu Jiajing	(France) Tessah Andrianjafitrimo (France) Shérazad Reix	6–4, 1–6, [10–8]

== Grand Slam tournament performance timelines ==
Key
W	F	SF	QF	#R	RR	Q#	DNQ	A	NH

(W) winner; (F) finalist; (SF) semifinalist; (QF) quarterfinalist; (#R) rounds 4, 3, 2, 1; (RR) round-robin stage; (Q#) qualification round; (DNQ) did not qualify; (A) absent; (NH) not held; (SR) strike rate (events won / competed); (W–L) win–loss record.

=== Singles ===
Tournament	2009	2010	2011	2012	2013	2014	2015	2016	2017	W–L
Australian Open	A	A	Q2	Q1	A	Q1	A	A	A	0–0
French Open	A	A	Q1	Q1	A	A	A	A	A	0–0
Wimbledon	Q1	1R	Q2	Q1	A	A	A	A	A	0–1
US Open	A	A	1R	Q1	A	Q1	A	A	A	0–1
Win–loss	0–0	0–1	0–1	0–0	0–0	0–0	0–0	0–0	0–0	0–2

=== Doubles ===
Tournament	2009	2010	2011	2012	2013	2014	2015	2016	2017	W–L
Australian Open	A	A	A	A	A	A	A	A	A	0–0
French Open	A	A	A	A	A	A	A	A	A	0–0
Wimbledon	A	A	A	1R	A	A	A	A	A	0–1
US Open	A	A	A	A	A	A	A	A	A	0–0
Win–loss	0–0	0–0	0–0	0–1	0–0	0–0	0–0	0–0	0–0	0–1

Preceded by Urszula Radwańska	ITF Junior World Champion; 2008	Succeeded by Kristina Mladenovic
