= Grace Sari Ysidora =

Indonesian tennis player

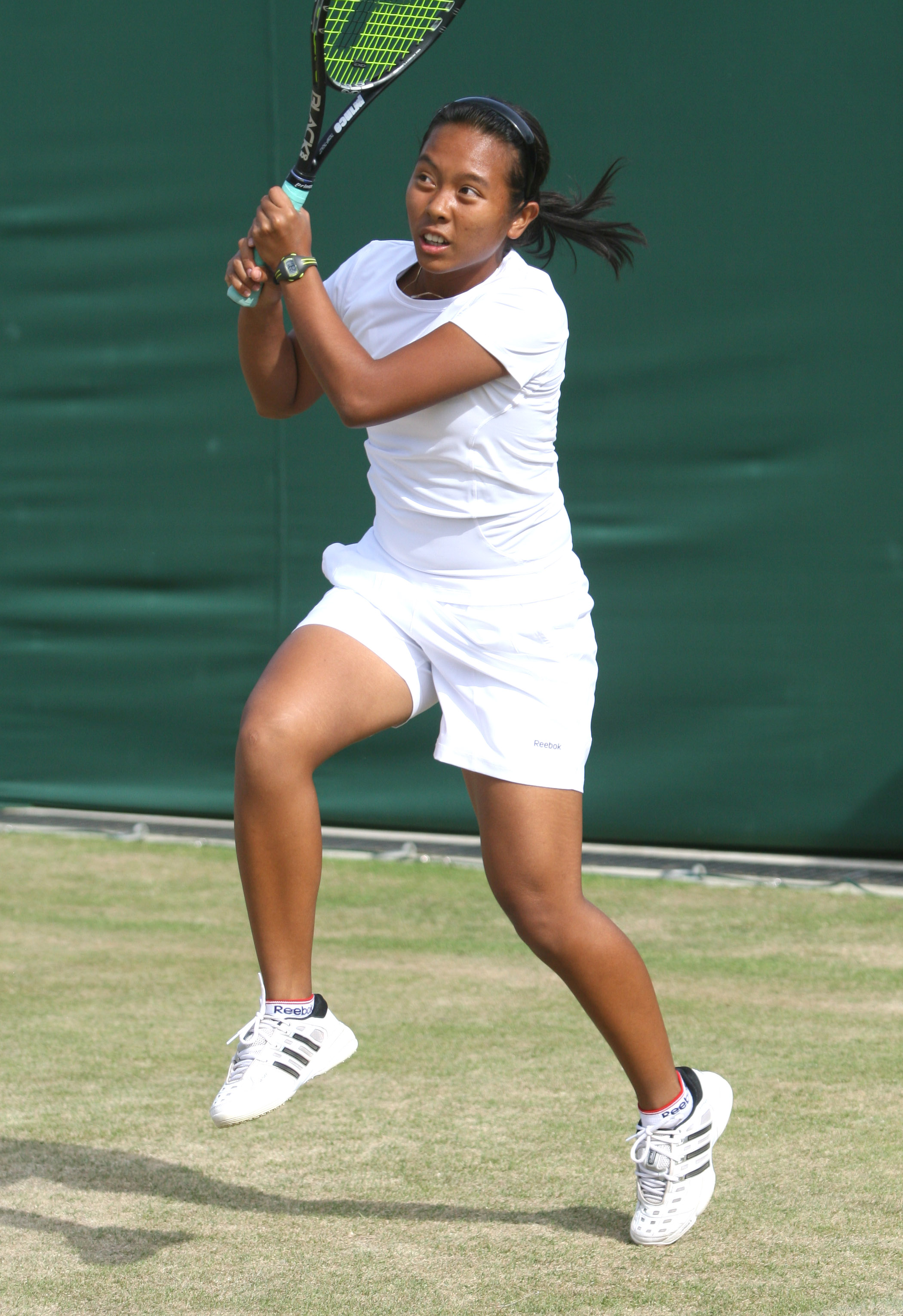
- Country (sports): Indonesia
- Born: 11 May 1993 (age 32) Jakarta, Indonesia
- Plays: Right-handed
- Prize money: $10,049

Singles
- Career record: 30–25
- Career titles: 0
- Highest ranking: No. 607 (10 October 2011)

Doubles
- Career record: 29–20
- Career titles: 2 ITF
- Highest ranking: No. 550 (10 October 2011)
Medal record
Women's Tennis
Representing Indonesia
Southeast Asian Games
Silver medal – second place	2011 Jakarta-Palembang	Team
Bronze medal – third place	2011 Jakarta-Palembang	Mixed doubles

Grace Sari Ysidora (born 11 May 1993) is an Indonesian former tennis player.

She made her debut as a professional in 2008, aged 15, at an ITF tournament in Jakarta. In that year, she reached the final of the women's doubles of the inaugural 2008 Garuda Indonesia Tennis Masters, partnered by Septi Mende. They were defeated by Ayu-Fani Damayanti and Liza Andriyani.

She took part in the girls' competitions at the 2009 French Open, 2009 Wimbledon Championships, 2009 US Open, 2010 Australian Open, 2010 French Open, and 2010 Wimbledon Championships. Her greatest success was in reaching Round 3 at the Australian Open in the girls' singles competition.

Ysidora was Indonesia's sole representative in tennis at the 2010 Summer Youth Olympics.

She won her first ITF title in 2011. In that year, she also won two medals at the 2011 Southeast Asian Games in Palembang: bronze in the mixed doubles event, and silver in the team event.

== ITF Circuit finals ==
$25,000 tournaments
$10,000 tournaments

=== Singles (0–1) ===
Outcome	No.	Date	Tournament	Surface	Opponent	Score
Runner-up	1.	27 July 2009	Jakarta, Indonesia	Hard	(Indonesia) Ayu Fani Damayanti	4–6, 4–6

=== Doubles (2–3) ===
Outcome	No.	Date	Tournament	Surface	Partner	Opponents	Score
Runner-up	1.	4 April 2011	Antalya, Turkey	Hard	(Indonesia) Jessy Rompies	(Russia) Irina Glimakova (Russia) Polina Monova	4–6, 7–6^{(4)}, [8–10]
Runner-up	2.	11 April 2011	Antalya, Turkey	Hard	(Indonesia) Jessy Rompies	(United Kingdom) Lucy Brown (United Kingdom) Francesca Stephenson	4–6, 4–6
Winner	3.	2 May 2011	Bangkok, Thailand	Hard	(Indonesia) Jessy Rompies	(Indonesia) Ayu Fani Damayanti (Indonesia) Lavinia Tananta	3–6, 6–4, [10–5]
Winner	4.	4 June 2011	Surabaya, Indonesia	Hard	(Indonesia) Jessy Rompies	(Indonesia) Sandy Gumulya (Indonesia) Cynthia Melita	6–3, 6–4
Runner-up	5.	25 June 2011	Tarakan, Indonesia	Hard	(Indonesia) Jessy Rompies	(Japan) Moe Kawatoko (Japan) Miki Miyamura	2–6, 5–7
