= Lavinia Tananta =

Indonesian tennis player

- Country (sports): Indonesia
- Born: 3 November 1987 (age 38) Semarang, Indonesia
- Turned pro: 2003
- Plays: Right (two-handed backhand)
- Prize money: $75,112

Singles
- Career record: 195–142
- Career titles: 6 ITF
- Highest ranking: No. 301 (16 August 2010)

Doubles
- Career record: 183–122
- Career titles: 14 ITF
- Highest ranking: No. 218 (4 July 2011)

Team competitions
- Fed Cup: 26–14
Medal record
Women's Tennis
Representing Indonesia
Asian Indoor and Martial Arts Games
Bronze medal – third place	2017 Ashgabat	Doubles
Islamic Solidarity Games
Gold medal – first place	2013 Palembang	Doubles
Gold medal – first place	2013 Palembang	Team
Silver medal – second place	2013 Palembang	Singles
SEA Games
Gold medal – first place	2009 Vientiane	Singles
Silver medal – second place	2009 Vientiane	Team
Silver medal – second place	2011 Jakarta-Palembang	Team
Bronze medal – third place	2015 Singapore	Singles
Bronze medal – third place	2015 Singapore	Team
ASEAN University Games
Gold medal – first place	2014 Palembang	Team

Lavinia Tananta (born 3 November 1987) is an Indonesian former tennis player. She made her debut as a professional in May 2003, aged 15, at an ITF Circuit tournament in Jakarta.

In December 2008, Tananta won the women's singles in the inaugural Garuda Indonesia Tennis Masters, defeating Ayu-Fani Damayanti in the final.

She was part of Indonesia Fed Cup team from 2008 to 2016. The most recent WTA Tour tournament she played in was the 2011 Malaysian Open, partnering compatriot player Jessy Rompies.

Tananta has represented Indonesia at the 2009 and 2015 Southeast Asian Games, winning five medals, including the gold in the women's singles at the 2009 SEA Games at Vientiane.

== ITF finals ==
Legend
$25,000 tournaments
$10,000 tournaments

=== Singles (6–5) ===
Outcome	No.	Date	Tournament	Surface	Opponent	Score
Winner	1.	18 September 2006	Jakarta, Indonesia	Hard	(Indonesia) Ayu-Fani Damayanti	5–7, 6–1, 6–1
Runner-up	1.	5 May 2008	Tarakan, Indonesia	Hard	(China) Liang Chen	7–6^{(7–1)}, 2–6, 3–6
Runner-up	2.	12 May 2008	Bulungan, Indonesia	Hard	(China) Liang Chen	7–6^{(7–5)}, 2–6, 2–6
Winner	2.	10 November 2008	Manila, Philippines	Hard	(Indonesia) Ayu-Fani Damayanti	6–1, 6–4
Winner	3.	3 August 2009	Solo, Indonesia	Hard	(Thailand) Varatchaya Wongteanchai	6–1, 1–6, 6–3
Runner-up	3.	24 August 2009	Nonthaburi, Thailand	Hard	(Hong Kong) Zhang Ling	4–6, 4–6
Winner	4.	2 November 2009	Kuching, Malaysia	Hard	(Indonesia) Jessy Rompies	6–1, 7–5
Winner	5.	12 July 2010	Hat Yai, Thailand	Hard	(Thailand) Nudnida Luangnam	6–4, 3–6, 6–0
Runner-up	4.	26 July 2010	Jakarta, Indonesia	Hard	(Austria) Tina Schiechtl	3–6, 4–6
Winner	6.	7 July 2013	Solo, Indonesia	Hard	(Japan) Yumi Miyazaki	7–5, 6–4
Runner-up	5.	14 June 2014	Solo, Indonesia	Hard	(China) Zhu Lin	0–6, 0–6

=== Doubles (14–17) ===
Outcome	No.	Date	Tournament	Surface	Partner	Opponents	Score
Winner	1.	30 January 2006	Muzaffarnagar, India	Grass	(Singapore) Lee Wei-ping	(Italy) Nicole Clerico (Kyrgyzstan) Ksenia Palkina	w/o
Runner-up	1.	18 September 2006	Jakarta, Indonesia	Hard	(Indonesia) Ayu-Fani Damayanti	(Thailand) Noppawan Lertcheewakarn (Thailand) Varatchaya Wongteanchai	2–6, 4–6
Runner-up	2.	26 September 2006	Jakarta, Indonesia	Hard	(Indonesia) Sandy Gumulya	(Switzerland) Stefania Boffa (Hong Kong) Zhang Ling	4–6, 4–6
Runner-up	3.	20 March 2007	Kalgoorlie, Australia	Hard	(Indonesia) Vivien Silfany-Tony	(Australia) Emily Hewson (Australia) Christina Wheeler	4–6, 3–6
Runner-up	4.	30 April 2007	Jakarta, Indonesia	Hard	(Indonesia) Vivien Silfany-Tony	(Philippines) Denise Dy (Indonesia) Jessy Rompies	0–6, 2–6
Winner	2.	8 May 2007	Tarakan, Indonesia	Hard	(Indonesia) Vivien Silfany-Tony	(Japan) Tomoko Dokei (Japan) Tomoko Taira	6–2, 7–6^{(7–3)}
Runner-up	5.	16 May 2007	Balikpapan, Indonesia	Hard	(Indonesia) Vivien Silfany-Tony	(Indonesia) Septi Mende (Indonesia) Wukirasih Sawondari	6–3, 3–6, 4–6
Winner	3.	28 April 2008	Balikpapan, Indonesia	Hard	(Indonesia) Sandy Gumulya	(Japan) Ayumi Oka (Japan) Tomoko Sugano	6–3, 4–6, [10–7]
Runner-up	6.	12 May 2008	Bulungan, Indonesia	Hard	(China) Hao Jie	(Indonesia) Lutfiana-Aris Budiharto (Indonesia) Beatrice Gumulya	5–7, 6–4, [9–11]
Runner-up	7.	26 May 2008	Bangkok, Thailand	Hard	(Russia) Elina Gasanova	(Indonesia) Yayuk Basuki (Australia) Tiffany Welford	6–2, 6–7^{(7–9)}, [4–10]
Runner-up	8.	28 July 2008	Solo, Indonesia	Hard	(Indonesia) Sandy Gumulya	(Chinese Taipei) Chen Yi (South Korea) Kim Jin-hee	2–6, 4–6
Winner	4.	17 November 2008	Manila, Philippines	Hard	(Indonesia) Jessy Rompies	(Chinese Taipei) Kao Shao-yuan (China) Zheng Junyi	6–1, 5–7, [10–8]
Winner	5.	11 May 2009	Tanjung Selor, Indonesia	Hard	(Indonesia) Ayu-Fani Damayanti	(Indonesia) Beatrice Gumulya (Indonesia) Jessy Rompies	6–1, 6–1
Runner-up	9.	15 June 2009	Pattaya, Thailand	Hard	(Indonesia) Ayu-Fani Damayanti	(Chinese Taipei) Hwang I-hsuan (Chinese Taipei) Juan Ting-fei	4–6, 2–6
Runner-up	10.	24 August 2009	Nonthaburi Thailand	Hard	(Indonesia) Beatrice Gumulya	(Hong Kong) Yang Zijun (Hong Kong) Zhang Ling	4–6, 3–6
Runner-up	11.	31 August 2009	Nonthaburi, Thailand	Hard	(Thailand) Varatchaya Wongteanchai	(Uzbekistan) Albina Khabibulina (Thailand) Kanyapat Narattana	7–5, 4–6, [8–10]
Winner	6.	2 November 2009	Kuching, Malaysia	Hard	(Indonesia) Romana Tedjakusuma	(South Korea) Han Sung-hee (South Korea) Kang Seo-kyung	6–2, 7–5
Winner	7.	3 May 2010	Tarakan, Indonesia	Hard	(Indonesia) Ayu-Fani Damayanti	(China) Liu Wanting (Japan) Mari Tanaka	6–4, 7–5
Runner-up	12.	12 July 2010	Hat Yai, Thailand	Hard	(Indonesia) Ayu-Fani Damayanti	(India) Rushmi Chakravarthi (India) Poojashree Venkatesha	2–6, 6–7^{(10–12)}
Winner	8.	2 August 2010	Balikpapan, Indonesia	Hard	(Indonesia) Ayu-Fani Damayanti	(Chinese Taipei) Chan Hao-ching (Chinese Taipei) Kao Shao-yuan	6–4, 7–5
Runner-up	13.	2 May 2011	Bangkok, Thailand	Hard	(Indonesia) Ayu-Fani Damayanti	(Indonesia) Jessy Rompies (Indonesia) Grace Sari Ysidora	6–3, 4–6, [5–10]
Runner-up	14.	9 May 2011	Bangkok, Thailand	Hard	(Indonesia) Ayu-Fani Damayanti	(China) Li Ting (China) Zhao Yijing	7–6^{(7–2)}, 4–6, [11–13]
Runner-up	15.	28 May 2011	Bangkok, Thailand	Hard	(Indonesia) Ayu-Fani Damayanti	(China) Li Ting (Thailand) Varatchaya Wongteanchai	1–6, 4–6
Runner-up	16.	3 June 2011	Bangkok, Thailand	Hard	(Indonesia) Ayu-Fani Damayanti	(China) Li Ting (Thailand) Varatchaya Wongteanchai	7–5, 6–7^{(5–7)}, [5–10]
Winner	9.	11 June 2011	Jakarta, Indonesia	Hard	(Indonesia) Ayu-Fani Damayanti	(Indonesia) Bella Destriana (Indonesia) Cynthia Melita	7–5, 6–4
Winner	10.	7 September 2012	Rockhampton, Australia	Hard	(Indonesia) Ayu-Fani Damayanti	(Thailand) Nicha Lertpitaksinchai (Thailand) Peangtarn Plipuech	5–7, 7–6^{(7–2)}, [10–8]
Winner	11.	15 September 2012	Salisbury, Australia	Hard	(Indonesia) Ayu-Fani Damayanti	(Australia) Alison Bai (Australia) Sally Peers	7–6^{(7–5)}, 6–0
Winner	12.	3 December 2012	Jakarta, Indonesia	Hard	(Indonesia) Ayu-Fani Damayanti	(China) Lu Jiaxiang (China) Lu Jiajing	6–3, 6–7, [10–6]
Winner	13.	28 June 2013	Bangkok, Thailand	Hard	(Indonesia) Ayu-Fani Damayanti	(Japan) Shiho Akita (Japan) Akari Inoue	1–6, 6–4, [10–6]
Winner	14.	13 July 2013	Solo, Indonesia	Hard	(Indonesia) Ayu-Fani Damayanti	(Indonesia) Beatrice Gumulya (Indonesia) Jessy Rompies	4–6, 6–1, [10–5]
Runner-up	17.	2 September 2013	Yeongwol, South Korea	Hard	(Indonesia) Ayu-Fani Damayanti	(South Korea) Hong Seung-yeon (South Korea) Lee Hye-min	7–5, 2–6, [5–10]
