= Nicha Lertpitaksinchai =

Thai tennis player (born 1991)

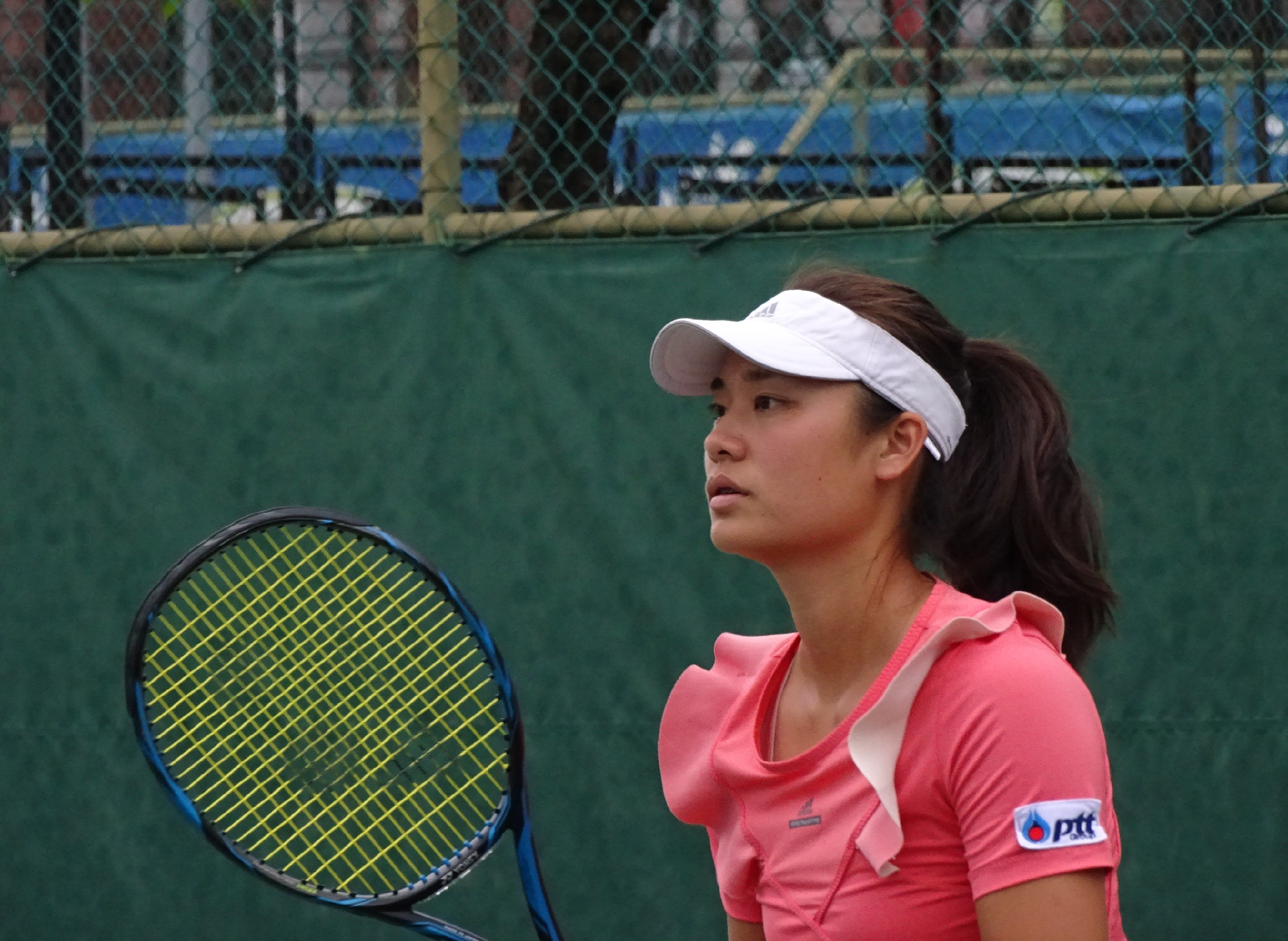
- Native name: ณิชาต์ เลิศพิทักษ์สินชัย
- Country (sports): Thailand
- Residence: Bangkok, Thailand
- Born: 14 August 1991 (age 34) Bangkok
- Height: 1.74 m (5 ft 9 in)
- Retired: 2018
- Plays: Right (two-handed backhand)
- Prize money: $137,659

Singles
- Career record: 204–208
- Career titles: 2 ITF
- Highest ranking: No. 280 (24 October 2016)

Doubles
- Career record: 188–143
- Career titles: 15 ITF
- Highest ranking: No. 144 (21 April 2014)

Team competitions
- Fed Cup: 5–7
Medal record
Women's Tennis
Representing Thailand
Southeast Asian Games
Gold medal – first place	2011 Jakarta-Palembang	Team
Gold medal – first place	2017 Kuala Lumpur	Doubles
Gold medal – first place	2017 Kuala Lumpur	Mixed Doubles
Silver medal – second place	2011 Jakarta-Palembang	Doubles
Bronze medal – third place	2011 Jakarta-Palembang	Singles
Asian Indoor and Martial Arts Games
Gold medal – first place	2017 Ashgabat	Mixed Doubles

Nicha "Eve" Lertpitaksinchai (Thai: ณิชาต์ เลิศพิทักษ์สินชัย; born 14 August 1991) is a former professional tennis player from Thailand.

She has career-high WTA rankings of No. 280 in singles, achieved on 24 October 2016, and 144 in doubles, reached on 21 April 2014.

Lertpitaksinchai had her biggest success at the $50k 2013 Lexington Challenger, where she and Peangtarn Plipuech claimed the doubles title. During her career, she won two singles titles and fifteen doubles titles on the ITF Women's Circuit.

In 2019, she joined The Face Thailand season 5 as one of the contestants of Team Toni.

== WTA Challenger finals ==
=== Doubles: 1 (runner-up) ===
Result	Date	Tournament	Surface	Partner	Opponents	Score
Loss	Sep 2016	Dalian Open, China	Hard	(Indonesia) Jessy Rompies	(Chinese Taipei) Lee Ya-hsuan (Japan) Kotomi Takahata	2–6, 1–6

== ITF finals ==
=== Singles (2–5) ===
Legend $25,000 tournaments $15,000 tournaments $10,000 tournaments	Finals by surface Hard (2–5) Clay (0–0)

Result	No.	Date	Tournament	Surface	Opponent	Score
Loss	1.	3 July 2010	ITF Nonthaburi, Thailand	Hard	(Indonesia) Jessy Rompies	2–6, 5–7
Win	2.	11 December 2010	ITF Bangalore, India	Hard	(Japan) Kumiko Iijima	6–4, 6–3
Loss	2.	2 April 2011	ITF New Delhi, India	Hard	(France) Céline Cattaneo	1–6, 4–6
Loss	3.	17 December 2011	Pune Championships, India	Hard	(China) Lu Jiajing	3–6, 2–6
Loss	4.	9 November 2013	ITF Phuket, Thailand	Hard (i)	(Hong Kong) Zhang Ling	2–6, 6–7^{(7)}
Win	2.	23 May 2015	ITF Bangkok, Thailand	Hard	(Thailand) Peangtarn Plipuech	7–6^{(4)}, 6–2
Loss	5.	2 October 2016	ITF Hua Hin, Thailand	Hard	(Netherlands) Arantxa Rus	6–3, 6–7^{(4)}, 6–7^{(3)}

=== Doubles (15–10) ===
Legend $50,000 tournaments $25,000 tournaments $15,000 tournaments $10,000 tournaments	Finals by surface Hard (14–8) Grass (1–1) Carpet (0–1)

Result	No.	Date	Tournament	Surface	Partner	Opponents	Score
Win	1.	2 October 2011	ITF Jakarta, Indonesia	Hard	(Thailand) Nungnadda Wannasuk	(Chinese Taipei) Kao Shao-yuan (China) Zhao Yijing	6–4, 6–4
Loss	1.	24 June 2012	ITF Goyang, South Korea	Hard	(Thailand) Peangtarn Plipuech	(China) Liu Wanting (China) Sun Shengnan	7–6^{(1)}, 3–6, [7–10]
Win	2.	21 July 2012	ITF Woking, United Kingdom	Hard	(Thailand) Peangtarn Plipuech	(Spain) Yvonne Cavallé Reimers (United Kingdom) Nicola Slater	6–2, 7–5
Loss	2.	19 August 2012	ITF İstanbul, Turkey	Hard	(Thailand) Peangtarn Plipuech	(Japan) Erika Takao (Japan) Remi Tezuka	6–2, 6–7^{(1)}, [3–10]
Loss	3.	9 September 2012	ITF Rockhampton, Australia	Hard	(Thailand) Peangtarn Plipuech	(Indonesia) Ayu Fani Damayanti (Indonesia) Lavinia Tananta	7–5, 6–7^{(2)}, [8–10]
Loss	4.	14 October 2012	ITF Margaret River, Australia	Hard	(Thailand) Peangtarn Plipuech	(Japan) Miyabi Inoue (Japan) Mai Minokoshi	7–6^{(8)}, 6–7^{(3)}, [12–14]
Win	3.	23 February 2013	ITF Muzaffarnagar, India	Grass	(Thailand) Peangtarn Plipuech	(Poland) Justyna Jegiołka (Ukraine) Veronika Kapshay	3–6, 6–4, [10–8]
Win	4.	27 April 2013	ITF Phuket, Thailand	Hard	(Thailand) Peangtarn Plipuech	(United Kingdom) Tara Moore (United Kingdom) Melanie South	6–3, 5–7, [11–9]
Win	5.	4 May 2013	ITF Phuket, Thailand	Hard	(Thailand) Peangtarn Plipuech	(Oman) Fatma Al-Nabhani (Chinese Taipei) Lee Ya-hsuan	6–2, 6–4
Win	6.	27 July 2013	Lexington Challenger, United States	Hard	(Thailand) Peangtarn Plipuech	(Israel) Julia Glushko (South Africa) Chanel Simmonds	7–6^{(5)}, 6–3
Loss	5.	9 September 2013	Incheon Open, South Korea	Hard	(Thailand) Peangtarn Plipuech	(Japan) Miki Miyamura (Japan) Akiko Omae	4–6, 7–6, [9–11]
Loss	6.	14 October 2013	ITF Makinohara, Japan	Grass	(Thailand) Peangtarn Plipuech	(Japan) Eri Hozumi (Japan) Makoto Ninomiya	1–6, 2–6
Win	7.	16 November 2013	ITF Phuket, Thailand	Hard (i)	(Thailand) Peangtarn Plipuech	(China) Lu Jiaxiang (China) Lu Jiajing	3–6, 6–2, [10–8]
Win	8.	2 December 2013	Pune Championships, India	Hard	(Thailand) Peangtarn Plipuech	(United Kingdom) Jocelyn Rae (United Kingdom) Anna Smith	7–5, 7–5
Win	9.	17 February 2014	ITF New Delhi, India	Hard	(Thailand) Peangtarn Plipuech	(Japan) Erika Sema (Japan) Yurika Sema	7–6, 6–3
Win	10.	26 July 2014	ITF Phuket, Thailand	Hard	(Thailand) Peangtarn Plipuech	(South Korea) Han Na-lae (South Korea) Yoo Mi	6–3, 6–7, [11–9]
Loss	7.	30 August 2014	ITF Tsukuba, Japan	Hard	(Thailand) Peangtarn Plipuech	(China) Han Xinyun (China) Zhang Kailin	4–6, 4–6
Win	11.	20 October 2014	ITF Phuket, Thailand	Hard (i)	(Thailand) Peangtarn Plipuech	(Ukraine) Oleksandra Korashvili (Ukraine) Alyona Sotnikova	7–6^{(0)}, 2–6, [10–4]
Win	12.	27 October 2014	ITF Phuket, Thailand	Hard (i)	(Thailand) Peangtarn Plipuech	(Thailand) Kamonwan Buayam (Chinese Taipei) Lee Pei-chi	7–5, 6–3
Loss	8.	10 November 2014	ITF Mumbai, India	Hard	(Thailand) Peangtarn Plipuech	(China) Lu Jiajing (India) Ankita Raina	4–6, 6–1, [9–11]
Loss	9.	31 May 2015	ITF Balikpapan, Indonesia	Hard	(Thailand) Nudnida Luangnam	(United Kingdom) Harriet Dart (India) Prarthana Thombare	4–6, 6–4, [16–18]
Win	13.	26 July 2015	ITF Evansville, United States	Hard	(Thailand) Peangtarn Plipuech	(United States) Lauren Herring (United States) Kennedy Shaffer	6–2, 6–3
Win	14.	27 May 2017	ITF Goyang, South Korea	Hard	(Thailand) Peangtarn Plipuech	(Australia) Genevieve Lorbergs (Australia) Olivia Tjandramulia	7–5, 6–4
Loss	10.	13 November 2017	Toyota World Challenge, Japan	Carpet (i)	(Thailand) Peangtarn Plipuech	(Russia) Ksenia Lykina (Japan) Junri Namigata	6–3, 3–6, [4–10]
Win	15.	14 April 2018	ITF Osaka, Japan	Hard	(South Korea) Choi Ji-hee	(Japan) Akiko Omae (Thailand) Peangtarn Plipuech	6–3, 6–4
