= Tennis at the 2009 SEA Games =

The tennis tournament at the 2009 SEA Games was held from December 11 to December 18 in Vientiane of Laos. The men's and women's tournament have no age limit.

== Medal summary ==
Rank	Nation	Gold	Silver	Bronze	Total
1	Thailand (THA)	4	2	3	9
2	Philippines (PHI)	2	3	5	10
3	Indonesia (INA)	1	2	3	6
4	Cambodia (CAM)	0	0	1	1
4	Malaysia (MAS)	0	0	1	1
4	Vietnam (VIE)	0	0	1	1
Totals (6 entries)		7	7	14	28

== Medalists ==
Event	Gold	Silver	Bronze
Men's team	Philippines Cecil Mamiit; Treat Conrad Huey; Johnny Arcilla; Patrick Tierro	Thailand Danai Udomchoke; Kittipong Wachiramanowong; Sanchai Ratiwatana; Sonchat Ratiwatana	Indonesia Christopher Rungkat; Sunu Wahyu Trijati; Surya Wijaya Budi; Nesa Arta
Men's team	Philippines Cecil Mamiit; Treat Conrad Huey; Johnny Arcilla; Patrick Tierro	Thailand Danai Udomchoke; Kittipong Wachiramanowong; Sanchai Ratiwatana; Sonchat Ratiwatana	Vietnam Hoang Thanh Trung; Đỗ Minh Quân; Le Quoc Khanh; Bu Tri Nguyen
Women's team	Thailand Tamarine Tanasugarn; Suchanun Viratprasert; Nudnida Luangnam; Varatchaya Wongteanchai	Indonesia Ayu-Fani Damayanti; Lavinia Tananta; Sandy Gumulya; Jessy Rompies	Malaysia Jawairiah Noordin; Neesha Thirumalaichelvam; Adelle Boey; Choo Lyn Yee
Women's team	Thailand Tamarine Tanasugarn; Suchanun Viratprasert; Nudnida Luangnam; Varatchaya Wongteanchai	Indonesia Ayu-Fani Damayanti; Lavinia Tananta; Sandy Gumulya; Jessy Rompies	Philippines Riza Zalameda; Denise Dy; Marichris Gentz
Men's singles	Philippines Cecil Mamiit	Philippines Treat Conrad Huey	Thailand Danai Udomchoke
Men's singles	Philippines Cecil Mamiit	Philippines Treat Conrad Huey	Cambodia Tan Nysan
Women's singles	Indonesia Lavinia Tananta	Indonesia Ayu-Fani Damayanti	Philippines Denise Dy
Women's singles	Indonesia Lavinia Tananta	Indonesia Ayu-Fani Damayanti	Philippines Riza Zalameda
Men's doubles	Thailand Sonchat Ratiwatana; Sanchai Ratiwatana	Philippines Treat Conrad Huey; Cecil Mamiit	Indonesia Nesa Arta; Christopher Rungkat
Men's doubles	Thailand Sonchat Ratiwatana; Sanchai Ratiwatana	Philippines Treat Conrad Huey; Cecil Mamiit	Thailand Danai Udomchoke; Kittipong Wachiramanowong
Women's doubles	Thailand Tamarine Tanasugarn; Varatchaya Wongteanchai	Philippines Denise Dy; Riza Zalameda	Indonesia Sandy Gumulya; Jessy Rompies
Women's doubles	Thailand Tamarine Tanasugarn; Varatchaya Wongteanchai	Philippines Denise Dy; Riza Zalameda	Thailand Nudnida Luangnam; Suchanun Viratprasert
Mixed doubles	Thailand Varatchaya Wongteanchai; Sonchat Ratiwatana	Thailand Tamarine Tanasugarn; Sanchai Ratiwatana	Philippines Denise Dy; Cecil Mamiit
Mixed doubles	Thailand Varatchaya Wongteanchai; Sonchat Ratiwatana	Thailand Tamarine Tanasugarn; Sanchai Ratiwatana	Philippines Riza Zalameda; Treat Conrad Huey

== Team ==
=== Men's team ===
==== Overview ====
Quarter-finals
Thailand
Bye
10 December
Malaysia	1
Vietnam	2
10 December
Cambodia	0
Indonesia	3
10 December
Laos	0
Philippines	3

Semi-finals
11 December
Thailand	3
Vietnam	0
11 December
Indonesia	1
Philippines	2

Final
12 December
Thailand	1
Philippines	2

==== Gold-medal match ====
Thailand
1
Centre Court, National Sport complex
December 12, 2009, 14:30 (UTC+7)
Hard (Outdoors)

Philippines
2

			1	2	3
1	(Thailand) (Philippines)	Kittipong Wachiramanowong; Treat Conrad Huey	4; 6	6; 1	6^{2} 7^{7}
2	(Thailand) (Philippines)	Danai Udomchoke; Cecil Mamiit	6; 4	6; 2
3	(Thailand) (Philippines)	Sanchai Ratiwatana / Sonchat Ratiwatana; Treat Conrad Huey / Cecil Mamiit	6; 4	3; 6	6^{4} 7^{7}

=== Women's team ===
==== Overview ====
Quarter-finals
Thailand
Bye
10 December
Vietnam	1
Philippines	2
10 December
Malaysia	3
Cambodia	0
10 December
Laos	0
Indonesia	3

Semi-finals
11 December
Thailand	2
Philippines	1
11 December
Malaysia	0
Indonesia	3

Final
12 December
Thailand	3
Indonesia	0

==== Gold-medal match ====
Thailand
3
Centre Court, National Sport complex
December 12, 2009, 10:30 (UTC+7)
Hard (Outdoors)

Indonesia
0

			1	2	3
1	(Thailand) (Indonesia)	Nudnida Luangnam; Lavinia Tananta	7; 5	6; 1
2	(Thailand) (Indonesia)	Tamarine Tanasugarn; Ayu-Fani Damayanti	6; 2	6; 0
3	(Thailand) (Indonesia)	Suchanun Viratprasert / Varatchaya Wongteanchai; Sandy Gumulya / Jessy Rompies				w/o

== Singles ==
=== Men's singles ===
Preliminary round 13–14 December
(Thailand) Danai Udomchoke
Bye
(Cambodia) Bun Kenny	6	6
(Vietnam) Bui Tri Nguyen	2	2
(Philippines) Treat Conrad Huey	2	6	6
(Indonesia) Sunu Wahyu Trijati	6	3	4
(Laos) Vitaya Lasavady	1	0
(Malaysia) Ariez Elyaas	6	6
(Vietnam) Hoang Thanh Trung	2	1
(Cambodia) Tan Nysan	6	6
(Malaysia) Si Yew Ming	2	1
(Thailand) Kittipong Wachiramanowong	6	6
(Laos) Donedy Keodalasouk	0	0
(Indonesia) Christopher Rungkat	6	6
Bye
(Philippines) Cecil Mamiit

Quarterfinals; 15 December
(Thailand) D. Udomchoke	6	6
(Cambodia) B. Kenny	0	4
(Philippines) T. Huey	6	6
(Malaysia) A. Elyaas	0	3
(Cambodia) T. Nysan	7	7
(Thailand) K. Wachiramanowong	6^{1}	6^{3}
(Indonesia) C. Rungkat	4	0
(Philippines) C. Mamiit	6	6

Semifinals; 16 December
(Thailand) D. Udomchoke	5	6^{6}
(Philippines) T. Huey	7	7
(Cambodia) T. Nysan	1	2
(Philippines) C. Mamiit	6	6

Finals; 18 December
(Philippines) T. Huey	6	2	3
(Philippines) C. Mamiit	4	6	6
Bronze-medal match

=== Women's singles ===
Preliminary round 13–14 December
(Thailand) Suchanun Viratprasert
Bye
(Cambodia) Cheng Sreypich	0	1
(Philippines) Denise Dy	6	6
(Indonesia) Lavinia Tananta	6	6
(Vietnam) Tran Lam Anh	1	0
(Malaysia) Jawairiah Noordin	6	6
(Laos) Dala Nilaxay	0	0
(Vietnam) Hoang Thanh Trung	6	6
(Laos) Daravanh Singthinh	1	0
(Philippines) Riza Zalameda	2	7	6
(Thailand) Nudnida Luangnam	6	5	3
(Cambodia) Cheng Chornay	4	2
(Malaysia) Neesha Thirumalaichelvam	6	6
Bye
(Indonesia) Ayu-Fani Damayanti

Quarterfinals; 15 December
(Thailand) S. Viratprasert	7	2	6^{5}
(Philippines) D. Dy	5	6	7
(Indonesia) L. Tananta	3	6	6
(Malaysia) J. Noordin	6	1	3
(Vietnam) H. T. Thanh	3	3
(Philippines) R. Zalameda	6	6
(Malaysia) N. Thirumalaichelvam	0	0
(Indonesia) A. F. Damayanti	6	6

Semifinals; 16 December
(Philippines) D. Dy	5	4
(Indonesia) L. Tananta	7	6
(Philippines) R. Zalameda	3	2
(Indonesia) A. F. Damayanti	6	6

Finals; 17 December
(Indonesia) L. Tananta	5	6
(Indonesia) A. F. Damayanti	7	3	Ret.
Bronze-medal match

== Doubles ==
=== Men's doubles ===
Preliminary round 13 December
(Thailand) Sonchat Ratiwatana (Thailand) Sanchai Ratiwatana
Bye
(Philippines) Johnny Arcilla (Philippines) Patrick Tierro	6	6
(Vietnam) Bui Tri Nguyen (Vietnam) Hoang Thanh Trun	3	2
(Indonesia) Nesa Arta (Indonesia) Christopher Rungkat	6	6
(Laos) Donedy Keodalasouk (Laos) Vitaya Lasavady	1	3
(Cambodia) Ek Chamroeun (Cambodia) Orn Sambath	2	1
(Malaysia) Adam Jaya (Malaysia) Si Yew Ming	6	6
(Malaysia) Ariez Elyaas (Malaysia) Razlan Rawi	6	6
(Laos) Phaphithak Somchay (Laos) Xayalath Singthinh	3	0
(Cambodia) Bun Kenny (Cambodia) Tan Nysan	2	2
(Thailand) Danai Udomchoke (Thailand) Kittipong W.	6	6
(Indonesia) Surya Wijaya Budi (Indonesia) Sunu Wahyu Trijati	3	6	5
(Vietnam) Le Quoc Khanh (Vietnam) Do Minh Quan	6	2	10
Bye
(Philippines) Treat Conrad Huey (Philippines) Cecil Mamiit

Quarterfinals; 14 December
(Thailand) S. Ratiwatana (Thailand) S. Ratiwatana	6	6
(Philippines) J. Arcilla (Philippines) P. Tierro	2	3
(Indonesia) N. Arta (Indonesia) C. Rungkat	6	6
(Malaysia) A. Jaya (Malaysia) S. Y. Ming	3	1
(Malaysia) A. Elyaas (Malaysia) R. Rawi	5	0
(Thailand) D. Udomchoke (Thailand) Kittipong W.	7	6
(Vietnam) L. Q. Khanh (Vietnam) D. M. Quan	4	4
(Philippines) T. Huey (Philippines) C. Mamiit	6	6

Semifinals; 15 December
(Thailand) S. Ratiwatana (Thailand) S. Ratiwatana	6	6
(Indonesia) N. Arta (Indonesia) C. Rungkat	2	4
(Thailand) D. Udomchoke (Thailand) Kittipong W.	5	6^{2}
(Philippines) T. Huey (Philippines) C. Mamiit	7	7

Finals; 17 December
(Thailand) S. Ratiwatana (Thailand) S. Ratiwatana	6	5	10
(Philippines) T. Huey (Philippines) C. Mamiit	2	7	8
Bronze-medal match

=== Women's doubles ===
Preliminary round 13 December
(Thailand) Tamarine Tanasugarn (Thailand) Varatchaya Wongteanchai
Bye
(Cambodia) Cheng Chornay (Cambodia) Cheng Sreypich	1	1
(Vietnam) Tran Lam Anh (Vietnam) Huynh Mai Huynh	6	6
(Indonesia) Sandy Gumulya (Indonesia) Jessy Rompies
Bye
(Laos) Dala Nilaxay (Laos) Daravanh Singthinh	1	3
(Philippines) Marichris Gentz (Philippines) Anna Patrimonio	6	6
(Malaysia) Adeley Boey (Malaysia) Choo Lyn Yee	0	1
(Thailand) Nudnida Luangnam (Thailand) Suchanun Viratprasert	6	6
Bye
(Vietnam) Nguyen Thuy Dung (Vietnam) Huynh Phuong Trang
(Philippines) Denis Dy (Philippines) Riza Zalameda
Bye
Bye
(Indonesia) Ayu-Fani Damayanti (Indonesia) Lavinia Tananta

Quarterfinals; 15 December
(Thailand) T. Tanasugarn (Thailand) V. Wongteanchai	6	6
(Vietnam) T. L. Anh (Vietnam) H. M. Huynh	2	1
(Indonesia) S. Gumulya (Indonesia) J. Rompies	6	6
(Philippines) M. Gentz (Philippines) A. Patrimonio	1	4
(Thailand) N. Luangnam (Thailand) S. Viratprasert	6	6
(Vietnam) N. T. Dung (Vietnam) H. P. Trang	3	3
(Philippines) D. Dy (Philippines) R. Zalameda	6	6^{8}	10
(Indonesia) A. F. Damayanti (Indonesia) L. Tananta	3	7^{10}	5

Semifinals; 16 December
(Thailand) T. Tanasugarn (Thailand) V. Wongteanchai	6	6
(Indonesia) S. Gumulya (Indonesia) J. Rompies	1	0
(Thailand) N. Luangnam (Thailand) S.Viratprasert	6	6^{7}	0
(Philippines) D. Dy (Philippines) R. Zalameda	3	7^{9}	10

Finals; 17 December
(Thailand) T. Tanasugarn (Thailand) V. Wongteanchai	7	6
(Philippines) D. Dy (Philippines) R. Zalameda	5	4

=== Mixed doubles ===
Preliminary round 13–14 December
(Thailand) Tamarine Tanasugarn (Thailand) Sanchai Ratiwatana
Bye
(Malaysia) Jawairiah Noordin (Malaysia) Adam Jaya	6	6
(Cambodia) Cheng Chornay (Cambodia) Ek Chamroeun	1	0
(Indonesia) Jessy Rompies (Indonesia) Nesa Arta	5	7	10
(Vietnam) Nguyen Thuy Dung (Vietnam) Le Quoc Khanh	7	5	6
(Laos) Daravanh Singthinh (Laos) Donedy Keodalasouk	0	0
(Philippines) Denise Dy (Philippines) Cecil Mamiit	6	6
(Malaysia) Neesha Thirumalaichelvam (Malaysia) Razlan Rawi	1	3
(Vietnam) Huynh Mai Huynh (Vietnam) Do Minh Quan	6	6
(Laos) Dala Nilaxay (Laos) Vitaya Lasavady	2	1
(Thailand) Varatchaya Wongteanchai (Thailand) Sonchat Ratiwatana	6	6
(Cambodia) Cheng Chornay (Cambodia) Orn Sambath	1	1
(Indonesia) Sandy Gumulya (Indonesia) Christopher Rungkat	6	6
Bye
(Philippines) Riza Zalameda (Philippines) Treat Conrad Huey

Quarterfinals; 16 December
(Thailand) T. Tanasugarn (Thailand) S. Ratiwatana	6	7
(Malaysia) J. Noordin (Malaysia) A. Jaya	1	5
(Indonesia) J. Rompies (Indonesia) N. Arta	4	6^{3}
(Philippines) D. Dy (Philippines) C. Mamiit	6	7
(Vietnam) H. M. Huynh (Vietnam) D. M. Quan	6	1	2
(Thailand) V. Wongteanchai (Thailand) S.Ratiwatana	3	6	10
(Indonesia) S. Gumulya (Indonesia) C. Rungkat	4	4
(Philippines) R. Zalameda (Philippines) T. Huey	6	6

Semifinals; 17 December
(Thailand) T. Tanasugarn (Thailand) S. Ratiwatana	6	6
(Philippines) D. Dy (Philippines) C. Mamiit	4	2
(Thailand) V. Wongteanchai (Thailand) S.Ratiwatana	3	6	10
(Philippines) R. Zalameda (Philippines) T. Huey	6	3	8

Finals; 18 December
(Thailand) T. Tanasugarn (Thailand) S. Ratiwatana	2	6	8
(Thailand) V. Wongteanchai (Thailand) S.Ratiwatana	6	3	10

Preceded by 2007	Tennis at the SEA Games; 2009 SEA Games	Succeeded by 2011
