= Tennis at the 2009 SEA Games – Mixed doubles =

Mixed doubles
- Tennis at the 2009 SEA Games

Events
| Singles | men | women |
| Doubles | men | women | mixed |
| Team | men | women |
| ← 2007 · | SEA Games | · 2011 → |

Tamarine Tanasugarn and Sanchai Ratiwatana from Thailand won the competition.

== Seeds ==
1. (Thailand) Tamarine Tanasugarn / (Thailand) Sanchai Ratiwatana
2. (Philippines) Riza Zalameda / (Philippines) Treat Conrad Huey

== Draw ==
=== Key ===
- Q = Qualifier
- WC = Wild card
- LL = Lucky loser
- Alt = Alternate
- ITF = ITF entry
- PR = Protected ranking
- SR = Special ranking
- SE = Special exempt
- JE = Junior exempt
- JR = Junior Accelerator Programme entrant
- CO = College Accelerator Programme entrant
- NG = Next Gen Accelerator Program entrant
- w/o = Walkover
- r = Retired
- d = Defaulted

Preliminary Round; 13–14 December
1 | (Thailand) Tamarine Tanasugarn (Thailand) Sanchai Ratiwatana
Bye
(Malaysia) Jawairiah Noordin (Malaysia) Adam Jaya | 6 | 6
(Cambodia) Cheng Chornay (Cambodia) Ek Chamroeun | 1 | 0
(Indonesia) Jessy Rompies (Indonesia) Nesa Arta
(Vietnam) Nguyen Thuy Dung (Vietnam) Le Quoc Khanh
(Laos) Daravanh Singthinh (Laos) Donedy Keodalasouk
(Philippines) Denise Dy (Philippines) Cecil Mamiit
(Malaysia) Neesha Thirumalaichelvam (Malaysia) Razlan Rawi
(Vietnam) Huynh Mai Huynh (Vietnam) Do Minh Quan
(Laos) Dala Nilaxay (Laos) Vitaya Lasavady
(Thailand) Varatchaya Wongteanchai (Thailand) Sonchat Ratiwatana
(Cambodia) Cheng Chornay (Cambodia) Orn Sambath | 1 | 1
(Indonesia) Sandy Gumulya (Indonesia) Christopher Rungkat | 6 | 6
Bye
2 | (Philippines) Riza Zalameda (Philippines) Treat Conrad Huey

Quarterfinals
(Thailand) Tamarine Tanasugarn (Thailand) Sanchai Ratiwatana
(Malaysia) Jawairiah Noordin (Malaysia) Adam Jaya
(Indonesia) Sandy Gumulya (Indonesia) Christopher Rungkat
(Philippines) Riza Zalameda (Philippines) Treat Conrad Huey

Semifinals

Finals
Bronze Medal Match
