= Tennis at the 2009 SEA Games – Men's doubles =

Men's doubles
- Tennis at the 2009 SEA Games

Events
| Singles | men | women |
| Doubles | men | women | mixed |
| Team | men | women |
- SEA Games

Sanchai Ratiwatana and Sonchat Ratiwatana from Thailand won the competition.

== Seeds ==
1. (Thailand) Sanchai Ratiwatana / (Thailand) Sonchat Ratiwatana
2. (Philippines) Treat Conrad Huey / (Philippines) Cecil Mamiit

== Draw ==
Key

- Q = Qualifier
- WC = Wild card
- LL = Lucky loser
- Alt = Alternate
- ITF = ITF entry
- PR = Protected ranking
- SR = Special ranking
- SE = Special exempt
- JE = Junior exempt
- JR = Junior Accelerator Programme entrant
- CO = College Accelerator Programme entrant
- NG = Next Gen Accelerator Program entrant
- w/o = Walkover
- r = Retired
- d = Defaulted

Preliminary Round; 13–14 December
1 | (Thailand) Sanchai Ratiwatana (Thailand) Sonchat Ratiwatana
Bye
(Philippines) Johnny Arcilla (Philippines) Patrick Tierro | 6 | 6
(Vietnam) Bui Tri Nguyen (Vietnam) Hoang Thanh Trun | 3 | 2
(Indonesia) Nesa Arta (Indonesia) Christopher Rungkat | 6 | 6
(Laos) Donedy (Laos) Vitaya | 1 | 3
(Cambodia) Ek Chamroeun (Cambodia) Orn Sambath | 2 | 1
(Malaysia) Adam Jaya (Malaysia) Si Yew Ming | 6 | 6
(Malaysia) Ariez Elyaas (Malaysia) Razlan Rawi | 6 | 6
(Laos) Phaphithak (Laos) Xayalath | 3 | 0
(Cambodia) Bun Kenny (Cambodia) Tan Nysan | 2 | 2
(Thailand) Danai Udomchoke (Thailand) Kittipong Wachiramanowong | 6 | 6
(Indonesia) Surya Wijaya Budi (Indonesia) Sunu Wahyu Trijati | 3 | 6 | 5
(Vietnam) Le Quoc Khanh (Vietnam) Do Minh Quan | 6 | 2 | 10
Bye
2 | (Philippines) Treat Conrad Huey (Philippines) Cecil Mamiit

Quarterfinals
1 | (Thailand) Sanchai Ratiwatana (Thailand) Sonchat Ratiwatana | 6 | 6
(Philippines) Johnny Arcilla (Philippines) Patrick Tierro | 2 | 3
(Indonesia) Nesa Arta (Indonesia) Christopher Rungkat | 6 | 6
(Malaysia) Adam Jaya (Malaysia) Si Yew Ming | 3 | 1
(Malaysia) Ariez Elyaas (Malaysia) Razlan Rawi | 5 | 0
(Thailand) Danai Udomchoke (Thailand) Kittipong Wachiramanowong | 7 | 6
(Vietnam) Le Quoc Khanh (Vietnam) Do Minh Quan | 4 | 4
2 | (Philippines) Treat Conrad Huey (Philippines) Cecil Mamiit | 6 | 6

Semifinals
1 | (Thailand) Sanchai Ratiwatana (Thailand) Sonchat Ratiwatana
(Indonesia) Nesa Arta (Indonesia) Christopher Rungkat
(Thailand) Danai Udomchoke (Thailand) Kittipong Wachiramanowong
2 | (Philippines) Treat Conrad Huey (Philippines) Cecil Mamiit

Finals
Bronze Medal Match
