= Tennis at the 2009 SEA Games – Women's singles =

Women's singles
- Tennis at the 2009 SEA Games

Events
Singles	men	women
Doubles	men	women	mixed
Team	men	women
- SEA Games

Lavinia Tananta of Indonesia won the competition.

== Seeds ==
1. (Thailand) Suchanan Viriyaprasert
2. (Indonesia) Ayu-Fani Damayanti

== Draw ==
Key

- Q = Qualifier
- WC = Wild card
- LL = Lucky loser
- Alt = Alternate
- ITF = ITF entry
- PR = Protected ranking
- SR = Special ranking
- SE = Special exempt
- JE = Junior exempt
- JR = Junior Accelerator Programme entrant
- CO = College Accelerator Programme entrant
- NG = Next Gen Accelerator Program entrant
- w/o = Walkover
- r = Retired
- d = Defaulted

Preliminary Round; 13–14 December
1	(Thailand) Suchanun Viratprasert
Bye
(Cambodia) Cheng Sreypich	0	1
(Philippines) Denise Dy	6	6
(Indonesia) Lavinia Tananta	6	6
(Vietnam) Tran Lam Anh	1	0
(Malaysia) Jawairiah Noordin	6	6
(Laos) Dala Nilaxay	0	0
(Vietnam) Hoang Thanh Trung	6	6
(Laos) Daravanh Singthinh	1	0
(Philippines) Riza Zalameda	2	7	6
(Thailand) Nudnida Luangnam	6	5	3
(Cambodia) Cheng Chornay	4	2
(Malaysia) Neesha Thirumalaichelvam	6	6
Bye
2	(Indonesia) Ayu-Fani Damayanti

Quarterfinals
1	(Thailand) Suchanun Viratprasert
(Philippines) Denise Dy
(Indonesia) Lavinia Tananta
(Malaysia) Jawairiah Noordin
(Vietnam) Hoang Thanh Trung
(Philippines) Riza Zalameda
(Malaysia) Neesha Thirumalaichelvam
2	(Indonesia) Ayu-Fani Damayanti

Semifinals

Finals
Bronze Medal Match
