= Tennis at the 2009 SEA Games – Women's team =

Women's team
- Tennis at the 2009 SEA Games

Events
Singles	men	women
Doubles	men	women	mixed
Team	men	women
- SEA Games

The team from Thailand won the competition.

== Draw ==
Quarterfinals; 10 December
Thailand
bye
Vietnam	1
Philippines	2
Malaysia	3
Cambodia	0
Laos	0
Indonesia	3

Semifinals; 11 December
Thailand	2
Philippines	1
Malaysia	0
Indonesia	3

Final; 12 December
Thailand	2
Indonesia	0

== First round ==
Laos
0
Centre Court, National Sport complex
December 10, 2009, 10:00 (UTC+7)
Hard (Outdoors)

Indonesia
3

			1	2	3
1	(Laos) (Indonesia)	Daravanh Singthinh; Lavinia Tananta	1; 6	1; 6
2	(Laos) (Indonesia)	Dara Nilaxay; Ayu-Fani Damayanti	0; 6	1; 6
3	(Laos) (Indonesia)	Daravanh Singthinh / Dara Nilaxay; Sandy Gumulya / Jessy Rompies	1; 6	0; 6

Malaysia
3
Court 4, National Sport complex
December 10, 2009, 10:00 (UTC+7)
Hard (Outdoors)

Cambodia
0

			1	2	3
1	(Malaysia) (Cambodia)	Jawairiah Noordin; Cheng Sreypich	6; 0	6; 0
2	(Malaysia) (Cambodia)		6; 4	5; 7
3	(Malaysia) (Cambodia)	Adelle Boey / Choo Lyn Yee; Cheng Chornay / Cheng Sreypich	6; 2	6; 4

Vietnam
1
Court 3, National Sport complex
December 10, 2009, 14:00 (UTC+7)
Hard (Outdoors)

Philippines
2

			1	2	3
1	(Vietnam) (Philippines)	Hyunh Phuong Trang; Marichris Gentz	6; 3	6; 4
2	(Vietnam) (Philippines)	Huynh Mai Huynh; Denise Dy	2; 6	1; 6
3	(Vietnam) (Philippines)	Nguyen Thuy Dung / Hyunh Mai Hyunh; Denise Dy / Riza Zalameda	1; 6	1; 6

== Semifinals ==
Thailand
2
Court 3, National Sport complex
December 11, 2009, 10:00 (UTC+7)
Hard (Outdoors)

Philippines
1

			1	2	3
1	(Thailand) (Philippines)	Tamarine Tanasugarn; Riza Zalameda	6; 0	6; 4
2	(Thailand) (Philippines)	Suchanan Viriyaprasert; Denise Dy	3; 6	6; 3	3; 6
3	(Thailand) (Philippines)	Nudnida Luangnam / Varatchaya Wongteanchai; Denise Dy / Riza Zalameda	3; 6	6; 4	6; 3

Malaysia
0
Court 2, National Sport complex
December 11, 2009, 10:00 (UTC+7)
Hard (Outdoors)

Indonesia
3

			1	2	3
1	(Malaysia) (Indonesia)	Neesha Thirumalaichelvam; Ayu-Fani Damayanti	1; 6	0; 6
2	(Malaysia) (Indonesia)	Jawairiah Noordin; Lavinia Tananta	4; 6	3; 6
3	(Malaysia) (Indonesia)	Jawairiah Noordin / Neesha Thirumalaichelvam ? / ?	2; 6	0; 6

=== Gold medal match ===
Thailand
3
Centre Court, National Sport complex
December 12, 2009, 10:30 (UTC+7)
Hard (Outdoors)

Indonesia
0

			1	2	3
1	(Thailand) (Indonesia)	Nudnida Luangnam; Lavinia Tananta	7; 5	6; 1
2	(Thailand) (Indonesia)	Tamarine Tanasugarn; Ayu-Fani Damayanti	6; 2	6; 0
3	(Thailand) (Indonesia)	Suchanun Viratprasert / Varatchaya Wongteanchai; Sandy Gumulya / Jessy Rompies				w/o
