= Tennis at the 2005 SEA Games =

- Venue: Rizal Memorial Tennis Court
- Location: Malate, Manila
- Start date: December 1–4

Tennis at the 2005 Southeast Asian Games took place on several separate courts at the Rizal Memorial Sports Complex in Manila, Philippines. The participants competed for four gold medals.

== Medal table ==
* Host nation (Philippines)

Rank	Nation	Gold	Silver	Bronze	Total
1	Indonesia (INA)	3	4	3	10
2	Philippines (PHI)*	3	1	3	7
3	Thailand (THA)	1	2	6	9
4	Vietnam (VIE)	0	0	2	2
Totals (4 entries)		7	7	14	28

== Medalists ==
Event	Gold	Silver	Bronze
Men's singles	Cecil Mamiit; Philippines	Danai Udomchoke; Thailand	Eric Taino; Philippines
Men's singles	Cecil Mamiit; Philippines	Danai Udomchoke; Thailand	Prima Simpatiaji; Indonesia
Men's doubles	Thailand; Sanchai Ratiwatana; Sonchat Ratiwatana	Philippines; Cecil Mamiit; Eric Taino	Indonesia; Suwandi; Bonit Wiryawan
Men's doubles	Thailand; Sanchai Ratiwatana; Sonchat Ratiwatana	Philippines; Cecil Mamiit; Eric Taino	Indonesia; Prima Simpatiaji; Sunu Wahyu Trijati
Men's team	Philippines; Cecil Mamiit; Eric Taino; Johnny Arcilla; Patrick John Tierro	Indonesia; Prima Simpatiaji; Suwandi; Sunu Wahyu Trijati; Bonit Wiryawan	Vietnam; Đỗ Minh Quân; Ngô Quang Huy; Lê Quốc Khánh
Men's team	Philippines; Cecil Mamiit; Eric Taino; Johnny Arcilla; Patrick John Tierro	Indonesia; Prima Simpatiaji; Suwandi; Sunu Wahyu Trijati; Bonit Wiryawan	Thailand; Sanchai Ratiwatana; Sonchat Ratiwatana; Weerapat Doakmaiklee; Danai Udomchoke
Women's singles	Wynne Prakusya; Indonesia	Romana Tedjakusuma; Indonesia	Suchanan Viratprasert; Thailand
Women's singles	Wynne Prakusya; Indonesia	Romana Tedjakusuma; Indonesia	Napaporn Tongsalee; Thailand
Women's doubles	Indonesia; Wynne Prakusya; Romana Tedjakusuma	Indonesia; Ayu Fani Damayanti; Septi Mende	Philippines; Denise Dy; Riza Zalameda
Women's doubles	Indonesia; Wynne Prakusya; Romana Tedjakusuma	Indonesia; Ayu Fani Damayanti; Septi Mende	Thailand; Montinee Tangphong; Thassha Vitayaviroj
Women's team	Indonesia; Wynne Prakusya; Romana Tedjakusuma; Ayu Fani Damayanti; Septi Mende	Thailand; Suchanun Viratprasert; Napaporn Tongsalee; Montinee Tangphong; Thassha Vitayaviroj	Philippines; Riza Zalameda; Czarina Arevalo; Denise Dy
Women's team	Indonesia; Wynne Prakusya; Romana Tedjakusuma; Ayu Fani Damayanti; Septi Mende	Thailand; Suchanun Viratprasert; Napaporn Tongsalee; Montinee Tangphong; Thassha Vitayaviroj	Vietnam; Ngô Việt Hà; Trần Thị Kim Lợi; Nguyễn Thùy Dung; Huỳnh Mai Huỳnh
Mixed doubles	Philippines; Cecil Mamiit; Riza Zalameda	Indonesia; Suwandi; Wynne Prakusya	Thailand; Sanchai Ratiwatana; Montinee Tangphong
Mixed doubles	Philippines; Cecil Mamiit; Riza Zalameda	Indonesia; Suwandi; Wynne Prakusya	Thailand; Sonchat Ratiwatana; Napaporn Tongsalee
