= Denise Dy =

Filipino tennis player (born 1989)

- Country (sports): Philippines
- Residence: Manila, Philippines
- Born: 16 May 1989 (age 37) San Jose, California, U.S.
- Turned pro: 2004
- Plays: Right-handed (double-handed backhand)
- Prize money: $4,274

Singles
- Career record: 10–14
- Career titles: 0
- Highest ranking: No. 1139 (28 November 2005)

Doubles
- Career record: 19–15
- Career titles: 0 WTA, 2 ITF
- Highest ranking: No. 715 (13 August 2007)

Team competitions
- Fed Cup: 9–6
Medal record
Women's Tennis
Representing Philippines
Southeast Asian Games
Gold medal – first place	2011 Jakarta-Palembang	Mixed Doubles
Gold medal – first place	2015 Singapore	Mixed doubles
Silver medal – second place	2007 Nakhon Ratchasima	Mixed doubles
Silver medal – second place	2009 Vientiane	Doubles
Silver medal – second place	2015 Singapore	Doubles
Silver medal – second place	2015 Singapore	Team
Bronze medal – third place	2005 Manila	Doubles
Bronze medal – third place	2005 Manila	Team
Bronze medal – third place	2007 Nakhon Ratchasima	Doubles
Bronze medal – third place	2007 Nakhon Ratchasima	Team
Bronze medal – third place	2009 Vientiane	Singles
Bronze medal – third place	2009 Vientiane	Mixed doubles
Bronze medal – third place	2009 Vientiane	Team
Bronze medal – third place	2011 Jakarta-Palembang	Team
Bronze medal – third place	2017 Kuala Lumpur	Doubles
Bronze medal – third place	2017 Kuala Lumpur	Mixed doubles

Denise Dy (born 16 May 1989) is a Filipino female professional tennis player. She has been the head women's tennis coach at Fresno State University since 2020.

Dy has career-high WTA rankings of 1139 in singles and 715 in doubles. She won two ITF doubles titles, and 14 medals at the Southeast Asian Games, representing Philippines.

Playing for Philippines in Fed Cup, Dy has a win–loss record of 9–6.

== ITF Circuit finals ==
$100,000 tournaments
$75,000 tournaments
$50,000 tournaments
$25,000 tournaments
$10,000 tournaments

=== Singles (0–1) ===
Result	Date	Tournament	Surface	Opponent	Score
Loss	13 May 2007	Tarakan, Indonesia	Hard (i)	(Russia) Maya Gaverova	3–6, 4–6

=== Doubles (2–1) ===
Result	Date	Tournament	Surface	Partner	Opponents	Score
Win	20 November 2005	Manila, Philippines	Hard	(United States) Riza Zalameda	(Chinese Taipei) Chen Yi (Chinese Taipei) Kao Shao-yuan	6–2, 6–3
Win	6 May 2007	Jakarta, Indonesia	Hard	(Indonesia) Jessy Rompies	(Indonesia) Vivien Silfany-Tony (Indonesia) Lavinia Tananta	6–0, 6–2
Loss	13 July 2007	Khon Kaen, Thailand	Hard	(Thailand) Nungnadda Wannasuk	(Thailand) Sophia Mulsap (Thailand) Varatchaya Wongteanchai	4–6, 2–6

== Fed Cup participation ==
=== Singles ===
Edition	Round	Date	Location	Against	Surface	Opponent	W/L	Score
2005 Fed Cup	Asia/Oceania Zone	April 20, 2005	New Delhi	Turkmenistan	Hard	Inna Gavrilenko	W	6–1, 6–0
2005 Fed Cup	Asia/Oceania Zone	April 21, 2005	New Delhi	Syria	Hard	Hazar Sidki	W	6–0, 6–0
2006 Fed Cup	Asia/Oceania Zone	April 20, 2006	Seoul	India	Hard	Isha Lakhani	L	0–6, 6–7^{(3)}
2006 Fed Cup	Asia/Oceania Zone	April 21, 2006	Seoul	New Zealand	Hard	Ellen Barry	L	1–6, 0–6
2006 Fed Cup	Asia/Oceania Zone	April 22, 2006	Seoul	Chinese Taipei	Hard	Chuang Chia-jung	W	2–6, 6–3, 6–4
2006 Fed Cup	Asia/Oceania Zone	April 23, 2006	Seoul	South Korea	Hard	Chang Kyung-mi	L	3–6, 1–6
2008 Fed Cup	Asia/Oceania Zone	January 31, 2008	Bangkok	Syria	Hard (i)	Line al-Ghannam	W	6–0, 6–2
2008 Fed Cup	Asia/Oceania Zone	February 1, 2008	Bangkok	South Korea	Hard (i)	Lee Ye-ra	L	3–6, 2–6
2008 Fed Cup	Asia/Oceania Zone	February 2, 2008	Bangkok	Singapore	Hard (i)	Stefanie Tan	W	6–2, 6–1

=== Doubles ===
Edition	Round	Date	Location	Against	Surface	Partner	Opponents	W/L	Score
2005 Fed Cup	Asia/Oceania Zone	April 19, 2005	New Delhi	Uzbekistan	Hard	Czarina Arevalo	(Uzbekistan) Akgul Amanmuradova (Uzbekistan) Dilyara Saidkhodjayeva	L	4–6, 4–6
2005 Fed Cup	Asia/Oceania Zone	April 20, 2005	New Delhi	Turkmenistan	Hard	Czarina Arevalo	(Turkmenistan) Ummarahmat Hummetova (Turkmenistan) Almira Hallyeva	W	6–1, 6–0
2005 Fed Cup	Asia/Oceania Zone	April 21, 2005	New Delhi	Syria	Hard	Czarina Arevalo	(Syria) Nivin Kezbari (Syria) Hazar Sidki	W	6–1, 6–1
2006 Fed Cup	Asia/Oceania Zone	April 22, 2006	Seoul	Chinese Taipei	Hard	Czarina Arevalo	(Chinese Taipei) Chan Yung-jan (Chinese Taipei) Chuang Chia-jung	L	3–6, 1–6
2008 Fed Cup	Asia/Oceania Zone	January 31, 2008	Bangkok	Syria	Hard (i)	Dianne Matias	(Syria) Lara Alsamman (Syria) Kim Sadi	W	6–1, 6–2
2008 Fed Cup	Asia/Oceania Zone	February 1, 2008	Bangkok	South Korea	Hard (i)	Dianne Matias	(South Korea) Kim So-jung (South Korea) Yu Min-hwa	W	6–1, 6–3
