= Tennis at the 2007 SEA Games =

Tennis at the 2007 SEA Games was held at Tennis Court, His Majesty the King's Birthday 80th Anniversary Stadium (5 December 2007), Nakhon Ratchasima, Thailand.

== Medal tally ==
* Host nation (Thailand)

Rank	Nation	Gold	Silver	Bronze	Total
1	Thailand*	5	2	3	10
2	Indonesia	1	3	3	7
3	Philippines	1	2	4	7
4	Vietnam	0	0	2	2
5	Cambodia	0	0	1	1
5	Malaysia	0	0	1	1
Totals (6 entries)		7	7	14	28

== Medalists ==
Event	Gold	Silver	Bronze
Men's singles	Cecil Mamiit; Philippines	Danai Udomchoke; Thailand	Nysan Tan; Cambodia
Men's singles	Cecil Mamiit; Philippines	Danai Udomchoke; Thailand	Alexander Elbert Sie; Indonesia
Women's singles	Sandy Gumulya; Indonesia	Nudnida Luangnam; Thailand	Romana Tedjakusuma; Indonesia
Women's singles	Sandy Gumulya; Indonesia	Nudnida Luangnam; Thailand	Noppawan Lertcheewakarn; Thailand
Men's doubles	Thailand; Sonchat Ratiwatana; Sanchai Ratiwatana	Philippines; Frederick Taino; Cecil Mamiit	Indonesia; Christopher Rungkat; Alexander Elbert Sie
Men's doubles	Thailand; Sonchat Ratiwatana; Sanchai Ratiwatana	Philippines; Frederick Taino; Cecil Mamiit	Vietnam; Le Quoc Khanh; Đỗ Minh Quân
Women's doubles	Thailand; Tamarine Tanasugarn; Napaporn Tongsalee	Indonesia; Sandy Gumulya; Romana Tedjakusuma	Philippines; Denise Dy; Dianne Matias
Women's doubles	Thailand; Tamarine Tanasugarn; Napaporn Tongsalee	Indonesia; Sandy Gumulya; Romana Tedjakusuma	Thailand; Suchanun Viratprasert; Nungnadda Wannasuk
Mixed doubles	Thailand; Sanchai Ratiwatana; Napaporn Tongsalee	Philippines; Cecil Mamiit; Denise Dy	Philippines; Frederick Taino; Dianne Matias
Mixed doubles	Thailand; Sanchai Ratiwatana; Napaporn Tongsalee	Philippines; Cecil Mamiit; Denise Dy	Thailand; Sonchat Ratiwatana; Tamarine Tanasugarn
Men's team	Thailand; Danai Udomchoke; Sanchai Ratiwatana; Sonchat Ratiwatana; Weerapat Doakmaiklee	Indonesia; Christopher Rungkat; Suwandi; Alexander Elbert Sie	Philippines; Frederick Taino; Patrick John Tierro; Cecil Mamiit; Johnny Arcilla
Men's team	Thailand; Danai Udomchoke; Sanchai Ratiwatana; Sonchat Ratiwatana; Weerapat Doakmaiklee	Indonesia; Christopher Rungkat; Suwandi; Alexander Elbert Sie	Vietnam; Lê Quốc Khánh; Đỗ Minh Quân; Ngô Quang Huy; Trần Thanh Hoàng
Women's team	Thailand; Tamarine Tanasugarn; Suchanun Viratprasert; Nudnida Luangnam; Napaporn Tongsalee	Indonesia; Sandy Gumulya; Romana Tedjakusuma; Wynne Prakusya; Angelique Widjaja	Malaysia; Sia Huey Teng; Dorothy Chong; Chellapriya Vythinathan; Jawairiah Noordin
Women's team	Thailand; Tamarine Tanasugarn; Suchanun Viratprasert; Nudnida Luangnam; Napaporn Tongsalee	Indonesia; Sandy Gumulya; Romana Tedjakusuma; Wynne Prakusya; Angelique Widjaja	Philippines; Czarina Arevalo; Denise Dy; Dianne Matias; Michelle Pang

== Gold Medal Match - Men's Team ==
Thailand
3
Tennis Court
His Majesty the King's 80th Birthday Anniversary, 5 December 2007 Sports Complex
9 December 2007
Hard (Outdoors)

Indonesia
0

			1	2	3
1	(Thailand) (Indonesia)	Weerapat Doakmaiklee; Christopher Rungkat	6; 2	6; 2
2	(Thailand) (Indonesia)	Danai Udomchoke; Elbert Sie	6; 1	6; 3
3	(Thailand) (Indonesia)	Sanchai Ratiwatana / Sonchat Ratiwatana; Christopher Rungkat / Elbert Sie	6; 2	6; 1

== Gold Medal Match - Women's Team ==
Thailand
2
Tennis Court
His Majesty the King's 80th Birthday Anniversary, 5 December 2007 Sports Complex
9 December 2007
Hard (Outdoors)

Indonesia
1

			1	2	3
1	(Thailand) (Indonesia)	Nudnida Luangnam; Romana Tedjakusuma	6; 2	4; 6	4; 6
2	(Thailand) (Indonesia)	Tamarine Tanasugarn; Sandy Gumulya	5; 7	6; 2	7; 5
3	(Thailand) (Indonesia)	Tamarine Tanasugarn / Napaporn Tongsalee; Wynne Prakusya / Angelique Widjaja	6; 2	6; 4
