= Tennis at the 2009 SEA Games – Men's team =

Men's team
- Tennis at the 2009 SEA Games

Events
Singles	men	women
Doubles	men	women	mixed
Team	men	women
- SEA Games

The team from Philippines won the competition.

== Draw ==
Quarterfinals; 10 December
Thailand
bye
Malaysia	1
Vietnam	2
Cambodia	0
Indonesia	3
Laos	0
Philippines	3

Semifinals; 11 December
Thailand	3
Vietnam	0
Indonesia	1
Philippines	2

Final; 12 December
Thailand	1
Philippines	2

== First round ==
Malaysia
1
Court 1, National Sport complex
December 10, 2009, 10:00 (UTC+7)
Hard (Outdoors)

Vietnam
2

			1	2	3
1	(Malaysia) (Vietnam)	Si Yew Ming; Do Minh Quan	6; 4	4; 6	6; 4
2	(Malaysia) (Vietnam)	Adam Jaya; Hoang Thanh Trung	3; 6	6; 3	3; 6
3	(Malaysia) (Vietnam)	Adam Jaya / Si Yew Ming; Do Minh Quan / Le Quoc Khanh	3; 6	5; 7

Cambodia
0
Court 3, National Sport complex
December 10, 2009, 10:00 (UTC+7)
Hard (Outdoors)

Indonesia
3

			1	2	3
1	(Cambodia) (Indonesia)	Tan Nysan; Christopher Rungkat	0; 6	1; 6
2	(Cambodia) (Indonesia)	Bun Kenny; Sunu Wahyu Trijati	4; 6	4; 6
3	(Cambodia) (Indonesia)	Tan Nysan / Bun Kenny; Nesa Arta / Sunu Wahyu Trijati	1; 6	1; 6

Laos
0
Centre Court, National Sport complex
December 10, 2009, 14:00 (UTC+7)
Hard (Outdoors)

Philippines
3

			1	2	3
1	(Laos) (Philippines)	Donedy Keodarasouk; Treat Conrad Huey	0; 6	0; 6
2	(Laos) (Philippines)	Vitaya Lasavady; Cecil Mamiit	0; 6	0; 6
3	(Laos) (Philippines)	Xayalath Singthinh / Phaphithak Somchay; Johnny Arcilla / Patrick Tierro	0; 6	1; 6

== Semifinals ==
Thailand
3
Centre Court, National Sport complex
December 11, 2009, 10:00 (UTC+7)
Hard (Outdoors)

Vietnam
0

			1	2	3
1	(Thailand) (Vietnam)	Danai Udomchoke; Do Minh Quan	6; 1	6; 1
2	(Thailand) (Vietnam)	Kittipong Wachiramanowong; Hoang Thanh Trung	6; 4	6; 1
3	(Thailand) (Vietnam)	Sonchat Ratiwatana / Sanchai Ratiwatana; Do Minh Quan / Le Quoc Khanh	6; 4	6; 0

Indonesia
1
Court 1, National Sport complex
December 11, 2009, 10:00 (UTC+7)
Hard (Outdoors)

Philippines
2

			1	2	3
1	(Indonesia) (Philippines)	Christopher Rungkat; Cecil Mamiit	4; 6	0; 6
2	(Indonesia) (Philippines)	Sunu Wahyu Trijati; Treat Conrad Huey	3; 6	3; 6
3	(Indonesia) (Philippines)	Sunu Wahyu Trijati / Surya Wijaya Rudi; Johnny Arcilla / Patrick Tierro	6; 2	6; 3

== Gold medal match ==
Thailand
1
Centre Court, National Sport complex
December 12, 2009, 14:30 (UTC+7)
Hard (Outdoors)

Philippines
2

			1	2	3
1	(Thailand) (Philippines)	Kittipong Wachiramanowong; Treat Conrad Huey	4; 6	6; 1	6^{2} 7^{7}
2	(Thailand) (Philippines)	Danai Udomchoke; Cecil Mamiit	6; 4	6; 2
3	(Thailand) (Philippines)	Sanchai Ratiwatana / Sonchat Ratiwatana; Treat Conrad Huey / Cecil Mamiit	6; 4	3; 6	6^{4} 7^{7}
