= Tennis at the 2009 SEA Games – Men's singles =

Men's singles
- Tennis at the 2009 SEA Games

Events
Singles	men	women
Doubles	men	women	mixed
Team	men	women
- SEA Games

Treat Huey from the Philippines won the competition.

== Seeds ==
1. (Thailand) Danai Udomchoke
2. (Philippines) Cecil Mamiit

== Draw ==
Key

- Q = Qualifier
- WC = Wild card
- LL = Lucky loser
- Alt = Alternate
- ITF = ITF entry
- PR = Protected ranking
- SR = Special ranking
- SE = Special exempt
- JE = Junior exempt
- JR = Junior Accelerator Programme entrant
- CO = College Accelerator Programme entrant
- NG = Next Gen Accelerator Program entrant
- w/o = Walkover
- r = Retired
- d = Defaulted

Preliminary Round; 13–14 December
1	(Thailand) Danai Udomchoke
Bye
(Cambodia) Bun Kenny	6	6
(Vietnam) Bui Tri Nguyen	2	2
(Philippines) Treat Huey
(Indonesia) Sunu Wahyu Trijati
(Laos) Vitaya Lasavady	1	0
(Malaysia) Ariez Elyaas	6	6
(Vietnam) Hoang Thanh Trung	2	1
(Cambodia) Tan Nysan	6	6
(Malaysia) Si Yew Ming	2	1
(Thailand) Kittipong Wachiramanowong	6	6
(Laos) Donedy Keodalasouk	0	0
(Indonesia) Christopher Rungkat	6	6
Bye
2	(Philippines) Cecil Mamiit

Quarterfinals
(Thailand) Danai Udomchoke
(Cambodia) Bun Kenny
(Malaysia) Ariez Elyaas
(Cambodia) Tan Nysan
(Thailand) Kittipong Wachiramanowong
(Indonesia) Christopher Rungkat
(Philippines) Cecil Mamiit

Semifinals

Finals
Bronze Medal Match
