= Tennis at the 2009 SEA Games – Women's doubles =

Women's doubles
- Tennis at the 2009 SEA Games

Events
Singles	men	women
Doubles	men	women	mixed
Team	men	women
- SEA Games

Tamarine Tanasugarn and Varatchaya Wongteanchai of Thailand won the competition.

== Seeds ==
1. (Thailand) Tamarine Tanasugarn / (Thailand) Varatchaya Wongteanchai
2. (Philippines) Riza Zalameda / (Philippines) Teart Conard

== Draw ==
Key

- Q = Qualifier
- WC = Wild card
- LL = Lucky loser
- Alt = Alternate
- ITF = ITF entry
- PR = Protected ranking
- SR = Special ranking
- SE = Special exempt
- JE = Junior exempt
- JR = Junior Accelerator Programme entrant
- CO = College Accelerator Programme entrant
- NG = Next Gen Accelerator Program entrant
- w/o = Walkover
- r = Retired
- d = Defaulted

Preliminary Round; 13–14 December
1	(Thailand) Tamarine Tanasugarn (Thailand) Varatchaya Wongteanchai
Bye
(Cambodia) Cheng Chornay (Cambodia) Cheng Sreypich	1	3
(Vietnam) Tran Lam Anh (Vietnam) Huynh Mai Huynh	6	6
(Indonesia) Sandy Gumulya (Indonesia) Jessy Rompies
bye
(Laos) Dala Nilaxay (Laos) Daravanh Singthinh	1	3
(Philippines) Marichris Gentz (Philippines) Anna Patrimonio	6	6
(Malaysia) Adelle Boey (Malaysia) Choo Lyn Yee	0	1
(Thailand) Nudnida Lungnam (Thailand) Suchanun Viratprasert	6	6
bye
(Vietnam) Nguyen Thuy Dung (Vietnam) Huynh Phuong Tra
(Philippines) Denis Dy (Philippines) Riza Zalameda
bye
Bye
2	(Indonesia) Ayu Fani Damayanti (Indonesia) Lavinia Tananta

Quarterfinals
(Thailand) Tamarine Tanasugarn (Thailand) Varatchaya Wongteanchai
(Vietnam) Tran Lam Anh (Vietnam) Huynh Mai Huynh
(Indonesia) Sandy Gumulya (Indonesia) Jessy Rompies
(Philippines) Marichris Gentz (Philippines) Anna Patrimonio
(Thailand) Nudnida Lungnam (Thailand) Suchanun Viratprasert
(Vietnam) Nguyen Thuy Dung (Vietnam) Huynh Phuong Tra
(Philippines) Denis Dy (Philippines) Riza Zalameda
(Indonesia) Ayu Fani Damayanti (Indonesia) Lavinia Tananta

Semifinals

Finals
Bronze Medal Match
