= Cecil Mamiit =

American tennis player (born 1976)

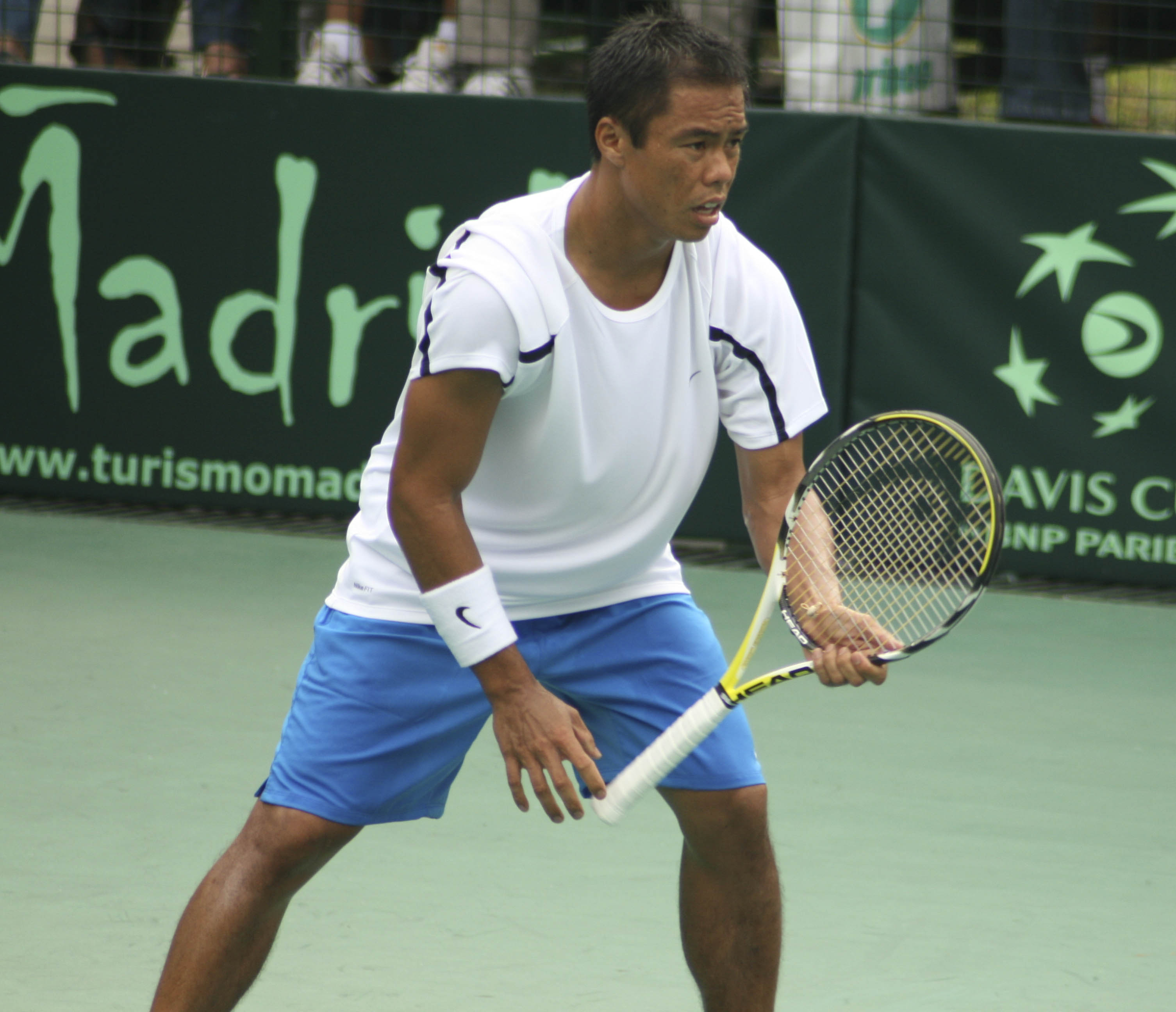
- Mamiit in 2008
- Country (sports): United States; Philippines
- Residence: Los Angeles, California, U.S.
- Born: June 27, 1976 (age 50) Los Angeles, California, U.S.
- Height: 5 ft 8 in (1.73 m)
- Turned pro: 1996
- Retired: 2012
- Plays: Right-handed (two-handed backhand)
- Prize money: $1,084,438

Singles
- Career record: 59–108
- Career titles: 0
- Highest ranking: No. 72 (11 October 1999)

Grand Slam singles results
- Australian Open: 2R (1999, 2001)
- French Open: 2R (2001, 2002)
- Wimbledon: 1R (1999, 2001, 2002)
- US Open: 2R (1999)

Doubles
- Career record: 16–37
- Career titles: 0
- Highest ranking: No. 102 (30 October 2006)

Grand Slam doubles results
- Wimbledon: 1R (2006)
- US Open: 1R (1996, 1999, 2000)

Grand Slam mixed doubles results
- US Open: 1R (1999)
Medal record
Men's Tennis
Representing United States
Pan American Games
Silver medal – second place	1999 Winnipeg	Singles
Representing Philippines
Asian Games
Bronze medal – third place	2006 Doha	Singles
Bronze medal – third place	2006 Doha	Doubles
Southeast Asian Games
Gold medal – first place	2005 Manila	Singles
Gold medal – first place	2005 Manila	Mixed doubles
Gold medal – first place	2005 Manila	Team
Gold medal – first place	2007 Nakhon Ratchasima	Singles
Gold medal – first place	2009 Vientiane	Singles
Gold medal – first place	2009 Vientiane	Team
Silver medal – second place	2005 Manila	Doubles
Silver medal – second place	2007 Nakhon Ratchasima	Doubles
Silver medal – second place	2007 Nakhon Ratchasima	Mixed doubles
Silver medal – second place	2009 Vientiane	Doubles
Silver medal – second place	2011 Jakarta–Palembang	Doubles
Silver medal – second place	2011 Jakarta–Palembang	Team
Bronze medal – third place	2007 Nakhon Ratchasima	Team
Bronze medal – third place	2009 Vientiane	Mixed doubles
Bronze medal – third place	2011 Jakarta–Palembang	Singles
- Last updated on: 30 April 2022.

Cecil Valdeavilla Mamiit (born June 27, 1976) is a former tennis player from the United States who went on to represent the Philippines. He began his professional career in 1996 and reached his highest individual ranking in the ATP Tour on October 11, 1999 as World No. 72.

== Career ==
In 1996, he won the NCAA singles championship as an USC freshman, a feat that had not been achieved since John McEnroe attended Stanford University in 1978.

Mamiit won the silver medal in the men's tournament at the 1999 Pan American Games in Winnipeg, Manitoba, Canada, after losing the final to fellow American Paul Goldstein. At the 2006 Asian Games held in Doha, Qatar, he won bronze in the singles event after losing in the semifinals to Lee Hyung Taik of South Korea. In the doubles event, he also won bronze, along with fellow Filipino-American tennis player Eric Taino, losing to the first-seeded and former World no. 1 doubles players Mahesh Bhupathi and Leander Paes of India. He won the men's singles in the Ojai Tennis Tournament in 2008.

His best tournament result came at the 1999 San Jose tournament. As a qualifier he defeated Danish Kenneth Carlsen, Americans Andre Agassi (although Agassi was up 6–0, 6–6 before he defaulted), Australian Mark Woodforde, and another American Michael Chang before losing in the final to another Aussie Mark Philippoussis 6–3, 6–2.

Mamiit represented the Philippines Davis Cup team, where he was undefeated until 2008.

From January 2011, through the clay court season, he was the hitting partner for Russian Maria Sharapova, where she won the 2012 French Open to complete her Career Grand Slam.

== ATP career finals ==
=== Singles: 1 (1 runner-up) ===
Legend Grand Slam Tournaments (0–0) ATP World Tour Finals (0–0) ATP Masters 1000 Series (0–0) ATP 500 Series (0–0) ATP 250 Series (0–1)	Finals by surface Hard (0–1) Clay (0–0) Grass (0–0) Carpet (0–0)	Finals by setting Outdoors (0–1) Indoors (0–0)

Result	W–L	Date	Tournament	Tier	Surface	Opponent	Score
Loss	0–1	Feb 1999	San Jose, United States	World Series	Hard	(Australia) Mark Philippoussis	3–6, 2–6

== ATP Challenger and ITF Futures finals ==
=== Singles: 17 (9–8) ===
Legend ATP Challenger (7–8) ITF Futures (2–0)	Finals by surface Hard (8–6) Clay (1–2) Grass (0–0) Carpet (0–0)

Result	W–L	Date	Tournament	Tier	Surface	Opponent	Score
Loss	0-1	Sep 1997	Urbana, United States	Challenger	Hard	(United Kingdom) Andrew Richardson	7–6, 6–7, 3–6
Win	1-1	Jun 1998	USA F4, Tallahassee	Futures	Clay	(Brazil) Egberto Caldas	6–4, 6–2
Win	2-1	Jun 1998	USA F5, Lafayette	Futures	Hard	(Chile) Nicolás Massú	0–6, 6–3, 6–0
Win	3-1	Jul 1998	Aptos, United States	Challenger	Hard	(Japan) Takao Suzuki	6–7, 6–3, 6–2
Win	4-1	Nov 1998	Las Vegas, United States	Challenger	Hard	(Venezuela) Maurice Ruah	7–5, 6–3
Loss	4-2	Nov 1998	Rancho Mirage, United States	Challenger	Hard	(Norway) Christian Ruud	7–6, 3–6, 2–6
Win	5-2	Nov 1998	Burbank, United States	Challenger	Hard	(South Africa) David Nainkin	7–6, 7–5
Win	6-2	Dec 1999	Burbank, United States	Challenger	Hard	(United States) Alex O'Brien	7–5, 6–3
Loss	6-3	Jul 2000	Granby, Canada	Challenger	Hard	(Japan) Takao Suzuki	4–6, 3–6
Loss	6-4	Nov 2000	Rancho Mirage, United States	Challenger	Hard	(United States) James Blake	6–3, 4–6, 2–6
Loss	6-5	Apr 2002	Calabases, United States	Challenger	Hard	(United States) Michael Chang	3–6, 5–7
Loss	6-6	May 2002	Birmingham, United States	Challenger	Clay	(United States) Alex Kim	6–7^{(9–11)}, 2–6
Win	7-6	Jun 2004	Tallahassee, United States	Challenger	Hard	(Sweden) Bjorn Rehnquist	6–4, 4–6, 7–5
Loss	7-7	Jan 2005	Waikoloa, United States	Challenger	Hard	(United States) Paul Goldstein	2–6, 2–6
Win	8-7	Jun 2005	Yuba City, United States	Challenger	Hard	(United States) Paul Goldstein	6–4, 6–4
Loss	8-8	May 2006	Forrest Hills, United States	Challenger	Clay	(United States) Robert Kendrick	2–6, 2–6
Win	9-8	Sep 2006	New Orleans, United States	Challenger	Hard	(United States) Amer Delic	6–3, 7–6^{(7–1)}

=== Doubles: 18 (10–8) ===
Legend ATP Challenger (8–8) ITF Futures (2–0)	Finals by surface Hard (8–7) Clay (2–1) Grass (0–0) Carpet (0–0)

Result	W–L	Date	Tournament	Tier	Surface	Partner	Opponents	Score
Loss	0-1	May 1997	Dresden, Germany	Challenger	Clay	(Venezuela) Jimy Szymanski	(United States) Mark Merklein (United States) Jeff Salzenstein	6–7, 1–6
Win	1-1	Mar 1998	Philippines F1, Manila	Futures	Hard	(United States) Eric Taino	(France) Maxime Boye (France) Thierry Guardiola	4–6, 6–2, 6–1
Win	2-1	Jun 1998	USA F4, Tallahassee	Futures	Clay	(United Kingdom) Kyle Spencer	(Canada) Jocelyn Robichaud (United States) Michael Russell	3–6, 6–2, 6–1
Loss	2-2	Dec 1999	Burbank, United States	Challenger	Hard	(United States) Scott Humphries	(United States) Mike Bryan (United States) Bob Bryan	6–7, 7–5, 1–6
Loss	2-3	Jan 2000	Waikoloa, United States	Challenger	Hard	(United States) James Blake	(United States) Jim Grabb (United States) Richey Reneberg	2–6, 6–2, 4–6
Loss	2-4	Nov 2004	Nashville, United States	Challenger	Hard	(Thailand) Danai Udomchoke	(United States) Jason Marshall (United States) Travis Parrott	3–6, 4–6
Win	3-4	Mar 2005	Ho Chi Minh City, Vietnam	Challenger	Hard	(United States) Eric Taino	(Pakistan) Aisam Qureshi (Ukraine) Orest Tereshchuk	6–3, 2–6, 6–4
Win	4-4	Aug 2005	Bronx, United States	Challenger	Hard	(United States) Brian Vahaly	(France) Julien Benneteau (France) Nicolas Mahut	6–4, 6–4
Win	5-4	Jan 2006	Waikoloa, United States	Challenger	Hard	(Germany) Michael Kohlmann	(United States) Scott Lipsky (United States) David Martin	6–3, 6–4
Win	6-4	Mar 2006	Ho Chi Minh City, Vietnam	Challenger	Hard	(Chinese Taipei) Lee Hyung-Taik	(Sweden) Jacob Adaktusson (Israel) Dudi Sela	6–4, 6–2
Win	7-4	May 2006	Forest Hills, United States	Challenger	Clay	(United States) Chris Drake	(United States) Eric Butorac (United States) Mirko Pehar	6–4, 6–1
Loss	7-5	Jun 2006	Busan, South Korea	Challenger	Hard	(United States) Robert Kendrick	(United States) Scott Lipsky (United States) Todd Widom	3–6, 7–6^{(7–2)}, [7–10]
Win	8-5	Jul 2006	Winnetka, United States	Challenger	Hard	(United States) Eric Taino	(United States) Scoville Jenkins (United States) Rajeev Ram	6–2, 6–4
Win	9-5	Sep 2006	New Orleans, United States	Challenger	Hard	(United States) Sam Warburg	(United States) Chris Drake (United States) David Martin	7–6^{(7–3)}, 6–0
Win	10-5	Oct 2006	Calabasas, United States	Challenger	Hard	(United States) Robert Kendrick	(Israel) Harel Levy (United States) Sam Warburg	5–7, 4–6, [10–5]
Loss	10-6	Apr 2007	Valencia, United States	Challenger	Hard	(Philippines) Eric Taino	(Israel) Harel Levy (United States) Sam Warburg	2–6, 4–6
Loss	10-7	Jul 2007	Aptos, United States	Challenger	Hard	(United States) John-Paul Fruttero	(United States) Rajeev Ram (United States) Bobby Reynolds	7–6^{(7–5)}, 3–6, [7–10]
Loss	10-8	Oct 2007	Calabasas, United States	Challenger	Hard	(United States) Robert Kendrick	(United States) John Isner (United States) Brian Wilson	6–7^{(10–12)}, 6–4, [8–10]

== Performance timelines ==
Key
W	F	SF	QF	#R	RR	Q#	DNQ	A	NH

(W) winner; (F) finalist; (SF) semifinalist; (QF) quarterfinalist; (#R) rounds 4, 3, 2, 1; (RR) round-robin stage; (Q#) qualification round; (DNQ) did not qualify; (A) absent; (NH) not held; (SR) strike rate (events won / competed); (W–L) win–loss record.

=== Singles ===
Tournament	1994	1995	1996	1997	1998	1999	2000	2001	2002	2003	2004	2005	2006	2007	SR	W–L	Win %
Grand Slam tournaments
Australian Open	A	A	A	Q2	A	2R	1R	2R	1R	1R	1R	Q1	Q1	A	0 / 6	2–6	25%
French Open	A	A	A	Q2	Q1	1R	Q1	2R	2R	1R	Q1	Q1	Q2	A	0 / 4	2–4	33%
Wimbledon	A	A	A	Q1	A	1R	A	1R	1R	Q2	Q2	A	Q1	A	0 / 3	0–3	0%
US Open	Q1	Q2	1R	1R	Q1	2R	1R	Q1	Q1	Q1	Q2	Q2	Q1	A	0 / 4	1–4	20%
Win–loss	0–0	0–0	0–1	0–1	0–0	2–4	0–2	2–3	1–3	0–2	0–1	0–0	0–0	0–0	0 / 17	5–17	23%
ATP World Tour Masters 1000
Indian Wells	A	A	1R	Q1	A	Q2	Q1	1R	Q1	Q1	Q1	Q1	A	Q1	0 / 2	0–2	0%
Miami	A	A	A	Q2	A	2R	Q1	2R	Q2	Q2	A	A	A	A	0 / 2	2–2	50%
Canada	A	A	A	1R	1R	A	1R	1R	Q2	A	A	A	A	A	0 / 4	0–4	0%
Cincinnati	A	A	A	A	Q2	1R	1R	1R	Q1	A	A	A	A	A	0 / 3	0–3	0%
Win–loss	0–0	0–0	0–1	0–1	0–1	1–2	0–2	1–4	0–0	0–0	0–0	0–0	0–0	0–0	0 / 11	2–11	15%

=== Doubles ===
Tournament	1995	1996	1997	1998	1999	2000	2001	2002	2003	2004	2005	2006	SR	W–L	Win %
Grand Slam tournaments
Australian Open	A	A	A	A	A	A	A	A	A	A	A	A	0 / 0	0–0	–
French Open	A	A	A	A	A	A	A	A	A	A	A	A	0 / 0	0–0	–
Wimbledon	A	A	A	A	A	A	A	A	Q2	A	A	1R	0 / 1	0–1	0%
US Open	Q1	1R	A	A	1R	1R	A	A	A	A	A	A	0 / 3	0–3	0%
Win–loss	0–0	0–1	0–0	0–0	0–1	0–1	0–0	0–0	0–0	0–0	0–0	0–1	0 / 4	0–4	0%
ATP World Tour Masters 1000
Indian Wells	A	A	A	A	1R	A	A	A	A	A	A	A	0 / 1	0–1	0%
Miami	A	A	A	A	Q2	A	1R	A	A	A	A	A	0 / 1	0–1	0%
Canada	A	A	A	A	A	1R	A	A	A	A	A	A	0 / 1	0–1	0%
Win–loss	0–0	0–0	0–0	0–0	0–1	0–1	0–1	0–0	0–0	0–0	0–0	0–0	0 / 3	0–3	0%
