= Riza Zalameda =

American-Filipino tennis player

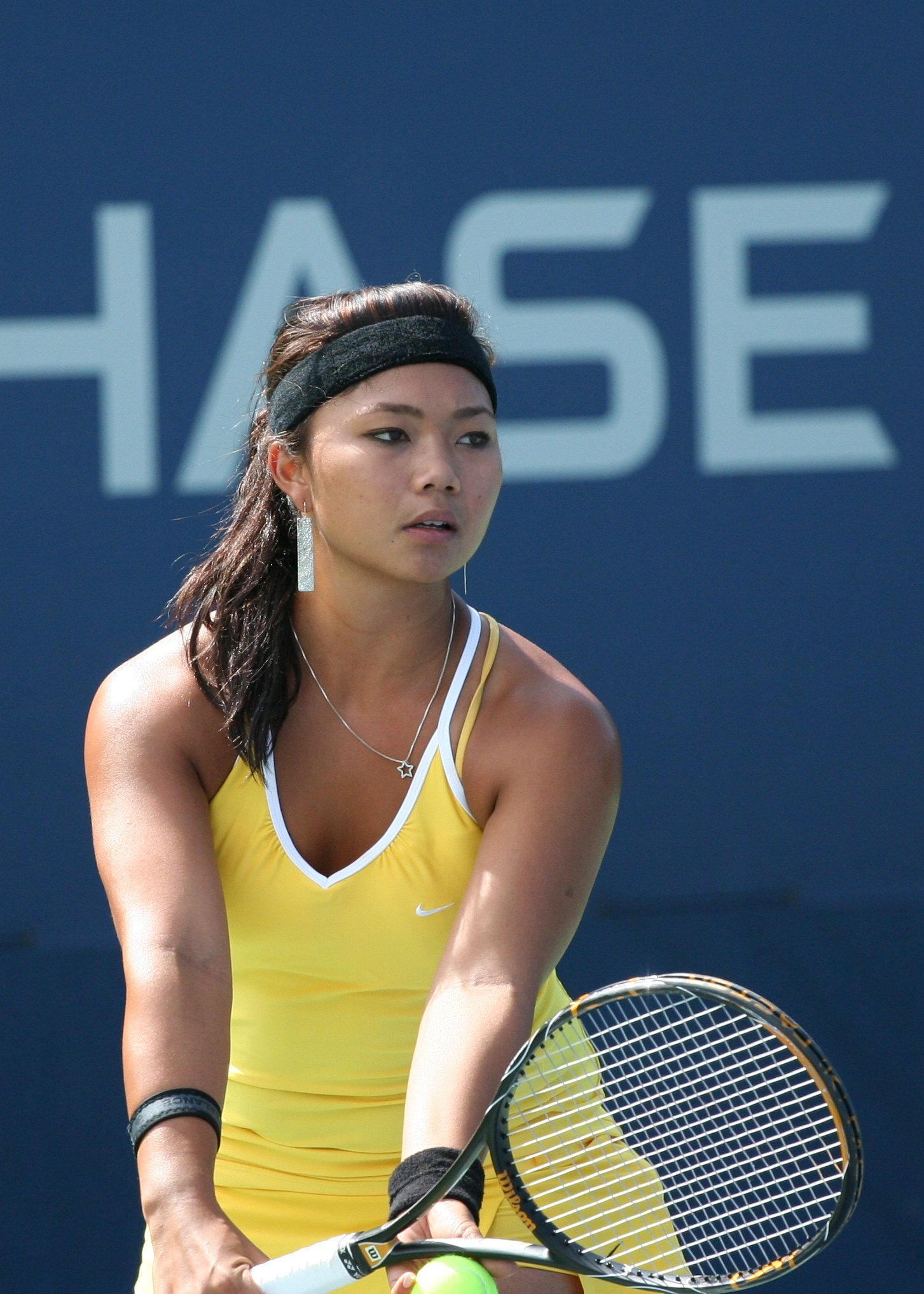
- Zalameda at the 2009 US Open
- Full name: Riza Angela Zalameda
- Country (sports): United States; Philippines
- Residence: Los Angeles, California, U.S.
- Born: February 10, 1986 (age 40) Los Angeles, California, U.S.
- Turned pro: 2008
- Retired: 2011
- Plays: Right-handed (one-handed backhand)
- Prize money: $92,160

Singles
- Career record: 29–45
- Career titles: 2 ITF
- Highest ranking: No. 534 (July 24, 2006)

Doubles
- Career record: 77–70
- Career titles: 6 ITF
- Highest ranking: No. 76 (April 12, 2010)

Grand Slam doubles results
- French Open: 1R (2010)
- Wimbledon: 1R (2010)
- US Open: 2R (2004, 2008)

Grand Slam mixed doubles results
- US Open: 1R (2008)
Medal record
Women's Tennis
Representing Philippines
Southeast Asian Games
| Gold medal – first place | 2005 Manila | Mixed doubles |
| Silver medal – second place | 2009 Vientiane | Doubles |
| Bronze medal – third place | 2005 Manila | Doubles |
| Bronze medal – third place | 2005 Manila | Team |
| Bronze medal – third place | 2009 Vientiane | Singles |
| Bronze medal – third place | 2009 Vientiane | Mixed doubles |
| Bronze medal – third place | 2009 Vientiane | Team |

Riza Angela Zalameda (born February 10, 1986) is an American-Filipino former tennis player.

From 2004 to 2008, she attended and represented UCLA on the Division I women's tennis team. Zalameda is a former NCAA national champion in the doubles and team events, and four-time All-American in singles and doubles.

Upon graduating with a degree in Anthropology, she played on the WTA Tour. From 2012 to 2016, Zalameda served as the assistant coach for Columbia University's Division I women's tennis program in New York City. Then, from 2016 to 2018, she led the newly fully funded tennis program at Seton Hall University in South Orange, New Jersey.

Currently, Zalameda is the tennis coach at Necker Island in the British Virgin Islands.

== Biography ==
Riza was born to Filipino parents Rolly and Angie Zalameda in Los Angeles. She started playing tennis at five and was coached by her father, Rolly.

Zalameda played mainly on tournaments of the ITF Women's Circuit where she won two singles and six doubles titles. Her career-high WTA rankings are No. 534 in singles (achieved in July 2006) and No. 76 in doubles (set in April 2010). She was runner-up at the doubles event of the Taipei Ladies Open in 2009 with Yayuk Basuki, her greatest success.

Zalameda also won seven medals at the Southeast Asian Games, representing the Philippines.

She retired from pro circuit 2011.

== ITF Circuit finals ==
Legend
$100,000 tournaments
$75,000 tournaments
$50,000 tournaments
$25,000 tournaments
$10,000 tournaments

=== Singles (2–0) ===
| Result | No. | Date | Tournament | Surface | Opponent | Score |
|---|---|---|---|---|---|---|
| Win | 1. | 15 November 2005 | ITF Manila, Philippines | Hard (i) | (Hong Kong) Venise Chan | 6–3, 6–2 |
| Win | 2. | 27 June 2006 | ITF Edmond, United States | Hard | (United States) Alexa Glatch | 6–4, 6–1 |

=== Doubles (6–6) ===
| Result | No. | Date | Tournament | Surface | Partner | Opponents | Score |
|---|---|---|---|---|---|---|---|
| Loss | 1. | 28 May 2002 | ITF Louisville, United States | Hard | (United States) Ashley Kroh | (United States) Beau Jones (United States) Kristina Kraszewski | 3–6, 6–1, 0–6 |
| Loss | 2. | 19 May 2003 | ITF El Paso, United States | Hard | (United States) Anne Yelsey | (United States) Beau Jones (Latvia) Anžela Žguna | 0–6, 6–7^{(4)} |
| Loss | 3. | 23 March 2004 | ITF Redding, United States | Hard | (United States) Lilia Osterloh | (United States) Jennifer Hopkins (United States) Mashona Washington | 2–6, 4–6 |
| Win | 4. | 15 November 2005 | ITF Manila, Philippines | Hard | (Philippines) Denise Dy | (Chinese Taipei) Chen Yi (Chinese Taipei) Kao Shao-yuan | 6–2, 6–3 |
| Loss | 5. | 6 April 2009 | ITF Jackson, United States | Clay | (United States) Laura Granville | (Australia) Monique Adamczak (Russia) Arina Rodionova | 3–6, 4–6 |
| Win | 6. | 17 May 2009 | ITF Raleigh, United States | Clay | (United States) Lilia Osterloh | (Germany) Carmen Klaschka (Germany) Sabine Klaschka | 6–0, 6–0 |
| Win | 7. | 31 May 2009 | Carson Challenger, United States | Hard | (United States) Laura Granville | (Australia) Monique Adamczak (Australia) Nicole Kriz | 6–3, 6–4 |
| Win | 8. | 12 July 2009 | ITF Grapevine, United States | Hard | (United States) Lindsay Lee-Waters | (United States) Kimberly Couts (Canada) Valérie Tétreault | 7–6^{(7)}, 6–3 |
| Win | 9. | 8 August 2009 | Vancouver Open, Canada | Hard | (United States) Ahsha Rolle | (United States) Madison Brengle (United States) Lilia Osterloh | 6–4, 6–3 |
| Win | 10. | 27 September 2009 | ITF Albuquerque, United States | Hard | (United States) Mashona Washington | (Hungary) Melinda Czink (United States) Lindsay Lee-Waters | 6–3, 6–2 |
| Loss | 11. | 8 November 2009 | Taipei Ladies Open, Taiwan | Hard (i) | (Indonesia) Yayuk Basuki | (Chinese Taipei) Chan Yung-jan (Chinese Taipei) Chuang Chia-jung | 3–6, 6–3, [7–10] |
| Loss | 12. | 2 April 2010 | ITF Monzón, Spain | Hard | (Indonesia) Yayuk Basuki | (Romania) Alexandra Dulgheru (Thailand) Tamarine Tanasugarn | 2–6, 0–6 |
