= Varatchaya Wongteanchai =

Thai tennis player

Varatchaya Wongteanchai วรัชญา วงค์เทียนชัย
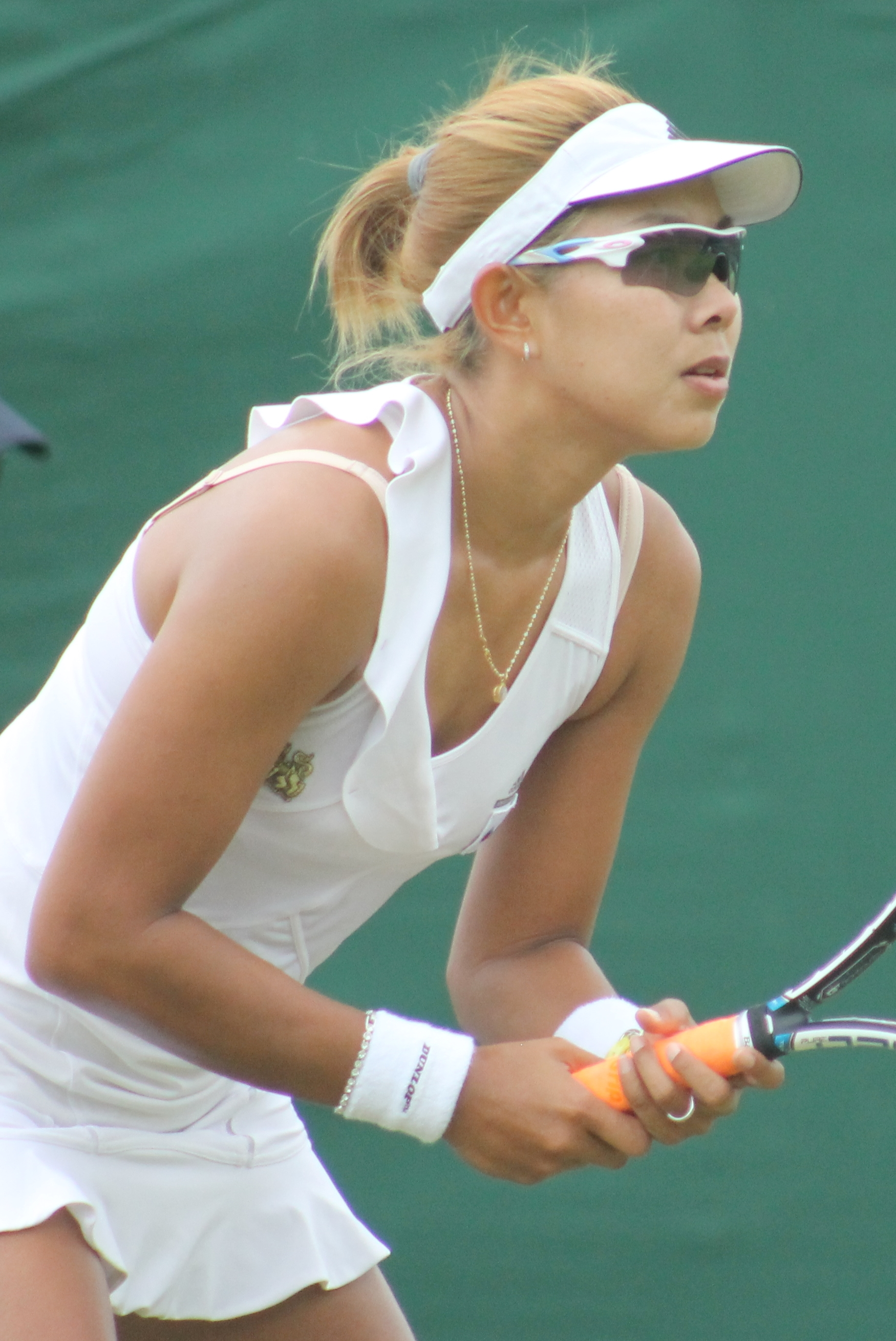
- Country (sports): Thailand
- Residence: Bangkok, Thailand
- Born: 7 September 1989 (age 36) Chiang Rai, Thailand
- Height: 1.69 m (5 ft 7 in)
- Turned pro: 2006
- Retired: 2019
- Plays: Right-handed (two-handed backhand)
- Coach: Bobby Wongteanchai
- Prize money: $299,061

Singles
- Career record: 293–246
- Career titles: 4 ITF
- Highest ranking: No. 200 (20 July 2015)

Doubles
- Career record: 352–219
- Career titles: 2 WTA, 31 ITF
- Highest ranking: No. 77 (12 September 2016)

Grand Slam doubles results
- Australian Open: 1R (2017)
- Wimbledon: 2R (2017)
- US Open: 1R (2016)
Medal record
Women's tennis
Representing Thailand
Asian Games
| Bronze medal – third place | 2010 Guangzhou | Team |
Southeast Asian Games
| Gold medal – first place | 2009 Vientiane | Doubles |
| Gold medal – first place | 2009 Vientiane | Mixed doubles |
| Gold medal – first place | 2009 Vientiane | Team |
| Gold medal – first place | 2011 Jakarta-Palembang | Team |
| Gold medal – first place | 2015 Singapore | Doubles |
| Gold medal – first place | 2015 Singapore | Team |
| Silver medal – second place | 2011 Jakarta-Palembang | Doubles |
| Silver medal – second place | 2015 Singapore | Singles |
Summer Universiade
| Gold medal – first place | 2011 Shenzhen | Team |
| Gold medal – first place | 2017 Taipei | Single |
| Silver medal – second place | 2013 Kazan | Doubles |
| Bronze medal – third place | 2011 Shenzhen | Mixed doubles |

Varatchaya "Pias" Wongteanchai (Thai: วรัชญา วงค์เทียนชัย; born 7 September 1989) is a former professional tennis player from Thailand.

In her career, she won two doubles titles on the WTA Tour, with four singles titles and 31 doubles titles on the ITF Women's Circuit. On 20 July 2015, she reached her best singles ranking of world No. 200. On 12 September 2016, she peaked at No. 77 in the doubles rankings.

Playing for Thailand Fed Cup team, Wongteanchai has accumulated a win–loss record of 10–6.

Her younger sister Varunya Wongteanchai is also a tennis professional.

== Career ==
In February 2012, Wongteanchai made her WTA Tour main-draw debut at her home tournament, the Pattaya Open. She qualified for the main draw by defeating Hsu Wen-hsin in three, and Misa Eguchi in straight sets. She then faced top-seed Vera Zvonareva in the first round but lost in two sets by 2–6, 5–7. She also partnered her younger sister Varunya in the doubles event, but they lost in the quarterfinals.

In 2013, Wongteanchai started her year by winning a title at the Blossom Cup. It was her most important title so far. She was then awarded a wildcard into the Pattaya Open, where she defeated Annika Beck 6–3, 6–3 but lost to Marina Erakovic in the second round. In the doubles event, Wongteanchai partnered with her sister Varunya. In the first round, they defeated the third seeds Chan Yung-jan and Chan Hao-ching as well as Irina Buryachok and Valeria Solovyeva. They then lost to Akgul Amanmuradova and Alexandra Panova in the semifinals. She also played in the qualifying event of the 2013 Roland Garros but lost to Grace Min in the first round.

Partnering Jessica Moore, Wongteanchai won the doubles title at the 2016 Bucharest Open, defeating Alexandra Cadanțu and Katarzyna Piter in the final in straight sets.

== WTA Tour finals ==
=== Doubles: 2 (titles) ===
| Legend Grand Slam tournament Premier M & Premier 5 Premier International (2–0) | Finals by surface Hard (1–0) Clay (1–0) Grass (0–0) Carpet (0–0) |

| Result | W–L | Date | Tournament | Tier | Surface | Partner | Opponents | Score |
|---|---|---|---|---|---|---|---|---|
| Win | 1–0 | Mar 2016 | Malaysian Open | International | Hard | (China) Yang Zhaoxuan | (China) Liang Chen (China) Wang Yafan | 4–6, 6–4, [10–7] |
| Win | 2–0 | Jul 2016 | Bucharest Open, Romania | International | Clay | (Australia) Jessica Moore | (Romania) Alexandra Cadanțu (Poland) Katarzyna Piter | 6–3, 7–6^{(5)} |

== WTA Challenger finals ==
=== Doubles: 1 (runner–up) ===
| Result | W–L | Date | Tournament | Surface | Partner | Opponents | Score |
|---|---|---|---|---|---|---|---|
| Loss | 0–1 | Nov 2015 | Hua Hin Challenger, Thailand | Hard | (China) Yang Zhaoxuan | (China) Liang Chen (China) Wang Yafan | 3–6, 4–6 |

== ITF finals ==
=== Singles: 7 (4–3) ===
| Legend $100,000 tournaments $75,000 tournaments $50,000 tournaments $25,000 tournaments $10,000 tournaments | Finals by surface Hard (4–2) Clay (0–1) |

| Result | No. | Date | Tournament | Surface | Opponent | Score |
|---|---|---|---|---|---|---|
| Loss | 1. | 27 June 2009 | ITF Bangkok, Thailand | Hard | (Japan) Ai Yamamoto | 1–6, 1–6 |
| Loss | 2. | 9 August 2009 | ITF Solo, Indonesia | Hard | (Indonesia) Lavinia Tananta | 1–6, 6–1, 3–6 |
| Loss | 3. | 18 February 2011 | ITF Aurangabad, India | Clay | (Uzbekistan) Vlada Ekshibarova | 1–6, 4–6 |
| Win | 1. | 25 February 2011 | ITF Mumbai, India | Hard | (Uzbekistan) Vlada Ekshibarova | 2–6, 6–4, 6–1 |
| Win | 2. | 19 June 2011 | ITF Balikpapan, Indonesia | Hard | (China) Wang Qiang | 7–5, 6–3 |
| Win | 3. | 25 June 2011 | ITF Pattaya, Thailand | Hard | (Russia) Anna Tyulpa | 6–4, 6–1 |
| Win | 4. | 11 January 2013 | Blossom Cup, China | Hard | (Ukraine) Nadiya Kichenok | 6–2, 6–7^{(5)}, 7–6^{(5)} |

=== Doubles: 61 (31–30) ===
| Legend $100,000 tournaments $75,000 tournaments $50/60,000 tournaments $25,000 tournaments $10,000 tournaments | Finals by surface Hard (27–18) Clay (2–7) Carpet (2–5) |

| Result | No. | Date | Tournament | Surface | Partner | Opponents | Score |
|---|---|---|---|---|---|---|---|
| Win | 1. | 23 July 2006 | ITF Bangkok, Thailand | Hard | (Thailand) Nungnadda Wannasuk | (Chinese Taipei) Chang Kai-chen (Vietnam) Nguyen Thuy Dung | 6–4, 6–4 |
| Win | 2. | 26 September 2006 | ITF Jakarta, Indonesia | Hard | (Thailand) Noppawan Lertcheewakarn | (Indonesia) Lavinia Tananta (Indonesia) Ayu Fani Damayanti | 6–2, 6–4 |
| Win | 3. | 19 November 2006 | ITF Manila, Philippines | Hard | (Thailand) Noppawan Lertcheewakarn | (Chinese Taipei) Kao Shao-yuan (Thailand) Thassha Vitayaviroj | 3–6, 6–3, 7–6^{(2)} |
| Win | 4. | 13 July 2007 | ITF Khon Kaen, Thailand | Hard | (Thailand) Sophia Mulsap | (Philippines) Denise Dy (Thailand) Nungnadda Wannasuk | 6–4, 6–2 |
| Win | 5. | 27 July 2007 | ITF Bangkok, Thailand | Hard | (Thailand) Sophia Mulsap | (Thailand) Noppawan Lertcheewakarn (Thailand) Napaporn Tongsalee | 4–6, 6–4, 6–1 |
| Loss | 1. | 25 August 2007 | ITF Noida, India | Carpet | (Thailand) Sophia Mulsap | (India) Ankita Bhambri (India) Sanaa Bhambri | 1–6, 4–6 |
| Loss | 2. | 31 August 2007 | ITF New Delhi, India | Hard | (Thailand) Sophia Mulsap | (India) Tara Iyer (Thailand) Nungnadda Wannasuk | 4–6, 3–6 |
| Loss | 3. | 4 November 2007 | ITF Kofu, Japan | Hard | (Japan) Ayaka Maekawa | (Japan) Maki Arai (South Korea) Chang Kyung-mi | 7–5, 2–6, [7–10] |
| Win | 6. | 12 November 2007 | ITF Pune, India | Hard | (Hong Kong) Zhang Ling | (Indonesia) Wynne Prakusya (Indonesia) Angelique Widjaja | 1–6, 7–5, [10–5] |
| Win | 7. | 19 November 2007 | ITF Aurangabad, India | Clay | (India) Sandhya Nagaraj | (India) Ankita Bhambri (India) Sanaa Bhambri | 7–6^{(4)}, 7–5 |
| Win | 8. | 28 March 2008 | ITF Wellington, New Zealand | Hard | (Japan) Ayaka Maekawa | (Japan) Tomoko Dokei (Japan) Etsuko Kitazaki | 6–1, 6–3 |
| Loss | 4. | 13 July 2008 | ITF Tokyo, Japan | Carpet | (Japan) Ayumi Oka | (South Korea) Chang Kyung-mi (South Korea) Chae Kyung-yee | 6–3, 2–6, [7–10] |
| Loss | 5. | 16 August 2008 | ITF Chiang Mai, Thailand | Hard | (Thailand) Sophia Mulsap | (China) Chen Yanchong (Chinese Taipei) Chen Yi | 5–7, 3–6 |
| Win | 9. | 20 September 2008 | ITF Kyoto, Japan | Carpet (i) | (Japan) Ayumi Oka | (Japan) Maki Arai (Japan) Yurina Koshino | 5–7, 6–2, [10–2] |
| Loss | 6. | 21 March 2009 | ITF Hamilton, New Zealand | Hard | (Indonesia) Jessy Rompies | (South Korea) Kim So-jung (Japan) Ayaka Maekawa | 5–7, 3–6 |
| Loss | 7. | 24 May 2009 | ITF Nagano, Japan | Carpet | (Japan) Tomoyo Takagishi | (Japan) Junri Namigata (Japan) Akiko Yonemura | 1–6, 4–6 |
| Loss | 8. | 7 June 2009 | ITF Komoro, Japan | Clay | (Japan) Ayumi Oka | (China) Zhang Shuai (China) Xu Yifan | 2–6, 1–6 |
| Win | 10. | 13 June 2009 | ITF Bangkok, Thailand | Hard | (Thailand) Suchanun Viratprasert | (Japan) Tomoko Dokei (South Korea) Yoo Mi | 6–3, 6–1 |
| Win | 11. | 26 June 2009 | ITF Bangkok, Thailand | Hard | (Thailand) Suchanun Viratprasert | (Japan) Tomoko Dokei (South Korea) Yoo Mi | w/o |
| Win | 12. | 2 August 2009 | ITF Jakarta, Indonesia | Hard | (Thailand) Nungnadda Wannasuk | (India) Beatrice Gumulya (Indonesia) Jessy Rompies | 6–2, 6–7^{(5)}, [10–7] |
| Loss | 9. | 5 September 2009 | ITF Nonthaburi, Thailand | Hard | (Indonesia) Lavinia Tananta | (Uzbekistan) Albina Khabibulina (Thailand) Kanyapat Narattana | 7–5, 4–6, [8–10] |
| Win | 13. | 3 July 2010 | ITF Nonthaburi, Thailand | Hard | (Chinese Taipei) Chen Yi | (South Korea) Kim Kun-hee (South Korea) Yu Min-hwa | 6–2, 6–2 |
| Loss | 10. | 10 July 2010 | ITF Pattaya, Thailand | Hard | (Indonesia) Jessy Rompies | (Chinese Taipei) Chen Yi (Japan) Sakiko Shimizu | 3–6, 6–7^{(2)} |
| Loss | 11. | 9 October 2010 | ITF Nonthaburi, Thailand | Hard | (Chinese Taipei) Chen Yi | (Thailand) Peangtarn Plipuech (Thailand) Nungnadda Wannasuk | 5–7, 7–6^{(4)}, [9–11] |
| Win | 14. | 11 October 2010 | ITF Pattaya, Thailand | Hard | (Chinese Taipei) Chen Yi | (Chinese Taipei) Juan Ting-fei (China) Zhu Lin | 7–5, 6–2 |
| Win | 15. | 24 October 2010 | ITF Khon Kaen, Thailand | Hard | (Thailand) Luksika Kumkhum | (Vietnam) Huỳnh Phương Đài Trang (Japan) Maya Kato | 6–4, 7–5 |
| Win | 16. | 18 February 2011 | ITF Aurangabad, India | Hard | (Thailand) Varunya Wongteanchai | (Italy) Nicole Clerico (Italy) Maria Masini | 4–6, 6–2, [10–6] |
| Loss | 12. | 21 February 2011 | ITF Mumbai, India | Hard | (South Korea) Han Sung-hee | (Japan) Kanae Hisami (China) Li Ting | 1–6, 5–7 |
| Loss | 13. | 11 April 2011 | ITF Incheon, South Korea | Hard | (Chinese Taipei) Kao Shao-yuan | (South Korea) Han Sung-hee (South Korea) Hong Hyun-hui | 3–6, 6–7^{(3)} |
| Win | 17. | 28 May 2011 | ITF Bangkok, Thailand | Hard | (China) Li Ting | (Indonesia) Ayu-Fani Damayanti (Indonesia) Lavinia Tananta | 6–1, 6–4 |
| Win | 18. | 3 June 2011 | ITF Bangkok, Thailand | Hard | (China) Li Ting | (Indonesia) Ayu-Fani Damayanti (Indonesia) Lavinia Tananta | 5–7, 7–6^{(5)}, [10–5] |
| Win | 19. | 19 June 2011 | ITF Balikpapan, Indonesia | Hard | (Japan) Kanae Hisami | (Japan) Yurika Sema (Japan) Natsumi Hamamura | 6–3, 6–2 |
| Loss | 14. | 4 July 2011 | ITF Pattaya, Thailand | Hard | (Japan) Yurina Koshino | (China) Liang Chen (China) Zhao Yijing | 1–6, 4–6 |
| Win | 20. | 11 September 2011 | ITF Nato, Japan | Carpet | (Japan) Kanae Hisami | (Japan) Ayumi Oka (Japan) Natsumi Hamamura | 1–6, 7–6^{(4)}, [14–12] |
| Loss | 15. | 28 October 2011 | ITF Hamanako, Japan | Carpet | (Vietnam) Huỳnh Phương Đài Trang | (Japan) Natsumi Hamamura (Japan) Ayumi Oka | 3–6, 3–6 |
| Loss | 16. | 23 December 2011 | ITF Pune, India | Hard | (Thailand) Varunya Wongteanchai | (China) Lu Jiajing (China) Lu Jiaxiang | 1–6, 3–6 |
| Win | 21. | 22 July 2012 | ITF Astana, Kazakhstan | Hard | (Thailand) Luksika Kumkhum | (Ukraine) Veronika Kapshay (Russia) Ekaterina Yashina | 6–2, 6–4 |
| Win | 22. | 2 September 2012 | ITF Tsukuba, Japan | Hard | (Thailand) Luksika Kumkhum | (Japan) Yurina Koshino (Japan) Mari Tanaka | 6–2, 6–2 |
| Loss | 17. | 19 November 2012 | ITF Toyota, Japan | Carpet (i) | (Japan) Miki Miyamura | (Australia) Ashleigh Barty (Australia) Casey Dellacqua | 1–6, 2–6 |
| Win | 23. | 18 March 2013 | ITF Ipswich, Australia | Hard | (Thailand) Noppawan Lertcheewakarn | (Australia) Viktorija Rajicic (Australia) Storm Sanders | 4–6, 6–1, [10–8] |
| Loss | 18. | 25 March 2013 | ITF Bundaberg, Australia | Clay | (Japan) Miki Miyamura | (South Korea) Jang Su-jeong (South Korea) Lee So-ra | 6–7^{(4)}, 6–4, [8–10] |
| Win | 24. | 22 April 2013 | ITF Wenshan, China | Hard | (Japan) Miki Miyamura | (Japan) Rika Fujiwara (Japan) Junri Namigata | 7–5, 6–3 |
| Win | 25. | 10 February 2014 | ITF Nonthaburi, Thailand | Hard | (Hong Kong) Zhang Ling | (China) Tian Ran (China) Tang Haochen | 2–6, 6–2, [12–10] |
| Loss | 19. | 28 April 2014 | Anning Open, China | Clay | (Hong Kong) Zhang Ling | (China) Zhang Kailin (China) Han Xinyun | 4–6, 2–6 |
| Loss | 20. | 26 May 2014 | ITF Balikpapan, Indonesia | Hard | (Thailand) Varunya Wongteanchai | (Japan) Michika Ozeki (Thailand) Peangtarn Plipuech | 3–6, 6–4, [7–10] |
| Win | 26. | 2 June 2014 | ITF Tarakan, Indonesia | Hard (i) | (Thailand) Varunya Wongteanchai | (Indonesia) Beatrice Gumulya (Indonesia) Jessy Rompies | 5–7, 6–4, [11–9] |
| Win | 27. | 7 July 2014 | ITF Bangkok, Thailand | Hard | (Thailand) Varunya Wongteanchai | (Thailand) Luksika Kumkhum (Thailand) Tamarine Tanasugarn | 6–3, 4–6, [10–8] |
| Win | 28. | 13 October 2014 | ITF Bangkok, Thailand | Hard | (Thailand) Varunya Wongteanchai | (Czech Republic) Martina Borecká (Netherlands) Lesley Kerkhove | 6–2, 5–7, [10–7] |
| Win | 29. | 1 November 2014 | ITF Margaret River, Australia | Hard | (Japan) Miyabi Inoue | (Germany) Carolin Daniels (Germany) Laura Schäder | 4–6, 6–4, [10–3] |
| Loss | 21. | 14 November 2014 | Bendigo International, Australia | Hard | (Thailand) Varunya Wongteanchai | (Australia) Jessica Moore (Australia) Abbie Myers | 6–3, 1–6, [6–10] |
| Loss | 22. | 10 January 2015 | ITF Hong Kong | Hard | (Thailand) Varunya Wongteanchai | (China) Han Xinyun (Chinese Taipei) Hsu Chieh-yu | 6–3, 4–6, [8–10] |
| Win | 30. | 27 February 2015 | ITF Aurangabad, India | Clay | (Chinese Taipei) Lee Ya-hsuan | (Chinese Taipei) Hsu Ching-wen (Chinese Taipei) Lee Pei-chi | 6–1, 7–6^{(4)} |
| Loss | 23. | 20 September 2015 | ITF Redding, United States | Hard | (South Africa) Michelle Sammons | (United States) Ashley Weinhold (United States) Caitlin Whoriskey | 2–6, 5–7 |
| Loss | 24. | 24 October 2015 | ITF Brisbane, Australia | Hard | (Thailand) Noppawan Lertcheewakarn | (United States) Lauren Embree (United States) Asia Muhammad | 2–6, 6–4, [9–11] |
| Loss | 25. | 20 March 2016 | ITF Canberra, Australia | Clay | (Japan) Kanae Hisami | (Australia) Ashleigh Barty (Australia) Arina Rodionova | 4–6, 2–6 |
| Win | 31. | 24 April 2016 | ITF Nanning, China | Hard | (China) Liu Chang | (Russia) Ksenia Lykina (United Kingdom) Emily Webley-Smith | 6–1, 6–4 |
| Loss | 26. | 2 May 2016 | Kunming Open, China | Clay | (China) Yang Zhaoxuan | (China) Wang Yafan (China) Zhang Kailin | 7–6^{(3)}, 6–7^{(2)}, [1–10] |
| Loss | 27. | 4 February 2017 | Burnie International, Australia | Hard | (Australia) Alison Bai | (Japan) Riko Sawayanagi (Czech Republic) Barbora Štefková | 6–7^{(6)}, 6–4, [7–10] |
| Loss | 28. | 25 March 2017 | ITF Mornington, Australia | Clay | (Australia) Jessica Moore | (Australia) Priscilla Hon (Hungary) Fanny Stollár | 1–6, 5–7 |
| Loss | 29. | 31 March 2017 | ITF Mornington, Australia | Clay | (Australia) Jessica Moore | (Israel) Julia Glushko (Czech Republic) Barbora Krejčíková | 4–6, 6–2, [9–11] |
| Loss | 30. | 18 August 2017 | ITF Nonthaburi, India | Hard | (Thailand) Varunya Wongteanchai | (Chinese Taipei) Chan Chin-wei (South Korea) Choi Ji-hee | 6–2, 1–6, [11–13] |
