= Sonchat Ratiwatana =

Thai tennis player (born 1982)

Sonchat Ratiwatana สนฉัตร รติวัฒน์
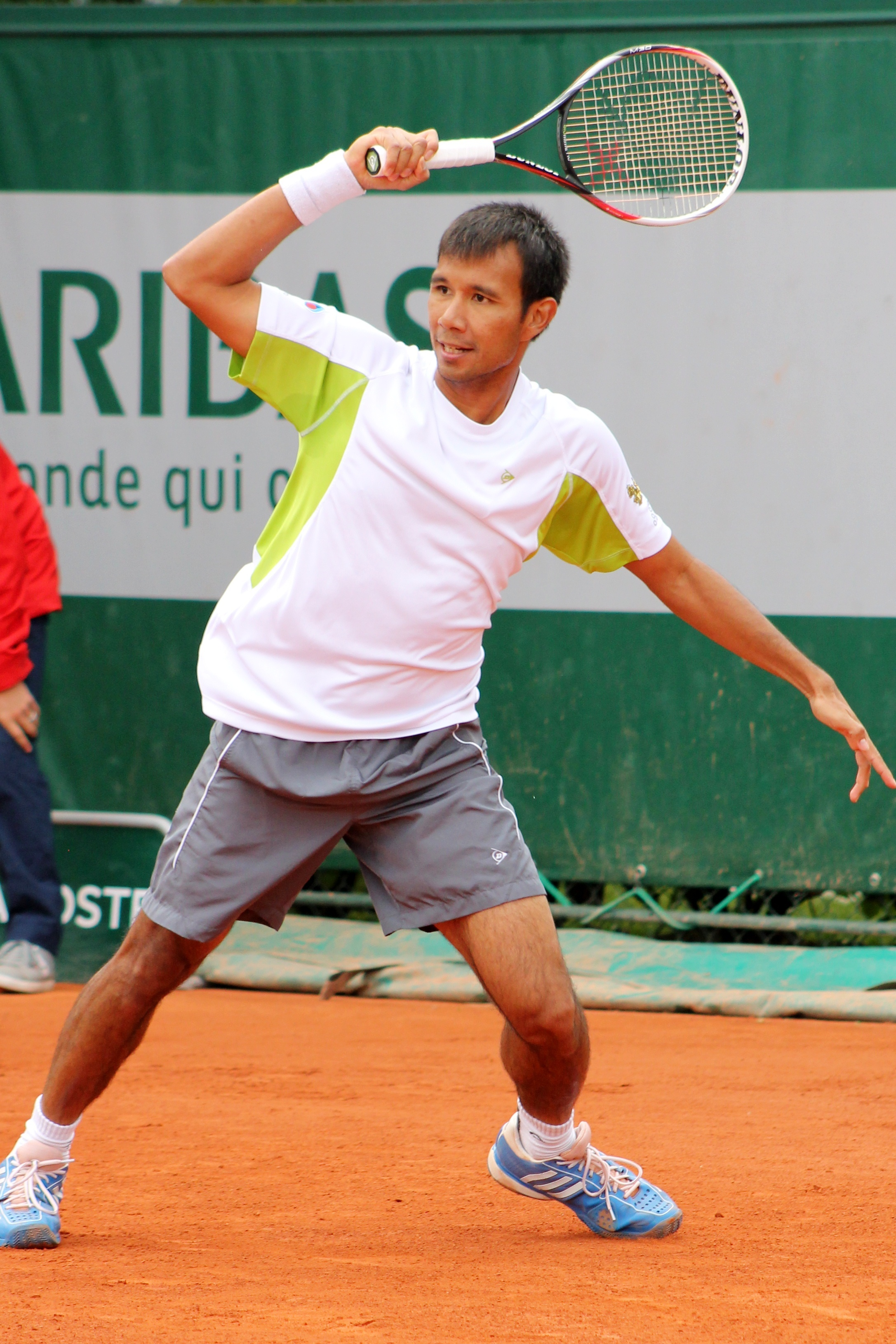
- Sonchat Ratiwatana at Roland Garros 2013
- Country (sports): Thailand
- Residence: Bangkok, Thailand
- Born: January 23, 1982 (age 44) Bangkok, Thailand
- Height: 1.75 m (5 ft 9 in)
- Turned pro: 2004
- Retired: 2020
- Plays: Right-handed (one-handed backhand)
- Prize money: US $507,875

Singles
- Career record: 2–5
- Career titles: 0
- Highest ranking: No. 655 (3 May 2004)

Doubles
- Career record: 61–80
- Career titles: 2
- Highest ranking: No. 39 (28 April 2008)

Grand Slam doubles results
- Australian Open: 1R (2008, 2011, 2013, 2018)
- French Open: 1R (2008, 2013)
- Wimbledon: 3R (2010)
- US Open: 1R (2008, 2012)

Other doubles tournaments
- Olympic Games: 1R (2016)

Grand Slam mixed doubles results
- Wimbledon: 1R (2008)
Medal record
Men's Tennis
Representing Thailand
Universiade
| Gold medal – first place | 2007 Bangkok | Doubles |
| Bronze medal – third place | 2003 Daegu | Doubles |
Asian Games
| Silver medal – second place | 2006 Doha | Doubles |
| Silver medal – second place | 2018 Jakarta–Palembang | Mixed doubles |
| Bronze medal – third place | 2006 Doha | Team |
| Bronze medal – third place | 2014 Incheon | Doubles |
Southeast Asian Games
| Gold medal – first place | 2003 Vietnam | Doubles |
| Gold medal – first place | 2005 Manila | Doubles |
| Gold medal – first place | 2007 Nakhon Ratchasima | Doubles |
| Gold medal – first place | 2007 Nakhon Ratchasima | Team |
| Gold medal – first place | 2009 Vientiane | Doubles |
| Gold medal – first place | 2009 Vientiane | Mixed doubles |
| Gold medal – first place | 2015 Singapore | Doubles |
| Gold medal – first place | 2015 Singapore | Team |
| Gold medal – first place | 2017 Kuala Lumpur | Doubles |
| Silver medal – second place | 2003 Vietnam | Team |
| Silver medal – second place | 2009 Vientiane | Team |
| Silver medal – second place | 2015 Singapore | Mixed doubles |
| Bronze medal – third place | 2003 Vietnam | Mixed doubles |
| Bronze medal – third place | 2005 Manila | Mixed doubles |
| Bronze medal – third place | 2005 Manila | Team |
| Bronze medal – third place | 2007 Nakhon Ratchasima | Mixed doubles |
| Bronze medal – third place | 2011 Jakarta-Palembang | Team |
| Bronze medal – third place | 2017 Kuala Lumpur | Mixed doubles |
| Bronze medal – third place | 2019 Philippines | Mixed doubles |

Sonchat Ratiwatana (Thai: สนฉัตร รติวัฒน์, pronounced [sǒn.t͡ɕʰàt rá(ʔ).tī.wát]), nicknamed Ton (ต้น, [tôn]; born January 23, 1982, in Bangkok) is a former professional tennis player from Thailand. In 2007, Sonchat and his twin brother Sanchai Ratiwatana won their first ATP doubles title in Bangkok in their home country. In the final, the team beat 2007 Wimbledon men's doubles winner Michaël Llodra and 2007 U.S. Open men's doubles semifinalist Nicolas Mahut. He reached his highest doubles ranking at world number 39 as of 28 April 2008. He plays right-handed and turned professional in 2004. He and his twin brother played in their first grand slam tournament during the Australian Open in 2008, where they lost to the eventual finalist pairing of Arnaud Clément & Michaël Llodra of France in the first round.

== ATP career finals ==
=== Doubles: 3 (2 titles, 1 runner-up) ===
| Legend Grand Slam tournaments (0–0) ATP World Tour Finals (0–0) ATP World Tour Masters 1000 (0–0) ATP World Tour 500 Series (0–1) ATP World Tour 250 Series (2–0) | Titles by surface Hard (2–1) Clay (0–0) Grass (0–0) | Titles by setting Outdoor (1–0) Indoor (1–1) |

| Result | W–L | Date | Tournament | Tier | Surface | Partner | Opponents | Score |
|---|---|---|---|---|---|---|---|---|
| Win | 1–0 | Sep 2007 | Thailand Open, Thailand | International | Hard (i) | (Thailand) Sanchai Ratiwatana | (France) Michaël Llodra (France) Nicolas Mahut | 3–6, 7–5, [10–7] |
| Win | 2–0 | Jan 2008 | Chennai Open, India | International | Hard | (Thailand) Sanchai Ratiwatana | (Cyprus) Marcos Baghdatis (France) Marc Gicquel | 6–4, 7–5 |
| Loss | 2–1 | Feb 2008 | U.S. National Indoor Tennis Championships, US | Intl. Gold | Hard (i) | (Thailand) Sanchai Ratiwatana | (India) Mahesh Bhupathi (The Bahamas) Mark Knowles | 6–7^{(5–7)}, 2–6 |

== Grand Slam doubles timeline ==
Key
| W | F | SF | QF | #R | RR | Q# | DNQ | A | NH |

(W) winner; (F) finalist; (SF) semifinalist; (QF) quarterfinalist; (#R) rounds 4, 3, 2, 1; (RR) round-robin stage; (Q#) qualification round; (DNQ) did not qualify; (A) absent; (NH) not held; (SR) strike rate (events won / competed); (W–L) win–loss record.
To avoid confusion and double counting, these charts are updated at the conclusion of a tournament or when the player's participation has ended.

| Tournament | 2006 | 2007 | 2008 | 2009 | 2010 | 2011 | 2012 | 2013 | 2014 | W–L |
|---|---|---|---|---|---|---|---|---|---|---|
| Australian Open | A | A | 1R | A | A | 1R | A | 1R | | 0–3 |
| French Open | A | A | 1R | A | A | A | A | 1R | | 0–2 |
| Wimbledon | 2R | 1R | 1R | 2R | 3R | 1R | 2R | 2R | | 6–8 |
| US Open | A | A | 1R | A | A | A | 1R | A | | 0–2 |
| Win–loss | 1–1 | 0–1 | 0–4 | 1–1 | 2–1 | 0–2 | 1–2 | 1–3 | | 6–15 |
