= Nesa Arta =

Indonesian tennis player

- Full name: Ketut-Nesa Arta
- Country (sports): Indonesia
- Born: 16 February 1982 (age 44) Jakarta, Indonesia
- Plays: Right-handed

Singles
- Highest ranking: No. 1242 (30 Aug 2004)

Doubles
- Highest ranking: No. 886 (2 Aug 2010)
Medal record
Men's Tennis
Representing Indonesia
Southeast Asian Games
Bronze medal – third place	2009 Vientiane	Doubles
Bronze medal – third place	2009 Vientiane	Team

Ketut-Nesa Arta (born 16 February 1982), known as Nesa Arta, is an Indonesian former professional tennis player.

Arta, a native of Jakarta, competed at satellite/Futures level in tournaments around Asia and was a Davis Cup doubles player for Indonesia from 2008 to 2010. Partnering him in all five Davis Cup rubbers was Christopher Rungkat and the pair registered three wins. He and Rungkat also teamed up together to claim a doubles bronze medal at the 2009 Southeast Asian Games held in Laos.

== ITF Futures titles ==
=== Doubles: (2) ===
No.	Date	Tournament	Surface	Partner	Opponents	Score
1.	Aug 2004	Indonesia F3, Semarang	Hard	(Indonesia) Eko Kurniawan	(Indonesia) Hendri Susilo Pramono (Indonesia) Febi Widhiyanto	6–4, 7–6^{(4)}
2.	Aug 2009	Thailand F2, Nonthaburi	Hard	(Indonesia) Christopher Rungkat	(Japan) Tasuku Iwami (Japan) Hiroki Moriya	4–6, 6–4, [12–10]

== See also ==
- List of Indonesia Davis Cup team representatives
