= Patrick John Tierro =

American-born Filipino tennis player

- Country (sports): Philippines
- Born: August 1, 1985 (age 41) Charleston, South Carolina, United States
- Plays: Right-handed

Singles
- Career record: 9–9 (Davis Cup)
- Highest ranking: No. 777 (March 5, 2007)

Doubles
- Career record: 4–1 (Davis Cup)
- Highest ranking: No. 1321 (March 6, 2006)
Medal record
Men's Tennis
Representing Philippines
Southeast Asian Games
| Gold medal – first place | 2005 Manila | Team |
| Gold medal – first place | 2009 Vientiane | Team |
| Bronze medal – third place | 2007 Nakhon Ratchasima | Team |

Patrick John "PJ" Tierro (born August 1, 1985) is an American-born Filipino former professional tennis player.

Tierro, who was born in South Carolina, began his Davis Cup career in 2004 and featured in a total of 19 ties, across two stints in the team. In 2009 he stepped away from the side while he undertook his studies at De La Salle University but returned after graduating and played until 2017. He won nine singles and four doubles rubbers for his country.

A two-time Asian Games representative, Tierro was a Southeast Asian Games gold medalist for the Philippines in both 2005 and 2009, as a competitor in the team event.
