= Danai Udomchoke =

Thai tennis player

Danai Udomchoke ดนัย อุดมโชค
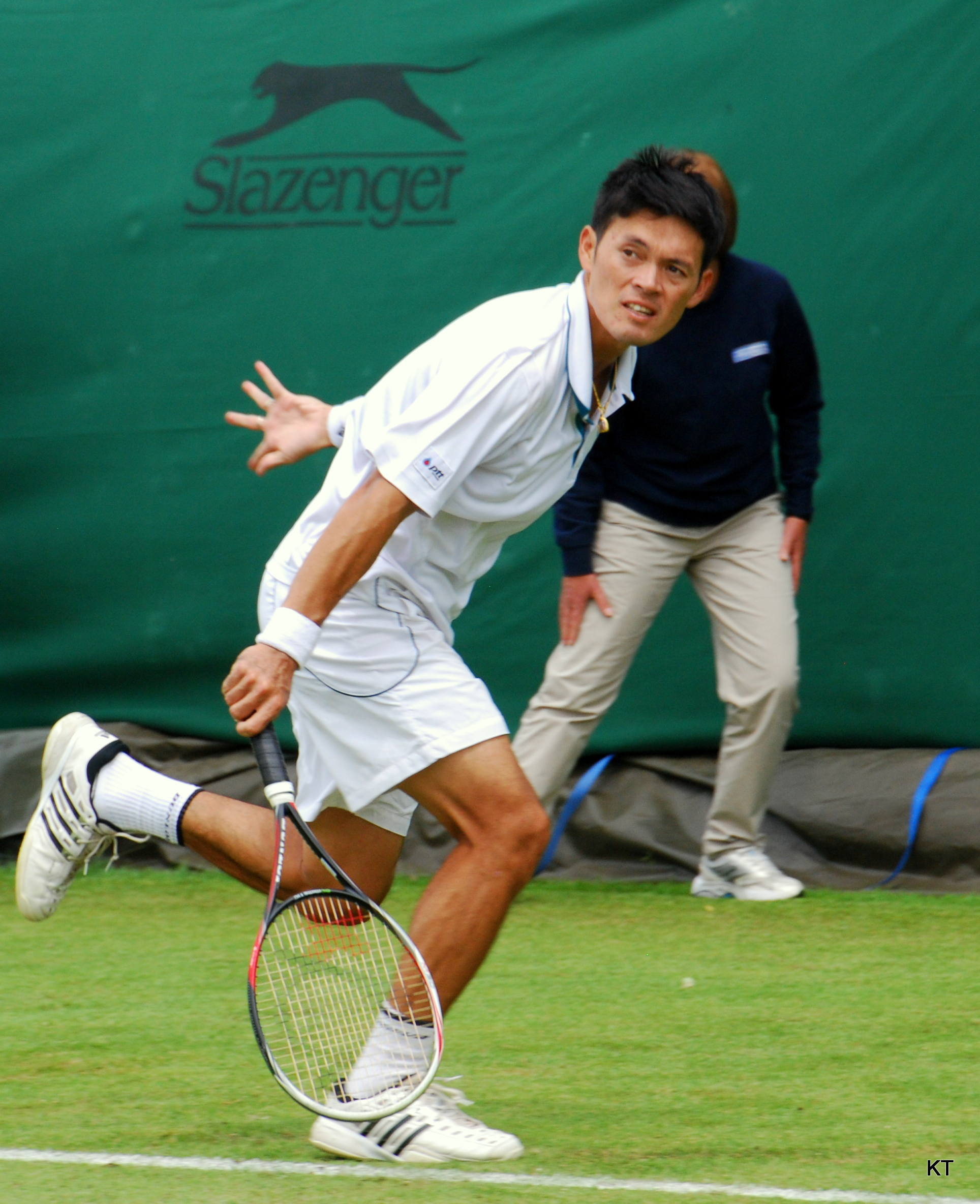
- Danai Udomchoke (2013)
- Country (sports): Thailand
- Residence: Bangkok, Thailand
- Born: 11 August 1981 (age 44) Bangkok, Thailand
- Height: 1.72 m (5 ft 7 1/2 in)
- Turned pro: 1997
- Retired: 2015
- Plays: Right-handed (one-handed backhand)
- Coach: Jan Stoce
- Prize money: US$ 1,095,170

Singles
- Career record: 55–69
- Career titles: 0
- Highest ranking: No. 77 (29 January 2007)

Grand Slam singles results
- Australian Open: 3R (2007)
- French Open: 1R (2007)
- Wimbledon: 2R (2005, 2007)
- US Open: 1R (2004)

Doubles
- Career record: 12–27
- Career titles: 1
- Highest ranking: No. 130 (8 October 2012)

Grand Slam doubles results
- Australian Open: 1R (2007, 2013)
Medal record
Men's Tennis
Representing Thailand
Asian Games
Gold medal – first place	2006 Doha	Singles
Bronze medal – third place	2006 Doha	Team
Southeast Asian Games
Gold medal – first place	1999 Bandar Seri Begawan	Team
Gold medal – first place	2001 Kuala Lumpur	Singles
Gold medal – first place	2001 Kuala Lumpur	Doubles
Gold medal – first place	2003 Vietnam	Singles
Gold medal – first place	2007 Nakhon Ratchasima	Team
Gold medal – first place	2015 Singapore	Team
Silver medal – second place	1999 Bandar Seri Begawan	Doubles
Silver medal – second place	2001 Kuala Lumpur	Team
Silver medal – second place	2003 Vietnam	Team
Silver medal – second place	2005 Manila	Singles
Silver medal – second place	2007 Nakhon Ratchasima	Singles
Silver medal – second place	2009 Vientiane	Team
Silver medal – second place	2011 Jakarta-Palembang	Singles
Bronze medal – third place	1999 Bandar Seri Begawan	Singles
Bronze medal – third place	2005 Manila	Team
Bronze medal – third place	2009 Vientiane	Singles
Bronze medal – third place	2009 Vientiane	Doubles
Bronze medal – third place	2011 Jakarta-Palembang	Doubles
Bronze medal – third place	2011 Jakarta-Palembang	Team
Universiade
Gold medal – first place	2007 Bangkok	Singles
- Last updated on: 15 February 2016.

Danai Udomchoke (Thai: ดนัย อุดมโชค, born 11 August 1981) is a former professional tennis player from Thailand. His career-best ranking was World No. 77 achieved on 29 January 2007.

== Personal info ==
Udomchoke turned professional in 1997. He was sponsored by Dunlop Sport for his racquets and apparel.

== Career ==
Udomchoke made his debut in the main draw of a Grand Slam in 2004 when he qualified for the US Open. He lost to Spaniard Tommy Robredo in straight sets. One of Udomchoke's highest profile matches was his 2006 Australian Open 1st round match against No. 3 seed David Nalbandian. After starting out slowly, Udomchoke shocked Nalbandian by winning the third and fourth sets. However, his energy soon wore down, and despite pushing the World No. 3 to five sets, Udomchoke lost 2–6, 2–6, 6–1, 7–6, 1–6. In the 2007 Australian Open, Udomchoke advanced to the third round, losing to 14th-seeded Novak Djokovic after defeating 24th-seeded Juan Carlos Ferrero. Udomchoke qualified for Wimbledon in 2007 and was defeated in the second round by Andy Roddick.

== ATP career finals ==
=== Doubles: 1 (1–0) ===
Legend (doubles)
Grand Slam Tournaments (0–0)
ATP World Tour Finals (0–0)
ATP World Tour Masters 1000 (0–0)
ATP World Tour 500 Series (0–0)
ATP World Tour 250 Series (1–0)

Result.	W–L	Date	Tournament	Surface	Partner	Opponents	Score
Winner	1–0	30 September 2012	PTT Thailand Open, Bangkok, Thailand	Hard (i)	(Chinese Taipei) Lu Yen-hsun	(United States) Eric Butorac (Australia) Paul Hanley	6–3, 6–4

== Asian Games ==
In the 15th Asian Games held in Doha, Qatar, he won the gold medal for Thailand, after beating Korean Lee Hyung-taik in two sets, 7–5 and 6–3, in the men's singles tournament.

== Singles titles (9) ==
Legend (singles)
Grand Slam (0)
Tennis Masters Cup (0)
ATP Masters Series (0)
ATP Tour (0)
Challengers (9)

No.	Date	Tournament	Surface	Opponent	Score
1.	6 October 2003	Dharwad	Hard	(Chinese Taipei) Yeu-Tzuoo Wang	7–6, 6–1
2.	23 May 2005	Busan	Hard	(United States) Paul Goldstein	7–6, 6–1
3.	25 July 2005	Granby	Hard	(France) Gregory Carraz	7–6, 2–6, 7–6
4.	14 November 2005	Champaign	Hard (i)	(United States) Justin Gimelstob	7–5, 6–2
5.	17 April 2006	Chikmagalur	Hard	(Japan) Toshihide Matsui	7–6, 6–4
6.	15 May 2006	Fergana	Hard	(Austria) Alexander Peya	6–0, 6–2
7.	6 November 2006	Busan	Hard	(United States) Paul Goldstein	6–2, 6–0
8.	17 May 2009	Busan	Hard	(Slovenia) Blaž Kavčič	6–2, 6–2
9.	4 February 2012	Burnie	Hard	(Australia) Samuel Groth	7–6^{(7–5)}, 6–3

== Singles performance timeline ==
Key
W	F	SF	QF	#R	RR	Q#	DNQ	A	NH

(W) winner; (F) finalist; (SF) semifinalist; (QF) quarterfinalist; (#R) rounds 4, 3, 2, 1; (RR) round-robin stage; (Q#) qualification round; (DNQ) did not qualify; (A) absent; (NH) not held; (SR) strike rate (events won / competed); (W–L) win–loss record.

Current until 2014 Australian Open.

Tournament	2000	2001	2002	2003	2004	2005	2006	2007	2008	2009	2010	2011	2012	2013	W–L
Grand Slam tournaments
Australian Open	Q2	Q1	Q1	Q1	Q2	Q1	1R	3R	Q3	Q3	Q1	Q3	1R	Q2	2–3
French Open	A	A	Q1	Q1	Q1	A	A	1R	A	A	A	A	Q1	Q1	0–1
Wimbledon	A	A	A	Q1	Q3	2R	1R	2R	Q1	1R	A	Q2	Q1	Q2	2–4
US Open	Q2	Q1	Q3	Q2	1R	Q3	Q1	1R	A	A	A	Q1	Q1	A	0–2
Win–loss	0–0	0–0	0–0	0–0	0–1	1–1	0–2	3–4	0–0	0–1	0–0	0–0	0–1	0–0	4–10
