= Dianne Matias =

Filipino-American tennis player

- Full name: Dianne Kenneth Matias
- Country (sports): Philippines; United States
- Born: February 2, 1985 (age 41) Balagtas, Bulacan, Philippines
- Plays: Right-handed
- Prize money: $6,922

Singles
- Career record: 15–30
- Career titles: 0
- Highest ranking: No. 670 (October 21, 2002)

Doubles
- Career record: 11–19
- Career titles: 1 ITF
- Highest ranking: No. 742 (July 7, 2003)
Medal record
Representing Philippines
Southeast Asian Games
Bronze medal – third place	2007 Nakhon Ratchasima	Mixed doubles
Bronze medal – third place	2007 Nakhon Ratchasima	Women's doubles
Bronze medal – third place	2007 Nakhon Ratchasima	Women's team

Dianne Kenneth Matias (born 2 February 1985) is a Filipino-American former professional tennis player.

Born in Balagtas, Philippines, Matias was six years of age when her family emigrated to the United States and she grew up in the South Bay region of Los Angeles County. She played collegiate tennis for the University of Southern California between 2003 and 2007, earning a best national ranking of 32. Her two younger brothers, Ace and Ivan, also competed at collegiate level.

Matias reached a best singles world ranking of 670 on the professional tour. In 2006, she featured in the qualifying draw for the Indian Wells Open (WTA Tour event) and was eliminated by Victoria Azarenka. She won three bronze medals for the Philippines at the 2007 Southeast Asian Games. In 2008, she represented the Philippines Fed Cup team in three ties, against Syria, South Korea and Singapore. Undefeated, she won her only singles match and both of her doubles rubbers.

From 2013 to 2021, Matias served as the head women's coach for Cal State Fullerton.

== ITF finals ==
=== Singles (0–1) ===
Result	Date	Location	Surface	Opponent	Score
Loss	Nov 2001	Manila, Philippines	Hard	(Chinese Taipei) Chuang Chia-jung	2–6, 1–6

=== Doubles (1–0) ===
Result	Date	Location	Surface	Partner	Opponents	Score
Win	Nov 2002	Manila, Philippines	Hard	(Netherlands) Kim Kilsdonk	(China) Dong Yanhua (China) Zhang Yao	4–6, 6–4, 6–4
