= Lê Quốc Khánh =

Vietnamese tennis player

Lê Quốc Khanh
- Country (sports): Vietnam
- Born: 2 September 1982 (age 43) Ho Chi Minh City, Vietnam
- Plays: Right-handed
- Prize money: $6,245

Singles
- Career record: 4–8 (at ATP Tour level, Grand Slam level, and in Davis Cup)
- Career titles: 0
- Highest ranking: No. 1317 (23 August 2004)

Doubles
- Career record: 24–20 (at ATP Tour level, Grand Slam level, and in Davis Cup)
- Career titles: 0
- Highest ranking: No. 959 (10 July 2006)
Medal record
Men's Tennis
Representing Vietnam
Southeast Asian Games
Bronze medal – third place	2003 Vietnam	Doubles
Bronze medal – third place	2003 Vietnam	Team
Bronze medal – third place	2005 Manila	Team
Bronze medal – third place	2007 Nakhon Ratchasima	Doubles
Bronze medal – third place	2007 Nakhon Ratchasima	Team
Bronze medal – third place	2009 Vientiane	Team
Bronze medal – third place	2019 Philippines	Doubles
Bronze medal – third place	2021 Vietnam	Doubles
- Last updated on: 7 April 2018.

Lê Quốc Khánh (born 2 September 1982) is a Vietnamese tennis player.

Lê has a career high ATP singles ranking of 1317 achieved on 23 August 2004. He also has a career high ATP doubles ranking of 959 achieved on 10 July 2006.

Lê represents Vietnam at the Davis Cup, where he has a W/L record of 28–28.
