= Nudnida Luangnam =

Thai tennis player

- Native name: ณัฐนิดา หลวงแนม
- Country (sports): Thailand
- Residence: Bangkok, Thailand
- Born: 27 February 1987 (age 39) Sukhothai province, Thailand
- Height: 1.67 m (5 ft 6 in)
- Retired: February 2020 (last match)
- Plays: Right-handed (two-handed backhand)
- Prize money: $217,096

Singles
- Career record: 433–324
- Career titles: 13 ITF
- Highest ranking: No. 195 (13 May 2013)

Grand Slam singles results
- Australian Open: Q1 (2011, 2013)
- French Open: Q1 (2013)
- Wimbledon: Q1 (2013)
- US Open: Q1 (2013)

Doubles
- Career record: 157–138
- Career titles: 13 ITF
- Highest ranking: No. 342 (13 November 2017)

Team competitions
- Fed Cup: 5–11

Nudnida "Chun" Luangnam (Thai: ณัฐนิดา หลวงแนม; born 27 February 1987) is a former tennis player from Thailand. She has career-high WTA rankings of 195 in singles, set on 13 May 2013, and 342 in doubles, achieved on 13 November 2017.

== Career overview ==
She took part in the 2007 Bangalore Open but lost in the first round.

In 2013, Luangnam qualified for the Auckland Open defeating players like Irina Falconi, Irena Pavlovic and Gréta Arn, before losing to Romina Oprandi. She then played the qualifying event of the Australian Open but lost in the first round to Estrella Cabeza Candela. Luangnam had some WTA Tour success when she qualified for the Malaysian Open defeating Chan Chin-wei and Monique Adamczak and then reached the second round, beating Zheng Saisai in the first, before falling to Ayumi Morita. She then played qualifying for the French Open but lost to Aleksandra Krunić in the first round.

In her career, she won 13 titles in singles and 13 in doubles on tournaments of the ITF Women's Circuit.

== ITF Circuit finals ==
=== Singles: 26 (13 titles, 13 runner-ups) ===
Legend $50,000 tournaments $25,000 tournaments $10/15,000 tournaments	Finals by surface Hard (11–11) Clay (2–0) Carpet (0–2)

Result	W–L	Date	Tournament	Tier	Surface	Opponent	Score
Loss	0–1	May 2005	ITF Jakarta, Indonesia	10,000	Hard	(Indonesia) Ayu Fani Damayanti	4–6, 0–6
Win	1–1	Sep 2005	ITF Jakarta, Indonesia	10,000	Hard	(Chinese Taipei) Chen Lu-ling	6–4, 6–4
Win	2–1	Apr 2006	ITF Chennai, India	10,000	Clay	(Japan) Miki Miyamura	6–3, 6–0
Win	3–1	May 2007	ITF Vic, Spain	10,000	Clay	(Italy) Lisa Tognetti	4–6, 6–3, 6–3
Loss	3–2	May 2009	ITF Tanjung Selor, Indonesia	25,000	Hard	(Slovenia) Tadeja Majerič	3–6, 5–7
Loss	3–3	Jul 2010	ITF Pattaya, Thailand	10,000	Hard	(Japan) Shiho Akita	3–6, 4–6
Loss	3–4	Jul 2010	ITF Hatyai, Thailand	10,000	Hard	(Indonesia) Lavinia Tananta	4–6, 6–3, 0–6
Win	4–4	Jul 2010	ITF Nonthaburi, Thailand	25,000	Hard	(Japan) Tomoko Yonemura	2–6, 7–5, 6–1
Win	5–4	Aug 2010	ITF Balikpapan, Indonesia	25,000	Hard	(Belgium) An-Sophie Mestach	6–0, 3–6, 6–2
Loss	5–5	Sep 2010	ITF Noto, Japan	25,000	Carpet	(Thailand) Tamarine Tanasugarn	5–7, 2–6
Loss	5–6	Sep 2010	ITF Kyoto, Japan	10,000	Carpet	(Japan) Makiho Kozawa	5–7, 2–6
Loss	5–7	May 2012	ITF Tarakan, Indonesia	25,000	Hard	(China) Lu Jiajing	2–6, 6–0, 2–6
Loss	5–8	July 2012	ITF Astana, Kazakhstan	25,000	Hard	(Thailand) Luksika Kumkhum	6–3, 3–6, 3–6
Win	6–8	Feb 2014	ITF Nonthaburi, Thailand	10,000	Hard	(China) Wen Xin	6–3, 6–4
Loss	6–9	Mar 2014	ITF Nishitama, Japan	10,000	Hard	(Japan) Miyabi Inoue	6–1, 5–7, 1–6
Win	7–9	Sep 2014	ITF Kyoto, Japan	10,000	Hard (i)	(Japan) Kyōka Okamura	7–6^{(9–7)}, 3–6, 6–4
Win	8–9	Feb 2015	ITF Sharm El Sheikh, Egypt	10,000	Hard	(Russia) Aminat Kushkhova	6–1, 6–3
Win	9–9	Mar 2015	ITF Sharm El Sheikh, Egypt	10,000	Hard	(Austria) Melanie Klaffner	6–2, 6–4
Loss	9–10	Nov 2016	ITF Hua Hin, Thailand	10,000	Hard	(Russia) Natela Dzalamidze	1–6, 3–6
Loss	9–11	Dec 2016	ITF Hong Kong	10,000	Hard	(Russia) Olga Doroshina	6–2, 4–6, 2–6
Loss	9–12	May 2018	ITF Hua Hin, Thailand	15,000	Hard	(Thailand) Bunyawi Thamchaiwat	1–6, 1–6
Loss	9–13	Sep 2018	ITF Nonthaburi, Thailand	15,000	Hard	(Chinese Taipei) Lee Hua-chen	2–6, 2–6
Win	10–13	Nov 2018	ITF Nonthaburi, Thailand	15,000	Hard	(Japan) Misaki Matsuda	7–6^{(7–3)}, 2–6, 6–2
Win	11–13	Dec 2018	ITF Hua Hin, Thailand	15,000	Hard	(Indonesia) Aldila Sutjiadi	6–1, 3–6, 6–3
Win	12–13	Dec 2018	ITF Hua Hin, Thailand	15,000	Hard	(Indonesia) Aldila Sutjiadi	6–3, 1–6, 6–1
Win	13–13	May 2019	ITF Singapore	25,000	Hard	(Indonesia) Aldila Sutjiadi	6–3, 6–2

=== Doubles (13–7) ===
Legend $25,000 tournaments $15,000 tournaments $10,000 tournaments	Finals by surface Hard (12–6) Clay (1–1)

Outcome	No.	Date	Tournament	Surface	Partner	Opponents	Score
Winner	1.	13 November 2004	ITF Manila, Philippines	Clay	(Thailand) Prim Buaklee	(Indonesia) Ayu Fani Damayanti (Indonesia) Septi Mende	w/o
Runner-up	1.	4 December 2004	ITF Bangkok, Thailand	Hard	(Chinese Taipei) Hwang I-hsuan	(Uzbekistan) Akgul Amanmuradova (Thailand) Napaporn Tongsalee	4–6, 4–6
Winner	2.	1 April 2006	ITF Mumbai, India	Hard	(Thailand) Thassha Vitayaviroj	(United Kingdom) Natasha Khan (United Kingdom) Claire Peterzan	3–3 ret.
Runner-up	2.	8 April 2006	ITF Chennai, India	Clay	(Thailand) Thassha Vitayaviroj	(South Korea) Cho Jeong-a (South Korea) Kim Ji-young	4–6, 4–6
Winner	3.	30 July 2006	ITF Bangkok, Thailand	Hard	(Indonesia) Ayu Fani Damayanti	(Thailand) Wilawan Choptang (Thailand) Thassha Vitayaviroj	6–2, 6–2
Runner-up	3.	31 May 2015	ITF Balikpapan, Indonesia	Hard	(Thailand) Nicha Lertpitaksinchai	(United Kingdom) Harriet Dart (India) Prarthana Thombare	4–6, 6–4, [16–18]
Winner	4.	25 October 2015	ITF Bangkok, Thailand	Hard	(Thailand) Peangtarn Plipuech	(Finland) Emma Laine (Ukraine) Valeriya Strakhova	6–2, 6–3
Winner	5.	15 October 2016	ITF Hua Hin, Thailand	Hard	(China) Zhang Yukun	(China) Guo Hanyu (China) Lu Jiaxi	6–2, 6–3
Winner	6.	22 October 2016	ITF Hua Hin, Thailand	Hard	(Thailand) Varunya Wongteanchai	(Thailand) Chompoothip Jandakate (Thailand) Tamachan Momkoonthod	6–2, 6–7^{(2–7)}, [10–0]
Winner	7.	4 December 2016	ITF Hua Hin, Thailand	Hard	(Thailand) Varunya Wongteanchai	(Japan) Mai Hontama (Japan) Yukina Saigo	7–5, 6–3
Runner-up	4.	17 February 2017	ITF Nanjing, China	Hard	(China) Ye Qiuyu	(China) Guo Shanshan (China) Jiang Xinyu	5–7, 5–7
Winner	8.	30 April 2017	ITF Hua Hin, Thailand	Hard	(Thailand) Varunya Wongteanchai	(Thailand) Patcharin Cheapchandej (South Korea) Han Sung-hee	7–5, 6–2
Runner-up	5.	12 May 2017	ITF Hua Hin, Thailand	Hard	(China) Zhang Yukun	(India) Ankita Raina (United Kingdom) Emily Webley-Smith	2–6, 0–6
Runner-up	6.	10 July 2017	ITF Hua Hin, Thailand	Hard	(Thailand) Varunya Wongteanchai	(Indonesia) Beatrice Gumulya (Indonesia) Jessy Rompies	2–6, 1–6
Winner	9.	17 July 2017	ITF Hua Hin, Thailand	Hard	(Thailand) Varunya Wongteanchai	(Thailand) Patcharin Cheapchandej (South Korea) Han Sung-hee	6–2, 7–6^{(7–5)}
Winner	10.	7 October 2017	ITF Nonthaburi, Thailand	Hard	(Thailand) Varunya Wongteanchai	(Malta) Elaine Genovese (Finland) Oona Orpana	6–4, 6–4
Runner-up	7.	13 October 2017	ITF Nonthaburi, Thailand	Hard	(Thailand) Varunya Wongteanchai	(Chinese Taipei) Chan Chin-wei (Chinese Taipei) Liang En-shuo	1–6, 4–6
Winner	11.	7 November 2018	ITF Nonthaburi, Thailand	Hard	(Thailand) Bunyawi Thamchaiwat	(Chinese Taipei) Cho I-hsuan (China) Wang Danni	6–2, 6–0
Winner	12.	16 November 2018	ITF Nonthaburi, Thailand	Hard	(Thailand) Varunya Wongteanchai	(Japan) Ramu Ueda (Thailand) Bunyawi Thamchaiwat	2–6, 6–4, [10–7]
Winner	13.	30 November 2018	ITF Hua Hin, Thailand	Hard	(Thailand) Bunyawi Thamchaiwat	(Japan) Ayaka Okuno (Indonesia) Aldila Sutjiadi	6–4, 6–2
