= Suchanun Viratprasert =

Thai tennis player (born 1983)

Suchanun Viratprasert สุชานัน วิรัชประเสริฐ
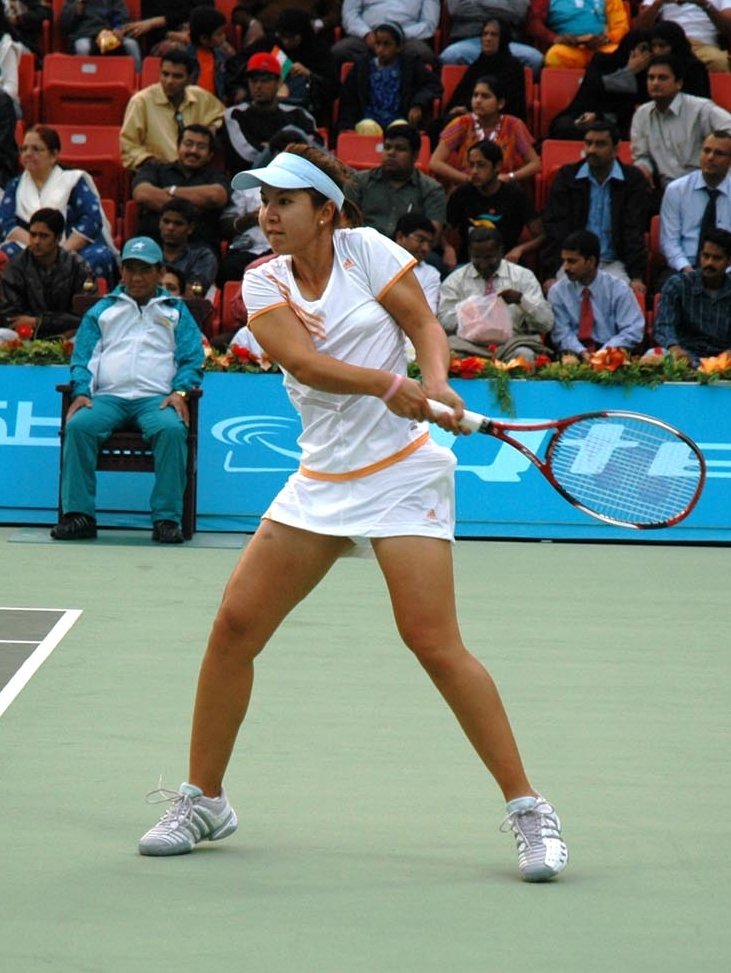
- Country (sports): Thailand
- Residence: Bangkok, Thailand
- Born: 1 January 1983 (age 43) Bangkok
- Height: 168 cm (5 ft 6 in)
- Turned pro: 1997
- Retired: 2013
- Plays: Right (two-handed backhand)
- Prize money: $144,002

Singles
- Career record: 251–191
- Career titles: 9 ITF
- Highest ranking: No. 172 (9 August 2004)

Doubles
- Career record: 53–56
- Career titles: 6 ITF
- Highest ranking: No. 357 (9 February 2004)

Team competitions
- Fed Cup: 19–15

Suchanun Viratprasert (Thai: สุชานัน วิรัชประเสริฐ; born 1 January 1983) is a Thai former professional tennis player.

Her career-high singles ranking is 172, which she reached in August 2004. Her career-high WTA doubles ranking is 357, set on 9 February 2004.

== Career ==
Viratprasert made her first appearance in 2010 and received a wildcard into the PTT Pattaya Open, but lost to Sesil Karatantcheva in the first round, 1–6, 5–7.

In her career, she won a total of nine singles titles and six doubles titles on the ITF Women's Circuit.

== Fed Cup ==
Viratprasert was also a regular competitor for the Thailand Fed Cup team, helping the team join the World Group II in 2005 and 2006, after beating Australia and Croatia in their play-off matches. In 2004, she helped the Thailand team gain promotion to World Group II, defeated the No. 1 Australian player and world No. 41 in three sets, 6–2, 1–6, 6–1. In 2005, she beat the Croatian world No. 96, Sanda Mamić in straight sets, 6–3, 7–6. Thailand finally lost to Croatia 2–3, but remained in World Group II. Viratprasert played the world No. 15, Nicole Vaidišová, in the opening rubber-match but lost in three sets, 6–3, 2–6, 0–6. But on the next day of play, she beat the world No. 45, Iveta Benešová, 6–4, 6–4.

== ITF Circuit finals ==
$50,000 tournaments
$25,000 tournaments
$10,000 tournaments

=== Singles (9–5) ===
Outcome	No.	Date	Tournament	Surface	Opponent	Score
Winner	1.	18 October 1999	Jakarta, Indonesia	Hard	(Indonesia) Irawati Iskandar	6–4, 6–1
Winner	2.	20 August 2000	Nonthaburi, Thailand	Hard	(South Korea) Jeon Mi-ra	7–5, 1–6, 6–1
Winner	3.	18 November 2001	Haibara, Japan	Grass	(Japan) Sachie Umehara	6–3, 5–7, 6–4
Winner	4.	16 February 2003	Chennai, India	Hard	(Germany) Verena Beller	6–2, 6–2
Runner-up	5.	10 August 2003	Nonthaburi, Thailand	Hard	(Chinese Taipei) Chuang Chia-jung	2–6, 1–6
Winner	6.	31 August 2003	New Delhi, India	Hard	(Malaysia) Khoo Chin-bee	6–2, 6–4
Winner	7.	14 September 2003	Bangalore, India	Grass	(India) Meghha Vakaria	6–2, 6–1
Runner-up	8.	29 February 2004	Bendigo, Australia	Hard	(Israel) Shahar Pe'er	4–6, 5–7
Winner	9.	18 September 2004	Ho Chi Minh City, Vietnam	Hard	(Russia) Goulnara Fattakhetdinova	6–4, 6–0
Runner-up	10.	13 June 2004	Beijing, China	Hard	(China) Li Na	2–6, 4–6
Runner-up	11.	29 May 2005	Shanghai, China	Hard	(Austria) Daniela Kix	6–7^{(6)}, 3–6
Runner-up	12.	3 August 2008	Obihiro, Japan	Carpet	(Japan) Kimiko Date-Krumm	3–6, 6–7^{(5)}
Winner	13.	14 September 2008	Nato, Japan	Carpet	(Japan) Kumiko Iijima	6–4, 6–4
Winner	14.	6 September 2009	Tsukuba, Japan	Hard	(Japan) Kurumi Nara	6–3, 6–4

=== Doubles (6–2) ===
Outcome	No.	Date	Tournament	Surface	Partner	Opponents	Score
Runner-up	1.	24 February 2002	Mumbai, India	Hard	(Chinese Taipei) Chao Hsiao-han	(United Kingdom) Annabel Blow (Czech Republic) Dominika Luzarová	4–6, 3–6
Winner	2.	13 October 2002	Haifa, Israel	Hard	(Netherlands) Leonie Muller van Moppe	(Hungary) Zsuzsanna Babos (Hungary) Barbara Pócza	6–3, 6–3
Winner	3.	25 May 2003	Gunma, Japan	Grass	(Japan) Kumiko Iijima	(Japan) Aiko Nakamura (Japan) Maki Arai	4–6, 7–5, 6–4
Winner	4.	17 May 2008	Bangkok, Thailand	Hard	(Thailand) Napaporn Tongsalee	(Uzbekistan) Dilyara Saidkhodjayeva (Uzbekistan) Albina Khabibulina	1–6, 7–6^{(3)}, [10–8]
Winner	5.	31 August 2008	Nonthaburi, Thailand	Hard	(Japan) Tomoko Dokei	(China) Guo Zhi-Xian (China) Yi Yang	6–4, 6–2
Winner	6.	14 June 2009	Bangkok, Thailand	Hard	(Thailand) Varatchaya Wongteanchai	(Japan) Tomoko Dokei (South Korea) Yoo Mi	6–3, 6–1
Winner	7.	26 June 2009	Bangkok, Thailand	Hard	(Thailand) Varatchaya Wongteanchai	(Japan) Tomoko Dokei (South Korea) Yoo Mi	w/o
Runner-up	8.	1 July 2013	Bangkok, Thailand	Hard	(Thailand) Napaporn Tongsalee	(China) Lu Jiaxiang (China) Lu Jiajing	4–6, 4–6
