= 2014 Malaysian Open =

- Date: April 14 – 20
- Edition: 5th
- Category: WTA International tournaments
- Draw: 32S / 16D
- Prize money: $250,000
- Surface: Hard
- Location: Kuala Lumpur, Malaysia
- Venue: Royal Selangor Golf Club

Champions

Singles
- (Croatia) Donna Vekić

Doubles
- (Hungary) Tímea Babos / (Chinese Taipei) Chan Hao-ching
← 2013 ·	Malaysian Open	· 2015 →

The 2014 BMW Malaysian Open was a women's tennis tournament played on outdoor hard courts. It was the 5th edition of the Malaysian Open and was an International tournament on the 2014 WTA Tour. The tournament took place from April 14 to 20 at the Royal Selangor Golf Club. This tournament had been discontinued, but was restarted when the rights were bought off the tournament in Palermo, Italy.

== Finals ==
=== Singles ===
- (Croatia) Donna Vekić defeated (Slovakia) Dominika Cibulková, 5–7, 7–5, 7–6^{(7–4)}

=== Doubles ===
- (Hungary) Tímea Babos / (Chinese Taipei) Chan Hao-ching defeated (Chinese Taipei) Chan Yung-jan / (China) Zheng Saisai, 6–3, 6–4

== Points and prize money ==
=== Point distribution ===
Event	W	F	SF	QF	Round of 16	Round of 32	Q	Q3	Q2	Q1
Singles	280	180	110	60	30	1	18	14	10	1
Doubles	280	180	110	60	1	—	—	—	—	—

=== Prize money ===
Event	W	F	SF	QF	Round of 16	Round of 32	Q3	Q2	Q1
Singles	$43,000	$21,400	$11,300	$5,900	$3,310	$1,925	$1,005	$730	$530
Doubles	$12,300	$6,400	$3,435	$1,820	$960	—	—	—	—

== Singles main-draw entrants ==
=== Seeds ===
Country	Player	Ranking^{1}	Seeds
SVK	Dominika Cibulková	10	1
CHN	Zhang Shuai	46	2
CZE	Karolína Plíšková	67	3
AUT	Patricia Mayr-Achleitner	81	4
JPN	Kimiko Date-Krumm	83	5
KAZ	Zarina Diyas	93	6
CRO	Donna Vekić	95	7
JPN	Ayumi Morita	112	8

- ^{1} Rankings are as of April 7, 2014.

=== Other entrants ===
The following players received wildcards into the singles main draw:

- (Greece) Eleni Daniilidou
- (Australia) Jarmila Gajdošová
- (Hong Kong) Zhang Ling

The following players received entry from the qualifying draw:

- (China) Duan Yingying
- (Italy) Giulia Gatto-Monticone
- (Japan) Eri Hozumi
- (Ukraine) Lyudmyla Kichenok
- (Turkey) Pemra Özgen
- (Croatia) Ana Vrljić

=== Withdrawals ===
Before the tournament

- (Hungary) Melinda Czink → replaced by (Montenegro) Danka Kovinić
- (Czech Republic) Andrea Hlaváčková → replaced by (Czech Republic) Kristýna Plíšková
- (Serbia) Jovana Jakšić → replaced by (Uzbekistan) Akgul Amanmuradova
- (Thailand) Luksika Kumkhum → replaced by (China) Zheng Saisai
- (United States) Venus Williams → replaced by (Serbia) Aleksandra Krunić

=== Retirements ===
- (Japan) Kimiko Date-Krumm (left calf injury)

== Doubles main-draw entrants ==
=== Seeds ===
Country	Player	Country	Player	Rank^{1}	Seed
HUN	Tímea Babos	TPE	Chan Hao-ching	59	1
CRO	Darija Jurak	USA	Megan Moulton-Levy	101	2
AUS	Jarmila Gajdošová	TPE	Hsieh Su-wei	108	3
TPE	Chan Yung-jan	CHN	Zheng Saisai	142	4

- Rankings are as of April 7, 2014.

=== Other entrants ===
The following pairs received wildcards into the doubles main draw:

- (Malaysia) Alyssa Boey / (China) Yang Zi
- (Turkey) Çağla Büyükakçay / (Turkey) Pemra Özgen

The following pair received entry as alternates:

- (Chinese Taipei) Hsieh Shu-ying / (Australia) Arina Rodionova

=== Withdrawals ===
Before the tournament

- (Japan) Kimiko Date-Krumm (left calf injury)
