= 2015 Malaysian Open =

- Date: 28 February – 8 March
- Edition: 6th
- Category: WTA International tournaments
- Draw: 32S / 16D
- Prize money: $250,000
- Surface: Hard
- Location: Kuala Lumpur, Malaysia
- Venue: Royal Selangor Golf Club

Champions

Singles
- (Denmark) Caroline Wozniacki

Doubles
- (China) Liang Chen / (China) Wang Yafan
← 2014 ·	Malaysian Open	· 2016 →

The 2015 BMW Malaysian Open was a women's tennis tournament played on outdoor hard courts. It is the 6th edition of the Malaysian Open and is an International tournament on the 2015 WTA Tour. The tournament took place from 28 February to 8 March 2015 at the Royal Selangor Golf Club. This tournament had been discontinued, but was restarted when the rights were bought off the tournament in Palermo, Italy. Caroline Wozniacki defeated Alexandra Dulgheru in the championship match for her 1st title of the year and 23rd of her career.

== Finals ==
=== Singles ===
- (Denmark) Caroline Wozniacki defeated (Romania) Alexandra Dulgheru, 4–6, 6–2, 6–1

=== Doubles ===
- (China) Liang Chen / (China) Wang Yafan defeated (Ukraine) Yuliya Beygelzimer / (Ukraine) Olga Savchuk, 4–6, 6–3, [10–4]

== Points and prize money distribution ==
=== Points distribution ===
Event	W	F	SF	QF	Round of 16	Round of 32	Q	Q3	Q2	Q1
Singles	280	180	110	60	30	1	18	14	10	1
Doubles	280	180	110	60	1	—	—	—	—	—

=== Prize money ===
Event	W	F	SF	QF	Round of 16	Round of 32	Q3	Q2	Q1
Singles	$43,000	$21,400	$11,300	$5,900	$3,310	$1,925	$1,005	$730	$530
Doubles	$12,300	$6,400	$3,435	$1,820	$960	—	—	—	—

== Singles main-draw entrants ==
=== Seeds ===
Country	Player	Ranking^{1}	Seeds
DEN	Caroline Wozniacki	5	1
GER	Sabine Lisicki	28	2
AUS	Casey Dellacqua	34	3
AUS	Jarmila Gajdošová	54	4
CZE	Klára Koukalová	58	5
JPN	Kurumi Nara	60	6
SRB	Bojana Jovanovski	63	7
GER	Julia Görges	67	8

- ^{1} Rankings are as of February 23, 2015.

=== Other entrants ===
The following players received wildcards into the singles main draw:

- (Chinese Taipei) Hsieh Su-wei
- (Malaysia) Jawairiah Noordin
- (Germany) Sabine Lisicki

The following players received entry from the qualifying draw:

- (Ukraine) Yuliya Beygelzimer
- (Russia) Elizaveta Kulichkova
- (Poland) Magda Linette
- (Japan) Junri Namigata
- (China) Wang Yafan
- (China) Xu Yifan

=== Withdrawals ===
Before the tournament

- (Kazakhstan) Zarina Diyas →replaced by Patricia Mayr-Achleitner
- (New Zealand) Marina Erakovic →replaced by Çağla Büyükakçay
- (Switzerland) Romina Oprandi →replaced by Misa Eguchi
- (Spain) Carla Suárez Navarro →replaced by Zhu Lin

== Doubles main-draw entrants ==
=== Seeds ===
Country	Player	Country	Player	Rank	Seed
CRO	Darija Jurak	CZE	Klára Koukalová	110	1
UKR	Lyudmyla Kichenok	UKR	Nadiia Kichenok	139	2
UKR	Yuliya Beygelzimer	UKR	Olga Savchuk	155	3
CHN	Xu Yifan	CHN	Zhang Kailin	171	4

- Rankings are as of February 23, 2015.

=== Other entrants ===
The following pair received wildcard into the doubles main draw:

- (Malaysia) Jawairiah Noordin / (Malaysia) Theiviya Selvarajoo
