= 2015 Malaysian Open, Kuala Lumpur =

- Date: 28 September–4 October
- Edition: 7th
- Category: World Tour 250 series
- Draw: 28S / 16D
- Prize money: $1,041,540
- Surface: Hard / indoor
- Location: Kuala Lumpur, Malaysia

Champions

Singles
- (Spain) David Ferrer

Doubles
- (Philippines) Treat Huey / (Finland) Henri Kontinen
← 2014 ·	Malaysian Open, Kuala Lumpur

The 2015 Malaysian Open, Kuala Lumpur was a men's professional tennis tournament played on hard courts. It was the seventh edition of the tournament, and part of the 2015 ATP World Tour. It took place in Kuala Lumpur, Malaysia between 28 September and 4 October 2015. First-seeded David Ferrer won the singles title.

== Singles main-draw entrants ==
=== Seeds ===
Country	Player	Rank*	Seed
ESP	David Ferrer	8	1
ESP	Feliciano López	16	2
CRO	Ivo Karlović	18	3
BUL	Grigor Dimitrov	19	4
SRB	Viktor Troicki	22	5
FRA	Jérémy Chardy	26	6
AUS	Nick Kyrgios	42	7
CAN	Vasek Pospisil	46	8

- Rankings are as of 21 September 2015

=== Other entrants ===
The following players received wild cards into the singles main draw:

- (Spain) Nicolás Almagro
- (Croatia) Ivo Karlović
- (India) Ramkumar Ramanathan

The following player received entry using a protected ranking into the singles main draw:

- (Czech Republic) Radek Štěpánek

The following players received entry from the singles qualifying draw:

- (Poland) Michał Przysiężny
- (Japan) Yūichi Sugita
- (Japan) Yasutaka Uchiyama
- (Germany) Mischa Zverev

=== Withdrawals ===
Before the tournament

- (Spain) Pablo Carreño Busta → replaced by (Germany) Benjamin Becker
- (Uruguay) Pablo Cuevas → replaced by (Germany) Alexander Zverev
- (Russia) Teymuraz Gabashvili → replaced by (Georgia (country)) Nikoloz Basilashvili
- (France) Richard Gasquet → replaced by (Japan) Tatsuma Ito
- (United States) Steve Johnson → replaced by (Colombia) Santiago Giraldo
- (France) Benoît Paire → replaced by (Moldova) Radu Albot
- (Spain) Fernando Verdasco → replaced by (Kazakhstan) Aleksandr Nedovyesov

=== Retirements ===
- (Colombia) Santiago Giraldo (Illness)
- (Kazakhstan) Aleksandr Nedovyesov (Back Injury)

== Doubles main-draw entrants ==
=== Seeds ===
Country	Player	Country	Player	Rank^{1}	Seed
RSA	Raven Klaasen	USA	Rajeev Ram	72	1
PHI	Treat Huey	FIN	Henri Kontinen	77	2
USA	Eric Butorac	USA	Scott Lipsky	86	3
GER	Andre Begemann	NZL	Artem Sitak	102	4

- Rankings are as of 21 September 2015

=== Other entrants ===
The following pairs received wildcards into the doubles main draw:

- (Australia) James Frawley / (Australia) Nick Kyrgios
- (Malaysia) Mohd Assri Merzuki / (Malaysia) Syed Mohd Agil Syed Naguib

== Finals ==
=== Singles ===
- (Spain) David Ferrer defeated (Spain) Feliciano López, 7–5, 7–5

=== Doubles ===
- (Philippines) Treat Huey / (Finland) Henri Kontinen defeated (South Africa) Raven Klaasen / (United States) Rajeev Ram, 7–6^{(7–4)}, 6–2
