= 2015 Malaysian Open, Kuala Lumpur – Doubles =

Doubles
- 2015 Malaysian Open, Kuala Lumpur

Final
- Champions: (Philippines) Treat Huey (Finland) Henri Kontinen
- Runners-up: (South Africa) Raven Klaasen (United States) Rajeev Ram
- Score: 7–6^{(7–4)}, 6–2

Events
Singles	Doubles
← 2014 ·	Malaysian Open, Kuala Lumpur

Marcin Matkowski and Leander Paes were the defending champions, but Matkowski chose not to participate. Paes played alongside Grigor Dimitrov, but lost in the first round to Rameez Junaid and Jonathan Marray.
Treat Huey and Henri Kontinen won the title, defeating Raven Klaasen and Rajeev Ram in the final, 7–6^{(7–4)}, 6–2.

== Seeds ==
1. (South Africa) Raven Klaasen / (United States) Rajeev Ram (final)
2. (Philippines) Treat Huey / (Finland) Henri Kontinen (champions)
3. (United States) Eric Butorac / (United States) Scott Lipsky (quarterfinals)
4. (Germany) Andre Begemann / (New Zealand) Artem Sitak (semifinals)

== Draw ==
=== Key ===
- Q = Qualifier
- WC = Wild card
- LL = Lucky loser
- Alt = Alternate
- SE = Special exempt
- PR = Protected ranking
- ITF = ITF entry
- JE = Junior exempt
- w/o = Walkover
- r = Retired
- d = Defaulted
- SR = Special ranking

=== Draw ===
First round
1	(South Africa) R Klaasen (United States) R Ram	6	6
WC	(Australia) J Frawley (Australia) N Kyrgios	2	3
(Australia) R Junaid (United Kingdom) J Marray	7	1	[10]
(Bulgaria) G Dimitrov (India) L Paes	5	6	[4]
3	(United States) E Butorac (United States) S Lipsky	6^{2}	6	[11]
(Belarus) A Bury (Sweden) A Siljeström	7^{7}	2	[9]
PR	(Czech Republic) F Čermák (Czech Republic) R Štěpánek	6	3	[12]
(Netherlands) W Koolhof (Netherlands) M Middelkoop	4	6	[10]
(Austria) P Oswald (Canada) A Shamasdin	7^{7}	6
(Cyprus) M Baghdatis (Serbia) V Troicki	6^{4}	2
(Australia) S Groth (Kazakhstan) M Kukushkin	2	3
4	(Germany) A Begemann (New Zealand) A Sitak	6	6
(Mexico) S González (Germany) P Petzschner	7	6
WC	(Malaysia) MA Merzuki (Malaysia) SMA Syed Naguib	5	2
(New Zealand) M Daniell (Brazil) M Demoliner	6	2	[6]
2	(Philippines) T Huey (Finland) H Kontinen	4	6	[10]

Quarterfinals
1	(South Africa) R Klaasen (United States) R Ram	7^{9}	6
(Australia) R Junaid (United Kingdom) J Marray	6^{7}	4
3	(United States) E Butorac (United States) S Lipsky	4	4
PR	(Czech Republic) F Čermák (Czech Republic) R Štěpánek	6	6
(Austria) P Oswald (Canada) A Shamasdin	4	7^{7}	[8]
4	(Germany) A Begemann (New Zealand) A Sitak	6	6^{2}	[10]
(Mexico) S González (Germany) P Petzschner	2	6	[8]
2	(Philippines) T Huey (Finland) H Kontinen	6	4	[10]

Semifinals
1	(South Africa) R Klaasen (United States) R Ram	6	6
PR	(Czech Republic) F Čermák (Czech Republic) R Štěpánek	3	4
4	(Germany) A Begemann (New Zealand) A Sitak	7^{7}	6^{2}	[7]
2	(Philippines) T Huey (Finland) H Kontinen	6^{2}	7^{7}	[10]

Final
1	(South Africa) R Klaasen (United States) R Ram	6^{4}	2
2	(Philippines) T Huey (Finland) H Kontinen	7^{7}	6
