= 2016 Malaysian Open =

- Date: 29 February – 6 March
- Edition: 7th
- Category: WTA International tournaments
- Draw: 32S / 16D
- Prize money: $250,000
- Surface: Hard
- Location: Kuala Lumpur, Malaysia
- Venue: Kuala Lumpur Golf & Country Club (KLGCC)

Champions

Singles
- (Ukraine) Elina Svitolina

Doubles
- (Thailand) Varatchaya Wongteanchai / (China) Yang Zhaoxuan
← 2015 ·	Malaysian Open	· 2017 →

The 2016 BMW Malaysian Open was a women's tennis tournament played on outdoor hard courts. It was the 7th edition of the Malaysian Open and was an International tournament on the 2016 WTA Tour. The tournament took place from 29 February to 6 March 2016 at the Kuala Lumpur Golf & Country Club (KLGCC).

== Finals ==
=== Singles ===
- (Ukraine) Elina Svitolina defeated (Canada) Eugenie Bouchard 6–7^{(5–7)}, 6–4, 7–5

=== Doubles ===
- (Thailand) Varatchaya Wongteanchai / (China) Yang Zhaoxuan defeated (China) Liang Chen / (China) Wang Yafan 4–6, 6–4, [10–7]

== Points and prize money distribution ==
=== Points distribution ===
Event	W	F	SF	QF	Round of 16	Round of 32	Q	Q3	Q2	Q1
Singles	280	180	110	60	30	1	18	14	10	1
Doubles	280	180	110	60	1	—	—	—	—	—

=== Prize money ===
Event	W	F	SF	QF	Round of 16	Round of 32	Q2	Q1
Singles	$43,000	$21,400	$11,500	$6,175	$3,400	$2,100	$1,020	$600
Doubles	$12,300	$6,400	$3,435	$1,820	$960	—	—	—

== Singles main-draw entrants ==
=== Seeds ===
Country	Player	Ranking^{1}	Seeds
ITA	Roberta Vinci	10	1
UKR	Elina Svitolina	18	2
GER	Sabine Lisicki	31	3
GER	Annika Beck	40	4
JPN	Nao Hibino	60	5
CAN	Eugenie Bouchard	61	6
TPE	Hsieh Su-wei	65	7
CHN	Zheng Saisai	72	8

- ^{1} Rankings as of February 22, 2016.

=== Other entrants ===
The following players received wildcards into the singles main draw:

- (Germany) Sabine Lisicki
- (Ukraine) Elina Svitolina
- (Italy) Roberta Vinci
- (Hong Kong) Zhang Ling

The following players received entry from the qualifying draw:

- (Japan) Miyu Kato
- (Czech Republic) Barbora Krejčíková
- (Thailand) Luksika Kumkhum
- (Japan) Risa Ozaki
- (China) Yang Zhaoxuan
- (China) Zhu Lin

=== Withdrawals ===
Before the tournament

- (United States) Alison Riske → replaced by (Chinese Taipei) Chang Kai-chen
- (Latvia) Anastasija Sevastova → replaced by (Slovakia) Jana Čepelová
- (Croatia) Ajla Tomljanović → replaced by (China) Wang Yafan

== Doubles main-draw entrants ==
=== Seeds ===
Country	Player	Country	Player	Rank	Seed
CHN	Liang Chen	CHN	Wang Yafan	87	1
CRO	Darija Jurak	USA	Nicole Melichar	113	2
TPE	Chan Chin-wei	CZE	Barbora Krejčíková	143	3
RUS	Marina Melnikova	RUS	Alexandra Panova	151	4

- Rankings as of February 22, 2016.

=== Other entrants ===
The following pair received wildcard into the doubles main draw:

- (Japan) Nao Hibino / (Hong Kong) Zhang Ling
- (China) Liu Fangzhou / (Malaysia) Jawairiah Noordin
