= 2013 Malaysian Open =

- Date: February 25 – March 3
- Edition: 4th
- Category: WTA International
- Draw: 32S / 16D
- Prize money: $235,000
- Surface: Hard
- Location: Kuala Lumpur, Malaysia
- Venue: Royal Selangor Golf Club

Champions

Singles
- (Czech Republic) Karolína Plíšková

Doubles
- (Japan) Shuko Aoyama / (Chinese Taipei) Chang Kai-chen
- Malaysian Open

The 2013 BMW Malaysian Open was a women's tennis tournament played on outdoor hard courts. It was the fourth edition of the Malaysian Open and was an International tournament on the 2013 WTA Tour. The tournament took place from February 25 to March 3 at the new venue Royal Selangor Golf Club. This was the last time that Malaysia hosted the event, as in 2014 it will move to Hong Kong, China.

== Finals ==
=== Singles ===
- (Czech Republic) Karolína Plíšková defeated (United States) Bethanie Mattek-Sands, 1–6, 7–5, 6–3

=== Doubles ===
- (Japan) Shuko Aoyama / (Chinese Taipei) Chang Kai-chen defeated (Slovakia) Janette Husárová / (China) Zhang Shuai, 6–7^{(4–7)}, 7–6^{(7–4)}, [14–12]

== Singles main-draw entrants ==
=== Seeds ===
Country	Player	Ranking^{1}	Seeds
DEN	Caroline Wozniacki	10	1
TPE	Hsieh Su-wei	25	2
RUS	Anastasia Pavlyuchenkova	29	3
JPN	Ayumi Morita	55	4
JPN	Misaki Doi	82	5
CRO	Donna Vekić	90	6
GRE	Eleni Daniilidou	94	7
CZE	Kristýna Plíšková	99	8

- ^{1} Rankings are as of February 18, 2013.

=== Other entrants ===
The following players received wildcards into the main draw:

- (Malaysia) Aslina Chua
- (United States) Bethanie Mattek-Sands
- (Russia) Anastasia Pavlyuchenkova

The following players received entry from the qualifying draw:

- (Uzbekistan) Akgul Amanmuradova
- (Kazakhstan) Zarina Diyas
- (Thailand) Luksika Kumkhum
- (Thailand) Nudnida Luangnam
- (South Africa) Chanel Simmonds
- (China) Wang Qiang

=== Withdrawals ===
Before the tournament

- (Slovakia) Daniela Hantuchová
- (Serbia) Bojana Jovanovski
- (Kazakhstan) Yulia Putintseva
- (Thailand) Tamarine Tanasugarn
- (Chinese Taipei) Chan Yung-jan

== Doubles main-draw entrants ==
=== Seeds ===
Country	Player	Country	Player	Rank^{1}	Seed
SVK	Janette Husárová	CHN	Zhang Shuai	82	1
JPN	Shuko Aoyama	TPE	Chang Kai-chen	139	2
UKR	Irina Buryachok	TPE	Chan Hao-ching	146	3
JPN	Rika Fujiwara	CHN	Zheng Saisai	171	4

- ^{1} Rankings are as of February 18, 2013.

=== Other entrants ===
The following pairs received wildcards into the doubles main draw:

- (Malaysia) Aslina An Ping Chua / (China) Yang Zi
- (Malaysia) Yus Syazlin Nabila / (Malaysia) Theiviya Selvarajoo
