= 2014 Malaysian Open, Kuala Lumpur – Doubles =

Doubles
- 2014 Malaysian Open, Kuala Lumpur

Final
- Champions: (Poland) Marcin Matkowski (India) Leander Paes
- Runners-up: (United Kingdom) Jamie Murray (Australia) John Peers
- Score: 3–6, 7–6^{(7–5)}, [10–5]

Events
Singles	Doubles
← 2013 ·	Malaysian Open, Kuala Lumpur	· 2015 →

The 2014 Malaysian Open, Kuala Lumpur was a professional tennis tournament played on hard courts. It was the sixth edition of the tournament, and part of the 2014 ATP World Tour. It took place in Kuala Lumpur, Malaysia between 22 and 28 September 2014.

Eric Butorac and Raven Klaasen were the defending champions, but lost to Andre Begemann and Julian Knowle in the first round.

Marcin Matkowski and Leander Paes won the title, defeating Jamie Murray and John Peers in the final, 3–6, 7–6^{(7–5)}, [10–5].

== Seeds ==
1. (United States) Eric Butorac / (South Africa) Raven Klaasen (first round)
2. (United Kingdom) Jamie Murray / (Australia) John Peers (final)
3. (United Kingdom) Dominic Inglot / (Romania) Florin Mergea (semifinals)
4. (Poland) Marcin Matkowski / (India) Leander Paes (champions)

== Draw ==
=== Key ===
- Q = Qualifier
- WC = Wild card
- LL = Lucky loser
- Alt = Alternate
- SE = Special exempt
- PR = Protected ranking
- ITF = ITF entry
- JE = Junior exempt
- w/o = Walkover
- r = Retired
- d = Defaulted
- SR = Special ranking

=== Draw ===
First round
1	(United States) E Butorac (South Africa) R Klaasen	1	6	[6]
(Germany) A Begemann (Austria) J Knowle	6	3	[10]
(United States) S Lipsky (United States) R Ram	4	6	[12]
(Spain) P Andújar (Austria) P Oswald	6	3	[10]
4	(Poland) M Matkowski (India) L Paes	6	6
(Australia) M Matosevic (Australia) B Tomic	1	3
WC	(Austria) J Melzer (Germany) P Petzschner	6	7
(Uruguay) P Cuevas (Mexico) S González	2	5
(Argentina) L Mayer (Portugal) J Sousa	7^{7}	6
(Italy) D Bracciali (Austria) O Marach	6^{5}	3
(Germany) F Moser (Germany) A Satschko	4	4
3	(United Kingdom) D Inglot (Romania) F Mergea	6	6
(Germany) B Becker (Australia) R Junaid	w/o
(Croatia) M Draganja (Finland) H Kontinen
WC	(Australia) N Kyrgios (Malaysia) SMA Syed Naguib	3	4
2	(United Kingdom) J Murray (Australia) J Peers	6	6

Quarterfinals
(Germany) A Begemann (Austria) J Knowle	6	6
(United States) S Lipsky (United States) R Ram	3	3
4	(Poland) M Matkowski (India) L Paes	6	6^{5}	[10]
WC	(Austria) J Melzer (Germany) P Petzschner	2	7^{7}	[6]
(Argentina) L Mayer (Portugal) J Sousa	6^{3}	6	8
3	(United Kingdom) D Inglot (Romania) F Mergea	7^{7}	4	[10]
(Germany) B Becker (Australia) R Junaid	6^{2}	0
2	(United Kingdom) J Murray (Australia) J Peers	7^{7}	6

Semifinals
(Germany) A Begemann (Austria) J Knowle	2	4
4	(Poland) M Matkowski (India) L Paes	6	6
3	(United Kingdom) D Inglot (Romania) F Mergea	2	6^{0}
2	(United Kingdom) J Murray (Australia) J Peers	6	7^{7}

Final
4	(Poland) M Matkowski (India) L Paes	3	7^{7}	[10]
2	(United Kingdom) J Murray (Australia) J Peers	6	6^{5}	[5]
