= 2016 Malaysian Open – Doubles =

Doubles
- 2016 Malaysian Open

Final
- Champions: (Thailand) Varatchaya Wongteanchai (China) Yang Zhaoxuan
- Runners-up: (China) Liang Chen (China) Wang Yafan
- Score: 4–6, 6–4, [10–7]

Details
- Draw: 16
- Seeds: 4

Events
Singles	Doubles
← 2015 ·	Malaysian Open	· 2017 →

Liang Chen and Wang Yafan were the defending champions, but lost in the final to Varatchaya Wongteanchai and Yang Zhaoxuan, 4–6, 6–4, [10–7].

== Seeds ==
1. (China) Liang Chen / (China) Wang Yafan (final)
2. (Croatia) Darija Jurak / (United States) Nicole Melichar (first round)
3. (Chinese Taipei) Chan Chin-wei / (Czech Republic) Barbora Krejčíková (first round)
4. (Russia) Marina Melnikova / (Russia) Alexandra Panova (quarterfinals)

== Draw ==
=== Key ===
- Q = Qualifier
- WC = Wild card
- LL = Lucky loser
- Alt = Alternate
- SE = Special exempt
- PR = Protected ranking
- ITF = ITF entry
- JE = Junior exempt
- w/o = Walkover
- r = Retired
- d = Defaulted
- SR = Special ranking

First round
1	(China) C Liang (China) Y Wang	6	2	[10]
(Poland) M Linette (China) K Zhang	3	6	[5]
(Chinese Taipei) K-c Chang (Georgia (country)) O Kalashnikova	7^{7}	6
(Russia) V Ivakhnenko (Belarus) L Marozava	6^{5}	4
4	(Russia) M Melnikova (Russia) A Panova	6	6
(Thailand) Pe Plipuech (Japan) K Takahata	2	1
(Poland) K Piter (Ukraine) M Zanevska	6	6^{1}	[11]
(United Kingdom) N Broady (Turkey) Ç Büyükakçay	4	7^{7}	[9]
(Thailand) Vara Wongteanchai (China) Z Yang	6	6
(Czech Republic) L Kunčíková (Czech Republic) K Stuchlá	4	2
(Japan) E Hozumi (Japan) M Kato	6	7^{7}
3	(Chinese Taipei) C-w Chan (Czech Republic) B Krejčíková	3	6^{2}
WC	(China) F Liu (Malaysia) J Noordin	3	4
WC	(Japan) N Hibino (Hong Kong) L Zhang	6	6
(Kazakhstan) Z Diyas (China) Y Xu	7^{7}	6
2	(Croatia) D Jurak (United States) N Melichar	6^{5}	1

Quarterfinals
1	(China) C Liang (China) Y Wang	4	6	[10]
(Chinese Taipei) K-c Chang (Georgia (country)) O Kalashnikova	6	3	[5]
4	(Russia) M Melnikova (Russia) A Panova	2	7^{7}	[8]
(Poland) K Piter (Ukraine) M Zanevska	6	6^{2}	[10]
(Thailand) Vara Wongteanchai (China) Z Yang	6	6
(Japan) E Hozumi (Japan) M Kato	2	1
WC	(Japan) N Hibino (Hong Kong) L Zhang	1	2
(Kazakhstan) Z Diyas (China) Y Xu	6	6

Semifinals
1	(China) C Liang (China) Y Wang	6	7^{7}
(Poland) K Piter (Ukraine) M Zanevska	3	6^{3}
(Thailand) Vara Wongteanchai (China) Z Yang	6	6
(Kazakhstan) Z Diyas (China) Y Xu	4	4

Final
1	(China) C Liang (China) Y Wang	6	4	[7]
(Thailand) Vara Wongteanchai (China) Z Yang	4	6	[10]
