= Lim Bong Soo =

Straits Settlements tennis player

- Full name: Lim Bong Soo
- Country (sports): Straits Settlements
- Born: 1900 Singapore in the Straits Settlements
- Died: May 6, 1992 (Age 92) Singapore
- Turned pro: 1936

Singles
- Career titles: 12+

Lim Bong Soo (1900 - May 6, 1992) was a Singaporean tennis player. He was a four time winner of the Malayan Championships.

== Career ==
Lim won the Singapore Championships six years in a row from 1930 to 1935. He also won the Hong Kong singles title in 1929 and was Chinese national champion in 1931. He took his first Malayan Championships title in 1931 beating Lam Say Kee in the final. In 1932 he won his second title beating Alexander Pitt, an Englishman resident in India. In 1933 he won his third consecutive title beating H. M. De Souza in the final. He won his final Malayan Championships in 1935 over Nguyen van Chim. He turned down the opportunity of playing at Wimbledon. Speaking about his tennis career in an interview in 1983, Lim said he worked hard, studied his opponents and applied science to his game and said he was an all-rounder with no weakness. In 1936 Lim turned professional to become coach at the Tanglin Club.

== Personal life ==
Lim was born in Singapore around 1900. He died aged 92 in 1992.
