= 2016 Malaysian Open – Singles =

Singles
- 2016 Malaysian Open

Final
- Champion: (Ukraine) Elina Svitolina
- Runner-up: (Canada) Eugenie Bouchard
- Score: 6–7^{(5–7)}, 6–4, 7–5

Details
- Draw: 32
- Seeds: 8

Events
Singles	Doubles
- Malaysian Open

Caroline Wozniacki was the defending champion, but chose to compete in Monterrey instead.

Elina Svitolina won the title, defeating Eugenie Bouchard in the final, 6–7^{(5–7)}, 6–4, 7–5.

== Seeds ==
1. (Italy) Roberta Vinci (first round)
2. (Ukraine) Elina Svitolina (champion)
3. (Germany) Sabine Lisicki (quarterfinals)
4. (Germany) Annika Beck (first round)
5. (Japan) Nao Hibino (first round)
6. (Canada) Eugenie Bouchard (final)
7. (Chinese Taipei) Hsieh Su-wei (second round)
8. (China) Zheng Saisai (first round)

== Draw ==
Key

- Q = Qualifier
- WC = Wild card
- LL = Lucky loser
- Alt = Alternate
- ITF = ITF entry
- PR = Protected ranking
- SR = Special ranking
- SE = Special exempt
- JE = Junior exempt
- JR = Junior Accelerator Programme entrant
- CO = College Accelerator Programme entrant
- NG = Next Gen Accelerator Program entrant
- w/o = Walkover
- r = Retired
- d = Defaulted

=== Finals ===
Semifinals
6	(Canada) Eugenie Bouchard	6	6
(United Kingdom) Naomi Broady	4	3
Q	(China) Zhu Lin	3	3
2/WC	(Ukraine) Elina Svitolina	6	6

Final
6	(Canada) Eugenie Bouchard	7^{7}	4	5
2/WC	(Ukraine) Elina Svitolina	6^{5}	6	7

=== Top half ===
First round
1/WC	(Italy) R Vinci	7	2	1
(Chinese Taipei) K-c Chang	5	6	6
(Turkey) Ç Büyükakçay	7	6
(Germany) L Siegemund	5	1
(Slovakia) D Hantuchová	4	7^{7}	6^{10}
(Japan) K Nara	6	6^{4}	7^{12}
WC	(Hong Kong) L Zhang	3	1
6	(Canada) E Bouchard	6	6
3/WC	(Germany) S Lisicki	6	7^{7}
(Poland) M Linette	4	6^{5}
Q	(Czech Republic) B Krejčíková	6	1	6
(China) Y Wang	4	6	2
(United Kingdom) N Broady	6	3	6
(Czech Republic) K Koukalová	3	6	3
Q	(China) Z Yang	4	6	6
8	(China) S Zheng	6	3	2

Second round
(Chinese Taipei) K-c Chang	5	3
(Turkey) Ç Büyükakçay	7	6
(Japan) K Nara	1	2
6	(Canada) E Bouchard	6	6
3/WC	(Germany) S Lisicki	7	6
Q	(Czech Republic) B Krejčíková	5	3
(United Kingdom) N Broady	6	6
Q	(China) Z Yang	4	3

Quarterfinals
(Turkey) Ç Büyükakçay	1	4
6	(Canada) E Bouchard	6	6
3/WC	(Germany) S Lisicki	6^{4}	6	5
(United Kingdom) N Broady	7^{7}	1	7

Semifinals
6	(Canada) E Bouchard	6	6
(United Kingdom) N Broady	4	3

=== Bottom half ===
First round
5	(Japan) N Hibino	4	2
(China) Y Duan	6	6
(China) Q Wang	6	6
Q	(Thailand) L Kumkhum	2	1
Q	(China) L Zhu	6	6
(Russia) A Panova	4	4
(Kazakhstan) Z Diyas	7	6
4	(Germany) A Beck	5	3
7	(Chinese Taipei) S-w Hsieh	6	6
(Slovakia) J Čepelová	4	4
(Slovakia) K Kučová	7^{7}	6
(Switzerland) S Vögele	6^{4}	4
(Russia) E Kulichkova	0	2
Q	(Japan) R Ozaki	6	6
Q	(Japan) M Kato	1	1
2/WC	(Ukraine) E Svitolina	6	6

Second round
(China) Y Duan	4	4
(China) Q Wang	6	6
Q	(China) L Zhu	7	6
(Kazakhstan) Z Diyas	5	2
7	(Chinese Taipei) S-w Hsieh	1	6	3
(Slovakia) K Kučová	6	3	6
Q	(Japan) R Ozaki	1	6	0
2/WC	(Ukraine) E Svitolina	6	3	6

Quarterfinals
(China) Q Wang	3	4
Q	(China) L Zhu	6	6
(Slovakia) K Kučová	6	1	1
2/WC	(Ukraine) E Svitolina	1	6	6

Semifinals
Q	(China) L Zhu	3	3
2/WC	(Ukraine) E Svitolina	6	6

== Qualifying ==
=== Seeds ===
1. (Japan) Risa Ozaki (qualified)
2. (Ukraine) Maryna Zanevska (first round)
3. (China) Zhang Kailin (qualifying competition)
4. (Thailand) Luksika Kumkhum (qualified)
5. (Japan) Miyu Kato (qualified)
6. (China) Yang Zhaoxuan (qualified)
7. (China) Zhang Yuxuan (first round)
8. (Czech Republic) Barbora Krejčíková (qualified)
9. (China) Zhu Lin (qualified)
10. (Russia) Polina Leykina (qualifying competition)
11. (China) Liu Chang (first round)
12. (China) Lu Jiajing (first round)

=== Qualifiers ===
1. (Japan) Risa Ozaki
2. (China) Zhu Lin
3. (Czech Republic) Barbora Krejčíková
4. (Thailand) Luksika Kumkhum
5. (Japan) Miyu Kato
6. (China) Yang Zhaoxuan

=== Draw ===
==== First qualifier ====
First round
1	(Japan) Risa Ozaki	3	7^{7}	6
(Spain) Laura Pous Tió	6	6^{4}	0
(Poland) Katarzyna Piter	3	6	6
7	(China) Zhang Yuxuan	6	1	1

Qualifying competition
1	(Japan) Risa Ozaki	6	7^{7}
(Poland) Katarzyna Piter	1	6^{4}

==== Second qualifier ====
First round
2	(Ukraine) Maryna Zanevska	7	5	4
(Russia) Marina Melnikova	5	7	6
Alt	(Russia) Valentyna Ivakhnenko	6	5	4
9	(China) Zhu Lin	1	7	6

Qualifying competition
(Russia) Marina Melnikova	6^{4}	7	3
9	(China) Zhu Lin	7^{7}	5	6

==== Third qualifier ====
First round
3	(China) Zhang Kailin	6	4	6
(Japan) Eri Hozumi	2	6	0
(Slovenia) Tadeja Majerič	3	0
8	(Czech Republic) Barbora Krejčíková	6	6

Qualifying competition
3	(China) Zhang Kailin	3	2
8	(Czech Republic) Barbora Krejčíková	6	6

==== Fourth qualifier ====
First round
4	(Thailand) Luksika Kumkhum	6	3	6
(China) Xu Yifan	1	6	4
WC	(Thailand) Varatchaya Wongteanchai	6	6
12	(China) Lu Jiajing	3	3

Qualifying competition
4	(Thailand) Luksika Kumkhum	6	4	6
WC	(Thailand) Varatchaya Wongteanchai	4	6	3

==== Fifth qualifier ====
First round
5	(Japan) Miyu Kato	3	7	6
(China) Lu Jingjing	6	5	0
WC	(Malaysia) Nurin Nabilah Roslan	1	0
10	(Russia) Polina Leykina	6	6

Qualifying competition
5	(Japan) Miyu Kato	4	6	6
10	(Russia) Polina Leykina	6	2	1

==== Sixth qualifier ====
First round
6	(China) Yang Zhaoxuan	6	4	6
WC	(Malaysia) Jawairiah Noordin	2	6	0
(China) Liu Fangzhou	6	4	6
11	(China) Liu Chang	1	6	3

Qualifying competition
6	(China) Yang Zhaoxuan	5	7^{7}	7
(China) Liu Fangzhou	7	6^{3}	5
