= 2015 Malaysian Open – Singles =

Singles
- 2015 Malaysian Open

Final
- Champion: (Denmark) Caroline Wozniacki
- Runner-up: (Romania) Alexandra Dulgheru
- Score: 4–6, 6–2, 6–1

Details
- Draw: 32
- Seeds: 8

Events
Singles	Doubles
- Malaysian Open

Donna Vekić was the defending champion, but chose not to participate this year.

Caroline Wozniacki won the title, defeating Alexandra Dulgheru in the final, 4–6, 6–2, 6–1.

== Seeds ==
1. (Denmark) Caroline Wozniacki (champion)
2. (Germany) Sabine Lisicki (first round)
3. (Australia) Casey Dellacqua (first round)
4. (Australia) Jarmila Gajdošová (semifinals)
5. (Czech Republic) Klára Koukalová (second round)
6. (Japan) Kurumi Nara (quarterfinals)
7. (Serbia) Bojana Jovanovski (first round)
8. (Germany) Julia Görges (quarterfinals)

== Draw ==
Key

- Q = Qualifier
- WC = Wild card
- LL = Lucky loser
- Alt = Alternate
- ITF = ITF entry
- PR = Protected ranking
- SR = Special ranking
- SE = Special exempt
- JE = Junior exempt
- JR = Junior Accelerator Programme entrant
- CO = College Accelerator Programme entrant
- NG = Next Gen Accelerator Program entrant
- w/o = Walkover
- r = Retired
- d = Defaulted

=== Finals ===
Semifinals
1	(Denmark) Caroline Wozniacki	6	6
WC	(Chinese Taipei) Hsieh Su-wei	2	2
4	(Australia) Jarmila Gajdošová	7	5	6^{4}
(Romania) Alexandra Dulgheru	5	7	7^{7}

Final
1	(Denmark) Caroline Wozniacki	4	6	6
(Romania) Alexandra Dulgheru	6	2	1

=== Top half ===
First round
1	(Denmark) C Wozniacki	6	6
Q	(China) Y Wang	3	1
Q	(Ukraine) Y Beygelzimer	4	6	3
(China) L Zhu	6	4	6
(Japan) M Doi	5	5
(Germany) C Witthöft	7	7
(Austria) P Mayr-Achleitner	1	3
5	(Czech Republic) K Koukalová	6	6
3	(Australia) C Dellacqua	5	6	3
WC	(Chinese Taipei) S-w Hsieh	7	2	6
(Belgium) A-S Mestach	6	5	3
(Japan) M Eguchi	2	7	6
(Kazakhstan) Y Putintseva	6	6
WC	(Malaysia) J Noordin	2	1
Q	(Russia) E Kulichkova	6	6
7	(Serbia) B Jovanovski	3	3

Second round
1	(Denmark) C Wozniacki	6	6
(China) L Zhu	4	1
(Germany) C Witthöft	7^{7}	6
5	(Czech Republic) K Koukalová	6^{3}	0
WC	(Chinese Taipei) S-w Hsieh	6	3	6
(Japan) M Eguchi	3	6	0
(Kazakhstan) Y Putintseva	0	2
Q	(Russia) E Kulichkova	6	6

Quarterfinals
1	(Denmark) C Wozniacki	6	6
(Germany) C Witthöft	3	1
WC	(Chinese Taipei) S-w Hsieh	7^{7}	4	6
Q	(Russia) E Kulichkova	6^{4}	6	0

Semifinals
1	(Denmark) C Wozniacki	6	6
WC	(Chinese Taipei) S-w Hsieh	2	2

=== Bottom half ===
First round
6	(Japan) K Nara	6	7^{7}
(Switzerland) S Vögele	3	6^{4}
(China) Q Wang	6	3	0
Q	(Poland) M Linette	2	6	6
Q	(Japan) J Namigata	3	6^{4}
(Thailand) L Kumkhum	6	7^{7}
(Turkey) Ç Büyükakçay	5	4
4	(Australia) J Gajdošová	7	6
8	(Germany) J Görges	6	7^{7}
(Russia) A Kudryavtseva	1	6^{2}
(Ukraine) K Kozlova	6	6
(China) S Zheng	3	4
(China) Y Duan	6	3	6
Q	(China) Y Xu	0	6	3
(Romania) A Dulgheru	6	7
2/WC	(Germany) S Lisicki	4	5

Second round
6	(Japan) K Nara	7	5	7^{8}
Q	(Poland) M Linette	5	7	6^{6}
(Thailand) L Kumkhum	5	2
4	(Australia) J Gajdošová	7	6
8	(Germany) J Görges	6	6
(Ukraine) K Kozlova	1	2
(China) Y Duan	4	1
(Romania) A Dulgheru	6	6

Quarterfinals
6	(Japan) K Nara	4	6	4
4	(Australia) J Gajdošová	6	3	6
8	(Germany) J Görges	6^{5}	5
(Romania) A Dulgheru	7^{7}	7

Semifinals
4	(Australia) J Gajdošová	7	5	6^{4}
(Romania) A Dulgheru	5	7	7^{7}

== Qualifying ==
=== Seeds ===
1. (Russia) Daria Gavrilova (qualifying competition)
2. (China) Zhu Lin (moved to the main draw)
3. (Poland) Magda Linette (qualified)
4. (Ukraine) Yuliya Beygelzimer (qualified)
5. (China) Wang Yafan (qualified)
6. (China) Xu Yifan (qualified)
7. (Uzbekistan) Nigina Abduraimova (qualifying competition)
8. (China) Zhang Kailin (qualifying competition)
9. (United Kingdom) Naomi Broady (qualifying competition)
10. (China) Liu Fangzhou (qualifying competition)
11. (Russia) Elizaveta Kulichkova (qualified)
12. (Japan) Risa Ozaki (first round)
13. (Japan) Junri Namigata (qualified)

=== Qualifiers ===
1. (Russia) Elizaveta Kulichkova
2. (Japan) Junri Namigata
3. (Poland) Magda Linette
4. (Ukraine) Yuliya Beygelzimer
5. (China) Wang Yafan
6. (China) Xu Yifan

=== Draw ===
==== First qualifier ====
First round
1	(Russia) Daria Gavrilova	6	6
(China) Yang Zhaoxuan	4	2
WC	(Malaysia) Theiviya Selvarajoo	2	2
11	(Russia) Elizaveta Kulichkova	6	6

Qualifying competition
1	(Russia) Daria Gavrilova	6	3	4
11	(Russia) Elizaveta Kulichkova	1	6	6

==== Second qualifier ====
First round
13	(Japan) Junri Namigata	7^{7}	6
(China) Liang Chen	6^{2}	4
(Ukraine) Lyudmyla Kichenok	6	7^{7}
12	(Japan) Risa Ozaki	4	6^{5}

Qualifying competition
13	(Japan) Junri Namigata	7^{7}	6
(Ukraine) Lyudmyla Kichenok	6^{5}	0

==== Third qualifier ====
First round
3	(Poland) Magda Linette	6	7
(Georgia (country)) Sofia Shapatava	3	5
(Chinese Taipei) Chang Kai-chen	5	7^{9}	5
10	(China) Liu Fangzhou	7	6^{7}	7

Qualifying competition
3	(Poland) Magda Linette	6	6
10	(China) Liu Fangzhou	2	1

==== Fourth qualifier ====
First round
4	(Ukraine) Yuliya Beygelzimer	6	6^{8}	7^{7}
(Ukraine) Nadiia Kichenok	4	7^{10}	6^{5}
(Thailand) Tamarine Tanasugarn	6	1	3
8	(China) Zhang Kailin	4	6	6

Qualifying competition
4	(Ukraine) Yuliya Beygelzimer	6	7^{7}
8	(China) Zhang Kailin	4	6^{2}

==== Fifth qualifier ====
First round
5	(China) Wang Yafan	6	6
Alt	(Croatia) Darija Jurak	3	1
(Poland) Katarzyna Piter	6^{6}	6^{4}
7	(Uzbekistan) Nigina Abduraimova	7^{8}	7^{7}

Qualifying competition
5	(China) Wang Yafan	6	6
7	(Uzbekistan) Nigina Abduraimova	4	2

==== Sixth qualifier ====
First round
6	(China) Xu Yifan	6	6
(Ukraine) Olga Savchuk	3	4
(United Kingdom) Emily Webley-Smith	2	7	2
9	(United Kingdom) Naomi Broady	6	5	6

Qualifying competition
6	(China) Xu Yifan	7	6
9	(United Kingdom) Naomi Broady	5	2
