= Khoo Hooi-Hye =

Straits Settlements tennis player

- Full name: Khoo Hooi-Hye
- Country (sports): Straits Settlements
- Born: March 15, 1901 Penang
- Died: July 26, 1936 (aged 35) Penang
- Retired: 1936

Singles
- Career titles: 15+

Grand Slam singles results
- Wimbledon: 2R (1924)

Khoo Hooi-Hye (March 15, 1901 - July 26, 1936) was a tennis player from Penang (Straits Settlements, now part of Malaysia) in the 1920s and early 1930s.

== Career ==
Khoo was born at Penang in March 1901. He was a grandson of the late Hokkien leader Khoo Thean Teik and was educated at Penang Free School. Khoo won the Malayan Championships for the first time in 1923 beating Scovell in the final. He took his second title in 1925 over Kenneth Mano. In 1926 he won his third title against Chua Choon Leong. He beat Ong Ee Kong to win his fourth title in 1927. He won his fifth and final title in 1929 against Lim Bong Soo. He also won the Singapore Championships five times in a row from 1925 to 1929. He played at Wimbledon in 1924 and lost in the second round to Syed Mohammad Hadi. He was also runner-up in the Isle of Wight Championships that year. He won the Far Eastern Championship Games title in 1927. In later years, he lived in Shanghai. In 1935, Hooi-Hye was convicted of rash driving, which resulted in a Chinese girl dying. He died the following year aged 35. His death was believed to be from kidney trouble.
