= 2014 Malaysian Open, Kuala Lumpur – Singles =

Singles
- 2014 Malaysian Open, Kuala Lumpur

Final
- Champion: (Japan) Kei Nishikori
- Runner-up: (France) Julien Benneteau
- Score: 7–6^{(7–4)}, 6–4

Details
- Draw: 28
- Seeds: 8

Events
Singles	Doubles
← 2013 ·	Malaysian Open, Kuala Lumpur	· 2015 →

João Sousa was the defending champion, but lost to Benjamin Becker in the first round.
Kei Nishikori won the title, defeating Julien Benneteau in the final, 7–6^{(7–4)}, 6–4.

== Seeds ==
The top four seeds receive a bye into the second round.

1. (Japan) Kei Nishikori (champion)
2. (Latvia) Ernests Gulbis (semifinals)
3. (Argentina) Leonardo Mayer (second round)
4. (France) Julien Benneteau (final)
5. (Uruguay) Pablo Cuevas (quarterfinals)
6. (Portugal) João Sousa (first round)
7. (Spain) Pablo Andújar (quarterfinals)
8. (Australia) Nick Kyrgios (first round)

== Draw ==
=== Key ===
- Q = Qualifier
- WC = Wild card
- LL = Lucky loser
- Alt = Alternate
- SE = Special exempt
- PR = Protected ranking
- ITF = ITF entry
- JE = Junior exempt
- w/o = Walkover
- r = Retired
- d = Defaulted
- SR = Special ranking

=== Finals ===
Semifinals
1	(Japan) Kei Nishikori	6	4	6
(Finland) Jarkko Nieminen	3	6	2
4	(France) Julien Benneteau	6	6
2	(Latvia) Ernests Gulbis	4	4

Final
1	(Japan) Kei Nishikori	7^{7}	6
4	(France) Julien Benneteau	6^{4}	4

=== Top half ===
First round
WC	(Australia) O Jasika	6	5	3
(United States) R Ram	4	7	6
(Japan) G Soeda	6	6
Q	(Japan) K Takeuchi	2	1
(Australia) M Matosevic	7^{7}	7^{7}
8	(Australia) N Kyrgios	6^{4}	6^{3}
Q	(Austria) P Oswald	1	2
(Finland) J Nieminen	6	6
(Tunisia) M Jaziri	6	4	2
(Poland) M Przysiężny	4	6	6
(France) G Burquier	2	4
7	(Spain) P Andújar	6	6

Second round
1	(Japan) K Nishikori	6	6
(United States) R Ram	2	3
(Japan) G Soeda	6^{5}	4
(Australia) M Matosevic	7^{7}	6
3	(Argentina) L Mayer	6^{5}	4
(Finland) J Nieminen	7^{7}	6
(Poland) M Przysiężny	4	7^{8}	3
7	(Spain) P Andújar	6	6^{6}	6

Quarterfinals
1	(Japan) K Nishikori	6	6
(Australia) M Matosevic	3	0
(Finland) J Nieminen	6	6
7	(Spain) P Andújar	3	4

Semifinals
1	(Japan) K Nishikori	6	4	6
(Finland) J Nieminen	3	6	2

=== Bottom half ===
First round
5	(Uruguay) P Cuevas	6	7^{7}
PR	(Austria) J Melzer	4	6^{1}
(Japan) H Moriya	6^{6}	1
(Croatia) I Dodig	7^{8}	6
WC	(Serbia) F Krajinović	6	6
WC	(Japan) T Daniel	2	4
6	(Portugal) J Sousa	6^{1}	2
(Germany) B Becker	7^{7}	6
(Australia) B Tomic	4	6	6^{7}
(France) P-H Herbert	6	3	7^{9}
Q	(United Kingdom) J Ward	4	6	6^{5}
Q	(Germany) P Petzschner	6	3	7^{7}

Second round
5	(Uruguay) P Cuevas	3	7	7
(Croatia) I Dodig	6	5	5
WC	(Serbia) F Krajinović	4	3
4	(France) J Benneteau	6	6
(Germany) B Becker	6	7^{7}
(France) P-H Herbert	4	6^{4}
Q	(Germany) P Petzschner	3	7^{7}	1
2	(Latvia) E Gulbis	6	6^{3}	6

Quarterfinals
5	(Uruguay) P Cuevas	3	7^{7}	4
4	(France) J Benneteau	6	6^{3}	6
(Germany) B Becker	3	5
2	(Latvia) E Gulbis	6	7

Semifinals
4	(France) J Benneteau	6	6
2	(Latvia) E Gulbis	4	4

== Qualifying ==
=== Seeds ===
1. (United Kingdom) James Ward (qualified)
2. (India) Jeevan Nedunchezhiyan (qualifying competition)
3. (Japan) Takuto Niki (qualifying competition)
4. (Japan) Kento Takeuchi (qualified)
5. (Germany) Philipp Petzschner (qualified)
6. (Japan) Bumpei Sato (qualifying competition)
7. (India) N Vijay Sundar Prashanth (qualifying competition)
8. (Austria) Oliver Marach (second round, retired)

=== Qualifiers ===
1. (United Kingdom) James Ward
2. (Germany) Philipp Petzschner
3. (Austria) Philipp Oswald
4. (Japan) Kento Takeuchi

=== Qualifying draw ===
==== First qualifier ====
Second round
1	(United Kingdom) James Ward	6	6
WC	(Malaysia) Hao Sheng Koay	0	0
(Australia) John Peers	6^{4}	6	1
7	(India) N Vijay Sundar Prashanth	7^{7}	4	6

Qualifying competition
1	(United Kingdom) James Ward	6	6
7	(India) N Vijay Sundar Prashanth	2	1

==== Second qualifier ====
First round				Second round				Qualifying competition
				2	(India) Jeevan Nedunchezhiyan	6	6
(United Kingdom) Joe Cooper		3	3		(Croatia) Stefan Merunka	0	0
(Croatia) Stefan Merunka		6	6					2	(India) Jeevan Nedunchezhiyan	5	2
WC	(Malaysia) Muhammad-Ashaari Bin Zainal Abidin	3	3					5	(Germany) Philipp Petzschner	7	6
	(United States) Scott Lipsky	6	6		(United States) Scott Lipsky	4	4
				5	(Germany) Philipp Petzschner	6	6

==== Third qualifier ====
First round				Second round				Qualifying competition
				3	(Japan) Takuto Niki	6	6
WC	(Malaysia) Syed Mohd Agil Syed Naguib	6	6	WC	(Malaysia) Syed Mohd Agil Syed Naguib	3	0
WC	(Malaysia) Mohd Assri Merzuki	0	3					3	(Japan) Takuto Niki	3	6	3
(Mexico) Santiago González		4	3						(Austria) Philipp Oswald	6	3	6
(Austria) Philipp Oswald		6	6		(Austria) Philipp Oswald	3
				8	(Austria) Oliver Marach	0^{r}

==== Fourth qualifier ====
First round				Second round				Qualifying competition
				4	(Japan) Kento Takeuchi	6	6
(India) Mithun Murali	4	6	2		(Thailand) Singekrawee Wattanakul	2	3
(Thailand) Singekrawee Wattanakul	6	3	6					4	(Japan) Kento Takeuchi	7	6
								6	(Japan) Bumpei Sato	5	3
					(Latvia) Deivids Juška	3	2
				6	(Japan) Bumpei Sato	6	6
