= 2015 Malaysian Open – Doubles =

Doubles
- 2015 Malaysian Open

Final
- Champion: (China) Liang Chen (China) Wang Yafan
- Runner-up: (Ukraine) Yuliya Beygelzimer (Ukraine) Olga Savchuk
- Score: 4–6, 6–3, [10–4]

Details
- Draw: 16
- Seeds: 4

Events
Singles	Doubles
← 2014 ·	Malaysian Open	· 2016 →

Tímea Babos and Chan Hao-ching were the defending champions, but Chan chose not to participate this year. Babos chose to play in Monterrey, but lost in the first round.

Liang Chen and Wang Yafan won the title over third seeded Yuliya Beygelzimer and Olga Savchuk with the score, 4–6, 6–3, [10–4].

== Seeds ==
1. (Croatia) Darija Jurak / (Czech Republic) Klára Koukalová (semifinals)
2. (Ukraine) Lyudmyla Kichenok / (Ukraine) Nadiia Kichenok (first round)
3. (Ukraine) Yuliya Beygelzimer / (Ukraine) Olga Savchuk (final)
4. (China) Xu Yifan / (China) Zhang Kailin (first round)

== Draw ==
=== Key ===
- Q = Qualifier
- WC = Wild card
- LL = Lucky loser
- Alt = Alternate
- SE = Special exempt
- PR = Protected ranking
- ITF = ITF entry
- JE = Junior exempt
- w/o = Walkover
- r = Retired
- d = Defaulted
- SR = Special ranking

=== Draw ===
First round
1	(Croatia) D Jurak (Czech Republic) K Koukalová	4	6	[10]
(Belgium) A-S Mestach (United Kingdom) E Webley-Smith	6	3	[1]
(United Kingdom) N Broady (Germany) C Witthöft	6	6
(Argentina) T Búa (Austria) P Mayr-Achleitner	0	2
3	(Ukraine) Y Beygelzimer (Ukraine) O Savchuk	4	6	[10]
(Thailand) P Plipuech (Thailand) Varu Wongteanchai	6	0	[4]
(Poland) M Linette (Poland) K Piter	7	3	[10]
(Uzbekistan) A Amanmuradova (Thailand) T Tanasugarn	5	6	[5]
(Japan) M Eguchi (Georgia (country)) S Shapatava	1	6	[6]
(China) Z Yang (China) L Zhu	6	3	[10]
(Chinese Taipei) K-c Chang (China) S Zheng	6	6
4	(China) Y Xu (China) K Zhang	1	4
WC	(Malaysia) J Noordin (Malaysia) T Selvarajoo	2	0
(China) X Han (Japan) J Namigata	6	6
(China) C Liang (China) Y Wang	6	7^{9}
2	(Ukraine) L Kichenok (Ukraine) N Kichenok	4	6^{7}

Quarterfinals
1	(Croatia) D Jurak (Czech Republic) K Koukalová	7^{7}	6
(United Kingdom) N Broady (Germany) C Witthöft	6^{6}	3
3	(Ukraine) Y Beygelzimer (Ukraine) O Savchuk	6	4	[10]
(Poland) M Linette (Poland) K Piter	3	6	[5]
(China) Z Yang (China) L Zhu	4	4
(Chinese Taipei) K-c Chang (China) S Zheng	6	6
(China) X Han (Japan) J Namigata	6	1	[13]
(China) C Liang (China) Y Wang	4	6	[15]

Semifinals
1	(Croatia) D Jurak (Czech Republic) K Koukalová	1	1
3	(Ukraine) Y Beygelzimer (Ukraine) O Savchuk	6	6
(Chinese Taipei) K-c Chang (China) S Zheng	6^{2}	1
(China) C Liang (China) Y Wang	7^{7}	6

Final
3	(Ukraine) Y Beygelzimer (Ukraine) O Savchuk	6	3	[4]
(China) C Liang (China) Y Wang	4	6	[10]
