= 2014 Malaysian Open, Kuala Lumpur =

- Date: 22–28 September
- Edition: 6th
- Category: World Tour 250
- Draw: 28S / 16D
- Prize money: $910,250
- Surface: Hard
- Location: Kuala Lumpur, Malaysia

Champions

Singles
- (Japan) Kei Nishikori

Doubles
- (Poland) Marcin Matkowski / (India) Leander Paes
- Malaysian Open, Kuala Lumpur

The 2014 Malaysian Open, Kuala Lumpur was a professional tennis tournament played on hard courts. It was the sixth edition of the tournament, and part of the 2014 ATP World Tour. It took place in Kuala Lumpur, Malaysia between 22 and 28 September 2014.

== Singles main-draw entrants ==
=== Seeds ===
Country	Player	Rank*	Seed
JPN	Kei Nishikori	8	1
LAT	Ernests Gulbis	13	2
ARG	Leonardo Mayer	25	3
FRA	Julien Benneteau	29	4
URU	Pablo Cuevas	38	5
POR	João Sousa	39	6
ESP	Pablo Andújar	44	7
AUS	Nick Kyrgios	51	8

- Rankings are as of 15 September 2014

=== Other entrants ===
The following players received wild cards into the singles main draw:

- (Japan) Taro Daniel
- (Australia) Omar Jasika
- (Serbia) Filip Krajinović

The following players received entry from the singles qualifying draw:

- (Austria) Philipp Oswald
- (Germany) Philipp Petzschner
- (Japan) Kento Takeuchi
- (United Kingdom) James Ward

=== Withdrawals ===
Before the tournament

- (South Africa) Kevin Anderson
- (Argentina) Juan Martín del Potro
- (Spain) Marcel Granollers
- (Kazakhstan) Mikhail Kukushkin
- (Canada) Milos Raonic
- (Austria) Dominic Thiem
- (Russia) Dmitry Tursunov

== Doubles main-draw entrants ==
=== Seeds ===
Country	Player	Country	Player	Rank^{1}	Seed
USA	Eric Butorac	RSA	Raven Klaasen	42	1
GBR	Jamie Murray	AUS	John Peers	63	2
GBR	Dominic Inglot	ROU	Florin Mergea	67	3
POL	Marcin Matkowski	IND	Leander Paes	67	4

- Rankings are as of 15 September 2014

=== Other entrants ===
The following pairs received wildcards into the doubles main draw:

- (Australia) Nick Kyrgios / (Malaysia) Syed Mohd Agil Syed Naguib
- (Austria) Jürgen Melzer / (Germany) Philipp Petzschner

=== Withdrawals ===
Before the tournament

- (Croatia) Marin Draganja (back injury)

== Finals ==
=== Singles ===
- (Japan) Kei Nishikori defeated (France) Julien Benneteau, 7–6^{(7–4)}, 6–4

=== Doubles ===
- (Poland) Marcin Matkowski / (India) Leander Paes defeated (United Kingdom) Jamie Murray / (Australia) John Peers, 3–6, 7–6^{(7–5)}, [10–5]
