= 2013 Malaysian Open – Doubles =

Tennis tournament

Doubles
- 2013 Malaysian Open

Final
- Champions: (Japan) Shuko Aoyama (Chinese Taipei) Chang Kai-chen
- Runners-up: (Slovakia) Janette Husárová (China) Zhang Shuai
- Score: 6–7^{(4–7)}, 7–6^{(7–4)}, [14–12]

Details
- Draw: 16
- Seeds: 4

Events
Singles	Doubles
← 2012 ·	Malaysian Open	· 2014 →

Chang Kai-chen and Chuang Chia-jung were the defending champions, but Chuang decided not to participate.
Chang played alongside Shuko Aoyama and successfully defended her title by defeating Janette Husárová and Zhang Shuai in the final, 6–7^{(4–7)}, 7–6^{(7–4)}, [14–12].

== Seeds ==
1. (Slovakia) Janette Husárová / (China) Zhang Shuai (final)
2. (Japan) Shuko Aoyama / (Chinese Taipei) Chang Kai-chen (champions)
3. (Ukraine) Irina Buryachok / (Chinese Taipei) Chan Hao-ching (quarterfinals)
4. (Japan) Rika Fujiwara / (China) Zheng Saisai (quarterfinals)

== Draw ==
=== Key ===
- Q = Qualifier
- WC = Wild card
- LL = Lucky loser
- Alt = Alternate
- SE = Special exempt
- PR = Protected ranking
- ITF = ITF entry
- JE = Junior exempt
- w/o = Walkover
- r = Retired
- d = Defaulted
- SR = Special ranking

=== Draw ===
First round
1	(Slovakia) J Husárová (China) S Zhang	2	6	[10]
(Chinese Taipei) C-w Chan (Thailand) N Lertcheewakarn	6	0	[7]
(Poland) M Domachowska (Poland) A Rosolska	6	6
(Chinese Taipei) S-y Hsieh (Chinese Taipei) S-y Kao	1	1
4	(Japan) R Fujiwara (China) S Zheng	7	3	[10]
WC	(Malaysia) A Chua (China) Z Yang	5	6	[4]
(Thailand) L Kumkhum (Japan) E Sema	6	7^{7}
(Ukraine) L Kichenok (Ukraine) N Kichenok	4	6^{5}
(Czech Republic) Ka Plíšková (Czech Republic) Kr Plíšková	6	6
(Ukraine) Y Beygelzimer (Australia) O Rogowska	3	4
WC	(Malaysia) YS Nabila (Malaysia) T Selvarajoo	1	1
3	(Ukraine) I Buryachok (Chinese Taipei) H-c Chan	6	6
(Australia) M Adamczak (Thailand) V Wongteanchai	3	4
(Uzbekistan) A Amanmuradova (Russia) Ar Rodionova	6	6
(Italy) A Brianti (Slovenia) A Klepač	5	7^{7}	[8]
2	(Japan) S Aoyama (Chinese Taipei) K-c Chang	7	6^{5}	[10]

Quarterfinals
1	(Slovakia) J Husárová (China) S Zhang	6	3	[11]
(Poland) M Domachowska (Poland) A Rosolska	1	6	[9]
4	(Japan) R Fujiwara (China) S Zheng	7	3	[14]
(Thailand) L Kumkhum (Japan) E Sema	5	6	[16]
(Czech Republic) Ka Plíšková (Czech Republic) Kr Plíšková	6	3	[12]
3	(Ukraine) I Buryachok (Chinese Taipei) H-c Chan	3	6	10
(Uzbekistan) A Amanmuradova (Russia) Ar Rodionova	6	6^{4}	[11]
2	(Japan) S Aoyama (Chinese Taipei) K-c Chang	3	7^{7}	[13]

Semifinals
1	(Slovakia) J Husárová (China) S Zhang	4	6	[10]
(Thailand) L Kumkhum (Japan) E Sema	6	3	[5]
(Czech Republic) Ka Plíšková (Czech Republic) Kr Plíšková	2	1
2	(Japan) S Aoyama (Chinese Taipei) K-c Chang	6	6

Final
1	(Slovakia) J Husárová (China) S Zhang	7^{7}	6^{4}	[12]
2	(Japan) S Aoyama (Chinese Taipei) K-c Chang	6^{4}	7^{7}	[14]
