= 2013 Malaysian Open – Singles =

Singles
- 2013 Malaysian Open

Final
- Champion: (Czech Republic) Karolína Plíšková
- Runner-up: (United States) Bethanie Mattek-Sands
- Score: 1–6, 7–5, 6–3

Details
- Draw: 32
- Seeds: 8

Events
Singles	Doubles
- Malaysian Open

Hsieh Su-wei was the defending champion, but she lost in the quarterfinals to Bethanie Mattek-Sands. Karolína Plíšková defeated Mattek-Sands in the final, 1–6, 7–5, 6–3, to claim her first WTA singles title.

== Seeds ==
1. (Denmark) Caroline Wozniacki (first round)
2. (Chinese Taipei) Hsieh Su-wei (quarterfinals)
3. (Russia) Anastasia Pavlyuchenkova (semifinals)
4. (Japan) Ayumi Morita (semifinals)
5. (Japan) Misaki Doi (second round)
6. (Croatia) Donna Vekić (first round)
7. (Greece) Eleni Daniilidou (second round)
8. (Czech Republic) Kristýna Plíšková (first round)

== Draw ==
Key

- Q = Qualifier
- WC = Wild card
- LL = Lucky loser
- Alt = Alternate
- ITF = ITF entry
- PR = Protected ranking
- SR = Special ranking
- SE = Special exempt
- JE = Junior exempt
- JR = Junior Accelerator Programme entrant
- CO = College Accelerator Programme entrant
- NG = Next Gen Accelerator Program entrant
- w/o = Walkover
- r = Retired
- d = Defaulted

=== Finals ===
Semifinals
(Czech Republic) Karolína Plíšková	6	6
4	(Japan) Ayumi Morita	0	2
3/WC	(Russia) Anastasia Pavlyuchenkova	4	1
WC	(United States) Bethanie Mattek-Sands	6	6

Final
(Czech Republic) Karolína Plíšková	1	7	6
WC	(United States) Bethanie Mattek-Sands	6	5	3

=== Top half ===
First round
1	(Denmark) C Wozniacki	6	6^{1}	1
Q	(China) Q Wang	2	7^{7}	6
(Austria) P Mayr-Achleitner	6	6
(France) C Feuerstein	3	4
(Czech Republic) Ka Plíšková	6	6
(Australia) C Dellacqua	3	2
(Italy) A Brianti	2	3
5	(Japan) M Doi	6	6
4	(Japan) A Morita	6	6
(Turkey) Ç Büyükakçay	1	1
Q	(Thailand) N Luangnam	6	6^{1}	6
(China) S Zheng	3	7^{7}	2
(Australia) O Rogowska	6	1	2
Q	(Thailand) L Kumkhum	3	6	6
(Ukraine) Y Beygelzimer	6	4	3
7	(Greece) E Daniilidou	2	6	6

Second round
Q	(China) Q Wang	3	2
(Austria) P Mayr-Achleitner	6	6
(Czech Republic) Ka Plíšková	6	7^{9}
5	(Japan) M Doi	4	6^{7}
4	(Japan) A Morita	6	6
Q	(Thailand) N Luangnam	3	1
Q	(Thailand) L Kumkhum	6	6
7	(Greece) E Daniilidou	2	4

Quarterfinals
(Austria) P Mayr-Achleitner	5	1
(Czech Republic) Ka Plíšková	7	6
4	(Japan) A Morita	6^{7}	6	6
Q	(Thailand) L Kumkhum	7^{9}	4	1

Semifinals
(Czech Republic) Ka Plíšková	6	6
4	(Japan) A Morita	0	2

=== Bottom half ===
First round
8	(Czech Republic) Kr Plíšková	7^{7}	1	5
Q	(Kazakhstan) Z Diyas	6^{5}	6	7
(Australia) A Barty	6	6
Q	(South Africa) C Simmonds	4	2
Q	(Uzbekistan) A Amanmuradova	6	6
(Chinese Taipei) K-c Chang	1	3
(Russia) V Dushevina	6	3	6^{6}
3/WC	(Russia) A Pavlyuchenkova	2	6	7^{8}
6	(Croatia) D Vekić	3	6	2
WC	(United States) B Mattek-Sands	6	4	6
(Russia) M Sirotkina	3	6	6^{12}
(China) Y Duan	6	4	7^{14}
WC	(Malaysia) A Chua	0	1
(China) S Zhang	6	6
(Japan) K Nara	7^{7}	3	4
2	(Chinese Taipei) S-w Hsieh	6^{5}	6	6

Second round
Q	(Kazakhstan) Z Diyas	6^{3}	4
(Australia) A Barty	7^{7}	6
Q	(Uzbekistan) A Amanmuradova	3	3
3/WC	(Russia) A Pavlyuchenkova	6	6
WC	(United States) B Mattek-Sands	6	6
(China) Y Duan	1	4
(China) S Zhang	2	2
2	(Chinese Taipei) S-w Hsieh	6	6

Quarterfinals
(Australia) A Barty	2	0
3/WC	(Russia) A Pavlyuchenkova	6	6
WC	(United States) B Mattek-Sands	7	6
2	(Chinese Taipei) S-w Hsieh	5	2

Semifinals
3/WC	(Russia) A Pavlyuchenkova	4	1
WC	(United States) B Mattek-Sands	6	6

== Qualifying ==
=== Seeds ===
1. (Thailand) Luksika Kumkhum (qualified)
2. (Uzbekistan) Akgul Amanmuradova (qualified)
3. (South Africa) Chanel Simmonds (qualified)
4. (Australia) Monique Adamczak (qualifying competition)
5. (Japan) Erika Sema (qualifying competition)
6. (China) Wang Qiang (qualified)
7. (Ukraine) Lyudmyla Kichenok (first round)
8. (Ukraine) Nadiya Kichenok (qualifying competition)
9. (Thailand) Nudnida Luangnam (qualified)
10. (Russia) Arina Rodionova (qualifying competition)
11. (Japan) Junri Namigata (qualifying competition)
12. (Croatia) Ana Savić (qualifying competition)

=== Qualifiers ===
1. (Thailand) Luksika Kumkhum
2. (Uzbekistan) Akgul Amanmuradova
3. (South Africa) Chanel Simmonds
4. (Thailand) Nudnida Luangnam
5. (Kazakhstan) Zarina Diyas
6. (China) Wang Qiang

=== Draw ===
==== First qualifier ====
First round
1	(Thailand) Luksika Kumkhum	6	6
(China) Yang Zi	3	3
WC	(Chinese Taipei) Chan Hao-ching	2	0
10	(Russia) Arina Rodionova	6	6

Qualifying competition
1	(Thailand) Luksika Kumkhum	6	6
10	(Russia) Arina Rodionova	2	3

==== Second qualifier ====
First round
2	(Uzbekistan) Akgul Amanmuradova	6	6
(Thailand) Varatchaya Wongteanchai	3	3
(Turkey) Pemra Özgen	2	3
12	(Croatia) Ana Savić	6	6

Qualifying competition
2	(Uzbekistan) Akgul Amanmuradova	4	6	7^{13}
12	(Croatia) Ana Savić	6	4	6^{11}

==== Third qualifier ====
First round
3	(South Africa) Chanel Simmonds	6	6
WC	(Malaysia) Theiviya Selvarajoo	1	1
(Japan) Rika Fujiwara	0	0
8	(Ukraine) Nadiya Kichenok	6	6

Qualifying competition
3	(South Africa) Chanel Simmonds	6	3	6
8	(Ukraine) Nadiya Kichenok	3	6	1

==== Fourth qualifier ====
First round
4	(Australia) Monique Adamczak	7^{7}	2	6
(Ukraine) Irina Buryachok	6^{0}	6	4
(Chinese Taipei) Chan Chin-wei	6^{5}	2
9	(Thailand) Nudnida Luangnam	7^{7}	6

Qualifying competition
4	(Australia) Monique Adamczak	7	3	1
9	(Thailand) Nudnida Luangnam	5	6	6

==== Fifth qualifier ====
First round
5	(Japan) Erika Sema	6	6
(Poland) Marta Domachowska	2	4
(Kazakhstan) Zarina Diyas	6	6
7	(Ukraine) Lyudmyla Kichenok	3	2

Qualifying competition
5	(Japan) Erika Sema	3	3
(Kazakhstan) Zarina Diyas	6	6

==== Sixth qualifier ====
First round
6	(China) Wang Qiang	6	6
(Japan) Shuko Aoyama	2	3
(Slovenia) Andreja Klepač	6	4	3
11	(Japan) Junri Namigata	1	6	6

Qualifying competition
6	(China) Wang Qiang	6	6
11	(Japan) Junri Namigata	3	1
