= 2015 Malaysian Open, Kuala Lumpur – Singles =

Singles
- 2015 Malaysian Open, Kuala Lumpur

Final
- Champion: (Spain) David Ferrer
- Runner-up: (Spain) Feliciano López
- Score: 7–5, 7–5

Details
- Draw: 28
- Seeds: 8

Events
| Singles | Doubles |
| ← 2014 · | Malaysian Open, Kuala Lumpur |

Kei Nishikori was the defending champion but chose not to participate this year. Three-time losing finalist Julien Benneteau did not participate either.

David Ferrer won the title, defeating Feliciano López in the final 7–5, 7–5.

== Seeds ==
The top four seeds received a bye into the second round.

1. (Spain) David Ferrer (champion)
2. (Spain) Feliciano López (final)
3. (Croatia) Ivo Karlović (quarterfinals)
4. (Bulgaria) Grigor Dimitrov (quarterfinals)
5. (Serbia) Viktor Troicki (first round)
6. (France) Jérémy Chardy (second round)
7. (Australia) Nick Kyrgios (semifinals)
8. (Canada) Vasek Pospisil (quarterfinals)

== Draw ==
=== Key ===
- Q = Qualifier
- WC = Wild card
- LL = Lucky loser
- Alt = Alternate
- SE = Special exempt
- PR = Protected ranking
- ITF = ITF entry
- JE = Junior exempt
- w/o = Walkover
- r = Retired
- d = Defaulted
- SR = Special ranking

=== Finals ===
Semifinals
1 | (Spain) David Ferrer | 3 | 6 | 6
(Germany) Benjamin Becker | 6 | 2 | 4
7 | (Australia) Nick Kyrgios | 6^{2} | 6^{5}
2 | (Spain) Feliciano López | 7^{7} | 7^{7}

Final
1 | (Spain) David Ferrer | 7 | 7
2 | (Spain) Feliciano López | 5 | 5

=== Top half ===
First round
PR | (Czech Republic) R Štěpánek | 7^{8} | 6
Q | (Japan) Y Sugita | 6^{6} | 0
WC | (India) R Ramanathan | 2 | 2
(Kazakhstan) M Kukushkin | 6 | 6
(Moldova) R Albot | 6 | 7^{7}
5 | (Serbia) V Troicki | 2 | 6^{5}
(Portugal) J Sousa | 6 | 6
Q | (Poland) M Przysiężny | 2 | 2
(Australia) S Groth | 1 | 6^{6}
(Germany) B Becker | 6 | 7^{8}
(Germany) A Zverev | 6 | 3 | 2
6 | (France) J Chardy | 3 | 6 | 6

Second round
1 | (Spain) D Ferrer | 7 | 6
PR | (Czech Republic) R Štěpánek | 5 | 3
(Kazakhstan) M Kukushkin | 6 | 6
(Moldova) R Albot | 3 | 2
4 | (Bulgaria) G Dimitrov | 2 | 6 | 6
(Portugal) J Sousa | 6 | 3 | 4
(Germany) B Becker | 5 | 6 | 7
6 | (France) J Chardy | 7 | 1 | 5

Quarterfinals
1 | (Spain) D Ferrer | 6 | 6
(Kazakhstan) M Kukushkin | 3 | 4
4 | (Bulgaria) G Dimitrov | 4 | 6^{3}
(Germany) B Becker | 6 | 7^{7}

Semifinals
1 | (Spain) D Ferrer | 3 | 6 | 6
(Germany) B Becker | 6 | 2 | 4

=== Bottom half ===
First round
7 | (Australia) N Kyrgios | 6 | 2
(Colombia) S Giraldo | 1 | 1^{r}
(Japan) T Ito | 6 | 7^{7}
(Finland) J Nieminen | 2 | 6^{3}
(Georgia (country)) N Basilashvili | 6 | 1
(Kazakhstan) A Nedovyesov | 3 | 0^{r}
8 | (Canada) V Pospisil | 6 | 6
Q | (Japan) Y Uchiyama | 3 | 4
WC | (Spain) N Almagro | 3 | 7^{7} | 1
(Cyprus) M Baghdatis | 6 | 6^{5} | 6
Q | (Germany) M Zverev | 7^{7} | 3 | 6
(United States) R Ram | 6^{2} | 6 | 3

Second round
7 | (Australia) N Kyrgios | 6 | 6
(Japan) T Ito | 3 | 2
(Georgia (country)) N Basilashvili | 5 | 6 | 3
3/WC | (Croatia) I Karlović | 7 | 4 | 6
8 | (Canada) V Pospisil | 7^{7} | 3 | 6
(Cyprus) M Baghdatis | 6^{2} | 6 | 3
Q | (Germany) M Zverev | 3 | 6^{4}
2 | (Spain) F López | 6 | 7^{7}

Quarterfinals
7 | (Australia) N Kyrgios | 7^{7} | 7^{7}
3/WC | (Croatia) I Karlović | 6^{4} | 6^{2}
8 | (Canada) V Pospisil | 7^{7} | 3 | 2
2 | (Spain) F López | 6^{2} | 6 | 6

Semifinals
7 | (Australia) N Kyrgios | 6^{2} | 6^{5}
2 | (Spain) F López | 7^{7} | 7^{7}

== Qualifying ==
=== Seeds ===
1. (Japan) Yūichi Sugita (qualified)
2. (Italy) Luca Vanni (qualifying competition)
3. (Japan) Yoshihito Nishioka (first round)
4. (Poland) Michał Przysiężny (qualified)
5. (Italy) Matteo Donati (qualifying competition)
6. (Italy) Thomas Fabbiano (second round)
7. (Japan) Yasutaka Uchiyama (qualified)
8. (United States) Daniel Nguyen (qualifying competition)

=== Qualifiers ===
1. (Japan) Yūichi Sugita
2. (Japan) Yasutaka Uchiyama
3. (Germany) Mischa Zverev
4. (Poland) Michał Przysiężny

=== Qualifying draw ===
==== First qualifier ====
First round
1 | (Japan) Yūichi Sugita | 6 | 6
(Thailand) Congsup Congcar | 2 | 2
(Germany) Andre Begemann | 2 | 6 | 6
(Japan) Shuichi Sekiguchi | 6 | 2 | 3
(Australia) Edward Bourchier | 3 | 3
(Australia) Harry Bourchier | 6 | 6
(Argentina) Matias Castro | 2 | 2
5 | (Italy) Matteo Donati | 6 | 6

Second round
1 | (Japan) Yūichi Sugita | 6 | 6
(Germany) Andre Begemann | 2 | 1
(Australia) Harry Bourchier | 2 | 2
5 | (Italy) Matteo Donati | 6 | 6

Qualifying competition
1 | (Japan) Yūichi Sugita | 6 | 7^{7}
5 | (Italy) Matteo Donati | 4 | 6^{2}

==== Second qualifier ====
First round
2 | (Italy) Luca Vanni | 6 | 7^{7}
WC | (Malaysia) Syed Mohd Agil Syed Naguib | 4 | 6^{3}
(Singapore) Roy Hobbs | 5 | 3
(Mexico) Santiago González | 7 | 6
(Canada) Kelsey Stevenson | 6 | 3 | 2
(Japan) Takao Suzuki | 2 | 6 | 6
WC | (Malaysia) Christian Oliver Lee | 1 | 2
7 | (Japan) Yasutaka Uchiyama | 6 | 6

Second round
2 | (Italy) Luca Vanni | 6 | 6
(Mexico) Santiago González | 4 | 3
(Japan) Takao Suzuki | 2 | 2
7 | (Japan) Yasutaka Uchiyama | 6 | 6

Qualifying competition
2 | (Italy) Luca Vanni | 6 | 6^{5} | 5
7 | (Japan) Yasutaka Uchiyama | 3 | 7^{7} | 7

==== Third qualifier ====
First round
3 | (Japan) Yoshihito Nishioka | 5 | 2
(Germany) Philipp Petzschner | 7 | 6
(Germany) Mischa Zverev | 6 | 6
(South Korea) Jun Woong-sun | 4 | 2
(France) Jonathan Eysseric | 4 | 4
(New Zealand) Artem Sitak | 6 | 6
(South Korea) Kim Cheong-eui | 2 | 2
6 | (Italy) Thomas Fabbiano | 6 | 6

Second round
(Germany) Philipp Petzschner | 6^{6} | 4
(Germany) Mischa Zverev | 7^{8} | 6
(New Zealand) Artem Sitak | 3 | 6 | 6
6 | (Italy) Thomas Fabbiano | 6 | 4 | 3

Qualifying competition
(Germany) Mischa Zverev | 6 | 7^{7}
(New Zealand) Artem Sitak | 4 | 6^{5}

==== Fourth qualifier ====
First round
4 | (Poland) Michał Przysiężny | 6 | 7^{7}
(Indonesia) Christopher Rungkat | 4 | 6^{2}
PR | (Australia) Zach Itzstein | 5 | 3
WC | (Malaysia) Ahmed Deedat Abdul Razak | 7 | 6
(Russia) Ilya Vasilyev | 6^{0} | 6 | 6
WC | (Malaysia) Muhammad-Ashaari Bin Zainal-Abidin | 7^{7} | 4 | 4
PR | (United States) Austin Karosi | 3 | 2
8 | (United States) Daniel Nguyen | 6 | 6

Second round
4 | (Poland) Michał Przysiężny | 6 | 6
WC | (Malaysia) Ahmed Deedat Abdul Razak | 1 | 1
(Russia) Ilya Vasilyev | 0 | 3
8 | (United States) Daniel Nguyen | 6 | 6

Qualifying competition
4 | (Poland) Michał Przysiężny | 6 | 6
8 | (United States) Daniel Nguyen | 0 | 1
