= 2014 Malaysian Open – Singles =

Women's tennis tournament

Singles
- 2014 Malaysian Open

Final
- Champion: (Croatia) Donna Vekić
- Runner-up: (Slovakia) Dominika Cibulková
- Score: 5–7, 7–5, 7–6^{(7–4)}

Details
- Draw: 32
- Seeds: 8

Events
Singles	Doubles
- Malaysian Open

Karolína Plíšková was the defending champion, but lost in the semifinals to Dominika Cibulková.

Donna Vekić won her first WTA title, defeating Cibulková in the final, 5–7, 7–5, 7–6^{(7–4)}.

== Seeds ==
1. (Slovakia) Dominika Cibulková (final)
2. (China) Zhang Shuai (semifinals)
3. (Czech Republic) Karolína Plíšková (semifinals)
4. (Austria) Patricia Mayr-Achleitner (quarterfinals)
5. (Japan) Kimiko Date-Krumm (first round, retired)
6. (Kazakhstan) Zarina Diyas (quarterfinals)
7. (Croatia) Donna Vekić (champion)
8. (Japan) Ayumi Morita (first round)

== Draw ==
Key

- Q = Qualifier
- WC = Wild card
- LL = Lucky loser
- Alt = Alternate
- ITF = ITF entry
- PR = Protected ranking
- SR = Special ranking
- SE = Special exempt
- JE = Junior exempt
- JR = Junior Accelerator Programme entrant
- CO = College Accelerator Programme entrant
- NG = Next Gen Accelerator Program entrant
- w/o = Walkover
- r = Retired
- d = Defaulted

=== Finals ===
Semifinals
1	(Slovakia) Dominika Cibulková	6^{3}	6	6
3	(Czech Republic) Karolína Plíšková	7^{7}	3	3
7	(Croatia) Donna Vekić	1	6	6
2	(China) Zhang Shuai	6	3	4

Final
1	(Slovakia) Dominika Cibulková	7	5	6^{4}
7	(Croatia) Donna Vekić	5	7	7^{7}

=== Top half ===
First round
1	(Slovakia) D Cibulková	6	6
Q	(Turkey) P Özgen	1	3
(Chinese Taipei) S-w Hsieh	2	6	6
WC	(Australia) J Gajdošová	6	4	3
(Tunisia) O Jabeur	6	4	2
Q	(Italy) G Gatto-Monticone	3	6	6
WC	(Greece) E Daniilidou	2	2
6	(Kazakhstan) Z Diyas	6	6
3	(Czech Republic) Ka Plíšková	6	6
(Serbia) A Krunić	2	2
Q	(China) Y Duan	6	6
Q	(Croatia) A Vrljić	3	2
(Slovenia) T Majerič	4	6	6
(Uzbekistan) A Amanmuradova	6	2	0
(Turkey) Ç Büyükakçay	5
5	(Japan) K Date-Krumm	3^{r}

Second round
1	(Slovakia) D Cibulková	6	6
(Chinese Taipei) S-w Hsieh	1	2
Q	(Italy) G Gatto-Monticone	1	4
6	(Kazakhstan) Z Diyas	6	6
3	(Czech Republic) Ka Plíšková	6	6
Q	(China) Y Duan	1	3
(Slovenia) T Majerič	4	4
(Turkey) Ç Büyükakçay	6	6

Quarterfinals
1	(Slovakia) D Cibulková	4	6	6
6	(Kazakhstan) Z Diyas	6	2	4
3	(Czech Republic) Ka Plíšková	6	6
(Turkey) Ç Büyükakçay	4	4

Semifinals
1	(Slovakia) D Cibulková	6^{3}	6	6
3	(Czech Republic) Ka Plíšková	7^{7}	3	3

=== Bottom half ===
First round
7	(Croatia) D Vekić	3	6	6
(Chinese Taipei) Y-j Chan	6	4	1
(Hungary) T Babos	6^{6}	6	4
(Czech Republic) Kr Plíšková	7^{8}	3	6
(Montenegro) D Kovinić	6	6
(Belgium) A-S Mestach	4	2
Q	(Japan) E Hozumi	4	6	3
4	(Austria) P Mayr-Achleitner	6	2	6
8	(Japan) A Morita	4	2
Q	(Ukraine) L Kichenok	6	6
(Poland) M Linette	6	6
(France) A Lim	3	0
WC	(Hong Kong) L Zhang	6	6
(Ukraine) O Savchuk	3	2
(China) S Zheng	6	2	2
2	(China) S Zhang	2	6	6

Second round
7	(Croatia) D Vekić	1	6	7
(Czech Republic) Kr Plíšková	6	3	5
(Montenegro) D Kovinić	4	6	1
4	(Austria) P Mayr-Achleitner	6	3	6
Q	(Ukraine) L Kichenok	1	2
(Poland) M Linette	6	6
WC	(Hong Kong) L Zhang	3	6	0
2	(China) S Zhang	6	4	6

Quarterfinals
7	(Croatia) D Vekić	6	7
4	(Austria) P Mayr-Achleitner	4	5
(Poland) M Linette	2	6	1
2	(China) S Zhang	6	2	6

Semifinals
7	(Croatia) D Vekić	1	6	6
2	(China) S Zhang	6	3	4

== Qualifying ==
=== Seeds ===
1. (Japan) Eri Hozumi (qualified)
2. (Japan) Erika Sema (qualifying competition)
3. (China) Duan Yingying (qualified)
4. (Ukraine) Lyudmyla Kichenok (qualified)
5. (Turkey) Pemra Özgen (qualified)
6. (Croatia) Ana Vrljić (qualified)
7. (Japan) Yurika Sema (first round)
8. (United Kingdom) Samantha Murray (first round)
9. (China) Wang Qiang (qualifying competition)
10. (Italy) Giulia Gatto-Monticone (qualified)
11. (Australia) Arina Rodionova (qualifying competition)
12. (Japan) Miharu Imanishi (qualifying competition)

=== Qualifiers ===
1. (Japan) Eri Hozumi
2. (Italy) Giulia Gatto-Monticone
3. (China) Duan Yingying
4. (Ukraine) Lyudmyla Kichenok
5. (Turkey) Pemra Özgen
6. (Croatia) Ana Vrljić

=== Qualifying draw ===
==== First qualifier ====
First round
1	(Japan) Eri Hozumi	6	6
(Chinese Taipei) Chan Chin-wei	3	1
(Japan) Rika Fujiwara	6	3	7
8	(United Kingdom) Samantha Murray	4	6	5

Qualifying competition
1	(Japan) Eri Hozumi	6	1	7
(Japan) Rika Fujiwara	1	6	5

==== Second qualifier ====
First round
2	(Japan) Erika Sema	6	6
WC	(Chinese Taipei) Chan Hao-Ching	1	3
(China) Xu Yifan	4	3
10	(Italy) Giulia Gatto-Monticone	6	6

Qualifying competition
2	(Japan) Erika Sema	3	6	3
10	(Italy) Giulia Gatto-Monticone	6	2	6

==== Third qualifier ====
First round
3	(China) Duan Yingying	6	6
(Thailand) Peangtarn Plipuech	1	3
(Thailand) Nicha Lertpitaksinchai	2	6	1
12	(Japan) Miharu Imanishi	6	4	6

Qualifying competition
3	(China) Duan Yingying	6	6
12	(Japan) Miharu Imanishi	0	1

==== Fourth qualifier ====
First round
4	(Ukraine) Lyudmyla Kichenok	6	7
(China) Liu Fangzhou	2	5
(China) Yang Zi	3	4
9	(China) Wang Qiang	6	6

Qualifying competition
4	(Ukraine) Lyudmyla Kichenok	6	6
9	(China) Wang Qiang	2	2

==== Fifth qualifier ====
First round
5	(Turkey) Pemra Özgen	6	6
WC	(Chinese Taipei) Hsieh Shu-ying	0	2
WC	(Japan) Miki Miyamura	6	3	6
7	(Japan) Yurika Sema	3	6	3

Qualifying competition
5	(Turkey) Pemra Özgen	6	7
WC	(Japan) Miki Miyamura	0	5

==== Sixth qualifier ====
First round
6	(Croatia) Ana Vrljić	7	6
(Poland) Sandra Zaniewska	5	4
WC	(Malaysia) Alyssa Boey	1	1
11	(Australia) Arina Rodionova	6	6

Qualifying competition
6	(Croatia) Ana Vrljić	6	6^{6}	6
11	(Australia) Arina Rodionova	3	7^{8}	0
