= 2014 Malaysian Open – Doubles =

Doubles
- 2014 Malaysian Open

Final
- Champions: (Hungary) Tímea Babos (Chinese Taipei) Chan Hao-ching
- Runners-up: (Chinese Taipei) Chan Yung-jan (China) Zheng Saisai
- Score: 6–3, 6–4

Details
- Draw: 16
- Seeds: 4

Events
Singles	Doubles
← 2013 ·	Malaysian Open	· 2015 →

Shuko Aoyama and Chang Kai-chen were the defending champions, but decided not to participate this year.

Tímea Babos and Chan Hao-ching won the title, defeating Chan Yung-jan and Zheng Saisai in the final, 6–3, 6–4.

== Seeds ==
1. (Hungary) Tímea Babos / (Chinese Taipei) Chan Hao-ching (champions)
2. (Croatia) Darija Jurak / (United States) Megan Moulton-Levy (quarterfinals)
3. (Australia) Jarmila Gajdošová / (Chinese Taipei) Hsieh Su-wei (semifinals)
4. (Chinese Taipei) Chan Yung-jan / (China) Zheng Saisai (final)

== Draw ==
=== Key ===
- Q = Qualifier
- WC = Wild card
- LL = Lucky loser
- Alt = Alternate
- SE = Special exempt
- PR = Protected ranking
- ITF = ITF entry
- JE = Junior exempt
- w/o = Walkover
- r = Retired
- d = Defaulted
- SR = Special ranking

=== Draw ===
First round
1	(Hungary) T Babos (Chinese Taipei) H-c Chan	4	6	[13]
(Serbia) A Krunić (Croatia) A Vrljić	6	0	[11]
WC	(Malaysia) A Boey (China) Z Yang	0	0
(Greece) E Daniilidou (Poland) M Linette	6	6
3	(Australia) J Gajdošová (Chinese Taipei) S-w Hsieh	6	6
(Chinese Taipei) C-j Chuang (Japan) R Fujiwara	3	4
(Chinese Taipei) C-w Chan (China) Y Xu	6	5	[10]
(Japan) E Sema (Japan) Y Sema	3	7	[8]
Alt	(Chinese Taipei) S-y Hsieh (Australia) A Rodionova	6^{0}	6	[10]
(Japan) E Hozumi (Japan) M Miyamura	7^{7}	2	[3]
WC	(Turkey) Ç Büyükakçay (Turkey) P Özgen	0	1
4	(Chinese Taipei) Y-j Chan (China) S Zheng	6	6
(Czech Republic) Ka Plíšková (Czech Republic) Kr Plíšková	4	6	[8]
(Ukraine) L Kichenok (Ukraine) O Savchuk	6	4	[10]
(Thailand) N Lertpitaksinchai (Thailand) P Plipuech	0	4
2	(Croatia) D Jurak (United States) M Moulton-Levy	6	6

Quarterfinals
1	(Hungary) T Babos (Chinese Taipei) H-c Chan	7^{7}	6
(Greece) E Daniilidou (Poland) M Linette	6^{5}	2
3	(Australia) J Gajdošová (Chinese Taipei) S-w Hsieh	6	6
(Chinese Taipei) C-w Chan (China) Y Xu	3	3
Alt	(Chinese Taipei) S-y Hsieh (Australia) A Rodionova	0	1
4	(Chinese Taipei) Y-j Chan (China) S Zheng	6	6
(Ukraine) L Kichenok (Ukraine) O Savchuk	6	5	[10]
2	(Croatia) D Jurak (United States) M Moulton-Levy	3	7	[5]

Semifinals
1	(Hungary) T Babos (Chinese Taipei) H-c Chan	6	6
3	(Australia) J Gajdošová (Chinese Taipei) S-w Hsieh	3	3
4	(Chinese Taipei) Y-j Chan (China) S Zheng	4	6	[10]
(Ukraine) L Kichenok (Ukraine) O Savchuk	6	4	[4]

Final
1	(Hungary) T Babos (Chinese Taipei) H-c Chan	6	6
4	(Chinese Taipei) Y-j Chan (China) S Zheng	3	4
