= Royal Selangor Golf Club =

Golf club in Kuala Lumpur, Malaysia

Coordinates: 3.14539°N 101.7261°E

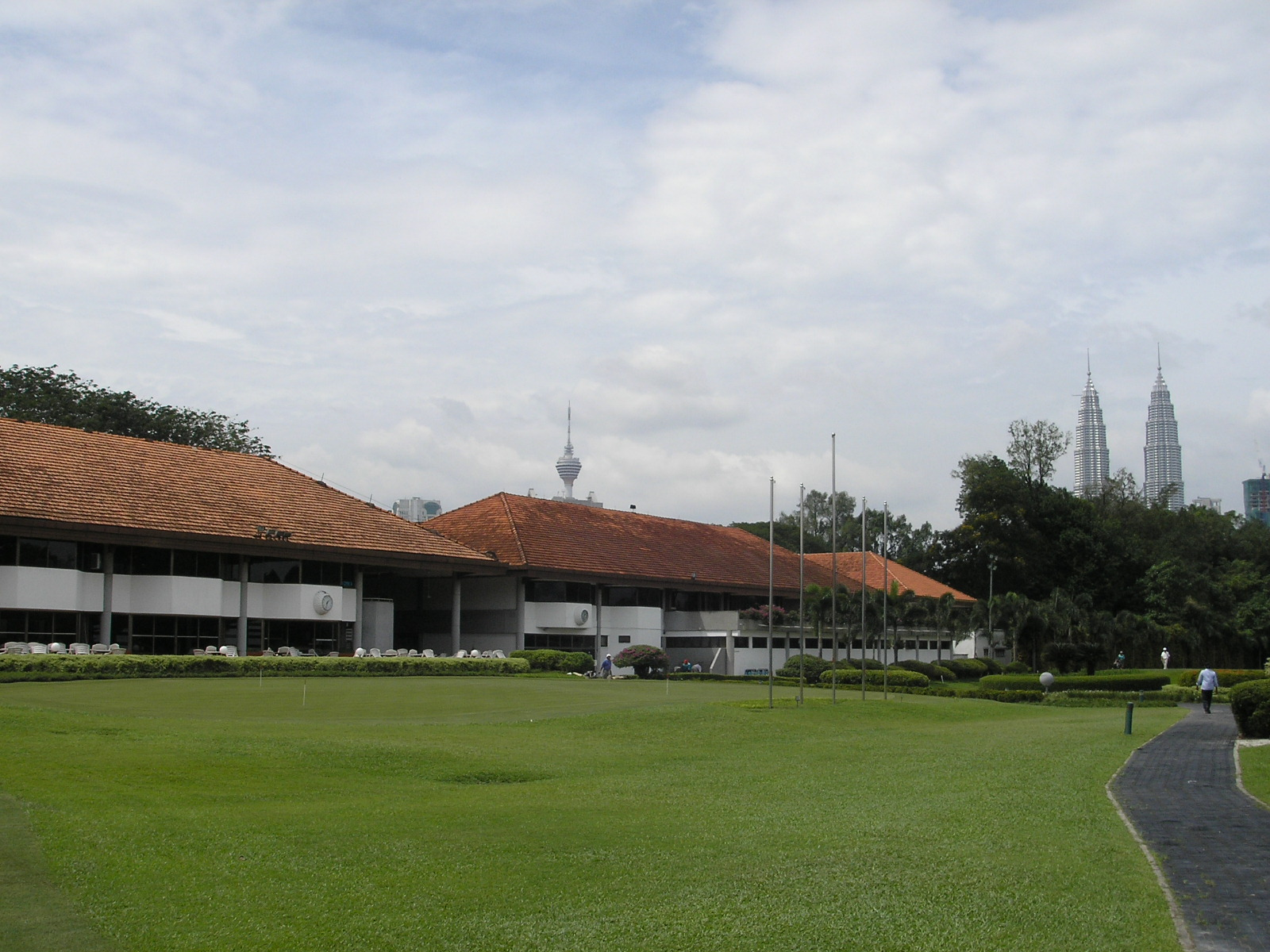
The Royal Selangor Golf Club

The Royal Selangor Golf Club (Malay: Kelab Golf di Raja Selangor) is a golf course in Kuala Lumpur, Malaysia. Established in 1893, it is one of the oldest golf clubs in Asia. The club is a private membership club and is open only to members. Its entrance is located at the intersection of Jalan Raja Chulan and Jalan Tun Razak, the latter of which runs along the length of the club. It has two 18-hole championship courses, the Old Course and the New Course, and a 9-hole course, which is known as the Sulaiman Course. It also has a 25-meter swimming pool and complexes for badminton, pickleball and tennis.

== History ==
=== Early plans ===
It all began when several coffee planters thought that it was a jolly good idea for Kuala Lumpur to have a golf club. On Friday 13 January 1893, they called for a meeting through a notice in the Selangor Journal (the publication which served as a sort of newspaper as well as an official bulletin).

“A meeting will be held at the Selangor Club on Saturday, the 21st inst., at 6.00 pm to consider the advisability of forming a Golf Club in Kuala Lumpur. All interested are invited to attend”. This brief notice constitutes, for all practical purposes, the birth notice of the Selangor Golf Club.

The proposed meeting was duly held, and a provisional committee appointed “to drawn up a scheme for the formation of a golf club”. The founder members were among them the Glassford brothers, Clam and John and Kit and Robert Meikle. Back in 1893, Kuala Lumpur was just a little more than a straggling township surrounded by jungle. Even in 1893, however, the game of golf was not new to Kuala Lumpur.

A 5-hole course has been laid out in the town’s public gardens – the Lake Gardens, but no Club had been formed yet. One of the first decisions the provisional committee had to make was whether to take over the Lake Garden Course or to break entirely new ground by laying out a new course on 80 acres of hilly land known as Petaling Street consisting of the area where the Victoria Institution, the Methodist Boys School, Stadium Merdeka and Stadium Negara now stand.

A major drawback of Petaling Hill was that it contained a disused graveyard whilst the chief argument against the Lake Gardens was that it was a place open to the public and tenure would be temporary. So Petaling Hill, with its grave and all, was chosen for its permanence, or so it was thought in 1893.

The Glassford brothers together with A.T.D. Berrington, the Chief Magistrate of Selangor undertook the task of laying out the course. They estimated the expenses of ” preparing the links and getting them in order for year at $300″. Their work was completed in a few months and the course was opened for play on 21 August 1893. The Club had 30 founder members; entrance fee was $5 and monthly subscription 50 cents. The first Clubhouse was completed towards the end of 1894.

Surviving records show that a prize was offered for a ladies’ handicap even in 1896. This is the first known reference to women’s golf in Kuala Lumpur.

=== New site of the club ===
In 1918, the State Government confirmed a rumour that it intended to reclaim Petaling Hill for a public park. The club members then numbered 250 appointed a committee to negotiate with the Government.

In return for Petaling Hill, the Government agreed to provide the Club with an alternative site, put up the money necessary for the construction of a new clubhouse and provide an area sufficient for and an additional 18-holes as “compensation for disturbance”. The new site is where RSGC has remained till this day .

Part of the new site was occupied by the Forestry Department for tree planting research and part by mining concerns. The miners were persuaded to leave by the influential Choo Kia Peng, a respected member since 1909, in return for monetary compensation.

The Foresty Department on being approached, indicated that their experiments had served their purpose and had no objections to leaving. The beautiful Tembusu trees and some of the pond holes which are still around are legacies from the Club’s previous tenants.

Work started on the new site in 1920. By October 1921, the first nine holes (Second Nine, Old Course) and the clubhouse were ready. In the same year, the Club was converted to a limited liability company. The memorandum of Association was established on 28 June 1921

The second nine holes (First Nine, Old Course) and eight tennis courts were opened the following year and a third nine (First Nine, New Course) was brought into play in 1924. The fourth nine (Second Nine, New Course ) was completed in 1931. A swimming pool was added in 1937 despite protests that “this is a golf club”. The Club continued to prosper thereafter into the region’s leading golfing facility.

=== Wartime disruption ===
Then came the Second World War in 1942. All golfing activity ceased. The Clubhouse was used as an arms school by the Japanese Occupation Forces. The courses became tapioca, bananas and vegetable patches. An airstrip and barracks were built on the course for military use. Squatters also moved in with hundreds of cattle.

=== Post-war development ===
Gradually, old members began to return to the club while new ones were admitted. Competitions were revived. Membership which stood at 975 in 1948 had increased to an astonishing 1,799 in 1953.

The Swimming Pool Pavilion was built in 1953. Records show that it was a Frank Lloyd's design and today it is a classified Heritage Building.

In August 21 1953, the club celebrated its Diamond Jubilee Year for attaining its 60 years of existence.

In the mid-1950s and after Malaya achieved independence in 1957, interest in golf among Asians was fuelled by the country's first Prime Minister, Tunku Abdul Rahman Putra Al Haj. Being a keen golfer, he encouraged many Asians to join the club and take up the game.

The 1960s became an important decade in the club's history, with the birth in 1961 of the Putra Cup, a golf trophy donated by the Prime Minister for a Southeast Asian Amateur Golf Team Championship.

In 1962, the club hosted the first Malaysia Open and consecutively every year throughout this decade. Since this inaugural Open, the Club became home for both these events for several years, until other countries began to host the Putra Cup and other clubs in Malaysia took over hosting of the Malaysian Open.

In 1963 the club received its ‘Royal' designation from His Majesty the Yang Di Pertuan Agong, the DYMM Tunku Syed Putra Ibni Al-Marhum Syed Hasan Jamallulail, the Raja of Perlis Indera Kayangan. With the conferement of the ‘Royal' title, the club was renamed the Royal Selangor Golf Club, which marked a new chapter in its history.

Since then, the club has become Malaysia's premier golf club and most exclusive. Interest in golf grew among the upper strata of the local population and was reflected in the club's membership. To meet burgeoning membership, parts of the club were extended.

In 1965, a group of members who had been members of the defunct Sulaiman Club in Cheras brought with them the net assets of that club and donated them to the RSGC for the construction of the 9-hole Sulaiman Course, and this course has become more of a beginner's course.

In 1968, the club's crest came into existence.

Since the club never really had a proper restaurant, an additional storey above the rotunda was built in 1974 and the restaurant was called The Fairway.

For the first time in 1977, the club staged the Nomura Cup, Asia's Amateur Golf Team Championship.

With increasing membership, further extensions were required. In 1978, two new blocks costing RM3 million were built, with a multi-purpose hall dining rooms, a mixed bar, a men's bar, men's and ladies' changing rooms, a sauna, squash courts, and hairdressing salons for men and ladies. The new clubhouse was officially opened on 25 March 1979.

The switch from serangoon to tifdwarf grass on the New Course tees and greens was carried out in 1981, with all the greens re-sculptured.

To fulfill member's demands, a new floor above the men's bar and men's changing rooms was added in 1988, with a reading room, conference room, a new multi-purpose hall, a surau, a gymnasium and a viewing gallery. Since the mixed bar had never been too well patronised, it was converted to a western restaurant known as The Green. The opening of this section of the clubhouse was officiated by Duli Yang Maha Mulia Seri Paduka Baginda Sultan Iskandaar, Yang DiPertuan Agong on 18 March 1989.

The Old Course greens were given a face-lift and were also converted from serangoon to tifdwarf grass. Work started and was completed on the second nine in 1991, with alterations made on some holes. In 1992, the greens on the first nine underwent the same transformation.

Another professional golf championship which made its debut in 1992 at the RSGC was the Fairway Masters, which has since been renamed the Dunhill Malaysian Masters. This Masters was televised live.

In 1993, the RSGC reached a mammoth milestone in its history. On 21 October, the club attained its 100th year birthday. A celebration and a series of events which filled the calendar were held to commemorate this achievement. The Centenary Year closed on 31 December 1993 with the sealing of a time capsule.

In 1998, the club adopted a stand to become a good corporate citizen and did its bit for charity by holding a charity golf competition and staging a musical concert in cooperation with the Kuala Lumpur Operafest Children Choir to raise funds for the poor and needy.

In October 1999, the renovation of the Suleiman Course was completed. Originally consisting of par 3s only, this short course now has three par 4s and six par 3s.

The clubhouse's extension and renovation plan was approved in 1998 to build a new two-storey administration block adjacent to the clubhouse at cost of RM7.5 million. Work commenced at the end of 1999, and the new building was completed by August 2001. On 10 September 2001, the management staff moved into the new building.

The club hosted the 2001 Davidoff Nations Cup from 27 to 30 September 2001, the sole qualifying event for the EMC World Club.

Year 2002 saw the Malaysian Open Tournament returned to the grounds of the RSGC after it was last held here in 1994. The tournament was held from 28 February to 3 March.

In 2006, the club had a multi-million ringgit renovation and upgrading.

Information sourced from the official RSGC website

== Tournaments ==
The Malaysian Open was held at Royal Selangor almost every year from its inauguration in 1962 through to 1986. The tournament returned in 1993 and 1994, and again in 2002, when it was part of both the European Tour and Asian Tour. The tours revisited in 2016, with the inaugural Maybank Championship Malaysia.

In 1978, the club hosted the LPGA Tour's Colgate Far East Open. Between 1988 and 1992, the Malaysian Masters, which was an Australasian Tour event for its final two years, was played at Royal Selangor.

In 1961, the first edition of the Putra Cup was held at the golf club. This was the first international tournament hosted in the state of Selangor. Teams from Burma, Hong Kong, Indonesia, Malaysia, Singapore, Thailand and Vietnam participated in the tournament. In 2006, the club held a royal competition that was hosted by the 12th Yang di-Pertuan Agong, HM Tuanku Syed Sirajuddin, 7th Raja of Perlis.

== See also ==
- List of golf clubs granted Royal status
- List of golf clubs in Malaysia
