= Malaysian Open (tennis) =

Defunct tennis tournament
- Event name: Malayan Championships (1921–1963); Malaysian Open Tennis Championship (1964–1978); Malaysian Tennis Classic (1992–1993); Malaysian Salem Open (1993-1995); Malaysian Open (2009–2017)
- Founded: 1921; 105 years ago
- Abolished: 2017; 9 years ago
- Location: Ipoh; Petaling Jaya; Penang; Singapore; Kuala Lumpur
- Venue: Bukit Kiara Equestrian & Country Resort (2010–2012); RSGC (since 2013)
- Surface: Carpet – indoors Clay – outdoors Hard – outdoors

The Malaysian Open was a combined men's and women's professional tennis tournament played on outdoor hard courts that was originally founded the Malayan Championships. The event has been held at the Bukit Kiara Equestrian & Country Resort and The Royal Selangor Golf Club. The tournament ran from 1921 to 1978. It was revived for a second time from 1992 through to 1995. It was staged for the third and final time from 2009 to 2018.

== History ==
The first edition of the Malayan Championships was played in 1921 in Singapore. Women participated for the first time in 1925. In 1942 the event was suspended due to World War II and it resumed in 1948. On 16 September 1963 the country changed its name, from Malaya to Malaysia and the tournament became the Malaysian Open in 1964 (though only open to amateurs until 1969).

In 1992 the women's tournament was reestablished as the Malaysian Tennis Classic. It was competed on indoor hard courts in Kuala Lumpur. The tournament was part of the Women's Tennis Association (WTA) Tour, and was designated as a Tier IV event. Winners received $18,000. In both years it was held from 19 April to 26 April. The event was discontinued from 1993 onwards. In 1993 the men's tournament was revived as the Kuala Lumpur Open (aka Malaysia Salem Open) which ran until 1995. The men's event was played on hard courts in 1993 and on indoor carpet courts from 1994 to 1995. It was an event on the ATP World Series, replacing the Singapore Open for this period. Four Malaysian Players (V. Selvam, Mon S Sudesh, Martin. A and A. Lourdesamy) were banned for participating in the Bridgestone Open that was simultaneous with the Kuala Lumpur Open, as the Bridgestone Tournament wasn't sanctioned by the LTAM. Selvam's banned was lifted after two years by the LTAM.

In 2009 the men's tournament was revived as the Proton Malaysian Open that ran until 2015 as an ATP World Tour 250 fixture. In 2016 the men's event was replaced on the ATP tour by the Chengdu Open. In 2010 the women's tournament was revived for the second time. Initially, the organisers operated with a license directly from WTA. However, later on they cut a deal for a lease of WTA Palermo's license in late-2013.

In 2017, the Women's Tennis Association deleted reference to Israeli player Julia Glushko's nationality and Israel's flag from Glushko's profile on their website ahead of her scheduled participation at the Malaysian Open, when event organizers requested all references to her being Israeli be removed from the WTA website in order for her to be allowed to take part in the event. The WTA subsequently reinstated them.

The last men's Malaysian Open was held in 2015 and the women's in 2017, after which, WTA Palermo returned to the tour calendar in 2019. The event was affiliated with the Women's Tennis Association (WTA), and is an International-level tournament on the WTA Tour.

== Past finals ==
=== Men's singles ===
Year	Location	Champions	Runners-up	Score
Malayan Championships
1921	Singapore	(Japan) Shunjiro Nakamura	(Straits Settlements) Khoo Hooi-Hye	6–4, 6–3
1922	Kuala Lumpur	(Japan) Asaji Honda	(United Kingdom) Eric Oliver	6–3, 6–3
1923	Penang	(Straits Settlements) Khoo Hooi-Hye	(Federated Malay States) Scovell	6–2, 6–0
1924	Ipoh	(Straits Settlements) Asano	(Federated Malay States) Scovell	6–0, 6–3
1925	Singapore	(Straits Settlements) Khoo Hooi-Hye	(United Kingdom) Kenneth Mano	6–3, 6–3
1926	Kuala Lumpur	(Straits Settlements) Khoo Hooi-Hye	(Straits Settlements) Chua Choon Leong	6–4, 6–2
1927	Kuala Lumpur	(Straits Settlements) Khoo Hooi-Hye	(Federated Malay States) Ong Ee Kong	6–1, 6–1
1928	Singapore	(France) Paul Clerc	(Straits Settlements) Khoo Hooi-Hye	5–7, 6–3, 6–3
1929	Kuala Lumpur	(Straits Settlements) Khoo Hooi-Hye	(Straits Settlements) Lim Bong Soo	4–3 rtd.
1930	Singapore	(French Indochina) Huyuh Van Giao	(French Indochina) Nguyen van Chim	w.o.
1931	Kuala Lumpur	(Straits Settlements) Lim Bong Soo	(Federated Malay States) Lam Say Kee	8–6, 7–5
1932	Singapore	(Straits Settlements) Lim Bong Soo	(India) Alexander Pitt	6–0, 6–2
1933	Kuala Lumpur	(Straits Settlements) Lim Bong Soo	(Federated Malay States) H. M. De Souza	9–7 rtd.
1934	Singapore	(Federated Malay States) Chin Kee Onn	(Straits Settlements) Yong Loon Chong Chim	6–2, 6–3
1935	Kuala Lumpur	(Straits Settlements) Lim Bong Soo	(French Indochina) Nguyen van Chim	6–3, 3–6, 6–4
1936	Ipoh	(Dominion of Ceylon) Hildon Sansoni	(Federated Malay States) Rolf Grut	3–6, 6–3, 6–0
1937	Kuala Lumpur	(Federated Malay States) Chin Kee Onn	(Federated Malay States) Rolf Grut	6–2, 8–6
1938	Singapore	(Dutch East Indies) Samboedjo Hoerip	(Dutch East Indies) Lim Djoe Djiem	6–1, 6–2
1939	Ipoh	(Federated Malay States) Chin Kee Onn	(Federated Malay States) Yon bin Mian	6–3, 6–2
1940	Singapore	(Taiwan) Kho Sin-Khie	(Federated Malay States) Chin Kee Onn	6–3, 6–1
1941	Kuala Lumpur	(Taiwan) Kho Sin-Khie	(Federated Malay States) Chin Kee Onn	6–0, 6–2
1942-1947	Not held (due to world war two)			
1948	Penang	(Federation of Malaya) S. C. Beaty	(Federation of Malaya) Goon Kok Lem	6–1, 6–2
1949	Singapore	(British Hong Kong) Koon Hung Ip	(Dutch East Indies) Tan Liep Tjauw	6–3, 6–4
1950	Kuala Lumpur	(Federation of Malaya) Chew Bee Ong	(Colony of Singapore) Chin Kee Onn	6–4, 6–0
1951	Ipoh	(British Hong Kong) Koon Hung Ip	(Federation of Malaya) S. C. Beaty	6–2, 4–6, 6–1
1952	Penang	(British Hong Kong) Koon Hung Ip	(Federation of Malaya) Chew Bee Ong	3–6, 7–5, 7–5
1953	Singapore	(Australia) Neale Fraser	(Federation of Malaya) Chew Bee Ong	6–4, 6–3
1954	Kuala Lumpur	(Federation of Malaya) Chew Bee Ong	(Dominion of Ceylon) Rupert Ferdinands	6–4, 6–1
1955	Ipoh	(Federation of Malaya) Chew Bee Ong	(British Hong Kong) Koon Hung Ip	6–3, 5–7, 6–3
1956	Penang	(Indonesia) Tan Liep Tjauw	(Dominion of Ceylon) Rupert Ferdinands	3–6, 6–3, 6–4
1957	Singapore	(British Hong Kong) Koon Hung Ip	(Indonesia) Tan Liep Tjauw	6–3, 6–4
1958	Kuala Lumpur	(Philippines) Raymundo Deyro	(Indonesia) Koo Hong Boo	7–5, 6–2
1959	Ipoh	(India) Sumant Misra	(Australia) Warren Jacques	6–1, 6–4
1960	Penang City	(Japan) Atsushi Miyagi	(Philippines) Felicisimo Ampon	6–1, 5–7, 6–3
1961	Kuala Lumpur	(Philippines) Johnny Jose	(Philippines) Felicisimo Ampon	6–1, 6–2
1962	Ipoh	(Philippines) Johnny Jose (2)	(New Zealand) Ian Crookenden	6–4, 6–2
1963	Penang City	(Australia) Ken Fletcher	(Australia) Tony Roche	6–4, 4–6, 6–4
Malaysian Open Tennis Championship
1964	Kuala Lumpur	(Japan) Takeshi Koura	(Japan) Isao Watanabe	w.o.
1965	Penang City	(Australia) Bill Bowrey	(Australia) John Newcombe	6–4, 1–6, 6–1
1966	Ipoh	(Thailand) Somparn Champisri	(Thailand) Seri Charuchinda	6–2, 6–2
1967	Kuala Lumpur	(Australia) Allan Stone	(Australia) Colin Stubs	6–1, 6–2
1968	Penang City	(Australia) Doug Smith	(Indonesia) Gondo Widjojo	6–3, 6–3, 2–6, 6–4
↓ Open Era ↓
1969	Kuala Lumpur	(Vietnam) Van Bay Vo	(Australia) Elwyn McCabe	6–4, 2–1, ret.
1970	Kuala Lumpur	(Australia) Colin Dibley	(Vietnam) Van Thanh Vo	6–2, 6–3, 6–4
1971	Kuala Lumpur	(Australia) Ian Fletcher	(Vietnam) Van Thanh Vo	6–1, 6–2, 6–1
1972	Kuala Lumpur	(Indonesia) Gondo Widjojo	(Indonesia) Atet Wijono	4–6, 6–3, 6–4, 3–6, 3–2, ret.
1973	Kuala Lumpur	(India) Anand Amritraj	(Indonesia) Van Bay Vo	7–5, 0–6, 6–4, 7–5
1974	Kuala Lumpur	(Australia) Peter McNamara	(Philippines) Felix Bautista Jr.	8–6, 6–3, 6–2
1975	Petaling Jaya	(Australia) Trevor Little	(Indonesia) Gondo Widjojo	6–3, 6–3
Malaysian Salem Open
1993 (Jan.)	Kuala Lumpur	(United States) Richey Reneberg	(France) Olivier Delaître	6–3, 6–1
1993 (Sept.)	Kuala Lumpur	(United States) Michael Chang	(Sweden) Jonas Svensson	6–0, 6–4
1994	Kuala Lumpur	(Netherlands) Jacco Eltingh	(Russia) Andrei Olhovskiy	7–6, 2–6, 6–4
1995	Kuala Lumpur	(Chile) Marcelo Ríos	(Australia) Mark Philippoussis	7–6, 6–2
Proton Malaysian Open
2009	Kuala Lumpur	(Russia) Nikolay Davydenko	(Spain) Fernando Verdasco	6–4, 7–5
2010	Kuala Lumpur	(Russia) Mikhail Youzhny	(Kazakhstan) Andrey Golubev	6–7^{(7–9)}, 6–2, 7–6^{(7–3)}
2011	Kuala Lumpur	(Serbia) Janko Tipsarević	(Cyprus) Marcos Baghdatis	6–4, 7–5
2012	Kuala Lumpur	(Argentina) Juan Mónaco	(France) Julien Benneteau	7–5, 4–6, 6–3
2013	Kuala Lumpur	(Portugal) João Sousa	(France) Julien Benneteau	2–6, 7–5, 6–4
2014	Kuala Lumpur	(Japan) Kei Nishikori	(France) Julien Benneteau	7–6^{(7–4)}, 6–4
2015	Kuala Lumpur	(Spain) David Ferrer	(Spain) Feliciano López	7–5, 7–5

=== Women's singles ===
Incomplete roll

Year	Location	Champions	Runners-up	Score
Malayan Championships
1925	Singapore	(Straits Settlements) Sybil Dando	(Straits Settlements) Mary Holmes	6–4, 2–6, 6–4
1926	Kuala Lumpur	(Straits Settlements) Mrs N. Toft	(Straits Settlements) Mrs Rule	6–2, 6–2
1927	Kuala Lumpur	(Straits Settlements) Violet Howett Laing	(Straits Settlements) Sybil Dando	3–6, 6–4, 6–2
1928	Singapore	(Straits Settlements) Violet Howett Laing (2)	(Straits Settlements) Mrs Davies	6–4, 2–6, 8–6
1929	Kuala Lumpur	(Straits Settlements) Miss E.M. Aitken	(Straits Settlements) Mrs Zylstra	6–4, 6–3
1930	Singapore	(United Kingdom) Gwendoline Moon Allin	(Straits Settlements) Mrs E.A. Taylor	3–6, 6–1, 6–4
1931	Kuala Lumpur	(Straits Settlements) Elizabeth Oldfield	(Straits Settlements) Mrs Drew	6-3, 2-6, 6-4
1932	Singapore	(Straits Settlements) Elizabeth Oldfield (2)	(Straits Settlements) Mrs E.A. Taylor	6-3, 3-6, 9-7
1933	Kuala Lumpur	(Straits Settlements) Elizabeth Oldfield (3)	(Straits Settlements) Mrs Eileen Corbett	6-4, 6-4
1934	Singapore	(United Kingdom) Gwendoline Moon Allin (2)	(Straits Settlements) Mrs M. Millar	6-3, 6-1
1935	Kuala Lumpur	(United Kingdom) Gwendoline Moon Allin (3)	(Straits Settlements) Violet Howett Laing	6-3, 6-1
1936	Ipoh	(British Ceylon) Doreen Sansoni	(United Kingdom) Gwendoline Moon Allin	3–6, 6–3, 6–1
1937	Kuala Lumpur	(British Ceylon) Doreen Sansoni (2)	(Straits Settlements) Betty Humphrey	6–4, 2–6, 6–4
1938	Singapore	(British Ceylon) Doreen Sansoni (3)	(United Kingdom) Joyce Grenier	6–4, 6–1
1939	Ipoh	(British Ceylon) Doreen Sansoni (4)	(United Kingdom) Gwendoline Moon Allin	6–2, 6–3
1940	Singapore	(United Kingdom) Joyce Grenier Carter	(Republic of China (1912–1949)) Nellie Chia	6–1, 6–0
1941	Kuala Lumpur	(United Kingdom) Joyce Grenier Carter (2)	(United Kingdom) Gwendoline Moon Allin	6–1, 6–0
1942-1947	Not held (due to world war two)			
1948	Penang City	(United Kingdom) Joyce Grenier Fraser (3)	(Argentina) M. Eduardo	6–3, 6–1
1949	Singapore	(United Kingdom) Joyce Grenier Fraser (4)	(Netherlands) Susan de Vries Batten	6–2, 6–4
1950	Kuala Lumpur	(United Kingdom) Helen Thackara Dew	(Federation of Malaya) Gladys Loke Chua	6–4, 6–3
1951	Ipoh	(United Kingdom) Helen Thackara Dew (2)	(Netherlands) Susan de Vries Batten	6–1, 6–3
1952	Penang City	(United Kingdom) Helen Thackara Dew (3)	(British Hong Kong) Mrs Koon Hung Ip	6–4, 6–3
1953	Singapore	(Netherlands) Susan de Vries Batten	(Federation of Malaya) Mrs Martha Young	6–3, 3–6, 6–3
1954	Kuala Lumpur	(United Kingdom) Monica Ereaut Sheridan	(Federation of Malaya) Gladys Loke Chua	6–0, 6–0
1955	Ipoh	(Federation of Malaya) Gladys Loke Chua	(United Kingdom) Helen Thackara Dew	6–3 8–6
1956	Penang City	(Federation of Malaya) Mrs K. Le Mercier	(Federation of Malaya) Mrs R. Hamilton	6–3, 6–3
1957	Singapore	(Dominion of Ceylon) Ranjani Jayasuriya	(Federation of Malaya) Katherine Leong	6–0, 6–0
1958	Kuala Lumpur	(United Kingdom) Heather MacFarlane Stirling	(Federation of Malaya) Mrs Tan Liep Tjiauw	14–12, 6–4
1959	Ipoh	(United Kingdom) Heather MacFarlane Stirling (2)	(Thailand) Mrs Sanguan Sucharitakul	6–3, 6–3
1960	Penang City	(Thailand) Mrs Sanguan Sucharitakul	(Federation of Malaya) Katherine Leong	4–0 ret.
1961	Kuala Lumpur	(Japan) Reiko Miyagi	(Philippines) Desideria Ampon	6–3, 6–1
1962	Ipoh	(New Zealand) Ethne Green	(New Zealand) Judy Davidson	7–5 6–3
1963	Penang City	(Australia) Noelene Turner	(New Zealand) Ethne Green	8–6, 7–5
Malaysian Open Tennis Championship
1964	Kuala Lumpur	(Thailand) Phanow Sudsawasdi	(British Hong Kong) Maisie Lai	6–4, 6–2
1965	Penang City	(Thailand) Phanow Sudsawasdi (2)	(Thailand) Phisamai Samerpong	7–5, 2–6, 6–0
1966	Ipoh	(Thailand) Phanow Sudsawasdi (3)	(Federation of Malaya) Mien Suhadi	6–8, 6–0, 6–3
1967	Kuala Lumpur	(Indonesia) Lita Liem	(Indonesia) Lany Kaligis	6–2, 4–6, 7–5
1968	Penang City	(Indonesia) Lita Liem (2)	(Indonesia) Loanita Rachman	6–4, 6–2
↓ Open Era ↓
1969	Kuala Lumpur	(Federation of Malaya) Radhika Menon	(Vietnam) Nguyen Thi Gioi	5–7, 6–1, 6-2
1970	Kuala Lumpur	(Singapore) Mrs Philippa Miall	(Thailand) Mrs Somsri Chotichuti	4–6, 6–2, 7–5
1971	Kuala Lumpur	(New Zealand) Cecilie Fleming	(Thailand) Somsri Klamssombuti	7–5, 6–4
1972	Kuala Lumpur	(Singapore) Mrs Philippa Miall (2)	(Singapore) Mrs Vera Kaspers	13–11, 6–1
1974	Kuala Lumpur	(Indonesia) Lany Kaligis	(Indonesia) Lita Liem Sugiarto	7–5, 3–6, 6–3
1975	Petaling Jaya	(Indonesia) Lany Kaligis (2)	(Indonesia) Lita Liem Sugiarto	6–2, 6–4
1976	Kuala Lumpur	(Indonesia) Lita Liem Sugiarto	(Thailand) Suthasini Sirikaya	6–0, 6–3
1977	Kuala Lumpur	(South Korea) Duk-Hee Lee	(South Korea) Choi Kyung Mie	6–2, 6–1
1978	Kuala Lumpur	(South Korea) Chong Soog Yang	(Australia) Carol Draper	7–5, 6–2
Malaysian Tennis Classic
1992	Kuala Lumpur	(Indonesia) Yayuk Basuki	(Czechoslovakia) Andrea Strnadová	6–3, 6–0
1993	Kuala Lumpur	(Australia) Nicole Provis	(United States) Ann Grossman	6–3, 6–2
Malaysian Open
2010	Kuala Lumpur	(Russia) Alisa Kleybanova	(Russia) Elena Dementieva	6–3, 6–2
BMW Malaysian Open
2011	Kuala Lumpur	(Australia) Jelena Dokić	(Czech Republic) Lucie Šafářová	2–6, 7–6^{(11–9)}, 6–4
2012	Kuala Lumpur	(Chinese Taipei) Hsieh Su-wei	(Croatia) Petra Martić	2–6, 7–5, 4–1 ret.
2013	Kuala Lumpur	(Czech Republic) Karolína Plíšková	(United States) Bethanie Mattek-Sands	1–6, 7–5, 6–3
2014	Kuala Lumpur	(Croatia) Donna Vekić	(Slovakia) Dominika Cibulková	5–7, 7–5, 7–6^{(7–4)}
2015	Kuala Lumpur	(Denmark) Caroline Wozniacki	(Romania) Alexandra Dulgheru	4–6, 6–2, 6–1
2016	Kuala Lumpur	(Ukraine) Elina Svitolina	(Canada) Eugenie Bouchard	6–7^{(5–7)}, 6–4, 7–5
Alya Malaysian Open
2017	Kuala Lumpur	(Australia) Ashleigh Barty	(Japan) Nao Hibino	6–3, 6–2

=== Women's doubles ===
Year	Champions	Runners-up	Score
Malaysian Tennis Classic
1992	(France) Isabelle Demongeot (Ukraine) Natalia Medvedeva	(Japan) Rika Hiraki (Czechoslovakia) Petra Langrová	2–6, 6–4, 6–1
1993	(United States) Patty Fendick (United States) Meredith McGrath	(United States) Nicole Arendt (Australia) Kristine Kunce	6–4, 7–6^{(7–2)}
Malaysian Open
2010	(Chinese Taipei) Chan Yung-jan (China) Zheng Jie	(Australia) Anastasia Rodionova (Russia) Arina Rodionova	6–7^{(4–7)}, 6–2, [10–7]
BMW Malaysian Open
2011	(Russia) Dinara Safina (Kazakhstan) Galina Voskoboeva	(Thailand) Noppawan Lertcheewakarn (Australia) Jessica Moore	7–5, 2–6, [10–5]
2012	(Chinese Taipei) Chang Kai-chen (Chinese Taipei) Chuang Chia-jung	(Chinese Taipei) Chan Hao-ching (Japan) Rika Fujiwara	7–5, 6–4
2013	(Japan) Shuko Aoyama (Chinese Taipei) Chang Kai-chen (2)	(Slovakia) Janette Husárová (China) Zhang Shuai	6–7^{(4–7)}, 7–6^{(7–4)}, [14–12]
2014	(Hungary) Tímea Babos (Chinese Taipei) Chan Hao-ching	(Chinese Taipei) Chan Yung-jan (China) Zheng Saisai	6–3, 6–4
2015	(China) Liang Chen (China) Wang Yafan	(Ukraine) Yuliya Beygelzimer (Ukraine) Olga Savchuk	4–6, 6–3, [10–4]
2016	(Thailand) Varatchaya Wongteanchai (China) Yang Zhaoxuan	(China) Liang Chen (China) Wang Yafan	4–6, 6–4, [10–7]
Alya Malaysian Open
2017	(Australia) Ashleigh Barty (Australia) Casey Dellacqua	(United States) Nicole Melichar (Japan) Makoto Ninomiya	7–6^{(7–5)}, 6–3

== Event names ==
- Malayan Championships (1921–63) men and women
- Malaysian Open Tennis Championship (1964–78) men and women
- Malaysian Tennis Classic (1992–93) women
- Kuala Lumpur Open (aka Malaysia Salem Open) (1993–95) men
- Proton Malaysian Open (2009-2013) men
- Malaysian Open (2010) women (2014–15) men
- BMW Malaysian Open (2011–16) women
- Alya Malaysian Open (2017) women
