= 2001 Davis Cup Asia/Oceania Zone Group III =

International tennis competition

The Asia/Oceania Zone was one of the three zones of the regional Davis Cup competition in 2001.

In the Asia/Oceania Zone, teams competed against each other to advance to the highest ranking, which was separated into four tiers, or groups. While the bottom two teams were relegated to the Asia/Oceania Zone Group IV in 2002, the top two teams in Group III progressed on to the Asia/Oceania Zone Group II.

== Participating nations ==
- Bahrain
- Kazakhstan
- Philippines
- Qatar
- Saudi Arabia
- Singapore
- Sri Lanka
- Tajikistan

== Draw ==
- Venue: Rizal Memorial Sports Complex, Manila, Philippines
- Date: 7–11 February

Group A

	PHI	SIN	SRI	BHR	RR; W–L	Match; W–L	Set; W–L	Standings
Philippines		3–0	3–0	3–0	3–0	9–0 (100%)	27–1 (96%)	1
Singapore	0–3		2–1	3–0	2–1	5–4 (56%)	16–13 (55%)	2
Sri Lanka	0–3	1–2		2–1	1–2	3–6 (33%)	10–21 (32%)	3
Bahrain	0–3	0–3	1–2		0–3	1–8 (11%)	6–24 (20%)	4

Group B

	KAZ	TJK	KSA	QAT	RR; W–L	Match; W–L	Set; W–L	Standings
Kazakhstan		3–0	3–0	3–0	3–0	9–0 (100%)	27–4 (87%)	1
Tajikistan	0–3		2–1	2–1	2–1	4–5 (44%)	14–18 (44%)	2
Saudi Arabia	0–3	1–2		2–1	1–2	3–6 (33%)	13–21 (38%)	3
Qatar	0–3	1–2	1–2		0–3	2–7 (22%)	10–21 (32%)	4

1st to 4th place play-offs

3rd-4th Play-off
B2	Tajikistan	2
B2	Singapore	1

Semifinals
A1	Philippines	2
B2	Tajikistan	1
A2	Singapore	0
B1	Kazakhstan	2

Final
A1	Philippines	0
B1	Kazakhstan	2

5th to 8th place play-offs

7th-8th Play-off
A3	Sri Lanka	2
A4	Bahrain	0

5th-8th Play-offs
A3	Sri Lanka	1
B4	Qatar	2
A4	Bahrain	0
B3	Saudi Arabia	2

5th-6th Play-off
A3	Qatar	2
B3	Saudi Arabia	1

=== Final standings ===
Rank	Team
1	Kazakhstan
2	Philippines
3	Tajikistan
4	Singapore
5	Saudi Arabia
6	Qatar
7	Sri Lanka
8	Bahrain

- Kazakhstan and Philippines promoted to Group II in 2002.
- Sri Lanka and Bahrain relegated to Group IV in 2002.

== Round robin ==
=== Group A ===
==== Philippines vs. Singapore ====
Philippines
3
Rizal Memorial Sports Complex, Manila, Philippines
7 February 2001

Singapore
0

			1	2	3	4	5
1	(Philippines) (Singapore)	Johnny Arcilla; Jensen Hiu	4; 0	4; 2	4; 2
2	(Philippines) (Singapore)	Adelo Abadia; Kho Tung-yi	4; 1	5; 3	4; 1
3	(Philippines) (Singapore)	Rolando Ruel / Joseph Victorino; Ong Jun / Tan Li-shen	5; 3	4; 2	4; 1

==== Bahrain vs. Sri Lanka ====
Bahrain
1
Rizal Memorial Sports Complex, Manila, Philippines
7 February 2001

Sri Lanka
2

			1	2	3	4	5
1	(Bahrain) (Sri Lanka)	Bader Abdul-Aal; Renouk Wijemanne	0; 4	1; 4	0; 4
2	(Bahrain) (Sri Lanka)	Abdul-Rahman Shehab; Dinuka Ranaweera	5; 3	4; 1	4; 1
3	(Bahrain) (Sri Lanka)	Saeed Ismail / Abdul-Rahman Shehab; Ganendran Subramaniam / Renouk Wijemanne	5^{8} 4^{6}	2; 4	4; 1	3; 5	2; 4

==== Philippines vs. Bahrain ====
Philippines
3
Rizal Memorial Sports Complex, Manila, Philippines
8 February 2001

Bahrain
0

			1	2	3	4	5
1	(Philippines) (Bahrain)	Johnny Arcilla; Bader Abdul-Aal	4; 0	4; 0	4; 0
2	(Philippines) (Bahrain)	Adelo Abadia; Saeed Ismail	4; 0	4; 1	4; 0
3	(Philippines) (Bahrain)	Rolando Ruel / Joseph Victorino; Omar-Mohammed Ahmed / Saeed Ismail	5; 3	4; 1	5^{10} 4^{8}

==== Sri Lanka vs. Singapore ====
Sri Lanka
1
Rizal Memorial Sports Complex, Manila, Philippines
8 February 2001

Singapore
2

			1	2	3	4	5
1	(Sri Lanka) (Singapore)	Renouk Wijemanne; Jensen Hiu	4; 0	2; 4	4; 2	4; 1
2	(Sri Lanka) (Singapore)	Dinuka Ranaweera; Kho Tung-yi	3; 5	2; 4	1; 4
3	(Sri Lanka) (Singapore)	Ganendran Subramaniam / Renouk Wijemanne; Jensen Hiu / Kho Tung-yi	2; 4	1; 4	2; 4

==== Philippines vs. Sri Lanka ====
Philippines
3
Rizal Memorial Sports Complex, Manila, Philippines
9 February 2001

Sri Lanka
0

			1	2	3	4	5
1	(Philippines) (Sri Lanka)	Johnny Arcilla; Renouk Wijemanne	4; 2	4; 2	5^{7} 4^{2}
2	(Philippines) (Sri Lanka)	Adelo Abadia; Dinuka Ranaweera	4; 0	4; 0	4; 1
3	(Philippines) (Sri Lanka)	Rolando Ruel / Joseph Victorino; Dinuka Ranaweera / Ganendran Subramaniam	2; 4	4; 1	4; 0	5; 3

==== Bahrain vs. Singapore ====
Bahrain
0
Rizal Memorial Sports Complex, Manila, Philippines
9 February 2001

Singapore
3

			1	2	3	4	5
1	(Bahrain) (Singapore)	Abdul-Rahman Shehab; Jensen Hiu	4^{5} 5^{7}	1; 4	4; 2	1; 4
2	(Bahrain) (Singapore)	Saeed Ismail; Kho Tung-yi	0; 4	1; 4	0; 4
3	(Bahrain) (Singapore)	Bader Abdul-Aal / Omar-Mohammed Ahmed; Ong Jun / Tan Li-shen	3; 5	4^{3} 5^{7}	3; 5

=== Group B ===
==== Kazakhstan vs. Qatar ====
Kazakhstan
3
Rizal Memorial Sports Complex, Manila, Philippines
7 February 2001

Qatar
0

			1	2	3	4	5
1	(Kazakhstan) (Qatar)	Pavel Baranov; Nasser Al-Khelaifi	5^{7} 4^{3}	4; 1	5^{7} 4^{2}
2	(Kazakhstan) (Qatar)	Alexey Kedryuk; Sultan Al-Alawi	4; 1	4; 0	4; 1
3	(Kazakhstan) (Qatar)	Dias Doskarayev / Alexey Kedryuk; Sultan Al-Alawi / Nasser Al-Khelaifi	4; 2	4; 1	4; 1

==== Saudi Arabia vs. Tajikistan ====
Saudi Arabia
1
Rizal Memorial Sports Complex, Manila, Philippines
7 February 2001

Tajikistan
2

			1	2	3	4	5
1	(Saudi Arabia) (Tajikistan)	Bader Mohammed Almuqail; Sergey Makashin	4; 0	4; 2	4; 0
2	(Saudi Arabia) (Tajikistan)	Abdullah Nour; Mansur Yakhyaev	2; 4	1; 4	3; 5
3	(Saudi Arabia) (Tajikistan)	Othman Al-Anazi / Bader Mohammed Almuqail; Sergey Makashin / Mansur Yakhyaev	4; 2	4^{5} 5^{7}	5; 3	1; 4	2; 4

==== Kazakhstan vs. Saudi Arabia ====
Kazakhstan
3
Rizal Memorial Sports Complex, Manila, Philippines
8 February 2001

Saudi Arabia
0

			1	2	3	4	5
1	(Kazakhstan) (Saudi Arabia)	Pavel Baranov; Bader Mohammed Almuqail	4; 2	2; 4	2; 4	4; 1	4; 1
2	(Kazakhstan) (Saudi Arabia)	Alexey Kedryuk; Othman Al-Anazi	4; 0	4; 0	4; 0
3	(Kazakhstan) (Saudi Arabia)	Dias Doskarayev / Alexey Kedryuk; Baqer Abu Khulaif / Abdullah Nour	4; 0	4; 1	4; 1

==== Tajikistan vs. Qatar ====
Tajikistan
2
Rizal Memorial Sports Complex, Manila, Philippines
8 February 2001

Qatar
1

			1	2	3	4	5
1	(Tajikistan) (Qatar)	Sergey Makashin; Nasser Al-Khelaifi	1; 4	4; 2	4; 1	4; 2
2	(Tajikistan) (Qatar)	Mansur Yakhyaev; Sultan Al-Alawi	4; 2	5; 3	4; 0
3	(Tajikistan) (Qatar)	Sergey Makashin / Dilshod Sharifi; Nasser Al-Khelaifi / Mohammed-Abdullah Shaheen	2; 4	3; 5	1; 4

==== Kazakhstan vs. Tajikistan ====
Kazakhstan
3
Rizal Memorial Sports Complex, Manila, Philippines
9 February 2001

Tajikistan
0

			1	2	3	4	5
1	(Kazakhstan) (Tajikistan)	Pavel Baranov; Sergey Makashin	4; 2	4; 1	4; 0
2	(Kazakhstan) (Tajikistan)	Alexey Kedryuk; Mansur Yakhyaev	0; 4	3; 5	4; 2	5; 3	4; 2
3	(Kazakhstan) (Tajikistan)	Pavel Baranov / Dias Doskarayev; Sergey Makashin / Dilshod Sharifi	5; 3	4; 0	4; 1

==== Saudi Arabia vs. Qatar ====
Saudi Arabia
2
Rizal Memorial Sports Complex, Manila, Philippines
9 February 2001

Qatar
1

			1	2	3	4	5
1	(Saudi Arabia) (Qatar)	Bader Mohammed Almuqail; Nasser Al-Khelaifi	2; 4	4^{8} 5^{10}	5^{7} 4^{4}	4; 2	7; 5
2	(Saudi Arabia) (Qatar)	Abdullah Nour; Sultan Al-Alawi	1; 4	0; 4	1; 4
3	(Saudi Arabia) (Qatar)	Othman Al-Anazi / Bader Mohammed Almuqail; Sultan Al-Alawi / Mohammed-Abdullah Shaheen	5^{7} 4^{2}	4; 2	0; 4	4; 1

== 1st to 4th place play-offs ==
=== Semifinals ===
==== Philippines vs. Tajikistan ====
Philippines
2
Rizal Memorial Sports Complex, Manila, Philippines
10 February 2001

Tajikistan
1

			1	2	3	4	5
1	(Philippines) (Tajikistan)	Johnny Arcilla; Sergey Makashin	4; 2	4; 2	4; 0
2	(Philippines) (Tajikistan)	Adelo Abadia; Mansur Yakhyaev	2; 4	1; 4	1; 4
3	(Philippines) (Tajikistan)	Adelo Abadia / Johnny Arcilla; Sergey Makashin / Mansur Yakhyaev	3; 5	4^{2} 5^{7}	4; 2	4; 1	4; 0

==== Kazakhstan vs. Singapore ====
Kazakhstan
2
Rizal Memorial Sports Complex, Manila, Philippines
10 February 2001

Singapore
0

			1	2	3	4	5
1	(Kazakhstan) (Singapore)	Pavel Baranov; Jensen Hiu	4; 1	5^{7} 4^{2}	4; 1
2	(Kazakhstan) (Singapore)	Alexey Kedryuk; Kho Tung-yi	4; 1	4; 2	4; 0
3	(Kazakhstan) (Singapore)	Dias Doskarayev / Alexey Kedryuk; Ong Jun / Tan Li-shen						not played

=== Final ===
==== Philippines vs. Kazakhstan ====
Philippines
0
Rizal Memorial Sports Complex, Manila, Philippines
11 February 2001

Kazakhstan
2

			1	2	3	4	5
1	(Philippines) (Kazakhstan)	Joseph Victorino; Pavel Baranov	0; 4	0; 4	4; 1	0; 4
2	(Philippines) (Kazakhstan)	Rolando Ruel; Alexey Kedryuk	1; 4	0; 4	1; 4
3	(Philippines) (Kazakhstan)	Adelo Abadia / Johnny Arcilla; Dias Doskarayev / Alexey Kedryuk						not played

=== 3rd to 4th play-off ===
==== Tajikistan vs. Singapore ====
Tajikistan
2
Rizal Memorial Sports Complex, Manila, Philippines
11 February 2001

Singapore
1

			1	2	3	4	5
1	(Tajikistan) (Singapore)	Sergey Makashin; Ong Jun	4; 0	4; 0	4; 0
2	(Tajikistan) (Singapore)	Mansur Yakhyaev; Kho Tung-yi	4^{6} 5^{8}	1; 4	0; 4
3	(Tajikistan) (Singapore)	Sergey Makashin / Mansur Yakhyaev; Jensen Hiu / Tan Li-shen	4; 1	5^{7} 4^{1}	4; 1

== 5th to 8th place play-offs ==
=== 5th to 8th play-offs ===
==== Sri Lanka vs. Qatar ====
Sri Lanka
1
Rizal Memorial Sports Complex, Manila, Philippines
10 February 2001

Qatar
2

			1	2	3	4	5
1	(Sri Lanka) (Qatar)	Renouk Wijemanne; Mohammed-Abdullah Shaheen	4; 1	4; 0	4; 1
2	(Sri Lanka) (Qatar)	Dinuka Ranaweera; Sultan Al-Alawi	2; 4	1; 4	0; 4
3	(Sri Lanka) (Qatar)	Ganendran Subramaniam / Renouk Wijemanne; Sultan Al-Alawi / Nasser Al-Khelaifi	0; 4	1; 4	3; 5

==== Saudi Arabia vs. Bahrain ====
Saudi Arabia
2
Rizal Memorial Sports Complex, Manila, Philippines
10 February 2001

Bahrain
0

			1	2	3	4	5
1	(Saudi Arabia) (Bahrain)	Bader Mohammed Almuqail; Omar-Mohammed Ahmed	4; 1	4; 0	4; 0
2	(Saudi Arabia) (Bahrain)	Abdullah Nour; Saeed Ismail	4; 1	4; 2	4; 0
3	(Saudi Arabia) (Bahrain)	Baqer Abu Khulaif / Othman Al-Anazi; Omar-Mohammed Ahmed / Saeed Ismail						not played

=== 5th to 6th play-off ===
==== Qatar vs. Saudi Arabia ====
Qatar
2
Rizal Memorial Sports Complex, Manila, Philippines
11 February 2001

Saudi Arabia
1

			1	2	3	4	5
1	(Qatar) (Saudi Arabia)	Nasser Al-Khelaifi; Othman Al-Anazi	4; 1	4; 1	4^{4} 5^{7}	4; 1
2	(Qatar) (Saudi Arabia)	Mohammed-Abdullah Shaheen; Abdullah Nour	2; 4	1; 4	4^{4} 5^{7}
3	(Qatar) (Saudi Arabia)	Nasser Al-Khelaifi / Mohammed-Abdullah Shaheen; Baqer Abu Khulaif / Othman Al-Anazi	4; 0	5^{7} 4^{5}	1; 4	5^{7} 4^{3}

=== 7th to 8th play-off ===
==== Sri Lanka vs. Bahrain ====
Sri Lanka
2
Rizal Memorial Sports Complex, Manila, Philippines
11 February 2001

Bahrain
0

			1	2	3	4	5
1	(Sri Lanka) (Bahrain)	Chamara Wijesinghe; Bader Abdul-Aal	3; 5	4; 2	5^{7} 4^{5}	5; 3
2	(Sri Lanka) (Bahrain)	Dinuka Ranaweera; Abdul-Rahman Shehab	1; 4	4; 2	5; 3	4; 0
3	(Sri Lanka) (Bahrain)	Ganendran Subramaniam / Renouk Wijemanne; Omar-Mohammed Ahmed / Saeed Ismail						not played
