= 1995 Davis Cup Asia/Oceania Zone Group II =

International tennis competition

The Asia/Oceania Zone was one of the three zones of the regional Davis Cup competition in 1995.

In the Asia/Oceania Zone there were three different tiers, called groups, in which teams compete against each other to advance to the upper tier. Winners in Group II advanced to the Asia/Oceania Zone Group I. Teams who lost their respective ties competed in the relegation play-offs, with winning teams remaining in Group II, whereas teams who lost their play-offs were relegated to the Asia/Oceania Zone Group III in 1996.

== Participating nations ==
- China
- Iran
- Malaysia
- Pakistan
- Qatar
- Sri Lanka
- Thailand
- Uzbekistan

=== Draw ===
Relegation Play-offs
Lahore, Pakistan (grass)
Pakistan	4
Malaysia	1
Doha, Qatar (hard)
Qatar	1
Iran	4

First Round
Lahore, Pakistan (grass)
China	3
Pakistan	2
Bangkok, Thailand (hard)
Malaysia	1
Thailand	4
Doha, Qatar (hard)
Uzbekistan	5
Qatar	0
Colombo, Sri Lanka (clay)
Sri Lanka	3
Iran	2

Second Round
Bangkok, Thailand (hard)
China	3
Thailand	2
Tashkent, Uzbekistan (clay)
Uzbekistan	5
Sri Lanka	0

Third Round
Tashkent, Uzbekistan (clay)
China	3
Uzbekistan	2

- Malaysia and Qatar relegated to Group III in 1996.
- China promoted to Group I in 1996.

== First round ==
=== Pakistan vs. China ===
Pakistan
2
Punjab Tennis Club, Lahore, Pakistan
3–5 February 1995
Grass

China
3

			1	2	3	4	5
1	(Pakistan) (China)	Omer Rashid; Pan Bing	6; 4	6^{2} 7^{7}	5; 7	6^{5} 7^{7}
2	(Pakistan) (China)	Mohamed-Khaliq Siddiq; Xia Jiaping	5; 7	6; 4	6; 2	3; 6	6; 3
3	(Pakistan) (China)	Mohamed-Khaliq Siddiq / Omer Rashid; Pan Bing / Xia Jiaping	4; 6	5; 7	6; 4	6^{11} 7^{13}
4	(Pakistan) (China)	Mohamed-Khaliq Siddiq; Pan Bing	6; 3	7^{7} 6^{2}	1; 6	7^{7} 6^{4}
5	(Pakistan) (China)	Omer Rashid; Xia Jiaping	6^{5} 7^{7}	4; 6	7^{7} 6^{4}	5; 7

=== Thailand vs. Malaysia ===
Thailand
4
Thana City Country Club, Bangkok, Thailand
3–5 February 1995
Hard

Malaysia
1

			1	2	3	4	5
1	(Thailand) (Malaysia)	Narathorn Srichaphan; Ramayah Ramachandran	6; 1	6; 2	6; 2
2	(Thailand) (Malaysia)	Woraphol Thongkhamchu; Adam Malik	1; 6	6; 4	4; 6	4; 6
3	(Thailand) (Malaysia)	Vittaya Samrej / Narathorn Srichaphan; Adam Malik / Ramayah Ramachandran	4; 6	6; 2	4; 6	6; 3	6; 4
4	(Thailand) (Malaysia)	Narathorn Srichaphan; Khoo Kim-huat	6; 4	6; 4	6; 1
5	(Thailand) (Malaysia)	Woraphol Thongkhamchu; Ramayah Ramachandran	6; 1	7; 5

=== Qatar vs. Uzbekistan ===
Qatar
0
Khalifa International Tennis and Squash Complex, Doha, Qatar
3–5 February 1995
Hard

Uzbekistan
5

			1	2	3	4	5
1	(Qatar) (Uzbekistan)	Nasser Al-Khelaifi; Oleg Ogorodov	1; 6	4; 6	1; 6
2	(Qatar) (Uzbekistan)	Sultan Al-Alawi; Dmitri Tomashevich	3; 6	2; 6	3; 6
3	(Qatar) (Uzbekistan)	Mohammed Salem Al-Khelaifi / Nasser Al-Khelaifi; Oleg Ogorodov / Dmitri Tomashevich	0; 6	1; 6
4	(Qatar) (Uzbekistan)	Sultan Al-Alawi; Oleg Ogorodov	3; 6	3; 6	2; 6
5	(Qatar) (Uzbekistan)	Nasser Al-Khelaifi; Dmitri Tomashevich	1; 6	0; 6

=== Sri Lanka vs. Iran ===
Sri Lanka
3
National Stadium, Colombo, Sri Lanka
3–5 February 1995
Clay

Iran
2

			1	2	3	4	5
1	(Sri Lanka) (Iran)	Jayendra Wijeyesekera; Ramin Raziani	6; 3	6; 3	6^{2} 7^{7}	6; 4
2	(Sri Lanka) (Iran)	Rohan de Silva; Mohammed-Reza Tavakoli	6; 2	6; 4	3; 6	6^{2} 7^{7}	6; 2
3	(Sri Lanka) (Iran)	Malik-Sanjaya Wijemanne / Jayendra Wijeyesekera; Ramin Raziani / Jahanbakhsh Souri	6; 3	1; 6	4; 6	2; 6
4	(Sri Lanka) (Iran)	Jayendra Wijeyesekera; Mohammed-Reza Tavakoli	6^{4} 7^{7}	5; 7	2; 6
5	(Sri Lanka) (Iran)	Rohan de Silva; Ramin Raziani	6; 3	7; 5	6; 2

== Second round ==
=== Thailand vs. China ===
Thailand
2
Thana City Country Club, Bangkok, Thailand
31 March–2 April 1995
Hard

China
3

			1	2	3	4	5
1	(Thailand) (China)	Woraphol Thongkhamchu; Pan Bing	5; 7	4; 6	6; 4	5; 7
2	(Thailand) (China)	Narathorn Srichaphan; Xia Jiaping	2; 6	5; 7	3; 6
3	(Thailand) (China)	Vittaya Samrej / Tanakorn Srichaphan; Pan Bing / Xia Jiaping	6^{1} 7^{7}	6; 3	4; 6	4; 6
4	(Thailand) (China)	Narathorn Srichaphan; Pan Bing	6; 3	7; 5
5	(Thailand) (China)	Woraphol Thongkhamchu; Xia Jiaping	6; 2	7^{8} 6^{6}

=== Uzbekistan vs. Sri Lanka ===
Uzbekistan
5
Dynamo Tennis Club, Tashkent, Uzbekistan
31 March–2 April 1995
Clay

Sri Lanka
0

			1	2	3	4	5
1	(Uzbekistan) (Sri Lanka)	Dmitri Tomashevich; Jayendra Wijeyesekera	6; 2	6; 1	6; 0
2	(Uzbekistan) (Sri Lanka)	Oleg Ogorodov; Rohan de Silva	6; 2	6; 1	6; 4
3	(Uzbekistan) (Sri Lanka)	Vadim Kutsenko / Dmitri Tomashevich; Rohan de Silva / Senaka Kumara	6; 1	6; 3	6; 2
4	(Uzbekistan) (Sri Lanka)	Oleg Ogorodov; Jayendra Wijeyesekera	6; 3	7; 5
5	(Uzbekistan) (Sri Lanka)	Dmitri Tomashevich; Rohan de Silva	6; 0	6; 0

== Relegation play-offs ==
=== Pakistan vs. Malaysia ===
Pakistan
4
Punjab Tennis Club, Lahore, Pakistan
31 March–2 April 1995
Grass

Malaysia
1

			1	2	3	4	5
1	(Pakistan) (Malaysia)	Mohamed-Khaliq Siddiq; Adam Malik	4; 6	6; 4	6^{3} 7^{7}	7^{7} 6^{2}	12; 10
2	(Pakistan) (Malaysia)	Omer Rashid; Selvam Veerasingam	4; 6	7; 5	6^{2} 7^{7}	6^{8} 7^{10}
3	(Pakistan) (Malaysia)	Mohamed-Khaliq Siddiq / Omer Rashid; Ramayah Ramachandran / Selvam Veerasingam	7^{7} 6^{5}	6; 3	6; 3
4	(Pakistan) (Malaysia)	Mohamed-Khaliq Siddiq; Selvam Veerasingam	2; 6	6; 3	7; 5	6; 3
5	(Pakistan) (Malaysia)	Omer Rashid; Ramayah Ramachandran	6; 1	6; 2

=== Qatar vs. Iran ===
Qatar
1
Khalifa International Tennis and Squash Complex, Doha, Qatar
31 March–2 April 1995
Hard

Iran
4

			1	2	3	4	5
1	(Qatar) (Iran)	Sultan Al-Alawi; Jahanbakhsh Souri	4; 6	0; 6	1; 6
2	(Qatar) (Iran)	Nasser Al-Khelaifi; Mohammed-Reza Tavakoli	4; 6	0; 6	2; 6
3	(Qatar) (Iran)	Sultan Al-Alawi / Nasser Al-Khelaifi; Kamyab Derafshijavan / Jahanbakhsh Souri	6; 4	3; 6	6; 4	6; 4
4	(Qatar) (Iran)	Sultan Al-Alawi; Mohammed-Reza Tavakoli	4; 6	2; 6	0; 2			retired
5	(Qatar) (Iran)	Nasser Al-Khelaifi; Jahanbakhsh Souri	6; 3	6^{4} 7^{7}	2; 6

== Third round ==
=== Uzbekistan vs. China ===
Uzbekistan
2
Dynamo Tennis Club, Tashkent, Uzbekistan
22–24 September 1995
Clay

China
3

			1	2	3	4	5
1	(Uzbekistan) (China)	Oleg Ogorodov; Xia Jiaping	6; 2	4; 6	6; 2	6; 1
2	(Uzbekistan) (China)	Dmitri Tomashevich; Pan Bing	5; 7	6; 4	7^{8} 6^{6}	0; 6	2; 6
3	(Uzbekistan) (China)	Vadim Kutsenko / Oleg Ogorodov; Pan Bing / Xia Jiaping	6; 3	4; 6	2; 6	6; 3	0; 6
4	(Uzbekistan) (China)	Oleg Ogorodov; Pan Bing	6; 3	7; 5	6; 3
5	(Uzbekistan) (China)	Vadim Kutsenko; Xia Jiaping	1; 6	2; 6	6^{7} 7^{9}
