= 1997 Davis Cup Asia/Oceania Zone Group III =

International tennis competition

The Asia/Oceania Zone was one of the three zones of the regional Davis Cup competition in 1997.

In the Asia/Oceania Zone there were four different tiers, called groups, in which teams competed against each other to advance to the upper tier. The top two teams in Group III advanced to the Asia/Oceania Zone Group II in 1998, whereas the bottom two teams were relegated to the Asia/Oceania Zone Group IV in 1998.

== Participating nations ==
- Bahrain
- Bangladesh
- Kazakhstan
- Kuwait
- Malaysia
- Pacific Oceania
- Sri Lanka
- Qatar

=== Draw ===
- Venue: Khalifa International Tennis and Squash Complex, Doha, Qatar
- Date: 26–30 March

Group A

	KAZ	KUW	BHR	BAN	RR; W–L	Match; W–L	Set; W–L	Standings
Kazakhstan		2–1	2–1	3–0	3–0	7–2 (78%)	14–6 (70%)	1
Kuwait	1–2		2–1	3–0	2–1	6–3 (67%)	12–7 (63%)	2
Bahrain	1–2	1–2		2–1	1–2	4–5 (44%)	10–10 (50%)	3
Bangladesh	0–3	0–3	1–2		0–3	1–8 (11%)	3–16 (16%)	4

Group B

	POC	QAT	SRI	MAS	RR; W–L	Match; W–L	Set; W–L	Standings
Pacific Oceania		2–1	2–1	1–2	2–1	5–4 (56%)	10–13 (43%)	1
Qatar	1–2		2–1	2–1	2–1	5–4 (56%)	13–10 (57%)	2
Sri Lanka	1–2	1–2		3–0	1–2	5–4 (56%)	13–9 (59%)	3
Malaysia	2–1	1–2	0–3		1–2	3–6 (33%)	9–13 (41%)	4

1st to 4th place play-offs

3rd-4th Play-off
A1	Kazakhstan	3
A2	Kuwait	0

Semifinals
A1	Kazakhstan	1
B2	Qatar	2
A2	Kuwait	1
B1	Pacific Oceania	2

Final
B2	Qatar	2
B1	Pacific Oceania	1

5th to 8th place play-offs

7th-8th Play-off
A3	Bahrain	2
A4	Bangladesh	1

5th-8th Play-offs
A3	Bahrain	1
B4	Malaysia	2
A4	Bangladesh	1
B3	Sri Lanka	2

5th-6th Play-off
B4	Malaysia	3
B3	Sri Lanka	0

=== Final standings ===
Rank	Team
1	Qatar
2	Pacific Oceania
3	Kazakhstan
4	Kuwait
5	Malaysia
6	Sri Lanka
7	Bahrain
8	Bangladesh

- Qatar and Pacific Oceania promoted to Group II in 1998.
- Bahrain and Bangladesh relegated to Group IV in 1998.

== Round robin ==
=== Group A ===
==== Bangladesh vs. Kuwait ====
Bangladesh
0
Khalifa International Tennis and Squash Complex, Doha, Qatar
26 March 1997

Kuwait
3

			1	2	3
1	(Bangladesh) (Kuwait)	Hira Lal; Mohammed Rashid Al-Foudari	4; 6	4; 6
2	(Bangladesh) (Kuwait)	Shovon Jamaly; Adel Al-Shatti	4; 6	3; 6
3	(Bangladesh) (Kuwait)	Shovon Jamaly / Hira Lal; Khalid Al-Gharabally / Mohammad Ghareeb	6^{1} 7^{7}	4; 6

==== Bahrain vs. Kazakhstan ====
Bahrain
1
Khalifa International Tennis and Squash Complex, Doha, Qatar
26 March 1997

Kazakhstan
2

			1	2	3
1	(Bahrain) (Kazakhstan)	Esam Abdulaal; Alexey Kedryuk	6^{5} 7^{7}	4; 6
2	(Bahrain) (Kazakhstan)	Abdul-Rahman Shehab; Igor Chaldounov	6; 4	6; 2
3	(Bahrain) (Kazakhstan)	Esam Abdulaal / Nader Abdul-Aal; Igor Chaldounov / Alexey Kedryuk	5; 7	6; 4	5; 7

==== Bangladesh vs. Kazakhstan ====
Bangladesh
0
Khalifa International Tennis and Squash Complex, Doha, Qatar
27 March 1997

Kazakhstan
3

			1	2	3
1	(Bangladesh) (Kazakhstan)	Hira Lal; Alexey Kedryuk	2; 6	2; 6
2	(Bangladesh) (Kazakhstan)	Dilip Passia; Igor Chaldounov	6; 4	4; 6	2; 6
3	(Bangladesh) (Kazakhstan)	Shovon Jamaly / Dilip Passia; Yuriy Karlov / Alexey Kedryuk	2; 6	4; 6

==== Bahrain vs. Kuwait ====
Bahrain
1
Khalifa International Tennis and Squash Complex, Doha, Qatar
27 March 1997

Kuwait
2

			1	2	3
1	(Bahrain) (Kuwait)	Esam Abdulaal; Mohammad Ghareeb	6; 3	6; 0
2	(Bahrain) (Kuwait)	Abdul-Rahman Shehab; Adel Al-Shatti	2; 6	1; 6
3	(Bahrain) (Kuwait)	Esam Abdulaal / Nader Abdul-Aal; Khalid Al-Gharabally / Adel Al-Shatti	6; 3	5; 7	2; 6

==== Bangladesh vs. Bahrain ====
Bangladesh
1
Khalifa International Tennis and Squash Complex, Doha, Qatar
28 March 1997

Bahrain
2

			1	2	3
1	(Bangladesh) (Bahrain)	Tofazzal Hossain; Shehab Shehab	3; 6	1; 6
2	(Bangladesh) (Bahrain)	Dilip Passia; Abdul-Rahman Shehab	6; 2	7^{7} 6^{1}
3	(Bangladesh) (Bahrain)	Shovon Jamaly / Hira Lal; Nader Abdul-Aal / Abdul-Rahman Shehab	3; 6	3; 6

==== Kazakhstan vs. Kuwait ====
Kazakhstan
2
Khalifa International Tennis and Squash Complex, Doha, Qatar
28 March 1997

Kuwait
1

			1	2	3
1	(Kazakhstan) (Kuwait)	Alexey Kedryuk; Mohammed Rashid Al-Foudari	6; 2	6; 3
2	(Kazakhstan) (Kuwait)	Igor Chaldounov; Mohammad Ghareeb	1; 6	4; 6
3	(Kazakhstan) (Kuwait)	Igor Chaldounov / Alexey Kedryuk; Mohammed Rashid Al-Foudari / Khalid Al-Gharabally	6; 2	6; 3

=== Group B ===
==== Qatar vs. Malaysia ====
Qatar
2
Khalifa International Tennis and Squash Complex, Doha, Qatar
26 March 1997

Malaysia
1

			1	2	3
1	(Qatar) (Malaysia)	Nasser Al-Khelaifi; Vasuthevan Ortchuan	2; 6	6; 1	2; 6
2	(Qatar) (Malaysia)	Sultan Al-Alawi; Ramayah Ramachandran	2; 6	6; 3	6; 2
3	(Qatar) (Malaysia)	Sultan Al-Alawi / Nasser Al-Khelaifi; Ramayah Ramachandran / Abdul-Aziz Shazali	6; 2	6; 3

==== Pacific Oceania vs. Sri Lanka ====
Pacific Oceania
2
Khalifa International Tennis and Squash Complex, Doha, Qatar
26 March 1997

Sri Lanka
1

			1	2	3
1	(Pacific Oceania) (Sri Lanka)	Motuliki Kailahi; Rohan de Silva	3; 6	3; 6
2	(Pacific Oceania) (Sri Lanka)	Lency Tenai; Jayendra Wijeyesekera	4; 6	7^{7} 6^{2}	6; 1
3	(Pacific Oceania) (Sri Lanka)	Motuliki Kailahi / Lency Tenai; Rohan de Silva / Jayendra Wijeyesekera	7^{7} 6^{4}	3; 6	6; 3

==== Qatar vs. Sri Lanka ====
Qatar
2
Khalifa International Tennis and Squash Complex, Doha, Qatar
27 March 1997

Sri Lanka
1

			1	2	3
1	(Qatar) (Sri Lanka)	Nasser Al-Khelaifi; Rohan de Silva	6; 2	6^{5} 7^{7}	8; 6
2	(Qatar) (Sri Lanka)	Sultan Al-Alawi; Jayendra Wijeyesekera	7; 5	6; 1
3	(Qatar) (Sri Lanka)	Mohammed Ali Al-Saoud / Cesarito Diong; Rohan de Silva / Jayendra Wijeyesekera	2; 6	5; 7

==== Malaysia vs. Pacific Oceania ====
Malaysia
2
Khalifa International Tennis and Squash Complex, Doha, Qatar
27 March 1997

Pacific Oceania
1

			1	2	3
1	(Malaysia) (Pacific Oceania)	Vasuthevan Ortchuan; Motuliki Kailahi	6; 4	6; 3
2	(Malaysia) (Pacific Oceania)	Ramayah Ramachandran; Lency Tenai	6; 0	6; 1
3	(Malaysia) (Pacific Oceania)	Jamal Mulyadi / Ramayah Ramachandran; Motuliki Kailahi / Lency Tenai	6^{3} 7^{7}	6; 3	3; 6

==== Qatar vs. Pacific Oceania ====
Qatar
1
Khalifa International Tennis and Squash Complex, Doha, Qatar
28 March 1997

Pacific Oceania
2

			1	2	3
1	(Qatar) (Pacific Oceania)	Mohammed Ali Al-Saoud; Motuliki Kailahi	6; 4	2; 6	3; 6
2	(Qatar) (Pacific Oceania)	Sultan Al-Alawi; Lency Tenai	6; 1	6; 2
3	(Qatar) (Pacific Oceania)	Sultan Al-Alawi / Nasser Al-Khelaifi; Motuliki Kailahi / Lency Tenai	6; 4	4; 6	2; 6

==== Malaysia vs. Sri Lanka ====
Malaysia
0
Khalifa International Tennis and Squash Complex, Doha, Qatar
28 March 1997

Sri Lanka
3

			1	2	3
1	(Malaysia) (Sri Lanka)	Vasuthevan Ortchuan; Rohan de Silva	6^{1} 7^{7}	0; 6
2	(Malaysia) (Sri Lanka)	Ramayah Ramachandran; Jayendra Wijeyesekera	6^{6} 7^{8}	7; 5	4; 6
3	(Malaysia) (Sri Lanka)	Jamal Mulyadi / Ramayah Ramachandran; Rohan de Silva / Jayendra Wijeyesekera	3; 6	2; 6

== 1st to 4th place play-offs ==
=== Semifinals ===
==== Kazakhstan vs. Qatar ====
Kazakhstan
1
Khalifa International Tennis and Squash Complex, Doha, Qatar
29 March 1997

Qatar
2

			1	2	3
1	(Kazakhstan) (Qatar)	Alexey Kedryuk; Nasser Al-Khelaifi	6; 2	6; 2
2	(Kazakhstan) (Qatar)	Igor Chaldounov; Sultan Al-Alawi	0; 6	3; 6
3	(Kazakhstan) (Qatar)	Igor Chaldounov / Alexey Kedryuk; Sultan Al-Alawi / Cesarito Diong	2; 6	4; 6

==== Kuwait vs. Pacific Oceania ====
Kuwait
1
Khalifa International Tennis and Squash Complex, Doha, Qatar
29 March 1997

Pacific Oceania
2

			1	2	3
1	(Kuwait) (Pacific Oceania)	Mohammed Rashid Al-Foudari; Motuliki Kailahi	3; 6	2; 6
2	(Kuwait) (Pacific Oceania)	Adel Al-Shatti; Lency Tenai	2; 6	6; 2	6; 0
3	(Kuwait) (Pacific Oceania)	Khalid Al-Gharabally / Adel Al-Shatti; Motuliki Kailahi / Lency Tenai	6; 1	2; 6	2; 6

=== Final ===
==== Qatar vs. Pacific Oceania ====
Qatar
2
Khalifa International Tennis and Squash Complex, Doha, Qatar
30 March 1997

Pacific Oceania
1

			1	2	3
1	(Qatar) (Pacific Oceania)	Cesarito Diong; Motuliki Kailahi	6^{4} 7^{7}			retired
2	(Qatar) (Pacific Oceania)	Sultan Al-Alawi; Lency Tenai	6; 2	6; 3
3	(Qatar) (Pacific Oceania)	Sultan Al-Alawi / Nasser Al-Khelaifi; Motuliki Kailahi / Lency Tenai	2; 6	6; 3	6; 2

=== 3rd to 4th play-off ===
==== Kazakhstan vs. Kuwait ====
Kazakhstan
3
Khalifa International Tennis and Squash Complex, Doha, Qatar
30 March 1997

Kuwait
0

			1	2	3
1	(Kazakhstan) (Kuwait)	Alexey Kedryuk; Mohammed Rashid Al-Foudari	3; 0			retired
2	(Kazakhstan) (Kuwait)	Igor Chaldounov; Khalid Al-Gharabally	6; 3	0; 0		retired
3	(Kazakhstan) (Kuwait)	Igor Chaldounov / Alexey Kedryuk; Mohammed Rashid Al-Foudari / Khalid Al-Gharabally				w/o

== 5th to 8th place play-offs ==
=== 5th to 8th play-offs ===
==== Bahrain vs. Malaysia ====
Bahrain
1
Khalifa International Tennis and Squash Complex, Doha, Qatar
29 March 1997

Malaysia
2

			1	2	3
1	(Bahrain) (Malaysia)	Esam Abdulaal; Vasuthevan Ortchuan	7; 5	6; 3
2	(Bahrain) (Malaysia)	Abdul-Rahman Shehab; Ramayah Ramachandran	1; 6	0; 6
3	(Bahrain) (Malaysia)	Nader Abdul-Aal / Shehab Shehab; Jamal Mulyadi / Ramayah Ramachandran	0; 6	2; 6

==== Bangladesh vs. Sri Lanka ====
Bangladesh
1
Khalifa International Tennis and Squash Complex, Doha, Qatar
29 March 1997

Sri Lanka
2

			1	2	3
1	(Bangladesh) (Sri Lanka)	Dilip Passia; Rohan de Silva	7; 5	4; 6	1; 6
2	(Bangladesh) (Sri Lanka)	Shovon Jamaly; Jayendra Wijeyesekera	2; 6	6; 4	6; 2
3	(Bangladesh) (Sri Lanka)	Shovon Jamaly / Dilip Passia; Rohan de Silva / Jayendra Wijeyesekera	6; 3	4; 6	4; 6

=== 5th to 6th play-off ===
==== Malaysia vs. Sri Lanka ====
Malaysia
3
Khalifa International Tennis and Squash Complex, Doha, Qatar
30 March 1997

Sri Lanka
0

			1	2	3
1	(Malaysia) (Sri Lanka)	Vasuthevan Ortchuan; Lahiru Jayasuriya	6; 4	7^{7} 6^{3}
2	(Malaysia) (Sri Lanka)	Ramayah Ramachandran; Roshun Razik	6; 1	6; 1
3	(Malaysia) (Sri Lanka)	Jamal Mulyadi / Abdul-Aziz Shazali; Rohan de Silva / Jayendra Wijeyesekera	4; 6	6; 4	6; 2

=== 7th to 8th play-off ===
==== Bahrain vs. Bangladesh ====
Bahrain
2
Khalifa International Tennis and Squash Complex, Doha, Qatar
30 March 1997

Bangladesh
1

			1	2	3
1	(Bahrain) (Bangladesh)	Esam Abdulaal; Dilip Passia	6; 2	6; 1
2	(Bahrain) (Bangladesh)	Abdul-Rahman Shehab; Shovon Jamaly	1; 6	4; 6
3	(Bahrain) (Bangladesh)	Nader Abdul-Aal / Shehab Shehab; Shovon Jamaly / Dilip Passia	6; 2	1; 6	6; 4
