= 1993 Davis Cup Asia/Oceania Zone Group III =

International tennis competition

The Asia/Oceania Zone was one of the three zones of the regional Davis Cup competition in 1993.

In the Asia/Oceania Zone there were three different tiers, called groups, in which teams competed against each other to advance to the upper tier. Winners in Group III advanced to the Asia/Oceania Zone Group II in 1994. All other teams remained in Group III.

== Participating nations ==
- Bangladesh
- Bahrain
- Lebanon
- Qatar
- Saudi Arabia
- Singapore
- Syria
- United Arab Emirates

=== Draw ===
- Venue: Khalifa International Tennis and Squash Complex, Doha, Qatar
- Date: 19–25 April

	SIN	KSA	LIB	UAE	BHR	BAN	SYR	QAT	RR; W–L	Match; W–L	Set; W–L	Standings
Singapore		0–3	2–1	2–1	3–0	2–1	3–0	3–0	6–1	15–6 (71%)	32–18 (64%)	1
Saudi Arabia	3–0		2–1	2–1	2–1	1–2	2–1	3–0	6–1	15–6 (71%)	32–18 (64%)	2
Lebanon	1–2	1–2		2–1	1–2	2–1	3–0	3–0	4–3	13–8 (62%)	27–18 (60%)	3
United Arab Emirates	1–2	1–2	1–2		2–1	2–1	2–1	3–0	4–3	12–9 (57%)	26–19 (58%)	4
Bahrain	1–2	0–3	2–1	1–2		2–1	2–1	3–0	4–3	11–10 (52%)	27–21 (56%)	5
Bangladesh	2–1	1–2	1–2	1–2	1–2		3–0	3–0	3–4	12–9 (57%)	26–21 (55%)	6
Syria	1–2	0–3	0–3	1–2	1–2	0–3		2–1	1–6	5–16 (24%)	14–34 (29%)	7
Qatar	0–3	0–3	0–3	0–3	0–3	0–3	1–2		0–7	1–20 (5%)	5–40 (11%)	8

- Singapore and Saudi Arabia promoted to Group II in 1994.

== Results ==
=== Bangladesh vs. Bahrain ===
Bangladesh
1
Khalifa International Tennis and Squash Complex, Doha, Qatar
19 April 1993

Bahrain
2

			1	2	3
1	(Bangladesh) (Bahrain)	Faisal-Syed Haq; Esam Abdulaal	2; 6	4; 6
2	(Bangladesh) (Bahrain)	Hira Lal; Shehab Shehab	6; 2	6; 3
3	(Bangladesh) (Bahrain)	Faisal-Syed Haq / Moinuddin Walliullah; Esam Abdulaal / Nader Abdul-Aal	2; 6	4; 6

=== Saudi Arabia vs. Lebanon ===
Saudi Arabia
2
Khalifa International Tennis and Squash Complex, Doha, Qatar
19 April 1993

Lebanon
1

			1	2	3
1	(Saudi Arabia) (Lebanon)	Bader Mohammed Almuqail; Hussein Badreddine	6; 2	6; 4
2	(Saudi Arabia) (Lebanon)	Othman Al-Anazi; Karim El Khoury	1; 6	5; 7
3	(Saudi Arabia) (Lebanon)	Othman Al-Anazi / Bader Mohammed Almuqail; Karim El Khoury / Fadi Haddad	6; 2	6; 4

=== Qatar vs. United Arab Emirates ===
Qatar
0
Khalifa International Tennis and Squash Complex, Doha, Qatar
19 April 1993

United Arab Emirates
3

			1	2	3
1	(Qatar) (United Arab Emirates)	Mohammed Ali Al-Saoud; Manuel Gayon	0; 6	1; 6
2	(Qatar) (United Arab Emirates)	Nasser Al-Khelaifi; Salim Dasmal	3; 6	3; 6
3	(Qatar) (United Arab Emirates)	Sultan Al-Alawi / Mohammed Ali Al-Saoud; Saeed Hasher Al-Maktoum / Manuel Gayon	3; 6	4; 6

=== Singapore vs. Syria ===
Singapore
3
Khalifa International Tennis and Squash Complex, Doha, Qatar
19 April 1993

Syria
0

			1	2	3
1	(Singapore) (Syria)	Mark Choy; Shafik Diab	7^{8} 6^{6}	6; 2
2	(Singapore) (Syria)	Chen Chee-yen; Kahtan Malki	6; 2	6; 2
3	(Singapore) (Syria)	Choo Wei-pin / Art Hobbs; Ahmed Diab / Shafik Diab	6; 2	6; 2

=== Bangladesh vs. Singapore ===
Bangladesh
1
Khalifa International Tennis and Squash Complex, Doha, Qatar
20 April 1993

Singapore
2

			1	2	3
1	(Bangladesh) (Singapore)	Shovon Jamaly; Mark Choy	6; 3	4; 6	5; 7
2	(Bangladesh) (Singapore)	Hira Lal; Chen Chee-yen	6; 2	7; 5
3	(Bangladesh) (Singapore)	Faisal-Syed Haq / Shovon Jamaly; Choo Wei-pin / Art Hobbs	4; 6	7^{7} 6^{4}	4; 6

=== Bahrain vs. Syria ===
Bahrain
2
Khalifa International Tennis and Squash Complex, Doha, Qatar
20 April 1993

Syria
1

			1	2	3
1	(Bahrain) (Syria)	Esam Abdulaal; Abdul-Rahim Salim	6; 2	6; 4
2	(Bahrain) (Syria)	Shehab Shehab; Shafik Diab	0; 6	1; 6
3	(Bahrain) (Syria)	Esam Abdulaal / Nader Abdul-Aal; Ahmed Diab / Kahtan Malki	6; 1	6; 4

=== Lebanon vs. United Arab Emirates ===
Lebanon
2
Khalifa International Tennis and Squash Complex, Doha, Qatar
20 April 1993

United Arab Emirates
1

			1	2	3
1	(Lebanon) (United Arab Emirates)	Nicholas Kanaan; Manuel Gayon	1; 6	2; 6
2	(Lebanon) (United Arab Emirates)	Karim El Khoury; Salim Dasmal	6; 3	6; 3
3	(Lebanon) (United Arab Emirates)	Hussein Badreddine / Karim El Khoury; Salim Dasmal / Manuel Gayon	7^{7} 6^{3}	7^{7} 6^{2}

=== Qatar vs. Saudi Arabia ===
Qatar
0
Khalifa International Tennis and Squash Complex, Doha, Qatar
20 April 1993

Saudi Arabia
3

			1	2	3
1	(Qatar) (Saudi Arabia)	Mohammed Ali Al-Saoud; Bader Mohammed Almuqail	2; 6	1; 6
2	(Qatar) (Saudi Arabia)	Nasser Al-Khelaifi; Othman Al-Anazi	1; 6	3; 6
3	(Qatar) (Saudi Arabia)	Sultan Al-Alawi / Mohammed Ali Al-Saoud; Tawfik Al-Ibrahim / Bader Mohammed Almuqail	1; 6	4; 6

=== Bangladesh vs. United Arab Emirates ===
Bangladesh
1
Khalifa International Tennis and Squash Complex, Doha, Qatar
21 April 1993

United Arab Emirates
2

			1	2	3
1	(Bangladesh) (United Arab Emirates)	Shovon Jamaly; Manuel Gayon	2; 6	1; 6
2	(Bangladesh) (United Arab Emirates)	Hira Lal; Salim Dasmal	6; 1	6; 3
3	(Bangladesh) (United Arab Emirates)	Faisal-Syed Haq / Hira Lal; Salim Dasmal / Manuel Gayon	2; 6	4; 6

=== Bahrain vs. Saudi Arabia ===
Bahrain
1
Khalifa International Tennis and Squash Complex, Doha, Qatar
21 April 1993

Saudi Arabia
2

			1	2	3
1	(Bahrain) (Saudi Arabia)	Hesham Malalla; Bader Mohammed Almuqail	7; 5	2; 6	4; 6
2	(Bahrain) (Saudi Arabia)	Esam Abdulaal; Othman Al-Anazi	6; 2	6; 2
3	(Bahrain) (Saudi Arabia)	Esam Abdulaal / Nader Abdul-Aal; Othman Al-Anazi / Bader Mohammed Almuqail	6; 4	1; 6	3; 6

=== Lebanon vs. Singapore ===
Lebanon
1
Khalifa International Tennis and Squash Complex, Doha, Qatar
21 April 1993

Singapore
2

			1	2	3
1	(Lebanon) (Singapore)	Hussein Badreddine; Mark Choy	6; 4	6; 1
2	(Lebanon) (Singapore)	Karim El Khoury; Chen Chee-yen	5; 7	1; 6
3	(Lebanon) (Singapore)	Hussein Badreddine / Karim El Khoury; Choo Wei-pin / Art Hobbs	6; 4	2; 6	3; 6

=== Qatar vs. Syria ===
Qatar
1
Khalifa International Tennis and Squash Complex, Doha, Qatar
21 April 1993

Syria
2

			1	2	3
1	(Qatar) (Syria)	Aymen-Azmy Galal; Shafik Diab	6; 3	4; 6	7; 5
2	(Qatar) (Syria)	Nasser Al-Khelaifi; Kahtan Malki	6^{4} 7^{7}	2; 6
3	(Qatar) (Syria)	Nasser Al-Khelaifi / Aymen-Azmy Galal; Ahmed Diab / Shafik Diab	6; 2	6^{5} 7^{7}	4; 6

=== Bangladesh vs. Syria ===
Bangladesh
3
Khalifa International Tennis and Squash Complex, Doha, Qatar
22 April 1993

Syria
0

			1	2	3
1	(Bangladesh) (Syria)	Moinuddin Walliullah; Shafik Diab	6; 2	6^{2} 7^{7}	6; 3
2	(Bangladesh) (Syria)	Hira Lal; Ahmed Diab	6; 4	7^{7} 6^{1}
3	(Bangladesh) (Syria)	Shovon Jamaly / Hira Lal; Kahtan Malki / Abdul-Rahim Salim	6; 1	6; 2

=== Bahrain vs. Singapore ===
Bahrain
0
Khalifa International Tennis and Squash Complex, Doha, Qatar
22 April 1993

Singapore
3

			1	2	3
1	(Bahrain) (Singapore)	Hesham Malalla; Mark Choy	4; 6	6; 2	0; 6
2	(Bahrain) (Singapore)	Esam Abdulaal; Chen Chee-yen	6^{5} 7^{7}	4; 6
3	(Bahrain) (Singapore)	Nader Abdul-Aal / Shehab Shehab; Choo Wei-pin / Art Hobbs	6; 4	3; 6	5; 7

=== Lebanon vs. Qatar ===
Lebanon
3
Khalifa International Tennis and Squash Complex, Doha, Qatar
22 April 1993

Qatar
0

			1	2	3
1	(Lebanon) (Qatar)	Nicholas Kanaan; Aymen-Azmy Galal	7^{7} 6^{4}	6^{1} 7^{7}	6; 6
2	(Lebanon) (Qatar)	Hussein Badreddine; Nasser Al-Khelaifi	6; 0	6; 2
3	(Lebanon) (Qatar)	Fadi Haddad / Nicholas Kanaan; Sultan Al-Alawi / Mohammed Ali Al-Saoud	6; 1	6; 2

=== Saudi Arabia vs. United Arab Emirates ===
Saudi Arabia
2
Khalifa International Tennis and Squash Complex, Doha, Qatar
22 April 1993

United Arab Emirates
1

			1	2	3
1	(Saudi Arabia) (United Arab Emirates)	Bader Mohammed Almuqail; Mohammed Saeed Al-Merri	6; 2	6; 3
2	(Saudi Arabia) (United Arab Emirates)	Othman Al-Anazi; Manuel Gayon	4; 6	0; 6
3	(Saudi Arabia) (United Arab Emirates)	Othman Al-Anazi / Bader Mohammed Almuqail; Salim Dasmal / Manuel Gayon	3; 6	6; 4	6; 2

=== Bangladesh vs. Qatar ===
Bangladesh
3
Khalifa International Tennis and Squash Complex, Doha, Qatar
23 April 1993

Qatar
0

			1	2	3
1	(Bangladesh) (Qatar)	Moinuddin Walliullah; Aymen-Azmy Galal	6; 0	6; 1
2	(Bangladesh) (Qatar)	Hira Lal; Sultan Al-Alawi	6; 2	6; 1
3	(Bangladesh) (Qatar)	Shovon Jamaly / Hira Lal; Sultan Al-Alawi / Nasser Al-Khelaifi	6; 2	6; 2

=== Bahrain vs. Lebanon ===
Bahrain
2
Khalifa International Tennis and Squash Complex, Doha, Qatar
23 April 1993

Lebanon
1

			1	2	3
1	(Bahrain) (Lebanon)	Esam Abdulaal; Hussein Badreddine	6; 4	6; 4
2	(Bahrain) (Lebanon)	Shehab Shehab; Karim El Khoury	4; 6	4; 6
3	(Bahrain) (Lebanon)	Esam Abdulaal / Nader Abdul-Aal; Hussein Badreddine / Karim El Khoury	7; 5	6; 3

=== Saudi Arabia vs. Singapore ===
Saudi Arabia
3
Khalifa International Tennis and Squash Complex, Doha, Qatar
23 April 1993

Singapore
0

			1	2	3
1	(Saudi Arabia) (Singapore)	Bader Mohammed Almuqail; Mark Choy	3; 6	6; 2	7; 5
2	(Saudi Arabia) (Singapore)	Othman Al-Anazi; Chen Chee-yen	6; 2	4; 6	7; 5
3	(Saudi Arabia) (Singapore)	Tawfik Al-Ibrahim / Bader Mohammed Almuqail; Choo Wei-pin / Art Hobbs	6; 3	7^{7} 6^{4}

=== Syria vs. United Arab Emirates ===
Syria
1
Khalifa International Tennis and Squash Complex, Doha, Qatar
23 April 1993

United Arab Emirates
2

			1	2	3
1	(Syria) (United Arab Emirates)	Shafik Diab; Saeed Hasher Al-Maktoum	6; 0	6; 2
2	(Syria) (United Arab Emirates)	Kahtan Malki; Manuel Gayon	6^{2} 7^{7}	0; 6
3	(Syria) (United Arab Emirates)	Ahmed Diab / Shafik Diab; Salim Dasmal / Manuel Gayon	5; 7	0; 6

=== Bangladesh vs. Saudi Arabia ===
Bangladesh
2
Khalifa International Tennis and Squash Complex, Doha, Qatar
24 April 1993

Saudi Arabia
1

			1	2	3
1	(Bangladesh) (Saudi Arabia)	Moinuddin Walliullah; Bader Mohammed Almuqail	4; 6	4; 6
2	(Bangladesh) (Saudi Arabia)	Hira Lal; Othman Al-Anazi	6; 2	6; 2
3	(Bangladesh) (Saudi Arabia)	Shovon Jamaly / Hira Lal; Tawfik Al-Ibrahim / Bader Mohammed Almuqail	3; 6	6; 1	6; 4

=== Bahrain vs. United Arab Emirates ===
Bahrain
1
Khalifa International Tennis and Squash Complex, Doha, Qatar
24 April 1993

United Arab Emirates
2

			1	2	3
1	(Bahrain) (United Arab Emirates)	Esam Abdulaal; Manuel Gayon	7^{7} 6^{1}	6; 4
2	(Bahrain) (United Arab Emirates)	Shehab Shehab; Salim Dasmal	1; 6	6; 3	3; 6
3	(Bahrain) (United Arab Emirates)	Esam Abdulaal / Nader Abdul-Aal; Salim Dasmal / Manuel Gayon	6^{6} 7^{8}	2; 6

=== Lebanon vs. Syria ===
Lebanon
3
Khalifa International Tennis and Squash Complex, Doha, Qatar
24 April 1993

Syria
0

			1	2	3
1	(Lebanon) (Syria)	Fadi Haddad; Shafik Diab	6; 4	3; 6	6; 3
2	(Lebanon) (Syria)	Karim El Khoury; Ahmed Diab	6; 0	6; 0
3	(Lebanon) (Syria)	Karim El Khoury / Nicholas Kanaan; Shafik Diab / Kahtan Malki	6; 2	6; 2

=== Qatar vs. Singapore ===
Qatar
0
Khalifa International Tennis and Squash Complex, Doha, Qatar
24 April 1993

Singapore
3

			1	2	3
1	(Qatar) (Singapore)	Nasser Al-Khelaifi; Mark Choy	2; 6	0; 6
2	(Qatar) (Singapore)	Sultan Al-Alawi; Chen Chee-yen	4; 6	1; 6
3	(Qatar) (Singapore)	Sultan Al-Alawi / Aymen-Azmy Galal; Choo Wei-pin / Art Hobbs	2; 6	2; 6

=== Bangladesh vs. Lebanon ===
Bangladesh
1
Khalifa International Tennis and Squash Complex, Doha, Qatar
25 April 1993

Lebanon
2

			1	2	3
1	(Bangladesh) (Lebanon)	Moinuddin Walliullah; Fadi Haddad	4; 6	6; 2	6; 4
2	(Bangladesh) (Lebanon)	Hira Lal; Karim El Khoury	3; 6	4; 6
3	(Bangladesh) (Lebanon)	Shovon Jamaly / Hira Lal; Hussein Badreddine / Fadi Haddad	2; 6	0; 6

=== Bahrain vs. Qatar ===
Bahrain
3
Khalifa International Tennis and Squash Complex, Doha, Qatar
25 April 1993

Qatar
0

			1	2	3
1	(Bahrain) (Qatar)	Esam Abdulaal; Aymen-Azmy Galal	6; 2	6; 3
2	(Bahrain) (Qatar)	Shehab Shehab; Nasser Al-Khelaifi	6^{3} 7^{7}	6; 4	8; 6
3	(Bahrain) (Qatar)	Nader Abdul-Aal / Hesham Malalla; Sultan Al-Alawi / Mohammed Ali Al-Saoud	7; 5	6; 1

=== Saudi Arabia vs. Syria ===
Saudi Arabia
2
Khalifa International Tennis and Squash Complex, Doha, Qatar
25 April 1993

Syria
1

			1	2	3
1	(Saudi Arabia) (Syria)	Bader Mohammed Almuqail; Shafik Diab	6; 3	6; 3
2	(Saudi Arabia) (Syria)	Othman Al-Anazi; Kahtan Malki	6; 2	3; 6	4; 6
3	(Saudi Arabia) (Syria)	Othman Al-Anazi / Bader Mohammed Almuqail; Ahmed Diab / Shafik Diab	4; 6	7; 5	6; 2

=== Singapore vs. United Arab Emirates ===
Singapore
2
Khalifa International Tennis and Squash Complex, Doha, Qatar
25 April 1993

United Arab Emirates
1

			1	2	3
1	(Singapore) (United Arab Emirates)	Mark Choy; Manuel Gayon	1; 6	6^{5} 7^{7}
2	(Singapore) (United Arab Emirates)	Chen Chee-yen; Salim Dasmal	6; 1	6; 1
3	(Singapore) (United Arab Emirates)	Chen Chee-yen / Choo Wei-pin; Salim Dasmal / Manuel Gayon	6; 3	4; 6	6; 1
