= 1998 Davis Cup Asia/Oceania Zone Group III =

International tennis competition

The Asia/Oceania Zone was one of the three zones of the regional Davis Cup competition in 1998.

In the Asia/Oceania Zone there were four different tiers, called groups, in which teams competed against each other to advance to the upper tier. The top two teams in Group III advanced to the Asia/Oceania Zone Group II in 1999, whereas the bottom two teams were relegated to the Asia/Oceania Zone Group IV in 1999.

== Participating nations ==
- Kazakhstan
- Kuwait
- Malaysia
- Saudi Arabia
- Singapore
- Sri Lanka
- Syria
- Tajikistan

=== Draw ===
- Venue: National Centre, Kuala Lumpur, Malaysia
- Date: 15–19 April

Group A

	KAZ	SRI	SYR	SIN	RR; W–L	Match; W–L	Set; W–L	Standings
Kazakhstan		3–0	3–0	3–0	3–0	9–0 (100%)	18–2 (90%)	1
Sri Lanka	0–3		2–1	3–0	2–1	5–4 (56%)	10–11 (48%)	2
Syria	0–3	1–2		2–1	1–2	3–6 (33%)	9–12 (43%)	3
Singapore	0–3	0–3	1–2		0–3	1–8 (11%)	4–16 (20%)	4

Group B

	MAS	TJK	KSA	KUW	RR; W–L	Match; W–L	Set; W–L	Standings
Malaysia		1–2	2–1	2–1	2–1	5–4 (56%)	11–6 (65%)	1
Tajikistan	2–1		1–2	2–1	2–1	5–4 (56%)	10–8 (56%)	2
Saudi Arabia	1–2	2–1		2–1	2–1	5–4 (56%)	10–10 (50%)	3
Kuwait	1–2	1–2	1–2		0–3	3–6 (33%)	5–12 (29%)	4

1st to 4th place play-offs

3rd-4th Play-off
B2	Tajikistan	3
B1	Malaysia	0

Semifinals
A1	Kazakhstan	3
B2	Tajikistan	0
A2	Sri Lanka	2
B1	Malaysia	1

Final
A1	Kazakhstan	3
A2	Sri Lanka	0

5th to 8th place play-offs

7th-8th Play-off
B4	Kuwait	1
A4	Singapore	2

5th-8th Play-offs
A3	Syria	2
B4	Kuwait	1
A4	Singapore	1
B3	Saudi Arabia	2

5th-6th Play-off
A3	Syria	3
B3	Saudi Arabia	0

=== Final standings ===
Rank	Team
1	Kazakhstan
2	Sri Lanka
3	Tajikistan
4	Malaysia
5	Syria
6	Saudi Arabia
7	Singapore
8	Kuwait

- Kazakhstan and Sri Lanka promoted to Group II in 1999.
- Singapore and Kuwait relegated to Group IV in 1999.

== Round robin ==
=== Group A ===
==== Kazakhstan vs. Sri Lanka ====
Kazakhstan
3
National Centre, Kuala Lumpur, Malaysia
15 April 1998

Sri Lanka
0

			1	2	3
1	(Kazakhstan) (Sri Lanka)	Pavel Baranov; Rohan de Silva	6; 4	6; 4
2	(Kazakhstan) (Sri Lanka)	Alexey Kedryuk; Jayendra Wijeyesekera	6; 3	6; 2
3	(Kazakhstan) (Sri Lanka)	Pavel Baranov / Igor Chaldounov; Rajeev Rajapakse / Samitha Ranaweera	6; 4	6; 4

==== Singapore vs. Syria ====
Singapore
1
National Centre, Kuala Lumpur, Malaysia
15 April 1998

Syria
2

			1	2	3
1	(Singapore) (Syria)	Lim Yang-tat; Rabi Bouhassoun	3; 6	2; 6
2	(Singapore) (Syria)	Lam Ju-min; Samir Saadeldin	1; 6	2; 6
3	(Singapore) (Syria)	Jensen Hiu / Yiu Leng-kar; Lays Salim / Jehad Sheet	6; 2	6; 3

==== Kazakhstan vs. Singapore ====
Kazakhstan
3
National Centre, Kuala Lumpur, Malaysia
16 April 1998

Singapore
0

			1	2	3
1	(Kazakhstan) (Singapore)	Pavel Baranov; Jensen Hiu	6; 0	5; 7	6; 4
2	(Kazakhstan) (Singapore)	Alexey Kedryuk; Lim Yang-tat	6; 3	6; 3
3	(Kazakhstan) (Singapore)	Pavel Baranov / Alexey Kedryuk; Lam Ju-min / Lim Yang-tat	6; 2	6; 4

==== Sri Lanka vs. Syria ====
Sri Lanka
2
National Centre, Kuala Lumpur, Malaysia
16 April 1998

Syria
1

			1	2	3
1	(Sri Lanka) (Syria)	Rohan de Silva; Rabi Bouhassoun	3; 6	4; 6
2	(Sri Lanka) (Syria)	Jayendra Wijeyesekera; Samir Saadeldin	4; 6	6; 1	6; 0
3	(Sri Lanka) (Syria)	Rohan de Silva / Jayendra Wijeyesekera; Rabi Bouhassoun / Samir Saadeldin	5; 7	6; 2	6; 1

==== Kazakhstan vs. Syria ====
Kazakhstan
3
National Centre, Kuala Lumpur, Malaysia
17 April 1998

Syria
0

			1	2	3
1	(Kazakhstan) (Syria)	Pavel Baranov; Rabi Bouhassoun	6^{4} 7^{7}	6; 2	6; 3
2	(Kazakhstan) (Syria)	Alexey Kedryuk; Samir Saadeldin	6; 0	6; 0
3	(Kazakhstan) (Syria)	Igor Chaldounov / Alexey Kedryuk; Lays Salim / Jehad Sheet	6; 2	6; 0

==== Singapore vs. Sri Lanka ====
Singapore
0
National Centre, Kuala Lumpur, Malaysia
17 April 1998

Sri Lanka
3

			1	2	3
1	(Singapore) (Sri Lanka)	Lim Yang-tat; Rohan de Silva	1; 6	6; 3	2; 6
2	(Singapore) (Sri Lanka)	Yiu Leng-kar; Jayendra Wijeyesekera	0; 6	1; 6
3	(Singapore) (Sri Lanka)	Jensen Hiu / Yiu Leng-kar; Rajeev Rajapakse / Samitha Ranaweera	2; 6	5; 7

=== Group B ===
==== Malaysia vs. Kuwait ====
Malaysia
2
National Centre, Kuala Lumpur, Malaysia
15 April 1998

Kuwait
1

			1	2	3
1	(Malaysia) (Kuwait)	Ramayah Ramachandran; Mohammad Ghareeb	5; 4			retired
2	(Malaysia) (Kuwait)	Selvam Veerasingam; Adel Al-Shatti	7; 5	7^{7} 6^{1}
3	(Malaysia) (Kuwait)	Vasuthevan Ortchuan / Selvam Veerasingam; Adel Al-Shatti / Mohammad Ghareeb	6; 1	6; 3

==== Saudi Arabia vs. Tajikistan ====
Saudi Arabia
2
National Centre, Kuala Lumpur, Malaysia
15 April 1998

Tajikistan
1

			1	2	3
1	(Saudi Arabia) (Tajikistan)	Bader Mohammed Almuqail; Sergey Makashin	6; 3	6; 2
2	(Saudi Arabia) (Tajikistan)	Othman Al-Anazi; Mansur Yakhyaev	2; 6	3; 6
3	(Saudi Arabia) (Tajikistan)	Othman Al-Anazi / Bader Mohammed Almuqail; Bakhrullo Radjabaliev / Mansur Yakhyaev	6; 4	6; 0

==== Malaysia vs. Saudi Arabia ====
Malaysia
2
National Centre, Kuala Lumpur, Malaysia
16 April 1998

Saudi Arabia
1

			1	2	3
1	(Malaysia) (Saudi Arabia)	Vasuthevan Ortchuan; Bader Mohammed Almuqail	6; 4	3; 6	2; 6
2	(Malaysia) (Saudi Arabia)	Selvam Veerasingam; Othman Al-Anazi	6; 2	6; 4
3	(Malaysia) (Saudi Arabia)	Vasuthevan Ortchuan / Selvam Veerasingam; Othman Al-Anazi / Bader Mohammed Almuqail	6; 4	6; 3

==== Kuwait vs. Tajikistan ====
Kuwait
1
National Centre, Kuala Lumpur, Malaysia
16 April 1998

Tajikistan
2

			1	2	3
1	(Kuwait) (Tajikistan)	Mohammad Ghareeb; Sergey Makashin	6; 3	6; 3
2	(Kuwait) (Tajikistan)	Adel Al-Shatti; Mansur Yakhyaev	2; 6	3; 6
3	(Kuwait) (Tajikistan)	Adel Al-Shatti / Mohammad Ghareeb; Sergey Makashin / Mansur Yakhyaev	4; 6	4; 6

==== Malaysia vs. Tajikistan ====
Malaysia
1
National Centre, Kuala Lumpur, Malaysia
17 April 1998

Tajikistan
2

			1	2	3
1	(Malaysia) (Tajikistan)	Abdul-Aziz Shazali; Sergey Makashin	1; 6	1; 6
2	(Malaysia) (Tajikistan)	Selvam Veerasingam; Mansur Yakhyaev	6^{6} 7^{8}	6^{13} 7^{15}
3	(Malaysia) (Tajikistan)	Vasuthevan Ortchuan / Selvam Veerasingam; Sergey Makashin / Mansur Yakhyaev	7^{7} 6^{2}	6; 1

==== Saudi Arabia vs. Kuwait ====
Saudi Arabia
2
National Centre, Kuala Lumpur, Malaysia
17 April 1998

Kuwait
1

			1	2	3
1	(Saudi Arabia) (Kuwait)	Bader Mohammed Almuqail; Hussain Al-Ghareeb	6; 3	4; 6	6; 2
2	(Saudi Arabia) (Kuwait)	Othman Al-Anazi; Mohammad Ghareeb	3; 6	4; 6
3	(Saudi Arabia) (Kuwait)	Bader Mohammed Almuqail / Farah Al-Somali; Mohammad Ghareeb / Adel Al-Shatti	7^{7} 6^{4}	6; 2

== 1st to 4th place play-offs ==
=== Semifinals ===
==== Kazakhstan vs. Tajikistan ====
Kazakhstan
3
National Centre, Kuala Lumpur, Malaysia
18 April 1998

Tajikistan
0

			1	2	3
1	(Kazakhstan) (Tajikistan)	Pavel Baranov; Sergey Makashin	6; 2	6; 4
2	(Kazakhstan) (Tajikistan)	Alexey Kedryuk; Mansur Yakhyaev	7^{7} 6^{2}	6; 1
3	(Kazakhstan) (Tajikistan)	Pavel Baranov / Igor Chaldounov; Roustam Amonov / Sergey Makashin	6; 2	6; 3

==== Sri Lanka vs. Malaysia ====
Sri Lanka
2
National Centre, Kuala Lumpur, Malaysia
18 April 1998

Malaysia
1

			1	2	3
1	(Sri Lanka) (Malaysia)	Rohan de Silva; Vasuthevan Ortchuan	6; 2	6; 3
2	(Sri Lanka) (Malaysia)	Jayendra Wijeyesekera; Selvam Veerasingam	5; 7	1; 6
3	(Sri Lanka) (Malaysia)	Rohan de Silva / Jayendra Wijeyesekera; Ramayah Ramachandran / Selvam Veerasingam	0; 6	7; 5	6; 3

=== Final ===
==== Kazakhstan vs. Sri Lanka ====
Kazakhstan
3
National Centre, Kuala Lumpur, Malaysia
19 April 1998

Sri Lanka
0

			1	2	3
1	(Kazakhstan) (Sri Lanka)	Pavel Baranov; Rajeev Rajapakse	6; 3	6; 1
2	(Kazakhstan) (Sri Lanka)	Alexey Kedryuk; Samitha Ranaweera	6; 3	6; 3
3	(Kazakhstan) (Sri Lanka)	Alexey Kedryuk / Igor Chaldounov; Rajeev Rajapakse / Samitha Ranaweera	7; 5	6; 0

=== 3rd to 4th play-off ===
==== Tajikistan vs. Malaysia ====
Tajikistan
3
National Centre, Kuala Lumpur, Malaysia
19 April 1998

Malaysia
0

			1	2	3
1	(Tajikistan) (Malaysia)	Sergey Makashin; Abdul-Aziz Shazali	6; 4	6; 1
2	(Tajikistan) (Malaysia)	Mansur Yakhyaev; Vasuthevan Ortchuan	6; 1	6; 3
3	(Tajikistan) (Malaysia)	Sergey Makashin / Mansur Yakhyaev; Vasuthevan Ortchuan / Abdul-Aziz Shazali	7^{7} 6^{4}	6; 2

== 5th to 8th place play-offs ==
=== 5th to 8th play-offs ===
==== Syria vs. Kuwait ====
Syria
2
National Centre, Kuala Lumpur, Malaysia
18 April 1998

Kuwait
1

			1	2	3
1	(Syria) (Kuwait)	Rabi Bouhassoun; Mohammad Ghareeb	6; 4	6; 4
2	(Syria) (Kuwait)	Samir Saadeldin; Adel Al-Shatti	6; 3	6; 1
3	(Syria) (Kuwait)	Lays Salim / Jehad Sheet; Hussain Al-Ghareeb / Ali Hayat	6^{8} 7^{10}	3; 6

==== Saudi Arabia vs. Singapore ====
Saudi Arabia
2
National Centre, Kuala Lumpur, Malaysia
18 April 1998

Singapore
1

			1	2	3
1	(Saudi Arabia) (Singapore)	Bader Mohammed Almuqail; Jensen Hiu	6; 0	6; 2
2	(Saudi Arabia) (Singapore)	Othman Al-Anazi; Lim Yang-tat	3; 6	3; 6
3	(Saudi Arabia) (Singapore)	Bader Mohammed Almuqail / Farah Al-Somali; Lam Ju-min / Lim Yang-tat	7^{7} 6^{3}	6; 2

=== 5th to 6th play-off ===
==== Syria vs. Saudi Arabia ====
Syria
3
National Centre, Kuala Lumpur, Malaysia
19 April 1998

Saudi Arabia
0

			1	2	3
1	(Syria) (Saudi Arabia)	Rabi Bouhassoun; Farah Al-Somali	6; 3	6; 2
2	(Syria) (Saudi Arabia)	Samir Saadeldin; Tawfiq Moafa	6; 2	6; 0
3	(Syria) (Saudi Arabia)	Lays Salim / Jehad Sheet; Farah Al-Somali / Tawfiq Moafa	6; 3	6; 3

=== 7th to 8th play-off ===
==== Kuwait vs. Singapore ====
Kuwait
1
National Centre, Kuala Lumpur, Malaysia
19 April 1998

Singapore
2

			1	2	3
1	(Kuwait) (Singapore)	Ali Hayat; Jensen Hiu	2; 6	2; 6
2	(Kuwait) (Singapore)	Hussain Al-Ghareeb; Yiu Leng-kar	2; 6	6; 3	6; 4
3	(Kuwait) (Singapore)	Hussain Al-Ghareeb / Ali Hayat; Jensen Hiu / Yiu Leng-kar	4; 6	1; 6
