= 2000 Davis Cup Asia/Oceania Zone Group III =

International tennis competition

The Asia/Oceania Zone was one of the three zones of the regional Davis Cup competition in 2000.

In the Asia/Oceania Zone there were four different tiers, called groups, in which teams competed against each other to advance to the upper tier. The top two teams in Group III advanced to the Asia/Oceania Zone Group II in 2001, whereas the bottom two teams were relegated to the Asia/Oceania Zone Group IV in 2001.

== Participating nations ==
- Bangladesh
- Kuwait
- Pacific Oceania
- Qatar
- Singapore
- Sri Lanka
- Syria
- Tajikistan

=== Draw ===
- Venue: National Tennis Centre, Colombo, Sri Lanka
- Date: 9–13 February

Group A

	QAT	KUW	BAN	POC	RR; W–L	Match; W–L	Set; W–L	Standings
Qatar		3–0	1–2	3–0	2–1	7–2 (78%)	13–4 (76%)	1
Kuwait	0–3		3–0	2–1	2–1	5–4 (56%)	12–11 (52%)	2
Bangladesh	2–1	0–3		2–1	2–1	4–5 (44%)	9–12 (43%)	3
Pacific Oceania	0–3	1–2	1–2		0–3	2–7 (22%)	8–15 (35%)	4

Group B

	SRI	SYR	TJK	SIN	RR; W–L	Match; W–L	Set; W–L	Standings
Sri Lanka		2–1	2–1	3–0	3–0	7–2 (78%)	14–5 (74%)	1
Syria	1–2		2–1	2–1	2–1	5–4 (56%)	10–10 (50%)	2
Tajikistan	1–2	1–2		2–1	1–2	4–5 (44%)	10–10 (50%)	3
Singapore	0–3	1–2	1–2		0–3	2–7 (22%)	5–14 (26%)	4

1st to 4th place play-offs

3rd-4th Play-off
A1	Qatar	1
B1	Sri Lanka	2

Semifinals
A1	Qatar	0
B2	Syria	2
A2	Kuwait	2
B1	Sri Lanka	1

Final
B2	Syria	2
A2	Kuwait	1

5th to 8th place play-offs

7th-8th Play-off
A3	Bangladesh	2
A4	Pacific Oceania	1

5th-8th Play-offs
A3	Bangladesh	1
B4	Singapore	2
A4	Pacific Oceania	0
B3	Tajikistan	2

5th-6th Play-off
B4	Singapore	1
B3	Tajikistan	2

=== Final standings ===
Rank	Team
1	Syria
2	Kuwait
3	Sri Lanka
4	Qatar
5	Tajikistan
6	Singapore
7	Bangladesh
8	Pacific Oceania

- Syria and Kuwait promoted to Group II in 2001.
- Bangladesh and Pacific Oceania relegated to Group IV in 2001.

== Round robin ==
=== Group A ===
==== Qatar vs. Pacific Oceania ====
Qatar
3
National Tennis Centre, Colombo, Sri Lanka
9 February 2000

Pacific Oceania
0

			1	2	3
1	(Qatar) (Pacific Oceania)	Nasser Al-Khelaifi; Brett Baudinet	6; 4	7; 5
2	(Qatar) (Pacific Oceania)	Sultan Al-Alawi; Lency Tenai	6; 3	7; 5
3	(Qatar) (Pacific Oceania)	Sultan Al-Alawi / Nasser Al-Khelaifi; Cyril Jacobe / Jerome Rovo	6; 4	7^{7} 6^{5}

==== Bangladesh vs. Kuwait ====
Bangladesh
0
National Tennis Centre, Colombo, Sri Lanka
9 February 2000

Kuwait
3

			1	2	3
1	(Bangladesh) (Kuwait)	Moinuddin Walliullah; Hamed Al-Solaiteen	6; 3	4; 6	0; 6
2	(Bangladesh) (Kuwait)	Nadeem-Kamran Khan; Mohammad Ghareeb	2; 6	2; 6
3	(Bangladesh) (Kuwait)	Dilip Passia / Moinuddin Walliullah; Mohammed Rashid Al-Foudari / Adel Al-Shatti	7; 5	2; 6	5; 7

==== Qatar vs. Kuwait ====
Qatar
3
National Tennis Centre, Colombo, Sri Lanka
10 February 2000

Kuwait
0

			1	2	3
1	(Qatar) (Kuwait)	Nasser Al-Khelaifi; Hamed Al-Solaiteen	6; 2	6; 4
2	(Qatar) (Kuwait)	Sultan Al-Alawi; Mohammad Ghareeb	6; 4	3; 1		retired
3	(Qatar) (Kuwait)	Sultan Al-Alawi / Mohammed Ali Al-Saoud; Mohammed Rashid Al-Foudari / Hamed Al-Solaiteen	7^{8} 6^{6}	6^{4} 7^{7}	6; 3

==== Bangladesh vs. Pacific Oceania ====
Bangladesh
2
National Tennis Centre, Colombo, Sri Lanka
10 February 2000

Pacific Oceania
1

			1	2	3
1	(Bangladesh) (Pacific Oceania)	Dilip Passia; Jerome Rovo	7^{7} 6^{5}	3; 6	6; 1
2	(Bangladesh) (Pacific Oceania)	Nadeem-Kamran Khan; Lency Tenai	6; 4	4; 6	6; 3
3	(Bangladesh) (Pacific Oceania)	Dilip Passia / Moinuddin Walliullah; Cyril Jacobe / Brett Baudinet	0; 6	1; 6

==== Qatar vs. Bangladesh ====
Qatar
1
National Tennis Centre, Colombo, Sri Lanka
11 February 2000

Bangladesh
2

			1	2	3
1	(Qatar) (Bangladesh)	Nasser Al-Khelaifi; Moinuddin Walliullah	4; 6	0; 3		retired
2	(Qatar) (Bangladesh)	Sultan Al-Alawi; Dilip Passia	6; 2	6; 1
3	(Qatar) (Bangladesh)	Sultan Al-Alawi / Mohammed Ali Al-Saoud; Dilip Passia / Moinuddin Walliullah	1; 6	6^{5} 7^{7}

==== Kuwait vs. Pacific Oceania ====
Kuwait
2
National Tennis Centre, Colombo, Sri Lanka
11 February 2000

Pacific Oceania
1

			1	2	3
1	(Kuwait) (Pacific Oceania)	Hamed Al-Solaiteen; Brett Baudinet	6; 1	4; 6	3; 6
2	(Kuwait) (Pacific Oceania)	Mohammad Ghareeb; Lency Tenai	3; 6	6; 1	6; 4
3	(Kuwait) (Pacific Oceania)	Mohammed Rashid Al-Foudari / Mohammad Ghareeb; Cyril Jacobe / Jerome Rovo	6^{3} 7^{7}	6; 1	6; 3

=== Group B ===
==== Singapore vs. Tajikistan ====
Singapore
1
National Tennis Centre, Colombo, Sri Lanka
9 February 2000

Tajikistan
2

			1	2	3
1	(Singapore) (Tajikistan)	Jensen Hiu; Sergey Makashin	5; 7	1; 6
2	(Singapore) (Tajikistan)	Yang Sian; Mansur Yakhyaev	2; 6	3; 6
3	(Singapore) (Tajikistan)	Kho Tung-yi / Seol Kyoung-sik; Sergey Makashin / Sergei Sedov	6; 1	6; 1

==== Sri Lanka vs. Singapore ====
Sri Lanka
3
National Tennis Centre, Colombo, Sri Lanka
9 February 2000

Singapore
0

			1	2	3
1	(Sri Lanka) (Singapore)	Jayendra Wijeyesekera; Kho Tung-yi	6; 2	6; 2
2	(Sri Lanka) (Singapore)	Rohan de Silva; Yang Sian	6; 3	6; 4
3	(Sri Lanka) (Singapore)	Asiri Iddamalgoda / Jayendra Wijeyesekera; Jensen Hiu / Kho Tung-yi	6; 3	6; 2

==== Syria vs. Tajikistan ====
Syria
2
National Tennis Centre, Colombo, Sri Lanka
9 February 2000

Tajikistan
1

			1	2	3
1	(Syria) (Tajikistan)	Samir Saadeldin; Sergey Makashin	7^{7} 6^{2}	6; 1
2	(Syria) (Tajikistan)	Rabi Bouhassoun; Mansur Yakhyaev	3; 6	7^{7} 6^{5}	6; 2
3	(Syria) (Tajikistan)	Rabi Bouhassoun / Lays Salim; Sergey Makashin / Mansur Yakhyaev	1; 6	2; 6

==== Sri Lanka vs. Tajikistan ====
Sri Lanka
2
National Tennis Centre, Colombo, Sri Lanka
10 February 2000

Tajikistan
1

			1	2	3
1	(Sri Lanka) (Tajikistan)	Jayendra Wijeyesekera; Sergey Makashin	6; 1	6; 0
2	(Sri Lanka) (Tajikistan)	Rohan de Silva; Mansur Yakhyaev	3; 6	3; 6
3	(Sri Lanka) (Tajikistan)	Rohan de Silva / Jayendra Wijeyesekera; Sergey Makashin / Mansur Yakhyaev	3; 6	6; 3	6; 2

==== Syria vs. Singapore ====
Syria
2
National Tennis Centre, Colombo, Sri Lanka
10 February 2000

Singapore
1

			1	2	3
1	(Syria) (Singapore)	Lays Salim; Jensen Hiu	6; 0	0; 6	6; 3
2	(Syria) (Singapore)	Rabi Bouhassoun; Yang Sian	6; 0	6; 0
3	(Syria) (Singapore)	Abdul-Rahim Salim / Lays Salim; Jensen Hiu / Yang Sian	5; 7	3; 6

==== Sri Lanka vs. Syria ====
Sri Lanka
2
National Tennis Centre, Colombo, Sri Lanka
11 February 2000

Syria
1

			1	2	3
1	(Sri Lanka) (Syria)	Jayendra Wijeyesekera; Samir Saadeldin	6; 3	6; 4
2	(Sri Lanka) (Syria)	Rohan de Silva; Rabi Bouhassoun	3; 6	4; 6
3	(Sri Lanka) (Syria)	Rohan de Silva / Jayendra Wijeyesekera; Abdul-Rahim Salim / Lays Salim	6; 2	7; 5

== 1st to 4th place play-offs ==
=== Semifinals ===
==== Syria vs. Qatar ====
Syria
2
National Tennis Centre, Colombo, Sri Lanka
12 February 2000

Qatar
0

			1	2	3
1	(Syria) (Qatar)	Samir Saadeldin; Nasser Al-Khelaifi	7^{7} 6^{2}	6; 3
2	(Syria) (Qatar)	Rabi Bouhassoun; Sultan Al-Alawi	6; 3	6; 1
3	(Syria) (Qatar)	Rabi Bouhassoun / Lays Salim; Sultan Al-Alawi / Mohammed Ali Al-Saoud				not played

==== Kuwait vs. Sri Lanka ====
Kuwait
2
National Tennis Centre, Colombo, Sri Lanka
12 February 2000

Sri Lanka
1

			1	2	3
1	(Kuwait) (Sri Lanka)	Hamed Al-Solaiteen; Jayendra Wijeyesekera	3; 6	7^{7} 6^{2}	2; 6
2	(Kuwait) (Sri Lanka)	Mohammad Ghareeb; Rohan de Silva	6; 1	6; 2
3	(Kuwait) (Sri Lanka)	Mohammed Rashid Al-Foudari / Mohammad Ghareeb; Rohan de Silva / Jayendra Wijeyesekera	6; 3	7^{7} 6^{4}

=== Final ===
==== Syria vs. Kuwait ====
Syria
2
National Tennis Centre, Colombo, Sri Lanka
13 February 2000

Kuwait
1

			1	2	3
1	(Syria) (Kuwait)	Lays Salim; Hamed Al-Solaiteen	6; 2	6; 1
2	(Syria) (Kuwait)	Rabi Bouhassoun; Mohammad Ghareeb	6; 4	7^{7} 6^{4}
3	(Syria) (Kuwait)	Abdul-Rahim Salim / Lays Salim; Mohammed Rashid Al-Foudari / Adel Al-Shatti	6^{4} 7^{7}	6; 2	4; 6

=== 3rd to 4th play-off ===
==== Sri Lanka vs. Qatar ====
Sri Lanka
2
National Tennis Centre, Colombo, Sri Lanka
13 February 2000

Qatar
1

			1	2	3
1	(Sri Lanka) (Qatar)	Niroshan Paramanathan; Nasser Al-Khelaifi	6^{8} 7^{10}	1; 6
2	(Sri Lanka) (Qatar)	Asiri Iddamalgoda; Sultan Al-Alawi	6; 4	6; 2
3	(Sri Lanka) (Qatar)	Rohan de Silva / Asiri Iddamalgoda; Sultan Al-Alawi / Nasser Al-Khelaifi	6; 4	7; 5

== 5th to 8th place play-offs ==
=== 5th to 8th play-offs ===
==== Singapore vs. Bangladesh ====
Singapore
2
National Tennis Centre, Colombo, Sri Lanka
12 February 2000

Bangladesh
1

			1	2	3
1	(Singapore) (Bangladesh)	Kho Tung-yi; Moinuddin Walliullah	3; 6	4; 6
2	(Singapore) (Bangladesh)	Yang Sian; Nadeem-Kamran Khan	6; 4	7^{7} 6^{2}
3	(Singapore) (Bangladesh)	Jensen Hiu / Seol Kyoung-sik; Dilip Passia / Moinuddin Walliullah	6; 2	7^{7} 6^{4}

==== Tajikistan vs. Pacific Oceania ====
Tajikistan
2
National Tennis Centre, Colombo, Sri Lanka
12 February 2000

Pacific Oceania
0

			1	2	3
1	(Tajikistan) (Pacific Oceania)	Sergey Makashin; Brett Baudinet	7; 5	6; 4
2	(Tajikistan) (Pacific Oceania)	Mansur Yakhyaev; Lency Tenai	6; 3	6; 0
3	(Tajikistan) (Pacific Oceania)	Sergey Makashin / Mansur Yakhyaev; Lency Tenai / Brett Baudinet				not played

=== 5th to 6th play-off ===
==== Singapore vs. Tajikistan ====
Singapore
1
National Tennis Centre, Colombo, Sri Lanka
13 February 2000

Tajikistan
2

			1	2	3
1	(Singapore) (Tajikistan)	Kho Tung-yi; Sergey Makashin	6; 3	1; 4		retired
2	(Singapore) (Tajikistan)	Yang Sian; Mansur Yakhyaev	4; 6	2; 6
3	(Singapore) (Tajikistan)	Jensen Hiu / Yang Sian; Sergey Makashin / Sergei Sedov	6; 3	6; 4

=== 7th to 8th play-off ===
==== Bangladesh vs. Pacific Oceania ====
Bangladesh
2
National Tennis Centre, Colombo, Sri Lanka
13 February 2000

Pacific Oceania
1

			1	2	3
1	(Bangladesh) (Pacific Oceania)	Dilip Passia; Cyril Jacobe	1; 6	2; 6
2	(Bangladesh) (Pacific Oceania)	Nadeem-Kamran Khan; Jerome Rovo	6; 4	6; 2
3	(Bangladesh) (Pacific Oceania)	Abu-Hena-Tasawar Collins / Dilip Passia; Lency Tenai / Brett Baudinet	3; 6	6; 4	9; 7
