= Tajikistan Davis Cup team =

Tajikistan
- Captain: Mirkhusein Yakhyaev
- Coach: -
- Nations Ranking: 123
- First year: 1997
- Years played: 14
- Ties played (W–L): 63 (32 - 31)
- Years in World Group: 0 (0 - 0)
- Most total wins: Mansur Yakhyaev (44 - 23)
- Most singles wins: Mansur Yakhyaev (26 - 9)
- Most doubles wins: Mansur Yakhyaev (18 - 14)
- Best doubles team: Team: Sergey Makashin and Mansur Yakhyaev (14 - 11)
- Most ties played: Sergey Makashin (49)
- Most years played: Mansur Yakhyaev (11); Sergey Makashin (11)

The Tajikistan men's national tennis team represents Tajikistan in Davis Cup tennis competition and are governed by the National Tennis Federation of the Republic of Tajikistan.

Tajikistan currently compete in the Asia/Oceania Zone of Group IV.

They reached Group II in 2003, but lost all its ties at that level.

== History ==
Tajikistan competed in its first Davis Cup in 1997. Tajik players previously represented the Soviet Union.

== Current team (2022) ==
TBD

== Tournaments ==
Year	Zone	Notes
1997	Asia/Oceania Zone Group IV	Round-Robin, Promoted
1998	Asia/Oceania Zone Group III	1st-4th Playoff
1999	Asia/Oceania Zone Group III	1st-4th Playoff
2000	Asia/Oceania Zone Group III	5th-8th Playoff
2001	Asia/Oceania Zone Group III	?
2002	Asia/Oceania Zone Group III	Promotion pool, Promoted
2003	Asia/Oceania Zone Group II	1st round, Relegated
2004	Asia/Oceania Zone Group III	1st-4th Playoff
2005	Asia/Oceania Zone Group III	Group A, Relegated
2006	Asia/Oceania Zone Group IV	Pool B
2007	Asia/Oceania Zone Group IV	Pool A, Promoted
2008	Asia/Oceania Zone Group III	5th-8th Playoff
2009	Asia/Oceania Zone Group III	Relegation pool, Relegated
2016	Asia/Oceania Zone Group IV	7th-8th place

== Statistics ==
Since 1997(Last updated 26 September 2016)

Tajikistan w/o ... in YYYY. ... w/o Tajikistan in YYYY.

Record

- Champion: none
- Runner-up: none
- Lost in semifinals: none
- Lost in quarterfinals: none
- Lost in first round: n times

Home and away record (all NN match-ups)

- Performance at home (NN match-ups): NN–NN (NN.N%)
- Performance away (NN match-ups): NN–NN (NN.N%)
- Total: NN–NN (NN.N%)

Head-to-head record (1997–)

- Bangladesh 1-0
- Bahrain 2-1
- Hong Kong 0-3
- Iran 0-4
- Iraq 0-1
- Jordan 3-1
- Kazakhstan 0-3
- Saudi Arabia 3-3
- Kuwait 1-0
- Lebanon 0-1
- Malaysia 2-2
- Mongolia 1-0
- Myanmar 0-1
- Oman 2-0
- Philippines 0-1
- Pacific Oceania 4-2
- Qatar 2-1
- Singapore 4-0
- Sri Lanka 0-2
- Syria 1-3
- Turkmenistan 2-0
- United Arab Emirates 3-1
- Vietnam 1-1

== See also ==
- Davis Cup
- Tajikistan Billie Jean King Cup team
