= 1997 Davis Cup =

1997 edition of the Davis Cup

Details
- Duration: 7 February – 30 November 1997
- Edition: 86th
- Teams: 127

Champion
- Winning nation: Sweden

The 1997 Davis Cup (also known as the 1997 Davis Cup by NEC for sponsorship purposes) was the 86th edition of the Davis Cup, the most important tournament between national teams in men's tennis. 127 teams entered the competition, 16 in the World Group, 25 in the Americas Zone, 29 in the Asia/Oceania Zone, and 57 in the Europe/Africa Zone. A new Group IV of competition was added to each regional zone, providing another level of promotion and relegation within each zone. Madagascar, Tajikistan and Uganda made their first appearances in the tournament.

Sweden defeated the United States in the final, held at the Scandinavium in Gothenburg, Sweden, on 28–30 November, to win their 6th title overall.

== World Group ==
Participating teams
Australia	Brazil	Czech Republic	France
Germany	India	Italy	Mexico
Netherlands	Romania	Russia	South Africa
Spain	Sweden	Switzerland	United States

=== Draw ===
First round 7–9 February
Ribeirão Preto, Brazil (clay)
United States	4
Brazil	1
Bucharest, Romania (indoor hard)
Netherlands	3
Romania	2
Sydney, Australia (grass)
France	1
Australia	4
Příbram, Czech Republic (indoor clay)
Czech Republic	3
India	2
Rome, Italy (clay)
Mexico	1
Italy	4
Mallorca, Spain (clay)
Spain	4
Germany	1
Durban, South Africa (hard)
South Africa	3
Russia	1
Luleå, Sweden (indoor hard)
Switzerland	1
Sweden	4

Quarterfinals; 4–6 April
Newport Beach, CA, United States (hard)
United States	4
Netherlands	1
Adelaide, Australia (grass)
Australia	5
Czech Republic	0
Pesaro, Italy (indoor carpet)
Italy	4
Spain	1
Växjö, Sweden (indoor carpet)
South Africa	2
Sweden	3

Semifinals; 19–21 September
Washington, DC, United States (hard)
United States	4
Australia	1
Norrköping, Sweden (indoor carpet)
Italy	1
Sweden	4

Final; 28–30 November
Gothenburg, Sweden (indoor carpet)
United States	0
Sweden	5

=== Final ===
Sweden vs. United States

Sweden
5
Scandinavium, Gothenburg, Sweden
28–30 November 1997
Carpet (indoors)

United States
0

			1	2	3	4	5
1	(Sweden) (United States)	Jonas Björkman; Michael Chang	7; 5	1; 6	6; 3	6; 3
2	(Sweden) (United States)	Magnus Larsson; Pete Sampras	3; 6	7^{7} 6^{1}	2; 1			retired
3	(Sweden) (United States)	Jonas Björkman / Nicklas Kulti; Todd Martin / Jonathan Stark	6; 4	6; 4	6; 4
4	(Sweden) (United States)	Jonas Björkman; Jonathan Stark	6; 1	6; 1
5	(Sweden) (United States)	Magnus Larsson; Michael Chang	7^{7} 6^{4}	6^{6} 7^{8}	6; 4

== World Group qualifying round ==
Date: 19–21 September

The eight losing teams in the World Group first round ties and eight winners of the Zonal Group I final round ties competed in the World Group qualifying round for spots in the 1998 World Group.

Home team	Score	Visiting team	Location	Venue	Door	Surface
Zimbabwe	3–2	Austria	Harare	City Sports Centre	Indoor	Hard
Brazil	5–0	New Zealand	Florianópolis	Costão Santinho Hotel	Outdoor	Clay
India	3–2	Chile	New Delhi	R.K. Khanna Tennis Complex	Outdoor	Grass
Belgium	3–2	France	Ghent	Flanders Expo	Indoor	Clay
Germany	5–0	Mexico	Essen	Grugahalle	Indoor	Carpet
Russia	3–2	Romania	Moscow	Olympic Stadium	Indoor	Carpet
Canada	1–4	Slovakia	Montreal	Jarry Park Stadium	Indoor	Carpet
Switzerland	3–2	South Korea	Locarno	FEVI	Indoor	Carpet

- Brazil, Germany, India, Russia and Switzerland remain in the World Group in 1998.
- Belgium, Slovakia and Zimbabwe are promoted to the World Group in 1998.
- Austria, Canada, Chile, New Zealand and South Korea remain in Zonal Group I in 1998.
- France, Mexico and Romania are relegated to Zonal Group I in 1998.

== Americas Zone ==
=== Group I ===
Second Round Play-offs
Buenos Aires, Argentina (clay)
Venezuela	1
Argentina	4

First Round Play-offs
Nassau, Bahamas (hard)
Venezuela	2
Bahamas	3
Buenos Aires, Argentina (clay)
Ecuador	3
Argentina	1

First Round
Venezuela
bye
Montreal, Canada (indoor hard)
Bahamas	1
Canada	4
Santiago, Chile (clay)
Chile	4
Ecuador	1
bye
Argentina

Second Round
Montreal, Canada (indoor hard)
Venezuela	0
Canada	5
Santiago, Chile (clay)
Chile	3
Argentina	2

- Venezuela relegated to Group II in 1998.
- Canada and Chile advance to World Group qualifying round.

=== Group II ===
Relegation Play-offs
San Juan, Puerto Rico (hard)
Cuba	4
Puerto Rico	1
San Salvador, El Salvador (clay)
Haiti	3
El Salvador	2

First Round
Havana, Cuba (hard)
Peru	3
Cuba	2
San Juan, Puerto Rico (hard)
Puerto Rico	2
Colombia	3
Asunción, Paraguay (clay)
Paraguay	5
Haiti	0
San Salvador, El Salvador (hard)
El Salvador	1
Uruguay	4

Second Round
Cali, Colombia (clay)
Peru	0
Colombia	5
Asunción, Paraguay (clay)
Paraguay	2
Uruguay	3

Third Round
Bogotá, Colombia (clay)
Colombia	4
Uruguay	1

- Puerto Rico and El Salvador relegated to Group III in 1998.
- Colombia promoted to Group I in 1998.

=== Group III ===
- Venue: Southampton Princess Hotel, Southampton, Bermuda
- Date: 29 April–3 May

Rank	Team
1	Guatemala
2	Jamaica
3	Antigua and Barbuda
4	Panama
5	Dominican Republic
6	Bolivia
7	Barbados
8	Trinidad and Tobago

- Guatemala and Jamaica promoted to Group II in 1998.
- Barbados and Trinidad and Tobago relegated to Group IV in 1998.

=== Group IV ===
- Venue: Southampton Princess Hotel, Southampton, Bermuda
- Date: 1–3 May

	BER	CRC	ECA	RR; W–L	Match; W–L	Set; W–L	Standings
Bermuda		2–1	2–1	2–0	4–2 (67%)	9–5 (64%)	1
Costa Rica	1–2		2–1	1–1	3–3 (50%)	6–8 (43%)	2
Eastern Caribbean	1–2	1–2		0–2	2–4 (25%)	5–7 (42%)	3

- Bermuda and Costa Rica promoted to Group III in 1998.

== Asia/Oceania Zone ==
=== Group I ===
Second Round Play-offs
Tashkent, Uzbekistan (hard)
Philippines	0
Uzbekistan	5

First Round Play-offs
bye
Philippines
Tashkent, Uzbekistan (clay)
Uzbekistan	2
Japan	3

First Round
New Zealand
bye
Manila, Philippines (indoor clay)
Philippines	2
Indonesia	3
Beijing, China (indoor hard)
Uzbekistan	1
China	4
Seoul, South Korea (indoor carpet)
South Korea	3
Japan	2

Second Round
Jakarta, Indonesia (clay)
New Zealand	5
Indonesia	0
Beijing, China (indoor carpet)
China	1
South Korea	4

- Philippines relegated to Group II in 1998.
- New Zealand and South Korea advance to World Group qualifying round.

=== Group II ===
Relegation Play-offs
Islamabad, Pakistan (clay)
Singapore	0
Pakistan	5
Riyadh, Saudi Arabia (hard)
Saudi Arabia	1
Hong Kong	4

First Round
Taipei, Taiwan (indoor hard)
Chinese Taipei	5
Singapore	0
Islamabad, Pakistan (clay)
Pakistan	2
Iran	3
Riyadh, Saudi Arabia (hard)
Lebanon	5
Saudi Arabia	0
Causeway Bay, Hong Kong (hard)
Hong Kong	0
Thailand	5

Second Round
Tehran, Iran (clay)
Chinese Taipei	1
Iran	4
Beirut, Lebanon (indoor hard)
Lebanon	5
Thailand	0

Third Round
Beirut, Lebanon (indoor hard)
Iran	1
Lebanon	4

- Singapore and Saudi Arabia relegated to Group III in 1998.
- Lebanon promoted to Group I in 1998.

=== Group III ===
- Venue: Khalifa International Tennis and Squash Complex, Doha, Qatar
- Date: 26–30 March

Rank	Team
1	Qatar
2	Pacific Oceania
3	Kazakhstan
4	Kuwait
5	Malaysia
6	Sri Lanka
7	Bahrain
8	Bangladesh

- Qatar and Pacific Oceania promoted to Group II in 1998.
- Bahrain and Bangladesh relegated to Group IV in 1998.

=== Group IV ===
- Venue: InterContinental Hotel, Muscat, Oman
- Date: 26–30 March

	SYR	TJK	UAE	OMA	BRU	JOR	RR; W–L	Match; W–L	Set; W–L	Standings
Syria		2–1	3–0	3–0	3–0	NP	4–0	11–1 (92%)	22–3 (88%)	1
Tajikistan	1–2		3–0	3–0	NP	2–1	3–1	9–3 (75%)	18–6 (75%)	2
United Arab Emirates	0–3	0–3		NP	2–1	3–0	2–2	5–7 (42%)	10–16 (38%)	3
Oman	0–3	0–3	NP		2–1	2–1	2–2	4–8 (33%)	8–17 (32%)	4
Brunei	0–3	NP	1–2	1–2		2–1	1–3	4–8 (33%)	10–16 (38%)	5
Jordan	NP	1–2	0–3	1–2	1–2		0–4	3–9 (25%)	8–18 (31%)	6

- Syria and Tajikistan promoted to Group III in 1998.

== Europe/Africa Zone ==
=== Group I ===
Second Round Play-offs
Budapest, Hungary (clay)
Hungary	2
Ukraine	3
Israel	w/o
Morocco

First Round Play-offs
bye
Hungary
Kyiv, Ukraine (clay)
Great Britain	3
Ukraine	2
Israel
bye
Morocco
bye

First Round
Belgium
bye
Aalborg, Denmark (indoor carpet)
Denmark	5
Hungary	0
Great Britain
bye
Harare, Zimbabwe (indoor hard)
Ukraine	0
Zimbabwe	5
Israel
bye
bye
Slovakia
Osijek, Croatia (indoor carpet)
Morocco	1
Croatia	4
bye
Austria

Second Round
Brussels, Belgium (clay)
Belgium	3
Denmark	2
London, England (indoor carpet)
Great Britain	1
Zimbabwe	4
Bratislava, Slovakia (clay)
Israel	1
Slovakia	3
Graz, Austria (indoor clay)
Croatia	2
Austria	3

- Hungary and Morocco relegated to Group II in 1998.
- Belgium, Zimbabwe, Slovakia, and Austria advance to World Group qualifying round.

=== Group II ===
Relegation Play-offs
Tbilisi, Georgia (clay)
Nigeria	0
Georgia	5
Cairo, Egypt (clay)
Egypt	3
Lithuania	2
Jūrmala, Latvia (clay)
Latvia	4
Ghana	1
Dublin, Ireland (carpet)
Ireland	4
Greece	1

First Round
Snarøya, Norway (clay)
Norway	5
Nigeria	0
Tbilisi, Georgia (clay)
Georgia	2
Slovenia	3
Cairo, Egypt (clay)
Egypt	0
Portugal	5
Vilnius, Lithuania (indoor carpet)
Yugoslavia	3
Lithuania	2
Abidjan, Ivory Coast (hard)
Latvia	0
Ivory Coast	5
Poznań, Poland (clay)
Ghana	0
Poland	5
Dublin, Ireland (indoor hard)
Ireland	1
Belarus	4
Helsinki, Finland (indoor hard)
Greece	2
Finland	3

Second Round
Nova Gorica, Slovenia (clay)
Norway	4
Slovenia	1
Porto, Portugal (clay)
Portugal	3
Yugoslavia	2
Bytom, Poland (clay)
Ivory Coast	1
Poland	4
Tampere, Finland (clay)
Belarus	2
Finland	3

Third Round
Porto, Portugal (clay)
Norway	3
Portugal	2
Helsinki, Finland (indoor hard)
Poland	2
Finland	3

- Nigeria, Lithuania, Ghana, and Greece relegated to Group III in 1998.
- Norway and Finland promoted to Group I in 1998.

=== Group III ===
==== Zone A ====
- Venue: Dakar Olympic Club, Dakar, Senegal
- Date: 22–26 January

Rank	Team
1	Luxembourg
2	Senegal
3	Turkey
4	Macedonia
5	Bosnia and Herzegovina
6	San Marino
7	Armenia
8	Ethiopia

- Luxembourg and Senegal promoted to Group II in 1998.
- Armenia and Ethiopia relegated to Group IV in 1998.

==== Zone B ====
- Venue: Lokomotiv Tennis Club, Plovdiv, Bulgaria
- Date: 21–25 May

Rank	Team
1	Bulgaria
2	Monaco
3	Estonia
4	Moldova
5	Kenya
6	Malta
7	Algeria
8	Cameroon

- Bulgaria and Monaco promoted to Group II in 1998.
- Algeria and Cameroon relegated to Group IV in 1998.

=== Group IV ===
==== Zone A ====
- Venue: Tennis Centre, Gaborone, Botswana
- Date: 19–23 March

Rank	Team
1	Madagascar
2	Togo
3	Liechtenstein
4	Botswana
5	Uganda
6	Sudan
7	Iceland
8	Djibouti

- Madagascar and Togo promoted to Group III in 1998.

==== Zone B ====
- Venue: Field Club, Nicosia, Cyprus
- Date: 21–25 May

	TUN	CYP	BEN	ZAM	AZE	CGO	RR; W–L	Match; W–L	Set; W–L	Standings
Tunisia		2–1	3–0	2–1	3–0	3–0	5–0	13–2 (87%)	27–5 (84%)	1
Cyprus	1–2		2–1	2–1	3–0	3–0	4–1	11–4 (73%)	23–8 (74%)	2
Benin	0–3	1–2		2–1	3–0	3–0	3–2	9–6 (60%)	16–12 (57%)	3
Zambia	1–2	1–2	1–2		3–0	3–0	2–3	9–6 (60%)	17–13 (57%)	4
Azerbaijan	0–3	0–3	0–3	0–3		2–1	1–4	2–13 (13%)	4–24 (14%)	5
Congo	0–3	0–3	0–3	0–3	1–2		0–5	1–14 (7%)	3–28 (10%)	6

- Tunisia and Cyprus promoted to Group III in 1998.
