= 1992 Davis Cup Asia/Oceania Zone Group III =

International tennis competition

The Asia/Oceania Zone was one of the three zones of the regional Davis Cup competition in 1992.

In the Asia/Oceania Zone there were three different tiers, called groups, in which teams competed against each other to advance to the upper tier. Winners in Group III advanced to the Asia/Oceania Zone Group II in 1993. All other teams remained in Group III.

== Participating nations ==
- Bahrain
- Iran
- Kuwait
- Lebanon
- Qatar
- Saudi Arabia
- Syria

=== Draw ===
- Venue: Isa Town Tennis Courts, Manama, Bahrain
- Date: 20–26 April

	IRI	KUW	LIB	BHR	QAT	SYR	KSA	RR; W–L	Match; W–L	Set; W–L	Standings
Iran		3–0	3–0	2–1	2–1	2–1	3–0	6–0	15–3 (83%)	30–10 (75%)	1
Kuwait	0–3		3–0	2–1	2–1	2–1	3–0	5–1	12–6 (67%)	27–15 (64%)	2
Lebanon	0–3	0–3		2–1	2–1	2–1	3–0	4–2	9–9 (50%)	21–19 (53%)	3
Bahrain	1–2	1–2	1–2		2–1	2–1	2–1	3–3	9–9 (50%)	20–20 (50%)	4
Qatar	1–2	1–2	1–2	1–2		2–1	2–1	2–4	8–10 (44%)	18–23 (44%)	5
Syria	1–2	1–2	1–2	1–2	1–2		3–0	1–5	8–10 (44%)	19–22 (46%)	6
Saudi Arabia	0–3	0–3	0–3	1–2	1–2	0–3		0–6	2–16 (11%)	7–33 (18%)	7

- Iran and Kuwait promoted to Group II in 1993

== Results ==
=== Iran vs. Lebanon ===
Iran
3
Isa Town Tennis Courts, Manama, Bahrain
20 April 1992

Lebanon
0

			1	2	3
1	(Iran) (Lebanon)	Moharram-Ali Khodai; Raymond Kattoura	6; 3	6; 4
2	(Iran) (Lebanon)	Mustafa Saleh; Karim El Khoury	6; 4	6; 0
3	(Iran) (Lebanon)	Kamyab Derafshijavan / Mustafa Saleh; Karim El Khoury / Raymond Kattoura	6; 3	6; 4

=== Kuwait vs. Syria ===
Kuwait
2
Isa Town Tennis Courts, Manama, Bahrain
20 April 1992

Syria
1

			1	2	3
1	(Kuwait) (Syria)	Aymen-Ibrahim Al-Ashwak; Samer Mourad	6; 2	7; 5
2	(Kuwait) (Syria)	Khaled Al Foudari; Dawood Dawoodian	6; 4	4; 6	9; 7
3	(Kuwait) (Syria)	Aymen-Ibrahim Al-Ashwak / Khaled Ashkanani; Samer Mourad / Saher Saadeldin	3; 6	4; 6

=== Qatar vs. Saudi Arabia ===
Qatar
2
Isa Town Tennis Courts, Manama, Bahrain
20 April 1992

Saudi Arabia
1

			1	2	3
1	(Qatar) (Saudi Arabia)	Aymen-Azmy Galal; Othman Al-Anazi	3; 6	7; 5	6; 3
2	(Qatar) (Saudi Arabia)	Nasser Al-Khelaifi; Bader Mohammed Almuqail	6; 4	6^{5} 7^{7}	2; 6
3	(Qatar) (Saudi Arabia)	Nasser Al-Khelaifi / Aymen-Azmy Galal; Othman Al-Anazi / Bader Mohammed Almuqail	6; 3	6; 2

=== Bahrain vs. Iran ===
Bahrain
1
Isa Town Tennis Courts, Manama, Bahrain
21 April 1992

Iran
2

			1	2	3
1	(Bahrain) (Iran)	Esam Abdulaal; Kamyab Derafshijavan	6; 4	6; 2
2	(Bahrain) (Iran)	Shehab Shehab; Mustafa Saleh	1; 6	1; 6
3	(Bahrain) (Iran)	Esam Abdulaal / Abdul-Rahman Shehab; Kamyab Derafshijavan / Mustafa Saleh	3; 6	2; 6

=== Qatar vs. Syria ===
Qatar
2
Isa Town Tennis Courts, Manama, Bahrain
21 April 1992

Syria
1

			1	2	3
1	(Qatar) (Syria)	Aymen-Azmy Galal; Saher Saadeldin	6; 1	6; 0
2	(Qatar) (Syria)	Nasser Al-Khelaifi; Dawood Dawoodian	0; 6	1; 6
3	(Qatar) (Syria)	Nasser Al-Khelaifi / Aymen-Azmy Galal; Dawood Dawoodian / Samer Mourad	6; 2	3; 6	7; 5

=== Saudi Arabia vs. Kuwait ===
Saudi Arabia
0
Isa Town Tennis Courts, Manama, Bahrain
21 April 1992

Kuwait
3

			1	2	3
1	(Saudi Arabia) (Kuwait)	Othman Al-Anazi; Aymen-Ibrahim Al-Ashwak	1; 6	0; 6
2	(Saudi Arabia) (Kuwait)	Bader Mohammed Almuqail; Khaled Al Foudari	2; 6	2; 6
3	(Saudi Arabia) (Kuwait)	Othman Al-Anazi / Abdel-Wahab Abdel Karim; Khaled Al Foudari / Khaled Ashkanani	4; 6	2; 6

=== Bahrain vs. Lebanon ===
Bahrain
1
Isa Town Tennis Courts, Manama, Bahrain
22 April 1992

Lebanon
2

			1	2	3
1	(Bahrain) (Lebanon)	Esam Abdulaal; Raymond Kattoura	7^{7} 6^{3}	6; 1
2	(Bahrain) (Lebanon)	Shehab Shehab; Karim El Khoury	2; 6	2; 6
3	(Bahrain) (Lebanon)	Esam Abdulaal / Abdul-Rahman Shehab; Karim El Khoury / Raymond Kattoura	5; 7	2; 6

=== Kuwait vs. Qatar ===
Kuwait
2
Isa Town Tennis Courts, Manama, Bahrain
22 April 1992

Qatar
1

			1	2	3
1	(Kuwait) (Qatar)	Aymen-Ibrahim Al-Ashwak; Aymen-Azmy Galal	1; 6	6^{2} 7^{7}
2	(Kuwait) (Qatar)	Khaled Al Foudari; Nasser Al-Khelaifi	6; 1	6; 2
3	(Kuwait) (Qatar)	Khaled Al Foudari / Khaled Ashkanani; Nasser Al-Khelaifi / Aymen-Azmy Galal	6; 1	7^{7} 6^{3}

=== Saudi Arabia vs. Syria ===
Saudi Arabia
0
Isa Town Tennis Courts, Manama, Bahrain
22 April 1992

Syria
3

			1	2	3
1	(Saudi Arabia) (Syria)	Othman Al-Anazi; Samer Mourad	2; 6	5; 7
2	(Saudi Arabia) (Syria)	Bader Mohammed Almuqail; Dawood Dawoodian	4; 6	3; 6
3	(Saudi Arabia) (Syria)	Othman Al-Anazi / Bader Mohammed Almuqail; Dawood Dawoodian / Samer Mourad	5; 7	0; 6

=== Bahrain vs. Qatar ===
Bahrain
2
Isa Town Tennis Courts, Manama, Bahrain
23 April 1992

Qatar
1

			1	2	3
1	(Bahrain) (Qatar)	Esam Abdulaal; Aymen-Azmy Galal	6; 3	6; 2
2	(Bahrain) (Qatar)	Shehab Shehab; Nasser Al-Khelaifi	2; 6	7^{9} 6^{7}	3; 6
3	(Bahrain) (Qatar)	Esam Abdulaal / Abdul-Rahman Shehab; Nasser Al-Khelaifi / Aymen-Azmy Galal	4; 6	7; 5	10; 8

=== Iran vs. Saudi Arabia ===
Iran
3
Isa Town Tennis Courts, Manama, Bahrain
23 April 1992

Saudi Arabia
0

			1	2	3
1	(Iran) (Saudi Arabia)	Moharram-Ali Khodai; Abdel-Wahab Abdel Karim	6; 3	6; 0
2	(Iran) (Saudi Arabia)	Mustafa Saleh; Bader Mohammed Almuqail	6; 2	6; 1
3	(Iran) (Saudi Arabia)	Kamyab Derafshijavan / Mustafa Saleh; Othman Al-Anazi / Bader Mohammed Almuqail	6; 3	4; 6	6; 2

=== Lebanon vs. Syria ===
Lebanon
2
Isa Town Tennis Courts, Manama, Bahrain
23 April 1992

Syria
1

			1	2	3
1	(Lebanon) (Syria)	Raymond Kattoura; Samer Mourad	6; 3	6; 2
2	(Lebanon) (Syria)	Karim El Khoury; Dawood Dawoodian	6; 1	2; 6	8; 10
3	(Lebanon) (Syria)	Karim El Khoury / Raymond Kattoura; Samer Mourad / Saher Saadeldin	6; 3	6; 2

=== Bahrain vs. Syria ===
Bahrain
2
Isa Town Tennis Courts, Manama, Bahrain
24 April 1992

Syria
1

			1	2	3
1	(Bahrain) (Syria)	Esam Abdulaal; Samer Mourad	6; 4	6; 4
2	(Bahrain) (Syria)	Shehab Shehab; Dawood Dawoodian	7^{7} 6^{5}	4; 6	0; 6
3	(Bahrain) (Syria)	Esam Abdulaal / Abdul-Rahman Shehab; Samer Mourad / Saher Saadeldin	6; 3	6; 1

=== Iran vs. Qatar ===
Iran
2
Isa Town Tennis Courts, Manama, Bahrain
24 April 1992

Qatar
1

			1	2	3
1	(Iran) (Qatar)	Moharram-Ali Khodai; Aymen-Azmy Galal	2; 6	5; 7
2	(Iran) (Qatar)	Mustafa Saleh; Abdul-Hadi Al Mulla	6; 2	6; 1
3	(Iran) (Qatar)	Kamyab Derafshijavan / Mustafa Saleh; Nasser Al-Khelaifi / Aymen-Azmy Galal	6; 2	6; 2

=== Kuwait vs. Lebanon ===
Kuwait
3
Isa Town Tennis Courts, Manama, Bahrain
24 April 1992

Lebanon
0

			1	2	3
1	(Kuwait) (Lebanon)	Aymen-Ibrahim Al-Ashwak; Raymond Kattoura	4; 6	7^{7} 6^{1}	8; 6
2	(Kuwait) (Lebanon)	Khaled Al Foudari; Karim El Khoury	6; 3	4; 6	6; 4
3	(Kuwait) (Lebanon)	Khaled Al Foudari / Khaled Ashkanani; Karim El Khoury / Raymond Kattoura	6; 4	6; 4

=== Bahrain vs. Saudi Arabia ===
Bahrain
2
Isa Town Tennis Courts, Manama, Bahrain
25 April 1992

Saudi Arabia
1

			1	2	3
1	(Bahrain) (Saudi Arabia)	Esam Abdulaal; Othman Al-Anazi	6; 2	6; 1
2	(Bahrain) (Saudi Arabia)	Shehab Shehab; Bader Mohammed Almuqail	4; 6	4; 6
3	(Bahrain) (Saudi Arabia)	Esam Abdulaal / Shehab Shehab; Othman Al-Anazi / Bader Mohammed Almuqail	6; 2	7; 5

=== Iran vs. Kuwait ===
Iran
3
Isa Town Tennis Courts, Manama, Bahrain
25 April 1992

Kuwait
0

			1	2	3
1	(Iran) (Kuwait)	Moharram-Ali Khodai; Aymen-Ibrahim Al-Ashwak	7; 5	6; 4
2	(Iran) (Kuwait)	Mustafa Saleh; Khaled Al Foudari	6; 0	6^{7} 7^{9}	6; 4
3	(Iran) (Kuwait)	Kamyab Derafshijavan / Mustafa Saleh; Khaled Al Foudari / Khaled Ashkanani	6; 4	3; 6	6; 2

=== Lebanon vs. Qatar ===
Lebanon
2
Isa Town Tennis Courts, Manama, Bahrain
25 April 1992

Qatar
1

			1	2	3
1	(Lebanon) (Qatar)	Hussein Badreddine; Aymen-Azmy Galal	3; 6	4; 6
2	(Lebanon) (Qatar)	Karim El Khoury; Nasser Al-Khelaifi	7; 5	6; 2
3	(Lebanon) (Qatar)	Karim El Khoury / Raymond Kattoura; Nasser Al-Khelaifi / Aymen-Azmy Galal	6; 2	6; 3

=== Bahrain vs. Kuwait ===
Bahrain
1
Isa Town Tennis Courts, Manama, Bahrain
26 April 1992

Kuwait
2

			1	2	3
1	(Bahrain) (Kuwait)	Abdul-Rahman Shehab; Aymen-Ibrahim Al-Ashwak	3; 6	2; 6
2	(Bahrain) (Kuwait)	Esam Abdulaal; Khaled Al Foudari	6; 3	3; 6	6; 2
3	(Bahrain) (Kuwait)	Esam Abdulaal / Abdul-Rahman Shehab; Khaled Al Foudari / Khaled Ashkanani	2; 6	0; 6

=== Iran vs. Syria ===
Iran
2
Isa Town Tennis Courts, Manama, Bahrain
26 April 1992

Syria
1

			1	2	3
1	(Iran) (Syria)	Moharram-Ali Khodai; Samer Mourad	4; 6	6^{6} 7^{8}
2	(Iran) (Syria)	Mustafa Saleh; Dawood Dawoodian	6; 2	6^{1} 7^{7}	6; 1
3	(Iran) (Syria)	Kamyab Derafshijavan / Mustafa Saleh; Samer Mourad / Saher Saadeldin	6; 2	6; 2

=== Lebanon vs. Saudi Arabia ===
Lebanon
3
Isa Town Tennis Courts, Manama, Bahrain
26 April 1992

Saudi Arabia
0

			1	2	3
1	(Lebanon) (Saudi Arabia)	Raymond Kattoura; Othman Al-Anazi	6; 4	6; 2
2	(Lebanon) (Saudi Arabia)	Karim El Khoury; Bader Mohammed Almuqail	6^{1} 7^{7}	7; 5	6; 4
3	(Lebanon) (Saudi Arabia)	Hussein Badreddine / Karim El Khoury; Abdel-Wahab Abdel Karim / Bader Mohammed Almuqail	7^{7} 6^{2}	6; 3
