= 1999 Davis Cup Asia/Oceania Zone Group III =

International tennis competition

The Asia/Oceania Zone was one of the three zones of the regional Davis Cup competition in 1999.

In the Asia/Oceania Zone there were four different tiers, called groups, in which teams competed against each other to advance to the upper tier. The top two teams in Group III advanced to the Asia/Oceania Zone Group II in 2000, whereas the bottom two teams were relegated to the Asia/Oceania Zone Group IV in 2000.

== Participating nations ==
- Bahrain
- Bangladesh
- Hong Kong
- Malaysia
- Pacific Oceania
- Saudi Arabia
- Syria
- Tajikistan

=== Draw ===
- Venue: National Centre, Dhaka, Bangladesh
- Date: 10–14 March

Group A

	MAS	HKG	BAN	SYR	RR; W–L	Match; W–L	Set; W–L	Standings
Malaysia		3–0	3–0	2–1	3–0	8–1 (89%)	16–4 (80%)	1
Hong Kong	0–3		3–0	3–0	2–1	6–3 (67%)	13–7 (65%)	2
Bangladesh	0–3	0–3		2–1	1–2	2–7 (22%)	5–16 (24%)	3
Syria	1–2	0–3	1–2		0–3	2–7 (22%)	7–14 (33%)	4

Group B

	TJK	POC	KSA	BHR	RR; W–L	Match; W–L	Set; W–L	Standings
Tajikistan		2–1	2–1	w/o	3–0	4–2 (67%)	9–5 (64%)	1
Pacific Oceania	1–2		2–1	w/o	2–1	3–3 (50%)	6–6 (50%)	2
Saudi Arabia	1–2	1–2		w/o	1–2	2–4 (33%)	5–9 (36%)	3
Bahrain	w/o	w/o	w/o		0–3	N/A	N/A	4

1st to 4th place play-offs

3rd-4th Play-off
B2	Pacific Oceania	0
B1	Tajikistan	3

Semifinals
A1	Malaysia	3
B2	Pacific Oceania	0
A2	Hong Kong	2
B1	Tajikistan	1

Final
A1	Malaysia	2
A2	Hong Kong	1

5th to 8th place play-offs

7th-8th Play-off
B4	Bahrain
B3	Saudi Arabia	w/o

5th-8th Play-offs
A3	Bangladesh	w/o
B4	Bahrain
A4	Syria	2
B3	Saudi Arabia	1

5th-6th Play-off
A3	Bangladesh	2
A4	Syria	1

=== Final standings ===
Rank	Team
1	Malaysia
2	Hong Kong
3	Tajikistan
4	Pacific Oceania
5	Bangladesh
6	Syria
7	Saudi Arabia
8	Bahrain

- Malaysia and Hong Kong promoted to Group II in 2000.
- Saudi Arabia and Bahrain relegated to Group IV in 2000.

== Round robin ==
=== Group A ===
==== Bangladesh vs. Syria ====
Bangladesh
2
National Centre, Dhaka, Bangladesh
10 March 1999

Syria
1

			1	2	3
1	(Bangladesh) (Syria)	Moinuddin Walliullah; Samir Saadeldin	4; 6	7; 5	6; 3
2	(Bangladesh) (Syria)	Nadeem-Kamran Khan; Rabi Bouhassoun	4; 6	3; 6
3	(Bangladesh) (Syria)	Shovon Jamaly / Moinuddin Walliullah; Samir Saadeldin / Rabi Bouhassoun	4; 6	6; 1	8; 6

==== Hong Kong vs. Malaysia ====
Hong Kong
0
National Centre, Dhaka, Bangladesh
10 March 1999

Malaysia
3

			1	2	3
1	(Hong Kong) (Malaysia)	Melvin Tong; Hazuan Hizan	6; 4	4; 6	3; 6
2	(Hong Kong) (Malaysia)	Wayne Wong; Selvam Veerasingam	4; 6	3; 6
3	(Hong Kong) (Malaysia)	Melvin Tong / Wayne Wong; Ramayah Ramachandran / Selvam Veerasingam	6^{7} 7^{9}	6^{4} 7^{7}

==== Bangladesh vs. Malaysia ====
Bangladesh
0
National Centre, Dhaka, Bangladesh
11 March 1999

Malaysia
3

			1	2	3
1	(Bangladesh) (Malaysia)	Dilip Passia; Hazuan Hizan	6; 3	3; 6	7; 9
2	(Bangladesh) (Malaysia)	Nadeem-Kamran Khan; Selvam Veerasingam	4; 6	2; 6
3	(Bangladesh) (Malaysia)	Shovon Jamaly / Moinuddin Walliullah; Ramayah Ramachandran / Si Yew Ming	4; 6	3; 6

==== Hong Kong vs. Syria ====
Hong Kong
3
National Centre, Dhaka, Bangladesh
11 March 1999

Syria
0

			1	2	3
1	(Hong Kong) (Syria)	Melvin Tong; Samir Saadeldin	6; 4	2; 6	6; 0
2	(Hong Kong) (Syria)	Wayne Wong; Rabi Bouhassoun	6; 2	6; 2
3	(Hong Kong) (Syria)	Wayne Wong / Michael Wu; Abdul-Rahim Salim / Lays Salim	6; 2	6; 2

==== Bangladesh vs. Hong Kong ====
Bangladesh
0
National Centre, Dhaka, Bangladesh
12 March 1999

Hong Kong
3

			1	2	3
1	(Bangladesh) (Hong Kong)	Dilip Passia; Melvin Tong	1; 6	1; 6
2	(Bangladesh) (Hong Kong)	Nadeem-Kamran Khan; Wayne Wong	6^{3} 7^{7}	3; 6
3	(Bangladesh) (Hong Kong)	Dilip Passia / Moinuddin Walliullah; Wayne Wong / Michael Wu	1; 6	1; 6

==== Malaysia vs. Syria ====
Malaysia
2
National Centre, Dhaka, Bangladesh
12 March 1999

Syria
1

			1	2	3
1	(Malaysia) (Syria)	Si Yew Ming; Lays Salim	6; 0	6; 2
2	(Malaysia) (Syria)	Ramayah Ramachandran; Samir Saadeldin	3; 6	1; 6
3	(Malaysia) (Syria)	Hazuan Hizan / Selvam Veerasingam; Samir Saadeldin / Lays Salim	6; 3	6; 0

=== Group B ===
==== Bahrain vs. Saudi Arabia ====
Bahrain

National Centre, Dhaka, Bangladesh
10 March 1999

Saudi Arabia
w/o

		1	2	3
1	(Bahrain) (Saudi Arabia)				not played
2	(Bahrain) (Saudi Arabia)				not played
3	(Bahrain) (Saudi Arabia)				not played

==== Saudi Arabia vs. Pacific Oceania ====
Saudi Arabia
1
National Centre, Dhaka, Bangladesh
10 March 1999

Pacific Oceania
2

			1	2	3
1	(Saudi Arabia) (Pacific Oceania)	Bader Mohammed Almuqail; Lawrence Tere	6; 3	6; 1
2	(Saudi Arabia) (Pacific Oceania)	Tawfiq Moafa; Lency Tenai	4; 6	4; 6
3	(Saudi Arabia) (Pacific Oceania)	Baqer Abu Khulaif / Bader Mohammed Almuqail; Lency Tenai / Lawrence Tere	6^{1} 7^{7}	4; 6

==== Bahrain vs. Pacific Oceania ====
Bahrain

National Centre, Dhaka, Bangladesh
11 March 1999

Pacific Oceania
w/o

		1	2	3
1	(Bahrain) (Pacific Oceania)				not played
2	(Bahrain) (Pacific Oceania)				not played
3	(Bahrain) (Pacific Oceania)				not played

==== Pacific Oceania vs. Tajikistan ====
Pacific Oceania
1
National Centre, Dhaka, Bangladesh
11 March 1999

Tajikistan
2

			1	2	3
1	(Pacific Oceania) (Tajikistan)	Lawrence Tere; Sergey Makashin	3; 6	4; 6
2	(Pacific Oceania) (Tajikistan)	Lency Tenai; Mansur Yakhyaev	5; 7	3; 6
3	(Pacific Oceania) (Tajikistan)	Lency Tenai / Lawrence Tere; Sergey Makashin / Mansur Yakhyaev	6; 3	7^{8} 6^{6}

==== Bahrain vs. Tajikistan ====
Bahrain

National Centre, Dhaka, Bangladesh
12 March 1999

Tajikistan
w/o

		1	2	3
1	(Bahrain) (Tajikistan)				not played
2	(Bahrain) (Tajikistan)				not played
3	(Bahrain) (Tajikistan)				not played

==== Saudi Arabia vs. Tajikistan ====
Saudi Arabia
1
National Centre, Dhaka, Bangladesh
12 March 1999

Tajikistan
2

			1	2	3
1	(Saudi Arabia) (Tajikistan)	Bader Mohammed Almuqail; Sergey Makashin	6; 4	4; 6	6; 0
2	(Saudi Arabia) (Tajikistan)	Tawfiq Moafa; Mansur Yakhyaev	1; 6	2; 6
3	(Saudi Arabia) (Tajikistan)	Baqer Abu Khulaif / Bader Mohammed Almuqail; Sergey Makashin / Mansur Yakhyaev	3; 6	6; 3	5; 7

== 1st to 4th place play-offs ==
=== Semifinals ===
==== Malaysia vs. Pacific Oceania ====
Malaysia
3
National Centre, Dhaka, Bangladesh
13 March 1999

Pacific Oceania
0

			1	2	3
1	(Malaysia) (Pacific Oceania)	Hazuan Hizan; Lawrence Tere	6; 4	6; 1
2	(Malaysia) (Pacific Oceania)	Selvam Veerasingam; Lency Tenai	7^{7} 6^{4}	6; 4
3	(Malaysia) (Pacific Oceania)	Ramayah Ramachandran / Si Yew Ming; Cyril Jacobe / Jerome Rovo	6; 3	6; 3

==== Hong Kong vs. Tajikistan ====
Hong Kong
2
National Centre, Dhaka, Bangladesh
13 March 1999

Tajikistan
1

			1	2	3
1	(Hong Kong) (Tajikistan)	Melvin Tong; Sergey Makashin	6; 2	6; 1
2	(Hong Kong) (Tajikistan)	Wayne Wong; Mansur Yakhyaev	1; 6	5; 7
3	(Hong Kong) (Tajikistan)	Melvin Tong / Wayne Wong; Sergey Makashin / Mansur Yakhyaev	7^{7} 6^{5}	6; 2

=== Final ===
==== Malaysia vs. Hong Kong ====
Malaysia
2
National Centre, Dhaka, Bangladesh
14 March 1999

Hong Kong
1

			1	2	3
1	(Malaysia) (Hong Kong)	Si Yew Ming; Michael Wu	6; 4	6; 4
2	(Malaysia) (Hong Kong)	Selvam Veerasingam; Wayne Wong	6; 3	6; 1
3	(Malaysia) (Hong Kong)	Ramayah Ramachandran / Selvam Veerasingam; Michael Wu / Ivan Yeh	4; 6	1; 6

=== 3rd to 4th play-off ===
==== Pacific Oceania vs. Tajikistan ====
Pacific Oceania
0
National Centre, Dhaka, Bangladesh
14 March 1999

Tajikistan
3

			1	2	3
1	(Pacific Oceania) (Tajikistan)	Cyril Jacobe; Sergey Makashin	1; 6	4; 6
2	(Pacific Oceania) (Tajikistan)	Jerome Rovo; Mansur Yakhyaev	2; 6	4; 6
3	(Pacific Oceania) (Tajikistan)	Cyril Jacobe / Jerome Rovo; Sergey Makashin / Mansur Yakhyaev	4; 6	6; 4	2; 6

== 5th to 8th place play-offs ==
=== 5th to 8th play-offs ===
==== Bangladesh vs. Bahrain ====
Bangladesh
w/o
National Centre, Dhaka, Bangladesh
13 March 1999

Bahrain

		1	2	3
1	(Bangladesh) (Bahrain)				not played
2	(Bangladesh) (Bahrain)				not played
3	(Bangladesh) (Bahrain)				not played

==== Syria vs. Saudi Arabia ====
Syria
2
National Centre, Dhaka, Bangladesh
13 March 1999

Saudi Arabia
1

			1	2	3
1	(Syria) (Saudi Arabia)	Samir Saadeldin; Bader Mohammed Almuqail	5; 7	3; 6
2	(Syria) (Saudi Arabia)	Rabi Bouhassoun; Tawfiq Moafa	6; 1	6; 3
3	(Syria) (Saudi Arabia)	Rabi Bouhassoun / Lays Salim; Baqer Abu Khulaif / Bader Mohammed Almuqail	6; 3	6^{5} 7^{7}	7; 5

=== 5th to 6th play-off ===
==== Bangladesh vs. Syria ====
Bangladesh
2
National Centre, Dhaka, Bangladesh
14 March 1999

Syria
1

			1	2	3
1	(Bangladesh) (Syria)	Dilip Passia; Samir Saadeldin	6; 4	6; 1
2	(Bangladesh) (Syria)	Moinuddin Walliullah; Rabi Bouhassoun	3; 6	2; 6
3	(Bangladesh) (Syria)	Shovon Jamaly / Moinuddin Walliullah; Rabi Bouhassoun / Lays Salim	6; 4	4; 2		retired

=== 7th to 8th play-off ===
==== Bahrain vs. Saudi Arabia ====
Bahrain

National Centre, Dhaka, Bangladesh
14 March 1999

Saudi Arabia
w/o

		1	2	3
1	(Bahrain) (Saudi Arabia)				not played
2	(Bahrain) (Saudi Arabia)				not played
3	(Bahrain) (Saudi Arabia)				not played
