= 1997 Davis Cup Asia/Oceania Zone Group IV =

International tennis competition

The Asia/Oceania Zone was one of the three zones of the regional Davis Cup competition in 1997.

In the Asia/Oceania Zone there were four different tiers, called groups, in which teams competed against each other to advance to the upper tier. The top two teams in Group IV advanced to the Asia/Oceania Zone Group III in 1998. All other teams remained in Group IV.

== Participating nations ==
- Brunei
- Jordan
- Oman
- Syria
- Tajikistan
- United Arab Emirates

=== Draw ===
- Venue: InterContinental Hotel, Muscat, Oman
- Date: 26–30 March

	SYR	TJK	UAE	OMA	BRU	JOR	RR; W–L	Match; W–L	Set; W–L	Standings
Syria		2–1	3–0	3–0	3–0	NP	4–0	11–1 (92%)	22–3 (88%)	1
Tajikistan	1–2		3–0	3–0	NP	2–1	3–1	9–3 (75%)	18–6 (75%)	2
United Arab Emirates	0–3	0–3		NP	2–1	3–0	2–2	5–7 (42%)	10–16 (38%)	3
Oman	0–3	0–3	NP		2–1	2–1	2–2	4–8 (33%)	8–17 (32%)	4
Brunei	0–3	NP	1–2	1–2		2–1	1–3	4–8 (33%)	10–16 (38%)	5
Jordan	NP	1–2	0–3	1–2	1–2		0–4	3–9 (25%)	8–18 (31%)	6

- Syria and Tajikistan promoted to Group III in 1998.

== Results ==
=== Oman vs. Brunei ===
Oman
2
InterContinental Hotel, Muscat, Oman
26 March 1997

Brunei
1

			1	2	3
1	(Oman) (Brunei)	Fahad Qamar Al-Hashmi; Ismasufian Ibrahim	3; 6	1; 6
2	(Oman) (Brunei)	Mudrik Al-Rawahi; Chua Pheng-chai	6; 0	6; 0
3	(Oman) (Brunei)	Khalid Al-Nabhani / Mudrik Al-Rawahi; Chua Pheng-chai / Ismasufian Ibrahim	4; 6	7; 5	7; 5

=== Jordan vs. Tajikistan ===
Jordan
1
InterContinental Hotel, Muscat, Oman
26 March 1997

Tajikistan
2

			1	2	3
1	(Jordan) (Tajikistan)	Fares Azzouni; Sergey Makashin	6; 2	6; 2
2	(Jordan) (Tajikistan)	Ahmed Ibrahim Ahmad Alhadid; Mansur Yakhyaev	0; 6	0; 6
3	(Jordan) (Tajikistan)	Fares Azzouni / Ghassan Hassan-Qadi; Bakhrullo Radjabaliev / Mansur Yakhyaev	1; 6	0; 6

=== Syria vs. United Arab Emirates ===
Syria
3
InterContinental Hotel, Muscat, Oman
26 March 1997

United Arab Emirates
0

			1	2	3
1	(Syria) (United Arab Emirates)	Rabi Bouhassoun; Mahmoud Nader Al-Blooshi	6; 2	6; 2
2	(Syria) (United Arab Emirates)	Dawood Dawoodian; Saeed Hasher Al-Maktoum	6; 2	6; 4
3	(Syria) (United Arab Emirates)	Abdul-Rahim Salim / Lays Salim; Mahmoud Nader Al-Blooshi / Othman Al-Ulama	7; 5	6; 2

=== Oman vs. Jordan ===
Oman
2
InterContinental Hotel, Muscat, Oman
27 March 1997

Jordan
1

			1	2	3
1	(Oman) (Jordan)	Fahad Qamar Al-Hashmi; Fares Azzouni	0; 6	5; 7
2	(Oman) (Jordan)	Mudrik Al-Rawahi; Ahmed Ibrahim Ahmad Alhadid	6; 1	6; 2
3	(Oman) (Jordan)	Khalid Al-Nabhani / Mudrik Al-Rawahi; Fares Azzouni / Ghassan Hassan-Qadi	6; 3	6; 4

=== Brunei vs. United Arab Emirates ===
Brunei
1
InterContinental Hotel, Muscat, Oman
27 March 1997

United Arab Emirates
2

			1	2	3
1	(Brunei) (United Arab Emirates)	Ismasufian Ibrahim; Omar Alawadhi	3; 6	2; 6
2	(Brunei) (United Arab Emirates)	Chua Pheng-chai; Othman Al-Ulama	2; 6	6^{3} 7^{7}
3	(Brunei) (United Arab Emirates)	Felix Chin / Ismasufian Ibrahim; Mahmoud Nader Al-Blooshi / Saeed Hasher Al-Maktoum	6; 3	6; 4

=== Syria vs. Tajikistan ===
Syria
2
InterContinental Hotel, Muscat, Oman
27 March 1997

Tajikistan
1

			1	2	3
1	(Syria) (Tajikistan)	Rabi Bouhassoun; Sergey Makashin	6; 3	7; 5
2	(Syria) (Tajikistan)	Dawood Dawoodian; Mansur Yakhyaev	2; 6	4; 6
3	(Syria) (Tajikistan)	Rabi Bouhassoun / Dawood Dawoodian; Bakhrullo Radjabaliev / Mansur Yakhyaev	6; 3	7^{7} 6^{5}

=== Oman vs. Tajikistan ===
Oman
0
InterContinental Hotel, Muscat, Oman
28 March 1997

Tajikistan
3

			1	2	3
1	(Oman) (Tajikistan)	Fahad Qamar Al-Hashmi; Sergey Makashin	1; 6	0; 6
2	(Oman) (Tajikistan)	Mudrik Al-Rawahi; Mansur Yakhyaev	0; 6	0; 6
3	(Oman) (Tajikistan)	Khalid Al-Nabhani / Mudrik Al-Rawahi; Bakhrullo Radjabaliev / Mansur Yakhyaev	3; 6	0; 6

=== Brunei vs. Syria ===
Brunei
0
InterContinental Hotel, Muscat, Oman
28 March 1997

Syria
3

			1	2	3
1	(Brunei) (Syria)	Suliaman Fauzan; Rabi Bouhassoun	0; 6	2; 6
2	(Brunei) (Syria)	Felix Chin; Dawood Dawoodian	0; 6	3; 6
3	(Brunei) (Syria)	Chua Pheng-chai / Ismasufian Ibrahim; Abdul-Rahim Salim / Lays Salim	6; 2	0; 6	3; 6

=== Jordan vs. United Arab Emirates ===
Jordan
0
InterContinental Hotel, Muscat, Oman
28 March 1997

United Arab Emirates
3

			1	2	3
1	(Jordan) (United Arab Emirates)	Fares Azzouni; Omar Alawadhi	5; 7	6; 4	3; 6
2	(Jordan) (United Arab Emirates)	Ghassan Hassan-Qadi; Othman Al-Ulama	2; 6	6; 3	2; 6
3	(Jordan) (United Arab Emirates)	Tharwat Al-Quasi / Ghassan Hassan-Qadi; Saeed Hasher Al-Maktoum / Omar Alawadhi	3; 6	1; 6

=== Oman vs. Syria ===
Oman
0
InterContinental Hotel, Muscat, Oman
29 March 1997

Syria
3

			1	2	3
1	(Oman) (Syria)	Khalid Al-Nabhani; Rabi Bouhassoun	0; 6	1; 6
2	(Oman) (Syria)	Mudrik Al-Rawahi; Lays Salim	3; 6	6^{2} 7^{7}
3	(Oman) (Syria)	Fahad Qamar Al-Hashmi / Barkat Salim Al-Sharji; Abdul-Rahim Salim / Lays Salim	1; 6	3; 6

=== Brunei vs. Jordan ===
Brunei
2
InterContinental Hotel, Muscat, Oman
29 March 1997

Jordan
1

			1	2	3
1	(Brunei) (Jordan)	Ismasufian Ibrahim; Tharwat Al-Quasi	6; 2	6; 2
2	(Brunei) (Jordan)	Felix Chin; Fares Azzouni	5; 7	0; 6
3	(Brunei) (Jordan)	Chua Pheng-chai / Ismasufian Ibrahim; Fares Azzouni / Ghassan Hassan-Qadi	6; 1	7; 5

=== Tajikistan vs. United Arab Emirates ===
Tajikistan
3
InterContinental Hotel, Muscat, Oman
29 March 1997

United Arab Emirates
0

			1	2	3
1	(Tajikistan) (United Arab Emirates)	Sergey Makashin; Omar Alawadhi	6; 3	6; 4
2	(Tajikistan) (United Arab Emirates)	Mansur Yakhyaev; Othman Al-Ulama	6; 1	6; 1
3	(Tajikistan) (United Arab Emirates)	Sergey Makashin / Mansur Yakhyaev; Mahmoud Nader Al-Blooshi / Saeed Hasher Al-Maktoum	6; 1	6; 3

=== Oman vs. United Arab Emirates ===
Oman

InterContinental Hotel, Muscat, Oman
30 March 1997

United Arab Emirates

		1	2	3
1	(Oman) (United Arab Emirates)				not played
2	(Oman) (United Arab Emirates)				not played
3	(Oman) (United Arab Emirates)				not played

=== Brunei vs. Tajikistan ===
Brunei

InterContinental Hotel, Muscat, Oman
30 March 1997

Tajikistan

		1	2	3
1	(Brunei) (Tajikistan)				not played
2	(Brunei) (Tajikistan)				not played
3	(Brunei) (Tajikistan)				not played

=== Jordan vs. Syria ===
Jordan

InterContinental Hotel, Muscat, Oman
30 March 1997

Syria

		1	2	3
1	(Jordan) (Syria)				not played
2	(Jordan) (Syria)				not played
3	(Jordan) (Syria)				not played
