= Ramayah Ramachandran =

Malaysian tennis player (born 1970)

- Full name: Ramayah Ramachandran
- Country (sports): Malaysia
- Born: 10 September 1970 (age 55) Negeri Sembilan, Malaysia
- Height: 5 ft 3 in (160 cm)
- Prize money: $11,170

Singles
- Career record: 0–2
- Highest ranking: No. 876 (11 January 1993)

Doubles
- Career record: 0–2
- Highest ranking: No. 936 (6 May 1991)

Ramayah Ramachandran (born 10 September 1970) is a Malaysian tennis player.

== Biography ==
Born in Negeri Sembilan, on 10 September 1970, Ramachandran is one of seven siblings and started playing tennis at the age of nine. He learned his tennis at the National Tennis Centre in Kuala Lumpur.

During the 1990s, he was a regular fixture in the Malaysia Davis Cup team, appearing in a total of 21 ties.

Ramachandran was granted a wildcard into two ATP Tour singles main draws in 1993, both for tournaments hosted in Kuala Lumpur.

He was a singles bronze medalist at the 1993 Southeast Asian Games and was a member of the bronze medal-winning Malaysian team at the 1994 Asian Games.
