= Sultan Al-Alawi =

Qatari tennis player (born 1977)

Sultan Khalfan
- Country (sports): Qatar
- Residence: Qatar
- Born: March 16, 1977 (age 49) Qatar
- Turned pro: 1996
- Retired: 2009
- Plays: Right-handed
- Prize money: US$85,177

Singles
- Career record: 0–9 (at ATP Tour level, Grand Slam level, and in Davis Cup)
- Career titles: 0
- Highest ranking: No. 950 (September 18, 2000)

Doubles
- Career record: 0–3 (at ATP Tour level, Grand Slam level, and in Davis Cup)
- Career titles: 0
- Highest ranking: No. 1224 (August 6, 2001)
- Last updated on: December 1, 2011.

Sultan Khalfan Al-Alawi (born March 16, 1977, in Qatar) is a Qatari former professional tennis player. A top junior player in Qatar, runner-up of the International Junior Championships in 1994 and 1995, Khalfan was the most successful member of the Qatar Davis Cup team, playing 59 ties between 1993 and 2009 and compiling a 29–26 record in singles, 19–22 in doubles. He appeared nine times in the Qatar Open draw between 1996 and 2007, losing each time in the first round. Khalfan reached a career-high singles ranking of No. 950 in late 2000.
