= Sri Lanka Davis Cup team =

Tennis team

Sri Lanka
- Nations Ranking: 67
- Colors: Blue & Red
- First year: 1953
- Years played: 57
- Ties played (W–L): 129 (60–69)
- Years in World Group: 0
- Most total wins: Harshana Godamanna (62–24)
- Most singles wins: Harshana Godamanna (38–15)
- Most doubles wins: Rajeev Rajapaske (29–13)
- Best doubles team: Harshana Godamanna / Rajeev Rajapaske (18–5)
- Most ties played: Rajeev Rajapaske (47)
- Most years played: Bernard Pinto (17)

The Sri Lanka Davis Cup team represents Sri Lanka in Davis Cup tennis competition and are governed by the Sri Lanka Tennis Association.

Sri Lanka currently do compete in the Asia/Oceania Zone of Group III. They have reached the semifinals of Group II on five occasions.

== History ==
Sri Lanka competed in its first Davis Cup in 1953 when they took on the Netherlands as Ceylon A first round elimination, kept the nation away for two years until they appeared in the Eastern Asia Zone. In 1958, the team took their first win in Davis Cup history by defeating Malaysia at Singapore. This was their only win until 1966 when they once again defeated Malaysia to make into the Zone B final losing to India 5-0.

In 1983, they made it to the quarterfinals of the Eastern Zone after a win over Hong Kong but they continue to struggle and soon was put in the lower division when the Asia-Oceania draw was split into two. After bungling out in the opening round in 88, Sri Lanka made it to the semifinals between 1989 and 1991. They stayed in Group II until they were relegated by Iran in the play-offs of 1996. Since then they have stayed in Group III except for a brief period in 1999 when they were Group II before falling in 2001 to the lowest group until 2004. A brief period in Group II in 2010 as they qualified by defeating Lebanon before being relegated by Hong Kong dropped them back into Group III where they would only last one year before promoting back into the second division in Asia which they lasted until 2016 where they lost to Indonesia to be relegated back into the third division of Asia.

== Current team (2022) ==
- Harshana Godamanna
- Yasitha de Silva
- Thehan Sanjaya Wijemanne
- Chathurya Nilaweera (Junior player)
- Ashen Minoj Julan Silva

== See also ==
- Davis Cup
- Sri Lanka Billie Jean King Cup team
