= Saudi Arabia Davis Cup team =

National tennis team

The Saudi Arabia Davis Cup team represents Saudi Arabia in Davis Cup tennis competition and are governed by the Saudi Arabian Tennis Federation.

Saudi Arabia currently compete in the Asia/Oceania Zone of Group IV. They have reached Group II on four occasions, but have failed to win a tie at that level.

== History ==
Saudi Arabia competed in its first Davis Cup in 1991.

Total ties Played : 107 ( 53-54 )

Years played : 25 Years

Most total wins : Bader Almugail ( 67 )

Most singles wins : Fahad Alsaad ( 37 wins )

Most doubles wins : Bader Almugai ( 31 wins )

Most ties played : Bader Almugail ( 68 ties )

Most years played : Bader Almugail ( 17 Years )

Oldest player : Bader Almugail ( 39 Years old )

Youngest player : Saud Alhogbani ( 15 Years old )

== Current team (2022) ==
- Anmar Faleh Alhogbani
- Saud Alhogbani
- Abdullah Alfaraj
- Zaid Ahmed
- Zaki Al Abdullah

== See also ==
- Davis Cup
