= Qatar Davis Cup team =

National tennis team

The Qatar Davis Cup team represents Qatar in Davis Cup tennis competition and are governed by the Qatar Tennis Federation.

Qatar currently compete in the Asia/Oceania Zone of Group IV. They won Group III in 1994 and 1997.

== History ==
Qatar competed in its first Davis Cup in 1992.

== Last team (2021) ==
- Sultan Al-Alawi (Captain-player)
- Mashari Nawaf
- Mousa Shanan Zayed
- Rashed Nawaf

== See also ==
- Davis Cup
