= 2005 Davis Cup Asia/Oceania Zone Group IV =

International tennis competition

The Asian and Oceanian Zone is one of the three zones of regional Davis Cup competition in 2005.

In the Asian and Oceanian Zone there are four different groups in which teams compete against each other to advance to the next group.

The Group IV tournament was held April 27–May 1, in Thein Byu Tennis Centre, Yangon, Myanmar, on outdoor hard courts.

== Format ==
There will be a Round Robin where the ten teams will compete in two pools. The winner of each pool will be promoted to the Asia and Oceania Group III in 2006.

== Pool A ==
| | Pool A | BAN | UAE | SYR | KGZ | TKM |
| 1 | Bangladesh (4–0) | | 2–1 | 2–1 | 3–0 | 2–1 |
| 2 | United Arab Emirates (3–1) | 1–2 | | 2–1 | 2–1 | 3–0 |
| 3 | Syria (2–2) | 1–2 | 1–2 | | 3–0 | 3–0 |
| 4 | Kyrgyzstan (1–3) | 0–3 | 1–2 | 0–3 | | 3–0 |
| 5 | Turkmenistan (0–4) | 1–2 | 0–3 | 0–3 | 0–3 | |

- Bangladesh advances to Asia/Oceania Group III in 2006.

=== United Arab Emirates vs. Turkmenistan ===
United Arab Emirates
3
Thein Byu Tennis Centre, Yangon, Myanmar
27 April 2005
Hard

Turkmenistan
0

| | | | 1 | 2 | 3 |
|---|---|---|---|---|---|
| 1 | (United Arab Emirates) (Turkmenistan) | Mohammed Abdel-Aziz Al Nuaimi; Stanislav Naydyonov | 6; 1 | 6; 4 |
| 2 | (United Arab Emirates) (Turkmenistan) | Omar Alawadhi; Myalikkuli Mamedkuliyev | 6; 0 | 6; 1 |
| 3 | (United Arab Emirates) (Turkmenistan) | Mahmoud Nader Al Blooshi / Omar Alawadhi; Dovran Chagylov / Myalikkuli Mamedkuliyev | 7; 5 | 6; 4 |

=== Syria vs. Bangladesh ===
Syria
1
Thein Byu Tennis Centre, Yangon, Myanmar
27 April 2005
Hard

Bangladesh
2

| | | | 1 | 2 | 3 |
|---|---|---|---|---|---|
| 1 | (Syria) (Bangladesh) | Lays Salim; Shibu Lal | 6; 2 | 4; 6 | 7; 5 |
| 2 | (Syria) (Bangladesh) | Abraham Ibrahim; Sree-Amol Roy | 1; 6 | 2; 6 |
| 3 | (Syria) (Bangladesh) | Lays Salim / Yashar Sheet; Shibu Lal / Sree-Amol Roy | 2; 6 | 6^{4} 7^{7} |

=== United Arab Emirates vs. Kyrgyzstan ===
United Arab Emirates
2
Thein Byu Tennis Centre, Yangon, Myanmar
28 April 2005
Hard

Kyrgyzstan
1

| | | | 1 | 2 | 3 |
|---|---|---|---|---|---|
| 1 | (United Arab Emirates) (Kyrgyzstan) | Mahmoud Nader Al Blooshi; Ruslan Eshmuhamedov | 6; 4 | 6; 3 |
| 2 | (United Arab Emirates) (Kyrgyzstan) | Omar Alawadhi; Sergei Ni | 7^{7} 6^{3} | 6; 0 |
| 3 | (United Arab Emirates) (Kyrgyzstan) | Ghanem Al Hassani / Mohammed Abdel-Aziz Al Nuaimi; Boris Baichorov / Anton Litvinov | 0; 6 | 2; 6 |

=== Syria vs. Turkmenistan ===
Syria
3
Thein Byu Tennis Centre, Yangon, Myanmar
28 April 2005
Hard

Turkmenistan
0

| | | | 1 | 2 | 3 |
|---|---|---|---|---|---|
| 1 | (Syria) (Turkmenistan) | Lays Salim; Stanislav Naydyonov | 6; 3 | 6; 1 |
| 2 | (Syria) (Turkmenistan) | Abraham Ibrahim; Myalikkuli Mamedkuliyev | 6; 2 | 6; 2 |
| 3 | (Syria) (Turkmenistan) | Lays Salim / Yashar Sheet; Dovran Chagylov / Myalikkuli Mamedkuliyev | 6; 2 | 6; 2 |

=== United Arab Emirates vs. Bangladesh ===
United Arab Emirates
1
Thein Byu Tennis Centre, Yangon, Myanmar
29 April 2005
Hard

Bangladesh
2

| | | | 1 | 2 | 3 |
|---|---|---|---|---|---|---|
| 1 | (United Arab Emirates) (Bangladesh) | Mahmoud Nader Al Blooshi; Shibu Lal | 6; 3 | 5; 6 | | retired |
| 2 | (United Arab Emirates) (Bangladesh) | Omar Alawadhi; Sree-Amol Roy | 1; 6 | 4; 6 |
| 3 | (United Arab Emirates) (Bangladesh) | Mohammed Abdel-Aziz Al Nuaimi / Omar Alawadhi; Shibu Lal / Sree-Amol Roy | 6; 3 | 2; 6 | 6; 3 |

=== Kyrgyzstan vs. Turkmenistan ===
Kyrgyzstan
3
Thein Byu Tennis Centre, Yangon, Myanmar
29 April 2005
Hard

Turkmenistan
0

| | | | 1 | 2 | 3 |
|---|---|---|---|---|---|
| 1 | (Kyrgyzstan) (Turkmenistan) | Boris Baichorov; Dovran Chagylov | 6; 2 | 6; 3 |
| 2 | (Kyrgyzstan) (Turkmenistan) | Sergei Ni; Myalikkuli Mamedkuliyev | 7; 5 | 6; 0 |
| 3 | (Kyrgyzstan) (Turkmenistan) | Ruslan Eshmuhamedov / Anton Litvinov; Dovran Chagylov / Myalikkuli Mamedkuliyev | 7; 5 | 6; 1 |

=== Syria vs. Kyrgyzstan ===
Syria
3
Thein Byu Tennis Centre, Yangon, Myanmar
30 April 2005
Hard

Kyrgyzstan
0

| | | | 1 | 2 | 3 |
|---|---|---|---|---|---|
| 1 | (Syria) (Kyrgyzstan) | Lays Salim; Boris Baichorov | 3; 6 | 6; 1 | 6; 1 |
| 2 | (Syria) (Kyrgyzstan) | Abraham Ibrahim; Sergei Ni | 6; 4 | 7; 5 |
| 3 | (Syria) (Kyrgyzstan) | Hayan Maarouf / Yashar Sheet; Boris Baichorov / Anton Litvinov | 7^{7} 6^{4} | 7^{7} 6^{3} |

=== Bangladesh vs. Turkmenistan ===
Bangladesh
2
Thein Byu Tennis Centre, Yangon, Myanmar
30 April 2005
Hard

Turkmenistan
1

| | | | 1 | 2 | 3 |
|---|---|---|---|---|---|
| 1 | (Bangladesh) (Turkmenistan) | Shibu Lal; Stanislav Naydyonov | 6; 1 | 6; 0 |
| 2 | (Bangladesh) (Turkmenistan) | Sree-Amol Roy; Myalikkuli Mamedkuliyev | 6; 1 | 6; 2 |
| 3 | (Bangladesh) (Turkmenistan) | Mohammed-Alamgir Hossain / Dipu Lal; Dovran Chagylov / Myalikkuli Mamedkuliyev | 7; 5 | 3; 6 | 4; 6 |

=== United Arab Emirates vs. Syria ===
United Arab Emirates
2
Thein Byu Tennis Centre, Yangon, Myanmar
1 May 2005
Hard

Syria
1

| | | | 1 | 2 | 3 |
|---|---|---|---|---|---|
| 1 | (United Arab Emirates) (Syria) | Mohammed Abdel-Aziz Al Nuaimi; Lays Salim | 7; 5 | 6^{7} 7^{9} | 6; 3 |
| 2 | (United Arab Emirates) (Syria) | Omar Alawadhi; Abraham Ibrahim | 6; 1 | 6; 2 |
| 3 | (United Arab Emirates) (Syria) | Mohammed Abdel-Aziz Al Nuaimi / Omar Alawadhi; Hayan Maarouf / Yashar Sheet | 6; 3 | 3; 6 | 2; 6 |

=== Kyrgyzstan vs. Bangladesh ===
Kyrgyzstan
0
Thein Byu Tennis Centre, Yangon, Myanmar
1 May 2005
Hard

Bangladesh
3

| | | | 1 | 2 | 3 |
|---|---|---|---|---|---|
| 1 | (Kyrgyzstan) (Bangladesh) | Anton Litvinov; Shibu Lal | 3; 6 | 4; 6 |
| 2 | (Kyrgyzstan) (Bangladesh) | Sergei Ni; Sree-Amol Roy | 1; 6 | 3; 6 |
| 3 | (Kyrgyzstan) (Bangladesh) | Anton Litvinov / Sergei Ni; Mohammed-Alamgir Hossain / Shibu Lal | 3; 6 | 7^{7} 6^{5} | 4; 6 |

== Pool B ==
| | Pool B | SIN | OMA | MYA | JOR | IRQ |
| 1 | Singapore (4–0) | | 2–1 | 3–0 | 2–1 | 3–0 |
| 2 | Oman (3–1) | 1–2 | | 3–0 | 3–0 | 3–0 |
| 3 | Myanmar (2–2) | 0–3 | 0–3 | | 3–0 | 3–0 |
| 4 | Jordan (1–3) | 1–2 | 0–3 | 0–3 | | 3–0 |
| 5 | Iraq (0–4) | 0–3 | 0–3 | 0–3 | 0–3 | |

- Singapore advances to Asia/Oceania Group III in 2006.

=== Oman vs. Myanmar ===
Oman
3
Thein Byu Tennis Centre, Yangon, Myanmar
27 April 2005
Hard

Myanmar
0

| | | | 1 | 2 | 3 |
|---|---|---|---|---|---|---|
| 1 | (Oman) (Myanmar) | Mohammed Al Nabhani; Zaw-Zaw Latt | 6^{4} 7^{7} | 4; 2 | | retired |
| 2 | (Oman) (Myanmar) | Khalid Al Nabhani; Maung-Tu Maw | 6^{5} 7^{7} | 7; 5 | 6; 0 |
| 3 | (Oman) (Myanmar) | Khalid Al Nabhani / Mohammed Al Nabhani; Min Min / Hla-Win Naing | 7; 5 | 6; 2 |

=== Singapore vs. Iraq ===
Singapore
3
Thein Byu Tennis Centre, Yangon, Myanmar
27 April 2005
Hard

Iraq
0

| | | | 1 | 2 | 3 |
|---|---|---|---|---|---|
| 1 | (Singapore) (Iraq) | Kok-Huen Kam; Akram M Abdalkarem Al-Saadi | 6; 3 | 6; 2 |
| 2 | (Singapore) (Iraq) | Stanley Armando; Nasir Al Hatam | 6; 1 | 3; 6 | 6; 2 |
| 3 | (Singapore) (Iraq) | Daniel Heryanta Dewandaka / Ming-Chye Lim; Akram M Abdalkarem Al-Saadi / Hussain Rasheed | 6; 1 | 6; 2 |

=== Oman vs. Jordan ===
Oman
3
Thein Byu Tennis Centre, Yangon, Myanmar
28 April 2005
Hard

Jordan
0

| | | | 1 | 2 | 3 |
|---|---|---|---|---|---|
| 1 | (Oman) (Jordan) | Mohammed Al Nabhani; Ahmed Ibrahim Ahmad Alhadid | 6; 2 | 6; 2 |
| 2 | (Oman) (Jordan) | Khalid Al Nabhani; Tareq Talal Shkakwa | 6; 2 | 6; 3 |
| 3 | (Oman) (Jordan) | Khalid Al Nabhani / Mohammed Al Nabhani; Mohammed-Khair Al Hadid / Ahmed Tbayshat | 6; 2 | 6; 2 |

=== Singapore vs. Myanmar ===
Singapore
3
Thein Byu Tennis Centre, Yangon, Myanmar
28 April 2005
Hard

Myanmar
0

| | | | 1 | 2 | 3 |
|---|---|---|---|---|---|
| 1 | (Singapore) (Myanmar) | Kok-Huen Kam; Min Min | 7; 5 | 6; 4 |
| 2 | (Singapore) (Myanmar) | Stanley Armando; Maung-Tu Maw | 7; 5 | 7; 5 |
| 3 | (Singapore) (Myanmar) | Daniel Heryanta Dewandaka / Ming-Chye Lim; Zaw-Zaw Latt / Maung-Tu Maw | 4; 6 | 6; 2 | 6; 4 |

=== Oman vs. Iraq ===
Oman
3
Thein Byu Tennis Centre, Yangon, Myanmar
29 April 2005
Hard

Iraq
0

| | | | 1 | 2 | 3 |
|---|---|---|---|---|---|
| 1 | (Oman) (Iraq) | Mohammed Al Nabhani; Akram M Abdalkarem Al-Saadi | 7; 5 | 6; 3 |
| 2 | (Oman) (Iraq) | Khalid Al Nabhani; Nasir Al Hatam | 6; 2 | 7^{10} 6^{8} |
| 3 | (Oman) (Iraq) | Khalid Al Nabhani / Mohammed Al Nabhani; Akram M Abdalkarem Al-Saadi / Hussain Rasheed | 6; 3 | 6; 3 |

=== Jordan vs. Myanmar ===
Jordan
0
Thein Byu Tennis Centre, Yangon, Myanmar
29 April 2005
Hard

Myanmar
3

| | | | 1 | 2 | 3 |
|---|---|---|---|---|---|
| 1 | (Jordan) (Myanmar) | Ahmed Ibrahim Ahmad Alhadid; Zaw-Zaw Latt | 6^{2} 7^{7} | 0; 6 |
| 2 | (Jordan) (Myanmar) | Tareq Talal Shkakwa; Maung-Tu Maw | 3; 6 | 5; 7 |
| 3 | (Jordan) (Myanmar) | Mohammed-Khair Al Hadid / Ahmed Tbayshat; Min Min / Hla-Win Naing | 2; 6 | 6; 4 | 3; 6 |

=== Singapore vs. Jordan ===
Singapore
2
Thein Byu Tennis Centre, Yangon, Myanmar
30 April 2005
Hard

Jordan
1

| | | | 1 | 2 | 3 |
|---|---|---|---|---|---|
| 1 | (Singapore) (Jordan) | Kok-Huen Kam; Ahmed Ibrahim Ahmad Alhadid | 4; 6 | 6^{5} 7^{7} |
| 2 | (Singapore) (Jordan) | Stanley Armando; Tareq Talal Shkakwa | 6; 3 | 6; 2 |
| 3 | (Singapore) (Jordan) | Daniel Heryanta Dewandaka / Ming-Chye Lim; Ahmed Ibrahim Ahmad Alhadid / Tareq Talal Shkakwa | 6; 0 | 6; 1 |

=== Iraq vs. Myanmar ===
Iraq
0
Thein Byu Tennis Centre, Yangon, Myanmar
30 April 2005
Hard

Myanmar
3

| | | | 1 | 2 | 3 |
|---|---|---|---|---|---|
| 1 | (Iraq) (Myanmar) | Hussain Rasheed; Zaw-Zaw Latt | 1; 6 | 0; 6 |
| 2 | (Iraq) (Myanmar) | Nasir Al Hatam; Maung-Tu Maw | 2; 6 | 3; 6 |
| 3 | (Iraq) (Myanmar) | Nasir Al Hatam / Hussain Rasheed; Min Min / Hla-Win Naing | 3; 6 | 6^{6} 7^{8} |

=== Oman vs. Singapore ===
Oman
1
Thein Byu Tennis Centre, Yangon, Myanmar
1 May 2005
Hard

Singapore
2

| | | | 1 | 2 | 3 |
|---|---|---|---|---|---|
| 1 | (Oman) (Singapore) | Mohammed Al Nabhani; Daniel Heryanta Dewandaka | 4; 6 | 4; 6 |
| 2 | (Oman) (Singapore) | Khalid Al Nabhani; Stanley Armando | 7; 5 | 6; 3 |
| 3 | (Oman) (Singapore) | Khalid Al Nabhani / Mohammed Al Nabhani; Stanley Armando / Daniel Heryanta Dewandaka | 2; 6 | 6; 2 | 5; 7 |

=== Jordan vs. Iraq ===
Jordan
3
Thein Byu Tennis Centre, Yangon, Myanmar
1 May 2005
Hard

Iraq
0

| | | | 1 | 2 | 3 |
|---|---|---|---|---|---|
| 1 | (Jordan) (Iraq) | Ahmed Ibrahim Ahmad Alhadid; Akram M Abdalkarem Al-Saadi | 6; 3 | 6; 2 |
| 2 | (Jordan) (Iraq) | Tareq Talal Shkakwa; Nasir Al Hatam | 6; 3 | 6; 1 |
| 3 | (Jordan) (Iraq) | Mohammed-Khair Al Hadid / Ahmed Tbayshat; Hussain Rasheed / Mohammed Salman | 6; 1 | 6^{3} 7^{7} | 6; 2 |
