= 2004 Davis Cup Asia/Oceania Zone Group IV =

International tennis competition

The Asian and Oceanian Zone is one of the three zones of regional Davis Cup competition in 2004.

In the Asian and Oceanian Zone there are four different groups in which teams compete against each other to advance to the next group.

The Group IV tournament was held April 7–11, in Al Hussein Sport City, Amman, Jordan, on outdoor hard courts.

== Format ==
There will be a Round Robin where the eleven teams will compete in two pools. The winner of each pool will be promoted to the Asia and Oceania Group III in 2005.

== Pool A ==
	Pool A	KSA	SIN	JOR	UAE	BRU	TKM
1	Saudi Arabia (4–1)		3–0	2–1	0–3	3–0	3–0
2	Singapore (4–1)	0–3		2–1	2–1	3–0	3–0
3	Jordan (3–2)	1–2	1–2		2–1	3–0	2–1
4	United Arab Emirates (3–2)	3–0	1–2	1–2		3–0	2–1
5	Brunei (1–4)	0–3	0–3	0–3	0–3		2–1
6	Turkmenistan (0–5)	0–3	0–3	1–2	1–2	1–2	

- Saudi Arabia advances to Asia/Oceania Group III in 2005.

=== United Arab Emirates vs. Brunei ===
United Arab Emirates
3
Al Hussein Sport City, Amman, Jordan
7 April 2004
Hard

Brunei
0

			1	2	3
1	(United Arab Emirates) (Brunei)	Mahmoud Nader Al Blooshi; Ian Chok	6; 0	6; 4
2	(United Arab Emirates) (Brunei)	Omar Alawadhi; Sie-Lu On	6; 0	6; 2
3	(United Arab Emirates) (Brunei)	Mahmoud Nader Al Blooshi / Omar Alawadhi; Nelson Cheong / Sie-Lu On	6; 0	6; 0

=== Singapore vs. Saudi Arabia ===
Singapore
0
Al Hussein Sport City, Amman, Jordan
7 April 2004
Hard

Saudi Arabia
3

			1	2	3
1	(Singapore) (Saudi Arabia)	Kok-Huen Kam; Omar Althagib	0; 6	7^{7} 6^{0}	4; 6
2	(Singapore) (Saudi Arabia)	Jensen Hiu; Fahad Al Saad	3; 6	4; 6
3	(Singapore) (Saudi Arabia)	Daniel Heryanta Dewandaka / Jensen Hiu; Saleh Alrajeh / Fahad Al Saad	6; 4	4; 6	4; 6

=== Jordan vs. Turkmenistan ===
Jordan
2
Al Hussein Sport City, Amman, Jordan
7 April 2004
Hard

Turkmenistan
1

			1	2	3
1	(Jordan) (Turkmenistan)	Ahmed Ibrahim Ahmad Alhadid; Dovran Chagylov	6; 0	6; 3
2	(Jordan) (Turkmenistan)	Khaled Naffa; Myalikkuli Mamedkuliyev	6; 4	4; 6	4; 6
3	(Jordan) (Turkmenistan)	Ahmed Ibrahim Ahmad Alhadid / Khaled Naffa; Dovran Chagylov / Myalikkuli Mamedkuliyev	6; 2	6; 2

=== United Arab Emirates vs. Jordan ===
United Arab Emirates
1
Al Hussein Sport City, Amman, Jordan
8 April 2004
Hard

Jordan
2

			1	2	3
1	(United Arab Emirates) (Jordan)	Mahmoud Nader Al Blooshi; Ahmed Ibrahim Ahmad Alhadid	4; 6	5; 7
2	(United Arab Emirates) (Jordan)	Omar Alawadhi; Khaled Naffa	3; 6	1; 6
3	(United Arab Emirates) (Jordan)	Mahmoud Nader Al Blooshi / Omar Alawadhi; Fabio Badra / Tareq Talal Shkakwa	6; 2	6; 3

=== Singapore vs. Turkmenistan ===
Singapore
3
Al Hussein Sport City, Amman, Jordan
8 April 2004
Hard

Turkmenistan
0

			1	2	3
1	(Singapore) (Turkmenistan)	Kok-Huen Kam; Stanislav Naydyonov	6; 2	6; 4
2	(Singapore) (Turkmenistan)	Jensen Hiu; Myalikkuli Mamedkuliyev	6; 0	6; 4
3	(Singapore) (Turkmenistan)	Sun-Gin Chew / Daniel Heryanta Dewandaka; Dovran Chagylov / Stanislav Naydyonov	7^{7} 6^{2}	6; 0

=== Saudi Arabia vs. Brunei ===
Saudi Arabia
3
Al Hussein Sport City, Amman, Jordan
8 April 2004
Hard

Brunei
0

			1	2	3
1	(Saudi Arabia) (Brunei)	Omar Althagib; Ian Chok	6; 2	6; 0
2	(Saudi Arabia) (Brunei)	Fahad Al Saad; Sie-Lu On	6; 4	6; 1
3	(Saudi Arabia) (Brunei)	Saleh Alrajeh / Omar Althagib; Ian Chok / Ismasufian Ibrahim	6; 1	6; 2

=== United Arab Emirates vs. Saudi Arabia ===
United Arab Emirates
3
Al Hussein Sport City, Amman, Jordan
9 April 2004
Hard

Saudi Arabia
0

			1	2	3
1	(United Arab Emirates) (Saudi Arabia)	Mahmoud Nader Al Blooshi; Omar Althagib	6; 2	6; 4
2	(United Arab Emirates) (Saudi Arabia)	Omar Alawadhi; Fahad Al Saad	6; 4	6; 4
3	(United Arab Emirates) (Saudi Arabia)	Mahmoud Nader Al Blooshi / Omar Alawadhi; Fahad Al Saad / Omar Althagib	2; 6	6; 2	6; 3

=== Singapore vs. Jordan ===
Singapore
2
Al Hussein Sport City, Amman, Jordan
9 April 2004
Hard

Jordan
1

			1	2	3
1	(Singapore) (Jordan)	Daniel Heryanta Dewandaka; Ahmed Ibrahim Ahmad Alhadid	6; 3	6; 2
2	(Singapore) (Jordan)	Jensen Hiu; Khaled Naffa	6^{6} 7^{8}	4; 6
3	(Singapore) (Jordan)	Daniel Heryanta Dewandaka / Jensen Hiu; Ahmed Ibrahim Ahmad Alhadid / Khaled Naffa	6; 3	6; 1

=== Turkmenistan vs. Brunei ===
Turkmenistan
1
Al Hussein Sport City, Amman, Jordan
9 April 2004
Hard

Brunei
2

			1	2	3
1	(Turkmenistan) (Brunei)	Dovran Chagylov; Ian Chok	1; 6	3; 6
2	(Turkmenistan) (Brunei)	Myalikkuli Mamedkuliyev; Sie-Lu On	6; 2	6; 0
3	(Turkmenistan) (Brunei)	Myalikkuli Mamedkuliyev / Stanislav Naydyonov; Ian Chok / Ismasufian Ibrahim	1; 6	4; 6

=== United Arab Emirates vs. Singapore ===
United Arab Emirates
1
Al Hussein Sport City, Amman, Jordan
10 April 2004
Hard

Singapore
2

			1	2	3
1	(United Arab Emirates) (Singapore)	Mahmoud Khalifa Al Blooshi; Daniel Heryanta Dewandaka	3; 6	1; 6
2	(United Arab Emirates) (Singapore)	Omar Alawadhi; Jensen Hiu	6; 3	2; 6	6; 3
3	(United Arab Emirates) (Singapore)	Mahmoud Khalifa Al Blooshi / Omar Alawadhi; Daniel Heryanta Dewandaka / Jensen Hiu	6; 2	0; 6	2; 6

=== Saudi Arabia vs. Turkmenistan ===
Saudi Arabia
3
Al Hussein Sport City, Amman, Jordan
10 April 2004
Hard

Turkmenistan
0

			1	2	3
1	(Saudi Arabia) (Turkmenistan)	Omar Althagib; Stanislav Naydyonov	6; 0	6; 1
2	(Saudi Arabia) (Turkmenistan)	Fahad Al Saad; Myalikkuli Mamedkuliyev	6; 4	3; 6	6; 4
3	(Saudi Arabia) (Turkmenistan)	Majid Al Jaroudi / Saleh Alrajeh; Dovran Chagylov / Stanislav Naydyonov	6; 4	6; 3

=== Jordan vs. Brunei ===
Jordan
3
Al Hussein Sport City, Amman, Jordan
10 April 2004
Hard

Brunei
0

			1	2	3
1	(Jordan) (Brunei)	Fabio Badra; Nelson Cheong	6; 0	6; 0
2	(Jordan) (Brunei)	Khaled Naffa; Ian Chok	6; 0	6; 2
3	(Jordan) (Brunei)	Fabio Badra / Khaled Naffa; Ismasufian Ibrahim / Sie-Lu On	6; 4	6; 3

=== United Arab Emirates vs. Turkmenistan ===
United Arab Emirates
2
Al Hussein Sport City, Amman, Jordan
11 April 2004
Hard

Turkmenistan
1

			1	2	3
1	(United Arab Emirates) (Turkmenistan)	Mahmoud Khalifa Al Blooshi; Stanislav Naydyonov	6; 0	6; 0
2	(United Arab Emirates) (Turkmenistan)	Omar Alawadhi; Dovran Chagylov	6; 2	6; 2
3	(United Arab Emirates) (Turkmenistan)	Mahmoud Khalifa Al Blooshi / Mohammed-Saeed Al Merri; Dovran Chagylov / Stanislav Naydyonov	2; 6	5; 7

=== Singapore vs. Brunei ===
Singapore
3
Al Hussein Sport City, Amman, Jordan
11 April 2004
Hard

Brunei
0

			1	2	3
1	(Singapore) (Brunei)	Kok-Huen Kam; Nelson Cheong	6; 1	6; 1
2	(Singapore) (Brunei)	Jensen Hiu; Ian Chok	6; 1	6; 1
3	(Singapore) (Brunei)	Sun-Gin Chew / Kok-Huen Kam; Nelson Cheong / Sie-Lu On	6; 2	6; 1

=== Saudi Arabia vs. Jordan ===
Saudi Arabia
2
Al Hussein Sport City, Amman, Jordan
11 April 2004
Hard

Jordan
1

			1	2	3
1	(Saudi Arabia) (Jordan)	Omar Althagib; Ahmed Ibrahim Ahmad Alhadid	6; 0	7^{7} 6^{1}
2	(Saudi Arabia) (Jordan)	Fahad Al Saad; Khaled Naffa	6; 3	6; 2
3	(Saudi Arabia) (Jordan)	Majid Al Jaroudi / Saleh Alrajeh; Fabio Badra / Tareq Talal Shkakwa	4; 6	2; 6

== Pool B ==
	Pool B	SRI	BAN	MYA	KGZ	IRQ
1	Sri Lanka (4–0)		3–0	2–1	3–0	3–0
2	Bangladesh (3–1)	0–3		2–1	3–0	3–0
3	Myanmar (1–3)	1–2	1–2		2–1	1–2
4	Kyrgyzstan (1–3)	0–3	0–3	1–2		2–1
5	Iraq (1–3)	0–3	0–3	2–1	1–2	

- Sri Lanka advances to Asia/Oceania Group III in 2005

=== Sri Lanka vs. Bangladesh ===
Sri Lanka
3
Al Hussein Sport City, Amman, Jordan
7 April 2004
Hard

Bangladesh
0

			1	2	3
1	(Sri Lanka) (Bangladesh)	Renouk Wijemanne; Sree-Amol Roy	6; 3	6; 1
2	(Sri Lanka) (Bangladesh)	Franklyn Emmanuel; Shibu Lal	6; 0	6; 4
3	(Sri Lanka) (Bangladesh)	Rohan de Silva / Rajeev Rajapakse; Mohammed-Alamgir Hossain / Shibu Lal	7^{11} 6^{9}	7; 5

=== Kyrgyzstan vs. Myanmar ===
Kyrgyzstan
1
Al Hussein Sport City, Amman, Jordan
7 April 2004
Hard

Myanmar
2

			1	2	3
1	(Kyrgyzstan) (Myanmar)	Boris Baichorov; Zaw-Zaw Latt	6; 4	6; 2
2	(Kyrgyzstan) (Myanmar)	Eduard Koifman; Maung-Tu Maw	1; 6	0; 6
3	(Kyrgyzstan) (Myanmar)	Temir Akkaziev / Boris Baichorov; Zaw-Zaw Latt / Maung-Tu Maw	1; 6	4; 6

=== Sri Lanka vs. Iraq ===
Sri Lanka
3
Al Hussein Sport City, Amman, Jordan
8 April 2004
Hard

Iraq
0

			1	2	3
1	(Sri Lanka) (Iraq)	Renouk Wijemanne; Nasir Al Hatam	6; 1	6; 0
2	(Sri Lanka) (Iraq)	Franklyn Emmanuel; Haidar Kadhim	6; 0	6; 1
3	(Sri Lanka) (Iraq)	Rohan de Silva / Rajeev Rajapakse; Haidar Kadhim / Hussain Rasheed	6; 4	6; 2

=== Kyrgyzstan vs. Bangladesh ===
Kyrgyzstan
0
Al Hussein Sport City, Amman, Jordan
8 April 2004
Hard

Bangladesh
3

			1	2	3
1	(Kyrgyzstan) (Bangladesh)	Sergei Ni; Sree-Amol Roy	3; 6	1; 6
2	(Kyrgyzstan) (Bangladesh)	Boris Baichorov; Shibu Lal	2; 6	4; 6
3	(Kyrgyzstan) (Bangladesh)	Temir Akkaziev / Eduard Koifman; Shibu Lal / Sree-Amol Roy	3; 6	3; 6

=== Sri Lanka vs. Myanmar ===
Sri Lanka
2
Al Hussein Sport City, Amman, Jordan
9 April 2004
Hard

Myanmar
1

			1	2	3
1	(Sri Lanka) (Myanmar)	Renouk Wijemanne; Zaw-Zaw Latt	6; 4	6; 3
2	(Sri Lanka) (Myanmar)	Franklyn Emmanuel; Maung-Tu Maw	6; 3	4; 6	4; 6
3	(Sri Lanka) (Myanmar)	Rohan de Silva / Rajeev Rajapakse; Zaw-Zaw Latt / Maung-Tu Maw	6; 1	6; 1

=== Bangladesh vs. Iraq ===
Bangladesh
3
Al Hussein Sport City, Amman, Jordan
9 April 2004
Hard

Iraq
0

			1	2	3
1	(Bangladesh) (Iraq)	Sree-Amol Roy; Haidar Kadhim	6; 0	6; 2
2	(Bangladesh) (Iraq)	Shibu Lal; Hussain Rasheed	6; 2	6; 1
3	(Bangladesh) (Iraq)	Shibu Lal / Sree-Amol Roy; Haidar Kadhim / Hussain Rasheed	6; 0	6; 1

=== Kyrgyzstan vs. Iraq ===
Kyrgyzstan
2
Al Hussein Sport City, Amman, Jordan
10 April 2004
Hard

Iraq
1

			1	2	3
1	(Kyrgyzstan) (Iraq)	Boris Baichorov; Akram M Abdalkarem Al-Saadi	6; 2	3; 6	6; 3
2	(Kyrgyzstan) (Iraq)	Eduard Koifman; Nasir Al Hatam	3; 6	4; 6
3	(Kyrgyzstan) (Iraq)	Temir Akkaziev / Boris Baichorov; Nasir Al Hatam / Haidar Kadhim	7; 5	6; 3

=== Bangladesh vs. Myanmar ===
Bangladesh
2
Al Hussein Sport City, Amman, Jordan
10 April 2004
Hard

Myanmar
1

			1	2	3
1	(Bangladesh) (Myanmar)	Sree-Amol Roy; Zaw-Zaw Latt	7; 5	6; 2
2	(Bangladesh) (Myanmar)	Shibu Lal; Maung-Tu Maw	6; 2	6; 3
3	(Bangladesh) (Myanmar)	Shibu Lal / Sree-Amol Roy; Zaw-Zaw Latt / Min Min	5; 7	6^{5} 7^{7}

=== Sri Lanka vs. Kyrgyzstan ===
Sri Lanka
3
Al Hussein Sport City, Amman, Jordan
11 April 2004
Hard

Kyrgyzstan
0

			1	2	3
1	(Sri Lanka) (Kyrgyzstan)	Renouk Wijemanne; Temir Akkaziev	6; 0	6; 3
2	(Sri Lanka) (Kyrgyzstan)	Franklyn Emmanuel; Sergei Ni	6; 4	6; 2
3	(Sri Lanka) (Kyrgyzstan)	Rohan de Silva / Rajeev Rajapakse; Temir Akkaziev / Sergei Ni	6; 2	6; 0

=== Iraq vs. Myanmar ===
Iraq
2
Al Hussein Sport City, Amman, Jordan
11 April 2004
Hard

Myanmar
1

			1	2	3
1	(Iraq) (Myanmar)	Akram M Abdalkarem Al-Saadi; Lyan-Sein Man	6; 3	3; 6	7; 5
2	(Iraq) (Myanmar)	Hussain Rasheed; Zaw-Zaw Latt	1; 6	2; 6
3	(Iraq) (Myanmar)	Nasir Al Hatam / Haidar Kadhim; Zaw-Zaw Latt / Min Min	4; 6	7^{7} 6^{3}	11; 9
