= 1998 Davis Cup Asia/Oceania Zone Group IV =

International tennis competition

The Asia/Oceania Zone was one of the three zones of the regional Davis Cup competition in 1998.

In the Asia/Oceania Zone there were four different tiers, called groups, in which teams competed against each other to advance to the upper tier. The top two teams in Group IV advanced to the Asia/Oceania Zone Group III in 1999. All other teams remained in Group IV.

== Participating nations ==
- Bahrain
- Bangladesh
- Brunei
- Iraq
- Jordan
- Oman
- United Arab Emirates

=== Draw ===
- Venue: National Complex, Ramna Park, Dhaka, Bangladesh
- Date: 9–15 February

	BHR	BAN	IRQ	JOR	OMA	UAE	BRU	RR; W–L	Match; W–L	Set; W–L	Standings
Bahrain		2–1	2–1	2–1	3–0	3–0	3–0	6–0	15–3 (83%)	32–9 (78%)	1
Bangladesh	1–2		3–0	2–1	2–1	3–0	3–0	5–1	14–4 (78%)	31–13 (70%)	2
Iraq	1–2	0–3		3–0	2–1	3–0	3–0	4–2	12–6 (67%)	26–14 (65%)	3
Jordan	1–2	1–2	0–3		2–1	3–0	3–0	3–3	10–8 (56%)	22–17 (56%)	4
Oman	0–3	1–2	1–2	1–2		2–1	2–1	2–4	7–11 (39%)	14–24 (37%)	5
United Arab Emirates	0–3	0–3	0–3	0–3	1–2		2–1	1–5	3–15 (17%)	8–29 (22%)	6
Brunei	0–3	0–3	0–3	0–3	1–2	1–2		0–6	2–16 (11%)	5–32 (14%)	7

- Bahrain and Bangladesh promoted to Group III in 1999.

== Results ==
=== Bangladesh vs. Oman ===
Bangladesh
2
National Complex, Ramna Park, Dhaka, Bangladesh
9 February 1998

Oman
1

			1	2	3
1	(Bangladesh) (Oman)	Dilip Passia; Mudrik Al-Rawahi	5; 7	6; 3	2; 6
2	(Bangladesh) (Oman)	Shibu Lal; Khalid Al-Nabhani	6; 1	6; 0
3	(Bangladesh) (Oman)	Shibu Lal / Moinuddin Walliullah; Khalid Al-Nabhani / Mudrik Al-Rawahi	6; 3	6; 2

=== Bahrain vs. United Arab Emirates ===
Bahrain
3
National Complex, Ramna Park, Dhaka, Bangladesh
9 February 1998

United Arab Emirates
0

			1	2	3
1	(Bahrain) (United Arab Emirates)	Esam Abdulaal; Mahmoud Nader Al-Blooshi	6; 1	6; 0
2	(Bahrain) (United Arab Emirates)	Abdul-Latif Ahmed; Othman Al-Ulama	6; 3	6; 1
3	(Bahrain) (United Arab Emirates)	Abdul-Latif Ahmed / Mohammed Jasim Sanad Ahmed; Mahmoud Nader Al-Blooshi / Mohammed-Jamal Buschager	6; 1	6; 0

=== Brunei vs. Iraq ===
Brunei
0
National Complex, Ramna Park, Dhaka, Bangladesh
9 February 1998

Iraq
3

			1	2	3
1	(Brunei) (Iraq)	Ismasufian Ibrahim; Mohammed-Ahmed Ibrahim	3; 6	1; 6
2	(Brunei) (Iraq)	Tony Shim; Saddam-Hussain Kadhim	0; 6	1; 6
3	(Brunei) (Iraq)	Ismasufian Ibrahim / Bin-Latif Isa; Saddam-Hussain Kadhim / Hussain Rasheed	4; 6	2; 6

=== Bangladesh vs. United Arab Emirates ===
Bangladesh
3
National Complex, Ramna Park, Dhaka, Bangladesh
10 February 1998

United Arab Emirates
0

			1	2	3
1	(Bangladesh) (United Arab Emirates)	Dilip Passia; Mahmoud Nader Al-Blooshi	6; 2	6; 3
2	(Bangladesh) (United Arab Emirates)	Shibu Lal; Othman Al-Ulama	6; 0	6; 1
3	(Bangladesh) (United Arab Emirates)	Muammer-Hussain Khan / Moinuddin Walliullah; Mahmoud Nader Al-Blooshi / Mohammed Saeed Al-Merri	6; 3	6; 2

=== Bahrain vs. Oman ===
Bahrain
3
National Complex, Ramna Park, Dhaka, Bangladesh
10 February 1998

Oman
0

			1	2	3
1	(Bahrain) (Oman)	Esam Abdulaal; Mazin Al-Sheibani	6; 0	6; 0
2	(Bahrain) (Oman)	Abdul-Latif Ahmed; Mudrik Al-Rawahi	6; 1	3; 6	6; 4
3	(Bahrain) (Oman)	Esam Abdulaal / Mohammed Jasim Sanad Ahmed; Khalid Al-Nabhani / Barkat Salim Al-Sharji	6; 3	6; 2

=== Brunei vs. Jordan ===
Brunei
0
National Complex, Ramna Park, Dhaka, Bangladesh
10 February 1998

Jordan
3

			1	2	3
1	(Brunei) (Jordan)	Ismasufian Ibrahim; Fares Azzouni	2; 6	6; 3	9; 11
2	(Brunei) (Jordan)	Tony Shim; Ahmed Ibrahim Ahmad Alhadid	0; 6	0; 6
3	(Brunei) (Jordan)	Ismasufian Ibrahim / Bin-Latif Isa; Fares Azzouni / Laith Azzouni	4; 6	2; 6

=== Bangladesh vs. Jordan ===
Bangladesh
2
National Complex, Ramna Park, Dhaka, Bangladesh
11 February 1998

Jordan
1

			1	2	3
1	(Bangladesh) (Jordan)	Dilip Passia; Fares Azzouni	6; 0	6; 3
2	(Bangladesh) (Jordan)	Shibu Lal; Laith Azzouni	6; 3	3; 6	2; 6
3	(Bangladesh) (Jordan)	Shibu Lal / Moinuddin Walliullah; Fares Azzouni / Laith Azzouni	2; 6	6; 2	6; 3

=== Bahrain vs. Iraq ===
Bahrain
2
National Complex, Ramna Park, Dhaka, Bangladesh
11 February 1998

Iraq
1

			1	2	3
1	(Bahrain) (Iraq)	Esam Abdulaal; Haidar Kadhim	6; 1	6; 2
2	(Bahrain) (Iraq)	Abdul-Latif Ahmed; Saddam-Hussain Kadhim	6; 1	2; 6	6; 2
3	(Bahrain) (Iraq)	Esam Abdulaal / Mohammed Jasim Sanad Ahmed; Saddam-Hussain Kadhim / Hussain Rasheed	6^{2} 7^{7}	7^{7} 6^{3}	5; 7

=== Brunei vs. United Arab Emirates ===
Brunei
1
National Complex, Ramna Park, Dhaka, Bangladesh
11 February 1998

United Arab Emirates
2

			1	2	3
1	(Brunei) (United Arab Emirates)	Ismasufian Ibrahim; Mohammed-Jamal Buschager	6; 3	6; 2
2	(Brunei) (United Arab Emirates)	Penh-How Chua; Mahmoud Nader Al-Blooshi	0; 6	5; 7
3	(Brunei) (United Arab Emirates)	Ismasufian Ibrahim / Bin-Latif Isa; Mahmoud Nader Al-Blooshi / Mohammed Saeed Al-Merri	5; 7	6^{6} 7^{8}

=== Bahrain vs. Brunei ===
Bahrain
3
National Complex, Ramna Park, Dhaka, Bangladesh
12 February 1998

Brunei
0

			1	2	3
1	(Bahrain) (Brunei)	Esam Abdulaal; Penh-How Chua	6; 0	6; 0
2	(Bahrain) (Brunei)	Abdul-Latif Ahmed; Tony Shim	6; 0	6; 0
3	(Bahrain) (Brunei)	Nader Abdul-Aal / Mohammed Jasim Sanad Ahmed; Ismasufian Ibrahim / Bin-Latif Isa	7^{7} 6^{4}	7; 5

=== Iraq vs. United Arab Emirates ===
Iraq
3
National Complex, Ramna Park, Dhaka, Bangladesh
12 February 1998

United Arab Emirates
0

			1	2	3
1	(Iraq) (United Arab Emirates)	Mohammed-Ahmed Ibrahim; Mahmoud Nader Al-Blooshi	6; 1	6; 1
2	(Iraq) (United Arab Emirates)	Saddam-Hussain Kadhim; Othman Al-Ulama	6; 0	6; 2
3	(Iraq) (United Arab Emirates)	Saddam-Hussain Kadhim / Hussain Rasheed; Othman Al-Ulama / Mohammed-Jamal Buschager	6; 1	6; 0

=== Jordan vs. Oman ===
Jordan
2
National Complex, Ramna Park, Dhaka, Bangladesh
12 February 1998

Oman
1

			1	2	3
1	(Jordan) (Oman)	Ahmed Ibrahim Ahmad Alhadid; Mudrik Al-Rawahi	1; 6	2; 6
2	(Jordan) (Oman)	Laith Azzouni; Khalid Al-Nabhani	6; 1	6; 4
3	(Jordan) (Oman)	Fares Azzouni / Laith Azzouni; Khalid Al-Nabhani / Mudrik Al-Rawahi	6; 4	6; 0

=== Bangladesh vs. Brunei ===
Bangladesh
3
National Complex, Ramna Park, Dhaka, Bangladesh
13 February 1998

Brunei
0

			1	2	3
1	(Bangladesh) (Brunei)	Dilip Passia; Ismasufian Ibrahim	6; 4	6; 4
2	(Bangladesh) (Brunei)	Shibu Lal; Penh-How Chua	6; 0	6; 0
3	(Bangladesh) (Brunei)	Shibu Lal / Moinuddin Walliullah; Penh-How Chua / Bin-Latif Isa	6; 4	6; 0

=== Iraq vs. Oman ===
Iraq
2
National Complex, Ramna Park, Dhaka, Bangladesh
13 February 1998

Oman
1

			1	2	3
1	(Iraq) (Oman)	Hussain Rasheed; Barkat Salim Al-Sharji	6; 0	6; 0
2	(Iraq) (Oman)	Mohammed-Ahmed Ibrahim; Mudrik Al-Rawahi	4; 6	4; 6
3	(Iraq) (Oman)	Saddam-Hussain Kadhim / Hussain Rasheed; Khalid Al-Nabhani / Mudrik Al-Rawahi	7; 5	7; 5

=== Jordan vs. United Arab Emirates ===
Jordan
3
National Complex, Ramna Park, Dhaka, Bangladesh
13 February 1998

United Arab Emirates
0

			1	2	3
1	(Jordan) (United Arab Emirates)	Ahmed Ibrahim Ahmad Alhadid; Mahmoud Nader Al-Blooshi	6^{2} 7^{7}	6; 2	6; 1
2	(Jordan) (United Arab Emirates)	Laith Azzouni; Othman Al-Ulama	6; 0	6; 1
3	(Jordan) (United Arab Emirates)	Fares Azzouni / Laith Azzouni; Mahmoud Nader Al-Blooshi / Mohammed Saeed Al-Merri	6; 4	6; 3

=== Bangladesh vs. Iraq ===
Bangladesh
3
National Complex, Ramna Park, Dhaka, Bangladesh
14 February 1998

Iraq
0

			1	2	3
1	(Bangladesh) (Iraq)	Dilip Passia; Mohammed-Ahmed Ibrahim	1; 6	6; 3	6; 2
2	(Bangladesh) (Iraq)	Shibu Lal; Saddam-Hussain Kadhim	6; 3	1; 6	6; 4
3	(Bangladesh) (Iraq)	Muammer-Hussain Khan / Moinuddin Walliullah; Haidar Kadhim / Hussain Rasheed	6; 2	2; 6	6; 2

=== Bahrain vs. Jordan ===
Bahrain
2
National Complex, Ramna Park, Dhaka, Bangladesh
14 February 1998

Jordan
1

			1	2	3
1	(Bahrain) (Jordan)	Esam Abdulaal; Ahmed Ibrahim Ahmad Alhadid	6; 1	6; 1
2	(Bahrain) (Jordan)	Abdul-Latif Ahmed; Laith Azzouni	4; 6	4; 6
3	(Bahrain) (Jordan)	Esam Abdulaal / Mohammed Jasim Sanad Ahmed; Fares Azzouni / Laith Azzouni	6; 2	6; 3

=== Brunei vs. Oman ===
Brunei
1
National Complex, Ramna Park, Dhaka, Bangladesh
14 February 1998

Oman
2

			1	2	3
1	(Brunei) (Oman)	Bin-Latif Isa; Mudrik Al-Rawahi	1; 6	0; 6
2	(Brunei) (Oman)	Ismasufian Ibrahim; Khalid Al-Nabhani	2; 6	2; 6
3	(Brunei) (Oman)	Ismasufian Ibrahim / Bin-Latif Isa; Khalid Al-Nabhani / Mudrik Al-Rawahi	7^{7} 6^{3}	7; 5

=== Bangladesh vs. Bahrain ===
Bangladesh
1
National Complex, Ramna Park, Dhaka, Bangladesh
15 February 1998

Bahrain
2

			1	2	3
1	(Bangladesh) (Bahrain)	Muammer-Hussain Khan; Esam Abdulaal	3; 6	2; 6
2	(Bangladesh) (Bahrain)	Dilip Passia; Abdul-Latif Ahmed	1; 6	6; 3	6; 4
3	(Bangladesh) (Bahrain)	Muammer-Hussain Khan / Moinuddin Walliullah; Esam Abdulaal / Mohammed Jasim Sanad Ahmed	6; 3	3; 6	3; 6

=== Iraq vs. Jordan ===
Iraq
3
National Complex, Ramna Park, Dhaka, Bangladesh
15 February 1998

Jordan
0

			1	2	3
1	(Iraq) (Jordan)	Hussain Rasheed; Fares Azzouni	2; 6	6; 3	7; 5
2	(Iraq) (Jordan)	Saddam-Hussain Kadhim; Ahmed Ibrahim Ahmad Alhadid	6; 2	7; 5
3	(Iraq) (Jordan)	Haidar Kadhim / Hussain Rasheed; Laith Azzouni / Yazid Nsairat	1; 2			retired

=== Oman vs. United Arab Emirates ===
Oman
2
National Complex, Ramna Park, Dhaka, Bangladesh
15 February 1998

United Arab Emirates
1

			1	2	3
1	(Oman) (United Arab Emirates)	Mudrik Al-Rawahi; Mahmoud Nader Al-Blooshi	6; 3	6; 2
2	(Oman) (United Arab Emirates)	Khalid Al-Nabhani; Othman Al-Ulama	1; 6	3; 6
3	(Oman) (United Arab Emirates)	Khalid Al-Nabhani / Mudrik Al-Rawahi; Mahmoud Nader Al-Blooshi / Othman Al-Ulama	7; 5	6^{5} 7^{7}	3; 2	retired
