= 2008 Davis Cup Asia/Oceania Zone Group IV =

International tennis competition

The Asian and Oceanian Zone is one of the three zones of regional Davis Cup competition in 2008.

In the Asian and Oceanian Zone there are four different groups in which teams compete against each other to advance to the next group.

The Group IV tournament was held April 9–13, in National Tennis Centre, Hassanal Bolkiah National Sports Complex, Bandar Seri Begawan, Brunei, on outdoor hard courts.

Mongolia made their Davis Cup debuts. They had a win-loss record of 1–4.

== Format ==
There will be a Round Robin where the eleven teams will compete in two pools. The winner of each pool will be promoted to the Asia and Oceania Group III in 2009.

== Pool A ==
	Pool A	SIN	MYA	BHR	IRQ	BRU
1	Singapore (4–0)		2–1	2–1	3–0	3–0
2	Myanmar (3–1)	1–2		2–1	2–1	3–0
3	Bahrain (2–2)	1–2	1–2		3–0	3–0
4	Iraq (1–3)	0–3	1–2	0–3		3–0
5	Brunei (0–4)	0–3	0–3	0–3	0–3	

- Singapore advances to Asia/Oceania Group III in 2009.

=== Singapore vs. Myanmar ===
Singapore
2
Hassanal Bolkiah National Stadium, Bandar Seri Begawan, Brunei
9 April 2008
Hard

Myanmar
1

			1	2	3
1	(Singapore) (Myanmar)	Stanley Armando; Zaw-Zaw Latt	4; 6	6^{3} 7^{7}
2	(Singapore) (Myanmar)	Min-Sylvester Wee; Min Min	6; 4	6; 4
3	(Singapore) (Myanmar)	Daniel Heryanta Dewandaka / Min-Sylvester Wee; Zaw-Zaw Latt / Khin-Maung Win	6; 3	6; 2

=== Bahrain vs. Brunei ===
Bahrain
3
Hassanal Bolkiah National Stadium, Bandar Seri Begawan, Brunei
9 April 2008
Hard

Brunei
0

			1	2	3
1	(Bahrain) (Brunei)	Hasan Abdulnabi; Asher Khan	6; 0	6; 2
2	(Bahrain) (Brunei)	Khaled Al Thawadi; Muhaimin Haji Awang	6; 2	6; 0
3	(Bahrain) (Brunei)	Khaled Al Thawadi / Abdulla Mohamed Ahmed Mohamed; Abdul Hamizan Abdul Hamid / Muhaimin Haji Awang	6; 0	6; 1

=== Singapore vs. Iraq ===
Singapore
3
Hassanal Bolkiah National Stadium, Bandar Seri Begawan, Brunei
10 April 2008
Hard

Iraq
0

			1	2	3
1	(Singapore) (Iraq)	Stanley Armando; Ali Khairi Hashim Al Mayahi	6; 3	6; 1
2	(Singapore) (Iraq)	Min-Sylvester Wee; Akram M Abdalkarem Al-Saadi	7; 5	6; 2
3	(Singapore) (Iraq)	Daniel Heryanta Dewandaka / Min-Sylvester Wee; Akram M Abdalkarem Al-Saadi / Ali Khairi Hashim Al Mayahi	6; 0	6; 2

=== Myanmar vs. Brunei ===
Myanmar
3
Hassanal Bolkiah National Stadium, Bandar Seri Begawan, Brunei
10 April 2008
Hard

Brunei
0

			1	2	3
1	(Myanmar) (Brunei)	Zaw-Zaw Latt; Nurul Mohammed Hanadi Bin Hambali	6; 0	6; 0
2	(Myanmar) (Brunei)	Phyo Min Thar; Asher Khan	6; 0	6; 0
3	(Myanmar) (Brunei)	Min Min / Khin-Maung Win; Abdul Hamizan Abdul Hamid / Muhaimin Haji Awang	6; 2	6; 0

=== Bahrain vs. Myanmar ===
Bahrain
1
Hassanal Bolkiah National Stadium, Bandar Seri Begawan, Brunei
11 April 2008
Hard

Myanmar
2

			1	2	3
1	(Bahrain) (Myanmar)	Hasan Abdulnabi; Zaw-Zaw Latt	2; 6	1; 6
2	(Bahrain) (Myanmar)	Khaled Al Thawadi; Min Min	6; 2	6; 2
3	(Bahrain) (Myanmar)	Khaled Al Thawadi / Abdulla Mohamed Ahmed Mohamed; Zaw-Zaw Latt / Khin-Maung Win	2; 6	4; 6

=== Iraq vs. Brunei ===
Iraq
3
Hassanal Bolkiah National Stadium, Bandar Seri Begawan, Brunei
11 April 2008
Hard

Brunei
0

			1	2	3
1	(Iraq) (Brunei)	Ali Khairi Hashim Al Mayahi; Asher Khan	6; 3	6; 1
2	(Iraq) (Brunei)	Akram M Abdalkarem Al-Saadi; Muhaimin Haji Awang	6; 0	6; 0
3	(Iraq) (Brunei)	Akram M Abdalkarem Al-Saadi / Ali Khairi Hashim Al Mayahi; Abdul Hamizan Abdul Hamid / Muhaimin Haji Awang	6; 1	6; 0

=== Singapore vs. Bahrain ===
Singapore
2
Hassanal Bolkiah National Stadium, Bandar Seri Begawan, Brunei
12 April 2008
Hard

Bahrain
1

			1	2	3
1	(Singapore) (Bahrain)	Stanley Armando; Hasan Abdulnabi	6; 3	5; 7	4; 6
2	(Singapore) (Bahrain)	Min-Sylvester Wee; Khaled Al Thawadi	6; 3	7^{7} 6^{5}
3	(Singapore) (Bahrain)	Daniel Heryanta Dewandaka / Min-Sylvester Wee; Hasan Abdulnabi / Khaled Al Thawadi	5; 7	6; 1	6; 3

=== Myanmar vs. Iraq ===
Myanmar
2
Hassanal Bolkiah National Stadium, Bandar Seri Begawan, Brunei
12 April 2008
Hard

Iraq
1

			1	2	3
1	(Myanmar) (Iraq)	Zaw-Zaw Latt; Ali Khairi Hashim Al Mayahi	6; 0	6; 2
2	(Myanmar) (Iraq)	Phyo Min Thar; Akram M Abdalkarem Al-Saadi	6^{4} 7^{7}	3; 6
3	(Myanmar) (Iraq)	Zaw-Zaw Latt / Khin-Maung Win; Akram M Abdalkarem Al-Saadi / Ali Khairi Hashim Al Mayahi	6; 1	6; 2

=== Singapore vs. Brunei ===
Singapore
3
Hassanal Bolkiah National Stadium, Bandar Seri Begawan, Brunei
13 April 2008
Hard

Brunei
0

			1	2	3
1	(Singapore) (Brunei)	Jun-Yang Tan; Abdul Hamizan Abdul Hamid	6; 2	6; 2
2	(Singapore) (Brunei)	Min-Sylvester Wee; Asher Khan	6; 1	6; 1
3	(Singapore) (Brunei)	Jun-Yang Tan / Min-Sylvester Wee; Abdul Hamizan Abdul Hamid / Muhaimin Haji Awang	6; 1	6; 1

=== Bahrain vs. Iraq ===
Bahrain
3
Hassanal Bolkiah National Stadium, Bandar Seri Begawan, Brunei
13 April 2008
Hard

Iraq
0

			1	2	3
1	(Bahrain) (Iraq)	Hasan Abdulnabi; Ali Khairi Hashim Al Mayahi	3; 6	6; 3	7^{7} 6^{4}
2	(Bahrain) (Iraq)	Khaled Al Thawadi; Akram M Abdalkarem Al-Saadi	6; 2	6; 1
3	(Bahrain) (Iraq)	Abdulla Mohamed Ahmed Mohamed / Ahmed Yousif; Ali Khairi Hashim Al Mayahi / Bilal Mahdi	6; 3	6; 4

== Pool B ==
	Pool B	KSA	BAN	JOR	TKM	MGL	QAT
1	Saudi Arabia (5–0)		2–1	3–0	3–0	3–0	3–0
2	Bangladesh (4–1)	1–2		2–1	2–1	3–0	3–0
3	Jordan (3–2)	0–3	1–2		2–1	2–1	3–0
4	Turkmenistan (2–3)	0–3	1–2	1–2		2–1	2–1
5	Mongolia (1–4)	0–3	0–3	1–2	1–2		2–1
6	Qatar (0–5)	0–3	0–3	0–3	1–2	1–2	

- Saudi Arabia advances to Asia/Oceania Group III in 2009.

=== Saudi Arabia vs. Mongolia ===
Saudi Arabia
3
Hassanal Bolkiah National Stadium, Bandar Seri Begawan, Brunei
9 April 2008
Hard

Mongolia
0

			1	2	3
1	(Saudi Arabia) (Mongolia)	Fahad Al Saad; Duurenbayar Erdenebayar	6; 0	6; 0
2	(Saudi Arabia) (Mongolia)	Saleh Alrajeh; Urnukh Baasanjav	6; 0	6; 1
3	(Saudi Arabia) (Mongolia)	Bader Mohammed Almuqail / Omar Althagib; Margadmun Munkhbayar / Orgil Tsogt	6; 0	6; 0

=== Bangladesh vs. Turkmenistan ===
Bangladesh
2
Hassanal Bolkiah National Stadium, Bandar Seri Begawan, Brunei
9 April 2008
Hard

Turkmenistan
1

			1	2	3
1	(Bangladesh) (Turkmenistan)	Shibu Lal; Myalikkuli Mamedkuliyev	7^{7} 6^{4}	6; 0
2	(Bangladesh) (Turkmenistan)	Sree-Amol Roy; Amankuli Begenjov	6; 4	6; 3
3	(Bangladesh) (Turkmenistan)	Shibu Lal / Ranjan Ram; Dovran Chagylov / Myalikkuli Mamedkuliyev	7; 5	5; 7	5; 7

=== Qatar vs. Jordan ===
Qatar
0
Hassanal Bolkiah National Stadium, Bandar Seri Begawan, Brunei
9 April 2008
Hard

Jordan
3

			1	2	3
1	(Qatar) (Jordan)	Mousa Shanan Zayed; Khaled Naffa	1; 6	2; 6
2	(Qatar) (Jordan)	Abdulla Al-Haji; Fabio Badra	4; 6	4; 6
3	(Qatar) (Jordan)	Hamad Al Mulla / Mousa Shanan Zayed; Khaled Naffa / Tareq Talal Shkakwa	0; 6	1; 6

=== Saudi Arabia vs. Turkmenistan ===
Saudi Arabia
3
Hassanal Bolkiah National Stadium, Bandar Seri Begawan, Brunei
10 April 2008
Hard

Turkmenistan
0

			1	2	3
1	(Saudi Arabia) (Turkmenistan)	Fahad Al Saad; Myalikkuli Mamedkuliyev	6; 3	6; 3
2	(Saudi Arabia) (Turkmenistan)	Saleh Alrajeh; Amankuli Begenjov	6; 1	6; 4
3	(Saudi Arabia) (Turkmenistan)	Bader Mohammed Almuqail / Saleh Alrajeh; Dovran Chagylov / Myalikkuli Mamedkuliyev	6; 2	6; 2

=== Bangladesh vs. Jordan ===
Bangladesh
2
Hassanal Bolkiah National Stadium, Bandar Seri Begawan, Brunei
10 April 2008
Hard

Jordan
1

			1	2	3
1	(Bangladesh) (Jordan)	Shibu Lal; Khaled Naffa	4; 6	6; 4	2; 6
2	(Bangladesh) (Jordan)	Sree-Amol Roy; Fabio Badra	6; 2	6; 0
3	(Bangladesh) (Jordan)	Ranjan Ram / Sree-Amol Roy; Khaled Naffa / Tareq Talal Shkakwa	6; 4	6; 4

=== Qatar vs. Mongolia ===
Qatar
1
Hassanal Bolkiah National Stadium, Bandar Seri Begawan, Brunei
10 April 2008
Hard

Mongolia
2

			1	2	3
1	(Qatar) (Mongolia)	Mousa Shanan Zayed; Duurenbayar Erdenebayar	3; 6	3; 6
2	(Qatar) (Mongolia)	Abdulla Al-Haji; Urnukh Baasanjav	6; 4	6; 2
3	(Qatar) (Mongolia)	Abdulla Al-Haji / Mousa Shanan Zayed; Urnukh Baasanjav / Duurenbayar Erdenebayar	2; 6	4; 6

=== Saudi Arabia vs. Qatar ===
Saudi Arabia
3
Hassanal Bolkiah National Stadium, Bandar Seri Begawan, Brunei
11 April 2008
Hard

Qatar
0

			1	2	3
1	(Saudi Arabia) (Qatar)	Omar Althagib; Hamad Al Mulla	6; 0	6; 1
2	(Saudi Arabia) (Qatar)	Fahad Al Saad; Abdulla Al-Haji	6; 3	6; 1
3	(Saudi Arabia) (Qatar)	Bader Mohammed Almuqail / Saleh Alrajeh; Hamad Al Mulla / Mousa Shanan Zayed	6; 2	6; 4

=== Bangladesh vs. Mongolia ===
Bangladesh
3
Hassanal Bolkiah National Stadium, Bandar Seri Begawan, Brunei
11 April 2008
Hard

Mongolia
0

			1	2	3
1	(Bangladesh) (Mongolia)	Shibu Lal; Orgil Tsogt	6; 0	6; 2
2	(Bangladesh) (Mongolia)	Sree-Amol Roy; Duurenbayar Erdenebayar	6; 3	6; 0
3	(Bangladesh) (Mongolia)	Ranjan Ram / Sree-Amol Roy; Urnukh Baasanjav / Margadmun Munkhbayar	6; 0	6; 0

=== Jordan vs. Turkmenistan ===
Jordan
2
Hassanal Bolkiah National Stadium, Bandar Seri Begawan, Brunei
11 April 2008
Hard

Turkmenistan
1

			1	2	3
1	(Jordan) (Turkmenistan)	Tareq Talal Shkakwa; Myalikkuli Mamedkuliyev	6; 3	3; 6	6^{5} 7^{7}
2	(Jordan) (Turkmenistan)	Fabio Badra; Amankuli Begenjov	7; 5	6; 4
3	(Jordan) (Turkmenistan)	Fabio Badra / Khaled Naffa; Dovran Chagylov / Myalikkuli Mamedkuliyev	4; 6	6; 1	7; 5

=== Saudi Arabia vs. Bangladesh ===
Saudi Arabia
2
Hassanal Bolkiah National Stadium, Bandar Seri Begawan, Brunei
12 April 2008
Hard

Bangladesh
1

			1	2	3
1	(Saudi Arabia) (Bangladesh)	Fahad Al Saad; Shibu Lal	6; 4	6; 1
2	(Saudi Arabia) (Bangladesh)	Saleh Alrajeh; Sree-Amol Roy	6; 4	3; 6	1; 6
3	(Saudi Arabia) (Bangladesh)	Bader Mohammed Almuqail / Fahad Al Saad; Ranjan Ram / Sree-Amol Roy	6; 4	6; 4

=== Qatar vs. Turkmenistan ===
Qatar
1
Hassanal Bolkiah National Stadium, Bandar Seri Begawan, Brunei
12 April 2008
Hard

Turkmenistan
2

			1	2	3
1	(Qatar) (Turkmenistan)	Hamad Al Mulla; Myalikkuli Mamedkuliyev	2; 6	3; 6
2	(Qatar) (Turkmenistan)	Mousa Shanan Zayed; Amankuli Begenjov	2; 6	4; 6
3	(Qatar) (Turkmenistan)	Hamad Al Mulla / Mousa Shanan Zayed; Amankuli Begenjov / Evgeniy Jirnov	7^{7} 6^{4}	6; 3

=== Jordan vs. Mongolia ===
Jordan
2
Hassanal Bolkiah National Stadium, Bandar Seri Begawan, Brunei
12 April 2008
Hard

Mongolia
1

			1	2	3
1	(Jordan) (Mongolia)	Khaled Naffa; Duurenbayar Erdenebayar	6^{5} 7^{7}	7; 5	1; 6
2	(Jordan) (Mongolia)	Fabio Badra; Urnukh Baasanjav	6; 2	6; 2
3	(Jordan) (Mongolia)	Fabio Badra / Khaled Naffa; Urnukh Baasanjav / Duurenbayar Erdenebayar	6; 4	6; 2

=== Saudi Arabia vs. Jordan ===
Saudi Arabia
3
Hassanal Bolkiah National Stadium, Bandar Seri Begawan, Brunei
13 April 2008
Hard

Jordan
0

			1	2	3
1	(Saudi Arabia) (Jordan)	Omar Althagib; Tareq Talal Shkakwa	6; 2	6; 1
2	(Saudi Arabia) (Jordan)	Fahad Al Saad; Fabio Badra	6; 2	7^{7} 6^{5}
3	(Saudi Arabia) (Jordan)	Bader Mohammed Almuqail / Saleh Alrajeh; Mohammed Adas / Tareq Talal Shkakwa	6; 0	6; 4

=== Bangladesh vs. Qatar ===
Bangladesh
3
Hassanal Bolkiah National Stadium, Bandar Seri Begawan, Brunei
13 April 2008
Hard

Qatar
0

			1	2	3
1	(Bangladesh) (Qatar)	Shibu Lal; Hamad Al Mulla	6; 1	6; 1
2	(Bangladesh) (Qatar)	Sree-Amol Roy; Mousa Shanan Zayed	6; 2	6; 0
3	(Bangladesh) (Qatar)	Shibu Lal / Ranjan Ram; Hamad Al Mulla / Mousa Shanan Zayed	6; 1	6; 4

=== Turkmenistan vs. Mongolia ===
Turkmenistan
2
Hassanal Bolkiah National Stadium, Bandar Seri Begawan, Brunei
13 April 2008
Hard

Mongolia
1

			1	2	3
1	(Turkmenistan) (Mongolia)	Myalikkuli Mamedkuliyev; Duurenbayar Erdenebayar	3; 6	7; 5	4; 6
2	(Turkmenistan) (Mongolia)	Amankuli Begenjov; Urnukh Baasanjav	6; 1	6; 1
3	(Turkmenistan) (Mongolia)	Dovran Chagylov / Myalikkuli Mamedkuliyev; Urnukh Baasanjav / Duurenbayar Erdenebayar	6; 0	5; 6		retired
