= 1999 Davis Cup Asia/Oceania Zone Group IV =

International tennis competition

The Asia/Oceania Zone was one of the three zones of the regional Davis Cup competition in 1999.

In the Asia/Oceania Zone there were four different tiers, called groups, in which teams competed against each other to advance to the upper tier. The top two teams in Group IV advanced to the Asia/Oceania Zone Group III in 2000. All other teams remained in Group IV.

== Participating nations ==
- Brunei
- Fiji
- Iraq
- Jordan
- Kuwait
- Oman
- Singapore
- United Arab Emirates

=== Draw ===
- Venue: National Centre, Bandar Seri Begawan, Brunei
- Date: 3–7 February

Group A

	SIN	UAE	IRQ	BRU	RR; W–L	Match; W–L	Game; W–L	Standings
Singapore		2–1	2–1	3–0	3–0	7–2 (78%)	14–6 (70%)	1
United Arab Emirates	1–2		2–1	3–0	2–1	6–3 (67%)	13–8 (62%)	2
Iraq	1–2	1–2		3–0	1–2	5–4 (56%)	12–8 (60%)	3
Brunei	0–3	0–3	0–3		0–3	0–9 (0%)	1–18 (5%)	4

Group B

	KUW	OMA	JOR	FIJ	RR; W–L	Match; W–L	Set; W–L	Standings
Kuwait		2–1	2–1	3–0	3–0	7–2 (78%)	15–6 (71%)	1
Oman	1–2		3–0	3–0	2–1	7–2 (78%)	14–5 (74%)	2
Jordan	1–2	0–3		2–0	1–2	3–5 (38%)	7–12 (37%)	3
Fiji	0–3	0–3	0–2		0–3	0–8 (0%)	3–16 (16%)	4

1st to 4th place play-offs

3rd-4th Play-off
B2	Oman	2
A2	United Arab Emirates	1

Semifinals
A1	Singapore	2
B2	Oman	0
A2	United Arab Emirates	0
B1	Kuwait	2

Final
A1	Singapore	0
B1	Kuwait	3

5th to 8th place play-offs

7th-8th Play-off
A3	Iraq	3
A4	Brunei	0

5th-8th Play-offs
A3	Iraq	1
B4	Fiji	2
A4	Brunei	0
B3	Jordan	3

5th-6th Play-off
B4	Fiji	2
B3	Jordan	1

=== Final standings ===
Rank	Team
1	Kuwait
2	Singapore
3	Oman
4	United Arab Emirates
5	Fiji
6	Jordan
7	Iraq
8	Brunei

- Kuwait and Singapore promoted to Group III in 2000.

== Round robin ==
=== Group A ===
==== Brunei vs. United Arab Emirates ====
Brunei
0
National Centre, Bandar Seri Begawan, Brunei
3 February 1999

United Arab Emirates
3

			1	2	3
1	(Brunei) (United Arab Emirates)	Hardiyamin Baharuddin; Othman Al-Ulama	2; 6	6; 4	2; 6
2	(Brunei) (United Arab Emirates)	Sharill Teo; Omar Alawadhi	2; 6	0; 6
3	(Brunei) (United Arab Emirates)	Hardiyamin Baharuddin / Bin-Latif Isa; Omar Alawadhi / Hadi Badri	2; 6	4; 6

==== Iraq vs. Singapore ====
Iraq
1
National Centre, Bandar Seri Begawan, Brunei
3 February 1999

Singapore
2

			1	2	3
1	(Iraq) (Singapore)	Mohammed-Ahmed Ibrahim; Kho Tung-yi	3; 6	5; 7
2	(Iraq) (Singapore)	Saddam-Hussain Kadhim; Yang Sian	6; 3	6; 2
3	(Iraq) (Singapore)	Haidar Kadhim / Saddam-Hussain Kadhim; Kho Tung-yi / Liu Wai-yaw	6; 3	3; 6	3; 6

==== Brunei vs. Singapore ====
Brunei
0
National Centre, Bandar Seri Begawan, Brunei
4 February 1999

Singapore
3

			1	2	3
1	(Brunei) (Singapore)	Hardiyamin Baharuddin; Kho Tung-yi	1; 6	0; 6
2	(Brunei) (Singapore)	Sharill Teo; Ong Jun	1; 6	2; 6
3	(Brunei) (Singapore)	Hardiyamin Baharuddin / Bin-Latif Isa; Kho Tung-yi / Liu Wai-yaw	1; 6	1; 6

==== Iraq vs. United Arab Emirates ====
Iraq
1
National Centre, Bandar Seri Begawan, Brunei
4 February 1999

United Arab Emirates
2

			1	2	3
1	(Iraq) (United Arab Emirates)	Auday Jihad; Hadi Badri	6; 1	6; 4
2	(Iraq) (United Arab Emirates)	Saddam-Hussain Kadhim; Omar Alawadhi	0; 6	4; 6
3	(Iraq) (United Arab Emirates)	Auday Jihad / Haidar Kadhim; Omar Alawadhi / Hadi Badri	4; 6	6; 2	6; 8

==== Brunei vs. Iraq ====
Brunei
0
National Centre, Bandar Seri Begawan, Brunei
5 February 1999

Iraq
3

			1	2	3
1	(Brunei) (Iraq)	Hardiyamin Baharuddin; Auday Jihad	3; 6	1; 6
2	(Brunei) (Iraq)	Sharill Teo; Mohammed-Ahmed Ibrahim	2; 6	0; 6
3	(Brunei) (Iraq)	Hardiyamin Baharuddin / Bin-Latif Isa; Haidar Kadhim / Saddam-Hussain Kadhim	0; 6	0; 6

==== Singapore vs. United Arab Emirates ====
Singapore
2
National Centre, Bandar Seri Begawan, Brunei
5 February 1999

United Arab Emirates
1

			1	2	3
1	(Singapore) (United Arab Emirates)	Kho Tung-yi; Omar Alawadhi	3; 6	5; 7
2	(Singapore) (United Arab Emirates)	Yang Sian; Mahmoud Nader Al-Blooshi	6; 2	5; 7	6; 0
3	(Singapore) (United Arab Emirates)	Kho Tung-yi / Liu Wai-yaw; Omar Alawadhi / Hadi Badri	7; 5	6; 0

=== Group B ===
==== Fiji vs. Oman ====
Fiji
0
National Centre, Bandar Seri Begawan, Brunei
3 February 1999

Oman
3

			1	2	3
1	(Fiji) (Oman)	Hitesh Morriswala; Mudrik Al-Rawahi	2; 6	1; 6
2	(Fiji) (Oman)	Sanjeev Tikaram; Khalid Al-Nabhani	3; 6	4; 6
3	(Fiji) (Oman)	Mohammed Jannif / Sanjeev Tikaram; Khalid Al-Nabhani / Mudrik Al-Rawahi	6; 3	4; 6	4; 6

==== Jordan vs. Kuwait ====
Jordan
1
National Centre, Bandar Seri Begawan, Brunei
3 February 1999

Kuwait
2

			1	2	3
1	(Jordan) (Kuwait)	Ahmed Ibrahim Ahmad Alhadid; Hussain Al-Ashwak	3; 6	6; 3	4; 6
2	(Jordan) (Kuwait)	Laith Azzouni; Mohammad Ghareeb	1; 6	0; 6
3	(Jordan) (Kuwait)	Laith Azzouni / Khaled Naffa; Hussain Al-Ghareeb / Adel Al-Shatti	6; 3	4; 6	6; 3

==== Fiji vs. Kuwait ====
Fiji
0
National Centre, Bandar Seri Begawan, Brunei
4 February 1999

Kuwait
3

			1	2	3
1	(Fiji) (Kuwait)	Mohammed Jannif; Hussain Al-Ashwak	7; 5	4; 6	3; 6
2	(Fiji) (Kuwait)	Sanjeev Tikaram; Mohammad Ghareeb	0; 6	5; 7
3	(Fiji) (Kuwait)	Mohammed Jannif / Sanjeev Tikaram; Mohammad Ghareeb / Adel Al-Shatti	2; 6	6^{5} 7^{7}

==== Jordan vs. Oman ====
Jordan
0
National Centre, Bandar Seri Begawan, Brunei
4 February 1999

Oman
3

			1	2	3
1	(Jordan) (Oman)	Ahmed Ibrahim Ahmad Alhadid; Mudrik Al-Rawahi	4; 6	1; 6
2	(Jordan) (Oman)	Khaled Naffa; Khalid Al-Nabhani	3; 6	2; 6
3	(Jordan) (Oman)	Fares Azzouni / Laith Azzouni; Khalid Al-Nabhani / Mudrik Al-Rawahi	6^{4} 7^{7}	4; 6

==== Fiji vs. Jordan ====
Fiji
0
National Centre, Bandar Seri Begawan, Brunei
5 February 1999

Jordan
2

			1	2	3
1	(Fiji) (Jordan)	Mohammed Jannif; Laith Azzouni	4; 6	1; 6
2	(Fiji) (Jordan)	Sanjeev Tikaram; Khaled Naffa	4; 6	6; 3	5; 7
3	(Fiji) (Jordan)	Mohammed Jannif / Hitesh Morriswala; Laith Azzouni / Khaled Naffa				not played

==== Kuwait vs. Oman ====
Kuwait
2
National Centre, Bandar Seri Begawan, Brunei
5 February 1999

Oman
1

			1	2	3
1	(Kuwait) (Oman)	Adel Al-Shatti; Mudrik Al-Rawahi	2; 6	3; 6
2	(Kuwait) (Oman)	Mohammad Ghareeb; Khalid Al-Nabhani	6; 4	6; 0
3	(Kuwait) (Oman)	Mohammad Ghareeb / Adel Al-Shatti; Khalid Al-Nabhani / Mudrik Al-Rawahi	6; 2	6; 3

== 1st to 4th place play-offs ==
=== Semifinals ===
==== Singapore vs. Oman ====
Singapore
2
National Centre, Bandar Seri Begawan, Brunei
6 February 1999

Oman
0

			1	2	3
1	(Singapore) (Oman)	Kho Tung-yi; Mudrik Al-Rawahi	6; 4	6; 2
2	(Singapore) (Oman)	Yang Sian; Khalid Al-Nabhani	1; 6	7; 5	6; 1
3	(Singapore) (Oman)	Kho Tung-yi / Liu Wai-yaw; Khalid Al-Nabhani / Barkat Salim Al-Sharji				not played

==== Kuwait vs. United Arab Emirates ====
Kuwait
2
National Centre, Bandar Seri Begawan, Brunei
6 February 1999

United Arab Emirates
0

			1	2	3
1	(Kuwait) (United Arab Emirates)	Hussain Al-Ashwak; Othman Al-Ulama	4; 6	6; 4	10; 8
2	(Kuwait) (United Arab Emirates)	Mohammad Ghareeb; Omar Alawadhi	6; 1	6; 2
3	(Kuwait) (United Arab Emirates)	Mohammad Ghareeb / Adel Al-Shatti; Othman Al-Ulama / Omar Alawadhi				not played

=== Final ===
==== Singapore vs. Kuwait ====
Singapore
0
National Centre, Bandar Seri Begawan, Brunei
7 February 1999

Kuwait
3

			1	2	3
1	(Singapore) (Kuwait)	Ong Jun; Hussain Al-Ghareeb	3; 6	6; 3	4; 6
2	(Singapore) (Kuwait)	Yang Sian; Mohammad Ghareeb	4; 6	0; 6
3	(Singapore) (Kuwait)	Ong Jun / Yang Sian; Hussain Al-Ashwak / Adel Al-Shatti	3; 6	6; 2	4; 6

=== 3rd to 4th play-off ===
==== Oman vs. United Arab Emirates ====
Oman
2
National Centre, Bandar Seri Begawan, Brunei
7 February 1999

United Arab Emirates
1

			1	2	3
1	(Oman) (United Arab Emirates)	Mudrik Al-Rawahi; Omar Alawadhi	6; 4	6; 2
2	(Oman) (United Arab Emirates)	Khalid Al-Nabhani; Mahmoud Nader Al-Blooshi	6; 2	6; 3
3	(Oman) (United Arab Emirates)	Khalid Al-Nabhani / Barkat Salim Al-Sharji; Mahmoud Nader Al-Blooshi / Othman Al-Ulama	6; 2	3; 6	4; 6

== 5th to 8th place play-offs ==
=== 5th to 8th play-offs ===
==== Iraq vs. Fiji ====
Iraq
1
National Centre, Bandar Seri Begawan, Brunei
6 February 1999

Fiji
2

			1	2	3
1	(Iraq) (Fiji)	Mohammed-Ahmed Ibrahim; Hitesh Morriswala	2; 6	3; 6
2	(Iraq) (Fiji)	Saddam-Hussain Kadhim; Sanjeev Tikaram	3; 6	6; 4	4; 6
3	(Iraq) (Fiji)	Auday Jihad / Haidar Kadhim; Mohammed Jannif / Ajay Raniga	6; 0	6; 4

==== Brunei vs. Jordan ====
Brunei
0
National Centre, Bandar Seri Begawan, Brunei
6 February 1999

Jordan
3

			1	2	3
1	(Brunei) (Jordan)	Abdullah Ali; Ahmed Ibrahim Ahmad Alhadid	1; 6	2; 6
2	(Brunei) (Jordan)	Hardiyamin Baharuddin; Khaled Naffa	2; 6	1; 6
3	(Brunei) (Jordan)	Abdullah Ali / Hardiyamin Baharuddin; Fares Azzouni / Laith Azzouni	1; 6	3; 6

=== 5th to 6th play-off ===
==== Fiji vs. Jordan ====
Fiji
2
National Centre, Bandar Seri Begawan, Brunei
7 February 1999

Jordan
1

			1	2	3
1	(Fiji) (Jordan)	Hitesh Morriswala; Ahmed Ibrahim Ahmad Alhadid	7; 5	2; 6	7; 5
2	(Fiji) (Jordan)	Sanjeev Tikaram; Khaled Naffa	1; 6	6; 2	6; 2
3	(Fiji) (Jordan)	Mohammed Jannif / Ajay Raniga; Fares Azzouni / Khaled Naffa	1; 6	7^{7} 6^{5}	3; 6

=== 7th to 8th play-off ===
==== Iraq vs. Brunei ====
Iraq
3
National Centre, Bandar Seri Begawan, Brunei
7 February 1999

Brunei
0

			1	2	3
1	(Iraq) (Brunei)	Auday Jihad; Abdullah Ali	6; 2	6; 1
2	(Iraq) (Brunei)	Mohammed-Ahmed Ibrahim; Sharill Teo	6; 2	6; 2
3	(Iraq) (Brunei)	Mohammed-Ahmed Ibrahim / Haidar Kadhim; Abdullah Ali / Sharill Teo	6; 1	6; 2
