= 2001 Davis Cup Asia/Oceania Zone Group IV =

International tennis competition

The Asia/Oceania Zone was one of the three zones of the regional Davis Cup competition in 2001.

In the Asia/Oceania Zone there were four different tiers, called groups, in which teams competed against each other to advance to the upper tier. The top two teams in Group IV advanced to the Asia/Oceania Zone Group III in 2002. All other teams remained in Group IV.

== Participating nations ==
- Bangladesh
- Brunei
- Fiji
- Iraq
- Jordan
- Oman
- Pacific Oceania
- United Arab Emirates

== Draw ==
- Venue: Abu Dhabi Airport Golf and Tennis Club, Abu Dhabi, United Arab Emirates
- Date: 25–29 April

Group A

	IRQ	OMA	BAN	FIJ	RR; W–L	Match; W–L	Set; W–L	Standings
Iraq		2–1	3–0	3–0	3–0	8–1 (89%)	17–4 (81%)	1
Oman	1–2		1–2	3–0	1–2	5–4 (56%)	12–12 (50%)	2
Bangladesh	0–3	2–1		1–2	1–2	3–6 (33%)	7–14 (33%)	3
Fiji	0–3	0–3	2–1		1–2	2–7 (22%)	9–15 (38%)	4

Group B

	UAE	POC	JOR	BRU	RR; W–L	Match; W–L	Set; W–L	Standings
United Arab Emirates		2–1	2–1	3–0	3–0	7–2 (78%)	14–6 (70%)	1
Pacific Oceania	1–2		2–1	3–0	2–1	6–3 (67%)	14–7 (67%)	2
Jordan	1–2	1–2		3–0	1–2	5–4 (56%)	12–9 (57%)	3
Brunei	0–3	0–3	0–3		0–3	0–9 (0%)	0–18 (0%)	4

1st to 4th place play-offs

3rd-4th Play-off
A1	Iraq	3
A2	Oman	0

Semifinals
A1	Iraq	1
B2	Pacific Oceania	2
A2	Oman	1
B1	United Arab Emirates	2

Final
B2	Pacific Oceania	1
B1	United Arab Emirates	2

5th to 8th place play-offs

7th-8th Play-off
A3	Bangladesh	1
A4	Fiji	2

5th-8th Play-offs
A3	Bangladesh	1
B4	Brunei	2
A4	Fiji	1
B3	Jordan	2

5th-6th Play-off
B4	Brunei	0
B3	Jordan	3

=== Final standings ===
Rank	Team
1	United Arab Emirates
2	Pacific Oceania
3	Iraq
4	Oman
5	Jordan
6	Brunei
7	Fiji
8	Bangladesh

- United Arab Emirates and Pacific Oceania promoted to Group III in 2002.

== Round robin ==
=== Group A ===
==== Bangladesh vs. Oman ====
Bangladesh
2
Abu Dhabi Airport Golf and Tennis Club, Abu Dhabi, United Arab Emirates
25 April 2001

Oman
1

			1	2	3
1	(Bangladesh) (Oman)	Moinuddin Walliullah; Saleh Al-Zadjali	6; 2	3; 6	6; 4
2	(Bangladesh) (Oman)	Dilip Passia; Mohammed Al-Nabhani	1; 6	1; 6
3	(Bangladesh) (Oman)	Dilip Passia / Moinuddin Walliullah; Haithem Al-Jabri / Mohammed Al-Nabhani	2; 6	6; 4	6; 2

==== Fiji vs. Iraq ====
Fiji
0
Abu Dhabi Airport Golf and Tennis Club, Abu Dhabi, United Arab Emirates
25 April 2001

Iraq
3

			1	2	3
1	(Fiji) (Iraq)	David O'Connor; Haidar Kadhim	1; 6	7^{7} 6^{2}	0; 6
2	(Fiji) (Iraq)	Sanjeev Tikaram; Saddam-Hussain Kadhim	0; 6	6; 3	4; 6
3	(Fiji) (Iraq)	David O'Connor / Ajay Raniga; Haidar Kadhim / Hussain Rasheed	2; 6	0; 6

==== Bangladesh vs. Fiji ====
Bangladesh
1
Abu Dhabi Airport Golf and Tennis Club, Abu Dhabi, United Arab Emirates
26 April 2001

Fiji
2

			1	2	3
1	(Bangladesh) (Fiji)	Moinuddin Walliullah; David O'Connor	6; 2	6; 0
2	(Bangladesh) (Fiji)	Dilip Passia; Sanjeev Tikaram	1; 6	3; 6
3	(Bangladesh) (Fiji)	Dilip Passia / Moinuddin Walliullah; David O'Connor / Sanjeev Tikaram	7^{7} 6^{1}	3; 6	1; 6

==== Oman vs. Iraq ====
Oman
1
Abu Dhabi Airport Golf and Tennis Club, Abu Dhabi, United Arab Emirates
26 April 2001

Iraq
2

			1	2	3
1	(Oman) (Iraq)	Saleh Al-Zadjali; Saddam-Hussain Kadhim	0; 6	2; 6
2	(Oman) (Iraq)	Mohammed Al-Nabhani; Hussain Rasheed	6^{2} 7^{7}	7; 5	6; 3
3	(Oman) (Iraq)	Haithem Al-Jabri / Mohammed Al-Nabhani; Nasir Al-Hatam / Haidar Kadhim	2; 6	3; 6

==== Bangladesh vs. Iraq ====
Bangladesh
0
Abu Dhabi Airport Golf and Tennis Club, Abu Dhabi, United Arab Emirates
27 April 2001

Iraq
3

			1	2	3
1	(Bangladesh) (Iraq)	Moinuddin Walliullah; Haidar Kadhim	5; 7	0; 6
2	(Bangladesh) (Iraq)	Dilip Passia; Saddam-Hussain Kadhim	3; 6	3; 6
3	(Bangladesh) (Iraq)	Lakhan Lal / Dilip Passia; Hussain Rasheed / Nasir Al-Hatam	3; 6	3; 6

==== Oman vs. Fiji ====
Oman
3
Abu Dhabi Airport Golf and Tennis Club, Abu Dhabi, United Arab Emirates
27 April 2001

Fiji
0

			1	2	3
1	(Oman) (Fiji)	Saleh Al-Zadjali; David O'Connor	4; 6	6; 1	6; 0
2	(Oman) (Fiji)	Mohammed Al-Nabhani; Sanjeev Tikaram	6; 4	5; 7	6; 2
3	(Oman) (Fiji)	Haithem Al-Jabri / Mohammed Al-Nabhani; David O'Connor / Sanjeev Tikaram	3; 6	6; 4	6; 4

=== Group B ===
==== Pacific Oceania vs. Jordan ====
Pacific Oceania
2
Abu Dhabi Airport Golf and Tennis Club, Abu Dhabi, United Arab Emirates
25 April 2001

Jordan
1

			1	2	3
1	(Pacific Oceania) (Jordan)	Lency Tenai; Laith Azzouni	2; 6	6; 3	6; 2
2	(Pacific Oceania) (Jordan)	Lawrence Tere; Ahmed Ibrahim Ahmad Alhadid	4; 6	6; 2	3; 6
3	(Pacific Oceania) (Jordan)	Lency Tenai / Lawrence Tere; Amru Al-Abidi / Laith Azzouni	6; 2	6; 2

==== United Arab Emirates vs. Brunei ====
United Arab Emirates
3
Abu Dhabi Airport Golf and Tennis Club, Abu Dhabi, United Arab Emirates
25 April 2001

Brunei
0

			1	2	3
1	(United Arab Emirates) (Brunei)	Mahmoud Nader Al-Blooshi; Rui Chok-kah	6; 1	6; 3
2	(United Arab Emirates) (Brunei)	Omar Alawadhi; Billy Kee-loong Wong	6; 3	6; 4
3	(United Arab Emirates) (Brunei)	Omar Alawadhi / Mahmoud Nader Al-Blooshi; Rui Chok-kah / Billy Kee-loong Wong	6; 3	6; 0

==== Pacific Oceania vs. United Arab Emirates ====
Pacific Oceania
1
Abu Dhabi Airport Golf and Tennis Club, Abu Dhabi, United Arab Emirates
26 April 2001

United Arab Emirates
2

			1	2	3
1	(Pacific Oceania) (United Arab Emirates)	Lency Tenai; Mahmoud Nader Al-Blooshi	6; 4	7^{7} 6^{4}
2	(Pacific Oceania) (United Arab Emirates)	Lawrence Tere; Omar Alawadhi	3; 6	0; 6
3	(Pacific Oceania) (United Arab Emirates)	Lency Tenai / Lawrence Tere; Omar Alawadhi / Mahmoud Nader Al-Blooshi	2; 6	6; 3	9; 11

==== Jordan vs. Brunei ====
Jordan
3
Abu Dhabi Airport Golf and Tennis Club, Abu Dhabi, United Arab Emirates
26 April 2001

Brunei
0

			1	2	3
1	(Jordan) (Brunei)	Laith Azzouni; Rui Chok-kah	6; 2	6; 4
2	(Jordan) (Brunei)	Ahmed Ibrahim Ahmad Alhadid; Billy Kee-loong Wong	6; 0	6; 3
3	(Jordan) (Brunei)	Laith Azzouni / Fabio Badra; Rui Chok-kah / Billy Kee-loong Wong	6; 1	6; 1

==== Pacific Oceania vs. Brunei ====
Pacific Oceania
3
Abu Dhabi Airport Golf and Tennis Club, Abu Dhabi, United Arab Emirates
27 April 2001

Brunei
0

			1	2	3
1	(Pacific Oceania) (Brunei)	Muka Godinet; Rui Chok-kah	6; 1	6; 1
2	(Pacific Oceania) (Brunei)	Lawrence Tere; Billy Kee-loong Wong	6; 2	6; 0
3	(Pacific Oceania) (Brunei)	Muka Godinet / Lawrence Tere; Rui Chok-kah / Billy Kee-loong Wong	6; 0	6; 0

==== Jordan vs. United Arab Emirates ====
Jordan
1
Abu Dhabi Airport Golf and Tennis Club, Abu Dhabi, United Arab Emirates
27 April 2001

United Arab Emirates
2

			1	2	3
1	(Jordan) (United Arab Emirates)	Ahmed Ibrahim Ahmad Alhadid; Mahmoud Nader Al-Blooshi	7; 5	6; 2
2	(Jordan) (United Arab Emirates)	Fabio Badra; Omar Alawadhi	6; 3	2; 6	3; 6
3	(Jordan) (United Arab Emirates)	Ahmed Ibrahim Ahmad Alhadid / Laith Azzouni; Omar Alawadhi / Mahmoud Nader Al-Blooshi	3; 6	4; 6

== 1st to 4th place play-offs ==
=== Semifinals ===
==== Pacific Oceania vs. Iraq ====
Pacific Oceania
2
Abu Dhabi Airport Golf and Tennis Club, Abu Dhabi, United Arab Emirates
28 April 2001

Iraq
1

			1	2	3
1	(Pacific Oceania) (Iraq)	Muka Godinet; Saddam-Hussain Kadhim	2; 6	1; 6
2	(Pacific Oceania) (Iraq)	Lawrence Tere; Hussain Rasheed	7; 5	6; 1
3	(Pacific Oceania) (Iraq)	Lency Tenai / Lawrence Tere; Nasir Al-Hatam / Saddam-Hussain Kadhim	6; 4	6; 2

==== United Arab Emirates vs. Oman ====
United Arab Emirates
2
Abu Dhabi Airport Golf and Tennis Club, Abu Dhabi, United Arab Emirates
28 April 2001

Oman
1

			1	2	3
1	(United Arab Emirates) (Oman)	Mahmoud Nader Al-Blooshi; Saleh Al-Zadjali	4; 6	3; 6
2	(United Arab Emirates) (Oman)	Omar Alawadhi; Mohammed Al-Nabhani	5; 7	6; 3	6; 2
3	(United Arab Emirates) (Oman)	Omar Alawadhi / Mahmoud Nader Al-Blooshi; Haithem Al-Jabri / Mohammed Al-Nabhani	6; 4	6; 4

=== Final ===
==== United Arab Emirates vs. Pacific Oceania ====
United Arab Emirates
2
Abu Dhabi Airport Golf and Tennis Club, Abu Dhabi, United Arab Emirates
29 April 2001

Pacific Oceania
1

			1	2	3
1	(United Arab Emirates) (Pacific Oceania)	Mohammed Abdel-Aziz Al-Nuaimi; Muka Godinet	3; 6	1; 6
2	(United Arab Emirates) (Pacific Oceania)	Omar Alawadhi; Lawrence Tere	6; 1	3; 6	6; 2
3	(United Arab Emirates) (Pacific Oceania)	Omar Alawadhi / Mahmoud Nader Al-Blooshi; Lency Tenai / Lawrence Tere	6; 3	6; 2

=== 3rd to 4th play-off ===
==== Iraq vs. Oman ====
Iraq
3
Abu Dhabi Airport Golf and Tennis Club, Abu Dhabi, United Arab Emirates
29 April 2001

Oman
0

			1	2	3
1	(Iraq) (Oman)	Saddam-Hussain Kadhim; Haithem Al-Jabri	6; 1	6; 2
2	(Iraq) (Oman)	Hussain Rasheed; Mohammed Al-Nabhani	6; 1	6; 0
3	(Iraq) (Oman)	Nasir Al-Hatam / Haidar Kadhim; Haithem Al-Jabri / Saleh Al-Zadjali	6; 0	6; 1

== 5th to 8th place play-offs ==
=== 5th to 8th play-offs ===
==== Brunei vs. Bangladesh ====
Brunei
2
Abu Dhabi Airport Golf and Tennis Club, Abu Dhabi, United Arab Emirates
28 April 2001

Bangladesh
1

			1	2	3
1	(Brunei) (Bangladesh)	Rui Chok-kah; Lakhan Lal	4; 6	6; 4	6; 2
2	(Brunei) (Bangladesh)	Billy Kee-loong Wong; Dilip Passia	1; 6	6; 4	6; 1
3	(Brunei) (Bangladesh)	Zuraimi-Abdul Sani / Mohammed Ridzuan-Yunos; Abu-Hena-Tasawar Collins / Dilip Passia	0; 6	1; 6

==== Jordan vs. Fiji ====
Jordan
2
Abu Dhabi Airport Golf and Tennis Club, Abu Dhabi, United Arab Emirates
28 April 2001

Fiji
1

			1	2	3
1	(Jordan) (Fiji)	Laith Azzouni; Ajay Raniga	6; 4	6; 2
2	(Jordan) (Fiji)	Ahmed Ibrahim Ahmad Alhadid; Valu Fa	6; 0	6; 0
3	(Jordan) (Fiji)	Laith Azzouni / Fabio Badra; David O'Connor / Sanjeev Tikaram	3; 6	6; 2	4; 6

=== 5th to 6th play-off ===
==== Fiji vs. Bangladesh ====
Fiji
2
Abu Dhabi Airport Golf and Tennis Club, Abu Dhabi, United Arab Emirates
29 April 2001

Bangladesh
1

			1	2	3
1	(Fiji) (Bangladesh)	Ajay Raniga; Abu-Hena-Tasawar Collins	3; 6	0; 6
2	(Fiji) (Bangladesh)	Sanjeev Tikaram; Dilip Passia	6; 2	6; 2
3	(Fiji) (Bangladesh)	David O'Connor / Sanjeev Tikaram; Lakhan Lal / Dilip Passia	6; 3	6; 0

=== 7th to 8th play-off ===
==== Brunei vs. Jordan ====
Brunei
0
Abu Dhabi Airport Golf and Tennis Club, Abu Dhabi, United Arab Emirates
29 April 2001

Jordan
3

			1	2	3
1	(Brunei) (Jordan)	Rui Chok-kah; Laith Azzouni	2; 6	0; 6
2	(Brunei) (Jordan)	Billy Kee-loong Wong; Fabio Badra	6; 2	5; 7	1; 6
3	(Brunei) (Jordan)	Rui Chok-kah / Billy Kee-loong Wong; Ahmed Ibrahim Ahmad Alhadid / Laith Azzouni	2; 6	0; 6
