= 2006 Davis Cup Asia/Oceania Zone Group III =

International tennis competition

The Group III tournament was held July 19–23, in Manila Polo Club, Makati City, Manila, Philippines, on indoor clay courts.

== Format ==
The eight teams were split into two groups and played in a round-robin format. The top two teams of each group advanced to the promotion pool, from which the two top teams were promoted to the Asia/Oceania Zone Group II in 2007. The bottom two teams of each group were placed in the relegation pool, from which the two bottom teams were demoted to the Asia/Oceania Zone Group IV in 2007.

== Pool A ==
	Group A	PHI	SRI	VIE	SIN
1	Philippines (3–0)		3–0	3–0	3–0
2	Sri Lanka (2–1)	0–3		2–1	3–0
3	Vietnam (1–2)	0–3	1–2		2–1
4	Singapore (0–3)	0–3	0–3	1–2	

=== Philippines vs. Sri Lanka ===
Philippines
3
Manila Polo Club, Makati City, Manila, Philippines
19 July 2006
Clay (indoors)

Sri Lanka
0

			1	2	3
1	(Philippines) (Sri Lanka)	Eric Taino; Amrit Rupasinghe	6; 0	6; 1
2	(Philippines) (Sri Lanka)	Cecil Mamiit; Harshana Godamanna	6; 4	6; 2
3	(Philippines) (Sri Lanka)	Eric Taino / Cecil Mamiit; Rohan de Silva / Rajeev Rajapakse	6; 2	6; 1

=== Vietnam vs. Singapore ===
Vietnam
2
Manila Polo Club, Makati City, Manila, Philippines
19 July 2006
Clay (indoors)

Singapore
1

			1	2	3
1	(Vietnam) (Singapore)	Lê Quốc Khánh; Stanley Armando	6; 2	6; 1
2	(Vietnam) (Singapore)	Đỗ Minh Quân; Min-Sylvester Wee	6; 0	6; 4
3	(Vietnam) (Singapore)	Lâm Quang Trí / Trần Thanh Hoàng; Daniel Heryanta Dewandaka / Kok-Huen Kam	6^{4} 7^{7}	2; 6

=== Philippines vs. Singapore ===
Philippines
3
Manila Polo Club, Makati City, Manila, Philippines
20 July 2006
Clay (indoors)

Singapore
0

			1	2	3
1	(Philippines) (Singapore)	Eric Taino; Min-Sylvester Wee	6; 0	6; 0
2	(Philippines) (Singapore)	Cecil Mamiit; Kok-Huen Kam	6; 1	6; 0
3	(Philippines) (Singapore)	Johnny Arcilla / Patrick John Tierro; Kok-Huen Kam / Min-Sylvester Wee	6; 3	6; 1

=== Vietnam vs. Sri Lanka ===
Vietnam
1
Manila Polo Club, Makati City, Manila, Philippines
20 July 2006
Clay (indoors)

Sri Lanka
2

			1	2	3
1	(Vietnam) (Sri Lanka)	Lê Quốc Khánh; Amrit Rupasinghe	6; 2	6; 2
2	(Vietnam) (Sri Lanka)	Đỗ Minh Quân; Harshana Godamanna	2; 6	1; 6
3	(Vietnam) (Sri Lanka)	Đỗ Minh Quân / Lê Quốc Khánh; Rohan de Silva / Harshana Godamanna	4; 6	7^{7} 6^{4}	1; 6

=== Philippines vs. Vietnam ===
Philippines
3
Manila Polo Club, Makati City, Manila, Philippines
21 July 2006
Clay (indoors)

Vietnam
0

			1	2	3
1	(Philippines) (Vietnam)	Eric Taino; Trần Thanh Hoàng	6; 0	6; 1
2	(Philippines) (Vietnam)	Cecil Mamiit; Đỗ Minh Quân	7; 5	5; 7	6; 1
3	(Philippines) (Vietnam)	Johnny Arcilla / Patrick John Tierro; Lâm Quang Trí / Trần Thanh Hoàng	6; 3	7; 5

=== Sri Lanka vs. Singapore ===
Sri Lanka
3
Manila Polo Club, Makati City, Manila, Philippines
21 July 2006
Clay (indoors)

Singapore
0

			1	2	3
1	(Sri Lanka) (Singapore)	Amrit Rupasinghe; Stanley Armando	6; 4	6; 0
2	(Sri Lanka) (Singapore)	Harshana Godamanna; Min-Sylvester Wee	6; 1	6; 3
3	(Sri Lanka) (Singapore)	Rohan de Silva / Rajeev Rajapakse; Kok-Huen Kam / Min-Sylvester Wee	7; 5	6; 4

== Pool B ==
	Group B	IRI	KSA	BRN	BAN
1	Iran (3–0)		3–0	3–0	3–0
2	Saudi Arabia (2–1)	0–3		2–1	2–1
3	Bahrain (1–2)	0–3	1–2		2–1
4	Bangladesh (0–3)	0–3	1–2	1–2	

=== Iran vs. Saudi Arabia ===
Iran
3
Manila Polo Club, Makati City, Manila, Philippines
19 July 2006
Clay (indoors)

Saudi Arabia
0

			1	2	3
1	(Iran) (Saudi Arabia)	Anoosha Shahgholi; Fahad Al Saad	0; 6	6; 1	6; 1
2	(Iran) (Saudi Arabia)	Ashkan Shokoofi; Omar Althagib	6; 1	6; 2
3	(Iran) (Saudi Arabia)	Anoosha Shahgholi / Ashkan Shokoofi; Fahad Al Saad / Omar Althagib	6; 1	6; 4

=== Bahrain vs. Bangladesh ===
Bahrain
2
Manila Polo Club, Makati City, Manila, Philippines
19 July 2006
Clay (indoors)

Bangladesh
1

			1	2	3
1	(Bahrain) (Bangladesh)	Abdul-Rahman Shehab; Shibu Lal	3; 6	6^{6} 7^{8}
2	(Bahrain) (Bangladesh)	Khaled Al Thawadi; Sree-Amol Roy	6; 4	7^{8} 6^{6}
3	(Bahrain) (Bangladesh)	Khaled Al Thawadi / Abdul-Rahman Shehab; Shibu Lal / Henry Prithul Mondol	6; 1	6; 4

=== Iran vs. Bangladesh ===
Iran
3
Manila Polo Club, Makati City, Manila, Philippines
20 July 2006
Clay (indoors)

Bangladesh
0

			1	2	3
1	(Iran) (Bangladesh)	Anoosha Shahgholi; Henry Prithul Mondol	6; 3	6; 1
2	(Iran) (Bangladesh)	Ashkan Shokoofi; Shibu Lal	6; 1	6; 1
3	(Iran) (Bangladesh)	Ashkan Shokoofi / Farshad Talavar; Md Tajmul Islam / Shibu Lal	6; 1	6; 4

=== Bahrain vs. Saudi Arabia ===
Bahrain
1
Manila Polo Club, Makati City, Manila, Philippines
20 July 2006
Clay (indoors)

Saudi Arabia
2

			1	2	3
1	(Bahrain) (Saudi Arabia)	Abdul-Rahman Shehab; Fahad Al Saad	1; 6	2; 6
2	(Bahrain) (Saudi Arabia)	Khaled Al Thawadi; Omar Althagib	6; 0	6; 3
3	(Bahrain) (Saudi Arabia)	Khaled Al Thawadi / Abdul-Rahman Shehab; Bader Mohammed Almuqail / Fahad Al Saad	2; 6	5; 7

=== Iran vs. Bahrain ===
Iran
3
Manila Polo Club, Makati City, Manila, Philippines
21 July 2006
Clay (indoors)

Bahrain
0

			1	2	3
1	(Iran) (Bahrain)	Anoosha Shahgholi; Khaled Al Thawadi	6; 4	6; 1
2	(Iran) (Bahrain)	Ashkan Shokoofi; Hamad Al Nusuf	6; 4	6; 2
3	(Iran) (Bahrain)	Mohammed Mohazebnia / Farshad Talavar; Khaled Al Thawadi / Abdul-Rahman Shehab	2; 6	6; 4	8; 6

=== Saudi Arabia vs. Bangladesh ===
Saudi Arabia
2
Manila Polo Club, Makati City, Manila, Philippines
21 July 2006
Clay (indoors)

Bangladesh
1

			1	2	3
1	(Saudi Arabia) (Bangladesh)	Fahad Al Saad; Henry Prithul Mondol	6; 1	6; 2
2	(Saudi Arabia) (Bangladesh)	Omar Althagib; Shibu Lal	6^{6} 7^{8}	1; 4		retired
3	(Saudi Arabia) (Bangladesh)	Bader Mohammed Almuqail / Fahad Al Saad; Shibu Lal / Sree-Amol Roy	2; 6	6; 3	6; 2

== Promotion pool ==
The top two teams from each of Pools A and B advanced to the Promotion pool. Results and points from games against the opponent from the preliminary round were carried forward.

(scores in italics carried over from Groups)

	1st–4th Play-off	PHI	IRI	SRI	KSA
1	Philippines (3–0)		3–0	3–0	3–0
2	Iran (2–1)	0–3		2–1	3–0
3	Sri Lanka (1–2)	0–3	1–2		2–1
4	Saudi Arabia (0–3)	0–3	0–3	1–2	

Philippines and Iran promoted to Group II in 2007.

=== Philippines vs. Saudi Arabia ===
Philippines
3
Manila Polo Club, Makati City, Manila, Philippines
22 July 2006
Clay (indoors)

Saudi Arabia
0

			1	2	3
1	(Philippines) (Saudi Arabia)	Eric Taino; Fahad Al Saad	1; 6	6; 0	6; 3
2	(Philippines) (Saudi Arabia)	Cecil Mamiit; Saleh Alrajeh	6; 0	6; 0
3	(Philippines) (Saudi Arabia)	Johnny Arcilla / Patrick John Tierro; Bader Mohammed Almuqail / Saleh Alrajeh	6; 2	6; 2

=== Sri Lanka vs. Iran ===
Sri Lanka
1
Manila Polo Club, Makati City, Manila, Philippines
22 July 2006
Clay (indoors)

Iran
2

			1	2	3
1	(Sri Lanka) (Iran)	Amrit Rupasinghe; Anoosha Shahgholi	1; 6	3; 6
2	(Sri Lanka) (Iran)	Harshana Godamanna; Ashkan Shokoofi	4; 6	6; 4	6; 3
3	(Sri Lanka) (Iran)	Rohan de Silva / Rajeev Rajapakse; Anoosha Shahgholi / Ashkan Shokoofi	4; 6	2; 6

=== Philippines vs. Iran ===
Philippines
3
Manila Polo Club, Makati City, Manila, Philippines
23 July 2006
Clay (indoors)

Iran
0

			1	2	3
1	(Philippines) (Iran)	Eric Taino; Farshad Talavar	6; 1	7^{7} 6^{4}
2	(Philippines) (Iran)	Cecil Mamiit; Anoosha Shahgholi	6; 3	6; 1
3	(Philippines) (Iran)	Johnny Arcilla / Patrick John Tierro; Anoosha Shahgholi / Ashkan Shokoofi	6; 3	6; 1

=== Sri Lanka vs. Saudi Arabia ===
Sri Lanka
2
Manila Polo Club, Makati City, Manila, Philippines
23 July 2006
Clay (indoors)

Saudi Arabia
1

			1	2	3
1	(Sri Lanka) (Saudi Arabia)	Rajeev Rajapakse; Fahad Al Saad	3; 6	1; 6
2	(Sri Lanka) (Saudi Arabia)	Harshana Godamanna; Saleh Alrajeh	6; 4	6; 2
3	(Sri Lanka) (Saudi Arabia)	Rohan de Silva / Harshana Godamanna; Bader Mohammed Almuqail / Fahad Al Saad	6; 2	6; 0

== Relegation pool ==
The bottom two teams from Pools A and B were placed in the relegation group. Results and points from games against the opponent from the preliminary round were carried forward.

(scores in italics carried over from Groups)

	5th–8th Play-off	VIE	SIN	BRN	BAN
1	Vietnam (3–0)		2–1	3–0	2–1
2	Singapore (2–1)	1–2		2–1	2–1
3	Bahrain (1–2)	0–3	1–2		2–1
4	Bangladesh (0–3)	1–2	1–2	1–2	

Bahrain and Bangladesh relegated to Group IV in 2007.

=== Vietnam vs. Bangladesh ===
Vietnam
2
Manila Polo Club, Makati City, Manila, Philippines
22 July 2006
Clay (indoors)

Bangladesh
1

			1	2	3
1	(Vietnam) (Bangladesh)	Lê Quốc Khánh; Shibu Lal	0; 6			retired
2	(Vietnam) (Bangladesh)	Đỗ Minh Quân; Sree-Amol Roy	6; 4	6; 2
3	(Vietnam) (Bangladesh)	Đỗ Minh Quân / Trần Thanh Hoàng; Shibu Lal / Sree-Amol Roy	6; 0	6; 1

=== Singapore vs. Bahrain ===
Singapore
2
Manila Polo Club, Makati City, Manila, Philippines
22 July 2006
Clay (indoors)

Bahrain
1

			1	2	3
1	(Singapore) (Bahrain)	Daniel Heryanta Dewandaka; Abdul-Rahman Shehab	4; 6	2; 6
2	(Singapore) (Bahrain)	Kok-Huen Kam; Khaled Al Thawadi	4; 6	7; 5	6; 3
3	(Singapore) (Bahrain)	Stanley Armando / Daniel Heryanta Dewandaka; Khaled Al Thawadi / Abdul-Rahman Shehab	6; 4	4; 6	8; 6

=== Vietnam vs. Bahrain ===
Vietnam
3
Manila Polo Club, Makati City, Manila, Philippines
23 July 2006
Clay (indoors)

Bahrain
0

			1	2	3
1	(Vietnam) (Bahrain)	Trần Thanh Hoàng; Abdul-Rahman Shehab	6; 3	6; 2
2	(Vietnam) (Bahrain)	Đỗ Minh Quân; Hamad Al Nusuf	6; 0	6; 1
3	(Vietnam) (Bahrain)	Đỗ Minh Quân / Trần Thanh Hoàng; Hamad Al Nusuf / Khaled Al Thawadi	6; 2	6; 3

=== Singapore vs. Bangladesh ===
Singapore
2
Manila Polo Club, Makati City, Manila, Philippines
23 July 2006
Clay (indoors)

Bangladesh
1

			1	2	3
1	(Singapore) (Bangladesh)	Min-Sylvester Wee; Shibu Lal	6; 3	3; 6	4; 6
2	(Singapore) (Bangladesh)	Kok-Huen Kam; Sree-Amol Roy	6; 4	7; 5
3	(Singapore) (Bangladesh)	Daniel Heryanta Dewandaka / Kok-Huen Kam; Shibu Lal / Sree-Amol Roy	6; 0	6; 2
