= 1993 Davis Cup =

1993 edition of the Davis Cup

Details
- Duration: 26 March – 5 December 1993
- Edition: 82nd
- Teams: 100

Champion
- Winning nation: Germany

The 1993 Davis Cup (also known as the 1993 Davis Cup by NEC for sponsorship purposes) was the 82nd edition of the Davis Cup, the most important tournament between national teams in men's tennis. 100 teams would enter the competition, 16 in the World Group, 22 in the Americas Zone, 23 in the Asia/Oceania Zone, and 39 in the Europe/Africa Zone. Benin, Croatia, the Czech Republic, Djibouti, Latvia, Russia, San Marino, Slovenia, Ukraine and the United Arab Emirates made their first appearances in the tournament.

Germany defeated Australia in the final, held at the Messe Düsseldorf Exhibition Hall in Düsseldorf, Germany, on 3–5 December, to win their 3rd title overall.

== World Group ==
Participating teams
Australia	Austria	Brazil	Cuba
Czech Republic (Note: The Czech Republic replaced Czechoslovakia in the World Group and assumed all historical records for the former country.)	Denmark	France	Germany
India	Italy	Netherlands	Russia (Note: Russia took over the place in the World Group gained by the CIS in the 1992 Davis Cup, and assumed all historical records held by the Soviet Union. Former Soviet states and newly independent countries Estonia, Latvia and Ukraine would all begin as new nations in Group III.)
Spain	Sweden	Switzerland	United States

=== Draw ===
First round 26–28 March
Melbourne, Australia (grass)
United States	1
Australia	4
Modena, Italy (indoor carpet)
Italy	4
Brazil	1
Vienna, Austria (indoor clay)
France	4
Austria	1
Calcutta, India (grass)
Switzerland	2
India	3
Barcelona, Spain (clay)
Netherlands	3
Spain	2
Kalmar, Sweden (indoor carpet)
Cuba	0
Sweden	5
Aarhus, Denmark (indoor carpet)
Denmark	1
Czech Republic	4
Moscow, Russia (indoor carpet)
Russia	1
Germany	4

Quarterfinals; 16–18 July
Florence, Italy (clay)
Australia	3
Italy	2
Fréjus, France (clay)
France	2
India	3
The Hague, Netherlands (clay)
Netherlands	1
Sweden	4
Halle, Germany (grass)
Czech Republic	1
Germany	4

Semifinals; 24–26 September
Chandigarh, India (grass)
Australia	5
India	0
Borlänge, Sweden (indoor clay)
Sweden	0
Germany	5

Final; 3–5 December
Düsseldorf, Germany (indoor clay)
Australia	1
Germany	4

=== Final ===
Germany vs. Australia

Germany
4
Messe Düsseldorf Exhibition Hall, Düsseldorf, Germany
3–5 December 1993
Clay (indoors)

Australia
1

			1	2	3	4	5
1	(Germany) (Australia)	Michael Stich; Jason Stoltenberg	6^{2} 7^{7}	6; 3	6; 1	4; 6	6; 3
2	(Germany) (Australia)	Marc-Kevin Goellner; Richard Fromberg	6; 3	7; 5	6^{8} 7^{10}	2; 6	7; 9
3	(Germany) (Australia)	Patrik Kühnen / Michael Stich; Todd Woodbridge / Mark Woodforde	7^{7} 6^{4}	4; 6	6; 3	7^{7} 6^{4}
4	(Germany) (Australia)	Michael Stich; Richard Fromberg	6; 4	6; 2	6; 2
5	(Germany) (Australia)	Marc-Kevin Goellner; Jason Stoltenberg	6; 1	6^{2} 7^{7}	7^{7} 6^{3}

== World Group qualifying round ==
Date: 22–27 September

The eight losing teams in the World Group first round ties and eight winners of the Zonal Group I final round ties competed in the World Group qualifying round for spots in the 1994 World Group.

Home team	Score	Visiting team	Location	Venue	Door	Surface
Israel	3-2	Switzerland	Ramat HaSharon	Canada Stadium	Outdoor	Hard
Hungary	4-1	Argentina	Budapest	Újpesti Torna Egylet	Outdoor	Clay
New Zealand	2-3	Austria	Christchurch	Pioneer Stadium	Indoor	Carpet
United States	5-0	Bahamas	Charlotte, NC	Olde Province Racquet Club	Outdoor	Hard
Belgium	3-1	Brazil	Brussels	Royal Primerose Tennis Club	Outdoor	Clay
Denmark	3-2	Croatia	Copenhagen	K.B. Hallen	Indoor	Carpet
Russia	5-0	Cuba	Saint Petersburg	Sports Forum	Indoor	Carpet
South Korea	0-5	Spain	Seoul	Olympic Park Tennis Center	Outdoor	Hard

- Austria, Denmark, Russia, Spain and United States remain in the World Group in 1994.
- Belgium, Hungary and Israel are promoted to the World Group in 1994.
- Argentina, Bahamas, Croatia, New Zealand and South Korea remain in Zonal Group I in 1994.
- Brazil, Cuba and Switzerland are relegated to Zonal Group I in 1994.

== Americas Zone ==
=== Group I ===
First Round; 5–7 February
Uruguay
bye
Santiago, Chile (clay)
Bahamas	3
Chile	2
Mexico City, Mexico (clay)
Mexico	4
Canada	1
bye
Argentina

Second Round; 26–28 March
Nassau, Bahamas (hard)
Uruguay	1
Bahamas	4
Buenos Aires, Argentina (clay)
Mexico	1
Argentina	4

- Bahamas and Argentina advance to World Group qualifying round.

Relegation Play-off; 26–28 March
Santiago, Chile (clay)
Chile	3
Canada	1

- Canada relegated to Group II in 1994.

=== Group II ===
Relegation Play-offs
Bogotá, Colombia (clay)
Dominican Republic	1
Colombia	4
Caracas, Venezuela (clay)
Haiti	2
Venezuela	3

First Round
Santo Domingo, Dominican Rep. (clay)
Paraguay	3
Dominican Republic	2
Lima, Peru (clay)
Colombia	2
Peru	3
Port-au-Prince, Haiti (clay)
Puerto Rico	5
Haiti	0
Guayaquil, Ecuador (clay)
Ecuador	4
Venezuela	1

Second Round
Lima, Peru (clay)
Paraguay	0
Peru	5
Guayaquil, Ecuador (clay)
Puerto Rico	3
Ecuador	2

Third Round
Lima, Peru (clay)
Peru	5
Puerto Rico	0

- Colombia and Haiti relegated to Group III in 1994.
- Peru promoted to Group I in 1994.

=== Group III ===
- Venue: Cariari Country Club, San José, Costa Rica
- Date: 8–14 March

	GUA	JAM	ESA	ECA	CRC	BOL	TRI	BAR	RR; W–L	Match; W–L	Set; W–L	Standings
Guatemala		3–0	2–1	1–2	2–1	3–0	3–0	3–0	6–1	17–4 (81%)	37–11 (77%)	1
Jamaica	0–3		2–1	2–1	3–0	3–0	2–1	2–1	6–1	14–7 (67%)	32–19 (63%)	2
El Salvador	1–2	1–2		2–1	2–1	2–1	2–1	2–1	5–2	12–9 (57%)	27–24 (53%)	3
Eastern Caribbean	2–1	1–2	1–2		3–0	1–2	2–1	3–0	4–3	13–8 (62%)	28–17 (62%)	4
Costa Rica	1–2	0–3	1–2	0–3		2–1	3–0	2–1	3–4	9–12 (43%)	26–28 (48%)	5
Bolivia	0–3	0–3	1–2	2–1	1–2		1–2	3–0	2–5	8–13 (38%)	19–28 (40%)	6
Trinidad and Tobago	0–3	1–2	1–2	1–2	0–3	2–1		1–2	1–6	6–15 (29%)	14–33 (30%)	7
Barbados	0–3	1–2	1–2	0–3	1–2	0–3	2–1		1–6	5–16 (24%)	12–35 (26%)	8

- Guatemala and Jamaica promoted to Group II in 1994.

== Asia/Oceania Zone ==
=== Group I ===
Preliminary Round; 5–7 February
Manila, Philippines (indoor clay)
Philippines	4
Chinese Taipei	1

- Chinese Taipei relegated to Group II in 1994.

First Round; 26–29 March
South Korea
bye
Jakarta, Indonesia (clay)
Philippines	2
Indonesia	3
Causeway Bay, Hong Kong (hard)
Japan	5
Hong Kong	0
bye
New Zealand

Second Round; 30 April–2 May
Seoul, South Korea (clay)
South Korea	5
Indonesia	0
Saga, Japan (indoor carpet)
Japan	2
New Zealand	3

- South Korea and New Zealand advance to World Group qualifying round.

=== Group II ===
Relegation Play-offs
Amman, Jordan (hard)
Malaysia	4
Jordan	1
Mishref, Kuwait (hard)
Sri Lanka	5
Kuwait	0

First Round
Kuala Lumpur, Malaysia (indoor hard)
China	4
Malaysia	1
Amman, Jordan (indoor hard)
Jordan	0
Iran	5
Lahore, Pakistan (grass)
Sri Lanka	1
Pakistan	4
Bangkok, Thailand (hard)
Kuwait	0
Thailand	5

Second Round
Tehran, Iran (clay)
China	3
Iran	2
Bangkok, Thailand (hard)
Pakistan	0
Thailand	5

Third Round
Tianjin, China (indoor hard)
China	4
Thailand	1

- Malaysia and Sri Lanka relegated to Group III in 1994.
- China promoted to Group I in 1994.

=== Group III ===
- Venue: Khalifa International Tennis and Squash Complex, Doha, Qatar
- Date: 19–25 April

	SIN	KSA	LIB	UAE	BHR	BAN	SYR	QAT	RR; W–L	Match; W–L	Set; W–L	Standings
Singapore		0–3	2–1	2–1	3–0	2–1	3–0	3–0	6–1	15–6 (71%)	32–18 (64%)	1
Saudi Arabia	3–0		2–1	2–1	2–1	1–2	2–1	3–0	6–1	15–6 (71%)	32–18 (64%)	2
Lebanon	1–2	1–2		2–1	1–2	2–1	3–0	3–0	4–3	13–8 (62%)	27–18 (60%)	3
United Arab Emirates	1–2	1–2	1–2		2–1	2–1	2–1	3–0	4–3	12–9 (57%)	26–19 (58%)	4
Bahrain	1–2	0–3	2–1	1–2		2–1	2–1	3–0	4–3	11–10 (52%)	27–21 (56%)	5
Bangladesh	2–1	1–2	1–2	1–2	1–2		3–0	3–0	3–4	12–9 (57%)	26–21 (55%)	6
Syria	1–2	0–3	0–3	1–2	1–2	0–3		2–1	1–6	5–16 (24%)	14–34 (29%)	7
Qatar	0–3	0–3	0–3	0–3	0–3	0–3	1–2		0–7	1–20 (5%)	5–40 (11%)	8

- Singapore and Saudi Arabia promoted to Group II in 1994.

== Europe/Africa Zone ==
=== Group I ===
First Round
Israel
bye
bye
Portugal
Esch-sur-Alzette, Luxembourg (indoor carpet)
Kenya	1
Luxembourg	4
bye
Belgium
Great Britain
bye
Budapest, Hungary (indoor carpet)
Finland	1
Hungary	4
Oslo, Norway (indoor carpet)
Norway	1
Zimbabwe	4
bye
Croatia (Note: As the stronger tennis nation that began Davis Cup play immediately after the breakup of Yugoslavia, and due to the ongoing sanctions against the Federal Republic of Yugoslavia, Croatia took Yugoslavia's spot in Group I and Slovenia began as a new nation in Group III. Yugoslavia continued to hold their historical records when they resumed play in 1995, which were subsequently passed onto Serbia.)

Second Round
Lisbon, Portugal (clay)
Israel	3
Portugal	2
Waregem, Belgium (clay)
Luxembourg	0
Belgium	5
Budapest, Hungary (clay)
Great Britain	2
Hungary	3
Harare, Zimbabwe (indoor hard)
Zimbabwe	2
Croatia	3

- Israel, Belgium, Hungary and Croatia advance to World Group qualifying round.

Relegation Play-off
Helsinki, Finland (indoor carpet)
Finland	2
Norway	3

- Kenya and Finland relegated to Group II in 1994.

=== Group II ===
Relegation Play-offs
Abidjan, Ivory Coast (hard)
Poland	3
Ivory Coast	1
Carthage, Tunisia (clay)
Tunisia	0
Egypt	5
Accra, Ghana (hard)
Ghana	5
Cyprus	0
Lagos, Nigeria (hard)
Algeria	0
Nigeria	5

First Round
Sofia, Bulgaria (clay)
Poland	2
Bulgaria	3
Johannesburg, South Africa (hard)
Ivory Coast	0
South Africa	5
Athens, Greece (clay)
Greece	5
Tunisia	0
Dakar, Senegal (hard)
Senegal	4
Egypt	1
Dublin, Ireland (carpet)
Ghana	0
Ireland	5
Casablanca, Morocco (clay)
Cyprus	0
Morocco	5
Monte Carlo, Monaco (clay)
Algeria	1
Monaco	4
Lagos, Nigeria (hard)
Nigeria	1
Romania	4

Second Round
Sofia, Bulgaria (clay)
Bulgaria	1
South Africa	4
Dakar, Senegal (hard)
Greece	2
Senegal	3
Casablanca, Morocco (clay)
Ireland	2
Morocco	3
Monte Carlo, Monaco (clay)
Monaco	0
Romania	5

Third Round
Dakar, Senegal (hard)
South Africa	5
Senegal	0
Bucharest, Romania (clay)
Morocco	1
Romania	4

- Ivory Coast, Tunisia, Cyprus, and Algeria relegated to Group III in 1994.
- South Africa and Romania promoted to Group I in 1994.

=== Group III ===
Group A

- Venue: Lusaka Tennis Club, Lusaka, Zambia
- Date: 28 April–2 March

	LAT	SLO	ZAM	TUR	SMR	CGO	RR; W–L	Match; W–L	Set; W–L	Standings
Latvia		2–1	3–0	3–0	3–0	3–0	5–0	14–1 (93%)	29–4 (88%)	1
Slovenia	1–2		3–0	3–0	2–1	3–0	4–1	12–3 (80%)	26–9 (74%)	2
Zambia	0–3	0–3		2–1	3–0	3–0	3–2	8–7 (53%)	18–15 (55%)	3
Turkey	0–3	0–3	1–2		3–0	3–0	2–3	7–8 (47%)	15–18 (45%)	4
San Marino	0–3	1–2	0–3	0–3		3–0	1–4	4–11 (27%)	11–24 (31%)	5
Congo	0–3	0–3	0–3	0–3	0–3		0–5	0–15 (0%)	1–30 (3%)	6

- Latvia and Slovenia promoted to Group II in 1994.

Group B

- Venue: Marsa Sports Club, Marsa, Malta
- Date: 5–9 March

	UKR	EST	MLT	TOG	BEN	DJI	RR; W–L	Match; W–L	Set; W–L	Standings
Ukraine		3–0	3–0	3–0	3–0	3–0	5–0	15–0 (100%)	30–3 (91%)	1
Estonia	0–3		2–1	3–0	3–0	3–0	4–1	11–4 (73%)	23–11 (68%)	2
Malta	0–3	1–2		2–1	3–0	3–0	3–2	9–6 (60%)	21–15 (58%)	3
Togo	0–3	0–3	1–2		3–0	3–0	2–3	7–8 (47%)	18–18 (50%)	4
Benin	0–3	0–3	0–3	0–3		3–0	1–4	3–12 (20%)	9–24 (27%)	5
Djibouti	0–3	0–3	0–3	0–3	0–3		0–5	0–15 (0%)	0–30 (0%)	6

- Ukraine and Estonia promoted to Group II in 1994.
