= 1994 Davis Cup =

83rd edition of tennis team competition

Details
- Duration: 25 March – 4 December 1994
- Edition: 83rd
- Teams: 109

Champion
- Winning nation: Sweden

The 1994 Davis Cup (also known as the 1994 Davis Cup by NEC for sponsorship purposes) was the 83rd edition of the Davis Cup, the most important tournament between national teams in men's tennis. 109 teams would enter the competition, 16 in the World Group, 22 in the Americas Zone, 23 in the Asia/Oceania Zone, and 39 in the Europe/Africa Zone. Belarus, Brunei, Georgia, Lithuania, Oman, Slovakia, Sudan and Uzbekistan made their first appearances in the tournament.

Sweden defeated Russia in the final, held at the Olympic Stadium in Moscow, Russia, on 2–4 December, to win their 5th title overall.

== World Group ==
Participating teams
Australia	Austria	Belgium	Czech Republic
Denmark	France	Germany	Hungary
India	Israel	Italy	Netherlands
Russia	Spain	Sweden	United States

=== Draw ===
First round 25–27 March
New Delhi, India (grass)
United States	5
India	0
Eindhoven, Netherlands (indoor carpet)
Netherlands	5
Belgium	0
Lund, Sweden (indoor carpet)
Sweden	5
Denmark	0
Besançon, France (indoor hard)
France	4
Hungary	1
Ramat HaSharon, Israel (hard)
Israel	1
Czech Republic	4
Saint Petersburg, Russia (indoor carpet)
Russia	4
Australia	1
Madrid, Spain (clay)
Italy	1
Spain	4
Graz, Austria (indoor clay)
Austria	2
Germany	3

Quarterfinals; 15–17 July
Rotterdam, Netherlands (hard)
United States	3
Netherlands	2
Cannes, France (hard)
Sweden	3
France	2
Saint Petersburg, Russia (indoor carpet)
Czech Republic	2
Russia	3
Halle, Germany (grass)
Spain	2
Germany	3

Semifinals; 23–25 September
Gothenburg, Sweden (indoor carpet)
United States	2
Sweden	3
Hamburg, Germany (hard)
Russia	4
Germany	1

Final; 2–4 December
Moscow, Russia (indoor carpet)
Sweden	4
Russia	1

=== Final ===
Russia vs. Sweden

Russia
1
Olympic Stadium, Moscow, Russia
2–4 December 1994
Carpet (indoors)

Sweden
4

			1	2	3	4	5
1	(Russia) (Sweden)	Alexander Volkov; Stefan Edberg	4; 6	2; 6	7^{7} 6^{2}	6; 0	6; 8
2	(Russia) (Sweden)	Yevgeny Kafelnikov; Magnus Larsson	0; 6	2; 6	6; 3	6; 2	3; 6
3	(Russia) (Sweden)	Yevgeny Kafelnikov / Andrei Olhovskiy; Jan Apell / Jonas Björkman	7^{7} 6^{4}	2; 6	3; 6	6; 1	6; 8
4	(Russia) (Sweden)	Yevgeny Kafelnikov; Stefan Edberg	4; 6	6; 4	6; 0
5	(Russia) (Sweden)	Alexander Volkov; Magnus Larsson	6^{4} 7^{7}	4; 6

== World Group qualifying round ==
Date: 23–25 September

The eight losing teams in the World Group first round ties and eight winners of the Zonal Group I final round ties competed in the World Group qualifying round for spots in the 1995 World Group.

Home team	Score	Visiting team	Location	Venue	Door	Surface
New Zealand	1–4	Australia	Christchurch	King Edward Barracks	Indoor	Carpet
Uruguay	2–3	Austria	Montevideo	Carrasco Lawn Tennis Club	Outdoor	Clay
Israel	2–3	Belgium	Ramat HaSharon	Canada Stadium	Outdoor	Hard
Portugal	0–4	Croatia	Porto	Lawn Tennis Club da Foz	Outdoor	Clay
Denmark	4–1	Peru	Copenhagen	Valby-Hallen	Indoor	Carpet
Hungary	1–4	Italy	Budapest	Romai Tennis Academy	Outdoor	Clay
Indonesia	1–4	Switzerland	Jakarta	Gelora Senayan Sports Complex	Outdoor	Hard
India	2–3	South Africa	Jaipur	Jai Club Tennis Complex	Outdoor	Grass

- Australia, Austria, Belgium, Denmark and Italy remain in the World Group in 1995.
- Croatia, South Africa and Switzerland are promoted to the World Group in 1995.
- Indonesia, New Zealand, Peru, Portugal and Uruguay remain in Zonal Group I in 1995.
- Hungary, India and Israel are relegated to Zonal Group I in 1995.

== Americas Zone ==
=== Group I ===
Relegation Play-off; 25–27 March
Mexico City, Mexico (clay)
Cuba	0
Mexico	5

Preliminary Round; 4–6 February
Montevideo, Uruguay (clay)
Uruguay	5
Cuba	0
Lima, Peru (clay)
Mexico	2
Peru	3

- Cuba relegated to Group II in 1995.

First Round; 25–27 March
Argentina
bye
Montevideo, Uruguay (clay)
Bahamas	2
Uruguay	3
Lima, Peru (hard)
Peru	3
Chile	2
bye
Brazil

Second Round; 8–17 July
Montevideo, Uruguay (clay)
Argentina	2
Uruguay	3
Lima, Peru (clay)
Peru	3
Brazil	2

- Uruguay and Peru advance to World Group qualifying round.

=== Group II ===
Relegation Play-offs
Guatemala City, Guatemala (hard)
Jamaica	1
Guatemala	4
Asunción, Paraguay (clay)
Paraguay	4
Puerto Rico	1

First Round
Ottawa, Canada (indoor hard)
Canada	5
Jamaica	0
Guatemala City, Guatemala (hard)
Guatemala	0
Colombia	5
Asunción, Paraguay (clay)
Venezuela	4
Paraguay	1
San Juan, Puerto Rico (hard)
Ecuador	4
Puerto Rico	1

Second Round
Bogotá, Colombia (clay)
Canada	3
Colombia	2
Caracas, Venezuela (hard)
Venezuela	4
Ecuador	1

Third Round
Montreal, Canada (hard)
Canada	2
Venezuela	3

- Jamaica and Puerto Rico relegated to Group III in 1995.
- Venezuela promoted to Group I in 1995.

=== Group III ===
- Venue: St. Lucia Racquet Club, Gros Islet, Saint Lucia
- Date: 9–13 March

Rank	Team
1	Haiti
2	Bolivia
3	El Salvador
4	Dominican Republic
5	Costa Rica
6	Trinidad and Tobago
7	Eastern Caribbean
8	Barbados

- Haiti and Bolivia promoted to Group II in 1995.

== Asia/Oceania Zone ==
=== Group I ===
Preliminary Round; 4–6 February
Beijing, China (indoor carpet)
China	0
Japan	5

- China relegated to Group II in 1995.

First Round; 25–27 March
New Zealand
bye
Kyoto, Japan (indoor carpet)
Japan	5
Philippines	0
Causeway Bay, Hong Kong (hard)
Indonesia	3
Hong Kong	2
bye
South Korea

Second Round; 29 April–8 May
Christchurch, New Zealand (indoor carpet)
New Zealand	3
Japan	2
Jakarta, Indonesia (clay)
Indonesia	3
South Korea	2

- New Zealand and Indonesia advance to World Group qualifying round.

=== Group II ===
Relegation Play-offs
Singapore (hard)
Malaysia	4
Singapore	1
Colombo, Sri Lanka (clay)
Saudi Arabia	0
Sri Lanka	5

First Round
Taichung, Taiwan (clay)
Chinese Taipei	3
Malaysia	2
Singapore (hard)
Singapore	0
Pakistan	4
Riyadh, Saudi Arabia (hard)
Iran	3
Saudi Arabia	2
Bangkok, Thailand (hard)
Sri Lanka	0
Thailand	5

Second Round
Taichung, Taiwan (clay)
Chinese Taipei	3
Pakistan	2
Tehran, Iran (clay)
Iran	4
Thailand	1

Third Round
Taoyuan, Taiwan (indoor hard)
Chinese Taipei	4
Iran	1

- Singapore and Saudi Arabia relegated to Group III in 1995.
- Chinese Taipei promoted to Group I in 1995.

=== Group III ===
- Venue: Khalifa International Tennis and Squash Complex, Doha, Qatar
- Date: 6–10 April

Group A

	UZB	LIB	BHR	JOR	BRU	RR; W–L	Match; W–L	Set; W–L	Standings
Uzbekistan		3–0	3–0	3–0	3–0	4–0	12–0 (100%)	24–0 (100%)	1
Lebanon	0–3		2–1	3–0	2–1	3–1	7–5 (58%)	15–12 (56%)	2
Bahrain	0–3	1–2		2–1	3–0	2–2	6–6 (50%)	14–10 (58%)	3
Jordan	0–3	0–3	1–2		3–0	1–3	4–8 (33%)	7–17 (29%)	4
Brunei	0–3	1–2	0–3	0–3		0–4	1–11 (8%)	2–23 (8%)	5

Group B

	QAT	KUW	BAN	SYR	UAE	OMA	RR; W–L	Match; W–L	Set; W–L	Standings
Qatar		2–1	2–1	2–1	3–0	3–0	5–0	12–3 (80%)	27–7 (79%)	1
Kuwait	1–2		3–0	3–0	3–0	3–0	4–1	13–2 (87%)	27–5 (84%)	2
Bangladesh	1–2	0–3		2–1	2–1	3–0	3–2	8–7 (53%)	17–17 (50%)	3
Syria	1–2	0–3	1–2		3–0	2–1	2–3	7–8 (47%)	14–19 (42%)	4
United Arab Emirates	0–3	0–3	1–2	0–3		2–1	1–4	3–12 (20%)	8–24 (25%)	5
Oman	0–3	0–3	0–3	1–2	1–2		0–5	2–13 (13%)	5–26 (16%)	6

- Uzbekistan and Qatar promoted to Group II in 1995.

== Europe/Africa Zone ==
=== Group I ===
Preliminary Round; 4–6 February
Harare, Zimbabwe (indoor hard)
Zimbabwe	4
Luxembourg	1

First Round; 25–27 March
Johannesburg, South Africa (indoor hard)
South Africa	5
Romania	0
Porto, Portugal (clay)
Portugal	4
Great Britain	1
Zagreb, Croatia (indoor clay)
Croatia	3
Norway	2
Harare, Zimbabwe (indoor hard)
Zimbabwe	2
Switzerland	3

Relegation Play-off; 15–17 July
Manchester, United Kingdom (grass)
Romania	3
Great Britain	2

- South Africa, Portugal, Switzerland and Croatia advance to World Group qualifying round.
- Great Britain and Luxembourg relegated to Group II in 1995.

=== Group II ===
Relegation Play-offs
Dublin, Ireland (carpet)
Kenya	1
Ireland	4
Cairo, Egypt (clay)
Egypt	3
Bulgaria	2
Monte Carlo, Monaco (clay)
Monaco	4
Senegal	1
Athens, Greece (clay)
Greece	1
Estonia	4

First Round
Nairobi, Kenya (clay)
Kenya	1
Latvia	3
Dublin, Ireland (indoor carpet)
Ukraine	5
Ireland	0
Casablanca, Morocco (clay)
Morocco	5
Egypt	0
Sopot, Poland (indoor carpet)
Poland	4
Bulgaria	1
Accra, Ghana (hard)
Ghana	3
Monaco	2
Lagos, Nigeria (hard)
Nigeria	5
Senegal	0
Maribor, Slovenia (clay)
Slovenia	3
Greece	2
Helsinki, Finland (indoor carpet)
Estonia	1
Finland	4

Second Round
Jūrmala, Latvia (clay)
Latvia	3
Ukraine	2
Warsaw, Poland (clay)
Morocco	5
Poland	0
Accra, Ghana (hard)
Ghana	3
Nigeria	2
Ljubljana, Slovenia (clay)
Slovenia	3
Finland	2

Third Round
Jūrmala, Latvia (hard)
Latvia	1
Morocco	4
Accra, Ghana (hard)
Ghana	2
Slovenia	3

- Kenya, Bulgaria, Senegal, and Greece relegated to Group III in 1995.
- Morocco and Slovenia promoted to Group I in 1995.

=== Group III – Zone A ===
- Venue: Hôtel Ivoire, Abidjan, Ivory Coast
- Date: 4–8 May

Group A

	CIV	GEO	SMR	ZAM	DJI	RR; W–L	Match; W–L	Set; W–L	Standings
Ivory Coast		3–0	3–0	3–0	3–0	4–0	12–0 (100%)	24–1 (96%)	1
Georgia	0–3		2–1	3–0	3–0	3–1	8–4 (67%)	15–9 (63%)	2
San Marino	0–3	1–2		2–1	3–0	2–2	6–6 (50%)	14–12 (54%)	3
Zambia	0–3	0–3	1–2		3–0	1–3	4–8 (33%)	7–16 (30%)	4
Djibouti	0–3	0–3	0–3	0–3		0–4	0–12 (0%)	1–23 (4%)	5

Group B

	BLR	CMR	ALG	BEN	TOG	RR; W–L	Match; W–L	Set; W–L	Standings
Belarus		2–1	2–1	3–0	3–0	4–0	10–2 (83%)	20–5 (80%)	1
Cameroon	1–2		2–1	2–1	2–1	3–1	7–5 (58%)	16–12 (57%)	2
Algeria	1–2	1–2		3–0	3–0	2–2	8–4 (67%)	17–11 (61%)	3
Benin	0–3	1–2	0–3		2–1	1–3	3–9 (25%)	7–19 (27%)	4
Togo	0–3	1–2	0–3	1–2		0–4	2–10 (17%)	7–20 (26%)	5

- Ivory Coast and Belarus promoted to Group II in 1995.

=== Group III – Zone B ===
- Venue: SSI Slovan Tennis Club, Bratislava, Slovakia
- Date: 18–22 May

Rank	Team
1	Slovakia
2	Lithuania
3	Tunisia
4	Malta
5	Turkey
6	Cyprus
7	Sudan
8	Congo

- Slovakia and Lithuania promoted to Group II in 1995.
