= 2011 Dubai Tennis Championships – Men's singles qualifying =

Tennis tournament in Dubai

This article displays the qualifying draw of the 2011 Dubai Tennis Championships.

== Players ==
=== Seeds ===
1. (Germany) Tobias Kamke (qualifying competition)
2. (Germany) Mischa Zverev (first round)
3. (Bulgaria) Grigor Dimitrov (qualified)
4. (Ukraine) Illya Marchenko (first round)
5. (Italy) Simone Bolelli (first round)
6. (Slovakia) Karol Beck (qualified)
7. (Turkey) Marsel İlhan (first round)
8. (Germany) Julian Reister (first round)

=== Qualifiers ===
1. (Czech Republic) Lukáš Rosol
2. (Slovakia) Karol Beck
3. (Bulgaria) Grigor Dimitrov
4. (Ukraine) Sergei Bubka

== Qualifying draw ==
=== First qualifier ===
First round
1	(Germany) Tobias Kamke	6	6
(Czech Republic) Ivo Minář	3	2
(Czech Republic) Lukáš Rosol	6	7
7	(Turkey) Marsel İlhan	3	6^{3}

Qualifying competition
1	(Germany) Tobias Kamke	1	6	4
(Czech Republic) Lukáš Rosol	6	2	6

=== Second qualifier ===
First round
2	(Germany) Mischa Zverev	6	0	2
(Kazakhstan) Yuri Schukin	2	6	6
(France) Stéphane Robert	3	7	4
6	(Slovakia) Karol Beck	6	6^{4}	6

Qualifying competition
(Kazakhstan) Yuri Schukin	2	4
6	(Slovakia) Karol Beck	6	6

=== Third qualifier ===
First round
3	(Bulgaria) Grigor Dimitrov	6	6
WC	(United Arab Emirates) Mahmoud-Nader Al Baloushi	0	3
WC	(South Africa) Rik de Voest	7	6
8	(Germany) Julian Reister	6^{5}	2

Qualifying competition
3	(Bulgaria) Grigor Dimitrov	6	7
WC	(South Africa) Rik de Voest	1	6^{3}

=== Fourth qualifier ===
First round
4	(Ukraine) Illya Marchenko	3	5
(Italy) Paolo Lorenzi	6	7
WC	(Ukraine) Sergei Bubka	6	6
5	(Italy) Simone Bolelli	2	3

Qualifying competition
(Italy) Paolo Lorenzi	6^{1}	4
WC	(Ukraine) Sergei Bubka	7	6
