= Shibu Lal =

Bangladeshi tennis player

- Country (sports): Bangladesh
- Residence: Novato, California, U.S.
- Born: April 28, 1973 (age 52); Dhaka, Bangladesh
- Height: 5 ft 8 in (173 cm)
- Turned pro: 1987
- Plays: right handed (One handed backhand)
- Prize money: Unknown

Singles
- Career record: unknown
- Career titles: unknown
- Highest ranking: unknown

Grand Slam singles results
- Australian Open: -
- French Open: -
- Wimbledon: -
- US Open: -
- Last updated on: July 11, 2016.

Shibu Lal (Bengali: শিবু লাল; born April 28, 1973) is a Bangladeshi tennis player who has played for Bangladesh Davis Cup team. He lost to American player Daniel McCall 7–6, 6–2 in the first qualifier of the Tiburon Open, United States.
