= Oman Davis Cup team =

National tennis team

The Oman Davis Cup team represents Oman in the Davis Cup tennis competition and is governed by the Oman Tennis Association. It competed in its first Davis Cup in 1994.

Oman currently competes in the Asia/Oceania Zone of Group IV.

== Last team (2021) ==
- Ali Al Busaidi
- Isa Ali Al Suleimani
- Marwan Alkhanjari

== See also ==
- Davis Cup
- Oman Billie Jean King Cup team
