= Daniel Heryanto =

Indonesian tennis player

- Full name: Daniel Heryanto Dewandaka
- Country (sports): Indonesia; Singapore
- Born: 30 November 1969 (age 55)
- Plays: Right-handed

Singles
- Career record: 4–4 (Davis Cup)
- Highest ranking: No. 301 (15 April 1991)

Doubles
- Career record: 21–6 (Davis Cup)
- Highest ranking: No. 267 (11 March 1991)
Medal record
Representing Indonesia
Southeast Asian Games
Gold medal – first place	1989 Kuala Lumpur	Men's doubles
Bronze medal – third place	1989 Kuala Lumpur	Men's team
Asian Games
Bronze medal – third place	1990 Beijing	Men's doubles
Bronze medal – third place	1990 Beijing	Men's team

Daniel Heryanto Dewandaka (born 30 November 1969) is an Indonesian-born former professional tennis player who competed in Davis Cup tennis for both Indonesia and Singapore.

Born in 1969, Heryanto competed first for Indonesia and was a doubles gold medalist at the 1989 Southeast Asian Games in Kuala Lumpur, then the following year won two bronze medals at the 1990 Asian Games. He appeared in two Davis Cup ties for Indonesia during his career, against China in 1990 and India in 1991, for a 2/4 overall record.

Heryanto later became a permanent resident of Singapore through his time spent as national coach. Between 2003 and 2011 he featured in a total of 25 ties for the Singapore Davis Cup team primarily as a doubles player, while simultaneously serving as team captain. He won a team record 20 rubbers in doubles.

== See also ==
- List of Indonesia Davis Cup team representatives
