= United Arab Emirates Davis Cup team =

The United Arab Emirates Davis Cup team represents the United Arab Emirates in Davis Cup tennis competition and are governed by the United Arab Emirates Tennis Association.

The United Arab Emirates currently compete in the Asia/Oceania Zone of Group IV. They finished 3rd in Group III in 2002.

== History ==
The United Arab Emirates competed in its first Davis Cup in 1993.

== Current team (2022) ==
- Abdulla Al Marzouqui (Junior player)
- Abdulrahman Al Janahi
- Abdulla Almarzooqui (Junior player)
- Mahmoud-Nader Al Baloushi

== See also ==
- Davis Cup
