= Brunei Davis Cup team =

National tennis team

The Brunei Davis Cup team represents Brunei in Davis Cup tennis competition and are governed by the Brunei Darussalam Tennis Federation. They have not competed since 2008.

Their best finish is 9th in Group III in 1994.

== History ==
Brunei competed in its first Davis Cup in 1994.

== Current team (2022) ==
- Aiman Abdullah
- Billie Kee-Loong Wong (Captain-player)
- Chung Peng Lim
- Ak Ahmad Dasugi Pg Hj Sulaiman
- Gavin Yeung Kok Lim

== See also ==
- Davis Cup
- Brunei Billie Jean King Cup team
