= Mahmoud Nader Al-Baloushi =

Emirati tennis player

- Country (sports): United Arab Emirates
- Born: 30 June 1980 (age 45) Al Ain, Abu Dhabi
- Plays: Right-handed
- Prize money: $20,365

Singles
- Career record: 0-1 (ATP Tour)

Doubles
- Career record: 0-3 (ATP Tour)

Mahmoud Nader Al-Baloushi (born 30 June 1980) is an Emirati former tennis player.

Born in Al Ain, Al Baloushi was unranked on tour but made an ATP Tour singles main draw appearance at the 2008 Dubai Tennis Championships, losing his first round match to Mikhail Ledovskikh in straight sets.

Al Baloushi, who competed at the 2002 Asian Games, was a long serving member of the United Arab Emirates Davis Cup team, appearing in a total of 65 rubbers. He won 19 singles and 21 doubles rubbers in the Davis Cup.
