= Jordan Davis Cup team =

National tennis team

The Jordan Davis Cup team represents Jordan in Davis Cup tennis competition and are governed by the Jordan Tennis Federation.

Jordan currently compete in the Asia/Oceania Zone of Group IV. They competed in Group II from 1989 to 1993, but failed advance beyond the first round.

== History ==
Jordan competed in its first Davis Cup in 1989.

== Current team (2022) ==
- Abedallah Shelbayh
- Mohammad Alkotop (Junior player)
- Seif Adas
- Hamzeh Al-Aswad
- Mousa Alkotop

== See also ==
- Davis Cup
- Jordan Billie Jean King Cup team
