= Singapore Davis Cup team =

National sports team

The Singapore Davis Cup team represents Singapore in Davis Cup tennis competition and are governed by the Singapore Tennis Association.

Singapore currently compete in the Asia/Oceania Zone of Group III. They have reached the semifinals of Group II in 1988.

Daniel Heryanto is currently the most successful player for Singapore in this competition with a 21-4 win-lose ratio.

== History ==
Singapore competed in its first Davis Cup in 1984.

== Current team (2022) ==
- Roy Hobbs

- Shaheed Alam

- Ethan Lye

- Michael Jimenez

Captain : Daniel Heryanto

== Davis Cup 2015 ==
Team Singapore emerged victorious in the Davis Cup Asia/Oceania Zone of Group IV held in Bahrain. By being unbeaten, they have achieved qualification in the Davis Cup Asia/Oceania Zone of Group III in 2016

== See also ==
- Davis Cup
- Singapore Billie Jean King Cup team
