= Bangladesh Davis Cup team =

National sports team

The Bangladesh Davis Cup team represents Bangladesh in Davis Cup tennis competition and are governed by the Bangladesh Tennis Federation.

Bangladesh currently competes in the Asia/Oceania Zone of Group IV.

In the 2022 Davis Cup Asia/Oceania Zone Group IV, Bangladesh lost both matches 3–0, against Sri Lanka and Kyrgyzstan and finished last in their group.

== History ==
Bangladesh made its Davis Cup debut in 1986. They reached the semi-finals three years later, in the 1989 Davis Cup, held in Singapore. Bangladesh hosted the 1998 Davis Cup in Dhaka, where eight countries participated including Bangladesh, Bahrain, Iraq, Pacific Oceania, and Brunei. The Bangladesh team were runners-up in the group level. The youngest player to play in Davis Cup is from Bangladesh and his name is Mohammed-Akhtar Hossain. He was 13 years and 326 days when he played Myanmar in 2003. Bangladesh played in Asia/Oceania Zone Group III in the Davis Cup 2012. but was relegated to Group IV the following year. They have remained in this group since then.

In 2024, Bangladesh competed in the Asia/Oceania Zone Group V tournament in Bahrain, where they secured a 2–1 victory against Yemen. They returned to Isa Town, Bahrain, for the November 2025 Group V tournament, fielding a roster that included Zarif Abrar, Zubin Omar, Mohammad Rustom Ali, and MD Imon. During the round-robin stage of the 2025 event, the team earned a 3–0 win over Brunei, but suffered defeats against both Turkmenistan and the host nation, Bahrain.

== Current team ==
The 2022 Davis Cup team consists of:

- Md Juel Rana
- Md Kawsar Ali
- Md Rubel Hossain
- Ranjan Ram

== See also ==
- Davis Cup
- Bangladesh Billie Jean King Cup team
