= Ramna Park =

Urban green space in Dhaka

- রমনা পার্ক
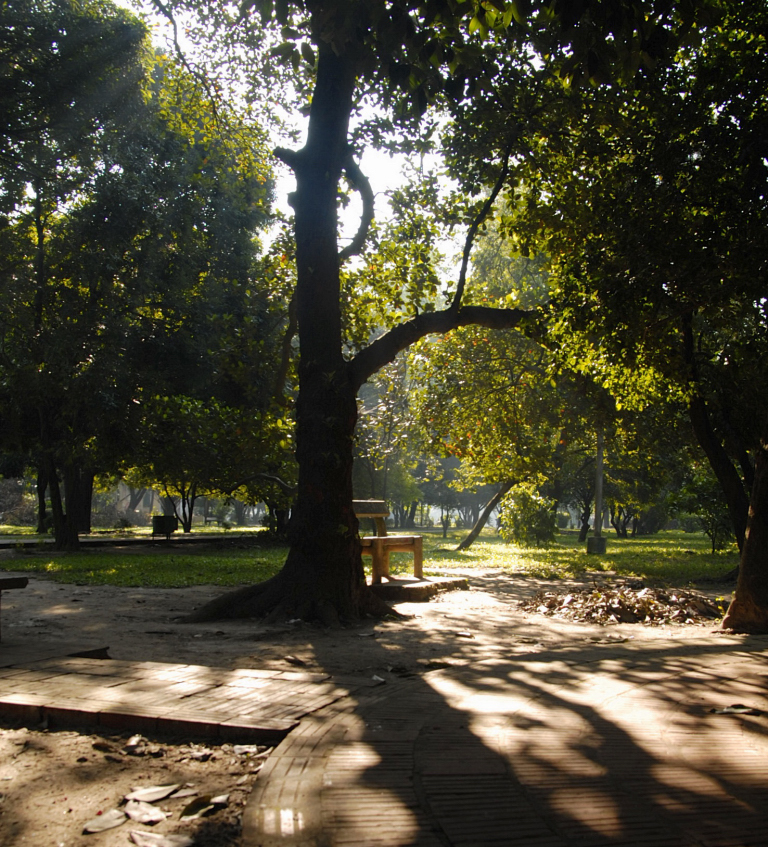
- Large old trees of Ramna Park
- Interactive map of Ramna Park
- Type: Park
- Location: Ramna, Dhaka, Bangladesh
- Coordinates: 23.738°N 90.401°E
- Area: 68.5 acres (0.277 km^{2})
- Operator: Dhaka South City Corporation
- Status: Open all year
- Parking: Yes
- Public transit: Dhaka Metro, MRT Line 6 Shahbag metro station (near the Dhaka Club, Bangladesh Tennis Federation and Shahid Zia Shishu Park gate) MRT Line 6 Bangladesh Secretariat metro station (near Segunbagicha and Bangladesh High Court sections)

Ramna Park (Bengali: রমনা পার্ক, romanized: Rômnā Pārk, or Bengali: রমনা উদ্যান, romanized: Rômnā Udyān) is an urban green space renowned for its historical significance and recreational amenities, situated at the centre of Dhaka, Bangladesh. Described as the "lungs of Dhaka City", the 68.50-acre (277,200 m^{2}) park was built during the British colonial era with a lake at its core, undergoing several transformations over the years and evolving into a popular public space. Ramna Park hosts cultural events and festivals, notably, the yearly Bengali New Year celebrations.

== History ==
=== Background ===
Before the early 20th century, the present-day site of Ramna Park comprised a vast empty expanse known as Ramna Plains. Situated in its midst was a sizable lake, while nearby stood a racecourse in Suhrawardy Udyan, both built by Dhaka's magistrate Charles Dawes.

=== Construction and inauguration ===
In 1908, R.L. Proudlock from Kew Botanical Gardens in London was tasked with landscaping and developing Ramna. The park exists today due to his planning, which included trees, flowering plants, gardens, and water features. The construction work of the main park spanned 20 years. Initially, a zoo was located in the bordering Segunbagicha area—established by the Nawabs of Dhaka—before being relocated to Mirpur.

Ramna Park was formally inaugurated in 1949, covering an area of 88.5 acres (358,000 m^{2}). The expansive open spaces served as venues for fairs and exhibitions. Notably, in 1961, Queen Elizabeth II received a warm civic reception at Ramna Park during her visit to Dhaka.

=== Developments ===
The current layout of Ramna Park was conceptualised in 1952 by the Public Works Department of Bangladesh (formerly known as the C&B Department). Enhancements to the park included deepening and extending the lake, constructing walkways and garden paths in stages, regrading and replanting sections, and implementing irrigation systems for the diverse range of tree saplings. To facilitate deep root growth, tree wells with deep vertical tubes or watering pipes were installed. Additionally, a bud-shaped water tower was erected on the park's northern side to supply water to these facilities.

In 2020, Ramna Park was closed to the public as a precautionary measure to mitigate the spread of the Coronavirus pandemic. During this period of closure, a beautification drive were undertaken by the Public Works Department at a cost of ৳460 million (US$3.7 million), which involved the construction of a new wooden deck around the re-excavated lake, new lighting systems, and rebuilding of paths covered with red ceramic bricks and bituminous carpet. Additionally, a new cafe has been built and a corner of the park has been dedicated to children's play area, while new flowers have been planted as part of the renovation work. The park was reopened towards the end of 2022.

=== Incidents ===
On 14 April 2001, during the Pohela Boishakh celebrations of the Bangla New Year, two bombs exploded at Ramna Park, resulting in the deaths of 10 individuals and injuries to several others. Subsequently, members of the Islamist group Harkat-ul-Jihad al-Islami were convicted in connection with the incident.

== Geography ==
Ramna Park is situated at the centre of Dhaka and presently covers an area of 68.50 acres (277,200 m^{2}), of which the lake covers 8.76 acres (35,500 m^{2}). Walkways inside park have been widened and five new gates built for entry from different sides.

=== Flora ===
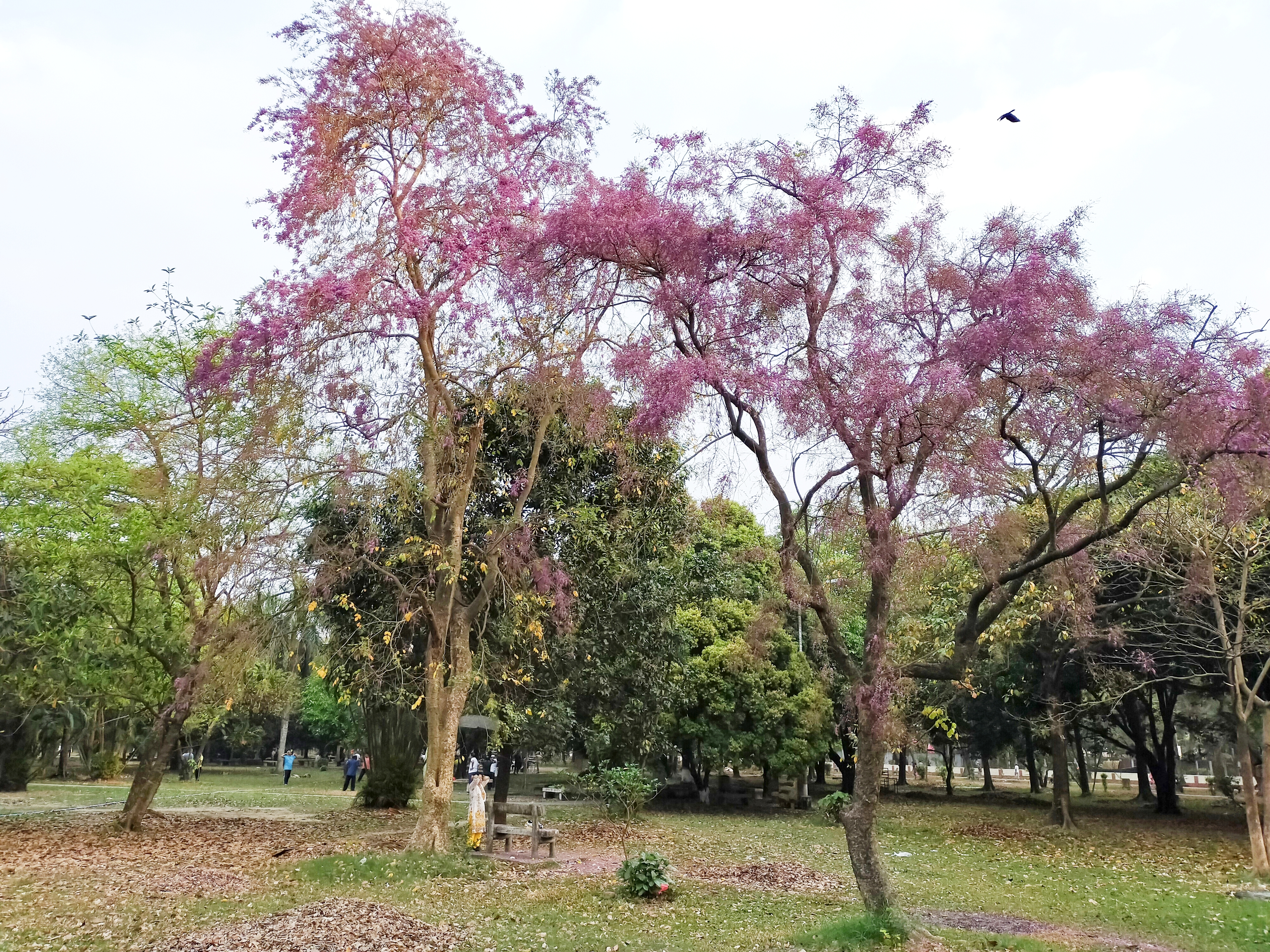
Millettia peguensis in spring

Ramna Park contains a total of 71 species of flowering plants, 36 species of fruit trees, 33 species of medicinal plants, and 41 species of forestry plants, along with an additional 11 species.

Ornamental flower plant species include J. sambac (Beli), B. acutangula (Hijol), C. fistula (Sonalu), C. pulcherrima (Radhachura), M. elengi (Bokul), M. paniculata (Kamini), P. (Kathgolap), N. arbor-tristis (Sheuli), B. ceiba (Shimul), N. cadamba (Kodom), L. speciosa (Jarul), N. arbor-tristis (Shephaly), B. monosperma (Polash), A. moniliformis (Akashmoni), M. champaca (Chapa), C. bakeriana (GolapiSonalu), C. ternatea (Aparajita), T. divaricata (Togor), I. coccinea (Rangan), P. pterocarpum (Konokchura), M. indica (Mohua), A. pavonina (Raktochandan), R. damascena (Golap), B. acuminata (Sada Kanchan), T. patula (Gada), B. glabra (Bagan Bilash), M. diplotricha (Lazzabati), A. hexapetalus (Kathalichapa), C. cristata (Morogphul), G. globosa (Botamphul), C. reflexa (Sarnalata), C. roxburghii (Lal-golapiSonalu), C. nocturnum (Hasnahena), B. purpurea (Raktakanchan), H. mutabilis (Jaba), C. variegatum (Patabahar), I. quamoclit (Gateful), C. morifolium (Chandramallika), D. metel (Dutra), G. tiliifolia (Rakta Kusum), J. auriculatum (Jui), A. dichotoma (Malatilata), J. grandiflorum (Chameli), B. variegata (Lalkanchan), J. sambac (Beli), A. leptopus (Anantalata), K. rotunda (Bhuichapa), H. coronarium (Dolon Chapa), M. indica (Mohua), M. jalapa (Sandhyamalati), P. indica (Kathchapa), M. champaca (Sharna Chapa), N. oleander (RaktaKarobi), M. grandiflora (Uday Champa), P. foetidus (Keya), B. acuminata (Sadakanchan), D. regia (Krishnochura), and M. pterocarpa (DuliChampa).

== Bengali New Year celebrations ==
The yearly celebration of Bengali New Year, known as Pohela Boishakh, kicks off at dawn with arrangements made by the cultural organisation Chhayanaut, marking the beginning of the year at the historic Ramna Batamul banyan tree located in Ramna Park, which serves as the stage for a cultural extravaganza on Pohela Boishakh. During this festivity, women adorn themselves in white sarees with red borders, while men wear traditional Panjabi attire. Traditional music and dance are performed here.

== Gallery ==
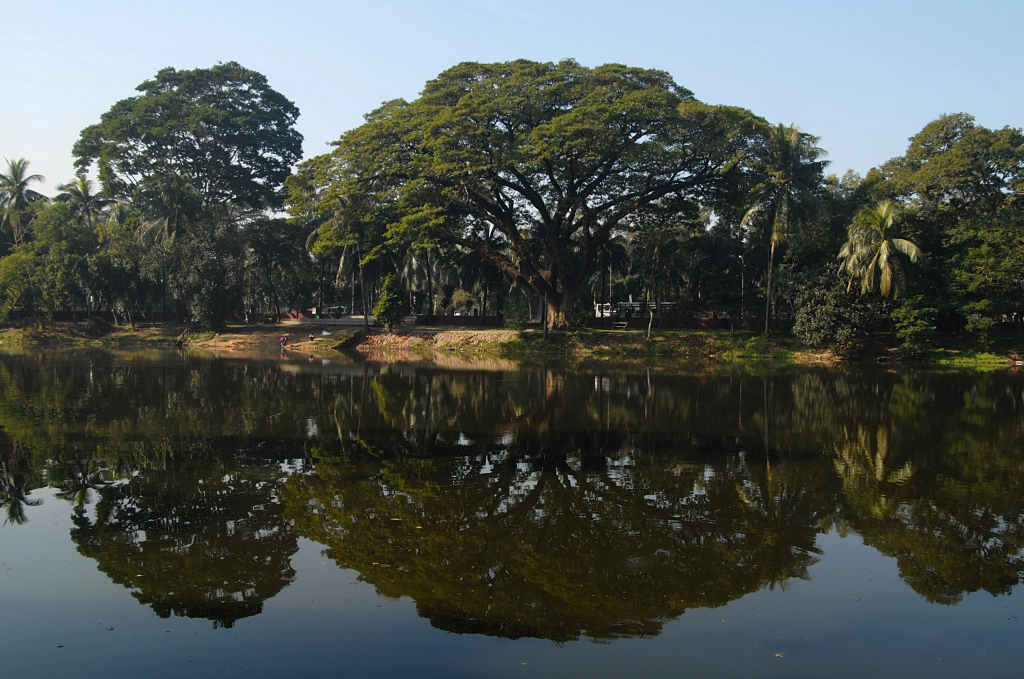
Ramna Lake shoreline

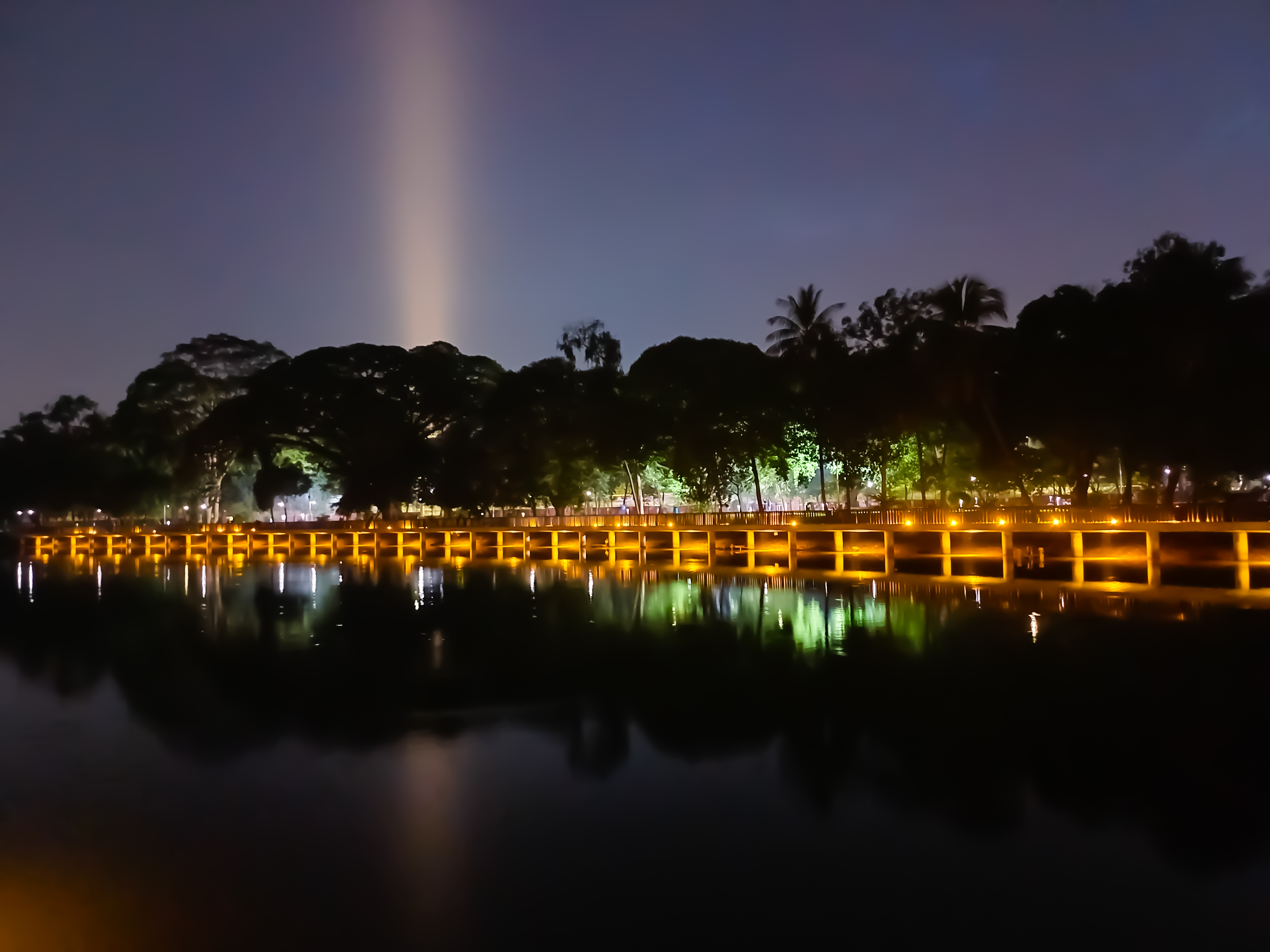
Night view

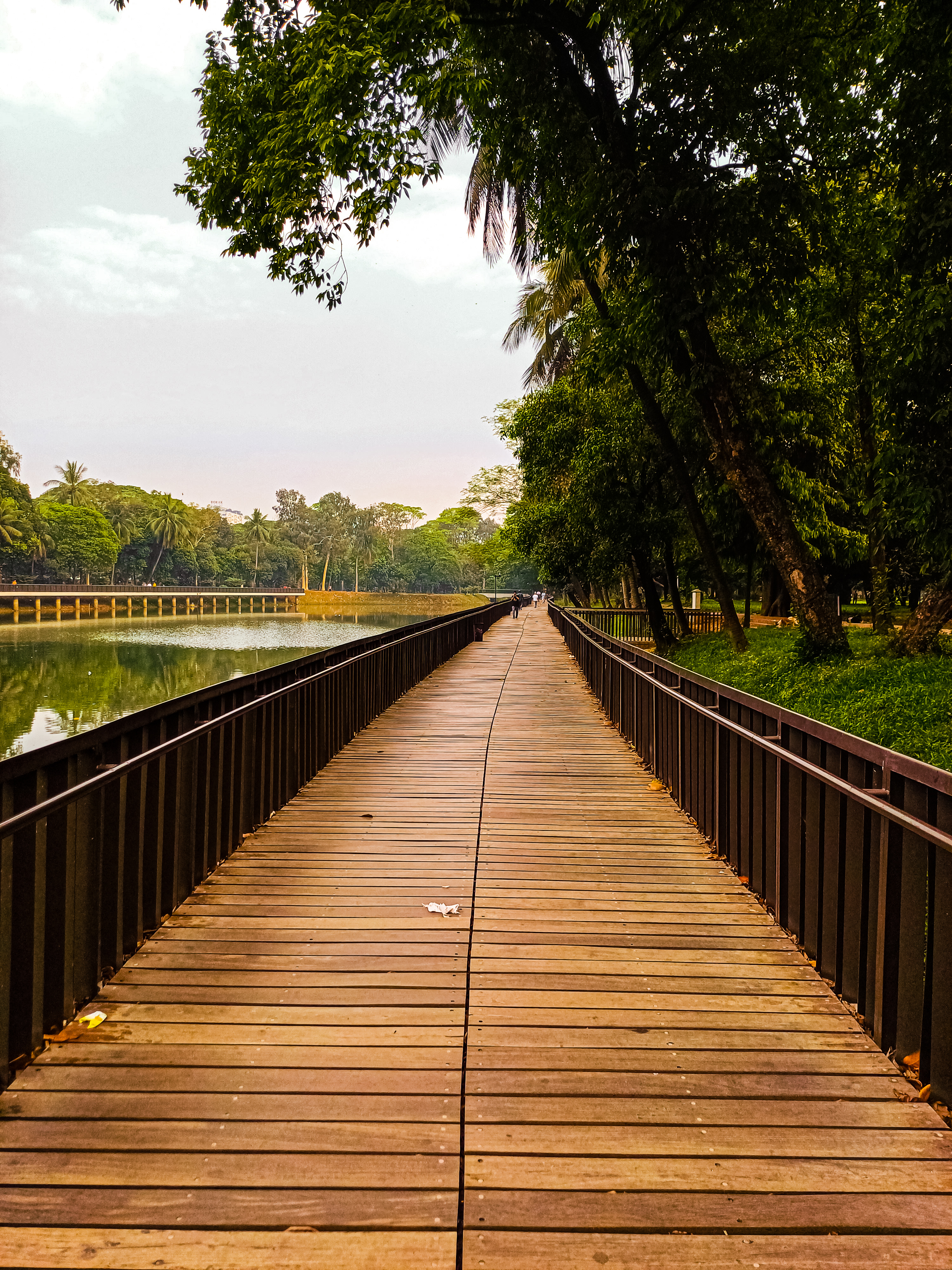
Bridge

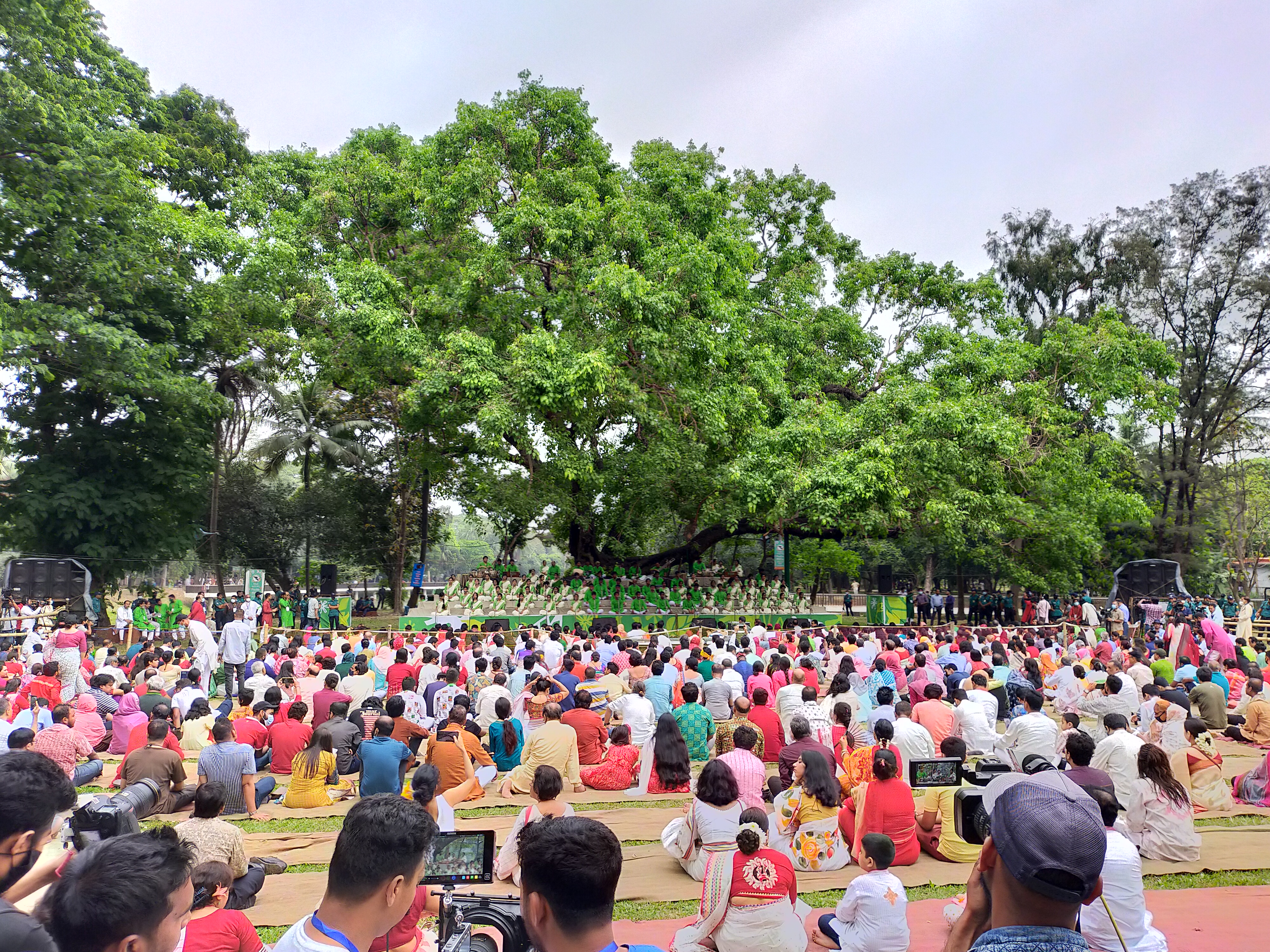
Bengali New Year 1429 celebration

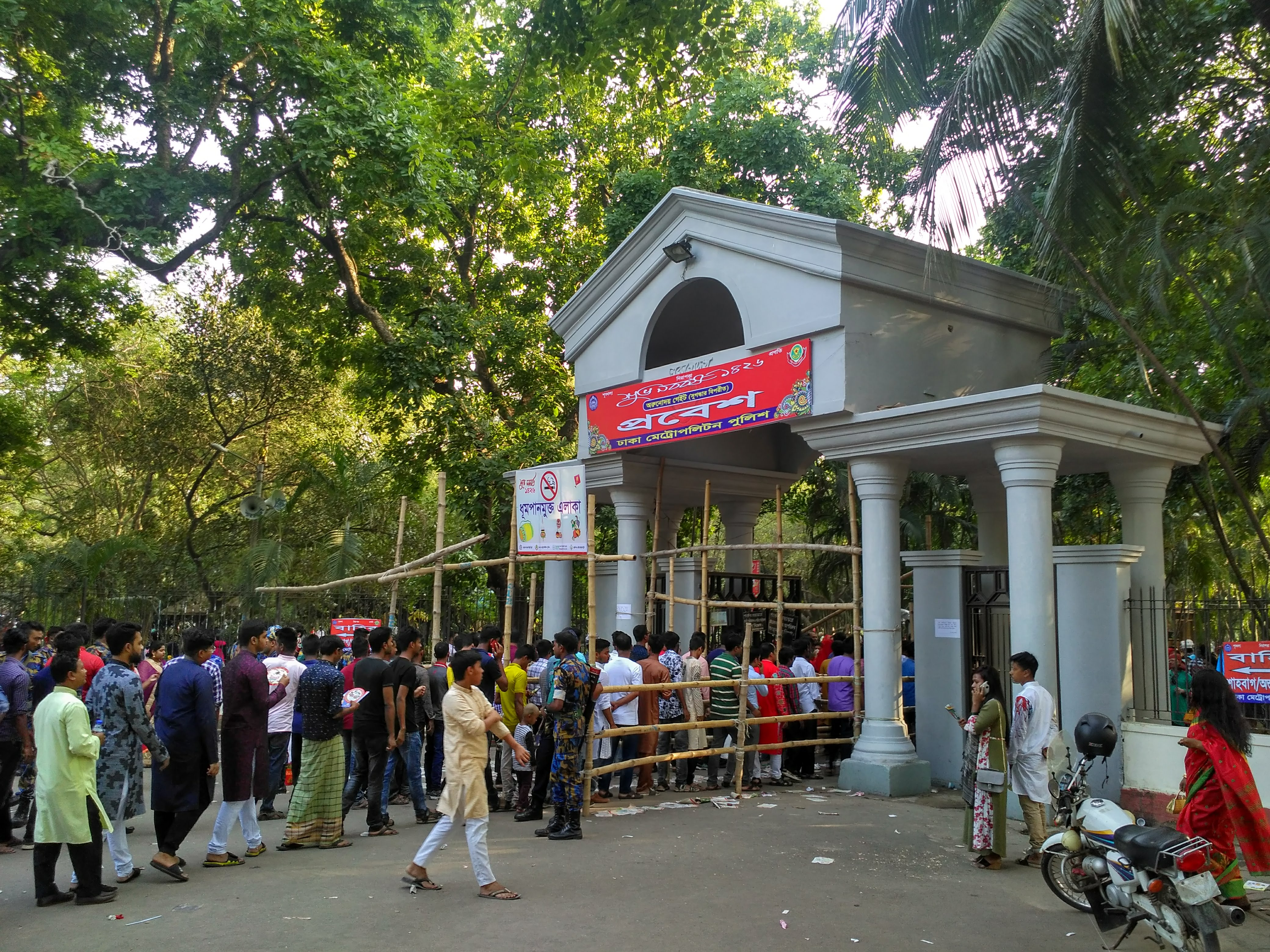
People entering for New Year celebrations

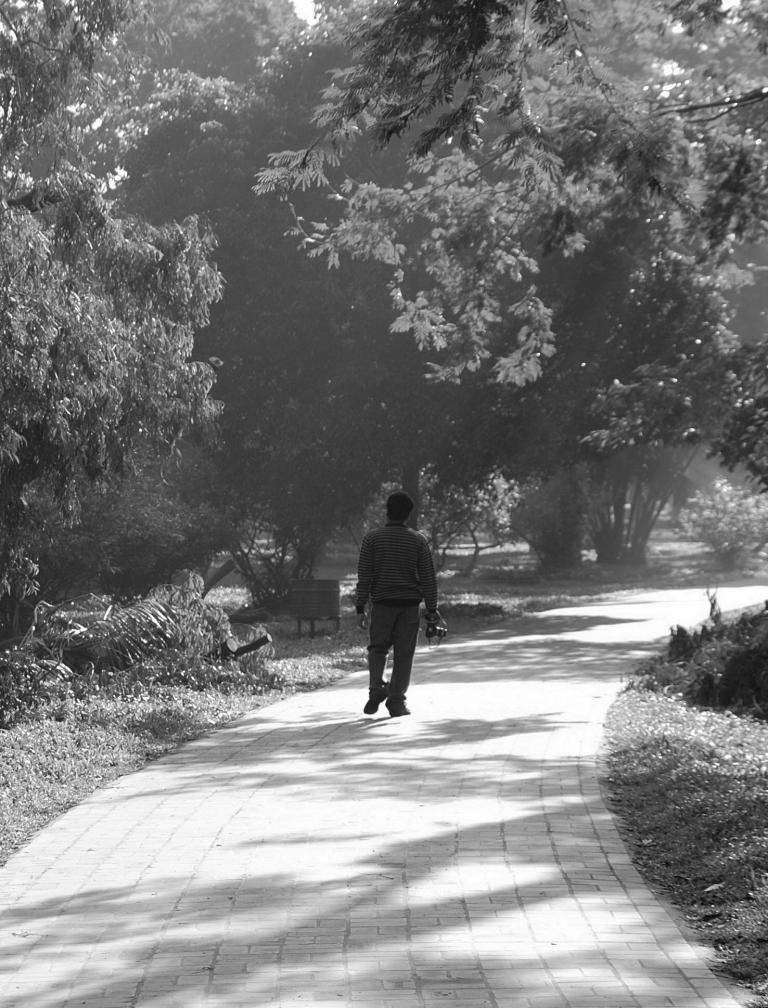
Walkway

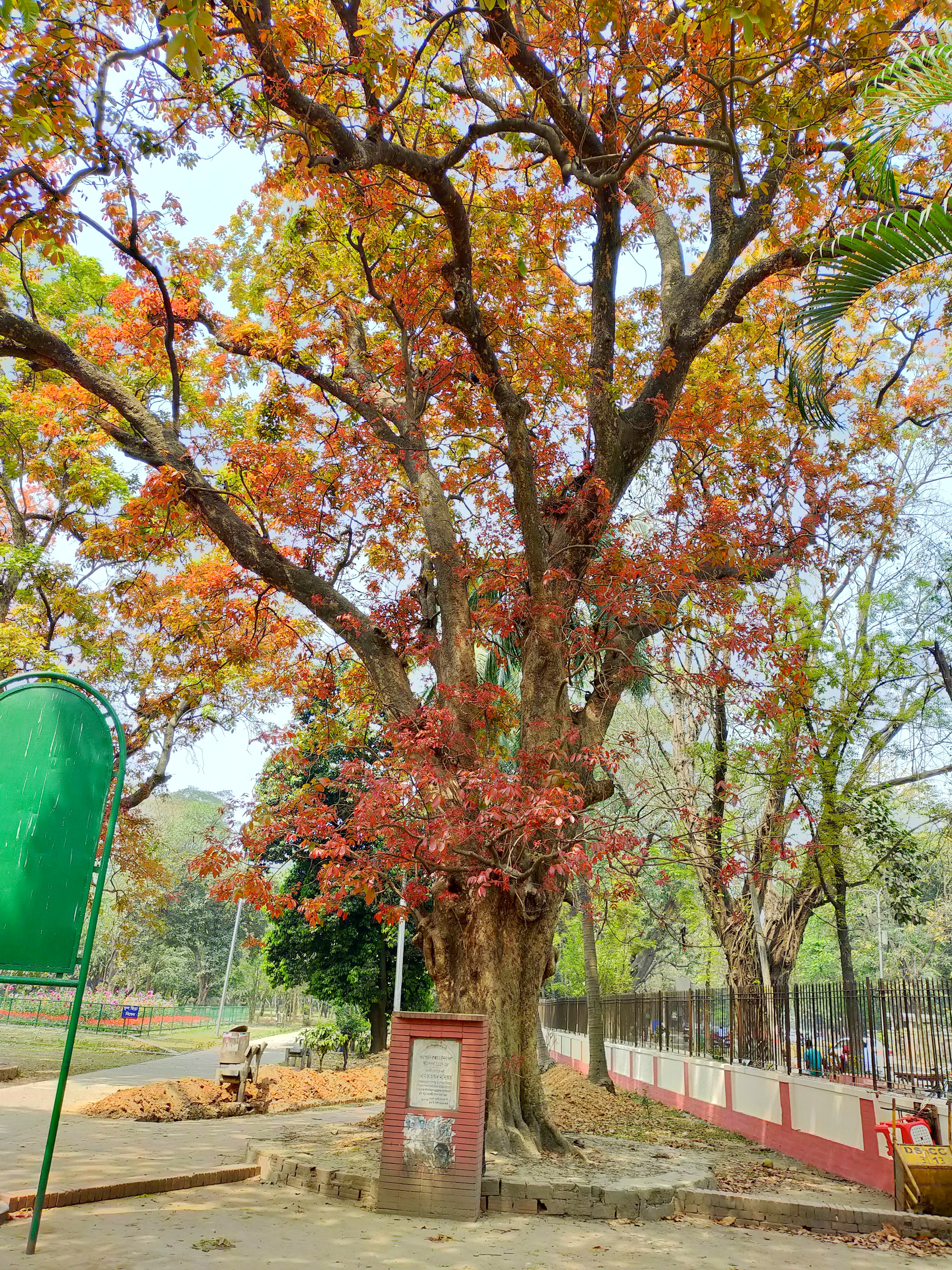
Schleichera oleosa
