= 2009 Davis Cup Asia/Oceania Zone Group IV =

International tennis competition

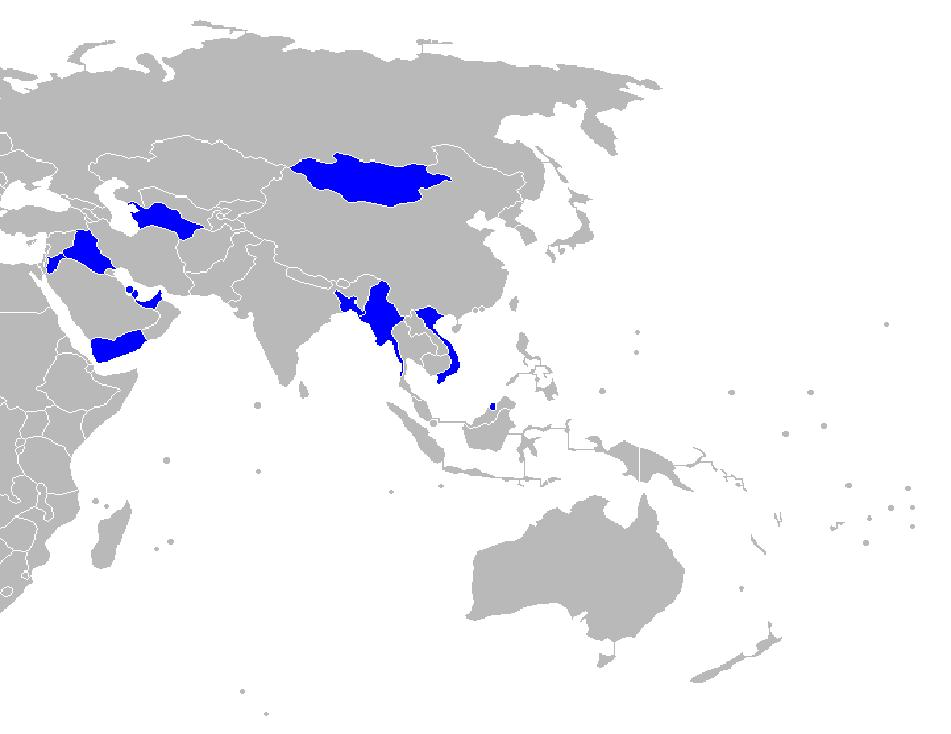
Countries participating in the 2009 Davis Cup Asia/Oceania Zone Group IV

The Asian and Oceanian Zone is one of the three zones of regional Davis Cup competition in 2009.

In the Asian and Oceanian Zone there are four different groups in which teams compete against each other to advance to the next group.

== Format ==
There will be a Round Robin where the twelve teams will compete in two pools. The winner of each pool will be promoted to the Asia and Oceania Group III in 2010.

== Information ==
Venue: Dhaka, Bangladesh

Surface: Hard – outdoors

Dates: 1–5 April

== Participating teams ==
- Bahrain
- Bangladesh
- Jordan
- Myanmar
- Qatar
- Turkmenistan
- United Arab Emirates
- Vietnam
- Yemen
- Brunei (withdrew)
- Iraq (withdrew)
- Mongolia (withdrew)

== Pool A ==
		VIE	UAE	BHR	YEM	IRQ
1	Vietnam (3–0)		2–1	3–0	3–0	
2	United Arab Emirates (2–1)	1–2		2–1	3–0	
3	Bahrain (1–2)	0–3	1–2		2–1	
4	Yemen (0–3)	0–3	0–3	1–2		
5	Iraq (withdrew)					

- Vietnam advances to Asia/Oceania Group III in 2010.

=== Matches ===
==== Bahrain vs. Vietnam ====
Bahrain
0
National Tennis Complex, Dhaka, Bangladesh
1 April 2009
hard (outdoors)

Vietnam
3

			1	2	3
1	(Bahrain) (Vietnam)	Khaled AL Thawadi; Ngô Quang Huy	2; 6	2; 6
2	(Bahrain) (Vietnam)	Abdulla Mohamed Ahmed; Bùi Trí Nguyên	2; 6	0; 6
3	(Bahrain) (Vietnam)	Khaled AL Thawadi / Abdulla Mohamed Ahmed; Lê Quốc Khánh / Trần Thanh Hoàng	2; 6	1; 6

==== Yemen vs. United Arab Emirates ====
Yemen
0
National Tennis Complex, Dhaka, Bangladesh
1 April 2009
hard (outdoors)

United Arab Emirates
3

			1	2	3
1	(Yemen) (United Arab Emirates)	Mohammed Saif; Mahmoud Nader Al-Baloushi	1; 6	1; 6
2	(Yemen) (United Arab Emirates)	Momen Hasan; Hamad Abbas Janahi	2; 6	1; 6
3	(Yemen) (United Arab Emirates)	Mohammed Saif / Fahd Thabit; Rashed Al Falasi / Faisal Bastaki	0; 6	0; 6

==== Bahrain vs. United Arab Emirates ====
Bahrain
1
National Tennis Complex, Dhaka, Bangladesh
2 April 2009
hard (outdoors)

United Arab Emirates
2

			1	2	3
1	(Bahrain) (United Arab Emirates)	Khaled Al Thawadi; Faisal Bastaki	6; 1	6; 0
2	(Bahrain) (United Arab Emirates)	Abdulla Mohamed Ahmed; Hamad Abbas Janahi	1; 6	4; 6
3	(Bahrain) (United Arab Emirates)	Esam Abdulaal / Khaled Al Thawadi; Mahmoud Nader Al-Baloushi / Hamad Abbas Janahi	6; 1	2; 6	4; 6

==== Bahrain vs. Yemen ====
Bahrain
2
National Tennis Complex, Dhaka, Bangladesh
3 April 2009
hard (outdoors)

Yemen
1

			1	2	3
1	(Bahrain) (Yemen)	Khaled Al Thawadi; Momen Hasan	6; 2	6; 1
2	(Bahrain) (Yemen)	Abdulla Mohamed Ahmed; Mohammed Saif	6; 1	4; 6	0; 4
3	(Bahrain) (Yemen)	Esam Abdulaal / Khaled Al Thawadi; Mohammed Saif / Fahd Thabit	6; 0	6; 0

==== Yemen vs. Vietnam ====
Yemen
0
National Tennis Complex, Dhaka, Bangladesh
4 April 2009
hard (outdoors)

Vietnam
3

			1	2	3
1	(Yemen) (Vietnam)	Momen Hasan; Ngô Quang Huy	0; 6	1; 6
2	(Yemen) (Vietnam)	Mohammed Saif; Bùi Trí Nguyên	2; 6	0; 6
3	(Yemen) (Vietnam)	Mohammed Saif / Fahd Thabit; Lê Quốc Khánh / Trần Thanh Hoàng	1; 6	1; 6

==== United Arab Emirates vs. Vietnam ====
United Arab Emirates
1
National Tennis Complex, Dhaka, Bangladesh
3 April 2009
hard (outdoors)

Vietnam
2

			1	2	3
1	(United Arab Emirates) (Vietnam)	Mahmoud Nader Al-Baloushi; Ngô Quang Huy	4; 6	6; 7
2	(United Arab Emirates) (Vietnam)	Hamad Abbas Janahi; Bùi Trí Nguyên	6; 2	6; 4
3	(United Arab Emirates) (Vietnam)	Mahmoud Nader Al-Baloushi / Hamad Abbas Janahi; Lê Quốc Khánh / Trần Thanh Hoàng	0; 6	6; 7

== Pool B ==
		BAN	JOR	QAT	MYA	TKM
1	Bangladesh (4–0)		2–1	3–0	2–1	3–0
2	Jordan (3–1)	1–2		3–0	2–1	3–0
3	Qatar (2–2)	0–3	0–3		2–1	3–0
4	Myanmar (1–3)	1–2	1–2	1–2		3–0
5	Turkmenistan (0–4)	0–3	0–3	0–3	0–3	

- Bangladesh advances to Asia/Oceania Group III in 2010

=== Matches ===
==== Bangladesh vs. Jordan ====
Bangladesh
2
National Tennis Complex, Dhaka, Bangladesh
1 April 2009
hard (outdoors)

Jordan
1

			1	2	3
1	(Bangladesh) (Jordan)	Shibu Lal; Khaled Naffa	6; 4	7; 6
2	(Bangladesh) (Jordan)	Sree-Amol Roy; Ahmed Al Hadid	7; 6	6; 1
3	(Bangladesh) (Jordan)	Ranjan Ram / Omar-Faruk Sunny; Fabio Badra / Tareq Talal Shkakwa	6; 2	3; 6	6; 7

==== Qatar vs. Myanmar ====
Qatar
2
National Tennis Complex, Dhaka, Bangladesh
1 April 2009
hard (outdoors)

Myanmar
1

			1	2	3
1	(Qatar) (Myanmar)	Abdulla Al-Haji; Min Min	6; 2	6; 2
2	(Qatar) (Myanmar)	Sultan Khalfan Al Alawi; Maung Nge Hnaung	7; 6	6; 1
3	(Qatar) (Myanmar)	Jabor Al-Mutawa / Mousa Shanan Zayed; Min Min / Maung Nge Hnaung	1; 6	3; 6

==== Bangladesh vs. Turkmenistan ====
Bangladesh
3
National Tennis Complex, Dhaka, Bangladesh
2 April 2009
hard (outdoors)

Turkmenistan
0

			1	2	3
1	(Bangladesh) (Turkmenistan)	Shibu Lal; Jamshid Ilmuradov	6; 1	6; 1
2	(Bangladesh) (Turkmenistan)	Sree-Amol Roy; Eziz Davletov	6; 2	6; 4
3	(Bangladesh) (Turkmenistan)	Shibu Lal / Ranjan Ram; Bahtiyar Atabaev / Eziz Davletov	6; 1	6; 3

==== Jordan vs. Myanmar ====
Jordan
2
National Tennis Complex, Dhaka, Bangladesh
2 April 2009
hard (outdoors)

Myanmar
1

			1	2	3
1	(Jordan) (Myanmar)	Fabio Badra; Maung Nge Hnaung	6; 7	4; 6
2	(Jordan) (Myanmar)	Ahmed Al Hadid; Aung Kyaw Naing	6; 1	6; 1
3	(Jordan) (Myanmar)	Ahmed Al Hadid / Khaled Naffa; Min Min / Maung Nge Hnaung	6; 7	6; 1	6; 3

==== Turkmenistan vs. Myanmar ====
Turkmenistan
0
National Tennis Complex, Dhaka, Bangladesh
3 April 2009
hard (outdoors)

Myanmar
3

			1	2	3
1	(Turkmenistan) (Myanmar)	Jamshid Ilmuradov; Maung Nge Hnaung	0; 6	3; 6
2	(Turkmenistan) (Myanmar)	Eziz Davletov; Aung Kyaw Naing	4; 6	3; 6
3	(Turkmenistan) (Myanmar)	Ibragim Byashimov / Jamshid Ilmuradov; Min Min / Maung Nge Hnaung	2; 6	4; 6

==== Qatar vs. Jordan ====
Qatar
0
National Tennis Complex, Dhaka, Bangladesh
3 April 2009
hard (outdoors)

Jordan
3

			1	2	3
1	(Qatar) (Jordan)	Abdulla Al-Haji; Fabio Badra	6; 7	4; 6
2	(Qatar) (Jordan)	Sultan Khalfan Al Alawi; Ahmed Al Hadid	6; 2	2; 6	3; 6
3	(Qatar) (Jordan)	Jabor Al-Mutawa / Mousa Shanan Zayed; Fabio Badra / Khaled Naffa	3; 6	0; 6

==== Bangladesh vs. Qatar ====
Bangladesh
3
National Tennis Complex, Dhaka, Bangladesh
4 April 2009
hard (outdoors)

Qatar
0

			1	2	3
1	(Bangladesh) (Qatar)	Shibu Lal; Jabor Al-Mutawa	6; 0	6; 0
2	(Bangladesh) (Qatar)	Sree-Amol Roy; Abdulla Al-Haji	6; 2	7; 5
3	(Bangladesh) (Qatar)	Shibu Lal / Ranjan Ram; Jabor Al-Mutawa / Mousa Shanan Zayed	6; 0	6; 1

==== Turkmenistan vs. Jordan ====
Turkmenistan
0
National Tennis Complex, Dhaka, Bangladesh
4 April 2009
hard (outdoors)

Jordan
3

			1	2	3
1	(Turkmenistan) (Jordan)	Bahtiyar Atabaev; Fabio Badra	2; 6	6; 1	4; 6
2	(Turkmenistan) (Jordan)	Ibragim Byashimov; Ahmed Al Hadid	2; 6	0; 6
3	(Turkmenistan) (Jordan)	Eziz Davletov / Jamshid Ilmuradov; Tareq Talal Shkakwa / Khaled Naffa	2; 6	2; 6

==== Bangladesh vs. Myanmar ====
Bangladesh
2
National Tennis Complex, Dhaka, Bangladesh
5 April 2009
hard (outdoors)

Myanmar
1

			1	2	3
1	(Bangladesh) (Myanmar)	Shibu Lal; Maung Nge Hnuang	4; 6	4; 6
2	(Bangladesh) (Myanmar)	Sree-Amol Roy; Aung Kyaw Naing	6; 1	6; 3
3	(Bangladesh) (Myanmar)	Sree-Amol Roy / Ranjan Ram; Min Min / Maung Nge Hnuang	6; 1	4; 6	6; 4

==== Qatar vs. Turkmenistan ====
Qatar
3
National Tennis Complex, Dhaka, Bangladesh
5 April 2009
hard (outdoors)

Turkmenistan
0

			1	2	3
1	(Qatar) (Turkmenistan)	Sultan Khalfan Al Alawi; Bahtiyar Atabaev	6; 0	6; 0
2	(Qatar) (Turkmenistan)	Mousa Shanan Zayed; Eziz Davletov	6; 4	6; 2
3	(Qatar) (Turkmenistan)	Jabor Al-Mutawa / Mousa Shanan Zayed; Bahtiyar Atabaev / Eziz Davletov	3; 6	6; 1	6; 2
