= Hatirjheel Thana =

Thana in Dhaka

Hatirjheel Thana হাতিরঝিল থানা
- Thana
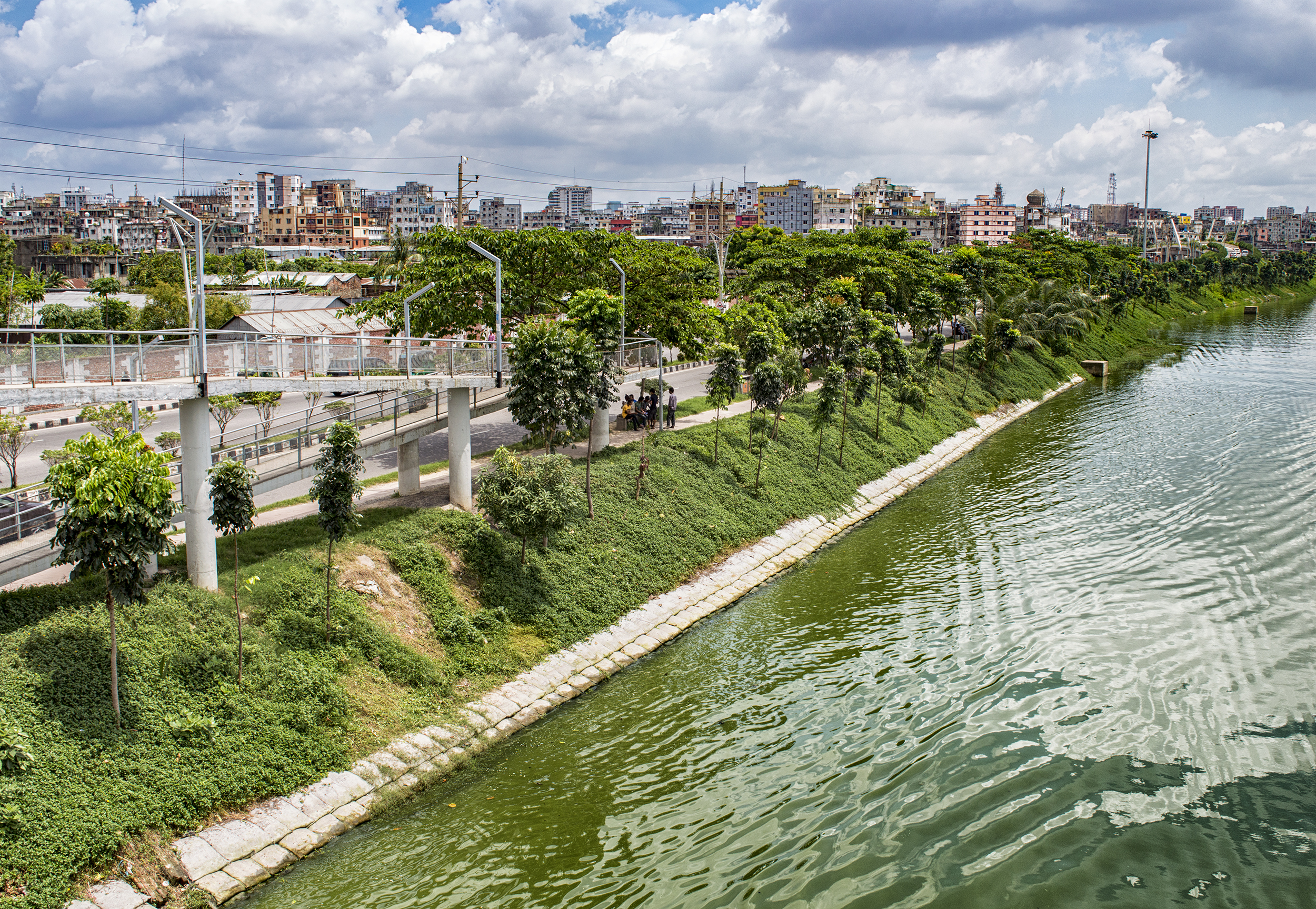
- Lakeside and skyline of Hatirjheel
- Interactive map of Hatirjheel Thana
- Location of Hatirjheel Thana within Dhaka Location of Hatirjheel Thana within Dhaka Division Location of Hatirjheel Thana within Bangladesh
- Coordinates: 23°45.6′N 90°24.7′E
- Country: Bangladesh
- Division: Dhaka Division
- District: Dhaka District
- Elevation: 23 m (75 ft)

Population (2022)
  - Total: 79,974
- Time zone: UTC+6 (BST)
- Postal code: 1219
- Area code: 02

Hatirjheel Thana is a thana in Dhaka, the capital of Bangladesh. It was formed in 2018 with the Hatirjheel project and its surrounding areas. The areas under this thana were earlier under the thanas of Ramna, Tejgaon Industrial Area and Rampura. Hatirjheel Thana is a part of Dhaka North City Corporation.

== Naming and etymology ==
Legend has it that the elephants of Dhaka's Pilkhana, Dhanmondi used to take baths in these wetlands. Hati (Bengali: হাতি) in Bengali means elephant and Jheel (Bengali: ঝিল) means lake – hence the name Hatirjheel.

== History ==
Previously, the area of Hatirjheel was overlapped by multiple thanas, namely Tejgaon I/A, Ramna, Gulshan, Badda and Rampura. During any incident, it would be confusing to identify the jurisdiction that particular area fell under. To solve this problem many people suggested establishing a thana in the area. Finally, the Hatirjheel Thana was formed as the 50th police station of Dhaka Metropolitan Police on 7 July 2018.

== Demographics ==
Religions in Hatirjheel Thana (2022)
Religion	Percent
Islam	96.09%
Hinduism	3.75%
Other or not stated	0.16%

According to the 2022 Bangladeshi census, Hatirjheel Thana had 21,617 households and a population of 79,974. 6.96% of the population were under 5 years of age. Hatirjheel had a literacy rate (age 7 and over) of 89.26%: 90.97% for males and 87.20% for females, and a sex ratio of 119.32 males for every 100 females.

== Administration ==
The thana includes the areas of Moghbazar Wireless Colony, Boro Moghbazar, West Moghbazar, Hatirjheel Project Areas, SAARC Fountain of Ward No-39, Pan Pacific Hotel Sonargaon Road, parts of Banglamotors, parts of Eskaton, New Eskaton Road, parts of Malibagh Chowdhury Para, Nayatola, North Nayatala 1st Part, North Nayatola 2nd Part, East Nayatola, South Nayatola, Dilu Road, Peyarabagh Central Peyarabagh, Greenway, BGMEA Building, Mirertek, Mirbagh, Madhubagh, Link Road Level Crossing, Begunbari Canal, Rainbow Crossing, Tejkuni Para, Shaheenbagh, Arjatpara, West Rampura, Mohanogor Project Area, Hatirjheel-Badda Link Road, Abul Hossain Road, Wapda Road, Police Plaza, Hajipara and its adjoining areas.
