= National Tennis Complex =

Sports complex in Dhaka

- জাতীয় টেনিস কমপ্লেক্স
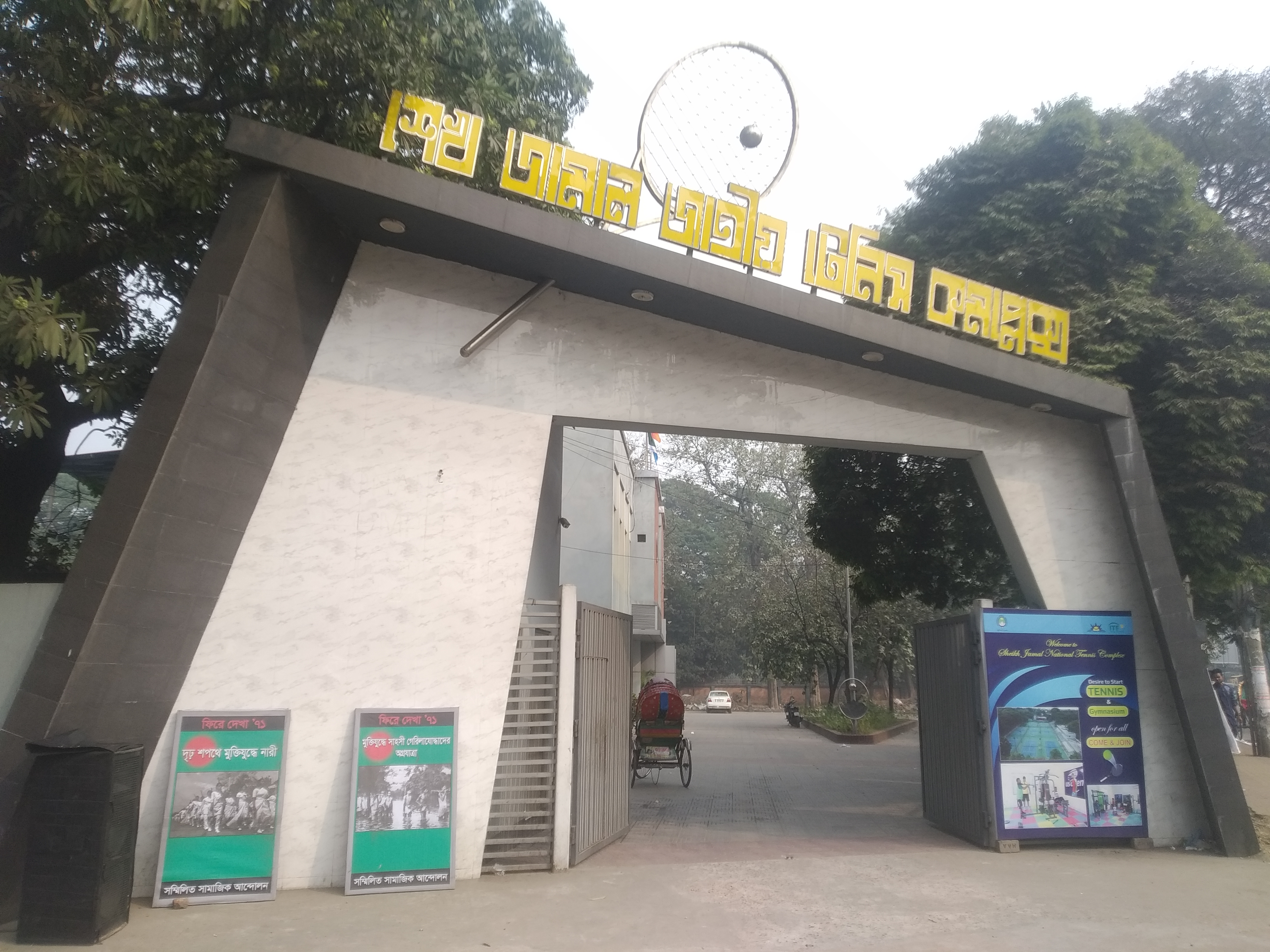
- National Tennis Complex Main Gate
- Interactive map of National Tennis Complex
- Former names: Sheikh Jamal National Tennis Complex; Ramna National Tennis Complex
- Address: Ramna; Dhaka; Bangladesh
- Coordinates: 23.7388°N 90.3987°E
- Owner: Bangladesh Tennis Federation

The National Tennis Complex is the national tennis practice ground located in Ramna, Dhaka, the capital of Bangladesh.

== History ==
The Ramna National Tennis Complex was established in 1977. The Ramna National Tennis Complex was renamed Sheikh Jamal National Tennis Complex after the middle son of Bangabandhu Sheikh Mujibur Rahman, Shaheed Lt. Sheikh Jamal. The complex was renovated in 2018 at a cost of approximately 180 million taka.

In March 2025, the Sheikh Jamal National Tennis Complex was renamed the National Tennis Complex.

== Events ==
- Independence Day Tennis Competition-2023 organized by Bangladesh Tennis Federation at Sheikh Jamal National Tennis Complex.
