= Hatirjheel =

Water body in Dhaka, Bangladesh

Hatirjheel হাতিরঝিল
- Lake
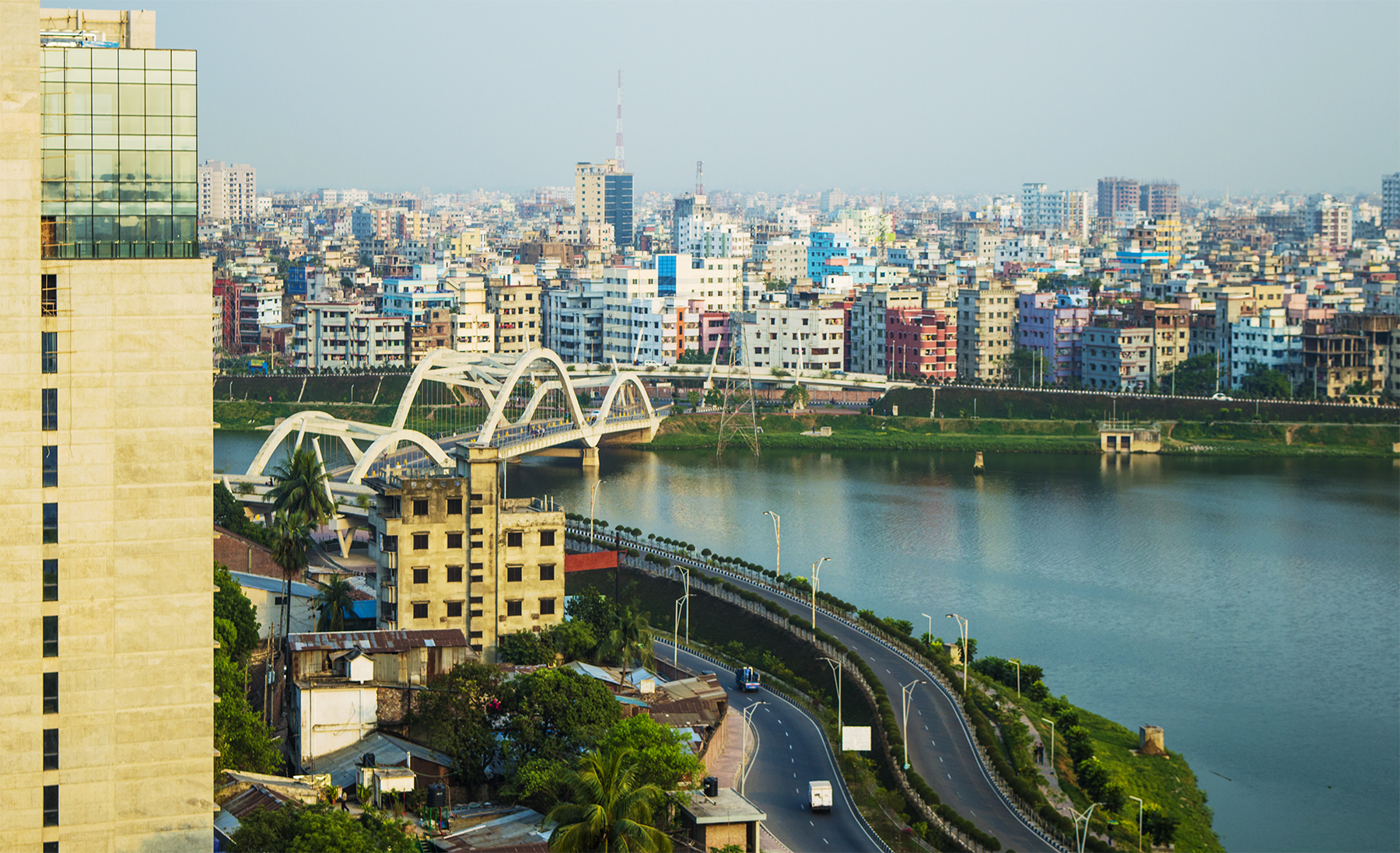
- The second bridge of Hatirjheel
- Nickname: Lake of Elephants
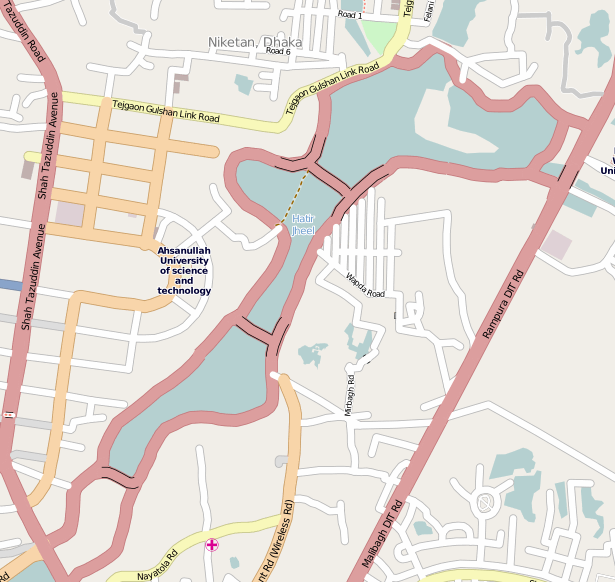
- Map of Hatirjheel and its surrounding areas
- Coordinates: 23°44′58.47″N 90°23′48.35″E
- Country: Bangladesh
- Inaugurated in: January 2, 2013

Area
  - Total: 122 ha (302 acres)

Hatirjheel (Bengali: হাতিরঝিল [ɦatir dʒʱil], English: /ˈhɑːtiːˌdʒhɪl/; lit. Lake of Elephant) is a lakefront in Dhaka, Bangladesh with surrounding roads and bridges built to ease traffic congestion.

The largest freshwater basin in Dhaka, Hatirjheel historically served as a waterway for bathing elephants during the colonial period and was later used by traders via the now-defunct Narai River. Over time, it became heavily encroached upon by illegal structures. In 2008, the government launched a development project that included the construction of roads, bridges, and a water retention area. The site was officially opened to the public in 2013 and is now a popular recreational spot for residents of Dhaka.

Despite being developed as a rainwater retention facility, Hatirjheel has failed to fulfil its intended purpose, primarily due to inadequate sewage infrastructure that has led to severe pollution from sewage runoff. In addition to environmental degradation, the area faces significant challenges related to crime and poor waste management.

== History ==
According to local tradition, the name Hatirjheel—meaning "Elephant Lake"—originates from its historical use as a bathing area for elephants from Dhaka’s Pilkhana. During the nineteenth century, the British administration and local Zamindars utilised Hatirjheel for this purpose. After the colonial period, the site became encroached upon by unauthorised structures. Architect Iqbal Habib, head of the consultancy for the Hatirjheel–Begunbari development project, noted that the Bhawal Raja kept his trained elephants at Pilkhana and that they were brought to the wetlands via Elephant Road and Hatirpool.

Hatirjheel was once hydrologically connected to the nearly-defunct Narai River, also known as the Rampura Canal. This river flowed eastward from the Rampura Bridge, bending through Banasree and Meradia before merging with the Balu River at Kayetpara. Prior to its gradual infill in the 1980s, it is reported that traders from Rupganj used this waterway to transport vegetables and goods to Karwan Bazar by boat. However, the construction of the Rampura Bridge and a sluice gate disrupted this connection, effectively cutting off Hatirjheel from the river system.

Over time, Hatirjheel, along with its canals and surrounding wetlands, deteriorated into a dumping ground for household and industrial waste. Approximately 1,200 illegal settlements had encroached on the area, including slums, real estate developments, and commercial establishments.

=== Development ===
The concept for developing Hatirjheel first emerged in 1995, aiming to address Dhaka’s traffic congestion and improve public mobility, while also preserving one of the city's key natural water retention basins and drainage channels linking old and new Dhaka. A key component was the Hatirjheel Link Road, which became a vital connector between different parts of the city.

A preliminary study conducted by BUET in 2004–2005 assessed the development potential of the area. This led to a proposal for an integrated development project covering the Hatirjheel and Begunbari Khal areas, approved by the Executive Committee of the National Economic Council (ECNEC) in 2007. Subsequently, land acquisition was undertaken by RAJUK, the Capital Development Authority, which demolished numerous unauthorised structures and evicted illegal occupants. The project, covering 302 acres (1.22 km^{2}), was later revised to a cost of ৳2236.02 crore (US$180 million). From this, ৳10.48 billion (US$85 million) was spent on land acquisition. RAJUK acquired 81 acres (0.33 km^{2}) from the Court of Wards and government-owned land. The project was initially set to be completed by June 2010.

Construction work began in February 2008 by the Special Works' Organisation (SWO) of the Bangladesh Army. The total funds for creating the project included the money of RAJUK (1,113.7 billion taka), LGED (2,760 million) and WASA (866.95 million). The project was led by architect Iqbal Habib (Team Leader), Ehsan Khan and Ishtiaque Zahir of VITTI Sthapati Brindo Ltd. Hatirjheel was officially opened to public on 2 January 2013. However, due to multiple deadline extensions, the full implementation of the Hatirjheel–Begunbari project was scheduled to continue well until 2019.

Hatirjheel Musical Dancing Fountain, the first dancing water fountain in Bangladesh

In 2014, a boundary wall was constructed around the lake, along with the construction of apartments for relocated residents. Additional features such as miniature parks and an amphitheatre were introduced by 2017. Although the project initially focused on traffic management, flood protection, and drainage improvement, it has evolved into a prominent recreational space within Dhaka.

In July 2018, Dhaka Metropolitan Police established a thana at Hatirjheel. The establishment of the thana solved its complications as it was under the jurisdiction of multiple thanas. Another initiative, the Hatirjheel Lake Water Treatment Project, was approved in 2018 with the objective of improving the lake’s water quality.

== Geography ==
Hatirjheel is located at the centre of the capital city, Dhaka. Hatirjheel is located at coordinates 23°44′58.47″N 90°23′48.35″E. Hatirjheel is located in Hatirjheel Thana. The area stretches from Sonargaon Hotel in the south to Banasree in the north. The place is surrounded by Tejgaon, Gulshan, Badda, Rampura, Banasree, Niketan, and Maghbazar, and it made the transportation of the people living near these areas much easier. During the dry season, the lake can hold approximately 3.06 billion litres of water, and during the rainy season about 4.81 billion litres of water, making it the largest body of water inside the capital of Bangladesh.

The entire area of Hatirjheel is designed with about four main and four minor bridges (viaducts), several overpasses (flyovers), footbridges (overbridges), 8.80 kilometres of footpaths, 9.80 kilometres of walkway, one children's park, and 13 viewing decks. As part of the development project, an 8.8-kilometre (5.5 mi) expressway, 9.8 kilometres (6.1 mi) of service roads, four bridges, four overpasses, three viaducts, and two U-loops were constructed to improve connectivity and traffic flow across the area.

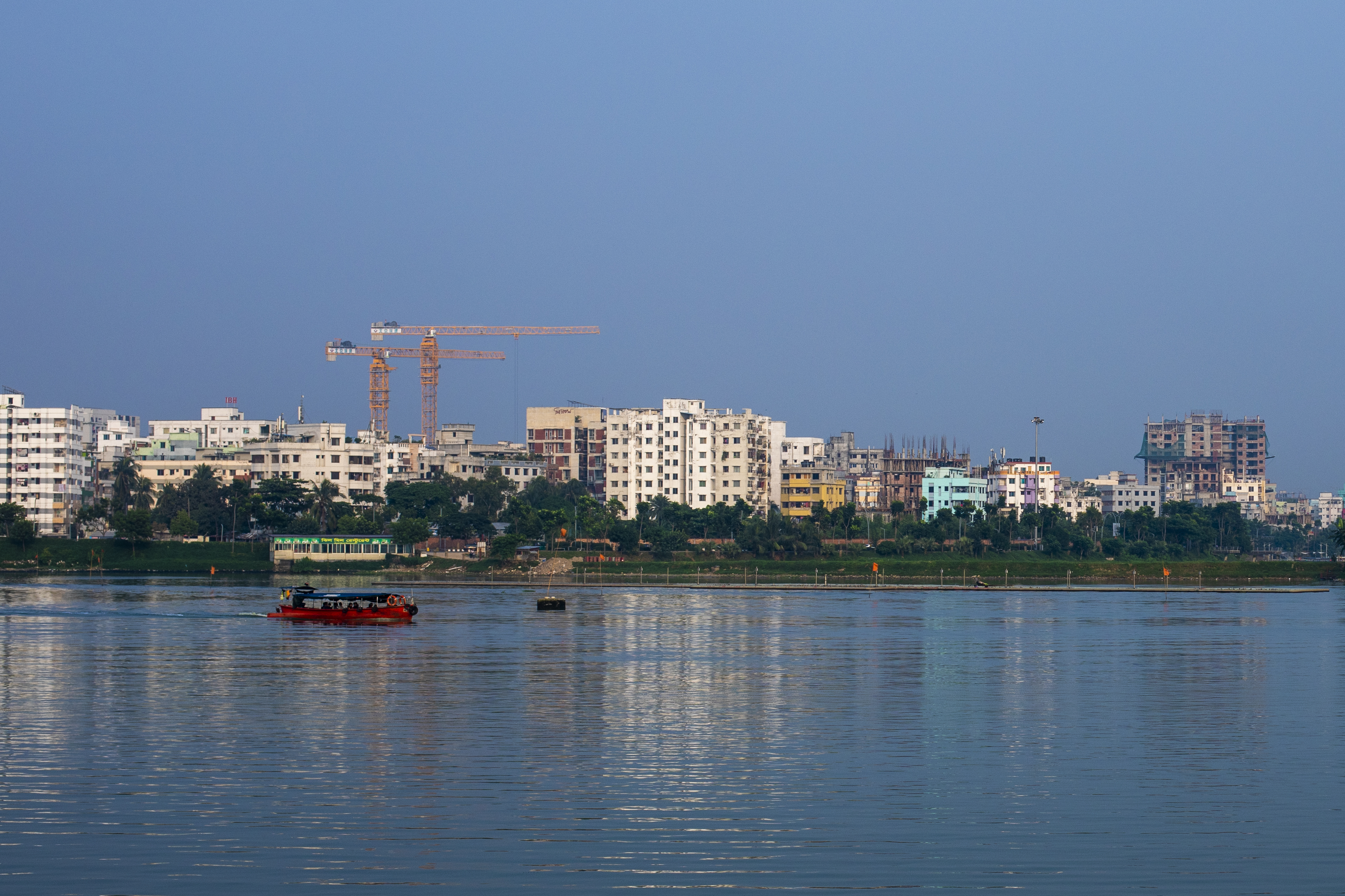
Hatirjheel, Dhaka, Bangladesh

== Facilities ==
After completion, Hatirjheel is considered by many to be one of the most notable places in Dhaka, and hence, turned into one of the most favourite recreational places for the city dwellers and tourists. Since congested buildings permeate most of Dhaka, leaving few open places for people to feel the fresh air, Hatirjheel attracts city dwellers with its abundant fresh air. Bus and water taxi services are available for transport within the area. At night, lights of different hues illuminate the entire Hatirjheel, especially on the bridges. The area has been decorated with flowering shrubs and trees. Numerous tourists and pedestrians visit the site every evening to enjoy the reflection of light and the fresh air.

In the afternoon people, especially couples, visit Hatirjheel for recreational purposes. There are restaurants and venues for small-scale family picnics. Boat rides are also available for both recreational purposes and transportation. The area has an amphitheatre with a capacity to accommodate 2,000 visitors. There is a 120-meter-long colourful musical fountain with a time-controlled sound wave and musical tracks, making it a tri-dimensional structure.

== Issues ==
=== Water pollution and environmental issues ===
Hatirjheel, originally intended as a rainwater retention facility and the largest freshwater body in the capital, has instead become heavily polluted, functioning more as a sewerage basin. In the absence of a comprehensive sewage network in several nearby areas, waste from new developments has been diverted into the stormwater drainage system. As a result, chemical treatment remains necessary to mitigate pollution in the lake. The Dhaka Water Supply and Sewerage Authority’s (DWASA) failure to extend the sewerage network has also led to the underutilisation of the Dasherkandi treatment plant.

The authorities of the Dhaka Elevated Expressway project have reportedly been found filling parts of the water body in the Eskaton area with sand, without the required approvals from relevant government bodies and in violation of existing environmental regulations.

=== Lack of maintenance and crime ===
Household and commercial waste is overflowing in various parts of the project area. Grills of drains built along the walkways have been removed, and open defecation has been observed in several locations around the lake. Poor lighting around the site further contributes to its vulnerability, with the area reportedly remaining a hotspot for criminal activities such as mugging, drug peddling, and sexual harassment—issues largely attributed to inadequate security measures, according to local residents. While the Bangladesh Army was initially responsible for its maintenance, it was taken over by RAJUK in 2021.

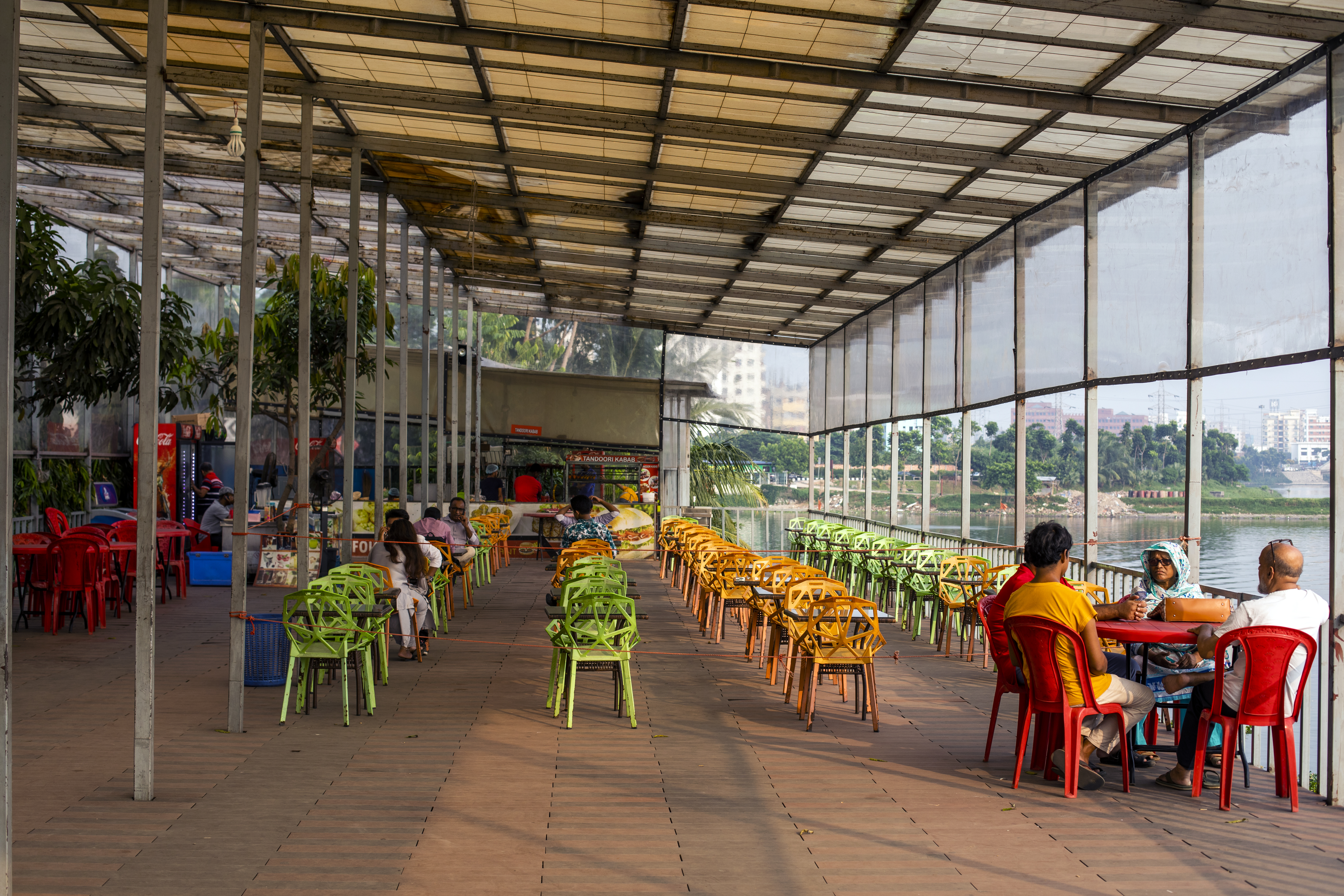
Cafe, Hatirjheel Lake, Dhaka, Bangladesh

== Gallery ==
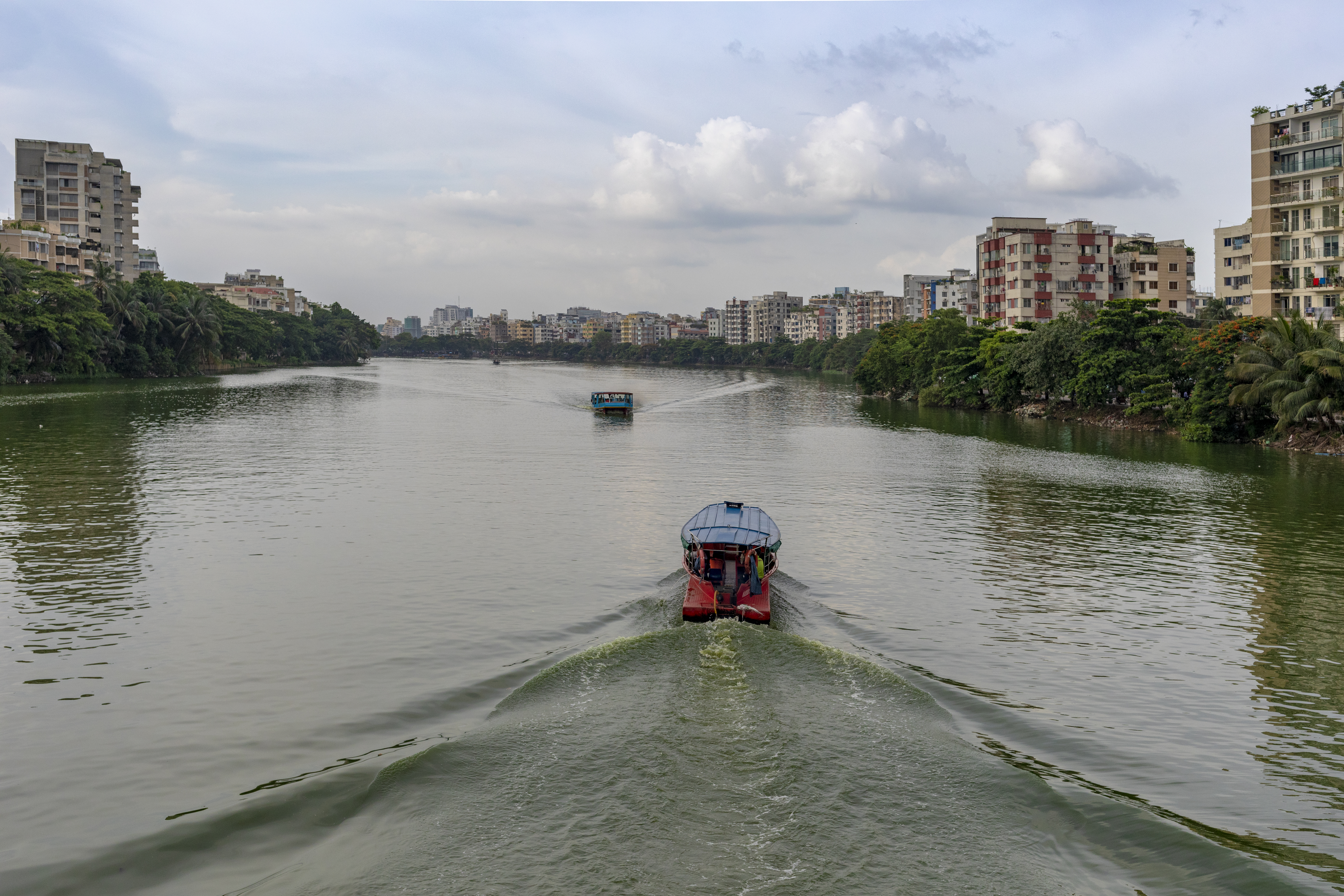
Hatirjheel

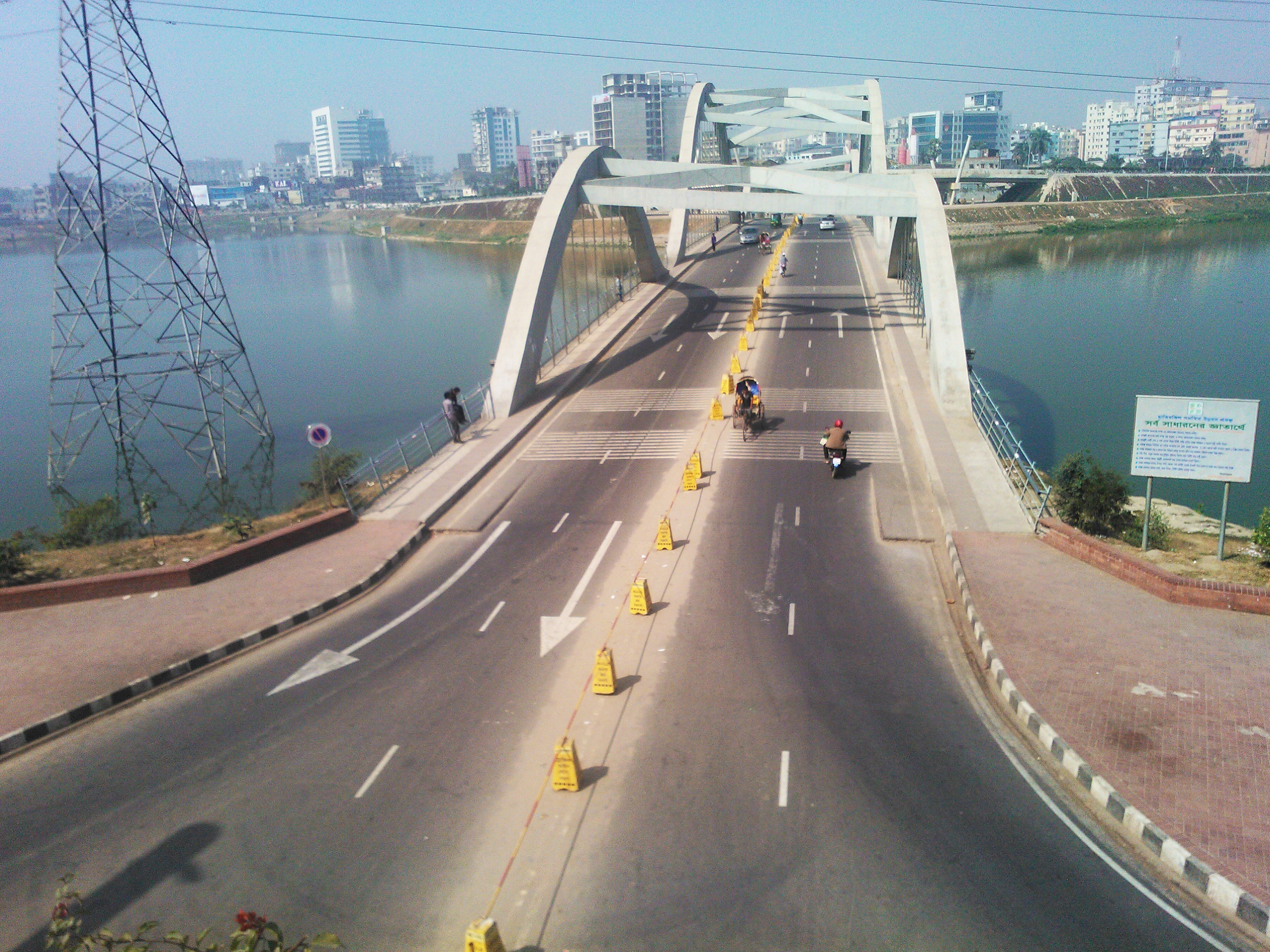
Hatirjheel, second bridge

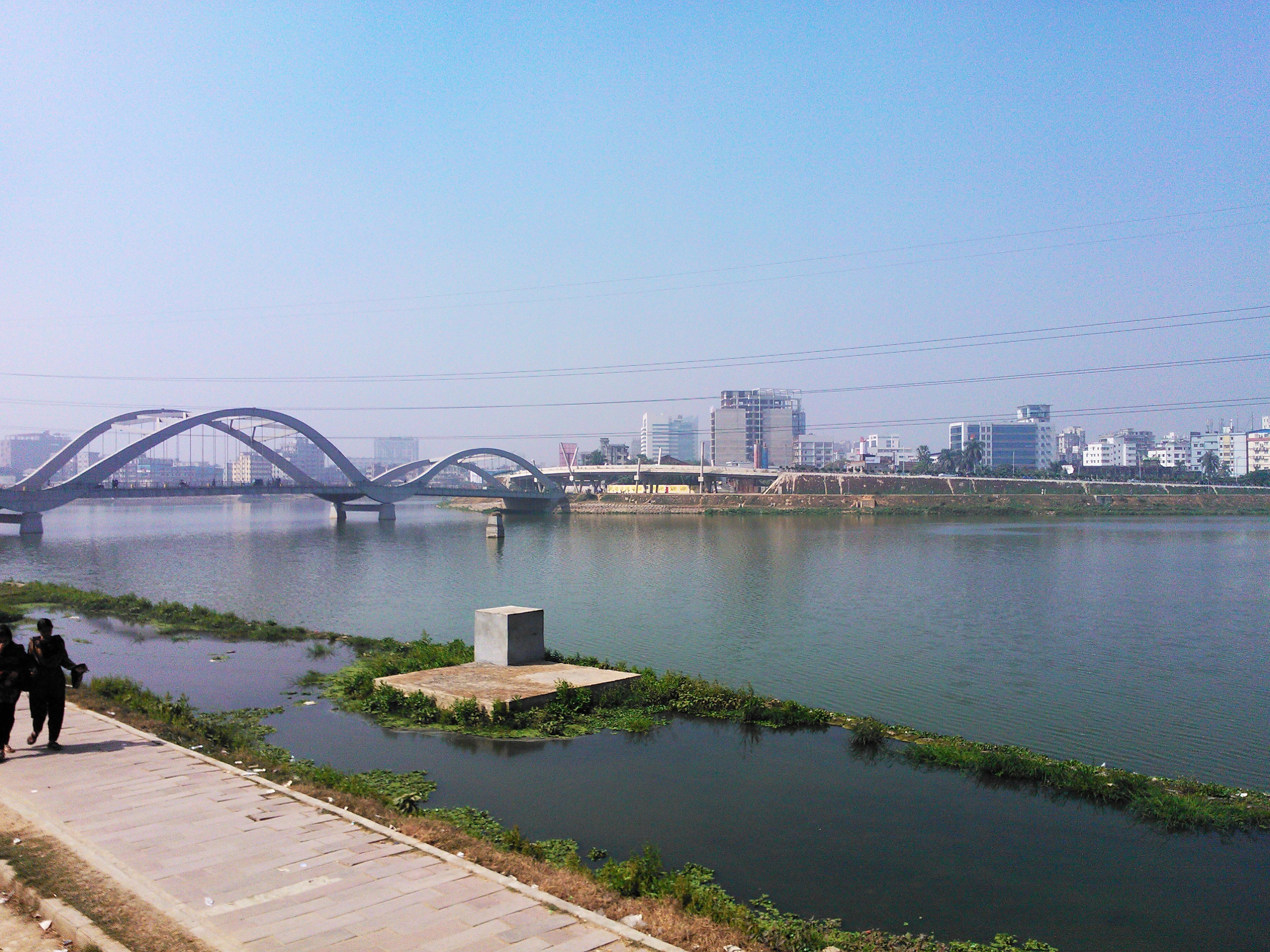
Hatirjheel, second bridge

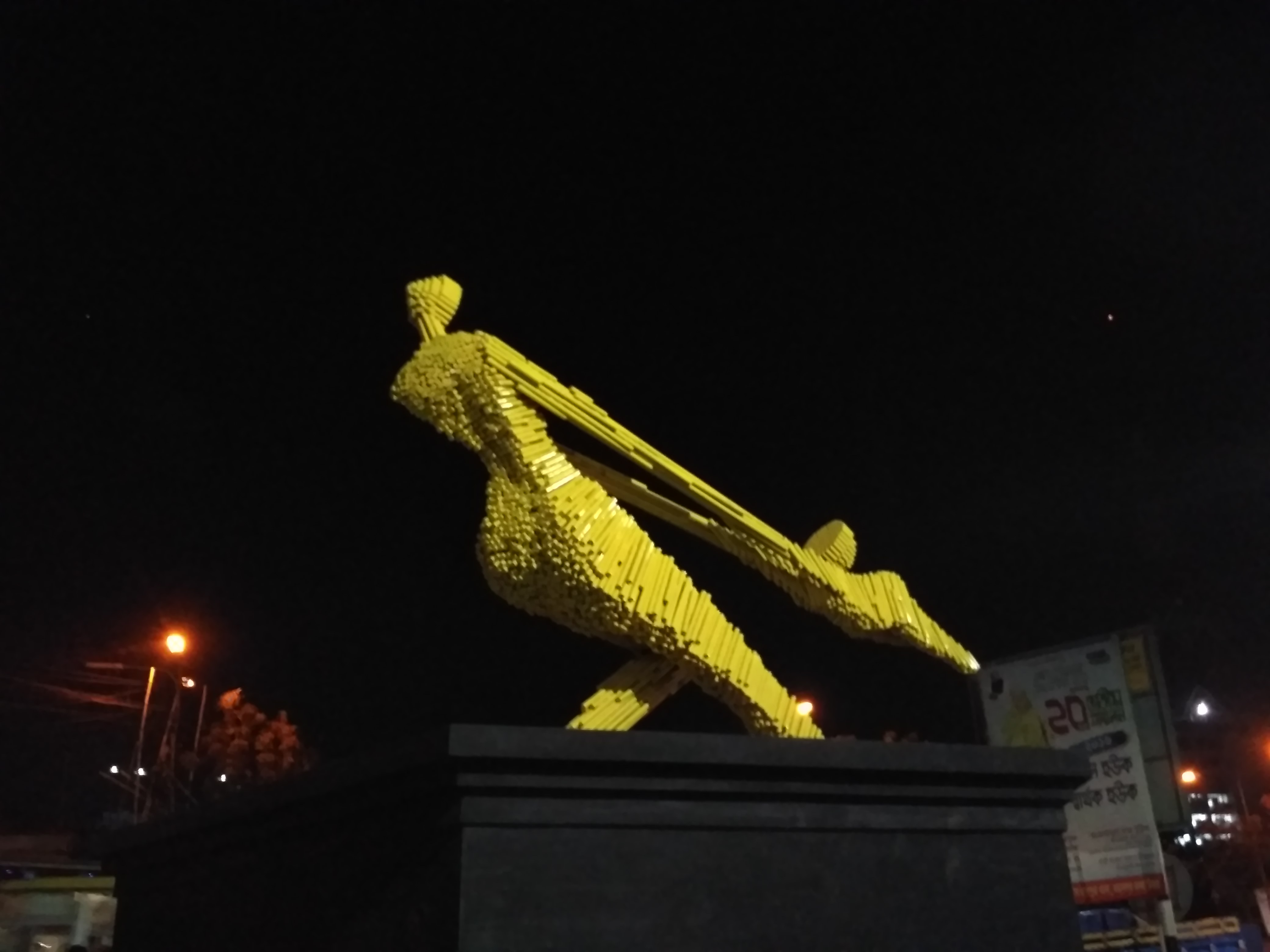
The Joy of Mother Statue
