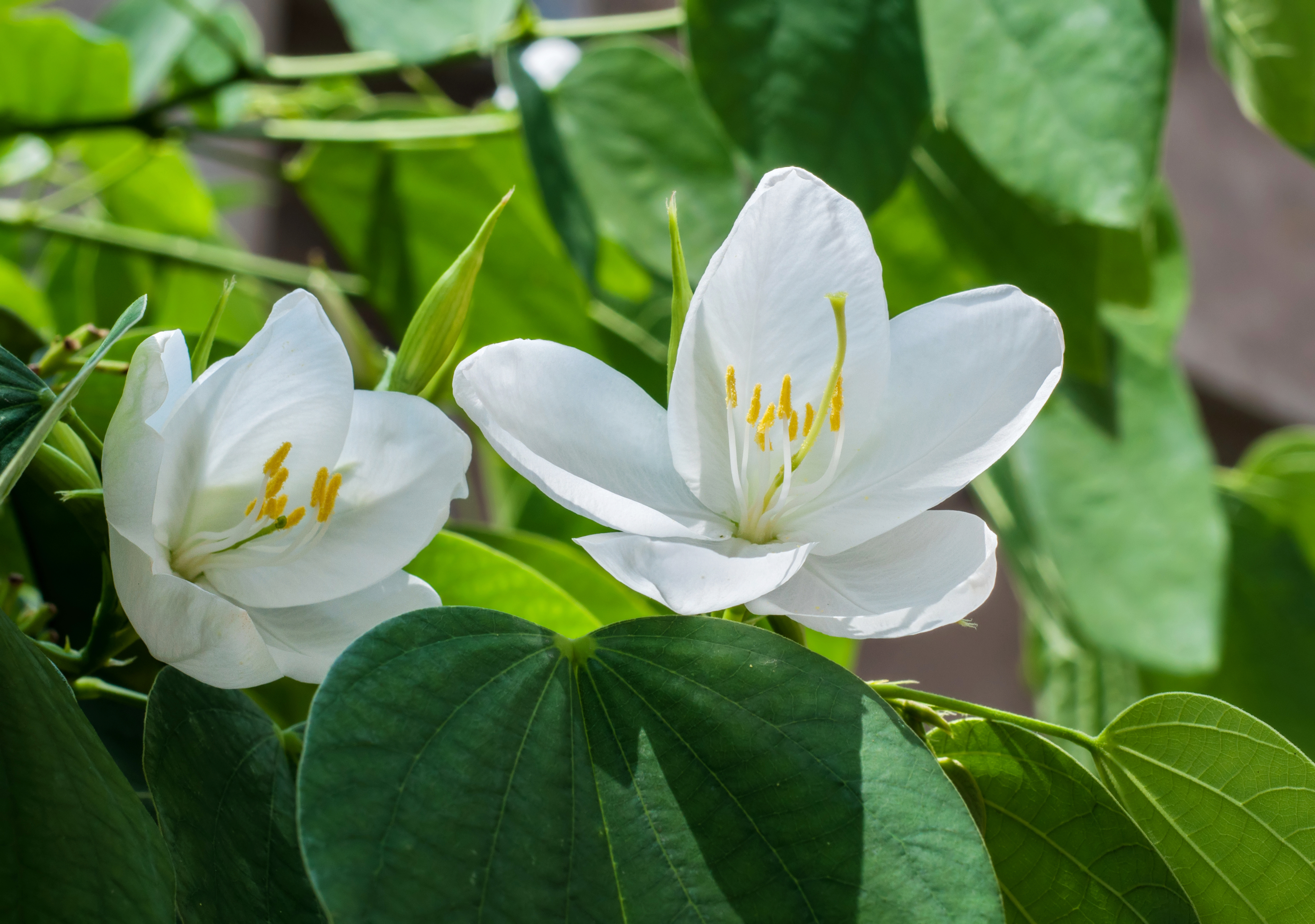
- Flower in Bardhaman, West Bengal, India

Conservation status
- Least Concern (IUCN 3.1)

Scientific classification
- Kingdom: Plantae
- Clade: Tracheophytes
- Clade: Angiosperms
- Clade: Eudicots
- Clade: Rosids
- Order: Fabales
- Family: Fabaceae
- Genus: Bauhinia
- Species: B. acuminata

Binomial name
- Bauhinia acuminata L.

= Bauhinia acuminata =

Species of legume

Bauhinia acuminata is a species of flowering shrub native to tropical southeastern Asia. Common names include dwarf white bauhinia, white orchid-tree and snowy orchid-tree. The exact native range is obscure due to extensive cultivation, but probably from Malaysia, Indonesia (Java, Borneo, Kalimantan, Lesser Sunda Islands), and the Philippines.

It grows two to three meters tall. Like the other Bauhinia species, the leaves are bilobed, shaped like an ox hoof; they are 6 to 15 centimetres (2 1/4 to 6 in) long and broad, with the apical cleft up to 5 centimetres (2 in) deep; the petiole is 1.5 to 4 centimetres (1/2 to 1 1/2 in) long. The flowers are fragrant, 8 to 12 centimetres (3 1/4 to 4 3/4 in) in diameter, with five white petals, ten yellow-tipped stamens and a green stigma. The fruit is a pod 7.5 to 15 centimetres (3 to 6 in) long and 1.5 to 1.8 centimetres (1/2 to 3/4 in) broad. The species occurs in deciduous forests and scrub.

It is widely cultivated throughout the tropics as an ornamental plant. It may be found as an escape from cultivation in some areas, and has become naturalised on the Cape York Peninsula, Australia.

The plant has a number of ethnobotanical uses around the world. The roots are used by the Javanese to treat cough and cold and in India the leaves and bark are used to treat asthma. It is also used in many culinary dishes of Odisha

== Gallery ==
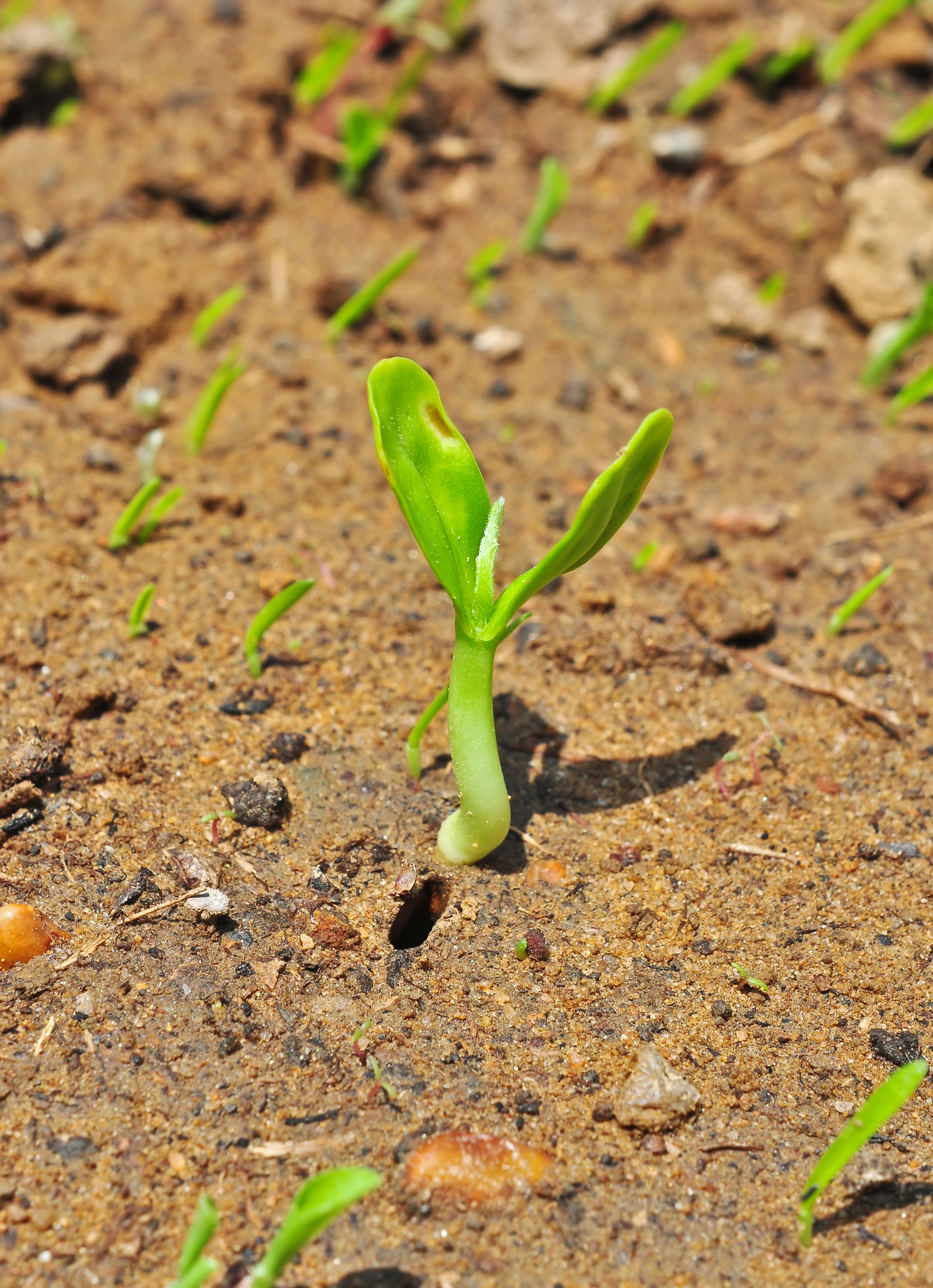
Seedling

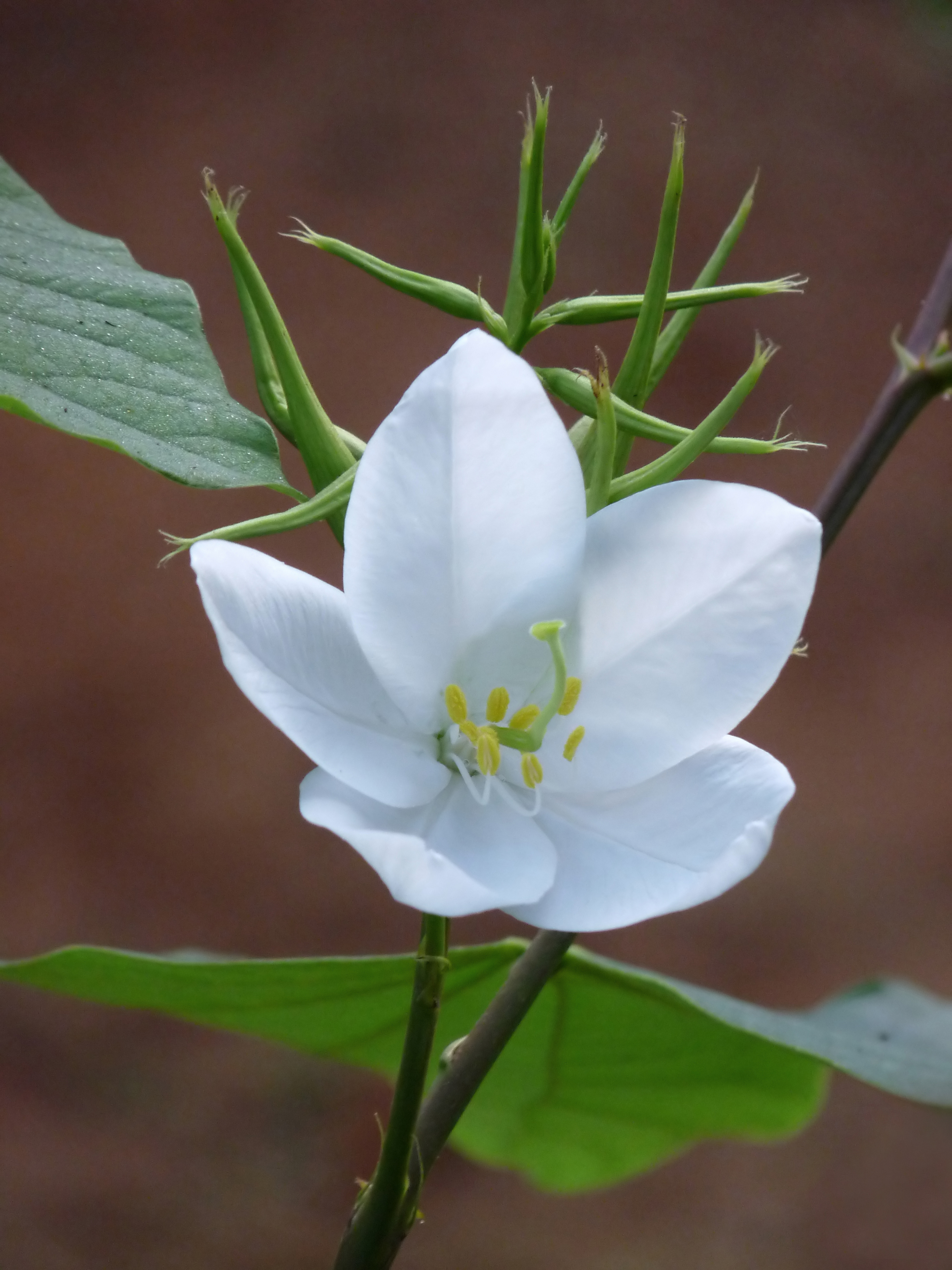
Flower

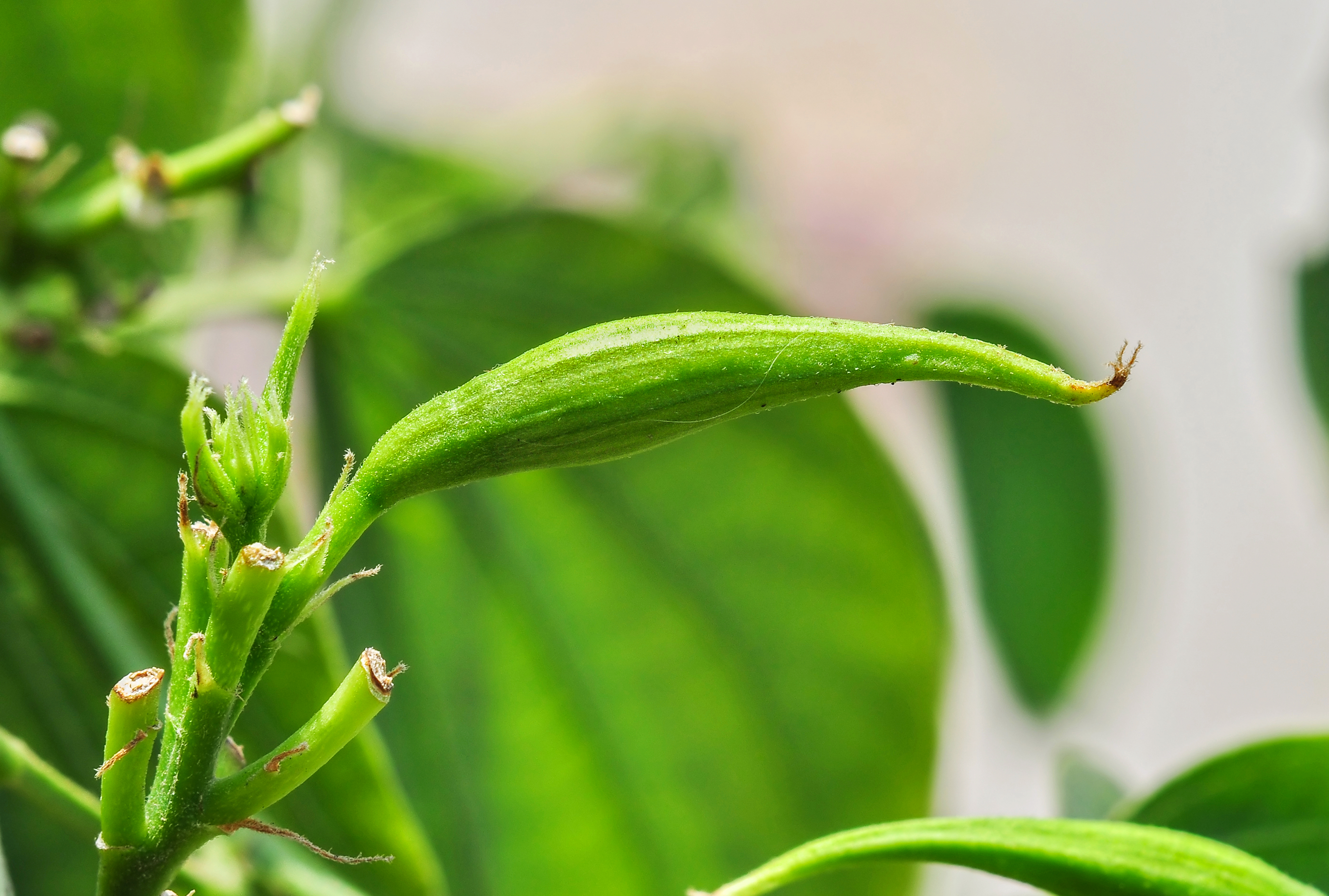
Young green pod

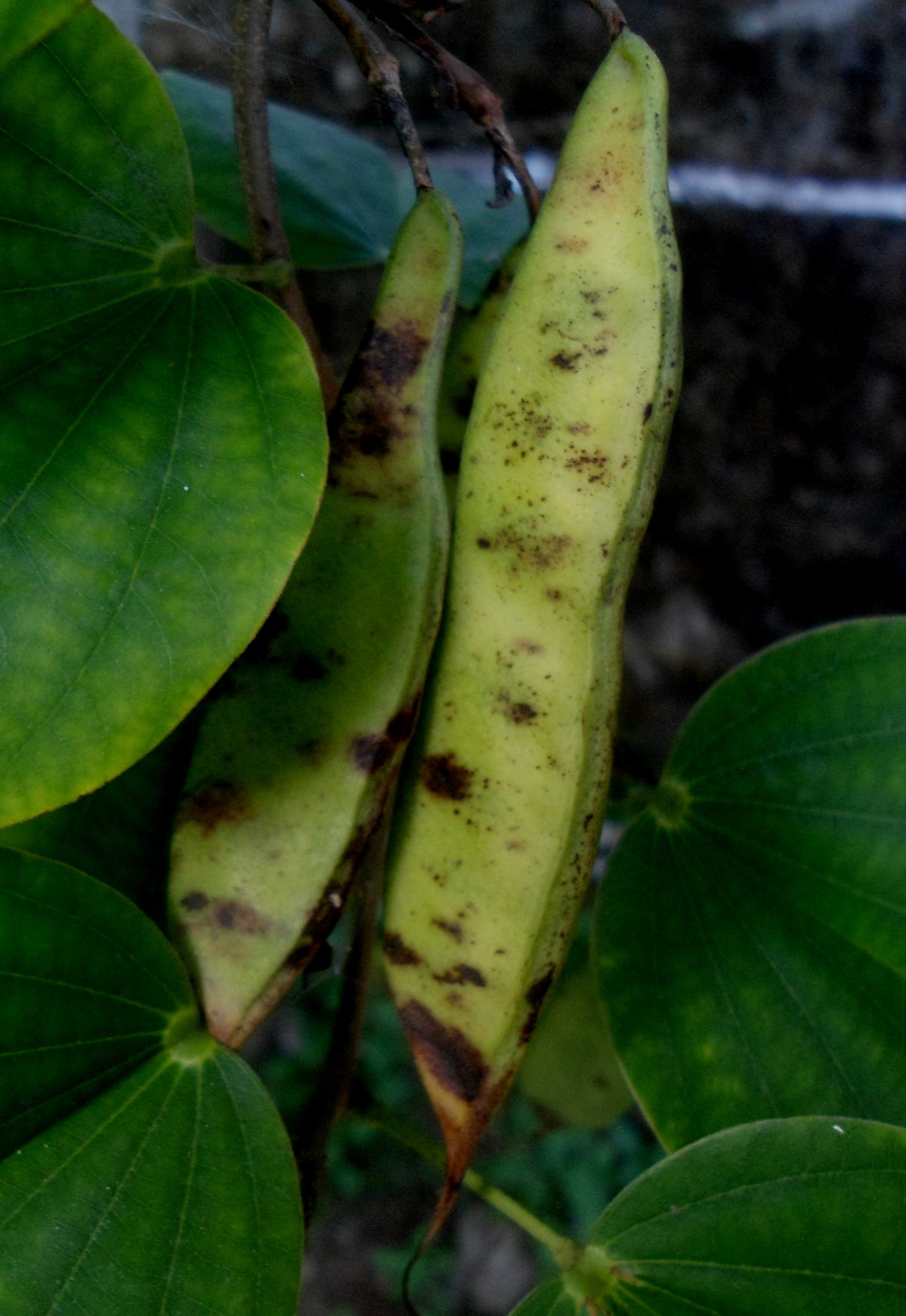
Pods

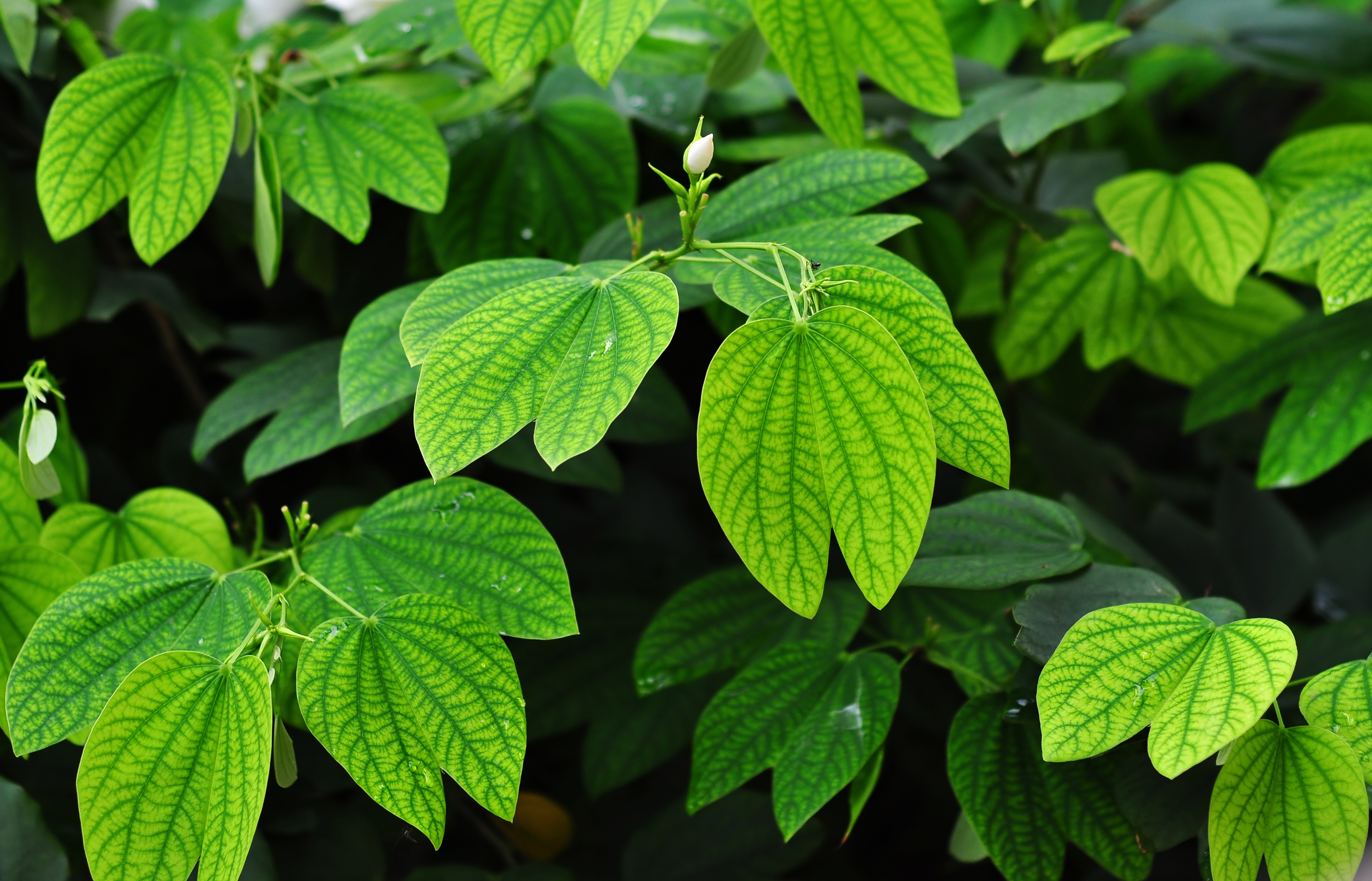
Foliage

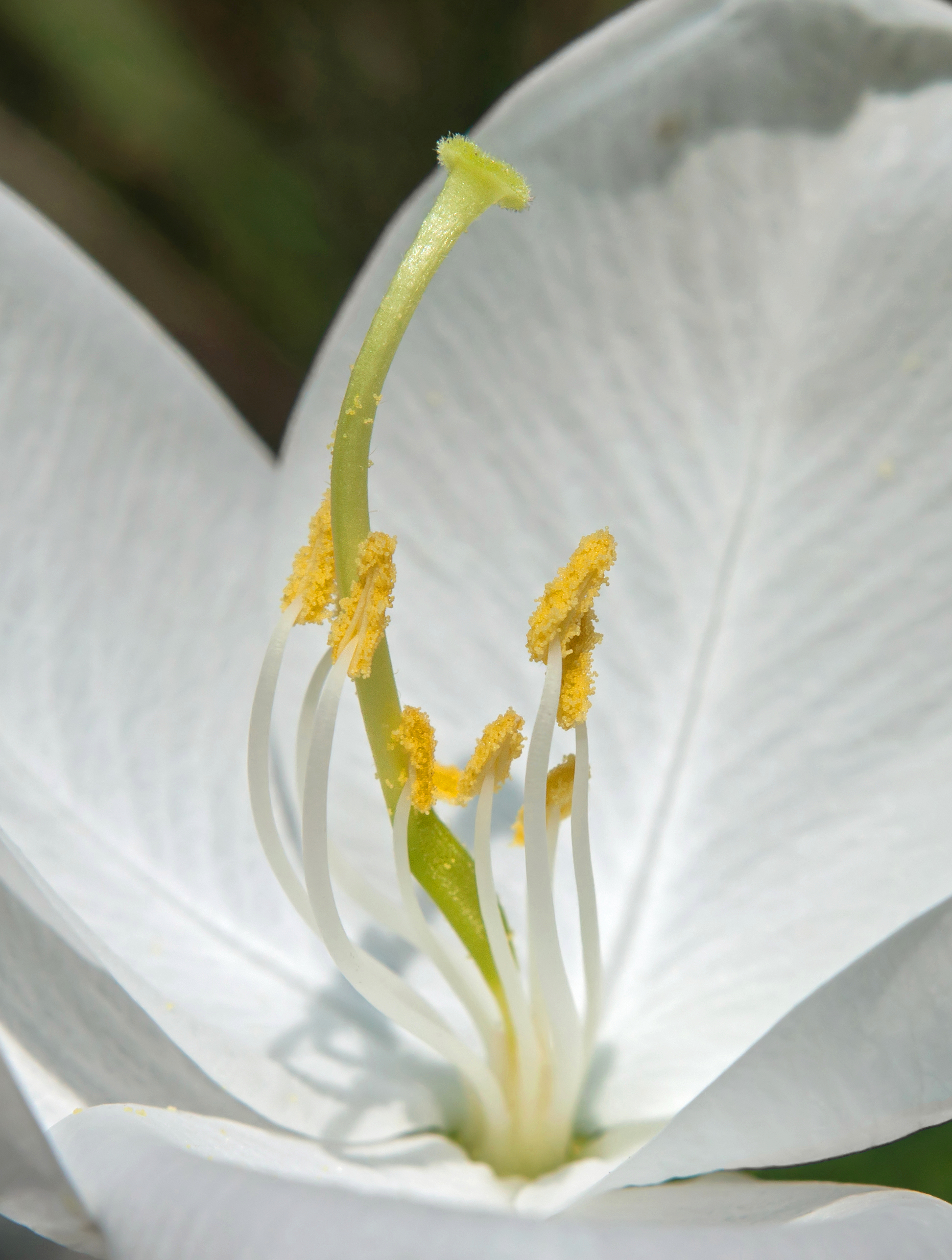
Stamens (filaments, anthers), style, stigma

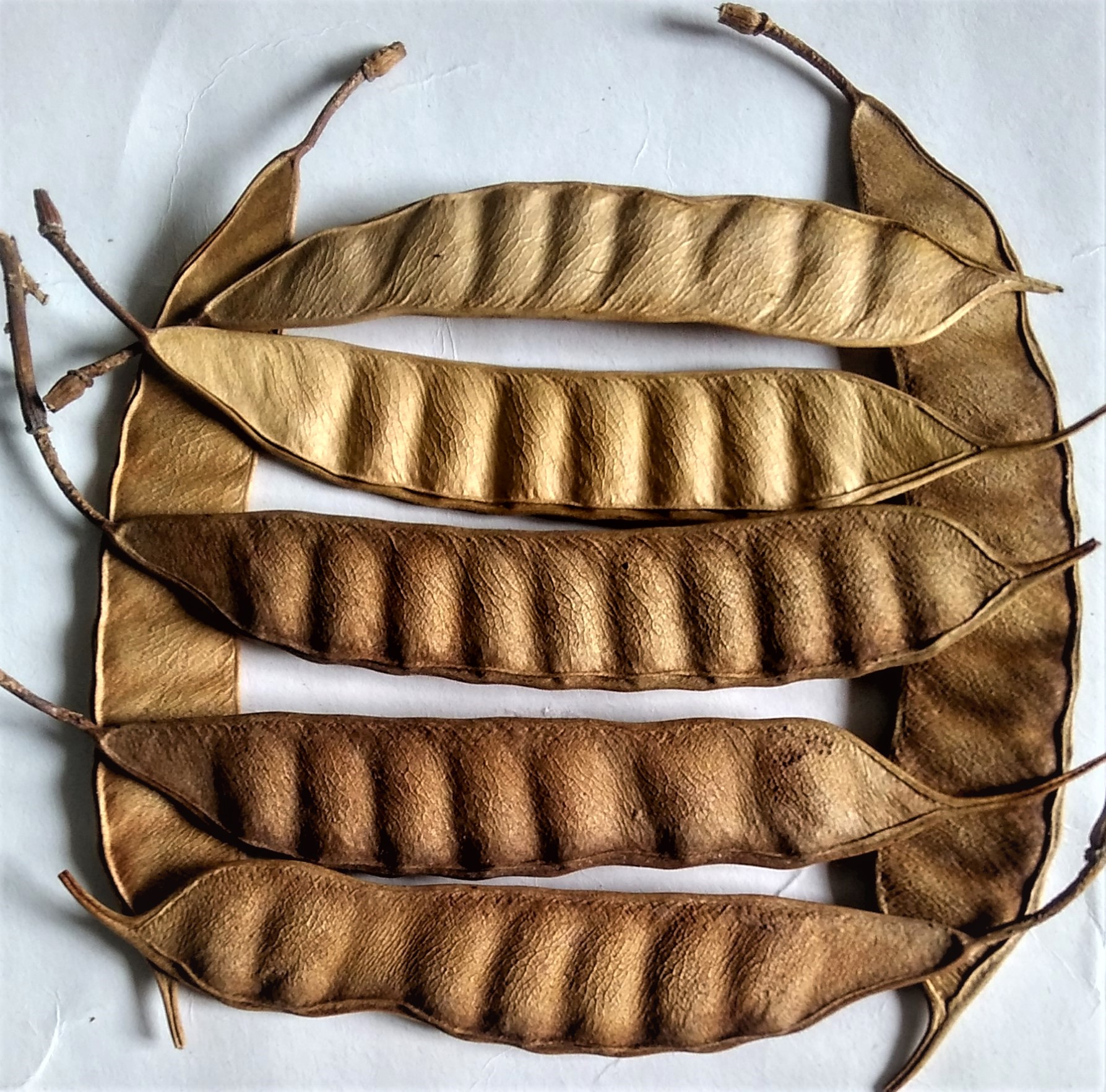
Dried pods

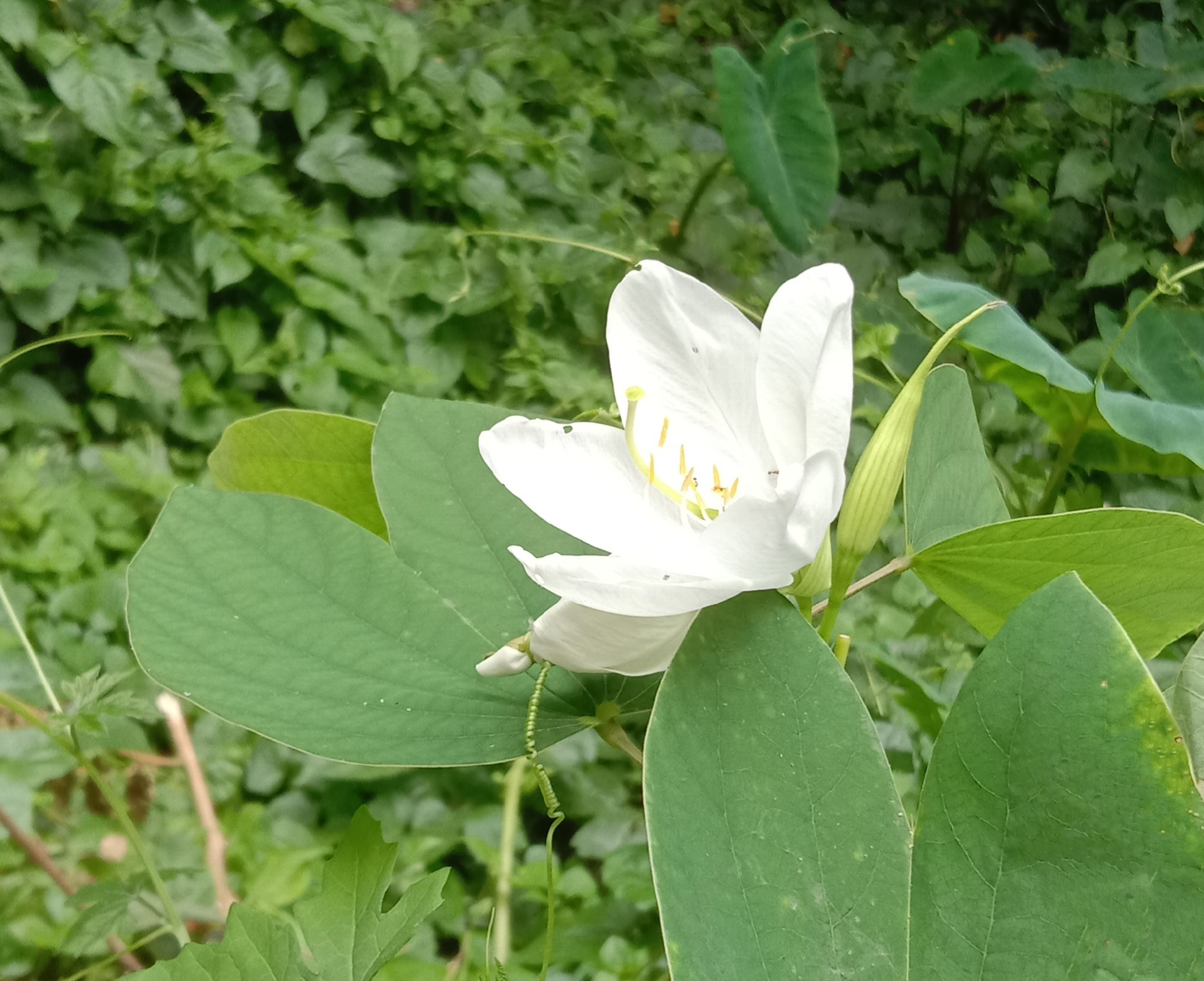
Flower and bud in West Bengal, India.

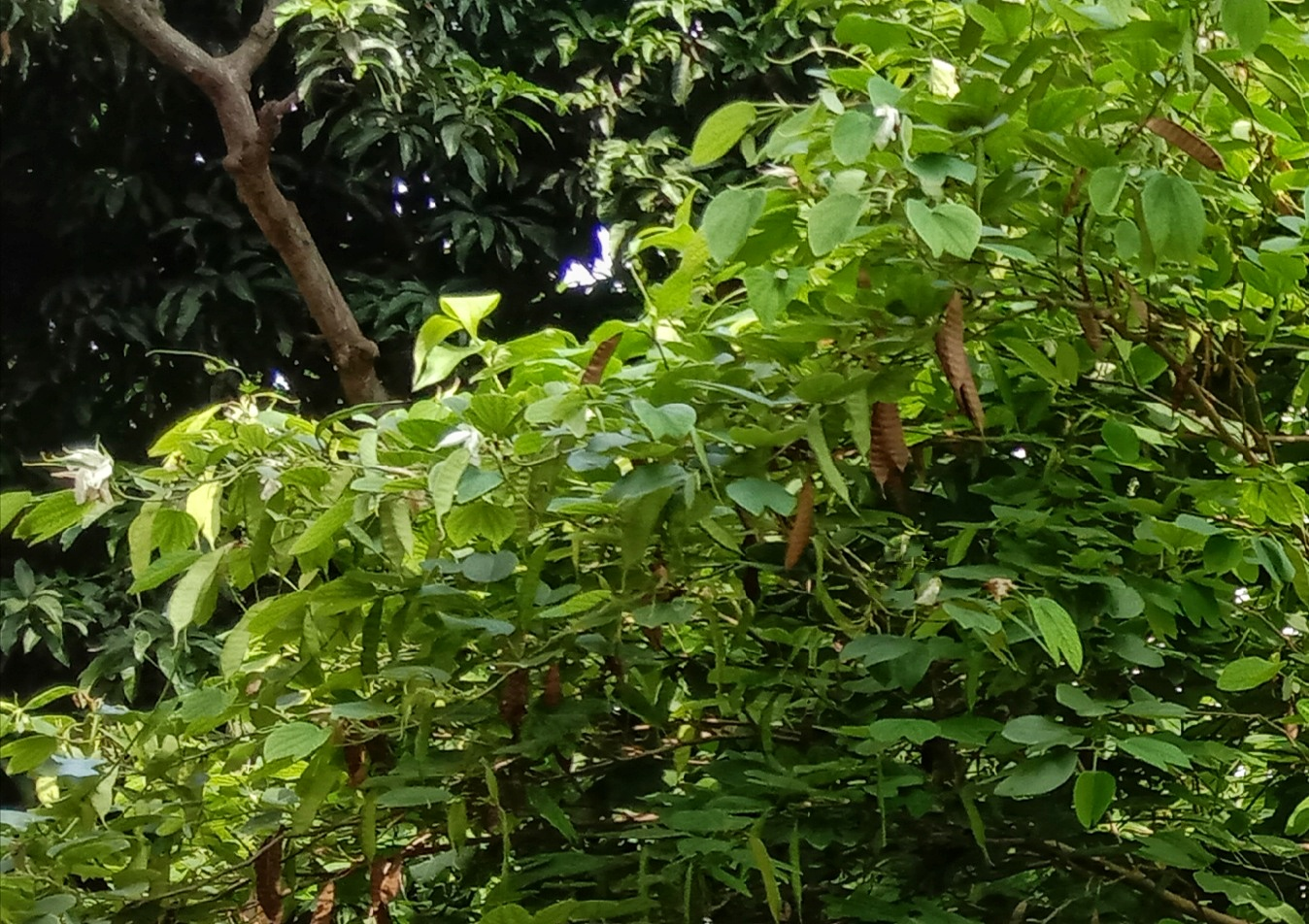
Flowers and pods of a shrub in India

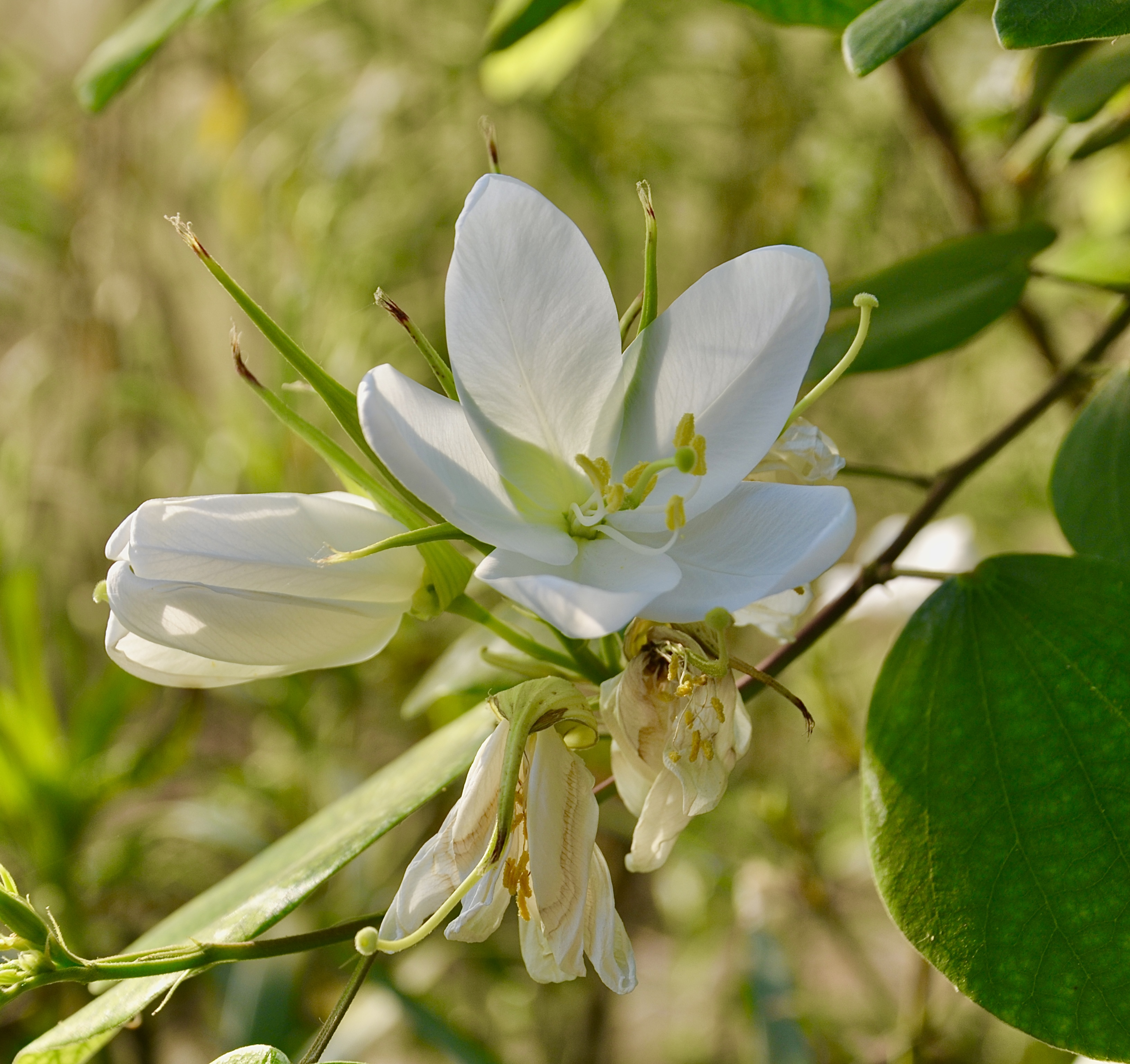
Withered and bloomed Bauhinia Flowers
