= Ramna Thana =

Thana in Dhaka South City Corporation, Bangladesh

Ramna Thana রমনা থানা
- Thana
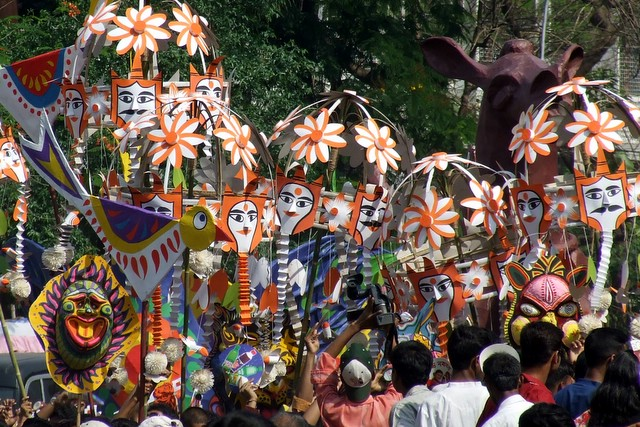
- Bengali New Year celebrations in Ramna Park
- Expandable map of vicinity of Ramna Thana
- Coordinates: 23°44′24″N 90°24′08″E
- Country: Bangladesh
- Division: Dhaka Division
- District: Dhaka District
- Formed: 1921

Area
  - Total: 3.84 km^{2} (1.48 sq mi)
- Elevation: 23 m (75 ft)

Population (2022)
  - Total: 200,436
- Time zone: UTC+6 (BST)
- Postal code: 1217
- Area code: 02

Ramna (Bengali: রমনা) is a thana (precinct) in central Dhaka and a historic colonial neighbourhood. Once the site of Mughal gardens, it developed into an institutional area during British rule in the late 19th century. It became a focal point for Dhaka's modernisation in the 1960s. It was the scene of many tumultuous events that ushered the independence of Bangladesh in 1971. Ramna Thana falls under the jurisdiction of Dhaka South City Corporation.

Ramna Thana hosts the Ramna Park (also known as Ramna Green), which is the most popular park in Dhaka. The annual parades and concerts of the Bengali New Year take place in Ramna Thana.

Ramna Thana is also home to the official residences of the Bangladeshi ministers and official state guest houses, including other important establishments such as the Dhaka Club.

== History ==
The history of Ramna can be traced back to the Mughal period. In the 18th century, this area, situated on the northern outskirts of Dhaka, housed a garden known as Bagh-e-Badshahi, meaning King's Garden. Located near the residential areas of Sujatpur and Chistia, the garden stretched from the present-day Old High Court Building area to the Sarak Bhaban (Roads and Highways Department). The name Ramna was commonly used to refer to the open grassy area between the garden and the residential areas. Notable Mughal-era landmarks, such as the High Court Mazar (shrine) and Shahbaz Khan Mosque, were built in 1679 and still exist today.

During the British era, neglect caused the Mughal-built areas to fall into ruins and become almost uninhabited, although Bagh-e-Badshahi remained somewhat intact. By the early 19th century,

Dhaka further declined and became sparsely populated. In 1819, magistrate Charles Dawes, considered the father of modern Dhaka, was granted authority to renovate the northern parts of the city, including the Ramna area. Dawes cleared the area, improved roads, and built a horse-racing track in 1825, establishing the racecourse of Dhaka, now Suhrawardy Udyan, in Bagh-e-Badshahi. Dawes also dug a large lake in the middle of the open space in Ramna. However, development of the city halted in 1829, causing Ramna to lose its allure until a municipal committee redeveloped the area in 1840. According to an 1859 map of Dhaka, Ramna was seen divided into two distinct parts: the racecourse, and a vast open space known as Ramna Plains.

When Dhaka became the capital of the province of Eastern Bengal and Assam in 1905, the Ramna area was chosen to establish a new civil station. The government acquired land and constructed various buildings, including the Governor's House, and Ramna Park (also Ramna Green), designed by R.L. Proudlock from London's Kew Botanical Gardens in Ramna Plains. Several still-existing roads were built, namely Minto Road, Hare Road, and Fuller Road. Ramna was divided into three areas: Ramna Civil Station, Ramna Racecourse, and Ramna Park.

In 1911, Dhaka Club was established north of the racecourse, primarily for Europeans. Dhaka and Jagannath colleges were provided parts of the renovated areas and buildings in Ramna between 1912 and 1920. Parts of Ramna was acquired by the East Pakistan government after partition, leading to various developments.

After independence, the Ramna area underwent further developments, including the construction of memorials and Shishu Park.

According to Banglapedia (2012), Ramna Thana was formed in 1921, while the Encyclopedia of Dhaka (2012) mentions that it was formed in 1976. In 2006 and 2018, parts of Ramna Thana were split to form Shahbag and Hatirjheel thanas respectively.

== Geography ==
As of 2012, Ramna Thana covers 3.84 square kilometres (1.48 sq mi), (Note: According to the Encyclopedia of Dhaka (2012), Ramna Thana occupied 6 km^{2} (2.3 sq mi).) bordered by Tejgaon Industrial Area and Rampura thanas to the north, Shahbagh Thana to the south, Rampura, Motijheel, and Paltan thanas to the east, and Kalabagan, New Market, and Tejgaon thanas to the west.

=== Notable institutes ===
Ramna Thana accommodates numerous residences of ministers on Minto Road and the Chief Justice's residence on Hare Road, in addition to some important establishments:

- Office of the Comptroller and Auditor General
- Ministry of Expatriates' Welfare and Overseas Employment
- Dhaka Mass Transit Company Limited headquarters (former)
- Bureau of Manpower, Employment and Training (BMET)
- Foreign Service Academy
- Dhaka Metropolitan Police HQ
- Holy Family Red Crescent Medical College Hospital
- Bangladesh Tennis Federation

== Demographics ==
According to the 2022 Bangladeshi census, Ramna Thana had a total population of 200,436 and 54,050 houses. The Dhaka South section had 56,759 residents, while the Dhaka North section accommodated 143,677 people.

At the 2011 Census of Bangladesh, Ramna Thana had a population of 200,973 with average household size of 4.8 members, and an average literacy rate of 78.3% vs national average of 51.8% literacy.

== Namesakes ==
In Islamabad, Pakistan, the term 'Ramna' denotes the areas encompassed by the G-series sectors. This nomenclature originates from the neighbourhood in Dhaka, Bangladesh, and was adopted during the period when East Pakistan was a part of Pakistan. It was intended to acknowledge the significance of Dhaka's Ramna area to West Pakistan.

== See also ==
- Thanas of Bangladesh
