= Bangladesh Tennis Federation =

Sports governing body

- Formation: 1972
- Headquarters: Ramna, Dhaka, Bangladesh
- Region served: Bangladesh
- Official language: Bengali
- Website: https://btftennis.org/

Bangladesh Tennis Federation is the national federation for tennis and is responsible for governing the sport in Bangladesh.

== History ==
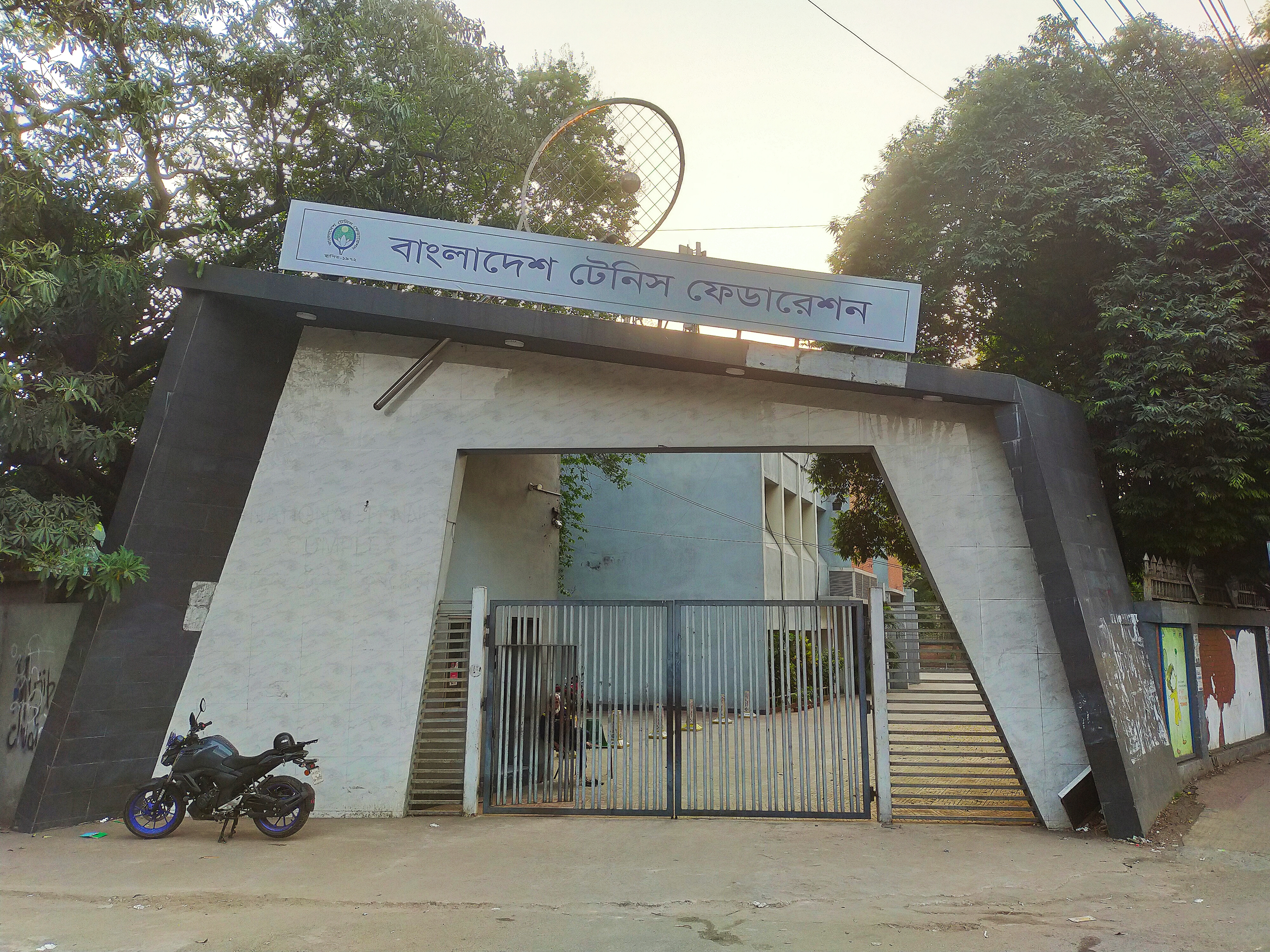
Main Gate of Bangladesh Tennis Federation

Bangladesh Tennis Federation was established in 1972. It established the National Tennis Complex in Ramna, Dhaka in 1977. In 1985, the Federation became a member of the International Tennis Federation based in London, United Kingdom. It is also affiliated with Bangladesh Krira Shikkha Protishtan. The federation is associated with 8 tennis clubs in Bangladesh; they are Barisal Tennis Club, Comilla Tennis Club, Engineers' Tennis Club, Mymensingh Tennis Club, Naogaon Tennis Club, Patuakhaii Tennis Club, Rajshahi Tennis Complex, and Sylhet Tennis Club.

In November 2019, Golam Morshed, General Secretary of the federation, was suspended following a suit filed against him for sexual harassment at Gulshan Police Station by a female tennis player. In 2020, the federation received criticism in the media for providing a fully funded trip to senior officials to the Australian Open.
