= Sallehuddin Damit =

Bruneian footballer

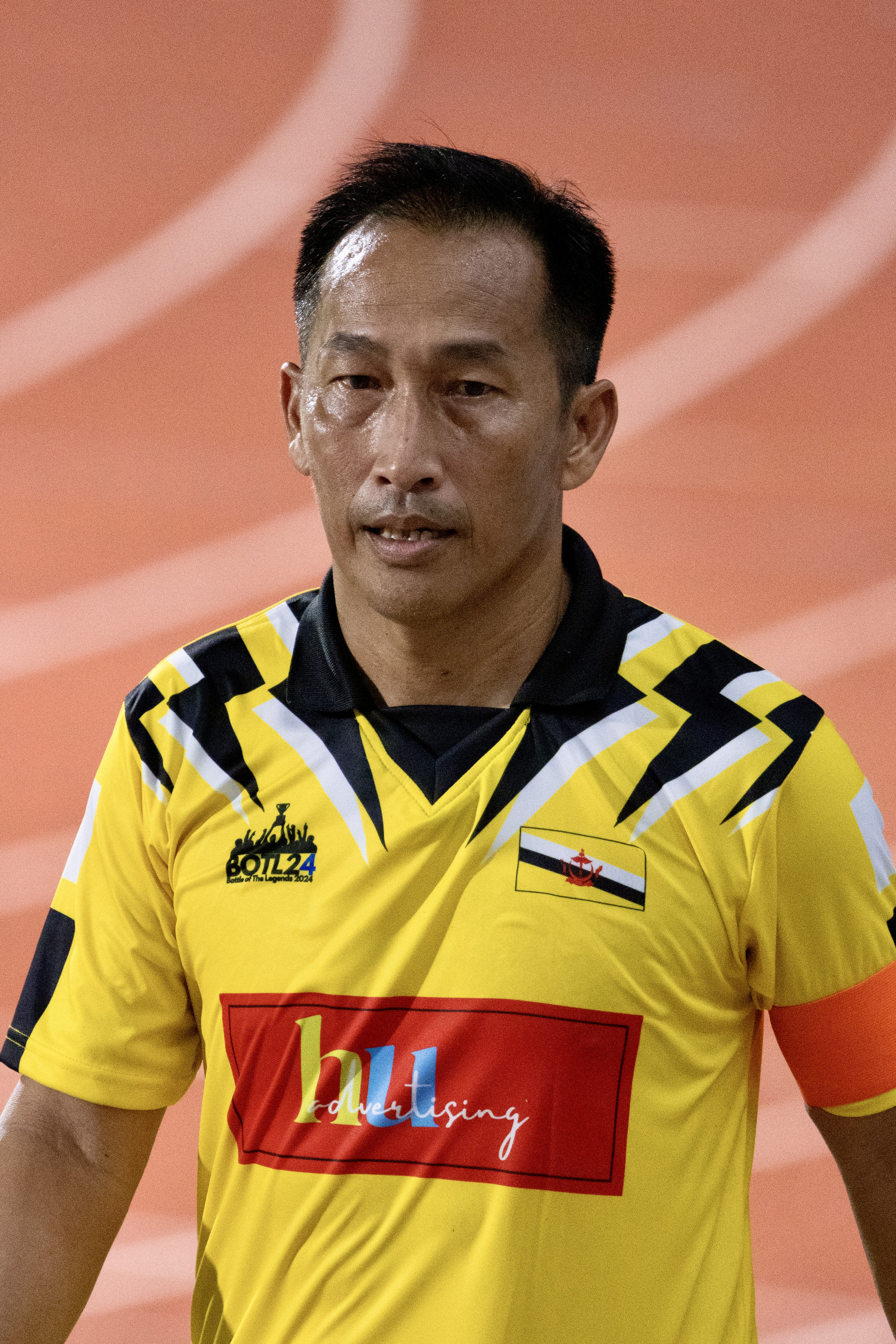
- Sallehudin in 2024

Personal information
- Full name: Pengiran Sallehuddin bin Pengiran Haji Damit
- Date of birth: 5 November 1973 (age 53)
- Place of birth: Brunei
- Height: 1.72 m (5 ft 8 in)
- Positions: Defender; defensive midfielder

Senior career*
Years	Team	Apps	(Gls)
1993–2004	Brunei		
2001–2006	AH United		
2006–2013	DPMM		
2010	→ AH United (loan)		
2011	→ AM Gunners (loan)		
2014	Majra United		
2015–2016	Kota Ranger		
2017–2019	Kasuka		(1)

International career^{‡}
1994–2008	Brunei	19+	(2+)
- * Club domestic league appearances and goals as of 17 November 2025 ‡ National team caps and goals as of 23 January 2017

Pengiran Sallehuddin bin Pengiran Haji Damit (born 5 November 1973) is a Bruneian former footballer who played as a defender. One of the legends of Bruneian football, he most notably played for the Brunei M-League representative team that won the 1999 Malaysia Cup, which is regarded as Brunei football's greatest achievement. He also played professionally for Brunei DPMM FC for several seasons.

Prior to his marriage in 2001, his given name was Awangku Sallehuddin due to naming rules for descendants of Bruneian royalty.

== Club career ==
=== Early career ===
Sallehuddin began his sporting career playing tennis under a government scheme, representing Brunei at the Davis Cup in 1994 and 1995. It was around this time that he also made his football debut in the Malaysia Premier League, appearing for the Brunei representative team.

Towards the turn of the century Sallehuddin found more playing time in expense of the ageing Martilu Mohamed on the left side of a back three, a formation favoured by David Booth and his successor Mick Jones. He started the 1999 Malaysia Cup final alongside captain and fellow legend Liew Chuan Fue and first-season debutant Norsillmy Taha and claimed a 2–1 victory in Kuala Lumpur through two goals by Rosli Liman.

Sallehuddin inherited the captain's armband from Liew and stayed with Brunei as the severely-depleted team were immediately relegated to Premier Two, managing only two wins and conceding the most goals (53). He stayed with Brunei in the second tier of Malaysian football until 2005.

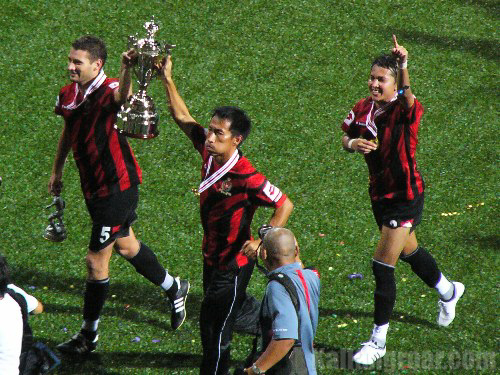
Sallehuddin (middle) celebrating the 2009 Singapore League Cup

=== DPMM ===
Sallehuddin played with local club AH United in the B-League (winning the 2005-06 FA Cup) until April 2006 when he transferred to Brunei DPMM FC who were playing in the Malaysia Premier League for the first time after replacing Sallehuddin's own former team, Brunei. They achieved promotion to the 2006-07 Malaysia Super League that season via the play-offs, and then astoundingly finished third in Malaysia's top tier thanks to goals from topscoring Shahrazen Said.

DPMM moved to the Singaporean S.League in 2009, after the deregistration of the Brunei Football Association (BAFA) by the Registrar of Societies prompted the Football Association of Malaysia to exempt DPMM from the Super League. Sallehuddin was appointed captain and won the Singapore League Cup of that year, despite being suspended in the final. After an incident in the 39th minute in the game against Home United on 2 August, he was given a one-year ban by the Football Association of Singapore for bringing the game into disrepute. A month later, FIFA suspended Brunei which meant that DPMM could no longer play in the S.League. With only five matches to go, all of DPMM's results were expunged from record.

Sallehuddin returned to AH United on loan in the 2010 Brunei Premier League 1, then AM Gunners for the short-lived 2011 season. Recalled to his parent club after their re-entry into the S.League in 2012, the 39-year-old was still being relied on by coach Vjeran Simunic. Sallehuddin won the League Cup and finished second in the league behind Tampines Rovers in 2012, but after a disappointing 2013 campaign, he was released in the close season.

=== Majra United ===
Sallehuddin joined Brunei Super League team Majra United FC in the 2014 season. With the club struggling near the bottom at the halfway point of the season, Majra United withdrew from the league after captain Faizal Mohammad was given a five year ban for punching the referee in an abandoned fixture against MS ABDB on May 13 with the club also given a $500 fine, which club officials deemed unfair.

=== Kota Ranger ===
Sallehuddin dropped a division and lined up one last time alongside Norsillmy Taha at Kota Ranger FC in the 2015 Brunei Premier League. He helped his team go top of the table and win promotion to the 2016 Brunei Super League.

=== Kasuka ===
Sallehuddin joined Kasuka at the beginning of the 2017–18 Brunei Super League season, initially as a coach. On 12 April 2019, Sallehuddin scored on the 44th minute against Najip FC in an 8–1 victory at the 2018–19 Brunei Super League, making him the oldest scorer in the history of the Brunei leagues at the age of 45 years, 5 months and 7 days. He then transitioned into a full-time backroom staff and remained with Kasuka until 2023.

== International career ==
Sallehuddin played three games for the national team at the 20th SEA Games held in Brunei, scoring the third goal in the first game against Cambodia in a 3–3 draw. His next two international tournaments were the 2000 AFC Asian Cup qualifying and the 2002 World Cup qualifying, both were disastrous campaigns where Brunei scored no goals and conceded 39.

Sallehuddin went with a team composed largely of QAF FC players for the 2006 AFC Challenge Cup held in Bangladesh, Brunei failed to advance from the group stage courtesy of goal difference. His final appearances for the national team were at the 2008 AFF Suzuki Cup qualifying held in Cambodia where he scored a penalty in the 76th minute against Timor-Leste in their only win from 4 games.

== Honours ==
=== Team ===
Brunei M-League representative team

- Malaysia Cup: 1999

AH United

- HMYC Cup: 2001
- Brunei FA Cup: 2005–06

Brunei DPMM FC

- Singapore League Cup (2): 2009, 2012

Kota Ranger FC

- Brunei Premier League: 2015

=== Individual ===
- Meritorious Service Medal (PJK; 1999)
