= 1995 Davis Cup Asia/Oceania Zone Group III =

International tennis competition

The Asia/Oceania Zone was one of the three zones of the regional Davis Cup competition in 1995.

In the Asia/Oceania Zone there were three different tiers, called groups, in which teams competed against each other to advance to the upper tier. Winners in Group III advanced to the Asia/Oceania Zone Group II in 1996. All other teams remained in Group III.

== Participating nations ==
- Bahrain
- Bangladesh
- Brunei
- Jordan
- Kazakhstan
- Kuwait
- Lebanon
- Oman
- Pacific Oceania
- Saudi Arabia
- Singapore
- Syria
- United Arab Emirates

=== Draw ===
- Venue: Dubai Creek Golf & Yacht Club, Dubai, United Arab Emirates
- Date: 10–16 April

Group A

	BHR	SIN	KUW	SYR	KAZ	OMA	BRU	RR; W–L	Match; W–L	Set; W–L	Standings
Bahrain		2–1	2–1	3–0	2–1	2–1	3–0	6–0	14–4 (78%)	30–11 (73%)	1
Singapore	1–2		3–0	3–0	3–0	3–0	3–0	5–1	16–2 (89%)	33–9 (79%)	2
Kuwait	1–2	0–3		3–0	3–0	3–0	3–0	4–2	13–5 (72%)	29–11 (73%)	3
Syria	0–3	0–3	0–3		3–0	2–1	3–0	3–3	8–10 (44%)	19–21 (48%)	4
Kazakhstan	1–2	0–3	0–3	0–3		1–2	2–1	1–5	4–14 (22%)	12–28 (30%)	5
Oman	1–2	0–3	0–3	1–2	2–1		1–2	1–5	5–13 (28%)	10–30 (25%)	6
Brunei	0–3	0–3	0–3	0–3	1–2	2–1		1–5	3–15 (17%)	7–30 (19%)	7

Group B

	KSA	BAN	POC	LIB	JOR	UAE	RR; W–L	Match; W–L	Set; W–L	Standings
Saudi Arabia		3–0	2–1	2–1	3–0	2–1	5–0	12–3 (80%)	25–9 (74%)	1
Bangladesh	0–3		2–1	2–1	3–0	3–0	4–1	10–5 (67%)	21–12 (64%)	2
Pacific Oceania	1–2	1–2		2–1	3–0	3–0	3–2	10–5 (67%)	22–16 (58%)	3
Lebanon	1–2	1–2	1–2		2–1	3–0	2–3	8–7 (53%)	19–15 (56%)	4
Jordan	0–3	0–3	0–3	1–2		2–1	1–4	3–12 (20%)	10–24 (29%)	5
United Arab Emirates	1–2	0–3	0–3	0–3	1–2		0–5	2–13 (13%)	5–26 (16%)	6

- Bahrain and Saudi Arabia promoted to Group II in 1996.

== Group A ==
=== Bahrain vs. Syria ===
Bahrain
3
Dubai Creek Golf & Yacht Club, Dubai, United Arab Emirates
10 April 1995

Syria
0

			1	2	3
1	(Bahrain) (Syria)	Esam Abdulaal; Abdul-Rahim Salim	6; 2	4; 6	6; 2
2	(Bahrain) (Syria)	Abdul-Latif Ahmed; Lays Salim	6; 2	6; 4
3	(Bahrain) (Syria)	Esam Abdulaal / Nader Abdul-Aal; Saher Saadeldin / Abdul-Rahim Salim	6; 4	6; 2

=== Kazakhstan vs. Oman ===
Kazakhstan
1
Dubai Creek Golf & Yacht Club, Dubai, United Arab Emirates
10 April 1995

Oman
2

			1	2	3
1	(Kazakhstan) (Oman)	Maxim Novikov; Hamood Salim Al-Moamari	2; 6	6; 3	3; 6
2	(Kazakhstan) (Oman)	Igor Chaldounov; Mudrik Al-Rawahi	6; 3	3; 6	3; 6
3	(Kazakhstan) (Oman)	Dmitri Arissov / Alexey Kedryuk; Hamood Salim Al-Moamari / Mudrik Al-Rawahi	6; 2	6; 1

=== Kuwait vs. Singapore ===
Kuwait
0
Dubai Creek Golf & Yacht Club, Dubai, United Arab Emirates
10 April 1995

Singapore
3

			1	2	3
1	(Kuwait) (Singapore)	Hussain Al-Ashwak; Lim Yang-tat	6; 0	3; 6	1; 6
2	(Kuwait) (Singapore)	Adel Al-Shatti; Chen Chee-yen	2; 6	6; 3	4; 6
3	(Kuwait) (Singapore)	Adel Al-Shatti / Khaled Ashkanani; Lam Ju-min / Lim Yang-tat	1; 6	6^{0} 7^{7}

=== Brunei vs. Syria ===
Brunei
0
Dubai Creek Golf & Yacht Club, Dubai, United Arab Emirates
11 April 1995

Syria
3

			1	2	3
1	(Brunei) (Syria)	Chau Pheng-chai; Abdul-Rahim Salim	1; 6	2; 6
2	(Brunei) (Syria)	Awangku Salehuddin; Lays Salim	1; 6	5; 7
3	(Brunei) (Syria)	Chau Pheng-chai / Lim Oon-su; Saher Saadeldin / Abdul-Rahim Salim	1; 6	5; 7

=== Kazakhstan vs. Singapore ===
Kazakhstan
0
Dubai Creek Golf & Yacht Club, Dubai, United Arab Emirates
11 April 1995

Singapore
3

			1	2	3
1	(Kazakhstan) (Singapore)	Alexey Kedryuk; Lim Yang-tat	2; 6	1; 6
2	(Kazakhstan) (Singapore)	Dmitri Arissov; Chen Chee-yen	3; 6	7^{7} 6^{5}	1; 6
3	(Kazakhstan) (Singapore)	Dmitri Arissov / Alexey Kedryuk; Lam Ju-min / Lim Yang-tat	2; 6	3; 6

=== Kuwait vs. Oman ===
Kuwait
3
Dubai Creek Golf & Yacht Club, Dubai, United Arab Emirates
11 April 1995

Oman
0

			1	2	3
1	(Kuwait) (Oman)	Hussain Al-Ashwak; Hamood Salim Al-Moamari	6; 1	6; 2
2	(Kuwait) (Oman)	Adel Al-Shatti; Mudrik Al-Rawahi	6; 4	6; 4
3	(Kuwait) (Oman)	Khaled Ashkanani / Ahmed Taki; Mudrik Al-Rawahi / Barkat Salim Al-Sharji	6; 2	6; 1

=== Bahrain vs. Brunei ===
Bahrain
3
Dubai Creek Golf & Yacht Club, Dubai, United Arab Emirates
12 April 1995

Brunei
0

			1	2	3
1	(Bahrain) (Brunei)	Esam Abdulaal; Ismasufian Ibrahim	6; 0	6; 1
2	(Bahrain) (Brunei)	Abdul-Latif Ahmed; Awangku Salehuddin	6; 4	7^{7} 6^{3}
3	(Bahrain) (Brunei)	Esam Abdulaal / Nader Abdul-Aal; Chau Pheng-chai / Lim Oon-su	6; 4	6; 0

=== Kazakhstan vs. Kuwait ===
Kazakhstan
0
Dubai Creek Golf & Yacht Club, Dubai, United Arab Emirates
12 April 1995

Kuwait
3

			1	2	3
1	(Kazakhstan) (Kuwait)	Maxim Novikov; Hussain Al-Ashwak	0; 6	2; 6
2	(Kazakhstan) (Kuwait)	Igor Chaldounov; Adel Al-Shatti	1; 6	3; 6
3	(Kazakhstan) (Kuwait)	Dmitri Arissov / Alexey Kedryuk; Khaled Ashkanani / Ahmed Taki	5; 7	4; 6

=== Oman vs. Singapore ===
Oman
0
Dubai Creek Golf & Yacht Club, Dubai, United Arab Emirates
12 April 1995

Singapore
3

			1	2	3
1	(Oman) (Singapore)	Mudrik Al-Rawahi; Lam Ju-min	1; 6	3; 6
2	(Oman) (Singapore)	Barkat Salim Al-Sharji; Chen Chee-yen	1; 6	1; 6
3	(Oman) (Singapore)	Mohammed Ibrahim Al-Balushi / Mudrik Al-Rawahi; Lam Ju-min / Lim Yang-tat	3; 6	1; 6

=== Bahrain vs. Kazakhstan ===
Bahrain
2
Dubai Creek Golf & Yacht Club, Dubai, United Arab Emirates
13 April 1995

Kazakhstan
1

			1	2	3
1	(Bahrain) (Kazakhstan)	Esam Abdulaal; Alexey Kedryuk	6; 2	6; 4
2	(Bahrain) (Kazakhstan)	Abdul-Latif Ahmed; Dmitri Arissov	1; 6	0; 6
3	(Bahrain) (Kazakhstan)	Esam Abdulaal / Nader Abdul-Aal; Dmitri Arissov / Igor Chaldounov	6; 2	6; 3

=== Brunei vs. Oman ===
Brunei
2
Dubai Creek Golf & Yacht Club, Dubai, United Arab Emirates
13 April 1995

Oman
1

			1	2	3
1	(Brunei) (Oman)	Ismasufian Ibrahim; Hamood Salim Al-Moamari	6; 2	6; 0
2	(Brunei) (Oman)	Awangku Salehuddin; Mudrik Al-Rawahi	1; 6	2; 6
3	(Brunei) (Oman)	Chau Pheng-chai / Ismasufian Ibrahim; Hamood Salim Al-Moamari / Mudrik Al-Rawahi	6; 4	6; 4

=== Kuwait vs. Syria ===
Kuwait
3
Dubai Creek Golf & Yacht Club, Dubai, United Arab Emirates
13 April 1995

Syria
0

			1	2	3
1	(Kuwait) (Syria)	Hussain Al-Ashwak; Abdul-Rahim Salim	6; 2	6; 3
2	(Kuwait) (Syria)	Adel Al-Shatti; Lays Salim	6; 0	6; 0
3	(Kuwait) (Syria)	Khaled Ashkanani / Ahmed Taki; Saher Saadeldin / Salahuddin Tawil	7; 5	6; 0

=== Bahrain vs. Kuwait ===
Bahrain
2
Dubai Creek Golf & Yacht Club, Dubai, United Arab Emirates
14 April 1995

Kuwait
1

			1	2	3
1	(Bahrain) (Kuwait)	Esam Abdulaal; Hussain Al-Ashwak	7; 5	6; 4
2	(Bahrain) (Kuwait)	Abdul-Latif Ahmed; Adel Al-Shatti	0; 6	1; 6
3	(Bahrain) (Kuwait)	Esam Abdulaal / Nader Abdul-Aal; Adel Al-Shatti / Khaled Ashkanani	4; 6	6; 1	6; 2

=== Brunei vs. Singapore ===
Brunei
0
Dubai Creek Golf & Yacht Club, Dubai, United Arab Emirates
14 April 1995

Singapore
3

			1	2	3
1	(Brunei) (Singapore)	Chau Pheng-chai; Lam Ju-min	0; 6	1; 6
2	(Brunei) (Singapore)	Ismasufian Ibrahim; Lim Yang-tat	1; 6	1; 6
3	(Brunei) (Singapore)	Chau Pheng-chai / Lim Oon-su; Chen Chee-yen / Lim Yang-tat	1; 6	2; 6

=== Kazakhstan vs. Syria ===
Kazakhstan
0
Dubai Creek Golf & Yacht Club, Dubai, United Arab Emirates
14 April 1995

Syria
3

			1	2	3
1	(Kazakhstan) (Syria)	Maxim Novikov; Saher Saadeldin	1; 6	0; 6
2	(Kazakhstan) (Syria)	Igor Chaldounov; Abdul-Rahim Salim	3; 6	3; 6
3	(Kazakhstan) (Syria)	Dmitri Arissov / Alexey Kedryuk; Lays Salim / Salahuddin Tawil	6; 4	3; 6	2; 6

=== Bahrain vs. Oman ===
Bahrain
2
Dubai Creek Golf & Yacht Club, Dubai, United Arab Emirates
15 April 1995

Oman
1

			1	2	3
1	(Bahrain) (Oman)	Esam Abdulaal; Hamood Salim Al-Moamari	6; 0	6; 0
2	(Bahrain) (Oman)	Abdul-Latif Ahmed; Mudrik Al-Rawahi	6; 3	6^{4} 7^{7}	5; 7
3	(Bahrain) (Oman)	Esam Abdulaal / Nader Abdul-Aal; Mudrik Al-Rawahi / Barkat Salim Al-Sharji	6; 2	6; 1

=== Brunei vs. Kazakhstan ===
Brunei
1
Dubai Creek Golf & Yacht Club, Dubai, United Arab Emirates
15 April 1995

Kazakhstan
2

			1	2	3
1	(Brunei) (Kazakhstan)	Ismasufian Ibrahim; Alexey Kedryuk	6^{3} 7^{7}	4; 6
2	(Brunei) (Kazakhstan)	Awangku Salehuddin; Dmitri Arissov	3; 6	1; 6
3	(Brunei) (Kazakhstan)	Chau Pheng-chai / Awangku Salehuddin; Igor Chaldounov / Maxim Novikov	6; 2	6; 1

=== Singapore vs. Syria ===
Singapore
3
Dubai Creek Golf & Yacht Club, Dubai, United Arab Emirates
15 April 1995

Syria
0

			1	2	3
1	(Singapore) (Syria)	Lim Yang-tat; Abdul-Rahim Salim	6; 3	6; 2
2	(Singapore) (Syria)	Chen Chee-yen; Lays Salim	6; 1	7^{7} 6^{5}
3	(Singapore) (Syria)	Lam Ju-min / Lim Yang-tat; Abdul-Rahim Salim / Salahuddin Tawil	6; 3	4; 6	6; 4

=== Bahrain vs. Singapore ===
Bahrain
2
Dubai Creek Golf & Yacht Club, Dubai, United Arab Emirates
16 April 1995

Singapore
1

			1	2	3
1	(Bahrain) (Singapore)	Esam Abdulaal; Lam Ju-min	6^{4} 7^{7}	6; 1	7; 5
2	(Bahrain) (Singapore)	Abdul-Latif Ahmed; Chen Chee-yen	6; 3	3; 6	2; 6
3	(Bahrain) (Singapore)	Esam Abdulaal / Nader Abdul-Aal; Lam Ju-min / Lim Yang-tat	6; 4	6; 4

=== Brunei vs. Kuwait ===
Brunei
0
Dubai Creek Golf & Yacht Club, Dubai, United Arab Emirates
16 April 1995

Kuwait
3

			1	2	3
1	(Brunei) (Kuwait)	Ismasufian Ibrahim; Hussain Al-Ashwak	6; 4	0; 6	4; 6
2	(Brunei) (Kuwait)	Awangku Salehuddin; Adel Al-Shatti	0; 6	2; 6
3	(Brunei) (Kuwait)	Chau Pheng-chai / Lim Oon-su; Adel Al-Shatti / Ahmed Taki	3; 6	4; 6

=== Oman vs. Syria ===
Oman
1
Dubai Creek Golf & Yacht Club, Dubai, United Arab Emirates
16 April 1995

Syria
2

			1	2	3
1	(Oman) (Syria)	Mudrik Al-Rawahi; Abdul-Rahim Salim	4; 6	6; 4	6; 2
2	(Oman) (Syria)	Barkat Salim Al-Sharji; Lays Salim	1; 6	1; 6
3	(Oman) (Syria)	Mudrik Al-Rawahi / Barkat Salim Al-Sharji; Lays Salim / Salahuddin Tawil	6^{1} 7^{7}	0; 6

== Group B ==
=== United Arab Emirates vs. Pacific Oceania ===
United Arab Emirates
0
Dubai Creek Golf & Yacht Club, Dubai, United Arab Emirates
12 April 1995

Pacific Oceania
3

			1	2	3
1	(United Arab Emirates) (Pacific Oceania)	Saeed Hasher Al-Maktoum; Lency Tenai	0; 6	2; 6
2	(United Arab Emirates) (Pacific Oceania)	Salim Dasmal; Motuliki Kailahi	2; 6	6; 4	3; 6
3	(United Arab Emirates) (Pacific Oceania)	Mohammed Saeed Al-Merri / Hadi Badri; Lency Tenai / Sanjeev Tikaram	1; 6	1; 6

=== Bangladesh vs. Jordan ===
Bangladesh
3
Dubai Creek Golf & Yacht Club, Dubai, United Arab Emirates
12 April 1995

Jordan
0

			1	2	3
1	(Bangladesh) (Jordan)	Hira Lal; Emad Abou Hamdeh	6; 4	6; 1
2	(Bangladesh) (Jordan)	Shovon Jamaly; Fares Azzouni	6; 3	6; 2
3	(Bangladesh) (Jordan)	Nawaz Ameen / Moinuddin Walliullah; Emad Abou Hamdeh / Khalid Hussaini	3; 6	7; 5	6; 1

=== Saudi Arabia vs. Lebanon ===
Saudi Arabia
2
Dubai Creek Golf & Yacht Club, Dubai, United Arab Emirates
12 April 1995

Lebanon
1

			1	2	3
1	(Saudi Arabia) (Lebanon)	Bader Mohammed Almuqail; Hussein Badreddine	6; 3	6; 1
2	(Saudi Arabia) (Lebanon)	Zulfiqar Ahmed; Toufiq Zhalan	4; 6	4; 6
3	(Saudi Arabia) (Lebanon)	Othman Al-Anazi / Bader Mohammed Almuqail; Hussein Badreddine / Karim El Khoury	6^{4} 7^{7}	7^{7} 6^{4}	6; 4

=== United Arab Emirates vs. Bangladesh ===
United Arab Emirates
0
Dubai Creek Golf & Yacht Club, Dubai, United Arab Emirates
13 April 1995

Bangladesh
3

			1	2	3
1	(United Arab Emirates) (Bangladesh)	Saeed Hasher Al-Maktoum; Hira Lal	0; 6	0; 6
2	(United Arab Emirates) (Bangladesh)	Salim Dasmal; Shovon Jamaly	1; 6	1; 6
3	(United Arab Emirates) (Bangladesh)	Mohammed Saeed Al-Merri / Hadi Badri; Nawaz Ameen / Moinuddin Walliullah	1; 6	0; 6

=== Jordan vs. Saudi Arabia ===
Jordan
0
Dubai Creek Golf & Yacht Club, Dubai, United Arab Emirates
13 April 1995

Saudi Arabia
3

			1	2	3
1	(Jordan) (Saudi Arabia)	Emad Abou Hamdeh; Bader Mohammed Almuqail	3; 6	6; 4	3; 6
2	(Jordan) (Saudi Arabia)	Fares Azzouni; Othman Al-Anazi	3; 6	2; 6
3	(Jordan) (Saudi Arabia)	Emad Abou Hamdeh / Khalid Hussaini; Zulfiqar Ahmed / Bader Mohammed Almuqail	2; 6	4; 6

=== Lebanon vs. Pacific Oceania ===
Lebanon
1
Dubai Creek Golf & Yacht Club, Dubai, United Arab Emirates
13 April 1995

Pacific Oceania
2

			1	2	3
1	(Lebanon) (Pacific Oceania)	Ibrahim Kahil; Lency Tenai	6; 2	5; 7	3; 6
2	(Lebanon) (Pacific Oceania)	Toufiq Zhalan; Motuliki Kailahi	6; 3	6; 3
3	(Lebanon) (Pacific Oceania)	Hussein Badreddine / Karim El Khoury; Motuliki Kailahi / Lency Tenai	7; 5	2; 6	4; 6

=== United Arab Emirates vs. Saudi Arabia ===
United Arab Emirates
1
Dubai Creek Golf & Yacht Club, Dubai, United Arab Emirates
14 April 1995

Saudi Arabia
2

			1	2	3
1	(United Arab Emirates) (Saudi Arabia)	Saeed Hasher Al-Maktoum; Farah Al-Somali	6; 4	7^{9} 6^{7}
2	(United Arab Emirates) (Saudi Arabia)	Salim Dasmal; Zulfiqar Ahmed	4; 6	0; 6
3	(United Arab Emirates) (Saudi Arabia)	Hadi Badri / Salim Dasmal; Othman Al-Anazi / Bader Mohammed Almuqail	1; 6	3; 6

=== Bangladesh vs. Pacific Oceania ===
Bangladesh
2
Dubai Creek Golf & Yacht Club, Dubai, United Arab Emirates
14 April 1995

Pacific Oceania
1

			1	2	3
1	(Bangladesh) (Pacific Oceania)	Hira Lal; Lency Tenai	4; 6	6; 4	6; 1
2	(Bangladesh) (Pacific Oceania)	Shovon Jamaly; Motuliki Kailahi	6; 3	6; 0
3	(Bangladesh) (Pacific Oceania)	Nawaz Ameen / Moinuddin Walliullah; Motuliki Kailahi / Lency Tenai	6; 3	2; 6	3; 6

=== Jordan vs. Lebanon ===
Jordan
1
Dubai Creek Golf & Yacht Club, Dubai, United Arab Emirates
14 April 1995

Lebanon
2

			1	2	3
1	(Jordan) (Lebanon)	Emad Abou Hamdeh; Ibrahim Kahil	6^{3} 7^{7}	6; 3	4; 6
2	(Jordan) (Lebanon)	Fares Azzouni; Toufiq Zhalan	6; 3	7^{8} 6^{6}
3	(Jordan) (Lebanon)	Emad Abou Hamdeh / Khalid Hussaini; Hussein Badreddine / Karim El Khoury	2; 6	6^{2} 7^{7}

=== United Arab Emirates vs. Lebanon ===
United Arab Emirates
0
Dubai Creek Golf & Yacht Club, Dubai, United Arab Emirates
15 April 1995

Lebanon
3

			1	2	3
1	(United Arab Emirates) (Lebanon)	Saeed Hasher Al-Maktoum; Ibrahim Kahil	4; 6	4; 6
2	(United Arab Emirates) (Lebanon)	Salim Dasmal; Toufiq Zhalan	2; 6	0; 6
3	(United Arab Emirates) (Lebanon)	Saeed Hasher Al-Maktoum / Mohammed Saeed Al-Merri; Hussein Badreddine / Karim El Khoury	2; 6	1; 6

=== Bangladesh vs. Saudi Arabia ===
Bangladesh
0
Dubai Creek Golf & Yacht Club, Dubai, United Arab Emirates
15 April 1995

Saudi Arabia
3

			1	2	3
1	(Bangladesh) (Saudi Arabia)	Hira Lal; Bader Mohammed Almuqail	2; 6	0; 6
2	(Bangladesh) (Saudi Arabia)	Shovon Jamaly; Zulfiqar Ahmed	6^{5} 7^{7}	1; 6
3	(Bangladesh) (Saudi Arabia)	Nawaz Ameen / Moinuddin Walliullah; Othman Al-Anazi / Bader Mohammed Almuqail	6^{7} 7^{9}	2; 6

=== Jordan vs. Pacific Oceania ===
Jordan
0
Dubai Creek Golf & Yacht Club, Dubai, United Arab Emirates
15 April 1995

Pacific Oceania
3

			1	2	3
1	(Jordan) (Pacific Oceania)	Khalid Hussaini; Lency Tenai	3; 6	2; 6
2	(Jordan) (Pacific Oceania)	Fares Azzouni; Motuliki Kailahi	6; 1	2; 6	2; 6
3	(Jordan) (Pacific Oceania)	Khalid Hussaini / Khaled Naffa; Motuliki Kailahi / Lency Tenai	3; 6	3; 6

=== United Arab Emirates vs. Jordan ===
United Arab Emirates
1
Dubai Creek Golf & Yacht Club, Dubai, United Arab Emirates
16 April 1995

Jordan
2

			1	2	3
1	(United Arab Emirates) (Jordan)	Hadi Badri; Emad Abou Hamdeh	0; 6	0; 6
2	(United Arab Emirates) (Jordan)	Saeed Hasher Al-Maktoum; Fares Azzouni	6; 4	6; 3
3	(United Arab Emirates) (Jordan)	Mohammed Saeed Al-Merri / Salim Dasmal; Emad Abou Hamdeh / Khalid Hussaini	4; 6	5; 7

=== Bangladesh vs. Lebanon ===
Bangladesh
2
Dubai Creek Golf & Yacht Club, Dubai, United Arab Emirates
16 April 1995

Lebanon
1

			1	2	3
1	(Bangladesh) (Lebanon)	Hira Lal; Ibrahim Kahil	6; 2	6; 3
2	(Bangladesh) (Lebanon)	Shovon Jamaly; Toufiq Zhalan	6; 3	6; 3
3	(Bangladesh) (Lebanon)	Nawaz Ameen / Moinuddin Walliullah; Hussein Badreddine / Karim El Khoury	2; 6	5; 7

=== Saudi Arabia vs. Pacific Oceania ===
Saudi Arabia
2
Dubai Creek Golf & Yacht Club, Dubai, United Arab Emirates
16 April 1995

Pacific Oceania
1

			1	2	3
1	(Saudi Arabia) (Pacific Oceania)	Bader Mohammed Almuqail; Lency Tenai	4; 6	6; 2	7; 5
2	(Saudi Arabia) (Pacific Oceania)	Othman Al-Anazi; Motuliki Kailahi	7^{7} 6^{3}	7; 5
3	(Saudi Arabia) (Pacific Oceania)	Othman Al-Anazi / Bader Mohammed Almuqail; Motuliki Kailahi / Lency Tenai	6; 3	1; 6	1; 6
