= Liew Chuan Fue =

Bruneian footballer

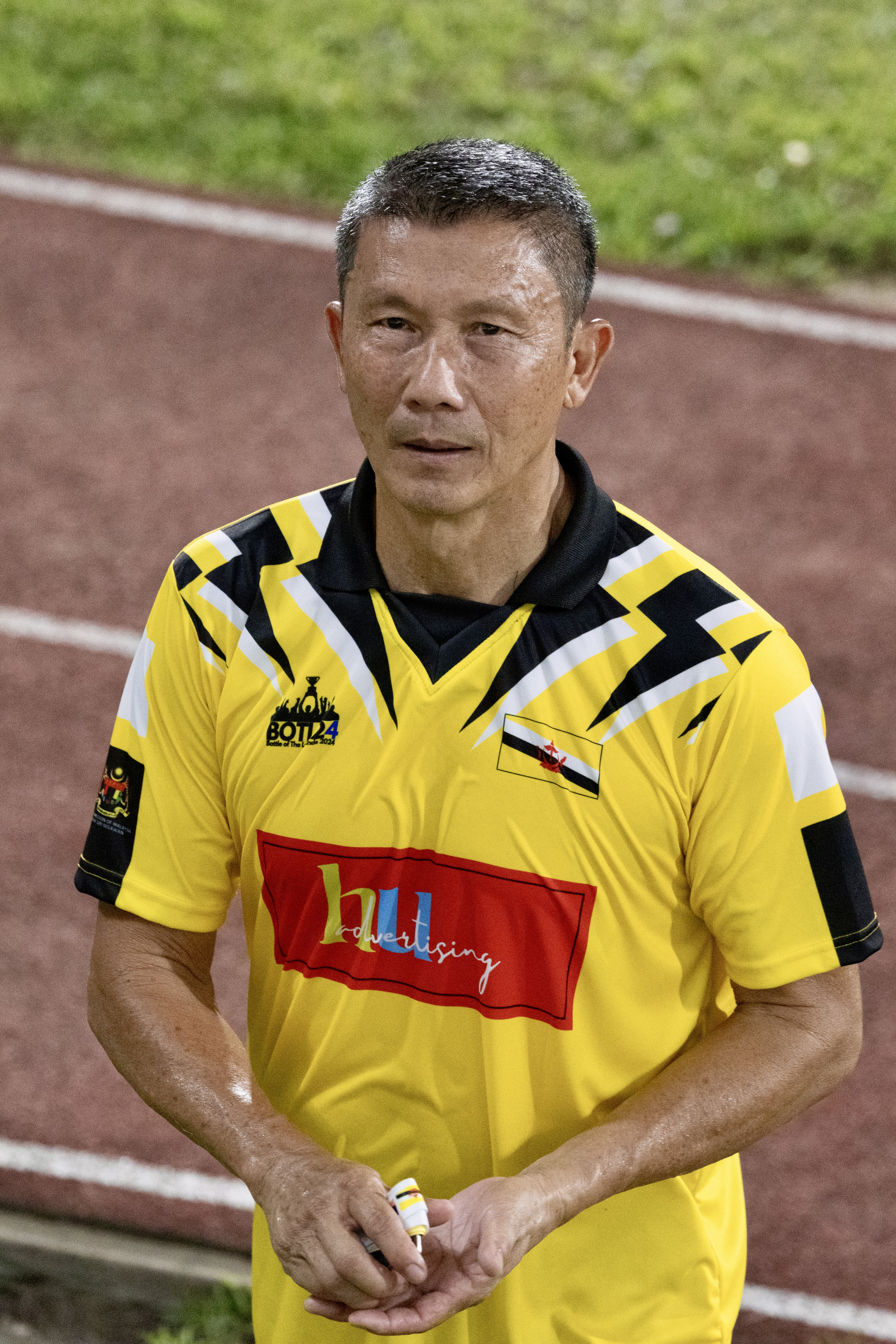

Personal information
- Full name: Liew Chuan Fue
- Date of birth: 9 November 1962 (age 63)
- Place of birth: Brunei
- Position: Defender

Senior career*
Years	Team	Apps	(Gls)
- Kota Ranger
1988–1999	Brunei		
2001	DPMM		

International career^{‡}
1989–1998	Brunei	10+	(0+)

Managerial career
- 2011: Brunei U18
- 2013: Brunei U15
- * Club domestic league appearances and goals as of 29 August 2025 ‡ National team caps and goals as of 29 August 2025

Liew Chuan Fue (born 9 November 1962) is a Bruneian former footballer and coach who played as a defender. He was the captain of the Bruneian representative team playing in the Malaysian leagues (Liga Semi-Pro and Liga Perdana Malaysia) in the nineties. His last match for the Wasps was the 1999 Malaysia Cup final where he famously lifted the trophy at Stadium Merdeka after a 2–1 victory, etching his name as one of the greatest players to have ever worn the yellow jersey.

== Club career ==
Liew is an art teacher who started playing for the Brunei team that participated in the Malaysian football leagues since 1979, beginning with the 1988 Liga Malaysia. Brunei were minnows in the league and played in the second tier from 1989 to 1994, when the top tier was expanded like before, and the Wasps occupied the bottom place that season. The final fixture was a game to remember for the wrong reasons, as Singapore clinched the title at Bandar Seri Begawan in an ill-tempered match where Zul Iskandar Abdullah, Rosli Liman and Rosaidi Kamis saw red for the home team.

Brunei football took a dramatic upturn in 1996 with the appointment of David Booth. The English tactician honed the skills of Liew, already the captain of the Wasps at that point, as well as seasoned campaigners like Rosanan Samak, Irwan Mohammad, Ali Momin and Ali Mustafa. Liew captained Brunei to consecutive fifth-place finishes as well as semi-final appearances in the Malaysia Cup in 1996 and 1997, a far cry from being a rock-bottom side just a few years ago.

In the 1998 season, Brunei achieved their highest-ever league position in third place. Their 1–1 draw against Pahang on the last matchday on 1 August denied their opposition the league championship, as their contenders Penang won on the same day against Selangor via a last minute strike by Merzagua Abderrazak, pipping Pahang to the title by one point. Brunei subsequently missed out on the Malaysia Cup semi-final as they had finished below the top two in the group phase.

Liew's last and most meaningful season with the Brunei team was in 1999. Playing alongside two up-and-coming defenders Norsillmy Taha and Sallehuddin Damit, Brunei endured a slow start with four defeats in a row. A rally in the latter stage of the league saw them finish seventh, needing to qualify for the Malaysia Cup via the playoffs. After negotiating the playoffs they became top of their Malaysia Cup group, setting up a semi-final showdown against Negri Sembilan. Liew shut down the opposition 3–0 in the first leg at Bandar Seri Begawan which proved pivotal in the tie as they lost 3–1 in the return leg, but advanced to the final 4–3 on aggregate, setting up a final against Sarawak in a Borneo Island derby on 4 December. A brace by Rosli Liman sealed a famous win for Brunei, which to this day is still regarded as the nation's greatest football achievement. By lifting the Malaysia Cup, it was a fitting end to a decade-long playing career with the Wasps for the 38-year-old Liew.

Liew played for Prince Al-Muhtadee Billah's newly-formed team DPMM FC at the Pepsi Cup in 2001. They went all the way to the final where they were beaten by Kasuka FC 3–1.

== International career ==
Liew made his international debut at the 15th SEA Games held in Malaysia, against Indonesia on 21 August 1989. Up against the previous gold medalists, Brunei lost 6–0. It was not to be a fruitless tournament for the Wasps as they managed to beat the Philippines 2–0 in their final group game four days later.

As Brunei did not enter the World Cup, Asian Cup nor the 1991 SEA Games football tournament, Liew's next international outing was the 17th SEA Games in Singapore. In the first game on 7 June, Brunei produced a late rally from 3–0 down but could not find the equalising goal against Laos, which finished 3–2. They made a good account of themselves in the next two games despite their losses, keeping level with the Malaysians until the 87th minute in their second fixture, then managing to score twice against the mighty Thailand just two days later. The Wasps finally capitulated 6–0 against Myanmar in the final round, finishing bottom of their group.

In the next SEA Games in 1995, Brunei started well, managing a 2–2 draw against Singapore. Unfortunately they narrowly lost the rest of their games to finish bottom yet again.

Liew was the skipper for Brunei at the inaugural 1996 AFF Championship where in their first game, they were down 2–0 to Singapore from the third minute, the captain himself conceding a penalty for a foul on Steven Tan. However they kept the Lions at bay from that point, resulting in only a 3–0 defeat. After being thrashed 6–0 by eventual winners Thailand, Brunei finally registered a win against the Philippines through Irwan Mohammad's solitary goal near the half-hour mark on 8 September. They would finish in fourth spot after losing 6–0 to Malaysia, who needed a win and better hosts Singapore's result against Thailand.

Despite brilliant form at club competition, the Brunei team without Brian Bothwell and Raphaël Patron Akakpo faltered at the 1997 SEA Games in Indonesia, losing all four group matches including a 0–1 defeat to Singapore in their last fixture.

== Coaching career ==
As a football coach, Liew took charge of various national youth teams including the under-18s in 2011, and also the under-15 squad in 2013.

== Honours ==
=== Team ===
Brunei (Liga Premier team)

- Malaysia Cup: 1999

DPMM

- Pepsi Cup: 2001 (runner-up)

=== Individual ===
- Meritorious Service Medal (PJK; 13 December 1999)
- IFFHS Brunei All Time Dream Team: 2021
