= 1994 Davis Cup Asia/Oceania Zone Group III =

International tennis competition

The Asia/Oceania Zone was one of the three zones of the regional Davis Cup competition in 1994.

In the Asia/Oceania Zone there were three different tiers, called groups, in which teams competed against each other to advance to the upper tier. Winners in Group III advanced to the Asia/Oceania Zone Group II in 1995. All other teams remained in Group III.

== Participating nations ==
- Bahrain
- Bangladesh
- Brunei
- Jordan
- Kuwait
- Lebanon
- Oman
- Qatar
- Syria
- United Arab Emirates
- Uzbekistan

=== Draw ===
- Venue: Khalifa International Tennis and Squash Complex, Doha, Qatar
- Date: 6–10 April

Group A

	UZB	LIB	BHR	JOR	BRU	RR; W–L	Match; W–L	Set; W–L	Standings
Uzbekistan		3–0	3–0	3–0	3–0	4–0	12–0 (100%)	24–0 (100%)	1
Lebanon	0–3		2–1	3–0	2–1	3–1	7–5 (58%)	15–12 (56%)	2
Bahrain	0–3	1–2		2–1	3–0	2–2	6–6 (50%)	14–10 (58%)	3
Jordan	0–3	0–3	1–2		3–0	1–3	4–8 (33%)	7–17 (29%)	4
Brunei	0–3	1–2	0–3	0–3		0–4	1–11 (8%)	2–23 (8%)	5

Group B

	QAT	KUW	BAN	SYR	UAE	OMA	RR; W–L	Match; W–L	Set; W–L	Standings
Qatar		2–1	2–1	2–1	3–0	3–0	5–0	12–3 (80%)	27–7 (79%)	1
Kuwait	1–2		3–0	3–0	3–0	3–0	4–1	13–2 (87%)	27–5 (84%)	2
Bangladesh	1–2	0–3		2–1	2–1	3–0	3–2	8–7 (53%)	17–17 (50%)	3
Syria	1–2	0–3	1–2		3–0	2–1	2–3	7–8 (47%)	14–19 (42%)	4
United Arab Emirates	0–3	0–3	1–2	0–3		2–1	1–4	3–12 (20%)	8–24 (25%)	5
Oman	0–3	0–3	0–3	1–2	1–2		0–5	2–13 (13%)	5–26 (16%)	6

- Uzbekistan and Qatar promoted to Group II in 1995.

== Group A ==
=== Bahrain vs. Brunei ===
Bahrain
3
Khalifa International Tennis and Squash Complex, Doha, Qatar
6 April 1994

Brunei
0

			1	2	3
1	(Bahrain) (Brunei)	Esam Abdulaal; Awangku Salehuddin	6; 0	6; 1
2	(Bahrain) (Brunei)	Hesham Malalla; Ismasufian Ibrahim	6; 3	6; 3
3	(Bahrain) (Brunei)	Nader Abdul-Aal / Shehab Shehab; Bin-Latif Isa / Zulkifli Shamsol	6; 2	6; 0

=== Jordan vs. Lebanon ===
Jordan
0
Khalifa International Tennis and Squash Complex, Doha, Qatar
6 April 1994

Lebanon
3

			1	2	3
1	(Jordan) (Lebanon)	Samir Refa'a; Hussein Badreddine	1; 6	2; 6
2	(Jordan) (Lebanon)	Laith Azzouni; Karim El Khoury	6^{4} 7^{7}	3; 6
3	(Jordan) (Lebanon)	Laith Azzouni / Laith Kurdi; Amine Khalaf / Toufiq Zhalan	6^{3} 7^{7}	7; 5	6; 8

=== Bahrain vs. Uzbekistan ===
Bahrain
0
Khalifa International Tennis and Squash Complex, Doha, Qatar
7 April 1994

Uzbekistan
3

			1	2	3
1	(Bahrain) (Uzbekistan)	Esam Abdulaal; Dmitri Tomashevich	2; 6	1; 6
2	(Bahrain) (Uzbekistan)	Hesham Malalla; Oleg Ogorodov	1; 6	1; 6
3	(Bahrain) (Uzbekistan)	Nader Abdul-Aal / Shehab Shehab; Oleg Ogorodov / Dmitri Tomashevich	1; 6	1; 6

=== Brunei vs. Jordan ===
Brunei
0
Khalifa International Tennis and Squash Complex, Doha, Qatar
7 April 1994

Jordan
3

			1	2	3
1	(Brunei) (Jordan)	Zulkifli Shamsol; Laith Kurdi	1; 6	4; 6
2	(Brunei) (Jordan)	Ismasufian Ibrahim; Laith Azzouni	2; 6	4; 6
3	(Brunei) (Jordan)	Bin-Latif Isa / Zulkifli Shamsol; Samir Refa'a / Kawar Wadie	3; 6	6^{5} 7^{7}

=== Bahrain vs. Lebanon ===
Bahrain
1
Khalifa International Tennis and Squash Complex, Doha, Qatar
8 April 1994

Lebanon
2

			1	2	3
1	(Bahrain) (Lebanon)	Esam Abdulaal; Toufiq Zhalan	6; 1	6; 2
2	(Bahrain) (Lebanon)	Hesham Malalla; Karim El Khoury	0; 6	2; 6
3	(Bahrain) (Lebanon)	Esam Abdulaal / Nader Abdul-Aal; Hussein Badreddine / Karim El Khoury	6; 4	4; 6	4; 6

=== Brunei vs. Uzbekistan ===
Brunei
0
Khalifa International Tennis and Squash Complex, Doha, Qatar
8 April 1994

Uzbekistan
3

			1	2	3
1	(Brunei) (Uzbekistan)	Zulkifli Shamsol; Dmitri Tomashevich	2; 6	0; 6
2	(Brunei) (Uzbekistan)	Ismasufian Ibrahim; Oleg Ogorodov	1; 6	2; 6
3	(Brunei) (Uzbekistan)	Ismasufian Ibrahim / Awangku Salehuddin; Timur Ganiev / Farhad Gulyamov	2; 6	2; 6

=== Bahrain vs. Jordan ===
Bahrain
2
Khalifa International Tennis and Squash Complex, Doha, Qatar
9 April 1994

Jordan
1

			1	2	3
1	(Bahrain) (Jordan)	Shehab Shehab; Laith Kurdi	6; 3	3; 1		retired
2	(Bahrain) (Jordan)	Esam Abdulaal; Laith Azzouni	6; 1	6; 1
3	(Bahrain) (Jordan)	Esam Abdulaal / Nader Abdul-Aal; Laith Azzouni / Laith Kurdi	6; 2	6; 1

=== Lebanon vs. Uzbekistan ===
Lebanon
0
Khalifa International Tennis and Squash Complex, Doha, Qatar
9 April 1994

Uzbekistan
3

			1	2	3
1	(Lebanon) (Uzbekistan)	Hussein Badreddine; Dmitri Tomashevich	2; 6	1; 6
2	(Lebanon) (Uzbekistan)	Karim El Khoury; Oleg Ogorodov	1; 6	2; 6
3	(Lebanon) (Uzbekistan)	Karim El Khoury / Amine Khalaf; Oleg Ogorodov / Dmitri Tomashevich	1; 6	2; 6

=== Brunei vs. Lebanon ===
Brunei
1
Khalifa International Tennis and Squash Complex, Doha, Qatar
10 April 1994

Lebanon
2

			1	2	3
1	(Brunei) (Lebanon)	Zulkifli Shamsol; Toufiq Zhalan	3; 6	0; 6
2	(Brunei) (Lebanon)	Ismasufian Ibrahim; Amine Khalaf	4; 6	6; 3	6; 4
3	(Brunei) (Lebanon)	Ismasufian Ibrahim / Awangku Salehuddin; Hussein Badreddine / Karim El Khoury	3; 6	1; 6

=== Jordan vs. Uzbekistan ===
Jordan
0
Khalifa International Tennis and Squash Complex, Doha, Qatar
10 April 1994

Uzbekistan
3

			1	2	3
1	(Jordan) (Uzbekistan)	Laith Kurdi; Timur Ganiev	0; 6	0; 6
2	(Jordan) (Uzbekistan)	Laith Azzouni; Dmitri Tomashevich	1; 6	1; 6
3	(Jordan) (Uzbekistan)	Laith Azzouni / Samir Refa'a; Farhad Gulyamov / Oleg Ogorodov	1; 6	1; 6

== Group B ==
=== Bangladesh vs. Qatar ===
Bangladesh
1
Khalifa International Tennis and Squash Complex, Doha, Qatar
6 April 1994

Qatar
2

			1	2	3
1	(Bangladesh) (Qatar)	Moinuddin Walliullah; Cesarito Diong	6^{8} 7^{10}	6; 3	1; 6
2	(Bangladesh) (Qatar)	Hira Lal; Sultan Al-Alawi	3; 6	5; 7
3	(Bangladesh) (Qatar)	Nawaz Ameen / Faisal-Syed Haq; Sultan Al-Alawi / Nasser Al-Khelaifi	6; 2	6; 0

=== Kuwait vs. Syria ===
Kuwait
3
Khalifa International Tennis and Squash Complex, Doha, Qatar
6 April 1994

Syria
0

			1	2	3
1	(Kuwait) (Syria)	Adel Al-Shatti; Rabi Bouhassoun	6; 2	6; 3
2	(Kuwait) (Syria)	Aymen-Ibrahim Al-Ashwak; Abdul-Rahim Salim	6; 3	6; 4
3	(Kuwait) (Syria)	Aymen-Ibrahim Al-Ashwak / Adel Al-Shatti; Rabi Bouhassoun / Kahtan Malki	6; 0	6; 3

=== Oman vs. United Arab Emirates ===
Oman
1
Khalifa International Tennis and Squash Complex, Doha, Qatar
6 April 1994

United Arab Emirates
2

			1	2	3
1	(Oman) (United Arab Emirates)	Hamood Salim Al-Moamari; Manuel Gayon	0; 6	0; 6
2	(Oman) (United Arab Emirates)	Mudrik Al-Rawahi; Othman Al-Ulama	6; 3	6; 2
3	(Oman) (United Arab Emirates)	Hamood Salim Al-Moamari / Mudrik Al-Rawahi; Mohammed Saeed Al-Merri / Manuel Gayon	3; 6	3; 6

=== Bangladesh vs. Kuwait ===
Bangladesh
0
Khalifa International Tennis and Squash Complex, Doha, Qatar
7 April 1994

Kuwait
3

			1	2	3
1	(Bangladesh) (Kuwait)	Faisal-Syed Haq; Adel Al-Shatti	3; 6	2; 6
2	(Bangladesh) (Kuwait)	Hira Lal; Aymen-Ibrahim Al-Ashwak	3; 6	2; 6
3	(Bangladesh) (Kuwait)	Nawaz Ameen / Faisal-Syed Haq; Aymen-Ibrahim Al-Ashwak / Adel Al-Shatti	4; 6	7^{7} 6^{2}	0; 6

=== Oman vs. Syria ===
Oman
1
Khalifa International Tennis and Squash Complex, Doha, Qatar
7 April 1994

Syria
2

			1	2	3
1	(Oman) (Syria)	Hamood Salim Al-Moamari; Fadi Chanko	2; 6	1; 6
2	(Oman) (Syria)	Mudrik Al-Rawahi; Kahtan Malki	6; 4	6; 3
3	(Oman) (Syria)	Hamood Salim Al-Moamari / Mudrik Al-Rawahi; Fadi Chanko / Abdul-Rahim Salim	5; 7	3; 6

=== Qatar vs. United Arab Emirates ===
Qatar
3
Khalifa International Tennis and Squash Complex, Doha, Qatar
7 April 1994

United Arab Emirates
0

			1	2	3
1	(Qatar) (United Arab Emirates)	Cesarito Diong; Manuel Gayon	6^{8} 7^{10}	6; 4	6; 4
2	(Qatar) (United Arab Emirates)	Sultan Al-Alawi; Othman Al-Ulama	6; 0	6; 2
3	(Qatar) (United Arab Emirates)	Sultan Al-Alawi / Mohammed Ali Al-Saoud; Mohammed Saeed Al-Merri / Sina-Mahmoud Kazim	7; 5	6; 1

=== Bangladesh vs. United Arab Emirates ===
Bangladesh
2
Khalifa International Tennis and Squash Complex, Doha, Qatar
8 April 1994

United Arab Emirates
1

			1	2	3
1	(Bangladesh) (United Arab Emirates)	Faisal-Syed Haq; Sina-Mahmoud Kazim	6; 0	6; 0
2	(Bangladesh) (United Arab Emirates)	Hira Lal; Manuel Gayon	4; 6	3; 6
3	(Bangladesh) (United Arab Emirates)	Nawaz Ameen / Faisal-Syed Haq; Mohammed Saeed Al-Merri / Manuel Gayon	7; 5	7^{7} 6^{3}

=== Kuwait vs. Oman ===
Kuwait
3
Khalifa International Tennis and Squash Complex, Doha, Qatar
8 April 1994

Oman
0

			1	2	3
1	(Kuwait) (Oman)	Adel Al-Shatti; Mohammed Ibrahim Al-Balushi	6; 1	6; 0
2	(Kuwait) (Oman)	Aymen-Ibrahim Al-Ashwak; Mudrik Al-Rawahi	6; 4	6; 3
3	(Kuwait) (Oman)	Abdullah Abdul-Aziz / Khaled Ashkanani; Hamood Salim Al-Moamari / Mudrik Al-Rawahi	6; 0	6; 2

=== Qatar vs. Syria ===
Qatar
2
Khalifa International Tennis and Squash Complex, Doha, Qatar
8 April 1994

Syria
1

			1	2	3
1	(Qatar) (Syria)	Cesarito Diong; Rabi Bouhassoun	6; 1	6; 3
2	(Qatar) (Syria)	Sultan Al-Alawi; Fadi Chanko	6; 3	6; 1
3	(Qatar) (Syria)	Nasser Al-Khelaifi / Mohammed Ali Al-Saoud; Rabi Bouhassoun / Abdul-Rahim Salim	3; 6	6; 4	3; 6

=== Bangladesh vs. Oman ===
Bangladesh
3
Khalifa International Tennis and Squash Complex, Doha, Qatar
9 April 1994

Oman
0

			1	2	3
1	(Bangladesh) (Oman)	Nawaz Ameen; Saeed Mohammed Al-Mahroki	6; 2	6; 0
2	(Bangladesh) (Oman)	Faisal-Syed Haq; Mudrik Al-Rawahi	1; 6	6; 0	6; 4
3	(Bangladesh) (Oman)	Faisal-Syed Haq / Moinuddin Walliullah; Saeed Mohammed Al-Mahroki / Hamood Salim Al-Moamari	6; 2	6; 0

=== Kuwait vs. Qatar ===
Kuwait
1
Khalifa International Tennis and Squash Complex, Doha, Qatar
9 April 1994

Qatar
2

			1	2	3
1	(Kuwait) (Qatar)	Adel Al-Shatti; Cesarito Diong	4; 6	6; 4	5; 7
2	(Kuwait) (Qatar)	Aymen-Ibrahim Al-Ashwak; Sultan Al-Alawi	7^{9} 6^{7}	6; 3
3	(Kuwait) (Qatar)	Aymen-Ibrahim Al-Ashwak / Adel Al-Shatti; Sultan Al-Alawi / Cesarito Diong	2; 6	6^{2} 7^{7}

=== Syria vs. United Arab Emirates ===
Syria
3
Khalifa International Tennis and Squash Complex, Doha, Qatar
9 April 1994

United Arab Emirates
0

			1	2	3
1	(Syria) (United Arab Emirates)	Kahtan Malki; Sina-Mahmoud Kazim	6; 2	6; 0
2	(Syria) (United Arab Emirates)	Abdul-Rahim Salim; Othman Al-Ulama	7; 5	6; 4
3	(Syria) (United Arab Emirates)	Rabi Bouhassoun / Abdul-Rahim Salim; Mohammed Saeed Al-Merri / Othman Al-Ulama	6; 1	4; 6	6; 2

=== Bangladesh vs. Syria ===
Bangladesh
2
Khalifa International Tennis and Squash Complex, Doha, Qatar
10 April 1994

Syria
1

			1	2	3
1	(Bangladesh) (Syria)	Nawaz Ameen; Rabi Bouhassoun	6^{3} 7^{7}	6; 2	2; 6
2	(Bangladesh) (Syria)	Moinuddin Walliullah; Fadi Chanko	6; 2	6; 1
3	(Bangladesh) (Syria)	Nawaz Ameen / Faisal-Syed Haq; Kahtan Malki / Abdul-Rahim Salim	6; 3	7; 5

=== Kuwait vs. United Arab Emirates ===
Kuwait
3
Khalifa International Tennis and Squash Complex, Doha, Qatar
10 April 1994

United Arab Emirates
0

			1	2	3
1	(Kuwait) (United Arab Emirates)	Adel Al-Shatti; Mohammed Saeed Al-Merri	6; 2	6; 3
2	(Kuwait) (United Arab Emirates)	Aymen-Ibrahim Al-Ashwak; Othman Al-Ulama	6; 0	6; 0
3	(Kuwait) (United Arab Emirates)	Abdullah Abdul-Aziz / Khaled Ashkanani; Mohammed Saeed Al-Merri / Sina-Mahmoud Kazim	6; 2	6; 0

=== Oman vs. Qatar ===
Oman
0
Khalifa International Tennis and Squash Complex, Doha, Qatar
10 April 1994

Qatar
3

			1	2	3
1	(Oman) (Qatar)	Mohammed Ibrahim Al-Balushi; Cesarito Diong	1; 6	0; 6
2	(Oman) (Qatar)	Mudrik Al-Rawahi; Sultan Al-Alawi	3; 6	0; 6
3	(Oman) (Qatar)	Hamood Salim Al-Moamari / Mudrik Al-Rawahi; Sultan Al-Alawi / Mohammed Ali Al-Saoud	2; 6	3; 6
