= Rosli Liman =

Bruneian footballer

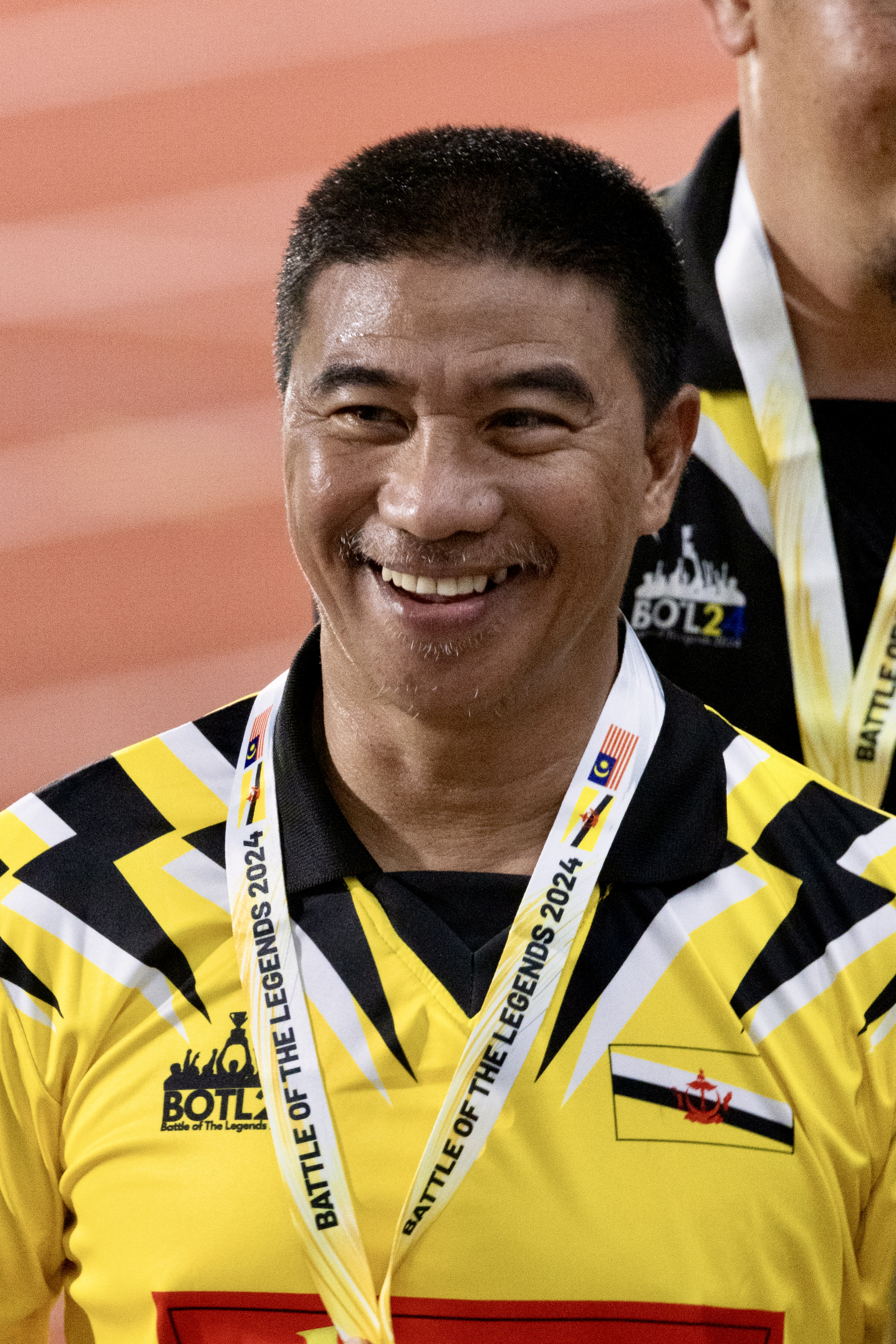
- Rosli in 2024

Personal information
- Full name: Rosli bin Haji Liman
- Date of birth: 12 May 1969 (age 57)
- Place of birth: Lorong Sekuna, Kampong Ayer, Brunei
- Position: Midfielder

Senior career*
Years	Team	Apps	(Gls)
1988–2000	Brunei		
- Indera

International career^{‡}
1988–2000	Brunei	7+	(1+)
- * Club domestic league appearances and goals as of 12 October 2020 ‡ National team caps and goals as of 28 March 2016

Rosli bin Haji Liman (born 12 May 1969) is a retired Brunei international footballer who played for the Brunei M-League representative team as a midfielder.

== Club career ==
Having appeared for the Wasps since 1988, Rosli was one of the mainstays of the Brunei M-League team in the nineties along with the two keepers Yunos and Ibrahim Abu Bakar, centre-back Liew Chuan Fue and Rosanan Samak. He was the engine of the team and his late runs from midfield contributed goals to a modestly-performing Brunei side that was often faced with adversity. This was outlined in FIFA 192: The True Story Behind the Legend of Brunei Darussalam National Football Team, a book by British author Stanley Park. At club level, he was on Indera SC's books.

On 4 December 1999, Rosli scored twice in the final of the Malaysia Cup, winning Brunei's first silverware in 20 years since joining the Malaysian leagues. His brace was notable not only for its significance to Bruneian football but that he had not scored all season and the winner came as Sarawak's equalising goal by Ramles Sari was still being announced.

Rosli played for one more season with a depleted Brunei side that was relegated to Premier Two, but was forced to retire at 30 years of age due to a recurring knee problem.

== International career ==
Rosli played in all four group matches at the 1999 SEA Games held in his country Brunei. His last appearances for the Brunei national team came at the 2000 AFC Asian Cup qualifying round.

== Honours ==
Brunei

- Malaysia Cup: 1999

Individual

- Meritorious Service Medal (PJK; 13 December 1999)
- IFFHS Brunei All Time Dream Team: 2021
