= Dubai Creek Golf & Yacht Club =

Golf and yacht club in Dubai, United Arab Emirates

Coordinates: 25.2416922°N 55.3333163°E

Dubai Creek Golf & Yacht Club first opened in Dubai, UAE, in 1993, comprising an 18-hole par 71 championship golf course with a distinctively sail-shaped clubhouse. It was home to the first golf academy in the Middle East. The clubhouse comprises a number of function rooms as well as changing facilities and a number of restaurants. It is situated in the heart of the city, on the Deira side of Dubai Creek.

The course has hosted the annual Dubai Invitational on the European Tour since 2024. Previously, it hosted the Dubai Desert Classic in 1999 and 2000. The course record of 62 is held by Rory McIlroy.

The yacht club is based in a separate building. The development was designed by British architect Brian Johnson and intended to evoke an Arabian tent.

The 180-room boutique Park Hyatt Hotel sits between the two buildings and the grounds of the Creek Golf & Yacht Club are also home to the 92 villas that comprise the Dubai Creek Club Residences.

The Dubai Creek Golf & Yacht Club is also home to the city's only seaplane tour operator, Seawings.

Dubai Creek Golf Club hosted the World Golf Awards in October 2020. The awards serve to celebrate and reward excellence in golf tourism. In 2005 Dubai Creek was named in Golf World’s Top 100 Golf Courses in the World.
