= 2002 Davis Cup Asia/Oceania Zone Group IV =

International tennis competition

The Group IV tournament was held March 20–24, in Dhaka, Bangladesh, on outdoor hard courts.

== Format ==
The eight teams were split into two groups and played in a round-robin format. The top two teams of each group advanced to the promotion pool, from which the two top teams were promoted to the Asia/Oceania Zone Group III in 2003. The bottom two teams of each group were placed in a second pool to determine places 5–8.

== Pool A ==
| Team | Pld | W | L | MF | MA |
|---|---|---|---|---|---|
| Kyrgyzstan | 3 | 3 | 0 | 7 | 2 |
| Bahrain | 3 | 2 | 1 | 5 | 4 |
| Iraq | 3 | 1 | 2 | 5 | 4 |
| Brunei | 3 | 0 | 3 | 1 | 8 |

=== Bahrain vs. Brunei ===
Bahrain
2
National Centre, Dhaka, Bangladesh
20 March 2002

Brunei
1

| | | | 1 | 2 | 3 |
|---|---|---|---|---|---|
| 1 | (Bahrain) (Brunei) | Abdul-Rahman Shehab; Chok-Kah Rui | 6; 3 | 6; 1 |
| 2 | (Bahrain) (Brunei) | Esam Abdulaal; Wong-Kee Loong | 6; 0 | 6; 1 |
| 3 | (Bahrain) (Brunei) | Omar-Mohammed Ahmed / Saeed Ismail; Wong-Kee Loong / Chok-Kah Rui | 6; 3 | 4; 6 | 1; 6 |

=== Kyrgyzstan vs. Iraq ===
Kyrgyzstan
2
National Centre, Dhaka, Bangladesh
20 March 2002

Iraq
1

| | | | 1 | 2 | 3 |
|---|---|---|---|---|---|
| 1 | (Kyrgyzstan) (Iraq) | Ruslan Eshmuhamedov; Saddam-Hussain Kadhim | 5; 7 | 3; 6 |
| 2 | (Kyrgyzstan) (Iraq) | Eduard Koifman; Kadhim Kadhim | 6; 4 | 5; 7 | 6; 1 |
| 3 | (Kyrgyzstan) (Iraq) | Ruslan Eshmuhamedov / Eduard Koifman; Haidar Kadhim / Hussain Rasheed | 4; 6 | 6; 1 | 7; 5 |

=== Bahrain vs. Kyrgyzstan ===
Bahrain
1
National Centre, Dhaka, Bangladesh
21 March 2002

Kyrgyzstan
2

| | | | 1 | 2 | 3 |
|---|---|---|---|---|---|
| 1 | (Bahrain) (Kyrgyzstan) | Abdul-Rahman Shehab; Ruslan Eshmuhamedov | 3; 6 | 6^{7} 7^{9} |
| 2 | (Bahrain) (Kyrgyzstan) | Esam Abdulaal; Eduard Koifman | 0; 6 | 4; 6 |
| 3 | (Bahrain) (Kyrgyzstan) | Saeed Ismail / Abdul-Rahman Shehab; Ernest Batirbekov / Ilia Sazonov | 6; 0 | 6; 1 |

=== Brunei vs. Iraq ===
Brunei
0
National Centre, Dhaka, Bangladesh
21 March 2002

Iraq
3

| | | | 1 | 2 | 3 |
|---|---|---|---|---|---|
| 1 | (Brunei) (Iraq) | Chok-Kah Rui; Haidar Kadhim | 2; 6 | 2; 6 |
| 2 | (Brunei) (Iraq) | Wong-Kee Loong; Saddam-Hussain Kadhim | 6; 4 | 2; 6 | 1; 6 |
| 3 | (Brunei) (Iraq) | Wong-Kee Loong / Chok-Kah Rui; Saddam-Hussain Kadhim / Hussain Rasheed | 2; 6 | 0; 6 |

=== Bahrain vs. Iraq ===
Bahrain
2
National Centre, Dhaka, Bangladesh
22 March 2002

Iraq
1

| | | | 1 | 2 | 3 |
|---|---|---|---|---|---|
| 1 | (Bahrain) (Iraq) | Abdul-Rahman Shehab; Haidar Kadhim | 7^{7} 6^{2} | 4; 6 | 6; 4 |
| 2 | (Bahrain) (Iraq) | Esam Abdulaal; Saddam-Hussain Kadhim | 3; 6 | 6; 2 | 6; 4 |
| 3 | (Bahrain) (Iraq) | Saeed Ismail / Abdul-Rahman Shehab; Kadhim Kadhim / Hussain Rasheed | 6^{6} 7^{8} | 3; 6 |

=== Brunei vs. Kyrgyzstan ===
Brunei
0
National Centre, Dhaka, Bangladesh
22 March 2002

Kyrgyzstan
3

| | | | 1 | 2 | 3 |
|---|---|---|---|---|---|
| 1 | (Brunei) (Kyrgyzstan) | Tzannie Abu Bakar; Ruslan Eshmuhamedov | 0; 6 | 0; 6 |
| 2 | (Brunei) (Kyrgyzstan) | Chok-Kah Rui; Eduard Koifman | 0; 6 | 2; 6 |
| 3 | (Brunei) (Kyrgyzstan) | Tzannie Abu Bakar / Mohammed Ridzuan-Yunos; Ernest Batirbekov / Ilia Sazonov | 0; 6 | 0; 6 |

== Pool B ==
| Team | Pld | W | L | MF | MA |
|---|---|---|---|---|---|
| Bangladesh | 3 | 2 | 1 | 7 | 2 |
| Oman | 3 | 2 | 1 | 5 | 4 |
| Sri Lanka | 3 | 2 | 1 | 5 | 4 |
| Jordan | 3 | 0 | 3 | 1 | 8 |

=== Sri Lanka vs. Jordan ===
Sri Lanka
2
National Centre, Dhaka, Bangladesh
20 March 2002

Jordan
1

| | | | 1 | 2 | 3 |
|---|---|---|---|---|---|---|
| 1 | (Sri Lanka) (Jordan) | Franklyn Emmanuel; Fabio Badra | 3; 6 | 5; 7 |
| 2 | (Sri Lanka) (Jordan) | Rajeev Rajapakse; Ahmed Ibrahim Ahmad Alhadid | 4; 6 | 6; 2 | 3; 0 | retired |
| 3 | (Sri Lanka) (Jordan) | Harshana Godamanna / Rajeev Rajapakse; Ahmed Ibrahim Ahmad Alhadid / Fabio Badra | 6; 2 | 6; 4 |

=== Bangladesh vs. Oman ===
Bangladesh
3
National Centre, Dhaka, Bangladesh
20 March 2002

Oman
0

| | | | 1 | 2 | 3 |
|---|---|---|---|---|---|
| 1 | (Bangladesh) (Oman) | Shibu Lal; Khalid Al Nabhani | 6; 3 | 6; 4 |
| 2 | (Bangladesh) (Oman) | Hira Lal; Mohammed Al Nabhani | 6^{7} 7^{9} | 6; 2 | 6; 0 |
| 3 | (Bangladesh) (Oman) | Shibu Lal / Dilip Passia; Khalid Al Nabhani / Mohammed Al Nabhani | 6; 4 | 4; 6 | 7; 5 |

=== Sri Lanka vs. Oman ===
Sri Lanka
1
National Centre, Dhaka, Bangladesh
21 March 2002

Oman
2

| | | | 1 | 2 | 3 |
|---|---|---|---|---|---|
| 1 | (Sri Lanka) (Oman) | Franklyn Emmanuel; Mudrik Al Rawahi | 7^{7} 6^{5} | 2; 6 | 4; 6 |
| 2 | (Sri Lanka) (Oman) | Rajeev Rajapakse; Khalid Al Nabhani | 7^{7} 6^{4} | 6; 2 |
| 3 | (Sri Lanka) (Oman) | Franklyn Emmanuel / Rajeev Rajapakse; Khalid Al Nabhani / Mohammed Al Nabhani | 1; 6 | 5; 7 |

=== Jordan vs. Bangladesh ===
Jordan
0
National Centre, Dhaka, Bangladesh
21 March 2002

Bangladesh
3

| | | | 1 | 2 | 3 |
|---|---|---|---|---|---|---|
| 1 | (Jordan) (Bangladesh) | Fabio Badra; Shibu Lal | 4; 6 | 1; 6 |
| 2 | (Jordan) (Bangladesh) | Ahmed Ibrahim Ahmad Alhadid; Hira Lal | 2; 6 | 0; 1 | | retired |
| 3 | (Jordan) (Bangladesh) | Fabio Badra / Tareq Talal Shkakwa; Shibu Lal / Dilip Passia | 3; 6 | 1; 6 |

=== Sri Lanka vs. Bangladesh ===
Sri Lanka
2
National Centre, Dhaka, Bangladesh
22 March 2002

Bangladesh
1

| | | | 1 | 2 | 3 |
|---|---|---|---|---|---|
| 1 | (Sri Lanka) (Bangladesh) | Harshana Godamanna; Shibu Lal | 2; 6 | 1; 6 |
| 2 | (Sri Lanka) (Bangladesh) | Rajeev Rajapakse; Dilip Passia | 6^{5} 7^{7} | 6; 2 | 6; 1 |
| 3 | (Sri Lanka) (Bangladesh) | Franklyn Emmanuel / Rajeev Rajapakse; Shibu Lal / Dilip Passia | 7^{8} 6^{6} | 6; 4 |

=== Jordan vs. Oman ===
Jordan
0
National Centre, Dhaka, Bangladesh
22 March 2002

Oman
3

| | | | 1 | 2 | 3 |
|---|---|---|---|---|---|
| 1 | (Jordan) (Oman) | Tareq Talal Shkakwa; Mudrik Al Rawahi | 1; 6 | 3; 6 |
| 2 | (Jordan) (Oman) | Fabio Badra; Khalid Al Nabhani | 6^{1} 7^{7} | 5; 7 |
| 3 | (Jordan) (Oman) | Fabio Badra / Tareq Talal Shkakwa; Khalid Al Nabhani / Mohammed Al Nabhani | 1; 6 | 2; 6 |

== Promotion pool ==
The top two teams from each of Pools A and B advanced to the Promotion pool. Results and points from games against the opponent from the preliminary round were carried forward.

| Team | Pld | W | L | MF | MA |
|---|---|---|---|---|---|
| Kyrgyzstan | 3 | 2 | 1 | 6 | 3 |
| Bahrain | 3 | 2 | 1 | 6 | 3 |
| Bangladesh | 3 | 1 | 2 | 4 | 5 |
| Oman | 3 | 1 | 2 | 2 | 7 |

=== Bahrain vs. Bangladesh ===
Bahrain
2
National Centre, Dhaka, Bangladesh
23 March 2002

Bangladesh
1

| | | | 1 | 2 | 3 |
|---|---|---|---|---|---|
| 1 | (Bahrain) (Bangladesh) | Abdul-Rahman Shehab; Shibu Lal | 3; 6 | 2; 6 |
| 2 | (Bahrain) (Bangladesh) | Esam Abdulaal; Hira Lal | 6; 4 | 6; 2 |
| 3 | (Bahrain) (Bangladesh) | Esam Abdulaal / Abdul-Rahman Shehab; Shibu Lal / Hira Lal | 6; 2 | 6; 3 |

=== Oman vs. Kyrgyzstan ===
Oman
2
National Centre, Dhaka, Bangladesh
23 March 2002

Kyrgyzstan
1

| | | | 1 | 2 | 3 |
|---|---|---|---|---|---|
| 1 | (Oman) (Kyrgyzstan) | Khalid Al Nabhani; Ruslan Eshmuhamedov | 2; 6 | 3; 6 |
| 2 | (Oman) (Kyrgyzstan) | Mohammed Al Nabhani; Eduard Koifman | 6; 2 | 4; 6 | 6; 4 |
| 3 | (Oman) (Kyrgyzstan) | Khalid Al Nabhani / Mohammed Al Nabhani; Ruslan Eshmuhamedov / Eduard Koifman | 6; 0 | 7^{9} 6^{7} |

=== Bahrain vs. Oman ===
Bahrain
3
National Centre, Dhaka, Bangladesh
24 March 2002

Oman
0

| | | | 1 | 2 | 3 |
|---|---|---|---|---|---|
| 1 | (Bahrain) (Oman) | Abdul-Rahman Shehab; Khalid Al Nabhani | 6; 2 | 6; 1 |
| 2 | (Bahrain) (Oman) | Esam Abdulaal; Mohammed Al Nabhani | 6; 4 | 6; 4 |
| 3 | (Bahrain) (Oman) | Omar-Mohammed Ahmed / Saeed Ismail; Mudrik Al Rawahi / Saleh Al Zadjali | 6; 0 | 6; 2 |

=== Bangladesh vs. Kyrgyzstan ===
Bangladesh
0
National Centre, Dhaka, Bangladesh
24 March 2002

Kyrgyzstan
3

| | | | 1 | 2 | 3 |
|---|---|---|---|---|---|
| 1 | (Bangladesh) (Kyrgyzstan) | Shibu Lal; Ruslan Eshmuhamedov | 2; 6 | 4; 6 |
| 2 | (Bangladesh) (Kyrgyzstan) | Dilip Passia; Eduard Koifman | 1; 6 | 1; 6 |
| 3 | (Bangladesh) (Kyrgyzstan) | Shibu Lal / Sree-Amol Roy; Ruslan Eshmuhamedov / Eduard Koifman | 4; 6 | 6; 1 | 1; 6 |

Kyrgyzstan and Bahrain promoted to Group III for 2003.

== Placement pool ==
The bottom two teams from Pools A and B were placed in the placement group. Results and points from games against the opponent from the preliminary round were carried forward.

| Team | Pld | W | L | MF | MA |
|---|---|---|---|---|---|
| Sri Lanka | 3 | 3 | 0 | 7 | 2 |
| Iraq | 3 | 2 | 1 | 6 | 3 |
| Jordan | 3 | 1 | 2 | 5 | 4 |
| Brunei | 3 | 0 | 3 | 0 | 9 |

=== Iraq vs. Jordan ===
Iraq
2
National Centre, Dhaka, Bangladesh
23 March 2002

Jordan
1

| | | | 1 | 2 | 3 |
|---|---|---|---|---|---|
| 1 | (Iraq) (Jordan) | Hussain Rasheed; Tareq Talal Shkakwa | 6; 1 | 6; 1 |
| 2 | (Iraq) (Jordan) | Haidar Kadhim; Fabio Badra | 4; 6 | 3; 6 |
| 3 | (Iraq) (Jordan) | Haidar Kadhim / Hussain Rasheed; Fabio Badra / Tareq Talal Shkakwa | 6; 2 | 6; 3 |

=== Sri Lanka vs. Brunei ===
Sri Lanka
3
National Centre, Dhaka, Bangladesh
23 March 2002

Brunei
0

| | | | 1 | 2 | 3 |
|---|---|---|---|---|---|
| 1 | (Sri Lanka) (Brunei) | Franklyn Emmanuel; Chok-Kah Rui | 6; 2 | 6; 3 |
| 2 | (Sri Lanka) (Brunei) | Rajeev Rajapakse; Wong-Kee Loong | 6; 1 | 6; 2 |
| 3 | (Sri Lanka) (Brunei) | Harshana Godamanna / Oshada Wijemanne; Wong-Kee Loong / Chok-Kah Rui | 6; 3 | 6; 0 |

=== Iraq vs. Sri Lanka ===
Iraq
1
National Centre, Dhaka, Bangladesh
24 March 2002

Sri Lanka
2

| | | | 1 | 2 | 3 |
|---|---|---|---|---|---|
| 1 | (Iraq) (Sri Lanka) | Hussain Rasheed; Franklyn Emmanuel | 7^{7} 6^{4} | 6; 2 |
| 2 | (Iraq) (Sri Lanka) | Haidar Kadhim; Rajeev Rajapakse | 3; 6 | 0; 6 |
| 3 | (Iraq) (Sri Lanka) | Haidar Kadhim / Hussain Rasheed; Franklyn Emmanuel / Rajeev Rajapakse | 0; 6 | 1; 6 |

=== Jordan vs. Brunei ===
Jordan
3
National Centre, Dhaka, Bangladesh
24 March 2002

Brunei
0

| | | | 1 | 2 | 3 |
|---|---|---|---|---|---|
| 1 | (Jordan) (Brunei) | Tareq Talal Shkakwa; Chok-Kah Rui | 7; 5 | 6; 4 |
| 2 | (Jordan) (Brunei) | Fabio Badra; Wong-Kee Loong | 6; 2 | 6; 4 |
| 3 | (Jordan) (Brunei) | Fabio Badra / Tareq Talal Shkakwa; Wong-Kee Loong / Chok-Kah Rui | 7^{10} 6^{8} | 6; 4 |

== Final standings ==
| Rank | Team |
|---|---|
| 1 | Kyrgyzstan |
| 2 | Bahrain |
| 3 | Bangladesh |
| 4 | Oman |
| 5 | Sri Lanka |
| 6 | Iraq |
| 7 | Jordan |
| 8 | Brunei |

- Kyrgyzstan and Bahrain promoted to Group III in 2003.
