= 2003 Davis Cup Asia/Oceania Zone Group III =

International tennis competition

The Group III tournament was held July 23–27, in Kuala Lumpur, Malaysia, on outdoor hard courts.

== Format ==
The eight teams were split into two groups and played in a round-robin format. The top two teams of each group advanced to the promotion pool, from which the two top teams were promoted to the Asia/Oceania Zone Group II in 2004. The bottom two teams of each group were placed in the relegation pool, from which the two bottom teams were demoted to the Asia/Oceania Zone Group IV in 2004.

== Pool A ==
| Team | Pld | W | L | MF | MA |
|---|---|---|---|---|---|
| Kuwait | 3 | 3 | 0 | 9 | 0 |
| Pacific Oceania | 3 | 2 | 1 | 5 | 4 |
| Kyrgyzstan | 3 | 1 | 2 | 3 | 6 |
| United Arab Emirates | 3 | 0 | 3 | 1 | 8 |

=== Kuwait vs. Pacific Oceania ===
Kuwait
3
National Tennis Centre, Kuala Lumpur, Malaysia
23 July 2003

Pacific Oceania
0

| | | | 1 | 2 | 3 |
|---|---|---|---|---|---|
| 1 | (Kuwait) (Pacific Oceania) | Mohammad-Khaliq Siddiq; Cyril Jacobe | 6; 1 | 6; 3 |
| 2 | (Kuwait) (Pacific Oceania) | Mohammad Ghareeb; Juan Sebastien Langton | 6; 2 | 6; 4 |
| 3 | (Kuwait) (Pacific Oceania) | Mohammad Ghareeb / Abdullah Maqdes; Brett Baudinet / Juan Sebastien Langton | 6; 3 | 7^{9} 6^{7} |

=== Kyrgyzstan vs. United Arab Emirates ===
Kyrgyzstan
2
National Tennis Centre, Kuala Lumpur, Malaysia
23 July 2003

United Arab Emirates
1

| | | | 1 | 2 | 3 |
|---|---|---|---|---|---|
| 1 | (Kyrgyzstan) (United Arab Emirates) | Ruslan Eshmuhamedov; Mahmoud Nader Al Blooshi | 6; 2 | 7^{7} 6^{2} |
| 2 | (Kyrgyzstan) (United Arab Emirates) | Ernest Batirbekov; Omar Alawadhi | 6; 3 | 6; 4 |
| 3 | (Kyrgyzstan) (United Arab Emirates) | Ernest Batirbekov / Ruslan Eshmuhamedov; Mohammed Abdel-Aziz Al Nuaimi / Omar Alawadhi | 4; 6 | 6; 3 | 2; 6 |

=== Kuwait vs. Kyrgyzstan ===
Kuwait
3
National Tennis Centre, Kuala Lumpur, Malaysia
24 July 2003

Kyrgyzstan
0

| | | | 1 | 2 | 3 |
|---|---|---|---|---|---|
| 1 | (Kuwait) (Kyrgyzstan) | Mohammad-Khaliq Siddiq; Ruslan Eshmuhamedov | 6; 3 | 6; 1 |
| 2 | (Kuwait) (Kyrgyzstan) | Mohammad Ghareeb; Ernest Batirbekov | 6; 0 | 6; 2 |
| 3 | (Kuwait) (Kyrgyzstan) | Musaad Al Jazzaf / Abdullah Maqdes; Boris Baichorov / Sergei Ni | 7^{7} 6^{1} | 6; 0 |

=== United Arab Emirates vs. Pacific Oceania ===
United Arab Emirates
0
National Tennis Centre, Kuala Lumpur, Malaysia
24 July 2003

Pacific Oceania
3

| | | | 1 | 2 | 3 |
|---|---|---|---|---|---|
| 1 | (United Arab Emirates) (Pacific Oceania) | Mahmoud Nader Al Blooshi; Cyril Jacobe | 4; 6 | 4; 6 |
| 2 | (United Arab Emirates) (Pacific Oceania) | Omar Alawadhi; Juan Sebastien Langton | 1; 6 | 2; 6 |
| 3 | (United Arab Emirates) (Pacific Oceania) | Mohammed Abdel-Aziz Al Nuaimi / Mahmoud Nader Al Blooshi; Brett Baudinet / Juan Sebastien Langton | 1; 6 | 1; 6 |

=== Kuwait vs. United Arab Emirates ===
Kuwait
3
National Tennis Centre, Kuala Lumpur, Malaysia
25 July 2003

United Arab Emirates
0

| | | | 1 | 2 | 3 |
|---|---|---|---|---|---|
| 1 | (Kuwait) (United Arab Emirates) | Abdullah Maqdes; Mohammed Abdel-Aziz Al Nuaimi | 6; 2 | 6; 1 |
| 2 | (Kuwait) (United Arab Emirates) | Musaad Al Jazzaf; Mahmoud Nader Al Blooshi | 7^{8} 6^{6} | 6; 2 |
| 3 | (Kuwait) (United Arab Emirates) | Musaad Al Jazzaf / Abdullah Maqdes; Mohammed Abdel-Aziz Al Nuaimi / Mahmoud Nader Al Blooshi | 6; 1 | 6; 1 |

=== Kyrgyzstan vs. Pacific Oceania ===
Kyrgyzstan
1
National Tennis Centre, Kuala Lumpur, Malaysia
25 July 2003

Pacific Oceania
2

| | | | 1 | 2 | 3 |
|---|---|---|---|---|---|
| 1 | (Kyrgyzstan) (Pacific Oceania) | Ruslan Eshmuhamedov; Cyril Jacobe | 6; 3 | 1; 6 | 6; 0 |
| 2 | (Kyrgyzstan) (Pacific Oceania) | Ernest Batirbekov; Juan Sebastien Langton | 2; 6 | 1; 6 |
| 3 | (Kyrgyzstan) (Pacific Oceania) | Ernest Batirbekov / Ruslan Eshmuhamedov; Brett Baudinet / Juan Sebastien Langton | 6^{6} 7^{8} | 4; 6 |

== Pool B ==
| Team | Pld | W | L | MF | MA |
|---|---|---|---|---|---|
| Malaysia | 3 | 3 | 0 | 7 | 2 |
| Qatar | 3 | 2 | 1 | 6 | 3 |
| Syria | 3 | 1 | 2 | 3 | 6 |
| Bahrain | 3 | 0 | 3 | 2 | 7 |

=== Malaysia vs. Syria ===
Malaysia
3
National Tennis Centre, Kuala Lumpur, Malaysia
23 July 2003

Syria
0

| | | | 1 | 2 | 3 |
|---|---|---|---|---|---|---|
| 1 | (Malaysia) (Syria) | Adam Jaya; Rabi Bouhassoun | 6; 4 | 3; 6 | 5; 0 | retired |
| 2 | (Malaysia) (Syria) | Si Yew Ming; Lays Salim | 6; 2 | 7^{7} 6^{5} |
| 3 | (Malaysia) (Syria) | Lai Kok Seong / Mohammed-Noor Noordin; Wael Chami / Abraham Ibrahim | 6; 1 | 6; 1 |

=== Qatar vs. Bahrain ===
Qatar
3
National Tennis Centre, Kuala Lumpur, Malaysia
23 July 2003

Bahrain
0

| | | | 1 | 2 | 3 |
|---|---|---|---|---|---|
| 1 | (Qatar) (Bahrain) | Amir Mohamed Ebrahim Bayoumi; Abdul-Rahman Shehab | 6; 4 | 6; 4 |
| 2 | (Qatar) (Bahrain) | Sultan Khalfan Al Alawi; Esam Abdulaal | 6; 1 | 6; 2 |
| 3 | (Qatar) (Bahrain) | Mohammed Abdulla / Amir Mohamed Ebrahim Bayoumi; Nader Abdul-Aal / Abdul-Rahman Shehab | 6; 3 | 5; 7 | 6; 3 |

=== Malaysia vs. Bahrain ===
Malaysia
2
National Tennis Centre, Kuala Lumpur, Malaysia
24 July 2003

Bahrain
1

| | | | 1 | 2 | 3 |
|---|---|---|---|---|---|
| 1 | (Malaysia) (Bahrain) | Adam Jaya; Abdul-Rahman Shehab | 4; 6 | 4; 6 |
| 2 | (Malaysia) (Bahrain) | Si Yew Ming; Bader Abdul-Aal | 6; 0 | 6; 3 |
| 3 | (Malaysia) (Bahrain) | Adam Jaya / Si Yew Ming; Bader Abdul-Aal / Abdul-Rahman Shehab | 6; 0 | 6; 3 |

=== Qatar vs. Syria ===
Qatar
2
National Tennis Centre, Kuala Lumpur, Malaysia
24 July 2003

Syria
1

| | | | 1 | 2 | 3 |
|---|---|---|---|---|---|
| 1 | (Qatar) (Syria) | Amir Mohamed Ebrahim Bayoumi; Abraham Ibrahim | 4; 6 | 1; 6 |
| 2 | (Qatar) (Syria) | Sultan Khalfan Al Alawi; Rabi Bouhassoun | 6; 1 | 6; 3 |
| 3 | (Qatar) (Syria) | Sultan Khalfan Al Alawi / Amir Mohamed Ebrahim Bayoumi; Abraham Ibrahim / Lays Salim | 6; 1 | 6; 3 |

=== Malaysia vs. Qatar ===
Malaysia
2
National Tennis Centre, Kuala Lumpur, Malaysia
25 July 2003

Qatar
1

| | | | 1 | 2 | 3 |
|---|---|---|---|---|---|---|
| 1 | (Malaysia) (Qatar) | Adam Jaya; Amir Mohamed Ebrahim Bayoumi | 6; 4 | 4; 5 | | retired |
| 2 | (Malaysia) (Qatar) | Si Yew Ming; Sultan Khalfan Al Alawi | 7; 5 | 6; 2 |
| 3 | (Malaysia) (Qatar) | Mohammed-Noor Noordin / Si Yew Ming; Sultan Khalfan Al Alawi / Amir Mohamed Ebrahim Bayoumi | 6; 1 | 6; 2 |

=== Bahrain vs. Syria ===
Bahrain
1
National Tennis Centre, Kuala Lumpur, Malaysia
25 July 2003

Syria
2

| | | | 1 | 2 | 3 |
|---|---|---|---|---|---|---|
| 1 | (Bahrain) (Syria) | Abdul-Rahman Shehab; Abraham Ibrahim | 6; 4 | 0; 2 | | retired |
| 2 | (Bahrain) (Syria) | Esam Abdulaal; Lays Salim | 6; 1 | 6; 2 |
| 3 | (Bahrain) (Syria) | Esam Abdulaal / Nader Abdul-Aal; Abraham Ibrahim / Lays Salim | 6; 1 | 2; 6 | 3; 6 |

== Promotion pool ==
The top two teams from each of Pools A and B advanced to the Promotion pool. Results and points from games against the opponent from the preliminary round were carried forward.

| Team | Pld | W | L | MF | MA |
|---|---|---|---|---|---|
| Kuwait | 3 | 3 | 0 | 9 | 0 |
| Malaysia | 3 | 2 | 1 | 5 | 4 |
| Pacific Oceania | 3 | 1 | 2 | 2 | 7 |
| Qatar | 3 | 0 | 3 | 2 | 7 |

=== Kuwait vs. Qatar ===
Kuwait
3
National Tennis Centre, Kuala Lumpur, Malaysia
26 July 2003

Qatar
0

| | | | 1 | 2 | 3 |
|---|---|---|---|---|---|
| 1 | (Kuwait) (Qatar) | Mohammad-Khaliq Siddiq; Mohammed Abdulla | 6; 1 | 6; 2 |
| 2 | (Kuwait) (Qatar) | Mohammad Ghareeb; Sultan Khalfan Al Alawi | 6; 0 | 6; 2 |
| 3 | (Kuwait) (Qatar) | Musaad Al Jazzaf / Abdullah Maqdes; Mohammed Abdulla / Amir Mohamed Ebrahim Bayoumi | 6; 3 | 6; 4 |

=== Malaysia vs. Pacific Oceania ===
Malaysia
3
National Tennis Centre, Kuala Lumpur, Malaysia
26 July 2003

Pacific Oceania
0

| | | | 1 | 2 | 3 |
|---|---|---|---|---|---|
| 1 | (Malaysia) (Pacific Oceania) | Lai Kok Seong; Cyril Jacobe | 6; 3 | 6; 4 |
| 2 | (Malaysia) (Pacific Oceania) | Si Yew Ming; Juan Sebastien Langton | 6; 0 | 6; 2 |
| 3 | (Malaysia) (Pacific Oceania) | Adam Jaya / Mohammed-Noor Noordin; Brett Baudinet / Juan Sebastien Langton | 3; 6 | 7; 5 | 6; 3 |

=== Kuwait vs. Malaysia ===
Kuwait
3
National Tennis Centre, Kuala Lumpur, Malaysia
27 July 2003

Malaysia
0

| | | | 1 | 2 | 3 |
|---|---|---|---|---|---|
| 1 | (Kuwait) (Malaysia) | Abdullah Maqdes; Mohammed-Noor Noordin | 6; 4 | 6; 1 |
| 2 | (Kuwait) (Malaysia) | Musaad Al Jazzaf; Lai Kok Seong | 6; 3 | 6; 2 |
| 3 | (Kuwait) (Malaysia) | Musaad Al Jazzaf / Abdullah Maqdes; Adam Jaya / Mohammed-Noor Noordin | 6; 3 | 6; 4 |

=== Qatar vs. Pacific Oceania ===
Qatar
1
National Tennis Centre, Kuala Lumpur, Malaysia
27 July 2003

Pacific Oceania
2

| | | | 1 | 2 | 3 |
|---|---|---|---|---|---|
| 1 | (Qatar) (Pacific Oceania) | Mohammed Abdulla; Cyril Jacobe | 7^{7} 6^{2} | 3; 6 | 0; 6 |
| 2 | (Qatar) (Pacific Oceania) | Sultan Khalfan Al Alawi; Juan Sebastien Langton | 6; 1 | 7; 5 |
| 3 | (Qatar) (Pacific Oceania) | Mohammed Abdulla / Sultan Khalfan Al Alawi; Brett Baudinet / Cyril Jacobe | 2; 6 | 2; 6 |

Kuwait and Malaysia promoted to Group II for 2004.

== Relegation pool ==
The bottom two teams from Pools A and B were placed in the relegation group. Results and points from games against the opponent from the preliminary round were carried forward.

| Team | Pld | W | L | MF | MA |
|---|---|---|---|---|---|
| Bahrain | 3 | 2 | 1 | 6 | 3 |
| Syria | 3 | 2 | 1 | 5 | 4 |
| United Arab Emirates | 3 | 1 | 2 | 4 | 5 |
| Kyrgyzstan | 3 | 1 | 2 | 3 | 6 |

=== Kyrgyzstan vs. Bahrain ===
Kyrgyzstan
0
National Tennis Centre, Kuala Lumpur, Malaysia
26 July 2003

Bahrain
3

| | | | 1 | 2 | 3 |
|---|---|---|---|---|---|
| 1 | (Kyrgyzstan) (Bahrain) | Boris Baichorov; Abdul-Rahman Shehab | 2; 6 | 6; 4 | 6; 8 |
| 2 | (Kyrgyzstan) (Bahrain) | Ernest Batirbekov; Esam Abdulaal | 6; 4 | 4; 6 | 1; 6 |
| 3 | (Kyrgyzstan) (Bahrain) | Boris Baichorov / Sergei Ni; Nader Abdul-Aal / Abdul-Rahman Shehab | 4; 6 | 4; 6 |

=== Syria vs. United Arab Emirates ===
Syria
1
National Tennis Centre, Kuala Lumpur, Malaysia
26 July 2003

United Arab Emirates
2

| | | | 1 | 2 | 3 |
|---|---|---|---|---|---|
| 1 | (Syria) (United Arab Emirates) | Abraham Ibrahim; Mahmoud Nader Al Blooshi | 3; 6 | 2; 6 |
| 2 | (Syria) (United Arab Emirates) | Lays Salim; Omar Alawadhi | 6; 0 | 6; 2 |
| 3 | (Syria) (United Arab Emirates) | Abraham Ibrahim / Lays Salim; Omar Alawadhi / Mahmoud Nader Al Blooshi | 5; 7 | 4; 6 |

=== Kyrgyzstan vs. Syria ===
Kyrgyzstan
1
National Tennis Centre, Kuala Lumpur, Malaysia
27 July 2003

Syria
2

| | | | 1 | 2 | 3 |
|---|---|---|---|---|---|
| 1 | (Kyrgyzstan) (Syria) | Ruslan Eshmuhamedov; Rabi Bouhassoun | 6^{4} 7^{7} | 1; 6 |
| 2 | (Kyrgyzstan) (Syria) | Ernest Batirbekov; Lays Salim | 1; 6 | 0; 6 |
| 3 | (Kyrgyzstan) (Syria) | Boris Baichorov / Sergei Ni; Wael Chami / Abraham Ibrahim | 6; 4 | 3; 6 | 6; 4 |

=== Bahrain vs. United Arab Emirates ===
Bahrain
2
National Tennis Centre, Kuala Lumpur, Malaysia
27 July 2003

United Arab Emirates
1

| | | | 1 | 2 | 3 |
|---|---|---|---|---|---|
| 1 | (Bahrain) (United Arab Emirates) | Abdul-Rahman Shehab; Mahmoud Nader Al Blooshi | 2; 6 | 6; 2 | 6; 4 |
| 2 | (Bahrain) (United Arab Emirates) | Esam Abdulaal; Omar Alawadhi | 1; 6 | 4; 6 |
| 3 | (Bahrain) (United Arab Emirates) | Esam Abdulaal / Abdul-Rahman Shehab; Omar Alawadhi / Mahmoud Nader Al Blooshi | 3; 6 | 7^{7} 6^{5} | 6; 1 |

United Arab Emirates and Kyrgyzstan demoted to Group IV for 2004.

== Final standings ==
| Rank | Team |
|---|---|
| 1 | Kuwait |
| 2 | Malaysia |
| 3 | Pacific Oceania |
| 4 | Qatar |
| 5 | Bahrain |
| 6 | Syria |
| 7 | United Arab Emirates |
| 8 | Kyrgyzstan |

- Kuwait and Malaysia promoted to Group II in 2004.
- United Arab Emirates and Kyrgyzstan relegated to Group IV in 2004.
